= Cold War 1994 =

2026 Hong Kong film by Longman Leung

- Theatrical release poster
- Traditional Chinese: 寒戰1994
- Jyutping: Hon^{4} Zin^{3} Jat^{1} Gau^{2} Gau^{2} Sei^{3}
- Directed by: Longman Leung
- Screenplay by: Longman Leung; Jolyon Cheung; Cheung Fei-fan; He Liangyu
- Produced by: Bill Kong; Ivy Ho; Longman Leung; Yedda Chen; Li Xianzeng
- Starring: Daniel Wu; Terrance Lau; Wu Kang-ren; Tse Kwan-ho; Chow Yun-fat; Aaron Kwok; Louis Koo; Tony Leung Ka-fai; Louise Wong; Fish Liew; Aidan Gillen; Hugh Bonneville
- Cinematography: Anthony Pun
- Edited by: David Richardson; Fan Zhaoshuo
- Music by: Iris Liu; Hanz Au; Jolyon Cheung
- Production company: Edko Films
- Distributed by: Edko Films
- Release dates: 26 April 2026 (Shenzhen Grand Theater); 1 May 2026 (Hong Kong)
- Running time: 117 minutes
- Country: Hong Kong
- Languages: Cantonese; English
- Box office: US$47 million

Cold War 1994 (Chinese: 寒戰1994) is a 2026 Hong Kong crime thriller film co-written and directed by Longman Leung. A prequel to Cold War (2012) and Cold War 2 (2016), the film stars an ensemble cast with Chow Yun-fat, Aaron Kwok, and Tony Leung Ka-fai reprising their roles, and new additions Daniel Wu, Terrance Lau, Wu Kang-ren, Tse Kwan-ho, Louis Koo, Louise Wong, Fish Liew, Aidan Gillen, and Hugh Bonneville. The story is split between 2017 and 1994, the latter revolving around a power struggle among local elites, triads, and the British government prior to the Handover of Hong Kong.

A third installment in the Cold War franchise entered development before the release of Cold War 2 in 2015, with production originally slated to begin in 2019. The project was postponed for various reasons, and producer Bill Kong decided to change the setting from the modern day to before the Handover after producing Anita (2021). Envisioned as a two-part prequel, Cold War 1994 and Cold War 1995, pre-production began in March 2024, with principal photography starting in June as a back-to-back production that spanned seven months in Hong Kong and London.

The film had its world premiere at the Shenzhen Grand Theater on 26 April 2026, and was theatrically released in Hong Kong on 1 May. It will be followed by the direct sequel Cold War 1995, which is slated to be released in 2027.

== Plot ==
In 2017, Yip is elected the new Chief Executive. Hoping to appoint Lee as Secretary for Security, who has become controversial due to Operation Cold War, (Note: As depicted in Cold War (2012)) he commissions senior counsel Kan to conduct a background investigation into Lee, during which Lee is attacked and goes missing. Commissioner of Police Lau thus approaches Kan for access to a classified file concerning a 1994 operation involving Lee.

In 1994, Lee, then head of the OCTB, leads a raid on a hideout of the triad Lo Yuen after receiving intelligence about a drug deal. Unbeknownst to them, the hideout's owner Tiger has also accepted a job to kidnap Wong, the brother-in-law of Sir William Poon, patriarch of one of Hong Kong's most influential families. Lee's team suffers casualties in a shootout while Tiger escapes with Wong. Hui, the then-Commissioner of Police, comes under pressure from William to rescue Wong and intends to scapegoat Lee for the failed operation. Before Special Branch officers can arrest Lee on Hui's orders, Deputy Commissioner Choi secretly warns Lee and helps him escape.

After lying low for some time, Lee seeks help from Lo Yuen's leader Jodie. During their negotiations, assassins attack and they narrowly escape. Lee convinces Jodie that the assassins were sent by Tiger's employer and that Tiger will be silenced once the ransom is paid. To protect Tiger, Jodie reveals Tiger's location, a boat hideout, to Lee, on the condition that Lee will keep him alive. Lee then informs Choi, who orders Lee to intercept the ransom delivery while he leads a hit team to rescue Wong. However, Lee fails and is arrested.

At police headquarters, Choi takes Lee from Hui's men after Lee's subordinates and peers threaten the Commissioner with mass resignation. Choi offers to send Lee away to prevent Special Branch from pursuing him, and apologizes, explaining that when his team boarded the boat, they found only Tiger's corpse, with no sign of Wong in the engine room. Realizing that Choi has betrayed him as he never mentioned where Wong was being held, Lee tries to escape Choi's escorts on the journey out, only to be captured by Jodie's underlings instead and taken to Tiger's mother Fong. Although Lee insists he was framed, Fong demands revenge for her son's death. Before Fong can execute Lee, Jodie shoots Lee in the arm and drops him into the sea. She secretly alerts Lee's father, an ex-cop with ties to Lo Yuen, to rescue him.

Choi, who took Wong hostage, meets William to demand ransom money. William agrees and promises to promote Choi to Commissioner, however, he orders Choi to disappear Wong instead, having discovered that Wong maintains ties with Britain and could invite British interference in the family business. William then confronts his son Simon, who confesses that he orchestrated Wong's kidnapping because he is secretly in love with Rosa, Wong's wife and William's adopted sister. Furious, William declares Simon will never inherit the family business. Lee contacts three undercover officers he planted inside Lo Yuen, the only men he still trusts, for help. They track Choi's men transporting Wong through Kai Tak Airport, but the pursuit ends in a crash that kills Wong. With Wong's corpse in his possession, Lee confronts Choi to negotiate, and the two agree to hand it over to the British as a gesture of loyalty. Britain sends F.M., a senior MI6 officer, to take charge of the incident. Choi agrees to continue protecting British interests after the Handover, while Lee refuses. Choi is thus promoted to Commissioner, whereas Lee is merely reinstated to his former rank. Meanwhile, William is killed in a car bombing orchestrated by Simon after meeting British officials at Downing Street.

In the mid-credits scene set in 2017, Yip interrupts Kan and Lau to reveal that Choi was assassinated earlier that day in London, and they suspect the records in Lee's classified file were deliberately altered.

== Cast ==
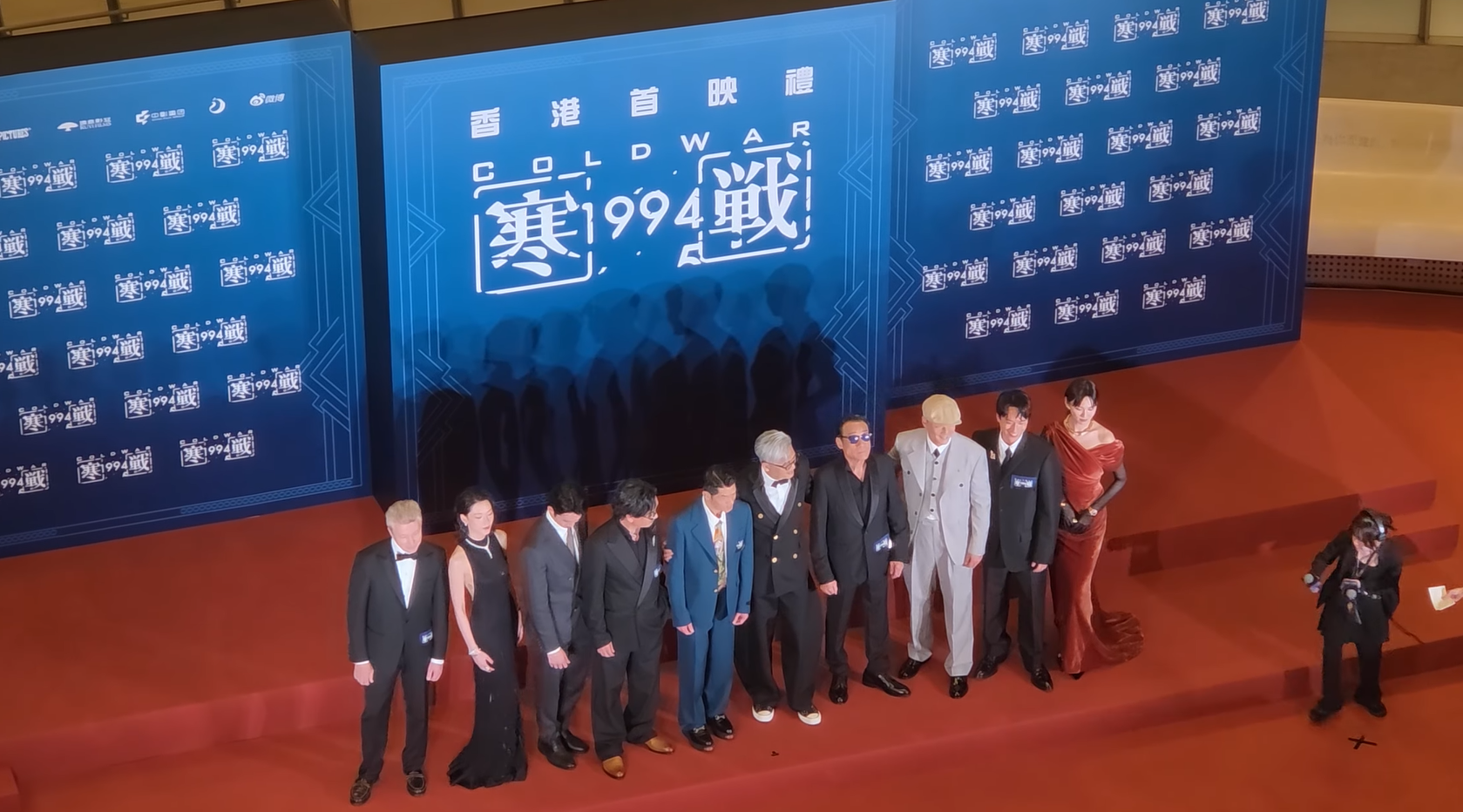
The main cast of Cold War 1994 at the Hong Kong premiere.

- Daniel Wu as Peter Choi, the Deputy Commissioner of Police Operations. The character was played by Chang Kuo-chu in Cold War 2 (2016). The film marks Wu's return to Hong Kong cinema after pursuing a career in Hollywood since the COVID-19 pandemic. Wu said that filming in Cantonese was the most challenging part of the production, and he spent two to three months preparing.
- Terrance Lau as M.B. Lee, the acting Chief Superintendent of the Organized Crime and Triad Bureau. Lau was considered for the role by director Longman Leung while filming Leung's previous feature Anita (2021). He underwent two months of combat and firearms training and worked out to prepare for the role, gaining around 5 kg in the process. He also performed his own stunts in several action sequences, noting that the complexity of his actions in this film is less than in his previous feature Twilight of the Warriors: Walled In (2024).
  - Tony Leung Ka-fai as the older M.B. Lee, the newly appointed Secretary for Security. Leung reprises his role from Cold War (2012) and Cold War 2. Terrance Lau said he was not looking to fully replicate Leung's older version of the character, but rather to give his own interpretation of the role.
- Wu Kang-ren as Simon Poon, the "ambitious" son of William Poon who is "ruthlessly sidelined". Longman Leung flew to Taiwan and invited Wu to join the cast right after Wu won Best Leading Actor at the 2023 Golden Horse Awards, marking Wu's first performance entirely in Cantonese. To immerse himself in the character, Wu also spoke in Cantonese with the crew on set even when not filming.
- Tse Kwan-ho as Sir William Poon, the "formidable" Poon family patriarch. Tse based his character on Hong Kong's old money aristocrats, such as Robert Hotung. To portray Poon, who is set to be 20 years older than Tse's actual age, he had to undergo three hours of prosthetic makeup before each shoot to age him visually. He also worked with a language coach to refine the pronunciation of his English lines in preparation for scenes with Hugh Bonneville.
- Chow Yun-fat as Oswald Kan, a senior counsel. Chow reprises his role from Cold War 2. The antique box camera used by Kan in the film came from Chow's personal collection.
- Aaron Kwok as Sean Lau, the Commissioner of Police. Kwok reprises his role from Cold War and Cold War 2.
- Louis Koo as Adrian Yip, the Chief Executive-elect. HK01 described the character's design as modeled after former Chief Executive Donald Tsang and Chief Executive candidate John Tsang.
- Louise Wong as Jodie Yuen, leader of the Lo Yuen triad. Wong was cast during the filming of Longman Leung's previous feature Anita (2021), and she underwent two months of combat and firearms training for the role. Wong and Leung collaborated to create the Chinese name of her character, Yeuk-lan (Chinese: 若蘭; Jyutping: Joek^{6} Laan^{4}), a pun of "like an orchid" and "if there is trouble" (Joek^{6} Jau^{5} Kwan^{3} Naan^{4}).
- Fish Liew as Rosa Poon, the adopted and youngest of ten siblings in the Poon family. Liew took inspiration from the character Victoria Chung, played by her in A Guilty Conscience (2023), while portraying the role.
- Aidan Gillen as F.M., MI6 Head of Asia-Pacific. The film marks Gillen's Asian cinema debut, with Gillen describing his decision to join the production as "no brainer" after watching the previous Cold War films and finding them "hugely impressive". He described his character as "a government man, an intelligence operative [who] doesn't always play by the rules".
- Hugh Bonneville as Chris Hughes, the British Cabinet Minister. Bonneville described his character as "a Whitehall wonk".

Also appearing in the film are Karen Mok as Irene Poon, a member of the Poon family and the dean of the School of Liberal Arts at the University of Hong Kong; Carlos Chan as K.F. Wong, Rosa's husband and William's brother-in-law, whose character arc is based on businessman Teddy Wang, who was kidnapped for ransom in 1990 and later went missing; Chen Yi-wen as Tim Ma, a real estate tycoon and patriarch of one of the Big Four families, whose character is modeled after Hong Kong billionaire Li Ka-shing; Locker Lam as Roger Ma, Tim Ma's eldest son; Kent Cheng, Dominic Cheung, and Vincent Kok as the three other patriarchs of the Big Four families; Cecilia Yip as Aunt Fong, a respected figure in the triads and the mother of Tiger Fong; Samuel Pang as Tiger Fong, the former second-in-command of Lo Yuen who kidnapped K.F. Wong; Michael Ning as Stephen Pak, Jodie's loyal strategist; Jeffrey Ngai as Tony, Pak's right-hand man; while Dominic Lam, Tai Bo, and Marx Cheung as S.K. Lai, C.K. Chan, and K.N. Chiu, the elders of Lo Yuen.

Michael Chow as Dickson Hui, the Commissioner of Police, modeled after the last Royal Hong Kong Police commissioner Eddie Hui; Peter Chan as Albert Kwong, the head of internal investigations, previously portrayed by Gordon Lam in Cold War; Kevin Chu as Roy Ho, a probationary inspector in Lee's team, previously portrayed by Tony Yang in Cold War 2; Mandy Tam and Mak Pui-tung as Bianca Yeung and Johnny Boy, Lee's subordinates; Dee Ho, Lokman Yeung, and Stanley Yau as Wu Tin-man, Eric Ma, and Neo Chan, undercover officers working for Lee who are planted within Lo Yuen; Angus Yeung as Dave Wong, Peter Choi's right-hand man; Tom Price as Walter Brown, a Special Branch officer; while Max Cheung and Stefan Wong as W.K. Tang and Y.W. Ma, the Senior Assistant Commissioners of Police.

In addition, Yuen Biao makes a cameo appearance as S.T. Lee, the first ethnic Chinese police superintendent and father of M.B. Lee, previously portrayed by Kenneth Tsang in Cold War 2; while Sammo Hung appears in a photograph as Jodie's father. Yuen and Hung, veteran actors in Hong Kong action cinema, were cast as Longman Leung wanted the film to "capture the distinctive flavor and sentiment of 1990s Hong Kong films". Other characters include Adam Pak as Adrian Cheuk, an air traffic controller, Samantha Ko as news anchor May Ip; and Mathias Woo as newspaper editor Chief Cho.

== Production ==
=== Development ===
"While sequels move the story forward, this prequel goes deeper, we are returning to the very source of the Cold War universe, revealing how the power reshuffle in 1994 planted the seeds for everything that followed."

— Bill Kong on making the Cold War franchise.

In late 2015, prior to the release of Cold War 2 (2016), Edko Films CEO Bill Kong initially planned to begin production on Cold War 3. In April 2016, Apple Daily reported that Kong expressed interest to continue producing the sequel with Longman Leung and Sunny Luk, the director duo of Cold War (2012) and Cold War 2, but the duo were planning to part ways due to creative differences stemming from their work on Helios (2015) and Cold War 2, with plans to resign from all joint directing contracts and pursue individual projects. Cold War 2 ultimately grossed over HK$62 million, becoming the highest-grossing Hong Kong film at that time, and the series amassed a total gross of over HK$100 million. After its subsequent release on television and streaming platforms, both of which received positive audience reception, Kong decided to turn Cold War into a franchise.

In December 2016, lead actors Aaron Kwok and Tony Leung Ka-fai hinted at a potential sequel during the awards ceremony of iQIYI Scream Night. Filming for Cold War 3 was initially scheduled to commence in late 2019, with Kwok, Leung, Chow Yun-fat, and Andy Lau returning to star. However, due to the police misconduct allegations during the 2019–2020 Hong Kong protests, production was deemed inappropriate at that time and led to a delay. In October 2019, Cold War 3 reportedly failed to obtain approval from mainland Chinese censors. Production was further suspended in 2020 due to the COVID-19 pandemic. Kong explained that he could not find a suitable premise for the sequel, so he chose to produce Anita (2021) first instead. The franchise was revived after the creators reached a breakthrough when Kong discussed a potential sequel with Leung, and Leung explained that they had already foreshadowed a prequel in the first film with a scene in which the ICAC interrogated M.B. Lee (played by Tony Leung Ka-fai) about an operation in 1995, so they agreed to shift the time setting from 2012 to pre-Handover. The South China Morning Post noted that the film's "rewinding to the pre-handover era and pinpointing Britain as the ultimate source of trouble" reflects the "broader, industry-wide survival tactic", following the 2019 Hong Kong protests, the implementation of 2020 Hong Kong national security law, and the 2021 amendments to the Film Censorship Ordinance, where "any negative portrayal of Hong Kong police becom[es] a potential political issue".

The conception for the Cold War prequels began during the filming of Anita, when Kong asked Leung to assemble "the most star-studded cast" he could and Kong would "try to accommodate". In May 2022, Edko Films announced that a Cold War television series was in production. Leung said that they initially intended to develop Cold War 1994 as a series before ultimately returning to the film medium, which he was more familiar with. The screenwriting process spanned approximately one and a half years, with Leung and three other screenwriters conducting separate research, each focusing on a storyline revolving around the police, old money, triads, and British intelligence. Leung placed particular emphasis on portraying Hong Kong's old money in the film, drawing inspiration from four to five real-life families to create the Poon family and basing many plot elements on real-life events. By March 2024, eight years after Cold War 2, two further Cold War films received approval from the China Film Administration. On 19 April, Daniel Wu, Wu Kang-ren, and Terrance Lau were announced as the main cast, with the films confirmed to be prequels set in 1994 and 1995 respectively.

=== Filming ===
Cold War 1994 and Cold War 1995 were shot back-to-back, with Anthony Pun serving as the cinematographer and principal photography beginning in June 2024. Filming started at the The Peninsula Hong Kong on 4 June, with Daniel Wu on set. On 12 June, Fish Liew was revealed to be part of the cast after posting set photos on social media. Taiwan-based Pat Ha returned to Hong Kong to join the shoot in mid-June, while Jeffrey Ngai stated that he had joined the shoot after filming The First Frost (2025) in July. Wu took a brief hiatus from filming to return to the United States for a racecar competition, then came to Hong Kong again in August to continue shooting. The East Kowloon Corridor and Kai Tak Tunnel were closed for filming on 17 and 24 August, two Saturdays. The production spanned seven months and over 100 shooting days, with additional location shoots in London, England.

The production design was led by art director Pater Wong and costume designer Karen Yip. To recreate 1990s Hong Kong, sets such as the police headquarters, triad altar, and the Poon family mansion were constructed specifically for the shoot. The Poon family mansion was entirely constructed in a film studio, spanning several thousand square feet and featuring a spacious living room, study, and spiral staircase. The mansion featured a series of vintage lighting fixtures that had been stored by a trading company for 20 to 30 years and were purchased by the production team for use on set. The triad altar, which was also constructed on set, was based on a traditional ancestral shrine. Wong described the police headquarters as inspired by a mix of the police office styles seen in Crime Story (1993) and Infernal Affairs (2001). Most of the set details, including police station furniture, office equipment, and structural elements, were crafted by the production designers.

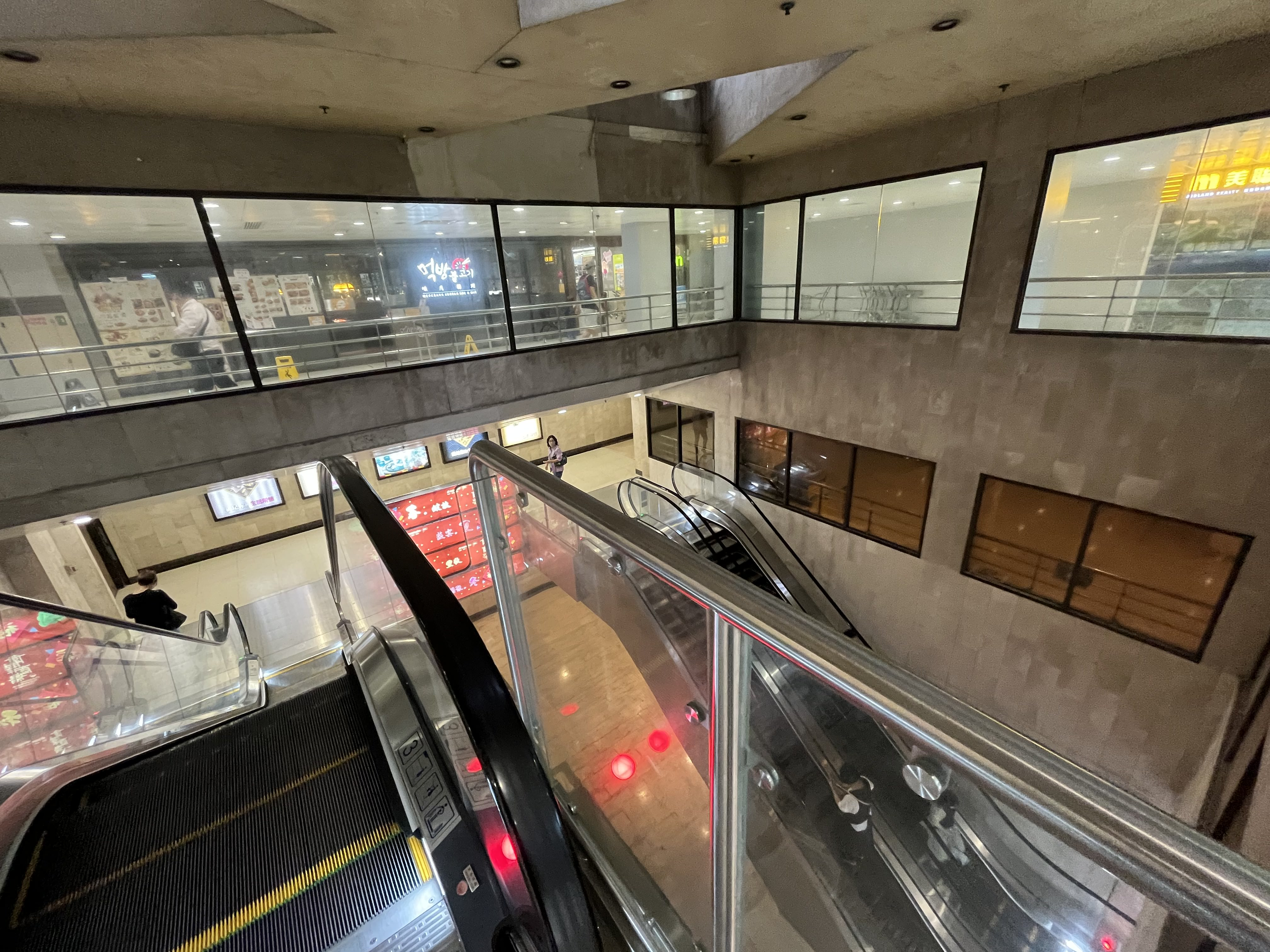
The Kai Tak Airport terminal scenes in the film were shot at Wai Wah Centre.

A replica of Kai Tak Airport was constructed to shoot a ten-day action sequence featuring Terrance Lau and Angus Yeung, with a real airplane used for filming, during which Lau nearly got hit by the plane. Scenes set in the Kai Tak Airport terminal were filmed at Wai Wah Centre in Sha Tin on a night in 2024, where the production team converted a lobby into the set. Most of the scenes set at Government House in the film were shot at 1881 Heritage, while the investiture ceremony and banquet scenes were filmed at Hong Kong Disneyland Hotel, due to its British architectural style and large outdoor lawn, which created the scenes' intended sense of grandeur and upper-class atmosphere. A car chase sequence featuring Lau and Louise Wong was filmed on a highway in To Kwa Wan, near a residential area, taking three weeks to complete, with each week dedicated to filming a different part of the scene to accommodate road closure measures.

=== Post-production ===
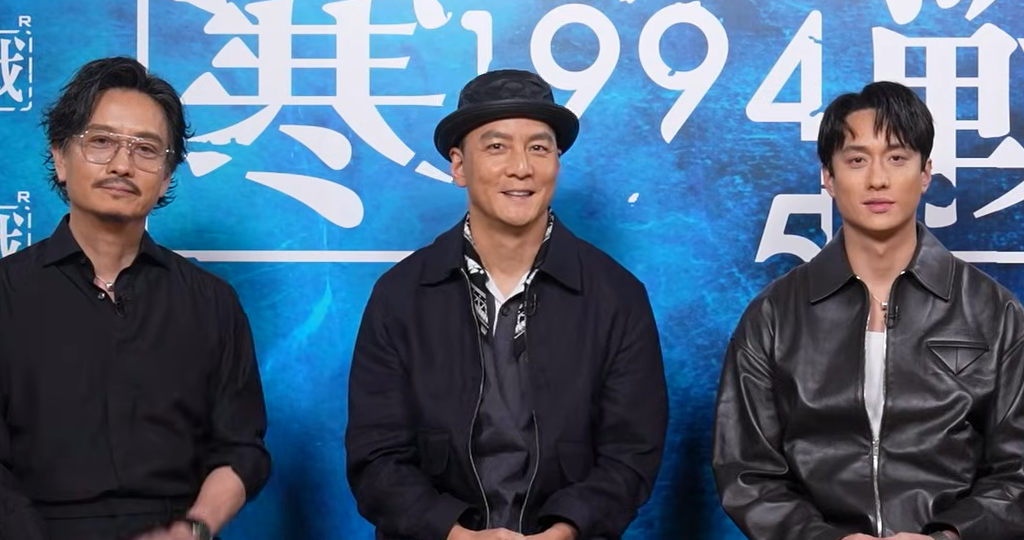
Tse Kwan-ho (left), Daniel Wu, and Terrance Lau interviewed by SET News in April 2026.

The film was edited by David Richardson, with both the editing and post-production each spanning a year. Many of the interaction scenes between Wu Kang-ren and Fish Liew's characters were cut during post-production, with Leung saying that they felt it was sufficient for the audience to sense his admiration and attachment toward her. On 14 May 2025, the film was presented at the Marché du Film during the 78th Cannes Film Festival, with Carlos Chan announced as part of the main cast. The film was reported to be released in the fourth quarter of 2025 at Cannes. In June, a 15-second teaser was released at the 2025 Shanghai International Film Festival. In February 2026, the film was presented at the European Film Market. On 18 March, a press conference held during the Hong Kong Filmart confirmed the return of Aaron Kwok, Tony Leung Ka-fai, and Chow Yun-fat, while also announcing new cast members Louis Koo, Tse Kwan-ho, Louise Wong, as well as Irish actor Aidan Gillen and English actor Hugh Bonneville. Leung said that Gillen and Bonneville provided advice on their lines to the crew and incorporated modern slang to "make the characters more three-dimensional and flesh-and-blood". An official trailer was released on 31 March, with Yuen Biao revealed to make a cameo appearance. A launching ceremony was held on 2 April at Pacific Place, announcing the cinematic re-release of Cold War and Cold War 2 on 16 and 23 April respectively.

== Release ==
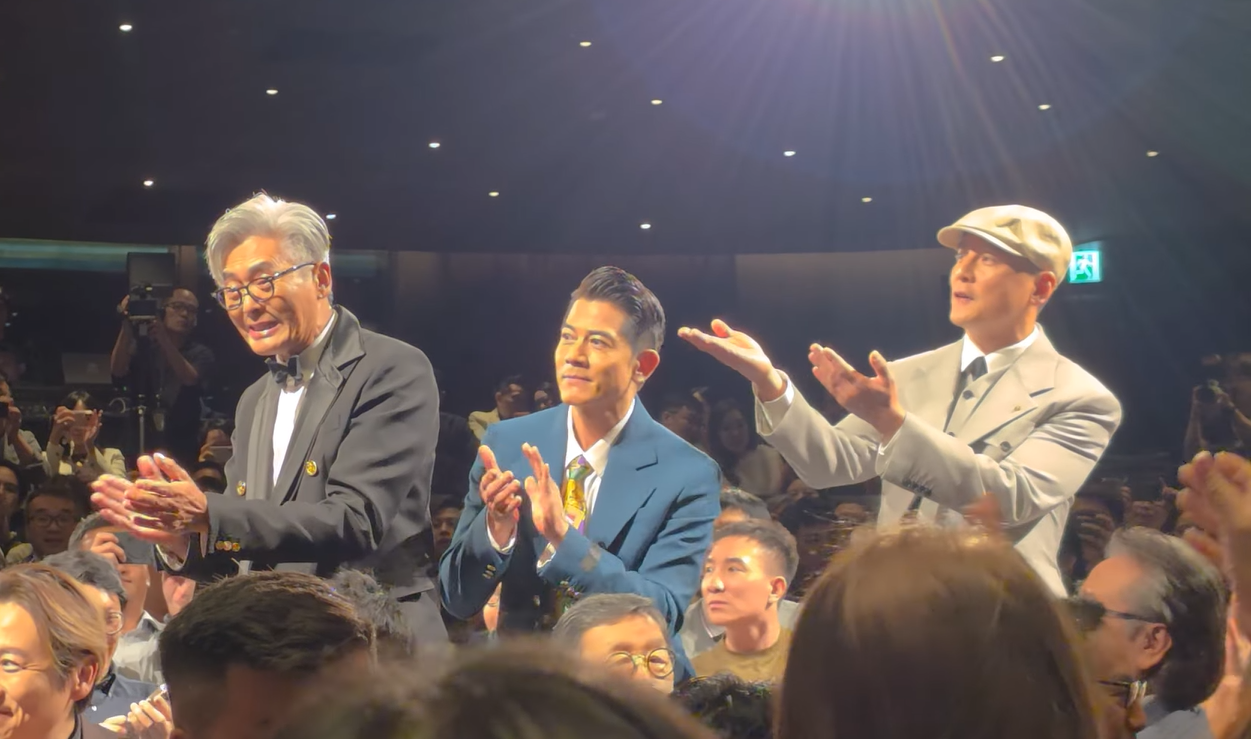
Chow Yun-fat (left), Aaron Kwok, and Daniel Wu at the Hong Kong premiere.

Cold War 1994 had its world premiere at the Shenzhen Grand Theater in Shenzhen, China on 26 April 2026, with Charlie Yeung and Waise Lee, who starred in previous Cold War films, as special guests, and received its Hong Kong premiere at Xiqu Centre, West Kowloon Cultural District on 27 April 2026, with Carol Cheng as the host and over 40 cast members in attendance. It was theatrically released in Hong Kong on 1 May 2026, including with IMAX, 4DX, and CGS formats. In celebration of the film's release on 1 May, the cast of Cold War 1994, including Daniel Wu, Terrance Lau, Tse Kwan-ho, Aaron Kwok, Louise Wong, Fish Liew, Chen Yi-wen, and Samantha Ko, released their childhood photos from the year 1994 to promote the film. A Cold War Wine & Music Fest was held at the Avenue of Stars, Tsim Sha Tsui from 1 to 3 May, coinciding with the film's release. The film was also released nationwide in mainland China and Malaysia on 1 May, and in Taiwan and the United Kingdom on 8 May.

== Reception ==
=== Box office ===
Cold War 1994 grossed over HK$6 million on its opening day, with Ming Pao describing the figures as "remarkable" and making it the highest opening-day gross in the Cold War franchise, and raked in approximately HK$15 million during its opening weekend. The film grossed HK$20 million in its first week of release, which film critic Ryan Ra noted that its box office trajectory differed from that of most commercial successes, performing below the recently released Night King (2026).

=== Critical response ===
Elizabeth Kerr of Screen International commended Cold War 1994 as the "spiritual successor to Andrew Lau's Infernal Affairs trilogy, albeit with far more allegory than Lau was compelled to include", finding that the "sophisticated screenplay plays with concepts of shifting colonialism, fractured policing infrastructure and [the United Kingdom's] seeming inability to eliminate outside interests from meddling in public policy", and deeming the film as elevating the Cold War franchise into "one of the best from post-handover Hong Kong". Keith Ho, writing for HK01, praised the film for having "almost collected all the strengths of Hong Kong cinema's golden age", including "the actors of the time, an gripping plot, lines that moved audiences, tense action sequences, and thrilling car-chase scenes", while noting that some details, such as the image of young M.B. Lee, seem "a bit apart from Cold War and Cold War II, he suggests that these differences may be explained in the sequel, calling the film "a highly successful trailer" that "makes you want to watch Cold War 1995 right away".

Edmund Lee of the South China Morning Post gave the film 3.5/5 stars and found that it "delivers exactly what it promised", noting that the film's decision to set in the "good old days of 1994", when "policemen and gangsters could still become best buddies, Britain was the natural "big bad", and screenwriters did not feel obliged to dedicate their mega-budget action spectacles to praising Hong Kong for upholding the common law system" means it "does not feel encumbered by declarations of political correctness", and the "marvellous action set pieces might even remind fans why they fell in love with the city's famed genre tradition in the first place". Whang Yee Ling of The Straits Times gave the film 3/5 stars, writing that it "builds on its success with enough energy and ambition for a fourth instalment" and praising its "multiple engrossing sub-dramas shored up by a stacked ensemble".

Estella Huang of Mirror Media rated the film 88/100, praising its "many carefully crafted connections" to the previous films in the franchise, its "meticulous tension comparable to its predecessors", and its "stronger historical and thematic resonance", but remarking that the film's attempt to "emphasize [M.B. Lee's] moral clarity and how it shaped his later transformation" removed part of the dramatic focus, leaving it feeling "slightly hollow and somewhat incomplete". Tay Yek Keak of 8days gave the film 3/5 stars and noted that while it features "more youth, vitality, attitude and action", it has "less kick, less star presence, certainly less believability", describing it as a "post-colonial damn-those-rich-bastards hangover with his convoluted shadowy spin set on the cusp of a historic handover" where "[Longman] Leung overwrites this latest chapter with duplicity coming from all directions", and questioning "Where the hell is China in all this hullabaloo?"

== Future ==
A direct sequel, Cold War 1995, is reported to be released in 2027. In April 2026, Longman Leung said that the film was in post-production, with hopes of being able to release it within the year. He also mentioned that a screenplay about a young Sean Lau (played by Aaron Kwok) had been completed, and Kwok expressed interest in reprising his role. A trailer for Cold War 1995 was featured after the end credits of Cold War 1994.
