= List of highest-grossing films in Hong Kong =

The following is a list of the highest-grossing films in Hong Kong. It only accounts for the films' theatrical box-office earning and not their ancillary revenues (i.e. home video rental and sales and television broadcast).

== Highest-grossing films ==
Background colour indicates films currently in cinemas

Rank	Title	Gross	Year	Country	Distributor	Director
1	Avengers: Endgame	HK$226,439,174	2019	US	Walt Disney Studios Motion Pictures	Anthony Russo; Joe Russo
2	Avatar	HK$186,622,348	2009	US	20th Century Fox	James Cameron
3	The Last Dance	HK$157,577,964	2024	Hong Kong	Emperor Motion Pictures	Anselm Chan
4	Avengers: Infinity War	HK$153,301,337	2018	US	Walt Disney Studios Motion Pictures	Anthony Russo; Joe Russo
5	Avatar: The Way of Water	HK$139,680,019	2022	US	20th Century Studios	James Cameron
6	Avengers: Age of Ultron	HK$132,746,652	2015	US	Walt Disney Studios Motion Pictures	Joss Whedon
7	Titanic	HK$128,003,033	1997	US	20th Century Fox	James Cameron
8	Spider-Man: No Way Home	HK$120,358,352	2021	US	Sony Pictures Releasing	Jon Watts
9	A Guilty Conscience	HK$115,060,394	2023	Hong Kong	Edko Films	Jack Ng
10	Night King	HK$113,000,000	2026	Hong Kong	Edko Films	Jack Ng
11	Captain America: Civil War	HK$112,654,686	2016	US	Walt Disney Studios Motion Pictures	Anthony Russo; Joe Russo
12	Twilight of the Warriors: Walled In	HK$108,448,257	2024	Hong Kong	Media Asia Films	Soi Cheang
13	Top Gun: Maverick	HK$107,702,455	2022	US	Paramount Pictures	Joseph Kosinski
14	Iron Man 3	HK$106,389,801	2013	US	Walt Disney Studios Motion Pictures	Shane Black
15	Spider-Man: Brand New Day	HK$101,214,007	2026	US	Sony Pictures Releasing	Destin Daniel Cretton
16	Transformers: Age of Extinction	HK$98,196,851	2014	US	Paramount Pictures	Michael Bay
17	Demon Slayer: Kimetsu no Yaiba – The Movie: Infinity Castle	HK$97,600,936	2025	Japan	Sony Pictures	Haruo Sotozaki
18	The Avengers	HK$96,705,670	2012	US	Walt Disney Studios Motion Pictures	Joss Whedon
19	Jurassic World	HK$96,295,976	2015	US	Universal Studios	Colin Trevorrow
20	Back to the Past	HK$91,157,394	2025	Hong Kong	One Cool Film	Ng Yuen-fai; Jack Lai
21	Toy Story 3	HK$89,364,118	2010	US	Walt Disney Studios Motion Pictures	Lee Unkrich
22	Jurassic World: Fallen Kingdom	HK$88,649,003	2018	US	Universal Pictures	J. A. Bayona
23	Toy Story 4	HK$88,537,419	2019	US	Walt Disney Studios Motion Pictures	Josh Cooley
24	Spider-Man: Far From Home	HK$84,788,927	2019	US	Sony Pictures Releasing	Jon Watts
25	Transformers: Dark of the Moon	HK$84,703,797	2011	US	Paramount Pictures	Michael Bay
26	Inside out 2	HK$84,526,606	2024	US	Walt Disney Studios Motion Pictures	Kelsey Mann
27	Warriors of Future	HK$81,947,016	2022	Hong Kong	One Cool Film	Ng Yuen-fai
28	Star Wars: The Force Awakens	HK$81,720,468	2015	US	Walt Disney Studios Motion Pictures	J. J. Abrams
29	The Dark Knight Rises	HK$80,269,966	2012	US	Warner Bros. Pictures	Christopher Nolan
30	Minions	HK$78,404,191	2015	US	Universal Studios	Pierre Coffin; Kyle Balda
31	Table for Six	HK$77,667,311	2022	Hong Kong	Edko Films	Sunny Chan
32	Harry Potter and the Deathly Hallows – Part 2	HK$77,420,916	2011	US	Warner Bros. Pictures	David Yates
33	Monsters University	HK$77,407,664	2013	US	Walt Disney Studios Motion Pictures	Dan Scanlon
34	Captain Marvel	HK$76,043,088	2019	US	Walt Disney Studios Motion Pictures	Anna Boden and Ryan Fleck
35	Aquaman	HK$75,240,104	2018	US	Warner Bros. Pictures	James Wan
36	The Odyssey	HK$74,151,086	2026	US	Universal Pictures	Christopher Nolan
37	Oppenheimer	HK$72,971,282	2023	US	Universal Studios	Christopher Nolan
38	Incredibles 2	HK$71,205,663	2018	US	Walt Disney Studios Motion Pictures	Brad Bird
39	Zootopia 2	HK$69,531,373	2025	US	Walt Disney Studios Motion Pictures	Jared Bush; Byron Howard
40	F1 movie	HK$68,956,949	2025	US	Universal Studios	Joseph Kosinski
41	Train To Busan	HK$68,004,629	2016	South Korea	Edko Films Ltd.	Yeon Sang-ho
42	The Beauty and The Beast	HK$67,232,357	2017	US	Walt Disney Studios Motion Pictures	Bill Condon
43	Cold War 2	HK$66,244,171	2016	Hong kong	Edko Films Ltd.	Longman Leung; Sunny Luk
44	Inside Out	HK$66,016,979	2015	US	Walt Disney Studios Motion Pictures	Pete Docter
45	Spiderman homecoming	HK$65,760,306	2017	US	Sony Pictures Releasing	Jon Watts
46	Doctor Strange in the Multiverse of Madness	HK$65,484,607	2022	US	Walt Disney Studios Motion Pictures	Sam Raimi
47	Black panther	HK$63,312,121	2018	US	Walt Disney Studios Motion Pictures	Ryan Coogler
48	Shang-Chi and the Legend of the Ten Rings	HK$63,079,202	2021	US	Walt Disney Studios Motion Pictures	Destin Daniel Cretton
49	Batman v Superman: Dawn of Justice	HK$62,972,176	2016	US	Warner Bros. Pictures	Zack Snyder
50	Jurassic Park	HK$62,234,335	1993	US	Universal Studios	Steven Spielberg

=== Top 25 highest-grossing animated films ===
Rank	Title	Gross	Year	Country	Distributor	Director
1	Demon Slayer: Kimetsu no Yaiba – The Movie: Infinity Castle	HK$97,600,936	2025	Japan	Sony Pictures	Haruo Sotozaki
2	Toy Story 3	HK$89,364,118	2010	US	Walt Disney Studios Motion Pictures	Lee Unkrich
3	Toy Story 4	HK$88,537,419	2019	US	Walt Disney Studios Motion Pictures	Josh Cooley
4	Inside out 2	HK$84,526,606	2024	US	Walt Disney Studios Motion Pictures	Kelsey Mann
5	Minions	HK$78,404,191	2015	US	Universal Studios	Pierre Coffin; Kyle Balda
6	Monsters University	HK$77,098,431	2013	US	Walt Disney Studios Motion Pictures	Dan Scanlon
7	Incredibles 2	HK$71,205,663	2018	US	Walt Disney Studios Motion Pictures	John Walker; Nicole Paradis Grindle
8	Zootopia 2	HK$69,531,373	2025	US	Walt Disney Studios Motion Pictures	Jared Bush; Byron Howard
9	Inside Out	HK$66,016,979	2015	US	Walt Disney Studios Motion Pictures	Pete Docter
10	Toy Story 5	HK$59,893,172	2026	US	Walt Disney Studios Motion Pictures	Andrew Stanton
11	Ne Zha 2	HK$58,771,093	2025	China	Beijing Enlight Pictures	Jiaozi
12	Frozen 2	HK$57,349,103	2019	US	Walt Disney Studios Motion Pictures	Chris Buck; Jennifer Lee
13	The Super Mario Bros. Movie	HK$52,521,301	2023	US; Japan	Universal Studios	Aaron Horvath; Michael Jelenic
14	Zootopia	HK$51,865,101	2016	US	Walt Disney Studios Motion Pictures	Byron Howard; Rich Moore
15	Despicable Me 3	HK$49,892,324	2017	US	Universal Studios	Pierre Coffin; Kyle Balda
16	Finding Dory	HK$49,524,251	2016	US	Walt Disney Studios Motion Pictures	Andrew Stanton
17	Stand by Me Doraemon	HK$46,891,675	2015	Japan	Toho	Takashi Yamazaki; Ryūichi Yagi
18	The Boss Baby	HK$41,766,789	2017	US	20th Century Fox	Tom McGrath
19	Coco	HK$40,701,893	2017	US	Walt Disney Studios Motion Pictures	Lee Unkrich; Adrian Molina(Canon)
20	Kung Fu Panda 2	HK$39,469,375	2011	US	Paramount Pictures	Jennifer Yuh Nelson
21	The First Slam Dunk	HK$39,461,276	2023	Japan	MediaLink	Takehiko Inoue
22	Minions: The Rise of Gru	HK$38,976,800	2022	US	Universal Studios	Kyle Balda
23	Ralph Breaks the Internet	HK$38,456,580	2018	US	Walt Disney Studios Motion Pictures	Phil Johnston; Rich Moore
24	The Lion King	HK$38,369,228	2019	US	Walt Disney Studios Motion Pictures	Jon Favreau
25	Ice Age: Continental Drift	HK$38,236,658	2012	US	20th Century Fox	Steve Martino; Mike Thurmeier

== Highest-grossing domestic films ==
Rank	Title	Gross	Year	Country	Distributor	Director
1	The Last Dance	HK$157,577,964	2024	Hong Kong	Emperor Motion Pictures	Anselm Chan
2	A Guilty Conscience	HK$115,060,394	2023	Hong Kong	Edko Films	Jack Ng
3	Night King	HK$113,000,000	2026	Hong Kong	Edko Films	Jack Ng
4	Twilight of the Warriors: Walled In	HK$108,448,257	2024	Hong Kong	Media Asia Films	Soi Cheang
5	Back to the Past	HK$91,157,394	2025	Hong Kong	One Cool Film	Ng Yuen-fai; Jack Lai
6	Warriors of Future	HK$81,821,966	2022	Hong Kong	One Cool Film	Ng Yuen-fai
7	Table for Six	HK$77,347,791	2022	Hong Kong	Edko Films	Sunny Chan
8	Cold War 2	HK$66,244,171	2016	Hong Kong/China	Edko Films	Sunny Luk; Longman Leung
9	Anita	HK$62,068,723	2021	Hong Kong	Edko Films	Longman Leung
10	Kung Fu Hustle	HK$61,278,697	2004	Hong Kong	Columbia Pictures	Stephen Chow
11	Shaolin Soccer	HK$60,739,847	2001	Hong Kong	Universe Entertainment	Stephen Chow
12	Ip Man 3	HK$60,422,830	2015	Hong Kong	Pegasus Motion Pictures	Wilson Yip
13	Police Story 4: First Strike	HK$57,518,795	1996	Hong Kong	Golden Harvest	Stanley Tong
14	Rumble in the Bronx	HK$56,912,536	1995	Hong Kong	Golden Harvest	Stanley Tong
15	The Mermaid	HK$56,225,252	2016	Hong Kong/China	Edko Films	Stephen Chow
16	Infernal Affairs	HK$55,057,176	2002	Hong Kong	Media Asia	Andrew Lau; Alan Mak
17	God of Gamblers Returns	HK$52,541,028	1994	Hong Kong	Golden Harvest	Wong Jing
18	CJ7	HK$51,402,777	2008	Hong Kong/China	Columbia Pictures	Stephen Chow
19	Justice, My Foot!	HK$49,884,734	1992	Hong Kong	Cosmopolitan Films	Johnnie To
20	All's Well, Ends Well	HK$48,992,188	1992	Hong Kong	Regal Films	Clifton Ko
21	Lust, Caution	HK$48,750,175	2007	Hong Kong/US/China/Taiwan	Edko Films	Ang Lee
22	Little Big Master	HK$46,729,492	2015	Hong Kong	Universe Films Distribution	Adrian Kwan
23	Thunderbolt	HK$45,647,210	1995	Hong Kong	Golden Harvest	Gordon Chan
24	Mr. Nice Guy	HK$45,420,457	1997	Hong Kong	Golden Harvest	Sammo Hung
25	Agent Mr Chan	HK$44,709,699	2018	Hong Kong	China Creative Digital	Jeff Cheung
26	Unbeatable	HK$44,631,344	2013	Hong Kong/China	Distribution Workshop	Dante Lam
27	Mama's Affair	HK$43,990,654	2022	Hong Kong	Emperor Motion Pictures	Kearen Pang
28	Fight Back to School	HK$43,829,449	1991	Hong Kong	Newport Entertainment	Gordon Chan
29	The Goldfinger	HK$43,690,958	2023	Hong Kong	Emperor Motion Pictures	Felix Chong
30	Ip Man 2	HK$43,313,345	2010	Hong Kong	Mandarin Films	Wilson Yip
31	The Sparring Partner	HK$43,012,421	2022	Hong Kong	Mei Ah	Ho Cheuk-Tin
32	Cold War	HK$42,819,043	2012	Hong Kong	Edko Films	Sunny Luk; Longman Leung
33	The Storm Riders	HK$41,532,235	1998	Hong Kong	Golden Harvest	Andrew Lau
34	All for the Winner	HK$41,326,156	1990	Hong Kong	Golden Harvest	Corey Yuen; Jeffrey Lau
35	3D Sex and Zen: Extreme Ecstasy	HK$41,078,280	2011	Hong Kong	Newport Entertainment	Christopher Suen
36	Cesium Fallout	HK$41,050,625	2024	Hong Kong	Edko Films	Anthony Pun
37	Drunken Master II	HK$40,971,484	1994	Hong Kong	Golden Harvest	Lau Kar-leung; Jackie Chan
38	Royal Tramp	HK$40,862,831	1992	Hong Kong	Golden Harvest	Wong Jing
39	The God of Cookery	HK$40,861,655	1996	Hong Kong	The Star Overseas	Stephen Chow; Lee Lik-chi
40	Love on a Diet	HK$40,435,886	2001	Hong Kong	China Star	Johnnie To; Wai Ka-Fai

=== By year of release ===
Year	English Title	Chinese Title	Director	Released	Gross
1970	The Chinese Boxer	龍虎鬥	Jimmy Wang	27 November 1970	HK$2,076,658
1971	The Big Boss	唐山大兄	Lo Wei	23 October 1971	HK$3,200,000 (estimated)
1972	Way of the Dragon	猛龍過江	Bruce Lee	30 December 1972	HK$5,307,350
1973	The House of 72 Tenants	七十二家房客	Chor Yuen	22 September 1973	HK$5,626,675
1974	Games Gamblers Play	鬼馬雙星	Michael Hui	17 October 1974	HK$6,251,633
1975	The Last Message	天才與白痴	Michael Hui	21 August 1975	HK$4,553,662
1976	The Private Eyes	半斤八兩	Michael Hui	16 December 1976	HK$8,531,700
1977	Money Crazy	發錢寒	John Woo	29 July 1977	HK$5,056,599
1978	The Contract	賣身契	Michael Hui	3 August 1978	HK$7,823,019
1979	The Fearless Hyena	笑拳怪招	Jackie Chan	17 February 1979	HK$5,445,535
1980	The Young Master	師弟出馬	Jackie Chan	9 February 1980	HK$11,026,283
1981	Security Unlimited	摩登保鑣	Michael Hui	30 January 1981	HK$17,769,048
1982	Aces Go Places	最佳拍檔	Eric Tsang	16 January 1982	HK$26,043,773
1983	Aces Go Places 2	最佳拍檔大顯神通	Eric Tsang	5 February 1983	HK$23,273,140
1984	Aces Go Places 3	最佳拍檔女皇密令	Tsui Hark	26 January 1984	HK$29,286,077
1985	My Lucky Stars	福星高照	Sammo Hung	10 February 1985	HK$30,748,643
1986	A Better Tomorrow	英雄本色	John Woo	2 August 1986	HK$34,651,324
1987	Armour of God	龍兄虎弟	Jackie Chan	21 January 1987	HK$35,469,408
1988	The Eighth Happiness	八星報喜	Johnnie To	11 February 1988	HK$37,090,776
1989	God of Gamblers	賭神	Wong Jing	14 December 1989	HK$37,058,686
1990	All For The Winner	賭聖	Jeffrey Lau and Corey Yuen	10 June 1990	HK$41,326,156
1991	Fight Back To School	逃學威龍	Gordon Chan	18 July 1991	HK$43,829,449
1992	Justice, My Foot!	審死官	Johnnie To	2 July 1992	HK$49,884,734
1993	Flirting Scholar	唐伯虎點秋香	Stephen Chow and Lee Lik-Chi	1 July 1993	HK$40,171,804
1994	God of Gamblers Returns	賭神2	Wong Jing	15 December 1994	HK$52,529,768
1995	Rumble in the Bronx	紅番區	Stanley Tong	21 January 1995	HK$56,911,136
1996	Police Story 4: First Strike	警察故事4之簡單任務	Stanley Tong	10 February 1996	HK$57,518,795
1997	Mr. Nice Guy	一個好人	Sammo Hung	31 January 1997	HK$45,420,457
1998	The Storm Riders	風雲雄霸天下	Andrew Lau	18 July 1998	HK$41,398,555
1999	King of Comedy	喜劇之王	Stephen Chow	13 February 1999	HK$29,848,860
2000	Needing You...	孤男寡女	Johnnie To and Wai Ka-fai	23 June 2000	HK$35,214,661
2001	Shaolin Soccer	少林足球	Stephen Chow	5 July 2001	HK$60,739,847
2002	Infernal Affairs	無間道	Andrew Lau and Alan Mak	12 December 2002	HK$55,057,176
2003	Infernal Affairs III	無間道III：終極無間	Andrew Lau and Alan Mak	12 December 2003	HK$30,225,661
2004	Kung Fu Hustle	功夫	Stephen Chow	23 December 2004	HK$61,278,697
2005	Initial D	頭文字D	Andrew Lau and Alan Mak	23 June 2005	HK$37,862,364
2006	Fearless	霍元甲	Ronny Yu	26 January 2006	HK$30,201,600
2007	The Warlords	投名狀	Peter Chan	13 December 2007	HK$27,919,869
2008	CJ7	長江七號	Stephen Chow	31 January 2008	HK$51,440,832
2009	All's Well, Ends Well 2009	家有囍事2009	Vincent Kok	23 January 2009	HK$24,655,932
2010	Ip Man 2	葉問2:宗師傳奇	Wilson Yip	29 April 2010	HK$43,313,345
2011	3D Sex and Zen: Extreme Ecstasy	3D肉蒲團之極樂寶鑑	Christopher Suen	14 April 2011	HK$41,078,280
2012	Cold War	寒戰	Longman Leung and Sunny Luk	8 November 2012	HK$42,820,819
2013	Unbeatable	激戰	Dante Lam	15 August 2013	HK$44,631,344
2014	Golden Chicken 3	金雞SSS	Matt Chow	30 January 2014	HK$41,277,620
2015	Ip Man 3	葉問3	Wilson Yip	24 December 2015	HK$60,422,830
2016	Cold War 2	寒戰II	Longman Leung and Sunny Luk	8 July 2016	HK$66,824,171
2017	Love Off the Cuff	春嬌救志明	Pang Ho-cheung	24 April 2017	HK$30,256,619
2018	Agent Mr Chan	棟篤特工	Jeff Cheung	15 February 2018	HK$44,709,699
2019	Integrity	廉政風雲 煙幕	Alan Mak	5 February 2019	HK$31,360,754
2020	The Grand Grandmaster	乜代宗師	Dayo Wong	23 January 2020	HK$29,456,956
2021	Anita	梅艷芳	Longman Leung	12 November 2021	HK$62,409,445
2022	Warriors of Future	明日戰記	Ng Yuen-fai	25 August 2022	HK$81,947,016
2023	A Guilty Conscience	毒舌大狀	Jack Ng	21 January 2023	HK$115,060,394
2024	The Last Dance	破·地獄	Anselm Chan	9 November 2024	HK$133,675,042

== Highest-grossing international films by year ==
Year	English Title	Director	Gross
2026	Spider-Man: Brand New Day	Destin Daniel Cretton	HK$101,214,007
2025	Demon Slayer: Kimetsu no Yaiba – The Movie: Infinity Castle	Haruo Sotozaki	HK$97,600,936
2024	Inside Out 2	Kelsey Mann	HK$84,526,606
2023	Oppenheimer	Christopher Nolan	HK$72,971,282
2022	Avatar: The Way of Water	James Cameron	HK$139,680,019
2021	Spider-Man: No Way Home	Jon Watts	HK$120,358,352
2020	Tenet	Christopher Nolan	HK$54,900,000
2019	Avengers: Endgame	Anthony and Joe Russo	HK$226,439,174
2018	Avengers: Infinity War	Anthony and Joe Russo	HK$153,301,337
2017	Beauty and the Beast	Bill Condon	HK$67,232,357
2016	Captain America: Civil War	Anthony and Joe Russo	HK$112,654,686
2015	Avengers: Age of Ultron	Joss Whedon	HK$132,746,652
2014	Transformers: Age of Extinction	Michael Bay	HK$98,196,851
2013	Iron Man 3	Shane Black	HK$106,389,801
2012	The Avengers	Joss Whedon	HK$96,705,670
2011	Transformers: Dark of the Moon	Michael Bay	HK$84,703,797
2010	Toy Story 3	Lee Unkrich	HK$89,364,118
2009	Avatar	James Cameron	HK$186,622,348
2008	The Dark Knight	Christopher Nolan	HK$59,778,126
2007	Harry Potter and the Order of the Phoenix	David Yates	HK$52,144,741
2006	Silent Hill	Christophe Gans	HK$63,466,336
2005	Harry Potter and the Goblet of Fire	Mike Newell	HK$34,975,416
2004	The Day After Tomorrow	Roland Emmerich	HK$42,633,223
2003	Finding Nemo	Andrew Stanton	HK$32,021,334
2002	Harry Potter and the Chamber of Secrets	Chris Columbus	HK$38,476,827
2001	Harry Potter and the Sorcerer's Stone	Chris Columbus	HK$5,014,325
2000	Mission: Impossible 2	John Woo	HK$4,675,113

== Inflation adjusted domestic films at the Hong Kong box office ==
=== 1980 to 2017 ===
#	English Title	Chinese Title	Director	Released	Gross	Gross (2019)
1	Aces Go Places	最佳拍檔	Eric Tsang	16 January 1982	HK$26,043,773	HK$116,516,782
2	A Better Tomorrow	英雄本色	John Woo	2 August 1986	HK$34,651,324	HK$113,050,001
3	Armour of God	龍兄虎弟	Jackie Chan	21 January 1987	HK$35,469,408	HK$111,935,579
4	The Eighth Happiness	八星報喜	Johnnie To	11 February 1988	HK$37,090,776	HK$110,792,568
5	Aces Go Places 3	最佳拍檔女皇密令	Tsui Hark	26 January 1984	HK$29,286,077	HK$107,443,963
6	All For The Winner	賭聖	Jeffrey Lau and Corey Yuen	10 June 1990	HK$41,326,156	HK$103,845,040
7	My Lucky Stars	福星高照	Sammo Hung	10 February 1985	HK$30,748,643	HK$103,828,611
8	God of Gamblers	賭神	Wong Jing	14 December 1989	HK$37,058,686	HK$102,601,458
9	Justice, My Foot!	審死官	Johnnie To	2 July 1992	HK$49,884,734	HK$102,115,766
10	Police Story 2	警察故事續集	Jackie Chan	20 August 1988	HK$34,151,609	HK$102,013,084
11	God of Gamblers II	賭俠	Wong Jing	13 December 1990	HK$40,342,758	HK$101,373,942
12	Dragons Forever	飛龍猛將	Sammo Hung	11 February 1988	HK$33,578,920	HK$100,302,425

=== 1980s ===
#	English Title	Chinese Title	Director	Released	Gross	Gross (2019)
1	Aces Go Places	最佳拍檔	Eric Tsang	16 January 1982	HK$26,043,773	HK$116,516,782
2	A Better Tomorrow	英雄本色	John Woo	2 August 1986	HK$34,651,324	HK$113,050,001
3	Armour of God	龍兄虎弟	Jackie Chan	21 January 1987	HK$35,469,408	HK$111,935,579
4	The Eighth Happiness	八星報喜	Johnnie To	11 February 1988	HK$37,090,776	HK$110,792,568
5	Aces Go Places 3	最佳拍檔女皇密令	Tsui Hark	26 January 1984	HK$29,286,077	HK$107,443,963
6	My Lucky Stars	福星高照	Sammo Hung	10 February 1985	HK$30,748,643	HK$103,828,611
7	God of Gamblers	賭神	Wong Jing	14 December 1989	HK$37,058,686	HK$102,601,458
8	Police Story 2	警察故事續集	Jackie Chan	20 August 1988	HK$34,151,609	HK$102,013,084
9	Dragons Forever	飛龍猛將	Sammo Hung	11 February 1988	HK$33,578,920	HK$100,302,425
10	Twinkle, Twinkle Lucky Stars	夏日福星	Sammo Hung	15 August 1985	HK$28,911,851	HK$97,626,335
11	Miracles	奇蹟	Jackie Chan	15 June 1989	HK$34,036,029	HK$94,232,866
12	Aces Go Places 2	最佳拍檔大顯神通	Eric Tsang	5 February 1983	HK$23,273,140	HK$93,828,327

=== 1990s ===
#	English Title	Chinese Title	Director	Released	Gross	Gross (2019)
1	All For The Winner	賭聖	Jeffrey Lau and Corey Yuen	10 June 1990	HK$41,326,156	HK$103,845,040
2	Justice, My Foot!	審死官	Johnnie To	2 July 1992	HK$49,884,734	HK$102,115,766
3	God of Gamblers II	賭俠	Wong Jing	13 December 1990	HK$40,342,758	HK$101,373,942
4	All's Well, Ends Well	家有囍事	Clifton Ko	25 January 1992	HK$48,992,188	HK$100,288,694
5	Fight Back To School	逃學威龍	Gordon Chan	18 July 1991	HK$43,829,449	HK$99,733,185
6	God of Gamblers Returns	賭神2	Wong Jing	15 December 1994	HK$52,529,768	HK$90,134,922
7	Rumble in the Bronx	紅番區	Stanley Tong	21 January 1995	HK$56,911,136	HK$89,803,969
8	Armour of God II: Operation Condor	飛鷹計劃	Jackie Chan	7 February 1991	HK$39,048,711	HK$88,854,695
9	To Be Number One	跛豪	Poon Man-Kit	5 April 1991	HK$38,703,363	HK$88,068,861
10	Royal Tramp	鹿鼎記	Wong Jing	30 July 1992	HK$40,862,831	HK$83,647,620
11	Police Story 4: First Strike	警察故事4之簡單任務	Stanley Tong	10 February 1996	HK$57,518,795	HK$83,207,587
12	King of Beggars	武狀元蘇乞兒	Gordon Chan	17 December 1992	HK$38,622,449	HK$79,061,481

=== 2000s ===
#	English Title	Chinese Title	Director	Released	Gross	Gross (2019)
1	Kung Fu Hustle	功夫	Stephen Chow	23 December 2004	HK$61,278,697	HK$89,251,271
2	Shaolin Soccer	少林足球	Stephen Chow	5 July 2001	HK$60,739,847	HK$82,151,743
3	Infernal Affairs	無間道	Andrew Lau and Alan Mak	12 December 2002	HK$55,057,176	HK$75,722,826
4	CJ7	長江七號	Stephen Chow	31 January 2008	HK$51,440,832	HK$71,585,762
5	Initial D	頭文字D	Andrew Lau and Alan Mak	23 June 2005	HK$37,862,364	HK$55,295,119
6	Love on a Diet	瘦身男女	Johnnie To and Wai Ka-fai	21 June 2001	HK$40,435,886	HK$54,690,268
7	Needing You...	孤男寡女	Johnnie To and Wai Ka-fai	23 June 2000	HK$35,214,661	HK$45,870,976
8	Fearless	霍元甲	Ronny Yu	26 January 2006	HK$30,201,600	HK$43,744,076
9	Infernal Affairs III	無間道III：終極無間	Andrew Lau and Alan Mak	12 December 2003	HK$30,225,661	HK$42,847,690
10	The Accidental Spy	特務迷城	Teddy Chan	18 January 2001	HK$30,009,076	HK$40,587,818
11	The Twins Effect	千機變	Dante Lam and Donnie Yen	8 March 2003	HK$28,423,960	HK$40,293,611
12	The Warlords	投名狀	Peter Chan	13 December 2007	HK$27,919,869	HK$39,642,399

=== 2010-2017 ===
#	English Title	Chinese Title	Director	Released	Gross	Gross (2019)
1	Cold War 2	寒戰II	Longman Leung and Sunny Luk	8 July 2016	HK$66,824,171	HK$70,475,288
2	Ip Man 3	葉問3	Wilson Yip	24 December 2015	HK$60,422,830	HK$65,635,918
3	The Mermaid	美人魚	Stephen Chow	8 February 2016	HK$56,225,252	HK$59,297,269
4	Ip Man 2	葉問2:宗師傳奇	Wilson Yip	29 April 2010	HK$43,313,345	HK$57,457,199
5	3D Sex and Zen: Extreme Ecstasy	3D肉蒲團之極樂寶鑑	Christopher Suen	14 April 2011	HK$41,078,280	HK$53,261,929
6	Unbeatable	激戰	Dante Lam	15 August 2013	HK$44,631,344	HK$52,822,008
7	Cold War	寒戰	Longman Leung and Sunny Luk	8 November 2012	HK$42,820,819	HK$52,736,795
8	Little Big Master	五個小孩的校長	Adrian Kwan	19 March 2015	HK$46,729,492	HK$50,761,163
9	Golden Chicken 3	金雞SSS	Matt Chow	30 January 2014	HK$41,277,620	HK$46,829,769
10	72 Tenants of Prosperity	72家租客	Eric Tsang	11 February 2010	HK$34,447,831	HK$45,696,676
11	From Vegas to Macau	賭城風雲	Wong Jing	30 January 2014	HK$33,563,074	HK$38,077,559
12	The White Storm	掃毒	Benny Chan	5 December 2013	HK$31,938,819	HK$37,800,174

== See also ==
- List of highest-grossing films in China
