= Sharla Cheung =

Hong Kong actress (born 1968)

- 張敏
- Born: 7 February 1968 (age 58); Shanghai, China
- Occupations: Actress; film producer
- Years active: 1986–1995, 2002–present

Chinese name
- Traditional Chinese: 張敏
- Simplified Chinese: 张敏
Transcriptions
Standard Mandarin
- Hanyu Pinyin: Zhāng Mǐn
Yue: Cantonese
- Jyutping: Zoeng1 Man5

Sharla Cheung Man (born 7 February 1968) is a Hong Kong actress and film producer.

== Career ==
Cheung was discovered by Wong Jing, who cast her in her first film role in the 1986 film The Magic Crystal. She continued to work with the director on many of his productions in the early 1990s as well. Cheung gained popularity with the numerous films she starred in alongside Stephen Chow, in which she was frequently cast as Chow's love interest after winning the Miss Asia contest. They partnered for more than 10 films from 1988 to 1994, including All for the Winner, God of Gamblers II, Fist of Fury 1991, Fight Back to School, Royal Tramp, and King of Beggars. Another frequent co-star is Andy Lau, who appeared alongside Cheung in such films as God of Gamblers, God of Gamblers II, and Lee Rock.

Cheung finished from the acting school after middle school.

After an impressive body of work in the early 1990s (she starred in about 50 films between 1990 and 1995), Cheung became a film producer in 1995 with Dream Lover (starring Tony Leung Ka-fai and Wu Chien-lien). However, Cheung was unhappy with it and she remade the film as Romantic Dream (starring Cheung and Lau Ching-wan). Both versions opened in 1995. The films, however, were commercial failures, and Cheung then retired from the film industry to focus on various business interests.

Cheung made a comeback in acting in the early 2000s to star in several television series. She appeared in such TV series as My Celebrity Boyfriend (Chinese: 我的明星仔男友) in 2003 and Legend of the Book's Tower (Chinese: 風滿樓) in 2005 alongside Nicky Wu. In 2002, she portrayed Diaochan, one of the Four Beauties of ancient China, opposite Ray Lui, in the television series Diao Chan (Chinese: 貂蝉).

== Filmography (as actress) ==
Year	Title	Role	Notes
1986	The Magic Crystal	Winnie Shen / 沈薇妮	
1987	The Romancing Star	Man / 阿敏	
1988	Bet on Fire 火舞風雲	Min / 程敏	
1988	Faithfully Yours	Ying / 阿英	
1989	Operation Pink Squad II 猛鬼大廈	Mun / 阿敏	a.k.a. Thunder Cops
1989	Dream of Desire 花心夢裡人	Sally Cheung	
1989	Little Cop	Dark Skin	
1989	The Romancing Star III	Auntie Man / 文文	
1989	God of Gamblers	Janet	
1990	Swordsman	Ren Yingying / 任盈盈	
1990	My Neighbours are Phantoms 嘩鬼住正隔籬	Siu Sin / 小倩	
1990	All for the Winner	Yee Mong / 綺夢	
1990	Story of Kennedy Town	Li / 麗	
1990	God of Gamblers II	Dream Lo / 夢籮	
1991	Fist of Fury 1991	Mandy Fok / 阿敏	
1991	Devil's Vindata 妖魔道	Mandy / 白敏兒	a.k.a. Devil's Vendetta
1991	A Chinese Legend 追日	Ching-er / 青兒	
1991	Fight Back to School	Miss Ho	
1991	God of Gamblers III: Back to Shanghai	Yee Mong / 綺夢	cameo
1991	Lee Rock	Grace / 白月嫦	
1991	Lee Rock II	Grace / 白月嫦	
1991	The Fatal Game 毒豪		a.k.a. Tricky Gambler
1991	Tiger Cage 3	Suki Cheung	
1991	Dances with Dragon	Moon / 陳月光	a.k.a. Dance with the Dragon
1991	Lover-at-Large 難得有情郎	Lily Lam / 林寶蓮	
1992	Fist of Fury 1991 II	Min (阿敏) / Yuen Chuen (婉君)	
1992	Truant Heroes 逃學英雄傳	Dreamy (Lam Moon) / 林夢想	a.k.a. Truant Hero
1992	Cheetah on Fire	Peggy	a.k.a. Fight to Survive in the Philippines
1992	Rhythm of Destiny	Siu Hong / 小紅	
1992	Fight Back to School II	Miss Ho	
1992	Royal Tramp	Empress Dowager (太后) / Lone-er (龍兒)	
1992	Deadly Dream Woman 女黑俠黃鶯	Huang Ying / 黃鶯	
1992	It's Now or Never 飛女正傳	Rose (Ying)	
1992	Royal Tramp II	Lone-er / 龍兒	bit part
1992	To Miss with Love 逃學外傳	Ms. Chang / 張敏	
1992	Call Girl '92 92應召女郎	Carmen	
1992	Handsome Siblings	Eva, Supreme Ruler of the Martial World / 移花官官主	
1992	Invincible 戰龍在野		
1992	King of Beggars	Yu-shang / 如霜	
1993	Fight Back to School III	Man / 阿敏	
1993	Legend of the Liquid Sword	Jellyfish / 水母陰姬	
1993	Last Hero in China	Ti Yin-er / 鐵燕兒	a.k.a. Claws of Steel
1993	Flying Dagger	Big Bewitchement / 大風騷	
1993	Holy Weapon	Spider / 蜘蛛	
1993	The Buddhist Spell	Shen / 湘兒	
1993	The Sword of Many Loves	Purple Yuen / 袁紫衣	
1993	Chez n' Ham 芝士火腿	Fanny / 粉腸	a.k.a. Curry and Pepper 3
1993	The Sword Stained with Royal Blood	Ah Kau / 阿九	
1993	Kung Fu Cult Master	Yan So-So (殷素素) / Chao Min (趙敏)	
1994	Underground Judgement 地下裁決	Senny/Lisa	
1994	The Dragon Chronicles – The Maidens	Purple / 阿紫	a.k.a. Demi-Gods and Semi-Devils
1994	Hail the Judge	Chi Siu-Lin / 戚秦氏	
1994	Crystal Fortune Run 暴風眼	Wind Yip / 葉風	
1994	God of Gambler's Return	Wan Yau, Ko Chun's wife / 溫柔	
1995	Romantic Dream 追女仔95之綺夢	Mandy	also producer
1995	Dragon Killer 狂情殺手	Lam Miu	
1995	Ten Brothers 十兄弟	Wai-leung / 慧娘	
1996	Back for Your Life 索命		a.k.a. Avenger (復仇者)
2000	Zhanguo Hongyan Xi Shi 戰國紅顏 西施	Xi Shi / 西施	TV series
2002	Diao Chan 貂蝉	Diao Chan / 貂蝉	TV series
2003	The Two Individual Package Women 兩個獨立包裝的女人	Christy Cheung	
2003	The Sixth Sense 第六感	Cheung Ying-yu (張影月) / Cheung Xin-yu (張星月)	
2003	Wo De Ming Xing Zai Nan You 我的明星仔男友	Li / 麗	TV series — a.k.a. My Celebrity Boyfriend
2004	Cang Hai You Long 沧海游龙	Jin Zhu (金珠) / Xin Yonglian (辛咏莲)	TV series — a.k.a. Chang Hai You Long
2005	Legend of the Book's Tower 風滿樓	Fang Yun'er (方云儿) / San Nainai (三奶奶)	TV series
2006	Fan Fu Da Yuan 范府大院	Nian Ren / 念人	TV series
2022	Inn 客栈	Yu Liufang / 玉留芳	short film

== Filmography (as producer) ==
Year	English Title	Chinese Title	Other notes
1995	Dream Lover	一千零一夜之夢中人	
1995	Romantic Dream	追女仔95之綺夢	also actress
