= Moses McCormick =

American YouTuber (1981–2021)

- McCormick in May 2020
- Born: Moses Monweal McCormick; March 12, 1981; Akron, Ohio, U.S.
- Died: March 4, 2021 (aged 39); Phoenix, Arizona, U.S.
- Occupations: YouTuber; language coach

YouTube information
- Channel: laoshu505000
- Years active: 2008–2021
- Genre: Entertainment
- Subscribers: 1.23 million
- Views: 220 million
- Last updated: May 2025
- Website: imabouttolevelup.biz

Moses Monweal McCormick (March 12, 1981 – March 4, 2021), also known as Laoshu (from Chinese: 老鼠; pinyin: lǎoshǔ, transl. mouse) or Laoshu505000, was an American YouTuber and language coach.

== Language learning ==
McCormick gained popularity by speaking several languages with native speakers that he met in public places, and uploading the videos on his YouTube channel. He called this activity "leveling up".

McCormick taught language lessons remotely over the Internet, over time developing his own language learning method, which he called FLR (Foreign Language Roadrunning). According to his YouTube biography, "When I first began language learning 20 years ago, I noticed that most language books and classes did not teach students how to prepare for real world conversations. In an attempt to solve this issue, I developed my own method, The FLR Method."

The foreign language in which McCormick was most fluent was Mandarin Chinese. He also spoke around twenty languages at a basic conversational level, including Japanese, Vietnamese, Cantonese, Korean, Somali, Spanish, and Swahili.

== Death ==
McCormick died on March 4, 2021, in Phoenix, Arizona, at the age of 39, reportedly from heart complications.
