= God of Gamblers Returns =

1994 Hong Kong film by Wong Jing

- Film poster
- Directed by: Wong Jing
- Written by: Wong Jing
- Produced by: Jimmy Heung
- Starring: Chow Yun-fat; Tony Leung Ka-fai; Sharla Cheung; Charles Heung; Jacklyn Wu; Chingmy Yau
- Cinematography: Horace Wong; Tony Miu
- Edited by: Poon Hung
- Music by: Lowell Lo
- Distributed by: Win's Movie Production and I/E Co. Ltd.
- Release date: 15 December 1994
- Running time: 126 minutes
- Country: Hong Kong
- Language: Cantonese
- Box office: HK$52,581,796

God of Gamblers Returns (Chinese: 賭神2; Cantonese Yale: Du shen xu ji; lit. 'God of Gamblers 2'), also known as God of Gamblers' Return and The Return of the God of Gamblers, is a 1994 Hong Kong action-drama-comedy film written and directed by Wong Jing. It starred Chow Yun-fat, Tony Leung Ka-fai, Sharla Cheung, Charles Heung, Jacklyn Wu, and Chingmy Yau. It is not to be confused with the 1991 God of Gamblers II, also directed by Wong Jing.

== Plot ==
Five years have passed since the events of the first God of Gamblers film. Ko Chun (Chow Yun-fat) is now living a peaceful retirement on his French estate with his pregnant wife Wan Yau (Sharla Cheung), while his disciples Knife and Sing (from the All For The Winner series) have become world-renowned in their own right. Chun declines repeated challenges from other top-ranked gamblers, having given up gambling in favor of the quiet life.

Chun's friend and former bodyguard, Dragon (Charles Heung), the "God Of Guns", comes to pay him a visit. While the two are away from the house for a friendly shooting competition, Chan Kam-Sing, Ko Chun's opponent from the first film, alongside Chau Siu-Chee (Wu Hsing-kuo), a Taiwanese gambler and the world's number one contender to Ko Chun's title, arrives and murders his wife and unborn son in order to goad Chun into a gambling match.

After a shootout with Chau Siu-Chee's assassins, Ko Chun arrives to discover his wife dying. With her last breath, she asks Chun to promise that he will not gamble or admit his real identity for a year, in the hopes that he will not lose his life in an impulsive act of revenge. Chun agrees as she dies in his arms. Nevertheless, he proclaims that he will avenge her after his promise is fulfilled.

Chun travels the world for eleven months anonymously. In the twelfth month, he arrives in mainland China and gets into a series of comic misadventures with a small-time hustler named Little Trumpet (Tony Leung Ka-fai), a police captain (Elvis Tsui), and Hoi Tong, a crime boss's daughter (Chingmy Yau). Hoi Tong also has a score to settle with Chau Siu-Chee after he sent assassins to murder her father.

Chun also becomes close with Little Trumpet's sister Yiu Yiu (Jacklyn Wu), who idolizes the God of Gamblers (but is unaware of Chun's true identity).

With three days before his promise ends, Ko Chun and his group arrive in Tainan to confront Chau Siu-Chee. Still bound to his word to keep his identity secret, Chun proclaims that he is Little Knife, the disciple of the God of Gamblers, with Little Trumpet posing as God of Gamblers, and that the latter will arrive in three days for a match with Chau to determine the true champion. The group retires to Hoi Tong's family compound to plan for the upcoming match.

Later, Chau Siu-Chee meets with Cheung Po-Sing, reputed to be the only person to have ever beaten Ko Chun in a poker match (by physically changing Chun's hole card using supernatural powers). Chau is initially skeptical but after a demonstration of Cheung's powers Chau is convinced and enlists his help.

Chan Kam-Sing arrives at Hoi Tong's home to warn Chun that Chau's men is outside waiting to ambush the latter upon confirming Little Trumpet's identity. When Chun questioned why he's helping them, Chan regretfully apologized and confessed his involvement with Chau Siu-Chee in the previous year as means of getting revenge back at Chun. After Chun's wife was murdered, he assisted Chau in seizing the funds from Save The World Kids worth US$1.6 billion that was supposed to be managed by Chun. Chan soon realized that Chau Siu-Chee is insane, so obsessed with gambling that he competed against Chan's wealth until Chan lost everything, culminating in gambling his hands in a match and subsequently had them amputated when he lost. With no means to seek revenge on Chun, Chan pleads Chun to avenge him before he is gunned down by Chau Siu-Chee's men, who then stormed the compound to kill Ko Chun and the group, but Dragon arrives to save them. In the ensuing firefight, Yiu Yiu was killed, with Chun promising to avenge them.

With his wife's year-long promise fulfilled, Ko Chun, Dragon, and the rest of the group head to Chau Siu-Chee's casino for the final showdown. As the five-card stud game proceeds, Ko Chun gains an early advantage, but ends up losing several rounds due to Cheung Po-Sing's interference. In desperation, he puts up his entire wealth and holdings and his eyes against Chau and the stolen funds for one final deciding round.

Chau agrees to match the bet and shows his straight flush, gloating that he has Ko Chun beaten, but Chun reveals his hand - a higher-ranked straight flush, indicating that he has won the game. Chun reveals that "Cheung Po-Sing" is a magician and a good friend of his, that all the instances of card changing were simply sleight of hand tricks, and that the rumors that Cheung had beaten the God of Gamblers were started by none other than Ko Chun himself, a year ago.

Ko Chun then demands that Chau make payment in full, including his eyes. Enraged, Chau removes a concealed pistol and attempts to kill Ko Chun, but is in turn killed by Chun, finally avenging his wife, Yiu Yiu, and all the other people Chau had hurt.

As the crowd cheers and applauds, Ko Chun and Dragon prepare to depart. Ko Chun notices Dragon is crying and remarks that he didn't think Dragon was capable of shedding tears. Dragon quips, "I was really afraid that you were going to lose all of my money." Ko Chun waves to the crowd one last time as the film ends.

== Cast ==
- Chow Yun-fat as Ko Chun
- Tony Leung Ka-fai as Little Trumpet
- Sharla Cheung as Wan Yau
- Charles Heung as Dragon
- Jacklyn Wu as Yiu Yiu
- Chingmy Yau as Hoi Tong
- Elvis Tsui as Capt. Koi Ching Chung
- Wu Hsing-kuo as Chau Siu Chee

== Box office ==
In Hong Kong the film grossed HK$52,581,796 making it the highest-grossing film in Hong Kong of 1994.
