= Cold War 2 (film) =

2016 Hong Kong film by Sunny Luk and Longman Leung

- Official film poster

Chinese name
- Traditional Chinese: 寒戰II 寒戦II
- Simplified Chinese: 寒战II
Transcriptions
Standard Mandarin
- Hanyu Pinyin: Hán Zhàn Èr
Yue: Cantonese
- Jyutping: Hon4 Zin3 Ji6
- Directed by: Longman Leung; Sunny Luk
- Written by: Jack Ng; Longman Leung; Sunny Luk
- Produced by: William Kong; Ivy Ho; Jiang Ping; Zhao Haicheng; Fan Kim-hung
- Starring: Aaron Kwok; Tony Leung; Chow Yun-fat; Charlie Young; Janice Man; Eddie Peng; Aarif Rahman; Tony Yang; Chang Kuo-chu; Wu Yue; Ma Yili; Bibi Zhou; Waise Lee; Frankie Lam
- Cinematography: Jason Kwan
- Edited by: Jordan Goldman; Ron Chan
- Music by: Peter Kam
- Production companies: Irresistible Films; Edko Films; EDKO (Beijing) Distribution; Shanghai Tencent Penguin Pictures; China Film Co. Homeland Pictures
- Distributed by: Edko Films
- Release date: 8 July 2016
- Running time: 110 minutes
- Countries: Hong Kong; China
- Languages: Cantonese; English
- Box office: US$115 million

Cold War 2 is a 2016 police procedural action thriller film written and directed by Longman Leung and Sunny Luk. A Hong Kong-Chinese co-production, the film is a sequel to the 2012 box office hit, Cold War, and stars returning cast members Aaron Kwok, Tony Leung, Charlie Young, Eddie Peng, Aarif Rahman and Ma Yili, joined by new cast members Chow Yun-fat, Janice Man, Tony Yang and Bibi Zhou. Cold War 2 was released on 8 July 2016 in 2D, 3D and IMAX 3D.

It will be followed by two prequels, Cold War 1994 and Cold War 1995.

== Plot ==
In early 2016, one to two months after the events of the "Cold War" operation, The Hong Kong Police Force holds a funeral for two Senior Assistant Commissioners (Note: Identified as senior assistant commander and Albert Kwong (Gordon Lam) and superintendent Vincent Tsui (Chin Kar-lok).) killed previously. Shortly after, Commissioner Sean Lau receives a call from one of the culprits behind the theft of the police van. He is told that his wife has been kidnapped and that he must release Joe Lee for her to survive. Lau overrides standard procedure to transfer Joe out of prison, and is told by the kidnapper to bring Joe to the metro station. There, Joe is able to escape with the aid of several accomplices, one of whom sets off a bomb. The culprits leave Lau's wife alive at their hideout.

Lau's actions are criticized by the media and by numerous politicians, leading to a public inquiry. Fearing that the police have been infiltrated, Lau privately requests Billy Cheung, an ICAC Principal Investigator who assisted him previously, to form a separate squad independent of the police in order to track the culprits. Meanwhile, MB Lee, the deputy police commissioner approaching retirement, is confronted by his fugitive son along with Peter Choi, a former police commissioner and Lee's former mentor who is now manipulating politics behind the scenes. Choi is revealed as the mastermind behind the troubles of the EU police van disappearance, and his current goal is to remove Lau, who is not a member of his ring, and to place his own followers into positions of power during the next election. Choi has formed a militant band consisting of former police officers who were expelled or faked their own deaths, who had helped Lee take the fall for an operation he led in 1995. He promises Lee not only the position of commissioner, but also of security secretary later on, upon which Lee gives into temptation and help his son. Despite this, Lee tries to convince Joe to leave Choi's team for his safety.

Legislator Oswald Kan is convinced by his old friend and junior Edward Lai, the current secretary of justice, to participate in the public inquiry into Lau. He chastises Lau for his methods of "desperate times, desperate measures" and disagrees with the "Cold War" operation being a successful failure. During another hearing, Kan is taken aback when Lee openly criticizes Lau, rather than defending him initially. Kan and Lau deduce that Lee is being controlled, as Kan tells his one of his pupils, Bella Au, to investigate. Lau also asks Cheung and his independent team to monitor both Lee and Kan, who he finds suspicious as Kan did not sign up for the public hearing until deadline and likely changed his mind. Au decides to secretly follow Lee, and later Choi whom Lee confers with. Realizing that they are being followed in a tunnel, Choi orders his subordinate to crash into Au's car, causing a chain collision in which Au is killed, and Choi's car is trapped. Lau arrives to investigate, and a shoot-out occurs, in which Joe is shot and severely injured by Lau, but Choi escapes. Lee accosts Lau for failing to keep his promise of Joe's safety and nearly fight before Kan interferes. Afterwards, Kan finds photographic evidence taken by Au of Choi and Lee together.

Lau's independent team finds the location of Choi's remaining henchmen and the stolen police van. Lee, meanwhile, convinces and bribes several senior police officers to sign a petition for Lau's removal, to which some comply. In the final hours before Lau steps down, he launches a raid on the henchmen, and requests that Lee take command, noting that the henchmen were former renegade police officers who had worked under Lee, as he would understand their strategies. Lee accepts, knowing that he cannot refuse without looking weak. The operation is a success, with all suspects killed. However, with Choi's henchmen dead, this taxes Lee emotionally due to his close friendships. Kan and Lau report Lee's and Choi's crimes to the chief executive, who decides to grant pardon to both men since they are too important to arrest without destabilizing society. Lee is forced into retirement, and Choi is permanently exiled from Hong Kong without returning, with their exact crimes not disclosed to the public. Lau retains his office as commissioner, and Lee visits his son, unconscious and in custody at a hospital bed.

Elsewhere, Lai continues his campaign to be elected as the future Chief Executive of Hong Kong, hoping to control the government's politics, leaving more mysteries unsolved.

== Cast ==
- Aaron Kwok as Sean Lau (劉傑輝), Commissioner of Police
- Tony Leung Ka-fai as M.B. Lee (李文彬), retired Deputy Commissioner of Police (Operations)
- Chow Yun-fat as Oswald Kan (簡奧偉), Ex-judge, Court of First Instance of High Court / Senior Counsel / Current Legislator
- Charlie Young as Phoenix Leung (梁紫薇), Senior Assistant Commissioner of Police, Director of Management Services
- Janice Man as Isabel Au (歐詠恩), Barrister & mentee of Oswald Kan
- Eddie Peng as Joe Lee (李家俊), Ex-police constable / criminal & son of M.B. Lee
- Aarif Rahman as Billy Cheung (張國標), ICAC Principal Investigator
- Tony Yang as Roy Ho, Ex-Senior Police Constable
- Chang Kuo-chu as Peter Choi (蔡元祺), former Commissioner of Police (Cantonese dub: Kwok Fung)
- Wu Yue as Wu Tin-man, Ex-Senior Inspector of Police
- Ma Yili as Michelle Lau (陳雪兒), wife of Sean Lau
- Bibi Zhou as Alice Poon, Barrister
- Alex Tsui as Matthew Mak (麥啟文), ICAC Head of Operations
- Fan Zhibo as Rachel Ma, S.I.P. (VIP Protection Unit)
- Frankie Lam as Alan Au, current Deputy Commissioner of Police (Management)
- Kenny Wong as Stephen Han, current Deputy Commissioner of Police (Operations) / co-conspirator of Peter Choi
- Ram Chiang as David Mok, Senior Assistant Commissioner of Police, Director of Crime & Security, Phoenix Leung's mentor / co-conspirator of M.B. Lee
- Waise Lee as Edward Lai (黎永廉), Secretary of Justice / co-conspirator of Peter Choi
- King Kong Lam as Gary Fu, Ex-Senior Inspector of Police
- Vincent Lam as Neo Chan, Ex-Senior Inspector of Police
- Wong Man-piu as Eric Ma, Ex-Senior Inspector of Police
- Brian Wong as Mark Cheng, Ex-Senior Inspector of Police
- Felix Lok as C.Y. Ma, Member of the Legislative Council / Chairman of Security Panel Council / co-conspirator of Peter Choi
- Terence Yin as To Man, Chief Superintendent, Director of Information Technology
- Jeannie Chan as Nicole Chan, ICAC Assistant Investigator
- Kathy Yuen as Cecilia Lai, Probationary Inspector of Police and secretary to Commissioner
- Dexter Young as Senior Inspector of Police, Technology Crime Division
- Queenie Chu as Amber Tsui, cigar lounge owner / co-conspirator of Peter Choi
- Leila Tong as Karen Tang, hostage

== Production ==
Due to the critical and commercial success Cold War, a sequel was first announced in February 2013, where Chow Yun-fat was reported to join the sequel as the film's main antagonist. At that time, co-director Sunny Luk also confirmed that the script for Cold War 2 was being written and was due to start production by the end of 2013. Production for Cold War 2 began in September 2015 and wrapped in December of the same year. The film was released on 8 July 2016.

== Reception ==
Cold War 2 has grossed US$115 million worldwide.

In Hong Kong, the film has grossed a total of HK$66,244,171, breaking the record as the highest-grossing domestic film in Hong Kong, and was also the third highest-grossing film of 2016 in the territory.

== Future ==
Two prequels, Cold War 1994 and Cold War 1995, were announced at the Hong Kong Cinema panel for 2025 Cannes Film Festival from Edko. Both films were shot simultaneously back to back in 2024 with Longman Leung returning as director and writer, in addition to new cast members including Daniel Wu, Terrance Lau and Wu Kang-ren. The story follows a younger MB Lee during the years leading up to the Handover of Hong Kong as he navigates the world between the triads, police force, and the colonial and elite circle.

A first poster and teaser trailer for Cold War 1994 was released on June 17th, 2025, and officially released on May 1st, 2026, while Cold War 1995 is slated to release either in late 2026 or 2027.

== Awards and nominations ==
Award ceremony	Category	Recipient(s)	Result	Ref.
36th Hong Kong Film Awards	Best Film	Cold War 2	Nominated	
36th Hong Kong Film Awards	Best Screenplay	Longman Leung, Sunny Luk, Jack Ng	Nominated	
36th Hong Kong Film Awards	Best Actor	Tony Leung	Nominated	
36th Hong Kong Film Awards	Best Supporting Actress	Janice Man	Nominated	
36th Hong Kong Film Awards	Best Cinematography	Jason Kwan	Nominated	
36th Hong Kong Film Awards	Best Film Editing	Jordan Goldman, Ron Chan	Nominated	
36th Hong Kong Film Awards	Best Action Choreography	Chin Ka-lok	Nominated	
36th Hong Kong Film Awards	Best Original Film Score	Peter Kam	Nominated	
36th Hong Kong Film Awards	Best Sound Design	Kinson Tsang, George Lee	Won	
36th Hong Kong Film Awards	Best Visual Effects	Yee Kwok-leung, Raymond Leung	Nominated	
53rd Golden Horse Awards	Best Actor	Tony Leung	Nominated	
53rd Golden Horse Awards	Best Visual Effects	Yee Kwok-leung, Raymond Leung	Nominated	
53rd Golden Horse Awards	Best Action Choreography	Chin Ka-lok	Nominated	
11th Asian Film Awards	Best Sound Design	Kinson Tsang, George Lee	Nominated	
24th Beijing College Student Film Festival	Best Visual Effects	Yee Kwok-leung, Raymond Leung	Nominated	
