= Longman Leung =

Hong Kong filmmaker (born 1972)

- 梁樂民
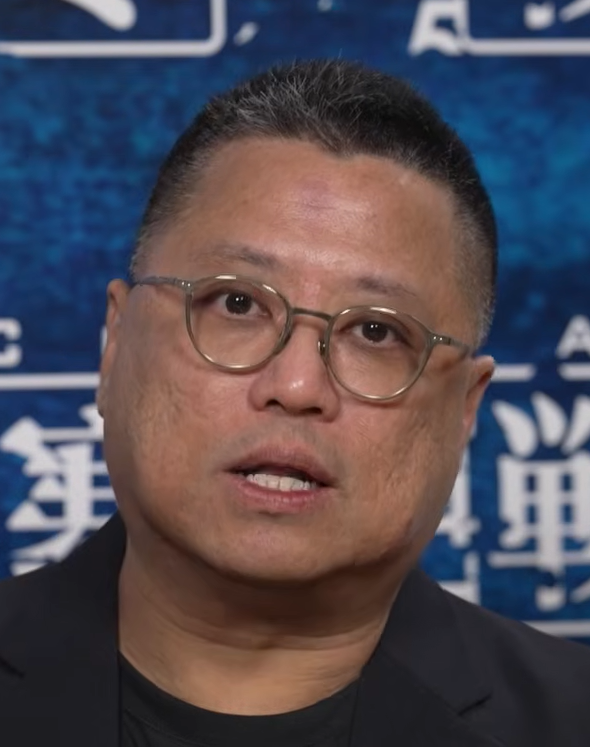
- Leung in April 2026
- Born: Leung Lok-man; 1972 (age 53–54); Hong Kong
- Education: Ying Wa College
- Occupations: Director; Screenwriter; Art director
- Years active: 1994–present

Longman Leung Lok-man (Chinese: 梁樂民; born 1972) is a Hong Kong filmmaker. Beginning his career as a set designer, he served as an art director for the films Bug Me Not! (2005), Connected (2008), and The Legend Is Born: Ip Man (2010). He made his directorial debut with Sunny Luk with Cold War (2012), for which they won both Best Director and Best Screenplay in the 32nd Hong Kong Film Awards. The duo continued to co-direct and co-write the action thrillers Helios (2015) and Cold War 2 (2016), before they broke their partnership. Leung made his solo directorial debut with Anita (2021), which earned him another nomination for Best Director in the 40th Hong Kong Film Awards. Cold War 2 and Anita are currently the eighth and ninth highest-grossing domestic films of all time in Hong Kong.

== Biography ==
Leung was born in 1972. He graduated from Ying Wa College, where he attended the Oxford Road campus. In the 1990s, he studied design. During that time, he followed a classmate to work on set design at RTHK as a summer job. After the summer job and upon graduation, he began searching for work, and a colleague at RTHK referred him to work on film set design. Leung entered the film industry in 1994, and worked for United Filmmakers Organization Limited. His first job was as a set designer for the 1996 film Lost and Found. He was then promoted, starting as an assistant art director for the 1999 film Purple Storm, and continued in the same role for The Accidental Spy and The Twins Effect. He was interested in writing and began writing screenplays while working as a set designer, starting to learn screenwriting in 2000. He served as the art director for the 2005 film Bug Me Not!, and continued working on films such as Connected, Vengeance, and The Legend Is Born: Ip Man. In 2008, he and Sunny Luk, an assistant director he befriended on the set of The Twins Effect and both aspiring to become directors, came up with the story that eventually evolved into Cold War. They chose to produce a police film because it was a genre they were most familiar with, and completed the screenplay in 2010 when producer Bill Kong joined the project. They made their directorial debut with the film, winning both Best Director and Best Screenplay in the 32nd Hong Kong Film Awards. Andrew Heskins of EasternKicks compared the duo to the creators of Infernal Affairs, Alan Mak and Felix Chong, stating that "the film has similar pretensions to keeping one step ahead of the audience, and largely is more effective than many of Mak and Chong’s most recent films"; while James Marsh of ScreenAnarchy commended the film's visual quality as "fantastic", which "benefits greatly from Leung's previous experience as an Art Director".

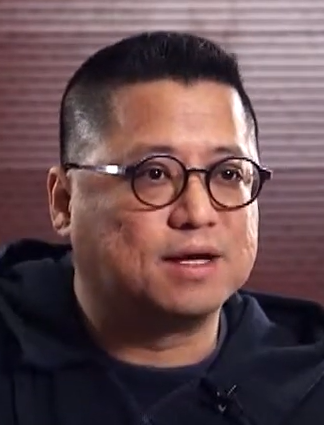
Leung interviewed by Kbro Cinemas in April 2015.

Leung and Luk continued their collaboration and co-directed another action thriller Helios in 2015. Clarence Tsui of The Hollywood Reporter found the film to be a "mixed blessing" for the duo, as "they could now line up brighter stars and bigger explosions in a shoot spread out across several countries" but criticized the plot as "over-complicated". They then co-directed and co-wrote Cold War 2, the sequel to Cold War, in 2016, earning a nomination for Best Screenplay in the 36th Hong Kong Film Awards. Maggie Lee of Variety praised their effort, saying they "[did] an admirable job walking the tightrope of servicing the mainland market while making an eloquent defense of the former British colony's benchmarks, namely rule of law and clean governance"; but James Marsh of Screen International considered the film as "somewhat naive in Hong Kong's current climate" as the duo "tread incredibly carefully to avoid mentioning China". The film became the then highest-grossing domestic film of all time in Hong Kong, and is currently the eighth highest-grossing. After producing Helios and Cold War 2, Leung and Luk decided to end their partnership due to creative differences and they did not want this to affect their friendship, where they resigned from all joint directing contracts to pursue individual projects. Leung was approached by Bill Kong on the anniversary of Anita Mui's death in 2015 to make a biographical film about Mui. He co-wrote Anita with his Cold War 2 co-writer Jack Ng, and the film marked his solo directorial debut. Richard Kuipers of Variety praised his direction as having "the gloss and nostalgic appeal to become a hit"; while Kevin Chen of HK01 praised his creative approach as "brilliant". He received another nomination for Best Director in the 40th Hong Kong Film Awards, and the film is currently the ninth highest-grossing domestic film of all time. In 2026, he is set to direct and write Cold War 1994, a prequel to Cold War and Cold War 2.

== Filmography ==
=== Film ===
Year	Title	Director	Screenwriter	Art director	Notes/Ref.
1999	Purple Storm	No	No	Assistant	
2001	The Accidental Spy	No	No	Assistant	
2003	The Twins Effect	No	No	Assistant	
2005	Bug Me Not!	No	No	Yes	
2007	The Haunted School	No	No	Yes	
2008	Hong Kong Bronx	No	No	Yes	
2008	Connected	No	No	Yes	
2009	Vengeance	No	No	Assistant	
2010	The Legend Is Born: Ip Man	No	No	Yes	
2012	Cold War	Yes	Yes	No	Co-directed and written with Sunny Luk
2013	Together	No	No	Yes	
2015	Helios	Yes	Yes	No	Co-directed and written with Sunny Luk
2016	Cold War 2	Yes	Yes	No	Co-directed and written with Sunny Luk
2021	Anita	Yes	Yes	No	
2026	Cold War 1994	Yes	Yes	No	
2027	Cold War 1995 †	Yes	Yes	No	

== Awards and nominations ==
Year	Award	Category	Work	Result	Ref.
2013	32nd Hong Kong Film Awards	Best Director	Cold War	Won	
2013	32nd Hong Kong Film Awards	Best Screenplay	Cold War	Won	
2013	50th Golden Horse Awards	Best New Director	Cold War	Nominated	
2017	36th Hong Kong Film Awards	Best Screenplay	Cold War 2	Nominated	
2022	40th Hong Kong Film Awards	Best Director	Anita	Nominated	
2022	35th Golden Rooster Awards	Best Director	Anita	Nominated	
