= The Buddhist Spell =

- 菩薩戒
- Directed by: Chao Lu-chiang
- Written by: Wu Wen-Liang; Kai Huang; Cheng Man-Wah
- Starring: Sharla Cheung; Wu Ma
- Release date: 1993
- Running time: 94 minutes
- Country: Taiwan
- Language: Mandarin

The Buddhist Spell (Taiwanese: 菩薩戒, Romanized: Pu ti you hun) is a 1993 Taiwanese fantasy film directed by Chao Lu-chiang and starring Sharla Cheung.

== Premise ==
Shen is assaulted by the local magistrate and attacks him with a knife in revenge but is stopped and beaten to death. Her revenge-seeking spirit fills a log that a scholar was planning to carve into a Buddha idol.

== Cast ==
- Sharla Cheung as Shen
- Wu Ma as Mong Fa Da
- Mark Cheng as Feng Yun-Tin
- Lau Shun as Head of Da Hung Religion
- Paulinge Wong Yuk-Wan as Madam Ba
- Fong Lung as Mr. Register
- Chang Pao-Shan as Teacher
- Tang Heng-Wu as Chiao Kwai
- Wank Chun-Kang
- Wang Yao as Lau Tang

== Reception ==
The review website sogoodreviews.com wrote, "A perfectly adequate time cut out of the A Chinese Ghost Story-mold (Wu Ma co-stars as well!) with an unusually good sense when it comes to mixing the moods. Unusual because The Buddhist Spell doesn't bring in comedy a whole lot. The freaky sights of the Blood Kid slowly being born throughout the movie plus skilled wirework- and animated effects (complemented by fine editing) are driving forces for a standard time with 90s Hong Kong cinema. The core romance isn't particularly noteworthy though but no one makes an ass out of him or herself here."

Reviewer Andrew Pragasam of thespinningimage.co.uk gave the film a score of 5 out of 10 stars, writing, "Many Hong Kong fantasies do a remarkable job interweaving seemingly disparate tones (sometimes even genres). Here however the doggedly downbeat plot and undeniably delirious horror imagery sit uneasily besides tedious time-wasting comedy and a romance that proves more depressing than enchanting."
