= God of Gamblers II =

1990 Hong Kong film by Wong Jing

- Film poster

Chinese name
- Traditional Chinese: 賭俠
- Simplified Chinese: 赌侠
Transcriptions
Standard Mandarin
- Hanyu Pinyin: Dǔ Xiá
Yue: Cantonese
- Jyutping: Dou2 Hap6
- Directed by: Wong Jing
- Written by: Wong Jing; Corey Yuen
- Produced by: Jimmy Heung
- Starring: Andy Lau; Stephen Chow; Monica Chan; Ng Man-tat; Sharla Cheung; Charles Heung; Chow Yun-fat
- Cinematography: David Chung
- Edited by: Poon Hung
- Music by: Lowell Lo
- Production company: Win's Movie Production & I/E Co. Ltd.
- Distributed by: Golden Harvest
- Release date: 13 December 1990
- Running time: 99 minutes
- Country: Hong Kong
- Language: Cantonese
- Box office: HK$40,342,758

God of Gamblers II (Chinese: 賭俠; Cantonese Yale: Dou Hap; lit. 'Knight of Gambling') is a 1990 Hong Kong action comedy film written and directed by Wong Jing. It stars Andy Lau as the Knight of Gamblers, Stephen Chow as the Saint of Gamblers, and Ng Man-tat as Blackie Tat. This film is a sequel to both God of Gamblers, which included Lau's character, and to All for the Winner, which starred Chow and Ng. This film should not be confused with God of Gamblers Returns, also released as God of Gamblers 2, and in essence the true sequel to the original God of Gamblers.

In this film, down on his luck Sing (Chow) seeks out the God of Gamblers in hopes of becoming his disciple. Unfortunately, the God of Gamblers is unreachable and out of the country, last heard to be in Brazil, and Michael Chan, the Knight of Gamblers (Lau) replaces the God of Gamblers. When a phony attempts to impersonate the Knight of Gamblers in a huge scam, it's up to the real Knight and Saint of Gamblers to team up and defeat their formidable challenger. The film combines intricate action sequences with sharp comedic timing.

== Plot ==
After being mentored by the God of Gamblers Ko Chun, Michael Chan/Little Knife (Andy Lau) has become a top gambler and become renowned in the United States, where he is branded as the Knight of Gamblers. Having achieved success and fortune, Michael currently inhabits in a villa previously owned by his Kuwaiti neighbour, Sam, who has gone broke after Iraq's invasion of Kuwait. Ko's friend, Mr. Ueyama plans to announce Michael's identity and his charity casino project to the Hong Kong press, but Ko's rival, Chan Kam-sing, who is imprisoned after being defeated by Ko, wants to seek revenge, so Chan's godson, Hussein, schemes to destroy Michael's reputation by impersonating him. On the other hand, Sing (Stephen Chow), despite a world champion gambler and branded as the Saint of Gamblers, is living in poverty since he cannot spend any money won by using his supernatural powers as it gives him bad luck, so his uncle, Blackie Tat (Ng Man-tat) suggests him to plead the God of Gamblers to accept him as a disciple. After sending a video to Michael which he dismisses, Sing and Tat march into Michael's mansion where they are kicked out by the latter. They sneak in again at night but is caught and beaten by Michael's bodyguard, Lung Ng (Charles Heung), but they refuse to leave and stays outside all night. The next day, Hussein sends killers to Michael's mansion. While Michael defeats several assassins and successfully escapes with Sing and Tat, Ng was knocked out in an explosion and was abducted by Black Panther.

Michael brings Sing and Tat to his village old home, which is inhabited by his underling, Raven, and Sam. There they call to find out about Ng's whereabouts to no avail and find out that Mr. Ueyama is dead who is the only person that held proof that Michael is the Knight of Gamblers. Sing comes up with an idea to find out where Long Ng is. Using his supernatural powers, Sing sees an unconscious Ng being brought to a bar, so he visits the bar with Tat where they meet the owner, Dream (Sharla Cheung), who looks exactly like Sing's old crush, Yee-mung. Tat becomes smitten with Dream, much to Sing's dismay, and pleads Sing to transfer some of his supernatural powers to him. Tat uses the powers to win stud poker game at Dream's house and gives some of his winnings to Dream, causing himself and Sing (whose power energy is connected to) to lose their supernatural powers. It is then revealed that Hussein found out from a mainland Chinese supernatural power expert, Tai-kwan, how to get rid of Sing's powers and forced Dream, who owes him HK$2 million to manipulate Tat. Hussein then attempts to rape Dream and kidnaps Tat.

Meanwhile, Michael finds out from the newspaper that Hussein's (fraudently using the name Knight of Gamblers) schemes were the latter plans to announce to the press about a fraud casino ship project to scam patrons, Michael plans to expose Hussein and prove himself to be the true Knight of Gamblers. With the help of Sing, Michael manages to win enough funds from Brother Kau's gambling den and confronts Hussein on his ship the next day to face off with him. However, Hussein's ship is surveilled with high technology to help him cheat and since Sing lost his supernatural power, Michael loses. When Michael attempts to calls his mentor in Brazil to expose Hussein to the press, he discovers Tat and Ng have been captured and backs off. While feeling hopeless, Sam scolds Michael and Sing before returning to Kuwait to fight for his country, which motivates to confront Hussein at his ship again the next day. Knife publicly asks Hussein for HK$20, which he is able to use and win HK$25 million while Sing (having freed Tat and Lung) helps him distract Tai-kwan, allowing him to enter into the King of Cards competition. As other players are eliminated, Michael, Sing, Hussein and Tai-kwan remain at the table. While Hussein and Tai-kwan try to cheat, Michael and Sing work together and eventually defeat Hussein and causes Tai-kwan to lose his supernatural power because of cussing. Hussein's henchmen attempt to kill them, but Michael, Sing takes them down with the help of Ng and his younger sister, Kowloon and Michael exposes Hussein to the public before flykicking his face with Sing. In the end, Michael proposes a plan to Sing where the two agree to give each other their winnings, since Ko demands Michael to donate most of his winnings to charity and Sing would lose his powers if he spends his winnings, but Ko arrives to interrupt them.

== Cast ==
- Andy Lau as Michael Chan / Little Knife (陳刀仔), the first disciple of the God of Gamblers, Ko Chun, who has become a top gambler in his own right and branded as the Knight of Gamblers (賭俠) after inheriting his mentor's skills and touring around the world participating in charity events. He teams up with Sing, whom he initially considered a nuisance, to defeat Hussien when the latter steals his identity to ruin his reputation.
- Stephen Chow as Chow Sing-cho (周星祖), known as the Saint of Gamblers (賭聖), a world champion gambler with supernatural powers who seeks to become a disciple of the God of Gamblers. Initially rebuffed by Michael, Sing later assists him to defeat Hussein.
- Monica Chan as Long Kau / Kowloon (龍九), Lung Ng's tough younger sister who works for the Interpol and is Michael's love interest.
- Ng Man-tat as Uncle Three (三叔), nicknamed Blackie Tat (黑仔達), Sing's third uncle who suggests him to become a disciple of the God of Gamblers.
- Sharla Cheung as Madame Dream (夢蘿), a bar owner who resembles Sing's old crush, Yee-mung, was forced by Hussein, who she is indebt HK$2 million, to manipulate Tat to cause Sing to lose his supernatural powers. She later helps Sing regain his powers and becomes his lover.
- Charles Heung as Lung Ng (龍五), Michael and Ko Chun's bodyguard who was a former operative of the Army of the Republic of Vietnam Special Forces.
- Pal Sinn as Hussein (侯賽因), Chan Kam-sing's godson who helps his godfather seek revenge by impersonating Michael's identity as the Knight of Gamblers to swindle money.
- Blackie Ko as Black Panther (黑豹), Hussein's top henchmen who proves to be a match to Lung Ng
- John Ching as Tai-kwan (大軍), a supernatural power expert from China hired by Hussein.
- Ronald Wong as Raven (烏鴉), Michael's close friend and underling.
- Shing Fui-On as Brother Kau (大口九), owner of an illegal gambling den that Michael used to frequent in the past.
- Pau Hon Lam as Chan Kam-sing (陳金城), known as the Beast of Gamblers, a Singaporean gambler and swindler who is imprisoned after being defeated by Ko Chun.
- Luk Chuen as Mr. Yama (上山宏次), Ko Chun's good friend who was later killed by Black Panther.
- Kirk Wong as C.N. Tai, a cocky gambler who was defeated by Michael in a game of Blackjack during a charity event in San Francisco.
- Wong Jing as Ham Ka-chan (冚家剷), Michael's neighbour who mistakes Sing for calling him when the latter was singing. (uncredited cameo)
- Mansook Ahmed as Sam (阿三), Michael's formerly rich Kuwaiti neighbour who gone broke after Kuwait was invaded by Iraq and ended living in Michael's old village home rented to him by Raven.
- Chow Yun-fat as Ko Chun, known as God of Gamblers, an internationally renowned gambler and Michael's mentor who eventually accepts Sing as his second disciple. Chow makes uncredited cameo appearance in the ending through archive footage.

== Title ==
Even though the international English title is God of Gamblers II, this is not the direct sequel to the 1989 film starring Chow Yun-fat. This film's title literally translates to The Knight of Gamblers, the name of Andy Lau's character.

== Significance of the film ==
Wong Jing was so impressed with All for the Winner that he contacted Stephen Chow to star in two sequels made during 1991. This combo went on to make several money making films turning Stephen Chow into an Asian Comedy star and helping boost Wong Jing's status as one of the top film makers in Hong Kong.

This film is followed by God of Gamblers III: Back to Shanghai, which does not have Andy Lau, but features actress Gong Li in two roles.

== See also ==
- God of Gamblers (1989)
- All for the Winner (1990)
- God of Gamblers III: Back to Shanghai (1991)
- God of Gamblers Returns (1994)
- God of Gamblers 3: The Early Stage (1997)
- Andy Lau filmography
- Wong Jing filmography
