= Shenzhen Grand Theater =

Theater in Luohu, Shenzhen, China

Coordinates: 22.545244°N 114.100470°E

Shenzhen Grand Theater 深圳大剧院
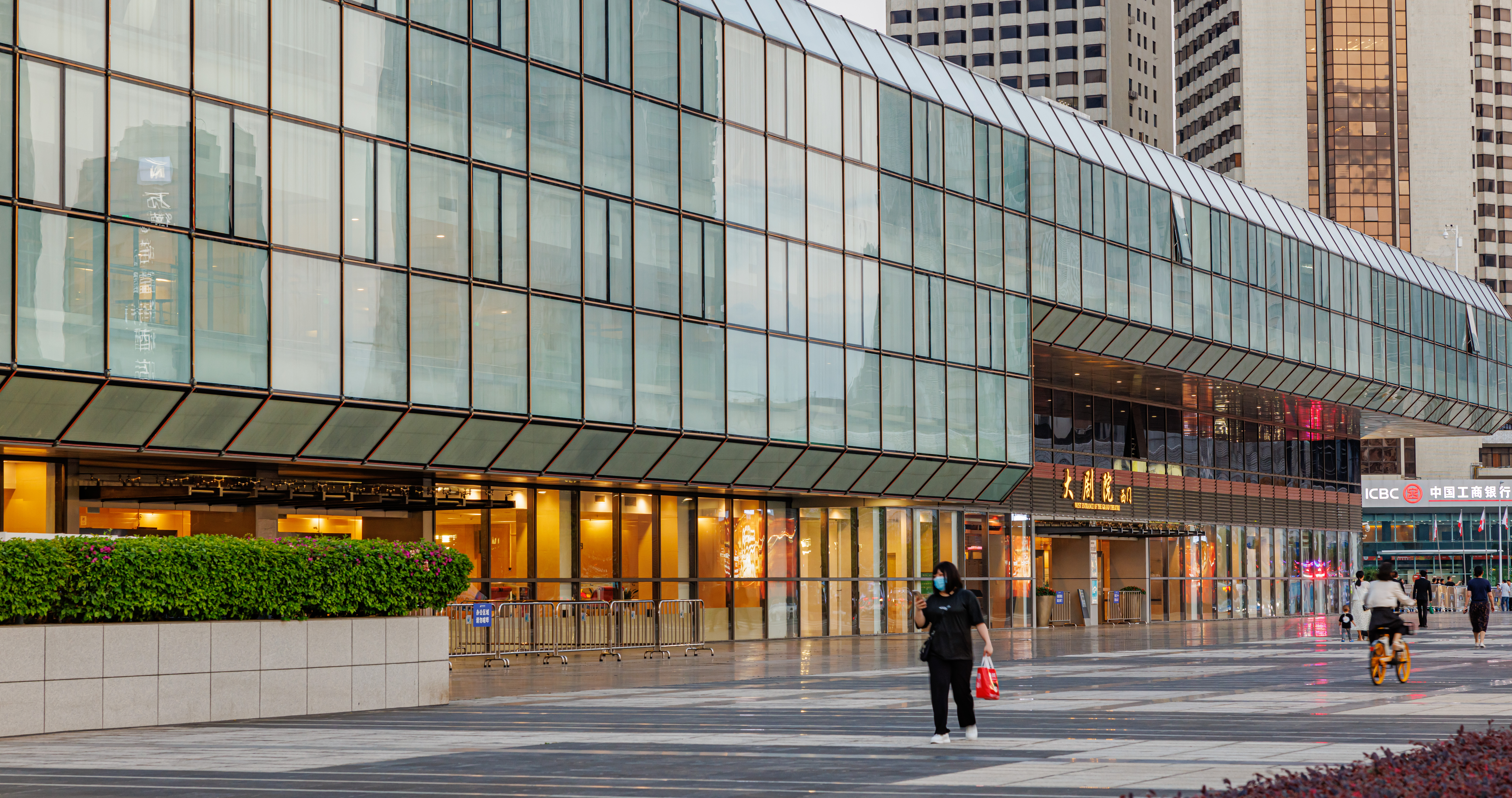
- Shenzhen Grand Theatre
- Interactive map of Shenzhen Grand Theater 深圳大剧院
- Address: No. 5018, Shennan East Road, Luohu District, Shenzhen, Guangdong Province

Construction
- Opened: May 1989

Website
- 深圳大剧院

Shenzhen Grand Theater (Chinese: 深圳大剧院) is a theater located in Luohu District, Shenzhen, Guangdong Province, at No. 5018 Shennan East Road. It was one of the "Eight Major Cultural Facilities" built by the government during the early establishment of the Shenzhen Special Economic Zone. Construction began in 1984, and it officially opened in 1989.

The theater covers an area of 43,700 square meters with a total floor space of 37,200 square meters. Its main hall has over 1,600 seats. The exterior features glass curtain walls with a folded cubic design, housing facilities such as a theater, concert hall, cultural exhibition space, restaurants, dance halls, and an underground commercial street.

== Transportation ==
- Grand Theater Station, Line 2, Shenzhen Metro
