= Cold War (2012 film) =

2012 Hong Kong film by Sunny Luk and Longman Leung

- Film poster

Chinese name
- Traditional Chinese: 寒戰
- Simplified Chinese: 寒战
Transcriptions
Standard Mandarin
- Hanyu Pinyin: Hán Zhàn
Yue: Cantonese
- Jyutping: Hon4 Zin3
- Directed by: Longman Leung; Sunny Luk
- Written by: Longman Leung; Sunny Luk
- Produced by: Bill Kong; Mathew Tang; Ivy Ho
- Starring: Aaron Kwok; Tony Leung; Charlie Young; Gordon Lam; Chin Kar-lok; Aarif Rahman; Eddie Peng; Andy Lau; Michael Wong; Terence Yin
- Cinematography: Jason Kwan (HKSC); Kenny Tse (HKSC)
- Edited by: Kwong Chi-leung (HKSC); Wong Hoi
- Music by: Peter Kam
- Production companies: Irresistible Delta Limited; Edko Films; Sil-Metropole Organisation
- Distributed by: Edko Films
- Release dates: 4 October 2012 (Busan); 8 November 2012 (Hong Kong)
- Running time: 102 minutes
- Country: Hong Kong
- Language: Cantonese
- Box office: HK$42,805,434

Cold War is a 2012 Hong Kong police procedural action thriller film directed by Longman Leung and Sunny Luk, starring Aaron Kwok and Tony Leung Ka-fai, and guest starring Andy Lau. Its title, Cold War (寒戰), is derived from the code name used in the police operation where the plot of the film evolves. The film was selected as the opening film at the 17th Busan International Film Festival and released in Hong Kong, Macau, and China on 8 November 2012.

Cold War won nine awards including Best Actor, Best Film, Best Director, and Best Screenplay at the 32nd Hong Kong Film Awards. The film has a sequel, known as Cold War 2 (2016), and will be followed up by two prequels, Cold War 1994 (2026) and Cold War 1995.

== Plot ==
One midnight in December 2015, (Note: Cold War 2 takes place in 2016, as its opening credits indicates the events of the Cold War operation happened "last December", which is set in 2015 instead of the original intended setting in 2011/2012.) a Hong Kong Police Force Emergency Unit (EU) van carrying advanced equipment and five police officers goes missing. As the police investigate the case, they became aware that the terrorists possess detailed knowledge of the police's procedures and have planned several steps ahead, even possibly breaching the secured police network. As Commissioner York Tsang is away, Deputy Commissioner M.B. Lee, plans and leads a rescue operation code-named "Cold War," and declares Hong Kong to go under a state of emergency.

After being repeatedly misled by the terrorists and failing to track them down, fellow Deputy Commissioner Sean Lau believes Lee is acting too rashly, due to one of the five abducted policemen being his own son, Joe Lee. After consulting with superintendent Vincent Tsui and Albert Kwong, who both believe Lee is taking measures too extreme, Lau relieves Lee of his post after an argument and assumes command of Operation Cold War, which Commissioner Tsang has approved Lau take charge of.

Lau plans to negotiate with the terrorists while secretly tracking them to their hide-out. The terrorists asks Lau to prepare a ransom equal to the calculated value of the policemen and the EU van. As the police force prepare the cash, the terrorists call again and say they only want roughly a third of the ransom, and for Lau to personally deliver the money. At the request of the bank manager, Lau takes only enough for the ransom and have the rest delivered back to the bank. When Lau eventually arrives at the meeting location, he is ordered to stop the car immediately and throw the cash down a bridge, causing a traffic blockage. In the confusion, Lau is attacked by the terrorists, and Tsui is killed in action in the crossfire. The terrorists escape, while Kwong notifies Lau that the terrorists simultaneously intercepted the rest of the money that was supposed to be returned to the bank. However, the police force successfully rescue the 5 missing policemen at a different location.

After Lau questions the bank manager about the return of the remainder of the ransom, the manager is killed by a car bomb after their meeting. Kwong investigates the bombing to track the terrorists, where they wipe out most of the SDU team. SDU commander Michael Shek betrays Kwong after he recognizes Chan Bun, a former undercover policeman, who recognizes Shek and Kwong as the latter led Kwong into a trap. Chan shoots both men after reminding how Shek sold him out, and blows up the rooftop before perishing in a huge explosion as well. Lau suspects that the terrorists were aided by insiders in the force, but before he can investigate any further, he is arrested by ICAC Officer Billy Cheung, who received leaked information from an anonymous source about Operation Cold War. Lau is interrogated by Cheung, who accuses him of poorly handling the rescue operation, leading to the loss of the ransom money which he secretly took for himself. Lau denies this, and the ICAC fails to find evidence against him. Cheung makes some further investigations and discovers that Commissioner Tsang will be stepping down in two years, and thus either Lee or Lau will receive a promotion. Lau has the support of the Security Secretary because of his skillful management of the police's finances, citing the method of "desperate times, desperate measures". On the other hand, Lee had risen through the ranks from Constable and with mass support of front-line officers including the CID. Cheung now suspects that Lee is trying to use the failure of Operation Cold War to ruin Lau's chance for promotion.

The ICAC eventually discover, based on forensic evidence, that Joe Lee was the mastermind behind the abduction of the EU van. Lau presents this information to Lee, and reveals that it was Lau himself that leaked information to the ICAC (who has the power to act independent to the police force), in order to borrow their resources to investigate the case, thus not alerting the insider. Lee confronts his son, who reveals that he planned this with other associates from the police force who wanted to see Lee rise to position of Commissioner and boosting morale within. Seeing that Joe is unrepentant and unwilling to reveal anymore, Lee reluctantly has him arrested while denouncing the latter as his son. The following day, Lee and Commissioner Tsang announce their plans for early retirement, nominating Lau as the next Commissioner. Lee congratulates Lau on his resourcefulness on solving the case despite lack of field experience.

The "Cold War" operation is deemed a successful failure, and the film ends with Lau receiving a mysterious phone call from the terrorists, who announces that they have kidnapped his wife, and want Joe Lee released in return.

== Cast ==
- Aaron Kwok as Sean K.F. Lau (劉傑輝), Deputy Commissioner of Police (Management)
- Tony Leung Ka-fai as Waise M.B. Lee (李文彬), Deputy Commissioner of Police (Operation), Acting Commissioner of Police during opening scene
- Andy Lau (guest star) as Philip M.W. Luk (陸明華), Security Bureau, Secretary for Security
- Charlie Yeung as Phoenix C.M. Leung (梁紫薇), Assistant Commissioner, Head of Police Public Relations Branch
- Gordon Lam as Albert C.L. Kwong (鄺智立), Senior Assistant Commissioner, Waise Lee's faction
- Chin Kar-lok as Vincent W.K. Tsui (徐永基), Senior Assistant Commissioner, Sean Lau's faction
- Andy On as Michael Shek, Chief Superintendent Special Duties Unit commander
- Terence Yin as Man To, Chief Superintendent, Director of Information Systems
- Grace Huang as May Cheung, Probationary Inspector, reporting to Sean Lau & Vincent Tsui
- Aarif Rahman as Billy K.B. Cheung (張國標), ICAC Principal Investigation Officer
- Jeannie Chan as Nicole Chan, ICAC Assistant Investigator
- Eddie Peng as Joe K.C. Lee (李家俊), Police Constable on EU 71, Waise Lee's only child
- Ma Yili as Sean Lau's wife
- J.J. Jia as Vincent W.K. Tsui's wife
- Alex Tsui Ka-kit as Matthew K.M. Mak, Deputy Commissioner (Operation) of ICAC
- Michael Wong as York H.W. Tsang, Commissioner of Police
- Tony Ho Wah-chiu as William Ngai, Chief Superintendent, Kowloon Bay New Treasury Building
- Joyce Cheng as M.Y. Shum, Sergeant, duty officer on EU 71
- Wai Kar-hung as Keung Wong, Police Constable, driver on EU 71
- Eric Li as T.M. Leung, Police Constable, communications on EU 71
- Gary Chan as K.F. Cheng, Police Constable on EU 71
- Byron Mann as Chan Bun, Lead Hijacker.

== Production ==
Production took place in Hong Kong from October to December 2011.

== Awards and nominations ==
Awards and nominations
Ceremony	Category	Recipient	Outcome
32nd Hong Kong Film Awards	Best Film	Cold War	Won
32nd Hong Kong Film Awards	Best Director	Sunny Luk, Longman Leung	Won
32nd Hong Kong Film Awards	Best Screenplay	Sunny Luk, Longman Leung	Won
32nd Hong Kong Film Awards	Best Actor	Tony Leung Ka-fai	Won
32nd Hong Kong Film Awards	Best Supporting Actor	Gordon Lam	Nominated
32nd Hong Kong Film Awards	Best New Performer	Alex Tsui Ka-kit	Won
32nd Hong Kong Film Awards	Best Cinematography	Jason Kwan, Kenny Tse	Nominated
32nd Hong Kong Film Awards	Best Editing	Kwong Chi-leung, Wong Hoi	Won
32nd Hong Kong Film Awards	Best Action Choreography	Chin Kar-lok, Wong Wai-fai	Nominated
32nd Hong Kong Film Awards	Best Sound Design	Kinson Tsang	Won
32nd Hong Kong Film Awards	Best Visual Effects	Cecil Cheng	Won
32nd Hong Kong Film Awards	Best Original Film Score	Peter Kam	Won
19th Hong Kong Film Critics Society Awards	Best Film	Cold War	Nominated
19th Hong Kong Film Critics Society Awards	Best Screenplay	Sunny Luk, Longman Leung	Nominated
19th Hong Kong Film Critics Society Awards	Best Actor	Tony Leung Ka-fai	Nominated

== Sequel and prequels ==
A sequel, titled Cold War 2, began production in September 2015, with original cast members Aaron Kwok, Tony Leung Ka-fai, Charlie Yeung, Aarif Rahman and Eddie Peng, and joined by new cast members Chow Yun-fat and Janice Man. Cold War 2 was released on 8 July 2016.

In 2024, Edko announced two prequels, Cold War 1994 and Cold War 1995, which began production that same year with Longman Leung returning as director and writer, whilst featuring a new cast including Terrance Lau, Daniel Wu and Wu Kang-ren. Cold War 1994 was released on 1 May 2026, while Cold War 1995 is expected to release later in 2026 or 2027.
