= God of Gamblers =

1989 Hong Kong film by Wong Jing

- Hong Kong film poster

Chinese name
- Traditional Chinese: 賭神
- Simplified Chinese: 赌神
Transcriptions
Standard Mandarin
- Hanyu Pinyin: Dǔ Shén
Yue: Cantonese
- Jyutping: Dou2 San4
- Directed by: Wong Jing
- Written by: Wong Jing
- Produced by: Jimmy Heung
- Starring: Chow Yun Fat; Andy Lau; Joey Wong; Sharla Cheung
- Cinematography: Peter Pau; David Chung
- Edited by: Choi Hung
- Music by: Lowell Lo; Sherman Chow
- Distributed by: Win's Movie Production & I/E Co. Ltd.
- Release date: 14 December 1989
- Running time: 126 minutes
- Country: Hong Kong
- Languages: Cantonese; English
- Box office: HK$37,058,686

God of Gamblers (Chinese: 賭神; lit. God of Gambling) is a 1989 Hong Kong action comedy film written and directed by Wong Jing. The film stars Chow Yun-fat, Andy Lau, Joey Wong, and Sharla Cheung. The film was released theatrically in Hong Kong on 14 December 1989.

== Plot ==
Ko Chun is a world-famous gambler, so renowned and talented at winning various games of chance that he is referred to as the "God of Gamblers". He keeps his identity secret from the public (and avoids photographs so he will not be recognised), but is known for three characteristics: his slicked-back hairstyle, his love of Feodora-brand chocolate, and his jade pinky ring.

Ko Chun arrives in Tokyo, accompanied by his girlfriend Janet and his assistant and cousin Ko Yee, for a match with Ueyama, the country's top ranked gambler. After convincingly defeating Ueyama in games of mahjong and dice, Ueyama concedes defeat and asserts that Ko Chun "really [is] God".

Ueyama asks Chun to help him take revenge on Chan Kam-sing aka the "Demon of Gamblers", a famous Singaporean gambler who cheated Ueyama's father before driving him to suicide, by besting Chan in a high-stakes poker match. Ko Chun agrees, merely asking for a box of chocolate as payment. In gratitude, Ueyama sends his bodyguard, former Army of the Republic of Vietnam Special Forces Operative, Dragon, to accompany Ko Chun for protection. Chun wins the game, but Chan sends a duo of thugs in retribution. Chun fights them off with Dragon's help.

Meanwhile, Little Knife, an avid but mediocre gambler who idolises the God of Gamblers, sets a trap for an Indian neighbour as a practical joke. After a fight on a train between Ko Chun, Dragon, and henchmen sent by one of Ko Chun's rivals, Ko happens to accidentally stumble into Knife's trap. Ko falls down a hill, hitting his head, and subsequently suffers from amnesia and regresses to a childlike state.

Knife, not knowing who the unnamed stranger is, takes him in and names him "Chocolate" due to the man's seemingly obsessive love for the candy. Initially Knife is impatient with Chocolate's childish innocence and often yells at him, but soon recognises that "Chocolate" has innate gambling talent and begins to exploit his abilities in local poker games and gambling dens. As time passes, Knife comes to care for Chocolate and seeks to find a way to restore his memory.

Back at Ko Chun's mansion, it is revealed that Janet has been searching for Chun for ten days to no avail. Ko Yee, who is jealous of Chun's success and wealth, makes advances on her, which she rejects; finally, while attempting to rape her, Yee accidentally knocks Janet off the balcony, killing her. He discovers that she has been recording what has been transpiring and proceeds to burn the tape. Later, Yee allies himself with Chan Kam-sing and Ko Chun's other rival and they send assassins to find and kill Chun.

Eventually, the assassins find Chun, Knife, and their friends and attempt to kill them, but Dragon arrives to protect them after tracking Chun down. A fierce shootout ensues in a shopping centre, in which Knife saves Chun from an attempt on his life by Ko Yee. During the fight, Dragon is wounded, causing Chun to snap out of his child persona briefly to kill the rest of the assailants. However, after regressing back to his childlike state, Chun becomes horrified at the carnage and runs out into the street where he is struck by a vehicle.

Chun awakens in the hospital with his regular persona, but no memory of the events or people he met after the fight. He is informed by Ko Yee, who is feigning loyalty, that Janet had killed herself. Knife arrives and attempts to warn Chun of Ko Yee's treachery but Yee has Knife thrown out. Later, Ko Yee gives Chan Kam-sing special eyeglasses that will allow him to cheat during his upcoming poker match with Chun by reading invisible markings on the cards.

Chun, Yee, Ueyama and Dragon arrive on Chan Kam-sing's yacht for the climactic game of five-card stud. Knife, having sneaked onto the boat, again attempts to warn Chun of the danger he is in. Chun agrees to hear Knife out later but admonishes him not to interfere with the poker game.

With his ability to see the markings on the cards, Chan Kam-Sing dominates the first two rounds. After losing all of Ueyama's money, Ko Chun puts up his entire personal portfolio of wealth and holdings against Chan's wealth. Chan, using his glasses to see that Ko Chun has an inferior hand, agrees, showing his cards and gloating over his victory. Ko Chun, in turn, reveals that he actually has the superior hand and has won the game, having secretly altered the markings of the deck and using special contact lenses to read them.

Subsequently, Ko Chun tricks Chan Kam-sing into shooting Ko Yee. As Yee lies dying, Chun drops Janet's tape (which actually never finished burning) onto his body. Ko Chun then departs (as police arrive to take Chan into custody for murder) without speaking to Knife, much to the latter's dismay.

Ko Chun later surprises Knife at his home and reveals that he remembered Knife in the hospital and knew about Ko Yee's betrayal all along, but had to feign ignorance to execute his plan properly. He promises to make it up to Knife by taking him to Las Vegas as his gambling partner.

== Cast ==
- Chow Yun-fat as (高進/賭神) Ko Chun / The God of Gamblers / Chocolate (nickname given to him when he loses his memory)
- Andy Lau as (陳刀仔) Michael Chan / Little Knife / Dagger
- Joey Wong as (珍) Jane / Jen
- Sharla Cheung as Janet
- Charles Heung as (龍五) Lung Ng/Dragon (once served in special force under Nguyễn Văn Thiệu)
- Ng Man-tat as (花柳成) Brother Shing
- Edison Lim as (林氏大賭徒) Biggest Gambler in Lim's Family
- Jimmy Lung Fong as (高義) Ko Yee
- Michiko Nishiwaki as (—菊子) Miss Chi, Ko Chun's female yakuza opponent
- Wong Jing as Whoremonger in love motel (cameo)
- Shing Fui-On as (大口九) Big Mouth
- Michael Chow as Casino manager
- Pau Hon-lam as (陳金城) Chan Kam-sing
- Dennis Chan as (黃美強醫生) Doctor Toneg Wong
- Chan Lap-ban as Michael's grandmother
- Law Ching-ho as Motel manager
- Yasuyoshi Shikamura as (上山宏次) Ueyama Koji
- Ronald Wong as (烏鴉) Crow
- Wong San as Jane's father
- Yeung Chak-lam as (南哥) Nam
- Seung-koon Yuk as Jane's mother

== Gamblers franchise ==
The success of the film spawned many sequels, spin-offs and parodies. The parody All for the Winner starring Stephen Chow led to two comedy-driven God of Gamblers sequels also starring Stephen Chow, followed by a more serious direct sequel with Chow Yun-fat reprising his role as Ko Chun.

God of Gamblers series:

- God of Gamblers (1989)
- All for the Winner (1990) – Stephen Chow is the Saint of Gamblers in this popular God of Gamblers parody.
- God of Gamblers II (1990) – This film continues where the original God of Gamblers storyline left off. This time, Andy Lau's character teams up with Stephen Chow's character from All for the Winner. Chow Yun-fat did not return for this film, but his God of Gambler character did show up for a brief cameo appearance using archive footage.
- God of Gamblers III: Back to Shanghai (1991) – A sequel to God of Gamblers II starring Stephen Chow. He accidentally goes back in time to Shanghai in 1937, and tries to figure out how to return to Hong Kong in 1991.
- God of Gamblers Returns (1994) – Also released under the name God of Gamblers 2 (but not God of Gamblers II) this is the 'true' sequel to the original God of Gamblers film, with Chow Yun-fat back to reprise his role as the God of Gamblers.
- God of Gamblers 3: The Early Stage (1997) – A successful prequel of the original God of Gamblers, starring Leon Lai as Ko Chun. It may be assumed that this is a reboot to the God of Gamblers series because of the inconsistencies with the previously established story of God of Gamblers e.g. Ko Chun and his bodyguard, meet for the very first time in the first film and therefore should not know each other in this prequel.
- From Vegas to Macau (2014) – This film once again stars Chow Yun-fat as a gifted gambler, though his character and the film's plot is unrelated to the God of Gamblers series. However, Chow (in a dual role) makes a cameo appearance as the original God of Gamblers, Ko Chun, at the end of the film. The film also ends with a remixed version of the original God of Gamblers theme music.
- From Vegas to Macau II (2015) – Chow Yun-fat returns as the gifted gambler, Ken. The film's plot is, again, unrelated to the God of Gamblers series. The film also ends with a remixed version of the original God of Gamblers theme music as Chow (in a dual role) makes a cameo appearance as the original God of Gamblers, Ko Chun at the end of the film. Andy Lau also makes a cameo appearance and reprises his role in the original God of Gamblers as Little Knife.
- From Vegas to Macau III (2016) - Chow returns as Ken as well as portraying the God of Gamblers and while Lau 's role as Little Knife is expanded as a main character from his cameo in the previous film.

Spin-offs:

- The Top Bet (1991) – This is a spin-off of All for the Winner, with only a few characters from the original reprising their role. Stephen Chow did, however, make a cameo appearance in this spin-off. The film stars Anita Mui and Carol Cheng.
- Fist of Fury 1991 (1991) – Stephen Chow's Saint of Gamblers character does a brief cameo appearance at the start of this film.
- Fist of Fury 1991 II (1992) – Sequel to the first movie. The plot continues where Fist of Fury 1991 ended.
- Saint of Gamblers (1995) – A spin-off of the All for the Winner series, with only Ng Man-tat reprising his role.
- My Wife is a Gambling Maestro (2008) – A parody of the first film directed by Wong Jing, but with a completely different cast and a romantic comedy plotline
- One More Chance (2023) - Known as Don't Call Me the "God of Gamblers" (別叫我"賭神") in Chinese. Chow plays Fai, a compulsive gambler and an irresponsible man who is asked to take care of his ex-girlfriend Chik's son, Yeung.

== See also ==
- Andy Lau filmography
- Chow Yun-fat filmography
- Lists of Hong Kong films
