= Tony Leung Ka-fai =

Hong Kong actor

- 梁家輝
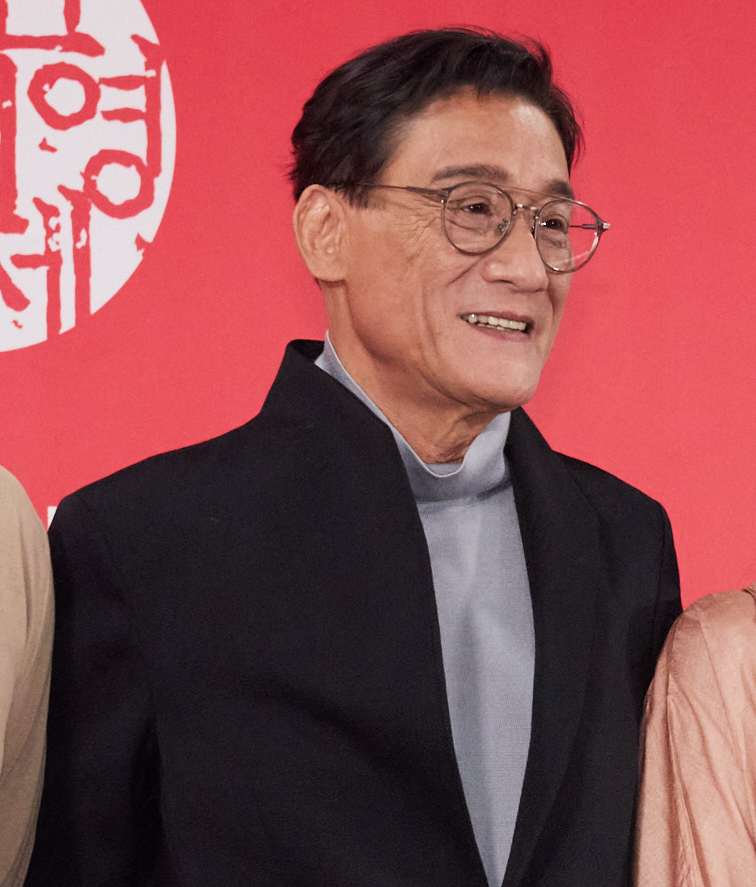
- Leung in 2025
- Born: Leung Ka-fai; 1 February 1958 (age 68); British Hong Kong
- Occupation: Actor
- Years active: 1983–present
- Spouse: Jiang Jianian (m. 1987)
- Awards: Hong Kong Film Awards – Best Actor; 1984 Reign Behind the Curtain; 1993 92 Legendary La Rose Noire; 2005 Election; 2012 Cold War; 2025 The Shadow's Edge; Best Supporting Actor; 2004 Men Suddenly in Black Hong Kong Film Critics Society Awards – Best Actor; 2005 Everlasting Regret; 2007 Eye in the Sky Golden Horse Awards – Best Actor; 1990 Farewell China; Best Supporting Actor; 2007 The Drummer Golden Rooster Awards – Best Actor; 2026 The Shadow's Edge

Chinese name
- Traditional Chinese: 梁家輝
- Simplified Chinese: 梁家辉
Transcriptions
Standard Mandarin
- Hanyu Pinyin: Liáng Jiāhuī
Yue: Cantonese
- Jyutping: Loeng4 Gaa1fai1

Tony Leung Ka-fai (simplified Chinese: 梁家辉; traditional Chinese: 梁家輝; born 1 February 1958) is a Hong Kong actor who is a five-time winner of the Hong Kong Film Award for Best Actor. In 2026, following his Best Actor win at the 39th Golden Rooster Awards, he became the second male actor to achieve the "Grand Slam", having won Best Actor at the three most prestigious Chinese-language film awards: the Golden Horse Awards, the Hong Kong Film Awards and the Golden Rooster Awards.

As he is often confused with actor Tony Leung Chiu-wai, Tony Leung Ka-fai is known as "Big Tony", while Tony Leung Chiu-wai is known as "Little Tony", nicknames which correspond to the actors' respective age and physical statures.

== Career ==
Leung has been in the film industry for more than 30 years, starring in a variety of roles. His debut film was Burning of the Imperial Palace (1983), where he played the Xianfeng Emperor. He would later work with Chow Yun-fat in three films, Prison on Fire (1987), A Better Tomorrow 3 (1989), and God of Gamblers Returns (1994). He also appeared as Joyce Godenzi's husband in She Shoots Straight, Joyce's trademark film.

In 1991, Leung went to France to appear in Jean-Jacques Annaud's The Lover, based on Marguerite Duras's novel, as the older lover of a young teen schoolgirl, who was played by British actress Jane March.

Leung was originally asked to portray the title character of The Last Emperor (1987) but declined due to prior commitments. The role later went to John Lone.

Leung went on to star in the international horror feature film Double Vision with American actor David Morse. His ongoing career has seen him star in films such as The Myth (2005), Everlasting Regret (2005) and Election (2005).

Leung won his fourth Best Actor award for his performance in Cold War at the 32nd Hong Kong Film Awards.

Leung most recently won Best Actor award for his villain role in The Shadow’s Edge at the 44th Hong Kong Film Awards.

He also starred in the music video of Mayday's song "Tough" in 2016.

In September 2025, Leung served as a member of the Competition Jury at the 30th Busan International Film Festival.

== Personal life ==
Tony Leung Ka-fai has twin daughters, Chloe and Nikkie, both of whom have married and recently given him grandchildren, making him a grandfather to a granddaughter from Chloe and a grandson from Nikkie, with both daughters choosing lives away from the spotlight despite their father's fame.

== Filmography ==
=== Film ===
Year	Title	Role	Notes/Ref.
1983	The Burning of Imperial Palace	Xianfeng Emperor	
1983	Reign Behind a Curtain	Xianfeng Emperor	Hong Kong Film Award for Best Actor; Nominated – Hong Kong Film Award for Best New Performer
1984	The Ghost Informer	Tang	
1984	Cherie	Hua	
1985	Journey of the Doomed		
1987	People's Hero	Captain Chan	
1987	Lady in Black	Chan Kin-sang	
1987	City Girl		
1987	Prison on Fire	Lo Ka-yiu / 51910	
1988	Gunmen	Captain Ting Kwan Pik	
1988	My Mother's Tea House		
1988	The Laser Man	Joey Cheung	
1989	Sentenced to Hang	Li Wai	
1989	Mr. Coconut		cameo
1989	A Better Tomorrow 3	Cheung Chi-mun	
1990	Island of Fire	Wei Wang / Andy	
1990	She Shoots Straight	Inspector Huang Tsung-pao	
1990	Queen's Bench III		
1990	Farewell China	Zhao Nansan	Nominated – Hong Kong Film Award for Best Actor; Golden Horse Award for Best Leading Actor
1991	Alien Wife		
1991	Inspector Pink Dragon	Ma Yau-yau	
1991	To Catch a Thief		
1991	Red and Black	Liang Kwo-tung	
1991	Her Fatal Ways	Wu Wei-kuo	
1991	This Thing Called Love		
1991	Au revoir mon amour	Liang Seng	
1991	The Raid	Masa	
1991	Blue Lightning	Ching Hay	
1991	King of Chess	Wong Yat-sang screenwriter	Nominated – Hong Kong Film Award for Best Actor
1991	The Banquet	Leung	
1991	Center Stage	Cai Chusheng	
1992	New Dragon Gate Inn	Chow Wai-on	
1992	Once Upon a Time a Hero in China	Bad Egg Ken Shek	
1992	92 Legendary La Rose Noire	Keith Lui	Hong Kong Film Award for Best Actor
1992	The Lover	Chinese Man	
1992	Misty		
1993	Boys Are Easy	Simon Tse Sai	
1993	Ghost Lantern	Fai	
1993	He Ain't Heavy, He's My Father	Tommy Chor Fan	
1993	Flying Dagger	Hon Chung	
1993	The Eagle Shooting Heroes	Duan Zhixing	
1993	Rose Rose I Love You	Keith Lui / Johnny	
1993	The Black Panther Warriors	Mang-po Fai	
1993	Tom, Dick and Hairy	Dick Ching	
1993	Finale in Blood	Fortune Teller	
1993	Lover of the Swindler	Michael Chan Chun	
1993	A Touch of Class	Lau Ching-man	
1993	Perfect Exchange	Chung Chor-hung	
1993	All Men Are Brothers: Blood of the Leopard	Lin Chong	
1994	To Live and Die in Tsimshatsui	Milky Fai	
1994	Always Be the Winners	Hui Man Lung	
1994	I Will Wait for You	So Yau-shing	
1994	The Long and Winding Road	James	
1994	He and She	Lai Chi-kai	
1994	God of Gamblers Returns	Siu Fong-fong / "Little Trumpet"	
1994	It's a Wonderful Life	Yum Kow-kwai	
1994	Ashes of Time	Huang Yaoshi	
1994	Lover's Lover		
1995	Dream Lover		
1995	The Winter of 1900		
1995	Lover of the Last Empress	Prince Kung	
1995	A Touch of Evil	Liang Shaolun	
1995	The Christ of Nanjing	Ryuichi Okagawa	
1996	Evening Liaison	Xu	
1997	Destination: 9th Heaven	Chiang Shan	
1997	Island of Greed	Chao Chiu-sen	Nominated – Hong Kong Film Award for Best Actor
1999	Love Will Tear Us Apart	Jian producer	
1999	Victim	Pit	
2000	Okinawa Rendez-vous	Law Wan-dat	
2000	Jiang hu: The Triad Zone	Jimmy Yam	Nominated – Hong Kong Film Award for Best Actor
2001	The Treatment	Xu Datong	
2002	Double Vision	Huang Huo-tu	Nominated – Hong Kong Film Award for Best Actor
2002	Zhou Yu's Train	Chen Qing	
2002	Golden Chicken	Professor Chan	
2003	Good Times, Bed Times		
2003	Men Suddenly in Black	Ninth uncle	Hong Kong Film Award for Best Supporting Actor
2003	The Spy Dad	Jones Bon	
2004	20 30 40	Zhang Shijie "Jerry"	
2004	Sex and the Beauties	Dick Yan	
2004	PaPa Loves You	Yam Mo-ying	
2004	Fear of Intimacy	Fai	
2004	Throw Down	Lee Kong	
2004	The Twins Effect II	Master Blackwood	
2004	Three... Extremes	Lee	
2004	Dumplings	Mr. Li	Nominated – Hong Kong Film Award for Best Supporting Actor
2004	A-1 Headline	Chief Editor Terrence Tsang Tat-si	
2005	On the Mountain of Tai Hang	He Bingyan	
2005	The Myth	William	
2005	Election	Big D	Hong Kong Film Award for Best Actor
2005	Everlasting Regret	Mr. Cheng	Nominated – Hong Kong Film Award for Best Actor
2006	My Name Is Fame	Himself	
2007	Eye in the Sky	Chan Chong-shan	
2007	It's a Wonderful Life	But Sau-kong (Stainless Steel)	
2007	Lost in Beijing	Lin Dong	
2007	The Drummer	Kwan	
2008	A Chinese Fairy Tale		
2008	Missing	Dr. Edward Tong	
2008	Iron Road	Book Man	Two-part miniseries
2009	I Corrupt All Cops	Chief inspector Lak Chui	
2009	Bodyguards and Assassins	Chen Shaobai	
2009	The Founding of a Republic	CPPCC member	
2010	Detective Dee and the Mystery of the Phantom Flame	Shatuo Zhong	Nominated – Hong Kong Film Award for Best Supporting Actor
2010	Energy Behind the Heart		
2010	Bruce Lee, My Brother	Lee Hoi-chuen	Nominated – Hong Kong Film Award for Best Actor
2010	Kiss, His First		
2011	I Love Hong Kong	Ng Shun	
2011	Cold Steel		
2011	The Devil Inside Me	Jiang Mu	
2012	Cold War	Waise M.B. Lee	Hong Kong Film Award for Best Actor
2012	Tai Chi 0	Chen Changxing	
2012	Tai Chi Hero	Chen Changxing	
2013	Better and Better	Chef Zhou	
2013	Tales from the Dark 1	Ho Ho	
2014	Golden Chicken 3	Professor Chan	Cameo
2014	Beijing Love Story	Liu Hui	
2014	Horseplay	Lee Tan, the Nine-Tailed Fox	
2014	Rise of the Legend	Wong Kei-ying	Cameo
2014	The Taking of Tiger Mountain	Hawk	Nominated – Hong Kong Film Award for Best Actor
2014	Who is Undercover	Wang Feng	
2015	Lost and Love	Jiangxi traffic cop	Cameo
2016	Lost in White	Zhou Peng	
2016	Cold War 2	Waise Lee	
2016	League of Gods	King Zhou of Shang	
2017	Our Time Will Come	Zheng Jiabin	Nominated – Golden Horse Award for Best Supporting Actor
2018	Asura	Asura King, Head of Desire	
2019	Midnight Diner	Uncle	Directorial debut
2019	Chasing the Dragon II: Wild Wild Bunch	Logan Lung	
2021	Once Upon a Time in Hong Kong	Crippled Ho	
2021	All U Need Is Love	Yam Yan-kau	
2025	Legends of the Condor Heroes: The Gallants	Ouyang Feng	
2025	Sons of the Neon Night	Psychologist	
2025	The Shadow's Edge	Fu Lung-sang	Hong Kong Film Award for Best Actor; Golden Rooster Award for Best Actor; Nominated – Hundred Flowers Award for Best Actor
2026	Cold War 1994	M.B. Lee	
2026	V	Chan Fai-yin	
TBA	Return of the Lucky Stars		
