= Edko Films =

Hong Kong film studio

Edko Films Ltd.
- Industry: Film
- Founded: 1986
- Headquarters: Mid-level, Macdonnell Rd, 21-2 12 Wan Building, Hong Kong
- Key people: William Kong (executive director)
- Services: Film production, film distribution

Edko Films
- Traditional Chinese: 安樂影片有限公司
- Simplified Chinese: 安乐影片有限公司
Transcriptions
Yue: Cantonese
- Jyutping: Ngon1 Lok6 Jing2 Pin2 Jau2 Haan6 Gung1 Si1

Edko Films Ltd. (Chinese: 安樂影片有限公司) is a Hong Kong film production company and distributor.

== History ==
Edko Films was founded in 1959 by Kong Cho-yee. In 1989, his son William Kong took the business over. In 1996, Edko opened the Broadway Cinematheque, a theatre specializing in showing art films.

== Filmography ==
Title	Release date	Box office gross	Ref.
The Mummy: Tomb of the Dragon Emperor	September 2, 2008	$403.4 million USD	
The Warrior and the Wolf	October 2, 2009	CN¥11 million	
True Legend	February 9, 2010	CN¥49 million	
Ocean Heaven	June 18, 2010	CN¥14 million	
Together	December 1, 2010	CN¥0.6 million	
Lover's Discourse	December 31, 2010	CN¥4 million	
Love for Life	May 10, 2011	CN¥58 million	
Kora	November 3, 2011	CN¥4 million	
Nightfall	March 15, 2012	CN¥48 million	
First Time	June 8, 2012	CN¥36 million	
Cold War	November 8, 2012	CN¥253 million	
Finding Mr. Right	March 21, 2013	CN¥520 million	
Singing When We Are Young	July 7, 2013	CN¥2 million	
Firestorm	December 12, 2013	CN¥308 million	
Up in the Wind	December 31, 2013	CN¥80 million	
Coming Home	May 16, 2014	CN¥291 million	
Temporary Family	August 21, 2014	CN¥101 million	
Rise of the Legend	November 21, 2014	CN¥184 million	
Red Amnesia	April 30, 2015	CN¥10 million	
Monster Hunt	July 16, 2015	CN¥2,440 million	
Go Away Mr. Tumor	August 13, 2015	CN¥511 million	
Everybody's Fine	January 1, 2016	CN¥26 million	
The Bodyguard	April 1, 2016	CN¥324 million	
Book of Love	April 29, 2016	CN¥787 million	
Cold War 2	July 8, 2016	CN¥678 million	
Cherry Returns	December 30, 2016	CN¥33 million	
Full River Red	January 22, 2023	$662.5 million USD	
The Furious	May 14, 2026	TBA	
