= Language coaching =

Term in language teaching

From the beginning of the twenty first century, the term language coaching has become increasingly used in the field of language teaching and language learning. Language coaching supports the acquisition of foreign languages but incorporates principles, models and competencies from the field of coaching. These may originate from coaching organisations such as the International Coach Federation or from particular coaching models such as GROW which range from the more directive as in mentoring relationships, or non-directive as in life coaching, or performance-based as in coaching to build specific competence such as for sport, public speaking, or business acumen.

Language coaches are sought by higher-level, more advanced language learners who feel they have ceased benefiting from language teaching and are ready and able to take control of their development autonomously. Language coaching therefore has a strong emphasis on metacognitive practice. Metacognition is also valuable to language learners but it is definitive and fundamental to coaching, encompassing, for example, strategy and goal setting, action planning, and goal review. Language coaching typically supports coachees to refine second-language communicative proficiency for workplace performance. Some language coaches are sought for document review and copyediting.

The development of language coaching for more advanced users of a language has risen in this globalised world where bilingualism is more common, language acquisition is strongly supported by technology, and the need for a traditional teacher is redundant. Language coaches should be qualified as language teachers or with similar pedagogical credentials.
