= List of Hong Kong films of 2015 =

This article lists feature-length Hong Kong films released in 2015.

== Box office ==
The highest-grossing Hong Kong films released in 2015 by domestic box office gross revenue, are as follows:

Highest-grossing films released in 2015
Rank	Title	Domestic gross
1	Ip Man 3	HK$60,422,830
2	Little Big Master	HK$46,729,492
3	From Vegas to Macau II	HK$28,407,293
4	12 Golden Ducks	HK$24,304,550
5	Triumph in the Skies	HK$21,634,135
6	Anniversary	HK$19,644,128
7	Keeper of Darkness	HK$17,504,083
8	Sara	HK$17,436,137
9	Helios	HK$16,157,266
10	SPL II: A Time for Consequences	HK$13,542,522

== Releases ==
Title	Director	Cast	Genre	Notes
12 Golden Ducks	Matt Chow	Sandra Ng, Louis Koo, Nicholas Tse, Simon Yam, Joey Yung, Chrissie Chau, Anthony Wong, Zhao Wei	Comedy	In theaters 19 February 2015
All You Need Is Love	Richie Jen	Richie Jen, Shu Qi	Romantic comedy	In theaters 10 September 2015
An Inspector Calls	Raymond Wong	Louis Koo, Eric Tsang, Teresa Mo, Hans Zhang, Gordon Lam, Chrissie Chau, Karena Ng, Liu Yan, Raymond Wong	Comedy	In theaters 19 February 2015
Angel Whispers	Carrie Ng; Shirley Yung	Carrie Ng, Kabby Hui, Sammy Hung, Chu Lai-ling, Leanne Fu, Kwok Yick-ling	Horror	In theaters 16 April 2015
Anniversary	Patrick Kong	Stephy Tang, Alex Fong, Loletta Lee, David Siu, Louis Cheung	Romance / drama	In theaters 31 December 2015
Are You Here	Jill Wong	Jacqueline Chong, Sammy Sum, Alan Luk, Jumbo Tsang, Paw Hee-ching, Law Lan, Siu Yam-yam, Don Li, Vivian Chan, Aka Chio, Eddie Law, Monie Tung, Angela Yuen	Horror	In theaters 29 October 2015
Big Fortune Hotel	Stephan Yip	Pakho Chau, Shiga Lin, Law Lan, Lo Hoi-pang, Wilson Tsui, Alan Wan, Tyson Chak, Ran Ran, Steve Yap	Horror / comedy	In theaters 5 November 2015
Daughter	Chan Pang-chun	Kara Hui, Yanny Chan, Kenny Wong, Fung Bo Bo	Horror	In theaters 19 November 2015
Dragon Blade	Daniel Lee	Jackie Chan, John Cusack, Adrien Brody, Lin Peng, Mika Wang, Choi Siwon	Action	In theaters 12 March 2015
From Vegas to Macau II	Wong Jing	Chow Yun-fat, Nick Cheung, Carina Lau, Shawn Yue, Angela Wang, Michelle Hu, David Chiang, Kimmy Tong	Comedy	In theaters 19 February 2015
Full Strike	Derek Kwok	Josie Ho, Ekin Cheng, Ronald Cheng, Tse Kwan-ho, Edmond Leung, Wilfred Lau, Siu Yam-yam, Andrew Lam, Wang Lin, Bao Chunlai	Sports / comedy	In theaters 7 May 2015
Get Outta Here	Nick Leung	Alex Lam, J. Arie, Louis Cheung, Ng Yuen-yee, Gregory Charles Rivers, Michelle Loo	Horror / comedy	In theaters 8 October 2015
The Gigolo	Au Cheuk-man	Dominic Ho, Candy Yuen, Jeana Ho, Hazel Tong, Winnie Leung	Erotic / drama	In theaters 29 January 2015
Guia in Love	Sam Leong	Stephy Tang, Wong You-nam, Annie Liu, Wilfred Lau, Babyjohn Choi, Vivian Chan, Fiona Sit, Fabien Yang, Terence Siufay, Joyce Cheng, Wilson Lam, Wan Yeung-ming	Romance	In theaters 17 September 2015
Guilty	Jill Wong	Pakho Chau, Liddy Li, Wilson Tsui, Chow Tsz-lung	Mystery / thriller	In theaters 12 March 2015
Helios	Sunny Luk; Longman Leung	Jacky Cheung, Nick Cheung, Shawn Yue, Ji Jin-hee, Choi Si-won, Janice Man, Wang Xueqi, Chang Chen	Crime / thriller	In theaters 1 May 2015
Hill of Ilha Verde	Cheung King-wai	Devana Ng, Lam Wai-tung, Leong Wai-kun, Leong Cheok-mei	Short film	Entered into the 2014 Hong Kong Asian Film Festival; In theaters 22 August 2015
Imprisoned: Survival Guide for Rich and Prodigal	Christopher Sun	Gregory Wong, Justin Cheung, Tommy Wong, Liu Kai-chi, Babyjohn Choi, Jessy Li, Candice Yu, Elvis Tsui, Ken Lo, Philip Keung, Lam Suet, Wan Yeung-ming, Deon Cheung, Hanjin Tan, Anita Chui, Coffee Lam, Aaron Chow, Jack Hui, Raymond Chiu, Yang Jianping, Tony Ho, Frankie Ng, Yuen Qiu, William Ho, Joyce Cheng	Comedy	In theaters 28 May 2015
Insanity	David Lee	Sean Lau, Huang Xiaoming, Alex Fong, Fiona Sit, Paw Hee-ching, Michelle Ye, Xian Seli, Fedic Mao, Michelle Wai, Alien Sun	Drama / thriller	In theaters 2 April 2015
Ip Man 3	Wilson Yip	Donnie Yen, Zhang Jin, Lynn Hung, Patrick Tam, Karena Ng, Kent Cheng, Bryan Leung, Louis Cheung, Danny Chan, Babyjohn Choi, Mike Tyson	Martial arts	In theaters 24 December 2015
Keeper of Darkness	Nick Cheung	Nick Cheung, Amber Kuo, Sisley Choi, Louis Cheung, Philip Keung, Karena Lam	Horror	Entered into the 2015 Hong Kong Asian Film Festival; In theaters 26 November 2015
Knock Knock Who’s There?	Carrie Ng	Annie Liu, Babyjohn Choi, Kate Tsui, Jennifer Tse, Eric Kwok	Horror	In theaters 27 August 2015
Lazy Hazy Crazy	Luk Yee-sum	Ashina Kwok, Fish Liew, Koyi Mak, Gregory Wong, Sola Aoi, Chui Tien-you, Siu Yam-yam	Drama / erotic	Entered into the 2015 Tokyo International Film Festival; In theaters 29 October 2015
Little Big Master	Adrian Kwan	Miriam Yeung, Louis Koo, Stanley Fung, Richard Ng, Philip Keung	Drama	In theaters 19 March 2015
Lost and Love	Peng Sanyuan	Andy Lau	Road drama	In theaters 26 March 2015
Love Detective	Jill Wong	Ivana Wong, Pakho Chau, Ram Chiang, Shiga Lin, Jacquelin Chong, Anjaylia Chan, Bob Lam, Joe Tay, Heidi Lee, Justin Cheung	Action / comedy	In theaters 3 September 2015
Lucky Star 2015	Sunny	Eric Tsang, Wong Cho-lam, Ella Chen, Dada Chan, Wan Chiu	Comedy	In theaters 5 March 2015
The Merger	Jimmy Luk	Frankie Lam, Patrick Tam, Rachel Lam, Kathy Yuen, Charles Ying, Pinky Cheung, Wong Mei-kei, Wilson Tsui, Kwok Fung	Romance / drama	In theaters 17 September 2015
Murmur of the Hearts	Sylvia Chang	Joseph Chang, Isabella Leong, Lawrence Ko, Angelica Lee	Drama	Entered into the 2015 Hong Kong International Film Festival; In theaters 23 March 2015
Office	Johnnie To	Chow Yun-fat, Sylvia Chang, Eason Chan, Tang Wei	Drama	In theaters 24 September 2015
One Night in Taipei	Wilson Chin	Kelvin Kwan, Sharon Hsu, One Two Three, Luk Wing-kuen, Ili Cheng, Mandy Tao, Riva Chang, Sophia Wang, Barbie Liu, King Kong Lee, Yako Chan	Blue comedy	In theaters 19 March 2015
Paris Holiday	James Yuen	Louis Koo, Amber Kuo, Janice Man	Romantic comedy	In theaters 23 July 2015
Port of Call	Philip Yung	Aaron Kwok, Elaine Jin, Patrick Tam, Maggie Shiu	Thriller	In theaters 3 December 2015
Return of the Cuckoo	Patrick Kong	Julian Cheung, Charmaine Sheh, Joe Chen, Nancy Sit, Kwok Fung	Drama	In theaters 12 November 2015
S for Sex, S for Secret	Jill Wong	Annie Liu, Pakho Chau, Jacquelin Chong, Jeana Ho, Kabby Hui, Philip Keung, Edward Ma, Bryant Mak, Bob Lam, Elva Ni, Winki Lai, Jessica Cambensy	Romance	In theaters 15 January 2015
Sara	Herman Yau	Charlene Choi, Simon Yam, Alien Sun, Ryan Lau, Tony Ho	Physiological thriller	In theaters 5 March 2015.
She Remembers, He Forgets	Adam Wong	Miriam Yeung, Jan Lamb, Neo Yau, Cecilia So	Romance	Entered into the 2015 Hong Kong Asian Film Festival; In theaters 5 November 2015
SPL II: A Time for Consequences	Cheang Pou-soi	Tony Jaa, Louis Koo, Simon Yam, Wu Jing, Zhang Jin	Martial arts	In theaters 18 June 2015
Super Models		Pakho Chau, Wylie Chiu, JJ Jia, Natalis Chan, Law Kar-ying, Charlie Cho, Renee Dai, Amy K, Melody Chan, Monie Tung, Ken Wong, Stephen Wong Ka-lok, Samuel Leung	Drama / erotic	In theaters 22 October 2015
Ten Years	Ng Ka-leung, Jevons Au, Chow Kwun-Wai, Fei-pang Wong, Kwok Zune	Liu Kai-chi		In theaters 17 December 2015
To the Fore	Dante Lam	Peng Yuyan, Choi Siwon, Shawn Dou, Wang Luodan, Nana Ouyang, Carlos Chan, Andrew Lin	Sports / romance	In theaters 6 August 2015
Triumph in the Skies	Wilson Yip; Matt Chow	Louis Koo, Francis Ng, Julian Cheung, Sammi Cheng, Charmaine Sheh, Amber Kuo, Elena Kong, Océane Zhu, Jun Kung	Drama / romance	In theaters 19 February 2015
Two Thumbs Up	Lau Ho-leung	Simon Yam, Francis Ng, Patrick Tam, Leo Ku, Mark Cheng, Christie Chen, Philip Keung	Action / crime / comedy	In theaters 2 April 2015
Undercover Duet	Mark Wu	Ronald Cheng, Mark Wu, Ava Yu	Comedy	In theaters 27 August 2015
Utopians	Danny Cheng Wan-Cheung ('Scud')	Adonis He Fei, Jackie Chow, Ching-Man Chin, Fiona Wang	Drama	Entered into the 2015 New Directors' Festival; In theaters September 2016
The Vanished Murderer	Law Chi-leung	Sean Lau, Gordon Lam, Li Xiaolu, Jiang Yiyan, Rhydian Vaughan	Crime / thriller	In theaters 3 December 2015
Wild City	Ringo Lam	Louis Koo, Shawn Yue, Tong Liya, Joseph Chang	Action	In theaters 20 August 2015
Wonder Mama	Clifton Ko	Fung Bo Bo, Babyjohn Choi, Kenneth Tsang, Siu Yam-yam	Drama	Entered into the 2014 Taipei Golden Horse Film Festival; In theaters 4 June 2015
Wong Ka Yan	Benny Lau	Wong You-nam, Karena Ng, Prudence Liew, Gigi Leung, Hacken Lee, Tyson Chak	Romance / drama	Entered into the 2015 Singapore Chinese Film Festival; In theaters 22 October 2015

== See also ==
- 2015 in Hong Kong
