= Murder of Wong Ka-mui =

2008 murder of a teenage girl in Hong Kong

Wong Ka-mui
- Wong Ka-mui, who was strangled to death before the dismemberment of her body
- Born: Wong Ka-mui c. 1991; Hunan, People's Republic of China
- Died: 27 April 2008 (aged 16); Shek Kip Mei, Sham Shui Po, Hong Kong
- Cause of death: Strangulation
- Other names: Kiki Wong; Wang Jiamei
- Education: Tai Po Sam Yuk Secondary School (dropout)
- Occupations: Student (former); Prostitute
- Known for: Victim of a murder-dismemberment case
- Parent(s): Unnamed mother Unnamed stepfather
- Family: One sister

On 27 April 2008, at Shek Kip Mei, Sham Shui Po, Hong Kong, 16-year-old sex worker Wong Ka-mui (王嘉梅 Wáng Jīaméi), alias Kiki Wong, was murdered by strangulation after being raped by her 24-year-old male client Ting Kai-tai (丁启泰 ding1kai2taai3), who butchered her body into bits and pieces before flushing most of the body parts down the toilet and throwing her severed head and organs into the sea. Ting was arrested days after the murder and for the charges of preventing the lawful burial of a body and first-degree murder, Ting was found guilty and sentenced to life imprisonment in 2009.

== Background ==
=== Wong Ka-mui ===
Wong Ka-mui, alias Kiki Wong, was born in 1991 in Hunan, and had an older sister. After her divorce, Wong's mother remarried in 1994 to a Hongkonger. Wong immigrated to Hong Kong in 2005, and settled in Tai Po, where she attended school at Tai Po Sam Yuk Secondary School. Wong was academically inclined but reportedly had difficulty socialising with people in school due to her not being a local and lacking a Hong Kong accent.

Due to her family's poverty and need to pay off her debt of HK$50,000, Wong chose to drop out during her third year of secondary school in January 2008, and made a living by finding odd jobs. Wong reportedly joined a compensated dating network, which was a sex worker social network where young prostitutes would provide their services to older clients. Wong also harboured hopes and dreams of becoming a famous model in midst of making a living by prostitution.

=== Ting Kai-tai ===
Ting Kai-tai, nicknamed "Fatty Ting", was born in British Hong Kong in 1984. At the age of five, Ting lost his mother to a car accident, and during the same car crash, Ting sustained a severe head injury. Since then, he has had emotional problems. When he was eight years old, Ting was sent to a psychiatric hospital, where he was diagnosed with attention deficit hyperactivity disorder (ADHD), and he dropped out of school when he was in the first grade of secondary school. Ting's father later remarried, and Ting's stepmother reportedly treated Ting well. Many friends of Ting noted he had a weird temper, as he would sometimes fly into a rage and out of control at certain moments or when things did not go his way.

Ting had several run-ins with the law since youth. He was sentenced to a boy's home for one year for hurting someone when he was 15. Ting also began consuming drugs at this point of time and had hired prostitutes by age 16. Ting would later work as an apprentice in air-conditioning engineering, and later became a transportation worker by 2008.

== Wong's disappearance and murder ==
In mid-April 2008, Wong Ka-mui was contacted by Ting Kai-tai via an online compensated-dating forum posting. Ting paid Wong for dating and sexual services.

On 27 April 2008, Ting went to a shopping mall's nightclub, where he consumed alcohol, ketamine, and ecstasy pills. When Ting returned home in the morning, he contacted Wong and paid her HK$1,500 to have sex. The two met for lunch and then returned to the Ting's Shek Kip Mei apartment in Sham Shui Po. There, they listened to music and consumed drugs together. Between 1 pm and 3 pm, Ting strangled Wong to death. Ting would state that he did not remember strangling her due to the effects of the drugs, and that Wong had told him that she wanted to die. He went on to state that upon waking, he could not clearly remember what happened, but realised he had killed Wong. He then decided to dispose of the corpse by dismembering it.

For the next six hours, Ting chopped up the body of Wong inside the bathroom, separating the head and limb by limb. Ting proceeded to cut up the severed limbs and torso into small bits and pieces of flesh and bone. Ting gathered up most of the flesh pieces from Wong's corpse and flushed them down from the toilet, and also kept the severed head and organs into a plastic bag, which he threw into the sea after reaching the Kowloon City Ferry Pier by bus. As for the bone pieces and some last bits of Wong's flesh, Ting sneaked into Shek Kip Mei Wet Market, where he threw the bone pieces and flesh into baskets of pork bones at a pork-seller's stall. He disposed of Wong's handbag and mobile phone but stole HK$3,400 in cash from Wong's wallet and used up the money for sex, drinks and drugs over the next nine days. Wong was only reported missing on 29 April 2008 after her family got wind of her disappearance.

During the dismemberment, Ting had made three separate phone calls to his friend Tse Yin-tak (谢彦德 Xiè Yàndé), telling him about the murder of Wong and how he chopped up the body into pieces. Although Tse did not take it seriously and thought Ting was playing a bad joke with him, he later found it unsettling after coming across with the news of Wong's disappearance, given that the circumstances of her case seemed to add up with what Ting told him. Tse later made a police report and told them about what Ting said to him. Coupled with phone records that linked Ting as the last person to contact Wong, the Hong Kong Police Force's investigating officers arrested Ting as a suspect. Tse was awarded by the police for his direct role in capturing Ting for Wong's killing.

On 9 May 2008, Ting was charged with murder after the authorities obtained his confession, although no plea was taken from him. Recovery efforts by the police managed to yield several pieces of Wong's flesh from the nearby pipes of Ting's residence but the severed head of Wong was never found till today. The authorities also speculated that the bits of bone and flesh thrown by Ting at the market were likely disposed of with the disposable meat that butchers threw, but it was also possible for them to be turned into cooking fats and oils per the practice of butchers who put the disposable meat to such use. The recovered body pieces of Wong were later sent for DNA testing, and it was confirmed that these bits of human flesh belonged to Wong.

== Trial of Ting Kai-tai ==
Ting Kai-tai
- Born: 1984 (age 41–42); British Hong Kong
- Other name: Fatty Ting
- Status: Incarcerated
- Convictions: Murder; Preventing lawful burial of corpse
- Penalty: Life imprisonment (murder; concurrent); Four years' imprisonment (Preventing lawful burial of corpse; concurrent)

Details
- Victims: Wong Ka-mui (deceased)
- Date: 27 April 2008
- Country: China
- State: Hong Kong
- Date apprehended: 29 April 2008

Ting Kai-tai's trial for the murder of Wong Ka-mui was conducted a year after his capture, in July 2009. Ting claimed trial to one count of first-degree murder and one count of preventing the lawful burial of a body at the Hong Kong High Court, with both a single judge and a seven-member jury presiding over his murder trial.

In court, it was undisputed that Ting had murdered Wong based on his harrowing confession as presented in a videotape in court, and Ting himself also admitted to his self-feelings of horror as he recounted the horrific details of murdering and dismembering Wong. The only defence which Ting deployed was diminished responsibility, as Ting claimed that he was suffering from impaired mental responsibility due to drug intoxication at the time of the offence, as a result of drug abuse prior to the murder. Ting also claimed that he could not recall how he killed Wong or dispose of the body, and denied that he was acting when he cried as he thought about the victim's family. However, his defence was not accepted as the prosecution pointed out that Ting was capable of fully recalling every details of his crime when he first made the confession and that he failed to mention from the start to the police that he was under the influence of drugs, a fact he only brought up during his trial, when he killed Wong.

On 27 July 2009, a jury of seven people, consisting of three women and four men, deliberated for nearly three hours before they returned with a verdict, unanimously finding 25-year-old Ting Kai-tai guilty of both counts. Justice Alan Wright convicted Ting as charged in accordance to the jury's guilty verdict, and for the charge of preventing the lawful burial of the body, Justice Wright sentenced Ting to four years' imprisonment. However, for the other charge of first-degree murder, Ting was given a mandatory life sentence with pursuant to Hong Kong law, which mandated life imprisonment as the sole permissible punishment for murder. Justice Wright, who admonished Ting for the "barbaric" murder of Wong during sentencing, additionally ordered Ting to serve both jail terms concurrently.

At the time of Ting's sentencing, there was no death penalty for murder in Hong Kong, as in 1993, capital punishment was fully abolished by the former British colonial government of Hong Kong before its 1997 handover to the People's Republic of China (or mainland China), and despite the continued regular use of capital punishment by the PRC, the post-1997 Hong Kong government continued to outlaw the practice of capital punishment under the principle of independence of legal system in the Hong Kong Basic Law. When asked about his friend's trial outcome, Tse Yin-tak commented that he still considered Ting as a friend even after he turned him in to the police.

== Ting's appeal and imprisonment ==
After his sentencing, Ting Kai-tai filed an appeal against his conviction and sentence. On 4 December 2012, the Hong Kong Court of Appeal dismissed Ting's appeal and affirmed both his sentence and conviction for murdering Wong Ka-mui.

In 2011, while he was incarcerated at Stanley Prison, Ting and three other prisoners were allegedly involved in the group assault of a newcomer prisoner, a convicted rapist who raped his three daughters, over a failed extortion bid. It was not known if Ting was convicted after being brought to court for this prison incident.

Since the end of his sentencing in 2009, Ting remains in Stanley Prison serving his life sentence.

== Societal response ==
When the dismemberment of Wong Ka-mui first came to light, many residents of Hong Kong were shocked and outraged to hear about the brutality of Wong's murder and the dismemberment of the corpse. Some residents also feared that they might have accidentally consumed some of the flesh that came from Wong's dismembered body parts, given that Wong had admitted to disposing of some pieces of Wong's flesh and bones at a butcher's stall, and it also repulsed the butchers of the wet market.

Wong's death also brought attention to the phenomenon of compensated dating, as there were many more underage girls who resorted to prostitution through this scheme. The authorities also issued warnings to teenagers that anyone with any involvement in compensated dating would face the full brunt of the law.

The murder of Wong Ka-mui was remembered as one of Hong Kong's most gruesome murders to date, in addition to the Hello Kitty murder case, the murder of Glory Chau and Moon Siu, the murder of Abby Choi and several others.

== In popular culture ==
In 2015, a crime-thriller film titled Port of Call, directed by Philip Yung and starring veteran Hong Kong actor Aaron Kwok as a veteran police detective solving a brutal murder, was released in Hong Kong. The film was adapted based on the true story of the Wong Ka-mui murder case, even though it was mixed with fictional elements. In this film, where the characters modelled after their real-life counterparts were addressed by different names, Chinese actress Jessie Li portrayed the victim "Wang Jiamei" or "Wong Kai-mui", while the killer "Ting Chi-chung" was portrayed by Hong Kong actor Michael Ning.

In 2019, criminology professor Chan Heng Choon Oliver of the City University of Hong Kong wrote a book titled A Global Casebook of Sexual Homicide, and he dedicated the sixth chapter to the summary and analysis of the Wong Ka-mui murder case, in which he analyzed the motives of those who committed murder that contained sexual elements, including Ting Kai-tai.

== See also ==
- Lam Kor-wan
- List of solved missing person cases (2000s)
