= 10th Asian Film Awards =

2016 edition of award ceremony

- Date: March 17, 2016
- Site: Macau

Highlights
- Best Film: The Assassin
- Most awards: The Assassin (8)
- Most nominations: The Assassin (9)

The 10th Asian Film Awards are the 2016 edition of the Asian Film Awards. The ceremony was held at the Venetian Theatre in The Venetian Casino and Hotel in Macau.

== Winners and nominees ==
Winners are listed first and highlighted in bold.

| Best Film | Best Director |
|---|---|
| **The Assassin** (Taiwan) / (China) / (Hong Kong); Bajirao Mastani (India); Mountains May Depart (China) / (Japan) / (France); Mr. Six (China); Three Stories of Love (Japan); Veteran (South Korea) | **Hou Hsiao-hsien – The Assassin** (Taiwan) / (China) / (Hong Kong); Guan Hu – Mr. Six (China); Hirokazu Koreeda – Our Little Sister (Japan); Jia Zhangke – Mountains May Depart (China) / (Japan) / (France); Ryoo Seung-wan – Veteran (South Korea) |
| Best Actor | Best Actress |
| **Lee Byung-hun – Inside Men** (South Korea); Donnie Yen – Ip Man 3 (Hong Kong); Feng Xiaogang – Mr. Six (China); John Arcilla – Heneral Luna (Philippines); Masatoshi Nagase – Sweet Bean (Japan) / (Germany) / (France) | **Shu Qi – The Assassin** (Taiwan); Haruka Ayase – Our Little Sister (Japan); Karena Lam – Zinnia Flower (Taiwan); Kim Hye-soo – Coin Locker Girl (South Korea); Zhao Tao – Mountains May Depart (China) / (Japan) / (France) |
| Best Supporting Actor | Best Supporting Actress |
| **Tadanobu Asano – Journey to the Shore** (Japan) / (France); Cheng Jen-shuo – Thanatos, Drunk (Taiwan); Michael Ning – Port of Call (Hong Kong); Oh Dal-su – Assassination (South Korea); Zhang Jin – Ip Man 3 (Hong Kong) | **Zhou Yun – The Assassin** (Taiwan) / (China) / (Hong Kong); Anna Tsuchiya – Gonin Saga (Japan); Cherry Ngan – Mojin: The Lost Legend (China); Juri Ueno – The Beauty Inside (South Korea); Park So-dam – The Priests (South Korea) |
| Best Newcomer | Best Screenwriter |
| **Jessie Li – Port of Call** (Hong Kong); Kim Seol-hyun – Gangnam Blues (South Korea); Lee Hong-chi – Thanatos, Drunk (Taiwan); Ryōko Fujino – Solomon's Perjury (Japan); Vicky Kaushal – Masaan (India) / (France); Waruntorn Paonil – Snap (Thailand) | **Jia Zhangke – Mountains May Depart** (China) / (Japan) / (France); Kiyoshi Kurosawa, Takashi Ujita – Journey to the Shore (Japan) / (France); Philip Yung – Port of Call (Hong Kong); Ryoo Seung-wan – Veteran (South Korea); Vishal Bhardwaj – Talvar (India) |
| Best Cinematographer | Best Production Designer |
| **Mark Lee Ping Bin – The Assassin** (Taiwan) / (China) / (Hong Kong); Christopher Doyle – Port of Call (Hong Kong); Kim Woo-hyung – Assassination (South Korea); Pan Lou – Mr. Six (China); Yasushi Sasakibara, Yoshiaki Yamamoto – Gonin Saga (Japan) | **Hwarng Wern-ying – The Assassin** (Taiwan) / (China) / (Hong Kong); Benjamin Padero, Carlo Tabije – Heneral Luna (Philippines); Cho Hwa-sung – Inside Men (South Korea); Harada Tetsuo – Kakekomi (Japan); Ken Mak – Ip Man 3 (Hong Kong) |
| Best Composer | Best Editor |
| **Lim Giong – The Assassin** (Taiwan) / (China) / (Hong Kong); Amit Trivedi – Bombay Velvet (India); Bang Jun-seok – The Throne (South Korea); Naoko Eto, Otomo Yoshihide – Journey to the Shore (Japan) / (France); Sanjay Leela Bhansali – Bajirao Mastani (India) | **William Chang, Chu Ka-yat, Liao Ching-sung, Wong Hoi, Philip Yung – Port of Call** (Hong Kong); Kim Sang-bum, Kim Jae-bum – Veteran (South Korea); Rajesh G. Pandey – Bajirao Mastani (India); Tu Yiran – Jian Bing Man (China); Yasuyuki Ōzeki – Bakuman (Japan) |
| Best Visual Effects | Best Costume Designer |
| **Prasad Sutar – Bajirao Mastani** (India); Choi Jae-cheon, Jo Yong-seok, Lee Jeon-hyoung – The Tiger: An Old Hunter's Tale (South Korea); Ellen Poon, Jason H. Snell, Tang Bingbing – Monster Hunt (China) / (Hong Kong); Onoue Katsuro – Attack on Titan (Japan); V. Srinivas Mohan – Baahubali: The Beginning (India) | **Lee Ji-yeon, Shim Hyun-seob – The Throne** (South Korea); Anju Modi, Maxima Basu – Bajirao Mastani (India); Carlo Tabije – Heneral Luna (Philippines); Hwarng Wern-ying – The Assassin (Taiwan) / (China) / (Hong Kong); Masae Miyamoto – Kakekomi (Japan) |
| Best Sound | Highest-grossing Asian Film of 2015 |
| **Chu Shih-yi, Tu Duu-chih, Wu Shu-yao – The Assassin** (Taiwan) / (China) / (Hong Kong); Kim Suk-won, Park Joo-gang – Assassination (South Korea); George Lee Yiu-keung, Kinson Tsang, Yiu Chun Hin – Monster Hunt (China) / (Hong Kong); Nishiyama Toru – The Inerasable (Japan); Watanabe Shinji – Bakuman (Japan) | **Monster Hunt** (China) / (Hong Kong) |
| Lifetime Achievement Award | AFA Next Generation Award |
| **Yuen Woo-ping** (Hong Kong); **Kirin Kiki** (Japan) | **Yoo Ah-in** (South Korea) |
| AFA 10th Anniversary Special Award | Outstanding Contribution to Asian Cinema Award |
| **Feng Xiaogang** (China) | **Li Qiankuan** (China) |
