= 35th Hong Kong Film Awards =

2016 Hong Kong Film Awards

- Final revision poster modified by Hong Kong Film Awards Association
- Date: 3 April 2016
- Site: Hong Kong Cultural Centre
- Hosted by: Sean Lau
- Directed by: Derek Yee
- Organised by: Hong Kong Film Awards Association Ltd

Highlights
- Most nominations: Port of Call (13)

The 35th Hong Kong Film Awards presentation ceremony took place in Hong Kong Cultural Centre on 3 April 2016. The host of the awards ceremony was Sean Lau. The state-owned China Central Television did not air the program as it had previously for every year since 1991; this was because the film nominated for best picture in the awards, Ten Years, was seen to be critical of China's influence over Hong Kong. The Chinese government was reported to have ordered the state broadcaster not to broadcast the ceremony.

== Awards ==
Winners are listed first, highlighted in boldface, and indicated with a double dagger (‡).

**Best Film**: **Andrew Choi and Ng Ka-Leung — Ten Years**‡; Benny Chan, Alvin Lam and Stanley Tong — Little Big Master; Huang Jianxin, Nansun Shi and Yu Dong — The Taking of Tiger Mountain; Raymond Wong and Pang Yuk-Lam — Ip Man 3; Julia Chu — Port of Call	**Best Director**: **Tsui Hark — The Taking of Tiger Mountain**‡; Adrian Kwan — Little Big Master; Derek Yee — I Am Somebody; Wilson Yip — Ip Man 3; Philip Yung — Port of Call
**Best Screenplay**: **Philip Yung — Port of Call**‡; Adrian Kwan and Hannah Chang — Little Big Master; Derek Yee — I Am Somebody; Saville Chan and Adam Wong — She Remembers, He Forgets; Lau Ho-Leung — Two Thumbs Up	**Best Actor**: **Aaron Kwok — Port of Call**‡; Andy Lau — Lost and Love; Nick Cheung — Keeper of Darkness; Tony Leung Ka Fai — The Taking of Tiger Mountain; Jacky Cheung — Heaven in the Dark
**Best Actress**: **Jessie Li — Port Of Call**‡; Tang Wei — A Tale of Three Cities; Miriam Yeung — Little Big Master; Sylvia Chang — Office; Karena Lam — Heaven in the Dark	**Best Supporting Actor**: **Michael Ning — Port Of Call**‡; Andrew Lam — Full Strike; Louis Cheung — Keeper of Darkness; Zhang Jin — SPL II: A Time for Consequences; Zhang Jin — Ip Man 3
**Best Supporting Actress**: **Elaine Jin — Port Of Call**‡; Qin Hailu — A Tale of Three Cities; Anna Ng — Little Big Master; Janice Man — Helios; Angelica Lee — Murmur of the Hearts	**Best New Performer**: **Michael Ning — Port Of Call**‡; J. Arie — Get Outta Here; Sisley Choi — Keeper of Darkness; Cecilia So — She Remembers, He Forgets; Jessie Li — Port Of Call
**Best Cinematography**: **Christopher Doyle — Port Of Call**‡; Wang Yu — A Tale of Three Cities; Pakie Chan — To the Fore; Choi Sung-fai — The Taking of Tiger Mountain; Kenny Tse — Ip Man 3	**Best Film Editing**: **Cheung Ka-fai — Ip Man 3**‡; Chan Ki Hop, Poon Hung-Yiu and Curran Pang — To the Fore; David Richardson — SPL II: A Time for Consequences; Yu Bai-Yang — The Taking of Tiger Mountain; Liao Ching-sung, Wong Hoi, Philip Yung and Chu Ka-Yat — Port Of Call
**Best Art Direction**: **William Chang and Alfred Yau — Office**‡; Tim Yip and James Cheung — A Tale of Three Cities; Horace Ma — The Crossing II; Yohei Taneda and Attis Lee — Monster Hunt; Yi Zhen-Zhou — The Taking of Tiger Mountain	**Best Costume Make Up Design**: **Kenneth Yee — Monster Hunt**‡; Tim Yip and William Fung — A Tale of Three Cities; Chen Tongxun — The Crossing II; Kwon Yoojin — The Taking of Tiger Mountain; William Chang and Shandy Lui — Office
**Best Action Choreography**: **Li Chung Chi — SPL II: A Time for Consequences**‡; Jackie Chan and JC Stunt Team — Dragon Blade; Chin Ka-lok — Helios; Yuen Bun — The Taking of Tiger Mountain; Yuen Wo-ping — Ip Man 3	**Best Original Film Score**: **Dayu Lo and Chan Fai Young — Office**‡; Taro Iwashiro — The Crossing II; Day Tai — She Remembers, He Forgets; William Wu — The Taking of Tiger Mountain; Ding Ke — Port of Call
**Best Original Film Song**: **We Almost Fly — She Remembers, He Forgets**‡; Composer: Day Tai; Lyrics Saville Chan; Singer: Feanna Wong; Vortex — The Crossing II; Composer/Singer: Lo Tayu; Lyrics Lin Xi; Wong Ka Yan — Wong Ka Yan; Composer: Benny Lau; Lyrics Chan Wing-Him; Singer: Wong Yau-Nam; Murmur of the Hearts — Murmur of the Hearts; Composer: Chen Chien-Chen; Lyrics Huang Ting and Chen Chien-Chen; Singer: Rene Liu; Darkness on the Sea — Port of Call; Composer/Lyrics/Singer: Ding Ke	**Best Sound Design**: **Kinson Tsang, George Lee and Yiu Chun-Hin** **— The Taking of Tiger Mountain**‡; Kinson Tsang and George Lee — Keeper of Darkness; Kinson Tsang, George Lee and Yiu Chun-Hin — Monster Hunt; David M. Richardson, Tu Duu-Shih and Wu Shu-Yao — Office; Kinson Tsang and Yiu Chun-Hin — Ip Man 3
**Best Visual Effects**: **Jason Snell, Ellen Poon and Tang Bingbing — Monster Hunt**‡; Enoch Chan and Felix Lai — Keeper of Darkness; Wook Kim — The Taking of Tiger Mountain; Ken Law and Tommy Hellowing — Office; Raymond Leung, Emil Yee and Garrett K Lam — Ip Man 3	**Best New Director**: **Raman Hui — Monster Hunt**‡; Nick Cheung — Keeper of Darkness; Lau Ho-leung — Two Thumbs Up
**Best Film from Mainland and Taiwan**: **The Assassin (Taiwan)** ‡; Mountains May Depart (mainland China); Our Times (Taiwan); Wolf Totem (mainland China); Blind Massage (mainland China)	**Lifetime Achievement**: **Lihua Li**‡
**Professional Achievement**: **David Chow (Lighting)**‡

== Censorship ==
The Hong Kong Film Awards announced 21 film awards in all, but there were only 20 according to reports in the mainland Chinese news media. Major mainland news websites, including Sina and Tencent, which covered the awards ceremony on 3 April 2 016 neglected to mention the winner of best picture, considered one of Asia's top film awards. In mainland Chinese cities where TVB, the main Hong Kong television channel, is aired, users on social media reported that the programme was blacked out and replaced with a cooking programme.
