= Hua Li Shang Ban Zu =

華麗上班族 or 华丽上班族, may refer to following videos adapted from the stage Design For Living produced by Sylvia Chang:

- Gorgeous Workers, 2017 Chinese television series starring Choo Ja-hyun, Hans Zhang and Ken Chu
- Office (2015 Hong Kong film), 2015 Hong Kong-Chinese musical comedy-drama film
