= Asian Film Award for Best Supporting Actor =

Asian Film Awards

Asian Film Awards for Best Supporting Actor
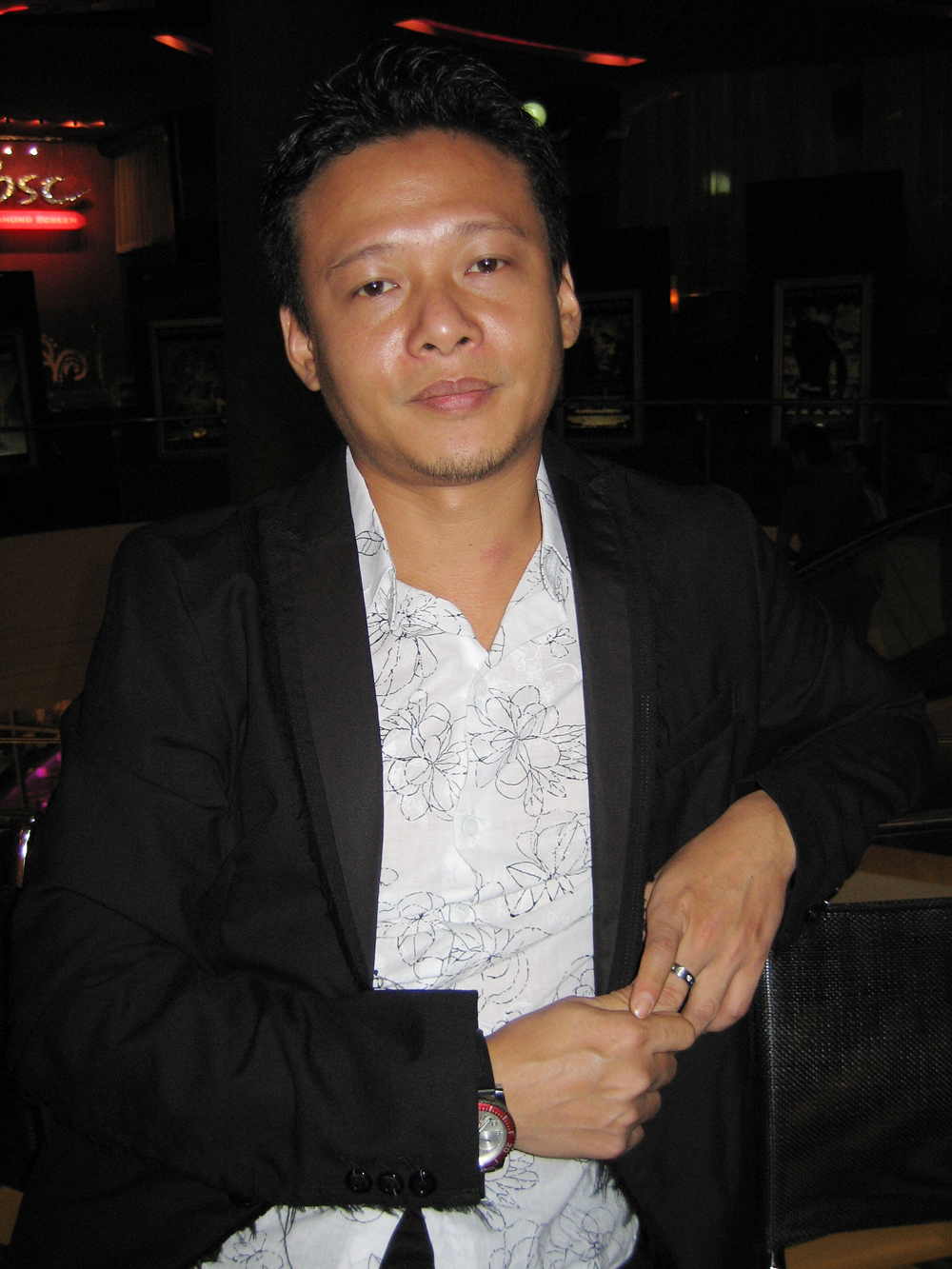
- The 2025 recipient: Lee Kang-sheng
- Awarded for: Best performance in Asian Cinema in the support role
- Presented by: The Asian Film Awards Academy (AFAA)
- First award: 2007
- Final award: 2025
- Winner (2025): Lee Kang-sheng
- Website: www.asianfilmawards.asia

Asian Film Award for Best Supporting Actor has been awarded annually since 2008 by the Hong Kong International Film Festival Society.

== Winners and nominees ==
=== 2000s ===
| Year | Winner and nominees | English title | Original title |
|---|---|---|---|
| 2008 | (China) Sun Honglei | Mongol | Монгол |
| 2008 | (South Korea) Chun Ho-jin | Skeletons in the Closet | 좋지 아니한가 |
| 2008 | (Japan) Kaoru Kobayashi | Tokyo Tower: Mom and Me, and Sometimes Dad | 東京タワー 〜オカンとボクと、時々、オトン |
| 2008 | (Thailand) Mario Maurer | The Love of Siam | รักแห่งสยาม |
| 2008 | (Japan) Shin'ichi Tsutsumi | Always: Sunset on Third Street 2 | ALWAYS 続・三丁目の夕日 |
| 2009 | (South Korea) Jung Woo-sung | The Good, the Bad, the Weird | 좋은 놈, 나쁜 놈, 이상한 놈 |
| 2009 | (Hong Kong) Nick Cheung | Beast Stalker | 證人 |
| 2009 | (South Korea) Lee Byung-hun | The Good, the Bad, the Weird | (좋은 놈, 나쁜 놈, 이상한 놈 |
| 2009 | (Japan) Tsutsumi Shinichi | Suspect X | 容疑者Xの献身 |
| 2009 | (China) Wang Xueqi | Forever Enthralled | 梅蘭芳 |

=== 2010s ===
| Year | Winner and nominees | English title | Original title |
|---|---|---|---|
| 2010 | (Hong Kong) Nicholas Tse | Bodyguards and Assassins | 十月圍城 |
| 2010 | (Japan) Eita | Dear Doctor | ディア・ドクター |
| 2010 | (China) Huang Xiaoming | The Message | 风声 |
| 2010 | (South Korea) Won Bin | Mother | 마더 |
| 2010 | (Taiwan) Tou Chung-hua | The Warrior and the Wolf | 狼災記 |
| 2011 | (Hong Kong) Sammo Hung | Ip Man 2 | 葉問2:宗師傳奇 |
| 2011 | (China) Huang Xiaoming | Sacrifice | 趙氏孤兒 |
| 2011 | (Japan) Masaki Okada | Confessions | 告白 |
| 2011 | (South Korea) Ryoo Seung-bum | The Unjust | 부당거래 |
| 2011 | (South Korea) Yoo Hae-jin | Moss | 이끼 |
| 2012 | (Taiwan) Lawrence Ko | Jump Ashin! | Fan gun ba A-xin! |
| 2012 | (Taiwan) Umin Boya | Seediq Bale | 賽德克•巴萊 |
| 2012 | (South Korea) Lee Je-hoon | The Front Line | 고지전 |
| 2012 | (Thailand) Mario Maurer | The Outrage | U mong pa meung |
| 2013 | (India) Nawazuddin Siddiqui | Talaash: The Answer Lies Within | |
| 2013 | (South Korea) Ha Jung-woo | Nameless Gangster: Rules of the Time | 범죄와의 전쟁 Bumchoiwaui Junjaeng |
| 2013 | (Japan) Ryō Kase | Like Someone in Love | ライク・サムワン・イン・ラブ |
| 2013 | (Hong Kong) Chapman To | Diva | 華麗之後 |
| 2013 | (Taiwan) Rhydian Vaughan | Girlfriend, Boyfriend | 女朋友。男朋友 |
| 2014 | (China) Huang Bo | No Man's Land | 无人区 |
| 2014 | (Taiwan) Mark Chao | So Young | 致我们终将逝去的青春 |
| 2014 | (South Korea) Jung Woo-sung | Cold Eyes | 감시자들 Gamsijadeul |
| 2014 | (Japan) Joe Odagiri | The Great Passage | 舟を編む Fune o Amu |
| 2014 | (Japan) Satoshi Tsumabuki | Tokyo Family | 東京家族 Tōkyō Kazoku |
| 2015 | (China) Wang Zhiwen | The Golden Era | 黄金时代 |
| 2015 | (China) Chen Jianbin | Paradise in Service | 軍中樂園 Jun Zhong Le Yuan |
| 2015 | (South Korea) Cho Jin-woong | A Hard Day | 끝까지 간다 Kkeutkkaji Ganda |
| 2015 | (Japan) Hideaki Itō | Wood Job! | Wood Job! （ウッジョブ） 神去なあなあ日常; Wood Job! Kamusari Nana Nichijo |
| 2015 | (China) Qin Hao | Blind Massage | 推拿 Tui Na |
| 2016 | (Japan) Tadanobu Asano | Journey to the Shore | 岸辺の旅 |
| 2016 | (Taiwan) Cheng Jen-shuo | Thanatos, Drunk | 醉‧生夢死 |
| 2016 | (Hong Kong) Michael Ning | Port of Call | 踏血尋梅 |
| 2016 | (South Korea) Oh Dae-soo | Assassination | 암살 |
| 2016 | (Hong Kong) Max Zhang | Ip Man 3 | 葉問3 |
| 2017 | (Hong Kong) Lam Suet | Trivisa | 树大招风 |
| 2017 | (South Korea) Jun Kunimura | The Wailing | 곡성 |
| 2017 | (South Korea) Ma Dong-seok | Train to Busan | 부산행 |
| 2017 | (Japan) Gō Ayano | Rage | 怒り |
| 2017 | (China) Dong Chengpeng | I Am Not Madame Bovary | 我不是潘金莲 |
| 2018 | (South Korea) Yang Ik-june | Wilderness | あゝ、荒野 |
| 2018 | (South Korea) Yoo Hae-jin | A Taxi Driver | 택시운전사 |
| 2018 | (China) Geng Le | Angels Wear White | 嘉年华 |
| 2018 | (China) Tian Zhuangzhuang | Love Education | 相爱相亲 |
| 2018 | (Taiwan) Eddie Peng | Our Time Will Come | 明月幾時有 |
| 2019 | (China) ZHANG Yu | Dying to Survive | 我不是药神 |
| 2019 | (South Korea) Kwon Hae-hyo | Hotel by the River | |
| 2019 | (Japan) Shinya Tsukamoto | Killing | 斬、 |
| 2019 | (India) Vicky Kaushal | Sanju | संजू |
| 2019 | (Hong Kong) River Huang | Tracey | 翠丝 |

=== 2020s ===
| Year | Winner and nominees | English title | Original title |
|---|---|---|---|
| 2020 | (Japan) Ryo Kase | To the Ends of the Earth | 旅のおわり世界のはじまり |
| 2020 | (South Korea) Choi Woo-shik | Parasite | 기생충 |
| 2020 | (China) Jinpa | Balloon | དབུགས་ལྒང་། (Tibetan); 气球 (Simplified Chinese) |
| 2020 | (Taiwan) Liu Kuan-ting | A Sun | 陽光普照 |
| 2020 | (Hong Kong) Ben Yuen | Twilight's Kiss | 叔．叔 |
| 2021 | (South Korea) Kim Hyun-bin | The Silent Forest | 無聲 |
| 2021 | (China) Yu Hewei | Cliff Walkers | 懸崖之上 |
| 2021 | (South Korea) Park Jung-min | Deliver Us from Evil | 다만 악에서 구하소서 |
| 2021 | (Hong Kong) Tse Kwan-ho | Drifting | 濁水漂流 |
| 2021 | (Japan) Uno Shohei | The Voice of Sin | 罪の声 |
2022
| 2022 | (Japan) Hio Miyazawa | Egoists | エゴイスト |
| 2022 | (Japan) Masaki Okada | Drive My Car | ドライブ・マイ・カー |
| 2022 | (South Korea) Oh Kwang-rok | Return to Seoul | Retour à Séoul |
| 2022 | (Hong Kong) Michael Hui | Where the Wind Blows | 風再起時 |
| 2022 | (South Korea) Yim Si-wan | Emergency Declaration | 비상선언비 |
2023
| 2023 | (South Korea) Park Hoon | 12.12: The Day | 서울의 봄 |
| 2023 | (Japan) Nakamura Shidō II | Kubi | 首 |
| 2023 | (South Korea) Park Jeong-min | Smugglers | 밀수 |
| 2023 | (Hong Kong) Sean Wong | Time Still Turns the Pages | 年少日記 |
| 2023 | (Malaysia) Jack Tan | Abang Adik | 富都青年 |
2024
| 2024 | (Taiwan) Lee Kang-sheng | Stranger Eyes | 默視錄 |
| 2024 | (Japan) Ken Mitsuishi | All the Long Nights | 夜明けのすべて |
| 2024 | (Japan) Sosuke Ikematsu | My Sunshine | ぼくのお日さま |
| 2024 | (Hong Kong) Chu Pak Hong | The Last Dance | 破·地獄 |
| 2024 | (Hong Kong) Philip Ng | Twilight of the Warriors: Walled In | 九龍城寨之圍城 |
