= Journey to the Shore =

2015 film

- Film poster
- Directed by: Kiyoshi Kurosawa
- Screenplay by: Kiyoshi Kurosawa; Takashi Ujita
- Based on: Kishibe no Tabi by Kazumi Yumoto
- Starring: Tadanobu Asano; Eri Fukatsu
- Cinematography: Akiko Ashizawa
- Edited by: Tsuyoshi Imai
- Music by: Otomo Yoshihide; Naoko Eto
- Release dates: 17 May 2015 (Cannes); 1 October 2015 (Japan)
- Running time: 128 minutes
- Country: Japan
- Language: Japanese

Journey to the Shore (Japanese: 岸辺の旅, Hepburn: Kishibe no Tabi) is a 2015 Japanese romantic drama film directed by Kiyoshi Kurosawa, starring Tadanobu Asano and Eri Fukatsu. It is adapted from Kazumi Yumoto's novel Kishibe no Tabi. It screened in the Un Certain Regard section at the 2015 Cannes Film Festival, where Kurosawa won the prize for Best Director. It was released in Japan on 1 October 2015.

== Plot ==
Mizuki (Eri Fukatsu) is a piano teacher who gives lessons to children. Her husband, Yusuke (Tadanobu Asano), has been missing for three years. He comes back home as a ghost and tells her that he died from drowning in the sea. His body disappeared at sea, eaten by crabs. Since then he has traveled through Japan and made friends with the living and other people "like him". He asks Mizuki to accompany him on a journey. Yusuke shows her the beautiful places he discovered and visit the people who have been kind to him.

== Cast ==
- Tadanobu Asano as Yusuke
- Eri Fukatsu as Mizuki
- Masao Komatsu as Shimakage
- Yū Aoi as Tomoko
- Akira Emoto as Hoshitani

== Release ==
The film screened in the Un Certain Regard section at the 2015 Cannes Film Festival on 17 May 2015. It also screened at the 2015 Toronto International Film Festival and the 2015 New York Film Festival. It was released in Japan on 1 October 2015.

== Reception ==
On review aggregator website Rotten Tomatoes, the film holds an approval rating of 57% based on 23 reviews, with an average rating of 6.21/10. On Metacritic, the film has a weighted average score of 52 out of 100, based on 6 critics, indicating "mixed or average reviews".

David Rooney of The Hollywood Reporter gave the film an unfavorable review, saying: "Too much lethargic, unclear plotting and saccharine melodrama mean the gentle film is seldom as intriguing as its premise, even if Kurosawa as always provides arresting visual moments and has a commanding way of building atmosphere out of stillness." Meanwhile, Maggie Lee of Variety said: "Fans of Kurosawa's earlier psycho-thrillers may desire more eeriness and visual panache, but those who've accepted the helmer's conscious change of tune and pace should be gently touched." Derek Elley of Film Business Asia gave the film a 7 out of 10, commenting that Kurosawa "bounces back with a touching, offbeat love story between life and death."

Cahiers du cinéma placed the film at number 10 on the "Top 10 Films of 2015" list.

== Accolades ==
Award	Date of ceremony	Category	Recipient(s)	Result	Ref(s)
Cannes Film Festival	23 May 2015	Un Certain Regard Award for Best Director	Kiyoshi Kurosawa	Won	
Asian Film Awards	17 March 2016	Best Supporting Actor	Tadanobu Asano	Won	
Japanese Movie Critics Awards	26 May 2016	Best Actor	Tadanobu Asano	Won	
