= Magic to Win =

2011 Hong Kong film by Wilson Yip

- Film poster
- Directed by: Wilson Yip
- Written by: Edmond Wong; Dali Chen
- Produced by: Raymond Wong
- Starring: Wu Chun; Karena Ng; Raymond Wong; Louis Koo; Wu Jing
- Cinematography: Cheung Man-po
- Edited by: Cheung Ka-fai
- Music by: Chiu Tsang-hei; Andy Cheung
- Production companies: Pegasus Motion Pictures; Huayi Brothers
- Distributed by: Pegasus Motion Pictures
- Release date: 1 December 2011
- Running time: 100 mins
- Country: Hong Kong
- Language: Cantonese
- Budget: $8 million (estimated)

Magic to Win (Chinese: 開心魔法, meaning "Happy Magic") is a 2011 Hong Kong film directed by Wilson Yip. The film stars Wu Chun, Karena Ng, Raymond Wong, Wu Jing and Louis Koo.

While promoted as being a return to the Happy Ghost film series which 1984 to 1991, film critic Derek Elley found the film generally unrelated to the film outside of its school setting and fantasy elements. He gave the film a negative review finding Wilson Yip's direction lazy and the story episodic.

== Plot ==
The world consists of five elements: gold, wood, water, fire and earth. In the wizard world of "Magic to Win", the story also revolves around the "Five Element Wizardry", portraying a story that surpasses our imagination.

Kang Sengui (Raymond Wong), a university professor, is the Water Magician of the "Five Elements Wizardry". Although he uses magic spells in his daily life, he keeps his powers a secret from his peers. One night, his power is accidentally transmitted to his student, Macy (Karena Wu), after they were both struck by lightning. Macy begins recklessly using her newfound powers for personal gain and money-making with advertising help from her roommates.

Meanwhile, Bi Yewu, an ambitious Fire Magician, sets out on a mission to capture the elemental magicians in order to open a time rift in an attempt to change history and save his parents who perished in a fire in his youth. He captures Wood Magician Gu Xinyue, an author with precognitive gifts; and later confronts and captures Earth Magician Ling Feng. Macy encounters Ling Feng's amnesiac spirit, and slowly begins to realize there is more to magic than just profit. Professor Kang promises to teach her to use magic properly.

Bi Yewu captures Charlie, a renowned magician and Metal Magician. Finally, he comes for Professor Kang, only to realize Macy has his power. With all magicians gathered, Bi Yewu combines their powers to open the rift. The world is put on the moment of doom. Inside the rift, Bi Yewu is unable to alter history. Professor Kang, who regained his powers after another shockwave collision between him and Macy, convinces him to keep moving forward. Gu Xinyue and Charlie escape confinement while Macy rejoins Ling Feng's body and soul. With all five magicians together, they close the rift.

Sometime later, Macy and her volleyball team enters an intense match that ends with them winning. This victory proves Macy is far more capable than she realizes, even without magic. Professor Kang is promoted to vice principal. And Bi Yewu redeems himself.

== Cast ==
- Wu Chun as Ling Feng: Earth Magician. He lost his memory and powers and body after losing a battle to the Fire Magician.
- Karena Ng as Ching Mei-si/Macy Cheng: She gained Professor Kang's power by accident, and frequently uses it for personal gain.
- Raymond Wong as Professor Hong Sam-gwai/Kang Sen Gui: Water Magician who teaches at Macy's college. He tries to teach Macy the best ways of using magic.
- Louis Koo as Ku San-yu/Gu Xinyue: Wood Magician. He uses his ability of clairvoyance for his writing.
- Wu Jing as Bi Yewu: Fire Magician and the main antagonist. He sets out to capture all the elemental magicians for his own purpose.
- Tonny Jan as Charlie: Metal Magician and a stage magician.
- Yan Ni as Lau Wah-li: Volleyball coach. She is strict and sees sports as her whole existence.

== Production ==
While the film was promoted as being a return of the Happy Ghost film series from 1984 to 1991, film critic Derek Elley said that Magic to Win has little in common with those films apart from a school setting and a mixture of every life with the supernatural.

== Release and reception ==
Magic to Win was released in Hong Kong and China on 1 December 2011.

Writing for Film Business Asia, Derek Elley found the film to be "lazily directed" by Wilson Yip and that it had "no comic rhythm to the direction" leading the film to "stroll episodically along, with one after another sequence of power-palming and a so-what final plot revelation."

=== Awards and nominations ===
- 31st Hong Kong Film Awards
