= Little Big Master =

2015 Hong Kong film by Adrian Kwan

- Film poster
- Traditional Chinese: 五個小孩的校長
- Simplified Chinese: 五个小孩的校长
- Hanyu Pinyin: Wǔ Gè Xiǎo Hái De Xiào Zhǎng
- Jyutping: Ng5 Go3 Siu2 Haai4 Dik1 Haau6 Zeong2
- Directed by: Adrian Kwan
- Screenplay by: Adrian Kwan; Hannah Chang
- Produced by: Benny Chan; Alvin Lam; Stanley Tong
- Starring: Miriam Yeung; Louis Koo
- Cinematography: Anthony Pun
- Edited by: Curran Pang
- Music by: Wong Kin-wai
- Production companies: Universe Entertainment; Sil-Metropole Organisation; Sun Entertainment Culture; One Cool Film Production; Beijing Monster Pictures; Yunnan Parashorea Cathayensis Culture Communication; Yiming Culture Communication; Foshan Joint Media Group; Sirius Pictures International
- Distributed by: Universe Films Distribution
- Release date: 19 March 2015
- Running time: 112 minutes
- Country: Hong Kong
- Language: Cantonese
- Box office: HK$46.6 million

Little Big Master is a 2015 Hong Kong drama film co-written and directed by Adrian Kwan. The film stars Miriam Yeung and Louis Koo. The film is based on a true story where Lilian Lui, former headmistress of an elite kindergarten in Discovery Bay who originally planned to retire to travel around the world with her husband Alvin Tse, takes up a job with a monthly salary of HK$4,500 to continue educating five remaining pupils single-handedly in Yuen Long's Yuen Kong Kindergarten, which was on the verge of closure in 2009, and puts her travel plans on hold. Little Big Master was a critical and commercial success, and was met with acclaim from audiences. It grossed HK$46.6 million at the Hong Kong box office and became the highest-grossing domestic film of 2015 in the territory.

== Plot ==
Lui Wai-hung (Miriam Yeung) is a headmistress of an international kindergarten. Feeling disillusioned with the education system, she quits her high-paying job as a principal and plans to travel around the world with her husband Tse Wing-tung (Louis Koo). However, she puts her travel plans on hold when she sees a news report about a school in Yuen Long, Yuen Tin Kindergarten, on television. On the verge of closure with severe financial problems and only five students left, the school can only use HK$4,500 to hire a headmaster and staff. Rekindling her passion for teaching, Lui applies for the job and hopes to help the five children, Ka-ka, Mei-chu, Siu-suet, and Pakistani sisters Jennie and Kitty, transfer to another school. Upon assuming her duties, Headmistress Lui discovers that the children all have different family problems. Ka-ka's father (Philip Keung) has been unable to work due to an injury and is thus often threatened by property developers with eviction; Mei-chu's parents were killed in a car crash during a stormy night and is being cared for by her aunt (Anna Ng), a restaurant employee; Siu-suet's mother was not approved for Hong Kong residency and therefore lives with her elderly scrap dealer father (Richard Ng), and Jennie and Kitty's father does not see a need for girls to study and did not allow his daughters to go to school anymore after school bus prices increased.

Faced with her students' problems, Lui does her best to help them, volunteering to pick up Kitty and Jennie for school and sorting out Ka-ka's family problems, among other things. At the same time, she also has to take care of school administrative duties and janitorial work. In addition, Lui reminds her students and their parents to set a goal for themselves, while her own goal is to be a teacher who never gives up. Later, when she finds out that she was unable to help her students transfer, she decides to admit new students to the school. At this time, however, Lui suffers from a recurrence of an old tumor.

== Cast ==
- Miriam Yeung as Lui Wai-hung (呂慧紅), headmistress of Yuen Tin Kindergarten, based on Lilian Lui
- Louis Koo as Tse Wing-tung (謝永東), Lui's husband who is a museum exhibition designer, based on Alvin Tse
- Winnie Ho as Ho Siu-suet (何小雪), a student of Yuen Tin Kindergarten
- Fu Shun-ying as Lo Ka-ka (盧嘉嘉), a student of Yuen Tin Kindergarten
- Keira Wang as Tam Mei-chu (譚美珠), a student of Yuen Tin Kindergarten
- Zaha Fathima as Kitty Fathima, a student of Yuen Tin Kindergarten
- Khan Nayab as Jennie Fathima, a student of Yuen Tin Kindergarten
- Richard Ng as Mr. Ho (何伯), Siu-suet's father
- Anna Ng as Auntie Han (嫻姨), Mei-chu's aunt
- Philip Keung as Lo Keung (盧強), Ka-ka's father
- Rain Lau as Mrs. Lo (強嫂), Ka-ka's mother
- Asnani Mena as Kitty and Jennie's mother
- Dhillion Harjit Singh as Kitty and Jennie's father
- Stanley Fung as Yuen Tin Village Office head
- Marc Ma as estate agent
- Fire Lee as Fung Tai-wai (馮大偉), Yuen Tin Village Rural Committee head
- Bonnie Wong as a janitor
- Alannah Ong as Yuen Tin Village Office head's wife
- Sammy Leung as Bowie Chin (錢寶宜), an old business friend of Lui whom is referred as the "Education King"
- Mimi Kung as Anita, teacher at King Kids International Kindergarten
- Ho Chun-ting as Martin Tong
- Ho Hing-fai as Martin's father
- Sin Kam as Martin's mother
- Chun Wong as Store Wong (士多黃)
- Alice Fung So-bor as Lui Wai-hung's mother
- Stephen Au as Lui Wai-hung's older brother
- Cindy Au as Lui Wai-hung's sister in-law
- Gregory Charles Rivers as Tony, museum manager
- Don Li as Kit (傑仔), museum staff
- Li Shing-cheong as a restaurant manager

== Reception ==
=== Critical ===
Maggie Lee of Variety gave the film a positive review and states the film "has a humongous heart." Clarence Tsui of The Hollywood Reporter also gave the film a positive review praising director Adrian Kwan's sincerity and performances by leading cast members Miriam Yeung and Louis Koo, while also praising performances by the film's child actors and refers the film as "an optimism-fueled film reliant more on sentimental brushstrokes than sharp social critique in presenting and understanding the tragedy and joy on screen." Yvonne Teh of South China Morning Post gave the film a score of four stars out of five and praises the film's story as "dramatic gold".

As per mixed review, Derek Elley of Film Business Asia gave a score of six out of ten praising the performances by the cast and criticizes the lack of real drama and conflict.

=== Box office ===
Little Big Master opened on 19 March 2015 in Hong Kong where it topped the box office for two consecutive weeks, earning a total of HK$16.1 million (US$2.07 million) after two weekends plus early previews. After twenty days of release, the film grossed HK$32.3 million (US$4.17 million). By the fourth weekend, Little Big Master remained in second place where it grossed a total of HK$39.3 million (US$5.07 million). By the end of its theatrical run, the film grossed a total of HK$46.6 million (US$6.01 million), making it the highest grossing domestic film and fifth highest grossing film overall of 2015 in Hong Kong.

== Accolades ==
Accolades
Ceremony	Category	Recipient	Outcome
35th Hong Kong Film Awards	Best Film	Little Big Master	Nominated
35th Hong Kong Film Awards	Best Director	Adrian Kwan	Nominated
35th Hong Kong Film Awards	Best Screenplay	Adrian Kwan, Hannah Chang	Nominated
35th Hong Kong Film Awards	Best Actress	Miriam Yeung	Nominated
35th Hong Kong Film Awards	Best Supporting Actress	Anna Ng	Nominated
