= Jessie Li =

Chinese actress

- Born: Li Junjie 李俊杰 (Simplified) 李俊傑 (Traditional); Lǐ Jùn-Jié (Mandarin); December 5, 1992 (age 33); Kunming, Yunnan, China
- Other name: Chun Xia (春夏)
- Occupation: Actress
- Years active: 2014–present
- Agent: Easy Entertainment (壹心娱乐)

Chinese name
- Simplified Chinese: 春夏
Transcriptions
Standard Mandarin
- Hanyu Pinyin: Chūn Xià

Jessie Li (Chinese: 李俊杰; born 5 December 1992), known professionally as Chun Xia, is a Chinese actress. She is best known for starring in Port of Call (2015), which earned her a Hong Kong Film Award for Best Actress.

== Biography ==
Li was born in Kunming.

== Endorsements ==
Since 2021, Prada named Jessie as its China ambassador.

== Filmography ==
=== Film ===
Year	English title	Chinese title	Role	Notes/Ref.
2015	Port of Call	踏血寻梅	Wang Jiamei	
2015	The Maid's Secrets	保姆的私密日記	Wu Xiaofen	Web film
2015	Golfville	高芙鎮	Lina	Short film
2016	One Night Only	天亮之前	Yu Qing	
2016	Shed Skin Papa	脱皮爸爸	Cai Zimiao	
2016	Hide and Seek	捉迷藏	Lulu	
2017	Our Time Will Come	明月几时有	Zhang Yongxian	
2017	The Hidden Sword	刀背藏身	Qingqing	
2018	Dude's Manual	脱单告急	Li Shushu	
2018	Theory of Ambitions	风再起时		Cameo
2019	The Place I Call Home	七里地		Short film
2020	Monster Run	怪物先生	Ji Mo	
2020	The Yin-Yang Master: Dream of Eternity	阴阳师: 晴雅集	Long Ye	
2020	Love Song 1980	恋曲1980	Mao Zhen	
2020	Caught in Time	除暴	Wen Juan	
2021	The Eleventh Chapter	第十一回	Jia Meiyi	
2025	The Way Out	阳光照耀青春里	Lin Chun Chun	

=== Television series ===
Year	English title	Chinese title	Role	Notes/Ref.
2014		我心灿烂	Zhao Jiahao	
2014		我的博士老公	Li Yue	
2015	Lovers & Couples	伙伴夫妻	Chen Xiaoqing	
2015	The House That Never Dies	朝内八十一号	Wang Xiuning	
2015	Years Such as Gold	岁月如金	Qi Shaofei	
2015	Good Time	大好时光	Aiqi	
TBA	A Love Never Lost	人生若如初见	Qiu Hong	

== Awards and nominations ==
Year	Awards	Category	Nominated work	Result	Ref.
2015	19th Bucheon International Fantastic Film Festival	Best Actress	Port of Call	Won	
2016	22nd Hong Kong Film Critics Society Award	Best Actress	Port of Call	Won	
2016	2015 Hong Kong Film Directors' Guild Awards	Best Actress	Port of Call	Won	
2016	11th Asian Film Awards	Best Newcomer	Port of Call	Won	
2016	52nd Golden Horse Film Festival and Awards	Best New Performer	Port of Call	Nominated	
2016	16th Chinese Film Media Awards	Best Actress	Port of Call	Nominated	
2016	16th Chinese Film Media Awards	Best New Performer	Port of Call	Won	
2016	35th Hong Kong Film Awards	Best Actress	Port of Call	Won	
2016	35th Hong Kong Film Awards	Best New Performer	Port of Call	Nominated	
2020	Forbes	China Celebrity 100 list	—N/a	74th	
