= Jumbo Tsang =

Hong Kong artist, actress and model (born 1991)

Jumbo Tsang Shuk-Nga (Chinese: 曾淑雅) is a Hong Kong artist, actress and model, formerly known by the stage name "Tsang Po" (Chinese: 曾寶). She won the Miss China (Hong Kong) title in 2011, as well as the "Most Popular Award" and "Miss Photogenic Award", becoming a triple champion., former TVB Manager Contract Artist.

== Biography ==
Jumbo Tsang grew up in the Hong Kong public housing estates in Sham Shui Po and Tsz Wan Shan. She attended St. Bonaventure Catholic Primary School and graduated from Form 5 of St. Bonaventure College in 2008.

In 2020, Tsang served as a program host for TVB. In April 2021, she became a contract artist of TVB management.

On July 21, 2023, Tsang announced her marriage on social platform.

On August 11, 2023, Tsang announced her pregnancy on social platform.

On November 15, 2023, Tsang announced the birth of her son on social platform.
