= Aaron Kwok =

Hong Kong singer and actor

- 郭富城
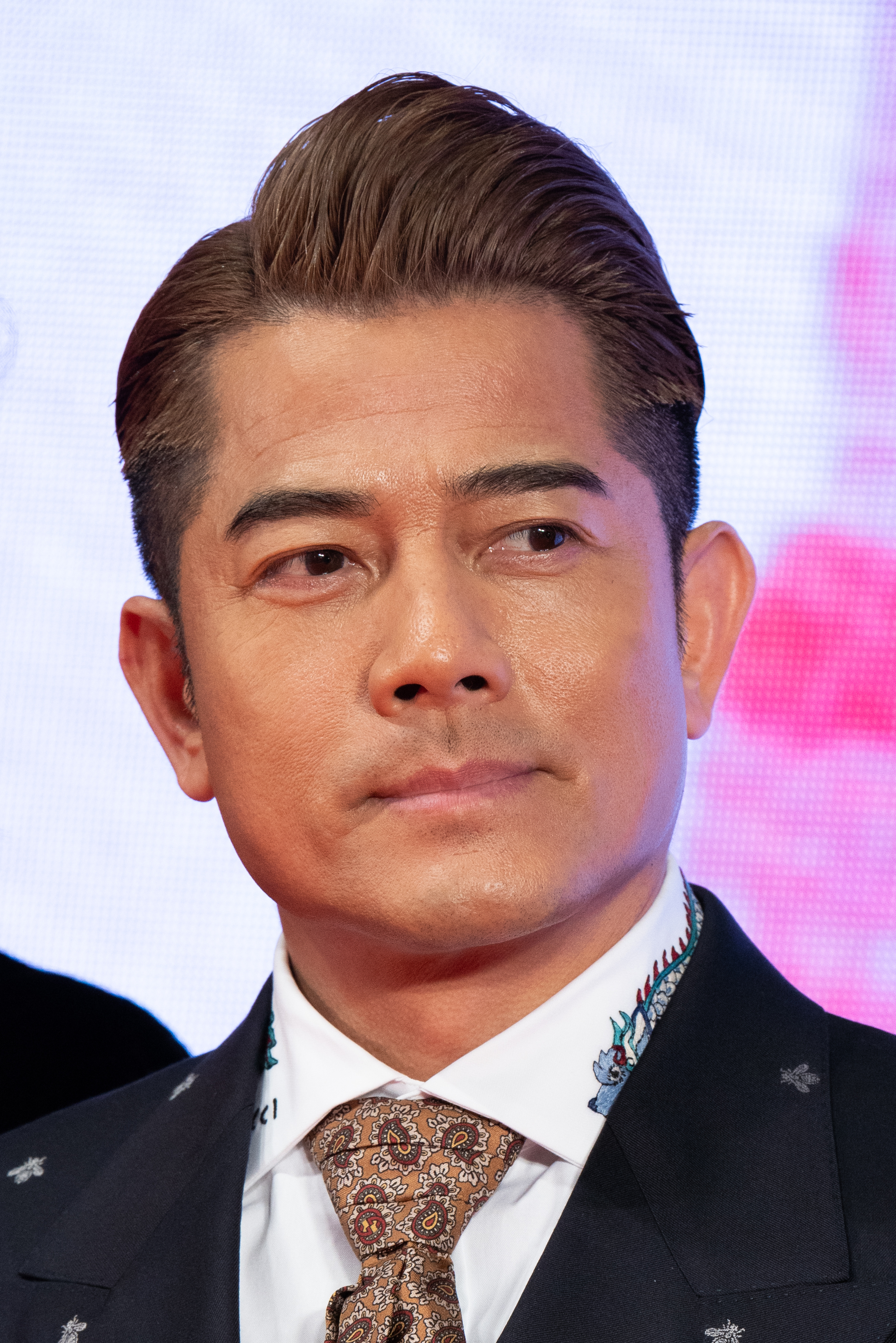
- Kwok in 2019
- Born: Kwok Fu-shing; 26 October 1965 (age 60); British Hong Kong
- Other name: Shing-Shing
- Citizenship: Hong Kong
- Education: St John's Co-education College
- Occupations: Singer; dancer; actor; racing driver
- Years active: 1984–present
- Organization: Aaron Kwok International Charity Foundation (Chinese: 郭富城國際慈善基金會)(2000-present)
- Spouse: Moka Fang (m. 2017)
- Children: 3 Daughters
- Musical career
- Genres: Cantopop; Mandopop; dance-pop
- Instrument: Vocals
- Labels: UFO Record (1990–1993); Warner Music Group (1993–2006); Music Nation Group (2006–2020)

Chinese name
- Chinese: 郭富城
Transcriptions
Standard Mandarin
- Hanyu Pinyin: Guō Fùchéng
Yue: Cantonese
- Jyutping: Gwok3 Fu3sing4
- Website: First Strong Workshop Ltd (Aaron Kwok Management Co.)

Aaron Kwok Fu-shing (born 26 October 1965) is a Hong Kong singer, dancer, and actor, known as one of Hong Kong's "Four Heavenly Kings". Active since the 1980s, he has released over 30 studio albums in Cantonese and Mandarin, mostly in the dance-pop genre, with elements of rock, R&B, soul, electronica and traditional Chinese music.

Concurrently with his music career, Kwok debuted as an actor with a role in the TVB television drama Genghis Khan (1987). He gained recognition in the film Saviour of the Soul (1991), for which he was nominated for a Hong Kong Film Award for Best Supporting Actor. His notable films include The Storm Riders (1998), China Strike Force (2000), Divergence (2005), After This Our Exile (2006), Cold War (2012) and its 2016 sequel, Port of Call (2015), for which he won the Hong Kong Film Award for Best Actor, and Project Gutenberg (2018).

== Early life ==
Kwok graduated from St John's Co-education College in Hong Kong. After graduating from secondary school, Kwok worked as a junior staff in King Fook Gold & Jewellery Co. Ltd. His father, who owns a small gold retail store, wanted him to gain experience in the business with the view of eventually handing the family business over to him. If not for one of Kwok's brothers taking over the gold business, his father would not have allowed him to join the entertainment industry. In 1984, he was fired for prolonged absenteeism (sick leave) caused by a foot muscle injury from trying the splits at a party.

In 1991, Kwok's older brother, Kwok Fu-kun, was shot dead outside the Sunbeam Theatre in North Point while chasing armed robbers who had raided his Marble Street jewelry store.

== Career ==
=== Early years ===
After being fired from a jewelry company in 1984 at the age of 19, Kwok, who only had a high school education and no formal dance training, enrolled in a dancer training programme at TVB and began performing in music videos and variety shows for other singers. In 1985, Kwok's performance in a song and dance segment at the Miss Bodybuilding competition caught the attention of TVB talent manager Florence Fung, who introduced him to the actor training programme at TVB in 1987. In 1990, Kwok appeared in a Taiwanese TV commercial for the Honda motorcycle DJ-1RR, which brought him instant popularity in Taiwan and launched his music career in Mandopop there.

=== Music ===
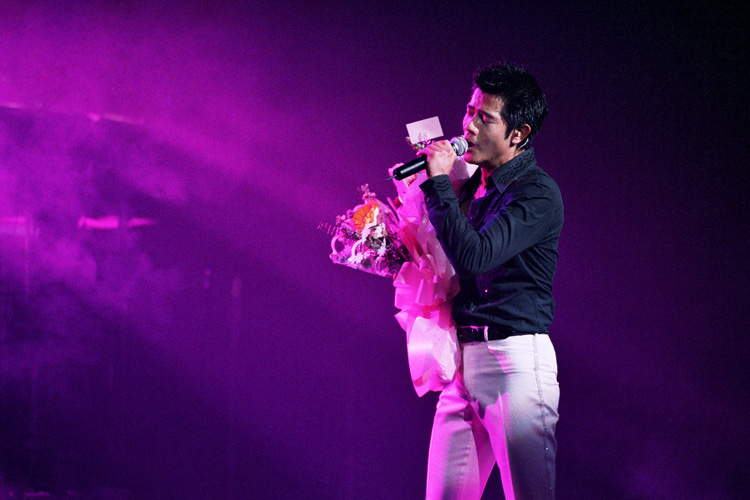
Aaron performing in San Francisco

Kwok began his music career in Taiwan with three Mandopop albums including the hit song "Loving You Forever" (對你愛不完) to accompany his dance moves, winning an award in the 1992 Jade Solid Gold Top 10 Awards. He shifted back to Hong Kong in 1991 and began producing Cantopop. The next few years saw his popularity reach fever-pitch, and he was soon ranked as one of the "Four Heavenly Kings". He won his first major awards with the 1991 Jade Solid Gold Top 10 Awards and 1991 RTHK Top 10 Gold Songs Awards. In 1999, Kwok collaborated with Janet Jackson for an international version of "Ask for More", a promotional single for Pepsi.

=== Dancer ===
As soon as Kwok entered the music industry in 1991, he started a fast-dancing trend (勁歌熱舞). Kwok's onstage dancing and displays has been known to be influenced by Michael Jackson. Later in his career, he is known to have won a prestigious top ten Hong Kong dance award (十大舞蹈家年獎). Of all the performing arts at which Kwok excels, stage appearances remain his perennial favourite. His dance accomplishments are also matched with stage displays. On 16 November 2007, he held an "Aaron Kwok De Show Reel Live" concert at Hong Kong Coliseum with the largest revolving stage. On 17 February 2008, he held an "Aaron Kwok De Show Reel Extension Live" concert at the Hong Kong AsiaWorld Arena with the largest revolving stage measured at 10m x 9.44m and created a new entry for the Guinness Book of World Records.

=== Acting ===
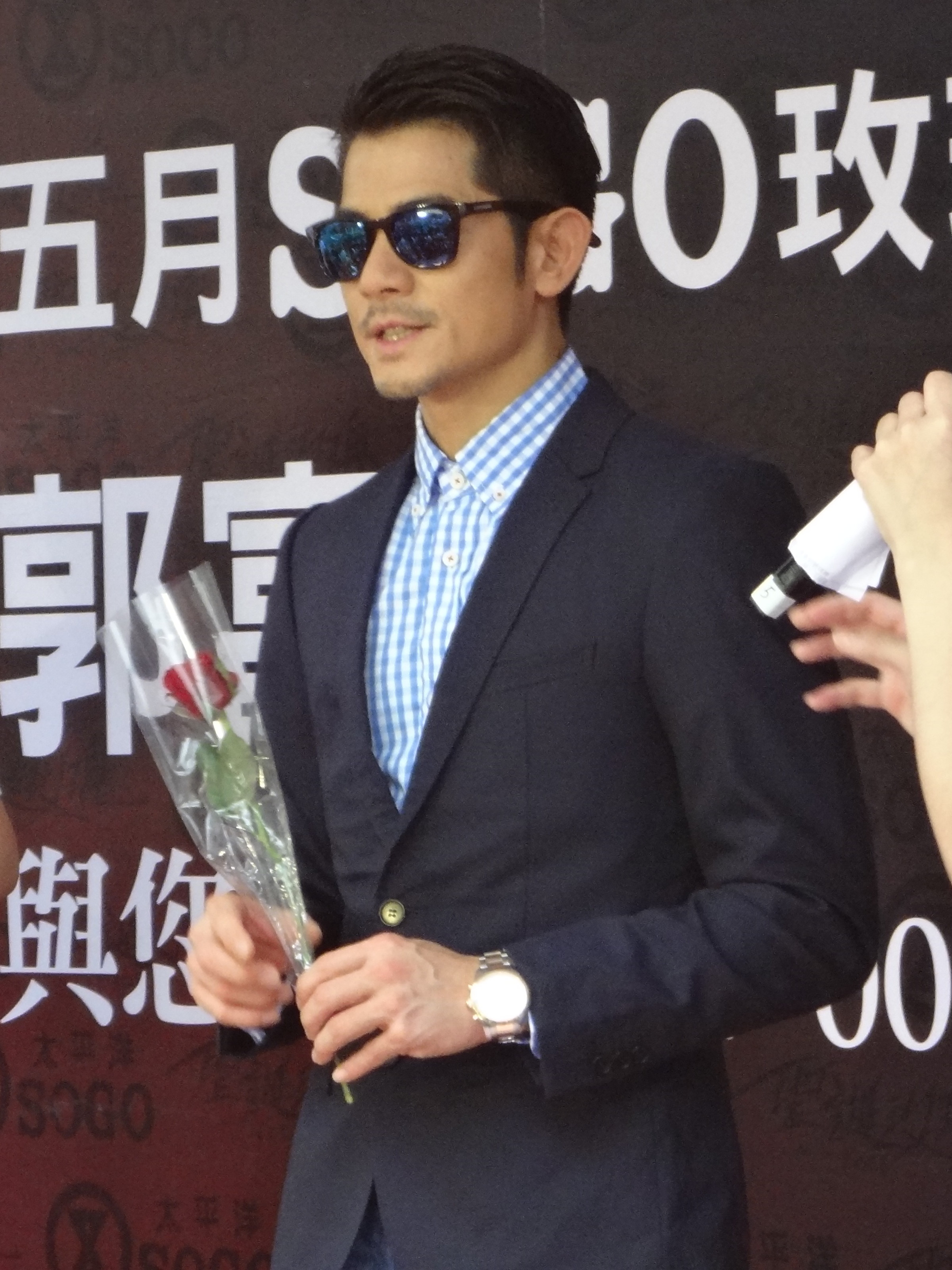
Kwok in Taipei in 2013

Over the years, Kwok has also been active in other media such as TV commercials and acting. He began his acting career with the TVB series Rise of Genghis Khan, and the 1988 series Twilight of a Nation about the Taiping Rebellion. One of his more noticeable role was for the 1996 TVB drama series Wars of Bribery where he plays an ICAC special-agent with Athena Chu.

He also starred in various movies. At the Taiwan's 42nd Golden Horse Awards ceremony on 13 November 2005, Kwok was the surprise winner of Best Leading Actor award for his role in the film Divergence. It was Kwok's first Golden Horse nomination and beat veteran Hong Kong star Tony Leung Ka-fai to win the honour. He won the Best Actor Award again at the 43rd Golden Horse Awards on 24 November 2006 for his role in the film After This Our Exile. He became only the second actor in the history of the Golden Horse Awards to win the Best Actor Award consecutively. Jackie Chan first accomplished this back in the 1992-3. Kwok gained acclaim for his role in the AIDS-themed film Love for Life, co-starring Zhang Ziyi, in 2010. In 2016, Kwok won his first Hong Kong Film Award for Best Actor for his role in the crime thriller film, Port of Call, at the 35th Hong Kong Film Awards.

== Personal life ==
=== Relationships ===
Kwok has been romantically linked with several models and celebrities, including Cecilia Yiu, Christy Chung, Athena Chu, Norika Fujiwara, Lynn Hung, and Amanda Strang. However, he never publicly confirmed any of these relationships. His longest-known relationship was purportedly with Lynn Hung, lasting from 2006 to 2013. When rumors of their breakup surfaced, Kwok stirred controversy by comparing women to shoes: "When a pair of shoes doesn't fit and makes your feet uncomfortable, you may want to switch to a more comfortable pair. Similarly, with a partner, you should find someone suitable. Forcing it will only lead to pain."

Kwok acknowledged his relationship with Chinese influencer and model Moka Fang in 2015. They married in Hong Kong in 2017. Later that year, Fang gave birth to their first daughter Chantelle. In 2019, she gave birth to their second daughter Charlotte. On 22 October 2025, Kwok announced the birth of his third daughter with Fang.

=== Hobbies ===
Kwok is a collector of supercars as well as a fan of motor racing. He is known as a car fanatic and has a large collection of notable cars. Some of his collections include the McLaren Senna, Pagani Zonda F, Ferrari F50, Enzo Ferrari, Ferrari FXX-K, Ferrari Testarossa, Ferrari F355, Ferrari 360, Ferrari 599 GTB Fiorano, Ferrari California, Ferrari F430 Spider, Lamborghini Diablo SE30, Lamborghini Murciélago, Lamborghini Gallardo, Lamborghini Aventador. Other cars include the Porsche 911 Turbo, Porsche 911 GT3 RS, Porsche 996 GT3, Porsche Cayenne, Mercedes-Benz SL600, Mercedes CLK DTM AMG, Audi R8 GT Spyder, Nissan GT-R and Zeekr 009.

In 2011, Kwok became a race-horse owner at the Hong Kong Jockey Club. He originally owned two horses: N288 Calling with Love and another named P288 My Favorite. In 2018, he purchased a new horse named C180 Dancing Fighter. Kwok is also well known to be a super fan of Chinese hotpot.

=== Image ===
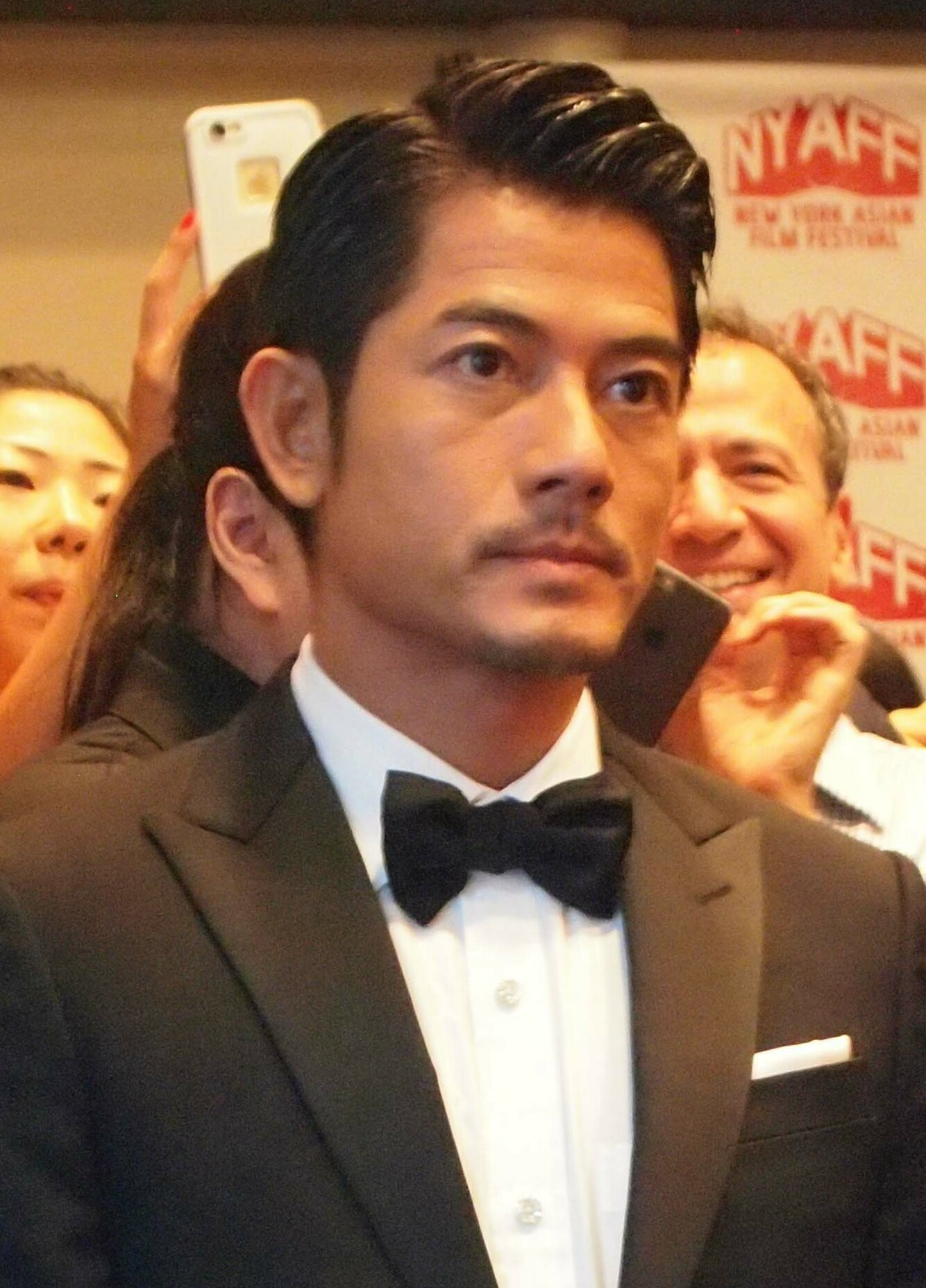
Kwok in 2015

He was famous for popularising a new type of "center-split hair style" that was widely imitated during the 1990s. As a fashion icon amongst the show biz industry, throughout his career he changed his hair style numerous times, including styles such as the five-five split and the four-six split. In 2020, he became the brand ambassador of HSBC Jade in Hong Kong with advertisements that shared his own beneficial experience of using its banking services.
