= Honda Elite =

The Honda Elite is a series of scooters manufactured by Honda since 1983. Honda currently makes the 108 cc (6.6 cu in) 2010 Elite.

== Elite 80 ==
In 1984, Honda released its first four-stroke modern scooter, the Elite 125. Later, Honda introduced the four-stroke Elite 80 (model code CH80) in 1985.

Production was moved from Japan to Mexico in 1991, and production ended in 2007. The Elite 80 had a 23 model year run with only minor changes.

== Elite 125/150 ==
Elite 150
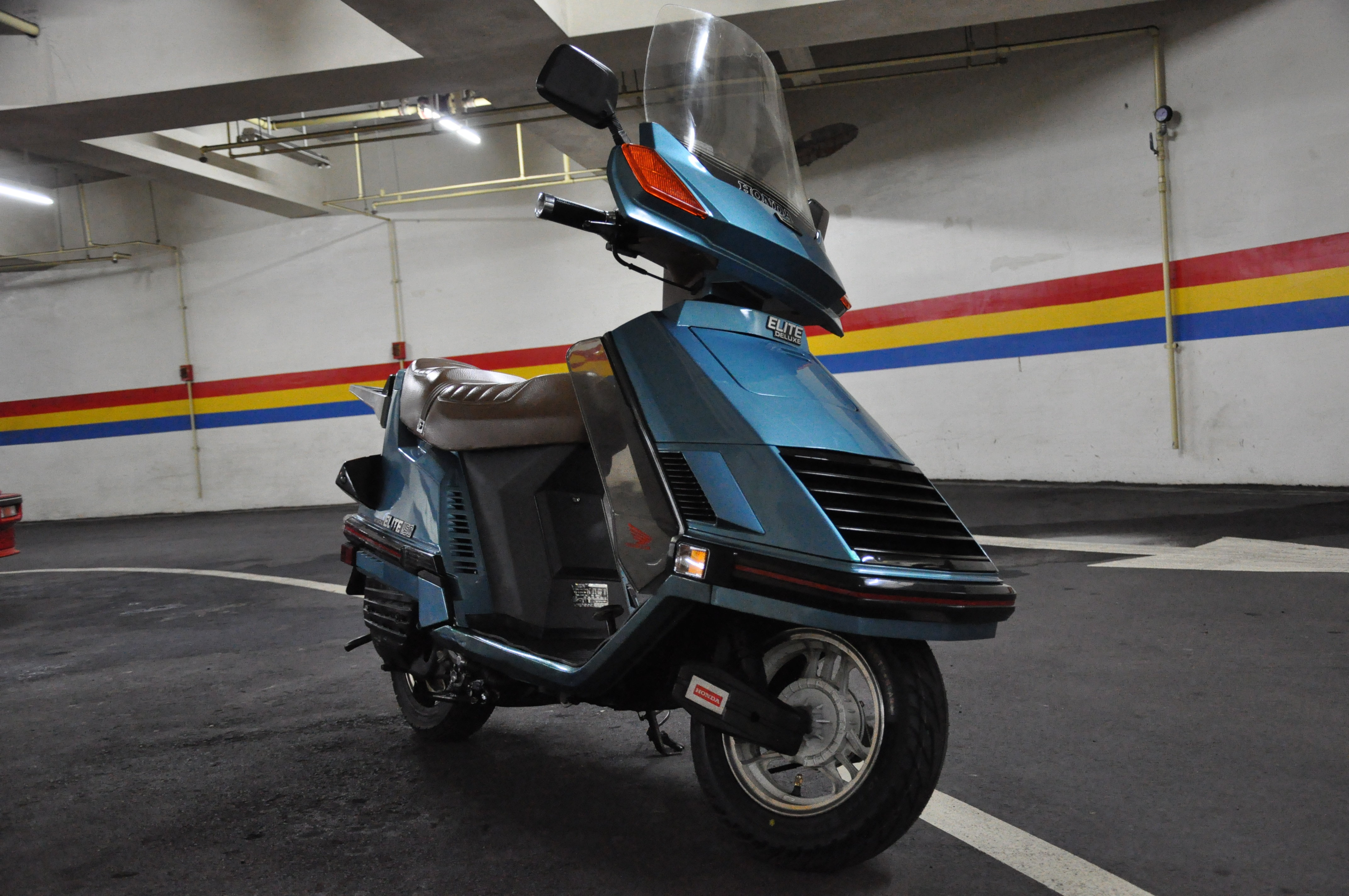
- Manufacturer: Honda
- Production: 1984–1987
- Class: Scooter
- Engine: 125 cc (7.6 cu in) / 153 cc (9.3 cu in), four stroke
- Transmission: Honda V-matic CVT
- Dimensions: L: 1,940 mm (76 in); W: 660 mm (26 in)
- Seat height: 760 mm (30 in)
- Weight: 102 kg (225 lb) (dry)
- Fuel capacity: 8.3 L (1.8 imp gal; 2.2 US gal)

Honda released its first mid-sized four-stroke scooter onto the western market in the spring of 1984. The Elite 125 (CH125) continued Honda's trend of shifting from two-stroke engines to the much more emissions friendly four-stroke engine. The Elite 125 was marketed in Japan as the Honda Spacy 125 Striker and in Europe as simply the Spacy 125. The 1984 Elite 125 featured many new technologies never before seen on a conventional scooter, such as a retractable headlamp, liquid-cooled engine, a digital dashboard, and more. Honda marketed this as "21st Century looks and features to match" and "the ultimate in commuter scooters"

During this period and others, Honda had been trying to carve out new niches in two wheel transport, much as they did with the Honda Cub. The last big success in scooters was the Piaggio Vespa, with its enclosed bodywork and ease of use being popular in the 50s and 60s. The CH125 appears to be intentionally futuristic by design, in line with the popularity of new affordable consumer technologies containing microchips and LCD screens. The contemporary competing models were the Yamaha 1982 Cygnus (XC180) and Yamaha 1984 Cygnus (XC125), which were sometimes known as Yamaha Riva/Beluga in certain markets and the Suzuki CS125.

For 1985, Honda brought back its mid-sized scooter along with some modifications that were unique to the North American market. Two of these changes were that the engine size was increased from 125 cc (7.6 cu in) to 153 cc (9.3 cu in) thus changing the model name to the Elite 150; this 150 variant was not offered in Europe and Japan (both which retained the 125cc engine) and is a specific upgrade for the North American market. The Elite 150 was now also to be sold in two editions, the standard model, and a deluxe model. The deluxe model (CH150D) shared an almost identical body and frame as the Elite 125, including a digital instrument cluster and flip-up headlamp, while the standard model (CH150) got a more conventional specification, including an analog dashboard, and a fixed headlamp.

1986 saw the elimination of the standard model Elite 150, leaving the Deluxe model as the only remaining mid-sized scooter Honda had to offer. Styling revisions for the Honda CH150 in 1987 included a transition from a boxy to a curvier, more rounded look. Although its appearance differed from its predecessor, the revised Elite 150 received few mechanical modifications. Despite the design changes the CH150 received in 1987, it was the last year this model was produced.

The Elite CH125/CH150 technical feature focused around ease of use (albeit there is no real under seat storage) and maintenance. Some of these would not be seen again on small scooters for some time, if at all. These include;

- Retractable headlamp- A world first for a scooter, this seemingly over complicated feature solved the aesthetic problem of a large headlight
- LCD- Another first, the LCD Speedo was quick and accurate, with a volt meter, fuel gauge and temperature gauge completing the main display. The trip meter also has an oil change timer (reset by inserting key into hole in the rectangular hole below the dash) linked to the odometer, which changes from green to red when due. There is also a digital clock powered independently with batteries hidden under the slotted panel adjacent on the left.
- Foot Warmer- Heat from the radiator can be diverted and vented over your feet. These vents can also be closed if you choose.
- Liquid cooled engine- Small displacement scooters of the period were air cooled. The previous year Honda introduced a 50cc liquid cooled two stroke scooter call the Honda Beat. The CH125 liquid cooled motor is quieter and is also electric start only. The engine is very under-stressed (aiding reliability), with the 49.5mm stroke piston having only 12.4 m/s at peak power (7,500rpm), so appears to be suited to sustained high speed running and comparable to piston aircraft engines (Lycoming O-360 is 10 m/s). Most sporty engines are between 18 and 22 m/s
- Aircooled Drive Belt- although not a new technology, this scooter avoids the problem of water ingesting (from rain or puddles) and dirt by piping the inlet air from the glove box and through the frame tubing under the floor, ending in the variator cover.
- Eccentric Rocker arm shaft Valve adjustment- this allows valve clearance to be adjusted externally, without having to create access into the camshaft area, similar to later Honda TR200 ATV. The advantage is not only time saved, but also no parts/shims or feeler gauges necessary.
- Integrated bumpers- the scooter in effect has integral bumpers, similar to the Yamaha XC180
- Bolt together wheel rims- also used by Piaggio to facilitate wheel changes, this at least made it easier for the home mechanic to replace tyres and less costly to replace if the drum brake wears out. The tyres are tubeless
- Foot Brake/Parking brake- The engine can only be started when the brake is on and makes parking on hills more secure.
- Anti-Dive suspension- the front bottom link suspension, when braking, creates forces that extend the front suspension at the same time weight is shifting forwards trying to compress it. This results in a significant reduction in brake dive.

The Honda Elite CH125/CH150 was ridden on screen by Linda Hamilton in the 1984 sci-fi thriller movie The Terminator. At around this same time, musicians Adam Ant and Grace Jones appeared in a series of television commercials promoting the Elite.

== Elite E ==
Honda Elite E
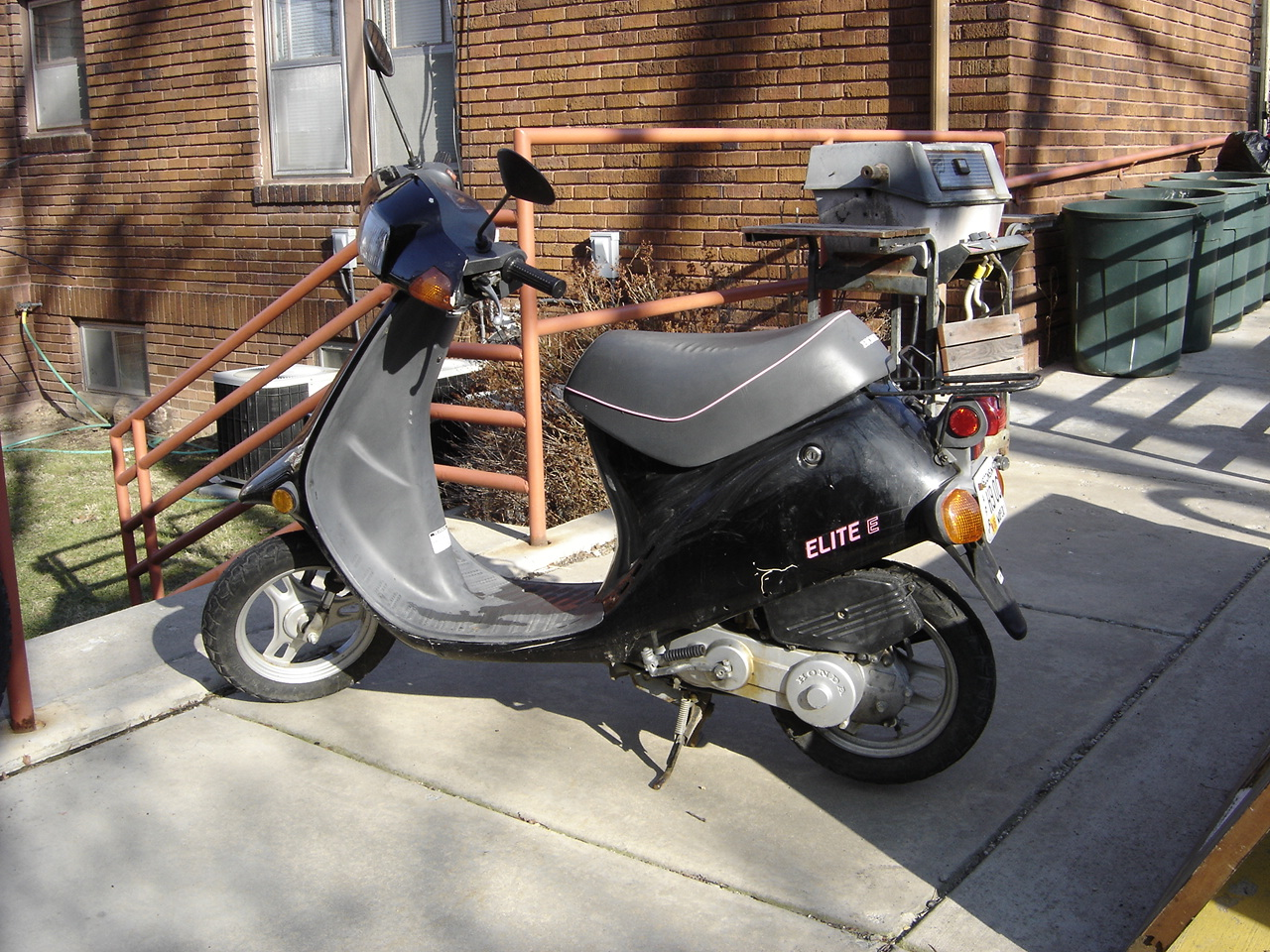
- Manufacturer: Honda
- Production: 1980s
- Class: Scooter
- Engine: 49 cc (3.0 cu in) two stroke
- Transmission: Fixed ratio rubber belt
- Dimensions: L: 1,545 mm (60.8 in); W: 650 mm (26 in)
- Weight: 49 kg (108 lb) (dry)
- Fuel capacity: 3.8 L (0.84 imp gal; 1.0 US gal) (1 Gallon)

The 49 cc (3.0 cu in) Honda Elite E was launched in the late 1980s. The Elite E shares the fixed-ratio transmission with its cousin the Honda Spree, rather than the CVT of the standard Elite and Dio models.

== Elite ES (SB50) ==
In 1988, Honda launched the SB50 as a successor to the Spree (NQ50), which was quite popular at the time. Although the SB50 shares some design elements with the larger Elite SR/LX (SA50) scooter, which was also released in 1988, the two models are almost entirely distinct. Despite the similar appearance, the SB50 is considerably smaller than the Elite SR/LX, and its body panels are not interchangeable. Furthermore, the SB50 features a distinct engine, frame, suspension, and other components, combining elements of Honda's Spree engine with a miniaturized version of the Elite SR/LX style.
