= Aka Chio =

Hong Kong singer

Aka Chio 趙慧珊
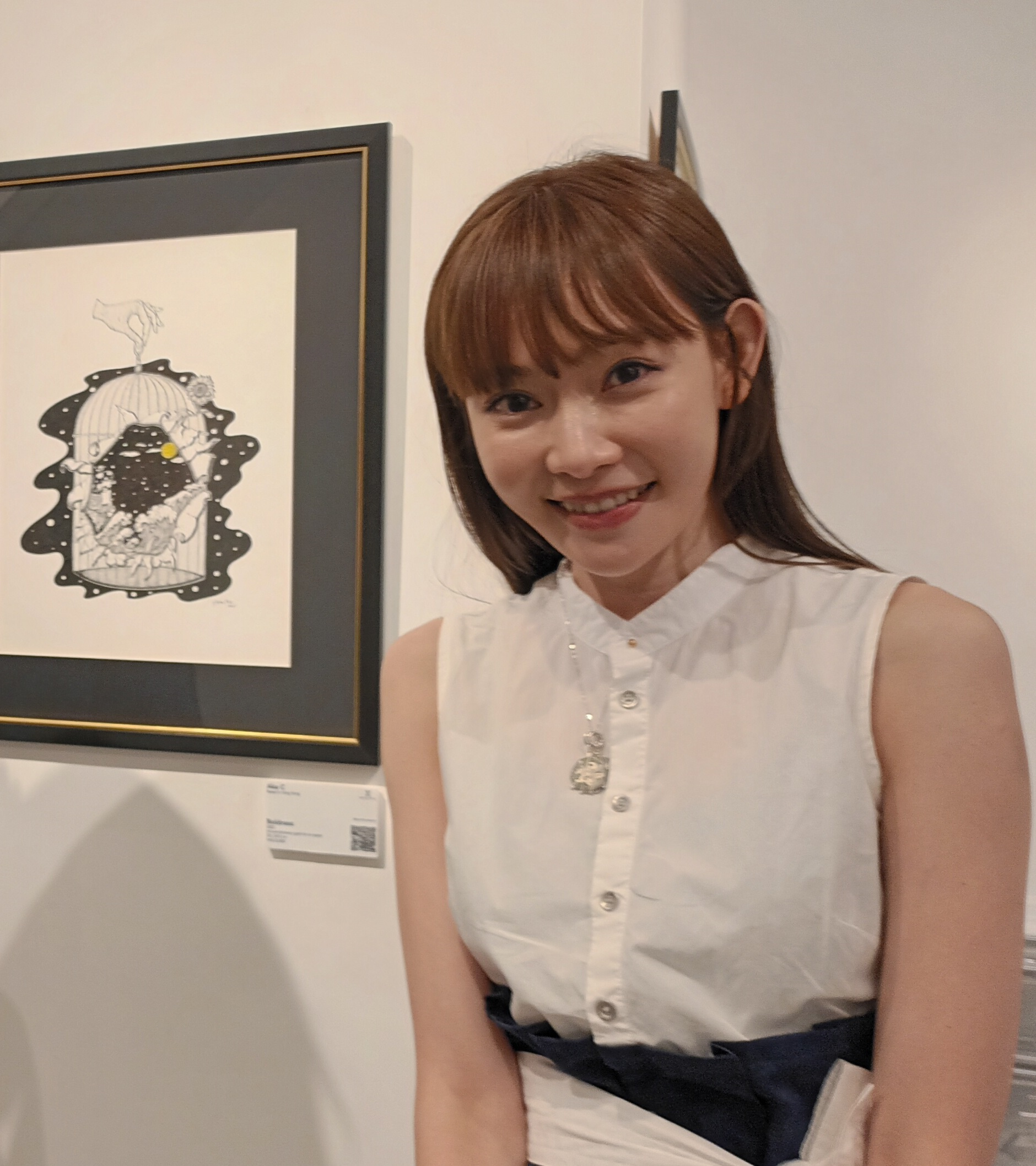
- Chio in 2023
- Born: February 15, 1987 (age 39)
- Education: Hong Kong Institute of Higher Education

Aka Chio Wai-san (Chinese: 趙慧珊) is a Hong Kong singer born in Macau.

== Biography ==
Chio attended Yau Ma Tei Catholic Primary School in her early years, and graduated from True Light Girls' School. Later, she attended Kowloon Tong School (Secondary Section) to pursue her university preparatory studies (British education). She later pursued an Associate of Graphic Design at the Hong Kong Institute of Higher Education (HKIEd).
