= Tai Po Sam Yuk Secondary School =

Co-educational Christian secondary school in Hong Kong

Coordinates: 22.4542°N 114.1590°E

- 大埔三育中學

Location
- 2 Tai Po Tau Drive; Tai Po; New Territories; Hong Kong

Information
- School type: Direct Subsidy Scheme
- Motto: 止於至善 (Strive for Excellence)
- Denomination: Seventh-day Adventist
- Established: 1956; 70 years ago
- Principal: Lawrence Cheong Ning Yu
- Chaplain: Pastor Lin
- Faculty: 64
- Gender: Co-educational
- Enrolment: 1,039
- Education system: Hong Kong Examinations and Assessment Authority
- Campus size: 6000m^{2}
- Campus type: Urban
- Accreditation: Adventist Accrediting Association
- Website: www.tpsy.edu.hk/

Tai Po Sam Yuk Secondary School
- Traditional Chinese: 大埔三育中學
- Simplified Chinese: 大埔三育中学
Transcriptions
Standard Mandarin
- Hanyu Pinyin: Dàbù Sān Yù Zhōngxué
Yue: Cantonese
- Jyutping: daai6 bou3 saam1 juk6 zung1 hok6

Tai Po Sam Yuk Secondary School ("TPSY" Chinese: 大埔三育中學) is a co-educational Christian secondary school, located in Tai Po, New Territories, Hong Kong. The school is owned and operated by the Seventh-day Adventist Church.

== History ==
The school was established and began teaching in 1956. In January 1960, the President of the South China Union Mission, EL Longway, reported that funds had been collected and were available for a new school to be built at Tai Po, at a projected cost of about HK$200,000. This was the first middle school ever to be established by any organization in the old market town of Tai Po. Tai Po was one of the first places where church evangelism was conducted in the early days, shortly after the pioneers established the Adventist church in Hong Kong. When the construction of the school began, the Tai Po church had grown to about 70 members.

== Facilities ==
All classrooms are air-conditioned with Internet access and digital projectors. There is a 300-square-metre library, a Physical Fitness Centre, a hall, a science (MML) Laboratory, a design (MML) Room, a campus TV station, four science laboratories, two computer rooms, a geography room, a music room, a home economics room, an art room, a Multi-Media Learning Centre, a Youth Centre and an elevator.

== See also ==
- List of Seventh-day Adventist secondary and elementary schools
- Seventh-day Adventist education
- Seventh-day Adventist Church
- Seventh-day Adventist theology
- History of the Seventh-day Adventist Church
- List of secondary schools in Hong Kong
