= Port of Call (2015 film) =

2015 Hong Kong film by Philip Yung

- Official film poster
- Traditional Chinese: 踏血尋梅
- Simplified Chinese: 踏血寻梅
- Hanyu Pinyin: Tà Xuè Xún Méi
- Jyutping: Daap6 Hyut3 Cam4 Mui4
- Directed by: Philip Yung
- Screenplay by: Philip Yung
- Produced by: Julia Chu
- Starring: Aaron Kwok; Elaine Jin; Patrick Tam
- Cinematography: Christopher Doyle
- Edited by: Philip Yung; Chu Ka-yat
- Music by: Ding Ke
- Production companies: Mei Ah Film Production; Golden Gate Productions
- Distributed by: Mei Ah Entertainment
- Release dates: 6 April 2015 (HKIFF); 3 December 2015
- Running time: 120 minutes
- Country: Hong Kong
- Language: Cantonese
- Budget: US$5 million
- Box office: US$1.25 million

Port of Call is a 2015 Hong Kong crime thriller film written, edited and directed by Philip Yung and starring Aaron Kwok as a veteran police detective who solving a murder mystery with unusual methods to prove his belief of virtue in human nature. The film is based on a real murder case where a dismembered corpse of a murdered 16-year-old female prostitute was found in Hong Kong in 2008. Port of Call was the closing film at the 39th Hong Kong International Film Festival on 6 April 2015. The film was theatrically released in Hong Kong on 3 December 2015. Port of Call won seven awards at the 35th Hong Kong Film Awards including acting awards Best Actor for Kwok, Best Actress for Jessie Li, Best Supporting Actress for Elaine Jin, Best Supporting Actor and Best New Performer, both for Michael Ning, as well as Best Screenplay and Best Cinematography, while also nominated for six other awards. The film also won many other awards and nominations at the Golden Horse Awards, Hong Kong Film Critics Society Awards and Asian Film Awards. It was selected as the Hong Kong entry for the Best Foreign Language Film at the 89th Academy Awards but it was not nominated.

== Cast ==
- Aaron Kwok as Detective Chong
- Elaine Jin as May
- Patrick Tam as Smoky
- Jessie Li as Wong Kai-mui/Wang Jiamei
- Michael Ning as Ting Chi-chung
- Jackie Cai as Mo-yung
- Maggie Shiu as Superintendent Law
- Eddie Chan as Policeman
- Hatou Yeung as Flora
- Ellen Li as Wang Jiali
- Don Li
- Ronny Yuen as Hoi
- Tam Ping-man as Wong Kai-mui's stepfather
- Noel Leung as Seung
- Tai Bo as Wong Kai-mui's father
- Chan Lai-wan

== Production ==
Filming for Port of Call began in Hong Kong on 1 September 2014 and wrapped up on 26 September. In order to prepare for his role as a grizzled veteran police detective, Aaron Kwok grew a moustache and beard, which, along with his hair, were dyed grey in colour, and also had to reduce his gym exercise routines.

== Release ==
Port of Call premiered as the closing film at the 39th Hong Kong International Film Festival on 6 April 2015 where the 120 minute director's cut version of the film was shown. The film was later theatrically released in Hong Kong on 3 December 2015 with two versions of the film being shown; the 120 minute director's cut version which was rated Category III, along with a 98 minute IIB-rated version.

== Awards and nominations ==
Awards and nominations
Ceremony	Category	Recipient	Outcome
35th Hong Kong Film Awards	Best Film	Port of Call	Nominated
35th Hong Kong Film Awards	Best Director	Philip Yung	Nominated
35th Hong Kong Film Awards	Best Actor	Aaron Kwok	Won
35th Hong Kong Film Awards	Best Actress	Jessie Li	Won
35th Hong Kong Film Awards	Best Supporting Actor	Michael Ning	Won
35th Hong Kong Film Awards	Best Supporting Actress	Elaine Jin	Won
35th Hong Kong Film Awards	Best New Performer	Michael Ning	Won
35th Hong Kong Film Awards	Best New Performer	Jessie Li	Nominated
35th Hong Kong Film Awards	Best Screenplay	Philip Yung	Won
35th Hong Kong Film Awards	Best Cinematography	Christopher Doyle	Won
35th Hong Kong Film Awards	Best Film Editing	Liao Ching-sung, Wong Hoi, Philip Yung, Chu Ka-yat	Nominated
35th Hong Kong Film Awards	Best Original Film Score	Ding Ke	Nominated
35th Hong Kong Film Awards	Best Original Film Song	Song: On the Dark Sea (漆黑的海上) Composer/Lyricist/Singer: Ding Ke	Nominated
52nd Golden Horse Awards	Best Feature Film	Port of Call	Nominated
52nd Golden Horse Awards	Best Original Screenplay	Philip Yung	Nominated
52nd Golden Horse Awards	Best Actor	Aaron Kwok	Nominated
52nd Golden Horse Awards	Best Supporting Actor	Michael Ning	Won
52nd Golden Horse Awards	Best Supporting Actress	Elaine Jin	Nominated
52nd Golden Horse Awards	Best New Performer	Jessie Li	Nominated
52nd Golden Horse Awards	Best New Performer	Michael Ning	Nominated
52nd Golden Horse Awards	Best Cinematography	Christopher Doyle	Nominated
52nd Golden Horse Awards	Best Original Film Song	Song: On the Dark Sea (漆黑的海上) Composer/Lyricist/Singer: Ding Ke	Nominated
22nd Hong Kong Film Critics Society Awards	Best Film	Port of Call	Won
22nd Hong Kong Film Critics Society Awards	Best Director	Philip Yung	Nominated
22nd Hong Kong Film Critics Society Awards	Best Screenplay	Philip Yung	Nominated
22nd Hong Kong Film Critics Society Awards	Best Actor	Aaron Kwok	Nominated
22nd Hong Kong Film Critics Society Awards	Best Actor	Michael Ning	Won
22nd Hong Kong Film Critics Society Awards	Best Actress	Jessie Li	Won
10th Asian Film Awards	Best Screenwriter	Philip Yung	Nominated
10th Asian Film Awards	Best Supporting Actor	Michael Ning	Nominated
10th Asian Film Awards	Best Newcomer	Jessie Li	Nominated
10th Asian Film Awards	Best Cinematographer	Christopher Doyle	Nominated
10th Asian Film Awards	Best Editor	Chu Ka-yat, Liao Ching-sung, Wong Hoi, Philip Yung	Won
19th Bucheon International Fantastic Film Festival	Best Actress	Jessie Li	Won
19th Bucheon International Fantastic Film Festival	Best of Bucheon	Philip Yung	Won
19th Bucheon International Fantastic Film Festival	Special Mention	Port of Cal	Won
7th Youth Film Handbook Chinese-language Film Awards	Top Ten Chinese-language films	Port of Call	Won
7th Youth Film Handbook Chinese-language Film Awards	Director of the Year	Philip Yung	Nominated
7th Youth Film Handbook Chinese-language Film Awards	Screenwriter of the Year	Philip Yung	Nominated
7th Youth Film Handbook Chinese-language Film Awards	Male Actor of the Year	Aaron Kwok	Won
7th Youth Film Handbook Chinese-language Film Awards	Best Supporting Actor	Michael Ning	Nominated
7th Youth Film Handbook Chinese-language Film Awards	Newcomer of the Year	Michael Ning	Nominated
7th Youth Film Handbook Chinese-language Film Awards	Newcomer of the Year	Jessie Li	Won
13th New York Asian Film Festival	Star Asia Award	Aaron Kwok	Won

== See also ==
- Aaron Kwok filmography
- List of Hong Kong Category III films
- List of submissions to the 89th Academy Awards for Best Foreign Language Film
- List of Hong Kong submissions for the Academy Award for Best Foreign Language Film
