= Karena Ng =

Hong Kong actress and model

- Chinese: 吳千語
- Born: Ng Yan-Yung 吳欣容; 27 October 1993 (age 32); Hangzhou, Zhejiang, China
- Other names: Wu Qian Yu, Ng Chin-yu
- Occupations: Actress, model
- Spouse: Brian Sze (m. 2023)

Karena Ng (born October 27, 1993) is a Hong Kong actress and model.

== Career ==
Ng started off in 2010 in an advertisement for Tempo tissue paper. In 2011, Ng started her acting career in the Hong Kong comedy Magic to Win directed by Wilson Yip. She was nominated for the Best New Performer award at the 31st Hong Kong Film Awards. More recently, she acted in Ip Man 3 as a single teacher Miss Wong.

In 2021, Kara Wai and Hugo Ng Doi-Yung starred in the movie "Sunshine of my life" as a blind parent of a normal child, played by Ng.

== Filmography ==
=== Films ===
Year	Title	Role	Notes
2022	Sunshine of My Life	Chu Tsz-yan	
2020	White War		
2019	Prison Flowers		
2019	Exorcism Master 2		
2019	Chronicles of the Nine Heavens		
2018	When Sun Meets Moon		
2018	Legend of the Ancient Sword	Ah Ruan	
2017	Exorcism Master		
2016	Bounty Hunters	Swan	
2015	Wong Ka Yan	Wong Ka Yan	
2015	Ip Man 3	Miss Wong (Teacher)	
2015	An Inspector Calls	Sherry Kau	
2014	Kung Fu Angels	-	
2013	Hotel Deluxe	Marilyn	
2013	Baby Blues	Trinket	
2012	All's Well Ends Well 2012	Chu Siu-min, Carmen	
2012	Love is... Pyjamas	Karena Yam	
2011	Magic to Win	Ching Mei-si, Macy Cheng	
