= Keeper of Darkness =

2015 Hong Kong film by Nick Cheung

- Film poster
- Traditional Chinese: 陀地驅魔人
- Simplified Chinese: 陀地驱魔人
- Hanyu Pinyin: Tuó Dì Qū Mó Rén
- Jyutping: To4 Dei2 Keoi1 Mo1 Jan4
- Directed by: Nick Cheung
- Screenplay by: Yeung Sin-ling
- Produced by: Claudie Chung; Law Chi-leung; Cheung Chi-kwong
- Starring: Nick Cheung; Amber Kuo; Louis Cheung; Sisley Choi; Xing Yu; Philip Keung; Karena Lam
- Cinematography: Chan Chi-ying
- Edited by: Fire Lee
- Music by: Mark Lui
- Production companies: One Cool Film Production; United Filmmakers Organisation (UFO)
- Distributed by: Edko Films
- Release date: 26 November 2015
- Running time: 103 minutes
- Country: Hong Kong
- Languages: Cantonese; Mandarin
- Box office: HK$15.9 million

Keeper of Darkness is a 2015 Hong Kong supernatural horror film directed by and starring Nick Cheung. The film co-stars Amber Kuo, Louis Cheung, Sisley Choi, Xing Yu and Philip Keung, with a special appearance by Karena Lam. It was released on 26 November 2015.

== Plot ==
Street-smart exorcist Fatt has a unique method of dealing with vengeful spirits: He negotiates with them and persuades them to let go of their grudges. After recordings of his exorcisms go viral, Fatt attracts the attentions of a murderous spirit who’s targeting mediums, as well as a troublesome reporter who takes great interest in Fatt and his close relationship with a female spirit.

== Cast ==
- Nick Cheung
- Amber Kuo
- Louis Cheung
- Sisley Choi
- Xing Yu
- Philip Keung

=== Special appearance ===
- Karena Lam

=== Cameo appearance ===
- Olivia Yan
- Lawrence Ng
- Angie Cheong
- Andrew Lau
- Susan Tse
- Emotion Cheung
- Elena Kong
- Ben Wong
- Chin Ka-lok
- Shawn Yue
- Deep Ng
- Jacky Cheung

== Reception ==
The film was number-one on its opening weekend in Hong Kong, with HK$5.75 million. The following weekend it grossed HK$3.80 million and stayed at number-one. On the third weekend it grossed HK$2.29 million and was number-two behind Point Break.

== Awards and nominations ==
Awards and nominations
| Ceremony | Category | Recipient | Outcome |
|---|---|---|---|
| 35th Hong Kong Film Awards | Best Actor | Nick Cheung | Nominated |
| 35th Hong Kong Film Awards | Best Supporting Actor | Louis Cheung | Nominated |
| 35th Hong Kong Film Awards | Best New Performer | Sisley Choi | Nominated |
| 35th Hong Kong Film Awards | Best Sound Design | Kinson Tsang, George Lee | Nominated |
| 35th Hong Kong Film Awards | Best Visual Design | Enoch Chan, Felix Lai | Nominated |
| 35th Hong Kong Film Awards | Best New Director | Nick Cheung | Nominated |
| 22nd Hong Kong Film Critics Society Awards | Best Actor | Nick Cheung | Nominated |
| 22nd Hong Kong Film Critics Society Awards | Film of Merit | Keeper of Darkness | Won |

== See also ==
- List of ghost films
- List of Hong Kong films
