= Jason Snell (visual effects artist) =

American special effects supervisor

Jason H. Snell is an American special effects supervisor known for his works in Disney's visual effects company Industrial Light & Magic (ILM). Snell has worked as a production coordinator and VFX supervisor in films, Men in Black (1997), Pirates of the Caribbean (film series) (2003-07), Star Wars: Episode III – Revenge of the Sith (2005), Indiana Jones and the Kingdom of the Crystal Skull (2008), Battleship (2012), Star Trek Into Darkness (2013), Tomorrowland (2015), Monster Hunt (2015), Deepwater Horizon (2016), Silence (2016) and Monster Hunt 2 (2018).

For Deepwater Horizon, he received critical acclaim and an Academy Award for Best Visual Effects nomination at the 89th Academy Awards.
