= Office (2015 Hong Kong film) =

2015 Hong Kong-Chinese film by Johnnie To

- Film poster

Chinese name
- Traditional Chinese: 華麗上班族
- Simplified Chinese: 华丽上班族
Transcriptions
Standard Mandarin
- Hanyu Pinyin: Huá Lì Shàng Bān Zú
Yue: Cantonese
- Jyutping: Waa4 Lai6 Seong2 Baan1 Zeok6
- Directed by: Johnnie To
- Screenplay by: Sylvia Chang
- Based on: Design for Living by Sylvia Chang
- Produced by: Johnnie To; Sylvia Chang
- Starring: Chow Yun-fat; Sylvia Chang; Eason Chan; Tang Wei
- Cinematography: Cheng Siu-Keung
- Edited by: David Richardson
- Music by: Lo Tayu; Keith Chan Fai-young
- Production companies: Edko Films; Beijing Hairun Pictures; Zhejiang Unique Media; LeVision Pictures; Sun Entertainment Culture; Media Asia Films; Milkyway Image; China Movie Channel; IQIYI Motion Pictures; Huaxia Film Distribution
- Distributed by: Edko Films
- Release dates: 2 September 2015 (China); 24 September 2015 (Hong Kong)
- Running time: 117 minutes
- Countries: Hong Kong; China
- Languages: Cantonese; Mandarin

Office is a 2015 musical comedy-drama film produced and directed by Johnnie To and starring Chow Yun-fat, Sylvia Chang, Eason Chan and Tang Wei. A Hong Kong-Chinese co-production, the film is an adaptation of the 2008 play Design for Living, which was created by and starred Chang. Office premiered at the 2015 Toronto International Film Festival and was theatrically released in China on 2 September 2015 and in Hong Kong in 3D on 24 September 2015.

== Plot ==
Billion-dollar company Jones & Sunn is going public. Chairman Ho Chung-ping (Chow Yun-fat) has promised CEO Winnie Cheung (Sylvia Chang), who has been his mistress for more than twenty years, that she will become a major shareholder of the company. As the IPO team enters the company to audit its accounts, a series of inside stories starts to be revealed.

Lee Xiang (Wang Ziyi), a new hire at Jones & Sunn, brings with him youthful ideals and dreams. Within the neoliberal market, the logic of intrigue rules, complicated by entanglements of love-hate relationships, which weaves a power play and a pathos-laden tragedy inside the office.

== Cast ==
- Chow Yun-fat as Ho Chung-ping (何仲平)
- Sylvia Chang as Winnie Cheung (張威)
- Eason Chan as David Wong (王大偉)
- Tang Wei as Sophie (蘇菲)
- Wang Ziyi as Lee Xiang (李想)
- Lang Yueting as Kat Ho (何琪琪)
- Cheung Siu-fai as John Suen (孫強)
- Tien Hsin as Ka-ling (嘉玲)
- Timmy Hung as Howard (浩浩)
- Stephanie Che as Ban-ban (班班)
- Mickey Chu as Shum Hoi (沈凱)
- Mimi Kung as Mrs. Ho (何太太)
- Lo Hoi-pang as Jones & Sunn security guard

== Critical reception ==
Office has received positive reviews. Manohla Dargis of The New York Times refers it as "One of the best-directed movies that you can see in New York right now". Ignatiy Vishnevetsky of The A.V. Club gave the film a score of B+ praising the film as dazzling and highlighting director Johnnie To's cutting movement and stunningly composed figures. Tom Huddleston of Time Out gave the film a score of 5 out of 5 stars praising its stylish dance and song sequences, catchy lyrics and its screenplay by Sylvia Chang as a keenly observed, spiky treatise on office politics.

James Marsh of Twitch Film gave the film a mixed review praising the imagination that the staging captures, but criticising the lack of development of Hong Kong's working development and director To's lack of vision and clear intent. Clarence Tsui of The Hollywood Reporter praises the film's lavish decorations and technical accomplishments, but criticizes its simplistic screenplay and being unfocused, with little development of the relationships between the characters.

== Awards and nominations ==
Awards and nominations
Ceremony	Category	Recipient	Outcome
35th Hong Kong Film Awards	Best Actress	Sylvia Chang	Nominated
35th Hong Kong Film Awards	Best Art Direction	William Chang, Alfred Yau	Won
35th Hong Kong Film Awards	Best Makeup & Costume Design	William Chang, Lui Fung-shan	Nominated
35th Hong Kong Film Awards	Best Sound Design	David Richardson, Andrew Tuason, Wu Shu-yao	Nominated
35th Hong Kong Film Awards	Best Visual Design	Ken Law, Tommy Cheung	Nominated
35th Hong Kong Film Awards	Best Original Film Score	Lo Tayu, Keith Chan Fai-young	Won
52nd Golden Horse Awards'	Best Actress	Sylvia Chang	Nominated
52nd Golden Horse Awards'	Best Adapted Screenplay	Sylvia Chang	Nominated
52nd Golden Horse Awards'	Best Art Direction	William Chang, Alfred Yau	Won
52nd Golden Horse Awards'	Best Makeup & Costume Design	William Chang, Lui Fung-shan	Nominated
52nd Golden Horse Awards'	Best Original Film Song	Song: Why Bother (何必呢) Composer: Lo Tayu; Lyricist: Lin Xi; Singer: Eason Chan	Nominated
52nd Golden Horse Awards'	Best Sound Effects	Andrew Tuason, Wu Shu-yao, David Richardson	Nominated
22nd Hong Kong Film Critics Society Awards	Best Film	Office	Nominated
22nd Hong Kong Film Critics Society Awards	Best Director	Johnnie To	Nominated
22nd Hong Kong Film Critics Society Awards	Best Actress	Sylvia Chang	Nominated
22nd Hong Kong Film Critics Society Awards	Film of Merit	Office	Won
