= Philip Yung =

Hong Kong director

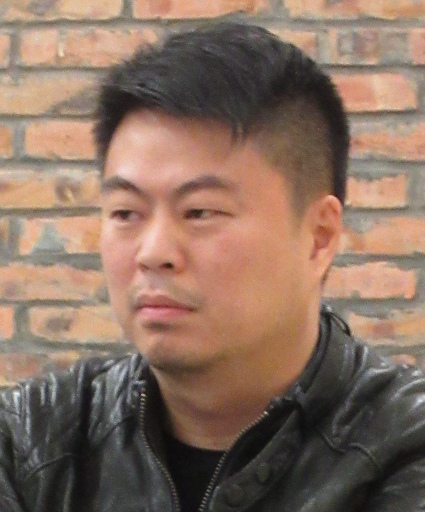
- Yung in December 2017
- Occupation: Filmmaker

Chinese name
- Chinese: 翁子光
Transcriptions
Standard Mandarin
- Hanyu Pinyin: Wēng Zǐguāng

Philip Yung Tsz-kwong (Chinese: 翁子光) is a Hong Kong film director, screenwriter, and critic.

Yung won the Hong Kong Film Award for Best Screenplay at the 35th Hong Kong Film Awards for Port of Call (2015), and won Best Director at the 31st Hong Kong Film Critics Society Awards for Papa (2024).

== Early life ==
Philip Yung Tsz-kwong grew up in a self-described "lower-class environment".

== Career ==
Prior to his work as a filmmaker, Yung was a film critic.

He made his feature film debut with Glamorous Youth (2009) followed by May We Chat (2013).

His third feature Port of Call (2015), a crime thriller about a detective with eccentric methods, was nominated for and won several awards at various Asian award ceremonies, including the 35th Hong Kong Film Awards, the 52nd Golden Horse Awards, and the 19th Bucheon Film Awards. Yung personally won the Best of Bucheon Award at the Bucheon Film Awards and Best Screenplay at the Hong Kong Film Awards.

His next feature Where the Wind Blows is a period crime thriller about corrupt cops in 1960s Hong Kong. Inspired by his grandmother's stories about Old Hong Kong, Yung filmed for around three months beginning in November 2017 what was then entitled Theory Of Ambitions. According to Apple Daily, the film was set to premiere at the end of 2018 but was blocked by the mainland's National Radio and Television Administration due to its subject matter. The film was again scheduled to open at the Hong Kong International Film Festival in April 2021 before being withdrawn due to unspecified "technical reasons", what critics say is a shorthand for censorship by the mainland.

== Filmography ==
| Year | Film | Director | Writer | Notes/Ref. |
|---|---|---|---|---|
| 2009 | Glamorous Youth | Yes | Yes | |
| 2013 | May We Chat | Yes | Yes | |
| 2013 | Rigor Mortis | No | Yes | With Jill Leung and Juno Mak |
| 2014 | As the Light Goes Out | No | Yes | With Derek Kwok and Jill Leung |
| 2015 | Port of Call | Yes | Yes | |
| 2019 | Fatal Visit | No | Yes | Script by |
| 2023 | Where the Wind Blows | Yes | Yes | |
| 2024 | Penny Pinchers | Yes | No | |
| 2024 | Papa | Yes | Yes | |
| 2026 | Cyclone | Yes | Yes | With Carmen Hau and Thomas Leung Wing-ho |

== Accolades ==
Awards and nominations
| Ceremony | Nominated Work | Category | Outcome | Notes |
|---|---|---|---|---|
| 29th Hong Kong Film Awards | Glamorous Youth | Hong Kong Film Award for Best New Director | Nominated | |
| 35th Hong Kong Film Awards | Port of Call | Best Director | Nominated | |
| 35th Hong Kong Film Awards | Port of Call | Best Screenplay | Won | |
| 35th Hong Kong Film Awards | Port of Call | Best Film Editing | Nominated | with Liao Ching-sung, Wong Hoi, Chu Ka-yat |
| 52nd Golden Horse Awards | Port of Call | Best Original Screenplay | Nominated | |
| 10th Asian Film Awards | Port of Call | Best Screenwriter | Nominated | |
| 10th Asian Film Awards | Port of Call | Best Editing | Nominated | with Liao Ching-sung, Wong Hoi, Chu Ka-yat |
| 31st Hong Kong Film Critics Society Awards | Papa | Best Director | Won | |
| 43rd Hong Kong Film Awards | Papa | Best Director | Nominated | |
| 43rd Hong Kong Film Awards | Papa | Best Screenplay | Nominated | |

== Word by Word ==
Word by Word Limited (Chinese: 一劇之本有限公司) is a film production company founded in 2014 by Yung and screenwriter Effy Sun, in collaboration with the Beijing-based company Dadi Century. It is headquartered in To Kwa Wan. Yung aimed to develop his own projects through the company, as well as fund and co-create films with new directors focusing on non-mainstream themes. The company's first project was the Chinese film Yolk Man (2019), directed by debut director Channing Huang and executive produced by Philip Yung. In August 2024, the company partnered with the Federation of Hong Kong Filmmakers to co-launch a program to recruit screenwriting apprentices.

=== Films produced ===
- Yolk Man (2019)
- The Sparring Partner (2022)
- Papa (2024)
- Cyclone (2026)
