= Michael Ning =

Hong Kong actor (born 1979)

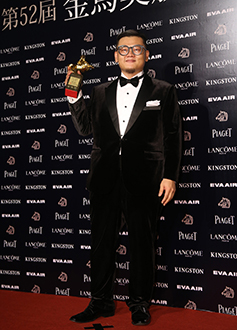
- Ning in 2015
- Born: 5 November 1979 (age 46); Hong Kong
- Awards: Hong Kong Film Awards – Best Supporting Actor; 2016 Port of Call Golden Horse Awards – Best Supporting Actor; 2016 Port of Call

Chinese name
- Traditional Chinese: 凌智豪
Transcriptions
Standard Mandarin
- Hanyu Pinyin: líng zhì háo
Yue: Cantonese
- Jyutping: ling4 zi3 hou4

Michael Ning Chi-ho (Chinese: 凌智豪; Jyutping: ling4 zi3 hou4, born 5 November 1979), known professionally as Bak Ji (白只), (Note: Jyutping: baak6 zi2, Pinyin: bái zhī) is a Hong Kong actor best known for his role in the 2015 film Port of Call.

== Filmography ==
Year	Film	Role	Ref.
2015	Port of Call	Ting Tsz-Chung	
2017	Zombiology: Enjoy Yourself Tonight	Lung	
2017	The White Girl	The Village Chief	
2018	Concerto of the Bully		
2018	Agent Mr Chan		
2019	I Love You, You're Perfect, Now Change!		
2019	Ciao UFO	Uncle (表舅父)	
2021	Anita	Michael Lai	
2023	Where the Wind Blows	Fat-Bee	
2023	One More Chance		
2023	The Goldfinger	Yam Chung	
2024	The Moon Thieves	Mario	
2024	The Last Dance	Lai	
