= List of Hong Kong films of 2026 =

List of Films

This article lists feature-length Hong Kong films theatrically released in 2026.

== Releases ==
Opening		Title	Director	Cast	Genre	Ref.
J A N	15	Finch & Midland	Timothy Yeung	Anthony Wong, Patrick Tam, Harriet Yeung, Theresa Lee, Nina Paw	Drama	
J A N	29	Mother Bhumi	Chong Keat-aun	Fan Bingbing, Natalie Hsu, Bai Run-yin, Pearlly Chua	Drama	
F E B	17					
F E B	17	Blades of the Guardians	Yuen Woo-ping	Wu Jing, Nicholas Tse, Yu Shi, Jet Li	Martial arts, wuxia	
F E B	17	Night King	Jack Ng	Dayo Wong, Sammi Cheng	Comedy	
F E B	17	The Snowball on a Sunny Day	Philip Yung	Elaine Jin, Chung Suet Ying, Edan Lui, Jiro Lee, Harriet Yeung	Comedy	
M A R	5	Ultimate Revenge	Terry Ng	Alex Fong, Ray Lui, Louis Cheung, Andy On, Carlos Chan, German Cheung	Action, crime	
M A R	5	Girlfriends	Tracy Choi	Fish Liew, Jennifer Yu, Elizabeth Tang, Natalie Hsu	Romance	
M A R	12	Gamer Girls	Veronica Bassetto, Sophie Yang	Angela Yuen, Alma Kwok, Sabrina Cheung, Ng Wing-sze, Jeannie Ng, CY Chan	Drama	
M A R	19	Ciao UFO	Patrick Leung	Chui Tien You, Charlene Choi, Wong You Nam	Drama	
A P R	3	We're Nothing At All	Herman Yau	Patrick Tam, Anson Kong, Ansonbean	Thriller	
A P R	16	Night King (Director's cut)	Jack Ng	Dayo Wong, Sammi Cheng	Comedy	
M A Y	1	Cold War 1994	Longman Leung	Daniel Wu, Terrance Lau, Wu Kang-ren, Chow Yun-fat, Aaron Kwok, Louis Koo, Tony Leung Ka-fai, Tse Kwan-ho, Louise Wong, Fish Liew	Crime, thriller	
M A Y	16	A Man and a Woman	Guan Hu	Huang Bo, Ni Ni	Drama	
J U N	3	Man on the Edge	Sam Wong	Richie Jen, Simon Yam, Alex Fong, Patrick Tam, Ron Ng	Crime	
J U N	11	823 Hostage Crisis	Tony Leung	Fish Liew, Tong Bing-yu, Zhang Yaodong, Law Lan, Don Li	Christian drama	
J U N	12	The Furious	Kenji Tanigaki	Mo Tse, Joe Taslim, Yang Enyou, Jeeja Yanin, Brian Le, Joey Iwanaga, Yayan Ruhian	Action	
J U N	18	Dog Day Evening	Mak Tin-shu	Michael Ning, Mak Pui-tung, Rachel Leung, Yukki Tai, Fish Liew, Tse Kwan-ho, Nina Paw	Drama	
J U L	4	Unidentified Murder	Kwok Ka-hei, Jack Lee	Ling Man-lung, Renci Yeung, Ronald Lam, Peter Chan, Kenny Wong	Mystery	
A U G	13	Kung Fu Soccer	Stephen Chow	Zhang Xiaofei, Lay Zhang, Dilraba Dilmurat, Zhao Lina, Li Jiayue, Ai Mi	Sports	
A U G	21	The Dating Menu	Amos Why	Siuyea Lo, Renci Yeung, Rachel Leung, Kearen Pang, Crystal Cheung	Romance	
A U G	22	A Mighty Adventure	Toe Yuen	—N/a	Silent animation	
A U G	27	Wakesurf Lovers	Fung Chih-chiang	Jeffrey Ngai, Renci Yeung, Kevin Chu, Henick Chou	Sports	
S E P	25	V	Han Yan	Zhu Yilong, Tan Jianci, Tony Leung Ka-fai, Michelle Wai	Heist	
O C T	2	Cyclone	Philip Yung	Li Yuqiao, Edwynn Li, Jenny Suen	Drama	
O C T	8	The Mage	Pang brothers	Josie Ho, Iman Taheri, German Cheung	Horror	
O C T	8	Mastermind	James Hung	Louis Koo, Simon Yam, Tse Kwan-ho, Ci Sha	Action	
O C T	15	Good Trip	Norris Wong	Nick Cheung, Chung Suet Ying	Drama	
O C T	23	Bird of Paradise	Wu Chui-yi	Catherine Chau, Elaine Jin, Peter Chan, Goofy Yeung, Jayden Cheung	Drama	
O C T	29	We Are Born Good	Yeung Leung-chuen	Yeung Wai-lun, Chung Suet Ying	Drama	
N O V	12	Afterpiece	Keane Wong	Stephen Fung, Myolie Wu, Angela Yuen, Chrissie Chau	Drama	
N O V	26	Spare Queens	Tommy Tom	Chrissie Chau, Stephy Tang, Anson Kong	Sports	
N O V	26	Queerpanorama	Jun Li	Jayden Cheung	Drama	

== Other films set to premiere in 2026 ==
Title	Director	Cast	Genre	Ref.
The Mage 2	Pang brothers	Josie Ho, Iman Taheri, Kent Cheng, Tse Kwan-ho	Horror	
Odium Zero	James Hung	Ali Lee, Simon Yam, Jeffrey Ngai, Amy Lo	Animated	
Raging Havoc	Derek Kwok	Andy Lau, Nicholas Tse	Action	
Secret in the Box	Frankie Tam	Zhang Songwen, Isabella Leong, Patrick Tam, Edan Lui	Mystery	
The Treasure	Ronald Cheng, Gordon Chan	Dayo Wong, Ronald Cheng, Fala Chen	Comedy	
The Trier of Fact	Tong Wai-hon	Louis Koo, Eddie Peng, Raymond Lam	Action	

== See also ==
- 2026 in Hong Kong
- List of 2026 box office number-one films in Hong Kong
- List of Hong Kong films of 2025
- 44th Hong Kong Film Awards
