= List of Hong Kong films of 2027 =

List of Films

This article lists feature-length Hong Kong films theatrically released in 2027.

== Releases ==
Opening		Title	Director	Cast	Genre	Ref.
J A N	TBA	The Return of Siu Luk	Herman Yau	Kitty Yuen, Lokman Yeung, Leung Chung-hang, Joe Wong Yiu-cho, Grace Wu Lai-ying, Melody Yuen Wan-shan, Simon Ngai Ping-long	Fantasy comedy	
F E B	4	Golden Blessings	Mak Ho Pong	Owen Cheung, Benjamin Yuen, Ruco Chan, Mandy Wong, Kent Cheng, Emily Kwan, Ha Yu, Shirley Chan, Stefan Wong, Andy Teh, Miko Wong	Romance comedy	

== TBA ==
Title	Director(s)	Cast	Genre	Ref.
New Rich and Auspicious	Lo Yiu-fai	Charlene Choi, Raymond Lam, Chloe So, Tony Wu, Deep Ng, Matthew Ho, Candy Chang	Comedy	
Cold War 1995	Longman Leung	Daniel Wu, Terrance Lau, Wu Kang-ren, Chow Yun-fat, Aaron Kwok, Louis Koo, Tony Leung Ka-fai, Tse Kwan-ho, Louise Wong, Fish Liew	Crime, thriller	
Kowloon Walled City: Final Chapter	Soi Cheang	Lam峯, Daniel Wu, Terrance Lau	Action	
Detective vs Sleuths 2	Wai Ka-fai	Lau Ching-wan, Charlene Choi, Lam峯	Action thriller	
Ten Medical Youths	Mabel Cheung	Josephine Koo, Jennifer Yu, Ng Chin-han	Drama	
1941	Teddy Chan, Chin Ka-lok, Wong Hoi	Jackie Chan, Donnie Yen, Jet Li, Wu Jing, Sammo Hung, Yuen Biao, Louis Koo, Nick Cheung, Daniel Wu, Charmaine Sheh, Andy Lau	Historical epic	

== See also ==
- 2027 in Hong Kong
- List of Hong Kong films of 2026
