= 42nd Hong Kong Film Awards =

2024 Hong Kong Film Awards

- Official poster
- Date: 14 April 2024
- Site: Hong Kong Cultural Centre; Tsim Sha Tsui, Hong Kong
- Organised by: Hong Kong Film Awards Association
- Official website: Hong Kong Film Awards

Highlights
- Best Film: A Guilty Conscience
- Best Director: Soi Cheang; Mad Fate
- Best Actor: Tony Leung Chiu-wai; The Goldfinger
- Best Actress: Jennifer Yu; In Broad Daylight
- Most awards: 6 — The Goldfinger
- Most nominations: 16 — In Broad Daylight

Television coverage
- Channel: ViuTV
- Network: HK Television Entertainment

The 42nd Hong Kong Film Awards (Chinese: 第42屆香港電影金像獎) was the 42nd edition of the Hong Kong Film Awards, which honored the best Hong Kong films of 2023. Presented by the Hong Kong Film Awards Association, it took place at Hong Kong Cultural Centre in Tsim Sha Tsui on 14 April 2024.

A Guilty Conscience won the award for Best Film, while Soi Cheang won his first Best Director award for his work on Mad Fate. The Goldfinger won the most awards at the ceremony with six, including Best Actor for Tony Leung Chiu-wai, who accepted the award by video.

== Winners and nominees ==
Nominees were announced on 8 February 2024.

Winners are listed first, highlighted in boldface, and indicated with a double dagger (‡).

**Best Film**: **A Guilty Conscience – Bill Kong and Ivy Ho, producers** ‡; In Broad Daylight – Derek Yee, producer; Time Still Turns the Pages – Derek Yee, producer; Mad Fate – Johnnie To, Yau Nai-hoi, and Elaine Chu, producers; The Goldfinger – Ronald Wong, producer	**Best Director**: **Soi Cheang – Mad Fate** ‡; Nick Cheuk – Time Still Turns the Pages; Felix Chong – The Goldfinger; Jack Ng – A Guilty Conscience; Lawrence Kan – In Broad Daylight
**Best Screenplay**: **Mad Fate – Melvin Li, Yau Nai-hoi** ‡; In Broad Daylight – Lawrence Kan, Li Cheuk-fung, Tong Chui-ping; Time Still Turns the Pages – Nick Cheuk; The Goldfinger – Felix Chong; A Guilty Conscience – Jack Ng, Jay Cheung, Terry Lam	**Best Actor**: **Tony Leung Chiu-wai – The Goldfinger** ‡; Bowie Lam – In Broad Daylight; Siuyea Lo – Time Still Turns the Pages; Dayo Wong – A Guilty Conscience; Dong Chengpeng – Dust to Dust
**Best Actress**: **Jennifer Yu – In Broad Daylight** ‡; Kay Tse – Band Four; Michelle Wai – Ready O/R Rot; Louise Wong – A Guilty Conscience; Chung Suet Ying – The Lyricist Wannabe	**Best Supporting Actor**: **David Chiang – In Broad Daylight** ‡; Sean Wong – Time Still Turns the Pages; Jiro Lee – Over My Dead Body; Wu Kang-ren – Fly Me to the Moon; Tse Kwan-ho – A Guilty Conscience
**Best Supporting Actress**: **Rachel Leung – In Broad Daylight** ‡; Elaine Jin – Ready O/R Rot; Rosa Maria Velasco – Time Still Turns the Pages; Renci Yeung – A Guilty Conscience; Fish Liew – A Guilty Conscience	**Best New Performer**: **Yoyo Tse – Fly Me to the Moon** ‡; Sabrina Ng – Say I Do To Me; Rondi Chan – Band Four; Hui Yuet-sheung – In Broad Daylight; Curtis Ho – Time Still Turns the Pages
**Best Cinematography**: **The Goldfinger – Anthony Pun** ‡; In Broad Daylight – Meteor Cheung; Time Still Turns the Pages – Meteor Cheung; Mad Fate – Cheng Siu-keung, To Hung Mo; I Did It My Way – Jason Kwan	**Best Film Editing**: **Mad Fate – Allen Leung, David Richardson** ‡; In Broad Daylight – Lo Wai Lun; Time Still Turns the Pages – Keith Chan Hiu-chun, Nick Cheuk; The Goldfinger – William Chang, Curran Pang; A Guilty Conscience – Chan Ki-hop
**Best Art Direction**: **The Goldfinger – Eric Lam** ‡; Back Home – Ceci Fok Pui Sze, Cheung Bing; In Broad Daylight – Albert Poon, Kate Tse; Time Still Turns the Pages – Irving Cheung; Mad Fate – Bruce Yu, Cat Leung	**Best Costume & Make Up Design**: **The Goldfinger – Man Lim Chung** ‡; In Broad Daylight – Albert Poon, Chan Hau Sin; Over My Dead Body – Stephanie Wong; Fly Me to the Moon – William Chang, Seven Dos Santos; Mad Fate – Bruce Yu, Karen Yip
**Best Action Choreography**: **Bursting Point – Stephen Tung** ‡; Sakra – Kenji Tanigaki, Yan Hwa; Mad Fate – Jack Wong; The White Storm 3: Heaven or Hell – Nicky Li; I Did It My Way – Chin Ka-lok	**Best Original Film Score**: **Band Four – Teddy Robin, Day Tai** ‡; In Broad Daylight – Chu Wan-pin; Time Still Turns the Pages – Hanz Au, Iris Liu, Jolyon Cheung; The Goldfinger – Day Tai; The Lyricist Wannabe – Wong Kin-wai
**Best Original Film Song**: **"A Lyricist Wannabe" from The Lyricist Wannabe** ‡; "Walking Alone" from Say I Do To Me; "If I Don't Remember" from Band Four; "A Touch of Daylight" from In Broad Daylight; "Let's Get To The Top" from The Goldfinger	**Best Visual Effects**: **The Goldfinger – Lik Wong, Benson Poon** ‡; Water, Back Home – Chan Tik Hoi; Mad Fate – Tommy Cheung, Edwin Chow Chi-ho, Chum Yin; Cyber Heist – Alex Lim Hung-fung, Jules Lin Chun-yue, Ho Man-lok, Yee Kwok-leung; Bursting Point – Yuan Huatang, Wang Xiqing, Dennis Yeung
**Best Sound Design**: **The Goldfinger – Nopawat Likitwong** ‡; In Broad Daylight – Chill Yang; Mad Fate – Thomas Cheng, Chill Yang; Dust to Dust – Dave Cheung; Bursting Point – Nip Kei Wing, Lam Siu Yu, Viola Chan	**Best New Director**: **Nick Cheuk – Time Still Turns the Pages** ‡; Lawrence Kan – In Broad Daylight; Sasha Chuk – Fly Me to the Moon; Jack Ng – A Guilty Conscience; Jonathan Li – Dust to Dust
**Best Asian Chinese Language Film**: **The Pig, The Snake and The Pigeon (Taiwan)** ‡; No More Bets (China); Abang Adik (Malaysia); Full River Red (China); Marry My Dead Body (Taiwan)
**Lifetime Achievement**: **Sammo Hung**	**Professional Achievement**: **Tong Ping**
