= Night King (film) =

2026 Hong Kong film by Jack Ng

- Theatrical release poster
- Traditional Chinese: 夜王
- Jyutping: Je^{6} Wong^{6}
- Directed by: Jack Ng
- Written by: Jack Ng; Ho Miu-ki; Jay Cheung
- Produced by: Bill Kong; Ivy Ho; Jack Ng
- Starring: Dayo Wong; Sammi Cheng
- Cinematography: Anthony Pun
- Edited by: Alan Cheng; Angie Lam
- Music by: Iris Liu; Hanz Au; Jolyon Cheung
- Production companies: Edko Films; Guava Pictures; Maoyan Entertainment
- Distributed by: Edko Films
- Release dates: 6 February 2026 (Galaxy Macau); 17 February 2026 (Hong Kong)
- Running time: 132 minutes
- Country: Hong Kong
- Language: Cantonese
- Budget: <HK$20 million
- Box office: HK$100 million

Night King (Chinese: 夜王) is a 2026 Hong Kong comedy film directed and co-written by Jack Ng. Starring Dayo Wong and Sammi Cheng, the film features an ensemble cast of returnees from Ng and Wong's A Guilty Conscience (2023), including Louise Wong, Fish Liew, Dee Ho, Renci Yeung, and Tse Kwan-ho. Set in 2012, the story takes place at Club EJ, the last-standing nightclub in Tsim Sha Tsui East, where its manager (Wong) and newly appointed CEO (Cheng) cooperate to prevent the nightclub from shutting down amidst industry decline.

Following the commercial success of A Guilty Conscience, the film was conceived during a celebratory dinner by the cast and crew. The screenplay was set as a comedy centered around Hong Kong nightclubs after co-writer Ho Miu-ki joined the project in 2024. Principal photography took place from June to September 2025, including location shoots in Macau. The film features a re-recorded version of Sammi Cheng's 1997 single "Everyone is a Superstar" as its theme song.

Night King had its world premiere at Galaxy Macau on 6 February 2026, followed by a theatrical release in Hong Kong on 19 February as a Chinese New Year film for the Year of the Horse. The film broke numerous box office records, including becoming the fourth Hong Kong film to reach the HK$100 million benchmark, and is currently the third-highest grossing Hong Kong film of all time.

== Plot ==
In 2012, most nightclubs in Tsim Sha Tsui East have already shut down due to industry decline, leaving Club EJ as the last one in the area, and its manager Foon struggles to keep the business afloat. After Wong, the owner of the club and Foon's godfather, dies, Foon wishes to continue running the club. However, Mrs. Wong despises nightclubs, viewing them as unseemly businesses, and plans to sell EJ to the entertainment corporation Muse, where Foon's ex-wife Dame V serves as CEO and is handling the acquisition. V believes that Foon's strong loyalty toward his problematic hostesses leads to EJ's losses and aims to replace all the hostesses with better non-locals. Foon pleads with V not to fire his hostesses, and she offers a compromise that the hostesses can compete for a month with those earning more allowed to stay. After 30 days, Foon's hostesses are overwhelmingly defeated by V's, but Foon decides to let V fire him instead to keep his hostesses employed.

Foon follows V to Macau when she goes to gamble. The two collaborate at the casino and win a fortune. Their past feelings rekindle and they spend a night together at the resort. However, when Foon asks about returning to EJ, they have a falling out and Foon leaves defeatedly. After V returns to Hong Kong, she is informed by Prince Fung, the son of Muse's chairman whom she looks down on, that she is fired and that he is canceling the acquisition of EJ. Since V is the guarantor of the deal, she must either complete the purchase herself by buying EJ for HK$80 million, or face legal consequences. Meanwhile, Fung leverages his connections in the police and triads to disrupt EJ's daily operations, prompting V to team up with Foon to protect EJ from shutting down amid the failed acquisition. Although they sell everything they have, they only manage to raise about HK$20 million, far short of the acquisition price. Therefore, they decide to ruin Fung instead and plan to set a trap for him.

From Bobo, one of the hostesses, they learn about Ace, a stockbroker acquainted with Fung, has embezzled Fung's money and lost HK$20 million in stock trading. They blackmail him into assisting with their plan and also enlist Yiu, a frequent patron and billionaire previously targeted by Fung in the stock market, to join them. One night, when Fung has a booking, they arrange for a retired police superintendent and a barrister to appear simultaneously, creating the illusion that the police are investigating a case involving a triad boss hired by Yiu to do dirty work. During this time, Foon approaches Fung and pretends to try to scam him, but Fung quickly exposes him, unaware that it is part of Foon and V's plan to boost his ego. They then stage an arrest of Yiu in front of Fung, misleading him into believing that Yiu's company's stock price will plummet, and prompting him to invest all his savings in short selling.

Fung loses all his money in the transaction and is discharged from his position by his father, while Yiu rewards Foon and V with HK$100 million for executing their revenge. However, they decide to close Club EJ and instead follow the trend of opening a private club with the money, with all their hostesses returning as Foon and V co-run the new business.

== Cast ==
- Dayo Wong as Foon Kwan, a "stubborn" manager of Club EJ, the last-standing nightclub in Tsim Sha Tsui
- Sammi Cheng as Dame V, Foon's ex-wife and business executive who is appointed as Club EJ's new CEO
- Louise Wong as Coco, a mama-san of Club EJ who has a romantic interest with Fung
- Fish Liew as Mimi, a mama-san of Club EJ who unilaterally loves Foon
- Yeung Wai-lun as Turf, Foon's "wisecracking" assistant and right-hand man
- Siuyea Lo as Prince Fung, a playboy who secretly plans to overtake Club EJ. Lo based the character on Ngai Wing-hau (played by Francis Ng) in Infernal Affairs II (2003).
- Dee Ho as Ace, a stockbroker in Fung's inner social circle
- Renci Yeung as Bobo, a hostess of Club EJ known for her sexiness
- Mandy Tam as ChiLing, a hostess of Club EJ good at drinking games
- Sumling Li as Crystal, a 38-year-old hostess of Club EJ
- Hazel Lam as BB, a cute-looking hostess of Club EJ
- Amy Tang as Yui, a Japanese-speaking waitress at Club EJ

Also appearing in the film are Tse Kwan-ho as Philip Yiu, a billionaire whose ex-lover resembles Mimi; Stephen Tung as Boss Fun, a triad boss acquainted with Yiu; Hui So-ying as Mrs. Wong, Foon's godmother; and Kay Choi as "Kwai Fong" Franchesca, a "quirky" hostess. Choi based her character's design on singer Cally Kwong and accent on Malaysian actress Lin Min Chen. Malaysian social media influencer Miko Wong appears as Mickey, a non-local hostess working under Dame V.

== Production ==
=== Development ===
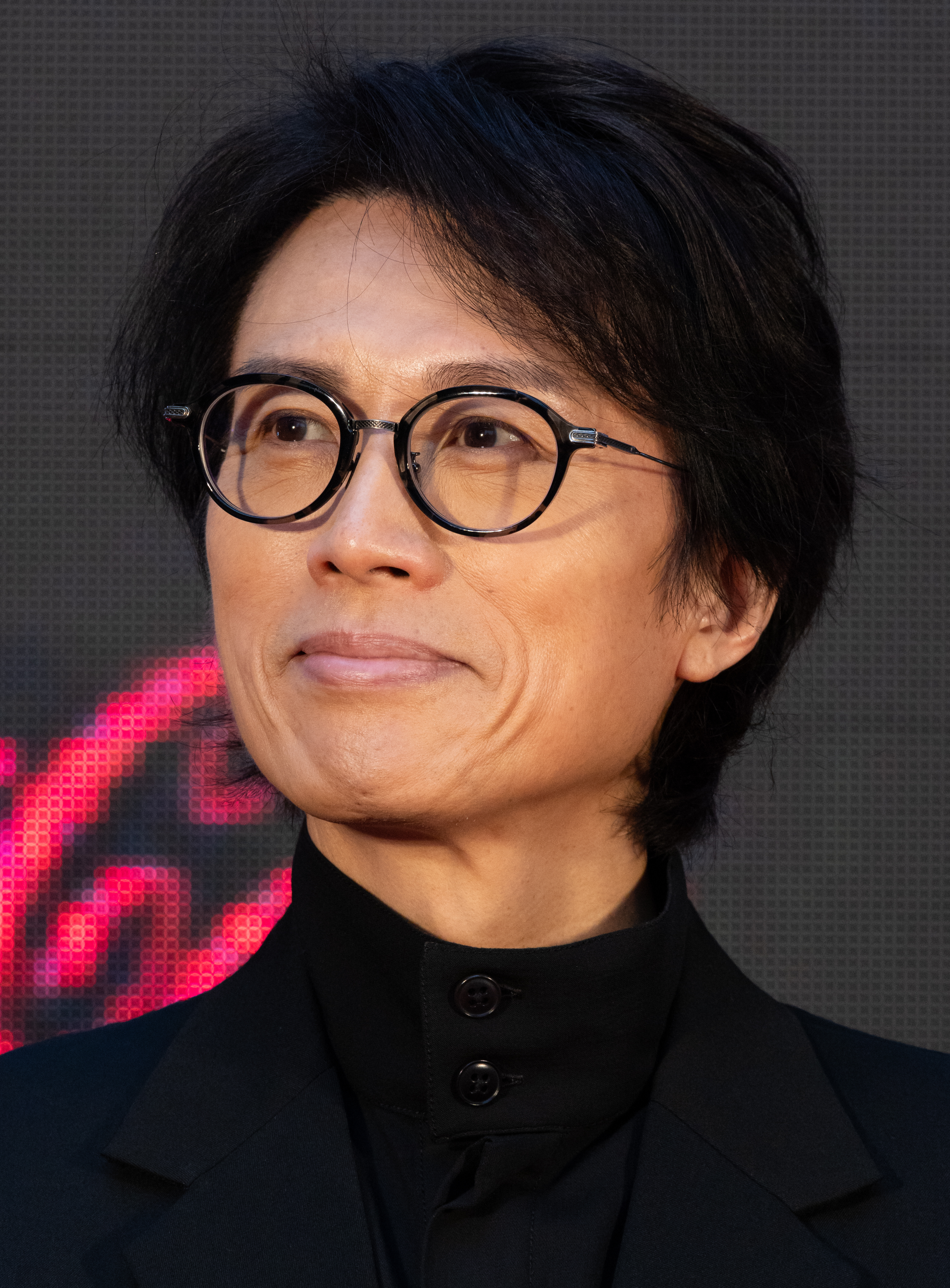
Dayo Wong, who plays Foon

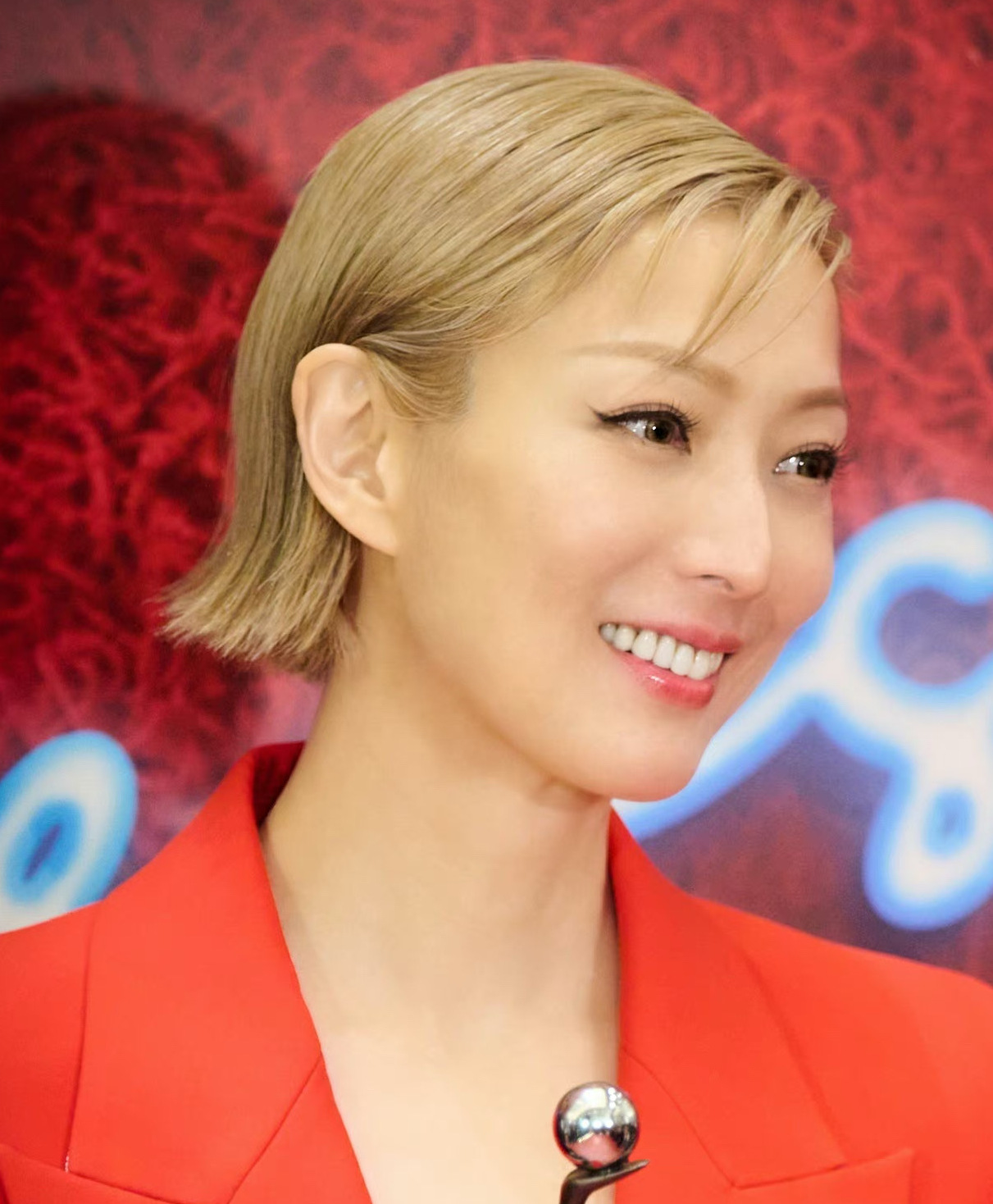
Sammi Cheng, who plays Dame V

A Guilty Conscience (2023), a Hong Kong Chinese New Year film for the Year of the Rabbit, became the highest-grossing Hong Kong film at that time and the first Hong Kong film to gross over HK$100 million. According to director Jack Ng, the idea for Night King came during a celebratory dinner for A Guilty Conscience, when actress Renci Yeung asked him if he considered producing a sequel. Ng rejected the idea, as he did not want to work on another film with a "serious subject matter", and since he saw "many beautiful ladies" at the dinner, he instead proposed making a standalone film about nightclubs, which everyone agreed to on the spot. Ng also mentioned that his fondness for nightclubs contributed to the film's concept, which he found the decline of the industry in Tsim Sha Tsui East during the 2000s reflect a resonance with contemporary Hong Kong. Ng initially envisioned the film as a triad film, which he described as "violent and blood-soaked". In 2024, he invited Ho Miu-ki to co-write the screenplay, with the aim of incorporating women's voices into this women-centric story. Ho, whose career mainly focuses on comedy writing, was hesitant about this genre and sought advice from her mentor and veteran filmmaker Chan Hing-ka. Chan noted that audiences would not want to be immersed in the somber mood of economic decline by the film's release and advised Ng to change the genre to comedy instead.

Many of the cast are returning from A Guilty Conscience, including Dayo Wong, Renci Yeung, Louise Wong, Fish Liew, Dee Ho, and Tse Kwan-ho. Ng, a fan of Sammi Cheng, invited her to star after seeing her presenting awards at the Hong Kong Film Awards ceremony and noticing her charisma similar to the character Dame V. He also cast Sumling Li, a member of the girl group Collar, after watching her in Once in a Blue Moon (2023), while Mandy Tam and Hazel Lam were handpicked by Ho Miu-ki. To prepare for her role, Tam specifically learned to play drinking games from experts. The rest of the hostesses were cast through public auditions, mostly consisting of social media influencers and new actresses, and they selected approximately one out of every ten. To prepare for their roles, the actresses were arranged visits to a real nightclub in Tsim Sha Tsui East, where they interacted and dined with experienced mama-sans to learn about their work and mindset, and were taught by professional hostesses how to pour wine and pose properly. The crew also prepared meals for the actresses to help them maintain their figures.

=== Filming and post-production ===
Principal photography was announced to begin in June 2025, with Anthony Pun serving as cinematographer. In May 2025, HK01 reported that a sequel to A Guilty Conscience was set to begin filming. However, on 25 May, A Guilty Conscience's official social media pages clarified that Edko Films and Jack Ng do not have plans to produce a sequel. On 2 June, Ng announced on social media that the project set to be shot is another comedy film starring Dayo Wong and newcomer Sammi Cheng, marking their second collaboration after Temporary Family (2014), with a scheduled release as a Chinese New Year film in 2026. Club EJ was entirely a set, based on research by the crew on closed-down nightclubs, and it specifically included a large dance floor, which no longer exists in any current nightclubs in Hong Kong. A hotel scene and a casino scene were shot at the Galaxy Macau resort in Cotai, Macau. Filming wrapped in September 2025.

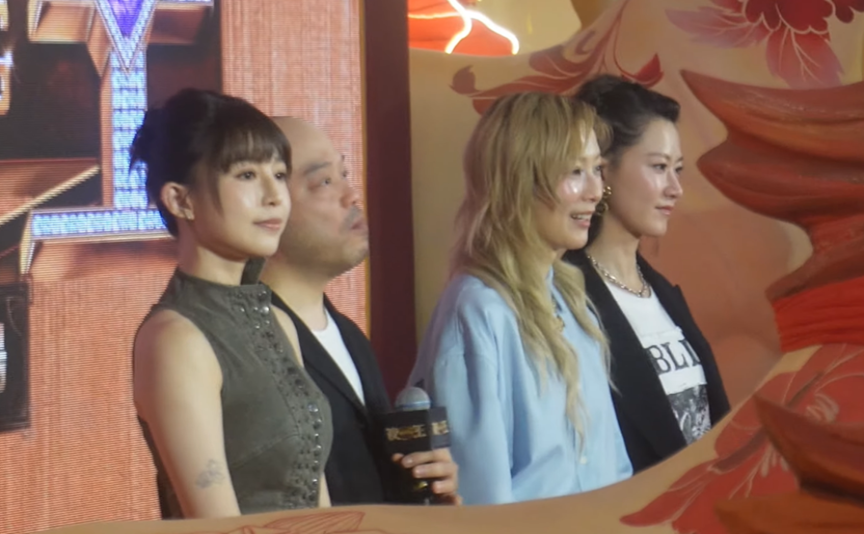
Miko Wong (left), Jack Ng, Sammi Cheng, and Fish Liew promoting the film at Pavilion Kuala Lumpur in February 2026

The original cut of the film was approximately four hours long. Renci Yeung, Sumling Li, Mandy Tam, and Hazel Lam, who portrayed hostesses, each originally had an individual backstory for their characters, but were all cut during editing due to runtime constraints, including an intimate scene between Yeung and Dee Ho. The film was scored by Iris Liu, and featured a re-recorded version of Sammi Cheng's 1997 single "Everyone is a Superstar" as its theme song, with 15 of the actresses joining Cheng in the singing, while Yeung Wai-lun and Dee Ho performed a newly added rap section. On 23 December 2025, the film released its official trailer and character posters. Trinity CineAsia acquired its distribution rights in the United Kingdom, Ireland, and the Benelux region in January 2026. A Club EJ, which recreates the set in the film, was opened and displayed at Elements in the same month. In February, the film was presented by Edko Films at the European Film Market.

== Release ==
Night King had its world premiere at Galaxy Macau on 6 February 2026, followed by early screenings in Hong Kong beginning on 14 February (Valentine's Day). The film was released nationwide in Malaysia and Singapore on 16 February 2026, and opened theatrically in Hong Kong on 17 February as a Chinese New Year film for the Year of the Horse. It was also theatrically released in North America, the United Kingdom, Ireland, and the Netherlands on 20 February, and received for a nationwide release in Taiwan on 13 March.

== Reception ==
=== Box office ===
Night King raked in approximately HK$2 million from its early screenings, and opened with a gross of HK$8.66 million, making it the Hong Kong Chinese New Year film with the highest opening day and single-day gross and bringing its total revenue to HK$11 million on its first day of release. It reached HK$26.7 million by the fourth day, making it the highest-grossing Chinese New Year film of 2026 in the region, and grossed HK$48.76 million after a week of release, surpassing the HK$48.36 million record set by Back to the Past (2025) and becoming the Hong Kong film with the highest first-week box office. The box office reached HK$63 million by the eleventh day of release, surpassing Anita (2021) and becoming the eighth-highest grossing Hong Kong film of all time. The film accumulated a gross of HK$97.5 million by 18 March and surpassed Back to the Past to become the fourth-highest grossing Hong Kong film of all time. It became the fourth Hong Kong film to reach the HK$100 million benchmark, after A Guilty Conscience (2023), Twilight of the Warriors: Walled In, and The Last Dance (both 2024), after a month of release. It surpassed Twilight of the Warriors: Walled In and became the third highest-grossing domestic film as of 25 April, after more than two months of release, making the top three highest-grossing Hong Kong films all starring Dayo Wong.

=== Critical response ===
Enoch Tam, writing for Vogue Hong Kong, commended Night King as another "thought-provoking" work by Jack Ng, following the genre-blending A Guilty Conscience (2023), and noted that although the film appears to present "sensuality, vulgarity, and dark humor", it delivers a "serious" allegory about the Hong Kong film industry and the city itself, with a more "rigorous" structure allowing all the stars to shine in counter-plays. Gabriel Tsang of the Hong Kong Film Critics Society praised the film's allegories as "preserving local culture in decline while reflecting Hong Kong cinema's decline", with the ending offering a hopeful vision of "abandoning past successes and embracing new trends to create opportunities".

Edmund Lee of the South China Morning Post gave it 3/5 stars, also observing Ng's attempt to "revisit the golden formula of his previous hit" and present "another allegory for Hong Kong's decline", despite the story being too "sanitized" and conservative, depicting hostesses "surrender[ing] their dignity" to men, and featuring "disjointed pacing and glitzy packaging", yet still providing "a largely crowd-pleasing spectacle of survival" that "remains fun to watch". Conversely, Ho Siu-bun found the film's depiction of love as its "most well-written" elements in his review for am730, especially the love triangle between Dayo Wong, Sammi Cheng, and Fish Liew, though he noted that the film "was not very funny" and that the third act which depicts a "business rivalry/scam sequence", somewhat "detours from the main theme".

Calvin Choi, reviewing for Hong Kong Economic Times, particularly praised the performances of Siuyea Lo and Kay Choi, noting that although Lo's character was "meant to be instrumental", he used "eye expressions, vocal tone, and some fidgets" to express the character's "treachery and unwavering ambition", while Choi's "deliberately humorous and ugly" character made her "the most talked-about character in the film". Keith Ho of HK01 also lauded the performances as "glamorous" and found Choi as the "most eye-catching character" despite limited screentime, while calling the female-centric and romantic scenes "well written", especially the chemistry between Foon and Dame V, for which he described Sammi Cheng's performance as "resilient".

The Guardian's Phil Hoad gave the film 2/5 stars, offering a rather critical review by describing it as a "lustrous, gauzily shot tribute to old-time Cantonese nightlife" that resembles a Wong Kar-wai film but is reduced to a "bevy of beauties" and fails to "satisfactorily close" any of its plotlines, lamenting it as a "lounge-lizard glass-tip to bygone Kowloon" that feels behind the times. Whang Yee Ling of the Singaporean newspaper The Straits Times also gave the film 2/5 stars, praising the cast and Cantonese dialogue but criticizing the script as "leaden" and sparkless, as well as "retrograde for its objectification of women", ultimately rendering the film as a "screwball battle-of-the-exes".

== Gallery ==
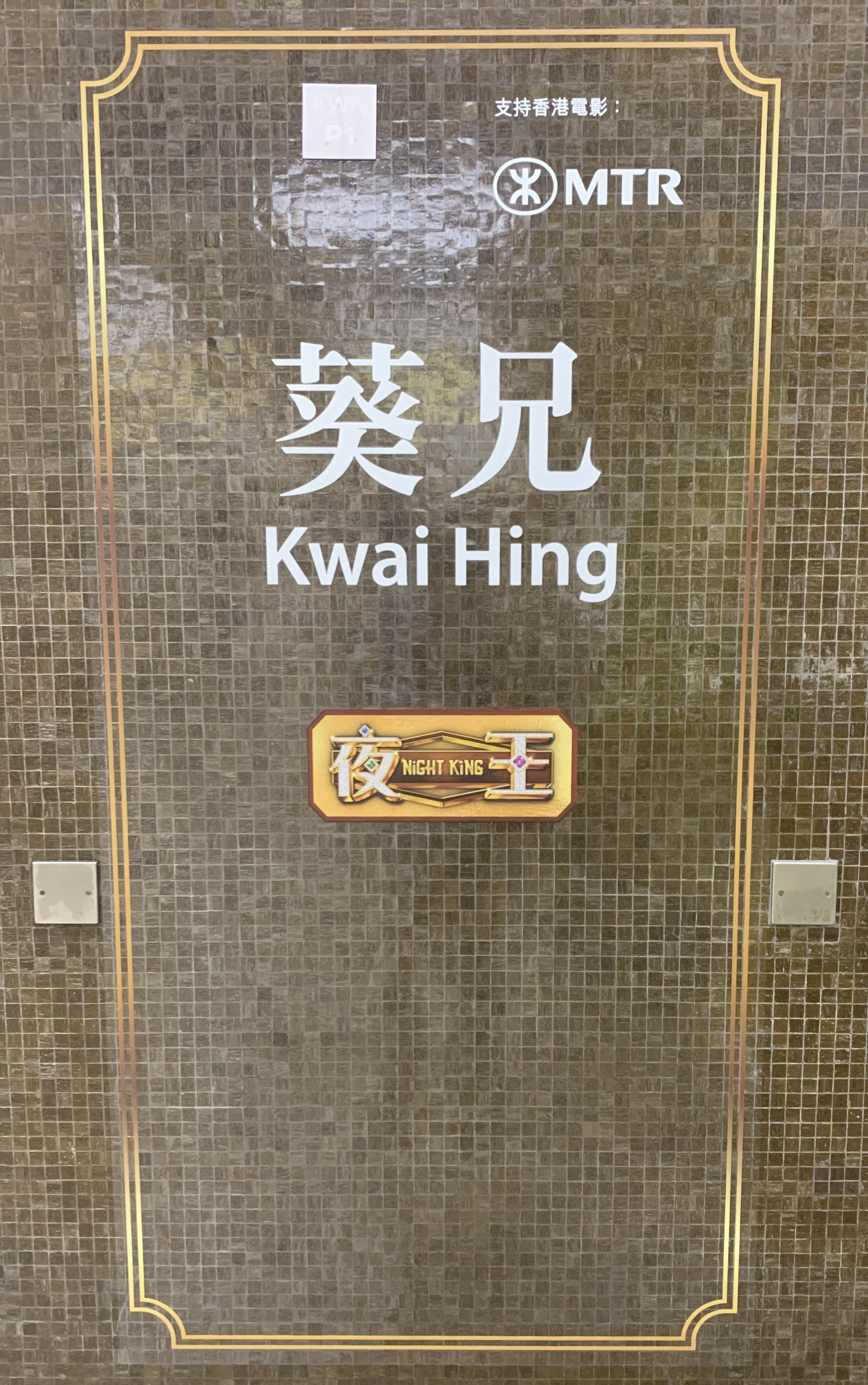
Promotional poster of Night King displayed at the concourse of Kwai Hing Station

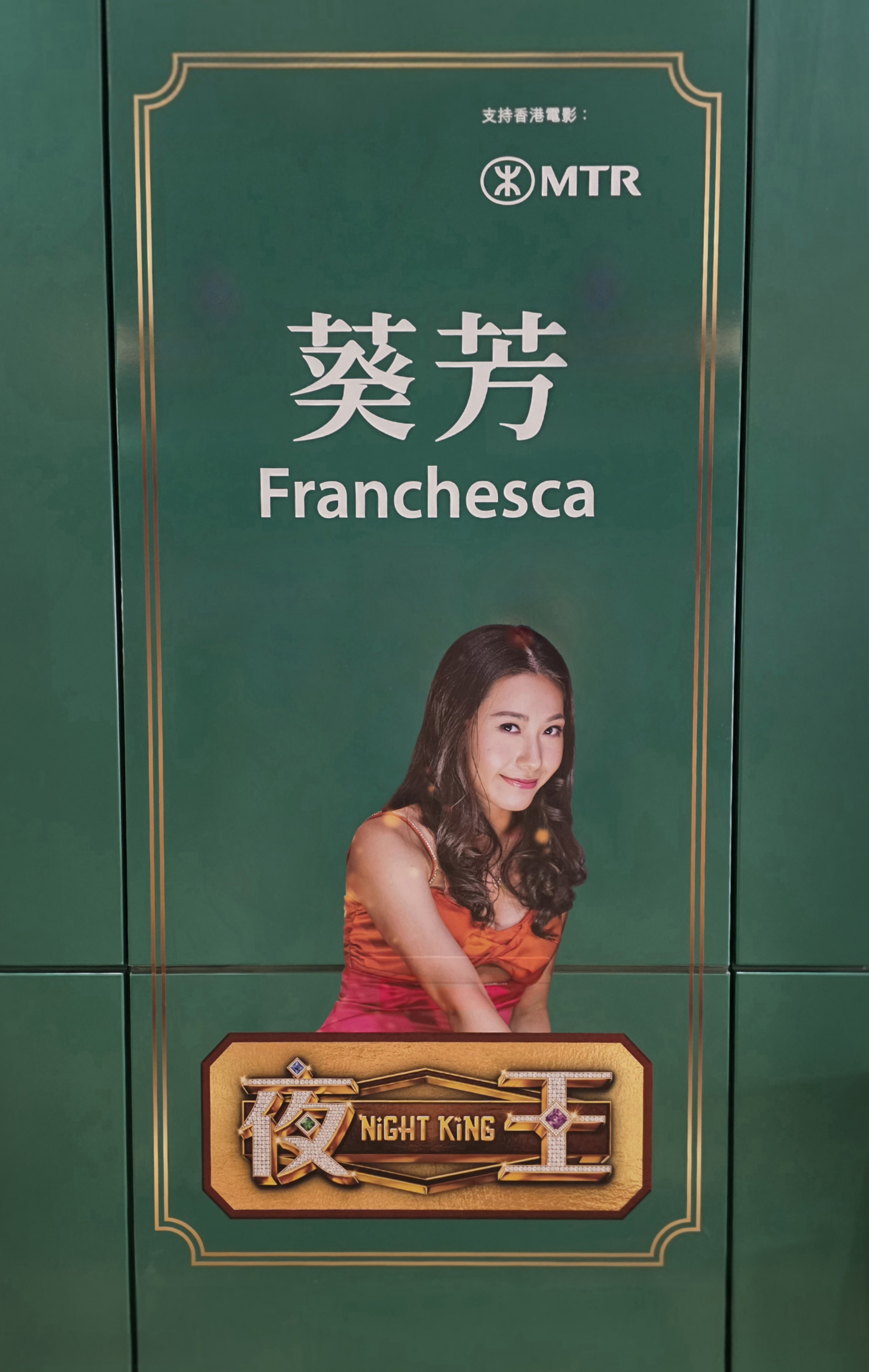
Promotional poster of Night King displayed at the concourse of Kwai Fong Station

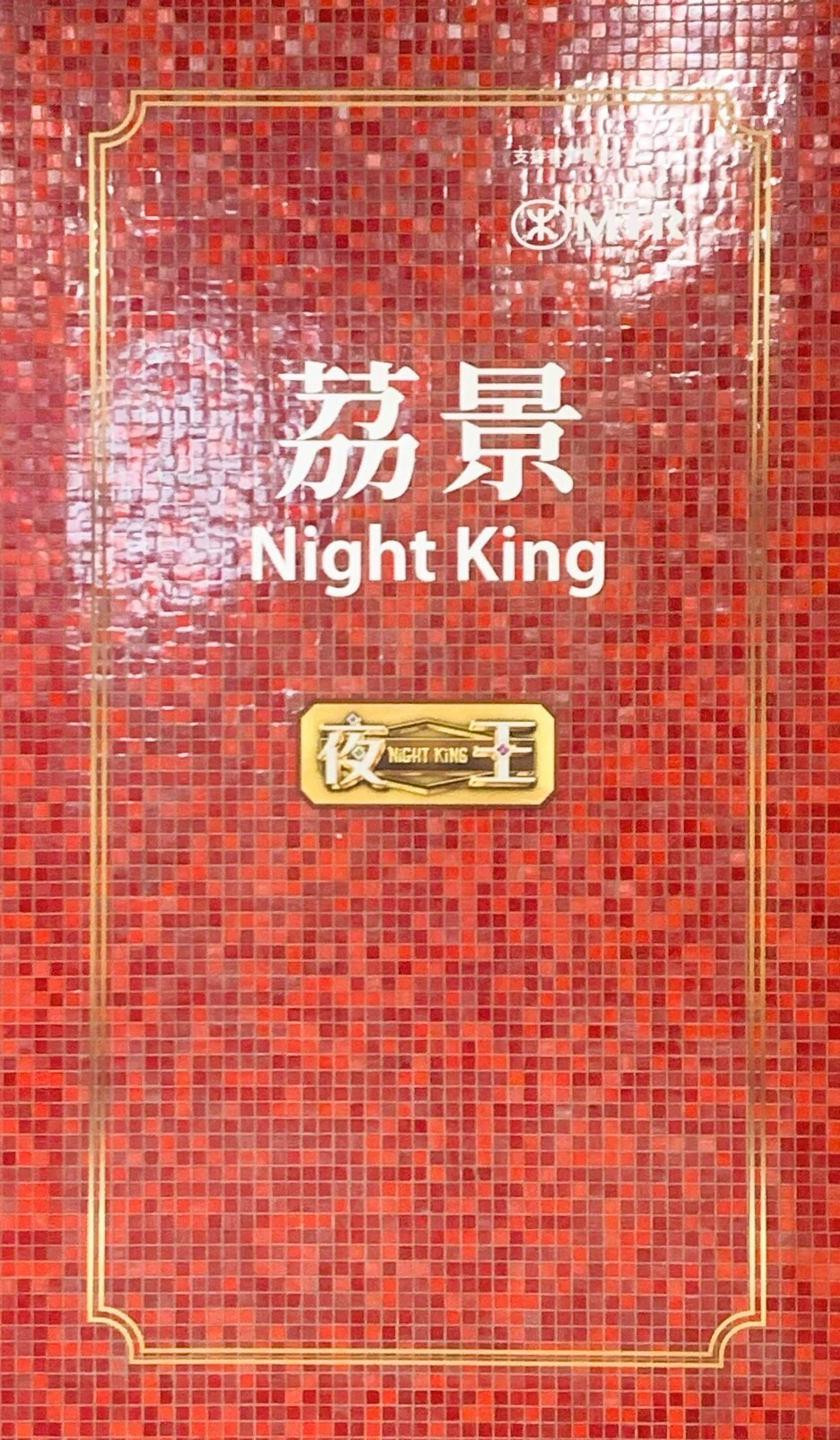
Promotional poster of Night King displayed at the concourse of Lai King Station
