= Mandy Tam (actress) =

Hong Kong actress and model (born 2000)

- 譚旻萱
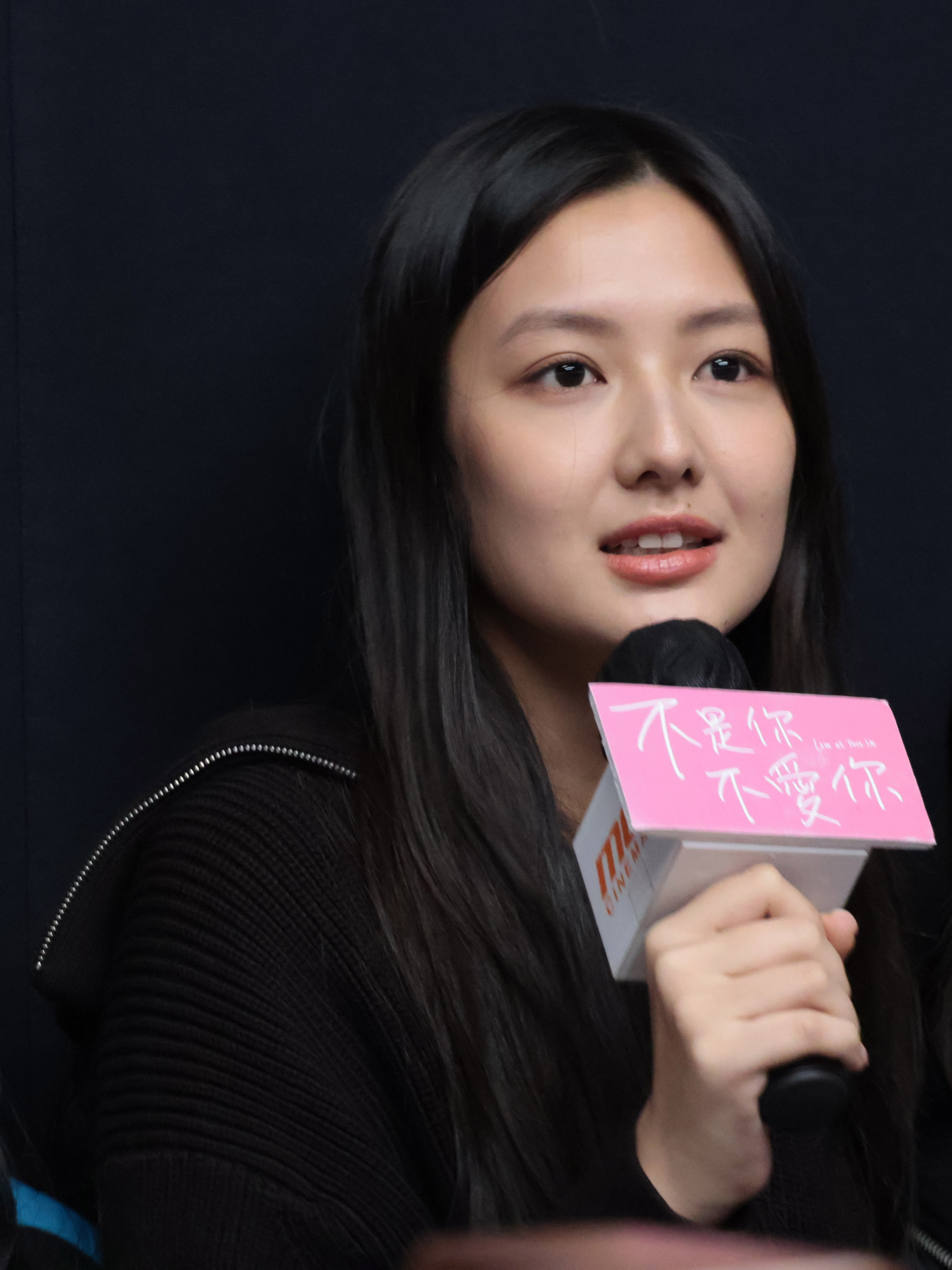
- Tam in December 2023
- Born: Tam Man-huen; 15 November 2000 (age 25); Hong Kong
- Occupations: Actress; model
- Years active: 2019–present

Mandy Tam Man-huen (Chinese: 譚旻萱; born 15 November 2000) is a Hong Kong actress and model. She gained attention through her appearances in the music videos of singer Edan Lui, and has starred in leading roles in the films Yum Investigation (2023) and Love at First Lie (2024). In 2026, she appeared as ChiLing in the comedy film Night King, which is currently the third-highest grossing Hong Kong film of all time.

== Biography ==
Tam was born on 15 November 2000 in Hong Kong. (Note: According to Ming Pao, Tam had her birthday on 15 November 2022 and reached age 22.) She is of Russian, Canadian, and Hong Kong descent. While in secondary school, Tam weighed around 77 kg, but later lost weight after taking up basketball and dancing. She joined her school's basketball team in Form 3, playing as a shooting guard. At the age of 17, while studying in Form 5, she was scouted by a talent manager after posting videos of herself playing basketball on social media, though she initially declined in order to focus on the Hong Kong Diploma of Secondary Education. The talent manager spent half a year convincing her father, and she ultimately joined the industry as a model after graduating from secondary school in 2019. She chose not to attend university, saying that she was "not particularly drawn to university life". She appeared in advertisements and music videos, including Edan Lui's songs "Mr. E's Series of Unfortunate Events" and "Talents", earning the nickname "E Girl" (Chinese: E女郎) for her frequent appearances in Lui's MVs. She also made a cameo appearance in the ViuTV series We Got Game, which also starred Lui, playing a street basketball player.

In November 2023, after two years of training, Tam debuted as a member of the girl group Me& under Media Asia Entertainment Group alongside Feanna Wong and Vian Lin, with their debut single "Eye to Eye". Tam also appeared in the horror comedy film Yum Investigation, playing a girl who hires the protagonists to catch ghosts, although film critic Calvin Choi remarked that her character "left little impression". She later starred as the female lead in Patrick Kong's romance film Love at First Lie, portraying the 18th incarnation of Bo in Kong's films, a high school graduate who falls in love with the character played by Edward Chen. Chung Kun-chuen of HK01 wrote that audiences could "feel Tam's personality through her performance", praising her "comedic sensibility and 'tomboyish' charm", while considering her acting competent for a newcomer. In November 2024, after Me& released its second single "Me & My Christmas Town", Tam suspended her group activities. In 2026, she starred in the comedy film Night King as ChiLing, a nightclub hostess, with film critic Enoch Tam praising "the 'rough-edged charm' she exuded, which broke away from her previously innocent star image". The film is currently the third-highest grossing Hong Kong film of all time. In the same year, she also attended the Milan Fashion Week, and appeared as Bianca Yeung, a police inspector loyal to protagonist M.B. Lee (played by Terrance Lau), in the crime thriller film Cold War 1994.

== Filmography ==
=== Film ===
Year	Title	Role	Notes/Ref.
2023	Yum Investigation	Yuen (阿源)	
2024	Love at First Lie	Bo (鍾家寶)	
2026	Night King	ChiLing	
2026	Cold War 1994	Bianca Yeung (楊碧兒)	
TBA	Cold War 1995	Bianca Yeung (楊碧兒)	

=== Television ===
Year	Title	Role	Notes/Ref.
2022	We Got Game	Mandy	Cameo
2026	Case X Decoded	Ho Oi-lin (何愛蓮)	Main role
