= 夜王 =

夜王, meaning 'king of night', may refer to:

- Night King, 2026 Hong Kong film
- Yaoh, 2006 Japanese television series starring Masahiro Matsuoka

== See also ==
- Night King
