= House of Mahjong =

2007 Hong Kong film by Marco Mak

- DVD cover
- Traditional Chinese: 嚦咕嚦咕對對碰
- Simplified Chinese: 呖咕呖咕对对碰
- Hanyu Pinyin: Lìgū Lìgū Duìduì Pèng
- Jyutping: Lik6gu1 Lik6gu1 Deoi3deoi3 Pung3
- Directed by: Marco Mak
- Written by: Cheng Shing-Mo; Lam Chiu-Wang; Lau Ka-Ming; Kom Chun-Yu
- Produced by: Ng Kin-Hung
- Starring: Rain Li; Dayo Wong; Tat-Ming Cheung; Matt Chow; Chun Chau Ha
- Cinematography: Tung Wai-Keung
- Edited by: Azrael Chung
- Music by: Marco Wan
- Production companies: Century Creator Co., Ltd.
- Release date: 1 February 2007
- Running time: 90 minutes
- Country: Hong Kong
- Language: Cantonese

House of Mahjong is a 2007 comedy film directed by Marco Mak and written by Cheng Shing-Mo, Lam Chiu-Wang, Lau Ka-Ming and Kom Chun-Yu. It was released in Hong Kong on 1 February 2007.

== Plot ==
Tenants of a run-down old mall play mahjong with the owner for their rent, including Gigi (Rain Li), a sexy new tenant who learns the techniques for playing Taiwanese mahjong in order to fit in. While she loses to the owner Fu Ho, he is impressed with her determination and rents the lot out to her anyway.

However the owner's son (Raymond Wong Ho-yin) hates the tenants and thinks they take advantage of his father. His father, though, likes things just the way they are, especially since Gigi (Rain Li), who looks like his old flame, has opened up shop. His son plans to run them all out and remodel the mall, so he hires a mahjong master (Matt Chow) to destroy them in a tournament to avenge his father.

Finding four mahjong experts to gamble with the tenants, Gigi, Sam, Beauty, and the other tenants soon lose their money and means of survival. Unwilling to simply give up, the tenants of the mall rally together and hone their mahjong skills in order to keep their place in the mall.

== Cast ==
- Rain Li - Gigi
- Dayo Wong
- Tat-Ming Cheung - Fortune Teller Cheung
- Matt Chow - Lo Mong-tak
- Chun Chau Ha - Rich Man Chiu (Fu Ho)
- Emily Kwan
- Elanne Kwong - Ling
- Amanda Lee Wai Man
- Sam Lee - Sam
- Candy Lo - Hung
- Chi Wah Wong - Beauty Lam
- Raymond Wong Ho-Yin - Chiu's son (Sun Gui)
- On-on Yu

== Box Office ==
Details regarding the film's box office performance are limited.
