= War of the Genders =

2000 Hong Kong TV sitcom

- Promo poster
- 男親女愛
- Written by: Alex Pao; Lam Siu-chi
- Starring: Carol Cheng; Dayo Wong; Marsha Yuan; Patrick Tang; Kingdom Yuen; Bowie Wu; Joyce Chan; Siu Leung; Ram Chiang; Kitty Yuen; Chor Yuen; Joseph Lee
- Opening theme: "Blue Skies" (藍天) performed by Dayo Wong
- Composer: Wing Lo
- Country of origin: Hong Kong
- Original language: Cantonese
- No. of episodes: 100 (Hong Kong original TV broadcast edition) / 50 (official releasing)

Production
- Producer: Steven Tsui
- Production location: Hong Kong
- Running time: 20 minutes (per episode) / 45 minutes (official releasing)
- Production company: TVB

Original release
- Network: TVB Jade
- Release: 21 February – 7 July 2000

Related
- Man and Woman in Love (stage play)

War of the Genders is a Hong Kong television sitcom produced by TVB. It originally aired on TVB Jade from 21 February to 7 July 2000, totalling 100 episodes. It revolves around the office workers employed at C.K.Law Firm, a fictional law firm located in Central, Hong Kong. The series received critical acclaim and explosive success during its run. It achieved an average viewership rating of 35 points and a peak of 50 points, the highest-ever rating achieved by a TVB drama in the 2000s decade. This record was later broken by the 2005 Korean television drama Dae Jang Geum and the 2008 TVB drama Moonlight Resonance, both which also peaked at 50.

== Plot ==
The series revolved around a solicitor Frances Mo (Carol Cheng) and her paralegal advisor Yu Lok-tin (Dayo Wong). The two characters go from loathing to loving each other by the end of the series, and eventually become a couple.

A large part of the series takes place in C.K. Law Firm where Frances and Lok work. Their relationship extends past the office as they both live in the same apartment which gives them more opportunities to cross paths.

Between avoiding the "spinster" label and creatively fighting trivial lawsuits, Frances uses her wit and class to outsmart her main rival, solicitor Alex Pao (Joseph Lee). In addition, Frances also has personal problems to deal with in the homefront such as getting used to her new younger stepmother, Yuen Yuen (Martha Yuan).

There is a play (Man & Woman In Love, 男親女愛舞台劇) performed by the original cast as the ending of the series in November to December 2000. A 34 VCD set of the TV series and 3 VCD set of the drama were released for sale.

== Characters ==
=== Main characters ===
- Carol Cheng portrays Frances Mo (毛小慧; Mo Siu-wai) — Well known around the office of CK Law Firm as Ms. Mo, Frances is a vain spinster nearing forty who tries to appear professional at all times and act like a real class act. She's single and getting to a stage in life where it is getting her down. With her wit and sharp tongue she is able to put anyone in their places especially her paralegal, Yu Lok-tin. Her favourite sayings are "Off" (shut up) and "B.T." (bad taste). Despite her high maintenance ways and irritability, everyone at the law firm respects her.
- Dayo Wong portrays Lok (余樂天; Yu Lok-tin) — With very limited English, it is a wonder how he got the job as Frances's paralegal. He is always stuck with the disgusting jobs, partially because he tries to come across as a ladies' man though this is not really the case. In addition, he puts up a facade of being both extremely poor and extremely cheap when he turns out to have quite a bit of money. A habitual gambler, he always dreams of hitting the "3T" jackpot at the horse races.
  - Siu Keung (小強) is a cockroach and pet of Yu Lok Tin. He lets Siu Keung roam freely around the house. Several different "Siu Keungs" have appeared as he's been killed several times (mostly by Ms. Mo), he was even eaten by a turtle in episode 53. Yu Lok Tin calls Siu Keung his brother. Siu Keung often crawls into Yu Lok Tin's or Miss Mo's cup of instant noodles and often gets on Miss Mo's nerves. Eventually, Miss Mo opens up to the pet, and he was briefly "adopted" by Miss Mo. He was kept in a glass container and very well looked after by Miss Mo during his "adoption".
- Marsha Yuan as Yuen Yuen (阮婉; Yuen Yuen) — She is Frances's stepmother for much of the series. Frances tries to hide the fact that she is her stepmother because of their age difference. Yuen Yuen is an almost perfect woman with looks and brains. She seems to know a bit of everything but she is also gullible and naive. She once worked in the C.K. Law Firm and House Bar. Everyone seems to like her as both men and women admire her beauty (in their own special ways) and her wide array of knowledge.
- Kingdom Yuen as Sin Jeh / Angel (梅日仙; Mui Yat-sin) — Another spinister in the Law Firm, and also the aunt of Yu Lok Tin. She is stingy, untrendy and wears thick glasses. She's a maternal figure to both Ms. Mo and Ah Lok. A fixture of the law firm, it is heavily implied that she and CK were a couple. Towards the end of the series she begins a relationship with Professor Mo who she affectionally calls "Mo Mo".
- Ram Chiang as James Tsim (詹士安; Tsim Sz-on) — James is an effeminate worker in C.K. law firm. He takes too much care of his appearance and spends much of his time in the office grooming himself. It was believed that his effeminate behavior was caused by excessive estrogen from Chinese medicinal jelly he's eaten since childhood, but this was proven false. He once fell in love with Miss Mo.
- Joyce Chan as Apple (吳巧心; Ng Hau-sum) — Personal assistant to Frances. She is renowned for her stunning figure but rough background as a daughter of a fruit shop owner (hence her name). She was headhunted by a fitness club to be the face of their new promotion after appearing on an ad for CK Law Firm as Little Bo Peep. Apple had a brief stint as a model before she quit because of a dispute regarding her image.
- Patrick Tang as Man (蕭鐵男; Siu Tit-nam) — A tabloid photographer. It is found that he is Sin Jeh's nephew, and consequently Lok's cousin (which he humorously expresses).
- Kitty Yuen as Happy (米笑娥; Mai Siu-ngor) — Man's friend and fellow tabloid reporter. Jokes are sometimes made in reference to her height and androgyny.
- Joseph Lee as Alex Pao (鮑一柱; Pao Yat-chu) — The rival lawyer of Francis. Although he is self-confident, he is always left speechless by her razor sharp tongue. He is known to be extremely egocentric and cares a lot about his image. The running joke surrounding him is that he seems to be the only other lawyer in all of Hong Kong since he is constantly the person who Francis goes against in court. His name is the namesake of the sitcom's screenwriter, Alex Pao.
- Bowie Wu as Professor Mo (毛漢文; Mo Hon-man) — Frances's father. A history lecturer, he spontaneously marries Yuen Yuen, his student, that he encounters in Egypt. He appears sporadically throughout the series. Towards the end of the series, he divorces Yuen Yuen and begins a relationship with Sin Jeh.
- Siu Leung as C.K. Law (羅中堅; Law Chung-kin) — The owner of the law firm. His appearances in the show are sparse and he is known to be greedy and affectionately connected with Tsin Jie. He's portrayed as an incompetent boss (both financially and in a business sense), and has a family in Canada which is sporadically visits. While Yuen Yuen was working at the firm, C.K. lecherous approaches toward her were highlighted in Francis' dream where he is identified by Lok as, literally, "Seven Color Wolf".
- Joe Junior as Henry Lo (盧亨利; Lo Hang-lei) — A singer back in the day, he's now the proud owner of House Bar, the hangout for most of the characters. Dated Sin Jeh early in the series and shares a bit of a rivalry with C.K.

=== Recurring characters ===
- Waise Lee as Herman Wong — A perverted man who had been in the same secondary school as Frances. Frances once had a crush on him and dated him for a while until he tried to molest her and other elderly woman. He makes 2 appearances. His first, as a client of Frances, who successfully defends from a sexual harassment charge. On a subsequent date to thank her for her work, she finds out that he really is a pervert who puts on lipstick and goes after women. On his second appearance, he returns to stalk Frances and forces her to kiss Lok.
- Liz Kong as Audrey Chung — A brief character, she dates Lok's for a while. They share a tumultuous relationship, which ends shortly. It is discovered that she's a lesbian and begins to pursue Frances. Her attempts to scare her away do not work, until she pretends that Siu Keung is her pet.
- Rachel Lee as Michelle Fung (馮嘉麗; Fung Ka-lai) — Fresh from law school, a lawyer who briefly worked for Alex Pao. Lok sponsor her in her university studies abroad and she dated Yu Lok Tin for a while when she returned to Hong Kong. In Frances' eyes she is perfect in every aspect (something that she realizes that she does not have) and she goes to great lengths to sabotage her work.

=== Minor characters ===
- Chung Kin-man as Simon — One of the employee of C.K.office.
- Tong Chun-ming as Ming — One of the employee of C.K.office.
- Yeung Hoi-chi as Sue — One of the employee of C.K.office.
- Wong Yuet-ming as Cat (older twin), Chan Sui-wah as Sandy (younger twin) — Twin female secretaries in C.K Law Firm that often say the same things at the same time, they date male twins.
- Chor Yuen as Chief (夏浪; Ha Long), the owner of educational and historic turned tabloid magazine, Leung Pang Magazine.
- Lily Leung as Big Sister Sung (宋秋棠; Sung Chau-tong), the secretary at Leung Pang.
- Chau Min-leung as King Gor (周勁夫; Chow King-fu), a photographer at Leung Pang.
- Suen Kwai-hing as Uncle Ngaam (杜青岩; To Ching-ngaam), a calligrapher and writer at Leung Pang.

== Cultural Legacy ==
Though not the originator of the phrase "Siu Keung" (小強), this series helped cement it as a colloquial way of referring to cockroaches. It is now used regularly by TV program hosts and by Hong Kong netizens.
