= Iris Liu =

Hong Kong singer and composer

- 廖頴琛
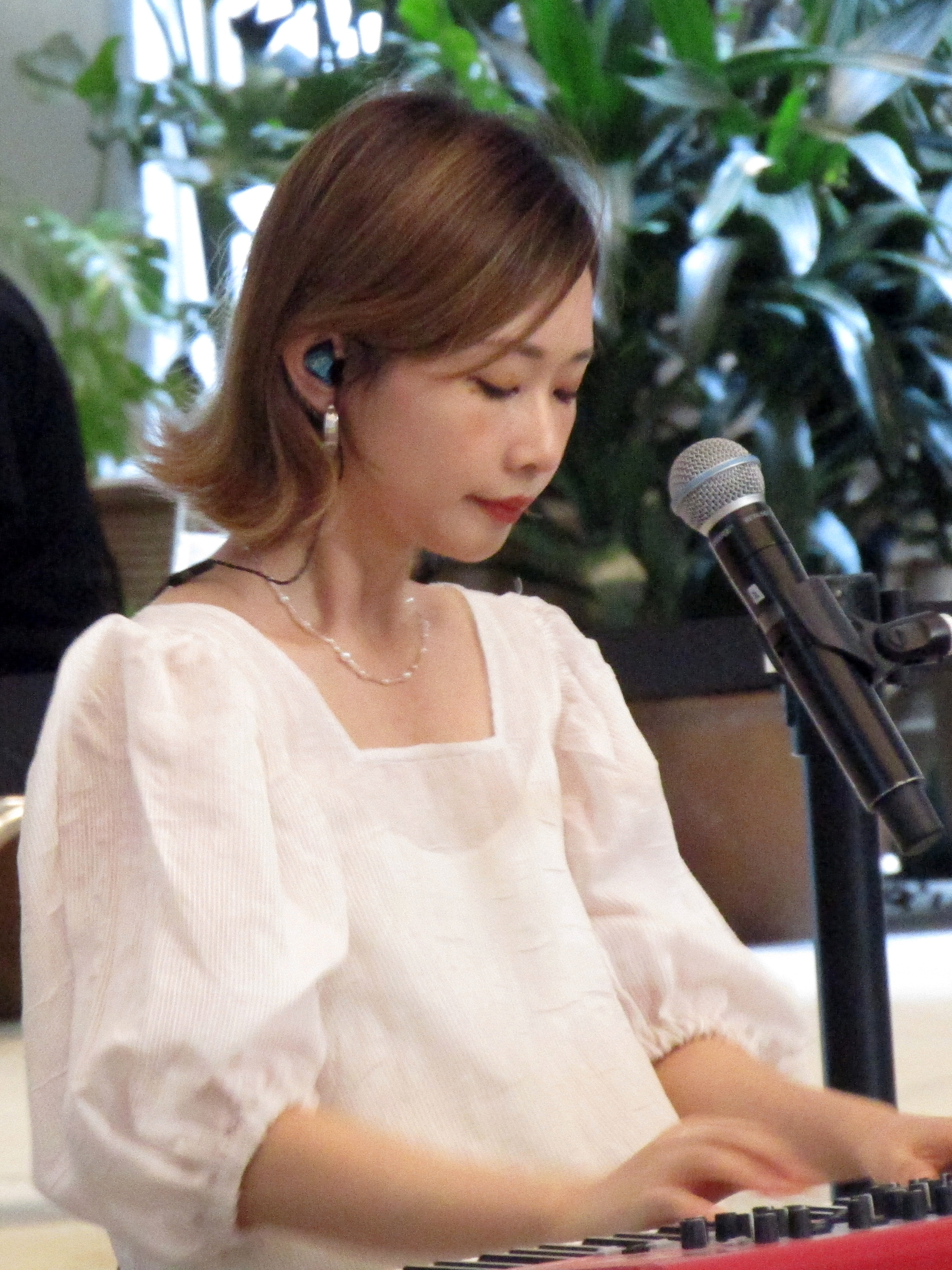
- Liu in September 2022
- Born: Liu Wing-sum; Hong Kong
- Education: Hong Kong Academy for Performing Arts (BMus)
- Occupations: Singer; Composer
- Years active: 2014–present

Iris Liu Wing-sum (Chinese: 廖頴琛), also known by her stage name iii, is a Hong Kong singer and film score composer. She formed an experimental band SoundTube with Dipsy Ha in 2014, and debuted as a soloist in 2020 after the band's dissolvement with the single "I". She ventured into film score composition the same year, contributing to films including Hand Rolled Cigarette (2020), A Guilty Conscience, Time Still Turns the Pages (both 2023), and Night King (2026). She received a nomination for Best Original Film Score in the 42nd Hong Kong Film Awards for Time Still Turns the Pages.

== Biography ==
Liu was born in the 1990s. She studied composition at the Hong Kong Academy for Performing Arts, citing her decision to study music was inspired by listening to a radio drama composed by singer-songwriter Ivana Wong during secondary school, which motivated her to write music like Wong's. During her time at HKAPA, she was a member of the jazz band society and began learning singing in university. She formed the experimental band SoundTube with her classmate Dipsy Ha at the end of 2014, where Liu served as the vocalist and Ha as the pianist and trumpeter. The band performed at festivals including Taipei Music Nonstop and Noise Pop Festival in San Francisco, but disbanded in 2019 after Ha had a child and could no longer dedicate as much time to music. Liu then pursued independent ventures and debuted as a soloist in 2020 under the stage name "iii", which derives from the three "i"s in her English name Iris Liu and the pronunciation is similar to "I" and "Eye". She released her debut single "I" in the same year, followed by her first album EYEEYEEYE and her debut live concert "EYE EYE EYE-iii Iris Liu Live 2021" in November 2021.

In 2020, Liu also began composing film scores, debuting with Chan Kin-long's Hand Rolled Cigarette. She met Hanz Au, her future frequent collaborator, while working on short film scores through referrals from her HKAPA classmates, and together they scored a short film by Wong Fei-pang. They were introduced to Chan Kin-long through his City University classmate Jolyon Cheung, and formed Crash Music Production in 2020, a company named to reflect their contrasting musical styles and the creative clashes and chemistry involved in their collaboration. Liu also composed trailer music for the 2021 film Anita, and collaborated with On Chan, releasing the non-album single "Thunderless" in 2022. Following Hand Rolled Cigarette, Liu and Au received numerous film scoring offers, and they have cited the score's positive reception within the industry established their signature style. From 2022 to 2023, they collaborated on films such as Let It Ghost, A Guilty Conscience, Yum Investigation, It Remains, Dust to Dust, and Time Still Turns the Pages, as well as the ViuTV series Left On Read. They were nominated for Best Original Film Score in the 42nd Hong Kong Film Awards for Time Still Turns the Pages, and they have been invited to serve as music directors for the 43rd Hong Kong Film Awards in 2025.

== Filmography ==
=== Film ===
Year	Title	Notes
2020	Hand Rolled Cigarette	
2022	Let It Ghost	
2023	A Guilty Conscience	
2023	Yum Investigation	
2023	It Remains	
2023	Dust to Dust	
2023	Time Still Turns the Pages	
2024	Rob N Roll	
2025	Behind the Shadows	
2026	Night King	
2026	Cold War 1994	

=== Television ===
Year	Title	Notes
2023	Left On Read	

== Awards and nominations ==
Year	Award	Category	Work	Result	Ref.
2024	42nd Hong Kong Film Awards	Best Original Film Score	Time Still Turns the Pages	Nominated	
