= 2026 in Hong Kong =

- Decades: 2000s; 2010s; 2020s
- See also: Other events of 2026; History of Hong Kong • Timeline • Years

Events in the year 2026 in Hong Kong.

== Incumbents ==
Executive branch
Photo	Name	Position	Term
	John Lee	Chief Executive	1 July 2022 – present
	Eric Chan	Chief Secretary for Administration	1 July 2022 – present
	Paul Mo-po Chan	Financial Secretary	16 January 2017 – present
	Paul Ting-Kok Lam	Secretary for Justice	1 July 2022 – present

Legislative branch
Photo	Name	Position	Term
	Starry Lee	President of the Legislative Council	8 January 2026 – present

Judicial branch
Photo	Name	Position	Term
	Andrew Cheung	Chief Justice of the Court of Final Appeal	11 January 2021 – present

== Events ==
=== January ===
- 30 January – A backpack containing 51 million yen (USD330,000) in cash is stolen in a robbery outside a currency exchange shop in Sheung Wan.

=== February ===
- 2 February – Activist Jimmy Lai is sentenced to 20 years in prison following his conviction of colluding with foreign forces.
- 11 February – Kwok Yin-sang, the father of exiled pro-democracy activist Anna Kwok is convicted of making financial transactions involving "fugitives" as part of the national security law following an attempt to terminate an insurance policy on his daughter. He is sentenced to eight months' imprisonment on 26 February.
- 26 February – The Hong Kong Court of Appeal overturns Jimmy Lai's conviction for fraud in the subletting of office space.

=== March ===
- 4 March – The Central Criminal Court in London, United Kingdom, charges two British Chinese nationals of violating the National Security Act for spying on diasporic Hong Kongers on behalf of the China-appointed Government of Hong Kong.

=== May ===
- 8 May – Football players Brian Fok and Luciano are convicted along with a betting agent for running a match-fixing gambling operation that covered some 30 matches of the Hong Kong First Division League from 2021 to 2023.

=== June ===
- 11 June – Authorities announce the seizure of 230,000 suspected counterfeit 2026 FIFA World Cup-themed merchandise valued at $20 million.

=== July ===
- 24 July – The United States imposes a 12.5% tariff on Hong Kong, citing the presence of alleged forced labour in the supply chain.

=== September ===
- 11 September – Three activists are sentenced to up to seven years' imprisonment on charges of violating national security over their commemoration of the Tiananmen Square massacre in 1989.

=== October ===
- 12 October – The new Huanggang Port commences operations.
- 29 October – Winnie Ho resigns as Secretary for Housing amid an official apology by the government over the Wang Fuk Court fire in 2025.

=== November ===
- 5 November – Pro-democracy activist Joshua Wong is sentenced to 10 years' imprisonment on charges of colluding with foreign forces.

== Holidays ==
- 1 January – New Year's Day
- 17 February – Lunar New Year's Day
- 18 February – The second day of Lunar New Year
- 19 February – The third day of Lunar New Year
- 3 April, Friday – Good Friday
- 4 April, Saturday – The day following Good Friday
- 5 April, Friday – Ching Ming Festival
- 6 April, Monday – Easter Monday
- 1 May, Friday – Labour Day
- 24 May, Sunday – Buddha's Birthday
- 19 June, Friday – Tuen of The Festival
- 1 July, Wednesday – Hong Kong Special Administrative Region Establishment Day
- 1 October, Thursday – National Day
- 25 December, Friday – Christmas Day
- 26 December, Saturday – The first weekday after Christmas Day

== Arts and entertainment ==
- List of Hong Kong films of 2026

== Deaths ==
- 1 January – Yuen Cheung-yan, 69, actor, director, and fight choreographer
- 13 January – David Webb, 60, activist investor
- 9 June – Natalie Ng, 51, actress
- 2 July – Lam Wing-kee, 70, bookseller and political activist, founder of Causeway Bay Books
- 8 September – Tung Chee-hwa, 89, chief executive (1997–2005), vice chairman of the NCCPPCC (2005–2023), and member of the Executive Council (1992–1996)
- 18 October – Ng Hong-mun, 100, educator, deputy to the NPC (1975–2008).
