= Siuyea Lo =

Hong Kong actor (born 1986/1987)

- 盧鎮業
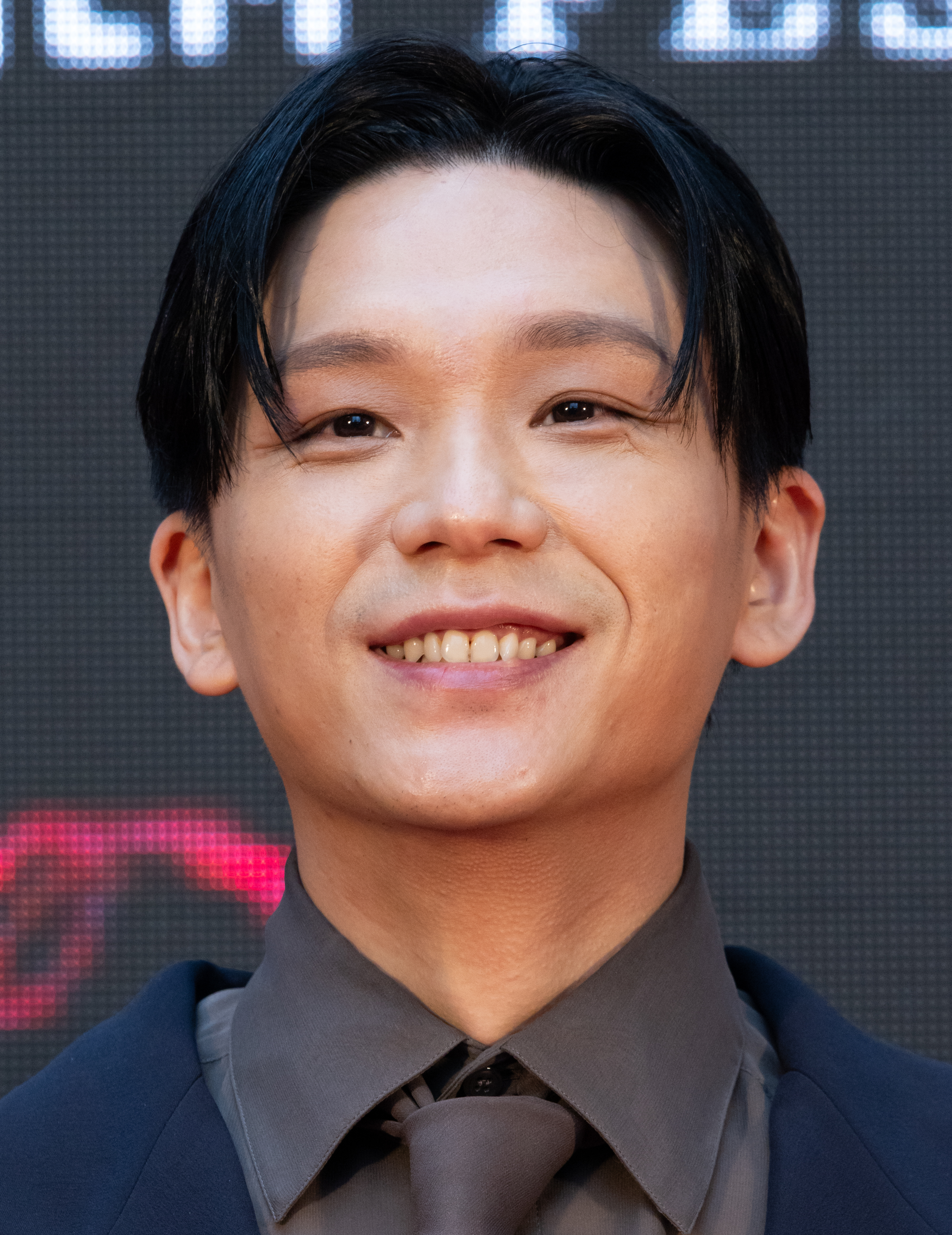
- Lo at the 2024 TIFF
- Born: Lo Chun-yip; 1986 or 1987 (age 38–39); Hong Kong
- Education: City University of Hong Kong (BA); Lingnan University (MA)
- Occupations: Actor; director
- Years active: 2011–present

Siuyea Lo Chun-yip (Chinese: 盧鎮業; born 1986/1987) is a Hong Kong actor and director best known for his roles in the drama films Suk Suk (2020) and Time Still Turns the Pages (2023), which earned him nominations for Best Supporting Actor and Best Actor in the 39th and 42nd Hong Kong Film Awards respectively.

== Biography ==
Lo was born in 1986 or 1987 to a middle-class family. Despite his parents had expressed doubts on whether he can make a living, he decided to study film and become an actor since he was still at school. He retook Hong Kong Certificate of Education Examination once and later attended the City University of Hong Kong to study creative media. He directed a politically themed short film 21 Years After in 2010. After graduating with a Bachelor of Arts in 2011, Lo simultaneously attended graduate school at Lingnan University and worked as an independent film director. He directed and produced Days After n Coming, an extended version of 21 Years After which documented about political movements in Hong Kong. The documentary was critically acclaimed and entered the 36th Hong Kong International Film Festival. Lo also received Human Rights Awards in the 12th South Taiwan Film Festival. Lo landed his first acting role in the 2011 RTHK television movie Beside(s), Happiness directed by Heiward Mak. Lo received his Master of Arts in cultural studies from the Lingnan University in 2014. He taught documentary filmmaking temporarily in universities and secondary schools.

Lo continued to direct and act in several featured films and short films after graduation, including Heiward Mak's 2014 romance film Uncertain Relationship Society. Lo befriended Mak after their frequent collaborations and joined her newfound artist agency later in 2016. Lo also starred in the 2018 political film No.1 Chung Ying Street and Mak's 2019 family drama film Fagara. In 2020, Lo received his breakout role as the Christian son of a homosexual old man in the drama film Suk Suk. He was nominated for Best Supporting Actor in the 39th Hong Kong Film Awards.

In 2023, Lo was cast in the lead role in the featured film Time Still Turns the Pages. He portrayed a school teacher who had witnessed his brother's suicide due to academic pressure and recalled his childhood trauma while trying to save a suicidal student. Lo's acting and onscreen charisma received widespread acclaim, and was nominated for Best Actor in the 42nd Hong Kong Film Awards.

== Personal life ==
After producing several politically themed films, Lo was denied entry to Macau in 2016 due to the potential "threats to the stability of the territory’s internal security". Despite being able to enter, Lo had previously been detained for questioning before the incident occurred.

As of February 2024, Lo is dating actress Fish Liew. Liew publicly announced their relationship in December 2022.

== Filmography ==
=== Film ===
==== As actor ====
Year	Title	Role	Notes/Ref.
2014	Uncertain Relationship Society	Leung Wai On (梁瑋安)	
2018	No.1 Chung Ying Street	Chi Ho / Yat Long (子豪 / 日朗)	
2019	The Murders of Oiso	Makihara	Cameo
2019	Fagara	Radish (蘿蔔)	
2020	Suk Suk	Wan (永)	
2020	My Prince Edward	Groom	
2023	Time Still Turns the Pages	Cheng Yau Chun (鄭有俊)	
2026	Night King	Prince Fung (太子峰)	

==== As director ====
Year	Title	Director	Writer	Notes/Ref.
2010	21 Years After (春夏之交)	Yes	Yes	
2011	Paradox (淹沒)	Yes	Yes	
2012	Days After n Coming (那年春夏‧之後)	Yes	Yes	
2013	Sister Kam (金妹)	Yes	Yes	

=== Television ===
Year	Title	Role	Notes/Ref.
2011	Beside(s), Happiness	Ho Yin Kwan (何彥君)	Television movie; Main role
2018	If Love Was Not Timeless	Man (阿敏)	Main role
2018	Elite Brigade IV	Lam Ka Leung (林家良)	Recurring role
2019	Haters Gonna Stay	Young man	Cameo
2022	In Geek We Trust	Tommy sir	Guest role
2023	Left On Read	Rocket (火箭)	Guest role

== Awards and nominations ==
Year	Award	Category	Work	Result	Ref.
2013	12th South Taiwan Film Festival Awards	Human Right Awards	Days After n Coming	Won	
2020	39th Hong Kong Film Awards	Best Supporting Actor	Suk Suk	Nominated	
2024	42nd Hong Kong Film Awards	Best Actor	Time Still Turns the Pages	Nominated	
2025	43rd Hong Kong Film Awards	Best Supporting Actor	Montages of a Modern Motherhood	Nominated	
