= Renci Yeung =

Hong Kong actress (born 1993/1994)

- 楊偲泳
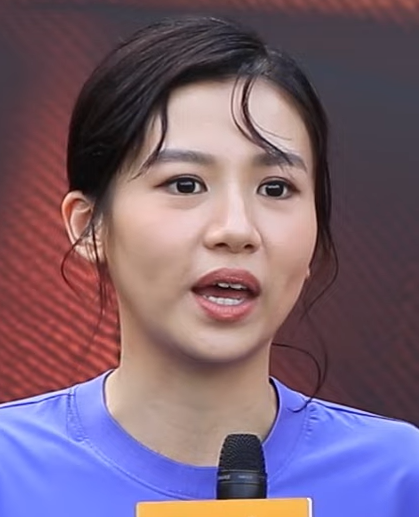
- Yeung in December 2023
- Born: Yeung Sz-wing; 1993 or 1994 (age 32–33); Hong Kong
- Education: City University of Hong Kong (AA)
- Occupation: Actress
- Years active: 2016–present

Renci Yeung Sz-wing (Chinese: 楊偲泳; born 1993/1994) is a Hong Kong actress best known for starring in anthology series The Republic (2019) and romance film The First Girl I Loved (2021). She received a nomination for Best Supporting Actress in the 42nd Hong Kong Film Awards with her performance in the crime comedy film A Guilty Conscience (2023).

== Biography ==
Yeung was born on 1993 or 1994. She attended the City University of Hong Kong and graduated with an Associate of Arts in creative media. In 2015, Yeung starred in the music video of JW's "A Life Of Contradictions" and received public attention. She joined ViuTV as an actress in 2016 and starred in ViuTV drama series Psycho Detective, Afterlife Firm, Dark City and The Republic in lead roles. In 2021, she was cast as one of the three co-leading actresses in romance comedy film Ready o/r Knot, alongside Michelle Wai and Hedwig Tam. She was cast in the lead and titular role, alongside Hedwig Tam, in homosexual-themed romance film The First Girl I Loved in the same year. Yeung and Tam portrayed a pair of students who began a lesbian love affair in a Catholic school, and the duo's performance received critical acclaim.

In 2023, Yeung landed another lead role in crime comedy film A Guilty Conscience. The film became the highest-grossing Chinese film in Hong Kong to date and Yeung received a nomination for Best Supporting Actress in the 42nd Hong Kong Film Awards with her performance. Yeung also reprised her role in Ready or Rot, the sequel of Ready o/r Knot, and starred in ViuTV drama series Tales at the Corner.

== Filmography ==
=== Film ===
| Year | Title | Role | Notes/Ref. |
|---|---|---|---|
| 2019 | Guilt by Design | Lam Tsz Ying (林子瑩) | |
| 2021 | Ready o/r Knot | Jessica Yu (余詩詠) | |
| 2021 | The First Girl I Loved | Sylvia (李芯悅) | |
| 2023 | A Guilty Conscience | Evelyn Fong (方家軍) | |
| 2023 | Ready or Rot | Jessica Yu | |
| 2023 | The Goldfinger | Lau Wing (劉詠) | |
| 2024 | Table for Six 2 | Lucy | |
| 2025 | My Best Bet | Sunny (小晴) | |
| 2025 | Smashing Frank | Chelsea | |
| 2026 | Night King | Bobo (煲煲) | |

=== Television ===
| Year | Title | Role | Notes/Ref. |
|---|---|---|---|
| 2016 | 3X1 | Lee Shun Hei (李舜希) | Guest role |
| 2017 | Psycho Detective | Lo Ka Yan (羅家欣) | Main role |
| 2018 | Afterlife Firm | Wing Cheung (張穎) | Main role |
| 2019 | Dark City | Sin (善) | Main role |
| 2019 | The Republic | Yan Chun (甄真) | Main role |
| 2020 | The Gutter | Joyce Ho (何樂兒) | Main role |
| 2020 | Single Papa | Wing | Guest role |
| 2020 | We are the Littles | Choco | Guest role |
| 2023 | Tales at the Corner | Joyce | Main role |

== Awards and nominations ==
| Year | Award | Category | Work | Result | Ref. |
|---|---|---|---|---|---|
| 2024 | 42nd Hong Kong Film Awards | Best Supporting Actress | A Guilty Conscience | Nominated | |
