= A Guilty Conscience (2023 film) =

2023 Hong Kong film by Jack Ng

- Theatrical release poster
- Traditional Chinese: 毒舌大狀
- Simplified Chinese: 毒舌大状
- Directed by: Jack Ng
- Screenplay by: Jack Ng; Terry Lam; Jay Cheung
- Produced by: Bill Kong; Ivy Ho
- Starring: Dayo Wong; Tse Kwan-ho; Louise Wong; Fish Liew; Michael Wong; Dee Ho; Renci Yeung; Adam Pak; Bowie Lam; Vincent Kok
- Cinematography: Anthony Pun
- Edited by: Chan Ki-hop
- Music by: Iris Liu; Hanz Au; Jolyon Cheung
- Production companies: Edko Films; Alibaba Pictures; The Film Development Fund; Irresistible Beta Limited
- Distributed by: Edko Films
- Release date: 21 January 2023
- Running time: 134 minutes
- Country: Hong Kong
- Language: Cantonese
- Budget: HK$22.2 million
- Box office: HK$114.2 million ($14.91 million USD)

A Guilty Conscience (Chinese: 毒舌大狀; Jyutping: duk6 sit3 daai6 zong6; lit. 'Poison-tongued Barrister') is a 2023 Hong Kong legal drama film co-written and directed by Jack Ng, in his directorial debut. The film follows the trial of a single mother wrongly charged with the murder of her daughter, and an attorney vows to clear her name. It stars an ensemble cast including Dayo Wong, Tse Kwan-ho, Louise Wong, Fish Liew, Michael Wong, Dee Ho, Renci Yeung, Adam Pak, Bowie Lam, and Vincent Kok.

A Guilty Conscience (2023 film) was released on 21 January 2023, coinciding with Chinese New Year's Eve. A Guilty Conscience received acclaim for its screenwriting, direction and acting, particularly that of Dayo Wong, Louise Wong and Tse. The film grossed HK$114,293,675 (£11.6 M) and became the highest-grossing domestic film in Hong Kong to date, surpassing the 2022 film Warriors of Future. The film was partly financed by the Hong Kong government's film development fund.

The film received 10 nominations at 42nd Hong Kong Film Awards, and won Best Film.

== Plot ==
In 2002, Adrian Lam, a former barrister-turned-magistrate recently demoted by his superior for his attitude, returns to private practice at the suggestion of his friend, senior barrister T. K. Ho. Lam obtains his first case, a child abuse case, through Ho. The defendant Jolene Tsang, a former model and single mother, is accused of assaulting her daughter, Elsa, who is now in a coma.

Lam takes over Tsang's case as her attorney, in partnership with fellow barrister Evelyn Fong, at the suggestion of her mentor Ho, and legal executive Prince. Throughout the first trial in court, they examine witness Ball Chan, a security guard in Tsang's residential area. However, Fong finds a loophole in Chan's testimony. Later that night, Elsa wakes from the coma. Lam, Fong and Prince come to hospital in order to record testimony from Elsa, but she dies from a cerebral bleed after revealing her mother is innocent. Tsang is then charged with manslaughter.

Lam finds Tsang's lover, Desmond Chung, who acknowledged his presence at Tsang's residence that night. Lam enlists Desmond as the key witness in the trial, but Fong worries about Desmond's wife, Victoria Chung, daughter of a powerful tycoon and an enemy of Tsang, who could threaten the case. At the final trial, due to Lam's careless decision to not obtain formal written testimony, Desmond suddenly changes his testimony, resulting in Tsang being sentenced to 17 years in prison. Condemned by Fong, Lam realizes his mistake and falls into despair. After his former classmate and now ICAC assistant commissioner Luk finds and encourages him, Lam decides to move his chambers to Mong Kok, in an effort to redeem himself by helping those in need.

Two years later, Ball Chan, who disappeared after the trial, returns to Hong Kong due to terminal illness and takes his own life. In his suicide note, he confesses he had wronged Tsang by lying to the court. Lam, now determined to have Tsang's conviction reversed, reconciles with Fong, who forgives him with Ho's encouragement.

The High Court sets aside the conviction and orders a retrial. However, the Department of Justice decides to upgrade Tsang's charge to murder and gives the prosecution brief to Kam Yuen-Shan, a senior criminal barrister. Chan's note is deemed insufficient evidence, prompting Lam and Fong to revisit Tsang's residence and reconstruct the case. The two realise that Victoria had visited the residence before Desmond's arrival, while Tsang was asleep in the garden.

Lam decides to wiretap Victoria's residence and trick her into confessing to the crime. Lam then plays the recording in court in an effort to sway the jury, to Kam's objection. Meanwhile, the Chungs' legal adviser and longtime friend, barrister James Tung, takes action against Lam, having him arrested for wiretapping.

Lam manages to still arrive in court on time thanks to the Prince, who helps him meet a friend in the police force who grants him bail. Lam forms a plan with Fong in the final trial to make Tung and the Chungs confess to the truth. Kam also agrees to the plan after revealing to Lam that he knows the truth. At the trial, both Lam and Kam highlight inconsistencies in Desmond's testimony and suggest that, based on new evidence, it was Desmond and Victoria who murdered Elsa; Victoria had crushed Elsa's head against a table corner, resulting in her cerebral bleeding, leaving Desmond to feed her water to accelerate her death and cover up the crime. Tsang breaks into tears after learning the truth about her lover and is found not guilty and released. The Chungs and Tung are then arrested by the ICAC, led by Luk, and the police for their crimes.

Lam, Fong, Prince and Tsang celebrate their victory, and Lam decides to partner with Fong and Prince to form a new set of chambers while continuing to help those in need.

== Cast ==
- Dayo Wong as Adrian Lam, a barrister who acts as the defence counsel in Jolene Tsang's case.
- Tse Kwan-ho as Kam Yuen-Shan SC, a senior criminal barrister prosecuting on fiat for the Department of Justice in the case against Tsang.
- Louise Wong as Jolene Tsang, the defendant in Lam's murder case.
- Fish Liew as Victoria Chung, wife of Desmond Chung and daughter of a powerful tycoon
- Adam Pak as Desmond Cheung, husband of Victoria Chung
- Michael Wong as James Tung SC, a retired senior barrister and a longtime friend of the Chung family
- Dee Ho as Prince, a legal executive to Adrian Lam
- Renci Yeung as Evelyn Fong, a barrister working in T.K. Ho's chambers
- Bowie Lam as Luk Ting-Hang, an ICAC assistant commissioner and Lam's classmate during law school
- Vincent Kok as T.K. Ho, friend of Adrian and superior of Evelyn Fong
- Sheldon Lo as Ben, a solicitor and assistant to James Tung
- Ranson Ma as Dr. Choi, a coroner and expert witness

== Production ==
Screenwriter Jack Ng has aspired to be a director since his graduation from Hong Kong Academy of Performing Arts in 2000. However, he decided to turn to screenwriting which lasted for more than 20 years. After co-writing Anita with writer/director Longman Leung, producer Bill Kong invited Ng to make his directorial debut feature. With a mid-range budget and co-funding by the Hong Kong Film Development Fund, Ng came up a theme idea of court drama, and both Ng and Kong cast Dayo Wong as the lead actor.

Filming began on May 23, 2022, and wrapped up on July 2, 2022. The court scenes were mainly filmed in North Kowloon Magistracy, which has been a historic building since it ceased operation.

== Awards and nominations ==
Award	Date of ceremony	Category	Recipient(s)	Result	Ref.
Golden Rooster Awards	November 4, 2023	Best Picture	A Guilty Conscience	Nominated	
Golden Rooster Awards	November 4, 2023	Best Directorial Debut	Jack Ng	Nominated	
Golden Rooster Awards	November 4, 2023	Best Writing	Jack Ng, Jay Cheung, and Terry Lam	Nominated	
Golden Rooster Awards	November 4, 2023	Best Music	Liao Tongchen, Ou Leheng, Zhang Jianren	Nominated	
Hong Kong Film Awards	April 14, 2024	Best Film	A Guilty Conscience	Won	
Hong Kong Film Awards	April 14, 2024	Best Director	Jack Ng	Nominated	
Hong Kong Film Awards	April 14, 2024	Best Screenplay	Jack Ng, Jay Cheung, and Terry Lam	Nominated	
Hong Kong Film Awards	April 14, 2024	Best Actor	Dayo Wong	Nominated	
Hong Kong Film Awards	April 14, 2024	Best Actress	Louise Wong	Nominated	
Hong Kong Film Awards	April 14, 2024	Best Supporting Actor	Tse Kwan-ho	Nominated	
Hong Kong Film Awards	April 14, 2024	Best Supporting Actress	Renci Yeung	Nominated	
Hong Kong Film Awards	April 14, 2024	Best Supporting Actress	Fish Liew	Nominated	
Hong Kong Film Awards	April 14, 2024	Best Editing	Chan Ki Hop	Nominated	
Hong Kong Film Awards	April 14, 2024	Best New Director	Jack Ng	Nominated	
