= Mama-san =

In East Asia, a woman in charge of a drinking establishment

A mama-san or mamasan is usually a woman in a position of authority, especially one in charge of a geisha house or bar or nightclub in East Asia.

In Southeast Asia, a mamasan is a woman who works in a supervisory role in certain establishments, typically those related to drinking places. Papa-san may refer to a man in a similar position.

The term is a combination of the English word "Mama" and the Japanese suffix -san which is a polite honorific attached to a person's name or title, coined by U.S. soldiers in Japan after World War II. This probably has had some influence in its spread to other Southeast Asian countries.

It is considered extremely rude to refer to a woman in charge of a respectable restaurant or inn as mama-san. The proper title for her is okami or okami-san.

In Thailand and the Philippines, mamasan is commonly used to describe a woman who manages the female workers in bars and brothels.

To at least some extent, these can be considered the local equivalents of a madam, although the conventions of bar fine prostitution in Asia are quite different from those of street or brothel prostitution in western countries.

Mamasan (sometimes abbreviated MMS) is also used in the United States to refer to the woman managing the staff of Asian massage parlors.
