= Dayo Wong =

Hong Kong actor and comedian (born 1960)

- 黃子華
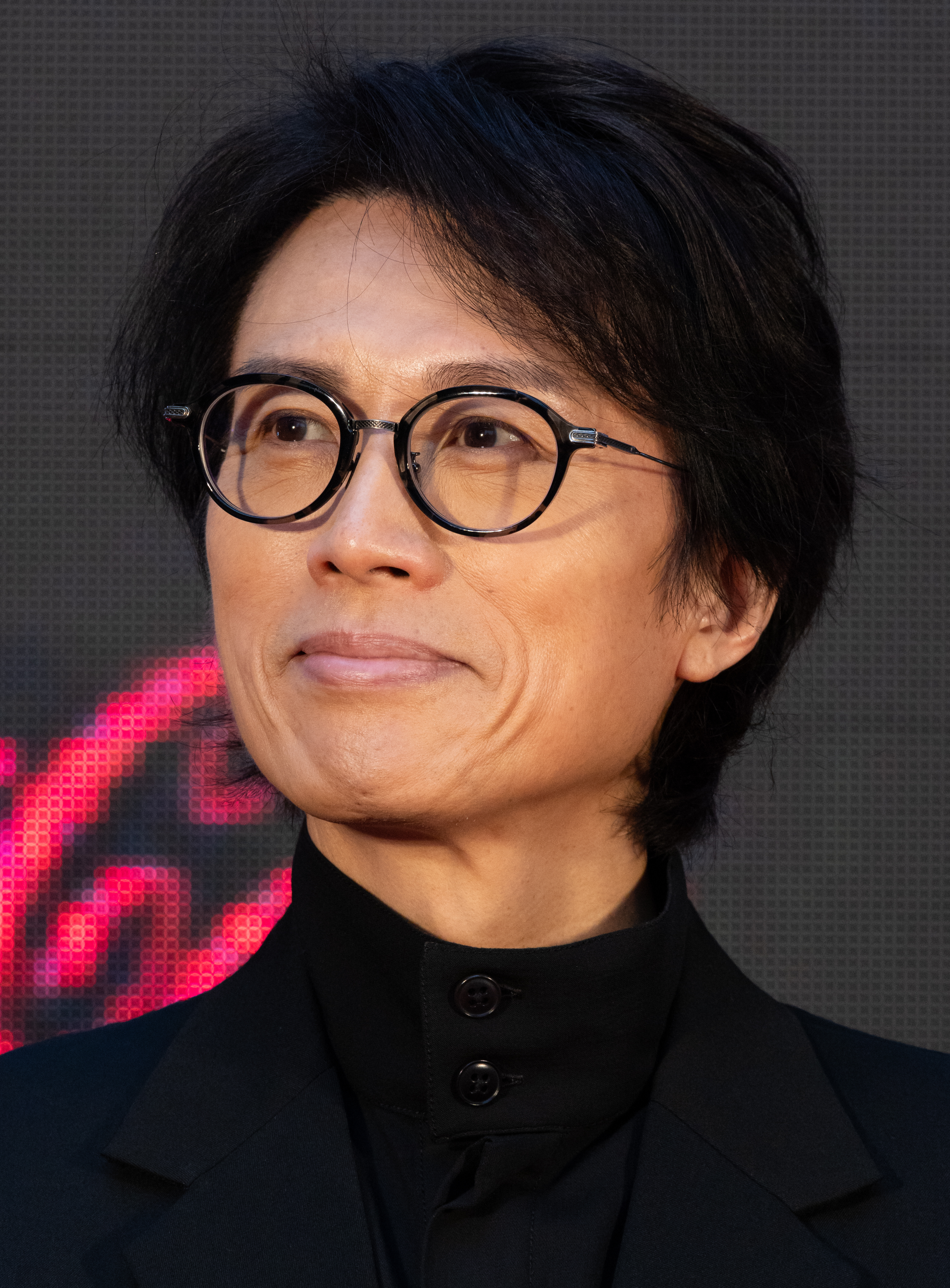
- Wong at the 37th Tokyo International Film Festival in 2024
- Born: 5 September 1960 (age 65); British Hong Kong
- Education: University of Alberta (BPhil)
- Occupations: Actor; Standup comedian
- Years active: 1984–present
- Awards: TVB Anniversary Awards –: Best Actor; 2013 Bounty Lady; My Favourite Television Character; 2000 War of the Genders

Chinese name
- Traditional Chinese: 黃子華
- Simplified Chinese: 黄子华
Transcriptions
Standard Mandarin
- Hanyu Pinyin: Huáng Zǐhuá
Yue: Cantonese
- Jyutping: wong4 zi2 waa4
- Musical career
- Genres: Observational comedy
- Label: EMI

Dayo Wong Tze-wah (born 5 September 1960) is a Hong Kong actor and comedian. A pioneer of stand-up comedy in the Chinese-speaking world, he is known for his stadium-scale performances integrating political satire and social commentary, including 26 sold-out shows at the Hong Kong Coliseum for his farewell performance in 2018. His notable films include A Guilty Conscience (2023), The Last Dance (2024), and Night King (2026), which consecutively broke the record for the highest grossing domestic films in history and currently sit as the top three highest-grossing Hong Kong films of all time.

== Biography ==
Wong gained a bachelor's degree in philosophy from the University of Alberta in Canada.

He began his career in the entertainment industry in Hong Kong in 1984, but he is best known for his works in live stand-up comedy which he started performing regularly since 1990. Since then he has starred in TV dramas and films and has recorded several albums.

=== Television ===
Dayo had his TVB TV series debut in 1999, acting as "Lai Sam" in Justice Sung 2. A year later, he reached a milestone as a lazy law firm assistant in War of the Genders, winning the "My Favourite Television Character Award" in 2002. He won two awards in 2004: the My Favourite On-Screen Partners (with Ada Choi in Catch the Uncatchable) and again, the My Favourite Television Character Award (also in Catch the Uncatchable).

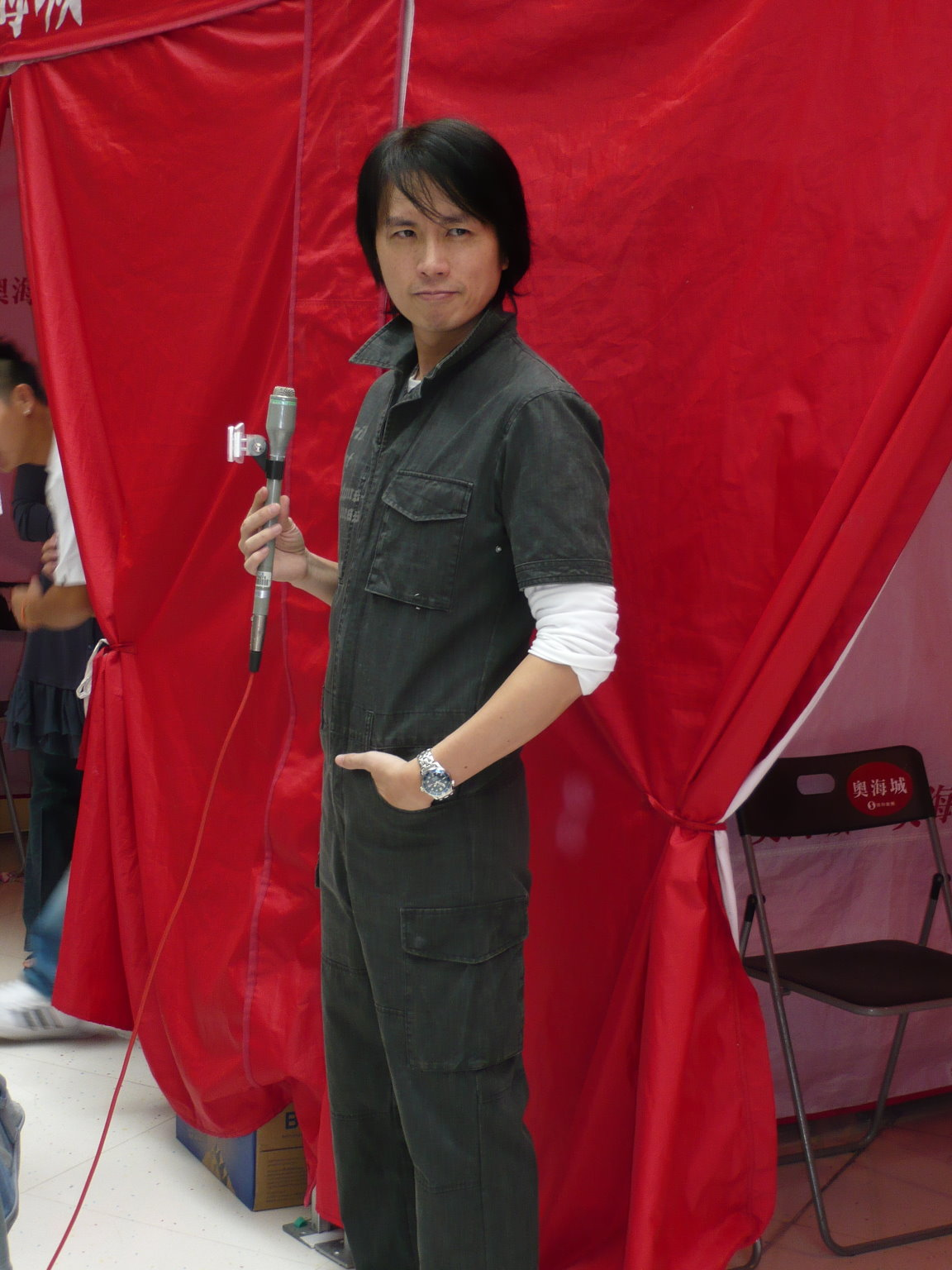
Wong in 2007

He was nominated for the TV King Award in 2007 and 2009. He was finally crowned as TV King with Bounty Lady in 2013. To Dayo, the award was an accumulative result of his TVB dramas. In that year, Julian Cheung started as the clear favourite of the audience due to his popularity in Triumph in the Skies 2. Though Chilam ended up winning the Most Popular Male Character, he sounded disappointed in his acceptance speech (the price is widely recognised as a consolation prize to The Best Actor Award). Chilam did not stay behind the ceremony for the TVB official interview. He explained that he was not informed to stay behind for any interview. The discord rumours between Chilam and Dayo begin to spread out widely. However, the rumour was shot down when Chilam surprised Dayo by his sudden appearance at a meal gathering of the Bounty Lady.

=== Stand-up ===
Besides the TVB drama career, Dayo is also well known to be a stand-up comedian. He introduced stand-up comedy to Hong Kong and is well known for including a lot of political and philosophical content in his sets. "Hong Kong's housing issue is absolutely ridiculous. I have discussed this in my stand-up shows too. Hong Kong residents need to have 13 to 14 times their current annual salary to finally be qualified for home ownership." said the comedian. He has performed in Hong Kong, Australia, Canada, and the United States.

=== Film ===
Initially Wong's film career was not as successful as his TV and standup careers. When asked the reasons behind the disparity, he explained that his ultimate goal is to look for something new in his movies. His visions make his work good to watch, but it is not good enough to attract people to pay for a cinema ticket. Additionally, he hates doing promotion for his work. That disparity ended, however, beginning in 2018 when Wong began starring in a string of very successful box office hits. Those included Agent Mr Chan (2018) and The Grand Grandmaster (2020), both the highest grossing domestic films of their year in Hong Kong. He then starred in Table for Six (2022), which became the second highest grossing domestic film ever in Hong Kong at that time. Not to be defeated, he subsequently starred in A Guilty Conscience (2023) and The Last Dance (2024), which both became the highest-grossing domestic films in Hong Kong history, with the latter overtaking the former in 2024. He also starred in the 2026 film Night King, which once again broke box office records and became the third highest-grossing domestic film, making the current top three highest-grossing Hong Kong films all starring Wong.

== Filmography ==
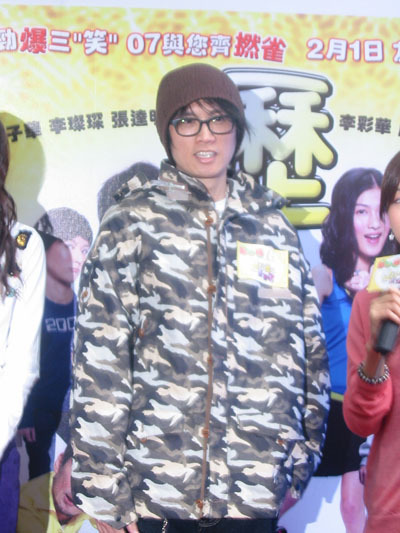
Wong at a promotional event for House of Mahjong.

=== Live shows ===
Year	Name	Remark
1990	娛樂圈血肉史	-
1991	色情家庭	-
1992	跟住去邊度	-
1994	末世財神	-
1995	棟篤笑雙打之玩無可玩	Cheung Tat-ming
1997	秋前算帳	-
1997	殺出廚房	
1998	Free Men Show (鬚根Show)	Cheung Tat-ming, Francis Ng
1999	拾下拾下拾年棟篤笑	
2000	Free Men Show 2 (鬚根Show 2)	Cheung Tat-ming, Francis Ng
2000	男親女愛舞台劇	
March 2003	冇炭用	-
October 2006	兒童不宜	-
December 2007	越大鑊越快樂	-
September 2008	男磨坊	
August to September 2009	嘩眾取寵	-
November 2010	娛樂圈血肉史 II	-
June to July 2011	咁愛咁做	
February 2012	野豬	
October 2012	洗燥	
October 2014	唔黐線唔正常	
July to August 2016	前度	Fala Chen
June 2018	金盆啷口	

=== Films ===
Year	English title
1992	The Magic Touch
1993	Two of a Kind; Pink Bomb; No. 1 3rd Ave; Even Mountains Meet
1994	I've Got You, Babe!!! Mr. Sardine; Long and Winding Road; Oh! My Three Guys; From Zero to Hero; New Tenant; Born innocent
1995	Once in a Life Time; Wind Beneath the Wings; The Meaning of Life; Spider Woman; Thunderbolt; Only Fools Fall in Love; The Dan That Doesn't Exist
1996	Satan Returns; Top Banana Club; 13 July; All of a Sudden; Love and Sex Among the Ruins; Big Bullet
1997	24 Hrs Ghost Story; Walk In; Legend of the Wolf; Those Were the Days; Tamagotchi; Love, Amoeba Style; 97 Aces Go Places; The Wedding Days; My Dad is a Jerk
1998	F*** /Off
2000	What Is A Good Teacher; Don't Look Back or You'll Be Sorry; Titanic (dub)
2001	The Emperor's New Groove (dub); Let's Sing Along
2002	Fighting to Survive; Scooby Doo (dub)
2004	Leave Me Alone
2005	Teacher in University
2006	Lethal Ninja; Over the Hedge (dub); Nothing is Impossible
2007	Zhui Bu; House of Mahjong
2014	Golden Chicken 3
2014	Temporary Family
2015	Secret Treasure
2016	Zootopia (dub)
2017	Earth: One Amazing Day (dub)
2018	Agent Mr Chan
2020	The Grand Grandmaster
2022	Table for Six
2023	A Guilty Conscience
2024	The Last Dance
2026	Night King

=== TV series ===
Year	Title	Role	Network	TVB Anniversary Awards
1999	Justice Sung II 狀王宋世傑II	Lai Sam	TVB	
2000	War of Genders 男親女愛	Yu Lok-ting	TVB	My Favourite Television Character
2001	Unusual Citizen 非常公民	Puyi	Mainland Chinese production	
2004	To Catch the Uncatchable 棟篤神探	Mok Jok-dung	TVB	My Favourite On-Screen Partners (Dramas); My Favourite Television Character
2005	Hail the Judge 新九品芝麻官	Song Shijie	China Mainland	
2005	The Great Adventure 大冒險家	Pak Wut	ATV	
2006	Loving Insurance 情愛保險	Tang Tianshou	Mainland Chinese production	
2007	Men Don't Cry 奸人堅	Ho Kei-kin	TVB	Best Actor Nomination (Top 20); My Favourite Male Character Nomination (Top 5)
2009	You're Hired 絕代商驕	Mak Tai-song	TVB	Best Actor Nomination (Top 5); My Favourite Male Character Nomination (Top 5)
2013	Bounty Lady; My盛Lady	Heung Kwong-nam	TVB	Best Actor

== Discography ==
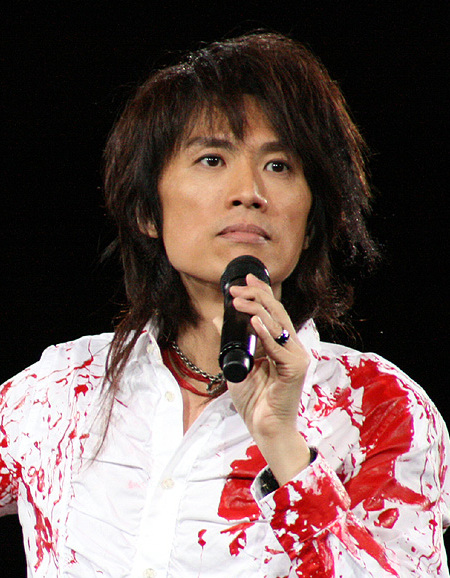
Wong performing in 2010

=== Albums ===
Year	Title
1998	鬚根Sound
1999	關老三
2000	我有小小強
2001	Experience
2005	哈痞（痞：音鄙，happy）

==== Compilations ====
Year	Title
November 1999	華納99最好精選
December 1999	華納千禧世紀好精選
October 2000	華納天碟2000
September 2001	關不掉的聲音— 前途萬里行
October 2001	華納23周年紀念精選（華納群星）
September 2003	1:99電影行動（原裝導演加長版）
September 2004	愛唱主題曲 Theme Songs（香港群星）— 衰邊個

=== Singles ===
Year	Title
2006	知彼不知己
2007	奸人堅
2009	冇問題
2013	My盛Lady

== Accolades ==
Year	Award	Category	Recipient	Result	Ref.
2024	Hong Kong Film Awards	Best Actor	A Guilty Conscienc	Nominated	
