= Louise Wong =

Hong Kong actress and model

- 王丹妮
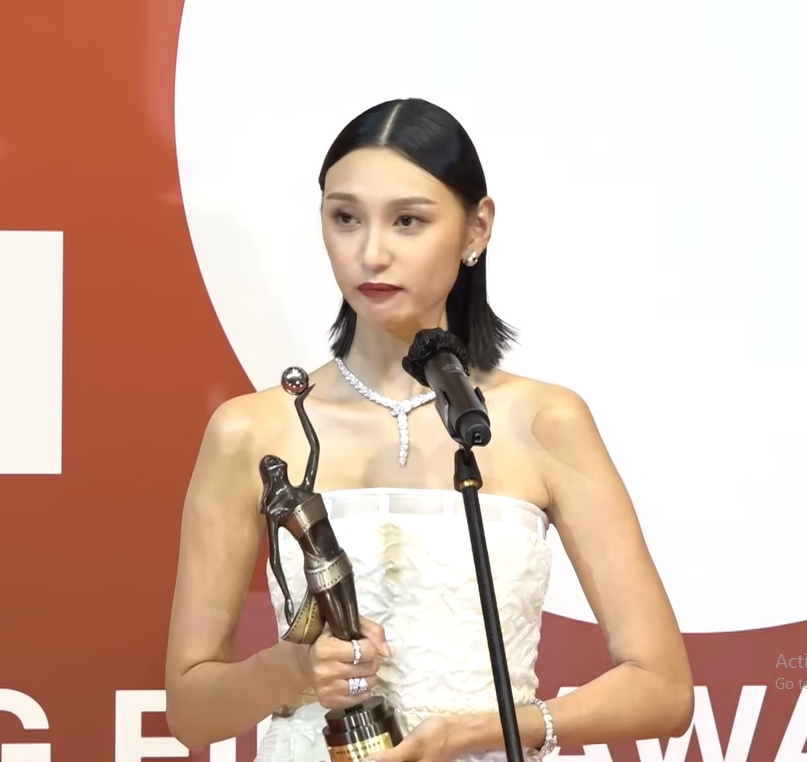
- Wong in 2022
- Born: Wong Tan-ni; 3 July 1990 (age 36); Qingdao, Shandong, China
- Occupations: Actress; model
- Years active: 2007–present
- Spouse: Sheldon Lo (m. 2020)
- Children: 1
- Awards: Hong Kong Film Awards – Best New Performer; 2022 Anita

Louise Wong Tan-ni (Chinese: 王丹妮; born 3 July 1990) is a Hong Kong actress and model. She was born in Shandong, China, then she moved to Hong Kong at a young age. She is best known for her role as Cantopop singer Anita Mui in the 2022 biographical musical drama film Anita, which earned her Best New Performer winning and Best Actress nomination at the 40th Hong Kong Film Awards.

== Filmography ==
=== Film ===
Year	Film	Role	Notes/Ref.
2021	Anita	Anita Mui	Leading role
2023	A Guilty Conscience	Jolene Tsang	Main role
2025	Hit N Fun	Elsa Lam	Main role
2026	Night King	Coco	Main role
2026	Cold War 1994	Jodie Yuen	Main role

=== Drama ===
Year	English title	Chinese title	Role	Network	Notes/Ref.
2023	Left On Read	那年盛夏，我們綻放如花	Jessica Shek	ViuTV	Special Appearance

=== Music video appearances ===
Year	Title
2022	Leon Lai - 一生幸福

== Awards and nominations ==
Award	Year	Nominee / Work	Category	Result	Ref.
Asian Film Awards	2023	Anita	Best Newcomer	Nominated	
Hong Kong Film Award	2022	Anita	Best New Performer	Won	
Hong Kong Film Award	2022	Anita	Best Actress	Nominated	
Hong Kong Film Award	2024	A Guilty Conscience	Best Actress	Nominated	
Golden Rooster Awards	2022	Anita	Best Actress	Nominated	
