= Calvin Choi =

Hong Kong writer and film critic (born 1974/1975)

- 蔡蔚駿
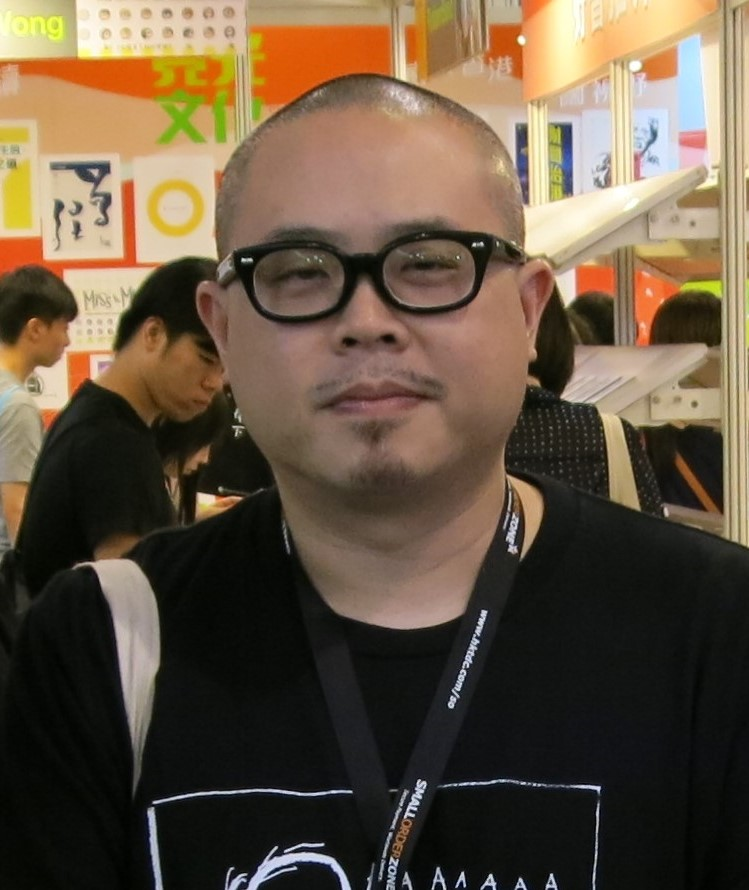
- Choi in July 2014
- Born: Choi Wai-chun; 1974 or 1975 (age 50–51); Hong Kong
- Education: Chinese University of Hong Kong (BA, MA)
- Occupations: Writer; Film critic; Radio host
- Years active: 1997–present

Calvin Choi Wai-chun (Chinese: 蔡蔚駿; born 1974/1975), also known by his pen name Fatmoonba (月巴氏), is a Hong Kong writer, film critic, and radio host. He currently writes columns for am730 and Hong Kong Economic Times, and is a co-host of Commercial Radio Hong Kong's 903 Open Box.

== Early life and education ==
Choi was born in 1974 or 1975, and grew up in Shatin. He developed a passion for wuxia novels at a young age and aspired to be a comic book artist, but abandoned that dream after scoring an F in visual arts on his Hong Kong Certificate of Education Examination. He began writing novels in Form 2, inspired by Ni Kuang's Wisely Series, and won first prize in the 24th Youth Literary Awards in 1996 with his novella Teenager. After graduating from matriculation in 1994 with an A in Chinese literature, he continued his studies at the Chinese University of Hong Kong, majoring in history.

== Career ==
In June 1997, right after graduating from university, Choi joined a newspaper as a supplement journalist. Over the following years, he worked for a total of eight media outlets, including am730, U Magazine, Jet Magazine, City Magazine, and Apple Daily, primarily focusing on films. He also wrote a film reviews column for am730, which he described as rarely covering mainstream movies and instead offering a perspective rooted in the experiences of a "regular movie lover". He wrote a wuxia novel and initially planned to publish it in 2011, but the project was ultimately scrapped. In 2013, he published Tearing Tickets and Cutting Chairs, a collection of his film reviews. Yan Ho-shun, reviewing for am730, called the collection "a valuable movie guide", praising Choi's personal and accessible style in dissecting classic films. Choi gained public recognition in 2014 for launching his column "Romantic Fatmoonba on Female Stars" (浪漫月巴睇女星), which included interviews and commentaries about women in the entertainment industry from an unconventional perspective, as he found mainstream media often focused on female celebrities' appearances while neglecting their intrinsic qualities.

In 2015, Choi published his first novel, No Longer Hero, drawing inspiration from superhero comics and Osamu Dazai's 1948 novel No Longer Human. The following year, he co-authored a graphic novel, Reverse Warring States, with Mak Tin-kit, set in the Warring States Period. He also enrolled in a Master of Arts in philosophy at the Chinese University of Hong Kong, where he realized his interest in philosophy after taking an introductory course during his undergraduate studies. He graduated in 2017. That same year, Choi began his career as a radio host, stepping in for a friend on Commercial Radio Hong Kong's talk show On a Clear Day. He made recurring appearances on the program for the next three years and launched his own show 903 Open Box starting 2021. In 2018, he published another collection of film reviews titled Seen, featuring reviews of lesser-known Hong Kong films. Ching Kwan, reviewing for HK01, described the book as "a brilliant piece", praising its interesting selection of materials and Choi's candid, engaging writing style that provides insightful commentary on films. In September 2018, he took a hiatus to work on a book about lyricist Richard Lam. In August 2023, after the magazine he worked for ceased physical publication, Choi transitioned to writing columns for the online versions of media outlets. He currently writes columns for am730 and Hong Kong Economic Times.

== Bibliography ==
Year	Title	Original title	Publisher	Ref.
2013	Tearing Tickets and Cutting Chairs	搣飛割凳	Steps Publications	
2015	No Longer Hero	超人間失格	Today Publications	
2016	Reverse Warring States	逆戰國	Today Publications	
2018	Seen	看了	Today Publications	
2019	Richard Lam	林振強	Zhonghua Book Company	
2021	Amusing Ourselves to Death Yet?	娛樂已死未	Humming Publishing	
