= William Kong =

Hong Kong film producer (born 1953)

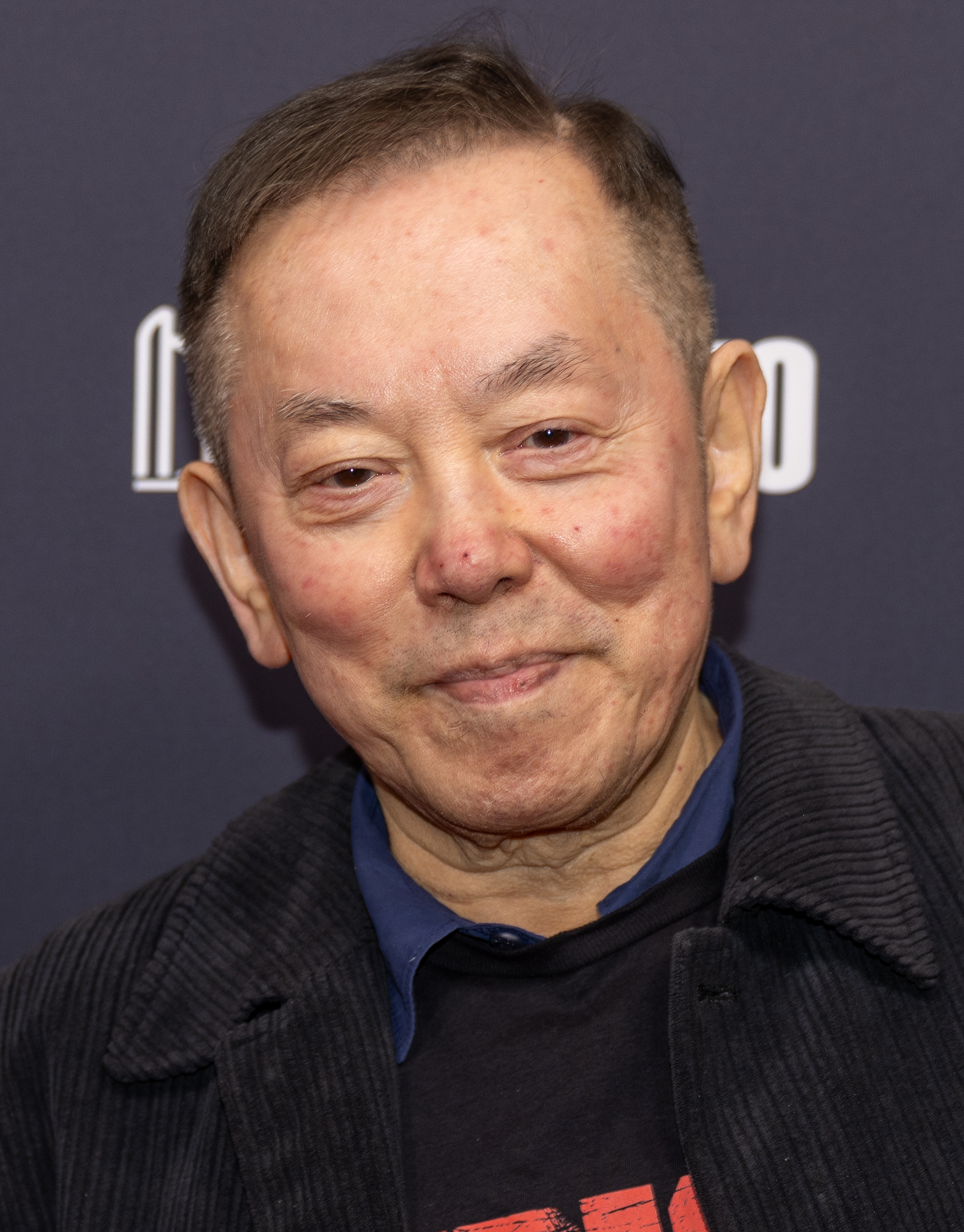
- Kong in 2025
- Born: 1953 (age 72–73); Hong Kong
- Awards: Hong Kong Film Awards – Best Film; 2001 Crouching Tiger, Hidden Dragon; 2024 A Guilty Conscience; Best Asian Film; 2006 Riding Alone for Thousands of Miles; 2008 Lust, Caution Golden Horse Awards – Best Film; 2000 Crouching Tiger, Hidden Dragon; 2007 Lust, Caution

William Kong Chi-keung, sometimes credited as Bill Kong (simplified Chinese: 江志强; traditional Chinese: 江志強; pinyin: Jiāng Zhìqiáng; Jyutping: Gong^{1} Zi^{3} Koeng^{4}; born 1953), is a Hong Kong film producer known for his active role in the Hong Kong film industry and international co-productions. He is most famous for co-producing the wuxia film Crouching Tiger, Hidden Dragon (2000), which earned him an Academy Award nomination for Best Picture as well as a BAFTA Award for Best Film.

He co-produced the historical drama war film The Flowers of War, directed by Zhang Yimou. Among his other films are Crossing Hennessy (2010) Rise of the Legend (2014), Monster Hunt (2015), Monster Hunt 2 (2018) and The Whistleblower (2019). Monster Hunt at the time of its release was the highest grossing film in Chinese history. His producer credits include Zhang Yimou's Hero, House of Flying Daggers and Curse of the Golden Flower; and Ang Lee's Lust, Caution.

Bill Kong is the executive producer of the live-action remake of Disney's 1998 animated movie Mulan (2020). He is the producer of the biographical musical drama film Anita about the late Cantopop star Anita Mui.
