= Tse Kwan-ho =

Hong Kong actor (born 1963)

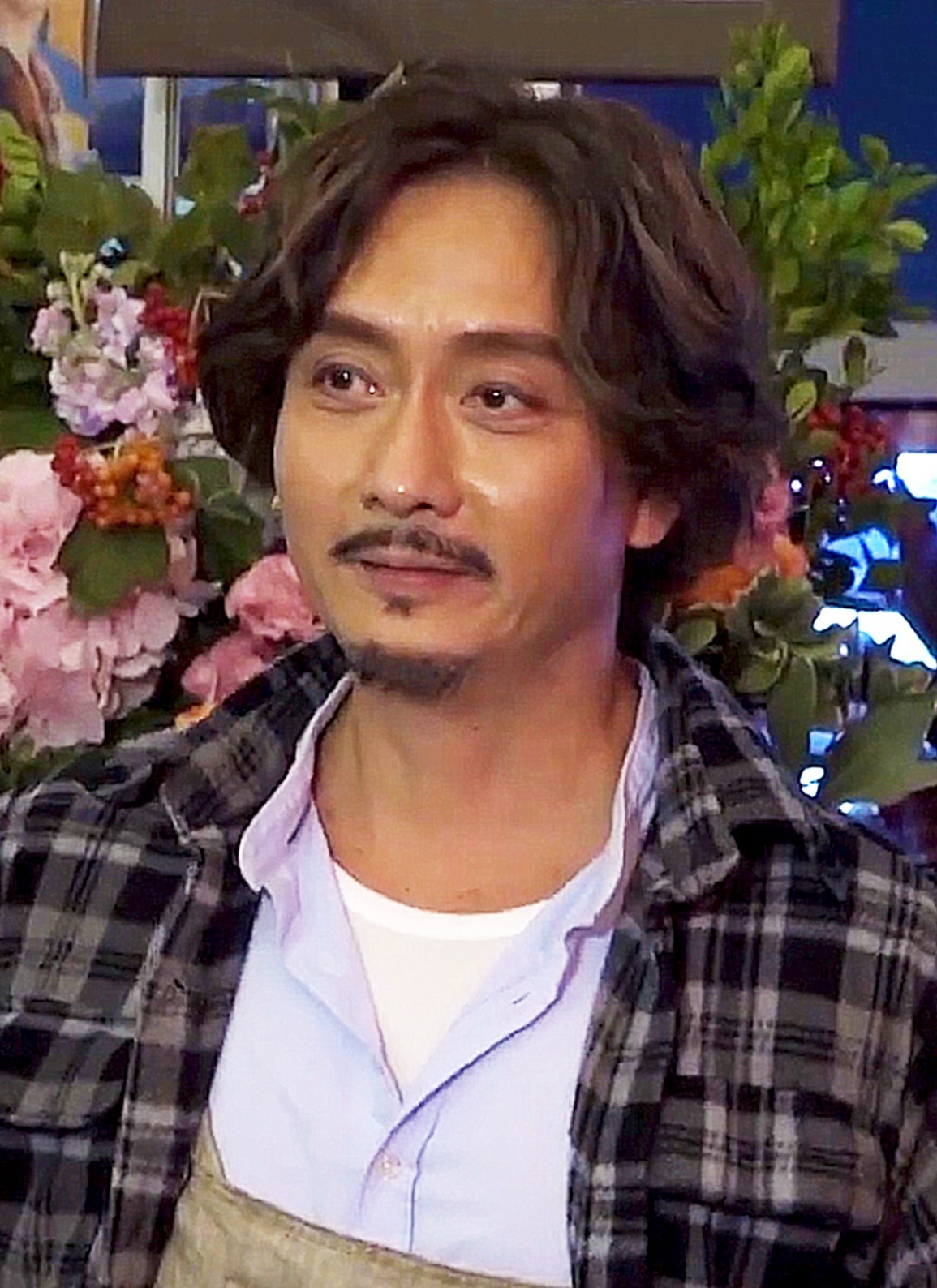
- Tse in 2019
- Born: 23 March 1963 (age 63); Hong Kong
- Occupation: Actor
- Years active: 1989–present

Chinese name
- Traditional Chinese: 謝君豪
- Simplified Chinese: 谢君豪
Transcriptions
Standard Mandarin
- Hanyu Pinyin: Xiè Jūnháo
Yue: Cantonese
- Jyutping: Ze6 Gwan1hou4
- Musical career
- Also known as: Tze Kwan-ho; Xie Jun-hao; Gardner Tse

Tse Kwan-ho (born 23 March 1963) is a Hong Kong actor, professionally also known as Gardner Tse. Originally a nurse, Tse Kwan-ho rose to prominence in the stage play The Mad Phoenix (Chinese: 南海十三郎), this was later remade into a feature film of the same name, and for which Tse won Best Leading Actor in the 34th Golden Horse Awards. Following The Mad Phoenix Tse went on to become a full-time actor and has since appeared in stage, television, film and radio serial productions.

== Career ==
Tse graduated from Hong Kong Academy for Performing Arts in 1989, he joined the Hong Kong Repertory Theatre and was with them for the next eight years. In 1997 he joined Raymond To and Clifton To's Springtime Stage Productions Limited and appeared in "Pygmalion" and "Magic is the Moonlight". He is a prolific film, television and stage actor.

In 2023, he received the Best Actor in a Leading Role award at the 7th Chinese Theatre Awards for his performance in "The Top Restaurant", which is a production of the Hong Kong Repertory Theatre.

== Filmography ==
=== Film ===
Year	English title	Original title	Role	Notes/Ref.
1989	The Bachelor's Swan Song	再見王老五		
1994	I Have a Date with Spring	我和春天有個約會	Danny	
1995	The Chinese Feast	金玉滿堂		
1995	The Umbrella Story	人間有情		
1996	Tristar	大三元		
1997	Final Justice	最後判決		
1997	The Mad Phoenix	南海十三郎	Kong Yue-kau	
1998	Nude Fear	追兇20年	Wong Wing-nin	
1998	The Lord of Hangzhou	杭州王爺	Mei Chi	
1999	Ordinary Heroes	千言萬語	Yau Ming-foon	
2000	There Is Love in Life	生有可戀		
2001	The Tree	孩子·树	Xie Wenguang	
2002	Possessed	奪魄勾魂	Henry Yeung	
2002	Memento	35米厘兇心人	Dr. Tse	
2003	Bless the Child	某年某月某日	Sean	
2004	The Miracle Box	天作之盒	Albert Lau	
2005	Mob Sister	阿嫂		
2006	The Tokyo Trial	東京審判	Yuichi Kitano	
2007	A Night Surprise	一夜驚情	Chan Muk-kin	
2007	A Promise	笛声何处	Au-yeung San-dek	
2008	A Decade of Love	十分鍾情	husband	Segment 1: "Old Peak Road" (舊山頂道)
2008	Operation at Dawn	黎明行動	He Fei	
2009	Chinese Food	蟹蟹侬	Mr. Wu	
2010	Just Another Pandora's Box	越光寶盒	Agent Smith	
2010	Wind Blast	西风烈		
2011	72 Heroes	英雄喋血	Pan Dawei	
2011	The Land with No Boundary	无界之地		
2011	The Purple House	紫宅	Shen Yang	
2012	Young Blood	青春搏击		
2012	Sky Love	恋爱三万英尺	Xie Hao	
2013	Lift to Hell	电梯惊魂	Ouyang Ke	
2013	The Stolen Years	被偷走的那五年	Philip Zhang	
2013	Princess Show	公主的诱惑	Brother Hao	
2014	Wonder Mama	媽咪俠	Kok Ka-ming	
2015	Full Strike	全力扣殺	Ng Kau-chun	
2015	Midnight Garage	三更車庫	Mr. Bai	
2015	Tomb Mystery	墓穴迷城	Gu Dexuan	
2016	The Crabby Encounter of Love	爱的蟹逅		
2017	All My Goddess	女人永遠是對的		
2017	Guilty of Mind	心理罪	Meng Yang	
2017	In Your Dreams	以青春的名義		
2018	A Beautiful Moment	我的情敵女婿		
2019	I Love You, You're Perfect, Now Change!	你咪理，我愛你！		
2020	Find Your Voice	熱血合唱團		
2020	Shock Wave 2	拆彈專家2	Ma Sai-kwan	
2021	Drifting	濁水漂流	Master	
2022	Warriors of Future	明日戰記	Dr. Chan Chong-Chung	
2023	Where the Wind Blows	風再起時	Ng Cheuk-ho	
2023	A Guilty Conscience	毒舌大狀	Kam Yuen-Shan	
2024	Table for Six 2	飯戲攻心2	Sixth Uncle	
2026	Night King	夜王	Mr. Yiu	
2026	Cold War 1994	寒戰1994	Poon Chun-hang	

=== Television series ===
Year	English title	Original title	Role	Notes/Ref.
2000	My Date with a Vampire II	我和殭屍有個約會II	Larry	
2000	So, the King of Beggars	武狀元蘇燦	So Chan	
2000	Anywhere but Here	妳想的愛	Ka Chung-wai	
2001	True Love	嫁錯媽	Kwok Man-chung	
2001	Everyone Come Look	都來看	Xu Wenchang	
2002	Book and Sword, Gratitude and Revenge	書劍恩仇錄	Yu Yutong	
2003	Heroes of the Sui and Tang Dynasties	隋唐英雄傳	Emperor Yang of Sui	
2003	Thunder Cops	暴風刑警	Fok Tin-leung	
2003	The Second Spring	第二春	Du Lei	
2004	Dream of Colours	下一站彩虹	Nick Yau	
2004	Bloody Lotus	鐵血蓮花	Lin Weiliang	
2004	Devil's Blues	叛逆战队	Yejun	
2005	Chinese Paladin	仙劍奇俠傳	Mo Yixi	
2005	The Little Fairy	天外飛仙	Lao Xinrong	
2006	To Live to Love	长恨歌	Cheng Shidi	
2007	King Qian in Wuyue	吳越錢王	Emperor Taizong of Song	
2007	The Song of Youth	青春之歌	Yu Yongze	
2007	City of Heroes	記憶之城	Zhu Jinmo	
2007	The Best Time	最好的時光	Lu Xiaomao	
2008	The Shadow Fox	狐步諜影	Tan Na	
2008	Gunfire at the Secret Bureau	保密局的槍聲	Zhang Zhongnian	
2008	Mandarin Duck River	鸳鸯河	Wei Jianqing	
2009	The Eve of the Nation's Founding	開國前夜	Jiang Shifei	
2010	Fourteenth Floor	十四楼	Xie Jue	
2010	The Doctors	医者仁心	Zhong Lixing	
2010	The Legend of Yang Guifei	楊貴妃傳奇	Yang Xuangui	
2010	The Men of Justice	法網群英	Henry Chung Kin-hang	
2011	Qingmang	青盲	Chen Wenhai	
2011	The Soul of the National Protection Army	護國軍魂傳奇	Yuan Keding	
2011	Women Soldiers of the New Fourth Army	新四軍女兵	Pan Wenhu	
2011	The Fragrant Grass Beauty	香草美人	Linghu Tao	
2012	The Legend of the Twin Brothers	風雲傳奇	Pu Feng; Pu Yun	
2012	The Sinister Love of Mother and Son	血雨母子情		
2012	Baby's War	宝贝战争	Zhao Hui	
2012	Schemes of a Mother	娘心計	Tie Jun; He Wenda	
2013	Mao Zedong	毛泽东	Sun Yat-sen	
2014	ICAC Investigators 2014	廉政行動2014	Chapman Cheuk	
2015	Cruel Romance	錦繡緣華麗冒險	Xiang Hanchuan	
2015	Cold Winter	寒冬	Yu Dejiang	
2015	The Cage of Love	抓住彩虹的男人	Wu Hongda	
2015	City of Desperate Love	華胥引之絕愛之城		
2016	Face and Mind	整容季	Mr. M	
2016	Stay with Me	放弃我，抓紧我	Huo Ruiqiang	
2017	Jade	女管家	Wang Fugui	
2017	Charlie Soong: The Father	宋耀如·父親	Charlie Soong	
2017	Nothing Gold Can Stay	那年花開月正圓	Shen Sihai	
2018	Secret of the Three Kingdoms	三國機密	Cao Cao	
2018	Sweet Dreams	一千零一夜	Liu Yingjie	
2018	Martial Universe	武动乾坤	Lin Xiao	
2019	Behind The Scenes	幕后之王	Xu Changye	
2019	The Legend of White Snake	新白娘子传奇	Xu Huairen	
2019	Please Give Me a Pair of Wings	请赐我一双翅膀	Leng Shinan	
2019	Alive Dead Spy	计中计	Heye Xingnan	
2019	Stained	心冤	Dickson Kei	aired in early 2019
2019	Prodigy Healer	青囊传	Shangguan Qing	
2019	Your Secret	我知道你的秘密	Bei Chen's father	
2020	Legend of Awakening	天醒之路	Guo Youdao / Guo Wushu	
2020	Reunion: The Sound of the Providence	重启之极海听雷	Boss Jiao	
2020	God of Lost Fantasy	太古神王	Ren Qianxing	
2021	Stray Birds	飞鸟集	Liang Hongda	
2021	My Talent Neighbour	走起！我的天才街坊	Xie Boqian	
2021	Yu Zhao Ling	玉昭令		
2021	Immortality	皓衣行	Xue Zhengyong	
2024	See Her Again	太阳星辰	Yip Sing	

=== Music video appearances ===
Year	Title	Artist	Ref.
2023	"Unconditional Love"	Kelly Chen	
2024	"The Furniture"	Jeffrey Ngai	

== Theater ==
- The Mad Phoenix (Chinese: 南海十三郎)
- I Have a Date with Spring (Chinese: 我和春天有個約會)

== Awards and nominations ==
Year	#	Award	Category	Work	Result
Film
1997	34th	Golden Horse Awards	Best Actor	The Mad Phoenix	Won
1998	17th	Hong Kong Film Awards	Best Actor	The Mad Phoenix	Nominated
2000	19th	Hong Kong Film Awards	Best Supporting Actor	Ordinary Heroes	Nominated
2024	42nd	Hong Kong Film Awards	Best Supporting Actor	A Guilty Conscience	Nominated
Theatre
1993	2nd	Hong Kong Drama Awards	Best Actor (Comedy/Farce)	The Marriage of Figaro	Nominated
1994	3rd	Hong Kong Drama Awards	Best Actor (Tragedy/Drama)	The Mad Phoenix	Nominated
1995	4th	Hong Kong Drama Awards	Best Supporting Actor (Tragedy/Drama)	The Seven Sages	Nominated
1996	5th	Hong Kong Drama Awards	Best Actor (Comedy/Farce)	Red Room, White Room, Black Room	Nominated
2003	12th	Hong Kong Drama Awards	Best Actor (Tragedy/Drama)	Secret of Resurrection	Nominated
2011	2nd	One Drama Awards	Best Actor	The Liaisons	Nominated
