= Xue Xiaolu =

Chinese film director and screenwriter

- Born: 1970 (age 55–56); Beijing
- Education: Beijing Film Academy
- Occupations: Director, Screenwriter

Chinese name
- Traditional Chinese: 薛曉路
- Simplified Chinese: 薛晓路
Transcriptions
Standard Mandarin
- Hanyu Pinyin: Xuē Xiǎolù

Xue Xiaolu is a Chinese film director and screenwriter. She is considered one of the top Chinese female directors. Her first major feature was Ocean Heaven (2010), which stars Jet Li, followed by Finding Mr. Right (2013) starring Tang Wei and Wu Xiubo. Her top-grossing film is Finding Mr. Right 2. Her films have won multiple awards in China and abroad, including the Outstanding New Screen Writer award at the fifteenth HuaBiao Awards (for Ocean Heaven), and Best Director at the 2013 China Image Film Festival (for Finding Mr. Right). Xue is also a teacher at the Beijing Film Academy, and has been a volunteer with Beijing Stars and Rain, a non-governmental educational organization for autistic children, for 14 years.

== Early life and education ==
In 1989, Xue enrolled in the Literature Department of Beijing Film Academy with a major in Film Studies. After receiving her bachelor's degree in 1993, Xue continued her studies in Screen Writing and Theory majors, completing her master's degree in 1996.

== Career ==
After her graduation in 1996, Xue joined CCTV-10 (the science and education channel of the CCTV Network) as a producer. During her producing career, Xue participated in several well-known Chinese TV series and films as a screenwriter. In 2001, Xue produced the script of the high rating TV series Don't Respond to Strangers - Domestic Violence with co-writer Jiang Wei. In 2002, Xue joined the production of the Film Together, directed by the leading figure of fifth generation of Chinese cinema - Chen Kaige; together they created the narrative of this film. In 2005, the film had been nominated "Best Picture" by the Golden Rooster Awards in 2002.

In 2010, Xue introduced her directorial debut with Ocean Heaven. This film follows a story of a simple and unadorned father taking care of his son who is on the autism spectrum. The international Kungfu movie star, Jet Li, plays the diligent father in this film. The film surrounds the rarely discussed subject of the disadvantaged group, therefore attracting significant attention from different areas of Chinese society.

Three years later, Xue wrote and directed her second film Finding Mr. Right, a romantic comedy starring Wu Xiubo and Tang Wei. The film tells of a love story taking place in Seattle between a Chinese immigrated taxi driver and a pregnant women who had recently moved into an illegal maternity center. Though it is a humorous story of romance, it deals with the more serious issues of Anchor babies and affairs in modern society. Upon its release, the film received favorable reviews and grossed approximately US$85 million in China. Due to its great success, Xu instantly became one of the most successful female directors in China.

In 2016, the sequel Finding Mr. Right 2 was released, featuring the same cast but a telling a different love story. This sequel broke the opening day box office record for romantic films in China, acquiring nearly US$15 million on its first day, and achieved nearly US$113 million box office in total. The success Xue's third directing film, Finding Mr. Right 2 lead her to become the female director with the highest-grossing film in 2016.

In 2017, Xue was invited to be a guest reviewer in LACFF (Los Angeles Chinese Film Festival).

== Filmography ==
Year	English title	Chinese title	Role
1995	He Ai Yi Qi Zhang Da	和爱一起长大	Writer
2001	Don't Respond to Strangers - Domestic Violence (TV series)	不要和陌生人说话	Writer
2002	Together	和你在一起	Writer (With Chen Kaige)
2003	Duo Zi	夺子	Writer
2003	Tian Tang Niao (TV series)	天堂鸟	Writer
2005	Autumnal Rain	秋雨	Writer
2010	Ocean Heaven	海洋天堂	Director/Writer
2013	Finding Mr. Right	北京遇上西雅图	Director/Writer
2015	Keep the Marriage as Jade	守婚如玉	Writer
2016	Finding Mr. Right 2	北京遇上西雅图：不二情书	Director/Writer
2019	My People, My Country	我和我的祖国	
2021	Embrace Again	穿过寒冬拥抱你	Director

== Awards ==
- China Image Film Festival: Best Screenwriter - Xue Xiaolu
- China Image Film Festival: Best Director - Xue Xiaolu
