= Tang Wei =

Chinese actress (born 1979)

- 汤唯
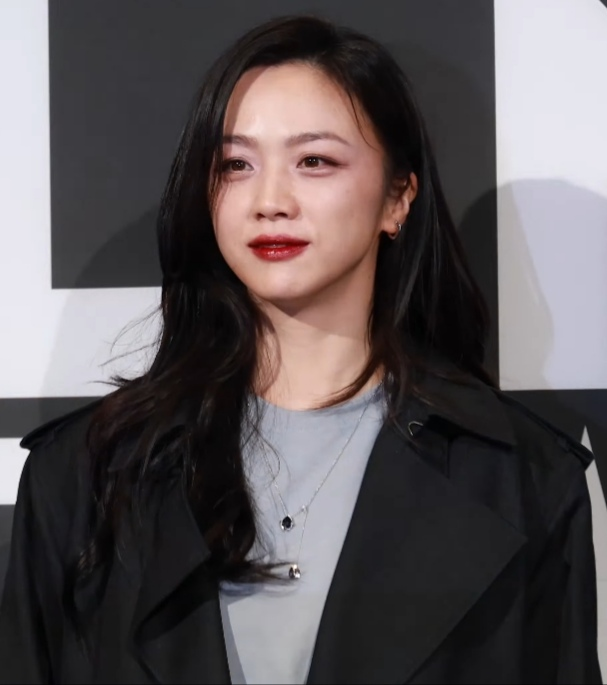
- Tang in 2025
- Born: 7 October 1979 (age 47); Hangzhou, Zhejiang, China
- Other name: Rebecca Tang
- Citizenship: Chinese (Hong Kong)
- Education: Central Academy of Drama
- Occupation: Actress
- Years active: 1998–present
- Agents: Edko Films Ltd. (China); Creative Artists Agency (US)
- Notable work: Lust, Caution; Decision to Leave
- Spouse: Kim Tae-yong (m. 2014)
- Children: 2
- Awards: Full list

Chinese name
- Traditional Chinese: 湯唯
- Simplified Chinese: 汤唯
Transcriptions
Standard Mandarin
- Hanyu Pinyin: Tāng wéi

Tang Wei (simplified Chinese: 汤唯; traditional Chinese: 湯唯; pinyin: Tāng Wéi; Korean: 탕웨이; born 7 October 1979) is a Chinese actress. She rose to international fame for her role in Golden Lion-winning Lust, Caution (2007) by Ang Lee, for which she was banned by the Chinese government due to the explicit sexual nature of her performance, until her comeback in Crossing Hennessy in 2010. She gained further acclaim for her performances in Late Autumn (2010), Finding Mr. Right (2013), The Golden Era (2014), Long Day's Journey into Night (2018), Decision to Leave (2022), and Wonderland (2024).

Tang is the first and only non-Korean to be honored as the Best Actress at the Baeksang Arts Awards (twice), Blue Dragon Film Awards, Chunsa Film Art Awards and Buil Film Awards. She is also the first Asian actor to have won the Trophée Chopard, which she received at the 2008 Cannes Film Festival. Tang ranked 72rd on the Forbes China Celebrity 100 list in 2008, 70th in 2013, 38th in 2014, and 55th in 2015.

== Early life ==
Tang Wei was born on 7 October 1979 in Hangzhou, Zhejiang. She is the only child of Tang Yuming, a painter, and Shi Xifeng, who works as a Yue opera actress. From 1992 to 1994, Tang attended school in Shenzhen, Guangdong due to her father's job. She graduated from a vocational school in Hangzhou, where she studied fine arts, in 1996 and worked as a model afterward.

Initially aspiring to study acting at the Central Academy of Drama, she failed three times before being admitted to the directing program in 2000 on her fourth attempt. At university, she caught the attention of producer Yuan Hong and Taiwanese stage director Stan Lai, leading her to be cast in a production of the latter's play A Dream Like a Dream, a role she held until she was cast for the film Lust, Caution in 2006.

== Career ==
=== 2004–2009: Lust, Caution and ban ===
In 2004, Tang starred in a TV series, Policewoman Swallow (2004), and a stage play, Che Guevara. She also appeared in TV dramas Sons and Daughters of the Red Cross (2004), Leaving Seafront Street (2005), East Meets West (2005), Born in the 60s (2006) and Silent Tears (2006).

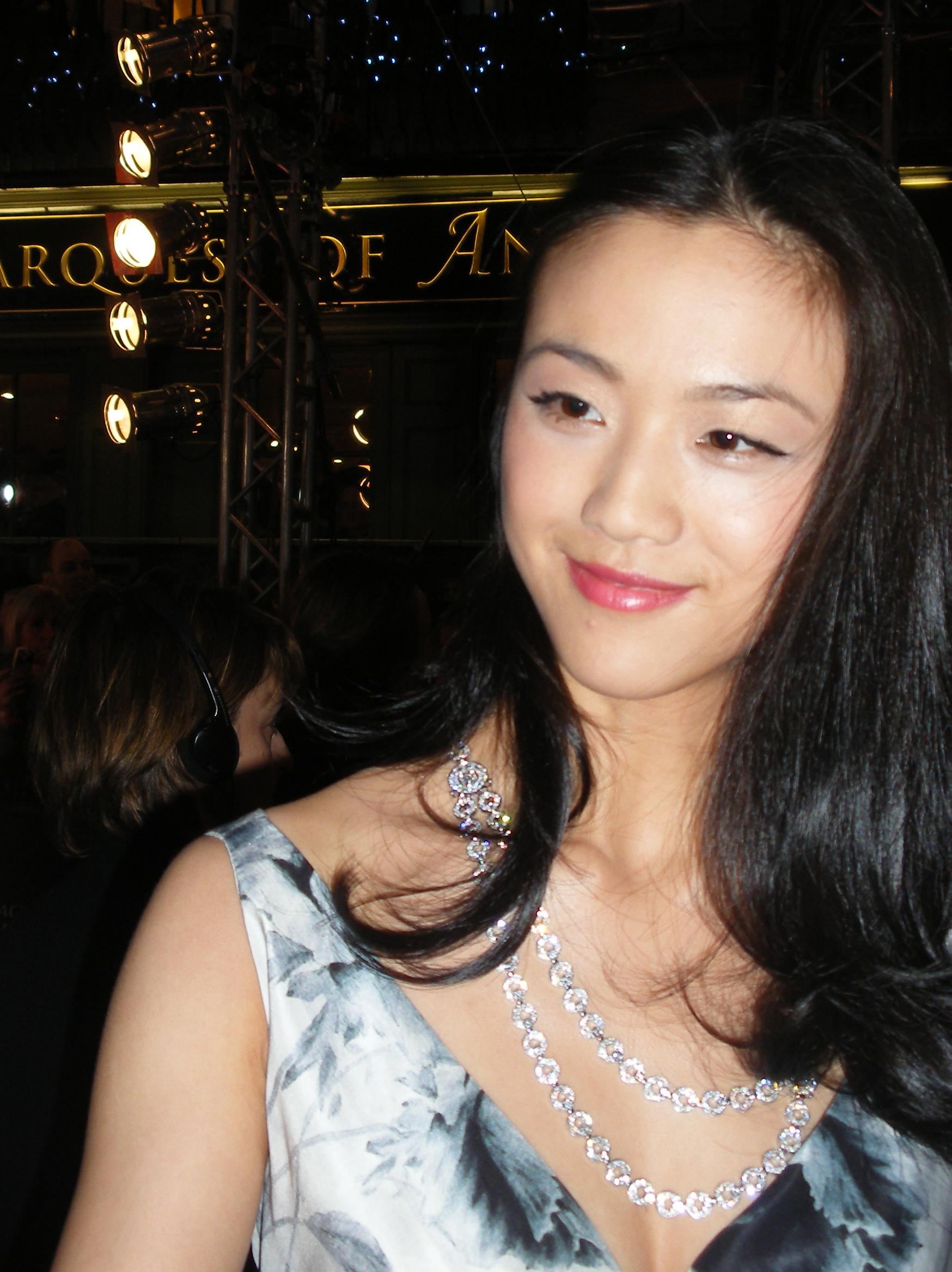
Tang at the 61st British Academy Film Awards in 2008

In July 2006, Tang was cast from more than 10,000 actresses to star in Ang Lee's classic film Lust, Caution (2007), adapted from Eileen Chang's novella inspired by the story of female spy Zheng Pingru. Tang learned Shanghainese and Suzhou Pingtan, which is sung in the Suzhou dialect, for her role. She won the Golden Horse Award for Best New Performer and was nominated for an Independent Spirit Award and a BAFTA Award for the film.

Despite the critical acclaim for her performance, China's State Administration of Radio Film and Television (SARFT) ordered a media ban on Tang because of the sexual nature of her performance. All print ads and feature content using Tang were removed, and her endorsements were discontinued. In August 2008, Tang obtained Hong Kong citizenship through the Quality Migrant Admission Scheme, which was expected to enable her to work in a relatively censorship-free market. She, however, was replaced by Maggie Q in Tian Zhuangzhuang's big-budget period film The Warrior and the Wolf (2009). In February 2009, during her absence from the show business, Tang briefly attended drama classes at the University of Reading in the United Kingdom.

=== 2010–2012: Return to the screen ===
In 2009, Bill Kong, head of Edko Films and executive producer of Lust, Caution, gave Tang a chance to relaunch herself with the Hong Kong romantic comedy Crossing Hennessy (2010), directed by Ivy Ho. For her role, Tang honed her Cantonese, which she had picked up during her school days in Shenzhen, Guangdong. Crossing Hennessy is the first film starring Tang to be shown in China since Lust, Caution, marking the lift of the ban. She was nominated for the Golden Horse Award for Best Leading Actress and Hong Kong Film Award for Best Actress for this film.

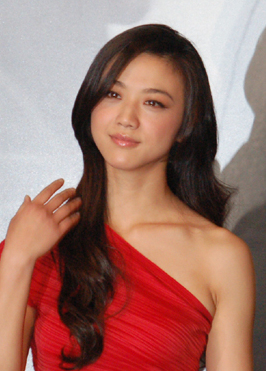
Tang in Seoul in 2011

From November 2009 to March 2010, Tang filmed alongside Hyun Bin in Late Autumn (2010), directed by Kim Tae-yong. The film was shot in Seattle, Washington. Tang's performance won over South Korean audiences and made her the only non-Korean to win the Baeksang Awards for Best Actress.

In September 2010, it was announced that she was to appear in the CCP tribute film The Founding of a Party, playing the role of Tao Yi, an early girlfriend of Mao Zedong. However, her scenes were cut out in the theatrical version, allegedly at the request of Mao Zedong's grandson, Mao Xinyu. In December 2011, she dubbed the character of Pia Sahastrabuddhe, originally portrayed by Kareena Kapoor, in the Chinese version of the Bollywood film 3 Idiots (2009).

Tang returned to mainstream cinema with two major films; Speed Angels, a car-racing flick directed by Jingle Ma, and Dragon, a martial arts epic directed by Peter Chan. Though Speed Angels was a commercial flop, Dragon was successful and was named the eighth best movie of 2012 according to Time magazine.

=== 2013–present: Career resurgence and critical success ===
In 2013, Tang starred opposite actor Wu Xiubo in the Xue Xiaolu-directed romantic comedy Finding Mr. Right. The sleeper hit grossed $85 million at the box office in China and Tang received rave reviews for her performance. She won Best Actress at 21st Beijing College Student Film Festival. Tang was then cast to play writer Xiao Hong in Ann Hui's biopic The Golden Era, which closed at the Venice International Film Festival. Though highly anticipated, the film received mixed reviews and failed at the box office. However, her performance has received high praise from domestic critics.

Tang made her English-language film debut in Blackhat, an action thriller co-starring Chris Hemsworth and Wang Leehom, her co-star in Lust, Caution (2007). She also starred in A Tale of Three Cities, based on the wartime experiences of Jackie Chan's parents. During the shooting of The Tale of Three Cities in Shanghai, Tang fell victim to a telecommunications scam and was swindled out of $34,692 (210,000 yuan). Tang and Wu teamed up again to film the sequel to Finding Mr. Right (2013), titled Book of Love (2016), which was a commercial success. With this film, she was nominated as the Best Actress in Hong Kong Film Awards for the sixth time, setting a record for nominations, but did not win the award in history.

In 2017, Tang was cast as the female lead of Long Day's Journey Into Night, directed by Bi Gan. The film was screened in the Un Certain Regard section at the 2018 Cannes Film Festival. In 2019, Tang returned to the small screen with the historical drama Empress of the Ming. The same year, she starred in the film The Whistleblower directed by Xue Xiaolu.

In 2022, Tang starred in the South Korean mystery-romance film Decision to Leave, directed by Park Chan-Wook, to critical acclaim. In April 2022, the film was selected to compete for the Palme d'Or at the 2022 Cannes Film Festival, where Park Chan-wook won Best Director. For her role as a Chinese immigrant to South Korea who is suspected of murder, Tang became the first non-Korean honored as the Best Actress at the Baeksang Art Awards, which was for the second time, Blue Dragon Film Awards, Chunsa Film Art Awards and Buil Film Awards.

== Endorsements ==
In 2011, Tang became brand ambassador for Japanese cosmetics brand SK-II. Since 2015, she has been the global brand ambassador of SK-II. In August 2021, Tang became the global face of the SK-II's "My PITERA™ Story" skincare campaign, along with Ni Ni, Haruka Ayase, and Chloë Grace Moretz. In 2013, Tang became the global face of Piaget's rose jewelry collection campaign. Since 2014, she has been selected as global spokesperson for Swiss luxury watch brand Rado. Since 2021, British makeup and skincare brand Charlotte Tilbury has chosen Tang as its very first global makeup ambassador. In 2022, she was also become the first global brand ambassador for watches and jewelry brand Lola Rose.

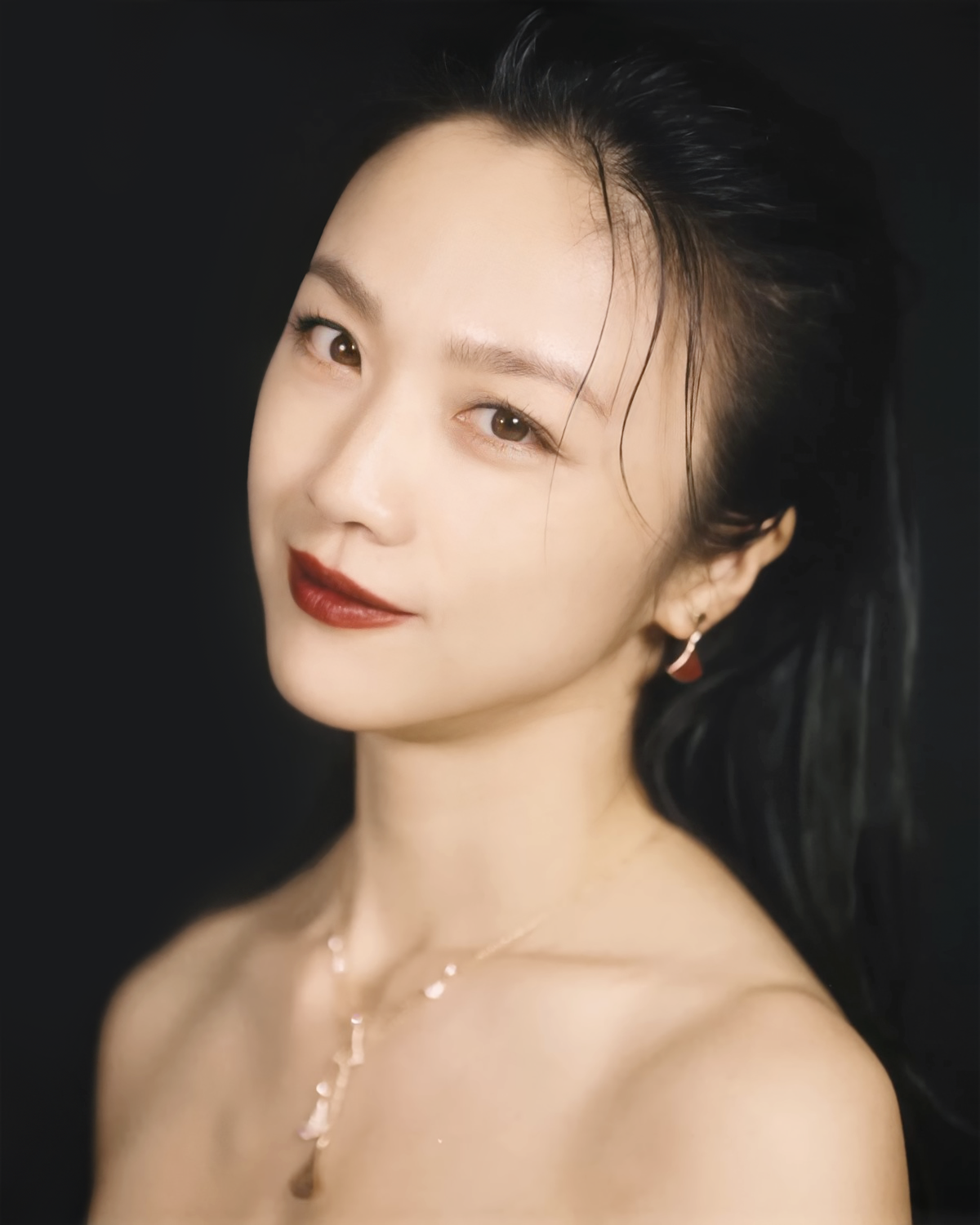
Tang for a Marie Claire Korea photoshoot in 2022

Since 2022, Tang has served as a global brand ambassador for Spanish luxury fashion house Loewe. She was the global face that July for Loewe's pre-fall 2022 collection campaign along with Anthony Hopkins, Jessie Buckley, Josh O'Connor, Kaia Gerber and more. In November of that year, Tang was named as the global face of the Loewe's spring/summer 2023 collection campaign along with Taylor Russell, Luca Guadagnino, Naomi Ackie, Chloë Sevigny and more. In January 2023, she became the global face of the Loewe's Year of Rabbit Collection campaign. In August 2023, Tang starred as the global face of the Loewe's Womenswear Fall-Winter 2023 campaign along with Taylor Russell that shot by British fashion photographer David Sims.

In May 2023, Chopard, a Swiss brand for luxury watches, jewelry and accessories, announced Tang as its brand ambassador following her attendance at the 76th Cannes Film Festival. Since September 2023, Chopard had announced Tang as its global brand ambassador. In November 2023, Tang has served as a global brand ambassador for British luxury fashion house Burberry.

== Personal life ==
Tang dated actor Zhu Yuchen between 1997 and 2000 after they met in 1995 as classmates at a vocational school in Hangzhou.

Her second romance was actor Tian Yu. The two met in 2004 while working on Policewoman Swallow (2004) and were in a relationship for three years.

She began a relationship with Chen Yuli, the son of composer Chen Qigang until he was killed in a car accident on 4 September 2012 in Zurich.

Her fourth boyfriend was Hu Jing (Victor Hu), a former talent show contestant and publicist. Hu was a friend of Chen Yuli and organized his memorial service, where he and Tang first met.

In 2014, Tang married South Korean film director Kim Tae-yong in the front yard of the home of Ingmar Bergman on the remote Swedish island of Fårö. A formal wedding ceremony was later held in Hong Kong, with only immediate family members as guests. In August 2016, Tang gave birth to their daughter, Summer. In July 2026, she gave birth to their second child, a son.

== Filmography ==
=== Film ===
Year	Title	Role	Notes	Ref.
2007	Lust, Caution	Wong Chia Chi		
2010	Crossing Hennessy	Oi-lin		
2010	Late Autumn	Anna		
2011	Dragon	Ayu		
2011	Speed Angels	Hong Xiaoyi		
2011	The Founding of a Party	Tao Yi	Scenes removed	
2011	3 Idiots	Pia Sahastrabuddh (voice)	Mandarin dub	
2013	Finding Mr. Right	Jia Jia		
2014	The Golden Era	Xiao Hong		
2015	Blackhat	Chen Lien	English-language debut	
2015	Monster Hunt	Dealer	Special appearance	
2015	Only You	Fang Yuan		
2015	A Tale of Three Cities	Chen Yuerong		
2015	Office	Sophie		
2016	Finding Mr. Right 2	Jiao Ye		
2018	Long Day's Journey into Night	Wan Qiwen		
2019	Push and Shove	Mrs. Chai	Cameo	
2019	The Whistleblower	Zhou Siliang		
2022	Decision to Leave	Seo-rae		
2024	Wonderland	Bai Li		

=== Television ===
Year	Title	Role	Notes
1998	Chinese Female Football	Goalkeeper	Cameo
2004	Policewoman Swallow	Swallow	Debut
2004	Sons and Daughters of the Red Cross	Ning Xiaoya	
2005	Brother, Brother	Secretary	
2005	Leaving Seafront Street	Yan Lei	
2005	Qingqian Nalati	Chen Yan	
2006	Born in the 60s	Yue Linlin	
2006	Silent Tears	Shang Li	
2019	Ming Dynasty	Sun Ruowei	

=== Theater ===
Year	Title	Role
2001	A Dream Like a Dream	Lai Shengchuan
2004	Che Guevara	Yang Ting

=== Music video appearances ===
Year	Title	Artist	Ref.
2024	"Shh.."	IU (featuring Hyein and Wonsun Joe; narration by Patti Kim)	

== Accolades ==
=== Awards and nominations ===
Year	Award	Category	Work	Result	Ref.
2007	Alliance of Women Film Journalists	Best Newcomer	Lust, Caution	Nominated	
2007	Alliance of Women Film Journalists	Best Depiction of Nudity or Sexuality	Lust, Caution	Nominated	
2007	20th Chicago Film Critics Association Awards	Most Promising Performer	Lust, Caution	Nominated	
2007	44th Golden Horse Awards	Best Leading Actress	Lust, Caution	Nominated	
2007	44th Golden Horse Awards	Best New Performer	Lust, Caution	Won	
2008	2nd Asian Film Awards	Best Actress	Lust, Caution	Nominated	
2008	61st British Academy Film Awards	Rising Star Award	—N/a	Nominated	
2008	61st Cannes Film Festival	Trophée Chopard	—N/a	Won	
2008	8th Chinese Film Media Awards	Best Actress	Lust, Caution	Nominated	
2008	8th Chinese Film Media Awards	Best Newcomer	Lust, Caution	Won	
2008	23rd Independent Spirit Awards	Best Female Lead	Lust, Caution	Nominated	
2010	47th Golden Horse Awards	Best Leading Actress	Crossing Hennessy	Nominated	
2011	11th Chinese Film Media Awards	Best Actress	Crossing Hennessy	Won	
2011	30th Hong Kong Film Awards	Best Actress	Crossing Hennessy	Nominated	
2011	17th Hong Kong Film Critics Society Awards	Best Actress	Crossing Hennessy	Runner-up	
2011	32nd Blue Dragon Film Awards	Best Actress	Late Autumn	Nominated	
2011	47th Baeksang Arts Awards	Best Actress – Film	Late Autumn	Won	
2011	47th Baeksang Arts Awards	Most Popular Actress	Late Autumn	Nominated	
2011	12th Busan Film Critics Awards	Best Actress	Late Autumn	Won	
2011	20th Buil Film Awards	Best Actress	Late Autumn	Nominated	
2011	31st Korean Association of Film Critics Awards	Best Actress	Late Autumn	Won	
2011	Cine21 Awards	Actress of the Year	Late Autumn	Won	
2012	9th Huading Awards	Best Actress	Late Autumn	Nominated	
2012	31st Hong Kong Film Awards	Best Actress	Dragon	Nominated	
2013	10th Huading Awards	Best Actress	Finding Mr. Right	Nominated	
2013	22nd Shanghai Film Critics Awards	Best Actress	Finding Mr. Right	Won	
2014	21st Beijing College Student Film Festival	Best Actress	Finding Mr. Right	Won	
2014	5th China Film Director's Guild Awards	Best Actress	Finding Mr. Right	Won	
2014	32nd Hundred Flowers Awards	Best Actress	Finding Mr. Right	Nominated	
2014	33rd Hong Kong Film Awards	Best Actress	Finding Mr. Right	Nominated	
2014	8th Asia Pacific Screen Awards	Best Performance by an Actress	The Golden Era	Nominated	
2015	22nd Beijing College Student Film Festival	Best Actress	The Golden Era	Nominated	
2015	30th Golden Rooster Awards	Best Actress	The Golden Era	Nominated	
2015	51st Golden Horse Awards	Best Leading Actress	The Golden Era	Nominated	
2015	10th Hong Kong Film Directors' Guild Awards	Best Actress	The Golden Era	Won	
2015	9th Asian Film Awards	Best Actress	The Golden Era	Nominated	
2015	34th Hong Kong Film Awards	Best Actress	The Golden Era	Nominated	
2016	35th Hong Kong Film Awards	Best Actress	A Tale of Three Cities	Nominated	
2017	36th Hong Kong Film Awards	Best Actress	Book of Love	Nominated	
2022	27th Chunsa Film Art Awards	Best Actress	Decision to Leave	Won	
2022	31st Buil Film Awards	Best Actress	Decision to Leave	Won	
2022	58th Grand Bell Awards	Best Actress	Decision to Leave	Nominated	
2022	42nd Korean Association of Film Critics Awards	Best Actress	Decision to Leave	Won	
2022	43rd Blue Dragon Film Awards	Best Actress	Decision to Leave	Won	
2022	3rd Sunset Circle Awards	Best Actress	Decision to Leave	Nominated	
2022	27th Florida Film Critics Circle Awards	Best Actress	Decision to Leave	Runner-up	
2022	Cine21 Awards	Actress of the Year	Decision to Leave	Won	
2022	7th New Mexico Critics Awards	Best Supporting Actress	Decision to Leave	Won	
2022	42nd Golden Cinematography Awards	Best Actress	Decision to Leave	Won	
2022	17th Dublin Film Critics' Circle Awards	Best Actress	Decision to Leave	Nominated	
2022	Kinolights Awards	Actress of The Year (Foreign)	Decision to Leave	1st	
2022	12th Georgia Film Critics Association Awards	Best Actress	Decision to Leave	Nominated	
2023	20th International Cinephile Society Awards	Best Actress	Decision to Leave	Nominated	
2023	16th Asian Film Awards	Best Actress	Decision to Leave	Won	
2023	21st Director's Cut Awards	Best Actress in film	Decision to Leave	Won	
2023	59th Baeksang Arts Awards	Best Actress – Film	Decision to Leave	Won	
2024	45th Blue Dragon Film Awards	Best Actress	Wonderland	Nominated	
2024	45th Blue Dragon Film Awards	Popular Star Award	Wonderland	Won	
2025	18th Asian Film Awards	Excellence in Asian Cinema Award	—N/a	Honored	

=== Other honors ===
- 2004 - Miss Universe China finalist
- 2007 - New York Times listed her as one of the Best 15 Performers in 2007
- 2007 - Variety's top 10 actors to watch
- 2022 - New York cinema's Metrograph honors her with "Starring Tang Wei" throughout November
