= Silent Tears =

Chinese television series

- 女人不哭; Nǚrén bù kū
- Genre: Drama
- Screenplay by: Shen Jie; Zhang Lu
- Directed by: Lin Jianlong
- Starring: Tang Wei; Tian Hairong; Deng Chao; Yao Qianyu; Jia Nailiang
- Country of origin: China
- Original language: Mandarin
- No. of episodes: 34

Original release
- Release: 6 November 2006

Related
- Beautiful Life

Silent Tears (Chinese:女人不哭) is a 2006 TV drama series directed by Lin Jianlong, and starring Tang Wei, Tian Hairong, Deng Chao, Yao Qianyu, and Jia Nailiang. The series was written by screen-writing duo Zhang Lu and Shen Jie. Positive public reception led to three subsequent series in the same fictional universe.

== Plot ==
The story covers the life of Zhang Zijun from age fourteen to forty.

Zhang Zijun's parents died in an earthquake, leaving her responsible for her brother and sister, Zihua and Ziyue, at the age of fourteen. The three children go to live with their aunt and uncle, but the aunt sells Zijun into marriage. Zijun eventually escapes and lives on the streets where she meets Xiao Hua, whom she takes as her little brother, and the criminal Ma Dashun.

When Zijun returns to the city where her aunt and uncle live, she survives living on the streets and encounters the father of her friend Zhao Jian. Events unfold so that she is an accomplice in Ma Dashun's plot to rob the Zhao family, which results in the father's death. Despite aiding the police in capturing Ma Dashun, Zijun is sentenced to three years in prison.

On being released from prison, Zijun meets Lao Shen Yi, an elderly man who proposes to marry her so that she can adopt his bastard son, Hai Tian. Zijun accepts, and upon Lao Shen Yi's death, she inherits a restaurant. Ma Xiaoshun, poisons the food in revenge for Zijun's role in his brother's arrest which leads to multiple deaths and the business being closed. While this is happening, Zihua has been involved with Shang Li, a delinquent, and ends up arrested. Zijun leaves, traveling south on her own to start over.

Eventually, Zijun and Zihua meet again. He is sued for fraud, and while Zijun is trying to fix things for Zihua, he drops out of school. Zijun is also being romantically pursued by Cheng Hao and they plan to marry, but the wedding is cancelled.

In the end, Zijun marries Zhao Jian and is a successful businesswoman.

== Cast ==
- Deng Chao as Zhao Jian
- Jia Nailiang as Zhang Zihua
- Tang Wei as Shang Li
- Tian Hairong as Zhang Zijun
- Yao Qianyu as A-Mei

== Production ==
Shen Jie and Zhang Lu wrote the scripts for the series. Lin Jianlong served as director.

Filming took place at the Beijing Film Studio beginning 8 March 2006. Guangzhou Oriental Pearl Cultural Communication Co., Ltd. financed the series' production.

== Release ==
Silent Tears premiered on the Shanghai Oriental Movie Channel on 6 November 2006.

Following Tang Wei's appearance in Ang Lee's Lust, Caution, television distributors outside of China became interested in securing rights for Silent Tears.

The series premiered on Tianjin Satellite TV on 30 December 2007.

Following the 2008 Sichuan earthquake, Asia Television aired the series in the hope of inspiring child survivors who were orphaned in the disaster.

== Reception ==
As a result of the show's popularity, several subsequent series were produced, with Zhang and Shen co-writing. These included the 2007 series Xuě zài shāo (Snow on Fire), 2008's Xiàozhe huó xiàqù (Beautiful Life), and the 2009 series Wǒ shì yī kē xiǎo cǎo.

Tang Wei was unable to appear in Beautiful Life due to her commitment to Lust, Caution.
