= Ocean Heaven =

2010 Chinese-Hong Kong film by Xue Xiaolu

- Hong Kong theatrical poster
- Directed by: Xue Xiaolu
- Written by: Xue Xiaolu
- Produced by: William Kong; Hao Lee; Ma Hefeng
- Starring: Jet Li; Wen Zhang; Gwei Lun-mei
- Cinematography: Christopher Doyle
- Edited by: Chang Suk Ping; Yang Hongyu
- Music by: Joe Hisaishi
- Production companies: Edko Films Limited; BDI Films Inc.; Beijing H&H Communication Medium Limited; Nice Select Ltd.
- Distributed by: Edko Films Limited
- Release dates: 18 June 2010 (China); 24 June 2010 (Hong Kong); 9 July 2011 (Japan)
- Running time: 96 minutes
- Countries: China; Hong Kong
- Languages: Mandarin; Cantonese
- Budget: 14 million yuan

Ocean Heaven (Chinese: 海洋天堂; pinyin: Hǎiyáng Tiāntáng; Jyutping: hoi^{2} joeng^{4} tin^{1} tong^{4}) is a 2010 drama film starring martial arts superstar Jet Li in his first full drama role playing against type. It also co-stars Taiwanese actress Gwei Lun-mei, who previously starred in Jay Chou's Secret. A Chinese-Hong Kong co-production, the movie was filmed in Qingdao at the Qingdao Polar Ocean World and received promotion from the Qingdao council.

It was announced that it was to be released in spring 2010, but the release date was pushed back to 24 June 2010, which opened the 2010 Shanghai International Film Festival on 2 June. Jet Li wants this film to get a good message across and promote the works with autism as well as the works of his charity 'The One Foundation'.

Xue Xiaolu, a teacher at the Beijing Film Academy, wrote and directed the 7 million yuan (US$1 million) movie. The first-time director has been a volunteer for 14 years with Beijing Stars and Rain, a non-governmental educational organization for children with autism. The story was mostly based on her personal real life and experience. She said, "With the addition of actors like Gwei Lun-Mei and Wen Zhang, I am even more confident in the film production."

At first nobody was willing to take a risk on such a non-commercial script until film mogul Bill Kong, the man behind Hero and Crouching Tiger, Hidden Dragon stepped in. It saw the inclusion of award winning cinematographer Christopher Doyle (Hero, 2046, In the Mood for Love), composer Joe Hisaishi (Spirited Away, Departures, Hana-bi) and production designer Yee Chung-Man (Anna Magdalena, Curse of the Golden Flower).

== Plot ==
Ocean Heaven is about a terminally ill father, Sam Wong/Wang Xincheng (Jet Li) as he works his job in an aquarium and struggles to look after his 21-year-old son with autism, Dafu/David (Wen Zhang). Sam has single-handedly brought up his son since his wife died in a swimming accident 14 years ago and looks after him day and night. Upon discovering Sam has less than five months to live, he multiplies his efforts to help Dafu learn basic tasks in order to care for himself, as well as searching for a home for him, before he passes away. As the story progresses, the growing relationship between father and son, as well as the community around them, become clearer. Ling ling (Gwei Lun-mei) plays the role of a clown who is part of a small traveling circus (they perform in the aquarium for a short period of time) and who gets on well with Dafu, leading to a close friendship between them.

Though Dafu struggles to learn many basic tasks, Sam perseveres in teaching his son the tasks that he will need to know how to perform himself once his father dies. Though Sam never gave up teaching and explaining things to Dafu in a positive and supportive and memorable manner, he did contemplate ending his and Dafu's existence together rather than leave his child to suffer without him. Sam, at this point had yet to tell anyone how far his health had deteriorated, until one day while returning from their hometown, his neighbor tells Sam his doctor came from the city with bags of free medicine and waited two hours for him. Meanwhile, Principal Liu, of the boarding school for mentally challenged children that Dafu attended as a child, recommends Dafu to a newly opened institution where he can stay after his father dies.

Dafu continues learning, though Sam must move into the institution with him to help him adjust. Ling Ling, knowing that she is about to have to leave with her circus, teaches Dafu to pick up the phone in the aquarium when he hears it, and she will talk to him.

Ling Ling leaves with her circus. Sam, for the first time in the movie, swims in the aquarium with his son, dressed in a sea turtle costume he made by hand, telling his son not to be afraid when he is gone; he will be like the turtles in the aquarium, always swimming close by with him. He almost drowns but is helped from water by Mr. Tang and while they chat, Sam reveals his wife's death might not have been an accident as she was a very good swimmer and they had recently found out Dafu is autistic. Sam doesn't blame her for not being able to handle their son's circumstances. There was only one instance in which Sam loses his composure with Dafu, while he is nearing the end, and still working and trying to teach his son how to do his job, Dafu is distracted and Sam yells at him. Less than a moment later and Sam is already mending fences and reassuring his son.

Sam eventually dies, and his funeral is attended by close friends and family. Dafu waves good bye to the sky/Sam, as it seems he has learned people live there, something Ling Ling explained to him earlier when she spoke of her grandmother with him before she left town. After the funeral, Dafu is seen doing some of the things that his father struggled so much to teach him with success. He cooks by himself, knows how to ride the bus, and picks up the phone when Ling Ling calls, and working at the ocean park, a place Mr. has opened the doors for Dafu at any time of the day. It is implied that from then on, Dafu will know how to lead his life on his own, though he still has Sam's old friends helping him along the way.

== Cast ==
- Jet Li as Sam Wong / Wang Xincheng
- Wen Zhang as David / Dafu
- Gwei Lun-mei as Ling
- Zhu Yuanyuan as Madam Chai
- Dong Yong as Director Tang
- Gao Yuanyuan as Sam Wong's deceased wife/Dafu's mother
- Yong Mei as Principal Tan
- Yan Minqiu as Principal Liu
- Chen Rui as Xia Ya
- Ashton Chen
- Cao Bingkun
- Ma Zihan

== Promotion and work ==
=== Jet Li ===
Jet Li promoted the film by visiting the dolphins at Hong Kong's Ocean Park with a small group of adults who were intellectually challenged or had autism.

Jet Li also was quoted saying "Nowadays everyone is making blockbusters. Making a seven million Chinese yuan (1 million US dollars) movie requires a lot of sincerity", Li told reporters in Hong Kong. "This movie is about sincerity. It shows that in this day and age that filmmakers are willing to do something for society." The father's selfless love for his son touched Li, a father of four children himself: "I cried a lot when reading the script."

"I hope everyone can examine what is the most important relationship in life – the relationship between parent and child", he said. "I met some autistic children last year when I was doing charity work. When I read the script, I cried. I hope to express gratitude to all the parents in the world through the film."

Jet Li did not take any pay for the film.

Jet Li hoped the movie will encourage people pay more attention and dedicate their compassion to charity. TIME magazine named Jet Li one of its Most Influential People this year for his work with his One Foundation. Li revealed that four or five years ago, his nephew had been diagnosed with autism. His nephew is now better, but this incident made him realize how important it is to offer attention and care to those who have been diagnosed and their families.

Li admitted that it was not easy to interpret his character. Because Jet Li's father died when he was two years old, he didn't understand the concept of the word "father" for a long time. When he was filming The Shaolin Temple, there was a line where he had to yell bà ba (dad), which he found himself unable to say: "In the end, the director changed it to diē (another word for dad). I thought diē had nothing to do with me, so I could say it. It wasn't until I became a father that I clearly understood what this role of a father meant." Another difficulty is that Li can't swim, but he eventually swam as the story required.

=== Wen Zhang ===
In order to portray this character well, Wen Zhang (playing Dafu) went swimming every day. He previously did not know how to swim, but because swimming and diving are his character's strong points, he became an expert swimmer. He also visited an autism school every day, working to understand the students' way of thinking.

== Accolades ==
China Movie Channel Media Awards 2010

- Won Best Film: Ocean Heaven
- Won Best New Director: XUE Xiaolu
- Won Best Actor: Wen Zhang
- Nominated for Golden Goblet award

== Theme songs ==
- "Said Goodbye" (說了再見) by Jay Chou
- "Ocean Heaven" (海洋天堂) by Gwei Lun-mei
- Gui Lunmei "Ocean Heaven" composed by Joe Hisaishi

== Reception ==
Ocean Heaven has had particularly good reviews, getting very high ratings. The film also received a 4/5 from The China Post site with a detailed and heart-felt review.

Maggie Lee of The Hollywood Reporter compared the film to Together, and called Ocean Heaven "Empty".

The film was also reviewed by Peter Galvin of SBS Australia, who viewed it at Sydney Chinese Film Festival. In his closing comments, Galvin said that "[it] is not quite a realist film; its world is too kind, its cast too tolerant".
