= Lust, Caution =

2007 film by Ang Lee

- Theatrical release poster
- 色，戒 (Sè, Jiè)
- Directed by: Ang Lee
- Screenplay by: Wang Hui-ling; James Schamus
- Based on: Lust, Caution by Eileen Chang
- Produced by: Ang Lee; William Kong; James Schamus
- Starring: Tony Leung Chiu-wai; Tang Wei; Joan Chen; Wang Leehom
- Cinematography: Rodrigo Prieto
- Edited by: Tim Squyres
- Music by: Alexandre Desplat
- Production companies: River Road Entertainment; Haishang Films; Sil-Metropole Organisation; Shanghai Film Group
- Distributed by: Focus Features (United States); China Film Group Corporation (China); Edko Films (Hong Kong); Buena Vista International (Taiwan)
- Release dates: August 30, 2007 (Venice); September 24, 2007 (Taiwan); September 26, 2007 (Hong Kong); September 28, 2007 (United States); November 1, 2007 (China)
- Running time: 158 minutes
- Countries: United States; China; Taiwan; Hong Kong
- Language: Mandarin
- Budget: $15 million
- Box office: $67.1 million

Lust, Caution (Chinese: 色，戒; pinyin: Sè, Jiè; Jyutping: Sik^{1}Gaai^{3}) is a 2007 erotic spy film directed by Ang Lee, based on the 1979 novella by Eileen Chang. The story is set during World War II, when a group of Chinese students plot to assassinate a high-ranking official in the puppet government of Japanese-occupied Shanghai by luring him into a honey trap.

The film won Lee a second Golden Lion at the Venice Film Festival after Brokeback Mountain. It propelled Tang Wei to stardom but also drew controversy for its explicit sex scenes, which resulted in a two-year ban imposed on her by the Chinese government. The film grossed $67 million worldwide over a $16 million budget, making it the highest grossing NC-17 film of all time.

== Plot ==
=== Hong Kong, 1938 ===
During the Second Sino-Japanese War, a shy and inexperienced university student, Wong Chia Chi, travels from Shanghai to Hong Kong to begin studying at Lingnan University. Male student Kuang Yumin invites her to join his patriotic drama club and she soon becomes a lead actress, inspiring both her audience and her colleagues. Inspired by the club's patriotic plays, Kuang persuades the group to make a more concrete contribution to the war against Japan. He devises a plan to assassinate Mr. Yee, a special agent of the puppet government of Wang Jingwei set up by the Japanese occupation in China. The beautiful Wong is chosen to take on the undercover role of "Mrs. Mak", the elegant wife of a trading company owner. She inserts herself into the social circle of Mrs. Yee.

Wong is still a virgin, and she reluctantly consents to having sex with another student involved in the plot in order to practice her role as a married woman. Attracted to Wong, Yee nearly falls for the trap but backs out at the last minute. Soon after, Mr. and Mrs. Yee move back to Shanghai, leaving the students with no further chance to complete their mission. While they are preparing to disband, a former subordinate of Yee turns up unannounced and tells them that he is aware of their plans. After a violent struggle, the students kill the subordinate and then go into hiding.

=== Shanghai, 1942 ===
Three years later, in Japanese-occupied Shanghai governed by the Wang Jingwei regime, Wong again encounters Kuang, who is now an undercover agent of the Kuomintang (KMT) secret service, the Juntong, which is seeking to overthrow the Japanese occupation forces and the puppet government. Kuang enlists her into a renewed assassination plan to kill Yee, who has become head of Wang Jingwei's secret police department, and is responsible for torturing and executing resistance members. Wong's advances to Yee are reciprocated. During their first sexual encounter, Yee violently rapes Wong. Over the next few weeks, their sexual relationship becomes more consensual and affectionate.

When Wong reports to her KMT superior officer, she exhorts him to carry out the assassination soon, so that she will not have to continue her sexual liaison with Yee, but she is told that the assassination needs to be delayed for strategic reasons. Wong describes the emotional conflict she finds herself embroiled in, sentimentally bound to a man whom she is plotting to help assassinate. When Yee sends Wong to a jewelry store with a sealed envelope, she discovers that he has arranged for a large and extremely rare six-carat pink diamond for her, to be mounted in a ring. This provides the Chinese resistance with a chance to get at Yee when he is not accompanied by his bodyguards.

Soon after, Wong invites Yee to accompany her to collect the diamond ring. While entering the jewelry store, she notices that all those involved in the assassination plot are undercover outside. When she puts on the ring, she is overcome by emotion and quietly urges Yee to leave. Understanding her meaning, he immediately flees the shop and escapes the assassination attempt. By the end of the day, most members of the resistance group have been captured. Yee's deputy reports to him that they had been surveilling the cell for some time. An infuriated Yee demands to know why he was not informed, to which the deputy reluctantly cites Yee's relationship with Wong, before giving him the diamond ring they had recovered. Yee signs the resistance members' death warrants. Wong, Kuang and others are taken to a quarry to be executed. When Yee returns home that night, he sits on Wong's empty bed in the family guest room while his wife comes to ask him what is going on, since his secretary and two men took Wong's belongings and some papers from his office. Yee tells her that if anyone asks, she should say that Mrs. Mak has returned to Hong Kong, and then tells her to continue playing mahjong downstairs. He sits alone in the dark for a while before leaving the room.

== Cast ==
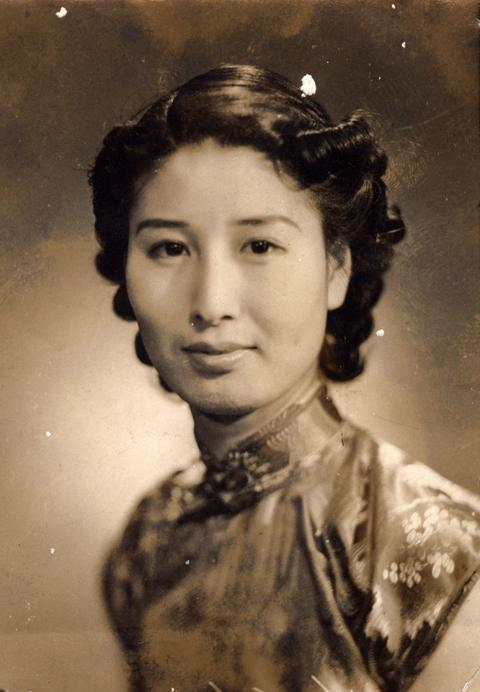
Chinese spy Zheng Pingru is generally believed to have been the inspiration for the story

- Tony Leung Chiu-wai as Mr. Yee
- Tang Wei as Wong Chia Chi/"Mrs. Mak"
- Joan Chen as Mrs. Yee
- Wang Leehom as Kuang Yumin
- Tou Chung-hua as Old Wu
- Chin Kar-lok as Assistant Officer Tsao
- Chu Chih-ying as Lai Xiujin
- Kao Ying-hsuan as Huang Lei
- Lawrence Ko as Liang Junsheng
- Johnson Yuen as Auyang Lingwen/"Mr. Mak"
- Fan Kuang-yao as Secretary Chang
- Anupam Kher as Hali Salahuddin
- Shyam Pathak as Jewelry Shopkeeper
- Akiko Takeshita as Japanese Tavern Boss Lady
- Hayato Fujiki as Japanese Colonel Sato

== Production ==
The actors who played university classmates spent six months of preproduction in Hong Kong to get into character and understand the period before filming. During this period the group of actors, including Tang Wei and Wang Leehom, became very close friends.

== Themes ==
=== Background ===
The original novella by Eileen Chang was sometimes credited to be inspired by the historical event of Zheng Pingru's failed attempt to assassinate the Japanese collaborator Ding Mocun.

=== Meaning of the title ===
The title of the work, Lust, Caution, has a double meaning in Chinese. The character for "lust" (色, sè) can be read as "colour", while "caution" (戒, jiè) can be read as "ring", therefore the title can also read as "colored ring", an object that plays a pivotal role in the story. The two alternate readings of the title are interwoven into a cautionary tale of lust and love through the symbolic use of the ring.

=== Sexuality and power ===
In the movie, Wong's virginity is used as a symbol of both her status as an innocent woman and a barrier to the role she must play in order to prove her patriotism. Wong's virginity is ultimately given as a sacrifice but consequently, her sexuality that has been awakened is used as a weapon against Mr. Yee in order to ensnare him into a relationship.

The portrayal of female sexuality and desire in the film emphasizes the shame and awkwardness of Wong's sexuality versus the role she must play as "Mrs. Mak", which serves the nation rather than her needs as a woman. Sex and sexuality are used as tangible tools in proving patriotism in this film, and in each instance of Wong's bodily sacrifice, she is representing the recognizable symbol of violation experienced by China as a nation while under Japanese occupation.

Through each of the sex scenes, a tangible but subtle difference can be seen in Wong Chia Chi's character as she becomes more comfortable with her sexual desires; a gradual acceptance of pleasure along with a growing role of dominance in hers and Mr. Yee's relationship as compared to the submissive and easily manipulated role she fills in the group of comrades that she is plotting against the Japanese and their collaborators with.

Eileen Chang's original work from which Ang is drawing from does not contain the sex scenes of the film, yet with their addition a change can be seen in the levels of participation and assertiveness from Wong Chia Chi and her own agency in them: the first sex scene focuses on the forced and unpleasant intercourse between the couple; stronger levels of consent and enjoyment from Wong is found in the second sex scene; finally, Wong Chia Chi has recognized her full agency in the third sex scene and is acting with assertion by taking control of her own desires and pleasure with Mr. Yee.

== Soundtrack ==
The music for Lust, Caution was created by French composer Alexandre Desplat. The soundtrack, which was released by Decca Records, contains 24 songs running at approximately 60 minutes in length.

=== Tracklist ===
| 1 | Lust, Caution |
| 2 | Dinner Waltz |
| 3 | Falling Rain |
| 4 | Brahms Intermezzo in A Maj Op 118 No 2 |
| 5 | Streets of Shanghai |
| 6 | Playacting |
| 7 | Tsim Sha Tsui Stroll |
| 8 | Exodus |
| 9 | Moonlight Drive |
| 10 | Shanghai 1942 |
| 11 | The End Of Innocence |
| 12 | Sacrifice |
| 13 | Remember Everything |
| 14 | Check Point |
| 15 | The Secret |
| 16 | Nanjing Road |
| 17 | On The Street |
| 18 | The Angel |
| 19 | The South Quarry |
| 20 | An Empty Bed |
| 21 | Dinner Waltz (Traffic Quintet) |
| 22 | Wong Chia Chi's Theme |
| 23 | Seduction |
| 24 | Desire |

== Release ==
Lust, Caution premiered at the Venice Film Festival, where it won the Golden Lion, the second such award for Ang Lee. It was released in U.S. theaters on September 28, 2007, where it was rated NC-17 by the Motion Picture Association of America due to some explicit sex scenes. Lee stated that he would make no changes to attempt to get an R rating. After the movie's premiere, director Ang Lee was displeased that Chinese news media (including those from Taiwan) had greatly emphasized the sex scenes in the movie. The version released in the People's Republic of China was cut by about seven minutes (by the director himself) to make it suitable for younger audiences, since China has no rating system. Scenes of violence were also removed from the mainland version, and the total minutes of the cuts was around 30. The version released in Malaysia was approved by the Film Censorship Board of Malaysia without alterations and was rated 18SX—those under 18 are barred from the cinema. The uncut version was released on DVD in 2008, as well as R-rated version since certain rental outlets and stores like Blockbuster video did not carry NC-17 titles.

=== Home media ===
In 2007, two DVD versions of Lust, Caution were released: the original NC-17 version and the censored R-rated version. On March 30, 2021, Kino Lorber released the NC-17 version of the film on Blu-ray.

== Controversies ==
=== Censorship ===
In a number of countries, notably China and India, the sex scenes had to be cut before the film could be released. In Singapore, the film's producers initially decided to release a cut version with an NC-16 rating, but a public outcry stating that the producers of the film were underestimating censorship standards in the country (the film was released uncut in Hong Kong and Taiwan) prompted them to eventually release the uncut version with an R-21 rating. The film is rated R18 and was released uncut in New Zealand.

The following scenes were cut from the mainland China version:

- Wong Chia Chi walking past dead refugees in the street
- Stabbing scene cut to only one knife stab
- Two of the sex scenes featuring Wong Chia Chi and a male student, and three featuring her and Mr. Yee
- A nude shot of Wong Chia Chi at a window
- Wong Chia Chi in bed after being raped by Mr. Yee
- Dialogue modified in diamond ring scene so that Wong Chia Chi did not betray the resistance by warning Mr. Yee.

In a further example of censorship affecting the mainland China release of Lust, Caution, the line in which Wong whispers "Go, go quickly" to the Japanese collaborator that she has fallen in love with in order to save him from capture and death; in the edited version, Ang Lee changes this to "Let's go" in order to redeem the lead protagonist's sabotage of the assassination attempt of Mr. Yee by implicating them both in the escape rather than Wong sacrificing herself and her classmates alone. This form of censorship was done in order to avoid criticism for glorifying a traitor such as Mr. Yee during a time of Japanese occupation in World War II. Wong's betrayal of her classmates and China as a nation in order to save a traitor was received by some mainland Chinese audiences with distaste, with some media websites referring to the film as an insult to China.

The film's end credits are followed by a 18 U.S.C § 2257 notice.

=== Blacklisting ===
Tang Wei was ostracized from the mainland Chinese movie industry and did not work for three years because the State Administration of Radio Film and Television (SARFT) disapproved of her sexual acts in the film. All print ads and video content using Tang's image were removed and her endorsements were discontinued. She was set to star in Tian Zhuangzhuang's big-budget period film The Warrior and the Wolf (2009), but was replaced by Maggie Q. Director Ang Lee released a statement saying that he is "very regretful" over Tang's blacklisting and that he "will do everything I can to support her in this difficult time". Co-star Tony Leung stated that "our work is only to express our roles and I don't think that an actor should be blacklisted because of this" and that "the whole crew should have a responsibility. We are a team and not an individual, and I'm a part of this team". In February 2009, during her absence from the movie industry, Tang was reported to have briefly attended drama classes at the University of Reading in the United Kingdom.

=== Country of production ===
The film was co-produced by American companies Focus Features and River Road Entertainment, Chinese companies Shanghai Film Group Corporation and Haishang Films, and the Taiwanese Hai Sheng Film Production Company. The film was directed by Ang Lee, a Taiwanese citizen, and the actors/actresses are from mainland China, Hong Kong, Taiwan, and the United States. It was shot in Shanghai, the neighboring province of Zhejiang, Hong Kong (at the University of Hong Kong), and some locations in Penang and Ipoh in Malaysia used as 1930s/1940s Hong Kong.

Initially, the film's country was identified as "China-USA" by the organizers of the Venice Film Festival. However, the Venice Film Festival changed the film to "USA-China-Taiwan, China" on its official schedule shortly thereafter. When the film premiered at the event, Taiwan's Mainland Affairs Council protested the Venice event's use of "Taiwan, China" to identify films from the island and blamed the People's Republic of China for the move.

After the film's premiere, Taiwan submitted the film as its Best Foreign Film Oscar entry. However, the Academy of Motion Picture Arts and Sciences asked Taiwan to withdraw the film because key members of the film crew were not locals. Academy spokeswoman Teni Melidonian said in an e-mail organizers refused to accept the film because "an insufficient number of Taiwanese participated in the production of the film," violating a rule that requires foreign countries to certify their locals "exercised artistic control" over their submission.

=== Defamation ===
On September 13, 2007, an elderly lady, Zheng Tianru, staged a press conference in Los Angeles, claiming that the movie was about real-life events that happened in World War II, and wrongfully portrayed her older sister, Zheng Pingru, as a promiscuous secret agent who seduced and eventually fell in love with the assassination target Ding Mocun, alleging the characters were renamed to Wong Chia Chi and Mr. Yee in the film. Taiwan's investigation bureau confirmed that Zheng Pingru failed to kill Ding Mocun because her gun jammed, rather than developing a romantic relationship with the assassin's target. Ang Lee maintains that Eileen Chang wrote the original short story as fiction.

== Reception ==
=== Critical reception ===
On the review aggregator Rotten Tomatoes, the film has an approval rating of 73% based on 149 reviews, with an average rating of 7/10. The site's consensus reads: "Ang Lee's Lust, Caution is a tense, sensual and beautifully-shot espionage film". On Metacritic, the film had a weighted average score of 61 out of 100, based on 35 reviews, indicating "generally favorable" reviews.

The Chinese press gave the film generally positive reviews. In analyzing how successful Lee's film was as an adaptation of Eileen Chang's short story, literary critic Leo Ou-fan Lee wrote in Muse Magazine that he 'found [his] loyalties divided between Eileen Chang and Ang Lee. But after three viewings of the film, I have finally opted for Lee because deep down I believe in film magic which can sometimes displace textual fidelity.' In an earlier issue of Muse however, film critic Perry Lam had criticized Lee's direction: 'in his eagerness to make the movie appealing to a mass audience, Lee seems guilty of sentimentalism.' Sentimental or not, there is certainly a palpable trace of Lee's sympathy for Chang's personal love life, "It was hard for me to live in Eileen Chang's world...There are days I hated her for it. It's so sad, so tragic. But you realize there's a shortage of love in her life: romantic love, family love." He added, "This is the story of what killed love for her."

Audiences across Taiwan received the premiere of Lust, Caution with excitement stemming from pride over the fact that Ang Lee hails from Taiwan and the fact that the film received many international awards. The mainstream media in Taiwan built up an enormous amount of anticipation and fever for the world premiere of Lust, Caution with a continuous gossip channel focused on the explicit and controversial portrayal of sexuality which seemed to indicate to the positive, or at least curious reception of the film.

Jack Mathews of the New York Daily News named it the 5th best film of 2007. Kenneth Turan of the Los Angeles Times named it the 6th best film of 2007.

British actor Hugh Grant is on record as being a fan of the film.

=== Anachronisms ===
It has been noted by critics (including Bryan Appleyard) that the Hong Kong sequences in the film set in the late 1930s include "London taxis" of two types (FX3, FX4) that were only manufactured onwards from 1948 and 1958 respectively. The film features Japanese orthography that wasn't used before 1946 in a classroom scene. Tony Leung's wrist watch is not period-accurate for the 1930s. The size is much larger than a men's rectangular-shaped watch from this period.

=== Box office ===
Lust, Caution was produced on a budget of approximately $15 million.

In Hong Kong, where the film was screened uncut, Lust, Caution grossed US$6,249,342 (approximately $48 million HKD) despite being saddled with a restrictive Category III rating. It was the territory's highest-grossing Chinese language film of the year, and third highest overall (behind Spider-Man 3 and Harry Potter and the Order of the Phoenix).

The film was also a box office success in mainland China despite the cuts made to allow screening. There, the film grossed US$17,109,185, making it the Mainland's fifth highest-grossing film of 2007 and third highest-grossing domestic production.

In North America, the film received NC-17 rating, which severely limited the number of cinemas willing to screen it. In its opening weekend in one U.S. theater, the film grossed $63,918. Expanding to seventeen venues the next week, its per-screen average was $21,341, before cooling down to $4,639 at 125 screens. Never playing at more than 143 cinemas for the duration of its entire U.S. run, the film ultimately grossed $4,604,982. As of August 15, 2008, the film was the fifth highest-grossing NC-17 production in North America. Focus Features was very satisfied with the United States release of this film.

Worldwide, Lust, Caution grossed $67,091,915.

=== DVD sales ===
The film has generated more than $24 million from its DVD sales and rentals in the United States, an impressive result for a film that only grossed $4.6 million in limited theatrical release in the United States.

== Accolades ==
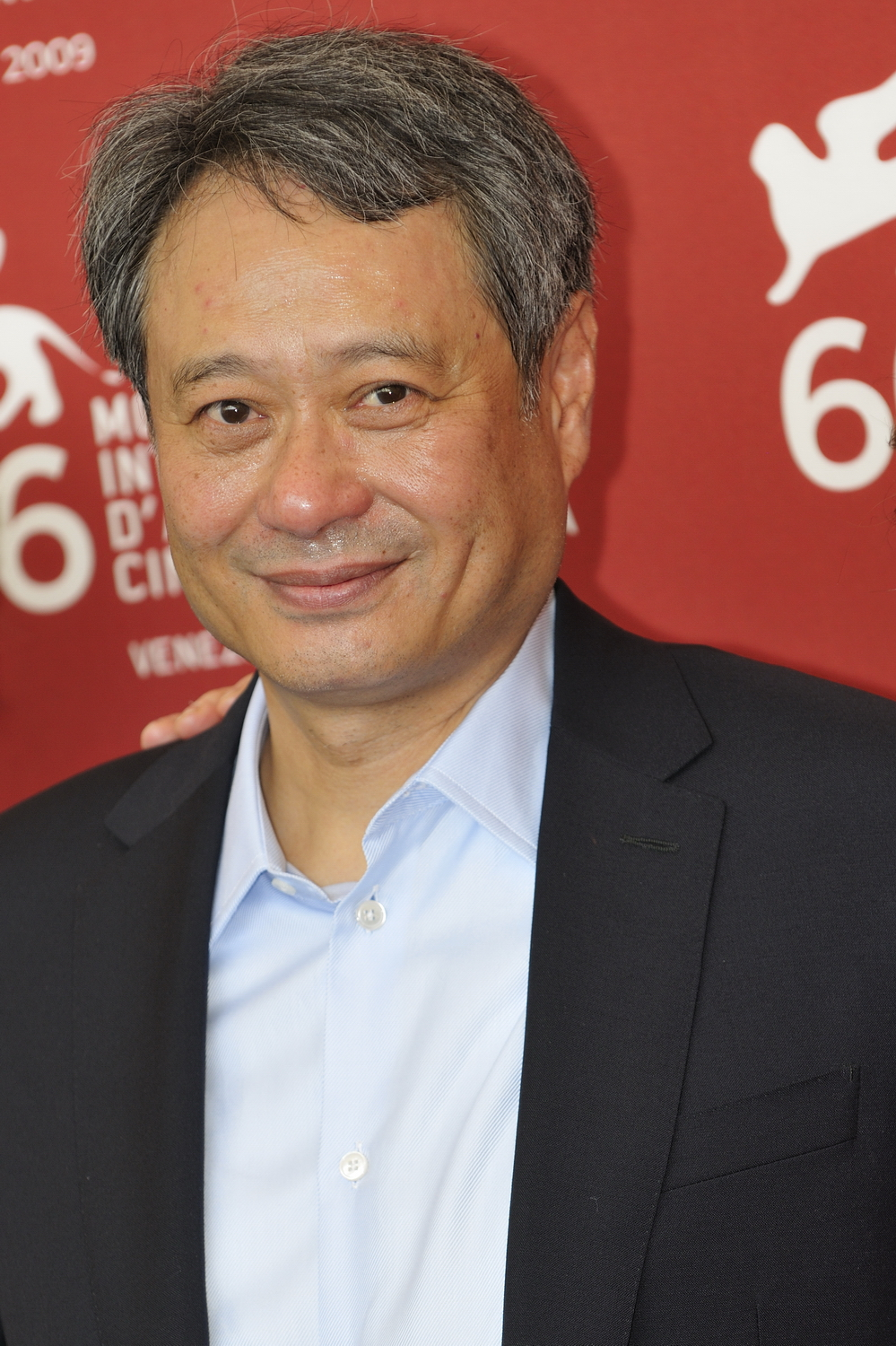
Ang Lee, director and producer

Won: 2007 Golden Lion International Venice Film Festival Award

44th Golden Horse Awards

- Won: Best Film
- Won: Best Director (Ang Lee)
- Won: Best Actor (Tony Leung Chiu-wai)
- Won: Best New Performer (Tang Wei)
- Won: Best Adapted Screenplay (Hui-Ling Wang and James Schamus)
- Won: Best Makeup & Costume Design (Pan Lai)
- Won: Best Original Film Score (Alexandre Desplat)
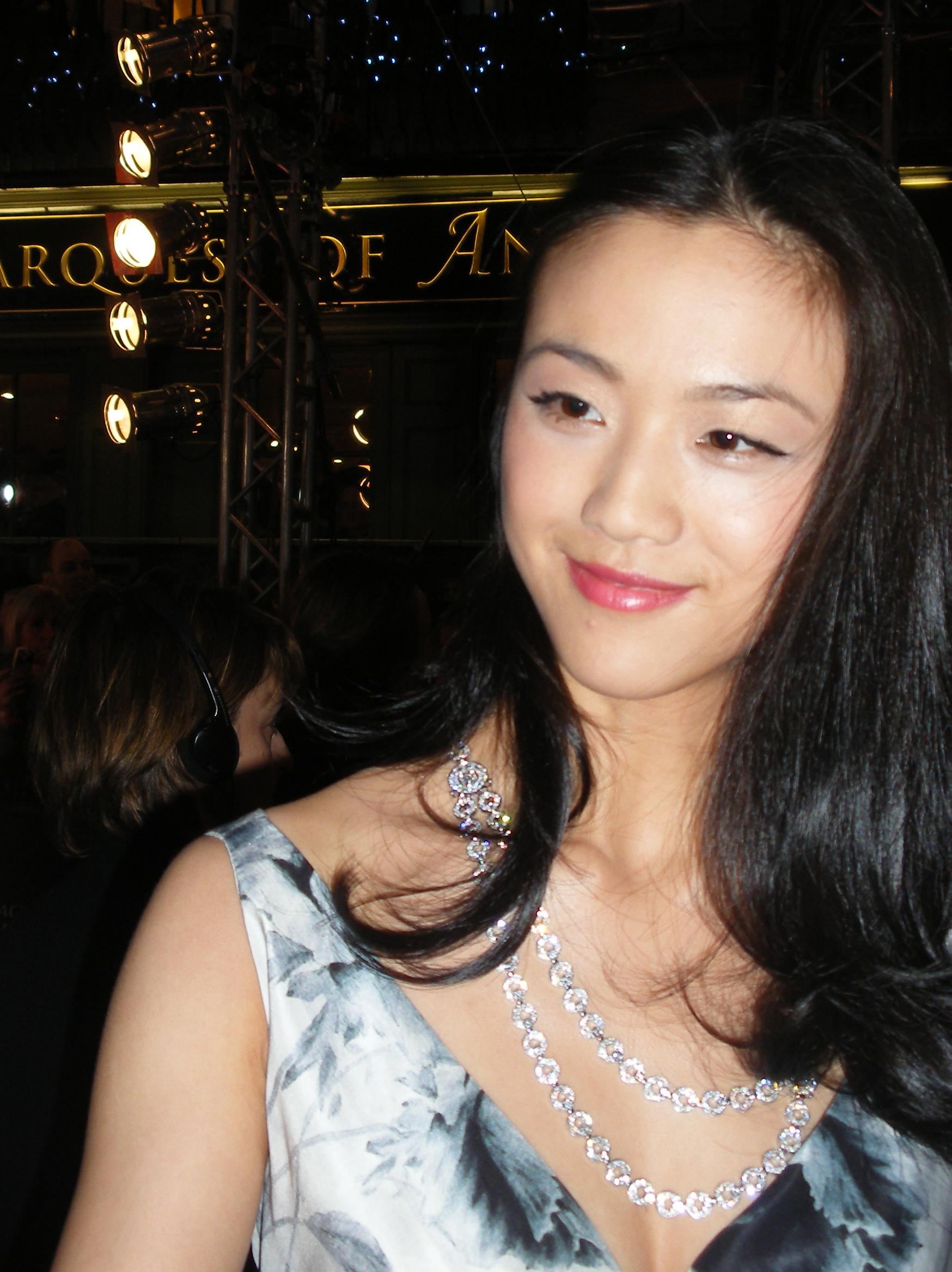
  Wong Chia Chi is portrayed by Tang Wei.
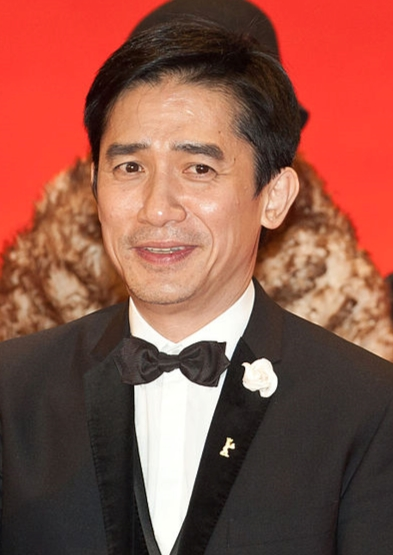
  Mr. Yee is portrayed by Tony Leung Chiu-wai.
- Outstanding Taiwanese Filmmaker of the Year (Ang Lee)
- Nominated: Best Actress (Tang Wei)
- Nominated: Best Art Direction (Lau Sai-Wan, Pan Lai)
- Nominated: Best Cinematography (Rodrigo Prieto)
- Nominated: Best Editing (Tim Squyres)

27th Hong Kong Film Awards

- Won: Best Asian Film (Ang Lee)

44th Guldbagge Awards

- Won: Best Foreign Film

65th Golden Globe Awards

- Nominated: Best Foreign Film

61st British Academy Film Awards

- Nominated: Best Costume Design (Pan Lai)
- Nominated: Best Foreign Film (Ang Lee, James Schamus, William Kong)
- Nominated: Rising Star Award (Tang Wei)

2nd Asian Film Awards

- Won: Best Actor (Tony Leung Chiu-wai)
- Nominated: Best Film
- Nominated: Best Actress (Tang Wei)
- Nominated: Best Composer (Alexandre Desplat)
- Nominated: Best Director (Ang Lee)
- Nominated: Best Screenwriter (Wang Hui-Ling and James Schamus)

Freedom of Expression Award

- Ang Lee was given this award at the ShoWest convention for his decision to release the film in the United States uncut, rather than editing the film to avoid the MPAA's NC-17 rating.

== See also ==
- Black Book (film)

Awards
| Preceded by After This Our Exile | Golden Horse Awards for Best Film; 2007 | Succeeded by The Warlords |
| Preceded by Riding Alone for Thousands of Miles | Hong Kong Film Awards for Best Asian Film; 2007 | Succeeded by Assembly |
