= Zhu Qinglai =

Chinese politician

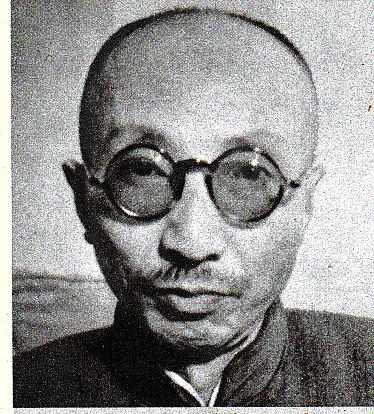
Zhu Qinglai (around 1940)

Zhu Qinglai (simplified Chinese: 诸青来; traditional Chinese: 諸青來; pinyin: Zhū Qīnglái; Wade–Giles: Chu Ching-lai; born 1881 in Shanghai) was a politician in the Republic of China. He was an important politician during the Wang Jingwei regime (Republic of China-Nanjing. His given name was Xiang (翔), but he was better known by his art-name Qinglai. He disappeared after the collapse of the Wang Jingwei regime.

== Biography ==
Zhu Qinglai went to Japan to study commerce, industry and economics Later he returned to China, he held positions in the Ministry of Agriculture and Commerce and in the Ministry of Finance. He established Shenzhou University (神州大學), and became its General Manager. He also became editor of the "Weekly Banking Magazine" and a professor at Shanghai Daxia University, Chizhi University (持志大學), Guanghua University (光華大學) and Zhongguo Gongxue (中國公學).

In 1934 Zhu Qinglai became a member of the Chinese National Socialist Party. After the Second Sino-Japanese War had broken out, he advocated opposition to the Second United Front in one Shanghai magazine.

In 1940 Zhu Qinglai participated in the Reorganized National Government of China and entered the Kuomintang (Wang's clique). He became Member of the Kuomintang's Central Political Commission and Minister for Transport of the Wang Jingwei Government. In next August he became Executive Member of the National Economic Council and Chairman of the Irrigation Commission. In August 1943 he was promoted to be Vice-Chief of the Legislative Yuan.

Zhu's whereabouts have been unknown since the collapse of the Wang Jingwei government.

== Footnotes ==
- Xu Youchun (徐友春) (main ed.) (2007). Unabridged Biographical Dictionary of the Republic, Revised and Enlarged Version (民国人物大辞典 增订版). Hebei People's Press (Hebei Renmin Chubanshe; 河北人民出版社). ISBN 978-7-202-03014-1.
- Liu Shoulin (刘寿林) (etc.ed.) (1995). The chronological table of the Republic's Officer (民国职官年表). Zhonghua Book Company. ISBN 7-101-01320-1.
- Mao Zedong (2008). Selected Works of Mao Zedong, Volume 2 (毛泽东选集 第二卷). People's Press (人民出版社). ISBN 978-7-01-000915-5.
- Committee for Problems of East Asia (東亜問題調査会） (1941). The Biographies of Most Recent Chinese Important People (最新支那要人伝). Asahi Shimbun.

Political offices
Preceded by office established	Minister for Transport (Wang Jingwei Government); 1940 — 1941	Succeeded by Ding Mocun
