= Xiang Zhizhuang =

Chinese general (1894–1946)

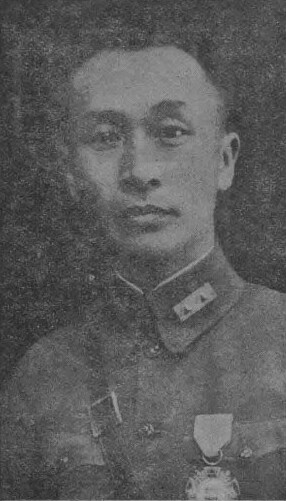
Xiang Zhizhuang

Xiang Zhizhuang (traditional Chinese: 項致莊; simplified Chinese: 项致庄; pinyin: Xiàng Zhìzhuāng; 1894 – November 26, 1946) was a military person in the Republic of China. He belonged to the National Revolutionary Army. In the end, he participated in the Wang Jingwei regime. His real name was Zongyu (宗羽) or Yu (羽). His former art-name was Zhizhuang (志壯), later changed to Zhizhuang. He was born in Hangzhou.

== Biography ==
In 1914, Xiang Zhizhuang entered the Baoding Military Academy's Artillery Department in the 2nd period. In May 1916, he graduated from this school.

In the National Revolutionary Army, Xiang Zhizhuang successively held the positions of chief of the Staff Office of the Headquarters of the 26th Route Army, commander of the 1st Artillery Brigade of the 1st instructing Division and commander of the Artillery Brigade of the Patrol Army in the Nationalist Government. In June 1932, he was appointed superintendent of education at the Artillery School, Ministry for Military Administration. Next July, he became the Councilor of the Ministry for Inspection of Training. In November, he worked as the chief of the Security Office etc. in Jiangsu. In November 1936, he was bestowed the rank of major general.

In November 1942, Xiang Zhizhuang escaped from the Chongqing National Government, and surrendered to the Wang Jingwei regime in Nanjing. In February 1943, he became a Member of the Military Committee. In April, he was appointed Vice-Chief of the General Staff of the Military Committee and Chief of the General Affairs Agency. In December, he also held the office of Commander of the 5th Group Army.

In February 1944, Xiang Zhizhuang was appointed Chief of the General Office of Colonization in Northern Jiangsu (蘇北屯總墾署署長). In June, he became Commander of the 12th Army. In September, he was appointed Governor and Commander of Security in Zhejiang Province, as well as Chief Security Officer of Hanzhou (杭州綏靖主任公署主任). Next May, he was appointed Member of the Nanjing Nationalist Government, and became Governor of Jiangsu Province.

After the Wang Jingwei regime had collapsed, Xiang Zhizhuang hid in Shanghai, but on September 27, 1945, he was arrested by the Chiang Kai-shek's National Government. He was convicted of treason and surrendering to the enemy (namely Hanjian) and sentenced to death by a military tribunal. He was executed by firing squad at Shanghai on November 26, 1946.

== Alma mater ==
Baoding Military Academy

Political offices
Preceded by Fu Shiyue	Governor of Zhejiang (Wang Jingwei Government); September 1944 — May 1945	Succeeded by Ding Mocun
