= Finding Mr. Right =

2013 Chinese-Hong Kong film by Xue Xiaolu

- Film poster
- Directed by: Xue Xiaolu
- Written by: Xue Xiaolu
- Produced by: Bill Kong; Mathew Tang; Lu Hongshi
- Starring: Tang Wei; Wu Xiubo
- Cinematography: Chan Chi-ying
- Edited by: Cheung ka-fai
- Music by: Peter Kam
- Production companies: BDI Films; Beijing H&H Communication Media; Edko Films; Edko (Beijing) Films; China Movie Channel
- Release dates: 14 February 2013 (Hong Kong); 21 March 2013 (China)
- Running time: 122 minutes
- Countries: China; Hong Kong
- Languages: Mandarin; English
- Budget: ¥30 million yuan (US$5 million)
- Box office: ¥518 million yuan (US$84.4 million)

Finding Mr. Right (simplified Chinese: 北京遇上西雅图; traditional Chinese: 北京遇上西雅圖; pinyin: Běijīng yùshàng Xiyǎtú) is a 2013 romantic comedy film written and directed by Xue Xiaolu. The film was a box-office hit, grossed nearly US$85 million in China. The title translates literally as "Beijing Meets Seattle". A sequel was released in 2016, Finding Mr. Right 2.

== Plot ==
Wen Jiajia is pregnant with the child of her boyfriend, a corrupt businessman in Beijing who is already married. She flies to Seattle so she can have her child in an illegal maternity center because of legal issues with giving birth to the baby in China. At Seattle-Tacoma International Airport she is picked up by Frank, a taxi driver who was a doctor in China, but came to Seattle in order to take care of his daughter, while his ex-wife, who works as a manager for a pharmaceutical company, has plans to immigrate to the United States. Later on Jiajia, listening to Frank's story, remembers the time when her father had a heart problem and recognizes him as a famous cardiologist. Off to a rocky start, she will gradually grow closer to Frank, his daughter and the women in the maternity center.

Jiajia's boyfriend is involved in a lawsuit and his assets are frozen, so she has to live without his money. She and Frank gradually become closer, developing feelings for each other. However, they go their separate ways when her boyfriend, after getting out of the lawsuit and leaving his wife, sends his driver to bring Jiajia and the baby back to China. The relationship doesn't work: her life is filled with luxury, but also lacking the care and affection she experienced with Frank, who she finds herself thinking back to. Realizing she doesn't love her boyfriend, she breaks up with him and starts a cooking website to earn the money to take care of herself and the baby, while her ex, who has no intention of supporting them, ends up going back to his wife. In the meantime, Frank puts his life back together and eventually starts working as a doctor again. Two years after parting, Frank and his daughter take a photo on top of the Empire State Building and send it to Jiajia, who replies with a photo of her and her son. Realizing they are in the same place, they meet on top of the Empire State building a la Sleepless in Seattle and join hands, beginning a relationship.

== Cast ==
- Tang Wei as Wen Jiajia (Chinese: 文佳佳; pinyin: Wén Jiājiā)
- Wu Xiubo as Hao Zhi (郝志; Hǎo Zhì)/Frank
- Hai Qing as Zhou Yi (周逸; Zhōu Yì)/Joe
- Mai Hongmei as Chen Yue (simplified Chinese: 陈悦; traditional Chinese: 陳悦; pinyin: Chén Yuè)/Moon
- Elaine Jin as Mrs. Huang (黄太; 黃太; Huáng-tài) a.k.a. Huang Mali/Mary
- Monica Song (宋美惠; Sòng Měihuì) as younger Zhuli (朱利; Zhūlì)/Julie, Hao Zhi's daughter
- Jessica Song (宋美漫; Sòng Měimàn) as older Julie
  - Jessica and Monica Song, the actresses for Julie, were 12-year-old twins from Richmond, British Columbia. They were auditioned by Judy Lee, the casting director, and tutored by Michael Bean, a talent coach.
- Theresa Lee as Dr. Tang
- Liu Yiwei as voice of Zhong
- Alex Dafoe as a doctor
- Clayton Chitty as Club Guy
- Michael Denis as Jose

== Production ==
Except for the opening credits, the entirety of the film was shot in Vancouver. The filming in Vancouver occurred in late 2012.

== Release ==
The film premiered in Hong Kong on February 14, 2013. It had its theatrical release in China on March 21, 2013 and in Hong Kong on March 28, 2013. The film grossed ¥518 million yuan (US$84.4 million) in China.

In November 2013 the film was released in selected United States theaters.

== Reception ==
Jeff Shannon of the Seattle Times gave the film two stars out of four. Shannon wrote that the film is "blandly generic and predictable from the get-go", has a "boring" English title and that it has a "never less than obvious" setup. Shannon added that the film is "a tolerably cute showcase for Tang Wei". According to Shannon, Seattle "gets the rainy-glossy, picture-postcard treatment" and that the film "does touch upon the notion of Seattle (and the U.S.) as a sensible escape from the garish materialism of Beijing and Hong Kong."

Derek Elley of Film Business Asia gave the film a six out of ten rating, referring to it as an "Okay but unspecial rom-com is driven more by technique than its script or lead chemistry."

The film's release caused an increase in Chinese tourism to Seattle, despite the entire movie being filmed in Vancouver, BC. Janet Christopher, the vice president of the tourism department of "Visit Seattle", stated "The phones started ringing and it hasn't stopped. We have been amazed at the response. This is bigger than 'Sleepless in Seattle.'" Due to the response, CCTV did a New Year's Eve live broadcast from Seattle in 2013, occurring in Kerry Park. The film caused an increase in romantic comedy films made in China.
