= Zheng Pingru =

Chinese socialite and spy

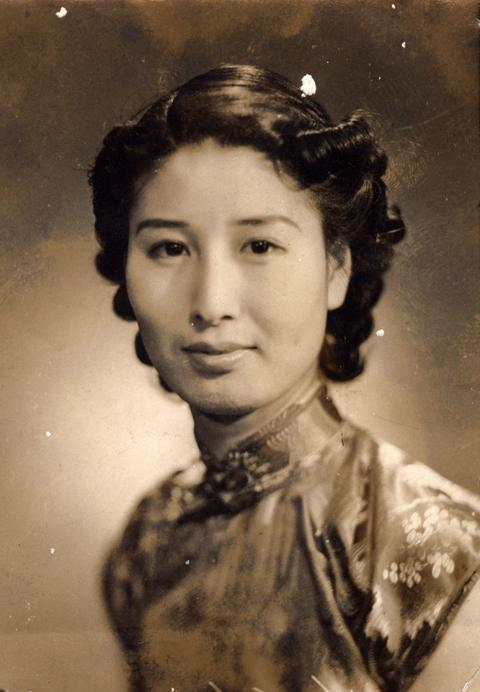
- Born: 1918; Lanxi, Zhejiang Province, Republic of China
- Died: February 1940 (aged 21–22); Shanghai, China
- Education: Shanghai College of Politics and Law
- Occupations: socialite, spy
- Parent(s): Zheng Yueyuan (father); Hanako Kimura (mother)
- Espionage activity
- Country: Republic of China
- Allegiance: Kuomintang
- Service years: 1937–1940

Chinese name
- Traditional Chinese: 鄭蘋如
- Simplified Chinese: 郑苹如
Transcriptions
Standard Mandarin
- Hanyu Pinyin: Zhèng Píngrú
- Wade–Giles: Chêng P'ing-ju
- IPA: [ʈʂə̂ŋ pʰǐŋɻǔ]

Zheng Pingru (1918 – February 1940) was a Chinese socialite and spy who gathered intelligence on the Imperial Japanese Army during the Second Sino-Japanese War. She was executed after an unsuccessful attempt to assassinate Ding Mocun, the security chief of the Wang Jingwei regime, a puppet government for the Japanese. Her life is believed to be the inspiration for Eileen Chang's novella Lust, Caution, which was later adapted into the eponymous 2007 film by Ang Lee.

== Early life ==
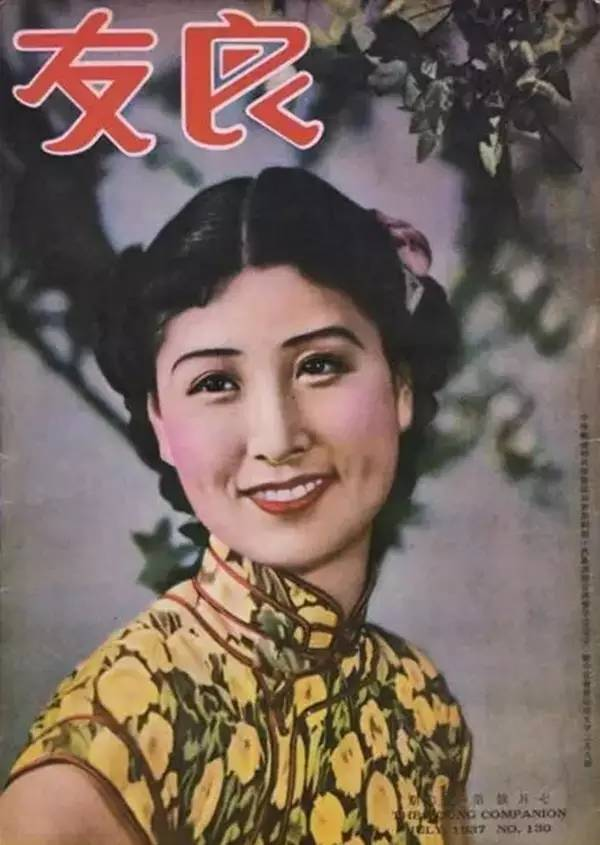
Zheng Pingru appeared on the cover of The Young Companion in July 1937

Zheng Pingru was born in 1918 in Lanxi, Zhejiang Province, Republic of China. Her father, Zheng Yueyuan (鄭鉞原), also known as Zheng Yingbo (鄭英伯), was a Nationalist revolutionary and a follower of Sun Yat-sen. While a student in Japan, Zheng Yueyuan married a Japanese woman, Hanako Kimura (木村 花子, Kimura Hanako), who adopted the Chinese name Zheng Huajun (鄭華君). They had two sons and three daughters; Pingru was the second oldest daughter.

From her mother, Zheng Pingru learned to speak Japanese fluently. She grew up in Shanghai, where her father taught at Fudan University. She studied at the Shanghai College of Politics and Law.

Zheng admired famous actresses Hu Die and Ruan Lingyu and wanted to be an actress, she performed with a group of actors from Datong University. But her father was very traditional and conservative, and was very opposed to her ambition.

She became a well-known socialite and appeared on the cover of the popular pictorial The Young Companion (Liangyou) in 1937. At the time, she was also becoming known as a musician and actress.

Although her family was half-Japanese, they were strongly opposed to Japan's aggression toward China. When Japan invaded Manchuria in 1931 and attacked Shanghai in 1932, Zheng and her siblings joined anti-Japanese protests.

== Wartime spy ==
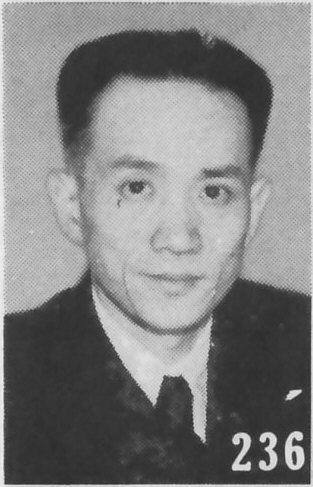
Ding Mocun, the Japanese collaborator Zheng attempted to assassinate

When Japan invaded China in 1937 and occupied Shanghai following the Battle of Shanghai, Zheng secretly joined the resistance movement and became an underground Kuomintang (Nationalist) spy. Her ability to speak Japanese and the connections to her mother helped her to spy and collect information on the Imperial Japanese Army.

Zheng was involved in a plot to assassinate Ding Mocun, the security chief of the Wang Jingwei puppet regime headed by Wang Jingwei. Ding was hated for collaborating with the Japanese and gained the nickname "Butcher Ding" for executing anti-Japanese resistance fighters. As Ding had formerly served as the principal of Zheng's secondary school, she was tasked with seducing him and luring him into a trap. Beginning in March 1939, Zheng arranged several "chance" encounters with Ding, and became his girlfriend.

On 10 December 1939, Zheng invited Ding back to her home at the end of a date where assassins waited inside, but Ding refused her invitation and the plan failed.

On 21 December 1939, Zheng accompanied Ding to dinner at his friend's house. After the dinner, Zheng requested Ding drop her off at Nanjing Road, Shanghai's famous shopping street. When the car drove by the Siberia Fur Company, Zheng said she wanted to buy a fur coat and asked him to help her choose one. Two Kuomintang assassins had been waiting nearby for a chance to kill Ding. While inside the store, Ding grew suspicious when he saw the men outside, and abruptly ran across the street to his car. Caught off guard, the assassins shot at Ding, but missed him before his driver sped away.

After the failed assassination attempt, Ding knew that Zheng was a spy and contacted her to meet him. Zheng hid a Browning pistol and drove to 76 Jessfield Road; when she was about to enter, she was arrested by Li Shiqun and held at Ding's intelligence headquarters.

Wang Jingwei's wife Chen Bijun and others attempted to persuade Zheng to join the Wang Jingwei regime, but she refused. Wang held Zheng Pingru as a hostage and tried to coerce her father to become the Minister of Justice for his regime, but he refused as well. This angered the leaders of the Wang Jingwei regime and they unanimously advocated killing Zheng. In February 1940, Zheng was secretly executed near the Zhongshan Road in western Shanghai, at the age of 22.

== Family ==
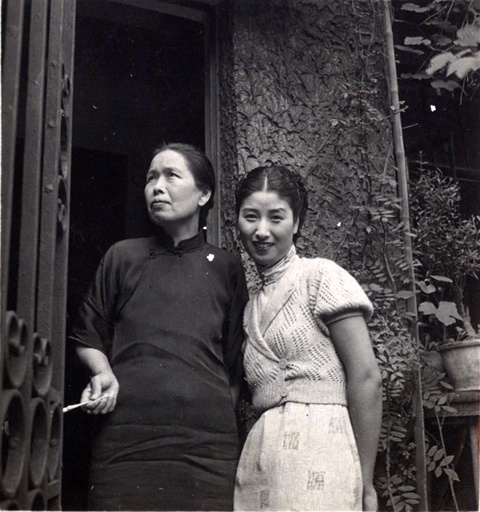
With her Japanese mother, Hanako (Chinese name Zheng Huajun)

After Zheng Pingru's execution, her father soon fell ill and died in 1941. Her brother, Zheng Haicheng (鄭海澄), was a fighter pilot in the Republic of China Air Force who died in battle on 19 January 1944. Her fiancé, Colonel Wang Hanxun (王漢勛), also a pilot who fought alongside her brother, was killed in action near Guilin on 7 August 1944. Her mother later moved to Taiwan and died in 1966 at the age of 80.

== Legacy ==
The Kuomintang government in Taiwan formally declared Zheng a "martyr", and the Chinese Communist Party called her an "anti-Japanese heroine". A memorial with a statue of Zheng was unveiled in Qingpu, Shanghai in 2009.

Zheng's story is generally believed to have inspired the character of Wang Jiazhi (Wong Chia-chih) in the novella Lust, Caution, written by Eileen Chang in 1979. Chang had learned about Zheng from her ex-husband Hu Lancheng, who served as a propaganda official in the Wang Jingwei regime.

In 2007, the novella was made into a film, Lust, Caution, directed by Ang Lee. In the novel and the film, Wang Jiazhi's assassination plot failed because she had fallen in love with her target. There was protest in the way that Wang Jiazhi was depicted since it was felt that her story "perversely twisted the heroic deeds of her prototype, Zheng." The Zheng family in particular felt that character based on Zheng dishonored her memory.
