= Finding Mr. Right 2 =

2016 Chinese-Hong Kong film by Xue Xiaolu

Book of Love
- Poster
- Chinese: 北京遇上西雅图之不二情书
- Directed by: Xue Xiaolu
- Written by: Xue Xiaolu; Jiao Mia
- Produced by: William Kong
- Starring: Tang Wei; Wu Xiubo
- Cinematography: Chan Chi-ying
- Music by: Peter Kam
- Distributed by: EDKO (Beijing) Distribution
- Release date: 29 April 2016
- Running time: 129 minutes
- Countries: China; Hong Kong
- Language: Mandarin
- Box office: US$140 million

Book of Love (Chinese: 北京遇上西雅图之不二情书), also titled Finding Mr. Right 2 in English, is a 2016 romance film directed and written by Xue Xiaolu and starring Tang Wei and Wu Xiubo. A Chinese-Hong Kong co-production, it was released in China by EDKO (Beijing) Distribution on April 29, 2016.

Book of Love is director-writer Xue Xiaolu's follow-up to the 2013 hit Finding Mr. Right, and it reunites her with lead actors Tang Wei and Wu Xiubo from the first movie, although the two films' plots are not related. Notably, the two leads have separate storylines throughout the movie, only communicating with each other through handwritten letters until their first meeting towards the end of the film.

== Plot ==
Jiao Ye (played by Tang Wei) is a casino hostess in Macau who accompanies customers as they gamble and earns a living from their tips. Her father, who brought her to Macau from mainland China, was an inveterate gambler who has since died, leaving her with a large pile of debts and a gambling habit of her own. Despite this, she is a good-natured girl who balances her money problems with a longing to find some meaning in her life and a boyfriend she has feelings for.

Daniel Luo (Wu Xiubo) is a real estate broker in Los Angeles who moved there with his parents from Beijing 20 years prior, although they subsequently divorced and both returned to China. Daniel has since built an outwardly successful life for himself in California, selling properties to wealthy Chinese buyers, but his parents' divorce when he was young still affects him, and he refuses to get into any kind of close emotional relationship.

Both Jiao and Daniel come across an old book, 84 Charing Cross Road, which tells the story of New York writer Helene Hanff and her 20-year correspondence with British bookseller Frank Doel, whose shop was at 84 Charing Cross Road in London. Daniel and Jiao, both in foul moods and blaming the book for recent misfortunes in their lives, decide to get rid of it by mailing the book to the address in the title. Unbeknown to either of them, the current proprietor of 84 Charing Cross Road, Mr Thomas, is an elderly gentleman who enjoys matchmaking and redirects the letters from Jiao and Daniel to each other.

Over the course of the next year, Daniel and Jiao begin a regular correspondence by sending letters to 84 Charing Cross Road, each believing the other to be a Chinese person living in London. Mr Thomas continues forwarding their letters without their knowledge. The letters are hostile at first, but eventually a genuine friendship develops. Jiao incurs a large debt and accompanies a rich client to Las Vegas to pay it off. Meanwhile, Daniel befriends an elderly Chinese couple who own a house he wants to buy, but since he knows they would never approve of his plan to tear their house down and replace it with two new ones, he tries an underhanded tactic to trick them into selling. As part of his plan, he also takes them to Las Vegas for a vacation, and nearly crosses paths with Jiao several times, although neither knows what the other looks like.

Daniel begins to feel guilty about what he is doing, and his plan is eventually found out by the old couple. Jiao's relationship with her client ends, and she and Daniel console each other through their letters. Around the same time, they also both decide to reveal their real identities to each other. However, Mr Thomas passes away before the letters admitting their identities can be forwarded on, and both Jiao and Daniel believe the other person has decided to break off the relationship. They also have no way of getting in touch with each other anymore.

Realizing their growing feelings for each other, and desperately seeking news of what has happened to the other person, Daniel and Jiao travel separately to 84 Charing Cross Road, where they learn the truth about who has been forwarding their letters, and are also told about Mr Thomas's upcoming funeral. At the service, they just miss finding each other, although Daniel realizes that Jiao was also in attendance when he sees a tribute card she leaves for Mr Thomas at the funeral. However, none of their attempts to locate the other person work. Having given up, both Daniel and Jiao return to 84 Charing Cross Road one last time to leave a farewell letter, where they finally meet. The film ends as the two stroll through London's South Bank at night, chatting about their lives.

== Cast ==
- Tang Wei
- Wu Xiubo
- Kara Hui
- Paul Chun
- Wu Yanshu
- Cherry Ngan
- Wang Zhiwen
- Lu Yi
- Zu Feng
- Wang Qian
- Liu Zhihong
- Zhang Yibai
- Ai Liya
- Sam Lee
- Chen Chuang
- Han Zhang

== Reception ==
The film was number-one on its opening weekend in China, with US$53.4 million.
