= Skiptrace (film) =

2016 Chinese-Hong Kong-American film by Renny Harlin

- American film poster

Chinese name
- Traditional Chinese: 絕地逃亡
- Simplified Chinese: 绝地逃亡
Transcriptions
Standard Mandarin
- Hanyu Pinyin: Jué Dì Táo Wáng
Yue: Cantonese
- Jyutping: Zyut6 Dei6 Tou4 Mong4
- Directed by: Renny Harlin
- Screenplay by: Jay Longino; BenDavid Grabinski
- Story by: Jay Longino
- Produced by: Jackie Chan; Charlie Coker; Damien Saccani; Wu Hongliang; Esmond Ren; David Gerson
- Starring: Jackie Chan; Johnny Knoxville; Fan Bingbing; Eric Tsang; Eve Torres; Winston Chao
- Cinematography: Chan Chi-ying
- Edited by: Derek Hui; Judd H. Maslansky; David Moritz
- Music by: Chan Kwong-wing
- Production companies: Dasym Entertainment; Talent International Film Cultural Company; Cider Mill Pictures; InterTitle Films; JC Group International; Talent International Media
- Distributed by: Beijing Talent International Film (China); Saban Films (through Lionsgate; United States); Bloom (international)
- Release dates: July 21, 2016 (China); September 2, 2016 (United States)
- Running time: 108 minutes
- Countries: China; Hong Kong; United States
- Languages: English; Mandarin
- Budget: $30–60 million
- Box office: $136.6 million

Skiptrace is a 2016 buddy cop action comedy film directed by Renny Harlin, produced, starring and based on a story by Jackie Chan. The film co-stars Johnny Knoxville and Fan Bingbing and follows Hong Kong detective Bennie Chan who teams up with American gambler Connor Watts to expose the identity of Chinese criminal Matador. It was released in China on July 21, 2016, and in the United States on September 2, 2016.

== Plot ==
In Hong Kong 2007, detective Bennie Chan has been tracking notorious crime boss Matador, whom he believes to be businessman Victor Wong. While tracking him, Chan's partner Yung Bai is captured. Yung sacrifices himself and gives his watch to Chan to remember him by. Nine years later, when Yung's daughter Samantha gets into trouble with Wong's crime syndicate, Chan must track down an American conman, Connor Watts, who gambles his way through Chinese casinos after being banned in the United States and witnessed the murder of a woman named Esther Yee in Wong's casino in Macau. However, before Chan can find him, Connor is kidnapped by Dima, a Russian kingpin, to answer for getting his daughter Natalya pregnant.

Chan rescues Connor and fights his way out with Dima's men. On their way to Hong Kong, however, Connor steals Chan's passport and burns it, forcing the pair to travel on foot to Mongolia, where they spend a night with the Mongolians. Connor subsequently reveals that Esther gave a phone to him before dying, which belongs to Matador. While crossing into China, Connor make a fuss leading to both of them being arrested by the police for various offenses as Connor would rather be imprisoned than being killed by Matador and his gang. They are ambush by Dasha, a Siberian hitwoman, and her gang, who wish to capture Connor and bring him back to Dima but they manage to evade her.

Connor sees Wong on the news and recognizes him as Esther's murderer. Chan learns that Samantha is already taken by Wong's enforcer Willie and his men, who threaten to kill her if Chan refuses to bring the phone back to Hong Kong. When they argue over their personal differences, they go their separate ways and Connor gives Chan the phone that will implicate Wong as Matador. While attempting to prove Wong as Matador, Wong's thumbprint does not match the phone's security thumbprint and Chan is arrested by the Hong Kong police instead. Connor, masquerading as a lawyer, helps Chan break out from prison. With the assistance of Leslie, Chan's co-worker, they bypass the phone's security and finds a clue to the Matador's identity.

Leslie informs Chan that their police captain, Tang, is now working with Wong. Chan and Connor sneak to the shipyard, Matador's criminal organization hideout. They witness Wong talking to Matador and being killed for his failure to bring back the phone. Attempting to rescue Samantha, the two are held captive by the criminal gang. Matador is revealed to be the supposedly deceased Yung. Yung taunts Chan for choosing honor while the former chose power. Yung then goes to see Samantha at the room where he explains that he faked his death to focus on his criminal career. Yung leaves Samantha locked up in a room.

After a boat hits the cargo ship, the ship starts to slowly flood the compartments. Dasha arrives with help to rescue Chan and Connor with police also arriving eventually. Chan and Yung work together to save Samantha from drowning inside the cargo ship with Yung committing suicide by drowning. Tang and Willie are then arrested by the authorities.

Connor goes back to Russia, fulfilling his honor, to witness Natalya give birth to their child. After the baby is born, it was evident that the baby is not Connor's. Later, Connor and Samantha surprise Chan back at his farm, providing him with alpacas to help fulfill his earlier-confessed lifelong dream of running an alpaca farm. Connor leaves with Samantha after attempting to knock out Chan via a technique taught by Chan himself. Chan is successfully knocked out after attempting to stay awake until Connor is out of sight.

== Cast ==
- Jackie Chan as Bennie Chan / Benny Black
- Johnny Knoxville as Connor Watts
- Fan Bingbing as Samantha Bai
- Eve Torres as Dasha
- Eric Tsang as Yung Bai
- Winston Chao as Victor Wong
- Yeon Jung-hoon as Handsome Willie
- Shi Shi as Leslie
- Michael Wong as Captain Tang
- Dylan Kuo as Esmond
- Zhang Lanxin as Ting Ting
- Na Wei as Office Wu
- Sara Forsberg as Natalya
- Mikhail Gorevoy as Dima
- Charles Rawes as Sergei
- Jai Day as Vladmir
- Richard Ng as Elderly Man
- Sabrina Qiu as Esther Yee
- Chris Verrill as Eugene

== Production ==
The film was first announced in May 2013 as Sino-American co-production to be directed by Sam Fell and starring Jackie Chan and Fan Bingbing with Chan playing Hong Kong detective Bennie Chan who allies with gambling conman Connor Watts to find criminal mastermind Matador. Exclusive Media is the agent for the international sales rights. On 22 October 2013, it was announced that actor Seann William Scott has been added to the cast as Connor. On September 3, 2014, Johnny Knoxville replaced Scott as Connor.

Production was due to begin on January 13, 2014, with filming set in Hong Kong and China. Filming then began on September 3, 2014, in China, and was due to end on December 15, 2014. On December 17, 2014, cinematographer Chan Kwok-hung drowned while on a shoot for the film.

== Reception ==
The film was number-one on its opening in China, grossing US$60 million. The film has grossed a total of CN¥870 million at the Chinese box office.

=== Critical response ===
As of June 2020, the film holds an approval rating of 38% on Rotten Tomatoes, based on 32 with an average rating of 4.53/10. On Metacritic the film has a weighted average score of 50% based on reviews from 9 critics.

Dennis Harvey of Variety magazine wrote: "Skiptrace remains lively, diverting, and essentially good-natured even when it's cheerfully dumb, exploiting its diverse locations for every last drop of local color." Neil Genzlinger of The New York Times gave a negative review and wrote: "Skiptrace settles for a warmed-over plot, tedious fight sequences and humor that's heavy on crotch jokes and pratfalls."
