= List of 2016 box office number-one films in China =

The following is a list of 2016 box office number-one films in China (only Mainland China).

== Number-one films ==
†	This implies the highest-grossing movie of the year.

Week	Date	Film	Gross	Notes
1	January 3, 2016	Mr. Six	US$68.67 million	
2	January 10, 2016	Star Wars: The Force Awakens	US$53.56 million	
3	January 17, 2016	Star Wars: The Force Awakens	US$44.13 million	
4	January 24, 2016	Star Wars: The Force Awakens	US$18.24 million	
5	January 31, 2016	Kung Fu Panda 3	US$52.22 million	
6	February 7, 2016	Kung Fu Panda 3	US$45.73 million	
7	February 14, 2016	The Mermaid †	US$277.04 million	
8	February 21, 2016	The Mermaid †	US$139.47 million	
9	February 28, 2016	The Mermaid †	US$61.84 million	
10	March 6, 2016	Ip Man 3	US$71.53 million	
11	March 13, 2016	Zootopia	US$87.92 million	
12	March 20, 2016	Zootopia	US$58.50 million	
13	March 27, 2016	Batman v Superman: Dawn of Justice	US$56.50 million	
14	April 3, 2016	Batman v Superman: Dawn of Justice	US$27.59 million	
15	April 10, 2016	Chongqing Hot Pot	US$26.67 million	
16	April 17, 2016	The Jungle Book	US$49.40 million	
17	April 24, 2016	The Jungle Book	US$50.24 million	
18	May 1, 2016	Book of Love	US$54.89 million	
19	May 8, 2016	Captain America: Civil War	US$96.60 million	
20	May 15, 2016	Captain America: Civil War	US$60.11 million	
21	May 22, 2016	The Angry Birds Movie	US$29.16 million	
22	May 29, 2016	Alice Through the Looking Glass	US$26.85 million	
23	June 5, 2016	X-Men: Apocalypse	US$59.58 million	
24	June 12, 2016	Warcraft	US$156.80 million	
25	June 19, 2016	Warcraft	US$24.16 million	
26	June 26, 2016	Now You See Me 2	US$44.37 million	
27	July 3, 2016	Teenage Mutant Ninja Turtles: Out of the Shadows	US$30.51 million	
28	July 10, 2016	Cold War 2	US$43.9 million	
29	July 17, 2016	Cold War 2	US$16.57 million	
30	July 25, 2016	Skiptrace	US$45.6 million	
31	July 31, 2016	League of Gods	US$29.8 million	
32	August 7, 2016	Time Raiders	US$66.1 million	
33	August 14, 2016	Line Walker	US$27.2 million	
34	August 21, 2016	Line Walker	US$16.9 million	
35	August 28, 2016	Jason Bourne	US$23.93 million	
36	September 4, 2016	Star Trek Beyond	US$30.44 million	
37	September 11, 2016	Star Trek Beyond	US$11.38 million	
38	September 18, 2016	A Chinese Odyssey: Part Three	US$18.19 million	
39	September 25, 2016	A Chinese Odyssey: Part Three	US$6.55 million	
40	October 2, 2016	I Belonged to You	US$35.06 million	
41	October 9, 2016	Operation Mekong	US$27.41 million	
42	October 16, 2016	Operation Mekong	US$22.04 million	
43	October 23, 2016	Mechanic: Resurrection	US$24.24 million	
44	October 30, 2016	Inferno	US$13.05 million	
45	November 6, 2016	Doctor Strange	US$43.66 million	
46	November 13, 2016	Doctor Strange	US$22.61 million	
47	November 20, 2016	I Am Not Madame Bovary	US$29.41 million	
48	November 27, 2016	Fantastic Beasts and Where to Find Them	US$40.45 million	
49	December 4, 2016	Your Name	US$41.29 million	
50	December 11, 2016	Your Name	US$15.44 million	
51	December 18, 2016	The Great Wall	US$67.61 million	
52	December 25, 2016	See You Tomorrow	US$40.02 million	
53	January 1, 2017	Railroad Tigers	US$23.26 million	

== See also ==
- List of Chinese films of 2016
