= Beautiful Life (Chinese TV series) =

- 笑着活下去; Xiào Zhe Huó Xià Qù
- Directed by: Lin Jianlong; Li Wenlong
- Starring: Yao Qiangyu (姚芊羽); Huang Haibo; Yang Mi; Sa Rina (萨日娜); Wang Lin (王琳); Chen Xiguang (陈希光); Jiang Yiyi
- Country of origin: China
- Original language: Mandarin

Production
- Production location: China

Original release
- Release: 26 October 2007

Beautiful Life (Chinese:笑着活下去) is a Chinese television series starring Yao Qiangyu (姚芊羽) and Huang Haibo. Premiering in 2007, the series was created by the team that produced the series Silent Tears and uses some of the same cast.

== Plot ==
Yian Yang was abandoned by her mother when she was 5; her mother was a widow pregnant with twins, and the rich man she was to marry would have broken off their engagement if he had known. Yang was adopted by a good woman who had a bad son, and a husband with a bad temper.

Growing up, Yang was harassed by her brother, and meets her birth mother, brother, and sister again. Yang faces many difficulties as the truth gradually becomes known to everyone, overcoming her troubles with a smile.
