= Lust, Caution (novella) =

1979 novella by Eileen Chang

- First English edition
- Author: Eileen Chang
- Original title: 色，戒
- Translator: Julia Lovell
- Language: Chinese
- Publication date: 1979
- English publication date: 2007

Lust, Caution (Chinese: 色，戒; pinyin: Sè, Jiè) is a novella by the Chinese writer Eileen Chang, first published in 1979. It is set in Shanghai and Hong Kong during the Second Sino-Japanese War. Reportedly, the short story "took Chang more than two decades to complete".

The 2007 film of the same name by renowned Taiwanese director Ang Lee was an adaptation of this novel. The story focuses on the plight of Wang Chia-chih and her involvement in a plot to assassinate Mr. Yee, who is a co-collaborator of a Chinese collaborator with the invading Japanese force. The novella was allegedly based on a true story of the wartime spy Zheng Pingru. According to David Der-wei Wang, Lust, Caution "drew controversy thanks to a biographical subtext: it seems to project Chang's own wartime experience as a collaborator's lover".

== Original manuscript ==
In 2008, Hong Kong magazine Muse released an unpublished English manuscript by Eileen Chang, entitled The Spyring or Ch'ing Kê! Ch'ing Kê!, an earlier draft of Lust, Caution. The manuscript was dated as early as the 1950s. According to an article in Southern Metropolis Daily, Chang willed all her possessions to Stephen Soong and his wife Mae Fong Soong in Hong Kong, but they later died. Their daughter Elaine and son Chinese-American translator Roland Soong inherited Chang's literary estate. An online newspaper article in The New York Times reveals that Roland Soong "was approached about making a film" from Chang's Lust, Caution upon returning to Hong Kong in 2003. Soong decided to release the manuscript when the 2007 film adaptation hit the cinemas.

The title of the work eventually adopted, Lust, Caution, is a pun. The character for "lust" (色, sè) can be read as "colour", while "caution" (戒, jiè) can be read as "ring", therefore the title can also read as "colourful ring", an object that plays a pivotal role in the story.

== Plot summary ==
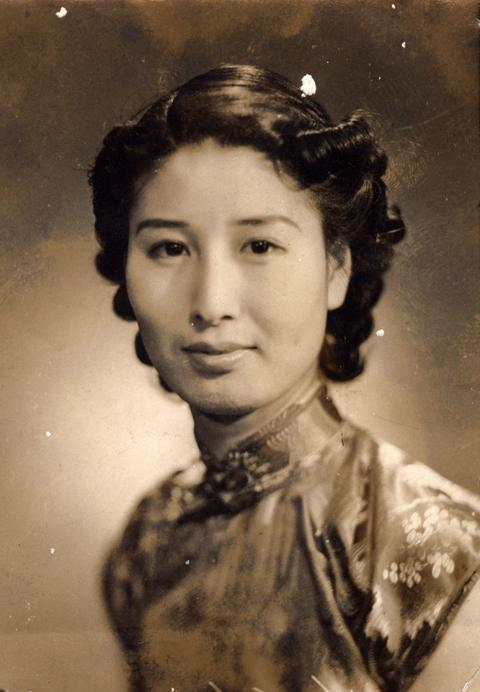
Executed Chinese spy Zheng Pingru, generally believed to be the prototype for Wang Chia-chih

During the Japanese occupation of China, Wang Chia-chih (Wang Jiazhi), a young former actress and drama student, along with other radical Cantonese students, takes on a dangerous mission to disrupt the Wang Jingwei regime. Wang is the man who has negotiated and collaborated with the invading Japanese forces to form a government in China. The radical group plans to assassinate Mr. Yee (Yi), a co-collaborator of Wang Jingwei. Chia-chih is assigned a role in disguise as the wife of Mr. Mai, a Hong Kong businessman who is made bankrupt after the bombing of Pearl Harbor and the fall of Hong Kong. Her task is to seduce Mr. Yee and facilitate the assassination.

Initially, the student conspirators plan to assassinate Mr. Yee during his stay in Hong Kong. However, the Yees unexpectedly have to leave for Mainland China. The group is disbanded due to a lack of funds and the low chances of getting close enough to Mr. Yee in order to kill him. During this period, the female student conspirators denounce Chia-chih as a whore because of her sexual relationship with Liang Jun-sheng, who is tasked with training Chia-chih as a seductress. The mission resumes after Wu, a member of the anti-Japanese underground resistance in Shanghai, offers to sponsor its continuation in Shanghai.

In Shanghai, Chia-chih becomes a part of Mrs. Yee's regular mahjong group. She seduces Mr. Yee and has a secret affair with him. Throughout their liaison, Chia-chih struggles internally between her personal attachment to Mr. Yee and her assignment to lure him into an assassination trap. On the day of the impending assassination, Mr. Yee offers to buy Chia-chih a rare diamond ring when they visit a jeweller to replace a gem from one of her earrings. As they wait for the jeweller to prepare a receipt, Chia-chih presumes that Mr. Yee's feelings for her are genuine and agonizes over the thought of his impending assassination. At the last minute, she simply tells him to run, a discreet way of warning him of the attempt on his life. He successfully flees.

Chia-chih and her fellow conspirators are captured in a blockade and executed on the information given by Mr. Yee. After the execution, Mr. Yee realizes his love for Chia-chih. Nevertheless, he deludes himself that the executions avert rumors of his affair from spreading. The novella ends with him leaving the room filled with the socializing Tai tais.

== Characters ==
=== Student radical group and supporters ===
- Wang Chia-chih / Wang Jia-zhi (a.k.a. Mai Tai-tai): A student actress turned assassin's spy, posing as the Tai-tai (wife) of Mr. Mai, a fictional Hong Kong businessman. Her (Mai Tai-tai) tasks are to befriend Yee Tai Tai and seduce Mr. Yee in order to make his assassination possible.
- Au-yeung Ling-man / Ou-yang Ling-wen (a.k.a. Mr. Mai): A fictional Hong Kong businessman who is made bankrupt with the bombing of Pearl Harbor and the fall of Hong Kong. His identity as a spy is Mr. Mai.
- Kwong Yu-man / K’uang Yu-Min: The leader of the student conspirators casts as a cousin of the Mai family. From the same region as one of Wang Ching-wei's aides from whom he extracts valuable information about Wang's inner circle.
- Wong Leui / Huang Lei:The wealthiest member of the student radical group. Since he is the only member who can drive, he serves as the chauffeur. He initially funds the mission until his father financially cuts him off.
- Leung Yeun-sang / Liang Run-Sheng:The only member of the group who has been inside a brothel. He is tasked with training Chia-chih to become a seductress. It is implied that due to his experience, he has sex with Chia-chih to train her to seduce Mr. Yee.
- Ng / Wu: An underground revolutionary. A member of the anti-Japanese underground resistance movement – who is based in Shanghai. After knowing of the assassination plot, he offers financial support for its continuation.

=== The collaborators ===
- Mr. Yee / Mr. Yi: The husband of Yee Tai Tai and advisor to Wang Ching-wei. Mr. Yee is the object of the political assassination plot. He is seduced by Chia-chih/Mai Tai-tai.
- Wang Ching-wei / Wang Jing-wei: Based on the historical figure Wang Jingwei. Wang formed a Chinese collaborationist government in Japanese-occupied Nanking between 1940 and 1944.
- Yee Tai Tai / Yi Tai-tai: The wife of Mr. Yee who has a good social position and material wealth. She has a group of female companions and is enamored with Chia-chih's youth.
- Ma Tai-tai and Liao Tai-tai: Members of Yee Tai Tai's entourage who are more interested with social status and material things

== Themes ==
=== Conformity vs individualism ===
To conform to the group meant that Chia-Chih has to do what is expected of her. The central figure in the assassination plot, her task is to befriend the Yees and seduce Mr. Yee. She follows her assigned script religiously, without question even when she was ostracized by her female co-conspirator for her alleged sexual encounters.

However, Chia-Chih's preference for love over politics serves as defiance of patriotism and nationalism. At the end of the assassination journey, she finds herself in a conflict. She chooses not to betray Mr. Yee. In Julia Lovell's afterword, "Chang created for the first time a heroine directly swept up in the radical, patriotic politics of the 1940s, charting her exploitation in the name of nationalism and her impulsive abandonment of the cause for an illusory love." In the story, Chang asserts that individualism should be prioritized over nationalism. According to scholar Yao Sijia, this is a radical notion in comparison to the conventional belief that individuals are subordinate to the nation.

=== Femme fatale ===
Lust Caution describes the storyline of Wang Chia-Chih seducing Mr. Yee. Chia-Chih uses her youth and beauty to ensnare Mr. Yee and helps plan for his assassination. The wealthy troupe member, Huang Lei funds the expensive plot where Chia-Chih acts as Mrs. Mak, the spouse of a wealthy businessperson. She initially befriends Yee Tai-Tai, Mr. Yee's wife, to get close to her husband. The two protagonists eventually begin an affair that sets in motion the planned assassination at a jewelry store. Chia-Chih uses her charm to enchant Mr. Yee, a honey-trap technique used in politics.

=== Love ===
The sensual attraction between the two protagonists develops into a more profound and dangerous connection. In the jewelry scene, Chia-Chih ponders on whether she had fallen in love with Mr. Yee. She informs him of the imminent ambush, and Mr. Yee dodges the attack. It is conceivable that his demise would trouble Chia-Chih. Mr.Yee contends that she loved him but signs her execution to avoid inquiries into his life and protect his reputation. In the novella, lust plays a vital role in depicting love as a commodity that is easily exchangeable and disposable.

=== Materialism ===
Chang uses both dialogue and detailed narrations of extravagance to explore materialism. For example, the affluent characters use golden chains to tie their cloaks. The author chooses precious chains to portray the desire to flaunt wealth. Mr. Yee decides to buy a diamond ring for Chia-Chih instead of a gem for her earrings. The appeal of the ring is vanity and mirrors Chia-Chih's perception of love that leaves her crushed. In addition, the description of feminine dresses, jewels, and a luxurious curtain in Mr. Yee's residence are all symbols of wealth and power in a war-stricken nation.

== Writing style ==
Lust, Caution can be categorized as a roman à clef in which elements of Chang's life and emotions are integrated into the novel. Wang Chia-Chih's romantic fallacy parallels Chang's relationship with her first husband Hu Lan-cheng who was denounced as a traitor for serving a propaganda official in the Wang Jingwei regime.

Eileen Chang uses an unconventional narrative technique in Lust, Caution. It is written in the third person interspersed with dialogues. The characters' inner thoughts are voiced by the narrator. Although those thoughts are introduced abruptly, the readers are able to decipher to whom they belong. According to scholar Nicole Huang, Chang's writing style borrows from the "illusory realm between memory and reality, brief moments between past and present, intersections between life and work, fiction and poetry, stage movements and everyday life".

== English translation ==
Lust, Caution was first translated into English by Julia Lovell and published in 2007.

1. Lust, Caution (色，戒). Translated by Julia Lovell. New York: Anchor Books, 2007. ISBN 978-0-307-38744-8.

== Adaptations ==
The adaptation by Ang Lee aroused controversial topics related to sex and nationalism. Peng and Dilly concluded as: "Yet even more controversial was the film's 'erotic politics': the torrid sex between the female spy and the collaborator, only vaguely implied in Chang's story, was turned into three explicit sex scenes with accompanying visual and visceral effects; the female protagonist's full frontal nudity touched off a raging inferno of internet criticism in China."
