= Wu Xiubo =

Chinese actor

- Born: 5 September 1968 (age 58); Beijing
- Education: Central Academy of Drama
- Occupations: Actor; Singer; Producer
- Years active: 1988–2019
- Agent: FWS (喜天影视文化（北京）有限公司)

Chinese name
- Traditional Chinese: 吳秀波
- Simplified Chinese: 吴秀波
Transcriptions
Standard Mandarin
- Hanyu Pinyin: Wú Xiù Bō

Wu Xiubo (Chinese: 吴秀波; pinyin: Wú Xiùbō, born 5 September 1968) is a Chinese actor, musician and producer. He rose to prominence for his role in the television drama Before the Dawn (2009), followed by a series of hit shows such as Angel Heart (2012), Divorce Lawyers (2013), and The Advisors Alliance (2017). He is also known for romcom Finding Mr. Right (2013) and its sequel Book of Love (2016). In 2018, Wu's career was suspended by an extramarital scandal.

Wu ranked 43rd on Forbes China Celebrity 100 list in 2013, 29th in 2014, 33rd in 2015, 26th in 2017, and 26th in 2019.

== Early life ==
Wu was born and raised in Beijing, China. His father, who died in 2007, was a diplomat, and his stepmother is a pharmacist. Wu has one older step-brother who is a physicist.

As a teenager, Wu became involved in the arts, particularly painting, drawing, poetry, and singing. In 1984, at the age of 17, he joined a state-owned theater company and was trained at the acting program of the Central Academy of Drama on contract. After graduating in 1987, he worked an assortment of jobs, such as running a restaurant, karaoke hall, and clothing shop. In the 90s, Wu became a singer popular with karaoke halls in Beijing. In 1995, Wu left the theater company to become a professional singer. He released an album in 1996 to lackluster reaction.

== Career ==
In 2001, Wu started working as an agent for his childhood friend, actress Liu Bei. In 2002, when his wife was pregnant, Wu returned to acting with the help of Liu and her then husband, TV producer Zhang Jian, who cast Wu as the leading man in the television drama Crime Investigate (2002).

Wu first drew attention for his performance in the war drama Sword & Spy, which won him the Most Popular Actor award at the TVS Award Ceremony. He rose to fame in 2010 for his role as an undercover Communist Party member in hit spy drama Before Dawn. The same year, he starred in the historical drama The Case of an Orphan named Zhao, for which Wu was nominated for the International Emmy Award for Best Actor.

In 2012, Wu starred in the medical drama Angel Heart, based on best-selling writer Liu Liu's novel. In 2013, Wu starred in the romantic comedy film Finding Mr. Right alongside Tang Wei, which was a box office hit. His success continued in 2014 when he starred in Divorce Lawyer, where Wu played a divorce lawyer trying to adjust to his new life after his wife's betrayal and the loss of his divorce case. The same year, he starred in the drama A Civic Yuppie in Countryside, for which he won the Outstanding Actor award at the Flying Apsaras Awards.

Wu starred in the musical television series My Youth High Eight Degrees, playing a club director who leads a gang of misfits with hidden musical talents, whipping them into shape and competing in the national choir competition. Despite achieving stellar ratings, the show was slammed for plagiarism accusations.

In 2015, Wu starred in the historical drama Troubled Scholarly. Wu and Tang then teamed up again to film the sequel of Finding Mr. Right, titled Book of Love (2016), which became the highest grossing Chinese romantic film of all time. In 2017, Wu played strategist Sima Yi in the historical drama The Advisors Alliance.

In 2018, Wu starred alongside Angelababy in the urban drama City of Desire, about two people of different world helping each other out of their battle with depression. The show, however, has been mothballed for Wu's extramarital scandal.

== Personal life ==
Wu is a Buddhist and vegetarian. In 2014, PETA named him as Asia's Sexiest Male Vegetarian Celebrity. Wu is also a billiards enthusiast.

Wu married He Zhenya in 2001. They live in Beijing with their two sons Hanhan (born 2003) and Xiaoyu (born 2007).

In September 2018, Chinese actress Ruby Chen went public with her seven-year affair with Wu. In January 2019, Chen was arrested by the police for blackmailing Wu, resulting in Wu receiving public criticism for his revenge on the ex-lover. The films and TV programs Wu was working on were impacted by the scandal, with some being canceled or editing him out of scenes.

== Filmography ==
=== Film ===
Year	English title	Chinese title	Role	Notes
1988	Gold Shoes	金鞋	Guo Fuhen	
2005	The Spirit of Nu River	怒江魂	Zeng Lama	
2011	Caesar	恺撒	Kaisan	
2012	People Mountain People Sea	人山人海	Xiao Qiang	
2012	The Four	四大名捕	An Shiqiu	
2012	Love Caused Deficiency	因情圆缺	Wu You	Short film
2013	Finding Mr. Right	北京遇上西雅图	Frank	
2013	The Four II	四大名捕2	An Shiqiu	
2014	The Four III	四大名捕3	An Shiqiu	Cameo
2016	Book of Love	北京遇上西雅图之不二情书	Daniel	
2017	Sky Hunter	空天猎	Lu Guoqiang	
2018	The Faces of My Gene	祖宗十九代	Mei Qiantu	
TBA	A Boyfriend for My Girlfriend	情圣2		

=== Television series ===
Year	English title	Chinese title	Role	Notes
2002		蓝色较量	Jin Yu	Cameo
2003	Heave Bird	天堂鸟	Jun Tao	Cameo
2003	Emphasis Detect	立案侦查	Hong Wu	Also soundtrack composer
2005		军人机密	Sima Tong	Cameo
2005		非常道	Lv Tianzhuo	Also executive producer
2005	Catching Snake	捕蛇行动	Yang Tao	
2005		阳光下的冰器	Guo Fei	
2005		离婚进行时	Wang Wei	Also planner
2006	Redaction Hero Tiger Courage	新英雄虎胆	Zheng Haotian	
2006		玉碎	Xiaoye Yilang	
2006	29 and a Half Days	29天半	Pan Yeshi	
2006		道可道	Luo Yi	Also executive producer and musical composer
2007	Tracing All	追查到底	Qian Haiyang	
2008	Behind the Femininity	温柔的背后	Jiang Chengyun	
2008	A Poem For the Oak	相思树	Kang Kai	
2008	Brothers	兄弟门	Jin Shan	
2008	My Depraved Brother	义本同心	Xiang Fei	
2009	Parted Lives, Never Parted Love	天涯咫尺	Liu Jin	Cameo
2009	Marriage in a Coma	昏迷不醒	Ding Shaofeng	
2009	Sword & Spy	剑谍	Fang Tao	
2009	The Wedding	嫁衣	Jiao Yang	
2009	Invincible Love	大爱无敌	Xie Yongkang	
2010	Snow Leopard	雪豹	Xu Bowen	
2010	Shanghai Shanghai	上海，上海	Gu Yecheng	
2010	Before Dawn	黎明之前	Liu Xinjie	
2010	Fire	追捕	Liu Tianshu	
2010	Brother's Happiness	老大的幸福	Policeman Yang	Cameo
2010		留神	Jake	Cameo
2010	Happy Memories of the Mas	老马家的幸福往事	Huang Aiguo	Cameo
2011		青盲	Situ Hui	
2011	Please Forgive Me	请你原谅我	Xu Tian	
2012	The Four	新四大名捕	Zhou Moru	Cameo
2012	Angel Heart	心术	Huo Simiao	
2012	Master Lin Is at Seoul	林师傅在首尔	Nangong Lie	Cameo
2013	The Case of an Orphan Named Zhao	趙氏孤兒案	Cheng Ying	
2013	The Patriot Yue Fei	精忠岳飞	Gao Chong	Cameo
2013	Mop Lady's Spring	抹布女也有春天	CEO Wang	Cameo
2014	Exceedingly High Road	大道通天	Zeng Tianjiao	
2014	My Youth Octave	我的青春高八度	Xiao Wen	
2014	Divorce Lawyers	离婚律师	Chi Haidong	
2014	Marriage Secret	结婚的秘密	Jiang Bo	Cameo
2014	Wan's Home Treasure	万家有宝	Wan Tianhe	Cameo
2014	A Civic Yuppie in Countryside	马向阳下乡记	Ma Xiangyang	
2014	Strange Coffee	怪咖啡		Cameo
2015	Tumultuous Times Scholar	乱世书香	Lu Shibai	
2015		山河同在	Zhang Zuolin	Cameo
2017	The Advisors Alliance	军师联盟	Sima Yi	
2018	The Drug Hunter	猎毒人	Lu Feiyun	Cameo
2019	Spy Hunter	天衣无缝	Editor Zhao	Cameo
TBA	City of Desire	渴望生活	Jiang Nianhua	
TBA	The Unknown Detective	无名侦探	Ceng Mou	

== Discography ==
=== Albums ===
Year	English title	Chinese title
2000	Love Battle	爱之战

=== Singles ===
Year	English title	Chinese title	Album	Notes
2000	"Can't Catch You"	抓不住的你	Heaven Bird OST	
2001	"You Are The Lover I'm Most Sorry To"	你是我最对不起的情人	Dui Ji Gan Qing OST	with Liu Pei
2002	"Let's Go Let's Go"	走就走吧	Emphasis Detect OST	
2004	"Keep the Innocence"	保留纯真	Bing Qi OST	
2008	"Slowly"	慢慢来	A Poem for the Oak OST	

== Awards and nominations ==
Year	Award	Category	Nominated work	Result	Ref.
2011	6th Huading Awards	Best Actor	Before Dawn	Won	
2011	17th Shanghai Television Festival	Best Actor	Before Dawn	Nominated	
2011	17th Shanghai Television Festival	Most Popular Actor	Before Dawn	Won	
2012	26th China TV Golden Eagle Award	Best Actor	Before Dawn	Won	
2012	9th China Golden Eagle TV Arts Festival	Best Performing Arts Actor	Before Dawn	Won	
2013	12th Sichuan Television Festival	Best Actor	Before Dawn	Nominated	
2013	19th Shanghai Television Festival	Best Actor	The Case of an Orphan named Zhao	Nominated	
2013	5th China Image Film Festival	Best Actor	Finding Mr. Right	Nominated	
2013	4th New York Chinese Film Festival	Outstanding Asian Artist Award	Finding Mr. Right	Won	
2013	10th Guangzhou Student Film Festival	Favorite Character	Finding Mr. Right	Won	
2014	5th China Film Director's Guild Awards	Best Actor	Finding Mr. Right	Nominated	
2014	21st Beijing College Student Film Festival	Best Actor	Finding Mr. Right	Nominated	
2014	32nd Hundred Flowers Awards	Best Actor	Finding Mr. Right	Nominated	
2014	14th Huabiao Awards	Outstanding Actor	Finding Mr. Right	Nominated	
2014	42nd International Emmy Award	Best Actor	The Case of an Orphan named Zhao	Nominated	
2015	21st Shanghai Television Festival	Best Actor	A Civic Yuppie in Countryside	Nominated	
2015	30th Flying Apsaras Awards	Outstanding Actor	A Civic Yuppie in Countryside	Won	
2015	15th Golden Phoenix Awards	Society Award	Finding Mr. Right	Won	
2016	28th China TV Golden Eagle Award	Best Actor	A Civic Yuppie in Countryside	Nominated	
2017	13th Chinese American Film & TV Festival	Best Actor	The Advisors Alliance	Won	
2017	2nd Golden Guduo Media Awards	Best Actor (Web series)	The Advisors Alliance	Won	
2017	8th Macau International Television Festival	Best Actor	The Advisors Alliance	Nominated	
2018	24th Shanghai Television Festival	Best Actor	The Advisors Alliance	Nominated	
