= Li Shiqun =

- 李士群
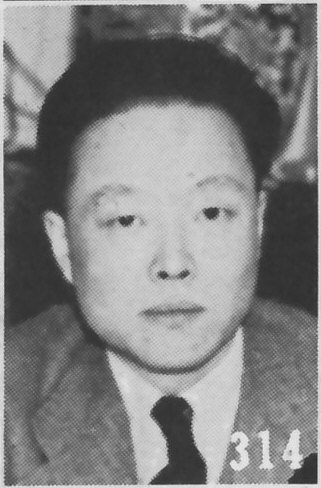
- Li Shiqun as pictured in The Most Recent Biographies of Chinese Dignitaries
- Born: 1905; Shanghai
- Died: September 9, 1943 (aged 37–38); Suzhou, Jiangsu
- Education: Shanghai University; Communist University of the Toilers of the East

Li Shiqun (Chinese: 李士群; pinyin: Lǐ Shìqún; Wade–Giles: Li Shih-ch'ün; 1905 – September 9, 1943) was a politician in the Republic of China. During the Japanese occupation, he was the head of the secret police Tèwu (also known as Jessfield 76, after the address of its Shanghai headquarters) of Wang Jingwei's collaborationist regime.

== Early life ==
Born in Shanghai, Li Shiqun graduated from the Shanghai School of Fine Arts and the Shanghai University. He also attended the Communist University of the Toilers of the East in Moscow. At the time of the Northern Expedition of Kuomintang, he became a member of the Chinese Communist Party (CCP) and was active in the Communist Party underground organization in Shanghai.

== Career ==
In 1932 he was arrested by the Nationalist Government authorities and defected to the Nationalists. As a member of the Clandestine Investigation Section of the Kuomintang Central Committee, Li Shiqun worked for Dai Li, the head of the security service of Kuomintang. In this job Li Shiqun made the Social News (社会新聞, Shèhuì xīnwén) magazine into an organ of the party intelligence. At that time his colleagues were Ding Mocun (the later head of Jessfield 76) and Tang Huimin.

The Second Sino-Japanese War broke out in 1937. At the direction of the party leaders, Li Shiqun hid in Nanjing after it was taken by the Japanese. In the summer of next year, Li Shiqun cooperated with the Japanese consulate in Hong Kong and in Shanghai. In early 1939 he and Ding Mocun were recruited by Zhou Fohai to set up a security organization for Wang Jingwei in close cooperation with the Japanese occupying forces under the command of Lt Colonel Haruke Keiin. In May 1939 Li was appointed the deputy head of the Tèwu, the secret police of the collaborationist regime.

In August 1939, Li Shiqun was elected to the party's central organization during the 6th General Assembly of the Kuomintang. At the same time, he held the office of deputy chairman of two committees: on oversight of special matters and on "clearance". As a result, Li Shiqun, who held a number of important offices and was a loyal friend of Wang Jingwei, surpassed in his authority even the head of the Tèwu and exerted great influence.

When Wang Jingwei formally inaugurated the Nanking government in 1940, Li Shiqun was appointed to be the head of the Tèwu as well as the deputy police minister and a member of the central committee. He has also served as a member of the Military Affairs Commission. In December 1940, Li Shiqun was promoted to the police minister.

From 1941 Li Shiqun also headed the Shanghai section of the Sino-Japanese Cultural Association, was a member of the Political Committee and the committee for managing social activities of the Executive Yuan (the Cabinet) of the Reorganized National Government. After the Ministry of Police was reorganized into the Ministry of Investigation and Statistics in August 1941, Li Shiqun remained its head. He was appointed governor of Jiangsu province in January 1943.

Li Shiqun masterminded a program euphemistically called "village clearance" (清鄉, qingxiang) focused on rooting out any resistance to the Japanese occupiers in the countryside. The area of the "clearance" included Jiangsu, Zhejiang and Anhui provinces, and parts of Jiangxi, Hubei and Henan provinces. Shanghai, Nanjing, Hangzhou, Wuhan, Xuzhou, Nanchang and other cities werealso included. It mainly targeted the New Fourth Army and other anti-Japanese guerrillas led by the CCP.

== Death ==
On September 6, 1943, Li Shiqun was invited to a banquet by the head of the Shanghai Department of the Japanese Military Police (Kempeitai), where Li Shiqun was poisoned and collapsed. On September 9, 1943, Li Shiqun died in Suzhou at the age of 38 from the effects of the poisoning. In the post-war period, materials from the trial of Zhou Fohai, the finance minister of the Wang Jingwei regime, alleged that Dai Li, the head of the Bureau of Investigation and Statistics of the Nationalist government in Chongqing, had ordered Zhou Fohai to assassinate Li Shiqun. Zhou Fohai put aside one million yuan to finance the assassination attempt. However, it still remains unclear who was behind the murder of Li Shiqun.
