= Ding Mocun =

Chinese spy for the Japanese (1901–1947)

- 丁默邨
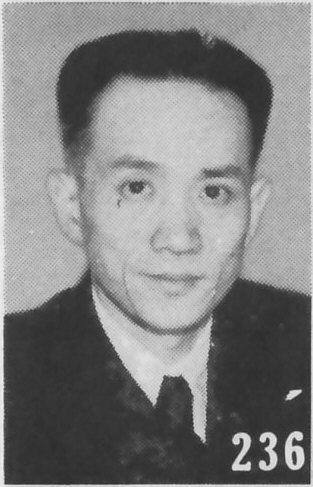
- Ding Mocun as pictured in The Most Recent Biographies of Chinese Dignitaries
- Born: 1901; Changde, Hunan, China
- Died: July 5, 1947 (aged 45–46); Suzhou, China

Ding Mocun (simplified Chinese: 丁默村; traditional Chinese: 丁默邨; pinyin: Dīng Mòcūn; Wade–Giles: Ting Mo-ts'un; Hepburn: Tei Mokuson; 1901 – July 5, 1947), also known as Ding Lesheng (Chinese: 丁勒生; pinyin: Dīng Lèshēng), was a politician in the early Republic of China. During Japanese occupation, he was a prominent figure in the secret police of the collaborationist regime.

== Early life ==
Born in Changde, Ding was initially a member of the Chinese Communist Party, but later became a Kuomintang politician active in Shanghai.

== Career ==
He rapidly rose within the Kuomintang hierarchy with the support of the so-called "Central Club Clique" led by Chen Lifu and by 1934 chaired the Research and Statistics Department, which was a cover for the Kuomintang secret police. However, when forced out of power due to numerous corruption scandals in a reorganization of the Kuomintang in 1938, he defected to the Japanese side along with Li Shiqun. Under the direction of Japanese spymaster Kenji Doihara, the two worked to create an intelligence and secret police security service, which was founded in April 1939 and whose headquarters was located at 76 Jessfield Road in Shanghai. This address contained holding cells, where suspected Communists and Kuomintang prisoners could be interrogated and executed.

Under the collaborationist Reorganized National Government of China led by Wang Jingwei Ding served in the Central Political Committee, the Military Committee, and the Executive Yuan of the Reorganized National Government. He later held the cabinet-level posts as Minister of Society and Minister of Transport in the Reorganized National Government and served at one point as governor of Zhejiang Province.

On December 21, 1939 he escaped an assassination attempt involving Zheng Pingru.

== Arrest and execution ==
Following the surrender of Japan and the collapse of the Reorganized National Government of China, Ding was arrested in September 1945 and charged with treason. During his trial, he pleaded that he had been serving with the Nanjing regime as a spy under the orders of Dai Li, the commander of Kuomintang secret service. He was convicted in February 1947 and executed in prison in Suzhou, Republic of China, on July 5, 1947.

According to the memoir of Chen Lifu, who served as a close advisor to Chiang Kai-shek and a friend to Ding despite his role as a collaborationist, Chiang Kai-shek personally demanded Ding's execution on the grounds that he had violated his agreement with the government after he was caught sightseeing by a journalist while being temporarily released to visit a hospital.

Political offices
Preceded by Zhu Qinglai	Minister for Transport (Wang Jingwei regime); August 1941 – January 1943	Succeeded by office merged with the Ministry of Construction
Preceded by Xiang Zhizhuang	Governor of Zhejiang (Wang Jingwei regime); May – August 1945	Succeeded by office abolished
