= List of TVB series (1978) =

This is a list of series released by or aired on TVB Jade Channel in 1978.

Airing date	English title (Chinese title)	Number of episodes	Main cast	Theme song (T) Sub-theme song (ST)	Genre	Notes	Official website
2 Jan	Vanity Fair 大亨	85	Adam Cheng, Damian Lau, Angie Chiu, Louise Lee, Chow Yun-fat, Cora Miao, Kam Fung Miu	T: "大亨" (Paula Tsui)	Modern drama		
5 Jan	The Romantic Swordsman 小李飛刀	13	Chu Kong, Yuen San Wong, Cecilia Wong	T: "小李飛刀" (Roman Tam)	Costume drama		
13 May	Heaven Sword and Dragon Sabre 倚天屠龍記	25	Adam Cheng, Liza Wang, Angie Chiu, Ha Yu, Idy Chan	T: "倚天屠龍記" (Adam Cheng)	Costume drama		
15 May	The Giants 強人	110	Louise Lee, Chow Yun-fat, Chu Kong, Maggie Chan, Wong Wan Choi, Susanna Kwan	T: "強人" (Roman Tam)	Modern drama		
2 Oct	Conflict 奮鬥	85	Chow Yun-fat, Angie Chiu, Bill Chan, Regina Tsang, Stanley Fung, Nam Hung	T: "奮鬥" (Jenny Tseng)	Modern drama		
3 Oct	Auntie Shirley 萬事有我	8	Rainbow Ching, Meg Lam, Go Miu-Si, Kwok-Leung Gan, Robert Leung, Albert Cheung		Modern drama		
5 Nov	One Sword 一劍鎮神州	25	Fung Bo Bo, Cecilia Wong, Adam Cheng, Susanna Au-yeung		Modern drama		
