= Conflict (1978 TV series) =

- Genre: Modern Drama
- Starring: Chow Yun-fat; Angie Chiu; Bill Chan; Stanley Fung
- Opening theme: "奮鬥" (Conflict) by Jenny Tseng
- Composer: Joseph Koo
- Country of origin: Hong Kong
- Original language: Cantonese
- No. of episodes: 85

Production
- Producer: Lee Tim-shing
- Running time: 45 minutes (85 episodes)

Original release
- Network: TVB
- Release: 1978 – 1979

Conflict (Chinese: 奮鬥) is a TVB television series, premiered on October 2, 1978. The theme song "Conflict" was composed and arranged by Joseph Koo, lyricised by Wong Jim, and sung by Jenny Tseng.
