= The Radio Tycoon =

- DVD cover
- Genre: Drama
- Screenplay by: Lee Sai; Wong Ka-wai; Tang kei-pui Siu Nga; Wu Sa; Chik Ying-ming
- Story by: Wong Ka-wai
- Directed by: Tam Yuet-ming; Lee Yiu-ming; Chow Cheung-kan; Clarence Fok
- Starring: Chow Yun-fat; Angie Chiu; Michael Miu
- Opening theme: Only Love You (愛定你一個) by Jenny Tseng
- Composer: Joseph Koo
- Country of origin: Hong Kong
- Original language: Cantonese
- No. of episodes: 30

Production
- Producer: Yau Ka-hung
- Production location: Hong Kong
- Running time: 45 minutes (30 episodes)
- Production company: TVB

Original release
- Network: TVB Jade
- Release: 3 January – 11 February 1983

The Radio Tycoon (播音人) is a 1983 Hong Kong television drama produced by TVB and starring Chow Yun-fat, Angie Chiu and Michael Miu.

== Music ==
The theme song, entitled Only Love You (愛定你一個) was composed and arranged by Joseph Koo, with lyrics provided by Wong Jim. The song was performed by popular Macau singer of the time Jenny Tseng.

== Synopsis ==
Wai Yip-cheung (Chow Yun-fat) returned from the United Kingdom to Hong Kong as a lawyer. Instead of pursuing the law profession like his family wants, he got a job as a radio DJ at a local HK radio station. Lui Hei (Michael Miu), the young and inexperienced young friend of Wai tries to get a job at the station. He soon falls in love with Au Yeuk-chi (Angie Chiu), who seems to be only paying attention to Wai. He now wants a job more than ever at the station, but many guys were also interested in her. The story revolves around the rather gossipy late-1970s radio station life and work. The story also feature a few sub plots.

== Cast ==
Cast	Role	Description
Chow Yun-fat	Wai Yip-cheung (韋業昌)	
Angie Chiu	Au Yeuk-chi (歐若芷)	
Michael Miu	Lui Hei (呂熙)	
Kwan Hoi-san	Yan Yu-hin (甄汝軒)	
Stanley Fung	Yan Ka-ying (甄家英)	
Kenneth Tsang	Yan Ka-kit (甄家杰)	
Chong Man-ching (莊文清)	Hung (阿红)	

== See also ==
- Air wave novel
