= The Price of Growing Up =

- Starring: Alex Man; Francis Ng; Carol Cheng; Kathy Chow; Stephen Chow; Kwan Hoi Shan
- Opening theme: "無限旅程" (The Infinite Journey) by Kenny Bee
- Ending theme: "仍然心在想你" (Still My Heart Was Thinking AboutYou) by Kenny Bee and Cally Kwong
- Composer: Joseph Koo
- Country of origin: Hong Kong
- Original language: Cantonese
- No. of episodes: 65

Production
- Running time: 45 minutes (65 episodes)

Original release
- Network: TVB
- Release: August 24 – November 20, 1987

The Price of Growing Up (生命之旅) is a TVB television series, premiered in 1987. Its theme song, "The Infinite Journey" (無限旅程) was composed and arranged by Joseph Koo, with lyrics by Wong Jim, and sung by Kenny Bee. The sub theme song, "Still My Heart Was Thinking About You" (仍然心在想你) was also composed and arranged by Joseph Koo, with lyrics by Wong Jim, and sung by Kenny Bee and Cally Kwong.

== Cast ==
- Alex Man
- Francis Ng
- Carol Cheng
- Kathy Chow
- Stephen Chow
- Kwan Hoi-Shan
