= Games Gamblers Play =

1974 Hong Kong film by Michael Hui

- Theatrical poster
- Traditional Chinese: 鬼馬雙星
- Simplified Chinese: 鬼马双星
- Hanyu Pinyin: Gúi mǎ shuāng xīng
- Jyutping: Gwai2 maa2 seong1 sing1
- Directed by: Michael Hui
- Written by: Michael Hui; Lau Tin-chi; Thomas Tang
- Produced by: Raymond Chow
- Starring: Michael Hui; Sam Hui; Ricky Hui; Betty Ting; Lisa Lui; James Wong; Roy Chiao
- Cinematography: Ho Lan-shan; Danny Lee Yau-tong
- Edited by: Peter Cheung
- Music by: Joseph Koo; Sam Hui
- Production company: Golden Harvest
- Distributed by: Golden Harvest
- Release date: 17 October 1974
- Running time: 107 minutes
- Country: Hong Kong
- Language: Cantonese
- Box office: HK$6,251,633

Games Gamblers Play (Chinese: 鬼馬雙星) is a 1974 Hong Kong comedy film directed by and starring Michael Hui, with action direction by Sammo Hung. The film also co-stars Sam Hui, who also served as one of the film's music composers.

Although very successful and netting more than 6 million Hong Kong dollars at the box offices, the film was criticized because there "gambling is no longer a social vice but a means by which one can get ahead quickly by achieving instant monetary gains. The concept of morality or righteousness is irrelevant: the utilitarian motive of individual accumulation of instant wealth is paramount."

== Plot ==
Man is a prison laborer who has a knack for conning others. Kit is a novice conman who has been caught stealing poker chips from another gambler in a casino. While in prison, Kit shares a cell with Man, where they discover their common interest in pai gow. They become friends and decide to devise plans to con their way into wealth.

Both are eventually released from prison. Kit tells Man about his plan to work together and gamble their way into riches, but Man expresses his concern about their lack of money before they can even begin to gamble. Kit assures Man that he has borrowed some money from a loan shark. Man has Kit arrange a game of pai gow.

Kit arranges a game of pai gow with some friends, including a wealthy man and his wife Pei-pei. However, Kit has very poor luck and soon loses all his borrowed money. He desperately calls Man to come over and help him, but Man refuses, giving the excuse that he has a stomachache, when in reality he just want to rest and relax. Having run out of money, Kit decides to leave the game and find Man. Pei-pei, on the other hand, plays well and wins $7,000.

Kit spends the night trying to find Man, but without luck. It is later revealed that Pei-pei is Man's mistress and that Man had been resting in her home. Pei-pei returns home to tell Man about the game, her winnings and Kit's losses. Man later discovers Pei-pei only has $1,000 with her and asks where is the rest of the $7,000. She then reveals she borrowed money from a notorious loan shark named Ching. She had no choice but to pay him $6,000 in interest. Man is intrigued by this loan shark, and later leaves Pei-pei's residence with $1,000. He then spots Kit sitting outside Pei-pei's home, apparently having spent the whole night waiting for Man to show up.

Kit is worried about getting enough money to repay the loan shark. Man reassures him that it is easy to gamble and win more money, but soon loses the $1,000 in a gambling den. Man then decides to bring Kit to his own home to meet his younger sister Siu-mei and his wife. Kit soon becomes attracted to Siu-mei.

One evening, Kit watches a quiz show hosted by Wong But-man and is able to answer every question correctly. Siu-mei is impressed by Kit's knowledge and suggests that Kit could win a lot of money by going on the show. Over dinner, Man asks Kit about what he thinks of his sister, and convinces Kit to go out on a date with her.

Kit eventually takes Siu-mei out on a date at the beach. While Siu-mei is changing in a changing room, Kit spots a group of gamblers playing poker nearby. He decides to con them by using his own cards to deal himself a full house, but is soon exposed by one of them, who notices Kit's cards. Kit is beaten up and badly injured.

After Kit sees a doctor, Siu-mei informs him that she has gotten tickets for him to participate in the quiz show. However, he refuses to appear on TV with his injuries. It was later decided that Man will take Kit's place. Initially, Man does poorly, as he fails to understand the hints given to him by Kit. But later he starts to do well when the following questions are related to poker.

Having won some money on the quiz show, Man and Kit treat themselves to a spa. Kit suggests another scheme for them to get rich quickly - by strategically betting on greyhound racing. Man is skeptical. Kit mentions a man he knows, Bully, a former pimp who works as a debt collector, who might have connections to get more money for betting.

Kit spends the next few days devising a strategy to beat in greyhound racing. He eventually tells Man of his plan - by placing heavy bets on the favorite, while placing smaller bets on the rest of the rounds as a way to maximise their winnings from the hot pick and minimise their losses by betting on the other hounds as a safety net. While impressed by Kit's plan, Man then tells Kit that his plan might not work if the favorite does not win, and especially if the bookies place their own bets on the favorite, reducing the odds. Kit then wonders what if the bookies forget to telephone and place their own bets. Man and Kit later meet Bully, who reveals that he has been working for a notorious and influential loan shark named Ching, who operates a large illegal gambling den. Man and Kit decides to gamble there.

Ching is a ruthless and violent loan shark, who regularly assaults his thugs for failing to meet standards and even guests who win too much in his place. Kit loses some money while Man wins some. They later meet Bully at a diner, who also tells Man that Ching enjoys playing Mahjong and often have the advantage of having extra tiles to win his opponents. Being a skilled Mahjong player himself, Man decides to have Bully arrange a Mahjong session with Ching and other regular players.

During the Mahjong session, Man puts up a good fight with Ching and is able to see through many of Ching's tricks, allowing him to win a huge sum of money from the disgruntled Ching. At the same time, he notices a bookie placing bets over a telephone, and remembers what Kit says about the possibility of bookies forgetting to telephone. He quickly realises that Kit's plan could actually work. He then decides to use the winnings and have Ching's bookie bet on the favorite through off-track betting.

Man and Kit agree to do the following: Kit will go to the greyhound track in Macau to bet on the remaining hounds, while Man will find a way to disable the telephone lines of the gambling den to prevent bookies from placing their bets. Their plan seemingly succeeds, with Man winning $320,000 from an increasingly irate Ching. However, Man's act of disabling the telephone lines is discovered by a street bum, who later informs Ching. Infuriated, Ching sends his thugs after Man.

Man and Kit's happiness with their newly gotten gains is short-lived, after Bully notifies Man that Ching knows about Man's sabotage. Man and Kit decide to hide at a resort. Seeing this as an opportunity to leave his wife and sister at home, Man also invites Pei-pei to the resort. However, Siu-mei and Man's wife also decide to go to the resort unannounced, as Man's wife knows that Man will be up to no good. She eventually catches Man and Pei-pei together in the hotel, resulting in an argument. To escape the ensuing argument, Man accidentally locks himself out of his room, only to realise that Ching and his thugs have tracked him to the resort. A long chase throughout the resort ensues, which involves barging through another hotel guest's (Lee Kwan) room, the lobby, a hairdressing salon, a Japanese restaurant and kitchen.

The chase ultimately ends in the resort casino, where Man tries to blend in with other gamblers but to no avail. Man ends up running to a craps table. He secretly switches the casino dice with his own to 'win' many rounds of craps, much to the astonishment of other players, the dealer and Ching. Man then admits to the dealer that he has cheated in order to be arrested by security, rather than falling into Ching's hands. Man is imprisoned once again.

Some time has passed, and Man is released again. He meets Kit outside the prison, who is revealed to be married to Siu-mei. Kit starts telling Man about another gambling scheme, but Man points out its many flaws. Kit then tells Man that he used this plan and lost $300,000 last week. Man realises that the winnings from Ching are all gone.

== Cast ==
- Michael Hui as Man
- Sam Hui as Kit
- Ricky Hui as Gambler at beach
- Betty Ting Pei as Pei-pei
- Lisa Lui as Siu-mei
- Roy Chiao as Man at milk bar getting parking ticket
- James Wong as Wong But-man
- Benz Hui as Bully
- Law Lan as Man's wife
- Dean Shek as Casino clerk
- Sammo Hung as Beach rascal
- Wong Sam as Boss Ching
- Cheng Gwan-min as Street bum
- Lee Kwan as Naked man in hotel room
- Chan Lap-ban as Blackjack gambler
- Chin Tsi-ang as Blackjack gambler
- Ho Pak-kwong as Jailer
- Fung Ging-man as Ching's dice croupier

== Partial soundtrack ==
Gwai ma seung sing is the debut Cantonese album by Hong Kong actor and singer Samuel Hui, released in 1974 by Polydor Records. The first two tracks are heard in the film and also released in the separate 7" vinyl.

All tracks are written by Samuel Hui, unless otherwise.

Side one
No.	Title	Lyrics	Music	English translation	Length
1.	"雙星情歌" (seung sing ching gaw)			Love Theme from (gwai ma) seung sing	2:58
2.	"鬼馬雙星" (gwai ma seung sing)			Ghost Horse, Double Star	2:25
3.	"甜蜜伴侶" (tim maat boon leui)	Ricky Hui	Ricky Hui	Sweet Companionship	2:43
4.	"無情夜冷風" (mou ching ye lang fung)	Ricky Hui	Ricky Hui	Merciless Breezy Night	2:38
5.	"一水隔天涯 (a) / 愛你三百六十五年 (b) (Note: Hui's combined rendition of both songs is heard in the 1974 film Naughty! Naughty! (綽頭狀元).)" (yat seui gak tin ngai / ai ni san bai liu shiwu nian)	James Wong (Note: Original lyrics of "yat seui gak tin ngai" were written by Joh Kei (左几) and are heard in the 1966 film of the same Chinese name. "Ai ni san bai liu shiwu nian" is a Mandarin rendition of the 1969 Japanese song, "Anata ga i nakute mo" (あなたがいなくても), sung by Mieko Hirota and lyricized by Rei Nakanishi, and was previously recorded by other singers.)	Yu Lawn 于粦 (a) / Shin Kawaguchi 川口真 (b)	Water over the Horizon / Love You for 365 Years	3:45

Side two
No.	Title	Lyrics	Music	English translation	Length
6.	"春夢良宵 (Note: Rendition of the 1972 song "I'd Love You to Want Me" by Lobo.)" (cheun mung leung siu)		Lobo	Good Night Dream	2:27
7.	"制水歌 (Note: Rendition of the 1972 song "Mother and Child Reunion" by Paul Simon)" (chi seui goh)		Paul Simon	Song of a Regulated Water	2:50
8.	"等玉人 (Note: Rendition of the 1965 song "Just a Little" by The Beau Brummels)" (dang yook yan)		Ron Elliott, Bob Durand		2:35
9.	"鐵塔凌雲" (teet taap ling waan)	Michael Hui		Tower Around the Clouds	3:05
10.	"夜雨聲" (ye yu sing)	Ricky Hui	Ricky Hui	Sounds of the Night Rain	2:16
11.	"雙星情歌音樂"			Love Theme from (gwai maa) seung sing (instrumental)	2:58
