= Vanity Fair (1978 TV series) =

- Promotional poster
- Opening theme: "大亨" (Vanity Fair) by Paula Tsui
- Composer: Joseph Koo
- Country of origin: Hong Kong
- Original language: Cantonese
- No. of episodes: 85

Production
- Running time: 45 minutes

Original release
- Network: TVB

Vanity Fair (Chinese: 大亨) is a Hong Kong television series that debuted on 2 January 1978 on TVB.

== Cast ==
- Adam Cheng Siu-Chow as Xu Shaoliang (徐绍良)
- Damian Lau Chung-yan
- Idy Chan Yuk Lin
- Angie Chiu Ngar Chi as Zhu Minzhi (朱敏芝)
- Louise Lee Si-kei as Wong Miu (黄梅)
- Yung Wai Man as Huang Mei (贺幽菊)
- Herman Kwan Hoi-San
- Shek Wing-cheung as Kong Qingtian (孔擎天)

== Music ==
The theme song "Vanity Fair" (大亨) was composed by Joseph Koo and lyricist Wong Jim, arranged by Joseph Koo and Choi Tak Choi, and sung by Paula Tsui.
