= The Brothers (1980 TV series) =

Hong Kong television series

- Opening theme: "親情" (The Brothers) by Roman Tam
- Composer: Joseph Koo
- Country of origin: Hong Kong
- Original language: Cantonese
- No. of episodes: 75

Production
- Running time: 45 minutes (75 episodes)

Original release
- Network: TVB
- Release: 21 April 1980

The Brothers (親情) is a TVB television series which premiered on 21 April 1980. The show's theme song "The Brothers" (親情), was composed and arranged by Joseph Koo, with Wong Jim, writing the lyrics. It was originally sung by Cantopop singer, Roman Tam.
