= The Invincible Medic =

- Starring: Lo Hoi Pang; Bill Chan; Maggie Li
- Opening theme: "仁者無敵" (The Invincible Medic) by Jenny Tseng
- Composer: Joseph Koo
- Country of origin: Hong Kong
- Original language: Cantonese
- No. of episodes: 20

Production
- Running time: 45 minutes (20 episodes)

Original release
- Network: TVB

The Invincible Medic (仁者無敵) is a TVB television series, premiered in 1980. Theme song "The Invincible Medic" (仁者無敵) composition and arrangement by Joseph Koo, lyricist by Wong Jim, sung by Jenny Tseng. The martial arts series are likely known for a Japanese style of props and culture.

== Cast ==
- Lo Hoi Pang
- Bill Chan
- Maggie Li
