= Hotel (Hong Kong TV series) =

- Created by: Wong Tin Lam; Selina Chow
- Written by: Li Tim Shing
- Starring: Chow Yun-fat; Cora Miao; Deborah Lee; Ng Chor Fan; Sheh Kin; Lee Heung Kam; Chu Kong; Miu Kam Fung; Gigi Wong; Lawrence Ng Wai Kwok; Law Lan; Kwan Hoi San; Soh Hang Suen; Damian Lau; Simon Yam; Susanna Kwan; Loretta Chu
- Opening theme: "狂潮" (Hotel) by Susanna Kwan
- Composers: Joseph Koo; James Wong
- Country of origin: Hong Kong
- Original language: Cantonese
- No. of episodes: 129

Production
- Running time: 45 minutes

Original release
- Network: TVB

Hotel (狂潮, literally The Ferocious Waves) is a Hong Kong television series, which premiered on 1 November 1976 on TVB. The theme song "Hotel" (狂潮) was composed and arranged by Joseph Koo with lyrics by Wong Jim and was sung by Susanna Kwan. Hotel was the first drama on TVB with a modern setting. The show's popularity was integral to the emergence of Chow Yun-fat's career. It is considered one of the most popular 70s series in Hong Kong television history, and has an average audience per episode of approximately 2 million people. Hong Kong government figures show at the time, the city’s population was 4.551 million.
