= Corner the Con Man =

1997 Hong Kong television series

- Starring: Bobby Au Yeung; Leo Ku; Monica Chan; Gigi Fu
- Opening theme: "精彩故事" (Splendid Story) by Roman Tam
- Ending theme: "難得有你" (Has You Rarely) by Roman Tam
- Composer: Joseph Koo
- Country of origin: Hong Kong
- Original language: Cantonese
- No. of episodes: 15 (Hong Kong); 20 (Overseas)

Production
- Running time: 45 minutes (15 episodes)

Original release
- Network: TVB
- Release: 6 January – 24 January 1997

Corner the Con Man (皇家反千組) is a TVB television series released overseas in December 1996 and broadcast on TVB Jade Channel in January 1997. It focuses on two policemen in the Royal Anti-Swindler Unit who work to put con men behind bars.

The theme song "Splendid Story" (精彩故事), and subtheme song "Has You Rarely" (難得有你) was composed by Joseph Koo, lyrics by Wong Jim, arrangement by Joseph Koo and Chiu Tsang Hei, and sung by Roman Tam.

== Synopsis ==
Jiang Yiju (Bobby Au Yeung) comes from a long line of card sharps and confidence men, however rather than using the skills he has learnt for crime, Jiang Yiju is instead a policeman of the Hong Kong Police Force who, together with a small squad of officers, uses his understanding of confidence tricks and tricksters to catch them. His choice of career however sees him come into conflict with members of his extended family dismayed to see their own tricks used against themselves.

Chen Weichen (Monica Chan) is Jiang Yiju's fiancée, wishing to put off marriage, Jiang has a long-standing bet with Chen, that if she can beat him at mahjong she can name the day of their marriage, with the knowledge that with his skills at the game that it would be impossible for her to do so without him throwing the game. However to his dismay Jiang learns after one such game (by examining the discards) that, having been together for so long, Chen has learnt enough of his own card sharping skills to be able to beat him and that it has been her that has been throwing the games in his favour. Realising that this means that she is on the verge of giving up on their relationship Jiang must therefore ask himself does he love being a bachelor more than Chen?

== Cast ==
- Jiang Yiju (Bobby Au Yeung)-An inspector of the Hong Kong Police Force
- Chéng Guodong (Leo Ku)-A policeman of the Hong Kong Police Force
- Wen Jiabao (Gigi Fu)-A police woman of the Hong Kong Police Force
- Chen Weichen (Monica Chan)-Jiang Yiju's fiancée
