= The Battlefield =

Hong Kong historical drama television series

- DVD cover art
- Also known as: Chor Ho Hon Kai
- Traditional Chinese: 楚河漢界
- Simplified Chinese: 楚河汉界
- Jyutping: Co2 Ho4 Hon3 Gaai3
- Genre: Historical drama
- Written by: Ng Yuk-cheung; Leung Wing-mui; Ng Pan-wah; Yeung Wing-cheung
- Directed by: Ng Chun-shing; Chik Kei-yee; Tam Chui-ming; See-to Lap-kwong
- Starring: Shek Sau; Lawrence Ng; Idy Chan; Kiki Sheung
- Opening theme: Chor Ho Hon Kai (楚河漢界) performed by Alan Tam; 2. Chor Kor (楚歌) performed by Jacky Cheung
- Ending theme: Ba Wong Pit Kei (霸王別姬) performed by Jacky Cheung and Serina Ha
- Composers: Joseph Koo; James Wong
- Country of origin: Hong Kong
- Original language: Cantonese
- No. of episodes: 30

Production
- Producer: Lee Ting-lun
- Production location: Hong Kong
- Running time: 45 minutes per episode
- Production company: TVB

Original release
- Network: TVB Jade
- Release: 5 August – 13 September 1985

The Battlefield is a Hong Kong television series loosely based on the events in the Chu–Han Contention, an interregnum between the fall of the Qin dynasty and the founding of the Han dynasty. It was first broadcast in 1985 in Hong Kong on TVB Jade. in 2004, The Conqueror's Story was 1st airing of the sequel.

== Plot ==
Two heroes emerged in the final years of the Qin dynasty. They are Lau Bong and Hung Yu. Both of them were initially close friends, but later became rivals in a power struggle for supremacy over China historically known as the Chu–Han Contention.

Hon Sun meets Cheung Leung by coincidence and they strike up a friendship. Hon Sun remains on Hung Yu's side while Cheung Leung decides to serve Lau Bong. Not long later, Hon Sun leaves Hung Yu and is introduced to Lau Bong by Siu Ho. Hon Sun and Cheung Leung work together to help Lau Bong achieve his dream of ruling China.

Yuk Dip-yee is a Qin spy sent to investigate the Hung family being suspected of rebellion. However, she falls in love with Hung Yu and is unable to bring herself to betray him. She eventually dies at the hands of Hung Yu's uncle, Hung Leung. Subsequently, a beauty called Consort Yu appears and becomes the subject of a love rivalry between Hung Yu and Lau Bong. Hung Yu eventually wins Consort Yu's heart. In anger, Lau Bong marries Lui Chi, intending to use her father to help him deal with Hung Yu. This marks the beginning of the war between Lau Bong and Hung Yu.

== Cast ==
Note: Some of the characters' names are in Cantonese romanisation.

- Shek Sau as Hung Yu
- Lawrence Ng as Lau Bong
- Idy Chan as Consort Yu
- Kiki Sheung as Lui Chi
- Paul Chun as Hung Leung
- Austin Wai as Hon Sun
- Newton Lai as Cheung Leung
- Lau Kong as Siu Ho
- Barbara Yung as Yuk Dip-yee (Jade Butterfly). Secret agent of the Imperial Court. "butterfly" is a Chinese homophone to "spy"
- Lau Siu-ming as Chiu Ko
- Lam Tin as Lei See
- Lung Tin-sang as Wu-hoi
- Jimmy Wong as Tze-ying
- Lau Suk-yee as Keung Lan
- Ng Man-tat as Lui Chi's father

== new remaking ==
Adam Cheng roled as new lau bong at age of 35 in a new remaking TV series. many roles and casts are new generation to remake a new sequel in 2004.
