= The Misadventure of Zoo =

- Starring: Adam Cheng; Louise Lee; Tang Pik-wan; Lydia Shum
- Opening theme: "做人愛自由" (Personhood Loves Freedom) by Adam Cheng
- Ending theme: "飲勝" (Cheers) by Adam Cheng
- Composer: Joseph Koo
- Country of origin: Hong Kong
- Original language: Cantonese
- No. of episodes: 20

Production
- Running time: 45 minutes (20 episodes)

Original release
- Network: TVB

The Misadventure of Zoo (流氓皇帝) is a TVB television series, premiered in 1981.

== Plot ==
The story centers around a villager named Chu Gam Chun (朱錦春, a homophone of the term 豬咁蠢, a Cantonese slang term meaning "as stupid as a pig"). One day, a soothsayer said he would one day become the penultimate Emperor of China. While he initially brushed it aside, a series of events and blunders would eventually make it come true.

When the Qing Dynasty fell, Chu and his villager friends became bandits, only to be recruited by a warlord. Once under their command, Chu quickly rose through the ranks when many of his superiors died in accidents that are not of Chu's making. Chu eventually became a warlord himself, but was later defeated by Nationalist forces.

Chu, along with his friends and family, made their way to Shanghai, where he eventually became an A-list movie star, even though Chu is illiterate, and can't read movie scripts. Chu then went from strength to strength, and eventually opened a department store. There, he was discovered by a Japanese spy, who wanted him to be a body double of Puyi, by then the Emperor of Manchukuo. The soothsayer's words have finally come true.

Eventually, Chu found out about the Japanese's deeds, and decided to leave his life as Emperor. He was separated from his family members while they were escaping, and Chu eventually ended up in Hong Kong as a beggar. Only when a local reporter found out about his story did Chu reunite with his family, as well as his longtime lover, who now works as a maid for the reporter's family.

Chu and his lover were reunited in the finale. At the same time, Chu discovered that he has won the Mark Six lottery drawing. However, realizing his desire to simply live out his life without dramatic ups and downs, Chu ripped up the lottery ticket.

== Cast ==
Most of the character's name in the series are Cantonese homophones of another term.

- Adam Cheng as Chu Gam Chun (朱錦春, homophone of the term "as Stupid as a Pig" (豬咁蠢))
- Tang Bick Wan as Yau Yu See (尤如絲, homophone of the term "Calamari Shreds" (魷魚絲), a popular snack in Hong Kong)
- Chun Wong as Chu Cheung Fun (朱祥芬, homophone of the term "Rice noodle roll" (豬腸粉))
- Loong Tin Sang as Mok Yi Mo (莫二毛)
- Tsang Cho Lum as Lo Dai Gau (勞大舊)
- Chan Gwok Kuen as Ngau Yuk Gon (牛玉乾, homophone of the term "Beef Jerky" (牛肉乾))

== Theme songs ==
- Theme song: "Personhood Loves Freedom" (做人愛自由): composition and arrangement by Joseph Koo, lyrics by Wong Jim, sung by Adam Cheng
- Sub theme song: "Cheers" (飲勝): composition and arrangement by Joseph Koo, lyrics by Wong Jim, sung by Adam Cheng
