= James Wong Jim =

Hong Kong lyricist and songwriter (1941–2004)

- 黃霑
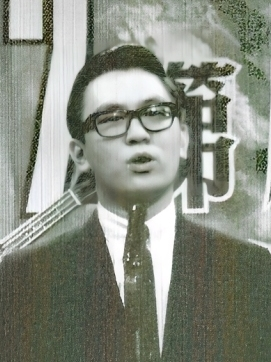
- Born: Wong Jum-sum; 18 March 1941; Panyu, Guangzhou, Republic of China
- Died: 24 November 2004 (aged 63); Union Hospital, Hong Kong
- Other names: James Wong; Wong Jim; Uncle Jim
- Education: University of Hong Kong (ph.D, mPhil , Upper second class honoured B.A.)
- Occupations: Lyricist; songwriter; television presenter; actor; film director; screenwriter; advertising creative director
- Years active: 1962–2004
- Spouses: Wah Wa (m. 1967; div. 1976) Winnie Chan (m. 1995)
- Partner(s): Eunice Lam (1976–1990)
- Children: 3
- Awards: Hong Kong Film Awards – Best Original Film Score; 1988 A Chinese Ghost Story; 1991 Fight and Love with a Terracotta Warrior; 1992 Once Upon a Time in China; 1995 Butterfly Lovers; Best Original Film Song; 1988 A Chinese Ghost Story; 1991 The Swordsman Golden Horse Awards – Best Original Song; 1992 Once Upon a Time in China II
- Musical career
- Origin: Hong Kong, China
- Genre: Cantopop
- Instruments: Vocals; piano; harmonica

Chinese name
- Traditional Chinese: 黃霑
- Simplified Chinese: 黄沾
Transcriptions
Standard Mandarin
- Hanyu Pinyin: Huáng Zhān
Yue: Cantonese
- Jyutping: Wong4 Zim1

Wong Jum-sum
- Traditional Chinese: 黃湛森
- Simplified Chinese: 黄湛森
Transcriptions
Standard Mandarin
- Hanyu Pinyin: Huáng Zhànsēn
Yue: Cantonese
- Jyutping: Wong4 Jaam3 Sam1

James Wong Jim (Chinese: 黃霑; Jyutping: wong4 zim1; Cantonese Yale: wòhng jīm; 18 March 1941 – 24 November 2004, also known as "霑叔" or "Uncle Jim") was a Cantopop lyricist and songwriter based primarily in Hong Kong. Beginning from the 1960s, he was the lyricist for over 2,000 songs, collaborating with songwriter Joseph Koo (a.k.a. Koo Kar-Fai) on many popular television theme songs, many of which have become classics of the genre. His work propelled Cantopop to unprecedented popularity.

He was also well known in Asia as a columnist, actor, film director, screenwriter, and talk show host. He took part in creative directing positions within the entertainment industry in Hong Kong.

Wong died on 24 November 2004 of lung cancer after a four-year battle at the age of 63.

== Early life and education ==
Wong was born Wong Jum-sum (Chinese: 黃湛森; Jyutping: wong4 zaam3 sam1; Cantonese Yale: wòhng jaam sām) in Panyu, in what now is part of Guangzhou, China. He migrated to Hong Kong with his family in 1949.

He completed his secondary education at La Salle College. In 1963, he graduated from the Chinese Department, Faculty of Arts of the University of Hong Kong. Wong received an MPhil degree from the University of Hong Kong in 1983 for his study in Cantonese opera. In May 2003, in the midst of his fight with lung cancer, he obtained a PhD degree from the Department of Sociology, University of Hong Kong. The title of his thesis was "The Rise and Decline of Cantopop : A Study of Hong Kong Popular Music (1949–1997)".

== Career and contributions ==
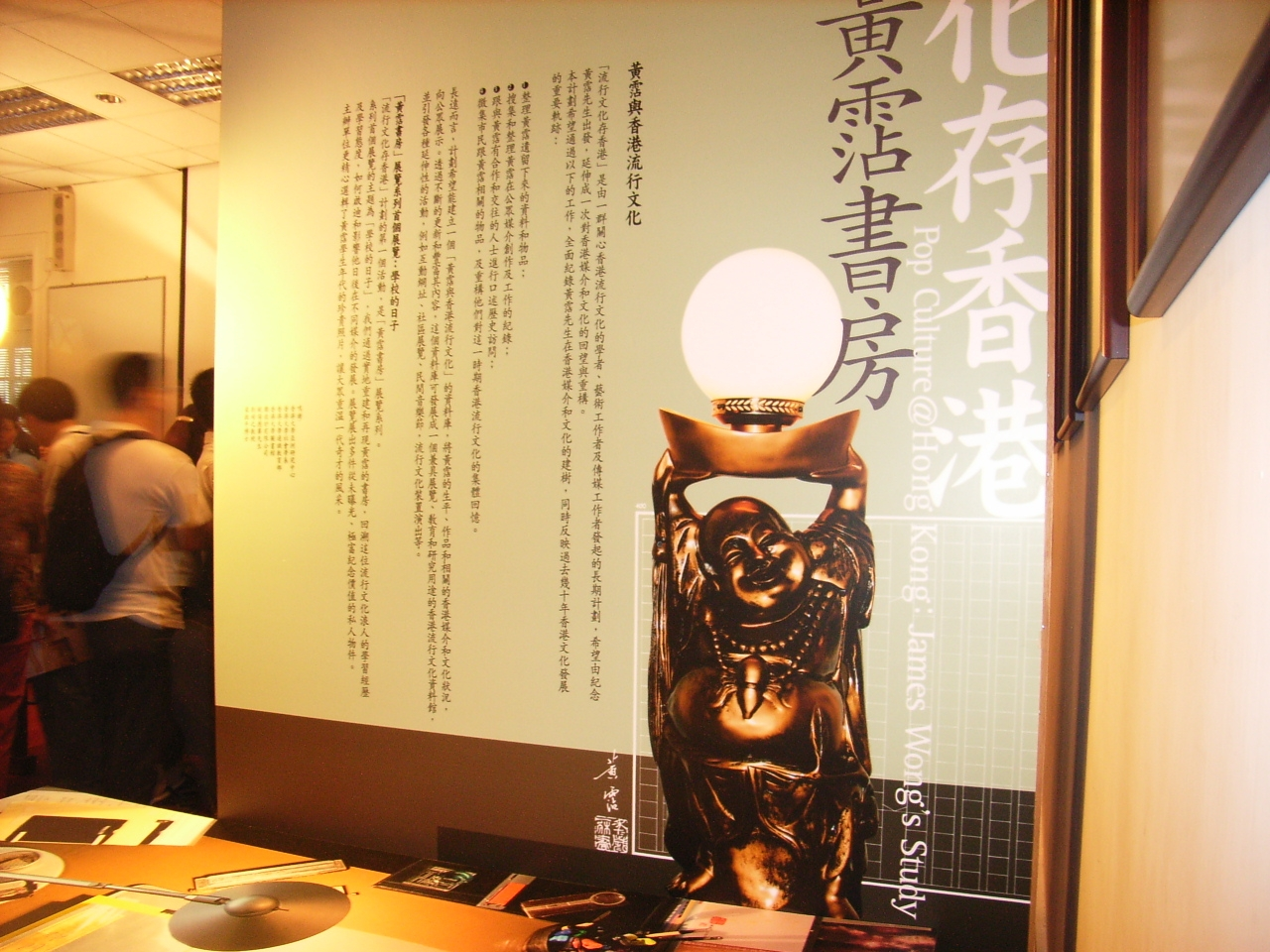
Exhibition of Dr. Wong's works during University of Hong Kong's CAS Openday in October 2005

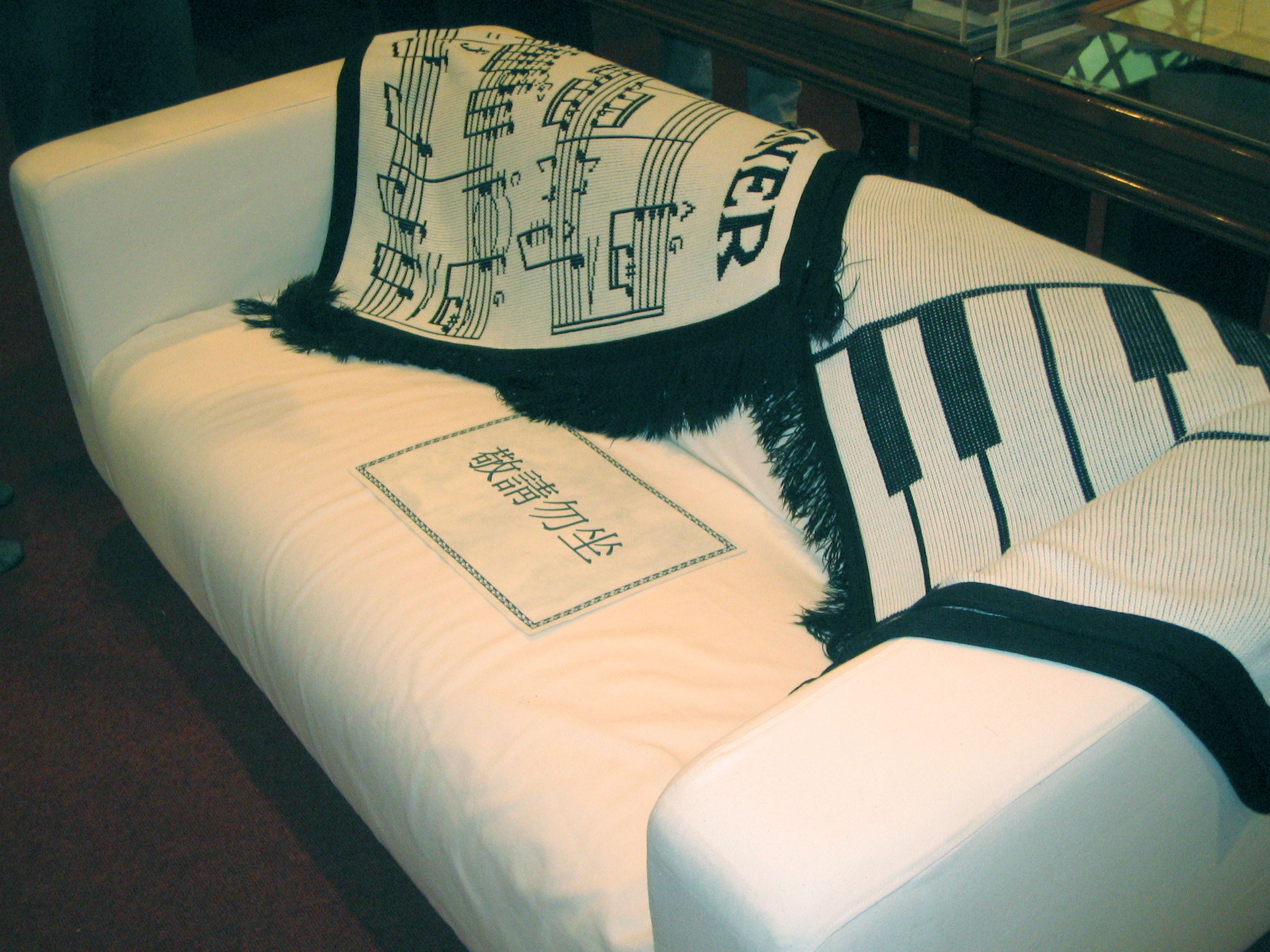
Music Blanket is one of Wong's favourite personal collection

Wong participated in a variety of media fields including advertising, movies and music. Nicknamed a "genius" (Chinese: 鬼才; Jyutping: gwai2 coi4; Cantonese Yale: gwái chòih; lit. 'ghost talent') for his prodigious abilities, he was best known for his achievements as a lyricist of Cantonese songs in Hong Kong. Beginning from the 1960s, he was the lyricist for over 2,000 songs, collaborating with composer Joseph Koo (a.k.a. Gu Gaa-fai) on many popular TVB TV drama theme songs, many of which have become classics of the genre. His works pushed the development of Cantopop to unprecedented popularity.

While well known and praised for his creative works in the entertainment and advertisement fields, Wong was also famous for his vulgar and indelicate jokes. He had a series of best-selling joke books. He was regarded as responsible for breaking the barrier to many cultural taboos in Hong Kong during the conservative environment in the 1970s. He is best remembered as the person who came up with the slogan "Two kids are good enough" for The Family Planning Association of Hong Kong.

Wong hosted several TV programs, mostly interviews or talk shows oriented towards adults, on both TVB and ATV. One of the talk shows called "Off-guard Tonight" (今夜不設防), co-hosted by Wong and his close friends Chua Lam and Ni Kuang on ATV, is particularly remembered. James Wong also famously interviewed Chow Yun-fat and noted that Chow was initially discovered and supported exclusively by Goldig Films and Alex Gouw with generous salaries. But Wong questioned if Chow did honour his contractual obligation with Goldig during TVB and ATV shows leading to a clarification made by Goldig in 2001. Goldig Investment became a property and investment enterprise after the early-1980s.

As a singer, he is a tenor with 2.5 octaves in chest voice due to him being a heavy smoker. Due to his narrow vocal range, he only released one album despite being a keen singer.

In the 1990s, Wong's creative works became less popular, and many entertainment companies featured fewer of Wong's songs. Some TV shows hosted by Wong were also unpopular. Wong decided to return to Hong Kong University to get a doctorate degree in Hong Kong popular culture. His dissertation essay is now in the library of Hong Kong University.

On 24 November 2004, Wong died at the Union Hospital in Hong Kong. His funeral was a low-key family funeral as per his wishes. Hong Kong citizens reflected on his career and accomplishments during this time. In the following days, the news of his death became the primary media headline in Hong Kong, and his compositions were played throughout the week. A remembrance ceremony took place at Hong Kong Stadium, with over 15,000 attending this ceremony.

== Personal life ==
Wong was officially married twice, but had three notable relationships. He had three children with his first wife, singer Wah Wa. Their sons were Wong Yue-hon (黃宇瀚) and Wong Yue-man (黃宇文). Their marriage ended while Hua Wa was pregnant with their only daughter, Ursule Wong (黃宇詩).

Wong once said the most important love of his life was Eunice Lam, a writer whom he lived with from 1976 to 1990, but did not marry. Lam was also a radio host, and was the sister of Richard Lam, a Cantopop lyricist. Lam died from cancer in 2018.

Wong's second marriage was to his long-time assistant, Winnie Chan, until his death, but she was never seen with him in public.

== Important works in lyrics ==
- It's a Small World (世界真細小) Chinese adaptation
- Below the Lion Rock (獅子山下)
- The Bund of Shanghai (上海灘), theme song from TV series The Bund (1980)
- All Kind Sentiments (萬般情), theme song from TV series The Bund II (1980)
- Shanghai Beach of the Dragon Tiger Battle (上海灘龍虎鬥), theme song from TV series The Bund III (1980)
- When I'm Asked (問我)
- Both are forgetten in the mist (兩忘煙水裡)
- Tao (道), theme to the Tsui Hark-produced A Chinese Ghost Story
- A laugh in blue sea (滄海一聲笑), theme to Tsui Hark's The Swordsman
- A Man Should Stand Strong (男兒當自強), theme song to Tsui Hark's Once Upon a Time in China series about Wong Fei Hung; set to the traditional Chinese tune On the General's Orders (將軍令)
- No need to remember old dreams (舊夢不須記)
- Childhood(童年)
- Work Hard (奮鬥)
- The Legend of the Book and Sword (書劍恩仇錄), theme song from TV series The Legend of the Book and Sword (1976)
- Hotel (狂潮), theme song from TV series Hotel (1976)
- The Legend of the Heroic Knights (近代豪俠傳) (1976)
- A House Is Not a Home (家變), theme song from TV series A House Is Not a Home (1977)
- Vanity Fair (大亨), theme song from TV series Vanity Fair (1978)
- The Romantic Swordsman (小李飛刀), theme song from TV series The Romantic Swordsman (1978)
- Heaven Sword and Dragon Sabre (倚天屠龍記), theme song from TV series Heaven Sword and Dragon Sabre (1978)
- The Flaming Ceremonial Fire (熊熊聖火), sub theme song from TV series Heaven Sword and Dragon Sabre (1978)
- The Giants (強人), theme song from TV series The Giants (1978)
- The Oath Must Enter the Mountain of Sword (誓要入刀山), theme song from TV series Luk Siu Fung III (1978)
- Not Sentiments (情未了) (1978)
- Game of Death (死亡遊戲), theme song from the movie Game of Death (1978)
- Over the Rainbow (天虹), theme song from TV series Over the Rainbow (1979)
- The Passenger (抉擇), theme song from TV series The Passenger (1979)
- Chor Lau Heung (楚留香), theme song from TV series Chor Lau Heung (1979)
- The Heroes of Man and Sea (人海奇譚) (1979)
- Wind and Clouds (風雲), theme song from TV series This Land is Mine (1980)
- Leaves Depart From the Tear Hard to Endure (難忍別離淚), theme song from TV series In Search of (1980)
- The Brothers (親情), theme song from TV series The Brothers (1980)
- The Discovery Bay (發現灣), theme song from TV series The Discovery Bay (1980)
- The Invincible Medic (仁者無敵), theme song from TV series The Invincible Medic (1980)
- Five Easy Pieces (輪流傳), theme song from TV series Five Easy Pieces (1980)
- Eunuch (龍仇鳳血), theme song from TV series Eunuch (1980)
- The Adventurer's (衝擊), theme song from TV series The Adventurer's (1980)
- Famous Sword (名劍) (1980)
- Using Love to Steal a Heart (用愛將心偷), theme song from TV series The Shell Game (1980)
- Personhood Loves Freedom (做人愛自由), theme song from TV series The Misadventure of Zoo (1981)
- Cheers (飲勝), sub theme song from TV series The Misadventure of Zoo (1981)
- In Love and War (烽火飛花), theme song from TV series In Love and War (1981)
- Breath and Depths of Mountains and Waters (萬水千山縱橫) (1982)
- Forgets With All One's Heart the Sentiment (忘盡心中情), theme song from TV series The Legend of Master So (1982)
- Heart Debt (心債), theme song from TV series Soldier of Fortune (1982)
- Being at a High Game (胸懷大志), theme song from TV series The Emissary (1982)
- You're the One Who Decides to Love (愛定你一個), theme song from TV series The Radio Tycoon (1983)
- Heroine (巾幗英雄), theme song from TV series The Legend of the Unknowns (1983)
- Hands Over My Heart (交出我的心), theme song from TV series Woman on the Beat (1983)
- Descendants of the Yellow Emperor (黄帝子孫) (1983)
- In Dream Several Sorrow (夢裏幾番哀), theme song from TV series The Foundation (1984)
- I Cannot See My Tears Flow (不見我淚流), sub theme song from TV series The Foundation (1984)
- It Will Be Throughout Lucky (始終會行運), theme song from TV series The Duke of Mount Deer (1984)
- Me and You, He and Me (我與你 他與我), theme song from TV series The Rough Ride (1985)
- The Song of Chu (楚歌), theme song from TV series The Battlefield (1985)
- The Flying Fox of the Snowy Mountains (雪山飛狐), theme song from TV series The Flying Fox of the Snowy Mountains (1985)
- In the Sentimental Past (當年情), theme song from the movie A Better Tomorrow (1986)
- Leaves Behind My Fond Dream (留下我美夢), theme song from TV series The Return of Luk Siu Fung (1986)
- Holds Up the Head to Sing to the Day (昂首向天唱) (1986)
- Will Rush Toward Future Day (奔向未來的日子), theme song from the movie A Better Tomorrow II (1987)
- The Humanity's Mistake (人類的錯), theme song from TV series Born to Be a King (1987)
- Youth Heart (少年心), sub theme song from TV series Born to Be a King (1987)
- Hu Han Dream (胡漢夢), theme song from TV series The Legend of the Book and Sword (1987)
- Heart of Fire (焚心以火) (1990)
- To Die, To A Unique Skill (絕世絕招), theme song from TV series The Legend of the Condor Heroes (1994)
- You Come to My Next Full Moon (圓月下你來依我), sub theme song from TV series Against the Blade of Honour (1994)
- Splendid Story (精彩故事), theme song from TV series Corner the Con Man (1997)
- Has You Rarely (難得有你), theme song from TV series Corner the Con Man (1997)
- Top of the Head, One Piece of the Day (頭頂一片天) (1998)
- The Cool Breeze Does Not Dye (清風不染), theme song from TV series Justice Sung II (1999)
- Beautiful Fate (美麗緣份), theme song from TV series Better-halves (2003)
- The Sentimental Often In (情常在) (2004)

== Awards ==
Wong received numerous awards for his works.

– Music Awards

- 1981 忘記他, The best cantopop, 4th Top Ten Chinese Golden Pop Music, RTHK
- 1982 兩忘煙水里, The best cantopop, 4th Top Ten Chinese Golden Pop Music, RTHK
- 1989 Best Lyricist, 2nd Hong Kong Artist Awards (香港藝術家年獎)
- 1990 Golden Pin, 13th, Top Ten Chinese Golden Pop Music, RTHK
- 1991 Hall of Fame, RTHK (Radio and Television Hong Kong)
- 2000 Hall of Fame Award, CASH (Composers and Authors Society of Hong Kong).
- 2002 Hall of Fame Award for 25th Anniversary, 25th Top Ten Chinese Golden Pop Music, RTHK

– Film Awards

- 1987 倩女幽魂, A Chinese Ghost Story: Best Original Score and Best Film Song ("Lai Ming But Yiu Loi"), 7th Hong Kong Film Awards
- 1990 The Terracotta Warrior: Best Original Film Score; and The Swordsman: Best Original Film Song, 10th Hong Kong Film Awards
- 1991 黃飛鴻, 11th Hong Kong Film Awards
- 1992 黃飛鴻 之II 男兒當自強, 29th Taiwan's Golden Horse Award
- 1994 梁祝, Best Original Film Score, 14th Hong Kong Film Awards

== Filmography as actor ==
- In-Laws, Out-Laws (2004)
- Visible Secret (2001) – Lo Kit
- Funny Business (2000)
- Love Paradox (2000) – Security guard
- Bishonen (1998) – J.P.
- A Chinese Ghost Story: The Tsui Hark Animation (1997) – Red Beard (voice, Cantonese version)
- Screwball '94 (1994) – Tong Shi Yi
- It's a Wonderful Life (1994) – George
- Best of Best (1994)
- I Will Wait for You (1994) – Thief
- Return to a Better Tomorrow (1994) – Wong
- I Have a Date with Spring (1994) – Triad
- Iron Monkey (1993) – Governor Cheng
- Flirting Scholar (1993) – Mr. Wah
- All's Well, Ends Well Too (1993) – Magistrate
- Summer Lovers (1992) – Uncle Wah
- Fight Back to School II (1992) – Minister Wong
- Stooges in Hong Kong (1992)
- Rich Man (1992) – Peter Chow
- Once Upon a Time a Hero in China (1992)
- All's Well, Ends Well (1992)
- The Twin Dragons (1992) – Twins' Father
- Spiritually a Cop (1991)
- The Banquet (1991) – Food Vendor
- Gambling Ghost (1991) – Brother Dragon
- Doctor Vampire (1991)
- Stooges in Tokyo (1991) – Chung, Kwok Shing
- B B 30 (1990)
- The Wild Goose Chase (1990)
- Tiger on the Beat 2 (1990) – Wong
- Miss Asia Pageant 1990 (1990) (TV) – Host
- The Romancing Star III (1989) – Housiu Jim
- Just Heroes (1989) – Solicitor Wong
- Mr. Sunshine (1989)
- Celebrity Talk Show (1989) TV Series – Host
- Happy Ghost 4 (1989) – Judge
- Miss Asia Pageant 1989 (1989) (TV) – Host
- Black Dragon (1989) – Mr. Ku's Friend
- City Squeeze (1989)
- The Crazy Companies (1988) – Priest
- Fractured Follies (1988) – May's father, a supermarket owner
- Tiger on Beat (1988) – Police Inspector Jim Pak
- Mother vs. Mother (1988) – Substitute Minister
- Double Fattiness (1988) – Orchestra Director
- Red Headed Stranger (1986) – Chinese Laborer
- Musical Dancer (1985) – James Wong
- My Darling, My Goddess (1982) – Randy Jim
- Chinatown Kid (1977) – Gambler
- Let's Rock (1975)
- Games Gamblers Play (1974)

== See also ==
- List of graduates of University of Hong Kong

Awards
Preceded by Paula Tsui	Golden Needle Award of RTHK Top Ten Chinese Gold Songs Award; 1990	Succeeded by Roman Tam
