= Five Easy Pieces (TV series) =

Hong Kong television series

- Opening theme: "輪流傳" (Five Easy Pieces) by Adam Cheng
- Composer: Joseph Koo
- Country of origin: Hong Kong
- Original language: Cantonese
- No. of episodes: 30 (originally proposed for 80)

Production
- Running time: 45 minutes (30 episodes)

Original release
- Network: TVB

Five Easy Pieces (輪流傳) is a TVB television series, premiered on 4 August 1980. Theme song "Five Easy Pieces" (輪流傳) composition and arrangement by Joseph Koo, lyricist by Wong Jim, sung by Adam Cheng.
