= Cantopop =

Genre of Cantonese popular music

- Native name: 廣東流行音樂
- Stylistic origins: Cantonese Opera; Music of Guangdong; jazz; classical music; traditional pop; film score; rock and roll; rock; R&B; soul; tropical music; disco; folk; electronic; Synth-Pop; New Wave; Adult Contemporary; Soft Rock; Easy Listening; Christmas carol; ballad
- Cultural origins: 1970s Hong Kong

Other topics
- C-pop; J-pop; K-pop; Mandopop; Shidaiqu

Cantopop
- Traditional Chinese: 粵語流行音樂
- Simplified Chinese: 粤语流行音乐
Transcriptions
Standard Mandarin
- Hanyu Pinyin: Yuèyǔ liúxíng yīnyuè
- Bopomofo: ㄩㄝˋ ㄩˇ ㄌㄧㄡˊ ㄒㄧㄥˊ ㄧㄣ ㄩㄝˋ
- Wade–Giles: Yüeh^{4}-yü^{3} liu^{2}-hsing^{2} yin^{1}-yüeh^{4}
- Tongyong Pinyin: Yuè-yǔ lióu-síng yin-yuè
- IPA: [ɥê.ỳ ljǒʊ.ɕǐŋ ín.ɥê]
Yue: Cantonese
- Yale Romanization: Yuht yúh làuh hàhng yām ngohk
- Jyutping: jyut6 jyu5 lau4 hang4 jam1 ngok6
- IPA: [jyt̚˨ jy˩˧ lɐw˩ hɐŋ˩ jɐm˥ ŋɔk̚˨]

Cantopop (a contraction of "Cantonese pop music") is a genre of pop music sung in Cantonese. Cantopop is also used to refer to the cultural context of its production and consumption. The genre began in the 1970s and became associated with Hong Kong popular music from the middle of the decade. Cantopop then reached its height of popularity in the 1980s and 1990s before slowly declining in the 2000s and shrinking in the 2010s. The term "Cantopop" itself was coined in 1978 after "Cantorock", a term first used in 1974. In the 1980s, Cantopop peaked with a fanbase and concerts all over the world, especially in Macau, Mainland China, Taiwan, Singapore, Malaysia, South Korea, and Japan. This was even more obvious with the influx of songs from Hong Kong movies during the time.

Besides Western pop music, Cantopop is also influenced by other international genres, including jazz, rock and roll, R&B, disco, electronic, ballad and others. Cantopop songs are almost invariably performed in Cantonese. Boasting a multi-national fanbase, the genre has gained popularity in countries such as Vietnam, Thailand, Singapore, Malaysia, and Indonesia. Additionally, it has found following in South Korea, Japan, Taiwan, and the provinces of Guangdong and Guangxi in southeastern mainland China. Hong Kong remains as the significant hub of the genre.

== History ==
=== 1920s to 1950s: Shanghai origins ===
Western-influenced music first came to China in the 1920s, specifically through Shanghai. Artists like Zhou Xuan (周璇) acted in films and recorded popular songs.

After the People's Republic of China was founded by the Chinese Communist Party in 1949, the new government quickly denounced pop music—particularly Western pop—as decadent. Beginning in the 1950s, massive waves of immigrants fled Shanghai to destinations like North Point in Hong Kong. As a result, many first generation Cantopop artists and composers hail from Shanghai.

=== 1960s: Cultural acceptance ===
By the 1960s, Cantonese music in Hong Kong was still limited largely to traditional Cantonese opera and comic renditions of western music. Tang Kee-chan, Cheng Kuan-min (鄭君綿), and Tam Ping-man (譚炳文) were among the earliest artists releasing Cantonese records.

The generation at the time preferred British and American exports. Western culture was at the time equated with education and sophistication, and Elvis Presley, Johnny Mathis and The Beatles were popular.

Conversely, those who preferred Cantonese music were considered old-fashioned or uneducated. Cheng Kum-cheung and Chan Chai-chung (陳齊頌) were two popular Cantonese singers who specifically targeted the younger generation. Connie Chan Po-chu is generally considered to be Hong Kong's first teen idol, mostly due to her career longevity. Josephine Siao is also another artist of the era.

=== 1970s: Beginning of the Golden Age (Rise of television and the modern industry) ===
Local bands mimicked British and American bands. Two types of local Cantonese music appeared in the market nearly concurrently in 1973: one type cashed in on the popularity of TVB's drama series based on the more traditional lyrical styles. The other was more western style music largely from Polydor Hong Kong (寶麗多唱片). Notable singers from the era include Liza Wang and Paula Tsui. At the same time, television was fast becoming a household must-have that offered free entertainment to the public. For example, The Fatal Irony (啼笑因緣) and Games Gamblers Play (鬼馬雙星) took the local music scene by storm as soon as they were broadcast on the radio and television.

Soap operas were needed to fill TV air time, and popular Cantonese songs became TV theme songs. Around 1971, Sandra Lang, a minor singer who had never sung Cantopop before, was invited to sing a Cantonese TV theme song "A marriage of Laughter and Tears" (啼笑因緣). This song was a collaboration between songwriters Yip Siu-dak (葉紹德) and the legendary Joseph Koo. It was ground-breaking and topped local charts. Other groups that profited from TV promotion included the Four Golden Flowers.

Sam Hui is regarded by some to be the earliest Cantopop star. He was the lead singer of the band Lotus formed in the late 1960s, signed to Polydor in 1972. The song that made him famous was the theme song to Games Gamblers Play (鬼馬雙星), also starring Hui.

The star of TV theme tunes was Roman Tam. Three of the most famous TV soap opera singers were Jenny Tseng, Liza Wang and Adam Cheng. The Wynners and George Lam also amassed a big fan base with their new style. Samuel Hui continued to dominate the charts and won the Centennial Best Sales Award in the first and second IFPI Gold Disc Presentations twice in a row in 1977 and 1978. Polydor became PolyGram (寶麗金) in 1978.

It was at this time that the term Cantopop was first coined. The Billboard correspondent Hans Ebert, who had earlier coined the term Cantorock in 1974, noted a change in its style to something similar to British-American soft rock, therefore started to use the term Cantopop instead in 1978.

In 1974, as the theme song of The Fatal Irony (啼笑因緣) was very successful, TVB sold to the mainland and other countries and Cantopop reached overseas audiences through drama series.

=== 1980s: The Golden Age of Cantopop ===
During the 1980s, Cantopop soared to great heights with artists, producers and record companies working in harmony. Cantopop stars such as Alan Tam, Leslie Cheung, Anita Mui, Sally Yeh, Priscilla Chan, Sandy Lam, Danny Chan, Jacky Cheung, Andy Lau quickly became household names. The industry used Cantopop songs in TV dramas and movies, with some of the biggest soundtracks coming from films such as A Better Tomorrow (英雄本色). Sponsors and record companies became comfortable with the idea of lucrative contracts and million-dollar signings. There were also Japanese songs with Cantonese lyrics.

The "Queen of Mandarin songs" Teresa Teng also crossed over to Cantopop. She achieved commercial success with her original Cantonese Hits under the Polygram Label in the early 1980s. Jenny Tseng was another notable singers, who was born in Macau.

In the 1980s, there came the second wave of "band fever" (the first wave came in the 1960–70s, which was much influenced by the global Beatlemania at that time. Young people thought that forming bands was fashionable. Many new bands emerged at that time, such as Samuel Hui's Lotus, The Wynners, and the Teddy Robin and the Playboys. However, the bands emerged in this first wave were just copying the western music style, mostly covering British and American rock songs, and prefer singing in English rather than Cantonese). Different from the first wave in the 60s, the "band fever" in the 80s did not show an obvious relationship with the global culture at the time being, but much related with the marketing strategy of the local record companies and mass media. Many independent bands and music groups were signed by big record companies, and this made a positive impact to the Hong Kong pop music world, as their works were highly original, with strong individuality, and they were all devoted to writing songs in local language, i.e. Cantonese. The subjects of their works were different from the mainstream (which was mostly love ballads). Politics and social life were popular subjects for the bands in their creation. The "band fever" also brought variety in musical style to the Hong Kong mainstream music world (which was almost monopolised by Pop-ballad for a long time). Styles like Rock, Metal, Pop-Rock, Folk, Neo-Romantic, Pop and some experimental styles (e.g. Cantorock) were introduced. Among them, Beyond and Tat Ming Pair (達明一派) gave the greatest impact to the Hong Kong music world. Some renowned bands and groups included: Beyond, Raidas, Tat Ming Pair, Tai Chi (太極樂隊), Grasshopper (草蜢), Little Tigers (小虎隊), Paradox (夢劇院), Blue Jeans (藍戰士), Echo, Wind & Cloud (風雲樂隊), Citybeat (城市節拍).

The second wave of "band fever" also brought a group of new music lovers to the Hong Kong mainstream music world. Most of them were the just-grew-up generation, or the music lovers of the western Avant-garde music, also the Euro-American Rock-band lovers. This contributed to a great change in the population and age distribution of the music listeners from the 70s. Record companies were laying ever more stress on the buying power of these young new customers. The second wave of "band fever" emerged from the mid-1980s (around 1984) and reached its climax in 1986–87. However the "band fever" cannot put for a long time. Along with the death of the legendary Wong Ka Kui, the leader and co-founder of Beyond, in 1993, and the disband-tide emerged in the early 90s (Tat Ming Pair disbanded in 1990), the "band fever" gradually faded away and totally got down in the early 1990s.

As Cantopop gained large followings in Chinese communities worldwide, Hong Kong entrepreneurs' ingenious use of the then new Laserdisc technology prompted yet another explosion in the market.

=== 1990s: Four Heavenly Kings era ===
In the 1990s in Hong Kong, the "Four Heavenly Kings" — Jacky Cheung, Andy Lau, Leon Lai and Aaron Kwok — dominated pop music, and coverage in magazines, TV, advertisements and cinema. They had wide audience across different regions, including Hong Kong, Taiwan, mainland China, Southeast Asia, and even South Korea. The female counterparts in this era were Sandy Lam, Sammi Cheng, Cass Phang, and Kelly Chen.

In 2019, Andy Lau spoke of his desire for a reunion of the Four Heavenly Kings in an interview with the press.

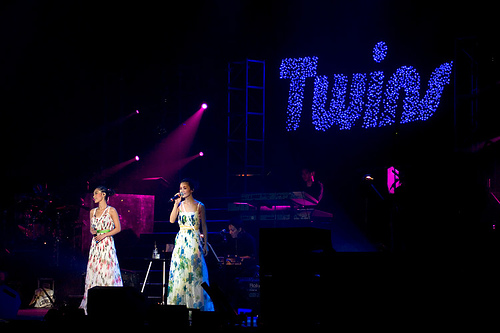
Twins at the height of the group's popularity

=== 2000s: New era ===
At the turn of the century, Cantonese was still dominant in the domain of Chinese pop. The deaths of superstars Leslie Cheung and Anita Mui in 2003 rocked the industry. In addition, with the Four Heavenly Kings fading out and the rise of Taiwan Mandopop singer-songwriter superstars like Leehom Wang, David Tao, Jay Chou and Singapore singer JJ Lin, influence of Cantopop started declining with fans turning to Taiwan Mandopop in the 2000s.

During the period, a transitional phase also took place with many overseas-raised or overseas-educated artists such as Nicholas Tse and Eason Chan gaining popularity and recognition. In 2006, Time magazine praised Eason Chan's Cantonese album U87 as one of the "Five Asian Albums Worth Buying". Besides holding the record for winning the "Ultimate Male Singer - Gold" award (10 times) and "My Favorite Male Singer" award (9 conservative years) at the "Ultimate Song Chart Awards Presentation" in HK, Eason Chan also won numerous awards at major music award ceremonies locally and in other regions. He became one of the representative figures of Cantopop in the 2000s. Cantopop was not restricted only to Hong Kong, but became part of a larger music movement.

In 2005, Cantopop began a new upswing. Major companies that drove much of the HK segment included Gold Typhoon Music Entertainment (EMI, Gold Label), Universal Music Group, East Asia Entertainment (東亞娛樂) and Amusic and Emperor Entertainment Group.

The decade was also dubbed a "People's singer" era (親民歌星), as most performers were frequently seen promoting publicly, in contrast with the 1990s when that era's "big-name" singers (大牌歌星) seemed unapproachable.

A number of scandals struck some of stars later in the decade. In 2008, the Edison Chen photo scandal, involving Edison Chen and Twins singer Gillian Chung among others, was the subject of explicit photos uploaded online. The scandal occupied the front pages of the local press for a solid month, and also garnered the attention of international media. The scandal tarnished the image of the previously "squeaky-clean" Twins, and resulted in their going into hiatus in late June 2008, four months after Gillian was caught up in the scandal. Other events include the street fight between Gary Chaw and Justin Lo. In 2009, Jill Vidal and her singer boyfriend Kelvin Kwan were arrested in Tokyo on 24 February 2009 over allegations of marijuana possession. Kwan was released without charge after 32 days in jail, while Vidal later pleaded guilty in Tokyo court to heroin possession, and was sentenced to two years' imprisonment, suspended for three years.

=== 2010s: Decline ===
In the 2010s, Cantopop market shrank with fans, particularly the youth, turning to K-pop and Mandopop.

As Mandarin became more important as a result of fast growing culturally and economically in China, the influence of Cantonese began to dwindle. Nevertheless, in addition to the 7 million people of Hong Kong and Macau, the genre continues to enjoy popularity among a Cantonese-speaking audience of in excess of 100 million in southern China, plus 10 million Cantonese-speaking diaspora in Canada, Australia and the United States. In 2010, a proposal that Guangzhou Television station should increase its broadcast in Mandarin led to protests in Guangzhou. While the authorities relented, this event reflects an attempt at marginalising Cantonese with the ascendency of Mandopop.

In the 2010s, Cantopop industry had singers and musicians who achieved success beyond the local market and made a mark in the Chinese music scene. Eason Chan is a popular and influential Cantopop superstars. He captures audience across different regions, including Hong Kong, Taiwan, mainland China, Southeast Asia, UK, North America, Australia etc. He successfully held world tours in these regions in the 2010s. He was the first Chinese/HK singer who held solo concerts in London's O2 Arena and Beijing's National Stadium (Bird's Nest).

In the 2010s, there was revival for boy groups and bands in Cantopop with the rise of C AllStar, RubberBand, Supper Moment and Dear Jane.

In 2018, Eason Chan released an album "L.O.V.E." (mainly in Cantonese), which was successful in Taiwan's 30th Golden Melody Awards, winning nominations to three major awards: Song of the Year, Album of the Year, and Producer of the Year, Album. Ultimately, the album's producer, Carl Wong, won the "Producer of the Year, Album" award. This was the first time in the history of the Golden Melody Awards that a Cantonese album won this award.

=== 2020s: Resurgence of Idols ===
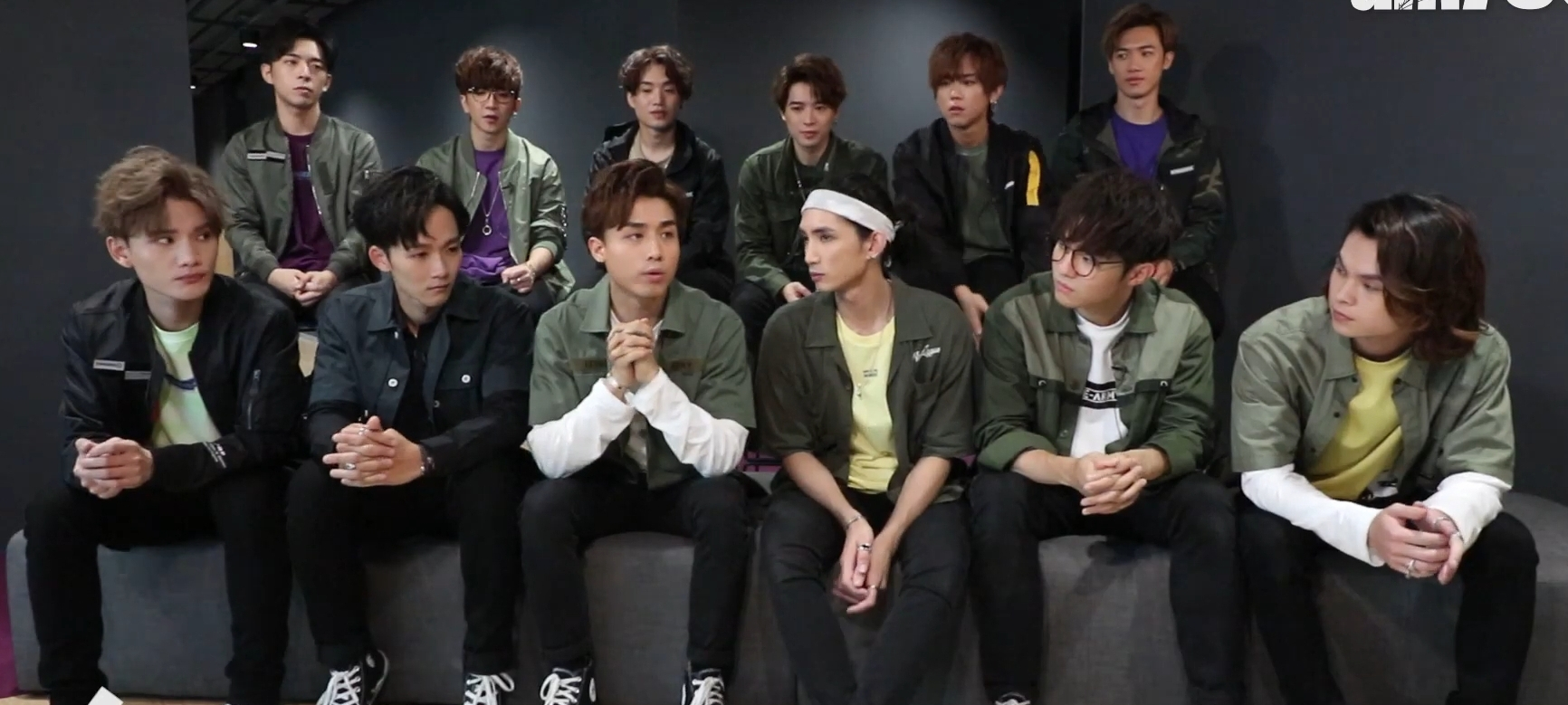
Mirror in 2020

Interest in Cantopop was renewed in the early 2020s in part due to the COVID-19 pandemic in Hong Kong, which led to border closures and restriction of travel. In addition to the 2019–2020 Hong Kong protests and the passing of the Hong Kong national security law in June 2020, the resurgence of Hong Kong pride had led many Cantonese natives to support local music artists. The Cantopop boy group Mirror, which was formed through the ViuTV singing competition in Good Night Show - King Maker in 2018, skyrocketed in popularity during this time due to their distinctively local image. Media had described them as a "Mirror phenomenon."

In February 2021, Hong Kong's biggest television broadcaster, TVB, historically lifted its ban on four of Hong Kong's biggest record labels, opening the doors for non-TVB artists to perform on the network. The move was described by local media as "reviving the Cantopop music industry."

In 2023, Eason Chan released a new album titled "Chin Up!", which included a Cantonese song "Homo Sapiens" (人啊人) with lyrics written by Chow Yiu-fai. This song won Chow the Best Lyricist award at Taiwan's 34th Golden Melody Awards, marking the first time in the history of the awards show that a Cantonese song was nominated and won the award.

In 2024, at the age of 79, the renowned Temple Street King, Wan Kwong (尹光), was voted to the final five of the "My Favorite Male Singer" category at the "Ultimate Song Chart Awards Presentation," marking a record in the Cantopop industry. This was also the first time in over fifty years after his debut that he transitioned from performing at Temple Street to appearing at a major music awards ceremony. The "Wan Kwong phenomenon" caused a stir online, with fans appraising his continuous efforts in releasing his latest song, "Dear Myself," which incorporated AI elements while others voting for him as a counterbalance to the idol genre because they had been sick of Mirror individual members’ live performances and Mirror fans' behavior in the poll.

== Characteristics ==
=== Instruments and setups ===
Early Cantopop was developed from Cantonese opera music hybridised with Western pop. The musicians soon gave up traditional Chinese musical instruments like zheng and Erhu fiddle in favour of western style arrangements. Cantopop songs are usually sung by one singer, sometimes with a band, accompanied by piano, synthesizer, drum set and guitars. They are composed under verse-chorus form and are generally monophonic. Practically all early Cantopop songs feature a descending bassline.

=== Lyrics ===
Cantonese is a pitch sensitive tonal language. The word carries a different meaning when sung in a different relative pitch. Matching Cantonese lyrics to Western music was particularly difficult because the Western musical scale has 12 semitones. Through the work of pioneers like Samuel Hui, James Wong (黃霑) and Jimmy Lo Kwok Tsim (盧國沾), those that followed have more stock phrases for reference. Famous lyricists also include Albert Leung (林夕) and Wyman Wong (黃偉文).

Tonal constraints have been blamed for the decline of Cantopop in the late 1990s, for source of creativity being "mined out". Its ramification includes interpretive constraint, where singers have less room for ad-lib change of pitch without sacrificing intelligibility. As a result, pitch change often encountered in western pop music becomes foreign to most of Hong Kong's singers.

==== Classical Chinese lyrics ====
The first type is the poetic lyrics written in literary or classical Chinese (文言). In the past, Cantopop maintained the Cantonese Opera tradition of matching the musical notes with tones of the language. Relatively few Cantopop songs use truly colloquial Cantonese terms, and fewer songs contain lyrics. Songs written in this style are usually reserved for TV shows about ancient China. Since the 1980s, increasing numbers of singers have departed from this tradition, though some big names like Roman Tam stayed true to traditional techniques.

==== Modern Chinese lyrics ====
The second type is less formal. The lyrics written in colloquial Cantonese make up the majority with compositions done in modern written Chinese. TV shows filmed under modern contexts will use songs written with these lyrics. Most songs share an over-riding characteristic, in which every last word of a phrase is rhymed.

The following is an example from the song "Impression" (印象) by Samuel Hui. The last word of every phrase ends with '–oeng'.

Chinese original lyrics	Lyrics Romanized in Jyutping
1. 誰令我當晚舉止失常; 2. 難自禁望君你能見諒; 3. 但覺萬分緊張 皆因跟你遇上; 4. 誰令我突然充滿幻想	1. seoi4 ling6 ngo5 dong1 maan5 geoi2 zi2 sat1 soeng4 2. naan4 zi6 gam1 mong6 gwan1 nei5 nang4 gin3 loeng6 3. daan6 gok3 maan6 fan1 gan2 zoeng1 gaai1 jan1 gan1 nei5 jyu6 soeng5 4. seoi4 ling6 ngo5 dat6 jin4 cung1 mun5 waan6 soeng2

=== Covers of foreign compositions ===
Cantopop was born in the 1970s and became a cultural product with the popularity of two popular TVB drama's themes songs in the early 1970s: "Tower Ballad" (鐵塔凌雲, 1972) and "A marriage of Laughter and Tears" (啼笑因緣, 1974). The majority of "hit" Cantopop, however, is not entirely local produced but the cover versions of "hit" foreign melodies. Since the 1970s, covering "hit" external songs mainly from Japan, Korea, Taiwan or other Western countries became a common practice among Hong Kong record companies. At that time, Hong Kong's constantly growing music industry acknowledges simply by using those hits, whose already gained popularity, will be the easiest way to reach success in the market. Cover versions were also widely used as a solution to address the shortage of the local hits due to the lack of local composers. Another reason for the use of cover versions is to minimise the production costs. The practice is also done for business reasons of filling up albums and re-capitalizing on songs with a proven record.

The Radio Television Hong Kong (RTHK) Top Ten Chinese Gold Songs Awards, which is one of the major music awards in Hong Kong since 1979, can reflect the great reliance on Japanese melodies in Cantopop. During the 1980s, 139 out of 477 songs from weekly gold songs chart were cover versions, and 52% of the cover versions were covers of Japanese songs. Numerous legendary songs of Cantopop superstars Alan Tam, Leslie Cheung and Anita Mui, for example "Craziness" (1983), "Monica" (1984), "Foggy Love" (1984), "For Your Love Only" (1985), "Evil Girl" (1985), "The Past Love" (1986), "The First Tear" (1986), and "Fired Tango", were cover versions of Japanese hits, showing that covers contributed to the success of superstars to a certain degree.

By definition hybrids are still considered Cantonese songs due to the Cantonese lyrics, though the rights borrowed varies country to country. Songs like "Tomorrow sounds like today" (明日話今天) by Jenny Tseng, "Life to seek" (一生何求) by Danny Chan, "Snowing" (飄雪) by Priscilla Chan, and "Can't afford" (負擔不起) by Jade Kwan were originally composed outside of Hong Kong. Many critics disapprove of the practice of covering foreign music and consider it lacking in originality, and many albums promoted themselves as "cover-free".

== Canto-jazz ==
On January 29, 2010, Jacky Cheung released his Private Corner album coining the phrase "Canto-jazz", to describe the concept of the album and the musical style of the songs.

In The South China Morning Post, Rachel Mok described "Canto-jazz" as a "unique fusion of the two music styles" of "light jazz" and canto-pop creating a fresh sound with a uniquely local flavour". She cited Jacky Cheung's Private Corner and Karen Mok's "Somewhere I Belong" among artists who have recorded Cantonese language albums in the new jazz genre coined "canto-jazz".

An educational study traced the development of jazz in Greater China and explored the cross-cultural issues in rearranging a cantopop song for big band or jazz combo arrangement.

== Industry ==
=== Cantopop stars ===
Talent is unusually secondary to the success of a Cantopop singer in Hong Kong. Most times, image sells albums, as it is one of the characteristics of mainstream music similarly mirrored in the United States and Japan. Publicity is vital to an idol's career, as one piece of news could make or break a future. Almost all modern Cantopop stars go into the movie business regardless of their ability to act; however, the reverse may also occur with actors releasing albums and embarking on concerts regardless of singing talent. They immediately expand to the Mandarin market once their fame is established, hence pure Cantopop stars are almost nonexistent. Outside of music sales, their success can also be gauged by their income. For example, according to some reports, Sammi Cheng earned HK$46M (around US$6M) from advertisement and merchandise endorsements in one month alone. Many artists, however, begin with financial hardships. For example, Yumiko Cheng owed her company thousands of dollars. Others include Elanne Kong crying in public with only HK$58 left.

Cantopop superstars include 70s: Sam Hui, Paula Tsui, Roman Tam, Frances Yip; 80s: Alan Tam, Leslie Cheung, Anita Mui, Beyond; 90s: Jacky Cheung, Leon Lai, Andy Lau, Aaron Kwok, Sammi Cheng, Cass Phang, Kelly Chen; 00s-10s: Eason Chan, Joey Yung, Miriam Yeung, Leo Ku. They successfully held world concert tours, e.g. Jacky in New York 's MSG, Faye in Tokyo's Nippon Budokan, Eason in London's O2 Arena and Beijing's National Stadium (Bird's Nest).

=== Labels ===
PolyGram, EMI, Sony, Warner and BMG were established in Hong Kong since the 1970s. Local record companies such as Crown Records (娛樂唱片), Wing Hang Records (永恆), Manchi Records (文志) and Capital Artists (華星唱片) in the past have become successful local labels. As TV drama themes lost favour in the mid-1980s, market power soon drifted to the multi-national labels. Sales are tracked at the IFPI HK Annual Sales Chart.

== Major awards ==
Award	Organiser	Year started	Final year	Origin
Wah Kiu Man Po Gold Camel Award for Top Ten Singers	Wah Kiu Man Po	1970	1981	Hong Kong
Wah Kiu Man Po Gold Camel Award for Top Ten Singers	National Lacquer and Paint Products Company (國民漆廠)	1970	1981	Hong Kong
IFPI Hong Kong Top Sales Award	IFPI (Hong Kong)	1977	2017	Hong Kong
RTHK Top 10 Gold Songs Awards	RTHK	1978	till present	Hong Kong
Jade Solid Gold Top 10 Awards	TVB	1983	till present	Hong Kong
Ultimate Song Chart Awards	Commercial Radio Hong Kong	1988	till present	Hong Kong
Metro Radio Music Awards	Metro Broadcast Corporation	1994	till present	Hong Kong
Four Stations Joint Music Awards	RTHK	1995	2010	Hong Kong
Four Stations Joint Music Awards	Commercial Radio Hong Kong	1995	2010	Hong Kong
Four Stations Joint Music Awards	Metro Broadcast Corporation	1995	2010	Hong Kong
Four Stations Joint Music Awards	TVB	1995	2010	Hong Kong
CASH Golden Sail Music Awards	Composers and Authors Society of Hong Kong	2001	till present	Hong Kong
KKBOX Hong Kong Music Awards	KKBOX	2019	till present	Hong Kong
Chill Club Awards	ViuTV	2021	till present	Hong Kong
Hong Kong Gold Songs Award Presentation Ceremony	RTHK	2022	2022	Hong Kong
Hong Kong Gold Songs Award Presentation Ceremony	TVB	2022	2022	

A record chart which includes all genres of C-pop is the Global Chinese Pop Chart.

== Cantopop radio stations ==
Station	Location	Frequencies and Platform
CRHK Radio 2	Hong Kong	90.3 FM Available on my903.com and their other channel 88.1 during non-talk shows happen.
RTHK Radio 2	Hong Kong	94.8 FM, 95.3 FM, 95.6 FM, 96.0 FM, 96.3 FM, 96.4 FM, 96.9 FM, and Internet live streaming (channel 2)
Chinese Radio New York	New York	1480AM
KEST	San Francisco	1450 AM
KMRB	Los Angeles	1430 AM
KVTO	San Francisco	1400 AM
CHMB	Vancouver	1320 AM
Fairchild Radio	Vancouver	1470 AM, 96.1 FM
Fairchild Radio	Toronto	1430 AM, 88.9 FM
Fairchild Radio	Calgary	94.7 FM
Music FM Radio Guangdong	Guangdong	93.9 FM, 99.3 FM and internet stream media
SYN FM	Melbourne	90.7 FM – Cantopop show as part of Asian Pop Night.
2AC 澳洲華人電台	Sydney	(proprietary receivers)
2CR	Sydney Melbourne	(proprietary receivers)

== See also ==
- Music of Hong Kong
- Hong Kong musical tongue twister
- Hong Kong English pop
- Hong Kong television drama
- C-pop
- Hokkien pop
- Mandopop
- Chinese hip hop
- Taiwanese hip hop
- J-pop
- K-pop
- V-pop
