= The Legend of Master So =

- DVD cover
- Genre: Martial arts
- Starring: Chow Yun-fat; Andy Lau; Michael Miu; Michelle Yim
- Opening theme: "忘盡心中情" (Forgets all of One's Heart Sentiment) by Johnny Yip
- Composer: Joseph Koo
- Country of origin: Hong Kong
- Original language: Cantonese
- No. of episodes: 20

Production
- Running time: 45 minutes (20 episodes)

Original release
- Network: TVB
- Release: 27 September – 22 October 1982

The Legend of Master So (蘇乞兒) is a TVB television series, premiered on 27 September 1982. Theme song "Forgets With All One's Heart the Sentiment" (忘盡心中情) composition and arrangement by Joseph Koo, lyricist by Wong Jim, sung by Johnny Yip.

== Short plot Summary ==
this TV series set in the 1920s during kuomintang era so chan whom live in the 20th century.

== Cast ==
- Chow Yun-fat as So Chan (蘇燦)
- Andy Lau as Man Tit Ho (萬鐵豪)
- Michael Miu as Ma Kwan (馬坤)
- Michelle Yim as Siu Ling (蕭玲)
