= The Passenger (Hong Kong TV series) =

Hong Kong television series

- Opening theme: "抉擇" (The Passenger) by George Lam
- Composer: Joseph Koo
- Country of origin: Hong Kong
- Original language: Cantonese
- No. of episodes: 90

Production
- Producer: Gary Chow
- Running time: 45 minutes (90 episodes)

Original release
- Network: TVB

The Passenger (抉擇) is a Hong Kong television series on TVB that premiered on May 28, 1979. Theme song "The Passenger" (抉擇) composition and arrangement by Joseph Koo, lyricist by Wong Jim, sung by George Lam.
