= The Emissary (TV series) =

Hong Kong television series

- VCD cover
- 獵鷹
- Genre: Crime drama
- Written by: Tsang Suk Kuen; Kwan Chin-pok; Lo Hon-wah; Chan Lin-sum
- Directed by: Lee Tim-shing; Siu Kin-kam; Yip Sing-hong; Lau Tin-fu; Leung Choi-yuen
- Starring: Andy Lau; Deanie Ip; Babara Chan; Lau Kong; Tony Leung
- Opening theme: Being at a High Game (胸懷大志) by Willie Fung
- Composer: Joseph Koo
- Country of origin: Hong Kong
- Original language: Cantonese
- No. of episodes: 20

Production
- Producer: Lee Tim-shing
- Production location: Hong Kong
- Running time: 45 minutes (20 episodes)
- Production company: TVB

Original release
- Network: TVB Jade
- Release: 27 December 1982 – 21 January 1983

The Emissary
- Traditional Chinese: 獵鷹
- Simplified Chinese: 猎鹰
- Literal meaning: "Falcon"
Transcriptions
Standard Mandarin
- Hanyu Pinyin: Liè Yīng
Yue: Cantonese
- Jyutping: Lip6 Jing1

The Emissary (獵鷹) is a 1982 Hong Kong crime drama television series produced by TVB and starring Andy Lau in his first television leading role, shooting him to instant fame. Since then, Lau's acting career began to take on a broad road. The series' theme song, titled Being at a High Game (胸懷大志), was composed and arranged by Joseph Koo, with lyrics written by Wong Jim, and was sung by Willie Fung.

== Plot ==
Kong Tai-wai (Andy Lau) is an idealistic college student who decides to join the police force, and later becomes an undercover detective disguising himself as a chief assistant of a major drug trafficker. After a long period of hard work, Kong collected large amount of incriminating against the drug trafficker, finally completing his mission and bringing the trafficker to justice.

== Cast ==
- Andy Lau as Kong Tai-wai (江大偉)
- Barbara Chan as Wong Ka-kei (王嘉琦)
- Lau Kong as Chik Kon (戚幹)
- Deanie Ip as Kong Ha (江霞)
- Paul Chun as Lau Chun-tong (劉振棠)
- Lau Siu Ming as Luk Yat-fan (陸一帆)
- Regina Tsang as Hong Wah (康華)
- Tony Leung Chiu-Wai as Wong Man-sing (王文昇)
- Benz Hui as Chui Fuk (崔福)
- Susanna Kwan as Wendy / Thirteen Sister (十三妹)
- Joseph Lee as Yau Kwok-kei (游國基)
- Kent Cheng as Fat Chan (肥陳)
- Andy Tai as CID
- Chiu Hung as Chan Sui (陳水)
- Law Kwok-hung as Chow Cheung-wong (周祥旺)
- Amy Wu as Ci Ci
- Chan On-ying as Wong Ka-wai (王嘉慧)
- Wong Chung-chi as Wong Man-chun (王文俊)
- Tam Chuen-hing as Inspector Lee (李幫辦)
- Mak Fei-fei as Kwan (君)
- Leung Hung-wah as Chiu (昭)
- Tsang Wai-ming as Ping (炳)
- Cho Chai as Piu (彪)
- Bak Man-biu as Crazy Man (癲佬)
- Ng Yip-kwong as Kwok Sir (郭Sir)
- Chan Yau-hau as Mr. Tong (唐先生)
- Leung Oi as Mrs. Tong (唐太)
- Shek Siu-lun as Tan-ka Man (旦家文)
- Cheng Siu-ming as Mrs. Wong (王師奶)
- Tsui Kwong-lam as Cheung Kam (張錦)
- Liu Chun-hung as Ngau (牛)
- Henry Lo as Au (歐)
- Lee Kin-chuen as Leung (梁)
- Tsang Yuk-ha as Linda
- Tsang Cho-lam as Toilet Chung (屎坑松)
- Wong So-mei as Young Lady (少女)
- Francis Ng as Drug User A (道友甲)
- Fung Kam-wai as Grease A (油脂甲)
- Lee Kit-ying as Female customer (女客)
- Mo Chun-chi as Song Girl (歌女)
- Lee Shu-kai as Broken Mouth Chiu (崩口超)
- Chan Kwok Kuen as Sniper (神槍手)
- Mui Lan as Ha's mother (霞母)
- Lee Wai-hoi as Tim (添)
- Chan Tik-hak as Chuen (全)
- Ho Kwai-lam as Peter
- Lee Kwok-ping as Flower Boy Ming (花仔明)
- Hui Yat-wah as Kitty
- Tsui Man-wah as Dance girl A (舞女甲)
- Chan Ka-yin as Nurse A (護士甲)
- Yip Lai-ha as Nurse B (護士乙)
- Ng Wah-san as Fat (發)
- Tang Yu-chiu as So (蘇)
- Choi Man-sang as Hei (起)
- Chi Pui-fan as Colleague Wong (王同事)
- Lee Ching-mei as Sister Ping (萍姐)
- Hung Chi-ming as Drug user (道友)
- Tam Tin as Informant A (線人甲)
- Shek Chung-yuk as Informant B (線人乙)
- Wong Ka-kui as Chief Superintendent (總警司)
- Ma Hing-sang as Inspector (督察)
- Chan Chi-wing as Inspector (督察)
- Yan Mau-keung as Inspector (督察)
- Ho Wan as Boss Wu (胡老大)
- Tsui San-yee as Boss Tse (謝老大)
- Danny Poon as Hung (雄)
- Ling Hon as Tak (德)
- Eddy Ko as Flying Feather Foot (飛毛腿)
- Leung Hak-suen as Lawyer Cheung (張律師)
- Suen Kwai-hing as Thai drug lord (泰國毒販)
- Kam Wing-hei as Mr. Yeung (楊先生)
- Leung Hak-sun as Assistant Cheung (張助手)
- Tsang Sek-keung as Chi (志)
- Lam Wai-to as Inspector Fung (馮督察)
- Wong Sze-yan as CID
- Wong Ying-wah as CID
- Fong Wai-ming as CID
- Mak Chi-wan as CID
- Leung Siu-tik as CID
- Kam Lui as Drug dealer (毒販)
- Leung Hung as Chuen (全)
- Lee Shu-fan as Piu (標)
- Heung Hoi as Boatman (船家)
- Sin Sing-hoi as CID
- Tsui Yau-ming as CID
- Wong Lai-fat as Chiu Yau (超友)
- Law Poon-nang as Store owner (士多老板)
- Lam Man-wai as Inspector Fung (馮督察)
- Stephen Chow as Police cadet (督察學員), Righteous citizen (抱打不平的市民) (2 roles; extra)

== See also ==
- Andy Lau filmography
