= Better Halves (TV series) =

- Promo poster
- 金牌冰人
- Genre: Ancient costume, Romance, Comedy
- Created by: Hong Kong Television Broadcasts Limited
- Starring: Steven Ma; Maggie Cheung Ho-yee; Moses Chan; Joyce Koi
- Opening theme: "美麗緣份" (Beautiful Fate) by Steven Ma
- Composer: Joseph Koo
- Country of origin: Hong Kong
- Original language: Cantonese
- No. of episodes: 20

Production
- Producer: Mui Siu-ching
- Camera setup: Multi camera
- Running time: 45 minutes (20 episodes)

Original release
- Network: TVB Jade
- Release: 30 June – 25 July 2003

Better Halves (金牌冰人) is a TVB costume television series, premiered in 2003. Theme song "Beautiful Fate" (美麗緣份) composition and arrangement by Joseph Koo, lyricist by Wong Jim, sung by Steven Ma.

== Plot summary ==
Chuen Ka Fok (Steven Ma), Lien Bak Hap (Maggie Cheung Ho-yee) and Ling Wu Hei (Joyce Koi) are matchmakers in ancient China. Ka Fok and Bak Hap acting in a private capacity and Wu Hei in an official government capacity. In the course of their business Ka Fok and Bak Hap come into conflict, before deciding that they can maximize profits by working together. Despite finding matches for others Ka Fok and Bak Hap find it impossible to find a spouse for themselves, until they discover that their parents had already long ago arranged a betrothal between the two.

Ling Wu Hei is a woman who has to pretend to be a male in order to fulfill her family's hereditary office of court match maker, this leads to difficulties when she falls in love with Ko Fei (Moses Chan) in a society intolerant of homosexuals.

== Cast ==
=== Main cast ===
- Steven Ma as Chuen Ka Fok
- Maggie Cheung Ho-yee as Lien Bak Hap
- Moses Chan as Ko Fei
- Joyce Koi as Ling Wu Hei

=== Supporting cast ===
- Cerina da Graca as Sang Seung Seung
- Auguste Kwan as Ping On
- Henry Yu as Lien Yung
- Cheung Ying Choi as Ling Wu Cik
- Lily Li as Wai Leung
- Angelina Lo as Wan Leung
- Chuen Cho Fu as Lam Choi Ching
- Choi Hong Nin as Lau Sai Kwong
- June Chan as Yung Yuk Lan
- Simon Lo as Tong Man Sang
- Angela Tong as Po Yue
- Kevin Cheng as Choi Chi Chau
- Sharon Chan as Fan Chi Kiu
- Deno Cheung as Wing
- Evergreen Mak as Choi Hiu
- Winnie Yeung as Yuet Leung
- Yeung Ying Wai as Yuen Tin Ha
- Mark Kwok as Chun
- Chung Chai Bo as Ting Chung Yee
- Lo Lok Lan as Chun Tai Cho
- Lo Hoi-pang as Ting

== Viewership ratings ==
#	Timeslot (HKT)	Week	Episode(s)	Average points	Peaking points
1	Mon – Fri 20:00	30 June - 4 July 2003	1 — 5	28	--
2	Mon – Fri 20:00	07- 11 July 2003	6 — 10	30	--
3	Mon – Fri 20:00	14–18 July 2003	11 — 15	29	37
4	Mon – Fri 20:00	21–25 July 2003	16 — 20	33	41
Total average				30	
