= The Return of Luk Siu-fung =

1986 Hong Kong TV series

- VCD cover art
- 陸小鳳之鳳舞九天
- Genre: Wuxia
- Based on: Lu Xiaofeng Series by Gu Long
- Directed by: Siu Sang
- Starring: Alex Man
- Opening theme: "Leave Behind My Beautiful Dream" (留下我美夢) by Jenny Tseng
- Ending theme: "Forge the Path Ahead in the Clouds" (雲上闖前路) by Jenny Tseng
- Composer: Joseph Koo
- Country of origin: Hong Kong
- Original language: Cantonese
- No. of episodes: 40

Production
- Producer: Siu Sang
- Running time: ≈ 45 minutes per episode
- Production company: TVB

Original release
- Network: TVB
- Release: 17 March – 9 May 1986

The Return of Luk Siu-fung (陸小鳳之鳳舞九天) is a 1986 Hong Kong wuxia television series adapted from the Lu Xiaofeng Series by Gu Long. The series was first aired on TVB in Hong Kong in 1986.

== Cast ==
- Alex Man as Lu Xiaofeng
- Wong Wan-choi as Hua Manlou
- Austin Wai as Ximen Chuixue
- Rebecca Chan as Jingjing
- King Doi-yum as Xue Bing
- Lau Kong as Shi Chongwu / Liuyun Jushi
- Yung Wai-man as Niuroutang
- Ng Ka-lai as Murong Shuang
- Leung Kit-wah as Sun Xiuqing
- Bobby Au-yeung as Laoshi Heshang
- Leung Hung-wah as Sikong Zhaixing
- Yan Pak as Yuluocha
- Chan Ka-yee as Gongsun Lan
- Lee Lung-kei as Hua Yuelou
- Lee Heung-kam as Hua Manlou's mother
- Chan Wai-yu as Xue Taijun
- Sandra Ng as Qiqi
- Chu Tit-wo as Jin Jiuling
- Ko Miu-see as Li Xia
- Lau Dan as Lanhuzi
- Sze-ma Yin as Lanhuzi's wife
