= In Love and War (TV series) =

Hong Kong television drama

- Opening theme: "烽火飛花" (In Love and War) by Adam Cheng
- Composer: Joseph Koo
- Country of origin: Hong Kong
- Original language: Cantonese
- No. of episodes: 20

Production
- Producer: Stanley Fung
- Running time: 45 minutes (20 episodes)

Original release
- Network: TVB

In Love and War (烽火飛花) is a TVB television series, premiered in 1981. Theme song "In Love and War" (烽火飛花) composition and arrangement by Joseph Koo, lyricist by Wong Jim, sung by Adam Cheng. The story is based on the 1959 Hong Kong novel 《櫻子姑娘》written by 徐速.
