= Hong Kong musical tongue twister =

A Hong Kong musical tongue twister (Chinese: 急口令; pinyin: jíkǒulìng; Jyutping: gap1 hau2 ling6) is a short Cantonese advertising jingle sung like a tongue twister within Hong Kong culture. Most tunes are used in radio and television commercials.

== Background ==
Wong Jim joined British American Tobacco in 1965, and early Hong Kong jingles such as Lucky Strike were translated from English. Wong argued that the Cantonese lyrics should be written first, and the music fitted to their tones. According to musicologist Hedy Law, Wong worked in advertising full-time from 1964 to 1972, and pioneered spoken Cantonese in TV and radio jingles.

He started collaborating with Joseph Koo to write advertising songs, and later moved to TV themes.

Hong Kong jingles usually last 20 to 30 seconds. In April 2024, dozens of Koo's handwritten jingle scores dating from the 1980s to the early 1990s were found by researchers working with Koo's family in Vancouver.

== McDonald's Big Mac ==
In 1984, McDonald's ran a tongue twister contest in which participants were expected to recite the Big Mac lines within a time limit to win a certificate.

In the late 1980s, a Chiang Chi-kwong rap version followed. There was also a Chinese New Year version, and a rap version in 2017.

In 2015, Chiang performed it again at a McDonald's event. Additionally, McDonald's released a remake music video in a 1980s karaoke style.

In 2021, a Big Mac Bacon version came out with Keung To and a dance. MIRROR, ERROR and P1X3L took part, and fans posted their attempts on Instagram with the filter McDonald's made for it. The 100 best challengers won a limited-edition signed Big Mac cushion.

== Other jingles ==
Wong Jim composed a jingle sung in tongue-twister style for the Tung Tung wonton noodle chain and sang it himself.

== See also ==
- Music of Hong Kong
