= Eunuch (TV series) =

Hong Kong television series

- Opening theme: "龍仇鳳血" (Eunuch) by Adam Cheng
- Composer: Joseph Koo
- Country of origin: Hong Kong
- Original language: Cantonese
- No. of episodes: 10

Production
- Running time: 45 minutes (10 episodes)

Original release
- Network: TVB

Eunuch (龍仇鳳血) is a TVB television series, premiered in 1980 starring Wong Yuen Sun and Cecilia Wong Hang Sau. Theme song "Eunuch" (龍仇鳳血) composition and arrangement by Joseph Koo, lyricist by Wong Jim, sung by Adam Cheng.
