= Against the Blade of Honour =

1996 Hong Kong TV series

- 圓月彎刀
- Genre: Wuxia
- Based on: Yuanyue Wandao by Gu Long
- Written by: Lau Choi-wun; Sit Ka-wah; Wong Wai-keung; Cheung Man-chun
- Directed by: Leung Tak-wah; Hui Mei-kwan; Lai Tze-gim; Lai Suk-fong; Tang Gam-chuen
- Starring: Louis Koo; Noel Leung; Irene Wan; Mickey Chu; Eileen Yeow; Cheung Siu-fai
- Opening theme: "Feelings That Are Hard to Calm" (意難平) by Christine Ng
- Ending theme: "Follow Me Under the Full Moon" (圓月下你來依我) by Christine Ng
- Composer: Joseph Koo
- Country of origin: Hong Kong
- Original language: Cantonese
- No. of episodes: 20

Production
- Producer: Siu Hin-fai
- Production location: Hong Kong
- Editor: Sit Ka-wah
- Running time: ≈45 minutes per episode
- Production company: TVB

Original release
- Network: TVB
- Release: 3 July – 30 July 1997

Against the Blade of Honour (圓月彎刀) is a Hong Kong wuxia television series adapted from the novel Yuanyue Wandao by Gu Long. The series was released overseas in June 1996 before airing on TVB Jade in July 1997 in Hong Kong.

== Cast ==
- Louis Koo as Ding Peng
  - William Chu as Ding Peng (child)
- Noel Leung as Qingqing
- Cheung Siu-fai as Liu Ruosong
- Irene Wan as Qin Keqing
- Cheung Yik as Ren Tianxing
- Lee Ying as Xie Xiaoyu
- Wong Wai as Xie Xiaofeng
- Mickey Chu as Jing Wuming
- Kwan Ching as Xie Sheng
- Cheng Lui as Fang Aotian
