= Joseph Koo =

Hong Kong composer (1931–2023)

Joseph Koo MBE GBS
- 顧嘉煇
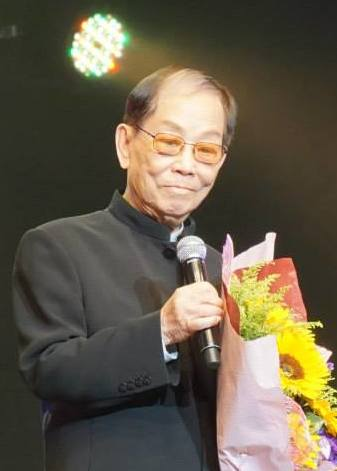
- Koo in 2014
- Born: Koo Kar-fai (顧嘉煇); 25 February 1931; Canton, China
- Died: 3 January 2023 (aged 91); Richmond Hospital, Richmond, Canada
- Occupations: Composer, arranger, Musical Director, Conductor, lyricist
- Years active: 1961–2016
- Awards: Hong Kong Film Awards – Best Original Film Score; 1990 A Terra-Cotta Warrior Golden Horse Awards – Best Music; 1964 The Dancing Millionairess; 1966 Till the End of Time

Chinese name
- Traditional Chinese: 顧嘉煇
- Simplified Chinese: 顾嘉辉
Transcriptions
Standard Mandarin
- Hanyu Pinyin: Gù Jiāhuī
Yue: Cantonese
- Jyutping: Gu3 Gaa1 fai1
- Musical career
- Also known as: Moran (莫然)
- Origin: Hong Kong
- Genres: Mandopop; jingles; Children's music; Cantopop; Hong Kong musical tongue twister
- Instruments: Piano; Xylophone
- Label: None

Joseph Koo Kar-Fai MBE GBS (Chinese: 顧嘉煇; 25 February 1931 – 3 January 2023) was a Hong Kong composer. He used the pen name Moran (莫然) for Mandarin songs early in his career. According to the Hong Kong Academy for Performing Arts, Koo was one of the most respected composers in Hong Kong.

== Early life ==
Koo was born in Canton, China and migrated with his family to Hong Kong in 1948.

Koo had two siblings: an elder sister, Hong Kong singer and painter Koo Mei (顧媚) and a younger brother, Koo Kar-Tseung (顧嘉鏘).

Koo began learning music at age 17 by taking piano lessons from a Filipino music teacher, who was already giving singing lessons to Koo's sister.

== Career ==
Koo was sponsored by Sir Run Run Shaw to attend the Berklee College of Music in Boston in the early 1960s. Upon graduation he returned to Hong Kong and worked for both the Shaw Brothers and Golden Harvest movie studios, scoring, among others, the Bruce Lee films Fist of Fury and The Way of the Dragon in 1972.

Koo joined TVB as their director of music in 1973, where from the late 1970s until immigrating to Canada in the 1990s, he collaborated with the lyricist Wong Jim on many memorable TV theme songs. Koo has composed over 1,200 songs in his career, many of which are now considered as classic Cantopop. He only has 2 notable works as a lyricist, both very short in length and total number of words. One was a children's song about the ten numbers, the other was the ending 'Goodnight' jingle for Enjoy Yourself Tonight. These two little-known facts were revealed by James Wong in 1998 during a concert dedicated to both Koo and him.

In 1961, he composed his first published song "Dream" (夢), which was sung by his sister Koo Mei. He later had another hit song "Suburban Road" 郊道. In 1974, he wrote the first Cantonese TV theme song The Fatal Irony which was one of the first popular Cantopop songs.

Koo was appointed Member of Order of the British Empire (MBE) in 1982. In 1998, he received the Bronze Bauhinia Star from the Hong Kong Government. He also received other awards including Music Accomplishment Award (from Composers and Authors Society of Hong Kong Ltd.), Highest Honour Award (from RTHK Ten Best Chinese Music Program), Best Music Award and Best Lyric Award (from Asia Film Festival), Hong Kong Film Awards, Taiwan's Golden Horse Film Festival and Awards.

Koo immigrated to Canada in the 1990s but continued his work in Hong Kong music. In 2007, he wrote the theme song for The Drive of Life, a drama produced by TVB to celebrate the 10th anniversary of the Hong Kong handover.

In 2012 from 30 November to 3 December, he held a concert titled "Joseph Koo Concert 2012" at the Hong Kong Coliseum, which featured many singers including Adam Cheng, George Lam, Teresa Cheung, and Anthony Wong. In 2015, he announced his retirement as a conductor, and that he would significantly reduce his musical works and become an oil painter like his sister.

Koo died in Richmond, Canada on 3 January 2023, at age 91. Joseph's son, Koo Chi Ho, revealed that he had suffered symptoms and complications of COVID-19 and decreased appetite and energy weeks before his death. He was otherwise fit and healthy beforehand.

== Selected compositions ==
- Dream (夢) (1961)
- The Legend of the Book and Sword (書劍恩仇錄), theme song from TV series The Legend of the Book and Sword (1976)
- Hotel (狂潮), theme song from TV series Hotel (1976)
- The Legend of the Heroic Knights (近代豪俠傳) (1976)
- Luk Siu Fung (陸小鳳), theme song from TV series Luk Siu Fung (1976)
- The Great Vendetta (大報復), theme song from TV series The Great Vendetta (1977)
- A House Is Not a Home (家變), theme song from TV series A House Is Not a Home (1977)
- Decisive Battle Eve (決戰前夕), theme song from TV series Luk Siu Fung II (1977)
- Vanity Fair (大亨), theme song from TV series Vanity Fair (1978)
- The Romantic Swordsman (小李飛刀), theme song from TV series The Romantic Swordsman (1978)
- Heaven Sword and Dragon Sabre (倚天屠龍記), theme song from TV series Heaven Sword and Dragon Sabre (1978)
- The Flaming Ceremonial Fire (熊熊聖火), sub theme song from TV series Heaven Sword and Dragon Sabre (1978)
- The Giants (強人), theme song from TV series The Giants (1978)
- The Oath Must Enter the Mountain of Sword (誓要入刀山), theme song from TV series Luk Siu Fung III (1978)
- Not Sentiments (情未了) (1978)
- Conflict (奮鬥), theme song from TV series Conflict (1978)
- Game of Death (死亡遊戲), theme song from the movie Game of Death (1978)
- Below the Lion Rock (獅子山下) (1979)
- Over the Rainbow (天虹), theme song from TV series Over the Rainbow (1979)
- The Passenger (抉擇), theme song from TV series The Passenger (1979)
- Chor Lau Heung (楚留香), theme song from TV series Chor Lau Heung (1979)
- The Good, the Bad and the Ugly (網中人), theme song from TV series The Good, the Bad and the Ugly (1979)
- The Heroes of Man and Sea (人海奇譚) (1979)
- 春雨彎刀, theme song from TV series God of Sabre (刀神) (1979)
- Wind and Clouds (風雲), theme song from TV series This Land is Mine (1980)
- Leaves Depart From the Tear Hard to Endure (難忍別離淚), theme song from TV series In Search of (1980)
- The Bund of Shanghai (上海灘), theme song from TV series The Bund (1980), performed by Frances Yip
- The Brothers (親情), theme song from TV series The Brothers (1980)
- The Discovery Bay (發現灣), theme song from TV series The Discovery Bay (1980)
- The Invincible Medic (仁者無敵), theme song from TV series The Invincible Medic (1980)
- Five Easy Pieces (輪流傳), theme song from TV series Five Easy Pieces (1980)
- All Kind Sentiments (萬般情), theme song from TV series The Bund II (1980)
- Eunuch (龍仇鳳血), theme song from TV series Eunuch (1980)
- The Adventurer's (衝擊), theme song from TV series The Adventurer's (1980)
- The Sentimental Debts (情債), sub theme song from TV series The Adventurer's (1980)
- Shanghai Beach of the Dragon Tiger Battle (上海灘龍虎鬥), theme song from TV series The Bund III (1980)
- Famous Sword (名劍) (1980)
- Using Love to Steal a Heart (用愛将心偷), theme song from TV series The Shell Game (1980)
- Personhood Loves Freedom (做人愛自由), theme song from TV series The Misadventure of Zoo (1981)
- Cheers (飲勝), sub theme song from TV series The Misadventure of Zoo (1981)
- In Love and War (烽火飛花), theme song from TV series In Love and War (1981)
- Both are forgotten in the mist (兩忘煙水裡), theme song from TV series Demi-Gods and Semi-Devils I (天龍八部之六脈神劍) (1982)
- Breath and Depths of Mountains and Waters (萬水千山縱橫), theme song from TV series Demi-Gods and Semi-Devils II (天龍八部之虛竹傳奇) (1982), performed by Susanna Kwan
- Forgets With All One's Heart the Sentiment (忘盡心中情), theme song from TV series The Legend of Master So (1982)
- Heart Debt (心債), theme song from TV series Soldier of Fortune (1982), performed by Anita Mui
- Being at a High Game (胸懷大志), theme song from TV series The Emissary (1982)
- Approaches the Upstream Silently (默默向上游) (1982)
- Iron Blood Loyal Heart (鐵血丹心), theme song from TV series The Legend of the Condor Heroes, 1983. Sung by Roman Tam and Jenny Tseng
- Meaningful Life (一生有意義), theme song from TV series The Legend of the Condor Heroes, 1983. Sung by Roman Tam and Jenny Tseng
- Say Hello to the World (世間始終你好), theme song from TV series The Legend of the Condor Heroes, 1983. Sung by Roman Tam and Jenny Tseng
- When Will We Meet Again (何日再相見), theme song from TV series The Return of the Condor Heroes (1983)
- Keeping Today's Romance (留住今日情), insert theme from TV series The Return of the Condor Heroes (1983)
- The Strong Bond of the Two Hearts (情義兩心堅), insert theme from TV series The Return of the Condor Heroes (1983)
- You're the One Who Decides to Love (愛定你一個), theme song from TV series The Radio Tycoon (1983)
- Heroine (巾幗英雄), theme song from TV series The Legend of the Unknowns (1983)
- Hands Over My Heart (交出我的心), theme song from TV series Woman on the Beat (1983)
- Descendants of the Yellow Emperor (黄帝子孫), theme song from the movie Zu Warriors from the Magic Mountain (1983)
- TVB News Theme (1983)
- Brave and Fearless (勇者無懼), theme song from TV series The Return of Wong Fei Hung (1984)
- A Ray of Love (一縷情), insert theme from TV series The Return of Wong Fei Hung (1984)
- The Demon Region Paradise (魔域桃源), theme song from TV series The Other Side of the Horizon (1984)
- In Dream Several Sorrow (夢裏幾番哀), theme song from TV series The Foundation (1984)
- I Cannot See My Tears Flow (不見我淚流), sub theme song from TV series The Foundation (1984)
- It Will Be Throughout Lucky (始終會行運), theme song from TV series The Duke of Mount Deer (1984)
- Sentimental Cold Lust (情冷情熱), theme song from TV series Sword Stained with Royal Blood (1985)
- Brave and Invincible (勇者無敵), theme song from TV series The Yang's Saga (1985)
- Me and You, He and Me (我與你 他與我), theme song from TV series The Rough Ride (1985)
- The Song of Chu (楚歌), theme song from TV series The Battlefield (1985)
- The Flying Fox of the Snowy Mountains (雪山飛狐), theme song from TV series The Flying Fox of the Snowy Mountains (1985)
- TVB Cares Song (事事關心歌) (1986)
- Weave Beautiful Dreams (編織美夢), theme song from TV series Heir to the Throne Is... (1986)
- In the Sentimental Past (當年情), theme song from the movie A Better Tomorrow (1986)
- Leaves Behind My Fond Dream (留下我美夢), theme song from TV series The Return of Luk Siu Fung (1986)
- Holds Up the Head to Sing to the Day (昂首向天唱) (1986)
- The Illumination of a Thousand World (光照萬世), theme song from TV series The Legend of Wong Tai Sin (1986)
- Passing With the Wind (隨風而逝), sub theme song from TV series The Legend of Wong Tai Sin (1986)
- Will Rush Toward Future Day (奔向未來的日子), theme song from the movie A Better Tomorrow II (1987)
- The Infinite Journey (無限旅程), theme song from TV series The Price of Growing Up (1987)
- Still the Heart Was Thinking You (仍然心在想你), sub theme song from TV series The Price of Growing Up (1987)
- The Humanity's Mistake (人類的錯), theme song from TV series Born to Be a King (1987)
- Youth Heart (少年心), sub theme song from TV series Born to Be a King (1987)
- Hu Han Dream (胡漢夢), theme song from TV series The Legend of the Book and Sword (1987)
- The Chrysanthemum Tears (菊花淚), theme song from TV series Deadly Secret (1989)
- Small Boat Lover (扁舟情侶) (1989)
- Wild Rose (野玫瑰) (1989)
- The Special Express (特別快車) (1989)
- Heart of Fire (焚心以火) (1990)
- Young Heartless (年少無情), theme song from TV series The God's of Demons of Zu Mountain (1990)
- Does Not Hope Again Tangled Up (不願再纏綿), sub theme song from TV series The God's of Demons of Zu Mountain (1990)
- Long Flow, Not Rest (長流不息) (1992)
- The Buddhism Palm Strikes Back (如來神掌), theme song from TV series The Buddhism Palm Strikes Back (1993)
- Detains the Fall Scenery (留住秋色), sub theme song from TV series The Buddhism Palm Strikes Back (1993)
- The Life Isn't to Drunk Awakenings (一生不醉醒), theme song from TV series The Condor Heroes Returns (1993)
- To Die, To A Unique Skill (絕世絕招), theme song from TV series The Legend of the Condor Heroes (1994)
- Difficult Even Agreement (意難平), theme song from TV series Against the Blade of Honour (1994)
- You Come to My Next Full Moon (圓月下你來依我), sub theme song from TV series Against the Blade of Honour (1994)
- Splendid Story (精彩故事), theme song from TV series Corner the Con Man (1997)
- Has You Rarely (難得有你), theme song from TV series Corner the Con Man (1997)
- Top of the Head, One Piece of the Day (頭頂一片天) (1998)
- The Cool Breeze Does Not Dye (清風不染), theme song from TV series Justice Sung II (1999)
- The Wine of Mellow Shade (醇酒醉影), theme song from TV series Country Spirit (2001)
- The Immortal of the Water Center (水中仙), theme song from TV series Where the Legend Begins (2002)
- Beautiful Fate (美麗緣份), theme song from TV series Better-halves (2003)
- The Sky is Blue (天這樣藍), theme song from TV series Drive of Life (2007)
- Glory Mark (光輝的印記) (2008)

Awards and achievements
Preceded by nil	Golden Needle Award of RTHK Top Ten Chinese Gold Songs Award; 1981	Succeeded by Nonoy Ocampo 奧金寶
