= The Giants (TV series) =

1978 Hong Kong television series

- Opening theme: "強人" (The Giants) by Roman Tam
- Composer: Joseph Koo
- Country of origin: Hong Kong
- Original language: Cantonese
- No. of episodes: 110

Production
- Running time: 45 minutes (110 episodes)

Original release
- Network: TVB

The Giants (強人) is a TVB television series, premiered on 15 May 1978. Theme song "The Giants" (強人) composition and arrangement by Joseph Koo, lyricist by Wong Jim, sung by Roman Tam.
