= The Heaven Sword and Dragon Saber (1978 TV series) =

1978 Hong Kong TV series

- VCD cover art
- 倚天屠龍記
- Genre: Wuxia
- Based on: The Heaven Sword and Dragon Saber by Jin Yong
- Screenplay by: Wu Sa; Siu Nga
- Directed by: Chiu Chun-keung; Chan Yu-chiu; Lee Ting-lun
- Starring: Adam Cheng; Liza Wang; Angie Chiu; Wong Wan-choi; Sharon Yeung; Idy Chan; Ha Yu; Gigi Wong; Shih Kien
- Theme music composer: Joseph Koo
- Opening theme: "The Heaven Sword and Dragon Saber" (倚天屠龍記) by Adam Cheng
- Ending theme: "Sacred Flame" (熊熊聖火) by Adam Cheng
- Country of origin: Hong Kong
- Original language: Cantonese
- No. of episodes: 25

Production
- Executive producer: Chiu Chun-keung
- Production location: Hong Kong
- Editor: Wu Sa
- Running time: ≈45 minutes per episode
- Production company: TVB

Original release
- Network: TVB Jade
- Release: 13 May – 16 June 1978

The Heaven Sword and Dragon Saber (倚天屠龍記) is a Hong Kong wuxia television series adapted from the novel of the same title by Jin Yong. Starring Adam Cheng, Liza Wang and Angie Chiu in the lead roles, the series was first broadcast on TVB Jade in Hong Kong in 1978.

== Cast ==
- Adam Cheng as Zhang Wuji
  - Wong Tsung-chi as Zhang Wuji (young)
- Liza Wang as Zhao Min
- Angie Chiu as Zhou Zhiruo
- Wong Wan-choi as Yang Xiao
- Sharon Yeung as Yang Buhui / Ji Xiaofu
- Idy Chan as Xiaozhao
- Ha Yu as Zhang Cuishan
- Gigi Wong as Yin Susu
- Chong Man-ching as Yin Li
- Shih Kien as Xie Xun
- Wong Sun as Chaghan Temur
- Lok Kung as Kongjian
- Kong Ngai as Cheng Kun
- Cheung Ying-choi as Yu Daiyan
- Kent Cheng as Shuobude
- Liu Wai-hung as Zhang Songxi
- Tam Chuen-hing as Mo Shenggu
- Lam Wai-to as Yin Liting
- Kwan Hoi-san as Zhang Sanfeng
- Kwan Kin as Yu Lianzhou
- Lam Man-wai as Xianyu Tong
- Tsang Chor-lam as Tang Wenliang
- Chow Kit as Kongzhi
- Ho Pik-kin as Zhu Changling
- Siu Leung as He Taichong
- Cheng Siu-ping as Ban Shuxian
- Kong Ho-oi as Ding Minjun
- Sheung-koon Yuk as Miejue
- Cheung Wut-yau as Song Yuanqiao
- Pui Wun as Jingxuan
- Kwan Cung as Song Qingshu
- Ye Fung as Zhou Dian
- Ma Heng-sang as Zhang Zhong
- Kam Hing-yin as Leng Qian
- Tam Kam-wah as Peng Yingyu
- Wong Bing-lun as Yin Yewang
- Bak Man-biu as Yin Tianzheng
- Cheung Sang as Kongwen
- Ng Yuen-chun as Zong Weixia
- Yeung Yin-tong as Wei Yixiao
- Lai Wing-keung as Chang Yuchun
- Ko Kong as Lu Zhangke
- Tsui Kwong-lam as He Biweng
- Lee Do-yu as Fan Yao
- Si Ming as Daiqisi
- Lung Tin-sang as Chen Youliang
- Ma Hon-yuen as Yang Dingtian
- Cheng Nai-kan as Zhu Yuanzhang
- Lam Yan-yan as the Yellow Dress Maiden
- Kiu Hung as Wang Baobao
- Wong Bak-man as Xu Da
