= Paula Tsui =

Hong Kong Cantopop singer

Paula Tsui Siu-fung
- 徐小鳳
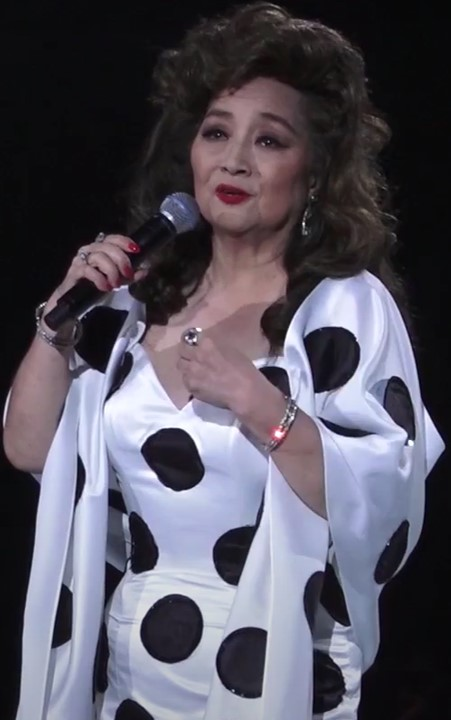
- Tsui performing in Hong Kong in 2018
- Born: Tsui Wan-shu (徐鄖書); 1 January 1949 (age 77); Wuhan, Hubei, China
- Occupation: Singer
- Years active: 1969–1992; 2005–present
- Spouse: Albert Cheng (m. 1974; div. 1979)

Chinese name
- Traditional Chinese: 徐小鳳
- Simplified Chinese: 徐小凤
Transcriptions
Standard Mandarin
- Hanyu Pinyin: Xú Xiǎofèng
- Bopomofo: ㄒㄩˊ ㄒㄧㄠˇ ㄈㄥˋ
- Wade–Giles: Hsü^{2} Hsiao^{3}-feng^{4}
- Tongyong Pinyin: Syú Siǎo-fòng
- IPA: [ɕy̌ ɕjàʊ fə̂ŋ]
Yue: Cantonese
- Yale Romanization: Chèuih Síufūng
- Jyutping: ceoi4 siu2 fung1
- IPA: [tsʰɵɥ˩ siw˧˥ fʊŋ˥]
- Musical career
- Also known as: Sister Siu Fung
- Origin: Hong Kong
- Genre: Cantopop
- Instrument: Singing
- Labels: Man Chi Records (1970–1973); Wing Hang Music (1973–1978); Sony Music Entertainment (1978–1981); Contec Sound Media (1982–1985); PolyGram (1986–1991)
- Website: www.paulatsui.com

Paula Tsui Siu-fung (born 1 January 1949) is a Hong Kong singer, with a career spanning over 50 years. She was affiliated with the TVB television station until the mid-1990s and has performed for Asia Television on several occasions since 1995. Over fourteen of her albums have been certified platinum by the IFPI Hong Kong.

== Personal life ==
After graduating from secondary school, Tsui worked at her father's salon as a nail technician and hairstylist.

Tsui was born in Hubei, but her family moved to Hong Kong when she was still a baby. Her career began in 1969 as a supporting act in a nightclub. Her parents did not approve of her pursuing a career in music.

== Career ==
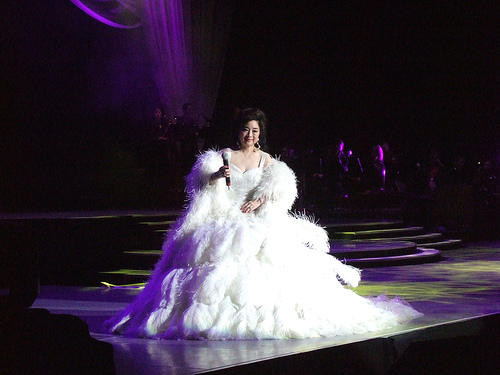
Tsui performing at the "Glittering Bright Paula Tsui Live in Concert 2006" at the MGM Grand Garden Arena in Las Vegas on 29 January 2006.

After winning a contest in 1966, she soon began performing. She moved from lounges to nightclubs and then to being a support act for others. A record executive was in the audience during one of her nightclub performances and offered her a lucrative contract. After signing the contract, Tsui was not allowed to perform in nightclubs again.

Tsui is popularly known for her gowns.

Awards
Preceded by The Wynners	Golden Needle Award of RTHK Top Ten Chinese Gold Songs Award; 1989	Succeeded by Wong Jim
