= Angie Chiu =

Hong Kong actress (born 1953)

Angie Chiu Ngar Chi
- Chinese: 趙雅芝
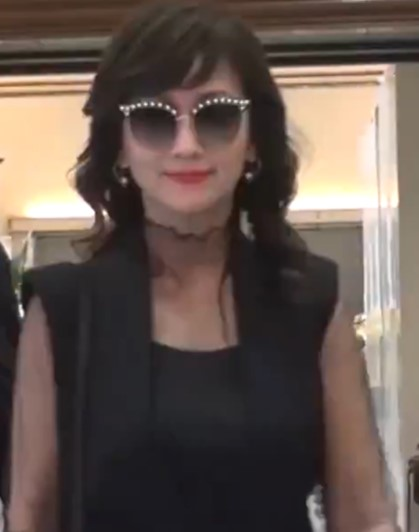
- Chiu attending the funeral service of Rosa Chan (陳紫蓮), the former Honorary Advisor of the Wai Yin Association's (慧妍雅集) on 12 September 2019.
- Born: Chiu Ngar-chi; 15 November 1953 (age 72); British Hong Kong
- Education: Shung Tak Catholic English College
- Occupation: Actress
- Years active: 1975–present
- Spouses: Wong Hon-wai (m. 1975; div. 1983) Melvin Wong (m. 1984)
- Children: Gary Wong (son); Ronnie Wong (son); Wesley Wong (son)
- Awards: TVB Anniversary Awards – All-Time Most Memorable Female Leading Roles; 1999 The Bund (1980)

Chinese name
- Traditional Chinese: 趙雅芝
- Simplified Chinese: 赵雅芝
Transcriptions
Standard Mandarin
- Hanyu Pinyin: Zhào Yǎzhī
Yue: Cantonese
- Jyutping: Ziu3 Ngaa2 Zi1

Angie Chiu Ngar Chi (Chinese: 趙雅芝; pinyin: Zhào Yǎzhī; born 15 November 1954) is a Hong Kong actress, and was the third runner up in the 1973 Miss Hong Kong pageant.

== Early life ==
In 1953, Chiu was born in Hong Kong. In 1971, Chiu graduated from Shung Tak Catholic English College and later worked as a flight attendant at Japan Airlines. In 1973, Chiu participated in the first Miss Hong Kong contest organized by TVB and won the third runner-up.

== Career ==
Chiu started her career as a flight attendant for Japan Airline.

In 1973, Chiu participated in Miss Hong Kong Pageant.

In 1970s, Chiu's acting career began. Chiu is most noted for her leading role in The Heaven Sword And Dragon Saber, Chor Lau Heung, The Bund, opposite Chow Yun-fat and Lui Leung-Wai.

Chiu is a well known actress in Hong Kong, Taiwan, Macau, and Mainland China.

== Personal life ==
In 1975, Chiu married Wong Hon-wai (黃漢偉), a medical doctor. They had two children, Gary Wong (黃光宏) and Ronnie Wong (黃光宜). In 1983, Chiu divorced Wong Hon-wai. In 1984, Chiu married Melvin Wong, an actor. On 7 January 1986, their son Wesley Wong (黃愷傑) was born. Chiu's son Wesley later became an actor.

== Filmography ==
=== Film ===
This is a partial list of films.

Year	English Title	Chinese Title	Role	Notes/Ref.
1976	The Private Eyes	半斤八兩	Jackie	
1977	Money Crazy	发钱寒		
1979	The Kung Fu Instructor	教头		
1979	The Secret			
1981	Job Hunter	失业生		Guest Star
1986	Heroes Shed No Tears	英雄无泪		
1991	The Banquet	豪門夜宴		Guest Star
2010	You Deserve to Be Single	活该你单身		
2010	Showtime	用心跳		

=== Television series ===
Year	English Title	Chinese Title	Role	Notes/Ref.
1978	Vanity Fair	大亨	Zhu Minzhi (朱敏芝)	(TVB)
1978	The Heaven Sword and Dragon Saber	倚天屠龍記	Chow Chi-yeuk	(TVB)
1978	Conflict	奮鬥	(徐承菲)	(TVB)
1979	The God of Sabre	刀神	Ching-ching	(TVB), A Hong Kong television miniseries adapted from Gu Long's novel the moon scimitar book.
1979	Chor Lau-heung	楚留香	So Yung-yung	(TVB)
1980	The Bund	上海灘	Fung Ching-ching (馮程程)	(TVB)
1980	The Adventurer's	衝擊	(曾素婷)	(TVB)
1981	In Love and War	烽火飛花	(犬養櫻子)	(TVB)
1981	The Hawk	飛鷹	(倪天兒/素素)	(TVB)
1981	The Legend of Wonder Lady	女黑俠木蘭花	(木蘭花)	(TVB)
1982	The Switch	雙面人	(姚淑華)	(TVB)
1982	All The Wrong Shoes	福星高照	(程芷霜)	(TVB)
1983	The Radio Tycoon	播音人	Au Yeuk-chi (歐若芷)	(TVB)
1983	No Biz Like Showbiz	三相逢	(老若翩)	(TVB)
1983	Good Morning Mother In Law	奶奶早晨	(程福珍)	(TVB)
1984	The Sacred Commandment	武林聖火令	(任依依)	(TVB), Enjoy Yourself Tonight (EYT)
1984	The Other Side of the Horizon	魔域桃源	Tong Kei (唐琪)	(TVB)
1984	Gary 39's Angel	黃金約會	(洪潔嬣)	(TVB)
1985	The Flying Fox of Snowy Mountain	(雪山飛狐)	Ma Chun-fa	(TVB)
1985	The Yang's Saga	(楊家將)	Guan Yin	(TVB), Guest Star
1985	The Reincarnated Princess	观世音	Miu Sin / Guan Yin	(TVB), Enjoy Yourself Tonight (EYT)
1991	The Chronicles of Emperor Qianlong (Xi Shuo Qian Long)			(China TV) with Adam Cheng co-stars
1992	New Legend of Madame White Snake	新白娘子傳奇	Bai Su Zhen / Hu Mei Niang	(TVB), (1995 TTV)
2003	Point of No Return	西關大少	Ng Yuk Hing	
2004	Warriors of the Yang Clan	楊門虎將	She Saihua, wife of Yang Ye.	
2015	Master of Destiny	風雲天地	Mok Nga-man (莫雅文)	Guest Star
2017	The Destiny of White Snake	天乩之白蛇传说	Holy mother of Mount Li	Guest Star
2020	Imperfect Love	不完美的她	Zhong Hui	
2021	The Rebel Princess	上阳赋	Princess Jinmin	

== Awards & titles ==
- Miss Hong Kong Pageant 1973 Third Runner-up
- TVB Anniversary Awards 1999 All-Time Most Memorable Female Leading Role ~ The Bund

== See also ==
- Miss Hong Kong Pageant#Summary of winners
