= Kwan Hoi-san =

Hong Kong actor

Herman Kwan Hoi-San
- 關海山
- Born: Kwan Ming-kok (關銘覺); October 23, 1925; Guangzhou, Guangdong, Republic of China
- Died: September 11, 2006 (aged 80); Kwong Wah Hospital, Hong Kong
- Other names: Uncle Shrimp (蝦叔); Kwan Ling (關寧)
- Occupation: Actor
- Years active: 1949–2001
- Agent: TVB
- Spouse: 4
- Children: 3 sons 2 daughters
- Father: Kwan Yiu-fai
- Awards: Hong Kong Film Awards – Best Supporting Actor; 1992 Lee Rock Golden Horse Awards – Best Supporting Actor; 1991 Lee Rock TVB Anniversary Awards – Life Achievement Award; 2001 Lifetime Achievement

Chinese name
- Traditional Chinese: 關海山
- Simplified Chinese: 关海山
Transcriptions

Kwan Ming-kok
- Traditional Chinese: 關銘覺
- Simplified Chinese: 关铭觉
Transcriptions

Herman Kwan Hoi-San (Chinese: 關海山) (born Kwan Ming-kok; October 23, 1925 – September 11, 2006) was a Hong Kong actor. His English name was Herman Kwan. Kwan started off as a Cantonese opera actor in street theatre before joining New Voice Opera Troupe (新聲劇團). He also started singing for early Hong Kong film soundtracks and moved on to act in films, mostly adaption of opera in Cantonese. He became famous and acted in many lead roles. When Hong Kong films started to move towards Mandarin, Kwan's career faltered and joined TVB and acted in various roles. Directors and filmmakers rediscovered his talent and cast him in many supporting roles in films. In 2001, Kwan suffered a stroke and was left mute and paralysed. He died in 2006.

== Career ==
Kwan at an early age, followed his father Kwan Yiu-fai (關耀輝), studied Cantonese opera. At 11, he started playing in public. At the time, Cantonese opera was mainly street theatre: actors were acting on a stage built in front of a temple or a market. He left Guangzhou for Hong Kong after World War II. Later, Kwan Hoi San will join the greatest troupes of that time, such as the New Voice Opera Troupe (新聲劇團) which featured Yam Kim-fai.

In the 1940s, Kwan started singing for the Hong Kong-produced Cantonese films soundtracks. Cantonese cinema was booming then and stars from the Cantonese opera moved on to act in them. Kwan followed suit and started acting in films soon after. The films were often adaptations from the Cantonese opera repertoire. His first movie is Huet Chai Huet Seung (血债血偿). His fame as a cinema actor quickly goes beyond the one he had built as a theatre actor. He often acts with famous actors such as Cho Tat-wah, Cheung Ying, Lau Hak-suen and Shih Kien. This beautiful era wherein he was the young lead last until the end of the 1960s, when the arrival of the Mandarin language productions from the Shaw Brothers will impose juvenile faces to the public, such as Jimmy Wang Yu, David Chiang Da Wei or Yueh Hua. Kwan Hoi San and his friends had then to accept this change. Some returned to theatre, others continued to do movies in Cantonese while participating in productions shot then in Mandarin in big studios such as Shaw Brothers or Cathay Asia Films. Other also will integrate television, then still on its early stage, where they will meet again some filmmakers that have also turned toward TV.

Kwan Hoi-san's cinema career went downhill until the mid-1970s. In 1976, he joined TVB, which he didn't leave up until the early 2000s. During his television period, he quickly became a great and must-have supporting part in the soaps. Not unlike in cinema, Kwan Hoi San was able to perform all kinds of characters in the small screen without troubling his audience. He was, from one series to another, a good family man, a Kung-fu master, a machiavellian godfather, a minister of the emperor, a Taoist magician, a firm manager, a historical character or also a traitor to the country. The part he was the most often attributed was that of the patriarch of a rich family in decay, in the long emblematic series of the channel. Other stars from TVB have confronted him more than once in the long series of the channel: Chow Yun Fat, Carol Cheng Yu Ling and Simon Yam Tat Wah in Brothers/Tsan Ching (亲情), Adam Cheng Siu Chow in Clan of Intrigues/Chor Lau Heung (楚留香), Andy Lau Tak Wah and Tony Leung Chiu Wai in The Duke of Mount Deer/Luk Ding Kei (鹿鼎记), Felix Wong Yat Wah and Ray Lui Leung Wai in Kung Fu Master of Fat Shan/Fat San Chan Sin Sang (佛山赞先生), Stephen Chow Sing Chi in The Justice of Life/Ta Loi Chi Kong Woo (他來自江湖) or also Lau Ching Wan in The Battle Among The Clans/Dai Heung Kong (大香港). In 1982, in The Demi-Gods and Demi-Devils/Tin Lung Pa Po (天龙八部), he crossed the path of Leung Kar Yan, but also Kwan Chung (关聪), one of his sons.

In the meantime, Kwan Hoi San kept on working in the cinema industry with more or less outstanding parts. In the 1980s, just like a Bill Tung Biu, Kwan Hoi San found a second fame within cinema thanks to his successful television career. Young filmmakers, including those who knew him from TV sets, rediscovered him, and offered him interesting supporting parts. When he was well directed, the result was, for an example, Brothers From Walled City, or Hong Kong, Hong Kong. In the latter, he acts an old violent single man who ends up marrying Cherie Chung Chor Hung, an illegal immigrant coming from China and in love with Alex Man Chi Leung.

Kwan Hoi San had also the honour of presiding over the association of Cantonese opera companies of Hong Kong.

In 1991, he won the Hong Kong Film Award and the Taiwanese Golden Horse in the best male supporting role category for his part in Lee Rock by Lawrence Ah Mon. Western viewers can see his part in Project A and Project A II by Jackie Chan, where he plays the superior of the star, hunched up in his third-rate uniform. Jackie Chan and Sammo Hung Kam Bo were enjoying paying tribute to past Cantonese cinema stars by reuniting them in their productions. Kwan Hoi San in Hard Boiled was the old godfather for whom things were much too complicated because of the young generation of gangsters, led by Anthony Wong Chau Sang, and he was “betrayed” by Tony Leung Chiu Wai.

In 2005, TVB (which dropped him after his accident) paid a tribute to Kwan Hoi San during a special show. Kwan Hoi San had participated in more than 300 films and TV soaps.

== Personal life ==
Kwan liked to drink and smoke. He was also a collector of paintings, Chinese calligraphies and pipes. He had three sons and three daughters from four wives, although his first three marriages were never legally registered. Kwan's first wife was also an actress who came from Guangdong and together they have an adopted daughter. During a tour in south Vietnam, he met his second wife (黃麗). He had two sons (關楚雄) (關聰) and a daughter (關婉清) with her. His third wife (葉娥瑞) is a Malaysian and they have a daughter (關至瑩). Kwan met his fourth wife (曾娣蓉), a Singaporean, in 1969 and they have a son (關可維).

In 2001, he suffered from an apoplexy attack and was left paralysed and mute. His condition improved but relapsed at time. On the morning 11 September 2006, Kwan's fourth wife noticed that he was not feeling well and sent him to Kwong Wah Hospital. Kwan died shortly later from complications arising from high blood pressure and diabetes.

== Filmography ==
=== Films ===
- 1949 Dead End Case
- 1962 Scarlet Boy (aka Battles with the Red Boy) - Monk Tong Sang.
- 1962 Huo long nu tun shuang hu jiang
- 1962 Hong hai er - Tripitaka
- 1963 Ying E sha sao
- 1964 Ru lai shen zhang shang ji - Luk Yu
- Ru lai shen zhang xia ji da jie ju (1964) - Luk Yu
- Wudang fei feng Shang ji (1964)
- Wudang fei feng Xia ji (1964)
- Ru lai shen zhang san ji da jie ju (1964)
- Ru lai shen zhang si ji da jie ju (1964)
- Man tang ji qing (1964)
- Da hong pao (1965)
- Qian shou shen quan shang ji (1965)
- Yi di xia yi xue shang ji (1965)
- Qian shou shen quan xia ji (1965)
- Yi di xia yi xue Xia ji (1965)
- Wu lin di yi jian (1965)
- Xue zi di yi hao (1965)
- Ru lai shen zhang nu sui Wan Jian Men (1965)
- Xue zhai xue zhai (1965)
- 1966 Choi fung wing wah seung bai seung
- 1967 Uproar in Jade Hall - Chor Ba-Tin.
- 1967 Yu nu jin gang
- 1967 Long feng zheng gua shuai
- 1967 Bao die ji
- 1969 Xue luo jin
- Ming jian Tian Jiao (1969)
- Ri yue shen tong (1971)
- Cui hua du jiang tou (1975)
- Fo Shan Zan xian sheng (1978)
- Bao cuo da ya chai cuo gu (1978)
- Ge shi ge fa (1979)
- Tian cai lao qian (1979)
- Zhuang ju zai yu Niu gan yan (1979)
- Yu huo fen qin (1979)
- Yan bao fu (1979)
- Chu cu chuo tou fa cu cai (1980)
- A-Sir pi pao (1980)
- Xie dou chuan (1980) - Boss Kwei Lei-wang
- Shao Lin fo jia da dao (1980)
- Zhi fa zhe (1981)
- Jing wang shuang xiong (1981) - Uncle
- Dian ma ling hou (1981)
- Shang ren shi qi (1981)
- Lao chen dang wang (1981)
- Da qiao ying xiong zhuan (1981) - Yau Bun Lap
- Sha chu xi ying pan (1982)
- Guang Dong liang zai yu (1982)
- Brothers from the Walled City (1982)
- Chong ji 21 (1982)
- Heng sao yu dan dang (1982) - Ching Hak-Dai
- Shen Sheng Yi (1983)
- Di yi ba jiao yi (1983)
- Shaolin and Wu Tang (1983) - Master Law
- Hong Kong, Hong Kong (1983)
- Du gu (1983) - Dr. Kwok
- Project A (1983) - Captain Chi
- Feng shui er shi nian (1983) - Hotel Manager
- Lin tai (1984)
- Du zhou (1985)
- Da gung wong dai (1985) - Uncle Ha
- Lian huan pao (1985)
- Xiao nian Su Qi Er (1985)
- Ru lai ba gua gun (1985)
- Meng gui po ren (1985)
- Tian sha (1986)
- Xiong zhou (1986) - Au Yeung
- Crocodile Evil (1986)
- Kai xin kuai huo ren (1987)
- Tian guan ci fu (1987) - Peter's Father
- Project A II (1987) - Captain Chi
- Rou pu tuan (1987)
- Ban xian jiang (1988) - Master Chan
- Long hu zhi duo xing (1988)
- Mong gwai yee yuen (1988)
- Meng gui zhou (1988)
- Liang zai gan tan (1988)
- Xi Ya Tu da tu sha (1988)
- Sat sau woo dip mung (1989) - Uncle Cheung
- Zui nui chung on cho (1989)
- Gun gun hong chun (1989) - Master Pai
- Miao jie huang hou (1990) - Luke
- Fung yue tung lo (1990) - Uncle Kin
- Mong ming ying luen (1990)
- Jin pai shuang long (1990) - Uncle Chuck
- Tu ying dang an (1991) - Chief Inspector Chan Fong
- Lee Rock (1991) - Uncle
- Ho moon yeh yin (1991) - Uncle Chicken Roll
- Se jiang (1991)
- Hua jie shen nu (1991) - Judge
- Tang xi feng yue hen (1992)
- Ga yau hei si (1992) - Papa Shang
- Casino Tycoon (1992) - Fu Lao-Cha
- Hard Boiled (1992) - Mr. Hoi (Guest star)
- Nu hei xia Huang Ying (1992) - Yip
- Gaan moh (1992)
- Devil of Rape (1992)
- Huang Fei Hong xi lie: Zhi yi dai shi (1992) - Mayor
- Long zhi gen (1992)
- Huang Daxian (1992) - Taoist master
- Ri luo ka men (1993)
- Tin joek yau ching II: Tin cheung dei gau (1993) - Bill
- Yi dai xiao xiong: San zhi qi (1993)
- Tian tai de yue guang (1993) - Uncle Bill
- Perfect Exchange (1993) - Robinson
- Heroes Among Heroes (1993) - Beggar Chie
- Yi jiu si jiu: Jie hou ying xiong zhuan (1993)
- Tian shan yu nu jian (1993)
- Ging fa yue lau ang (1993) - Prosecutor Yin Li Shan
- The Great Conqueror's Concubine (1994) - Feng's Father
- Kuang ye sheng si lian (1995) - Zhang Qiao
- Sai Wan fau see (1995) - Dad
- Bian cheng xiao xiong (1995)
- Thanks for Your Love (1996)
- Young and Dangerous 5 (1998) - Datuk's Friend
- Portland Street Blues (1998) - Uncle Pun
- Sik gong II maan lee kui moh (1998)
- Dong lui chi nam (1999) - Kwan
- Chi chung sze loi liu (2000) - Old Wan
- Queen of Kowloon (2000) - Ka Ming (final film role)

=== Television ===
- The Legend of the Book and the Sword (1976) - Luk Fei-ching
- Luk Siu Fung (1976) - Yuk Doyan
- The Heaven Sword and Dragon Saber (1978) - Cheung Sam-fung
- The Romantic Swordsman (1978) - Mr. Iron Flute
- Vanity Fair (1978)
- Chor Lau-heung (1979) - Ko Koonying
- Demi-Gods and Semi-Devils (1982) - Moyun Bok
- The Legend of the Condor Heroes (1982) - Luk Shing-fung
- The New Adventures of Chor Lau-heung (1984) - Sit Yiyen
- The Duke of Mount Deer (1984) - Oh Bai
- The Smiling, Proud Wanderer (1984) - Lam Chan-nam
- Heir to the Throne Is... (1986) - Ching Ho
- New Heavenly Sword and Dragon Sabre (1986) - Wu Ching-ngau
- The Legend of the Book and the Sword (1987) - Yuen See-siu
- Twilight of a Nation (1988) - Mr. Sze
- Deadly Secret (1989) - Ling Tui-see
- Looking Back in Anger (1989) - Ngai Kwun
- Ode to Gallantry (1989) - Pak Tsi-tsoi
- Big Family (1991)
- The Mystery of the Condor Hero (1993) - Yan Po-pai
- Man of Wisdom (1993)
- The Edge of Righteousness (1993)
- Conscience (1994)
- Mystery of the Sabre (1994)
- Man of Wisdom II (1995)
- Plain Love (1995) - Kwan Hok Jyu
- A Kindred Spirit (1995-1999) - Leung Yao
- From Act to Act (1995)
- Cold Blood Warm Heart (1996)
- The File of Justice V (1997)
- A Recipe for the Heart (1997) - Keung Yin
- The Duke of Mount Deer (1998) - Chan Man-leung, Chan Kwong
- The Green Hope (2000) - Yu Chin-sau
- In the Realm of Success (2001)
