= Jenny Tseng =

Macanese singer (born 1953)

- 甄妮
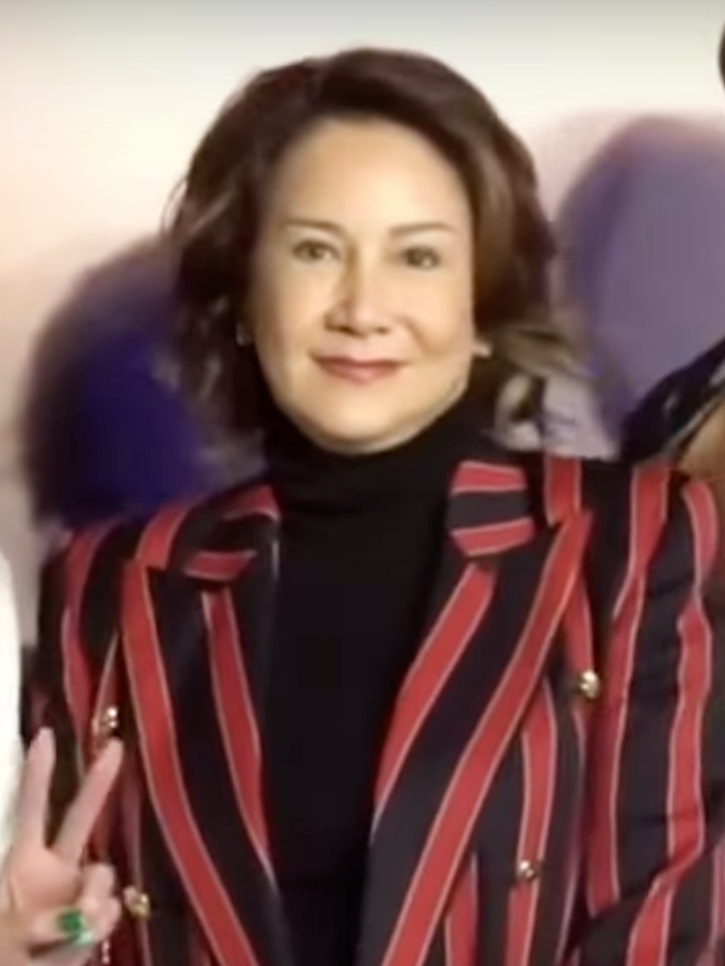
- Tseng in 2024
- Born: Yan Suk Si (甄淑詩); 20 February 1953 (age 73); Portuguese Macau
- Occupation: Singer
- Years active: 1971–present
- Spouse: Alexander Fu Sheng (m. 1976; died 1983)
- Children: Melody Tseng (daughter)
- Musical career
- Genres: Cantopop, Mandopop
- Labels: SonyBMG; JenFu Records

Chinese name
- Traditional Chinese: 甄妮
Transcriptions
Standard Mandarin
- Hanyu Pinyin: Zhēn Nī
- Wade–Giles: Chen Ni
Yue: Cantonese
- Jyutping: Jan1 Nei4
- Hong Kong Romanisation: Yan Nei

Yan Suk Si
- Traditional Chinese: 甄淑詩
- Simplified Chinese: 甄淑诗
Transcriptions
Standard Mandarin
- Hanyu Pinyin: Zhēn Shūshī
Yue: Cantonese
- Jyutping: Jan1 Suk6si1
- Macau Romanization: Yan Suk Si

Jenny Tseng (Chinese: 甄妮, Yan Nei; born Yan Suk Si (simplified Chinese: 甄淑诗; traditional Chinese: 甄淑詩; pinyin: Zhēn shū shī); 20 February 1953) is a Macanese singer. She has been based in Taiwan and Hong Kong for much of her career.

== Career ==
=== Collaboration with Roman Tam ===
In 1983 Jenny and Roman Tam issued the soundtrack to the hit Hong Kong TV series Legend of the Condor Heroes. The Cantonese songs became instant hits with classics including: Iron-blooded Loyalists (鐵血丹心) and 世間始終你好. “When the series was broadcasted (broadcast) in late 1980s in the mainland China, the tune Iron-blooded Loyalists became widely popular, and had since been regarded as one of the classics in Chinese pop music”.

== Personal life ==
She married kung fu movie star Alexander Fu Sheng in 1976, after having appeared with him in the film The New Shaolin Boxers (1976). Her husband died in a car accident in 1983. In 1987, Tseng gave birth to her daughter, Melody Tseng, which led to speculation regarding the father's identity. In 2012, Tseng revealed that her daughter was conceived through artificial insemination using the stored sperm of her late husband.

== Awards won ==
=== Hong Kong Gold Disc Award / IFPIHK Top Sales Award ===
==== Local Platinum Disc ====
1979: 奮鬥 (新興全音)

1981: 春雨彎刀; 祝福你 (新興全音)

1982: 心聲 (金音符)

1983: 數碼大碟 (金音符)

1985: 甄妮; 甄妮演唱會精選; 為你而歌 (CBS/新力)

1988: 甄妮 (華星)

==== Local Gold Disc ====
1981: 夢中的媽媽 (新興全音)

1982: 數碼大碟 (金音符)

1983: 播音人 (金音符)

=== RTHK Top Ten Chinese Gold Songs Award ===
1972–1982: 每年的金骆驼

1978: 明日话今天 (The Female Artist of the Year award did not exist at this time)

1979: 春雨弯刀

1981: 東方之珠;Most Popular Female Singer of the year

1983: 世間始終你好

1984: 再度孤獨

1986: 海上花

2011: Golden Needle Award (金針獎)

=== Jade Solid Gold Best Ten Music Awards Presentation ===
1984: 再度孤獨; 無敵是愛 with Sam Hui; The Most Popular Female Artist Award (最受歡迎女歌星獎)

=== Golden Bell Awards ===
1981: Best female singer

== See also ==
- Chien Yao
- Coco Lee
- The Dull Ice Flower

Preceded by Teresa Teng	Golden Bell Awards 金鐘獎 Best female singer 1981	Succeeded by Fong Fei-fei
