= Calvin (given name) =

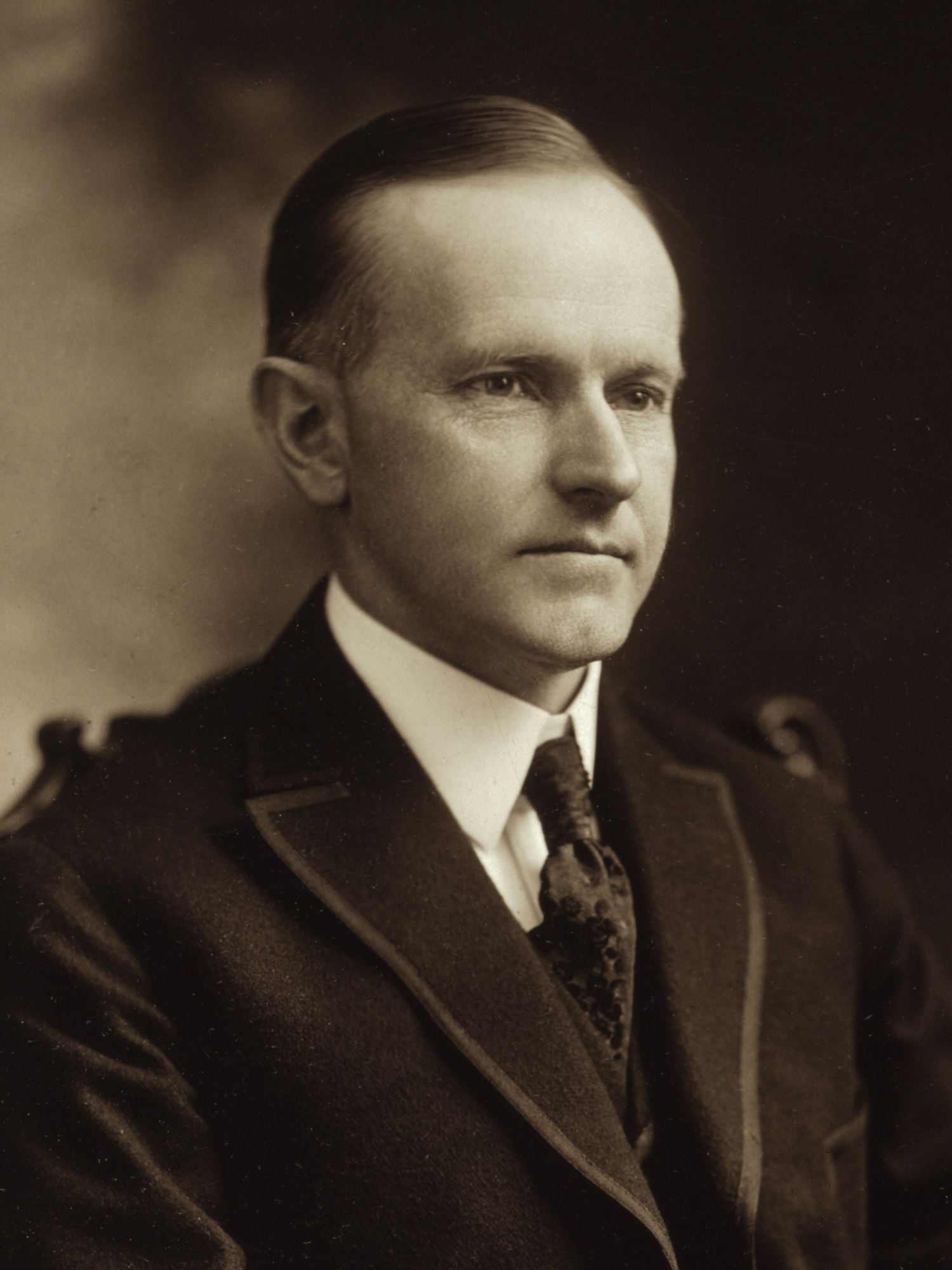
- Calvin Coolidge
- Pronunciation: /ˈkælvɪn/ KAL-vin
- Gender: Male

Origin
- Origin: surname of John Calvin

Other names
- Variant form: Kalvin
- Nicknames: Cal, Callie, Cally
- Related names: Kelvin

Calvin is a masculine given name. It derives ultimately from Latin calvus ("bald") and the suffix -īnus, at least usually via the French descendants of these words. It has been particularly popular among French Protestants, who may be baptized as John Calvin, theologian, Protestant reformer and proponent of Calvinism, although in the judgement of the Oxford Dictionary of First Names, the modern given name "owes its popularity as much to the New York fashion designer Calvin Klein [b. 1942] as to the theologian".

Notable people with this name include:

- Calvin Abrams (1924–1997), American baseball player
- Calvin Abueva (born 1988), Filipino basketball player
- Calvin Anderson (born 1996), American football player
- Calvin Andrew (born 1986), English footballer
- Calvin Ashford (c. 1965–2008), African-American interior designer
- Calvin Austin (born 1999), American football player
- Calvin Ayre (born 1961), Canadian-Antiguan entrepreneur
- Calvin Benham Baldwin (1902–1975), American politician
- Calvin Bassey (born 1999), Nigerian footballer
- Calvin Beaulier, American politician
- Calvin Borel (born 1966), American jockey
- Calvin Brent (1854–1899), American architect
- Calvin S. Brice (1845–1898), American politician
- Calvin Bridges (1889–1938), American scientist
- Calvin Broadus, stage name Snoop Dogg (born 1971), American rapper
- Calvin Brock (born 1975), American boxer
- Calvin Burnett, multiple people
- Calvin Case (1847– 1923), American orthodontist
- Calvin Chen (born 1980), Taiwanese actor, model, singer and TV presenter
- Calvin Cheng (born 1975), Singaporean politician
- Calvin Galusha Coolidge (1815–1878), grandfather of U.S. president Calvin Coolidge
- Calvin Coolidge (1872–1933), 30th President of the United States (born John Calvin Coolidge Jr.)
- Calvin Dean (born 1985), British actor
- Calvin Demba, English actor, writer and director
- Calvin Faucher (born 1995), American baseball player
- Calvin Fixx (1906–1950), American journalist
- Calvin Gotlieb (1921–2016), Canadian professor
- Calvin Goddard (1768–1842), American politician
- Calvin Hooker Goddard (1891–1955), American forensic scientist
- Calvin Griffith (1911–1999), American baseball team owner
- Calvin S. Hall (1909–1985), American psychologist
- Calvin Harris (born 1984), Scottish DJ
- Calvin Hill (born 1947), American football player
- Calvin Hoffman (1938–1984), American theatre critic, press agent, and conspiracy theorist
- Calvin Hunt, multiple people
- Calvin Jackson, multiple people
- Calvin Johnson (born 1962), American musician
- Calvin Johnson (born 1985), American football player
- Calvin Jones, multiple people
- Calvin Kattar (born 1988), American mixed martial artist
- Calvin Lee (born 1983), Hong Kong archer
- Calvin Lo, Hong Kong businessman and chief executive officer
- Calvin Lockhart (1934–2007), Bahamian-American actor
- Calvin Mackie (born 1967 or 1968), American motivational speaker and entrepreneur
- Calvin "C. J." Miles, Jr. (born 1987), American basketball player
- Calvin Miller (born 1996), American runner
- Calvin Miller (born 1998), Scottish footballer
- Calvin Munson (born 1994), American football player
- Calvin Murphy (born 1948), American basketball player
- Calvin Nash (born 1997), Irish rugby union player
- Calvin Newborn (1933–2018), American jazz guitarist
- Calvin Oftana (born 1996), Filipino basketball player
- Calvin Peach (born 1952), Canadian politician
- Calvin Peete (1943–2015), American professional golfer
- Calvin Petrie (born 1984), Montserratian international footballer and mixed martial arts (MMA) fighter
- Calvin Pickard (born 1992), Canadian ice hockey player
- Calvin Pryor (born 1992), American football player
- Calvin Raatsie (born 2002), Dutch footballer
- Calvin Ramsay (born 2003), Scottish footballer
- Calvin Richardson (born 1976), American singer-songwriter
- Calvin Ridley (born 1994), American football player
- Calvin Ripken, Jr. (born 1960), American baseball player
- Calvin Ripken, Sr. (1935–1999), American baseball player
- Calvin Robinson (born 1985), British political commentator and clergyman
- Calvin Ross (born c. 1945), American law enforcement officer
- Calvin Royal III (born 1988/89), American ballet dancer
- Calvin Russell (born 1983), American football player
- Calvin Russell (1948–2011), American singer-songwriter and guitarist
- Calvin Rutstrum (1895–1982), American author
- Calvin Schrage (born 1991), American politician
- Calvin Simmons (1950–1982), American conductor
- Calvin Simon (1942–2022), American musician
- Calvin Smith (born 1961), American sprint track and field athlete
- Calvin Stengs (born 1998), Dutch footballer
- Calvin Sun (born 1986), American physician
- Calvin Tankman (born 1994), American professional wrestler
- Calvin B. Taylor (1857–1932), American banker, lawyer, educator and politician
- Calvin Howard Taylor (1896–19??), Canadian politician
- Calvin Thomas (1854–1919), American scholar
- Calvin Throckmorton (born 1996), American football player
- Calvin Tomkins (born 1925), American author and art critic
- Calvin Trillin (born 1935), American writer
- Calvin Twigt (born 2003), Dutch footballer
- Calvin Verdonk (born 1997), Indonesian footballer
- Calvin Vlaanderen (born 1996), South African-Dutch motocross racer
- Calvin Vollrath (born 1960), Canadian Métis fiddler
- Calvin Wooster (1771–1798), American circuit rider
- Calvin Zola (born 1984), Congolese footballer

== Fictional characters ==
- Calvin (Calvin and Hobbes), a main character of the retired comic strip Calvin and Hobbes
- Calvin Maxwell, one of the protagonists in Power Rangers Ninja Steel
- Calvin T. Burnside, main character from American animated sitcom, Calvin and the Colonel
- Calvin Valentine, a character in the soap opera Hollyoaks
- Calvin Zabo, Mister Hyde, supervillain in Marvel Comics
