= List of Home Troopers characters =

Promotional poster

Home Troopers (Traditional Chinese: 居家兵團) is a 2010–11 Hong Kong television serial drama produced by TVB. The series follow the lives of the middle class Chukot family, who helps organize a housekeeping business in Hong Kong.

== Characters ==
=== Chukot family ===
Cast	Role	Description
Ha Yu	Chukot Ho 諸葛河	60 years old A retired civil servant (Ex-technician); Ka-ka's husband Joseph, Karen, Danny, and Benny's father Wah Jing-lek's love interest
Liza Wang	Lai Ka-ka 黎嘉嘉	55 years old Ho's wife Joseph, Karen, Danny, and Benny's mother
Kevin Cheng	Chukot Ching, Joseph 諸葛靖	35 years old Co-owner of Master Home Services Company, later co-owner of King of Home Services Company; Former HR manager in a real estate company Ho and Ka-ka's eldest son Fred's friend Tung Kam-po's boyfriend, later husband
Mandy Wong	Chukot Yung, Karen 諸葛蓉	29 years old A Chinese high school teacher Ho and Ka-ka's second daughter
Adrian Chau	Chukot Kiu, Benny 諸葛喬	19 years old A first year Biology university student Ho and Ka-ka's third son Danny's older twin brother Kimi's boyfriend.
Daniel Chau	Chukot Fung, Danny 諸葛峰	19 years old A Form 7 repeated student An ice-cream hawker Ho and Ka-ka's youngest son Benny's younger twin brother Michelle's boyfriend.

=== Master Home Services Company ===
Cast	Role	Description
Kevin Cheng	Chukot Jing, Joseph 諸葛靖	Co-owner
Raymond Cho	Kei Wing-fat, Fred 祈永發	35 years old Co-owner; Joseph's friend Bowie's ex-boyfriend (Villain)
Bernice Liu	Tung Kam-po (Kam) 童金寶	29 years old Secretary and housework assistant Former restaurant hostess Tung Chi's daughter
Liza Wang	Lai Ka-ka 黎嘉嘉	Housework assistant
Angela Tong	Wah Jing-lek, Janet 華晶叻	38 years old Thai chinese Housing assistant and doula Lai Ka-ka's apprentice Loved Chukot Ho
Peter Lai	Tung Chi 童志	A locksmith Kam's father

=== Other characters ===
Cast	Role	Description
Christine Kuo	Kwai Sin-yau, Michelle 季羡悠	25 years old A university English teaching assistant Master Home Services' client Danny's love interest, later girlfriend
Vincent Wong	Tong Sau-lai, Leo 唐守禮	29 years old A doctor Leung Man-tai's grandson Kiki's husband Karen's ex-boyfriend, later lover, finally broke up in Episode 19
Timmy Hung	Cheung Lok-tin 張樂天	32 years old A physical education teacher Chukot Yung's colleague Loved Chukot Yung, later her boyfriend
Claire Yiu	Sung Tsz-kei, Kiki 宋子淇	Leo's wife Master Home Services' client Gave birth to a baby girl in Episode 11; Framed Chukot Yung; Disfigured after protecting Leo from sulfuric acid attack in Episode 19 (Semi-villain)
Raymond Tsang	Ar Kwong 阿廣	Crystal's ex-husband Abused Crystal (Villain)
Teresa Ha	Leung Man-tai 梁文涕	Leo's grandmother
Kirby Lam	Kimi	Chokot Kiu's classmate, later girlfriend

== See also ==
- Home Troopers
