= Calvin Miller (disambiguation) =

Calvin Miller may refer to:

- Calvin Miller (born 1998), Scottish footballer
- Calvin Miller (gridiron football) (born 1953), American football player
- Calvin Miller (runner) (born 1996), American runner
- Calvin M. Miller (born 1924), American academic
