= Vin (given name) =

Male given name

- Gender: Male

Other names
- Related names: Vincent, Devin, Calvin

Vin is a masculine given name, usually a short form for Vincent, Calvin, Devin, Gavin, Marvin, Melvin, Alvin, Ervin, Elvin, among other names with the word "Vin" in them.

== Given name ==
- Vin Baker (born 1971), American basketball player
- Vin Baker (golfer) (died 1990), South African golfer
- Vin Baston (1919–1963), Irish hurler
- Vin Brown (1922–1989), Australian rules footballer
- Vin Campbell (1888–1969), American baseball player
- Vin Coutie (1881–1951), Australian rules footballer
- Vin Di Bona (born 1944), American television producer
- Vin Garbutt (born 1947), English folk singer and songwriter
- Vin Gardiner (1885–1972), Australian rules footballer
- Vin Heffernan (1935–2002), Australian politician
- Vin Mazzaro (born 1986), American baseball pitcher
- Vin Sabbatucci (1935–2007), Australian rules footballer
- Vin Scelsa (born 1947), American radio personality
- Vin Scully (1927–2022), American sportscaster
- Vin Sullivan (1911–1999), American comic book editor, artist and publisher
- Vin Waite (1949–2003), Australian rules footballer
- Vin Weber (born 1952), American politician

== Nickname ==
- Vin Diesel (born July 18, 1967), stage name of American actor Mark Sinclair

== Fictional characters ==
- Vin Makazian, a character on The Sopranos, played by John Heard
