= Luk Siu-fung =

1976 Hong Kong TV series

- VCD cover art
- 陸小鳳
- Genre: Wuxia
- Based on: Lu Xiaofeng Series by Gu Long
- Directed by: Wong Tin-lam
- Starring: Damian Lau; Wong Wan-choi; Wong Yuen-sun; Adam Cheng; Wong Hang-sau
- Theme music composer: Joseph Koo
- Opening theme: "Luk Siu-fung" (陸小鳳) by Adam Cheng; "Vow to Enter a Mountain of Knives" (誓要入刀山) by Adam Cheng
- Country of origin: Hong Kong
- Original language: Cantonese
- No. of seasons: 3
- No. of episodes: 30

Production
- Producer: Wong Tin-lam
- Production location: Hong Kong
- Running time: ≈ 40 minutes per episode
- Production company: TVB

Original release
- Network: TVB
- Release: 1976

Luk Siu-fung (陸小鳳) is a Hong Kong wuxia television series adapted from the Lu Xiaofeng Series by Gu Long. It was first broadcast on TVB in Hong Kong in 1976. The 30 episodes long series is divided into three seasons, each with 10 episodes: Mystery of the Golden Bird (金鵬之迷); Before and After the Duel (決戰前後); and The Battle of Wudang (武當之戰).

== Cast ==
- Damian Lau as Lu Xiaofeng
- Wong Wan-choi as Hua Manlou
- Wong Yuen-sun as Ximen Chuixue
- Ma Kim-tong as Sikong Zhaixing
- Adam Cheng as Ye Gucheng
- Wong Hang-sau as Sun Xiuqing
- Kwan Hoi-san as Dugu Yihe / Li Yanbei
- Ho Ka-wai as Shi Xiuyun
- Ko Miu-see as Ma Xiuzhen
- Chan Fuk-sang as Ye Xiuzhu
- Mary Hon as Shangguan Feiyan / Shangguan Danfeng
- Chong Man-ching as Shangguan Xue'er
- Ng Tung as Huo Xiu / Shangguan Mu
- Kwan Chung as Huo Tianqing
- Kam Hing-hin as Liu Yuhen
- Lok Kung as the King
- Kong To as Zhu Ting
- Ching Ho-wai as Zhu Ting's wife
- Ho Kwong-lun as Gouhunshou
- Lau Kok-sing as Tiemian Panguan
- Tsui Kwong-lam as Dugu Fang
- Leung Hon-fai as Xiao Qiuyu
- Bak Man-biu as Ma Xingkong
- Kong Ngai as Yan Tieshan / Yan Liben
- Law Ho-kai as Su Shaoying / Yan Renying
- Wong Sun as Qingfeng
- Chow Kit as Fan E
- Chan Ling-wai as Cui Yidong

== Music ==
=== From parts 1 & 2 ===
Luk Siu-Fung is also the title of an album released by Crown Records in 1976. Adam Cheng recorded most of the songs while Teresa Cheung sang tracks 3, 5 and 6. Side one contains theme songs from the Luk Siu-fung television series. Side two is unrelated to the television series except the final track.

"Yuen kwan saam gei cheui" (願君心記取) was one of the top ten songs awarded by RTHK in the 1978 awards

All lyrics are written by Lo Kwok-Jim except track 4 by Yip Shiu-Tak; all music is composed by Joseph Koo.

Side one
No.	Title	Unofficial translation	Length
1.	"陸小鳳" (Main theme)	Luk Siu-fung / Lu Xiaofeng
2.	"決戰前夕" (kuet jin chin jik; Sub-theme)	The Day Before the Decisive Battle
3.	"鮮花滿月樓" (sin faa moon yuet lau; Sub-theme)	A Storied Building's Fresh Flowers in the Full Moon
4.	"悼薛冰" (dou sit bing; Sub-theme)	Grieving at the Cold Marsh
5.	"願君心記取" (yuen kwan sam gei cheui; Sub-theme)	Wishing Your Heart Remembers to Choose
6.	"落花淚影" (lok faa leui ying; Sub-theme)	Fallen Tears

All tracks are written by various persons below.

Side two
No.	Title	Lyrics	Music	Unofficial translation	Length
7.	"大報復" (Theme song of The Great Vendetta)	Lo Kwok-Jim	Joseph Koo	The Great Vendetta
8.	"悲歌訴心聲" (bei go sou saam sing)	Yip Shiu-Tak	—	A Sad Song Tells Feelings
9.	"文秋郎" (maan chau long)	Peter Lai	—	Autumn Gentleman
10.	"彈劍江湖" (taan kim kong woo)	Yip Shiu-Tak	Wong Yuet-Sang	Saber-Flicking Wanderer / Flicking a Sword in Waters
11.	"初戀" (chor loon)	Lo Kwok-Jim	Joseph Koo	First Love
12.	"陸小鳳音樂"		Joseph Koo	Luk Siu-Fung (instrumental)

=== From Season 3 ===
These songs are heard in part three of the television series. They are sung by Adam Cheng, were written by James Wong, and composed by Joseph Koo. They are also available in the 1978 album The Heaven Sword and Dragon Saber (倚天屠龍記).

- Main theme: "Pledge to Join the War" (誓要入刀山)
  One of the top ten "gold songs" awarded by RTHK
- Sub-theme: "Unfulfilled Sentiments" (情未了)
