= Damian Lau =

Hong Kong actor

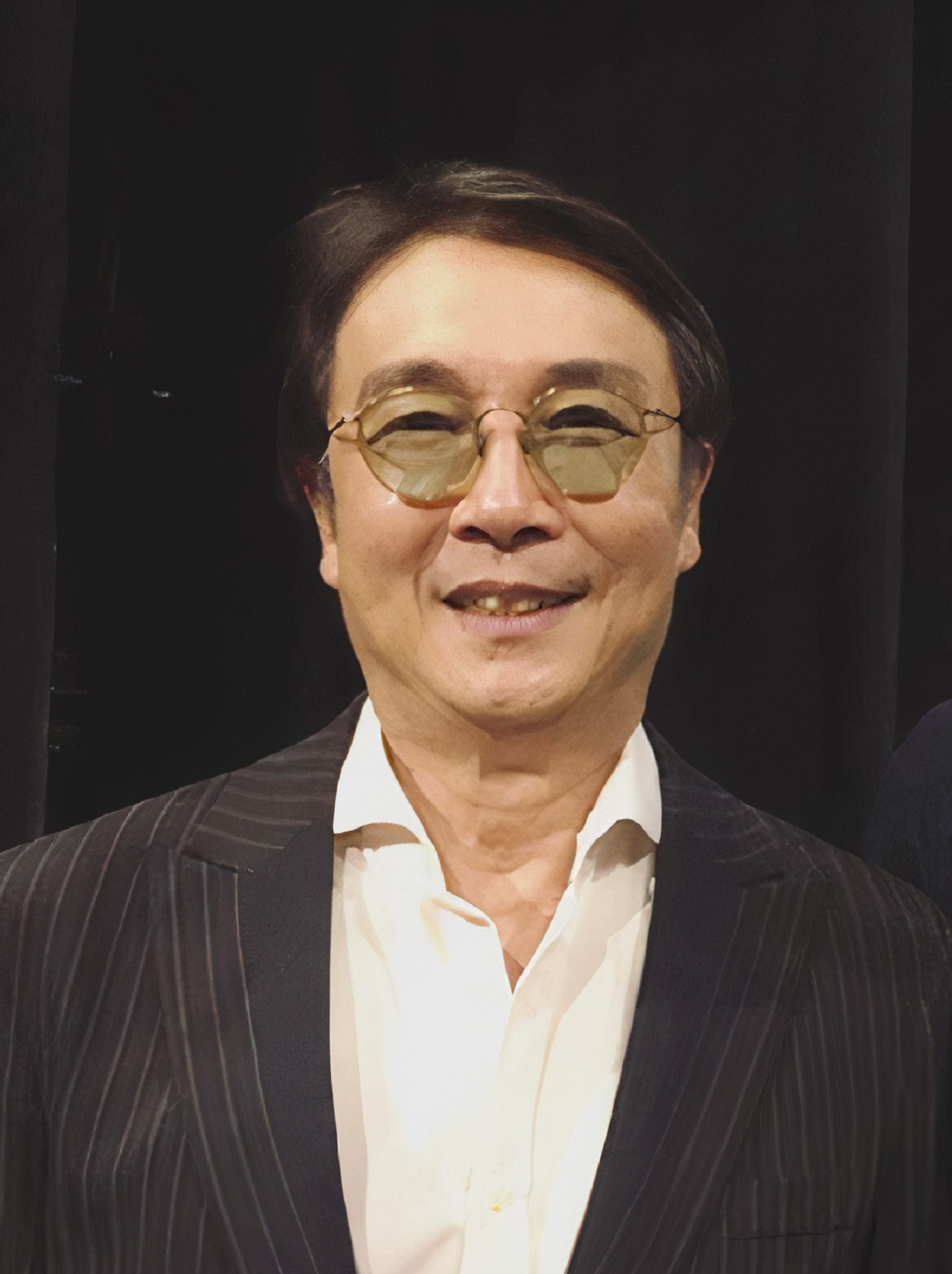
- Lau in 2015
- Born: 14 October 1949 (age 76); Hong Kong
- Occupations: Actor; executive producer; film director
- Years active: 1971–present
- Awards: TVB Anniversary Awards – All-Time Most Memorable Male Leading Roles; 1999 Luk Siu Fung

Chinese name
- Traditional Chinese: 劉松仁
- Simplified Chinese: 刘松仁
Transcriptions
Standard Mandarin
- Hanyu Pinyin: Liú Sōngrén
Yue: Cantonese
- Jyutping: Lau4 Cung4jan4
- Musical career
- Also known as: Chung-tsai (松仔)
- Website: lauchungyan.com

Damian Lau Chung-yan (born 14 October 1949) is a Hong Kong film and television actor, executive producer and film director. Lau has starred in many television drama series of various genres, produced by Hong Kong's TVB and ATV.

== Biography ==
=== Early career ===
Lau enrolled into the actors' training class of RTV (now ATV) in 1971, where he started his early acting career. In 1976, he joined TVB on a contract and began to gain recognition for acting in television drama series produced by the TV station. In 1976, Lau rose to fame for his portrayal of the titular character in Luk Siu-fung, an adaptation of Wuxia writer Gu Long's novel series of the same title. His performance in Yesterday's Glitter also made him famous.

=== Partnership with Michelle Yim ===
Lau returned to ATV in 1980. He worked with Michelle Yim, as the male and female leading actor/actress respectively, in a number of TV series in the 1980s, including Fatherland, Chronicles of the Shadow Swordsman and Rise of the Great Wall.

=== Film career ===
Following the rise in popularity of Hong Kong cinema in the 1980s and 1990s, Lau also started working on films in addition to television series. He was often cast as a typical silent, handsome, heroic swordsman in many Wuxia films of the 1980s and 1990s. One of his first major roles was in John Woo's Last Hurrah for Chivalry (1979), in which he played an assassin. In Duel to the Death, Lau's character faced Norman Chui‘s character in a final duel, said to be one of the best sword duels ever in Wuxia film history.

In 2006, Lau starred in The Tokyo Trial, a highly controversial film that was nominated at the Cannes Film Festival and won the 2007 Golden Rooster Awards for Best Screenplay. In the film, Lau played the historic judge Mei Ju-ao, who was able to convince ten other national judges to prosecute Japanese war criminals for their crimes against peace and humanity. The film also saw Lau delivering most of his lines in English for the first time in his acting career.

When interviewed about his role as Mei Ju-ao, Lau said,

"Mei Ju-ao is a person with a strong sense of ethics and national pride. He represented his country at a significant international affair. He had to shoulder great responsibility as well as a lot of pressure. If he did not harbor strong emotions and a patriotic heart within his bosom, he could hardly successfully overcome the many difficulties before him and fulfill the mission given by the country. He was cool-headed and witty throughout the trial. I tried to master his inner world through these aspects. I really respect him."

=== Return to TVB ===
Lau returned to TVB in 1992 and achieved success for his performance in The Greed of Man, in which he played an honest and cultured leader of the Hong Kong Stock Exchange, who was later murdered by his childhood friend, Ting Hai (played by Adam Cheng), over a love rivalry.

In 2003, Lau starred as Chow Ming-hin in the family drama Point of No Return. The following year, Lau worked on Hard Fate, a controversial TV series that received many complaints from viewers for its suicide scenes. In the series, Lau played Leung Pak-yin, an originally morally upright and ambitious company boss who became a desperate, deranged and almost insane man after experiencing many fateful incidents. In 2007, Lau played a family patriarch in The Drive of Life, a 60 episodes grand production by TVB and mainland China's CCTV.

== Personal life ==
In the 1990s, Lau married a flight attendant from Cathay Pacific, whom he met earlier on a flight to Canada. Lau is also a devout Catholic.

== Filmography ==
=== Films ===
Year	Title	Role	Notes/Ref.
1979	Last Hurrah for Chivalry	Tsing Yi / Greeno	
1980	The Enigmatic Case	Lo Tin-kwan	
1980	Beidou Xing		director and actor
1983	Zu Warriors from the Magic Mountain	Abbot Hsiao-yu	
1983	Duel to the Death	Ching-wan	
1984	Profile in Anger	Wong Kin-hang	
1986	The Brave and the Coward		director
1988	School on Fire	Wan	
1990	The Story of My Son	Li Tzu-liang	
1991	Inspector Pink Dragon	Teng Kuo-chiao	
1992	The Thief of Time		
1992	Shanghai Heroic Story	Ngai Ting-yim	
1992	She Starts the Fire		cameo
1992	Royal Tramp	Chan Kan-nam	
1992	Royal Tramp 2	Chan Kan-nam	
1993	Murder	Yau Lung	
1993	Holy Weapon	Mo Kake "Heaven's Sword"	
1993	The Magic Crane	Yat Yeung-tze	
1993	Executioners	Inspector Lau	
1993	The Heroic Trio	Inspector Lau	
1994	Tian Di	Tai Chai-man	
1994	What Price Survival / One Armed Swordsman	Wu An-kuo	
1994	The New Legend of Shaolin	Chan Kan-nam	
1994	Urban Cop		executive producer
1995	My Father Is a Hero	Yat-wah's boss	
1995	Sea Eagles	Liu Qingzong	
1996	Best of the Best	Calvin Chan Lik-yeung	
1996	First Option	Senior Superintendent Lau	
1996	Ah Kam	Lawyer	
1997	Lifeline	Cheng Fu-shing	
1997	Till Death Do Us Part		
2005	New Born Living Strong	Professor Vincent Yu	
2006	The Tokyo Trial	Mei Ju-ao	Nominated – Golden Rooster Awards for Best Actor
2008	Three Kingdoms: Resurrection of the Dragon	Cao Cao	cameo
2010	14 Blades	Zhao Shenyan	guest star

=== Television series ===
Year	Title	Role	Notes
1976	Luk Siu-fung I: Mystery of the Golden Bird	Luk Siu-fung	
1976	Luk Siu-fung II: Before and After the Duel	Luk Siu-fung	
1976	Luk Siu-fung III: The Battle of Wudang	Luk Siu-fung	
1976	Bansheng Yuan	Cheung Yue-kan	
1977	The Butterfly Lovers	Leung San-bak	
1978	Da Heng	Chu Lok-man	
1978	Vanity Fair		
1979	Princess Cheung Ping	Chow Sai-hin	
1979	God of Sabre	Ding Pang	
1980	This Land is Mine		
1980	Yesterday's Glitter	Kam Jan-sai	
1983	Swordsman Li Bai	Li Bai	
1984	Dadi Enqing Zhi Gudu Jinglei	Chow Kai-wah	
1985	Chronicles of the Shadow Swordsman	Zhang Dan-fung	
1986	Hero of the Time	Yuen Tsang-lok	
1986	Rise of the Great Wall	King Or	
1986	Condor in September	Yip Hoi	
1987	Return the Pearl to Thee	Chun Tin-bo	
1988	August Scent	Wu Suet-yim	
1988	Lay and Order	Ai Bok-man	
1989	Spring Comes and Goes	Cheung Loi-fuk	
1989	安乐茶饭 Anle Tea		
1990	Lovers at the End of an Era	Tung Sing-fan	
1991	Bihai Qingtian	Tin Yang	
1991	Jianghu Zaijian	Chow Sing-lung	
1992	The Thief of Time		
1992	The Greed of Man	Fong Chun-sun	
1994	The Great General	Dik Ching	
1994	ICAC Investigators 1994	Lee Tin	
1994	The Chevaliers	Zhan Zhao	
1995	The Unexpected	Cheung Wai-chung	
1996	Women's Story	Kwan King-sang	
1996	The Swordsman	Yin Buk-fei / Yin Ku-hung	
1996	King of Gamblers	Li Yik	
1997	Interpol	Wong Ho-sui	
1998	Wen Yi Duo	Wen Yiduo	
1999	Silver Rat		
1999	Bond of Friendship	Zhuang Xueren	
2000	ICAC Investigators 2000	Lee Tin	
2000	Monk at Thirty	Lin Chong	
2000	The Immortal Fugitive	Rong Renjie	
2000	The Heaven Sword and Dragon Saber	Cheung Tsui-san	
2000	Ups and Downs	Hong Dalong	
2001	The Awakening Story	Suen Hok-kei	
2001	To Where He Belongs	Ko Hou-wan	
2003	Scent of Love	Jin Zhizhong	
2003	Point of No Return	Chow Ming-hin	Won – Astro Award for My Favourite On-screen Father; Nominated – Astro Award for Best Actor (Top 10); Nominated – Astro Award for My Favourite Character (Top 20)
2003	Find the Light	Chan Do-yeung	
2003	True Love	Fok Wai-pong	
2004	Only You	Wang Haoran	
2004	Hard Fate	Leung Pak-yin	
2005	The Royal Swordsmen	Tiedan Shenhou	
2006	The Conquest	King Goujian of Yue	Ming Pao Magazine Best Actor award for TV series (2007)
2006	Men in Pain	Hong Tin-yam	Nominated – TVB Award for Best Actor; Nominated – TVB Award for My Favourite Male Character; Nominated – Astro Award for My Favourite On-screen Look (Top 5)
2006	Eight Heroes	Guan Yulou	
2007	The Drive of Life	Wah Man-hon	Nominated – TVB Award for Best Actor; Nominated – TVB Award for My Favourite Male Character; Nominated – Astro Award for Best Actor (Top 5); Nominated – Astro Award for My Favourite Character (Top 20)
2008	Catch Me Now	Ko Chit, Jack	Nominated – TVB Award for Best Actor
2008	Rose Martial World	Jun Wuji	
2009	In the Chamber of Bliss	Choi Ock	Nominated – TVB Award for Best Actor
2010	Growing Through Life	Hai Liang	Nominated – TVB Award for Best Actor
2010	A Weaver on the Horizon	Feng Jiujin	
2011	The Rippling Blossom	Moyung Ching	
2011	Lives of Omission	Kung Ka-pui	Nominated – My AOD Favourite Award for Best Supporting Actor (Top 5); Nominated - TVB Anniversary Award for Best Supporting Actor
2011	Scarlet Heart	Kangxi Emperor	
2012	Silver Spoon, Sterling Shackles	Arthur Chung Cheuk-man	Nominated – TVB Anniversary Award for Best Actor (Top 5); Nominated – My AOD Favourite Award for Best Actor (Top 12); Nominated – My AOD Favourite Award for Top 15 Character
2015	Limelight Years	Ben Law	
2017	WuXin: The Monster Killer Season 2	Mr Su - Su Tao's father	Guest Star
2018	Infernal Affairs	Hu Guan You	Guest Star

=== MediaCorp TV Channel 8 series ===
Year	Drama	Role	Notes
2000	Dare To Strike	Li Dechao	Supporting Role
2015	The Dream Makers II	Zheng Shouyi	Supporting Role

== Major achievements ==
List of achievements
Year	Achievement	Representative work	Ref.
1999	All-Time Most Memorable Male Leading Roles, 1999 TVB Anniversary Awards	Luk Siu-fung	
2007	Best Actor, Ming Pao Magazine	The Conquest	
2007	Best Actor nomination, 2007 Golden Rooster Awards	The Tokyo Trial	
2007	Best Actor nomination, 29th Hundred Flowers Award	Tokyo Trial	

Awards and achievements
Power Academy Awards
Preceded by Roger Kwok for Life Made Simple	Outstanding Actor in Television; 2007 for The Conquest	Succeeded by Ha Yu for Moonlight Resonance
