= The Duel of the Century =

1981 Hong Kong film by Chor Yuen

- DVD cover art
- 陸小鳳之決戰前後
- Directed by: Chor Yuen
- Screenplay by: Chor Yuen
- Based on: Juezhan Qianhou by Gu Long
- Produced by: Mona Fong
- Starring: Elliot Ngok; Jason Pai; Tony Liu; Sun Chien; Ku Kuan-Chung; Linda Chu; Ching Li; Tang Ching; Helen Poon; Ai Fei; Wong Rong
- Cinematography: Wong Chit
- Edited by: Chiang Hsing-lung; Yu Siu-fung
- Music by: Eddie H. Wang
- Production company: Shaw Brothers Studio
- Distributed by: Shaw Brothers Studio
- Release date: 22 October 1981
- Running time: 94 minutes
- Country: Hong Kong
- Language: Mandarin

The Duel of the Century (陸小鳳之決戰前後) is a 1981 Hong Kong wuxia film adapted from the novel Juezhan Qianhou of the Lu Xiaofeng Series by Gu Long. The film was directed by Chor Yuen, produced by the Shaw Brothers Studio, and starred Tony Liu as Lu Xiaofeng.

== Synopsis ==
Renowned swordsman Ye Gucheng suddenly challenges his compatriot Ximen Chuixue to a duel to the death on the eve of the Mid-Autumn Festival. However for reasons unknown, Ximen has postponed it resulting in rumors that he might not be able to best Ye. This unusual series of events spurs the intrigue of several martial artists including Lu Xiaofeng, who summons his compatriots Hua Manlou, Monk Honest, Sikong Zhaixing, and Hermit Pine to uncover the true reason for the match. They consult Guisun Daye, a mysterious and seemingly all-knowing hermit, and Lu is directed to two gamblers, Du Tongxuan and Li Yanbei. When seeking out the latter, Lu saves him from a group of assailants sent by none other than Du. Li reveals that he and Du made a bet on Ye and Ximen's duel, with Li betting that Ximen will win on account Ye was recently poisoned. Lu meets Du at a brothel where he witnesses a fight between Ye and Yan Renying, the latter accusing him of murdering his martial arts senior, Zhang Renying. Ye denies this and leaves while Yan is unable to pursue him after his horse, still carrying Zhang’s body, is let loose. Lu learns that Ximen’s wife was the deceased man's martial arts junior and theorizes revenge as the motive behind the duel. Lu then narrowly escapes being assassinated by a mysterious elderly man in imperial robes, whom he later sees gifting Ye medicine for his sickly wife, Leng Qingqiu. Leng has heard rumors that only Ximen can cure Ye’s wound and requests Lu to acquire the antidote on her behalf. Ximen agrees to hand over the antidote and Lu realises he too does not know why Ye wishes to duel him and is also trying to uncover the truth (thus the real reason he postponed their match). Ye however, has disappeared by the time Lu returns to question him. Lu then learns that Li Yanbei has relinquished his bet to Kuo Chingfeng, the leader of the White Cloud sect and godchild of the chief imperial eunuch, Wang An. Kuo does not disclose any reason in taking up on Li’s bet, and Lu later witnesses him meet with the chief lama of the Holy Water Sect from Tibet. Wang An arrives and Lu realises he was the very man who attempted to assassinate him. When Kuo departs to talk in secrecy with a man called Gan Er Jiao, Lu recognizes him as the one who released Yan Renying’s horse. Lu later interrogates him, learning that the horse belonged to someone in the palace and that Gan had been paid to release it by someone called Pockmarks. Gan takes Lu to a gambling den to question Pockmarks but he is killed by Wang. Lu and Ximen begin to doubt whether it was really Ye who killed Zhang Renying, especially when Ximen reveals that a lama from the Holy Water Sect is also an excellent swordsman. Recalling the meeting, Lu suspects the chief eunuch Wang’s involvement. They set out to examine Zhang’s body hoping they can cast light on the technique used to kill him, thereby revealing the true killer.

Lu and Ximen are led to a crematorium where they are ambushed by lama disciples. Upon defeating them, they find and rescue a bound Yan Renying, who had been led there by Wang. They are able to examine Zhang’s wound whereupon Ximen determines it was indeed not Ye who killed him. Yan then hands over three wax figures he found on Zhang’s body which point to the identities of his true killers. They take the figures to be restored to the famous sculptor, Wax Man Zhang but he attacks them, whereupon they learn he was an imposter sent by Wang. They find and save the real Zhang bound nearby and he restores the figures, including one heavily resembling Ye Gucheng. A furious Yan rushes out to kill Ye. By the time Lu and Ximen manage to find him, they witness Ye kill him. Exasperated, Lu returns to Guisun Daye but Guisun is killed, the murderer again being Ye. Lu reluctantly believes Ye truly committed the murders but Hua Manlou contradicts this as the poison in his wound should have left him severely weakened and unable to move, let alone fight. Since Ye also met with the chief eunuch, Hua suspects Ye must hold intimate knowledge of some secret of the imperial court, one that is serious enough to have Wang kill anyone who would reveal it. Just as Lu mulls over where to locate Ye, his wife Leng arrives seeking help. Just as Hua predicted, Ye is bedridden and a relieved Lu applies the antidote to his wound. He raises the possibility that someone has been masquerading as Ye to ruin his reputation, but to his shock, Ye admits to being the true killer and urges Lu to not look into the matter until his duel with Ximen is over.

Lu is summoned by Ye one evening but he quickly finds it is an imposter sent to kill him for his prodding. When he reveals this to the real Ye however, Lu is attacked and incapacitated. Wang An, Kuo Chingfeng, and the imposter Ye then appear. Ye reveals he is grateful to them for helping his wife, whose illness he had been unable to cure, and as such, has agreed to lend them his services. Lu is taken prisoner in the White Cloud sect where he meets the bastard of the previous emperor and a Tibetan princess of the Holy Water Sect. The truth of the plot is revealed: Wang An plans to use Ye to assassinate the current emperor and install the illegitimate heir to the throne, whereupon imperial China will be absorbed into a part of Tibet. To lure all protection away from the emperor, the duel was arranged with Ximen, only it will be the imposter Ye he will be fighting while the real one assassinates the emperor. Ye, meanwhile, was kept oblivious to the plan to usurp the throne and has been led to believe his actions will result in the prosperity of his countrymen. When the duel between Ximen and the fake Ye takes place, Hua Manlou notices Lu’s absence and upon hearing Kuo Chingfeng is nearby, suspects he may be involved. He sends Sikong Zhaixing to locate and free the captive Lu, who rushes to the duel and unmasks the imposter Ye. Kuo has the imposter killed and flees while Lu confronts the real Ye at the emperor’s quarters, now surrounded by a slew of lama disciples. He reveals the eunuch’s ploy to overthrow the dynasty and turn it into a part of Tibet. As Lu explains, Kuo attempts to blindside him but is killed by Ye. Ximen arrives and defeats the lamas while imperial soldiers capture Wang An and the usurper. A furious and humiliated Ye kills them both and agrees to duel Ximen to the death as a means of preserving his honor. Ximen ultimately emerges the victor as Ye dies to his sword and is posthumously eulogized by Lu in a poem.

== Cast ==
- Elliot Ngok as Ximen Chuixue
- Jason Pai as Ye Gucheng
- Tony Liu as Lu Xiaofeng
- Sun Chien as Hua Manlou
- Ku Kuan-chung as Yan Renying
- Linda Chu as Ouyang Qing
- Ching Li as Leng Qingqiu
- Tang Ching as Chief Eunuch Wang An
- Helen Poon as Sun Xiuqing
- Ai Fei as Kuo Ching-feng
- Wong Rong as the Emperor
- Walter Tso as Monk Honest
- Lung Tin-sang as Sikong Zhaixing
- Shum Lo as Hermit Pine
- Cheung Ying as Imposter Wax Man Zhang
- Gam Biu as Wax Man Zhang
- Sek Gong as Imposter Ye Gucheng
- Ngai Fei as Gu Qingfeng
- Cheng Miu as Li Yanbei
- Yeung Chi-hing as Du Tongxuan
- Kwan Fung as Zhang Renying
- Lau Siu-kwan as the Usurper
- Lam Fai-wong as Gan Er Jiao
- Chan Ka-kei as Tang Tianrong
- Alan Chan as Monk Shengtong
- Yang Hsuing as Pockmarks
- Fung Ging-man as a dealer
- Kara Hui as Ye's handmaiden
- Yuen Wah as an imperial guard (also action director)
