= The Tokyo Trial (film) =

- Film poster
- Traditional Chinese: 東京審判
- Simplified Chinese: 东京审判
- Hanyu Pinyin: Dōngjīng Shěnpàn
- Directed by: Gao Qunshu
- Written by: Hu Kun; Tang Hao; Zhang Chi; Zhang Sitao
- Produced by: Wang Tianyun; Zheng Quangang
- Starring: Damian Lau; Ken Chu; Kelly Lin; Kenneth Tsang; Eric Tsang
- Cinematography: Zhang Xigui
- Music by: An Dong; Chen Yupeng
- Release date: September 1, 2006 (China)
- Running time: 111 minutes
- Languages: Chinese (Mandarin); English; Japanese

The Tokyo Trial (simplified Chinese: 东京审判; traditional Chinese: 東京審判; pinyin: Dōngjīng Shěnpàn) is a Chinese historical drama film released in 2006.

== Plot ==
This film was directed by Gao Qunshu and is about the International Military Tribunal for the Far East after Japan's surrender in World War II. The movie presents the trial from the point of view of the Chinese judge Mei Ju-ao.

The director and his crew spent more than a year doing research to finish the script, which is based on historical data. It cost 18 million yuan (2.25 million U.S. dollars). This film hired actors from 11 countries, including China, Hong Kong, Japan and other places, including actors such as Kenneth Tsang and Damian Lau. They recreated court scenes from the trial in Chinese, English and Japanese.

It was shown in cinemas and around 100 universities across China to mark the 75th anniversary of the start of Japan's invasion of China.

== Cast ==
- Damian Lau as Mei Ju-ao, a judge
- Ken Chu as Hsiao Nan
- Kelly Lin as Yoshiko Wada
- Kenneth Tsang as Xiang Zhejun
- Eric Tsang as Masato Wada
- Tse Kwan-Ho as Yuichi Kitano
- Ying Da as Ni Zhengyu
- John Henry Cox as Joseph B. Keenan
- Daniel Albert Ziskie as William Webb
- Koike Karashiji as Ichirō Kiyose
- Akira Hoshino as Hideki Tojo
- Sakae Koike as Kenji Doihara
- Natori Tsuramasashi as Iwane Matsui
- Shingo Hiramatsu as Seishirō Itagaki
- Usaburo Oshima as Ryūkichi Tanaka
- Mo Qi as Shūmei Ōkawa
- Bai Xueyun as Wada Eiko
- Guo Tao as Y.H. Ku
- Li Yusheng as Puyi
- Zhu Hongjia as Kao Wen-pin

== Release ==
In 2006, the film was released in China. On February 1, 2007, the film was released in Hong Kong.

== Reception ==
According to People's Daily, "Ten days after its debut on September 1, the film about the trial of Japanese war criminals had racked up 10 million yuan (1.25 million U.S. dollars) at the box office, despite competition from Hollywood blockbuster X-Men: The Last Stand."

== See also ==
- Japanese war crimes
- Nanking Massacre
- Nanking (2007 film)
