= Lu Xiaofeng =

Fictional protagonist of a wuxia novel series by Gu Long

- Lu Xiaofeng Series character
- Created by: Gu Long

In-universe information
- Nickname: "Four Eyebrows"
- Gender: Male

Lu Xiaofeng

Chinese name
- Traditional Chinese: 陸小鳳
- Simplified Chinese: 陆小凤
Transcriptions
Standard Mandarin
- Hanyu Pinyin: Lù Xiǎofèng
Yue: Cantonese
- Jyutping: Luk^{6} Siu^{2}-fung^{6}

Vietnamese name
- Vietnamese: Lục Tiểu Phụng

Lu Xiaofeng (陸小鳳) is the fictional protagonist of the wuxia novel series Lu Xiaofeng Series by Gu Long. He has been portrayed in numerous films and television series adapted from the novels by notable actors such as Damian Lau, Tony Liu, Alex Man, Nick Cheung, Jimmy Lin, Julian Cheung and Gong Jun.

== Character description ==
Lu Xiaofeng is described as a charming man with a moustache that resembles his eyebrows. Although he is known throughout the jianghu (martial artists' community) for being an alcoholic, flirt, and regular patron of brothels, his unsavoury reputation is a disguise for his true personality. He is not only well-versed in martial arts, but also highly intelligent, witty and observant. These traits have helped him escape from danger and turn the tables on his enemies unexpectedly when he is apparently on the losing end. Besides, Lu Xiaofeng values friendship and often risks his life to help his friends when necessary.

Lu Xiaofeng is best known for his signature skill, the Lingxi Finger (靈犀一指), which allows him to catch and hold items, including sharp blades, between his fingers. He does not favour any particular weapon and often relies only on his bare hands to fight enemies, even when he is outnumbered. His prowess in qinggong is also legendary.

Lu Xiaofeng's close friends and network of contacts include Hua Manlou (花滿樓), a blind but highly observant martial artist who prefers to resolve conflicts without violence; Sikong Zhaixing (司空摘星), a thief who is highly-skilled in qinggong and the art of disguise; Ximen Chuixue (西門吹雪), a powerful swordsman who appears to be a cold-blooded and ruthless killer; and Zhu Ting (朱亭), a master craftsman; Laoshi Heshang ('Truthful Monk' (老實和尚)), an honest monk whom Lu Xiaofeng seeks advice from; Guisun Daye ('Tortoise Master' (龜孫大爺)), a mysterious hermit who provides Lu Xiaofeng information in exchange for money.

== Novels ==
Lu Xiaofeng Series
- Lu Xiaofeng Chuanqi; Xiuhua Dadao; Juezhan Qianhou; Yingou Dufang; Youling Shanzhuang; Fengwu Jiutian; Jianshen Yixiao
- Author: Gu Long
- Country: Taiwan; Hong Kong
- Language: Chinese
- Genre: Wuxia
- Publisher: Wuxia and History; Wuxia Chunqiu
- Published: 1973–1981
- Media type: Print

=== Lu Xiaofeng Chuanqi ===
Lu Xiaofeng Chuanqi (陸小鳳傳奇), literally The Legend of Lu Xiaofeng, is the first novel in the series introducing the titular protagonist. A mysterious martial arts sect, Qingyilou (青衣樓), has recently emerged and started causing trouble in the jianghu.

Out of curiosity, Lu Xiaofeng investigates and meets Princess Fengdan (鳳丹公主), the daughter of a ruler of a kingdom in the Western Regions. The king is seeking revenge on three traitors who have changed their identities and are now among the wealthiest martial artists in the jianghu. Lu Xiaofeng seeks help from his friends, Hua Manlou and Ximen Chuixue, as he knows he cannot complete the quest alone.

After Lu Xiaofeng defeats the three traitors, Hua Manlou and Princess Fengdan go missing. Lu Xiaofeng also discovers that the king is actually an imposter. On the brink of imminent danger, Lu Xiaofeng manages to reverse the odds and solve the mystery.

=== Xiuhua Dadao ===
Xiuhua Dadao (繡花大盜), literally The Embroidery Bandit, is the second novel in the series. A mysterious figure known as the "Embroidery Bandit" is suspected of having robbed a security company of a large amount of gold and broken into a prince's residence. The authorities order the detective Jin Jiuling (金九齡) to investigate and arrest the bandit.

Jin Jiuling seeks Lu Xiaofeng's help to crack the case within eight days. With help from his friends Sikong Zhaixing, Xue Bing (薛冰) and the "Serpent King" (蛇王), Lu Xiaofeng lures the bandit into a trap, making him reveal his true identity as Jin Jiuling. Lu Xiaofeng defeats him and recovers the stolen items.

=== Juezhan Qianhou ===
Juezhan Qianhou (Chinese: 決戰前後), literally Before and After the Duel, is the third novel in the series. Ximen Chuixue and Ye Gucheng (葉孤城), the two most powerful swordsmen in the jianghu, have arranged for a duel at the rooftop of the Hall of Supreme Harmony in the Forbidden City on the night of the Mid-Autumn Festival.

As the news spread throughout the jianghu, many people travel to Beijing to watch the duel and bet on the outcome. Before the duel,Ximen Chuixue disappears mysteriously and Ye Gucheng is wounded. At the same time, two of Lu Xiaofeng's acquaintances, Li Yanbei (李雁北) and Guisun Daye, are murdered, while Lu Xiaofeng's romantic partner, Ouyang Qing (歐陽情), is poisoned. Lu Xiaofeng suspects that the duel is a cover for something sinister.

After investigating, Lu Xiaofeng discovers that Ye Gucheng is the mastermind behind a plot to assassinate the emperor, and manages to stop him. The duel between the two swordsmen still proceeds as planned, and concludes with Ximen Chuixue defeating Ye Gucheng.

=== Yingou Dufang ===
Yingou Dufang (銀鉤賭坊), literally The Silver Hook Gambling House, is the fourth novel in the series. The son of the Demonic Cult's (魔教) leader has been murdered. Lanhuzi (藍鬍子), the owner of the Silver Hook Gambling House, initially accuses Lu Xiaofeng of committing the murder. However, he promises to help Lu Xiaofeng prove his innocence if, in return, Lu Xiaofeng helps him find the cult's lost sacred artefact.

Lu Xiaofeng finds the artefact but discovers that it is fake; the real one is actually with Lanhuzi. It turns out that Lanhuzi has been plotting to seize control of the cult's leadership and he has framed Lu Xiaofeng for the murder in order to distract the cult. Lu Xiaofeng defeats Lanhuzi, exposes the plot, and returns the artefact to its rightful owner.

=== Youling Shanzhuang ===
Youling Shanzhuang (幽靈山莊), literally Phantom Manor, is the fifth novel in the series. In this story, Lu Xiaofeng had apparently molested Ximen Chuixue's wife, resulting in the swordsman trying to hunt him down and kill him.

Lu Xiaofeng takes shelter in the sinister Phantom Manor run by Laodao Bazi (老刀把子), who is planning to eliminate four rivals and obtain a book containing secrets of the jianghu. The book is hidden in the hat of the Wudang Sect's leader.

Lu Xiaofeng foils Laodao Bazi's plan and exposes Laodao Bazi's true identity as a Wudang Sect elder plotting to seize the sect's leadership position. It also turns out that Lu Xiaofeng and Ximen Chuixue had caught wind of the plot earlier and faked everything to trick Laodao Bazi into allowing Lu Xiaofeng to enter Phantom Manor.

=== Fengwu Jiutian ===
Fengwu Jiutian (鳳舞九天), literally The Phoenix Dances in the Nine Heavens, is the sixth novel in the series. A large amount of gold belonging to a prince has been robbed during its delivery and the 109 escorts have gone missing.

Lu Xiaofeng secretly follows two disguised martial artists on board a ship and ends up on an island, which is home to a group of mercenaries led by Gong Jiu (宮九). The missing escorts are held captive there. Lu Xiaofeng also meets a mysterious woman, Sha Man (沙曼), and falls in love with her.

After Lu Xiaofeng escapes with Sha Man from the island, Gong Jiu spreads rumours in the jianghu, accusing Lu Xiaofeng of committing the robbery. Lu Xiaofeng enlists Ximen Chuixue's help to clear his name and eventually discover that Gong Jiu is the mastermind behind the robbery. Lu Xiaofeng then confronts Gong Jiu and defeats him.

=== Jianshen Yixiao ===
Jianshen Yixiao (劍神一笑), literally Laughter of the Sword God, is the seventh novel in the series. Ximen Chuixue seeks Lu Xiaofeng's help in tracking down a swordsman, Liu Chengfeng (柳乘風).

Lu Xiaofeng travels to a desert town, where he discovers Liu Chengfeng's dead body. He soon realises that the town is full of lurking dangers, and also traces clues from Liu Chengfeng's death to a former imperial consort, Gong Susu (宮素素).

After exploring the area, he locates a hidden treasure in the desert. The villains in the town have secretly followed him there and they attack him. Lu Xiaofeng is apparently stabbed and killed.

Just then, Ximen Chuixue shows up and reveals that Lu Xiaofeng is still alive. They have set a trap for the villains, whom they defeat. At the end of the story, for the first time ever, the cold and unfeeling Ximen Chuixue bursts into laughter.

== Adaptations ==
=== Films ===
Year	Title	Main cast	Notes
1978	Clan of Amazons	Tony Liu, Ching Li, Ling Yun, Elliot Ngok, Shih Szu	
1980	Legend of Lu Xiao Fong	Meng Fei, Ling Yun, Shih Feng	
1981	The Last Duel	Barry Chan, Ling Yun, Nora Miao	
1981	The Duel of the Century	Tony Liu, Elliot Ngok, Jason Pai, Linda Chu, Helen Poon, Sun Chien, Lung Tin-sang	
1981	Take the Rap	Meng Fei, Shih Feng, Yang Chun-chun	
1996	Feng Wu Jiu Tian	Meng Fei, Anthony Wong, Yang Chun-chun	
2000	The Duel	Andy Lau, Ekin Cheng, Nick Cheung, Kristy Yang, Zhao Wei, Patrick Tam	

=== Television ===
Year	Title	Main cast	Notes
1976	Luk Siu-fung	Damian Lau, Wong Wan-choi, Wong Yuen-sun, Adam Cheng, Wong Hang-sau, Kwan Hoi-san	
1986	The Return of Luk Siu-fung	Alex Man, Wong Wan-choi, Austin Wai, Rebecca Chan, King Doi-yum, Lau Kong	
2000	Master Swordsman Lu Xiaofeng	Jimmy Lin, Christopher Lee, Max Mok, Kristy Yang, Thomas Ong, Qi Yuwu, Tao Hong, Wu Hsing-kuo	
2001	Master Swordsman Lu Xiaofeng 2	Eric Suen, Christopher Lee, Gigi Lai, Rayson Tan, Ma Yong, Yvonne Lim, Mark Cheng, Yu Rongguang	
2007	The Legend of Lu Xiaofeng	Julian Cheung, Ken Chang, Cheung Tat-ming, Peter Ho, Yan Kuan, Fann Wong, Cecilia Liu, Cynthia Khan, Wong Jat-fei	
2014	Detectives and Doctors	Raymond Lam, Kent Cheng, Lemon Zhang, Zhang Xiaolong, Lan Xi, Nikita Mao, Zong Fengyan, Leanne Liu, Tan Junyan, Cai Juntao, Zeng Zeng, Jojo Chen	
TBA	The Legend of Lu Xiaofeng	Gong Jun, Zheng Yecheng, Riley Wang, Quan Yi Lun, Chang Long, Li Qing	

=== Others ===
Luk Siu-fung (陸小鳳) is also the title of the theme song of Part 1 of the 1976 Hong Kong television series. It was composed by Joseph Koo, lyrics provided by Wong Jim, and sung by Adam Cheng in Cantonese.

In the opening to the 1996 film Forbidden City Cop, Stephen Chow's character Ling Ling-Fat tries to arrest Lu Xiaofeng, Hua Manlou, Ximen Chuixue and Ye Gucheng for fighting on the roof of the Hall of Supreme Harmony in the middle of the night. Ye Gucheng tries to bribe off Ling Ling-Fat with a manual for his secret sword style, but Ling Ling-Fat charges them with multiple crimes. Irritated, the four leap off into the night, leaving Ling Ling-Fat bamboozled on the roof.
