= Calvin Ashford =

African-American interior designer

Calvin Ashford, Jr.
- Born: Ypsilanti, Michigan, US
- Died: 24 June 2008 (aged 73); Gold Coast, Illinois, US
- Education: Interior design, Columbia University (BFA); Microbiology, University of Michigan (MFA); Microbiology, University of Illinois (PhD)
- Organization: The Black Interior Designers Association
- Relatives: Nickolas Ashford (brother)

Calvin Ashford, Jr. (c, 1935 – June 24, 2008) was an African-American interior designer based in Chicago, Illinois. He was the principal designer and the design director at Gilmore-Ashford-Powers Designs, which he opened in the 1970s. He also founded The Black Interior Designers Association in 1998, and was active in The Organization of Black Designers until his death.

== Early life and family ==
Ashford was born in Ypsilanti, Michigan, in 1935. He was the son of Calvin Ashford and Alice Ashford. His father was a construction worker.

Ashford grew up in Willow Run, Michigan as the oldest of five boys (Nick Ashford, Albert Ashford, Paul Ashford, Henry Ashford).

== Education ==
Ashford finished high school early, then moved to New York City to attain a fine arts degree in interior design at the Columbia University, and graduated at the age of 18. Afterwards, he went to London to complete an apprenticeship. He continued his academic career at University of Michigan and pursued a master's degree in microbiology. It was hard for him to find a job as an interior designer as an African-American, but African Americans could be teachers. He then got his doctorate degree in microbiology at the University of Illinois at Chicago Medical. He was offered a job as an assistant professor at the University of Illinois.

== Career ==
Ashford opened Gilmore-Ashford-Powers Designs at the Lake Point Tower, which was the tallest apartment building in the world at the time (1977) until 1991.

In the same building as his interior design company Gilmore-Ashford-Powers Designs, Calvin worked with Richard Green, a radiologist at the Cook County Hospital, to design a bachelor-vibe infused interior on the 45th floor of the Lake Point Tower. The apartment was decorated in accordance to the client's style, which was a combination of contemporary and color.

He was the principal designer and design director at Gilmore-Ashford-Powers Designs, where he closely worked with Keith Moore for 18 years.

His brother Nickolas Ashford of the Ashford and Simpson duo (with Valerie Simpson) introduced Diana Ross and Dionne Warwick to Calvin, and from then on, his fame grew, as did his celebrity clientele list.

Some of the celebrities he worked with were the following: Maya Angelou, Whitney Houston, Sammy Sosa, Jalen Rose, Juwan Howard, Diana Ross, Dionne Warwick, Eddy Curry, Kendall Gill, Michael Finley, Lauren Bacall, Lana Turner, Gina Lollobrigida, Mickey Rooney, and Raquel Welch.

Calvin also designed the interiors of many private residencies in Chicago, New York, Palm Springs (U.S., Canada, Great Britain), including one in Trump Tower.

== Recognition ==
- Ashford founded the Black Interior Designers Association in 1998 to support the African-American youths in interior design.
- He was active in the Organization of Black Designers.
- In 1990, Ashford won one of the Chicago Design Awards.
- He was listed in "Who's Who in Interior Design".
- He was awarded the Design Pioneer award.

== Death ==
On June 24, 2008, Ashford died at his home in Gold Coast at the age of 73 from cancer.
