= Master Swordsman Lu Xiaofeng =

2001 Chinese TV series

- VCD cover art
- 陆小凤之决战前后
- Genre: Wuxia
- Based on: Lu Xiaofeng Series by Gu Long
- Directed by: Daniel Lee
- Creative director: Shen Lide
- Starring: Jimmy Lin; Christopher Lee; Max Mok; Kristy Yang; Tao Hong; Wu Hsing-kuo
- Ending theme: "I Don't Regret" (我不后悔) by Jimmy Lin; "For Him" (为了他) by Tao Hong
- Country of origin: China
- Original language: Mandarin
- No. of episodes: 20

Production
- Production location: China
- Running time: ≈ 45 minutes per episode
- Production companies: China Children Film Production Factory; Guangxi Golden Voice; Zhejiang ATV Broadcasting; Beijing Jinyingma Film Culture

Original release
- Network: TCS-8 (Singapore)
- Release: November 2, 2001

Related
- Master Swordsman Lu Xiaofeng 2 (2001)

Master Swordsman Lu Xiaofeng (陆小凤之决战前后) is a 2001 Chinese wuxia television series adapted from the Lu Xiaofeng Series by Gu Long. It was followed by a sequel, Master Swordsman Lu Xiaofeng 2, which is also based on the Lu Xiaofeng Series. The series was directed by Daniel Lee and starred cast members from mainland China, Taiwan, Hong Kong and Singapore.

== Cast ==
- Jimmy Lin as Lu Xiaofeng
- Christopher Lee as Ximen Chuixue
- Thomas Ong as Hua Manlou
- Kristy Yang as Sha Man
- Max Mok as Laoshi Heshang
- Qi Yuwu as Sikong Zhaixing
- Jacelyn Tay as Gongsun Daniang / Niuroutang
- Constance Song as Lady Boss
- Wu Hsing-kuo as Ye Gucheng
- Theresa Lee as Shangguan Feiyan
- Tao Hong as Ouyang Qing
- Fang Jiwei as Sun Xiuqing
- Zheng Geping as Gong Jiu

== Release ==
The television series was broadcast on 2 November 2001 in Singapore.

== Reception ==
The first episode had a viewership of 628,888. Despite the high viewership, general reception was negative towards the three main leads.

== Sequel ==
A sequel, Master Swordsman Lu Xiaofeng 2, was in preparation when the TV series was broadcast in Singapore.
