= Mei Ju-ao =

Chinese jurist and professor (1904–1973)

- 梅汝璈
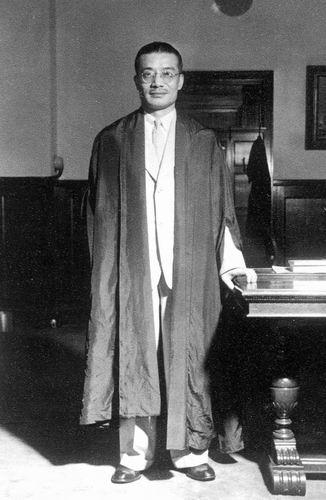

Member of the Legislative Yuan for Jiangxi Province
- In office 1934–1949

Personal details
- Born: 7 November 1904 Nanchang, Jiangxi (Qing dynasty)
- Died: 23 April 1973 (aged 68)
- Education: Tsinghua University (BS); Stanford University (BA); University of Chicago (JD)

Mei Ju-ao (Chinese: 梅汝璈; pinyin: Méi Rǔ'áo; 7 November 1904 – 23 April 1973) was a Chinese jurist, professor, politician, and author. He is noted for being China's representative at the Tokyo War Crimes Tribunal.

== Education ==
Mei was born in Nanchang, in eastern China's Jiangxi province. At the age of 12, Ju-ao was admitted into a school on the site of what is now Tsinghua University, moving from Nanchang to Beijing in pursuit of a good education. After graduating, he received financial assistance to study at Stanford University in California, graduating with a bachelor's degree in liberal arts in 1926.

While there, he was elected a member of Phi Beta Kappa Society. Mei later received a doctorate in law (J.D.) from the University of Chicago in 1928. After spending a year traveling around Europe, Mei returned to China in 1929.

== Career ==
He served as professor of law at Nankai University and Fudan University, as a legal adviser to the Ministry of the Interior of the Nationalist Government, and as a member of the Legislative Yuan.

=== Tokyo Trials ===
During the period of 1946–48, Mei was the Chinese judicial delegate to the International Military Tribunal for the Far East. He participated in the trials of Japanese war criminals shortly after the Second World War. He represented Chinese interest to prosecute Japanese Imperial Army personnel for the Massacre of Nanjing including Iwane Matsui and Koki Hirota.

=== People's Republic period ===
Mei returned to China after the Tokyo Trials. He supported the Communists led by Mao Zedong and served as a member of the Chinese People's Political Consultative Conference, a special advisor to the Ministry of Foreign Affairs, executive director of the Chinese People's Institute of Foreign Affairs, and a member of the Chinese branch of the World Peace Council. He was persecuted during the Cultural Revolution.

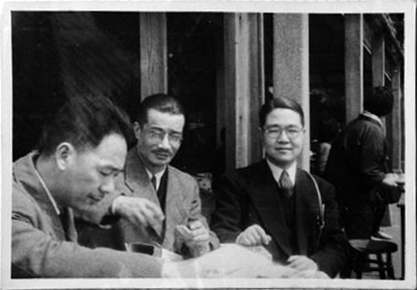
Mei Ju-ao (center) and Ni Zhengyu

== Portrayals ==
Mei was portrayed by Damian Lau in the Chinese film The Tokyo Trial (2006) and by David Tse in the NHK miniseries Tokyo Trial (2016).

== Work ==
- "China and the Rule of Law." Pacific Affairs, Vol. 5, No. 10. (Oct., 1932), pp. 863–872. (Available through JSTOR)

== See also ==
- The Tokyo Trial (film)
- Cultural Revolution
- War crimes in World War II
- Chinese law
