= Master Swordsman Lu Xiaofeng 2 =

2001 Chinese TV series

- VCD cover art
- 陆小凤之凤舞九天
- Genre: Wuxia
- Based on: Lu Xiaofeng Series by Gu Long
- Screenplay by: Xie Junyuan; Su Binhua; Lu Rongguang
- Directed by: Xu Huikang; Luo Ting
- Creative director: Shen Lide
- Starring: Eric Suen; Christopher Lee; Gigi Lai; Rayson Tan; Yvonne Lim
- Ending theme: "Love Beyond the Sky" (天外有情) by Dreamz FM
- Country of origin: China
- Original language: Mandarin
- No. of episodes: 20

Production
- Executive producers: Wu Yonglin; Zhu Cheng; Cong Jiazhe; Lü Huade; Wang Liping; Liu Xiaozhong; Wu Qiaoyi
- Producers: Cui Lizhong; Jiang Peizhen; Li Tianxing
- Production location: China
- Camera setup: Zhao Weixian; Lin Hecun
- Running time: ≈ 45 minutes per episode
- Production companies: China Children Film Production Factory; Guangxi Golden Voice; Zhejiang ATV Broadcasting; Beijing Jinyingma Film Culture

Original release
- Network: MediaCorp TV Channel 8 (Singapore)
- Release: 2001

Related
- Master Swordsman Lu Xiaofeng (2001)

Master Swordsman Lu Xiaofeng 2 (陆小凤之凤舞九天) is a Chinese wuxia television series adapted from the Lu Xiaofeng Series by Gu Long. It is a sequel to Master Swordsman Lu Xiaofeng, which was released earlier in the same year. The series starred cast members from mainland China, Hong Kong and Singapore.

== Cast ==
- Eric Suen as Lu Xiaofeng
- Gigi Lai as Han Ling
- Christopher Lee as Ximen Chuixue
- Rayson Tan as Hua Manlou
- Ma Yong as Sikong Zhaixing
- Yvonne Lim as Ye Xue
- Mark Cheng as Ye Guhong / Laodao Bazi
- Yu Rongguang as Gong Jiu
- Stephanie Lim as Sha Man
- Gong Xiaoxuan as Niuroutang
- Zhang Peihua as Master Kugua
- Fang Jiwei as Sun Xiuqing
- Hu Shida as Yue Yang
- Jerry Chang as Duan Yi

== Production ==
The sequel was in preparation when the Master Swordsman Lu Xiaofeng was first broadcast in Singapore

== Accolades ==
Organisation	Year	Category	Recipient(s)	Result	Ref.
Star Awards	2001	Best Supporting Actress	Yvonne Lim	Nominated	
Star Awards	2001	Best Theme Song	Tianwai Youqing	Nominated	
