= The Awakening Story =

- Promo poster
- 婚前昏後
- Genre: Modern Drama
- Starring: Damian Lau; Liza Wang; Louisa So; Maggie Cheung Ho Yee; Joe Ma
- Opening theme: "給自己的情書" by Faye Wong
- Country of origin: Hong Kong
- Original language: Cantonese

Production
- Running time: 45 minutes (approx.)

Original release
- Network: TVB
- Release: September 24 – October 26, 2001

The Awakening Story (Chinese: 婚前昏後) is a 2000 TVB drama series. The story is centered on Shuet (Liza Wang), who wakes up from a 16-year coma after a car accident, and how she deals with all the changes that has happened since.

== Main Plot ==
After Shuet wakes up from her coma, it is slowly revealed that 16 years earlier, Shuet was trying to leave her husband and family because of stress and loneliness. The catalyst was ultimately caused by her eldest daughter, Hing Ka (Maggie Yee), who threw a tantrum about getting a cake. As Shuet was about to leave, she realized then that she could not live without her family and decided to return. After purchasing the cake for Hing Ga, she was hit by a car which had led to the 16-year coma.

Meanwhile, the relationship between Shuet and her husband, Philip (Damian Lau), had always been on the verge of falling apart, one of the reasons being their differing opinions. The youngest son, Hing Chai (Patrick Tang), wanted to become a professional hairstylist: Philip opposed to the idea, but Shuet thought it best for her son to follow his dreams. The youngest daughter, Hung Yun (Tavia Yeung), wanted to date and marry Lok (Ellesmere Choi): because Lok was unemployed, Philip did not approve of him, but Shuet gave her blessing to the couple.

In the midst of everything, Philip was having an affair with a woman from his company. Shuet eventually finds out about her husband's infidelity, and divorces him. Hing Ga, unable to forgive herself that she was the cause of her mother's coma, blames herself for everything that has happened. Shuet reassures and encourages Hing Ga that she will be alright.

Shuet resolves to become strong and independent, and starts a period of transition for herself. She starts to learn about technology and business, and goes job hunting to get experience, even going so far as to accept a cleaning maid job. Shuet gains more knowledge within this process and gets an extreme makeover for herself, and succeeds in landing a prosperous job. She manages to surpass her ex-husband, who has fallen in love with her again...

== Main cast ==
- Damian Lau (劉松仁) as Philip Suen Hok Kei (孫學祺)
- Liza Wang (汪明荃) as Lam Ho Shuet (林皓雪)
- Louisa So (蘇玉華) as Susan Chiu Cheuk Lam (趙卓琳)
- Maggie Cheung Ho Yee (張可頤) as Rose Suen Hing Ka (孫慶家)
- Joe Ma (馬德鐘) as Fong Sing Heem (方誠謙)
- Patrick Tang (鄧健泓) as Stephen Suen Hing Chai (孫慶齊)
- Myolie Wu (胡杏兒) as Sheung Ping Ping (常平平)
- Tavia Yeung (楊怡) as Suen Hing Yun (孫慶欣)
- Ellesmere Choi (蔡子健) as Chan Wing Lok (陳永樂)
- Lo Yuen Yan (盧宛茵) as Foon (戴襯歡)
- Lo Hoi Pang (盧海鵬) as Fong Gam Pang (方錦鵬)
- Law Lan (羅蘭) as Guan Sing Nam (關勝男)
- Jeung Hak (張松枝) as Dickson Tong Lap Shun (唐立信)
- Natalie Wong (黃紀瑩) as Rachel Au Seen Ying (歐倩盈)
- Simon Lo (魯文傑) as Kim (羅金寶)
