= Return the Pearl to Thee =

Taiwanese television series

Return The Pearl To Thee (traditional Chinese: 還君明珠; simplified Chinese: 还君明珠) is a 1987 Taiwanese television series. It was produced by China Television and starred Damian Lau and Su Ming-Ming. It has 40 episodes.

The original producer Yang Pei-pei reproduced it into a 44 episodes TV series Torn Between Two Lovers (新还君明珠) (2008) in Mainland China starring Dong Jie and Calvin Li.

Return The Pearl To Thee was Su Ming-Ming's first television role. Television executives were unsure at first in Lau, a Hong Kong actor who was still unfamiliar to Taiwanese audiences, since he had an average appearance. According to the author Xiao Zhuang, despite this, the show became "an instant hit" in Taiwan. According to Changliu Bi-monthly Magazine, the television series was "critically acclaimed and commercially successful".

== Plot ==
Pearl, a daughter of the many wives of a Qing official meet a friend of her boyfriend. The man also loves her and finds himself the arranged husband of the woman and decide to revoke it. He already has a girlfriend. His younger brother, knowing that, tricks to make Pearl marry to him and force the other two to leave. The two take revenge and then find they are wrong.
