= Show Me the Happy =

- Official poster
- 依家有喜
- Genre: Modern sitcom
- Starring: Roger Kwok; Bernice Liu; Michelle Yim; Paul Chun; Annie Liu; Benz Hui; Derek Kok
- Opening theme: "依家有喜" by Bernice Liu
- Ending theme: "衣不稱身" By Auston Lam
- Original language: Cantonese
- No. of episodes: 80

Production
- Producer: Poon Ka-tak
- Production location: Hong Kong
- Camera setup: Multi-camera
- Running time: 22 minutes (approx.)
- Production company: TVB

Original release
- Network: TVB Jade
- Release: 29 November 2010 – 18 March 2011

Related
- Some Day; Be Home for Dinner

Show Me the Happy (Chinese: 依家有喜) is a 2010 TVB modern sitcom series.

== Plot ==
"Family Style" is a dedicated medical clinic run by the Chai family of three siblings after the death of their parents. The oldest sister, Anna Chai Chuen (Michelle Yim), deals with all the administrative management of the clinic. The second sister, obstetrician Anita Chai Sam (Annie Liu), has high expectations of all people and situations. Their brother, pediatrician Andy Chai Cheung (Roger Kwok), is frivolous. The three siblings treat their colleagues just like family.

In addition to the three siblings there is retired surgeon, oldest brother-in-law (Paul Chun); the accomplished plastic surgeon who is heads over heels for the second sister; the undercover pretty nurse (Bernice Liu); and the next generation family physicians and clinic staff. The complicated and subtle relationships causes different small life stories.

The daily battle of wits in the clinic between the sisters Anna and Anita leaves little brother Andy stuck in the middle with a headache. In the early years, oldest sister Anita was forced to give up her doctor career and become a nurse to look after the family. She paid for her two younger siblings' medical education. When the siblings started their own family practice, the two sisters had conflicts and arguments due to their different statuses. Often questions like "Are you the older sister or am I the older sister?" and "Are you the doctor or am I the doctor?" come up in the arguments.

== Cast ==
=== Chai family ===
Cast	Role	Description
Michelle Yim	Anna Chai Chuen 齊荃	Age 46; Registered nurse Anita and Andy's elder sister
Annie Liu	Dr. Anita Chai Sam 齊芯	Gynaecologist; Anna and Andy's sister Calvin's stepmother Tong Gam-Bou's sister-in-law
Roger Kwok	Dr. Andy Chai Cheung 齊彰	Age 36; Pediatrician; Cherry's boyfriend Anna and Anita's brother

=== God family ===
Cast	Role	Description
Paul Chun	Kot Yat-dou 葛一刀	Age 60; Retired doctor of surgery
Michelle Yim	Anna Chai Chuen 齊荃	Age 46; God Yat-dou's wife God Kei and God Fai's mother
Sandy Lau	Kay Kot Kei 葛琦	God Yat-Dou and Anna's eldest daughter God Fai's elder sister
Kirby Lam	Kot Fai 葛暉	God Yat-Dou and Anna's youngest daughter God Kei's younger sister

=== Tong family ===
Cast	Role	Description
Annie Liu	Dr. Anita Chai Sam 齊芯	Obstetrician-gynecologist; Step-mother of Calvin; Bowie's Sister-in-law
Derek Kwok	Dr. Bowie Tong Gam-bou 湯甘保	Age 36; Plastic surgeon Dr. Anita's brother-in-law
Auston Lam	Calvin Tong Ka-yim 湯嘉嚴	Anita's step-son Tong Gam-Bou's nephew Studying for doctorate in uni

=== Ching family ===
Cast	Role	Description
Benz Hui	Ching Cheung-kim 程祥劍	Has crush on Dr. Anita
Catherine Chau	Elaine Ching Yi 程薏	Dr. Anita's nurse. Has a crush on Bowie Tong.

=== Other cast ===
Cast	Role	Description
Bernice Liu	Cherry Lui Ying-hung 呂櫻紅	Age 28; Ex-undercover police Dr Andy's girlfriend Dr Andy's nurse
Annie Chong	Man Jing 文靜	Former pharmacist at Warm Care Clinic. Resigned after entering witness protection to testify against her drug-trafficking boyfriend.
Albert Law	Lam King-si 藍景思 藍 Sir	Narcotics Senior Inspector; Former supervisor of Cherry

== Viewership ratings ==
	Week	Episodes	Average points	Peaking points	References
1	November 29 - December 3, 2010	1 — 5	24	—	
2	December 6–10, 2010	6 — 10	25	—	
3	December 13–17, 2010	11 — 15	23	—	
4	December 20–24, 2010	16 — 20	21	—	
5	December 27–31, 2010	21 — 25	23	—	
6	January 3–7, 2011	26 — 30	24	—	
7	January 10–14, 2011	31 — 35	23	—	
8	January 17–21, 2011	36 — 40	23	—	
9	January 24–28, 2011	41 — 45	23	—	
10	January 31 - February 2, 2011, February 4, 2011	46 — 49	21	—	
11	February 7–11, 2011	50 — 54	24	—	
12	February 14–18, 2011	55 — 59	24	27	
13	February 21–25, 2011	60 — 64	24	—	
14	February 28 - March 4, 2011	65 — 69	25	—	
15	March 7–11, 2011	70 — 74	24	—	
16	March 14–18, 2011	75 — 79	25	27	
