= Glittering Days (TV series) =

Hong Kong television series

- Official poster
- 東方之珠
- Genre: Period Drama
- Starring: Roger Kwok; Charmaine Sheh; Liza Wang; Susanna Kwan; Paul Chun; Sharon Chan; Joel Chan; Lai Lok-yi
- Opening theme: "東方之珠" by Susanna Kwan
- Ending theme: "遙遙的祝勉" by Charmaine Sheh & Wong Cho Lam "白雲天" by Liza Wang & Wong Cho Lam
- Country of origin: Hong Kong
- Original language: Cantonese
- No. of episodes: 30

Production
- Producer: Terry Tong
- Running time: 45 minutes (approx.)

Original release
- Network: TVB
- Release: November 6 – December 15, 2006

Glittering Days (Traditional Chinese: 東方之珠) is a TVB period drama series broadcast in November 2006, starring Roger Kwok, Charmaine Sheh, Liza Wang and Susanna Kwan as the main leads. The series is shown to celebrate TVB's 39th Anniversary.

The plot takes place post 1967 to early 1970s. While the story is fictional, the atmosphere replicates the mandopop club scene in Hong Kong. The series played a number of mandopop songs that originated from Taiwan. As much of the Hong Kong club scenes were heavily dominated by mandopop music, many of the sets and TV charity shows were televised at the time, and recreated for the series.

== Synopsis ==
Chu Siu-Kiu (Susanna Kwan) plays a former renowned Shanghai singer along with Gam Yin (Liza Wang) that make the "Three Golden Flowers". In the description of the story, World War II broke out at that time, Gam Yin was separated from her son. Years later, Gam Yin was a teacher for a singing group in a Hong Kong bar. The prominent singer of the time, Ling Fung (Roger Kwok) and Gam Yin meet, but they do not get along at all. Every time they meet, something happens, whether it was an argument or a fight.

Chu Yuk-Lan (Charmaine Sheh) is Ling Fung's childhood friend who has a crush on him ever since they were so young. She makes her way out of the village side to find him, but there is something with her voice. When they first meet, Lan is from a walled village in the New Territories and seems woefully uneducated and naive about everything. Lan starts off as Gam Yin's student. Due to Ling Fung's pride, the two have difficulty getting together, with Ling Fung's singing career in the middle.

Wah Long (Evergreen Mak)'s wife, Hung Hang Gyun (Hong Wah) is a big fan of Ling Fung. Due to Law Wai's greediness, he kept on hinting to Gyun about Fung's love to her, hoping she can sponsor Fung and take the money from it. Gyun would actually believe Wai and decided to have an elopement with Fung to escape her abusive husband. Fung would eventually be confused and rejected her which resulted Gyun committing suicide. Before her death, Yin noticed her conversation with Fung and mistakenly thought Fung was the murderer by pushing her off from a building. Yin would secretly report it to Wah Long, causing him wanting to kill Fung. After Fung's performance at Wah Long's stationed police station, he was eventually brutally beaten up by Wah Long's men and was sent to the hospital. Wai was filled with regrets and told the entire story to Fung, causing him to be furious at him. He told Wai to tell the truth to the reporters which the latter agreed but made a lie to them and ran away after seeing Wah Long, knowing that he would be killed if he tells the truth.

Soon, the media would eventually call out Ling Fung as a swindler of love and money, causing him to experience a reverse of fortune. Ling Fung can no longer continue working in the musical world as he was fired from Pearl of the Orient. Fung then joined Lai Tak where Wai was working at but Wah Long and his men came to mess with him daily and Wai afraid that his career at Lai Tak would be overtaken by his brother, he decided to frame him on multiple occasions and no longer sees Fung as his brother anymore. Fung would eventually escape Shanghai to Temple Street and fake his identity as an Indian and became a worker at a fruit stall there. However he would be fired from his job and brutally beaten again by his boss and co-workers after speaking fluent Cantonese to them to find the pearl that Lan gave him. He would be saved by Ting Ling, the city manager for Temple Street.

Ling would bring Fung back to her place where he meets her daughter Wan Jau, who easily noticed him as Ling Fung. Fung denies her claims with his fake Indian accent as he does not want anyone to remember his former identity and Jau decided to call him "Little Black Brother". After knowing he is actually Fung, Ling invited him to be part of her band's street performance but he declined to prevent the folks in Temple Street noticing his identity and preventing Wah Long to come find him. Fung decided to help Ling's band selling sugar cane.

During Lan's time at Pearl of the Orient, she became a popular singer after being heavily encouraged by an anonymous fan of hers. She would be played tricks by former popular singers there, Fei Fei and Wai Jam as Lan's popularity blew up made them jealous. After Fung fled Shanghai, Wai was very poor on money and he decided to call some of his old flings to borrow money again but all of them declined. Wai would later call another one of his fling but after a ringing for a few seconds at her flat, her flat exploded and was sent to the hospital in a coma after falling asleep while boiling the water. Wai would take this opportunity to act as if he was infatuation with her, causing media attention and claimed the title of "King of Infatuation". With this fame and popularity, Wai joined the music industry as a singer and claimed another title called the "Diamond King".

Yin would eventually know Fung's whereabouts and reports to Wah Long again. Wah Long and his two other men came to Temple Street to kill him but was stopped by Ling after she warned he and his men that they will be fired if she reports it to their boss since she was a close friend of him. At this time, Fung accidentally finds out that the person who informs the reporter was Yin. Later, Yin finds out that her long lost son was actually Ling Fung, causing her to be filled with regrets for treating his son in the past. In-order for her make her relationship between her son become stable, she pretended to have been possessed by Fung's dead mother which caused Fung to believe for a short period time but was exposed and made Fung even more furious at her and not believing she is his biological mother. Under Ling's encouragement, Yin thought of a plan which is forcing him to join her band to get his confidence back. This plan eventually worked and he returned to Li De, claiming the title of "King of Lai Tak" and his career rosed to fame again.

Back in Shanghai, Fei Fei is now pregnant with the boss of Pearl of the Orient, Sheung Sheng. Due to Sheung Sheng caring more for his wife Lei Yuk Fung when Fei Fei was pregnant, she decided to insult her and her daughter in front of them but would have a miscarriage after Sheung Sheng's dog barked at her causing her to fell down in fear. After her miscarriage, Sheung Sheng still cared more for her daughter and wife, which caused her to be furious. She decided to leave Pearl of the Orient and Sheung Sheng after knowing he gave his first edition Pearl of the Orient lighter to Lan. Before leaving, she made Lan's father, Chu Dai-Kat lose his job there as a bartender by putting laxatives into the sodas.

Soon, Sheung Sheng would meet Kung Hoi, his old friend to illegally import diamonds overseas but they can't think of a scapegoat so they chose Wai to host a concert overseas. Wai overheard this conversation and decided to play along to take the diamonds for himself. Chu Dai-Kat is also friends with Kung Hoi, the duo would then talk about their past during the old days in a restaurant where Hoi would tell Kat about him helping Soeng Sheng illegally importing diamonds overseas and revealing the death of Chung Chi Yan, the husband of Gam Yin and the father of Ling Fung. After knowing the truth about his death, Kat quickly tells Yin about it and she reported to Wah Long about them illegally importing diamonds. However, Wah Long decided to take the all diamonds for himself. Wah Long would then meet Wai in the ship and the duo had a fight to get the diamonds. Wai would accidentally shoot Wah Long to death with a gun. Fung passed by and noticed Wah Long's corpse and before he could go further, he was knocked out with a metal bat by Wai. Gam Yin was worried about Fung as he did not come back after putting his luggage so she went searching him around the ship and found Wah Long's lifeless corpse beside Fung. Gam Yin later admitted herself as the murderer to help his son not going to jail.

Fung was happy after knowing she was in prison but was immediately in-shock after realizing Gam Yin was actually his biological mother. He and Kat would actually follow Law Wai on advising him to admit the murder. When Kat went to the toilet, Fung noticed Soeng Sheng and Kung Hoi and decided to follow them. It is revealed that Sheung Sheng and Kung Hoi already knew Wai's whereabouts and the duo decided to assassinate him to get the diamonds from him. However this plan failed Wai got hold of Hoi and shot him after taking Hoi's gun, while Fung was fighting with Sheng. The brothers would quickly flee from Sheng but reached a dead end at a cliff. Sheng attempted to kill the brothers but failed and accidentally killed himself by slipping off from the cliff.

The diamonds would eventually be hooked on a tree branch below the cliff and Wai decided get it but slips and was saved by Fung. Fung kept on insisting Wai to give up on the diamond but Wai doesn't listen and tells his brother that he is about to get it. By the time he gets it, Fung was exhausted and can't hold onto Wai's arms anymore, Wai eventually fell off from the cliff after his arm was slipped away from his brother's hand. Wai was later rescued and fell into a coma. Fung visits him and tells him that he does not mind how he was treated by him in the past anymore and he will wait for him to come out from jail as a new person. After hearing this, Wai started dropping tears and after his coma, he admitted to his crimes and was sent to jail.

Gam Yin was eventually released and had a live stage performance at Lai Tak with her son which impressed the audience. The drama ends with Ling Fung confessing his love to Chu Yuk-Lan in-which the latter accepted it and Fung telling her that he is the anonymous fan of hers before she blew up in popularity.

== Cast ==
| Cast | Role | Description |
|---|---|---|
| Roger Kwok | Law Tai-tei/Ling Fung 羅帶弟/凌豐 | Singer; Gam Yin's long lost son. Chu Yuk-Lan's lover. |
| Charmaine Sheh | Chu Yuk-Lan/Fan Lan 朱玉蘭/薰蘭 | Singer; Law Dai-Dei's lover. |
| Liza Wang | Gam Yin 金燕 | Singer ("Three Golden Flowers" Member); Law Dai-Dei's mother. |
| Susanna Kwan | Chu Siu-Kiu 朱小嬌 | Singer ("Three Golden Flowers" Member); Hui Wing-Hong's Mother |
| Paul Chun | Chu Dai-Kat 朱大吉 | Chu Yuk-Lan's father. |
| Sharon Chan | Shang Mei-Lai (Carol) 常美麗 | Sheung Sing's daughter Hui Wing-Hong's Lover |
| Cecilia Fong (方伊琪) | Li Yuk-Fung 李玉鳳 | Singer ("Three Golden Flowers" Member) |
| Lai Lok-yi | Hui Wing-Hong (James) 許永康 | Chu Siu-Kiu's Son; Shang Mei-Lai's Lover |
| Joel Chan (陳山聰) | Law Wai 羅威 | Singer |
| Bill Chan | Sheung Sing 常昇 | Shang Mei-Lai's father. |
| Halina Tam | Fei Fei 菲菲 | Singer |

== Viewership ratings ==
| | Week | Episode | Average Points | Peaking Points | References |
|---|---|---|---|---|---|
| 1 | November 6–10, 2006 | 1–5 | 29 | — | |
| 2 | November 13–17, 2006 | 6–10 | 30 | — | |
| 3 | November 20–24, 2006 | 11–15 | 31 | 34 | |
| 4 | November 27–December 1, 2006 | 16–20 | 31 | — | |
| 5 | December 4–8, 2006 | 21–25 | 32 | — | |
| 6 | December 11–15, 2006 | 26–30 | 33 | 35 | |

== Awards and nominations ==
40th TVB Anniversary Awards (2007)

- "Best Drama"
- "Best Actor in a Leading Role" (Roger Kwok - Ling Fung/Law Dai-Dei)
- "Best Actress in a Leading Role" (Liza Wang - Gam Yin)
- "Best Actress in a Leading Role" (Charmaine Sheh - Chuk Yuk-Lan)
- "Best Actor in a Supporting Role" (Paul Chun - Chu Dai-Kat)
- "Best Actress in a Supporting Role" (Halina Tam - Fei Fei)
- "My Favorite Male Character Role" (Roger Kwok - Ling Fung/Law Dai-Dei)
- "My Favorite Female Character Role" (Liza Wang - Gam Yin)
- "My Favorite Female Character Role" (Charmaine Sheh - Chuk Yuk-Lan)
