= Bernice Liu =

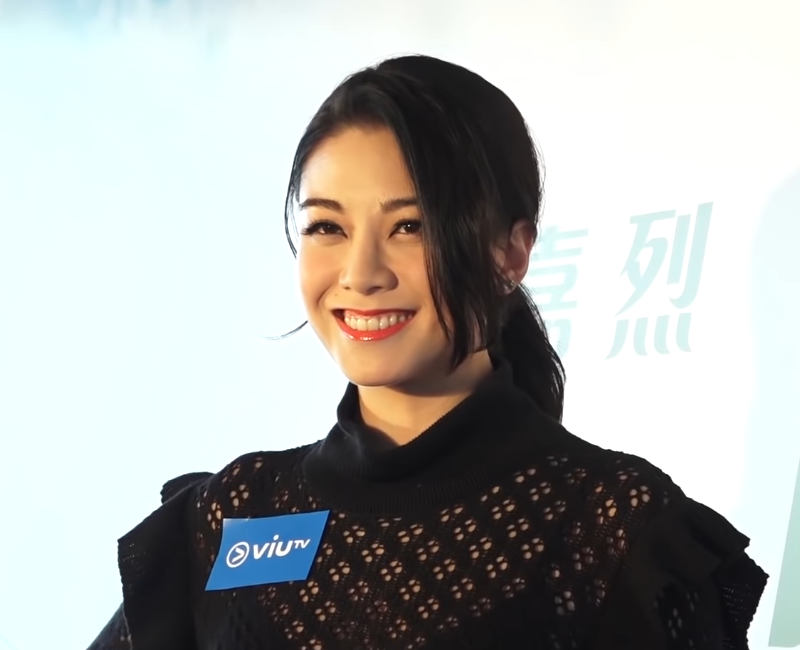
- Liu in 2017
- Born: January 6, 1979 (age 47); Prince Rupert, British Columbia, Canada
- Education: University of British Columbia (BComm), INSEAD (EMBA)
- Occupations: Actress, singer, commercial model
- Years active: 2000–present

Chinese name
- Traditional Chinese: 廖碧兒
- Simplified Chinese: 廖碧儿
Transcriptions
Standard Mandarin
- Hanyu Pinyin: Liào Bì'ér
Yue: Cantonese
- Jyutping: Liu6 Bik1 Yi4
- Musical career
- Origin: Hong Kong
- Website: www.berniceliu.hk

Bernice Jan Liu Bik-yee (born January 6, 1979) is a Canadian actress, singer, and commercial model based in Hong Kong. She has previously held the title Miss Chinese Vancouver 2000 as well as Miss Chinese International 2001, the latter position bringing her fame in Hong Kong. Liu left Television Broadcasts Limited (TVB) in 2011 and returned to Canada to continue her education. As of 2016, she has continued her acting for new broadcaster ViuTV.

Liu played the rule of Princess Sam-tin in the TVB sitcom, Virtues of Harmony, which was also her first role after joining TVB in 2001. Liu's singing breakthrough came in 2005, after she sang the theme song of the 2005 TVB serial drama, Into Thin Air, which she also stars in. The theme song, "Truth," was Liu's first theme song and was one of the primary promotional songs for the TVB compilation album, Lady in Red (2006), which sold over 10,000 copies in the first day of release. Liu was also listed by critics as one of the few TVB artists to look forward to in a future singing career.

== Early life and education ==
Liu was born in Prince Rupert, British Columbia on January 6, 1979.

Liu has a brother and a sister.

Liu attended the University of British Columbia for three years as a pre-med student in the Faculty of Science before transferring to UBC Sauder School of Business to pursue a Bachelor of Commerce. While in university, she worked at a Chinese language television station in Vancouver to learn conversational Cantonese. The television executives encouraged her to participate in beauty pageants, which led her to win both Miss Chinese Vancouver 2000 and Miss Chinese International 2001. Her victories caught the attention of talent scouts at TVB, who offered her an acting contract in March 2001. Liu accepted the offer and put her studies on hold to pursue an entertainment career. She originally struggled with reading the scripts as they were written in Chinese and received help from her family. She later re-enrolled at UBC Sauder in May 2018 and graduated spring 2020. Liu also graduated from the Global EMBA program at INSEAD.

== Career ==
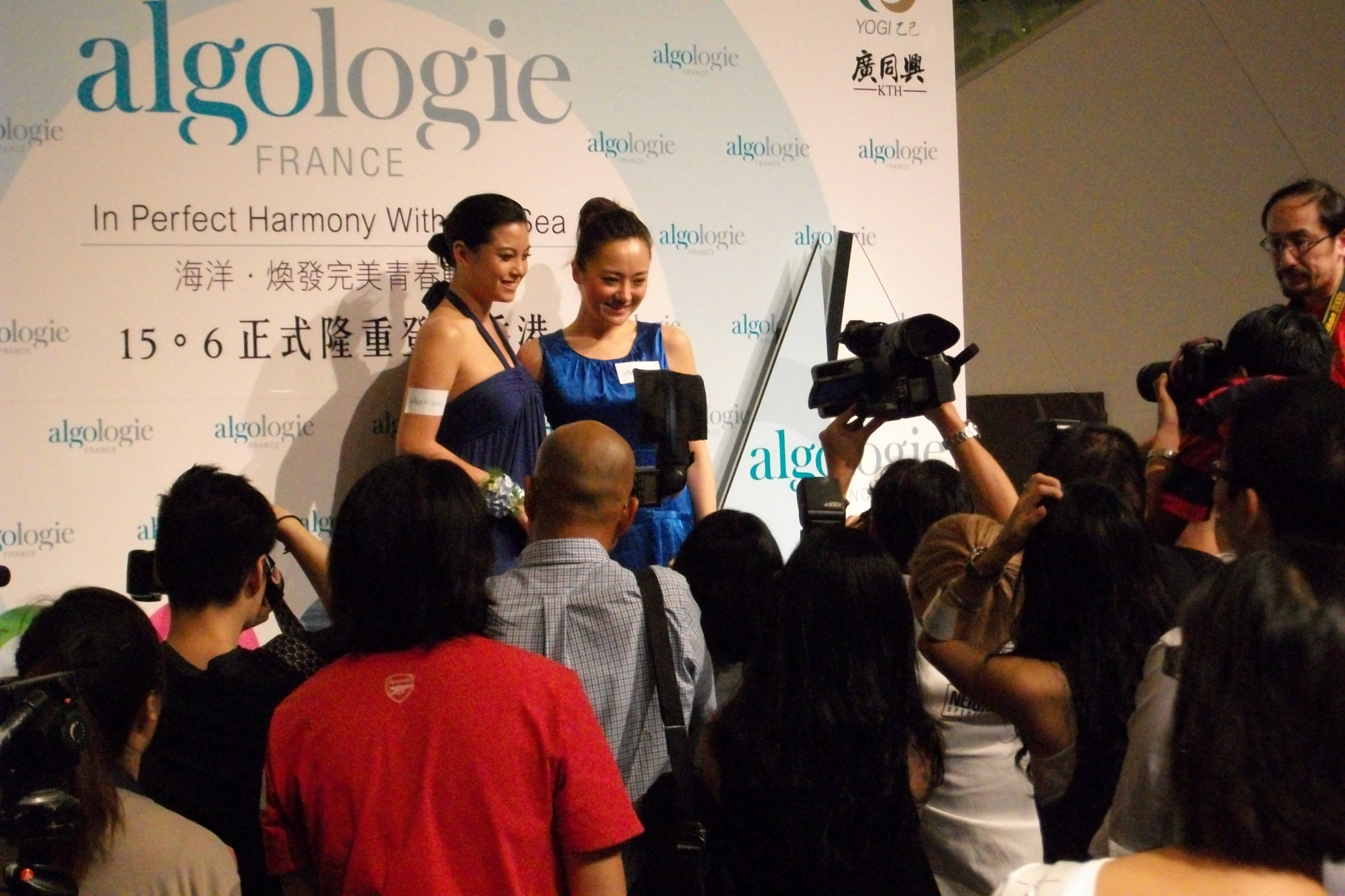
Liu in Harbour City

In 2002, after a successful reception of Virtues of Harmony, TVB produced Virtues of Harmony II, a modern spin-off of the sitcom, in which she played a different character.

"Truth" (2005)
Liu's first and most successful solo song to date.

In early 2011, after filming Show Me the Happy and Home Troopers with TVB, Liu left the station. She later starred in several Chinese dramas between 2011 and 2016 and continues to work for ViuTV.

Liu is the CEO and director of Bellavizio, a wine company she founded in 2008. They produce wine out of Bordeaux, France, and Napa, California.

Liu is the owner of WineMaven, an online community for wine enthusiasts.

Liu was awarded the Queen Elizabeth II Diamond Jubilee Medal in 2012.

== Personal life ==
Liu is a Christian. She was previously linked to actors Hawick Lau and Moses Chan, and was involved romantically with Hong Kong billionaire Calvin Lo.

== Filmography ==
=== Film ===
| Year | Film | Role | Notes |
|---|---|---|---|
| 2010 | Bad Blood | Audrey Lok | |
| 2010 | The King of Fighters | Vice | Direct-to-video |
| 2021 | The Attorney | | |

=== Television ===
| Year | Title | Role | Notes |
|---|---|---|---|
| 2001–2002 | Virtues of Harmony | Princess Sam-tin | |
| 2002 | Golden Faith | Alice | |
| 2003 | Survivor's Law | Jessica | |
| 2003 | Virtues of Harmony 2 | Joey | |
| 2005 | Healing Hands III | Betsy Tsang Suk-kei (曾淑淇) | |
| 2005 | Into Thin Air | Bobo | |
| 2005 | Love Bond | Milly | |
| 2007 | The Brink of Law | Wing | |
| 2007 | Devil's Disciples | Chi Lung | |
| 2007 | Survivor's Law II | Jessica | |
| 2007 | Steps | Samantha | |
| 2008 | When A Dog Loves A Cat | Kit | |
| 2010 | Show Me the Happy | Cherry | |
| 2010 | The Mysteries of Love | Nickole | |
| 2010–2011 | Home Troopers | Bowie | |
| 2012 | The Greatness of A Hero | | |
| 2012 | Mystery in the Palace | | First Chinese Drama |
| 2015 | Lion Mums | | |
| 2016 | Margaret and David: Green Beans | | |
| 2017 | Lion Mums 2 | | |
| 2018 | Being An Actor | | |
| 2018 | Afterlife Firm | | |
| 2019 | Till Death Do Us Part | | |
| 2019 | Showman's Show | | |

Awards and achievements
Miss Chinese Vancouver
| Preceded by Crystal Pan | Miss Chinese Vancouver; 2000 | Succeeded by Shirley Zhou |
Miss Chinese International
| Preceded by Sonija Kwok | Miss Chinese International; 2001 | Succeeded by Shirley Zhou |
