= Calvin Jones =

Calvin Jones may refer to:

== Music ==
- Calvin Jones (composer) (born 1966), American composer
- Calvin Jones (musician) (1929–2004), American trombonist, bassist, pianist, bandleader, composer and educator
- Calvin "Fuzz" Jones (1926–2010), American blues bassist

== Sports ==
- Calvin Jones (cornerback) (1951–2021), American football cornerback
- Calvin Jones (running back) (1970–2025), American football running back
- Cal Jones (1933–1956), American football offensive guard
- Calvin Jones (baseball) (1963–2022), American baseball pitcher

== Others ==
- Calvin Jones (physician) (1775–1846), North Carolina politician
- Calvin B. Jones (1934–2010), afrocentric visual artist
- B. Calvin Jones (1938–1998), American archaeologist
