= Calvin Jackson =

Calvin Jackson may refer to:

- Calvin Jackson (pianist) (1919–1985), American jazz pianist, composer, and bandleader
- Calvin Jackson (drummer) (1961–2015), American drummer
- Calvin Jackson (American football) (1972–2021), American football defensive back
- Calvin Jackson (serial killer) (born 1948), American serial killer and rapist
- Calvin Jackson Jr. (born 1997), American football wide receiver
