= The Organization of Black Designers =

The Organization of Black Designers is an organization founded in 1990 with a focus on interior, fashion, architectural, and graphic designers. This organization is the first to focus on empowering its membership and education through maintaining diverse design perspectives within world culture. They contribute in the creation of greater awareness and involvement of African Americans and other designers of color within design professions. Its national office is located in Washington, D.C., and the midwest office is located in Dayton, Ohio.

== Purpose ==
Organization of Black Designers puts effort into training more African Americans for a design career. They strive to project an enhanced image and provide visibility for African American designers. The company also tries to inform other communities on why good design is necessary and crucial in our environment.

Organization of Black Designers also increases dialogue and interaction between aspiring designers and the professional world. The organization focuses on emphasizing this aspect through education. The organization is a non-profit association committed to promoting visibility, empowerment, and interaction of its members, valuing the diverse perspectives of design that aid in world commerce and culture.

== Organizations ==
=== DesigNation ===
DesigNation was created by the Organization of Black Designers that debuted in October 1994. It is a worldwide conference brings together Graphic design, Industrial design, Fashion design, Interior design, Architecture, product, Advertising, Broadcast design and multi-media African American designers from all over the globe. The purpose of DesigNation is to provide a showcase of artwork to demonstrate and engage the community to explore more diversity in medias of art. An area of huge success within this organization is the Portfolio Review. This section of the conference allows for professionals and students to bring together their forms of artwork regardless of any established title. Another successful contributing factor is that it is the only designated conference for African Americans to portray their artwork to Major Fortune 500 companies such as:

- Nike, Inc.
- Disney (The Walt Disney Company, Walt Disney World)
- Ford Motor Company
- Hallmark Cards
- General Motors
- Steelcase
- Procter & Gamble

As of 2016, previous conferences held for DesigNation have been held in Atlanta, Miami, Los Angeles, Philadelphia and Chicago.

== Membership ==
Membership within the Organization for Black Design is formatted to promote its members through many different circumstances. The mission of joining is to improve the overall American design by engaging them through creative diversity. Not only does the organization benefit its members through program development, business opportunities and scholarly pursuit, but also for the assistance in continuing education. Membership to join the Organization for Black Design is open to all qualified design professionals, regardless of race, gender, or sexual preference.

=== Designer of the month ===
While being a member of the organization, there is a committee that elects a professional designer for each month. The committee works together in contemplating the best form of art through each designers diverse approaches. Designer of the Month recognizes African-American designers who have product, fashion, automotive, interior, graphic, web, animation, and/or architectural design. The elected designer for that month is given an informational entry within the front page of the Organization for Black Design's website, as well as, a newsletter about the individual to its already committed members.

=== Student of the month ===
Similar to the designer of the month, there is a committee that forms together to elect the designer of the month. These participants are current students that are focusing their talents into a form design. The elected designer for that month is given an information entry as well, which is shown upon the front page of the Organization for Black Design's website.

=== Types of designers ===
The Organization of Black Designers consists of 6,300 members; of those members 3,500 of them are design professionals. The organization has many different types of designers in different design fields. Some of these include:

- Urban planning
- Architecture
- Graphic design
- Advertising design
- Product Design
- Interior design
- Fashion design
- Transportation Design

== Directors/CEO ==
=== David Rice ===
David Rice is the founder and chair of the Organization of Black Designers. Rice received a full scholarship to and graduated from the College for Creative Studies in Detroit, MI. In 2007, Rice was honored as a Distinguished Alumni from the College for Creative Studies. When graduating from college, Rice received a degree in Industrial design. Rice credits the College for Creative Studies for much of his success and for providing him with the tools necessary to achieve success in business and in building relationships. Rice's post-graduate work was in marketing but focused heavily on Entrepreneurship Development. After graduating from the College for Creative Studies, Rice continued on to complete the Entrepreneur Development program at Harvard University in Cambridge, Massachusetts. Rice is also a former member of the Michigan Council for the Arts, as well as, a three-time member of the Design-Arts Panel of the National Endowment for the Arts. Under Rice's lead, the Organization of Black Designers have gained more than 6,300 members within the last 11 years. Rice strives to create many mentorship opportunities and develop awareness of the lack of racial and ethnic diversity in professions centered around design.
