= Calvin B. Jones =

Calvin Bell Jones (January 7, 1934 – August 21, 2010) was an afrocentric visual artist and a Black Arts Movement activist from Chicago. He is known primarily for his nine murals and paintings.

He was awarded a full scholarship to attend the School of the Art Institute of Chicago and received his BFA in drawing/painting and illustration in 1957. Jones' initial 17-year career was in advertising. He was Hallmark Cards' first African American Art Director and worked for the first black-owned ad agency, Vince Cullers Advertising (founded in 1956). Additionally, Jones worked with his own company, Sales Graphics Advertising.

Beginning in 1976, he became a community mural leader in Chicago and collaborated with Mitchell Caton on six Chicago murals. Additionally, Jones' mural portfolio includes a mural in Detroit and Atlanta.

== Personal life ==
In the 1950s, Jones married Irene Tabron. They had a son, Byron Jones in the 1950s.

In the 1960s, Jones developed keratoconus, a corneal condition that causes vision distortion. The condition left him legally blind for much of his life. He stated that it caused him "to see light like a kaleidoscope, eight times." Faheem Majeed, South Side Community Arts Center Executive Director and curator, posited that it was debatable if he created what he saw or if he was purposefully creating abstracted imagery. Jones received cornea transplants in the 1980s which restored his eyesight.

Jones kidney condition worsened while in California visiting his partner Cynthia Ross. He declined dialysis. His ashes are split between California's redwood forest and his surviving family.25 He is survived by his son Byron and his sister Alletta Jumper.

His papers are held at the Chicago Public Library

== Fine art paintings ==
Jones' paintings were exhibited internationally (Senegal and Nigeria). His work was included in the Art in Chicago, 1945-1995 exhibition.

The artwork of his early fine art career incorporated African American figures set against patterns reminiscent of African textiles. Jones' later artwork became abstract in the 1980s and used dramatic and textural compositions with intense colors, often incorporating objects onto the paintings such as bark, ceramic kiln furniture, feathers, dyed fabric and paper-mache.

When he was a freelancer, he was commissioned by Seagram Company and the Hiram Walker Foundation to paint what became the Beefeater set of limited edition prints "The Art of Good Taste". "The set comprises the seven original paintings which traveled across the U.S. throughout 1992, as part of a major program sponsored by Beefeater to celebrate African American culture through art. In its first year, "The Art of Good Taste" program generated 89.5 million impressions nationally through advertising, promotion, events, publicity and consumer offers. It was also acclaimed as "one of the most dramatic and well executed marketing promotional campaigns ever seen in the beverage industry." The program earned five awards from Beverage Dynamics, along with the PRAME Award for best ethnic campaign from the National Association of Market Developers and the National Black Public Relations Society.*"

== Murals ==
Jones and Caton's influenced the murals of Chicago, with their identifiable aesthetic of patterns and realistic figures which can still be seen with the murals "A Time to Unite (with Justine DeVan), "Another Time's Voice Remembers My Passions Humanity", and "Memories of the Future".

Jones and Mitchell Caton were part of the Chicago Mural Group. Their 1981 mural, Builders of the Cultural Present, used a segmented format in canted parallelograms for the mural composition.

Olivia Guide and Jeff Hueber credit Jones and Caton for their innovated nonuniform mural contours which create a dynamic sense of vibrancy and movement as the composition was not confined by the paint and the building's surface. Jones and Caton's murals used strong colors and were technically finely executed because of their strong draftsmanship.

Jones stated in 1994 that he did not use preliminary drawings or the grid method for his murals. He felt that it was a waste of his time. Jones would use African patterns in his mural designs to symbolize the progressive relationship between the past and the present.

"We, as people, all have our idiosyncrasies, prejudices and stereotypes concerning art and culture. The only way this gap can be bridged is through exposure and education. My challenge and obligation is to document, sensitize and relate to the Black experience of the societies and cultures in which we live and to be a responsible communicator in the projection and relation of my heritage -- the mirror of my spiritual center." Calvin B. Jones

== Solo exhibits ==
- 1971, 1972 and 1973 South Side Community Art Center, Chicago, IL
- 1970 – 1976 AFAM Gallery and Cultural Center, Chicago, IL
- 1978 Carter G. Woodson Regional Library, Chicago, IL
- 1979 Martin/Caraway Galleries, Dallas, TX
- 1987 South Shore Bank, Chicago, IL
- 1992 African World Festival, Detroit, MI
- 1992 Apollo Theater, Harlem Week, New York, NY
- 1992 National Conference of Artists, Michigan Chapter Gallery, Detroit, MI
- 1992 ETA Creative Art Foundation, Chicago, IL
- 1992 Bomani Gallery, San Francisco, CA
- 1992 Art Institute of Chicago, Illinois
- 1993 African World Festival, Detroit, MI
- 1993 Howard University, Gallery of Art, Washington, D.C.
- 1998 Isobel Neal Gallery Ltd., Chicago, IL, "Calvin Jones in Living Color"
- 2002 Elmhurst College, Elmhurst, IL
- 2012 Left of Center Art Gallery, Las Vegas, NV, "In Retrospective: Calvin B. Jones"

== Selected group exhibits ==
- 1955, 1973 Art Institute of Chicago, IL
- 1974 World's Fair, Black Art Pavilion, Spokane, WA
- 1975 Malcolm X Community College, Chicago, IL
- 1977 International Festac, Lagos, Nigeria
- 1980 Chicago International Art Exposition, Chicago, IL
- 1980 Martin Luther King Regional Library, Washington, D.C.
- 1989 Museum of Contemporary Art, Chicago, IL
- 1989 ETA Creative Arts Foundation, Chicago, IL
- 1989 Maier Museum of Art, Randolph-Macon Woman's College, Lynchburg, VA
- 1990 Harold Washington Library Center, Permanent Art Collection
- 1990 Chicago International Art Exposition
- 1992 National NAACP Convention, Nashville, TN
- 1992 National Urban League Convention, San Diego, CA
- 1992 U.S. Congressional Black Caucus Convention, Washington, D.C.
- 1992 Africamicas Festival, Philadelphia, PA
- 1993 The Corcoran Gallery of Art, Washington, DC, "I Remember...Thirty Years After the March on Washington: Images of the Civil Rights Movement 1963-1993.”
- 2001 Schomburg Center for Research in Black Culture, New York, NY, "Art of the Masters: A Survey of African American Images, 1980-2000",
- 2014 Left of Center Art Gallery, Las Vegas, NV, "Rhythms of Africa" exhibit, a component of "The Museum Collection of African Art"

== Commissions ==
- "The Art of Good Taste", an artistic celebration of African American culture sponsored by the Hiram Walker Foundation.
- "Five Memorable Moments in Motorola History", for Motorola's 50th anniversary exhibition. Five large montages depicting Motorola's rise from a small Chicago based company to a leading multi-national corporation. The exhibit toured 38 cities in the U.S., Europe, Mexico, Canada and Africa. It is permanently housed in Motorola's corporate offices in Schaumburg, IL; Scottsdale, AZ and Phoenix, AZ.
- "Historic Black Leaders of America" was in celebration of Coca-Cola Company's Bicentennial and to show their commitment to the accomplishments of famous Black Americans. Two paintings appeared on commemorative trays.
- Sixth Annual National Convention of the 100 Black Men of America, Inc., San Francisco, CA, 1992.

== Murals ==
- 1976 "Time to Unite", 41st Street and Drexel Boulevard, Chicago, IL, Artists: Calvin B. Jones, Mitchell Caton, Justine DeVan and assistants
- 1977 "In Defense of Ignorance", 8350 South Ashland, Chicago, IL, Artists: Calvin B. Jones and Mitchell Cato
- 1979 "Another Times Voice Remembers My Passion's Humanity", Elliot Donnelley Youth Center, Chicago, IL, Artists: Calvin B. Jones and Mitchell Caton
- 1979 "Continuity: Our Heritage Great, Our Destiny Even Greater:, Campbell Elementary School, Detroit, MI, Artist: Calvin B. Jones, in association with the National Conference of Artists: Kwasi Asante, Nelson Stevens, Napoleon Henderson Jones, Al Peterson, Dana Chandler, Ibn Pori Pitts with researcher and coordinator Edsel Reid
- 1980 "Ceremonies for Heritage Now", 3600 W. Ogden Avenue, Chicago, IL, Artists: Calvin B. Jones and Mitchell Caton
- 1981 "Builders of the Cultural Present", 71st Street and Jeffery Boulevard, Chicago, IL, Artists: Calvin B. Jones and Mitchell Caton
- 1985 "Untitled", 63rd and Wallace, Chicago, IL
- 1987 "Bright Moments - Memories of the Future", New Regal Theatre, Chicago, IL, Artists: Calvin B. Jones and Mitchell Caton
- 1990 "Triumphant Celebration", National Black Arts Festival Commission, 321 Edgewood Avenue, Atlanta, GA, Artist: Calvin B. Jones

== Awards ==
- 1980 Black Studies Collection
- 1981 South Shore Cultural Counsel Award for "Most Significant Community Contribution"
- 1981 National Black Studies Conference Muralist Award
- 1982 Artist-in-Residence, University of Illinois, Champaign-Urbana
- 1979 and 1983 The National Conference of Artists' First Aaron Douglas Muralist Award
- 1984 – 1985 The Directory of Distinguished American
- 1988 Kappa Alpha Psi Achievement Award in the Arts
- 1986 – 1989 Who's Who Among Blacks in America
- 1981 – 1992 Who's Who in American Art
- 1991 Atlanta Urban Design Commission Award of Excellence for Public Art
- 1992 ETA Creative Arts Foundation, Our Epic Men of the 20th Century
