= Liza Wang =

Hong Kong actress and singer

Liza Wang GBS SBS
- 汪明荃
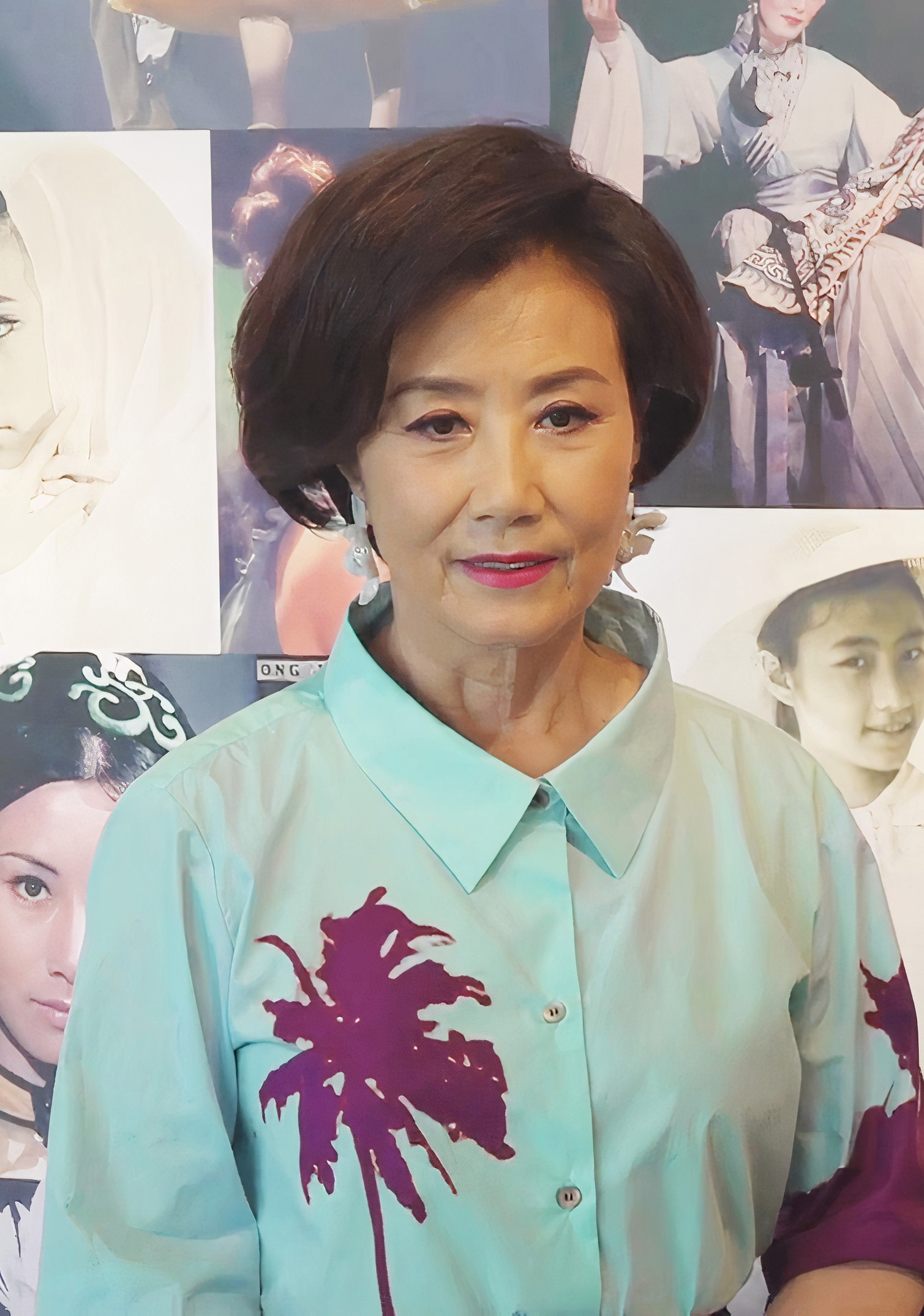
- Wang attending an exhibition on her Cantonese Opera career at the Hong Kong Polytechnic University in April 2021.
- Born: Wang Ming-chun; 28 August 1947 (age 79); Shanghai, Republic of China
- Other names: Liza Wong; Lisa Wang
- Occupations: Actress; singer; MC
- Years active: 1967–present
- Spouses: Lau Cheong Wah (m. 1971; div. 1983) Law Kar-ying (m. 2009)
- Awards: Ming Pao Anniversary Awards; Outstanding Actress in Television; 2005 Wars of In-Laws; 2005 Honorary AwardRTHK Top 10 Gold Songs Awards – Golden Needle Award; 2004 TVB Anniversary Awards – All-Time Most Memorable Female Leading Roles; 1999 A House Is Not A Home My Favourite Television Character; 2000 At the Threshold of an Era; 2001 The Awakening Story; Best Actress; 2001 The Awakening Story; 2005 Wars of In-Laws; Best Host; 2010 Fun with Liza and Gods; 2015 Sunday Songbird Lifetime Achievement Award; 2012; 2017
- Musical career
- Also known as: The Big Sister
- Origin: Hong Kong
- Genres: Cantopop; Chinese Opera
- Instrument: Vocals
- Formerly of: Four Golden Flowers

Chinese name
- Chinese: 汪明荃
Transcriptions
Standard Mandarin
- Hanyu Pinyin: Wāng Míngquán
Yue: Cantonese
- Jyutping: wong1 ming4 cyun4
- Hong Kong Romanisation: Wong Ming-chuen
- Website: Official website

Elizabeth "Liza" Wang Ming-chun GBS SBS (born 28 August 1947), is a Hong Kong diva, actress and MC. She is a personality in Chinese-speaking communities. She has been nicknamed "The Big Sister" in the Hong Kong entertainment circle. Wang was a delegate in the National People's Congress from 1988 to 1997, and she is a member of the Chinese People's Political Consultative Conference.

== Entertainment career ==
Wang was born on 28 August 1947 in Shanghai. She moved to Hong Kong in 1956 and signed up for Rediffusion Hong Kong's first Artist Academy class in 1967. From thousands of applicants, the 20-year-old Liza was one of the nine that were picked to attend acting classes. She was also the first to graduate from the academy (BA).

=== Television ===
Her career has spanned four decades, since 1967. She began working for Rediffusion Television Limited (later renamed Asia Television and now defunct) until she joined TVB in 1971. She was one of the members of the all-girl music group Four Golden Flowers. Wang initially made her mark in the entertainment industry in drama series. Her work in front of the camera was followed by that behind the scenes on television productions.

In 2005, she received the Best Actress award during TVB's 38th Anniversary. She received this award the second time for her role in Wars of In-laws. Wang received her first Best Actress award for her drama series The Awakening Story in 2001. She celebrated her 40th anniversary in the entertainment industry in 2007.

=== Singing career ===
In parallel with her acting career Wang had a successful singing career, based on albums for her television series, consisting of TV theme songs. She has sung cantopop as well as mandopop. She performed duets with singer Adam Cheng. She continues to perform TV theme songs such as "Pearl of the Orient" (東方之珠) for musical series like the 2006 Glittering Days.

=== Cantonese opera ===
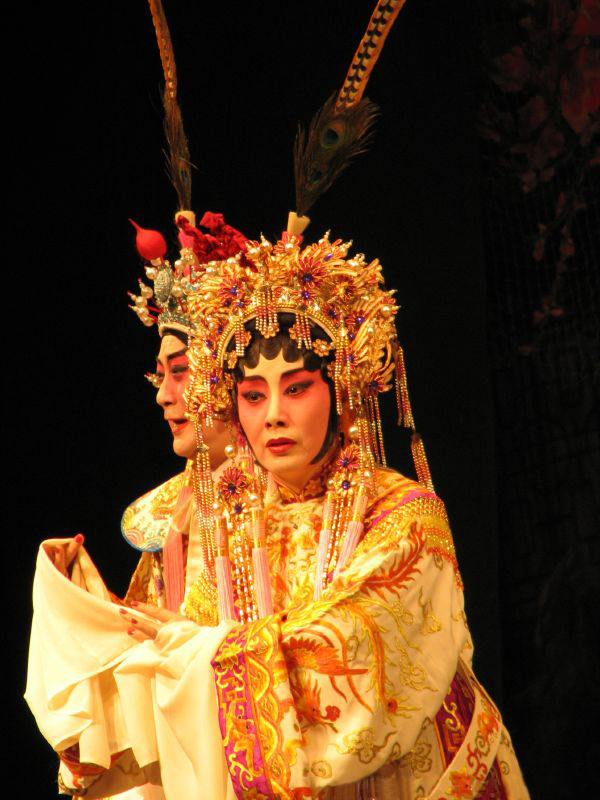
Wang performing Cantonese opera in November 2006.

Wang experimented with stage musicals before becoming a Cantonese opera actress. It was within the Cantonese opera community that she met her longtime partner, Law Kar-ying. In 2005 the Sunbeam Theatre in North Point, Hong Kong's only regular venue for Cantonese Opera performances, was planned to close following a change of ownership. Wang decided to negotiate with the new owner, who then promised to extend the contract with the Cantonese Opera groups. Wang then criticized the Government for its lack of support for Cantonese Opera, and the Government promised to adopt Wang's request.

Wang was Chairman of the Chinese Artist Association of Hong Kong from 1992 to 1997, then again from 2005 to 2009. In 2007 Wang was awarded the Montblanc de la Culture Arts Patronage Award. She was later awarded an Honorary Doctorate of Letters by the City University of Hong Kong.

In February 2009 Wang fought for the development rights to restore the North Kowloon Magistracy building (北九龍裁判法院) in Sham Shui Po. The building was originally proposed to be a new Cantonese opera training and performance center. Hong Kong's government granted the bid to the US Savannah College of Art and Design. Wang was upset over the loss, and said the government was only paying lip service to causes such as Cantonese opera. The magistracy building is to be turned into a school specializing in creative and digital media.

== Political career ==
=== Pan-democrat home return permits request ===
Since the 1997 handover of Hong Kong, the Chinese Communist Party have banned 8 of the 25 Hong Kong pan-democrat legislative councilors. They are barred from the mainland except for tours organized by the government. On 6 March 2008 Wang began publicizing the need to grant 24 Home Return Permit to the pro-democracy lawmakers.

=== Government Committee ===
On Apr 29, 2020, The Hong Kong SAR announced the appointments to the Cantonese Opera Advisory Committee which aims to promote the development of Cantonese opera, facilitating the transmission of this world intangible cultural heritage item, for the period from May 1, 2020, to April 30, 2022. Wang is one of the members.

== 2008 Beijing Olympics ==
Wang mentioned that it was good timing to invite the democrats to enter mainland China in time for the 2008 Beijing Olympics.

"CPPCC chairman Jia Qinglin said we should unite people from different sectors – why not include the democrats as well?

— Liza Wang tries to unite the opposing Democrats and Pro-Beijing side in Hong Kong.

The Pro-Beijing party Democratic Alliance for the Betterment of Hong Kong member Tam Yiu Chung responded that the Olympics was not a good reason for changing what the central government used to do. Her concerns baffled her colleagues in the Chinese People's Political Consultative Conference. Democrat member Albert Ho said the issue of a home visit permit was such a rightful thing. It has never been mentioned by any politician but a performer. He appreciates Wang's efforts. Wang is a member, but not a standing committee member of the CPPCC.

== Community work ==
Wang is also known for her philanthropic work, such as donating medical supplies during COVID-19 supply shortages, assisting with distributing funds to Cantonese opera performers affected by the pandemic and donating a portion of ticket sales towards Ren Ci Hospital, where nursing and rehabilitative activities are provided for the elderly and underprivileged. Within Hong Kong, she has also been an MC hosting TVB telethons for Tung Wah Group of Hospitals and many other charities.

Wang, being a two-time cancer survivor (first thyroid then breast cancer), decided to be an executive committee member of the Hong Kong Anti-Cancer Society. A series of informative radio talk shows on RTHK was also hosted where medical specialists were invited to discuss the many types of cancer. She has helped raise charities, awareness and funding for cancer patients. Recently a free concert was given at Tin Shui Wai for 4,500 residents; the concert was filled to capacity and hundreds were turned away. The crowd prevented guest performers like Miriam Yeung and Denise Ho from arriving on time. Denise Ho ascribed the audience overflow to Wang's popularity.

== Personal life ==
Wang was married to businessman Lau Cheong Wah from 1971 to 1983 and they remain good friends. In the late 1980s, she met Law Kar-ying, openly acknowledged as her partner for over twenty years, and whom she married on 2 May 2009 in Las Vegas. Being a native Shanghainese, Wang speaks fluent Shanghainese and has always identified as a Shanghainese.

=== The nickname of "Wang Ah-Tag" owing to social media usage ===
In recent years, Wang has increased her usage in social media. However, upon uploading the photos with others, she has been handwriting the names of others on the photos. These handwritings have been occasionally described as "Wang Ah-Tag".

== Filmography ==
=== Television series ===
Year	Title	Role
1974	Eternal Spring 永恆的春天	Mao Yuin Yuin 毛圓圓
1975	The Golden Chrysanthemum 金葉菊	Chow Yuk Sin 周玉仙
1975	Lady with the Lute 趙五娘	Zhiu Ng Niong 趙五娘
1975	Legend of the Purple Hairpin 紫釵記	Fok Siu Yuk 霍小玉
1976	The Legend of the Book and the Sword 書劍恩仇錄	Fok-ching-tung 霍青桐
1977	A House Is Not a Home 家變	Lok Lam 洛琳
1978	The Heaven Sword and Dragon Saber 倚天屠龙记	Chiu Man 趙敏
1979	Over the Rainbow 天虹	Leung Pui-yee 梁沛怡
1979	Chor Lau-heung 楚留香	Shum Wai-san 沈慧珊
1980	Yesterday's Glitter 京華春夢	Ho Yin-chau 賀燕秋
1980	The Shell Game 千王之王	Tam Siu-tong 譚小棠
1981	Young's Female Warrior 楊門女將	Muk Gui-yin 穆桂英
1981	The Shell Game II 千王群英會	Tam Siu-tong 譚小棠
1982	Love and Passion 萬水千山總是情	Chong Mung-deep 莊夢蝶
1984	Qiu Jin: A Woman To Remember 秋瑾	Qiu Jin 秋瑾
1999	At the Threshold of an Era 創世紀	Fong Kin-ping 方健平
2000	At the Threshold of an Era II 創世紀 II	Fong Kin-ping 方健平
2001	The Awakening Story 婚前昏後	Lam Ho Suet 林皓雪
2004	Blade Heart 血薦軒轅	Tong Bik 唐碧
2005	Wars of In-Laws 我的野蠻奶奶	Hei Tap-Lap Shek Lan 喜塔臘鑠蘭
2005	The Unforgettables 名曲滿天星	
2006	When Rules Turn Loose 識法代言人	Suen Man-Yee 孫敏儀
2006	Glittering Days 東方之珠	Gam Yin 金燕
2008	Wars of In-Laws II 野蠻奶奶大戰戈師奶	Gwo Bik 戈碧
2008	When Easterly Showers Fall on the Sunny West 東山飄雨西關晴	Chong Fung-yi 莊鳳儀
2010	OL Supreme 女王辦公室	Lui Siu-fung 雷小鳳
2010–2011	Home Troopers 居家兵團	Lai Ka-ka 黎嘉嘉
2011	Super Snoops 荃加福祿壽探案	Sun Chiu-tung 辛潮彤
2012	Divas in Distress 巴不得媽媽	Sheung Ying-hung 商映紅
2014	Come On, Cousin 老表，你好hea！	Herself
2015	Limelight Years 華麗轉身	Wah Fong-ying 華芳凝
2015	Master of Destiny 風雲天地	Kwan Yeuk-nam 關若男
2018	Heart and Greed 溏心风暴3	Heung Ching Yi 向清沂
2018	My Ages Apart 誇世代	Sheung Hing Chong 尚慶莊
2019	Flying Tiger II 飛虎之雷霆極戰	何惠英

=== Films ===
- 1969 Singing Darlings
- 1980 Miss Not Home
- 197i The Sausage Chase
- 1979 Full Moon Scimitar
- 2015 ATM

== Accolades ==
=== Awards ===
Year	Award	Category	Series	Result
1999	TVB Anniversary Awards	All-Time Most Memorable Female Leading Roles	A House is not a Home	Won
2000	TVB Anniversary Awards	My Favourite Television Character	At the Threshold of an Era II	Won
2001	TVB Anniversary Awards	Best Actress	The Awakening Story	Won
2001	TVB Anniversary Awards	My Favourite Television Character	The Awakening Story	Won
2005	TVB Anniversary Awards	Best Actress	Wars of In-Laws	Won
2010	TVB Anniversary Awards	Best Host	Fun With Liza and Gods	Won
2015	Starhub TVB Awards	Best Actress	Limelight Years	Won
2015	Starhub TVB Awards	Best Host	Sunday Songbird	Won

=== Honors ===
- Silver Bauhinia Star (2004)
- TVB Best Actress (2001, 2005)
- RTHK Gold Needle Award (2005)
- Mont Blanc de la Culture International Award (2007)

Awards and achievements
TVB Anniversary Awards
Preceded by Carol Cheng for War of the Genders	Best Actress; 2001 for The Awakening Story	Succeeded by Flora Chan for Family Man
Preceded by Gigi Lai for War and Beauty	Best Actress; 2005 for Wars of In-laws	Succeeded by Charmaine Sheh for Maidens' Vow
RTHK Top 10 Chinese Golden Songs Award
Preceded by Richard Lam	Golden Needle Award; 2004	Succeeded by Hong Kong Chinese Orchestra
