= Calvin Wooster =

Methodist minister

- Born: May 20, 1771; Woodbury, Connecticut, United States
- Died: November 6, 1798 (aged 27)

Hezekiah Calvin Wooster (20 May 1771 – 6 November 1798) was a circuit rider in the Methodist Episcopal Church. He was one of the first Methodists to preach in Upper Canada, where his straightforward style of preaching that appealed to direct emotional connection to God allowed him to convert many of the inhabitants.

== Early life and conversion ==
Wooster was born on 30 May 1771 in Woodbury, Connecticut. Around 1787, he moved with his family to Westerlo, New York. He was convicted of sin on 9 October 1791, and subsequently became a born again Christian on 1 December 1791. Wooster's conversion was completed by sanctification on 6 February 1792.

== Ministry ==
Wooster was accepted on trial for the Methodist itinerary at the 1793 conference, and assigned to ride the Granville Circuit in Massachusetts. After a few months on the Granville circuit, he was reassigned to the Pittsfield circuit. After another few months, he was again reassigned, this time to the Cambridge circuit. In 1794, Wooster was assigned to the Elizabeth Town Circuit in New Jersey. At the 1795 conference in White Plains, New York, Wooster's trial period was ended, and he was given his deacon's orders. That year he was assigned to the Columbia Circuit in New York.

In 1796, Wooster volunteered to ride in Upper Canada, and was assigned to the Oswegotchie Circuit. He travelled north with fellow circuit rider Samuel Coate, reaching the quarterly meeting of the Upper Canada district after a twenty-one-day journey through a lightly populated wilderness. There Wooster met the presiding elder Darius Dunham. At the end of the day's public business, Dunham retired with the other conference leaders to discuss organisational matters. Wooster remained behind talking to those who remained in the meeting room, proselytizing to them that they should find full redemption in the blood of Christ. Many were quite stirred by his preaching, and shouting and praised God aloud, while others were so overcome with emotion that they fell prostrate to the floor. The commotion attracted the attention of Dunham, who rushed back to the meeting room to investigate. Dunham, a "fire and brimstone" preacher, was indignant to find many of the Methodists on the floor in emotional outburst. He began praying loudly, for God to put a stop to "the raging of the wild fire." Wooster knelt beside him, and prayed "Lord Bless brother Dunham!" The pair prayed against each other for several minutes, before Dunham was overcome and also fell to the floor in emotional outburst. Afterwards, Dunham adopted much of the theological bent towards emotional preaching and theatrics of Wooster.

Although Wooster was a preacher of significant faith and fervor, he had a poor constitution, and after circuiting riding in Upper Canada through June 1798, he returned to his parent home ill, suffering from tuberculosis, and died on 6 November 1798.

Circuit rider Lorenzo "Crazy" Dow visited Wooster on his deathbed, and was inspired to follow Wooster's example, and volunteer to be sent to Upper Canada. There he preached numerous sermons around Kingston, often centering on what he maintained were Wooster's last words: "Ye must be sanctified or damned".

== Preaching style ==
Wooster preached in a simple, straightforward style, employing common language which allowed him to appeal widely to people unfamiliar with theology. Where John Wesley had written that sanctification must come from solemn spiritual reflection, Wooster preached that sanctification was achieved by being smitten by God, which was a strong, emotional experience. As a consequence, Wooster was able to effectively preach to common folk not well acquainted with religious doctrine, and often induced emotional outbursts from his audience while preaching.

Wooster employed a variety of theatrical devices in his preaching. At one Methodist meeting around the Bay of Quinte, an audience member was arranged to be disruptive, talking and swearing during the sermon. After some time, Wooster pointed at him and exclaimed "My God, smite him!", and the man dutifully dropped straight to the floor. In other cases, he would begin a sermon by descending a ladder, evoking Moses descending from the mount.
