= Home Troopers =

Hong Kong television series

- 居家兵團
- Genre: Drama
- Created by: Lam Chi-wah
- Written by: Yuen Siu-na; Suen Hou-hou
- Starring: Liza Wang; Ha Yu; Kevin Cheng; Bernice Liu; Christine Kuo; Raymond Cho; Vincent Wong; Mandy Wong; Angela Tong
- Theme music composer: Yip Siu-chung
- Opening theme: Hang Fuk Jit Jau (幸福節奏) by Stephanie Ho
- Country of origin: Hong Kong
- Original language: Cantonese
- No. of episodes: 20

Production
- Producer: Lam Chi-wah
- Production location: Hong Kong
- Camera setup: Multi camera
- Running time: approx. 45 minutes (each)
- Production company: TVB

Original release
- Network: TVB Jade
- Release: 27 December 2010 – 21 January 2011

Related
- Twilight Investigation; 7 Days in Life

Home Troopers
- intertitle
- Traditional Chinese: 居家兵團
- Simplified Chinese: 居家兵团
- Literal meaning: "Household Army"
Transcriptions
Standard Mandarin
- Hanyu Pinyin: Jūjiā Bīngtuán
Yue: Cantonese
- Jyutping: Geoi1 Gaa1 Bing1 Tyun4

Home Troopers (Traditional Chinese: 居家兵團) is a 2010–11 Hong Kong television serial drama starring Liza Wang, Ha Yu, Kevin Cheng and Bernice Liu.

Produced by Lam Chi-wah, the series is a TVB production. The drama's original run premiered on 27 December 2010 on Hong Kong's TVB Jade and TVB HD Jade channels.

== Plot ==
The drama follow the lives of the middle class Chukot family, who helps organize a housekeeping business in Hong Kong. The family works through domestic struggles and family changes after eldest son Joseph (Cheng) is left with unpaid company debts handed down by his business partner Fred (Raymond Cho), who mysteriously disappears with the money not long after they started the Master Home Services Company.

Joseph is also left in care for Fred's struggling girlfriend Kam (Liu) and her 4-year-old son, Sing. Joseph's family, led by his mother Ka-ka (Wang), decides to help the business by attending the housekeeping work themselves.

== Synopsis ==
When children are young, their parents are worried they might take the wrong road through life, so they are always by their side, carefully guiding them through life. But as time passes, their children need to learn to become independent, their parents will have to learn to let go. Families have to grow, much like how people have to grow.

The Chukot family is a typical average family. They have always lived together peacefully. Because many things have happened, the situation of the family has changed and many contradictions have appeared..

== Cast and characters ==
- Liza Wang as Lai Ka-ka (黎嘉嘉), a helpful and meticulous housewife who is very protective of her family.
- Ha Yu as Chukot Ho (諸葛河), Ka-ka's husband and a retired civil servant working as hydroelectricity technician. Years before, he planned to open a furniture company with a friend, but backed out after learning that his friend was a swindler through Ka-ka's warning. Nonetheless, he still wishes to open a furniture company of his own in the future.
- Kevin Cheng as Joseph Chukot Ching (諸葛靖), Ka-ka and Ho's 35-year-old son. He is named after Kwok Ching, a fictional character in Jin Yong's wuxia novel The Legend of the Condor Heroes. Originally a well-paid HR manager at a promising real-estate company, Joseph later quits the job due to disagreements with his new boss. He is the co-owner of Master Home Services Company along with Fred, who goes missing not long after the company started.
- Bernice Liu as Tung Kam-po (童金寶), better known as just "Kam", is a struggling 29-year-old single mother left in care for her ex-boyfriend's 4-year-old son. Before becoming Fred's secretary, she worked as a hostess at several seafood and dim sum restaurants. She is surprised at Fred's sudden disappearance but refuses to believe that her boyfriend is a swindler.
- Raymond Cho as Fred Kei Wing-fat (祈永發), co-owner of Master Home Services Company along with Joseph, his high school and college classmate. He later goes missing along with the company's money.
- Mandy Wong as Karen Chukot Yung (諸葛蓉), Ka-ka and Ho's 29-year-old daughter who works as a high school teacher. Ka-ka and Ho named her after Wong Yung, a fictional character in The Legend of the Condor Heroes, in hopes that Karen will be as intelligent and wise as Wong Yung. She is in an on-again, off-again secret relationship with Leo despite knowing that he has a wife.
- Adrian Chau as Benny Chukot Kiu (諸葛喬), Ka-ka and Ho's 19-year-old son and Danny's older twin brother. Like his younger brother, he is named after Kiu Fung, a fictional character in Jin Yong's wuxia novel Demi-Gods and Semi-Devils, in hopes that Benny will have just as much indomitable spirit as Kiu Fung. Benny is currently attending his first year of university studying biology.
- Daniel Chau as Danny Chukot Fung (諸葛峰), Ka-ka and Ho's 19-year-old son and Benny's younger twin brother. Unlike his brother, he failed his college entrance exams twice and often uses his study time to secretly sell ice cream in the streets, a job he enjoys doing.
- Angela Tong as Wah Jing-lek (華晶叻), a Thai Chinese who later helps the Chukot family organize their housekeeping business.
- Vincent Wong as Leo Tong Sau-lai (唐守禮), a surgeon. He has been dating Karen since high school, but the pair broke apart after Ka-ka discovered their relationship. He later marries Tsz-kei due to parental pressure. He reunites with Karen after returning to Hong Kong from his studies and they start an underground relationship.
- Timmy Hung as Cheung Lok-tin (張樂天), a physical education teacher, who has a crush on Karen.
- Christine Kuo as Michelle Kwai Sin-yau (季羡悠), a 25-year-old college teaching assistant and Danny's love interest.
- Kirby Lam as Kimi, a 19-year-old university student, who has a crush on Benny.
- Claire Yiu as Sung Tsz-kei (宋子淇), Leo's wife.
- Peter Lai as Tung Chi (童智), better known as Uncle Chi, is Ah Kam's ex-convict father who specializes in opening locks.

== Awards and nominations ==
=== 45th TVB Anniversary Awards 2011 ===
- Nominated: Best Drama
- Nominated: Best Actress (Liza Wang)
- Nominated: Most Improved Female Artiste (Mandy Wong)

== Viewership ratings ==
The following is a table that includes a list of the total ratings points based on television viewership. "Viewers in millions" refers to the number of people, derived from TVB Jade average ratings (not including TVB HD Jade), in Hong Kong who watched the episode live. The peak number of viewers are in brackets.

Week	Episode(s)	Average points	Peaking points	Viewers (in millions)	AI	References
1	1 — 5	26	—	1.68 (—)	—	
2	6 — 9	27	32	1.75 (2.07)	—	
3	10 — 14	27	30	1.75 (1.94)	—	
4	15 — 19	29	35			

The story of Home Troopers takes reference from a real story. A post-natal (陪月) company called "Mother's Angel Care Service Company"(好安心專業陪月服務有限公司) is run by a family. During the process of designing the characters, this family was interviewed by the director, story writer and script writer.
