= Calvin Petrie =

Montserratian association football player and mixed martial arts (MMA) fighter

Personal information
- Full name: Calvin Valen Leo Petrie
- Date of birth: 9 February 1984 (age 42)
- Place of birth: Hackney, England
- Position: Defender

Team information
- Current team: Epping Town

Senior career*
Years	Team	Apps	(Gls)
2006–2007	Haringey Borough		
2007–2008	Wingate & Finchley	6	(1)
2008	Waltham Abbey		
2008	Waltham Forest		
2014	Williamstown SC		
2014–2015	FC Romania		
2015–20??	Shoreham		
2018	Barkingside	3	(0)
2019	Stotfold	2	(0)
2019–	Epping Town		

International career^{‡}
2011–2019	Montserrat	8	(0)
- * Club domestic league appearances and goals as of 11:19, 23 March 2018 (UTC) ‡ National team caps and goals as of 15:52, 13 October 2019 (UTC)

Calvin Valen Leo Petrie (born 9 February 1984) is a Montserratian international footballer and former mixed martial artist who plays for English club Epping Town, as a defender.

== Career ==
=== Football ===
He has played club football for Haringey Borough, Wingate & Finchley, Waltham Abbey, Waltham Forest, Williamstown SC, FC Romania, Shoreham, Barkingside, Stotfold and Epping Town.

He made his international debut for Montserrat in 2011.

=== Mixed martial arts ===
Petrie began fighting in 2012, and went 3–0 as an amateur before two professional MMA fights in 2016, finishing with a record of 1–1.

== Mixed martial arts record ==
Professional record breakdown
2 matches	1 win	1 loss
By knockout	1	1
Draws	0	
No contests	0	

Res.	Record	Opponent	Method	Event	Date	Round	Time	Location	Notes
Win	1–1	Ben Reeve	TKO (punches)	UCMMA 49	12 November 2016	1	0:23	London, England	
Loss	0–1	Benjamin Veverita	KO (punch)	UCMMA 48	3 September 2016	1	N/A	London, England	
