= 1978 RTHK Top 10 Gold Songs Awards =

Hong Kong music awards ceremony

The 1978 RTHK Top 10 Gold Songs Awards (Chinese: 第一屆十大中文金曲頒獎典禮) was held in 1979 for the 1978 music season.

== Top 10 song awards ==
The top 10 songs (十大中文金曲) of 1978 are as follows.

Song name in Chinese	Artist	Composer	Lyricist
小李飛刀	Roman Tam	Joseph Koo	Jimmy Lo Kwok Tsim
小村之戀	Teresa Teng	うすいよしのり	Zhuang Nu
每當變幻時	Fanny Wang (薰妮)	Koga Masao	Jimmy Lo Kwok Tsim
明日話今天	Jenny Tseng	Yasushi Nakamura (中村泰士)	Jimmy Lo Kwok Tsim
風雨同路	Paula Tsui	Kyōhei Tsutsumi	Cheng Kwok Kong
倚天屠龍記	Adam Cheng	Joseph Koo	Wong Jim
誓要入刀山	Adam Cheng	Joseph Koo	Wong Jim
賣身契	Samuel Hui	Samuel Hui	Samuel Hui Peter Lai
願君心記取	Teresa Cheung	Joseph Koo	Jimmy Lo Kwok Tsim
鱷魚淚	Lisa Yuen Lai Sheung (袁麗嫦)	Wong Jim	Wong Jim
