= Calvin M. Miller =

American professor of political science (born 1924)

Calvin M. Miller (born 1924) was a professor of political science at Jackson State University and Virginia State University.

== Biography ==
Miller was born in Alabama, United States, in 1924, and studied at Morehouse University. He earned a master's degree in political science from the New School for Social Research and a doctorate from Lehigh University, Pennsylvania. He started teaching political science at Tuskegee University in Tuskegee, Alabama, followed by a career teaching at Jackson State University (JSU) in Jackson, Mississippi, and Virginia State University (VSU). Miller died on December 4, 2007.

During his career as a scholar, teacher and advocate, Miller spoke out for democracy, calling for increased student participation, especially African-American students.
