= Calvin Hunt =

Calvin Hunt may refer to:

- Calvin Hunt (artist) (born 1956), Canadian First Nations artist
- Calvin Hunt (American football) (born 1947), former American football player
- Calvin Hunt (singer) (1957–2009), American Christian singer
