= Calvin Lo =

Hong Kong businessperson

- 盧啟賢
- Born: Vancouver, British Columbia, Canada
- Education: Queen's University
- Occupation: Businessman

Calvin Lo is a Hong Kong businessman and chief executive officer (CEO) of RE Lee International, an insurance brokerage firm based Hong Kong.

== Early life and education ==
Lo was born in Vancouver, British Columbia, Canada. He studied at Queen's University and graduated in 1999.

== Career ==
Early in his career, Lo worked in the investment banking division at JPMorgan from 2001 to 2002. Later, he joined his family's business, R.E. Lee International, which was founded in 1954. He also briefly served on the Jane Goodall Institute's board of trustees.

In May 2022, Lo launched an investment fund in Hong Kong named Legacy Jewellery Fund.

In July 2023, a Forbes investigation stated that it could not verify Lo's wealth or connection with Dorilton Capital and Williams, adding that representatives from those entities said they did not recognize his name. Lo refuted the claims and filed a complaint with the Royal Thai Police against the authors, alleging invasion of privacy, misrepresentation of information, and defamation.

Lo was included in Gafencu magazine's annual "Power List 300", a listing of Hong Kong’s 300 most powerful people, for four consecutive years (2021–2024).
