= Calvin Miller (runner) =

American middle-distance runner

Personal information
- Nickname: Uncle Cal
- Nationality: American
- Born: 5 September 1996 (age 30)
- Height: 6 ft 1 in (185 cm)

Sport
- Sport: Track and Field
- Events: 800 m, 4x800 m, 1,000 m indoor
- College team: The University of Oklahoma

Calvin Miller (born 5 September 1996) is an American middle-distance runner who specializes in the 800-meter discipline. He ran collegiately at The University of Oklahoma. He is currently the NCAA Men's Division I Indoor Track and Field Big XII Champion for the 1,000-meter run with a time of 2:30:44.

== Early life ==
Miller was born in Oklahoma City, Oklahoma. He is the son of Rick and Debbie Miller and has a brother, Jack. In high school, Miller served as president of the student council, he was a three-time Masonic Award winner and a member of Senior Council and National Honor Society. At the end of his senior year, Miller also won the prestigious Mr. Westmoore Award.

== Running career ==
=== High school ===
Miller attended Westmoore High School. At Westmoore, he was the State Runner-up in the 4x800-meter and 800-meter his junior year. He would go on to win both events at State in his senior season. In 2013 he was awarded the OSSAA Academic All-State. Miller also ran cross country. He originally committed to Tulsa University but then said "nah" and switched to the University of Oklahoma.

=== Collegiate ===
Miller attended The University of Oklahoma and was on an athletic scholarship. He majored in Chemistry and was also a member of the President's Leadership Class at OU. While in college, Miller has competed in the 800 meter, 4x800-meter relay, 1,000-meter, and the mile run in indoor and outdoor track and field.

== Awards ==
Awards and Nominations
Year	Award	Category	Result
2014	OSSAA 6A State Championship	4x800 meter relay	Runner-Up
2014	OSSAA 6A State Championship	800 meter	Runner-Up
2015	OSSAA 6A State Championship	4x800 meter relay	Won
2015	OSSAA 6A State Championship	800 meter	Won
2015	Jim Thorpe Player of the Year Award	Track and Field	Won
2018	BIG XII Indoor Track and Field Championship	1000 meter run	Won
2018	OU ESPYs	Breakout Athlete	Nominated
2018	OU ESPYs	Unsung Hero Award	Nominated
