= 15th Golden Horse Awards =

1978 Taiwanese film awards ceremony

- Date: October 31, 1978
- Site: Zhongshan Hall, Taipei, Taiwan
- Hosted by: Wang Hao; Ivy Ling
- Organized by: Taipei Golden Horse Film Festival Executive Committee

Highlights
- Best Feature Film: He Never Gives Up
- Best Director: Li Hsing; He Never Gives Up
- Best Actor: Chin Han; He Never Gives Up
- Best Actress: Tien Niu; The Diary of Di-Di
- Most awards: He Never Gives Up (5)
- Most nominations: He Never Gives Up (11)

The 15th Golden Horse Awards (Mandarin:第15屆金馬獎) took place on October 31, 1978, at Zhongshan Hall in Taipei, Taiwan.

== Winners and nominees ==
Winners are listed first, highlighted in boldface.

**Best Feature Film**: **He Never Gives Up**; Brothers (runner-up); The Operations of Spring Wind (runner-up - mention); The Sentimental Swordsman (runner-up - mention); The Murder of Murders (runner-up - mention); Everlasting Love (runner-up - mention); Sunset in Beijing City (runner-up - mention); The Contract (runner-up); The Glory of the Sunset (runner-up); The Diary of Di-Di (runner-up); Lantern Festival Adventure (runner-up); The Smiling Face (runner-up - mention)	**Best Documentary**: **Zhong Hua Min Guo Di Liu Ren Zong Tong Fu Zong Tong Xuan Shi Jiu Zhi Dian Li**; Tian Yuan Zu Qu (runner-up); Sha Rang Li De Bai Yu (runner-up); Wu Ling Yu Ci Hu (runner-up); Guo Jia Zhong Yao Gong Cheng Jian She Yu Rong Min Gong Cheng Shi Ye (runner-up); Yi Dai Wei Ren (runner-up - mention); Zhong Hua Min Guo Liu Shi Liu Nian Tai Wan Qu Yun Dong Hui (runner-up - mention); Fei Xiang Bai Ri Qing Tian (runner-up - mention); Hai Shang Gong Yuan ─ Jin Men (runner-up - mention); Kang Zhuang Da Dao (runner-up - mention)
**Best Director**: **Li Hsing — He Never Gives Up**; Chen Yao-chi — The Diary of Di-Di; Michael Hui — The Contract	**Best Leading Actor**: **Chin Han — He Never Gives Up**; Bai Ying — The Operations of Spring Wind; Jimmy Wang — Brothers
**Best Leading Actress**: **Tien Niu — The Diary of Di-Di**; Joan Lin — He Never Gives Up; Chen Chen — The Glory of the Sunset	**Best Supporting Actor**: **Ku Ming-lun — Sunset in Beijing City**; Wei Su — Everlasting Love; Ting Kwok-sing — He Never Gives Up
**Best Supporting Actress**: **Gua Ah-leh — The Diary of Di-Di**; Lisa Lu — Everlasting Love; Chin Chi-min — Love of the White Snake	**Best Child Star**: **Huang Yi-lung — Lantern Festival Adventure**; Huang Ying-hsun — Sunset in Beijing City; Chen Jun-jie — He Never Gives Up
**Best Screenplay**: **Chang Yung-hsiang — He Never Gives Up**; Liu Chia-chang — Sunset in Beijing City; Sima Zhongyuan — Lantern Festival Adventure	**Best Cinematography**: **Chen Kun-hou — He Never Gives Up**; Lin Chao — The Dream of the Red Chamber; Lin Wen-chin — The Diary of Di-Di
**Best Film Editing**: **Peter Cheung — The Contract**; Liao Ching-sung — He Never Gives Up; Wang Chi-yang — The Operations of Spring Wind	**Best Art Direction**: **Chen Ching-shen — The Dream of the Red Chamber**; Li Ji — Lantern Festival Adventure; Wang Toon — The Glory of the Sunset
**Best Music**: **Huang Mao-shan — Lantern Festival Adventure**; Weng Ching-hsi — He Never Gives Up; Wu Ta-chiang — The Dream of the Red Chamber	**Best Sound Recording**: **Lin Kun-chi — The Glory of the Sunset**; Lin Ting-kuei — The Operations of Spring Wind; Hsin Chiang-sheng — He Never Gives Up
**Best Cinematography for Documentary**: **Chen Yu-po - Zhong Hua Min Guo Di Liu Ren Zong Tong Fu Zong Tong Xuan Shi Jiu Zhi Dian Li**; Liao Hung-ya — Tian Yuan Zu Qu; Yu Ju-chi — Kang Zhuang Da Dao	**Best Planning for Documentary**: **Tuan Mu-hsuan — Tian Yuan Zu Qu**; Liang Kai-ming — Sha Rang Li De Bai Yu; Hsu I-kung — Wu Ling Yu Ci Hu
**Special Award - Outstanding Performance**: **Chen Jun-jie - He Never Gives Up**	**Special Award - Outstanding Cinematography**: **The Sentimental Swordsman**
**Special Award - News Values Award**: **Fei Xiang Bai Ri Qing Tian**
