= Clifton Ko =

Hong Kong film director

Clifton Ko MH
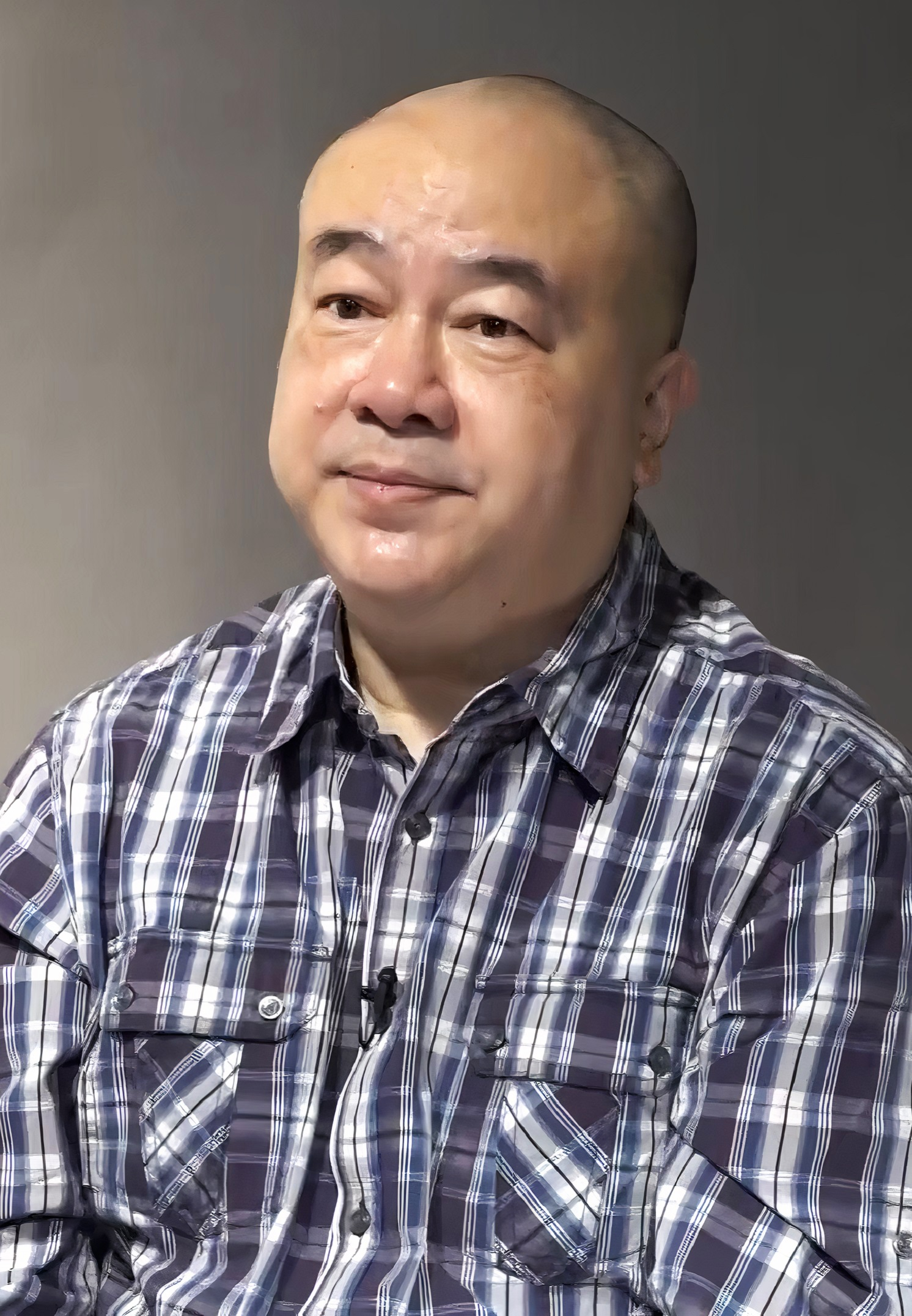
- Interviewed by Chinanews.com in 2020
- Born: Ko Chi-sum; 6 August 1958 (age 67); Hong Kong
- Partner: Perry Chiu
- Awards: Golden Horse Awards – Best Editing; 1997 Legend of Mad Phoenix

Chinese name
- Traditional Chinese: 高志森
- Simplified Chinese: 高志森
Transcriptions

Clifton Ko MH (Chinese: 高志森; Jyutping: gou1 zi3 sam1; born 6 August 1958) is a Hong Kong film director, actor, producer, and scriptwriter.

== Background ==
Clifton Ko graduated from Kwun Tong Maryknoll College, and entered the TV and film industry in late 1970s, first working with director Clifford Choi. In this period, he wrote Choi's No U-Turn (1981) and Teenage Dreamers (檸檬可樂; Ling mung hoh lok; 'Lemon Cola') (1982), as well as John Woo's comedy Once a Thief (1991). In 1982, Ko entered Raymond Wong's newly founded Cinema City & Films Co., and directed his first film The Happy Ghost in 1984. The film series, like all his major works, is a slapstick comedy with moral teachings, family values, and optimism. Ko, together with the company, is prolific in making "Chinese New Year movies". Important titles include the family comedy series It's a Mad, Mad, Mad World (beginning in 1987); Chicken and Duck Talk, a collaboration with comedian/writer Michael Hui; the ensemble comedy series All's Well, Ends Well (beginning in 1992); and It's a Wonderful Life (1994).

== Filmography as director ==
Year	Title	Awards
2018	Dearest Anita	Best Director, 14th Chinese American Film Festival
2017	All My Goddess	
2014	Wonder Mama	Outstanding Film, Chinese American Film Festival
2006	We Are Family	
2004	Forever Yours	
2004	In-Laws, Out-Laws	
2000	Funny Business	
2000	Love Paradox	
2000	Winner Takes All	
1998	Ninth Happiness	
1997	Hong Kong Adventure	
1997	The Mad Phoenix	Golden Horse (nominee), Best Feature Film, Best Director
1995	The Umbrella Story	
1995	Paradise Hotel	
1994	One of the Lucky Ones	
1994	It's a Wonderful Life	
1994	I Will Wait for You	
1994	I Have a Date with Spring	
1993	All's Well, Ends Well Too	
1993	Laughter of the Water Margins	
1992	Summer Lovers	
1992	It's a Mad, Mad, Mad World Too	
1992	All's Well, Ends Well	
1991	The Banquet	
1991	The Gambling Ghost	
1991	Daddy, Father and Papa	
1989	Mr. Coconut	
1989	How to Be a Billionaire	
1989	Happy Ghost 4	
1989	City Squeeze	
1988	It's a Mad, Mad, Mad World 2	
1988	Chicken and Duck Talk	
1987	It's a Mad, Mad, Mad World	
1986	Devoted to You	
1986	Porky's Meatballs	
1985	Happy Ghost II	
1984	Happy Ghost	
1984	Merry Christmas	

== Personal life ==
During the 2019 Anti-Extradition Law Amendment Bill protests and the subsequent imposition of the Hong Kong national security law in 2020, Ko expressed support for the Hong Kong Police Force.
