= Who Is the Craftiest =

1988 Hong Kong film by Poon Man-kit

- Film poster
- Traditional Chinese: 奸人本色
- Simplified Chinese: 奸人本色
- Hanyu Pinyin: Jiān Rén Běn Sè
- Jyutping: Gaan1 Jan4 Bun2 Sik1
- Directed by: Poon Man-kit
- Written by: Leung Lap-yan
- Produced by: Leung Lap-yan
- Starring: Ricky Hui; Bill Tung; Tang Pik-wan; Sammy Cheung; Tiffany Lau; Keung Chung-ping; Lo Hoi-pang
- Cinematography: Yu Chun
- Edited by: Fan Kung-ming
- Music by: Anders Nelsson; Stephen Shing
- Distributed by: Golden Harvest
- Release date: 1 January 1988
- Running time: 87 minutes
- Country: Hong Kong
- Language: Cantonese
- Box office: HK$3,193,219

Who Is the Craftiest is a 1988 Hong Kong comedy film directed by Poon Man-kit and starring Ricky Hui, Bill Tung, Tang Pik-wan, Sammy Cheung, Tiffany Lau, Keung Chung-ping and Lo Hoi-pang.

== Cast ==
- Ricky Hui as Mon
- Bill Tung as Leung Piu
- Tang Pik-wan as Mrs. Kang / Mita Sudan
- Sammy Cheung as Kang Chuen
- Tiffany Lau as Siu Wan / Winnie
- Keung Chung-ping as Kang Chung Ping
- Lo Hoi-pang as Police sergeant Pang
- Fung King-man as Kang's family member
- Yu Mo-lin as Kang's family member
- Cheung Hei as Letter writer
- Leung Oi as Kang's family member
- Shirley Gwan as Susan
- Amy Yip as Club girl
- Yeung Yau-cheung as Kang's family member
- Ho Pak-kwong as Kang's family servant
- Mai Kei as Brother Wah
- Chan Kim-wang as Superintendent KK Wong
- Ben Wong Tin-tok
- Leung Hak-shun as Jewelry store's staff
- Ling Lai-man as Manager Wong of jewelry store
- Thomas Sin as Wedding car driver
- Yung Sau-yee
- Tony Tam as Cop
- Chin Lai-yee
- Luk Ying-hung as policeman
- Lam Foo-wai as Fake cop
- Ng Kwok-kin as policeman
- Ho Chi-moon as Passerby
- Kingson Shek as Cop

== Box office ==
This film grossed HK$3,193,219 during its theatrical run from 1 January to 7 January 1988 in Hong Kong.
