= The Last Message =

1975 Hong Kong film by Michael Hui

- DVD cover
- Directed by: Michael Hui
- Written by: Michael Hui; Lau Tin-chi; Louis Sit
- Produced by: Raymond Chow
- Starring: Michael Hui; Samuel Hui
- Cinematography: Cheung Yiu-cho; Yu Chun
- Edited by: Peter Cheung
- Music by: Samuel Hui; Joseph Koo
- Distributed by: Golden Harvest
- Release date: 21 August 1975
- Running time: 98 minutes
- Country: British Hong Kong
- Language: Cantonese
- Box office: HK$4,553,662

The Last Message
- Traditional Chinese: 天才與白痴
- Simplified Chinese: 天才与白痴
- Literal meaning: "The Genius and the Idiot"
Transcriptions
Standard Mandarin
- Hanyu Pinyin: Tián Cái Yú Bái Chī
Yue: Cantonese
- Jyutping: Tin1 Coi4 Jyu2 Baak6 Ci1

The Last Message (Chinese: 天才與白痴) is a 1975 Hong Kong comedy film directed by and starring Michael Hui, and co-starring Samuel Hui, with a cameo appearance by Ricky Hui. This is the second film of the Hui Brothers.

== Plot ==
Tim (Michael Hui) and Lee (Samuel Hui) are employees of a mental hospital working as an orderly and nurse respectively. One day a crazy man named Cheng Ming (Roy Chiao) is institutionalized who carries a bag of trash. Tim and Lee discover that the bag is full of artifacts from the Ming Dynasty. Unfortunately, they are all broken pieces and cannot be traded for money. Then, Cheng talks about a Princess and Tim and Lee figure that Cheng knows where are the artifacts from. Later on, Cheng dies from heart attack and Tim and Lee find Princess (Eileen Humphreys) and find out that she is Cheng's daughter. Princess tells them that her father discovered a sunk boat at the coast of Hong Kong. Tim and Lee starts to plan for their luxurious life, including quitting their jobs, and set out to find the artifacts. They do discover tons of it and brings it to trade for money. However, the ones Tim and Lee find are revealed to be fakes. With their fancy of luxury over, Lee gets his job back and Tim got insane and became a mental patient.

== Cast ==
- Michael Hui as Tim
- Samuel Hui as Nurse Lee
- Ricky Hui as waiter on skate
- James Tien as traffic cop
- Roy Chiao as Cheng Ming
- Ray Cordeiro as Policeman
- Dean Shek as hotel clerk
- Eileen Humphreys as Princess
- Lau Yat-fan as Police Chief
- Chiang Nan as antique dealer
- Siu Kam as Arab bodyguard
- Wong Sam as Dr. Wong
- Fung Ngai as Mr. Chow
- Joseph Koo as doctor in operation
- Tsang Cho-lam as schizo, Chan Keung
- Hao Li-jen as mental patient, dies in bed
- Ho Pak-kwong as hospital attendant with crabs and frogs
- Ching Siu-tung as student scuba diver
- Fung King-man as mental patient, Barbitone
- Kam Lau as Tim's mother
- Chu Yau-ko as mental patient, eating disorder
- Sai Gwa-Pau as mental patient, likes death
- Hong Ka-yan as Nurse
- To Sam-ku as Ms. Chow
- The Lotus as band
- Luk Chin as Catholic priest at hospital

== Partial soundtrack ==
Tin choi yu bak chi (天才與白痴) is an album by Samuel Hui, released in 1975 by Polydor Records in Hong Kong. The first four tracks of the album are heard in the film.

Side one
No.	Title	Lyrics	Music	English translation	Length
1.	"天才與白痴" (tin choi yu bak chi)	Sam Hui, Louis Sit 薛志雄	Sam Hui	The Genius and the Idiot
2.	"天才白痴往日情" (tin choi bak chi wong yat ching)	Samuel Hui, Louis Sit	Sam Hui	Old Love
3.	"天才白痴錢錢錢" (tin choi bak chi cheen cheen cheen)	Samuel Hui, Louis Sit	Sam Hui	Cash, Cash, Cash
4.	"天才白痴夢" (tin choi bak chi mung)	Samuel Hui, Louis Sit	Sam Hui	Dreams
5.	"情人離別去" (ching yaan lei bit heui)	Ricky Hui	Paul Vance, Eddie Snyder (Note: Rendition of the 1963 song "What Will Mary Say" by Johnny Mathis)	Farewell, Lover
6.	"青春夢裡人" (ching cheun mung leui yaan)	Sam Hui	Ken Tobias (Note: Rendition of the 1970 song "Stay Awhile" by The Bells)	Dreams of a Young

Side two
No.	Title	Lyrics	Music	English translation	Length
7.	"獨上西樓" (dook seung sai lau)	Sam Hui	Barry Gibb, Robin Gibb (Note: Rendition of the 1967 song "Holiday" by the Bee Gees)	Lonely at the West Tower
8.	"齊齊唱首歌" (chai chai cheung sau gaw)	Sam Hui	Sam Hui	The Choir Sings
9.	"莫等待" (mok dang doi)	Sam Hui	Sam Hui	Don't Wait
10.	"歡樂桃源" (foon lok tou yuen)	Ricky Hui	Ricky Hui	Joy in Taoyuan
11.	"故苑懷舊" (koo yuen wai gau)	Ricky Hui	Ricky Hui	Vintage Estate
12.	"天才白痴往日情(音樂)"			Old Love (instrumental)
