= Hui Brothers Show =

- DVD cover
- Traditional Chinese: 雙星報喜
- Simplified Chinese: 双星报喜
- Literal meaning: Double Stars Announce the Delightful News
- Hanyu Pinyin: Shuāng Xīng Bào Xǐ
- Jyutping: Seong1 Sing1 Bou3 Hei2
- Genre: Sketch comedy
- Screenplay by: Thomas Tang; Lau Tin-chi; Lee Chau-ping
- Directed by: Selina Chow; Ng Wai-ping
- Starring: Michael Hui; Samuel Hui
- Country of origin: Hong Kong
- Original language: Cantonese
- No. of seasons: 2
- No. of episodes: 54

Production
- Producer: Selina Chow
- Production location: Hong Kong
- Cinematography: Yeung Yee-wo
- Editors: Lee Pak-man; Mak Sze-ning
- Camera setup: Multi camera
- Production company: TVB

Original release
- Network: TVB Jade
- Release: 23 April 1971 – 3 February 1973

Hui Brothers Show is a Hong Kong sketch comedy television series produced by TVB and hosted by and starring brothers Michael Hui and Samuel Hui that ran for 54 episodes from 1971 to 1973.

The first episode of Hui Brothers Show was aired on 12 April 1971 as a special program to celebrate Easter and was very well received. As a result, TVB decided to turn it into a regular program which began airing its first season 11 days later on 23 April on Friday nights. The first season ended on 15 October 1971 with a total of 27 episodes including its first episode aired on Easter. The show featured a fresh style and exquisite content including machines gun delivery of jokes. After the end of the first season, audiences wrote letters to TVB requesting the extension of the show. As a result, the show was re-aired on Sunday mornings at the end of 1971.

The second season premiered on 14 April 1972. This season took inspiration from the American sketch comedy show, Laugh-In, featuring sitcom and Hong Kong English pop music sung by Samuel Hui. This season featured Samuel's famed Cantonese song, Tit Taap Ling Wan (鐵塔凌雲, literally translated as Steel Tower rise above the clouds), which featured lyrics written by Michael. Season 2 ended 6 October of the same year with a total of 26 episodes.

Four months later, the final episode of Hui Brothers Show was aired on 3 February 1973 as a special program to celebrate Chinese New Year.

== Notable guest stars ==
=== Season 1 (1971) ===
- Nancy Sit
- Roy Chiao
- Patrick Tse
- Tang Pik-wan
- Fung Tak-luk
- Wu Yan-yan
- Sai Gwa-Pau
- Richard Ng
- Stanley Fung
- Leung Tin
- Adam Cheng
- Sylvia Lai
- Cheung Ying
- Josephine Siao
- Lydia Shum
- Maggie Li
- Fung-wong Nui
- Chu Mu
- Chow Kat
- Wong Oi-ming
- Ma Siu-ying
- Betty Chung
- Yung Yuk-yee
- Law Kwok-hung
- Wong Wan-choi
- Chan Lap-pan
- Angela Mao
- Mang Lei
- Lee Sin-wan (Hui's mother)
- Ricky Hui (Hui's brother)

=== Season 2 (1972) ===
- Connie Chan
- Lee Heung-kam
- Tam Ping-man
- Leung Sing-Bor
- Rebecca Pan
- Tina Leung
- Roman Tam
- Li Han-hsiang
- Louise Lee
- Benz Hui
- Lisa Lui
- Kwok Fung
- Frances Yip
- Chan Yau-hau
- Lai Siu-fong
- Yuen Man-lei
- Patrick Lung
- Hui Sau-ying
- Ivan Ho
- Lee Tim-sing
- Leung Tin
- Leung San
- Siu San-yan
- Bonnie Wong
- Fong Ping
- To Shu-ying
- Kong Lai
- Lee To Yat-hin

=== Finale (1973) ===
- The Chopsticks
- Cheng Pei-pei
- Tina Leung
- Roy Chiao

== Songs ==
The end of each episode of the show featured a song sung by Samuel Hui accompanied with a music video.

- I'll Never Fall in Love Again (co-sung with Esther Chan)
- Love Story
- Circle Game
- A Carnation for Rebu
- Both Sides Now
- Your Song
- Kisses Sweeter Than Wine (co-sung with Michael Hui)
- All I Ever Need is You (co-sung with Frances Yip)
- Once There Was a Love
- If I Were a Carpenter (co-sung with Michael Hui)
- My Sweet Lord
- Vincent
- When I'm Sixty Four (co-sung with Michael Hui)
- Morning Has Broken
- Look What They've Done To My Song
- Until It's Time For you To Go
- Too Beautiful to Last
- Beautiful in the Rain
- Interlude
- Windy
- Call Me
- Downtown
- Music To Watch Girls By
- Do You know the Way to San Jose
- My Cherry Amour
- I Say A Little Prayer
- Just a River Separating the Horizon (只是一水隔天涯) + Trace of Love
- What the World Needs Now is Love
- Lingyun Tower (鐵塔凌雲)
- Puppy Song (co-sung with Michael Hui)
- For All We Know (co-sung with Rebecca Fleming)
