= Ray Cordeiro =

Hong Kong broadcaster and DJ (1924–2023)

Ray Cordeiro MBE SBS
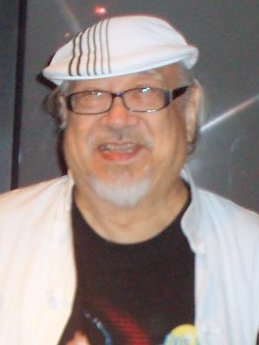
- Cordeiro in 2008
- Born: Reinaldo Maria Cordeiro; 12 December 1924; Wan Chai, Hong Kong
- Died: 13 January 2023 (aged 98); Ma Liu Shui, Hong Kong
- Other name: Uncle Ray
- Occupations: Broadcaster; disc jockey; actor

Chinese name
- Chinese: 郭利民
Transcriptions
Yue: Cantonese
- Yale Romanization: gwok leih màhn
- Jyutping: Gwok^{3} Lei^{6} Man^{4}
- Website: www.uncleraydj.com

Reinaldo Maria Cordeiro MBE SBS (Chinese: 郭利民; 12 December 1924 – 13 January 2023), known professionally as Uncle Ray, was a Hong Kong broadcaster, disc jockey and actor. He was known for hosting All the Way with Ray on RTHK Radio 3 from 1970 to 2021, which was the longest-running radio programme in Hong Kong. He was named "The World's Most Durable DJ" in 2000 by the Guinness Book of World Records.

== Early life and career ==
Born Reinaldo Maria Cordeiro in Wan Chai, Hong Kong, on 12 December 1924, Uncle Ray was one of six siblings. His family descended from Portuguese immigrants to China. Cordeiro's paternal grandfather was born in Shanghai and met his grandmother in the Portuguese colony of Macau, before moving to Hong Kong in 1868. Cordeiro's father was born in Hong Kong while his mother immigrated from Macau to Hong Kong in the early 20th century. His father abandoned the family when Cordeiro was six, leaving his mother to take on extra work to raise the family, which lived in poverty. Cordeiro went to St Francis' Canossian School as a child. He recalled being mocked for his stuttering, which he eventually overcame with the help of his mother.

Cordeiro attended St Joseph's College shortly before World War II. During the war, his mother and sisters moved to Macau while Cordeiro stayed with his father, who worked with HSBC in Hong Kong. In 1943, Cordeiro joined the rest of the family living at a refugee camp in Macau. A big band performed at the camp on New Year's Eve in 1944, which developed Cordeiro's interest in the drums.

After the war, Cordeiro worked as a warden in Stanley Prison. He befriended a young prisoner, but left the job after he refused to help the prisoner escape. On the advice of his father, Cordeiro got a job at HSBC, while also moonlighting as a drummer. He described two jobs as a "pretty good life", though he was "bored to death working at the bank."

== Radio career ==
In 1949, at the age of 25, he started his broadcasting career as a scriptwriter with Radio Rediffusion. He eventually became a DJ and hosted a programme called Progressive Jazz. He joined Radio Television Hong Kong (then known as Radio Hong Kong) in 1960 as a light music producer. In 1970, he started the series All the Way with Ray, the longest-running radio programme in Hong Kong which ran for 51 years until 15 May 2021. He had also cameoed in various Hong Kong films in the 1970s and 80s.

Through the years, Cordeiro had interviewed many prominent musicians, including the Beatles. He was recognised by Elvis Presley Enterprises for his lifelong contribution to Presley. He was voted top DJ in Hong Kong for four consecutive years. He was awarded an MBE in 1987 by Queen Elizabeth II in Buckingham Palace.

Cordeiro received an honorary fellowship from the Hong Kong Academy of Performing Arts in 2012 and an honorary doctorate of Social Science from the Chinese University of Hong Kong in 2022.

On 15 May 2021, Cordeiro retired at the age of 96 after hosting his final radio show, which had been running on public broadcaster RTHK since 1970.

All the Way with Ray: My Autobiography, a career-focused memoir by Cordeiro, was published in 2021 by Hong Kong-based Blacksmith Books.

== Death ==
Cordeiro died at the CUHK Medical Centre in Hong Kong on 13 January 2023, aged 98. Government officials expressed their condolences with the news of his death.

== Programmes hosted ==
=== Radio Rediffusion ===
- Progressive Jazz (1949–1960)
- Talent Time
- The Beginners Please
- The Diamond Music Show
- Shriro Hit Parade
- Rumpus Time (1950s)
- Swing and Sway with Ray (–1960)

=== RTHK ===
- From Me To You
- Hit Parade
- Lucky Dip
- All the Way with Ray (1970 – 15 May 2021)
- Just Jazz with Uncle Ray

== Filmography ==
Year	Title	Role	Notes
1974	Games Gamblers Play		
1975	Let's Rock		
1975	The Last Message	Assassin, policeman	
1976	The Private Eyes		
1981	Security Unlimited	Horse race trickster	
1981	Job Hunter		
1983	All the Wrong Spies	The Jew	
