= Sam Hui =

Hong Kong musician and actor (born 1948)

- 許冠傑
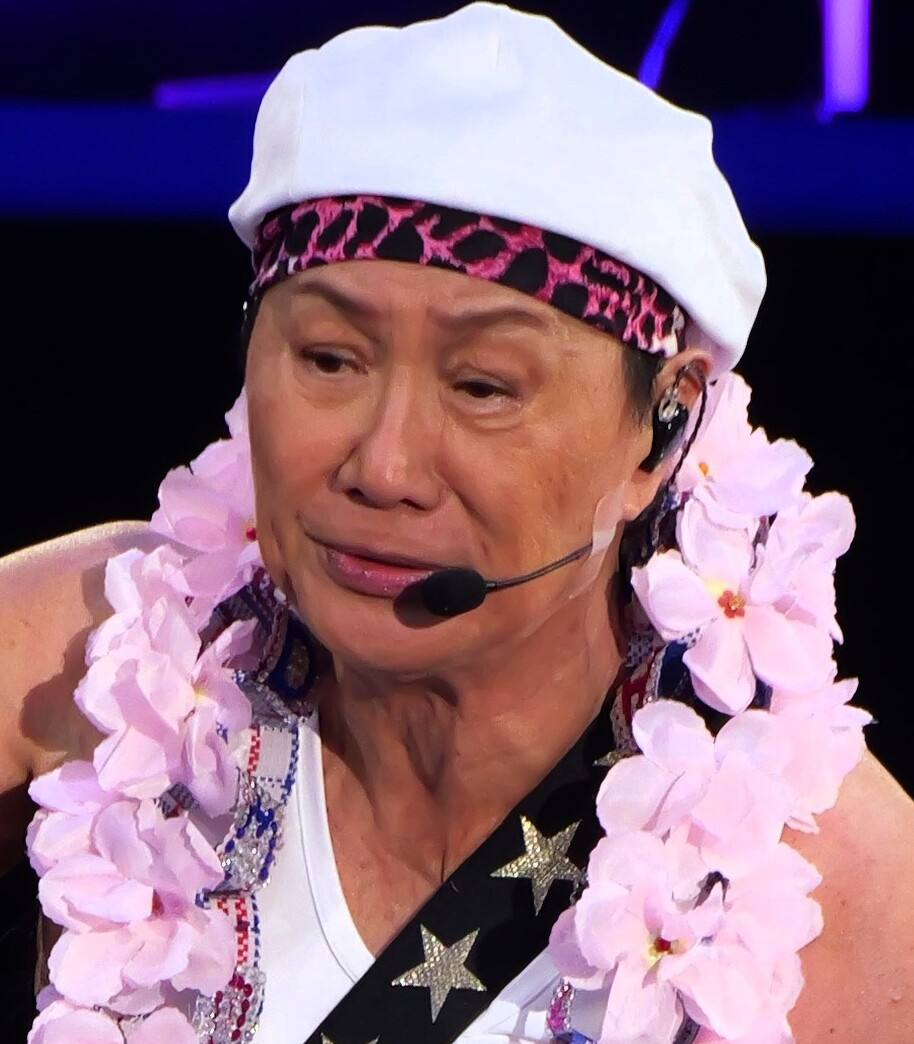
- Hui in 2024
- Born: 6 September 1948 (age 78); Guangzhou, Guangdong, China
- Other names: Hui Koon-kit, Samuel Hui
- Education: The University of Hong Kong (BSocSc, 1971)
- Occupations: Musician; singer; songwriter; record producer; actor
- Years active: 1967–1992; 2003–present
- Spouse: Rebecca Hui (m. 1971)
- Children: 2
- Relatives: Michael Hui (brother); Ricky Hui (brother)
- Awards: Hong Kong Film Awards – Best Original Film Song; 1991 The Swordsman
- Musical career
- Also known as: God of Songs (歌神), Brother Sam
- Origin: Hong Kong
- Genres: Cantopop, Hong Kong English pop
- Instruments: Vocals; guitar
- Labels: Diamond Records (1967); Polydor (1971–1983); Contec Sound (1983–1985); Cinepoly Records (1985–1990); PolyGram (1990–1992); IEC (2007–present)

Chinese name
- Traditional Chinese: 許冠傑
- Simplified Chinese: 许冠杰
Transcriptions
Standard Mandarin
- Hanyu Pinyin: Xǔ Guànjié
Yue: Cantonese
- Jyutping: Heoi2 Gun3git6
- Website: www.samhuiofficial.com

Samuel Hui Koon-kit (born 6 September 1948) is a Hong Kong musician, singer, songwriter and actor. He is credited with popularising Cantopop both via the infusion of Western-style music and his usage of vernacular Cantonese rather than written vernacular Chinese in biting lyrics that addressed contemporary problems and concerns. Hui is considered by some to be the first major superstar of Cantopop, known as the God of Song and alternatively as the Canto-pop godfather and the Elvis Presley of Hong Kong.

As an actor, he is well-known for portraying the main character "King Kong" in five instalments of the Aces Go Places film series.

== Early life ==
Hui was born in Guangzhou, Guangdong, China in 1948. His parents were both musicians; his father was a traditional Chinese musician while his mother was a Chinese opera singer. In 1950, along with his three older brothers, Michael, Ricky, and Stanley, Hui and his parents arrived in Hong Kong as refugees in 1950, originally living in Diamond Hill. Sam Hui attended Ying Wa College and St. Francis Xavier's College, Tai Kok Tsui in the late 1960s and early 1970s, and graduated from the University of Hong Kong with a Bachelor's degree in Social Sciences,

Hui worked with Michael and Ricky on several comedies in the early 1970s. Hui has also gained credit for popularising Cantopop, by incorporating the idiosyncrasies of Western popular music into the old Cantopop genre.

== Career ==
=== Music ===
Hui began his singing career in the 1960s, and signed with Diamond Records in 1967.

His television debut was as a host on a youth music TV show on the TVB network, Hui and his brother Michael hosting the Hui Brothers Show, which premiered on 23 April 1971.

Hui became the lead musician of a band The Lotus.

In the 1970s, Hui performed cover versions of songs popular in Britain and the United States, such as "A Spaceman Came Travelling". He also wrote the theme songs for the comedies produced by his brother, Michael, and later started performing Cantonese songs. Sam Hui's first Cantonese hit, "Eiffel Tower Above the Clouds" (鐵塔凌雲) – originally titled "Here and Now" (就此模樣) – was first played on the Hui Brothers Show in April 1972. Hui signed a contract with Polydor and produced his first single in English, "April Lady".

Hui's first Cantonese album, Games Gamblers Play (Chinese: 鬼馬雙星; Jyutping: gwai2 maa5 soeng1 sing1; Cantonese Yale: gwái máh sēung sīng; lit. 'Ghost Horse (Cantonese slang for "Goofy") Twin Stars'), was the partial soundtrack to the Michael Hui-directed film of the same name. This album became popular, selling 200,000 copies, and was one of the major musical works that helped to popularise Cantopop.

Hui's music gained popular appeal, resonating with the working class because of its simplicity and the relevance of the lyrics. A prolific songwriter, a noted recurring theme in his music describing or humorously satirising Hong Kong society and events.

The Private Eyes, the soundtrack to the 1976 film of the same name, in which he also starred, marked Hui's singing and acting break-out. The album humorously reflected on the harsh realities of middle and lower-income Hongkongers – "Song of Water Rationing" (制水歌) referenced the days of water shortage during the 1960s; "Couldn't Care Less About 1997" (話知你97), encouraged Hong Kong people to adopt a carpe diem attitude instead of worrying about the imminent handover to the People's Republic of China on 1 July 1997. While topical in nature and referencing local events, some of his songs are light-hearted, others carried philosophical messages brought out through artful use of Chinese wordplay. Examples can be seen in his farewell song in 1992 and "From the Heart of a Loafer" (浪子心聲), where for Cantopop, the sophisticated language and messages were rare in the lyrics of contemporary artists.

On 17 June 1979, Hui became the first singer from Hong Kong to perform at the Tokyo Music Festival.

=== Film ===
Hui signed a contract with Golden Harvest in 1971. On a personal note, Hui is closer to his middle brother Ricky (deceased 8 November 2011) than to their oldest brother Michael. Sam and Michael reportedly fell out with each other after their pre-1985 successes. However, in Michael's Chicken and Duck Talk (1988), Hui appeared in a short 1-minute cameo, playing the role of himself as master of ceremonies at the grand opening of Danny's Chicken, and contributed to its theme song for its end credits entitled "You Have Your Say" (你有你講). Then in 1990, the three brothers reunited in Front Page, a lampoon on Hong Kong's sometimes over-zealous entertainment news industry. Hui also collaborated with several popular singers such as Leslie Cheung both musically and on-screen culminating in the hit single written by Hui and composed by Cheung entitled Silence is Golden (沉默是金), which Cheung also sung as a solo track on his 1987 album, Hot Summer, as well as the catchy tune, I've Never Been Afraid (我未驚過) in 1989 as the end theme for Aces Go Places 5: The Terracotta Hit.

Hui also starred in the Aces Go Places, a series of Hong Kong action–comedies in the 1980s, with Karl Maka. The theme song for his 1986 action movie Aces Go Places IV a.k.a. Mad Mission 4: You Never Die Twice, was "A Little TLC" with Cantonese lyrics by Lin Zhenqiang (title: "Xin Si Si") and it was one of RTHK's Top 10 Gold Songs in 1986 as well as the winner of the 9th Chinese Golden Melody Awards and "Best Original Film Song" at the second Hong Kong Film Awards.

He suffered from what was thought to be hypoxia in Tibet while filming The Legend of Wisely and became very ill and many of his fans pointed out that this near fatal accident may have been pivotal on his decision to retire as they superstitiously believed that he was haunted by a spirit. It later transpired that Hui had in fact been suffering from carbon monoxide poisoning.

=== Retirement ===
During the late 1980s, Hui's father advised him to retire to avoid the stresses he endured from hosting concerts. His mother purportedly also had reservations about his performing, including that he might injure himself on stage.

A Hong Kong concert in 1990 supposedly marked his early retirement, but was a prelude to a 42-show farewell concert series in 1991 to 1992, including 14 shows in Hong Kong. Around the time of the 30th show, Hui's father died but despite his grief, he continued to host.

Hui also hosted shows in Canada, in Vancouver, at the Pacific Coliseum, and Toronto, Ontario, which he dedicated to his late father. Despite reiterating his plans for retirement, Hui came back for a short stint in the movie Winner Takes All co-starring Nicholas Tse and Ruby Lin. This he maintained, was a result of being unable to ignore his heart's desire.

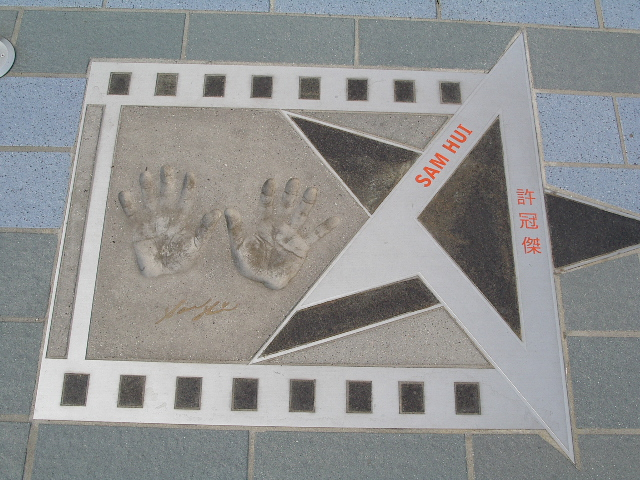
The handprint and autograph of Sam Hui at the Avenue of Stars, Hong Kong

Widely acclaimed as the "God of Song" in Hong Kong (the first singer to be so acknowledged), he decided to come out of retirement in 2004 and held multiple comeback concerts in which he was welcomed by a Hong Kong public at sell-out shows. In these concerts, he paid tribute to his recent passed close colleagues, Leslie Cheung and Anita Mui in 2003 and claimed that their deaths had influenced his decision to return to performing, culminating in his 2004 comeback song '04 Bless You ('04 祝福你). Hui performed in a concert in Kuala Lumpur on 19 and 20 February 2005 with his brother, Ricky Hui, and sons but has not made active plans for any follow-ups. He also performed in Vancouver on 15 December 2005 and in Singapore on 29 March 2008.

In 2007, Hui signed with EC Music and released his first album in 17 years, named "Life is Good" (人生多麼好).

== Personal life ==
In December 1971, Hui married Rebecca "Rebu" Fleming, a Filipino-American. They have two sons, Ryan Hui and Scott Hui. Hui and his family live in Hong Kong. Ryan Hui is a singer-songwriter and has released several albums, and Scott Hui is a film director.

== Discography ==
=== Cantonese albums ===
- 1974 Chinese: 鬼馬雙星
- 1975 The Last Message (Chinese: 天才與白痴)
- 1976 The Private Eyes Chinese: 半斤八兩
- 1978 Fortune God Comes (Chinese: 財神到)
- 1978 The Contract (Chinese: 賣身契)
- 1979 Chinese: 79夏日之歌集
- 1980 Chinese: 念奴嬌
- 1981 Security Unlimited (摩登保鑣)
- 1982 Chinese: 難忘您‧紙船
- 1983 Chinese: 最佳拍檔大顯神通
- 1983 Chinese: 新的開始
- 1984 Chinese: 最喜歡你
- 1985 Chinese: 最緊要好玩
- 1986 Chinese: 熱力之冠
- 1986 Chinese: 宇宙無限
- 1987 Band Chinese: 潮流興夾
- 1987 Chinese: 許冠傑新曲與精選
- 1988 Sam and Friends
- 1989 Chinese: 許冠傑 歌集
- 1990 Chinese: 香港情懷
- 1990 Chinese: 電影金曲精選
- 2004 Chinese: 歌神與您繼續微笑
- 2007 Chinese: 人生多麼好

=== English albums ===
- 1971 Time of the Season
- 1974 Morning After
- 1975 Interlude
- 1977 Came Travelling

== Filmography ==
=== Films ===
- 1973 Back Alley Princess (馬路小英雄)
- 1973 The Tattooed Dragon (龍虎金剛)
- 1974 Chinatown Capers (小英雄大鬧唐人街)
- 1974 Naughty! Naughty! (綽頭狀元) – Wu Te-chuan, a conman.
- 1974 Games Gamblers Play (鬼馬雙星)
- 1975 The Last Message (天才與白痴)
- 1976 The Private Eyes (半斤八兩)
- 1978 The Contract (賣身契)
- 1981 Security Unlimited (摩登保鑣)
- 1982 Aces Go Places (最佳拍檔)
- 1983 Aces Go Places 2 (最佳拍檔大顯神通)
- 1984 Aces Go Places 3 (最佳拍檔之女皇密令)
- 1984 A Family Affair (全家福)
- 1985 Working Class (打工皇帝)
- 1986 Aces Go Places IV (最佳拍檔千里救差婆)
- 1987 The Legend of Wisely (衛斯理傳奇) – as Producer.
- 1988 Chicken and Duck Talk (雞同鴨講) – Cameo
- 1989 Aces Go Places 5: The Terracotta Hit (新最佳拍檔)
- 1990 The Dragon from Russia (紅場飛龍)
- 1990 The Swordsman (笑傲江湖) – Ling Wu Chung
- 1990 Front Page (新半斤八兩)
- 1993 Laughter of the Water Margins (水滸笑傳)
- 1993 All's Well, Ends Well Too (花田囍事)
- 2000 Winner Takes All (大贏家)

== See also ==
- List of graduates of University of Hong Kong

Awards
Preceded by Lau Dong	Golden Needle Award of RTHK Top Ten Chinese Gold Songs Award; 1985	Succeeded by Tang Ti-sheng
