= Inspector Chocolate =

1986 Hong Kong film by Philip Chan

- Film poster
- Traditional Chinese: 神探朱古力
- Simplified Chinese: 神探朱古力
- Hanyu Pinyin: Shén Tàn Zhū Gǔ Lì
- Jyutping: San4 Taam3 Zyu1 Gu1 Lik1
- Directed by: Philip Chan
- Screenplay by: Michael Hui; Philip Chan
- Produced by: Michael Hui
- Starring: Michael Hui; Anita Mui; Ricky Hui; Sibelle Hu; Roy Chiao
- Cinematography: Poon Hang-sang; Ma Koon-wa
- Edited by: P.P.S. Adrian Brady
- Music by: Law Tik
- Production companies: Golden Harvest Productions; Hui's Film Production
- Distributed by: Golden Harvest
- Release date: 19 December 1986
- Running time: 106 minutes
- Country: Hong Kong
- Language: Cantonese
- Box office: HK$22,485,500

Inspector Chocolate is a 1986 Hong Kong crime comedy film co-written and directed by Philip Chan, and also co-written, produced by and starring Michael Hui. The film co-stars Anita Mui, Ricky Hui, Sibelle Hu and Roy Chiao.

== Overview ==
The film Inspector Chocolate is also known as Chocolate Inspector. The film's original title is Shen tan zhu gu li (Mr. Boo: Inspector Chocolate). The film's Chinese title is 神探朱古力. In Japan, the film is known as Mr. Boo 8: Inspector Chocolate.

== Plot ==
Although Chu Koo-lik (Chocolate) (Michael Hui) believes himself to have outstanding abilities, he has only reached the rank of Inspector despite working many years in the police force. Along with his cowardly assistant, Egg Tart (Ricky Hui), Chocolate is often occupied with nothing at the police station. One day, Chocolate's superior, Captain Wu (Roy Chiao), arranges his newcomer daughter, Kiu-kiu (Anita Mui) to work under Chocolate. However, Kiu-kiu and Chocolate dislike each other. Because Captain Wu deeply loves his daughter, he assigns simple cases to Chocolate, increasing Chocolate's dislike for Kiu-kiu.

Chocolate later receives a missing person case. Although he initially was uninterested, as the investigation goes on, the case suddenly took a dramatic turn, and full of mystery surrounds. Chocolate is determined to solve this case, with Kiu-kiu and Egg Tart under his wing.

== Cast ==
- Michael Hui as Inspector Chu Koo-lik (Chocolate)
- Anita Mui as Kiu-kiu
- Ricky Hui as Egg Tart
- Sibelle Hu as Mrs. Lam Mei-mei
- Roy Chiao as Captain K.W. Wu
- Agnes Cheung as Inspector Apple Man
- Michael Chan as Imposter of kidnapper
- Lo Chun-man as Mrs. Lam's elder son
- Lo Chun-kit as Mrs. Lam's missing son
- Sandra Lang as Ms. Aberdeen "crazy woman"
- Tai Po as Jesus
- Dennis Chan as TV producer
- Elvis Tsui as Child smuggler
- Mai Kei as Child smuggler driving 18wheel
- Fung Hak-on as Chen Long
- Michael Chow as Inspector Leung
- Tin Ching as Cafe manager
- Cheng Mang-ha as Toilet attendant
- Maria Cordero as Woman in toilet (cameo)
- Chow Mei-fung as Shopper at department shop
- Shrila Chun as Councillor Hui
- Felix Lok as Mr. Ho, Savory Cake Shop manager
- Annie Liu as Cooking show host
- Kam Kong-shing as Cooking show host
- Chui Fook-chuen
- Kwok Suk-king
- Yuet-ching Lee as Mrs. Lam's mother
- K.K. Wong as School principal
- Yat-poon Chai as Police sergeant at parade
- Eddie Chan as Policeman
- Fei Pak as Policeman
- Wong Chi-wing as Policeman
- Simon Cheung as Policeman
- Alric Ma as Policeman
- Lam Shung-ching as Policeman
- Sally Kwok
- Lam Chi-tai

== Reception ==
=== Critical ===
Andrew Saroch of Far East Films rated the film a score of 4 out of 5 stars, praising Philip Chan's director and the performances of the main cast, especially Michael Hui, noting how "it is always a joy to watch how Michael bumbles his way through while his face betrays little emotion." Hong Kong Digital gave the film a core of 7/10 and praises the film's script, its humor and Hui's comedic timing.

=== Box office ===
The film grossed HK$22,485,500 at the Hong Kong box office during its theatrical run from 19 December 1986 to 8 January 1987.

== Awards and nominations ==
Accolades
Ceremony	Category	Recipient	Outcome
6th Hong Kong Film Awards	Best Actor	Michael Hui	Nominated
6th Hong Kong Film Awards	Best Screenplay	Michael Hui, Philip Chan	Nominated
