= The Private Eyes (1976 film) =

1976 Hong Kong film by Michael Hui

- Film poster
- Traditional Chinese: 半斤八両
- Simplified Chinese: 半斤八两
- Literal meaning: six of one, half a dozen of the other
- Hanyu Pinyin: Bàn Jīn Bā Liǎng
- Jyutping: Bun3 Gan1 Baat3 Leong2
- Directed by: Michael Hui
- Written by: Michael Hui
- Produced by: Raymond Chow
- Starring: Michael Hui; Samuel Hui; Ricky Hui
- Cinematography: Cheung Yiu-cho
- Edited by: Peter Cheung
- Music by: Samuel Hui; The Lotus
- Production companies: Golden Harvest; Hui's Film Production
- Distributed by: Golden Harvest
- Release date: 16 December 1976
- Running time: 94 minutes
- Country: Hong Kong
- Language: Cantonese
- Box office: US$16.7 million (Asia)

The Private Eyes is a 1976 Hong Kong comedy film written, directed by and starring Michael Hui and co-starring his brothers Samuel Hui and Ricky Hui as well as Shih Kien and Richard Ng in his second film role. John Woo was the production designer and also co-director, though he was uncredited. Sammo Hung served as the film's action director and Jackie Chan was also a stuntman. This is the third film of the Hui Brothers and it is the first film that established the Hui Brothers' comedies internationally. It became the highest-grossing film in Hong Kong at the time.

== Plot ==
The film revolves around the exploits of a detective agency in Hong Kong called Mannix Private Detective Agency. It is headed by private detective Wong Yeuk-sze (Michael Hui) with his emotionally drained assistant Puffy (Ricky Hui). Meanwhile, Lee Kwok-kit (Samuel Hui), a kung fu expert, who works at a Vitasoy plant factory and spends most of the time doing kung fu tricks to impress a girl, ultimately loses his job. Seeking to find another line of work, Lee attempts to join Wong's detective agency. Despite Lee's impression with his kung fu talent which involves his snatching trick, Wong was not impressed. Then, as it appears that Lee would not get the job, Wong discovers that his wallet was missing and was presumed stolen by one bystander who bumped into them, which led to a scene where Wong fights the thief in the kitchen using sausage nunchaku as a weapon. Wong's onslaught backfires, and just as the thief walks away, Lee intercepts him and recovers the wallet, thus impressed Wong to hire him for the job. In truth, the wallet was in Wong's possession the whole time; they attacked an innocent bystander and stole his wallet.

The trio work together to serve their clients in many situations. For example, they were hired by a woman to capture photos of his husband's affair with another woman so she can get reward money at court. Later, they were also hired by a supermarket owner to foil an upcoming shoplifting case which leads to a scene where Lee puts his kung fu skills in use to fight thugs.

The most important part of the film is when a gang of robbers led by Uncle Nine (Shih Kien) who demands ransom from a cinema mogul. He then leads his gang to extort movie goers and Wong is one of them, who struggles against Uncle Nine in the mayhem, injuring his leg in the process. Lee, in the midst of the chaos, catches a few of the thugs and beats them up. Later, the gang leaves in an ice cream truck that one thug stole from the street, but Lee had defeated the thug earlier as he drives them to the police station. Along the way, Lee turns on the freezer which freezes the gang in the back. At the police station, Lee hands in the thugs to a police sergeant (Richard Ng), who appears throughout the film, both as a pursuer and as an investigation case to Wong and Lee. Lee later receives a good citizen award and leaves Wong's agency to start his own. Puffy also joins Lee.

Months later, an injured Wong returns to his agency with no assistant and no clients, who all went to Lee's agency known as Cannon Detective Service. Lee makes a deal with Wong to work together with Lee getting a higher share of profits. Wong refuses, and later learned a snatching trick from Lee, who was doing it in the beginning. Lee then offers a deal to work with Wong where they share half of the profits.

== Cast ==
| Cast | Role | Notes |
|---|---|---|
| Michael Hui | Wong Yeuk-sze, boss of the Mannix Private Detective Agency. | |
| Samuel Hui | Lee Kwok-kit, a ku-fu expert | |
| Ricky Hui | Puffy, Pighead | |
| Shih Kien | Gow-suk (aka Uncle Nine) | |
| Richard Ng | Police sergeant | |
| Chu Mu | Mr. Chu | |
| Angie Chiu | Jacky | |
| Mars | robber | |
| Tsang Choh-lam | bomb blackmailer of theater | |
| Huang Ha | shoplifter in supermarket | |
| Chan Yam | Substitute at the factory | |
| David Cheung | [cameo] at hotel | |
| Siu-Fong Lai | Mrs. Mok | |
| Chan Kim-wan | Thief of Wong's wallet | |
| Ko Hung | Biu | |
| Lily Leung | Mrs. Chu | |
| Chieh Yuan | Big Brother in gym | |
| Lo Wai-chi | Mrs. Chow | |
| Cheng Siu-ping | shoplifter in supermarket | |
| Ng Kit-keung | Hung | |
| Wong Chi-keung | drink in supermarket | |
| Wan Leng-kwong | policeman | |
| Siu Kam | Junior Brother in gym | |
| Chan Lap-ban | theatre robbery victim | |
| Yu Mo-lin | theatre robbery victim | |
| Gam Lau | eats dim sum | |
| Billy Chan | robber | |
| Stanley Hui | Hotel owner, manager of the Love Hotel | |
| San Sin | | |
| Cheung Sin-ming | King Kong | |
| Joe Junior | | |
| Melvin Wong | theatre robbery victim | |
| Jackie Chan | stuntman | |

== Box office ==
The film grossed HK$8,531,700 at the Hong Kong box office and became the highest-grossing film in Hong Kong. Its Hong Kong gross was equivalent to US$1.7 million. The film went on to gross US$5 million in Southeast Asia and US$10 million in Japan, for a total gross of US$16.7 million in Asia.

== Remake ==
The 1990 film, Front Page (新半斤八兩), reunites the trio of the Hui Brothers, which is also the last film the three appeared together. This time, the story revolves around the exploits of a tabloid magazine company. Like The Private Eyes, their exploits throughout the film resulted in investigation on celebrity scandals and their unfortunate situation involving the trio and a group of bank robbers.

== Album ==
The Private Eyes 半斤八兩

Studio album by Samuel Hui
- Released: 23 December 1976
- Genre: Cantopop
- Language: Cantonese
- Label: PolyGram

Samuel Hui chronology
| The Last Message 天才與白痴 (1975) | The Private Eyes 半斤八兩 (1976) | Fortune God Comes 財神到 (1978) |

The Private Eyes is Hong Kong singer and the film's costar Samuel Hui's third Cantopop album. The title song is the film's theme song with the same name, which was a hit, using especially colloquial street Cantonese in the lyrics which was a breakthrough at that time. The use of street Cantonese was justified as the film, which depicted the working class, struck a chord with Hong Kong people after its release.

=== Track listing ===
1. "半斤八兩"
2. "浪子心聲"
3. "打雀英雄傳"
4. "梨渦淺笑"
5. "大家跟住唱"
6. "有酒今朝醉"
7. "知音夢裡尋"
8. "鬼馬大家樂"
9. "夜半輕私語"
10. "斷腸夢"
11. "追求三部曲"
12. "流水恨"
