= Chicken and Duck Talk =

1988 Hong Kong film by Clifton Ko

- Film poster
- Traditional Chinese: 雞同鴨講
- Simplified Chinese: 鸡同鸭讲
- Directed by: Clifton Ko
- Screenplay by: Michael Hui; Clifton Ko
- Story by: Joe Ma; James Yuen
- Produced by: Ronny Yu; Michael Hui (executive)
- Starring: Michael Hui; Ricky Hui; Sylvia Chang; Lowell Lo; Lawrence Ng
- Cinematography: Derek Wan
- Edited by: Wong Yee Shun
- Music by: Richard Yuen
- Distributed by: Hui's Film Production Co.
- Release date: 14 July 1988
- Running time: 99 minutes
- Country: Hong Kong
- Language: Cantonese

Chicken and Duck Talk (Chinese: 雞同鴨講; Jyutping: gai1 tung4 aap3 gong2; lit. 'Chicken with Duck Talk') is a 1988 comedy film starring and co-written by Michael Hui. It is directed and co-written by Clifton Ko. The film deals with the conflict that ensues between the proprietor of an old-fashioned roast duck restaurant that is in trouble for health violations and the new fast food chicken restaurant that opens across the street. The film was the highest-grossing Hong Kong film released in 1988. Hui's screenplay and performance won him several awards, including a special award given by the American Film Institute in 1989.

The film also includes a celebrity cameo by Sam Hui (Michael's younger brother), as the master of ceremonies at the grand opening of Danny's Chicken, and the screen debut of Gloria Yip in a brief appearance as Hui's son's school friend. Sam Hui (as himself) speaks the title phrase, an idiom for people not understanding each other, to cut his speech short.

== Plot ==
A man named Hui is the struggling proprietor of a Cantonese BBQ roast duck restaurant in Hong Kong. At the beginning of the film, Hui is visited by a health inspector, who finds a cockroach in his soup and other unsanitary conditions, and threatens to sue the restaurant. However, Hui's staff stop the inspector from leaving with evidence, allowing Hui to continue running the restaurant. While the restaurant is operated on ground floor, Hui lives upstairs with his wife and son. He receives a visit from his rich mother-in-law, who is convinced that her daughter, Ah Kuen, has married a good-for-nothing man.

Hui faces competition when a profit-oriented businessman, Danny Poon, opens what is to be the first of a fast food chain of fried chicken restaurants across the street from him. Danny's Chicken employs a wide range of marketing techniques that makes them instantly popular, causing Hui's business to plummet. Jealous of the employees at the rival chicken restaurant and fed up with their poor pay and working conditions, Hui's staff voice their dissatisfaction and one of the employees, Cuttlefish, leaves to work at Danny's Chicken. However, he discovers while being trained at Danny's Chicken that Poon's regimen is strict and humiliating. He is made to hand out leaflets outside the shop dressed as a chicken, much to Hui's disgust.

In response to Hui's dwindling business, his nagging mother-in-law offers to pay for a renovation, but Hui is at first too proud to accept. He finds out that his son visited Danny's Chicken with his girlfriend Judy, and decides to infiltrate the rival business dressed as an Indian woman, but is quickly exposed by Poon. Hui tries to turn his luck around by adopting Poon's marketing techniques and "packaging" in order to appeal to the fashionable crowd, redecorating and holding a disastrous karaoke night. He also begins to parade the street in a makeshift duck costume, leading to a physical altercation with Cuttlefish in his chicken suit that nearly gets them both arrested. His attempts only succeed in alienating his loyal customers, including a Buddhist nun whose regular order is vegetarian noodles with no lard.

Poon plots a final sabotage against Hui by releasing rats into the restaurant during a health inspection. Cuttlefish returns to the duck restaurant after he was fired for talking back to a customer, disillusioned with Poon's techniques to the point he even tried to foil the sabotage, and Hui refuses Poon's attempt to buy out the business that he has run for years. Hui overcomes his pride and accepts his mother-in-law's help to renovate the restaurant before she leaves for China. The renovation is a success, so much so that Danny's Chicken begins selling roast duck in imitation, but it is not as good as Hui's secret recipe. Angered that his fast food chain has been defeated, Poon resorts to an arson attempt that goes wrong and ends up setting Danny's Chicken on fire before he is rescued by Hui.

== Reception ==
A retrospective review in 2005 rated the film as "justly famous... well-made, it was a fresh look at ordinary urban Hong Kongers, and it's funny."

The 1991 film 雞鴨戀 (Gāi áap lyún, known in English as Gigolo and Whore) translates as Chicken and Duck Love.

== Cast ==
- Michael Hui as Hui
- Sylvia Chang as Ah Kuen
- Ricky Hui as Cuttlefish
- Lowell Lo as Chimp
- Lawrence Ng as Danny Poon
- Ku Feng as Raymond
- Yan Pak as Mother-in-law, Tammy's mother
- Ng Leung as Hui's son
- Sam Hui as himself
- Gloria Yip as Judy
