= Philip Chan (actor) =

Hong Kong actor and filmmaker

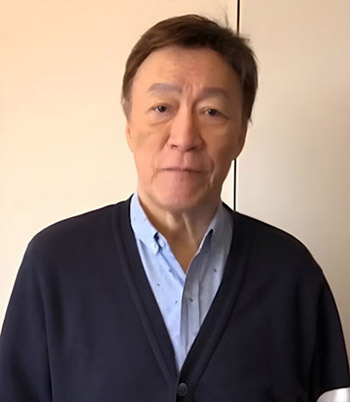
- Chan in 2021
- Born: 25 January 1945 (age 81); British Hong Kong
- Occupations: Actor, film director, screenwriter, producer, police officer
- Employer: Royal Hong Kong Police Force (1965-1976)

Chinese name
- Traditional Chinese: 陳欣健
- Simplified Chinese: 陈欣健
Transcriptions
Standard Mandarin
- Hanyu Pinyin: Chén Xīnjiàn
Yue: Cantonese
- Jyutping: Can^{4} Jan^{1}gin^{6}

Philip Chan Yan-kin (Chinese: 陳欣健; born 25 January 1945) is a Hong Kong actor, filmmaker, music composer, and former police officer.

== Early years ==
Chan was born in British Hong Kong in 1945, the son of Cantonese parents from Taishan. He was educated at La Salle College, where he was the lead vocalist for the first all-Chinese college pop group, "The Astro-Notes" (named for the astronauts of the 1960s).

=== Law enforcement work ===
From 1965 to 1976, Chan was an officer in the Royal Hong Kong Police Force, reaching the rank of Superintendent.

He displayed courage and leadership in solving several major crime cases in the British Colony, including the first-ever armed bank robbery in 1974 in which 11 hostages were held at ransom. He was nicknamed the "Singing Inspector" when he wrote the lyrics and went on TV to promote road safety for school children.

His most memorable moment as a police inspector was during a press conference with members of Hong Kong's press at the scene of the 1974 Po Sang Bank robbery, one of the biggest bank robbery cases up until then in the city's history.

== Career ==
After retiring from the Police Force in 1976, Chan joined Bang Bang Films as a Producer. He simultaneously headed its Advertising Department, marketing the then very popular jeans and apparel brand name in Hong Kong.

That same year, he was invited by actress Josephine Siu (Siu Fong Fong) and director Pochi Leung to write a police screenplay involving heroin trafficking between Amsterdam and Hong Kong, "Jumping Ash". The upbeat detective movie was an instant box-office success in 1976, grossing one million dollars in three days and causing the young policeman to consider pursuing his greatest love of life, films, and music. He resigned from public service to head the film production and marketing department for Bang Bang Group, the most successful jeans company in Hong Kong. He also took the helm in producing two popular youth programs on Hong Kong Television Broadcasting Limited and the then Rediffusion Television, respectively, to promote Bang Bang Fashion. He became a renowned actor, scriptwriter, director, and producer, with 14 films under his direction from 1976 to 1990. He is the Honorable Lifetime Chairman of the Hong Kong Film Director's Guild and an Honorable Committee Member of the Hong Kong Performing Artists Guild. He was also one of the principal emcees in Hong Kong's leading television station, Hong Kong Television Broadcasting Limited (TVB) for over 15 years.

Intending to strengthen his skills in Management and Marketing, he spent less time in acting and producing and eventually became an executive working for several commercial conglomerates in Hong Kong:

1. 1980s general manager, Capital Artist Company (華星娛樂唱片公司) – creating numerous hits and propelling a string of singers into superstardom, including Aaron Kwok (郭富城), Sammi Cheng (鄭秀文), Andy Hui (許志安), Edmond Leung (梁漢文) and Coco Lee (李玟).
2. 1990s managing director, Metro Broadcasts Limited (香港新城電臺) – Hong Kong's youngest radio station, owned by business tycoon Li Ka Shing, was running at a loss for five consecutive years since it opened. During this time, he produced numerous stage award shows and events that gave Metro Broadcast success and increase in revenue.
3. Late 1990s until early 2000, chief operating officer, Star East Group (東方魅力集團) – a stars/celebrities owned company engaged in the running of themed restaurants (including the then very successful Planet Hollywood). Philip was involved in opening the Star East Entertainment complexes in Hong Kong and Guangzhou and was the driver of the franchised project in Chengdu. The Group has been sold to another listed company in 2002.
4. Since 2000 Proprietor and chief operating officer, Endless Idea Management Limited – A promoter of concerts and event marketing in Hong Kong. Apart from supplying Hong Kong stars' performances and concerts to mainland China, Singapore, Malaysia, and Atlantic City, he also produced the very popular Winter Wonderland in Tsuen Wan for Sino Properties. The same show was, by demand, produced in Donguan, China.
5. 2003–2005 He was the chief executive officer of Mandarin Films (東方電影).
6. 2005–2007 chief operating officer, Emperor Motion Pictures (英皇電影). Once again, he became a front-line filmmaker with the opening up of the China market. He simultaneously headed the Emperor Films/Shanghai Film Group joint-venture, the SFG Emperor Film Company (上映英皇电影有限公司)in Shanghai. During this period, he produced two films, "Home Run" (回家的路)and the comedy "The Fantastic Water babes" (出水芙蓉).

Since 1999, he started his penetration into the entertainment market of mainland China in the fields of television production (the starting up of the Lucky Paid TV Channel in Shanghai), film production (for Emperor Films in the movie "Home Run" and its subsequent distribution. He acted as a consultant for the Canadian independent horror film "Walking the Dead," which was shot on location in Heibei, Northern China, in 2009.

For 32 years, he has been one of Hong Kong's masters of ceremony and show host. His style is heavily influenced by his congenial style, personality, energy, and humour. His TV appearances include "The Return Of Hong Kong's Sovereignty to China"; the annual main Hong Kong beauty pageant "The Miss Hong Kong Pageant"; and the "Eastern China Flood Relief Charity Gala" at the People's Hall in Beijing to "Miss Playboy International".

He is the chairman and chief executive officer of Endless Idea Management (Hong Kong) Limited and Fantasia Entertainment Production Group (Macao) Company Limited. These companies engage in event planning and production for major Casinos and Hotels in Macao and mainland China. He has also formed a new film company, Good Earth Films, to consult and produce for overseas and Chinese film companies in mainland China, Hong Kong and Taiwan.

The two companies engage in the work of artists agent, variety event production, event management and film production consultancy. He is also the CEO of Grand Olympia Films (Hong Kong) Limited. He heads developing several films to be jointly produced by mainland China and Hong Kong film companies. One of these films, The Tiger and I, is under pre-production and is due for principal photography in October 2014.

== Filmography ==
=== Actor ===
- Jumping Ash (1976)
- The Extra (1977)
- Foxbat (1977) – Lee
- Between the Twins (1978, TV Series)
- The Servant (1979) – Inspector Pang
- Shou kou (1979)
- Dian zhi bing bing (1979)
- Di er dao cai hong (1979) – Tsai Yung Tsung
- Encore (1980) – The Uncle
- Avengers from Hell (1981)
- A Can dang chai (1981)
- Long gan wei (1981)
- Chuang ban shen tan dian zi gui (1981)
- Hunting Head (1982) – Kim Tai-Yung
- Secret Ninja, Roaring Tiger (1982)
- Noigwon (1983)
- Gun Is Law (1983) – Chan Shing-Fung
- Winners and Sinners (1983) – Inspector
- The Return of the Condor Heroes (1983, TV Series) – Luk Jin-yuan
- Esprit d'amour (1983) – John Tang
- Red Panther (1983) – Lai's Superior
- Pom Pom (1984) – Inspector Chan
- The Return of Pom Pom (1984) – Inspector Chan
- San wen zhi (1984)
- The Owl vs Bombo (1984) – Cop
- Mr. Boo Meets Pom Pom (1985) – Inspector Chan
- Two Jolly Cops (1985)
- Twinkle, Twinkle, Lucky Stars (1985) – Person at the end #2
- Street Fighters Part II (1985)
- Night Caller (1985) – Steve Chan
- Duo bao ji shang ji (1986)
- Pom Pom Strikes Back (1986) – Inspector Chan
- The Romancing Star (1987) – Kenny
- Flaming Brothers (1987) – Chen
- Xiang Gang xiao jie xie zhen (1987) – Prosecutor Chan
- Crazy Spirit (1987) – Inspector Chen
- Ching yi sam (1988) – Chick
- Bloodsport (1988) – Captain Chen
- Hero of Tomorrow (1988) – Crow's Target
- City Warriors (1988) – Supt. Chan
- Jing cha ye yi min (1989)
- Xiao xiao xiao jing cha (1989)
- Carry On Yakuzas!! (1989) – Willie
- Eat a Bowl of Tea (1989) – Henry Wang
- Hoi sam gui miu ba (1989)
- The Immigrant Policeman (1989)
- Fatal Bet (1989)
- Widow Warriors (1990) – Liu Chuan-Hau
- Spy Games (1990) – Ken's Boss
- The Musical Vampire (1990)
- Pantyhose Hero (1990) – Officer Raiding Gay Bar
- The Tigers (1991) – Supt. Tsao Siu-Ping
- Double Impact (1991) – Raymond Zhang
- The Banquet (1991) – Policeman
- Sisters of the World Unite (1991)
- Twin Dragons (1992) – Hotel Manager Chen
- The Magic Touch (1992) – Commissioner David Ho
- Ngoh oi nau man choi (1992)
- Heart Against Hearts (1992) – Phillip
- Hard Boiled (1992) – Supt. Pang
- Police Story 3 (1992) – Insp. Y.K. Chen
- Fight Back to School III (1993) – Officer Chan
- Love on Delivery (1994) – Television Commercial Pitchman
- Nine Girls and a Ghost (2002)
- Good Times, Bed Times (2003)
- Home Run (2008)
- The Fantastic Water Babes (2008)
- Winner Takes It All (2012, Short)
- I Love The Way You Love Me (2013) – Host
- Inflection (2014)
- Tale of Three Cities (2015) – KMT Agent Chief (Shanghai)
- OCTB (2017, TV Series)
- Always (2015) – Gang Li
- The Big Call (2017) – Head of Hong Kong Police (final film role)

=== Director ===
- 1979: The Servants 牆內牆外
- 1981: Charlie's Bubbles 文仔的肥皂泡
- 1984: The Return of Pom Pom 雙龍出海
- 1985: Night Caller 平安夜
- 1986: Chocolate Inspector 神探朱古力
- 1986: Tongs, a Chinatown Story 堂口故事
- 1986: Where's Officer Tuba? 霹靂大喇叭
- 1986: From Here to Prosperity 奪寶計上計
- 1989: Carry On Yakuza 黑道福星
- 1989: Mr Sunshine 開心巨無霸
- 1990: Front Page 新半斤八兩

=== Producer or Production Adviser ===
- 1977: Foxbat 狐蝠
- 1978: The Extras 茄哩啡
- 1979: Cops and Robbers 點指兵兵
- 1980: Encore 喝采
- 1985: Mr Boo Meets Pom Pom 智勇三寶
- 1989: Path of Glory 沖天小子
- 2002: Nine Girls and a Ghost 九個女仔一隻鬼
- 2003: Cross Marriages in China 外地媳婦本地郎
- 2006: Hone Run 回家的路
- 2006: The Fantastic Water Babes 出水芙蓉
- 2011: 33 Postcards 幸福卡片
- 2014: The Tiger and I (in pre-production)

=== Scriptwriter ===
- 1975: Jumping Ash 跳灰
- 1977: Foxbat 狐蝠
- 1978: The Extras 茄哩啡
- 1979: Cops and Robers 點指兵兵
- 1981: Charlie's Bubbles 文仔的肥皂泡
- 1981: Krazy Kops 撞板神探電子龜
- 1984: Long Arm of the Law 省港旗兵
- 1986: Long Arm of the Law II 省港旗兵 II
- 1985: Night Caller 平安夜
- 1986: Chocolate Inspector 神探朱古力
- 1988: Edge of Darkness 陷阱邊沿
- 1989: Carry On Yakuzas 黑道福星
- 1989: Mr Sunshine 開心巨無霸
- 1989: Path of Glory 沖天小子
- 1990: Front Page 新半斤八兩
- 2014: The Tiger and I (in pre-production)
