= All's Well, Ends Well Too =

1993 Hong Kong film by Clifton Ko

- Film poster
- Directed by: Clifton Ko
- Written by: Clifton Ko; Vincent Kok; Raymond Wong; Joe Ma
- Produced by: Raymond Wong; Ronny Yu
- Starring: Samuel Hui; Leslie Cheung; Rosamund Kwan; Teresa Mo; Sandra Ng; Ricky Hui; Ng Man-tat
- Cinematography: Sander Lee
- Edited by: Wong Yee-shun; David Wu; Kam Ma
- Music by: Mark Lui; James Wong
- Distributed by: Mandarin Films Ltd.
- Release date: 20 January 1993
- Running time: 85 minutes
- Country: Hong Kong
- Language: Cantonese
- Box office: HK$35,481,480

All's Well, Ends Well Too (花田喜事) is a 1993 Hong Kong comedy film directed by Clifton Ko, and released as comedy fare as is the usual custom to entertain movie-goers on the Lunar New Year celebrations. The main setting is in the Song Dynasty and this reflects in the period costumes and architecture.

All's Well, Ends Well Too is part of a series of similarly titled films, together with All's Well, Ends Well (1992), of which it is not a sequel, All's Well, Ends Well 1997 (1997), All's Well, Ends Well 2009 (2009), and the similarly themed All's Well, Ends Well 2010 (2010).

== Synopsis ==
This comedy follows in tune with the series of films of the same name. Chow Tung (Samuel Hui) is a licentious man who was arranged to get married along with his ugly sister Gut (Sandra Ng) to partners not of their choice. Chow, being a filial son, agrees to go along with his mother's (Ricky Hui) plans. The plot thickens when Chow meets the beautiful Snow White (Rosamund Kwan) and decides to marry her of which Matriarch Chow agrees whole-heartedly. Unknown to them, Snow White's magician lover, David Cooper Feel (Leslie Cheung) schemes a plan and Chow Tung was married instead to Jinx (Teresa Mo).

The entire film uses mistaken identity as its central theme for comic effect, this theme is repeated for All's Well, Ends Well Too 2010.

== Cast ==
- Samuel Hui as Chow Tung
- Leslie Cheung as David Copper Feel (a parody of magician David Copperfield)
- Rosamund Kwan as Snow White
- Teresa Mo as Jinx
- Sandra Ng as Gut
- Raymond Wong as Lam Ka-sing
- Ricky Hui as Matriarch Chow
- Ng Man-tat as Snow White's father
- Money Lo as Snow White's Servant
- James Wong as Magistrate
- Clifton Ko as Pimp
- Vincent Kok as Bo

== Theme song ==
- Happy Events Arriving Together (喜事齊來)
  - Composer: Samuel Hui
  - Lyricist: Raymond Wong
  - Singer: Ricky Hui
