= The Contract (1978 film) =

1978 Hong Kong film by Michael Hui

- Film poster
- Traditional Chinese: 賣身契
- Simplified Chinese: 卖身契
- Hanyu Pinyin: Mài shēn qì
- Jyutping: maai6 san1 kai3
- Directed by: Michael Hui
- Screenplay by: Michael Hui; So Chi-hung
- Produced by: Raymond Chow
- Starring: Michael Hui; Samuel Hui; Ricky Hui
- Cinematography: Tom Lau
- Edited by: Peter Cheung
- Music by: Samuel Hui
- Production company: Golden Harvest
- Distributed by: Golden Harvest
- Release date: 3 August 1978
- Running time: 96 minutes
- Country: Hong Kong
- Language: Cantonese
- Box office: HK$7,823,019

The Contract (Chinese: 賣身契) is a 1978 Hong Kong comedy film written, directed by and starring Michael Hui. The film also co-stars Hui's brothers, Samuel Hui and Ricky Hui. It was very successful at the Hong Kong box office being the highest-grossing film there at the time.

== Plot ==
Sit Chi-man works as a television presenter in MTV, but he is usually gets neglected by employees, including his new manager, Miss Wang. Frustrated by his eight-year contract with the company, he and his brother, Sit Chi-ying, sneak into MTV headuarters to steal his contract. However, Miss Wang's parrot alerts the assistants and Sit Chi-ying hides inside the safe box. Once the assistants leave, Sit Chi-man tries to open the safe box but is caught by King Kong, Miss Wang's henchman. After narrowly escape, Sit Chi-man seeks help from Chiu Sai-kit, a magician and his sister, Chiu Ling-ling, who is Sit Chi-ying's crush, to save Sit Chi-ying.

Once they arrived at MTV headquarters, Miss Wang helds Sit Chi-ying hostage and threatens Sit Chi-man to return the contract. Sit Chi-man and Chiu Sai-kit manage to defeat the henchmen and Miss Wang is forced to jump off the roof after her revenue plummets.

Sit Chi-man and Chiu Sai-kit are appointed as the new managers of MTV after Chiu Sai-kit's abusive manager is taken away by the two reformed henchmen.

== Cast ==
- Michael Hui as Sit Chi-man
- Samuel Hui as Chiu Sai-kit
- Ricky Hui as Sit Chi-ying
- Tiffany Bao as Ms. Wang
- Ellen Lau as Chu Ling-ling
- Yeung Wai as Ms. Wang's eye-path assistant
- Cheng Fu-hing as King Kong (voiced by Tang Wing Hung)
- Russell Cawthorne as Guru
- Chan King-cheung as MTV chairman
- Cheng Siu-ping as Mrs. Li
- Kwong Kwan-ning as Mr. Kwong
- Lee Pang-fei as Cat TV manager
- Chiu Chun as MTV board of director
- Fong Yue as Woman coming out of elevator
- Huang Pa-ching as Mrs. Li
- Man Sau as Man's mother
- Pan Yung-sheng as Audience for alien show
- Kwan Yan as Audience at magic show
- Cheung Sek-Au as Audience at magic show
- Johnny Koo as one of three bank robbers
- Kam Tin-chue as MTV board of director
- Si Lau-wa
- Lau Cheun
- Hoh Wan

== Reception ==
The Contract was a commercial success, earning HK$7,820,019 at the box office

In The Hong Kong Filmography, 1977-1997, John Charles described The Contract as "totally disarming and one of The Hui's Brothers most consistently amusing efforts" while Stephen Teo in his book Hong Kong Cinema: the Extra Dimensions wrote "Michael Hui ended the decade with arguably his best film".

The film was nominated for three Golden Horse Awards in 1978, and was Michael Hui's first and last nomination for a Golden Horse Award, until his nomination for Best Actor for his work in the 2016 film Godspeed at the 53rd Golden Horse Awards.

== Accolades ==
Award	Date	Category	Recipient(s) and nominee(s)	Result	Ref(s)
15th Golden Horse Awards	1978	Best Film Editing	Peter Cheung	Won	
15th Golden Horse Awards	1978	Best Director	Michael Hui	Nominated	
15th Golden Horse Awards	1978	Best Feature Film	Golden Harvest (HK) Limited	Nominated	

== Album ==
The Contract 賣身契

Studio album by Sam Hui
- Released: July 1978
- Genre: Cantopop
- Language: Cantonese
- Label: PolyGram

Sam Hui chronology
The God of Wealth Has Arrived 財神到 (1978)	The Contract 賣身契 (1978)	79 Summer Song Collection; 79夏日之歌集 (1979)

The Contract is Sam Hui's fifth Cantopop album with the title track being the film's theme song. In Asia soundtrack has shifted 500,000 units.

=== Track listing ===
1. "賣身契"
2. "舞伴"
3. "男兒漢"
4. "世事如棋"
5. "應該要自愛"
6. "人生的道路"
7. "學生哥"
8. "杯酒當歌"
9. "拜拜"
10. "相思萬千重"
11. "飲勝"
12. "父母恩"
13. "太空舞"（音樂）
