= In-Laws, Out-Laws =

2004 Chinese-Hong Kong film by Clifton Ko

- 我的大嚿父母
- Directed by: Clifton Ko
- Written by: Wang Dandan, Wang Ping, Wu Wenhui and Xu Danhua
- Starring: Eric Tsang, Lydia Shum, Shawn Yue, Coco Chiang, Danny Su, Guo Chang, Eva Fu, Peng Xinzhi
- Cinematography: Huang Baomin, Mai Haiwen
- Edited by: Xu Weijie
- Music by: Wen Haojie
- Distributed by: Guangzhou Yingyang Communication Business Co., Ltd. City TV
- Release date: January 8, 2004
- Running time: 100 minutes
- Countries: China; Hong Kong
- Language: Cantonese

In-Laws, Out-Laws
- Simplified Chinese: 我的大嚿父母
Transcriptions
Standard Mandarin
- Hanyu Pinyin: Wo De Da Huo Fu Mu

In-Laws, Out-Laws (Chinese: 我的大嚿父母) is a 2004 Lunar New Year film directed by Clifton Ko, and it is also the first Lunar New Year film in the south. Because the film is adapted from the Cantonese TV series "Kang's Family", the filming and themes are mainly based on Guangdong. Co-produced by China and Hong Kong, the Chinese name does not allow the use of dialects, so it is only called the film version of "Kang's Family".

== Shooting background ==
As early as January 2002, because the TV series "Kang's Family" was broadcast in Guangdong, the highest peak was 41.39 points Audience measurement, Guangdong Radio and Television intended to make the drama into movie in order to give the audience a TV short drama. Feeling. Guangdong TV also commissioned the Guangzhou Municipal Bureau of Statistics to do market research, and found that only Guangzhou, more than 40% of the people expressed their expectations for the film.，30% of the people will come to watch it with their families after the movie version of "The Foreign Daughter-in-law" is, Guangdong TV, Yingyang Communication Co., Ltd. and City TV reached an agreement on February 28, 2003, to start filming.，Officially signed on April 25 of the same year and released it during the Spring Festival in 2004. At that time, the director of Oriental Film Huang Baiming, who signed the contract on behalf of Oriental Film, said at the signing ceremony, "I believe that with my 20-year experience in making Hong Kong New Year's films and the hot ratings of the TV series "Foreign Daughter-in-law Local Lang", the movie version of 'Foreign Daughter- He laughed and said, "It will be more wonderful to do than TV series." He also said, "Successful in the south is more satisfying than Hong Kong (successful in Hong Kong)."。The producer used this film to break the situation of Feng Xiaogang's New Year's movie monopoly, and occupied a place for the Southern New Year's movie. According to the report of Guangdong TV，The original plan was for Huang Baiming to play the role of "Kangbo" in the film, while Azu's girlfriend was starred by South Korea star, and even joined by Blackie Ko.

It turned on in Guangzhou on September 13, 2003. The movie's Xiguan House is taken from No.2, Yunxianfang, Huagui Xiheng Street, Guangzhou, capital of Guangdong.

== Synopsis ==
Kang's ancestral home in Xiguan, Guangzhou is suspected to have found ancient cultural relics, and the Kang family is overjoyed. Mrs. Kang (played by Shen Dianxia) announced that she would divide the found property into four parts. She and her three sons, A Guang (played by Su Zhidan), A Zong (played by Guo Chang) and A Yao (played by Peng Xinzhi), but the part that has not yet been familyed or divorced is temporarily kept by her. Kang Bo (played by Zeng Zhiwei), who took his young son Azu (played by Yu Wenle) to Hong Kong to search for gold in Hong Kong twenty years ago, read the news and also returned to Guangzhou to get a piece of the pie. In order to realize the "dream of making a fortune", a series of funny things happened.

== Box office ==
The film was released in Hong Kong in January 2004. It has been released for less than two weeks and grossed 250,000 yuan at the box office.
