= Security Unlimited =

1981 Hong Kong film by Michael Hui

- Film poster
- Traditional Chinese: 摩登保鑣
- Simplified Chinese: 摩登保镖
- Hanyu Pinyin: Módēng Bǎobiāo
- Jyutping: Mo1 dang1 bou2 biu1
- Directed by: Michael Hui
- Written by: Michael Hui; Samuel Hui
- Produced by: Raymond Chow
- Starring: Samuel Hui; Michael Hui; Ricky Hui; Marylinn Wong; Stanley Fung; Chan Sing
- Cinematography: Cheung Yiu-cho; Tom Lau
- Edited by: Peter Cheung
- Music by: Samuel Hui
- Production companies: Golden Harvest; Hui Brothers Films
- Distributed by: Golden Harvest
- Release date: 30 January 1981
- Running time: 92 minutes
- Country: Hong Kong
- Language: Cantonese
- Box office: HK$18 million

Security Unlimited (Chinese: 摩登保鑣) is a 1981 Hong Kong comedy film directed by and starring Michael Hui and co-starring his brothers Samuel Hui and Ricky Hui, who are known as the Hui Brothers. Michael Hui was awarded Best Actor at the 1st Hong Kong Film Awards, making him the first ever recipient for the award.

== Plot ==
Chow Sai-cheung (Michael Hui), a bitter supervisor of a Hong Kong private security company, teaches unusual guard tactics to new recruits such as electric mats, parachuting off burning buildings and counter-attacking gunfire. He was secretly observed by his new boss (Stanley Fung) and Sylvester (Arnis Hasi), unimpressed by his work, the new boss demotes Chow and promotes Chow's assistant Sam (Samuel Hui). Under the leadership of Sam, Chow and new recruit Bruce Tang (Ricky Hui) encounter a slew of misadventures, including pursuing stowaways on a party boat. Bruce ultimately falls in love with one of the stowaways. Finally, they all get entangled in a plot to steal one of China's most prized treasures on display in Hong Kong, and in a plot involving some missing government money that the security officers were guarding.

== Cast ==
Cast	Role
Samuel Hui	Lieutenant Sam
Michael Hui	Chow Sai-cheung
Ricky Hui	Bruce Tang Siu-lung
Marylinn Wong	Chun
Stanley Fung	Fan
Arnis Hasi	Sylvester
Chan Sing	Robber gang thief
Hoi Sang Lee	Robber with pump-gun
David Cheung	Robber with harpoon
Yue Tau-wan	Crossed-eye robber
Kobe Wong	Robber knowing melody
Hui Sai-cheung	Wong Security boss
Ray Cordeiro	Horse race trickster
Joe Junior	Sniper with ice bullets
Tsang Choh-lam	Fake corpse
Lau Hak-suen	Taipan Law
Wong Man	Taipan Law's wife
Roks	Ship party moderator
Wong Chik-sam	Sergeant
Danny Au	Thief in factory
Fung Fung	Driving examiner
Tang Mei-mei	
Bill Tung	Race course commentator
Hung Leung-sek	Race course commentator
Tong Si	Robbed bak employee
Albert Cheung	Kidney thief
Maria Chung	Ship party guest
Fung Shui-chun	
Tse Hon-san	
Man Nga-tik	
Sek Ngai-wan	
Leung Shu-wing	
Ng Man-lei	

== Box office ==
The film was the biggest grossing of the Hui Brothers comedies and became the biggest grossing film of all-time in Hong Kong with HK$18 million. It also became the highest-grossing film of all-time in Singapore with a gross of S$1.4 million.

== Accolades ==
Accolades
Ceremony	Category	Recipient	Outcome
1st Hong Kong Film Awards	Best Actor	Michael Hui	Won

== Album ==
Security Unlimited 摩登保鑣

Studio album by Samuel Hui
- Released: March 1981
- Genre: Cantopop
- Language: Cantonese
- Label: PolyGram

Samuel Hui chronology
Nim Fei Giu 念奴嬌 (1980)	Security Unlimited 摩登保鑣 (1981)	Cannot Forget You‧Paper Boat 難忘您‧紙船 (1982)

Security Unlimited is Samuel Hui's eighth Cantopop album with the title track being the film's theme song.

=== Track listing ===
1. "摩登保鑣"
2. "印象"
3. "扮野"
4. "笑下就算"
5. "長春不老"
6. "我的心仍屬於您"
7. "恭喜！恭喜！"
8. "人辦"
9. "陽光"
10. "甜蜜的往事"
11. "歌曲解困憂"
12. "我問"
