= The Magic Touch (film) =

1992 Hong Kong film by Michael Hui

- Film poster
- Traditional Chinese: 神算
- Simplified Chinese: 神算
- Hanyu Pinyin: Shén Suàn
- Jyutping: San4 Syun3
- Directed by: Michael Hui
- Screenplay by: Michael Hui; Dayo Wong
- Story by: Michael Hui
- Produced by: Michael Hui
- Starring: Michael Hui; Leon Lai; Ricky Hui; Winnie Lau; Sunny Fang
- Cinematography: Herman Yau
- Edited by: Teddy Chan
- Music by: Tats Lau
- Production companies: Hui's Film Production; Topping Time Films
- Distributed by: Newport Entertainment
- Release date: 24 January 1992
- Country: Hong Kong
- Language: Cantonese
- Box office: HK$36,399,307

The Magic Touch (Chinese: 神算) is a 1992 Hong Kong comedy film written, produced and directed by Michael Hui, and stars Hui himself alongside Leon Lai.

== Plot ==
Hui Wai-kuk (Michael Hui) tells people's fortunes by feeling their bones. In reality, he is a scammer who is able to read minds of others because he has gathered information about them in advance; he is able to make a lot of money. The wife of Commissioner David Ho (Philip Chan) of the Inland Revenue Department (IRD) is suspicious that her husband is cheating on her. Hui tells Mrs. Ho the name of the mistress. She then scolds Ho in his office.

Ho sends junior assessor Yau Ho-kei (Leon Lai) to investigate Hui's income. Yau does not work seriously, but he wants to stand out. During the investigation, Hui sustains a brain injury causing his coma. After he wakes up, he discovers that he has gained superpowers, being able to feel people's bones and see their future.

At this time, the IRD is investigating businessman Hung Sam (Sunny Fang) for tax evasion, but the case is progressing slowly. Yau arranges for Hui to get close to Hui for a chance "touch" to find out where Hung's accounting book is hidden.

At first, Hung thought Hui and Yau were gay and avoided them at all costs. But after discovering that Hui is a fortune teller, he hires the two, greatly trusts them, and reveals to them his drug business. Yau then reports information about Hung's drug business to Commissioner Ho. The case is cracked, Yau is then promoted to investigation superintendent and Hui, having assisted in the case, does not have to pay the tax that he owed for many years.

== Cast ==
- Michael Hui as Hui Wai-kuk
- Leon Lai as Yau Ho-kei
- Ricky Hui as Fat
- Winnie Lau as Yeuk-lan
- Sunny Fang as Hung Sam
- Chan Hiu-ying as May
- Dayo Wong as William
- Michael Dinga as Senior Tax Inspector Lam
- Philip Chan as David Ho
- Carrie Ng as Inspector Fong Fong-fong
- Yonfan as Man in red at race course VIP
- Jamie Luk as One of Hung's thugs
- Wan Fat as One of Hung's thugs
- Wong Kwong-fai as One of Hung's thugs
- Lau Siu-cheung as Large Nurse
- Wong Man-shing as Rapist
- Lui Tat as Hospital patient
- Tin Kai-man as Hospital patient
- Teddy Chan as Bartender
- Eddie Chan as Mr. Cheung
- Zevia Tong as Mrs. Cheung
- Chan Choi-lin as Mrs. David Ho
- David Lai
- Sing Yan as Shapi Dog
- Hui Fan as Kei's mom
- Chan Wing-chiu as Tax inspector
- Cheng Chong as Rape victim
- Wong Man-kit
- Jacky Cheung
- Lee Tung-yue
- Yu Ngai-ho as Balding gangster
- Lam Ying-kit
- Cheung Kam-chuen
- Leung Kei-hei as Bettor at race VIP lounge
- Jameson Lam as Bettor at race VIP lounge
- Hui Si-man as Bettor at race VIP lounge
- Jim James as Bar customer
- Ho Chi-moon as Bar customer
- Hau Woon-ling as Sixth Grammy
- John Cheung as John
- Peter So as DJ
- Ernest Mauser as Priest at clinic
- Fei Pak as Policeman

== Theme song ==
- Two Hearts Know (兩心知)
  - Composer: R. Aska
  - Lyricist: Jolan Heung
  - Singer: Leon Lai

== Reception ==
=== Critical ===
Andrew Saroch of Far East Films rated the film 4 out of 5 stars and wrote "The Magic Touch features a constantly watchable narrative and a number of hilarious scenes; foremost among these is Hui's attempts to feel the villain's knuckles in a number of different and highly amusing situations."

=== Box office ===
The film grossed HK$36,399,307 at the Hong Kong box office during its theatrical run from 24 January to 19 February 1992 in Hong Kong. It remains as Michael Hui's highest-grossing film in his career.
