= Front Page (film) =

1990 Hong Kong film by Philip Chan

- Film poster
- Traditional Chinese: 新半斤八兩
- Simplified Chinese: 新半斤八两
- Hanyu Pinyin: Xīn Bàn Jīn Bā Liǎng
- Jyutping: San1 Bun3 Gan1 Baat3 Leong2
- Directed by: Philip Chan
- Screenplay by: Michael Hui; Philip Chan
- Based on: The Private Eyes by Michael Hui
- Produced by: Michael Hui
- Starring: Michael Hui; Samuel Hui; Ricky Hui
- Cinematography: Ardy Lam; Horace Wong
- Edited by: Ma Chung-yiu; Chu San-kit
- Music by: Chow Kai-sang
- Production company: Hui's Film Production
- Distributed by: Newport Entertainment
- Release date: 24 August 1990
- Running time: 96 minutes
- Country: Hong Kong
- Language: Cantonese
- Box office: HK$26,348,460

Front Page (Chinese: 新半斤八兩) is a 1990 Hong Kong comedy film directed by Philip Chan and starring Michael Hui, Samuel Hui and Ricky Hui. The film is a remake of the Hui Brothers' 1976 film, The Private Eyes.

== Plot ==
Hui (Michael Hui) is the chief editor of Truth Weekly (內幕周刊), an informational magazine that has been experiencing sluggish sales. Because of this, the magazine company is on the verge of closure. Martial arts instructor Mad Bill (Samuel Hui) was recently dismissed from his job and applies for a position at the magazine company. Bill proposes to Hui that they convert the magazine to cover entertainment news, especially scandals involving female celebrities. Hui accepts this idea, and the two of them work with another employee, Fly (Ricky Hui), to fabricate gossip for the next issue.

After receiving reports of ghost sightings at a music video shoot, the trio decide to dress Hui up as a ghost and photograph him on set to fabricate a scoop. However, Hui runs into another "ghost", who, unbeknownst to the trio, is part of a gang seeking to drive the filmmakers away from their area of operations. While escaping, Hui falls into a pit in the ground, and is rescued by Hui and Fly, who lose their negatives in the process.

The trio then decides to spy on Sandy Cheung (Catherine Hung), who has a reputation for purity and innocence in the entertainment industry, and is set to marry the son of a jewellery magnate. They follow her to a beauty salon, planning to take photos of her having a breast enlargement, hoping to cause a scandal, but she turns out to be there for routine skin care. Later, they feign disability to gain Sandy's sympathy, and succeed in taking intimate pictures of Sandy with Bill, to support an infidelity scandal about her.

The night before publishing the news, Bill and Fly's consciences catch up with them; they take the negatives of the photos and return them to Sandy at her engagement party. However, they run into the gangsters from the video shoot, who seize control of the venue. They take Sandy hostage to threaten her fiancé to hand them all the jewellery from his jewellery shop. During the debacle, Hui, Bill and Fly snap many photos of the robbery scene, but are exposed and restrained when one of the gangsters recognizes Hui from the video shoot. Sandy's fiancé also refuses to hand over his property and flees, putting Sandy's life on the line. As the gangsters move to execute Sandy, Bill and the trio resists the gangsters and rescues her. Truth Weekly is resurrected by its exclusive report of the robbery, which attracts wide sales and circulation. This leads to the robbers are being recognized and apprehended while attempting to flee from Hong Kong. Hui and his staff are awarded Good Citizen Awards and HK $800,000 cash by the police force, while Bill wins Sandy's heart.

== Cast ==
- Michael Hui as Hui (老許), boss and chief editor of Truth Weekly (內幕周刊)
- Samuel Hui as Mad Bill Lee (喪標), newcomer staff of Truth Weekly who had jobs as a salesman, taxi driver and martial arts instructor prior
- Ricky Hui as Fly (烏蠅), a staff member of Truth Weekly
- Catherine Hung as Sandy Cheung (張珊珊), a celebrity
- Louise Lee as Mrs. Hui, Hui's wife
- Lau Siu-ming as Brother Shun (順哥), leader of the gangsters
- Teresa Mo as Mrs. Ho (何雅祺), proprietor of "Truth Weekly's" office
- Paul Chun as Dr. Pong (龐醫生), a plastic surgeon
- Joe Tay as Sang (阿生), a staff member of Truth Weekly
- Winnie Lau as Pinky (萍萍), a staff member of Truth Weekly
- Tai Po as an angry stuntman after Hui
- Bonnie Fu as Robert's sister-in-law
- Yu Sin-man as Anita Mui
- Lee Hoi-sang as Dragon
- Lai Man-cheuk as Sloppy
- Teddy Yip as Kent (錦叔), a staff member of Truth Weekly
- May Law as May (八婆薇), a staff member of Truth Weekly
- Tsang Kan-wing as Mr. Leung (梁主任), a bank staff
- Stanley Hui as Police Commissioner
- Lawrence Lau as a martial arts student
- Yuen Shun-yee as martial arts master
- Chan Ka-pik as Dr. Pong's receptionist
- Mak Yan-wa as Dr. Pong's assistant
- Chiu Yun-kan as Robert Li
- Nip Pang-fung as a gangster
- Wan seung-lam as a gangster
- Chu Tat-wai as a gangster
- Kingdom Yuen as a late guest at Robert's ball
- Lau Chan-au as a late guest at Robert's ball
- Yu Kin-shing as Wong, a chauffeur
- Law Shu-kei as the orphanage principal
- Melvin Wong
- Roger Thomas as a party guest
- Ho Chi-moon as a party guest
- Cho Sai as a party guest
- Lee Wah-kon as a party guest
- Ng Wing-sum as a martial arts student

== Music ==
=== Theme song ===
- Don't Care About 97 (話知你97)
  - Composer/Lyricist/Singer: Samuel Hui

=== Insert theme ===
- Two Lonely People (兩個寂寞人)
  - Composer/Lyricist/Singer: Samuel Hui

== Reception ==
=== Critical ===
Andrew Saroch of Far East Films gave the film a score of four out of five stars, praising the confidence and slickness of the three lead actors and its slapstick and moral message, describes it as "sophisticated comedy". In the book, The Hong Kong Filmography, 1977–1997: A Reference Guide to 1,100 Films Produced by British Hong Kong Studios, John Charles gave the film a score of 5/10 and describes it as "short on fresh ideas", but "fairly pleasing if one's expectations are held in check."

== Box office ==
The film grossed HK$26,348,460 at the Hong Kong box office during its theatrical run from 24 August to 2 October 1990.

== Awards and nominations ==
Awards and nominations
Ceremony	Category	Recipient	Outcome
10th Hong Kong Film Awards	Best Actor	Michael Hui	Nominated
Hong Kong International Artists Association	Best Actor	Michael Hui	Won
