= Winner Takes All (2000 film) =

2000 Hong Kong film by Clifton Ko

- Film poster
- Traditional Chinese: 大贏家
- Simplified Chinese: 大赢家
- Hanyu Pinyin: Dà Yíng Jiā
- Jyutping: Daai6 Yeng4 Gaa1
- Directed by: Clifton Ko
- Written by: Karl Maka; Raymond Wong; Chang Kwok-tse
- Produced by: Karl Maka; Raymond Wong
- Starring: Sam Hui; Karl Maka; Nicholas Tse; Ruby Lin; Joey Yung; Alec Su; Annie Wu; Ricky Hui; Raymond Wong
- Cinematography: Horace Wong
- Edited by: Angie Lam; Marco Mak
- Music by: Marco Wan
- Production companies: Cinema City & Films Co. Mandarin Films
- Distributed by: Mandarin Films
- Release date: 29 January 2000
- Running time: 91 minutes
- Country: Hong Kong
- Language: Cantonese
- Box office: HK$10,030,582

Winner Takes All is a 2000 Hong Kong comedy film directed by Clifton Ko and featuring an ensemble cast. This film released was to celebrate Chinese New Year.

== Plot ==
Ferrari (Nicholas Tse), is a young swindler. He has been swindling people for money in many situations. One day, a cop nicknamed 'Stupid' (Karl Maka) is about to catch him swindling. He makes a deal with Ferrari to help him catch Master Swindler Wong (Sam Hui), the world's most notorious swindler who is penning his autobiography of his swindling ways. Ferrari runs into Bastardly Sze (Alec Su) who is stalking a rich woman and taking her pictures.

Paulina Wu (Joey Yung)'s father is one of the victims of the Master Castrator Swindler. So she decides to get her father's money back. On her trip, she runs into Bastardly Sze and Ferrari. The three wants swindle the girl, whom they think is Master Swindler Wong's daughter, Wu Sen Kwan (Ruby Lin).

With Wu Sen-kwan is her so-call assistant, Ching (Annie Wu). Ching and Ferrari once met before. Ferrari and Ching were going out on a date. Ching asked Ferrari wait for her to come, she never did. Later, he learned Ching had swindled him.

The group (Ferrari, Bastardly Sze, and Paulina) are following fake Swindler Wong's daughter to the boat. They have a plan to swindle her money. Ferrari pretends to be a priest. He asks Swindler Wong's daughter to donate $1 million for charity. During that time, Bastardly Sze is falling for Wu Sen-kwan. Paulina is jealous of Wu Sen Kwan because she likes Bastardly Sze. Sze feels bad in swindling Sen Kwan.

== Cast ==
- Nicholas Tse – Ferrari
- Ruby Lin – Wu Sen-kwan
- Annie Wu – Ching
- Joey Yung – Paulina Wu
- Alec Su – Bastardy Sze
- Raymond Wong – Father Wong
- Karl Maka – Inspector 'Stupid'
- Sam Hui – Master Swindler Wong
- Ricky Hui – Swindler Wong's brother
- Lisa Lui – Mrs. Chin
- Perry Chiu – Girl courted by Ferrari at telephone booth

== See also ==
- List of Hong Kong films
