= Ricky Hui =

Hong Kong actor and singer (1946-2011)

Ricky Hui Kwun-ying
- 許冠英
- Born: 3 August 1946; Panyu, Guangzhou, Guangdong, China
- Died: 8 November 2011 (aged 65); Kowloon Tong, Hong Kong
- Occupations: Actor; singer
- Years active: 1972–2011
- Height: 1.66 m (5 ft 5 1/2 in)

Chinese name
- Traditional Chinese: 許冠英
- Simplified Chinese: 许冠英
Transcriptions
Standard Mandarin
- Hanyu Pinyin: Xǔ Guànyīng
Yue: Cantonese
- Jyutping: Heoi2 Gun3jing1
- Musical career
- Genres: Cantopop
- Instrument: Vocals

Ricky Hui Kwun-ying (3 August 1946 – 8 November 2011) was a Hong Kong actor and singer. He along with his brothers, Michael and Sam, made several comedy blockbusters in the 1970s and 1980s.

== Biography ==
Hui was born in Panyu, Guangzhou. He and his family moved to Hong Kong in 1950.

Ricky worked as a correspondent for the Agence France-Presse in Hong Kong. He also frequently appeared in Shaw Brothers films between 1972 and 1976, such as The Lizard (1972), The 14 Amazons (1972), The Sugar Daddies (1973), The Generation Gap (1973), Rivals of Kung Fu (1974), Hong Kong 73 (1974) etc. For him the big break came when he joined his brothers on screen.

Hui's first major role was in Games Gamblers Play (1974) as a card player followed by The Last Message (1975) with a short appearance as a waiter. Ricky had a larger role in The Private Eyes (1976) and with that film a new era of the Hong Kong Cinema started. The Hui brothers' comedy films were an influential part of Hong Kong cinema. Their films were packed with visual gags and unique Cantonese humor. Although Ricky had only a small role in The Private Eyes, it remained one of the all time favorites among fans. According to Michael Hui, Ricky had only brief appearance in this film because at that time he had a contract with the Shaw Brothers. Reportedly, his contract with the Shaw Brothers ended around 1976, because the last Shaw Brothers film he appeared in was Challenge of the Masters that year. The following year found Ricky at Golden Harvest with a leading role in John Woo's Money Crazy as well as From Riches to Rags. In 1979 Games Gamblers Play was released in the Japanese market. For this edition Michael shot a new scene, a fight between Ricky and Sam on the beach, and replaced the original Sammo Hung vs Sam Hui fight with it. The next Hui brothers production where Ricky teamed up with his brothers again was The Contract in 1978, followed by Security Unlimited (1981), one of the most successful films featuring the Hui brothers; Security Unlimited was full of gags and included the Huis' trademark Cantonese humor. In the late 1970s and early 1980s Ricky played leading roles in John Woo films like From Riches To Rags (1979), To Hell with the Devil (1982) or Plain Jane To The Rescue (1982).

Michael became a producer in 1987 and Ricky appeared in his films: Chicken and Duck Talk (1988), Front Page (1990), The Magic Touch (1992). In 1985 Sammo Hung produced one of the biggest cult films Mr. Vampire where Ricky Hui played Man Choi, a memorable role on the side of the unforgettable (Lam Ching-ying).

Ricky was most active in his film career in the 1970s and 1980s. In the late 1990s he appeared in only one film, in First Love Unlimited (1997). He later rejoined his brother Sam in Winner Takes All (2000). The last films Ricky Hui appeared in were Super Model and Forever Yours, both from 2004.

== Death ==
Ricky Hui died of a heart attack at home on 8 November 2011 at the age of 65. His funeral was held at Po Fook Hill Memorial Hall in Sha Tin, and was attended by dozens of guests and relatives. His family followed his wishes to put his ashes to sea in Sai Kung. 8th November also is the death day of Lam Ching-ying, who was Ricky Hui's partner in "Mr. Vampire".

== Filmography ==
Year	Title	Role	Notes
1972	A Girl Fighter		
1972	The 14 Amazons		
1972	The Lizard		
1972	Man of Iron		
1972	Thunderbolt Fist		
1973	The Delinquent	Kung fu student	Uncredited
1973	The Generation Gap		
1973	Kiss of Death		
1973	The Mandarin		
1973	Illicit Desire		
1973	The House of 72 Tenants		
1973	The Sugar Daddies	Hsiao Sun	
1973	The Iron Bodyguard	Thief	
1974	The Ghost Lovers		
1974	Wu yi		
1974	Shao Lin zi di		
1974	Hong Kong 73		
1974	Sex, Love and Hate		
1974	Rivals of Kung Fu		
1974	Sinful Confession	Hentai voyeur	
1974	Games Gamblers Play	Gambler at Beach	
1974	Kidnap	Casino Assistant	
1975	The Flying Guillotine	Cheng Ziping	
1975	E ba		
1975	The Last Message	Waiter on Skates	
1976	Challenge of the Masters	Lung	
1976	Gui cai Lun Wen Xu	Lao Tzu	
1976	Bao biao		
1976	The Private Eyes	Pighead	
1977	Money Crazy	Poison	
1978	Gou yao gou gu		(Guest star)
1978	The Contract	Frog	
1978	Da lin ba		(Guest star)
1980	From Riches to Rags	Ricky	
1981	Security Unlimited	Bruce Tang	
1982	To Hell with the Devil	Bruce	
1982	Plain Jane to the Rescue	Fang	
1983	The Trail	Ying	
1984	Aces Go Places III: Our Man from Bond Street	Puffer Fish	
1985	Infatuation		
1985	Mr. Vampire	Man Choi	
1986	Happy Ding Dong	Butcher's Son	
1986	Naughty Boys	Cab Driver	(Guest star)
1986	Chocolate Inspector	Egg-Tart	
1987	Project A Part II	Homely Cop	
1987	The Haunted Cop Shop	Man-Chill	
1988	Who Is the Craftiest		
1988	The Inspector Wears Skirts	Cook	
1988	The Haunted Cop Shop 2	Man-Chill	
1988	Chicken and Duck Talk	Cuttlefish	
1988	Stumbling Cops		
1988	Operation Pink Squad	Dumb Ying	
1989	Mr. Coconut	Lime	
1989	The Inspector Wears Skirts 2	Cook	
1989	Miracles	Lady Rose's Friend	
1989	Forever Young		
1989	How to Be a Millionaire... Without Really Trying	Charles	
1990	Front Page	Fly	
1991	Ghost for Sales		
1992	The Magic Touch	Fat	
1992	Mr. Vampire 1992	Man Choi	
1993	All's Well, Ends Well Too	Lady Chow	
1993	Laughter of the Water Margins	Hsimen Kuan	
1997	First Love Unlimited	Uncle Wing	
2000	Winner Takes All	Swindler Wong's brother	
2004	Super Model	Model King	
2004	Forever Yours	Leo	
2005	Divergence	Yiu's Bodyguard	(final film role)
