= Yan Pak =

Chinese actress from Hong Kong

- Chinese: 白茵
- Born: Wai-yin Chan; November 30, 1942 (age 83); Kuala Lumpur, Malaysia
- Other names: Bak Yan, Pah Yun, Bai Yin, Chen Hui-Xian, Chan Wai-Hin, Wai-yin Chan
- Occupation: Actress
- Years active: 1959–2014

Yan Pak (Chinese: 白茵) is a Chinese former actress from Hong Kong. Pak is credited with over 55 films and many TVB series.

== Early life ==
On November 30, 1942, Pak was born as Wai-yin Chan in Kuala Lumpur, Malaysia.

== Career ==
In 1959, Pak became a Hong Kong actress and debuted in The Fake Marriage (aka Great Pretender), a 1959 comedy film directed by Lo Duen. Pak was a lead actress in many drama and comedy films including Affectionately Yours (1960), The Great Devotion (aka Love Cannot Read) (1960), So Siu Siu (1962), The Eternal Beauty of Hsi-Shih (aka Hsi Shih: The Beauty of Beauty) (1965), and Chicken and Duck Talk (1988). Pak's last film was Street Angels, a 1996 triad film directed by Billy Tang Hin-Shing. In the 1980s, Pak joined TVB and became active in television series including The Duke of Mount Deer (1984 TV series), The Return of Luk Siu Fung (1986 TV series), and All That is Bitter is Sweet (2014 TV Series). In 2012, Pak retired from acting. Pak's last television series was in 2014. Pak is credited with over 55 films and many TVB series.

== Filmography ==
=== Films ===
This is a partial list of films.

- 1959 The Fake Marriage (aka Great Pretender)
- 1960 Affectionately Yours
- 1960 The Great Devotion (aka Love Cannot Read)
- 1962 So Siu Siu
- 1965 The Eternal Beauty of Hsi-Shih (aka Hsi Shih: The Beauty of Beauty)
- 1967 The Divorce Brinkmanship
- 1994 Drunken Master II (aka Drunken Master 2, Legend of the Drunken Master) - Mrs. Chan
- 1988 Chicken and Duck Talk - Tammy's mother

=== Television ===
This is a partial list of TV series. Pak is mostly credited as Bak Yan.

- 1981 Yeung Female Warriors (TV series) - Princess Chai
- 1984 The Duke of Mount Deer (TV series)
- 1986 The Return of Luk Siu Fung (TV series)
- 1986 New Heavenly Sword and Dragon Sabre (TV series) - Wong Nan Gu
- 2012 Silver Spoon, Sterling Shackles (TV series)
- 2014 All That is Bitter is Sweet (TV Series) - Ling Fung Yee

== Personal life ==
Pak's husband is Wong Man-wai, a footballer who competed at the 1960 Summer Olympics.
