= Mr. Coconut =

1989 Hong Kong film by Clifton Ko

- DVD cover
- Traditional Chinese: 合家歡
- Simplified Chinese: 合家欢
- Hanyu Pinyin: hé jiā huān
- Jyutping: hap6 gaa1 fan1
- Directed by: Clifton Ko
- Written by: Clifton Ko; Raymond Wong; Michael Hui
- Produced by: Clifton Ko
- Starring: Michael Hui; Raymond Wong; Ricky Hui; Olivia Cheng; Joey Wong; Simon Yam; Tony Leung Ka-fai; Maria Cordero
- Cinematography: Ka Ko Lee; Jingle Ma
- Edited by: Wong Yee-Shun
- Music by: Richard Yuen
- Production companies: Hui's Film Production Co., Ltd.
- Release dates: 21 January 1989 (Hong Kong); 6 February 1989 (Taiwan)
- Running time: 100 minutes
- Country: Hong Kong
- Language: Cantonese
- Box office: HK$31,246,945

Mr. Coconut (Chinese: 合家歡; pinyin: hé jiā huān) is a 1989 Hong Kong comedy film directed by Clifton Ko. It stars Michael Hui, Raymond Wong Pak-ming, Ricky Hui, Olivia Cheng and Joey Wong.

== Plot ==
Ngan Kwai-Nam lives in Hainan Island and is used to the culture of villages and simple life that villagers have. One day, he gets a letter form his sister Ping and visits his sister in Hong Kong, as he endures the modern culture and the Hong Kong streets of the late 1980s. However, Ping's husband Wong Ka-Fan is struggling to get along with Nam such as almost got him fired from the shoe store, making chaos in buffet restaurant and smoking in the house. Although Nam gets the job at the shoe store but shortly got fired after unknowingly attacked Wong Ka-Fan's boss at the pool in her mansion.

When Ling gets invited by her boyfriend Timothy to the museum, Nam once again continued to smoke but secretly spits in the pots and hiding in the mummy's tomb to smoke but got caught, which led Timothy broke up with Ling.

Nam won the ticket to London and Lime, who used to work as a manager now as an insurance salesman, teaches him about the insurance. During the trip to London, Nam's plane got crashed in Egypt and killed every passengers, which lead the family believe that Nam is dead but Nam is revealed that he didn't board on the plane but instead boarded on Africa. He was then sent back to Hong Kong with the help of African soldiers. Wong Ka-Fan and his family was shocked to see Nam alive but they hid him without letting the insurance company know about Nam's living as they knew that the insurance company will not be paying them. When Lime visit the family, Nam posed as a ghost to scare Lime away, when the insurance manager and the workers have arrived, Nam escapes through the window but accidentally falls on the clothes hanger, which he unintentionally scares away Lime again. Nam tries to jump on the light pole but fell on the cement mixer.

Wong Ka-Fan requests on leave to visit Nam in the hospital, but his boss refused to do so and threatens to fire him if he ever walks out of the store, Wong Ka-Fan then stands up to his boss and quits his job. Lime, whose hair is all white in the wheelchair, was shocked to see Nam again, and Nam proves to Lime that he is not the ghost, which causes Lime to laugh and his hair changed back to normal and walks out the hospital.

When Nam is about to leave Hong Kong, he and Wong Ka-Fan spots the passenger, who harasses women and framed Wong Ka-Fan on the train earlier, he then takes revenge on him and stops him from harassing the woman again. Nam bids farewell to the family when the train leaves.

== Cast ==
- Michael Hui as Ngan Kwai-Nam (雁歸南) - mainland villager
- Raymond Wong Pak-ming as Wong Ka-Fan (黃嘉範) - shoe store manager, Kwai-Nam's brother-in-law
- Olivia Cheng as Ping (雁燕萍) - Kwai-Nam's sister, married to Ka-Fan
- Chan Cheuk Yan as Skinny (奀珠) - Ka-Fan and Ping's daughter
- Ricky Hui as Lime (經紀拉) - manager, later insurance salesman
- Joey Wong as Ling (黃嘉玲) - flight attendant, Ka-Fan's sister
- Simon Yam as Timothy Hui (許公子) - son of a rich family, Ling's crush
- Maria Cordero as Miss Ma (老闆娘) - owner of the shoe store Ka-Fan worked at
- Tony Leung Ka-fai as Bush (高富帥) - Joey's boyfriend, short cameo and only mentioned at the end of the movie
- San Wong as Mr Hui (許先生) - Timothy's father
- Sin Huang Tam as Miss Hui (許太太) - Timothy's mother
- Lowell Lo as Fengshui expert on TV
- Pak-Kwong Ho as Taoist priest
- Ken Boyle as insurance company manager - Mandarin dubbing
- Yung-kuang Lai as Insurance company worker
- Fan Hui as Building Cleaner
- Catherine Lau as Miss Ma's maid
- Ernst Mausser as plane passenger at Bombay airport
- Simon Yip as buffet customer
- Clifton Ko as television show host (cameo)
- Fennie Yuen as subway passenger (cameo)
- Hsiu-Ling Lu as girl at railway station (cameo)
- Loletta Lee as television shampoo commercial girl (cameo)
- Pauline Kwan as party guest girl (cameo)
- Yonfan as annoyed buffet customer (cameo)
- Wing-Cho Yip as tofo seller (cameo)
- Elsie Chan as shoe store customer (cameo)

== Awards and nominations ==
Awards and nominations
| Ceremony | Category | Recipient | Outcome | Ref. |
|---|---|---|---|---|
| 9th Hong Kong Film Awards | Best Actor | Michael Hui | Nominated | |
