= Lotus (Hong Kong band) =

Pop/rock band in hong Kong

- Born: Hong Kong
- Years active: 1966–present

Chinese name
Transcriptions
Standard Mandarin
- Hanyu Pinyin: lian2 hua1 luo4 dui4
Yue: Cantonese
- Jyutping: lin4 faa1 ngok6 deoi6
- Musical career
- Origin: Hong Kong
- Genres: Hong Kong English pop
- Instruments: Guitar, drums
- Members: Samuel Hui (許冠傑); David Cheung (張浚英); Danny So (蘇雄); Albert Li (李松江); Wallace Chow (周華年)

The Lotus was a popular English pop/rock band in Hong Kong in the 1960s. The most notable member was Samuel Hui.

== Career ==
The band along with Roman and the Four Steps was noteworthy for singing in English and often singing British and American songs.

== Instruments ==
- Samuel Hui – lead vocal
- Danny So (蘇雄) – bass guitar
- David Cheung (張浚英) – drums
- Albert Li (李松江) – rhythm guitar
- Wallace Chow (周華年) – lead guitar
