= Michael Hui =

Hong Kong comedian and filmmaker (born 1942)

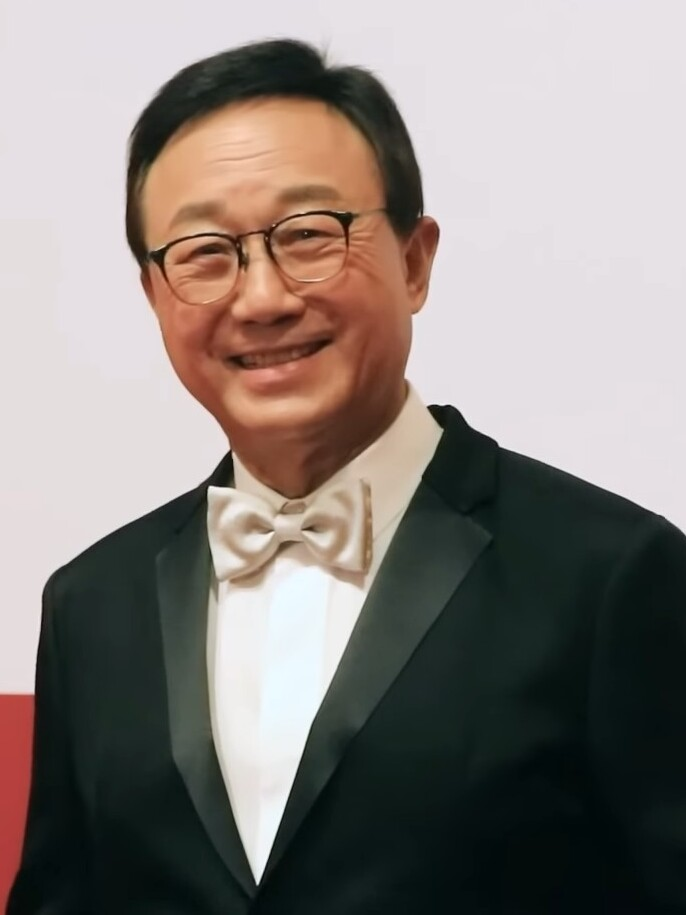
- Hui at the 2022 Hong Kong Film Awards
- Born: 3 September 1942 (age 83); Panyu, Guangdong, China
- Occupations: Actor; playwright; director; producer
- Years active: 1968–present
- Spouse: Cheng Kit-ying (m. 1972)
- Children: 2
- Relatives: Ricky Hui (brother); Sam Hui (brother)
- Awards: Hong Kong Film Awards – Best Actor; 1981 Security Unlimited

Chinese name
- Traditional Chinese: 許冠文
- Simplified Chinese: 许冠文
Transcriptions
Standard Mandarin
- Hanyu Pinyin: Xǔ Guànwén
Yue: Cantonese
- Yale Romanization: Héui Gun Màhn
- Jyutping: Heoi2 Gun3 Man4
- Musical career
- Also known as: Cool-faced comedian, Mr. Boo! (in Japan)
- Origin: Hong Kong

Michael Hui Koon-man (born Chinese: 許冠文; 3 September 1942; also known as Mr Boo!) is a Hong Kong actor, comedian, scriptwriter and director. He is the eldest of the four Hui brothers (together with Ricky, Sam, and Stanley), who were prominent figures in the Hong Kong entertainment industry during the 1970s and the 1980s. Michael Hui is considered by many critics to be one of the foremost comedians in the Hong Kong film industry.

== Education ==
Hui studied in La Salle College, and then earned a degree in sociology from the United College, the Chinese University of Hong Kong.

== Career ==
After a spell hosting quiz shows on TVB, Hui gained popularity in the Hong Kong entertainment industry with his variety show stints in the Hui Brothers Show. He then moved from television to film. Hui's first work was in a film by Taiwanese director Li Han-hsiang called The Warlord (大軍閥 or "The Great Regime", 1972), where he played a farcical warlord in post-revolutionary China.

In 1974, he set up his own film company, the Hui Film Company, with Golden Harvest, with his brothers Ricky and Sam. Between 1974 and 2000 he created more than 20 comedy films, five of which were Hong Kong's No. 1 box-office hit of the year.

The earliest Hui comedies combined episodic gags with the comedic appeal of Michael and his brothers. This usually involved the trio of actors—Michael, Sam and Ricky—pitting their wits against the odds to earn quick bucks and their livelihood. Set in modern-day Hong Kong, with upbeat soundtracks performed by Sam himself, these works became wildly popular amongst the working classes in the 1970s and early 1980s. Games Gamblers Play (1974), The Private Eyes (1976), The Contract (1978) and Security Unlimited (1981) – the last of which won him the first Hong Kong Film Award for Best Actor – are often seen as the quintessential comedies made by the company. Games Gamblers Play was a huge success when first released and paved the way for Cantonese movies to hold their own against the colonial trend of Mandarin production.

In the 1980s, Hui developed a new brand of satirical comedy, one which capitalised on his deadpan comic timing, using a more character-driven storyline. Some of his more renowned works came during this period in the 1980s. Hui frequently acted out the archetypal "ne'er-do-well" driven on by a cash-mad Hong Kong society. Equally caustic and funny, they are set against the backdrop of present-day Hong Kong consumerism. He would make a rare North American film appearance as the Subaru mechanic/engineer with Jackie Chan in the Burt Reynolds comedy The Cannonball Run. In Chocolate Inspector (1986), he plays a chocolate-eating inspector who must solve a kidnap case while his subordinate is involved in a Miss Hong Kong pageant. In Chicken and Duck Talk (1988), opposing restaurateurs come to blows to secure profits. Front Page (1990), which reunited the three brothers, lampoons the Hong Kong press, while The Magic Touch (1992) satirises the Chinese obsession with fortune-telling and wealth. Always on My Mind (1993) continues in this vein of self-deprecating humour: Hui plays the head of a family, a news anchor, who will stop at nothing to grab money.

Hui continued acting and producing his own comedies, at a less prolific rate, in the 1990s and 2000s. He wrote a dozen screenplays, but none were produced because he felt dissatisfied. Chinese Box (1997), directed by Wayne Wang, remains Hui's only starring film in the West. He played a talented safe-cracker, who kidnaped a baby for money from triads but was kind-hearted and dignified, in the action-comedy Rob-B-Hood (2006), starring alongside Jackie Chan and Louis Koo. In 2006, he became the host of the quiz show Deal or No Deal. In 2016, he starred in the Taiwanese black comedy film, Godspeed, for which he is nominated the Golden Horse Award for Best Leading Actor.

Organised by the Hong Kong Arts Development Council (HKADC), the 15th Hong Kong Arts Development Awards was held on 30 October 2021. Hui was one of the recipients of the Award for Outstanding Contribution in Arts, for his active involvements in filmmaking as a director, a screenwriter and actor.

== Filmography ==
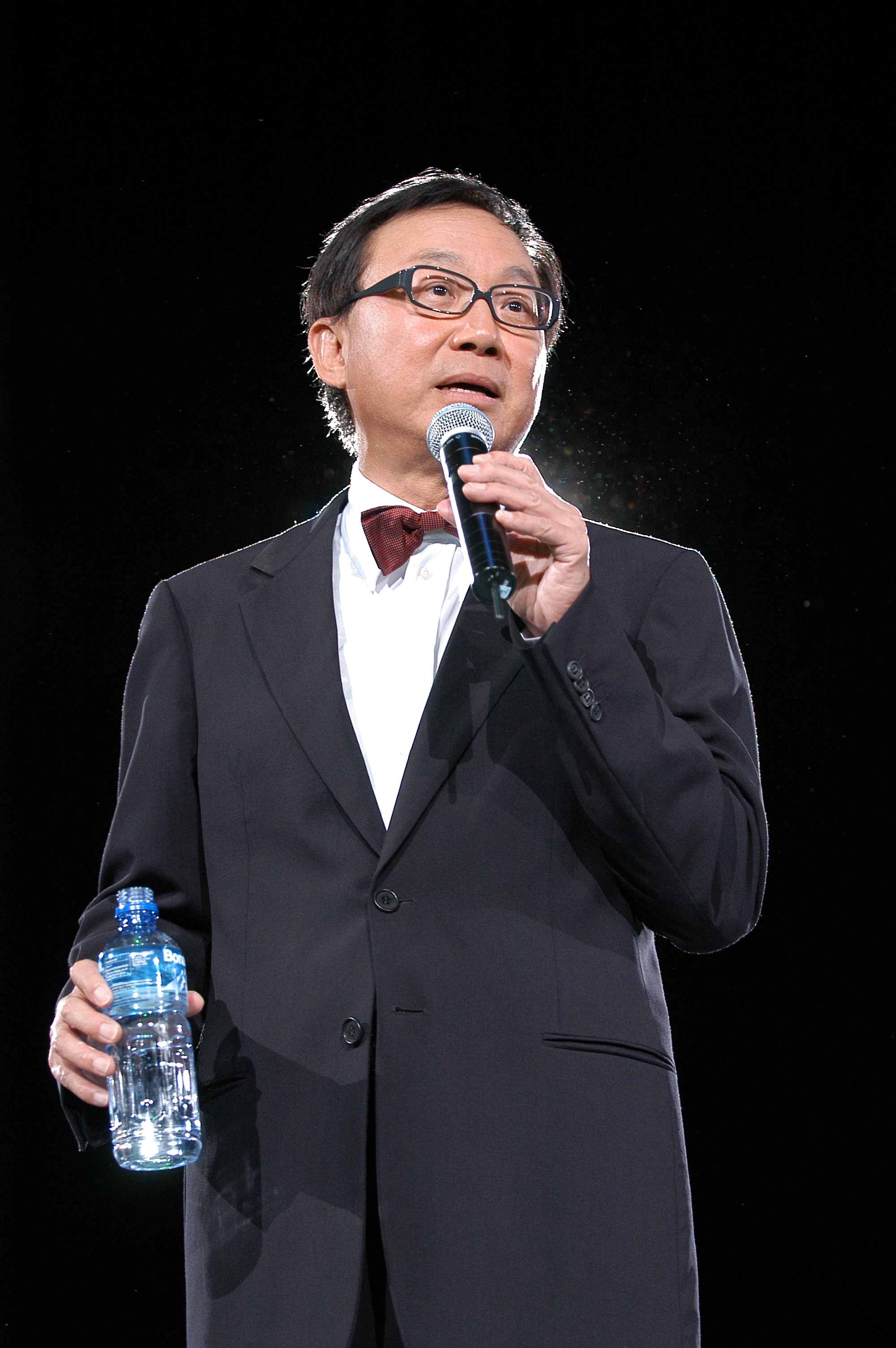
Hui in 2005

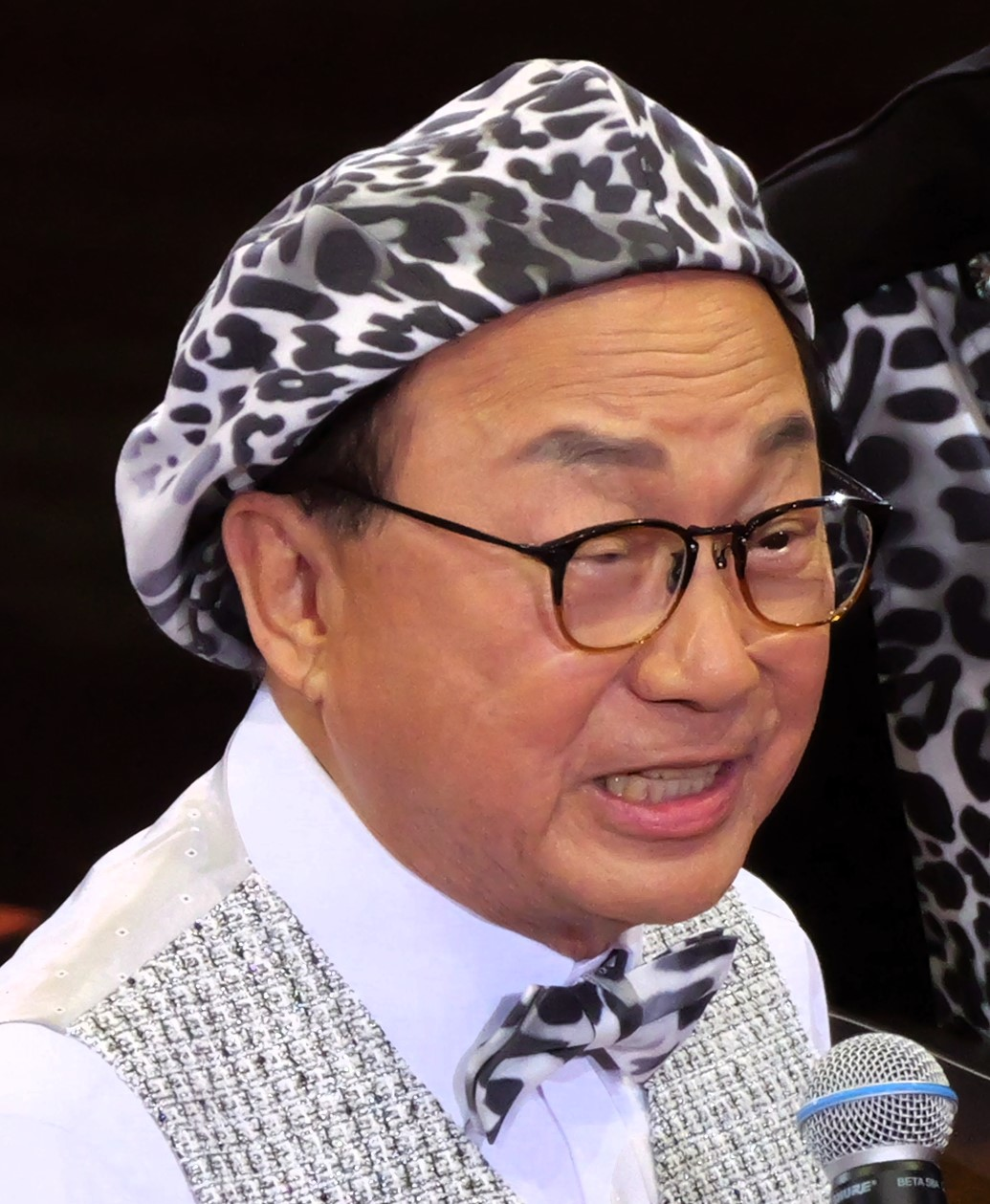
Hui in 2024

=== Acting roles ===
Year	Film title in English	Film title in Chinese	Role	Notes
1972	The Warlord	大軍閥		
1973	The Happiest Moment	一樂也	Ren Letien/Chief Supt/Md Fuyu/Xiao Liu	
1973	Sinful Confession	聲色犬馬		
1974	Scandal	醜聞		
1974	Games Gamblers Play	鬼馬雙星	Man	
1975	The Last Message	天才與白痴	Tim	
1976	The Private Eyes	半斤八兩	Wong Yeuk-sze	
1978	The Contract	賣身契	Sit Chi-man	
1981	The Cannonball Run	砲彈飛車	Driver	
1981	Security Unlimited	摩登保鑣	Chow Sai-cheung	
1984	Teppanyaki	鐵板燒		
1985	Mr. Boo Meets Pom Pom	智勇三寶	Mr. Boo	
1986	Happy Ding Dong	歡樂叮噹		
1986	Chocolate Inspector	神探朱古力	Inspector Chu Koo-lik	
1988	Chicken and Duck Talk	雞同鴨講	Hui	
1989	Mr. Coconut	合家歡	Ngan Kwai-Na	
1990	Front Page	新半斤八兩	Hui	
1991	The Banquet	豪門夜宴	Michael Hui	
1992	Hero of the Beggars	丐世英雄		
1992	The Magic Touch	神算	Hui Wai-kuk	
1993	Always on My Mind	搶錢夫妻		
1995	Wealthy Human Realm	富貴人間		
1997	Chinese Box		Chang	
2000	Funny Business	創業玩家		
2004	Fantasia	鬼馬狂想曲	Grand Wizard	
2004	Three of a Kind	煎釀叄寶	Dragon Lone	
2006	Rob-B-Hood	寶貝計劃	The landlord	
2012	The Bounty	懸紅	Cho Sai Fung's bounty hunting mentor	
2014	Delete My Love	Delete愛人	Rich Ma	
2016	Godspeed	一路順風	Old Hui	
2018	Agent Mr Chan	棟篤特工		
2021	All U Need Is Love	總是有愛在隔離		
2023	Where the Wind Blows	風再起時	George Lee	
2024	The Last Dance	破·地獄	Master Man	
2024	The Prosecutor	誤判	Grand Judge	
TBD	Raging Havoc	怒火漫延		

=== Films directed, written or produced ===
Year	Film	Director	Writer	Producer	Notes
1974	Games Gamblers Play	Yes	Yes		
1975	The Last Message	Yes	Yes		
1976	The Private Eyes	Yes	Yes		
1978	The Contract	Yes	Yes		
1981	Security Unlimited	Yes			
1984	Teppanyaki	Yes	Yes		Shot in the Philippines
1986	Happy Din Don	Yes	Yes		
1986	Chocolate Inspector		Yes	Yes	
1988	Chicken and Duck Talk		Yes		
1989	Mr. Coconut		Yes		
1990	Front Page		Yes	Yes	
1992	The Magic Touch	Yes	Yes	Yes	
1993	Always on my Mind			Yes	

== Awards and nominations ==
Year	Award	Category	Nominated work	Result	Ref.
1982	Hong Kong Film Awards	Best Actor	Security Unlimited	Won	
2022	Hong Kong Film Awards	Lifetime Achievement Award	–	Won	
2023	Hong Kong Film Awards	Best Supporting Actor	Where the Wind Blows	Won	

== See also ==
- Cinema of Hong Kong
