= Orange Sky Golden Harvest =

Hong Kong film production company

Orange Sky Golden Harvest Entertainment (Holdings) Limited
- Native name: 橙天嘉禾娛樂集團有限公司
- Romanized name: Cháangtīn Gāwòh Yùhlohk Jaahptyùhn Yáuhhaahn Gūngsī
- Formerly: Golden Harvest (HK) Limited (1970–1994); Golden Harvest Entertainment (Holdings) Limited (1994–2009)
- Type: Public company
- Traded as: SEHK: 1132
- Industry: Film production
- Predecessors: Orange Sky Entertainment Group (2004–2009)
- Founded: 1970; 55 years ago
- Founder: Raymond Chow; Leonard Ho; Peter Choi
- Headquarters: 16th floor, The Peninsula Office Tower; 18 Middle Road, Tsim Sha Tsui, Kowloon, Hong Kong
- Key people: Raymond Chow; Leonard Ho; Peter Choi
- Products: Motion pictures
- Website: osgh.com.hk

Orange Sky Golden Harvest
- Traditional Chinese: 橙天嘉禾娛樂集團有限公司
- Simplified Chinese: 橙天嘉禾娱乐集团有限公司
Transcriptions
Standard Mandarin
- Hanyu Pinyin: Chéngtiān jiāhé yúlè jítuán gōngsī
- Wade–Giles: Ch'engt'ian chiahe yüle chit'uan yuhsienkungszu
- Yale Romanization: Chéngtyān jyāhé yúlè jítwán yǒusyàngūngsz̄
Yue: Cantonese
- Yale Romanization: Cháangtín gáawòh yùhlohk jaahptyùhn gūngsì
- Jyutping: Caang2tin1 gaa1wo4 jyu4lok6 zaap6tyun4 gung1si1
- IPA: [tsʰǎːŋtʰɪ́n káːwɔ̏ː jy̏ːlɔ̀ːk tsàːptʰy̏ːn jɐ̬uhàːŋkʊ́ŋsî]

Orange Sky Golden Harvest (OSGH) (Chinese: 橙天嘉禾娛樂集團有限公司; Cantonese Yale: Cháangtīn Gāwòh Yùhlohk Jaahptyùhn Yáuhhaahn Gūngsī), previously known as Golden Harvest Entertainment Group (Chinese: 嘉禾娛樂事業集團有限公司; Cantonese Yale: Gāwòh Yùhlohk Sihyihp Jaahptyùhn Yáuhhaahn Gūngsī) from 1970 to 2009, is a film production, distribution, and exhibition company based in Hong Kong. It dominated Hong Kong cinema box office sales from the 1970s to the 1980s, and played a major role in introducing Hong Kong action films to the world, especially those by Bruce Lee (Concord Production Inc.), Jackie Chan, Jet Li, and Sammo Hung.

Logo used before films from 1978 until 2003.

== History ==
Notable names in the company include its founders, the veteran film producers Raymond Chow, Peter Choi, and Leonard Ho. Chow, Ho and Choi were executives with Hong Kong's top studio Shaw Brothers but left in 1970 to form their own studio. They succeeded by taking a different approach from the highly centralised Shaw model. Golden Harvest contracted with independent producers and gave talent more generous pay and greater creative freedom. Some filmmakers and actors from Shaw Brothers defected. But what really put the company on the map was a 1971 deal with soon-to-be martial arts superstar Bruce Lee to star in the film The Big Boss, after he had turned down the low-paying standard contract offered him by the Shaws. Golden Harvest's films with Lee were the first Hong Kong films to reach a large worldwide audience.

In 1973, Golden Harvest entered into a pioneering co-production with Hollywood for the English-language Bruce Lee film, Enter the Dragon (龍爭虎鬥), a worldwide hit made with the Warner Bros. studio and Concord Production Inc.

Following Lee's death, Golden Harvest found success with the Hui Brothers' comedies such as Games Gamblers Play (1974), The Last Message (1975), The Private Eyes (1976), The Contract (1978) and Security Unlimited (1981). The studio supplanted Shaw Brothers as Hong Kong's dominant studio by the end of the 1970s and retained that position into the 1990s.

Golden Harvest developed a worldwide film distribution operation and started producing films for an international market and had released eight by 1980, including The Amsterdam Kill (1978) starring Robert Mitchum and The Boys in Company C (1978) directed by Sidney J. Furie. It also released Jackie Chan's first film for the international market, The Big Brawl (1980), although it did not match the success of Enter the Dragon. In 1981, The Cannonball Run was a big hit. The studio also made Tom Selleck's first two films with him in a starring role, High Road to China (1983) and Lassiter (1984). Following the disappointing performance of these and others, Golden Harvest quietly withdrew from the US market.

From the 1980s until the early 2000's, the studio produced almost all of the films of Jackie Chan, the studio's greatest asset for years. Golden Harvest has also produced a number of films with Jet Li, Cynthia Rothrock and Donnie Yen.

Starting in 1990, Golden Harvest had a big international success again with the Teenage Mutant Ninja Turtles trilogy. Allegedly, the company once attempted to produce a Daimajin film by starring Kevin Costner.

In 1992, Golden Village, a 50:50 joint venture between Golden Harvest and Village Roadshow of Australia was set up to develop and operate modern, multiplex cinemas in Singapore. In 1993, Golden Harvest sold its film library to Star TV.

Golden Harvest was listed on the Hong Kong Stock Exchange in 1994.

Golden Harvest's activity has declined since the death of Leonard Ho in 1998. In 2003, they withdrew from film-making to concentrate on film financing, distribution, and cinema management in Hong Kong and in Mainland China.

In 2004, Li Ka-shing and EMI became shareholders of the company. In 2007, Raymond Chow sold the company to Chinese businessman Wu Kebo, who owns the China-based Orange Sky Entertainment Group that was founded in 2004. In early 2009, Golden Harvest merged with Orange Sky and was renamed Orange Sky Golden Harvest (橙天嘉禾娛樂集團有限公司). From 2009 to 2011, it was operated by Kelvin Wu King Shiu who become the CEO of the company. At that time, Golden Harvest announced their relaunch and previewed a new trailer set for movies in 2010.

In October 2017, Golden Harvest acquired the other 50% stake of Golden Village from its joint venture partner, Village Roadshow, thereby gaining full ownership of Golden Village. This was after a prior bid by Singaporean film company Mm2 Entertainment to acquire the Village Roadshow stake in June 2017, as Village Roadshow failed to secure the approval of Golden Harvest. It is unknown whether the Village name will be dropped from Golden Village as a result of the acquisition.

== Cinemas ==
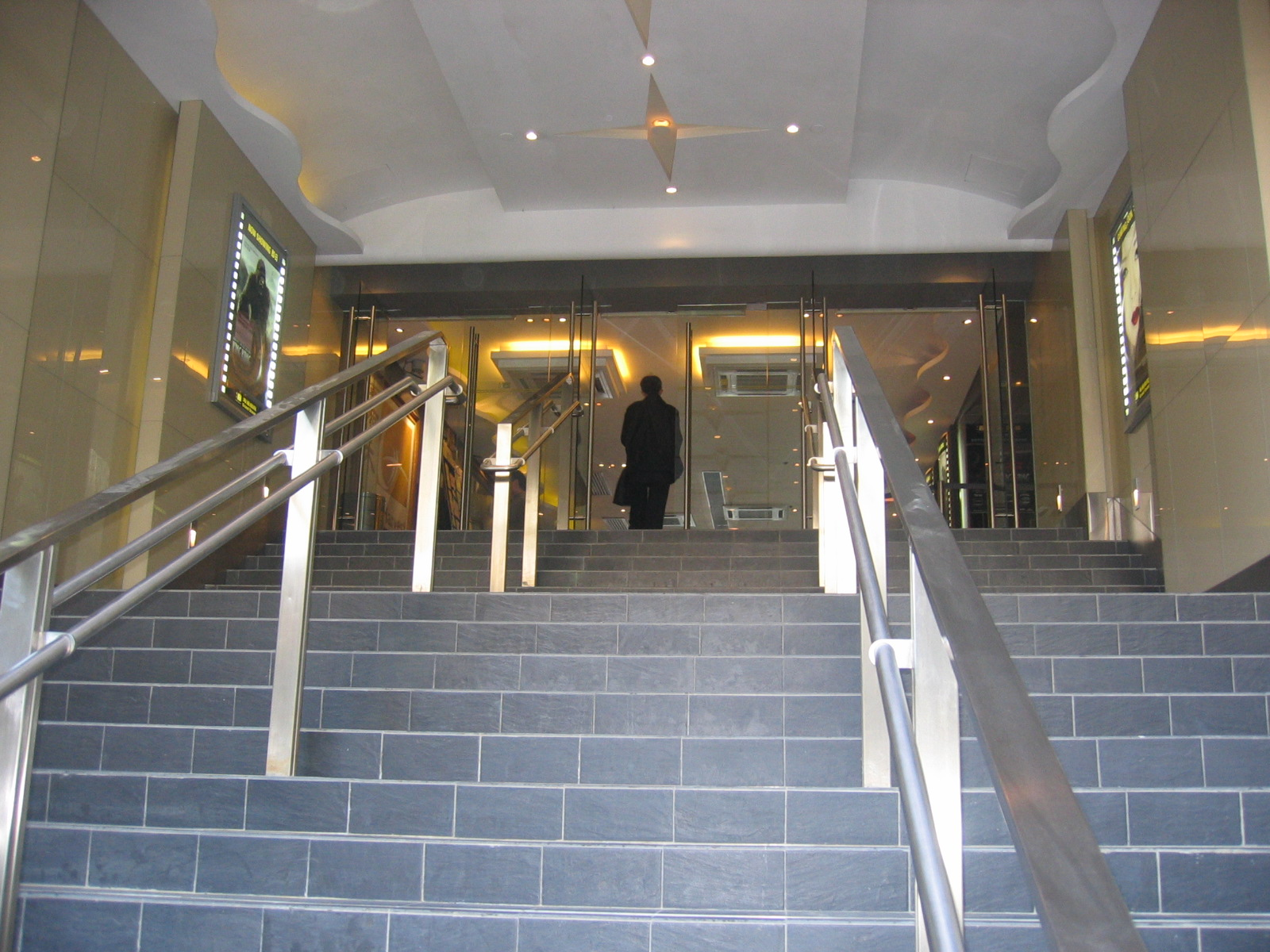
Entrance to Grand Ocean Cinema at Harbour City

Orange Sky Golden Harvest has cinemas not only in Hong Kong, but also in Mainland China, Taiwan, and Singapore. Most of these are joint ventures. Golden Village, now fully owned by Orange Sky Golden Harvest, was a former joint venture with Village Roadshow responsible for the operation of Gold Class cinemas and Asia's first multiplex.

In Malaysia, the group was instrumental in the formation of the country's two largest cinema chains: Golden Screen Cinemas, a joint venture with Malaysia's PPB Group who bought out Golden Harvest's stake for full ownership, and TGV Cinemas (formerly Tanjong Golden Village), a joint venture with Tanjong of Malaysia and Village Roadshow of Australia, the former having bought out the remaining stakes for full ownership.

In June 2025, Orange Sky Golden Harvest Entertainment (Holdings) Limited has announced the termination of leases for its remaining four cinemas by June 29, discontinuing all cinema operations in Hong Kong. Except GH Galaxy Plaza, all the cinemas were taken over by Shanghai Xingyi Cinema.

The company has recently acquired Warner Village in Taiwan.

== See also ==
- Cinema of Hong Kong
- Hong Kong action cinema
- Mei Ah Entertainment
