= Gracie Rivera =

Filipina singer and actress

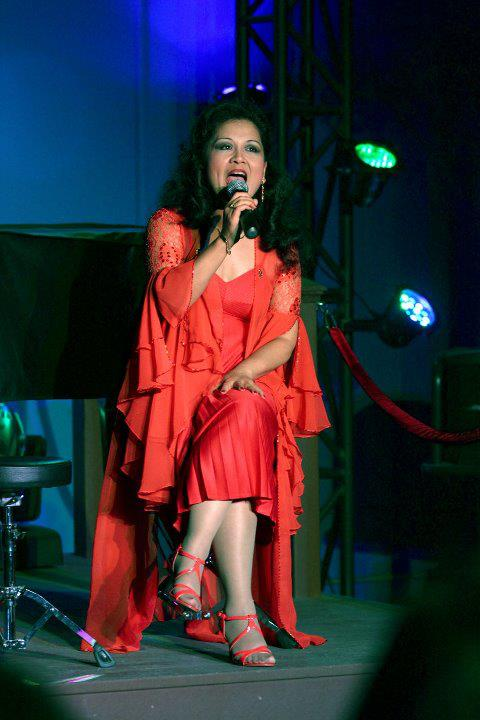
- Rivera performing in Los Angeles in 2012

Background information
- Also known as: Grace Anne Rivera; Grace Rivera
- Born: 9 June 1958 (age 68); Sabah, North Borneo
- Genres: pop; Hong Kong English pop
- Occupations: Singer; actress
- Instruments: Vocals, Guitar, Piano, Organ, Melodica, and Recorder
- Years active: 1977–1991
- Label: EMI (Hong Kong)

Chinese name
- Traditional Chinese: 利慧詩
Transcriptions
Yue: Cantonese
- Jyutping: lei6 wai6 si1

Gracie Rivera, also credited as Grace Anne Rivera (Chinese: 利慧詩; born 9 June 1958), is a Filipina singer and actress based in Hong Kong. She recorded five albums for EMI (Hong Kong) between 1977 and 1979. Her self-titled second album received a local Gold Disc sales certification from the IFPI (Hong Kong Group) in 1978. It had reached number one on the Hong Kong album chart published in the South China Morning Post in September 1977, and her recording of "The Bird and the Child" topped the newspaper's Hong Kong chart in October 1977.

Rivera continued to perform across the region into the 1980s, singing in English, Cantonese and Tagalog in concert theatres and supper clubs, and appeared as a guest performer at the fifth Hong Kong Gold Disc Award Presentation in 1981. She also worked as an actress, taking the lead role in the stage play Bingo at the 1986 Hong Kong Fringe Festival and in an episode of the RTHK drama series City Life broadcast in 1991.

== Career ==
=== Background and 1976 Talent Quest ===
Rivera was born in Sabah, North Borneo on 9 June 1958. She is of Filipino descent and was based in Hong Kong during her performing career. She had no formal music training beyond singing in her school choir, and gave up a course in business administration to pursue a career in singing. She won the 1976 Hong Kong Talent Quest, and went on to sign recording contracts and tour overseas across Asia, the Middle East, and North America.

The Talent Quest was an amateur music competition organised by The Star, Hong Kong's first English-language tabloid newspaper, held at Hong Kong City Hall. Entrants performed in English, and the competition was open to bands and solo performers. The grand final of the 1976 competition was broadcast live from the City Hall Concert Theatre by Rediffusion Television on 6 September 1976.

=== Recording career, 1977–1979 ===
Rivera's debut album, Gracie, was released by EMI (Hong Kong) in 1977. Her second album, the self-titled Gracie Rivera, followed the same year and included her recording of "The Bird and the Child", an English-language version of "L'oiseau et l'enfant", the French song that had won the Eurovision Song Contest 1977.

Gracie Rivera reached number one on the Hong Kong album chart published in the South China Morning Post on 25 September 1977, placing above Abba's Greatest Hits in the same week. "The Bird and the Child" reached number one on the newspaper's Hong Kong chart on 9 October 1977, having entered the top ten the previous month.

The album Gracie Rivera was certified a local Gold Disc at the second Hong Kong Gold Disc Award Presentation, organised by the IFPI (Hong Kong Group) in 1978. The scheme certifies local albums first released in Hong Kong separately from international repertoire. Other recipients that year included Teresa Carpio, Roman Tam and Frances Yip. In April 1978 Rivera performed "You Light Up My Life" at the Hong Kong premiere of the film of the same name.

Rivera released three further albums for EMI (Hong Kong): Grace Anne Rivera and Don't Let the Sun Catch You Crying in 1978, and We're Home Again in 1979. Grace Anne Rivera was produced by Anders Nelsson, then EMI (Hong Kong)'s artist and repertoire manager, and arranged and conducted by Chris Babida. A 1979 EMI supplement published in Billboard described Rivera as among the label's "steady sellers" in Hong Kong.

The Philippine pressing of Grace Anne Rivera, manufactured under licence by Dyna Products of Manila, included two Tagalog-language tracks that did not appear on the Singapore, Malaysian and Hong Kong pressing. Rivera wrote one song on Gracie Rivera, "Just a Dream".

=== Later performing career ===
In 1980 the Hong Kong newsmagazine Asiaweek described Rivera as a "Filipina singer-musician, who renders her Cantonese and Tagalog love songs in concert theatres and supper clubs throughout the region"; the article was reprinted by Billboard that May.

In July 1981 the Hong Kong newspaper Wah Kiu Yat Po announced that Rivera and Robert Lee (李振輝) would appear as performing guests at the fifth Hong Kong Gold Disc Award Presentation. In November 1984 the South China Morning Post reported that she was expected to perform at the Hong Kong Press Club on 7 December.

=== Stage and television ===
In 1986 Rivera took the lead role of Luz, a Filipina domestic helper, in Bingo, a comedy written and directed by Ricardo Saludo. The play was the first production staged by Tanghalanatin ("Our Theatre"), a Filipino theatre company formed in Hong Kong in November 1985 to promote Philippine culture and language. It was performed in English and Tagalog at the Space Museum Lecture Hall as part of the Hong Kong Fringe Festival. Reviewing the production for the South China Morning Post, Michael Waugh wrote that Luz was a difficult role because she had few obvious character traits, and that the part called for "more than an ordinary sort of actress"; in his view the director had found one in Rivera.

In December 1991 Rivera played the lead role of Lilia in "Lilia's Choice", an episode of the RTHK drama series City Life. Her character, a Filipina nurse, leaves the Philippines against her family's wishes to work as a domestic helper in Hong Kong.

== Discography ==
All albums released by EMI (Hong Kong) Ltd.

Studio albums
Year	Title	Catalogue number
1977	Gracie	EMGS 6012
1977	Gracie Rivera	EMGS 6022
1978	Grace Anne Rivera	EMGS 6031
1978	Don't Let the Sun Catch You Crying	EMGS 6036
1979	We're Home Again	EMGS 6050

Rivera also appeared on EMI (Hong Kong) various-artists compilations, including Hit Sounds volumes 7 and 8 and 16 Motion Picture Greats for You in 1977, and Star Hits volumes 2 and 3 in 1978. Recordings by Rivera were reissued by Universal Music Hong Kong on the eight-disc compilation EMI Hit Sounds Collection in 2021.
