= Four Golden Flowers =

- Born: British Hong Kong
- Occupation: Singer
- Years active: 1973 to late 1970s

Chinese name
- Traditional Chinese: 四朵金花
- Simplified Chinese: 四朵金花
Transcriptions
Standard Mandarin
- Hanyu Pinyin: Sì Duǒ Jīn Huā
Yue: Cantonese
- Jyutping: Sei^{3} Do^{2} Gam^{1} Faa^{1}
- Musical career
- Origin: British Hong Kong
- Genres: Cantopop, Hong Kong English pop
- Label: EMI
- Past members: Lydia Shum (沈殿霞); Liza Wang (汪明荃); Felicia Wong (王愛明); Teresa Cheung (張德蘭)

The Four Golden Flowers was a TV musical performance girl group in the 1970s. They are one of the first all-girl modern music group in Hong Kong.

The members include Lydia Shum (沈殿霞), Liza Wang (汪明荃), Felicia Wong (王愛明) and Teresa Cheung (張德蘭).

The group debuted on the TVB variety show Enjoy Yourself Tonight in early 1973 as all four members at that time were TVB artists. The group then frequently performed on the show and eventually disbanded in the late 1970s.

== Legacy ==
Many Hong Kong actresses were in this group. The Four Golden Flowers included Lydia Shum (Fei-Fei), who died on February 26, 2008, because of liver cancer. The group also included "The Big Sister" Liza Wang, who played a part in the growth of Hong Kong's entertainment industry.

== See also ==
- Music of Hong Kong
