= WATN =

WATN may refer to:

- WATN (AM), a radio station (1240 AM) licensed to Watertown, New York, United States
- WATN-TV, a television station (channel 25/PSIP 24) licensed to Memphis, Tennessee, United States

== See also ==
- Where Are They Now? (disambiguation)
