= Young men =

Young men may refer to:

- Adolescent males
- Young Men (Lebanon), a Lebanese Christian militia during the Lebanese Civil War 1978–1986
- Young Men (organization), a Mormon youth organization
- The Young Men, a 1968–1971 Hong Kong folk/rock band
- Young Men, a 1950s superhero comic published by Atlas Comics
