= Zight (disambiguation) =

Zight may refer to:

- Zight, producer and songwriter
- Zight App, video and image-sharing platform
