= Fifty Vinc =

German music producer

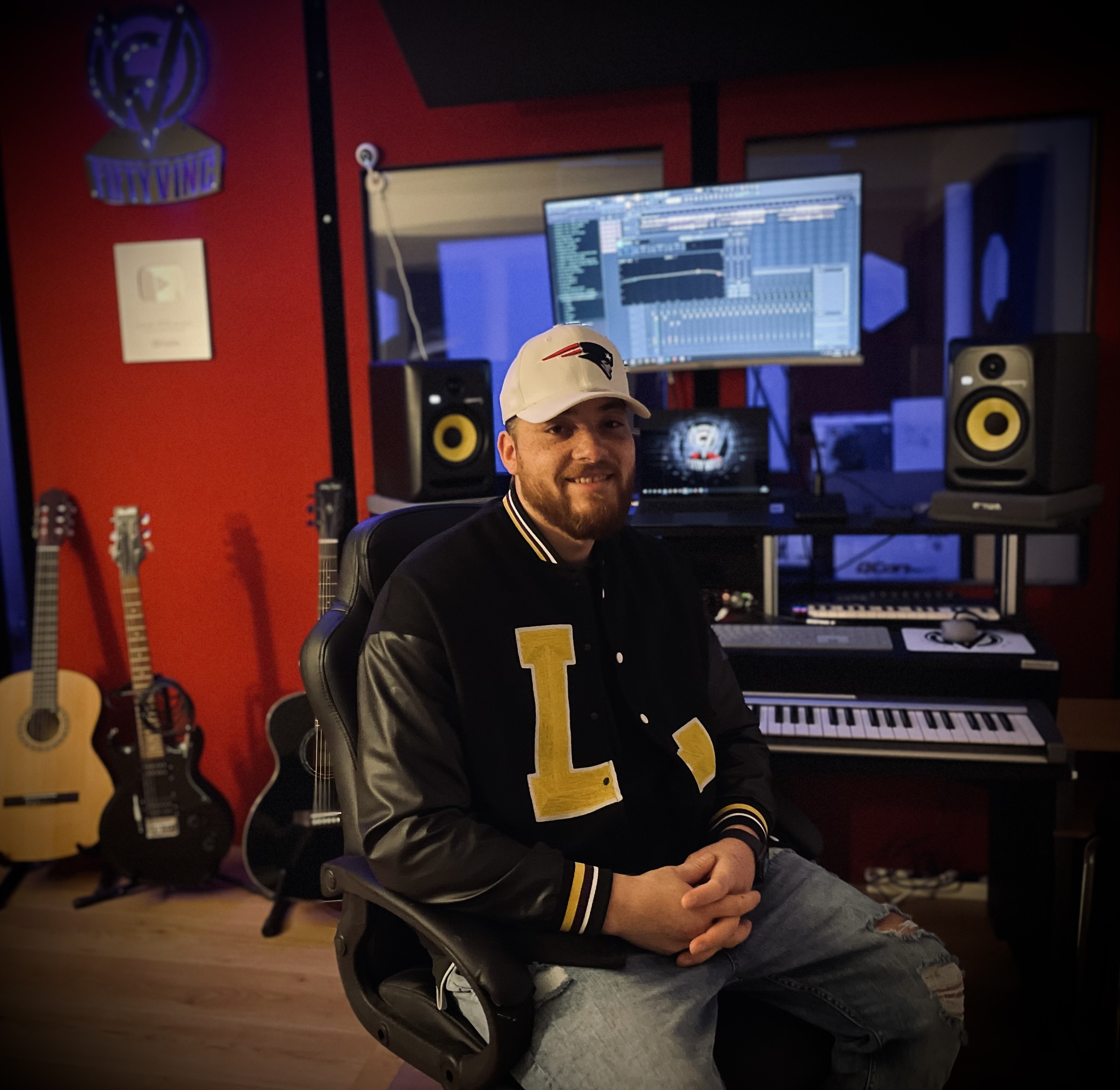
- Fifty Vinc in 2022

Background information
- Born: 9 June 1994 (age 31); Datteln, Germany
- Genres: Hip hop; film score; trailer music; production music; jazz; pop
- Occupations: Composer; music producer
- Instruments: Drums; Piano; Guitar
- Years active: 2012–present
- Labels: Sony Music Publishing; BMG Production Music; UnitedMasters; BeatStars; FIFTY VINC; FBP Music; Dominance Records; Hunchback Music; EXMGE Music; Amori Sounds
- Website: fiftyvincproductions.com

Fifty Vinc (born June 9, 1994 in Datteln, real name Vincent Jewell) is a German record producer and composer.

== Biography ==
Vinc grew up bilingual in Lüdinghausen, as his father is a native American from New Jersey. His father was a DJ in various clubs across the United States, playing genres like Hip-Hop, Funk, and RnB music.

Vinc initially attended primary school but was transferred to a special school for children with behavioral issues after the second grade. He later moved to a secondary school and subsequently attended a vocational college. In 2015, he successfully completed his specialized higher education entrance qualification.

From 2017 to 2020, Vinc completed an apprenticeship as a management assistant for forwarding and logistics services before starting his career as an independent music composer and producer.

== Music career ==
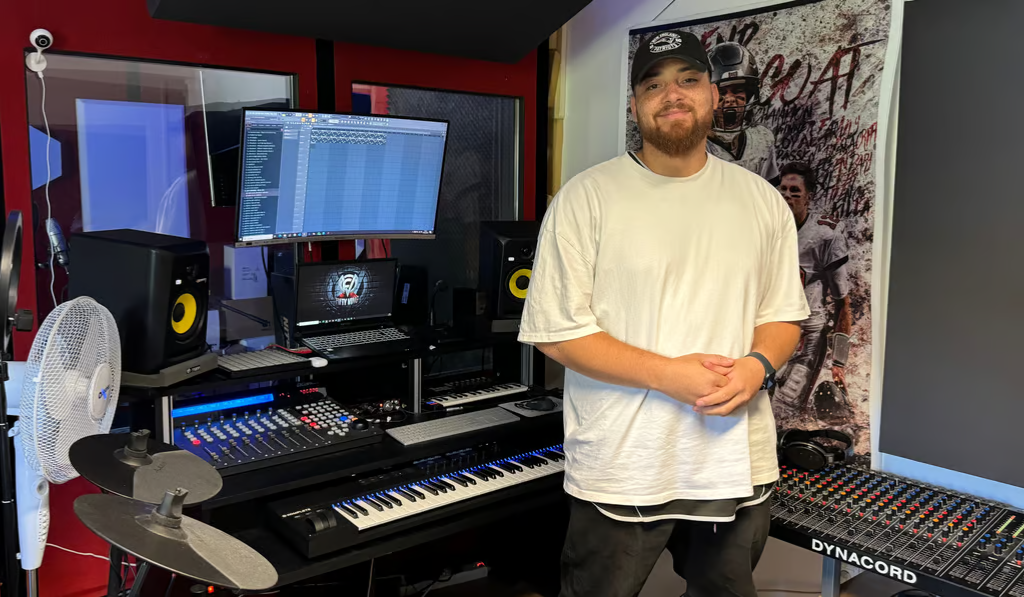
Fifty Vinc (2024)

Vinc's early hobby was Breaking, which led him to initially produce music for this scene. Later, he focused on producing in genres like Hip-Hop and Rap. Inspired by his idol Hans Zimmer and his passion for epic, cinematic, orchestral and trailer music, Vinc started blending modern Hip-Hop sounds with elements of film music. This unique style is a defining feature of his musical works.

Several of Vinc's compositions have been featured in TV productions. His works have also been used by various brands, organizations, and events.

In September 2016, the debut album Trittschall by German female rapper and actress Nina Menke was released, with Vinc contributing as a composer for the tracks Flaschenpost and Outro.

Vinc also collaborated on the soundtrack of the Brazilian short film Djorge: Da Bonja pro Mundo with Didek Beats.

Additionally, the far-right rapper Chris Ares used several of Vinc's compositions in his 2020 album Ares, which charted in Switzerland at number 44 for a week.

In 2020, the album NNicht Ohne Campf by rapper NNOC was released. On this album, Vinc composed the single Königsdisziplin featuring Liquit Walker in collaboration with Didek Beats and Milez Beats.

In 2022, the single Killer's Blood by the artist Cryptik Soul and the American rappers Swifty McVay and Kuniva was released, based on the composition Way Of The Warrior (Part 1) by Vinc. McVay and Kuniva are former members of the award-winning hip-hop crew D12, which had been signed to Shady Records, the label of successful American rapper Eminem, since 1999.

In 2020, Vinc's album Hip Hop & Rap Beats 5 reached the Top 100 Hip-Hop/Rap Albums on Greek iTunes Charts, peaking at 17.

In 2022, Vinc's singles gained attention from international music magazines and blogs like The Source and Earmilk.

On September 28, 2024, Vinc was the composer for the Flying Art Of Movement show by the Flying Steps and Red Bull, which opened the new SAP Garden in Munich.

In October 2024, Vinc released the production music album Lost Relics through BMG Production Music, designed for the film and TV industry.

For the Berlin-based dance group Team Recycled, which appeared in the 20th season of the U.S. talent show America’s Got Talent, Vinc composed several original pieces. The first work was created for the group's audition performance, in which the act stood out due to a musically accompanied movement from the main stage into the audience area. During this part of the broadcast, Vinc’s music—composed specifically for the scene—was featured and positively highlighted on air by judge Simon Cowell with the words "Music’s fantastic". Subsequently, Vinc also worked on the musical concepts for Team Recycled’s quarterfinal and final performances. The group received the Golden Buzzer from judge Howie Mandel in the quarterfinals, which granted them direct entry into the final of the season. The compositions used were specifically tailored to the choreography, lighting design, and cinematic staging of the performances. All pieces were created as original compositions and formed an integral part of the dance group’s acts as broadcast on U.S. television and via streaming. Vinc was thus involved as a composer and music producer in multiple appearances by Team Recycled on the show.

Vinc is an official Power User of the Digital Audio Workstation (DAW) FL Studio as well as composer and sound designer for Amori Sounds, a Hip-Hop production music company and publisher from the Bronx, New York.

Most of Vinc's works are managed and published by the music publishers Beatstars Publishing Worldwide and Sony Music Publishing.

== Discography ==
=== Albums ===
Year	Album / EP
2017	Hard Rap Beats & Hip Hop Instrumentals
2017	Hip Hop & Rap Beats Part I (Hip Hop Instrumentals)
2017	Hip Hop & Rap Beats Part II (Hip Hop Instrumentals)
2018	Brand New Rap Beats & Hard Hip Hop Instrumentals
2019	Hip Hop & Rap Beats 3 (Rap Instrumentals)
2019	Hip Hop & Rap Beats 4 (Rap Instrumentals)
2020	Hip Hop & Rap Beats 5
2021	Born Epic
2023	Kingdom
2024	Beast Mode
2024	Realm Of The Fallen
2024	Lost Relics
2025	Victory Mode

=== Singles ===
Year	Title	Collaboration (Artist)	Co-Producer / Co-Composer	Notes
2016	Sweet Dreams (BBoy Mix)			Appears on Battle Of The Year 2016 - The Soundtrack by Battle Of The Year
2017	Believe To Battle Me	Jay	Jay	Appears on Battle Of The Year 2017 - The Soundtrack by Battle Of The Year
2018	Golden Era	Sadikbeatz	Sadik Kalyon	
2021	Verdansk	Sadikbeatz	Sadik Kalyon	
2021	Brass Of War			Appears on Battle Of The Year 2021 - The Soundtrack by Battle Of The Year
2021	Darkside			Available in the UnitedMasters Library
2022	Secret Mission			
2022	Different People			Available in the UnitedMasters Library
2022	Work It Out	Didker, Agf.Israel	Adrian Diduch	Available in the UnitedMasters Library
2022	We Gonna Make It	Julian Rübner, Dogman Rukus	Julian Rübner	Available in the UnitedMasters Library
2022	Jazz Do It			
2022	Look Out			Released under the label Epic Electronic
2022	Halloween Nightmare			Released under the label FBP Music Publishing / Fueled By Passion
2022	Bboys Legacy			Appears on Battle Of The Year 2022 - The Soundtrack by Battle Of The Year
2022	Winner	Amori Sounds		Appears on the album 432 Hz by Amori Sounds
2022	Blade Of The Fighter	Amori Sounds		Appears on the album 432 Hz by Amori Sounds
2022	Spirit Of The Jungle	Amori Sounds		Appears on the album Trailers by Amori Sounds
2023	Anti-Hero	JordanBeats	Michael Jordan	
2023	The Conquest	Sadikbeatz	Sadik Kalyon	
2023	The Revenge			Appears on the album Epic Adventures - Volume III by Hunchback Music
2023	Undefeated Champion			
2023	Vanguard	Didker	Adrian Diduch	Available in the UnitedMasters Library
2023	Runnin'	Alex Hamilton		Available in the UnitedMasters Library
2023	Symphony Of Victory			Available in the UnitedMasters Library
2023	Breakthrough	Didker	Adrian Diduch	
2023	Modern Warfare			Available in the UnitedMasters Library
2023	Gameday			Available in the UnitedMasters Library
2023	Fly Like The Wind	Mondel Moore, Angelina		Available in the UnitedMasters Library
2023	Boombox Memories	Mr.Goodbarz		Available in the UnitedMasters Library
2023	Hephaestus	Didker	Adrian Diduch	Available in the UnitedMasters Library
2024	Gameday (Remix)	Agf.Israel		Available in the UnitedMasters Library
2024	Our Moment	Alex Hamilton, Agf.Israel		Available in the UnitedMasters Library
2024	Teardown	Eclipse Beats	Ingo Metz	Available in the UnitedMasters Library
2024	Apollo	Didker	Adrian Diduch	Available in the UnitedMasters Library
2024	Rise and Shine	Alex Hamilton		Available in the UnitedMasters Library
2024	Hold It Down	Chase Paves		The Upstate Sound Music Group - Sync Placement
2024	Rise to the Top	Trailermind, Agf.Israel, Alex Hamilton	Anton Volobrinskiy	Available in the UnitedMasters Library
2024	Wait A Minute	YB The Prophet	Yoosuf Qaadir Blake	Available in the UnitedMasters Library
2024	Greatness	Didker	Adrian Diduch	
2024	To The Max	Rich Wrotes		
2024	Enter The Ring			Available in the UnitedMasters Library
2024	Number One	Chase Paves		Available in the UnitedMasters Library
2025	Vamos			Appears in WPGM Article
2025	Final Push			
