= Betty Chung =

Hong Kong singer

- Born: Chung Chiu-mei 鍾昭薇 (Traditional) 钟昭薇 (Simplified); Zhōng Zhāowēi (Mandarin); Zung1 Ciu1 Mei4 (Cantonese); 1947 (age 77–78); Hong Kong
- Occupation(s): Singer, actress
- Years active: 1963–1984
- Spouse: Chris Babida (divorced)

Chinese name
- Traditional Chinese: 鍾玲玲
- Simplified Chinese: 钟玲玲
Transcriptions
Standard Mandarin
- Hanyu Pinyin: Zhōng Línglíng
Yue: Cantonese
- Jyutping: Zung1 Ling4 Ling4
- Musical career
- Origin: Hong Kong
- Labels: EMI

Betty Chung (born 1947) is a former Hong Kong recording artist and actress popular during the 1960s and 1970s. She sings in English, Mandarin and Cantonese.

== Life and career ==
Betty Chung was born in Hong Kong. Her ancestral hometown is Chengdu (成都市), Sichuan Province. In 1963, she won a singing contest at the age of 16. She appeared in various TV commercials, TVB shows, and movies, including Enter the Dragon. Chung left Hong Kong showbiz in the 1980s. She married famous songwriter Chris Babida (Chinese: 鮑比達) but then divorced. She has one son and resides in Southern California.

== Filmography ==
- 1965: Xiao yun que
- 1968: Hong luan xing dong as Nightclub singer (Guest star)
- 1969: Diao jin gui
- 1969: Qing chun wan sui
- 1970: Huan le ren sheng
- 1970: Hen xin di ren
- 1973: She wang yu yan wang
- 1973: Enter the Dragon (龍爭虎鬥) as Mei Ling
- 1975: All Men Are Brothers (蕩寇誌) as Li Shih-shih (final film role)

== Discography ==
- 1966: 《A Go Go》
- 1967: 《愛情鐘 Bell A Go Go》
- 1967: 《假惺惺 Let's Pretend》
- 1968: 《紅鸞星動》OST
- 1968: 《I Want Action》
- 1968: 《迷你，迷你 Mini Mini》
- 1968: 《野火 Wild Flame》
- 1969: 《聖誕快樂 Merry Christmas》
- 1969: 《我祝福他 Massachusetts》
- 1969: 《桃李春風 Dark Semester》OST
- 1969: 《春火 My Son》OST
- 1969: 《慾燄狂流 Torrent of Desire》OST
- 1970: 《情感的債 One Day》
- 1970: 《浪子之歌 The Lark》
- 1970: 《蝴蝶飛 The Butterfly》
- 1970: 《迷你小姐 Mini-Midi-Maxi Girl》
- 1971: 《愛情故事 Love Story》
- 1974: 《Betty Chung》
- 1976: 《Peter Pan 小飛俠》Hong Kong version OST
- 1977: 《心有千千結》OST
- 1977: 《大家姐與大狂魔》電影原聲帶 (好市唱片)
- 2005: 《百代百年系列7：西洋風（一）大江東去》

== TV appearances ==
- Enjoy Yourself Tonight 歡樂今宵 (TVB)
- 1st Hong Kong Gold Disc Award Presentation 第一屆香港金唱片頒獎典禮 1977 (TVB)
- Miss Hong Kong Pageant 1977 (1977年度香港小姐競選) (TVB)
- Where Are They Now? (TVB) 2006 (TVB)
