= English pop =

English pop may mean or refer to:

- pop music in the English language
- Britpop, the British alternative rock genre
- Hong Kong English pop, the genre including English music from US, UK and Hong Kong
