= Kevin Sinclair =

Kevin Sinclair may refer to:

- Kevin Sinclair (journalist) (1942–2007), New Zealand journalist and author
- Kevin Sinclair (cricketer) (born 1999), Guyanese cricketer
