= Fang Wen =

Fang Wen may refer to the following people:

- Fang Wen (poet) (方文), a poet of the Ming and Qing dynasties
- Astor Fong (方文), a Hong Kong singer-songwriter
- Wen Fong (方聞), a Chinese-American historian of East Asian art
