= Pop music in Hong Kong =

Pop music in Hong Kong may refer to:

- Cantopop music in Hong Kong
- Mandopop music in Hong Kong
- Hong Kong English pop music
