= Roman Tam =

Hong Kong singer (1945–2002)

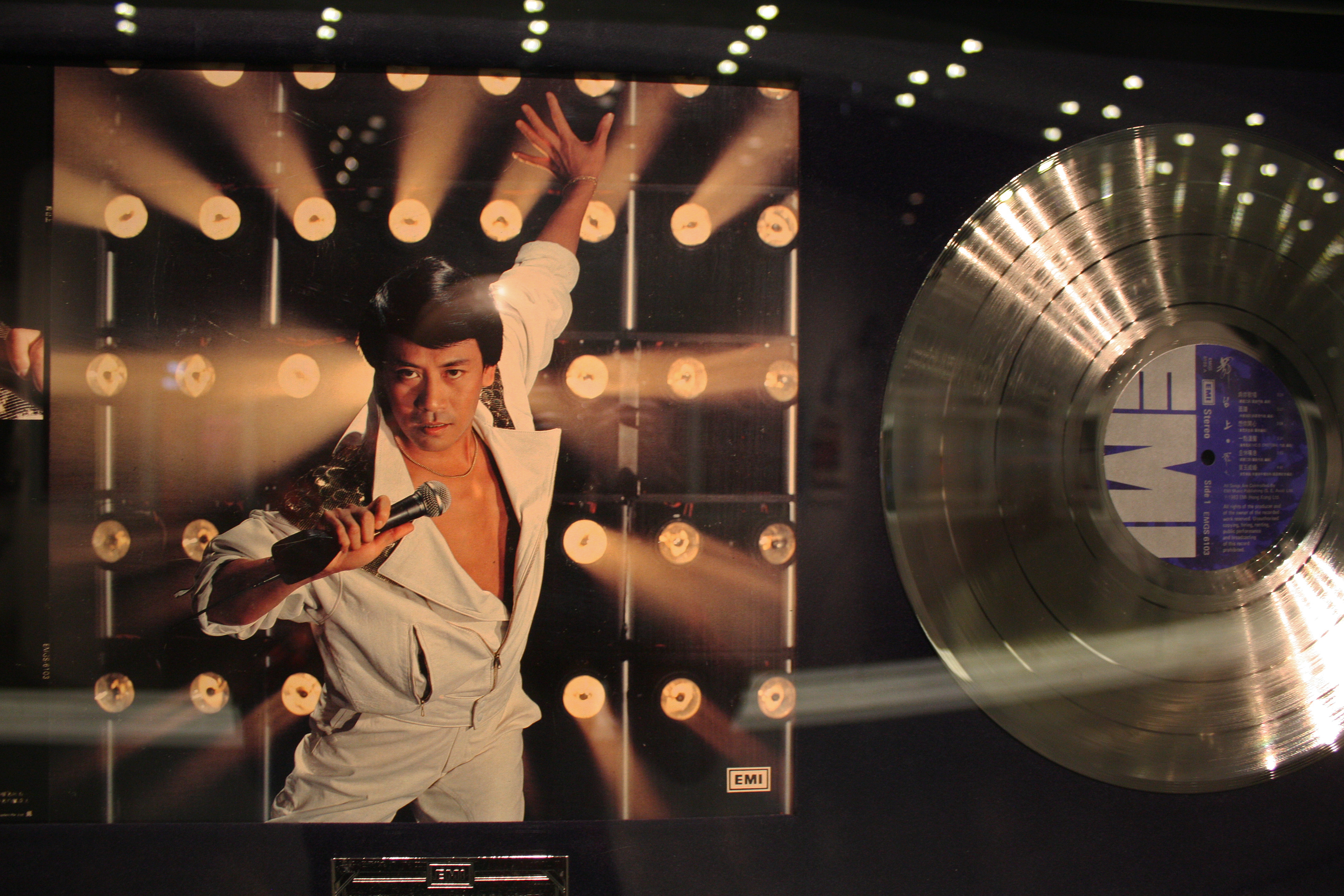
- Tam album on display at the Hong Kong Heritage Museum's exhibit
- Born: Tam Pak-sin (譚百先); 12 February 1945; Baise, Guangxi, China
- Died: 18 October 2002 (aged 57); Queen Mary Hospital, Pok Fu Lam, Hong Kong
- Occupation: Singer
- Years active: 1960s–2002
- Awards: RTHK Top 10 Gold Songs Awards; 1991 RTHK Golden Needle Award

Chinese name
- Traditional Chinese: 羅文
- Simplified Chinese: 罗文
Transcriptions
Standard Mandarin
- Hanyu Pinyin: Luó Wén
Yue: Cantonese
- Jyutping: Lo4 Man4
- Musical career
- Also known as: Law Kee (羅記); Saint of Singing (歌聖)
- Genres: Cantopop; Hong Kong English pop
- Instrument: Vocals
- Labels: EMI; BMG; EEG

Roman Tam Pak-sin (Chinese: 譚百先; Jyutping: taam4 baak3 sin1; 12 February 1945 – 18 October 2002), known professionally by his stage name Law Man (羅文; lo4 man4), was a Hong Kong singer. He is regarded as the "Grand Godfather of Cantopop".

== Early life ==
Born in Baise, Guangxi, China, with family roots in Guiping, Guangxi, he moved to Guangzhou (Canton) in 1947 at the age of two. He later emigrated to Hong Kong in 1962 at the age of 17 because his mother fell ill and was only able to get better medical treatment in Hong Kong. He was poor and was only able to sleep with a sleeping bag and a radio on the floor of a banking building. His musical interests started from listening to the radio.

== Career ==
Tam worked odd jobs to survive as his parents died early. He had worked at a tailor's, an amusement park and a bank and performed at bars with a band called TNT. Tam would perform using the stage name Law Man (羅文; lo4 man4), a transliteration of his English name, Roman.

In 1968, Tam formed a band, Roman and the Four Steps, with four of his friends from the bank. Inspired by The Beatles, the band performed American and British songs but disbanded in 1971. Tam continued on a solo career.

In 1970, Lydia Shum, then a host and performer on the popular variety show Enjoy Yourself Tonight (EYT), saw Tam perform at a bar and invited him to be a guest at EYT. They became a singing duet initially called Lella & Roman but formally formed the duet as Couple Chorus (情侣合唱团) in 1971. While performing, both wore matching outfits but denied they were a couple. The duet travelled to the United States and Southeast Asia for performances, mainly singing Chinese and English popular songs. They also launched an album, Lydia Sum Roman Tam NO.1 (沈殿霞 羅文 NO.1), with eight duets and two individual songs each.

In 1974, Tam moved to Japan after signing a two-year contract with a top Japanese recording manager. While in Japan, Tam improved his music production skills and showmanship. After his contract was over, Tam returned to Hong Kong, citing unhappiness and the strict control as a Japanese artist.

Tam later became a contract singer under studios term at TVB. He briefly switched to Asia Television in the early 1990s.

During the 1990s, he accepted many budding singers as his students. Some of whom that became famous included Shirley Kwan, Joey Yung and Ekin Cheng. He had sung many well-known solos and duets for various TV series including the song Below the Lion Rock for the show Below the Lion Rock, and the famous 1983 TVB TV series The Legend of the Condor Heroes main theme duet with Jenny Tseng.

Tam officially retired in 1996 with 56 albums to his name. Tam would continued to perform occasionally with other artists.

== Style ==
Tam was also known for bending and breaking gender norms, with a "flamboyant" on-stage persona. He was the first Hong Kong pop star to perform in drag and was featured in a magazine while posing in the nude. Although the latter was controversial at the time, Tam "'got away with his on-stage flamboyance because of his off-stage discretion' and was accepted 'in mainstream Chinese culture at a time when homosexuality was outlawed'". He never married and maintained a high degree of privacy in his personal life.

== Death ==
On 19 October 2002, Tam died in Hong Kong at Queen Mary Hospital from liver cancer at the age of 57. Secretary for Home Affairs Patrick Ho expressed his condolences.

Awards and achievements
Preceded by Wong Jim	Golden Needle Award of RTHK Top Ten Chinese Gold Songs Award; 1991	Succeeded by Leslie Cheung
