= Teresa Cheung Tak-lan =

Hong Kong singer (born 1959)

- Born: 10 November 1959 (age 67); British Hong Kong
- Other name: Cheung Yuen-yuen (張圓圓)
- Occupation: Singer
- Years active: 1966-1980s
- Spouse: Frankie Yeung (m. 1988)
- Musical career
- Origin: Hong Kong
- Genre: Cantopop
- Instrument: Voice
- Formerly of: Four Golden Flowers

Chinese name
- Traditional Chinese: 張德蘭
- Simplified Chinese: 张德兰
Transcriptions
Standard Mandarin
- Hanyu Pinyin: zhang1 de2 lan2
Yue: Cantonese
- Jyutping: zoeng1 dak1 laan4

Teresa Cheung Tak-lan (born 10 November 1959) is a Hong Kong singer, actress, and Chinese medicine practitioner.

== Background ==
She participated in the entertainment industry since she was a child, using his original name Cheung Yuen-yuen 張圓圓, and was a member of the Four Golden Flowers.

In 1980, she represented Hong Kong at the Pacific Song Contest, held in Ottawa, Canada, with the song "Forsaken Love", placing in the bottom four of eight entries.

She rose to fame in Hong Kong through the 1980s on the back of a song that she sang for the TVB series The Good, The Bad And The Ugly. She also sang the main theme for the TV series The Return of the Condor Heroes (1983) and three of its subthemes. Additionally, the main theme songs for the TV series Princess Cheung Ping (1981) and Blood-Stained Intrigue (1986) were sung by her as well.

== Personal life ==
In 1988, she married business director and arts administrator Frankie Yeung. She is also a Catholic.

After retirement, she started studying Chinese medicine at the Hong Kong Baptist University in 1997 and became a registered practitioner in 2002.

== Discography ==
=== Drama Soundtracks ===
Year	Drama Title	Song title	Notes
1986	Blood-Stained Intrigue (神劍魔刀)	Hak Baak Naan Bin (黑白難辨)	Drama Theme Song
1985	To Each It Sown (錯體姻緣)	Ngoi Cing OK Gaau (愛情OK膠)	Drama Theme Song
1983	The Return of the Condor Heroes (神鵰俠侶)	Ho Yat Tsoi Seung Kin (何日再相見)	Drama Theme Song
1983	The Return of the Condor Heroes (神鵰俠侶)	Ching Yi Leung Sum Kin (情義兩心堅)	Sub Theme Song
1983	The Return of the Condor Heroes (神鵰俠侶)	Man Sai Kan (問世間)	Sub Theme Song
1983	The Return of the Condor Heroes (神鵰俠侶)	Lau Chyu Gam Yat Ching (留住今日情)	Sub Theme Song
1981	Princess Cheung Ping (武俠帝女花)	武俠帝女花 (Princess Cheung Ping)	Drama Theme Song
1979	The Good, the Bad and the Ugly (網中人)	網中人 (The Good, the Bad and the Ugly)	Drama Theme Song
