= Astor Fong =

Musical Artist and Entrepreneur

- Born: 3 March; Hong Kong
- Education: University of Salford; Berklee College of Music
- Occupations: Singer-songwriter; Record producer Columnist; Music program presenter Music tutor Celebrity manager Entrepreneur
- Years active: 2008–present

Chinese name
- Traditional Chinese: 方文
- Simplified Chinese: 方文
Transcriptions
- Musical career
- Also known as: 方汶
- Origin: Hong Kong
- Genres: Cantopop; Mandopop; Adult contemporary Easy listening Smooth jazz Hong Kong English pop
- Instrument: Vocals
- Website: Astor Fong Official Website & Blog

Astor Fong (Chinese: 方文) is a Chinese singer-songwriter, recording artist, record producer, columnist, music program presenter, music tutor, celebrity manager and entrepreneur from Hong Kong, she sings in English, Mandarin Chinese and Cantonese. Several of her solo albums have charted in Hong Kong and Asia. Astor gained widely acclaim for her similarity to Karen Carpenter's vocal style. Astor was dubbed the "Karen Carpenter of Asia". She is a lyric contralto with a wide vocal range that spanned about three octaves. Astor sang all of the Carpenters' songs during her concert in 2013 using the same key as Karen Carpenter which are rare in female artists in Asia. Among all other record singers in Hong Kong, Astor has recorded a lot of Broadway musical songs that has highly acclaimed in 2011. As Astor has a good track record in both English and Chinese albums, she was dubbed "Audiophile Diva" by leading audiophile magazine in 2015. Astor is also the first female celebrity columnist of "Audiophile", one of the famous audiophile magazine in Hong Kong.

== Biography ==
Astor Fong is a third-generation Malaysian Chinese. She graduated from the University of Salford in the United Kingdom, majoring in psychology. She also completed courses in vocal music and music therapy at the Berklee College of Music in the United States, and studied drama under Olivia Yan and Jim Chim.

Astor entered a number of singing competitions. She has won numerous music awards including the championship in the California Red & BMG Hong Kong Singing Contest and also the 9th Hong Kong CASH Song Writers Quest. Other participants in the same competition included popular singers such as Raymond Cho, Peter Cheung, Wilfred Lau, Paisley Hu, and Susan Wong.

Astor albums are released by Universal Music and several local record labels.

She is most known as a former member of the pop band "T.J.T. (天織堂)".She sang the theme song of the broadcast drama by Commercial Radio Hong Kong. Astor songs entered the pop charts that won the CRHK Ultimate Song Chart Awards Presentation Most Popular New Group Bronze Award for the year 1995 as well as TVB Jade Solid Gold Best Ten Music Awards Presentation Most Popular Singer-Songwriter Bronze Award in 1996.

Astor released her solo debut "ASTOR (ERSTE)" in 2008 by Add Music which covers of popular western songs, including "When I Dream", the theme song of the Asian film "Dragon Squad" which is the first Chinese film in the world to be included in the National Museum of the People's Republic of China as one of the top class collection items. Astor's talent was discovered again by the Japanese records S2S. The same name album "Erste" launched in Asia received critical acclaim.

In 2009 by record producer Keith Yip appreciation, Astor joined Rock in Music and is released another album "forever young. forever love", immediately hailed as a new generation of Hi-Fi Diva in Asia.

"Close To You (情真．遊戲．Close To You)" is her first original Cantonese album, a collaboration with top producers and musicians in Asia such as Ricky Fung, Jolland Chan, Sam Hui, Goh Kheng Long and Terence Teo, etc.

Behind the scenes, Astor is also good at photography and design. She has served as image design and music production. As Hong Kong Post recognized designer, she was invited to design theme stamps. She was subsequently appointed as the record producer, concert producer as well as singing lecturer frequently. She also has participated in the movie music of "Beast Stalker" and "The Sniper".

On 20 October 2013, Astor Fong and Dominic Chow appeared at the Star Hall, Kowloonbay International Trade & Exhibition Centre (KITEC) for "Carpenters Once More" – "In Loving Memory Of Karen On Her 30th Year of Passing", Hong Kong's first live big concert tribute to Karen Carpenter. "Karen Carpenter of Asia" travels fast as well. On the same day, Astor released her 5th album "Eyes of the Night (夜的眼睛)".

On 23 November 2013, Astor was invited to perform and to have signing session at Singapore International Sound and Sight Exhibition (ISSE) 2013.

In 2014, Astor Fong, recognized as Asia's Karen Carpenter, was invited to perform and also to have signing session at Plenary Theatre, Kuala Lumpur Convention Centre (KLCC) for "I Am Hi-Fi Singer Live Showcase" in Malaysia.

In 2015, after the invitation of the Shenzhen autograph session, Astor has been invited and appointed by the leading Hi-Fi magazine "Audiophile" as a celebrity columnist. She is the first female celebrity columnist in audiophile categories in Hong Kong.

In 2017, she released two MQ Gold CDs, "forever young ‧ forever love" and "Theatre".

In 2018, Astor was granted the opportunity to record the iconic Carpenters song "I Need to Be in Love" at the famous Abbey Road Studios in London, becoming the first Asian audiophile singer to record at the studio.

In 2022, Astor hosted a music program and launched two themed specials "Sing with Astor" with friends from the music industry, including Jacqueline Man Pui-Ling, Joyce Lee, Clayton Cheung, Patrick Dunn, Orlando To Tak-Chi, Rita Carpio, Donald Cheung Wai Man, Cherrie Choi, Au Yeung Tak Fan, Peric Lee. She also became the spokesperson for the flagship earphone "ACE Dual" in the Greater China region for Aroma Audio.

In October 2023, Astor was invited to attend the "Ho Fung Environmental Education & Hong Kong Parrot Rescue Conservation Association" and "Yat Bun Durian King" joint charity fundraising private party, which was attended by celebrities such as Sharon Kwok Sau-Wan and Stanley Pong-Kit, Ted Lui, the chief planner of Ho Fung environmental education activities, Feng Shui master Simon Wong, vegan fitness expert Man Ho-Tin, music artist Ukulelist Eddie Chu, Johnny Lau, Alex Lau from Black Box, Johnny Fong from D'Spectacles, and the group singers from "Midlife, Sing & Shine!" (Roy Tang, Ada Lui, and Samuel Hui). Astor served as MC for the entire evening and performed acoustic duets with various musicians, singing multiple classic Chinese and English songs.

== Discography ==
- "ASTOR (ERSTE)" (Hong Kong edition), Add Music, 2008.
- "Erste" (Asia edition), S2S, 2009.
- "forever young．forever love", Rock in Music, 2009.
- "Theatre", Rock in Music, 2011.
- "Close To You (情真．遊戲．Close To You)", New Century Workshop, 2013.
- "ASTOR (ERSTE)" (K2HD version), Universal Music, 2013.
- "Eyes of the Night (夜的眼睛)", Universal Music, 2013.
- "ASTOR (ERSTE)" (relaunched exclusively by CD-Rama, South East Asia), Universal Music, 2014.
- "Astor Sings Jolland (情．懷)", Add Music, 2015.
- "Astor Sings Jolland (情．懷)" (SACD, LP version), Add Music, 2016.
- "Erste", (24 bit CD Asia edition) EQ Music, 2016.
- "Eyes of the Night (夜的眼睛)" (Singapore & Malaysia version), EQ Music, 2017.
- "forever young．forever love"(MQ Gold CD version), Rock in Music, 2017.
- "Theatre"(MQ Gold CD version), Rock in Music, 2017.
- "Astor Sings Anita Mui (情歸有心人)", Add Music, 2017.
