= Roman and the Four Steps =

- Born: Hong Kong
- Years active: 1967 – 1971

Chinese name
- Traditional Chinese: 羅文四步合唱團
- Simplified Chinese: 罗文四步合唱团
Transcriptions
Standard Mandarin
- Hanyu Pinyin: luó wén sǐ bú hé chāng tuán
Yue: Cantonese
- Jyutping: lo4 man4 sei3 bou6 hap6 coeng3 tyun4
- Musical career
- Origin: Hong Kong
- Genres: Hong Kong English pop
- Members: Roman Tam (Lead singer); George Fung (Guitar); Danny So (Keyboard); Willy Han (Bass); Vinton Fung (drums)

Roman and the Four Steps was a popular band in Hong Kong in the 1960s. Roman formed the band drawing inspirations from The Beatles.

== Career ==
The band was noteworthy for singing in English and often singing British and American songs. Roman Tam would eventually leave the band and enter the cantopop genre solo where he would eventually be labelled the "Godfather of Cantopop" after his death.

== Discography ==
- Reflections of Charlie Brown b/w I Just Can't Wait (1967)
- Day Dream b/w Cathy Come Home (1969)
