= 1991 RTHK Top 10 Gold Songs Awards =

1991 edition of a Hong Kong music award

The 1991 RTHK Top 10 Gold Songs Awards (Chinese: 第十四屆十大中文金曲頒獎音樂會) was held in 1992 for the 1991 music season.

== Top 10 song awards ==
The top 10 songs (十大中文金曲) of 1991 are as follows.

| Song name in Chinese | Artist | Composer | Lyricist |
|---|---|---|---|
| 愛上一個不回家的人 | Sandy Lam | Chen Chih-yuan (陳志遠) | Ting Hiu-man (丁曉雯) |
| 每天愛妳多一些 | Jacky Cheung | Keisuke Kuwata | Richard Lam |
| 秋去秋來 | Sally Yeh | Hung Mei-ling (熊美玲) | Richard Lam |
| 對不起我愛妳 | Leon Lai | Antonio Arevalo Jr. (盧東尼) | Hoeng Syut-waai (向雪懷) |
| 一起走過的日子 | Andy Lau | William Hu (胡偉立) | Siu mei (小美) |
| 信自己 | Sally Yeh Alex To | J.Harris T.Lewis | Richard Lam |
| Amani | Beyond | Wong Ka Kui | Wong Ka Kui |
| Lonely | Grasshopper | Gorō Matsui 中崎英也 | Poon Wai Yuen (潘偉源) |
| 一顆不變心 | Jacky Cheung | Huang Pin Yuan (黃品源) | Gan ning (簡寧) |
| 愛不完 | Andy Lau | Andrew Tuason | Richard Lam |

== Other awards ==
| Award | Song or album (if available) | Recipient |
|---|---|---|
| Best commercial song award (最佳中文廣告歌曲獎) | – | (gold) Andrew Tuason, Calvin Poon Yuen Leung (潘源良) (silver) Romeo Diaz, Lau Dak-wing (劉德榮), Wong Gwok-jiu (黃國耀) (bronze): Anthony Lun, Thomas Chow (周禮茂) |
| Best karaoke song award (最愛歡迎卡拉ok歌曲獎) | 一起走過的日子 | Andy Lau |
| Best new prospect award (最有前途新人獎) | – | (gold) Aaron Kwok (silver) Canti Lau (bronze) Stephanie Lai (黎明詩) (Exceptional award) Shirley Yuen Fung Ying (袁鳳瑛), Elizabeth Lee, K.C. Lee (李國祥) |
| Best record producer award (最佳唱片監製獎) | 皇后大道東 (Queen's Road East) | Lo Ta-yu |
| Best musical arrangements (最佳編曲獎) | 頂天立地 | Tai Chi |
| Best record design award (最佳唱片封套設計獎) | Lonely | Joel Chu (朱祖兒) |
| Sales award (全年銷量冠軍大獎) | 是愛是緣 | Leon Lai |
| Diamond idol (鑽石偶像大獎) | – | Anita Mui |
| Outstanding mandarin song award (優秀國語歌曲獎) | 愛上一個不回家的人 | Sandy Lam |
| RTHK Golden needle award (金針獎) | – | Roman Tam |
