= Where Are They Now? =

Where Are They Now? may refer to:

== Music ==
- "Where Are They Now", a song by Cock Sparrer, 1982
- "Where Are They Now?", a song by The Kinks from Preservation Act 1, 1973
- "Where Are They Now", a song by Nas from Hip Hop Is Dead, 2006

== Television and film ==
- Oprah: Where Are They Now?, an American reality television series presented by Oprah Winfrey
- Where Are They Now? (American TV series), a music documentary show
- Where Are They Now? (Australian TV program), a pop culture documentary show
- Where Are They Now? (TVB), a Hong Kong talk show
- Where Are They Now?: A Delta Alumni Update, a 2003 mockumentary film by John Landis
