= Lydia Shum =

Hong Kong–Canadian comedian and actress (1945–2008)

- 沈殿霞
- Portrait of Shum
- Born: Lydia Sum Din-ha; 21 July 1945; Baoshan, Shanghai, China
- Died: 19 February 2008 (aged 62); Queen Mary Hospital, Pok Fu Lam, Hong Kong
- Burial place: Forest Lawn Memorial Park, Burnaby
- Other names: Lydia Tin Ha Sum, Fei-fei (肥肥); Happy Fruit or Happy Nut (開心果); Sister Fei (肥姐)
- Education: Shanghai No. 3 Girls' High School
- Occupations: Comedian; MC; actress; singer
- Years active: 1960–2008
- Spouse: Adam Cheng Siu-chow (m. 1985; div. 1988)
- Children: Joyce Cheng Yan-yee (daughter)
- Family: Alfred Sung (brother)
- Musical career
- Origin: Hong Kong
- Genre: Cantopop
- Formerly of: Four Golden Flowers

Lydia Shum Din-ha or Lydia Sum Tin-ha (Chinese: 沈殿霞; 21 July 1945 – 19 February 2008) was a Hong Kong–Canadian comedian, MC, actress and singer. Known for her portly figure, signature dark-rimmed glasses and bouffant hairstyle, she was affectionately known to peers and fans as Fei-fei (肥肥, lit. "Fat Fat" or "Fatty") or Fei Jie (肥姐 lit. "Fat Sister").

== Early life ==
Shum was born on 21 July 1945 in Baoshan, Shanghai to Shum Yin-gee (沈賢祺; 1913–1978, with her ancestral home in Shanpei, Ningbo) and Shum Yao Tam-suh (沈邱淡素; 1913–2008).

== Career ==
Shum entered the Hong Kong entertainment industry at the age of 13 in 1958. She made her film debut in 1960, joining Shaw Brothers as an actress at the age of 15. Shum debuted in When the Peach Blossoms Bloom, a 1960 Mandarin comedy directed by Griffin Yueh Feng. She took some time to adjust to Hong Kong as she found the local Cantonese cuisine very different from that of her native Shanghai.

=== TVB ===
Shum's last public appearance reuniting with the cast of Enjoy Yourself Tonight

While she worked at Shaw Brothers, her popularity grew and she became one of the first stakeholders in the up-and-coming television broadcast station TVB. In 1967, Shum's stardom took off with the popular variety show Enjoy Yourself Tonight. She first sang in the Cantopop group, the Four Golden Flowers. Later, she played a Shanghai woman in the 1970s. She also sang as the partner of Roman Tam from 1971 to 1973.

By August 1972, she was sufficiently well regarded to be invited to ceremonially ride through the Cross-Harbour Tunnel on its opening day. TVB General Manager Stephen Chan has said that there was no substitute for Lydia Shum, and that every person who worked with her professionally eventually became well known in Hong Kong. Her openness to appearing in sport bikinis and ballet costumes despite her size earned her respect in image-conscious Hong Kong.

=== Film ===
Shum has been established mainly as a comic and dramatic actress but is not limited to films in those genres. Kung fu fans will recognize her from her role as Yuen Cheung-yan's dominating wife in the film Drunken Tai Chi. She also appeared as Richard Ng's wife in the all-star comedy Millionaire's Express, as well as a major role in the successful four movie series It's a Mad, Mad, Mad World. Her 1997 film Fitness Tour utilised her weight for its plot.

She took a leave from her movie career that same year, and hosted a talk show on Hong Kong, along with numerous telethons and variety shows on TVB.

In 1976, Shum co-directed You Are Wonderful. Shum's last film was In-Laws Outlaws, a 2004 Cantonese comedy film directed by Clifton Ko Chi-sum. Shum is credited with over 175 films.

=== Abroad ===
Shum starred in Singapore's Channel 5 sitcom Living with Lydia (while credited as Lydia Sum) and Cantonese series like Slim Chances (我要Fit一Fit). Her performance in Living with Lydia won her the "Best Comedy Performance by an Actress" award at the 2003 Asian Television Awards. It was also the first time she had acted in an English sitcom with a multi-camera format, though a laugh track was used.

== Personal life ==
Lydia Shum was the sister of fashion designer Alfred Sung. Shum married actor and singer Adam Cheng Siu-chow in January 1985 after 11 years of cohabitation. Prior to the marriage, in November 1984 Shum was asked by her good friend Lee Heung Kam to fly to San Francisco for the opening ceremony of Lee's shop. Shum, who was in Taiwan with Cheng at the time, was reluctant to do so initially, but three days later, Shum left for San Francisco. When she returned to Taiwan, she heard rumors that Cheng was having an affair. Upon being asked about this, Cheng denied having a relationship with another woman and suggested marriage. Shum believed that a marriage would deter any woman from becoming close to Cheng. On 5 January 1985, Cheng and Shum flew to Vancouver, British Columbia, Canada to get married.

Due to the hurried circumstances of their marriage and Shum's proportions being outside standard clothing sizes, there was insufficient time to prepare a wedding gown. Shum wore a Chinese cheongsam instead, and later said in a 2006 interview in Hong Kong that one of her greatest regrets was not wearing a wedding gown for her wedding.

On 30 May 1987, Joyce Cheng Yan-yee was born to Shum and Adam Cheng Siu-chau. Eight months after their daughter was born, Cheng and Shum divorced.

=== Health problems and subsequent death ===
Shum had several serious chronic ailments: cholangitis, diabetes, and hypertension. In 2002, she was admitted to the Queen Mary Hospital (QMH) in Hong Kong and had 36 gallstones extracted. In September 2006, Shum was diagnosed with a liver tumor and cancer around the gallbladder. Doctors immediately removed one third of her liver.

Prior to a cholecystectomy done in 2002, she had bile duct inflammation in 1978 and again in 1989. On 22 September 2006, the inflammation recurred. Four days later, it had complicated her liver and she went into a coma until 1 October. Once again, on 29 January 2007, she entered the operating room to remove a liver tumor which weighed 2.7 kg. On 8 March 2007, the tumor was found to be growing so she had another surgery.

Shum was admitted to the intensive care ward of QMH on 22 January 2008 and checked out four days later. Shum's mother died in Canada while Shum was in hospital. She was once again admitted to the intensive care ward of QMH on 2 February 2008, where her condition worsened. On 19 February, at 3 am, her family decided that Shum's life support should be withdrawn. It was decided that her breathing apparatus would be removed and that her family spend time with her by her bedside. Shum died at 8:38 a.m. local time that day. She was 62 years old. Prior to her death, she had liver cancer for two years. As part of the treatment for her illness, she underwent chemotherapy and several rounds of kidney dialysis treatment. On 24 February 2008, escorted by her daughter Joyce, Shum's body was flown on a Cathay Pacific passenger flight from Hong Kong to Vancouver, British Columbia, Canada. On 27 February, Shum was buried at Burnaby's Forest Lawn Memorial Park in a private ceremony. Video footage of the funeral was played at a memorial event at the Hong Kong Coliseum on 2 March.

=== Fei-fei Day ===
Fei-fei Day was proclaimed in Vancouver, British Columbia, Canada, for 1 June 2008 (Shum's Chinese lunar calendar birthday). Mayor Sam Sullivan proclaimed this memorial day in Vancouver on 26 February 2008, a week after Shum's death. On 21 July 2022 she was featured as a Google Doodle.

== Filmography ==
=== Films ===
This is a partial list of films.

- 1965 The Lotus Lamp
- 1967 A Girl's Secret
- 1967 Broadcast Queen
- 1967 Every Girl a Romantic Dreamer – Sai
- 1967 Finding a Wife in a Blind Way
- 1967 The Flying Killer (aka Chivalrous Girl in the Air) – Chow Mei-Ha
- 1967 Happy Years – Cheung Lan
- 1967 The Iron Lady Against the One-eyed Dragon
- 1967 Three Women in a Factory – Chow Siu-Yuk.
- 1967 Waste Not Our Youth – Fei Fei
- 1967 Unforgettable First Love
- 1968 Lady Songbird
- 1968 Happy Years
- 1968 Four Gentlemanly Flowers
- 1968 A Blundering Detective and a Foolish Thief
- 1968 Won't You Give Me a Kiss?
- 1968 Teenage Love
- 1968 Wonderful Youth
- 1968 We All Enjoy Ourselves Tonight
- 1969 Moments of Glorious Beauty
- 1969 The Little Warrior
- 1969 Teddy Girls – Yeung Siu-Kiu
- 1969 To Catch a Cat
- 1969 A Big Mess
- 1969 One Day at a Time
- 1970 Secret Agent No. 1
- 1970 Happy Times
- 1970 The Mad Bar
- 1971 The Invincible Eight
- 1972 Songs and Romance Forever
- 1973 The Private Eye
- 1973 Love Is a Four Letter Word
- 1973 If Tomorrow Comes
- 1973 The House of 72 Tenants – Shanghai Po
- 1974 The Country Bumpkin
- 1974 Tenants of Talkative Street
- 1974 Lovable Mr. Able
- 1974 The Crazy Instructor
- 1974 The Country Bumpkin in Style
- 1974 Kissed by the Wolves
- 1975 Pretty Swindler
- 1975 Don't Call Me Uncle
- 1975 Sup Sap Bup Dup
- 1976 You are Wonderful – also director
- 1976 Love in Hawaii
- 1977 The Great Man
- 1982 Cat vs Rat
- 1984 Drunken Tai Chi
- 1986 The Millionaire's Express
- 1987 It's a Mad, Mad, Mad World
- 1987 Mr. Handsome (1987)
- 1988 Tiger on the Beat [cameo]
- 1988 Double Fattiness
- 1988 Mother vs. Mother
- 1988 King of Stanley Market
- 1988 Faithfully Yours
- 1988 It's a Mad, Mad, Mad World II
- 1989 The Bachelor's Swan-Song
- 1989 City Squeeze
- 1989 Eat a Bowl of Tea
- 1989 It's a Mad, Mad, Mad World III
- 1989 Lost Souls
- 1991 The Banquet
- 1991 The Perfect Match
- 1992 It's a Mad, Mad, Mad World Too
- 1993 The Laughter of Water Margins
- 1993 Perfect Couples
- 1993 He Ain't Heavy, He's My Father
- 1995 Just Married
- 1997 Fitness Tour
- 1997 Happy Together [2]
- 2001 The Stamp of Love
- 2001–2005 Living with Lydia
- 2003 Miss Du Shi Niang
- 2004 In-Laws, Out-Laws
- 2006 Where Are They Now?
