= The Young Men =

Hong Kong folk/rock band

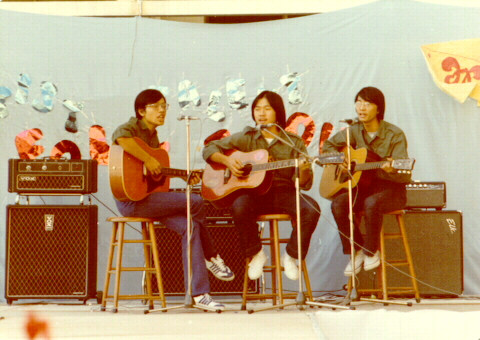
- The Young Men at Hong Kong Concert 1970. L to R - Stephen Lam, Carl Wu, Ralph Wong

Background information
- Also known as: CRS
- Origin: Hong Kong, United States
- Genres: Folk Rock, Country Rock, Soft rock
- Years active: 1968–1971

The Young Men was a Hong Kong folk/rock band in the late 1960s and early 1970s featured in the local media as the answer to the super American band Crosby, Stills, Nash & Young. The group consisted of Stephen Lam (lead vocal, guitars, harmonicas), Ralph Wong (vocal, guitars, harmonicas), and Carl Wu (vocal, guitars, keyboard). They performed in the 1971 Hong Kong Festival and were regularly as featured artist in the Hong Kong TVB variety TV show, Enjoy Yourself Tonight, in the early 1970s.

== Biography ==
Stephen Lam was a troubadour solo artist in the Hong Kong club scene singing cover tunes by Simon and Garfunkel, Bob Dylan, James Taylor, Cat Stevens, the Eagles & the Beatles. Wong and Wu were in a pop band with a couple of girl singers. The three met in a fund raising concert in a high school. They hitched and hooked up to form the CRS (Carl (a.k.a. Karl), Ralph & Stephen) following the format of the American group CSN (Crosby, Stills & Nash) style of folk rock music. Their repertoire included covers for CSNY, Beatles, Eagles, Arlo Guthrie, James Taylor & Joni Mitchell.

They later changed their band's name to The Young Men and became popular in the local music scene. They placed second in the 1971 Hong Kong Music Festival and signed a contract with Hong Kong TVB to perform weekly in the famous Enjoy Yourself Tonight variety show. They were highly praised by HKTVB emcees Ivan Ho Sau-Shun, Lisa Wong Ming-Chuen Liza Wang and producer Robert Chua Wah-Peng. During this time, they performed in various concerts and functions with many peer Hong Kong musicians and bands such as Grace Chan, Jennifer Luk, Samuel Hui, Joe Chan, Agnes Chan, The Losers (later changed name to The Wynners), etc. Check the 1970 Hong Kong English pop.

They were interviewed by the Hong Kong Standard newspaper and an article was published with headline "Stephen, Ralph & Karl, Hong Kong's answer to CSNY".

The band was performing in the local music scene between 1968 and 1971, before they broke up for personal reasons. Lam and Wu went to the United States to further their study. Wong continued to perform solo and with other local Hong Kong artists.

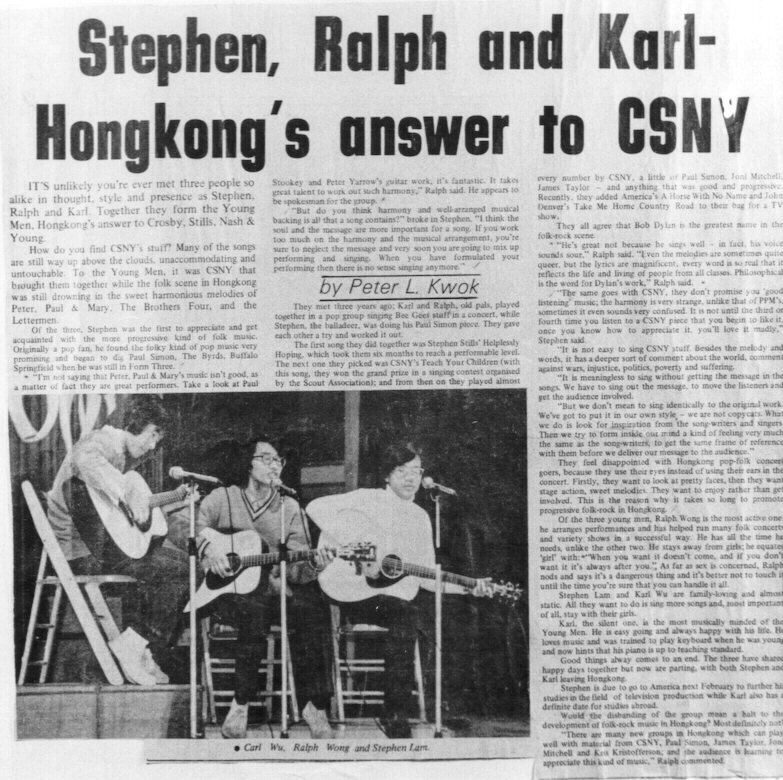

Lam went to Houston, Texas and graduated in engineering at University of Houston. He married a local girl and has a family in Houston. He continued to play music with regional Houston bands - Pete Martinez Band, Diana Dee and the Different Shades, The Powerline, and NightWish. He has written about 10 original songs over the years. Here is one of them from the 1970's - https://Spanish Love Story

From 2013 till present, Lam has been performing locally in Houston as a solo artist. Houston Radio KPFT interviewed him on a couple of radio shows hosted by Chris Collins.

Wu went to Illinois, finished his master's degree in Engineering and returned to Hong Kong to work for the Hong Kong MTR rail system. He is married and is still active in playing music.

Wong died on November 5, 2013.
