= China Entertainment Television =

Television channel in China

China Entertainment Television 华娱卫视广播有限公司
- Type: Mandarin Chinese-language satellite television channel
- Country: Hong Kong; China
- Availability: Satellite television channel
- Broadcast area: Greater China
- Owner: TOM Group (64%); Turner Broadcasting System (36%)
- Official website: cetv.com

China Entertainment Television (CETV) was a Hong Kong-based Mandarin Chinese satellite television channel in the Greater China region, owned jointly by TOM Group (majority shareholder) and the United States’ TBS Networks (36% shareholder). The broadcaster was originally based in Kowloon Tong, Hong Kong, but moved to Shenzhen, China in 2003.

At launch, the channel was known for its policy of "no sex, no violence and no news" (its founder Robert Chua was known for his sexual activities, including the Hong Kong adult video magazine Le Club). Chua said that the launch of CETV was an opportunity for him to create a network that practiced values elevated by Walt Disney, who Chua considered to be a moneymaker, as well as traditional Asian values to counter western programming. Experimental broadcasts started on 1 December 1994 with 12 hours of programming, six hours of original content and six hours of repeats; on 11 March 1995, the network launched its regular broadcast, with a 24-hour schedule.

The network faced liquidation on 8 July 1998, with debts worth HK$13 million. In October 2001, it entered into an agreement with AOLTimeWarner to carry Miami Vice and The Powerpuff Girls in exchange for carriage of CCTV-9 to Time Warner Cable subscribers in the New York, Houston and Los Angeles. As of the time of the transaction, CETV's audience in China consisted of seven million homes in Guangdong province alone.

It ended broadcasting on 31 December 2016.
