= Citybeat (band) =

Hong Kong pop music group

Citybeat 城市節拍
- Origin: Hong Kong
- Genre: Pop
- Years active: 1980s
- Past members: John Laudon; Daryl Ching; Jerry Marshall; Jym Kay; Chuck D. Eddy

Citybeat (Chinese: 城市節拍) was a pop music group that was active in Hong Kong during the 1980s. There are five members in the group, namely:

- John Laudon (Chinese: 劉諾生)
- Daryl Ching (Chinese: 陳華添)
- Jerry Marshall
- Jym Kay
- Chuck D. Eddy (Chinese: 李克)－(replaced Daryl Ching on guitar in 1990)

== History ==
John Laudon (singer) wrote numerous songs for Hong Kong Pop stars. Jym Kay (drummer) was the Host of the television program "Solid Gold" on TVB and also on ETV. The band toured in China, The United States, Australia, Singapore, Malaysia, India, and Macau.

All of them are foreigners in Hong Kong. They sang songs in English, but later became known as the first American band to record songs in Cantonese as they recorded 3 Albums in Cantonese and One in English. Some of their songs spread the messages of Christianity.

== Publications ==
Citybeat was a Hong Kong-based pop and rock band active primarily during the 1980s and early 1990s. Known for their extensive performance schedule, Citybeat played more live shows than any other band in Hong Kong at the time. Their performances ranged from street shows and club appearances to major venues such as the Hong Kong Coliseum, Ko Shan Theatre, Queen Elizabeth Stadium, and AC Hall. The band also performed weekly at Rick’s Café in Tsim Sha Tsui.

All members being Christian, Citybeat was active in charitable and community outreach events, appearing in refugee camps, prisons, and schools throughout the region. Over the course of their career, the band recorded four studio albums, released eight music videos, and appeared on numerous television programs and compilation albums.

Citybeat gained widespread recognition thru Radio airplay, Television Music Videos and for their appearance in the Educational Television (eTV) programme Citybeat Comes to Town, created for every Hong Kong primary public schools. Their song “Standing as One” achieved significant airplay during the 1989 Tiananmen Square student movement and became associated with the pro-democracy sentiment of that period. Following the song’s popularity, Citybeat was invited to perform at the Concert for Democracy in China, held at the Happy Valley Racecourse, becoming the only foreign band to participate in the event which had 160,00 in attendance.

== See also ==
- Hong Kong English pop
