= Fitness Tour =

1997 Hong Kong film by Liu Guoquan

- Fitness Tour film poster
- Chinese: 減肥旅行團
- Directed by: Liu Guoquan
- Screenplay by: Yeung Hiu-Hung
- Produced by: Zheng Kai-Nan
- Starring: Lydia Shum; Hou Yiaohua; Gong Hanlin; Jiang Qinqin
- Production company: Sil-Metropole Organisation Ltd.
- Release date: 17 April 1997 (Hong Kong)
- Running time: 90 minutes
- Country: Hong Kong
- Language: Cantonese

Fitness Tour (traditional Chinese: 減肥旅行團; simplified Chinese: 减肥旅行团) is a 1997 Hong Kong comedy-drama film. Directed by Liu Guoquan, it stars Lydia Shum, Hou Yiaohua, Gong Hanlin, and Jiang Qinqin. The film is in Cantonese and is 90 minutes long.

== Plot ==
Manager Hou is very wealthy, and he comes up with another idea to make money. He organized a weight loss tour which lets the fat man go to the tourist side of the Three Gorges River. There they can both go sightseeing and lose weight. He asks a beautiful girl, Jingjing, to be the leader, which attracts a lot of fat people. The guide QinQin gradually gets to know Hou's hypocrisy and cheating behavior, and stands up to protect the interests of customers. Hou finally admits his mistakes, and gets everyone's understanding. Finally, all members in the tour more or less lose weight, except Lydia from Hong Kong, who is still very fat and always keeps eating.

== Reception ==
According to Cross-Strait Magazine, the film did well at the box office and had an enthusiastic audience. The Southern Metropolis Daily's Wuji Qiu included the film among a list of "low-quality domestic films that are tantamount to tofu-dreg projects". Qiu said films like Fitness Tour did "a show of buffoon-like characters, unfunny lines, and vulgar performances". Nanjing film critics included Fitness Tour on the "Ranking of Good and Bad Movies" (Chinese: 優劣電影排行榜).

== See also ==
- Weight loss
