= Irene Ryder =

- 黎愛蓮
- Born: 1949; British Hong Kong
- Died: 1 September 2024 (aged 75); North District Hospital, Sheung Shui, Hong Kong
- Occupation: Singer
- Spouse: Bruce Leung (m. 1975; div. 1980)
- Children: 1
- Musical career
- Origin: Hong Kong
- Genres: Hong Kong English pop
- Instrument: Voice
- Years active: 1960s, 1970s

Irene Ryder (Chinese: 黎愛蓮; pinyin: Lí Àilián; 1949 – 1 September 2024) was a Hong Kong English pop singer during the 1960s.

== Career ==
In 1966, Ryder attained the unofficial title of "Go Go Queen" after winning a talent quest. Her first single was "To Sir With Love". Among the other singles that she recorded was "Baby Baby", a duet with Robert Lee, former member of Hong Kong beat band The Thunderbirds and the younger brother of martial arts star Bruce Lee.

In 1966, Ryder became an actress in Hong Kong films. She appeared in The Flying Killer, a 1966 fantasy action film directed by Lung Chien. Ryder's last film was Cuties Parade, a 1975 drama film directed by Pan Lei. Ryder is credited with five films.

In 1969, she was the only female singer chosen to represent Hong Kong at the 1970 World Expo in Osaka, Japan.

Her career ended in 1979 after she was attacked with acid just outside her residence in Tsim Sha Tsui, which caused severe facial injuries and required nearly 20 surgeries.

== Death ==
Ryder died on 1 September 2024, at the age of 75.

== Discography ==
=== Singles and EP ===
- Runnin [EP] - EMI Columbia ECHK-519, 1967
- 1, 2, 3 and I Fell - EMI Columbia CHK-1039, 1968
- Irene Ryder & Robert Lee – "Baby baby" / "You put me down" – EMI Columbia CHK-102, 1968

=== LPs ===
- Irene Ryder – EMI Regal SREG-9603 – 1971
- Irene – EMI Regal SREG-9611 – 1973
- Solitaire – EMI Columbia S-33ESX-220 – 1974
- The Best Of Irene Ryder – EMI Columbia S-33ESX-225 – 1975

=== Compilations ===
- Various Artists: Hit Sounds – "I Don't Know How To Love Him" (Andrew Lloyd Webber/Tim Rice) – Irene Ryder – EMI Regal SREG 9621 – 1975
- Various Artists: 16 Motion Picture Greats For You – (Where Do I Begin?) Love Story" (Francis Lai/Carl Sigman) – Irene Ryder "Speak Softly Love (Love Theme from The Godfather)" (Larry Kusik/Nino Rota) – Irene Ryder – EMI SPR 1001–1977
- Various Artists: Age of 70's EMI 100週年珍藏系列之《西洋風》 – "Help Me Make It Through the Night" (Kris Kristofferson/Fred Foster) – Irene Ryder "You're So Vain" (Carly Simon) – Irene Ryder "All Over The World" (Françoise Hardy) – Irene Ryder "The Last Waltz" (Barry Mason/Les Reed) – Irene Ryder – EMI 7-2438-21249-24 – 1997
- Various Artists: Uncle Ray's Choice – "Baby Baby" – Irene Ryder & Robert Lee (1968) – EMI – 2003

== Sources ==
- 《ACIDent》(The Pearl Report, TVB, 2010-03-07)
