= The Telegraph (Brisbane) =

Australian newspaper

The Telegraph was an evening newspaper published in Brisbane, Queensland, Australia. It was first published on 1 October 1872 and its final edition appeared on 5 February 1988. In its day it was recognised as one of the best news pictorial newspapers in the country. Its Pink Sports edition (printed distinctively on pink newsprint and sold on Brisbane streets from about 6 pm on Saturdays) was a particularly excellent production produced under tight deadlines. It included results and pictures of Brisbane's Saturday afternoon sports including the results of the last horse race of the day.

== History ==
In 1871 a group of local businessmen, Robert Armour, John Killeen Handy (M.L.A. for Brisbane), John Warde, John Burns, J. D. Heale and J. K. Buchanan formed the Telegraph Newspaper Co. Ltd. The editor was Theophilus Parsons Pugh, a former editor of the Brisbane Courier and founder of Pugh's Almanac. The first edition of the newspaper had just four pages and a print run of only 200 copies. In 1963 it moved from its 93 Queen Street premises to its final home in 41 Campbell Street, Bowen Hills (Queensland Newspapers).

== Digitisation ==
The paper has been digitised as part of the Australian Newspapers Digitisation Program of the National Library of Australia.

== Notable staff ==
- Sallyanne Atkinson, journalist (1960 to 1962)
- Ken Blanch, reporter
- Peter Charlton, later the Courier-Mail's national affairs editor, was the business editor of The Courier-Mail and Brisbane Telegraph.
- James Cowlishaw, managing director in 1878.
- Alfred Cecil Chave, journalist, 1930
- Nat Gould
- Barton Green
- Patrick Hamilton, 1998 Walkley Award winning photojournalist
- Thomas William Heney (1920 to 1923)
- Mark Hinchliffe joined as the sports sub-editor in 1981.
- Hector Holthouse, journalist
- Lionel Ker Strutton Hogg
- Edgar George Holt
- Lincoln Howes, now part of the 60 Minutes team, started his career at Brisbane's Telegraph
- Harry Jefferies, Sports Editor
- Chris Mitchell, cadet journalist at the Telegraph, later editor-in-chief of The Australian (2002–2015)
- Mitchell Murphy, now with Brisbane Times, was reporter and columnist covering elite level sport for both the Brisbane Telegraph and Daily Sun.
- Pendil Arthur Rayner (1928 as a cadet (cub) reporter – 1943)
- Kevin Sinclair, reporter, 1962
- Frederick William Ward, editor (1916 – December 1920)
- Charles Wilmott, Assistant Messenger Overseer in the Brisbane Telegraph Office.
