= It's a Mad, Mad, Mad World =

1987 Hong Kong film by Clifton Ko

- Film poster
- Directed by: Clifton Ko Chi-sum
- Screenplay by: Clifton Ko Chi-sum
- Produced by: Linda Kuk
- Starring: Bill Tung; Lydia Shum; Eric Tsang Chi-wai; Elsie Chan; David Chiang
- Cinematography: Derek Wan
- Edited by: Wong Yee-shun
- Music by: Richard Yuen
- Production companies: D & B Films
- Release date: January 28, 1987 (Hong Kong)
- Running time: 100 minutes
- Country: Hong Kong
- Language: Cantonese
- Box office: HK$27.1 million

It's a Mad, Mad, Mad World (Chinese: 富貴逼人) is a 1987 Hong Kong Chinese New Year film, directed by Clifton Ko. It starred Bill Tung and Lydia Sum as parents of the dysfunctional Piu family. The daughters were played by Elsie Chan, Loletta Lee and Pauline Kwan.

The comedy was very popular and the original cast of Tung, Shum, Chan, Lee and Kwan reappeared in its sequels It's a Mad, Mad, Mad World II (富貴再逼人) (1988), It's a Mad, Mad, Mad World III (富貴再三逼人) (1989) and It's a Mad, Mad, Mad World Too (富貴黃金屋) (1992). The plots of the films are all about the family becoming suddenly rich, usually through lotteries. The family also made a cameo appearance in The Banquet (1991).

== Cast ==
This is a partial cast list.

- Bill Tung - Uncle Bill
- Lydia Sum - Aunty Lydia
- Eric Tsang - Smiley Joe
- Charine Chan Ka-Ling - Jody's teacher
- David Chiang - John
- Loletta Lee - Loletta
- Pauline Kwan Pui-Lam - Jody
- Leung San - Miss Lui Mor
- Raymond Fung Sai-Hung - Mr Fung
- Cheng Siu-Ping - Auntie Nam
- Elsie Chan Yik-Si - May

== Release ==
It's a Mad, Mad, Mad World was released in Hong Kong on January 28, 1987, marking of the Chinese New Year's Eve. It grossed a total of HK$27,141,624 on its initial release.
