= Hector Holthouse =

Australian journalist and author

Hector Le Gay Holthouse (15 April 1915 – 16 November 1991) was an Australian journalist and author.

Holthouse was born in 1915 in Toowoomba, Queensland. While working as a chemist for the Queensland Sugar industry in North Queensland prior to the Second World War, Holthouse became interested in the history of the area. He took up journalism, writing for the Brisbane Telegraph for many years, and lecturing in journalism at the University of Queensland. He wrote a number of popular history books about Queensland, which were published between 1967 and 1991.

== Bibliography ==
- River of Gold: the Story of the Palmer River Gold Rush, Angus and Robertson, 1967, ISBN 0-207-13318-2
- Cannibal Cargoes, Rigby, 1969, ISBN 0-85179-057-7
- Up Rode the Squatter, Rigby, 1970, ISBN 0-85179-053-4
- Cyclone: a Century of Australian Cyclonic Destruction, Rigby, 1971, ISBN 0-207-15309-4
- North Queensland in Colour, Rigby, 1970, ISBN 0-85179-067-4
- Barrier Reef in Colour, Rigby, 1971, ISBN 0-85179-219-7
- Gold Coast in Colour, Rigby, 1971, ISBN 0-85179-130-1
- Gympie Gold - A Dramatic Story of Queensland Gold, Angus & Robertson, 1973, ISBN 0-207-12577-5
- S'pose I Die: the Story of Evelyn Maunsell, Angus & Robertson, 1973, ISBN 0-207-12705-0
- Looking Back: the First 150 Years of Queensland Schools, Queensland Department of Education, 1975, ISBN 0-7242-0218-8
- Ships in the Coral - Explorers, Wrecks and Traders of the Northern Australian Coast, MacMillan, 1976, ISBN 0-333-21053-0
- Illustrated History of Queensland, Rigby, 1978, ISBN 0-7270-0538-3
- Illustrated History of Brisbane, Reed, 1982, ISBN 0-589-50322-7
- Illustrated History of the Gold Coast, Reed, 1982, ISBN 0-589-50327-8
- Illustrated History of the Sunshine Coast, Reed, 1982, ISBN 0-589-50390-1
- White Headhunter, Angus & Robertson, 1988, ISBN 0-207-15897-5
- The Australian Geographic Book of Cape York, Australian Geographic, 1991, ISBN 1-86276-002-0
- Pages from the Past: some Historical Records of the Holthouse Family, Sybil Holthouse, 1992, ISBN 0-646-10898-0
