= Zight =

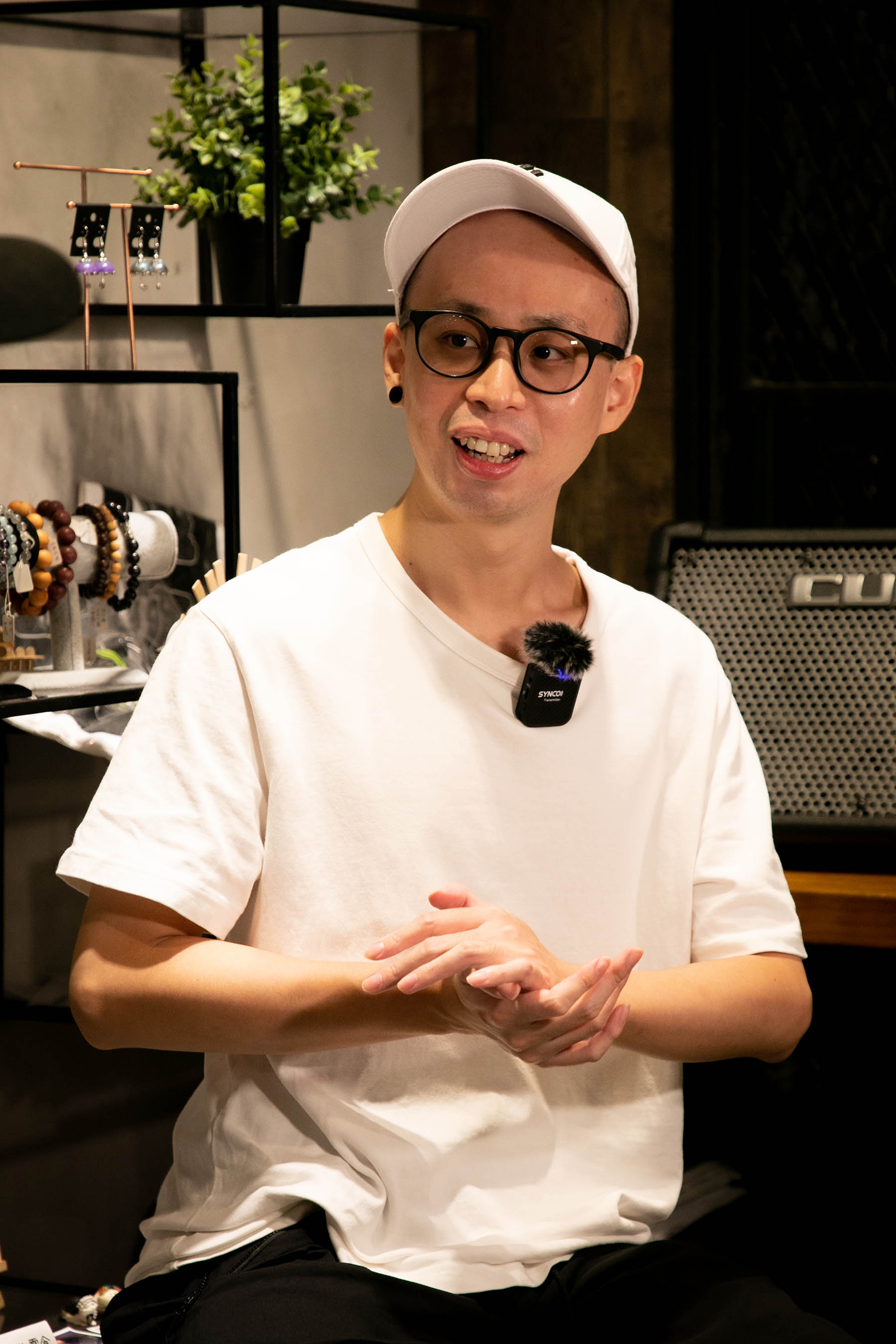
- Zight in an interview, 2022

Background information
- Genres: EDM; electro house; progressive house; big room house; future house
- Occupations: Electronic musician; songwriter; record producer
- Instruments: Ableton Live; piano; guitar
- Years active: 2020–present
- Labels: Universal Music Group (U-NXT), MIX FEED

Birth name
- Traditional Chinese: 邱耀鋌
- Literal meaning: Mountains, light, ore
Transcriptions
Yue: Cantonese
- Jyutping: Jau^{1} Jiu^{6} Ting^{2}
- IPA: [jɐw˥ jiw˨.tʰɪŋ˧˥]

Yau Yiu Ting (Cantonese: [jɐ́u jìːu.tʰěŋ]), better known by his stage name Zight, is an electronic dance music (EDM) producer and songwriter from Hong Kong.

Zight landed his first international collaboration "Fly Away" with British singer Sonna Rele in 2021.

During a radio interview, Zight revealed that his stage name was derived from his middle name "light". He first applied his alias Zight on BeatStars because the user-name "light" has been registered by another user.

== Early life ==
During a live interview, he mentioned a huge vinyl and CD cabinet of his father, which contains very diverse genres of Western music. Among the many genres of music, Eurodance was his particular favorite. He was a fan of Eurodance groups such as Vengaboys, Aqua and 2 Unlimited. He explained that his childhood interest in Eurodance music lead him to become an electronic music producer after his graduation from music school.

Zight studied creative media and music production at the City University of Hong Kong. During his college days, he started selling beats and rhythms to hip hop artists on BeatStars, where he first applied Zight as his stage name.

== Career ==
After his graduation from college, Zight spent several years to make music behind the scenes for local musicians and Japanese hip hop groups. In 2018, he visited London to further study electronic music at Point Blank Music School. Later in 2020, he released his first electronic music single, "Paradise".

In 2021, he landed his first international collaboration, "Fly Away" with British singer Sonna Rele. The song was published by U-NXT, a subdivision of Universal Music Group to empower new electronic music artists. The music video was shot in Ukraine, which has gained over 1.7 million views on YouTube as of November 2022.

On 1 October 2021, Zight released his third single, "Everybody Keep Running" with Canadian singer Peter Forest. The music video took place in Cape Town, featuring Sibusiso Madikizela, a national marathon athlete from South Africa. The song was later nominated and selected into the Asian electronic music compilation Billboard Electric Asia Vol. 5.

In 2022, Zight released his sixth single, "Number One" with American singer Adam Christopher. The music video was shot at Winton Motor Raceway, a motor racing track near Melbourne, Australia.

In July 2022, Zight released his seventh single, "Work It Harder" with American pop singer Chris Willis and Italian DJ duo Maximals. During an interview, Zight revealed that the music video was an implication to support Ukraine in the Russo-Ukrainian War.

== Singles ==
As lead artist

Title	Year	Album	Ref
"Paradise"	2020	Non-album singles	
"Fly Away" (with Sonna Rele)	2021	Non-album singles	
"The Birth"	2021	Suite No. 1 in Z Major	
"On Rainy Days"	2021	Suite No. 1 in Z Major	
"Summer"	2021	Suite No. 1 in Z Major	
"What Is Love"	2021	Suite No. 1 in Z Major	
"Winter in the Woods"	2021	Suite No. 1 in Z Major	
"The Christmas Song"	2021	Suite No. 1 in Z Major	
"Everybody Keep Running" (with Peter Forest)	2021	Non-album singles	
"Daisy" (with Oliviya Nicole)	2021	Non-album singles	
"Number One" (with Booty Leak & Adam Christopher)	2022	Non-album singles	
"Work It Harder" (with Chris Willis & Maximals)	2022	Non-album singles	
"Waiting" (with Klapse & AndyBear)	2023	Non-album singles	
"Mongolia"	2023	Non-album singles	

As featured artist

Title	Year	Album	Ref
"Step into a World" (MEKOLI featuring The Freeman & Zight)	2009	Non-album singles	
"Yamanote Line Dreamer" (Midicronica featuring Zight & Low Jack Three)	2011	Non-album singles	
"Everybody Keep Running" (TL Hon featuring Zight)	2021	Non-album singles	
