= The Star (Hong Kong) =

Tabloid published in Hong Kong from 1965 to 1984

The Star was Hong Kong's first tabloid newspaper, founded in 1965 by Graeme Jenkins, an Australian journalist.

Jenkins started out working on national and Melbourne newspapers in Victoria, Australia, but was drafted when World War II broke out. By 1945, he had landed a job as war correspondent for The Argus. He joined Reuters in Hong Kong in 1948. Before founding The Star, he had worked at The Standard also in Hong Kong. He was unashamedly racist, once quipping: "If [the Chinese] can't speak bloody English then they're not worth fucking speaking to."

In 1968, its editor was Alfred Lee, another Australian journalist, with tabloid experience. English news editor was Martin Warneminde, Chinese news editor Frank Ng Hong-chi, racing editor Vladimir "Vova" Rodney, entertainment editor Anders Nelsson, chief sub-editor Australian David Norgaard; reporters included New Zealander Kevin Sinclair, Geoffrey Hawthorne (later to be news editor of Truth), Henry Parwani, Geoffrey V Somers (yet another Australian), Alberto da Cruz, Mike Rowse, Indian Ranjan Marwah, Canadian Osmond J Turner and Albert Cheng, with photographer Solomon Yung.

When the newspaper was closed in 1984, 120 employees lost their jobs virtually overnight. The news came as a shock because the newspaper had increased its readership in the years before closure.

== See also ==
- List of newspapers in Hong Kong
