= Robert Chua =

Singaporean broadcaster

Robert Chua Wah-Peng
- 蔡和平
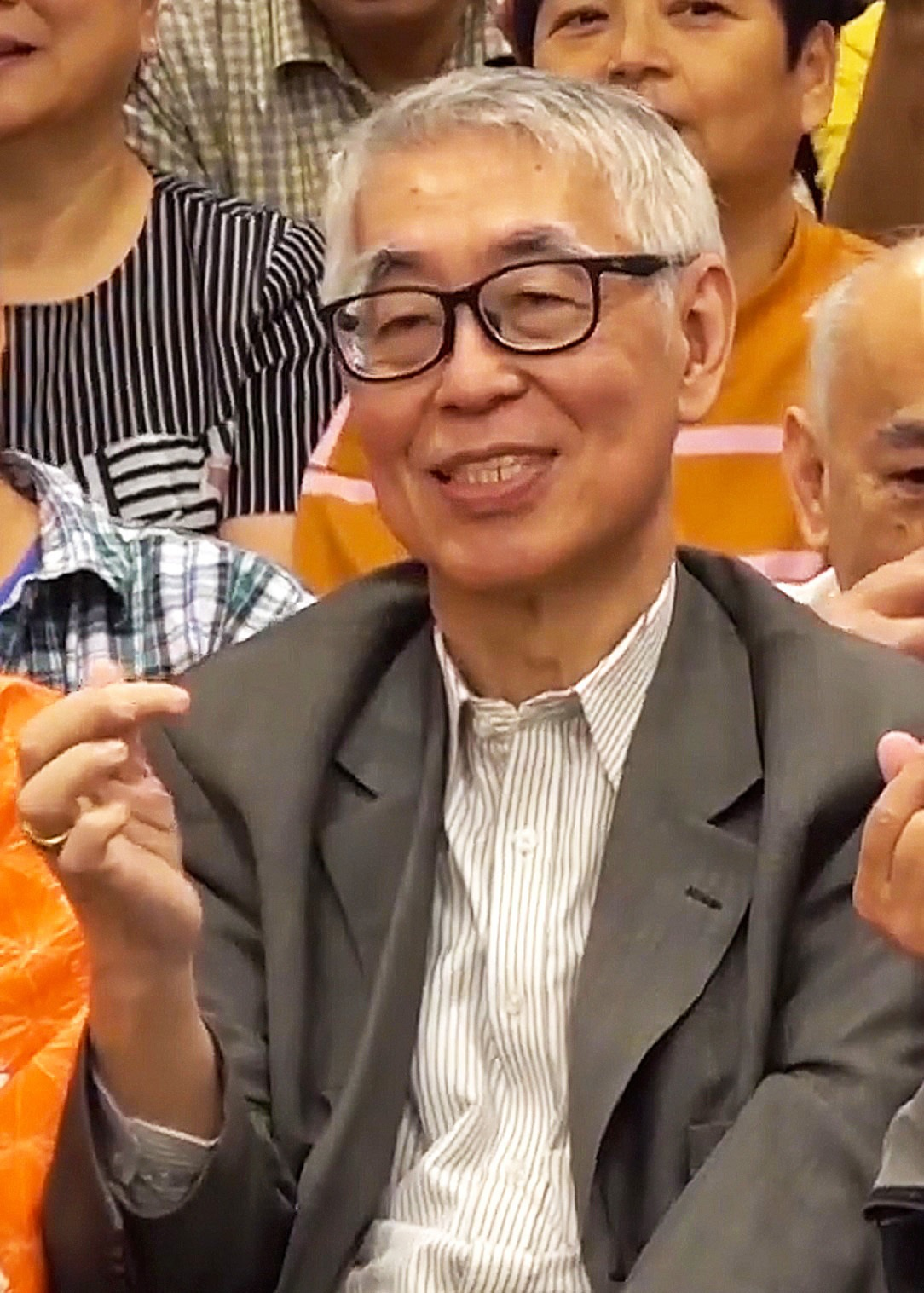
- Born: 20 May 1946 (age 79); Colony of Singapore
- Spouse: Yam Peng-peng (m. 1974)
- Website: www.robertchua.com

Robert Chua Wah-Peng (born 20 May 1946) is a Singaporean broadcaster and businessman.

== Background ==
Born in 1946 in Colony of Singapore, on 20 May 1946, he has worked internationally in Australia, Hong Kong and China as well. Among other activities in his career, he was part of the launch of television production company TVB in 1967; the creator of Enjoy Yourself Tonight, the longest-running "live" variety show in Hong Kong; and the founder of satellite television channel of China Entertainment Television (CETV).
