= Kevin Sinclair (journalist) =

Hong Kong journalist

Kevin Maxwell Sinclair, MBE, (12 December 1942 – 23 December 2007) was a New Zealand journalist and author who spent more than 50 years reporting the news, over 40 of those in Hong Kong.

== Early life ==
Sinclair was born in Thornton, Wellington, New Zealand, to 16-year-old Margaret Hocking of Cornish extraction and a mixed Polynesian father who left, never to return, when he was three. A decade later, his mother remarried, and Sinclair did not get along with his stepfather. It was with some relief that, upon completing high school, he left home to take up an opening as a labourer-cadet with the Forestry Service at the age of 16. At 14, he was deeply affected by Edgar Snow's glowing 1937 account of the Chinese Communist Party, Red Star Over China, later rating it the book that most influenced his outlook.

== Career in journalism ==
Sinclair started as a 16-year-old copy boy at the Wellington Evening Post and then The Dominion for a year. Having left New Zealand in 1961, he lucked into his first job in Australia as the sole employee (and editor) of the south Queensland tourist-targeted rag, the Surfers Paradise Guide, and, by 1962, he was working as a reporter at Brisbane's The Telegraph. He spent a year crime reporting at Sydney's The Daily Telegraph from 1964, another year back at The Dominion, and then joined the sensationalist New Zealand Truth. He finally left his second stint at The Daily Telegraph to join The Star, another sensationalist tabloid, in Hong Kong, as news editor, in 1968. He arrived on the SS Oronsay in the spring of that year.

Sinclair described the quality of his journalism in the 60s as "disgraceful" and "irresponsible" while taking to it with unbridled and unashamed alacrity. The New Zealand Truth, where he had been a reporter, was a

training ground for generations of journalistic hoodlums, practised evaders of the truth and reporters who lived by skillful exaggeration and downright lies.

On seeing out his two-year contract at The Star in 1970, he moved to the Hong Kong Standard as news editor. In 1972, he became news editor at the South China Morning Post, and, after a July 1978 demotion resulting from alcoholism, continued on in the newsroom till 1986, returning in 2003 to write for the Post's 100th anniversary publication, Post Impressions.

Sinclair was the author of some 24 books. His first, No Cure, No Pay: Salvage in the South China Seas was published by SCMP Books in 1981 and his last, Tell Me A Story: Forty Years of Newspapering in Hong Kong and China, also by SCMP Books, was published shortly before his death.

== Political standpoint ==
Sinclair was deeply distrustful of democracy for Hong Kong, believing that one man, one vote would turn it into a "give-it-away society". In 2007, Sinclair stated that he would "sooner vote for a rabid dog" than a democrat. He scoffed at suggestions of future communist repression and the jailing of dissidents.

== Personal life ==
Sinclair married his first wife, Robyn, in Sydney in 1963, but the marriage only lasted four years. He married Kathleen "Kit" Allred in Hong Kong on 16 December 1972. Allred was a volunteer with the US Peace Corps who had moved to Hong Kong from Korea three years earlier. They had two children, David and Kiri.

Sinclair died at the age of 65 after a long battle with cancer. Four days before his death, he had attended a book signing at Hong Kong's Foreign Correspondents' Club - an event even attended by Hong Kong Chief Executive Donald Tsang who he counted among his many friends, including Singapore's Prime Minister Lee Kwan Yew and billionaire transport magnate Sir Tang Shiu-kin among his friends. A celebration of his life was held at the Hong Kong Police Officers' Club on 7 January 2008 attended by 300 government officials, close friends and colleagues.

== Honours ==
In 1983, Sinclair received an MBE from Queen Elizabeth for his contribution to the community through journalism. He was named "Person Of The Year" for 2007 in a poll run by the Government-owned radio station, RTHK.
