= Where Are They Now? (TVB) =

2006 TVB program

- Developed by: TVB
- Presented by: Lydia Shum
- Starring: Approximately 30 other Hong Kong celebrities See list below
- Country of origin: Hong Kong
- Original language: Cantonese
- No. of seasons: 1
- No. of episodes: 32

Production
- Production locations: Taiwan; Japan; USA; Canada (Toronto; Vancouver)
- Running time: Approx. 30 minutes per episode

Where Are They Now? (Traditional Chinese: 友緣相聚) is a show hosted by Lydia Shum in 2006, and was shown on TVB in 2006, as well as on Fairchild TV in Canada in 2007 and 2008. Throughout the 32 episodes, Lydia Shum travelled to Taiwan, Japan, USA, and Canada to interview popular celebrities of the 1960s in Hong Kong and Taiwan. Most of these celebrities have now emigrated to foreign countries.

== Naming of Show ==
The show's title in Chinese is an idiom, which translates to "If we are predestined to meet, we will". The first character in the original idiom (有, meaning "have"), was swapped by another character (友, meaning "friends") with the same pronunciation, which turns the meaning of the title to "We are predestined as friends, and we are meeting [again]".

== Future of Show ==
It was speculated that the show was to go longer than 32 episodes, with Lydia Shum traveling to Australia and other countries to interview more former celebrities. However, by the time the show was completed, Shum's health was failing, and production was halted at 32 episodes. It has been speculated that TVB has made plans for Joyce Cheng, Lydia's daughter, to host the show after Shum passes on. Shum died on 19 February 2008.

== Cast list ==
| Episode Number | Interviewee | Profession | Location (If known) |
|---|---|---|---|
| 1 | Introduction | N/A | Hong Kong |
| 2 | Jimmy Wang Yu | Film Actor | Taiwan |
| 3 | Hu Jin | Film Actress | Taiwan |
| 4 | Regina Tsang | 2nd Runner-Up of 1978 Miss Hong Kong beauty pageant | Taiwan |
| 5 | Zhang Mei Yao | Film Actress | Taiwan |
| 6 | Tang Lan Hua | Film Actress/Singer | Taiwan |
| 7 | Chung Ling Ling (Betty Chung) | Actress/Singer | Southern California, USA |
| 8 | Elaine Shin Wing Yan | Winner of 1973 Miss Hong Kong beauty pageant | California, USA |
| 9 | Suen Zhong and Kam Fei | Movie Director/Actress | Seattle, USA |
| 10 | Chun Cheung Lim | Film Actor | Los Angeles, USA |
| 11; 12 | Judy Ongg | Singer | Tokyo, Japan |
| 13 | Agnes Chan | Singer | Tokyo, Japan |
| 14 | Ka Ling | Film Actress | Bangkok, Thailand |
| 15 | David Chiang and Lee Lam Lam | Film/Television Actors | Vancouver, British Columbia, Canada |
| 16; 17 | Yue Wah and Tien Ni | Film/Television Actors | Vancouver, British Columbia, Canada |
| 18 | Sam Wong and Christine Leung | Television Hosts | Vancouver, British Columbia, Canada |
| 19 | Lau Fung Ping | Singer | Vancouver, British Columbia, Canada |
| 20; 21 | Chan Lai Sze and Ho Shau San | Singer/Television Host | Toronto, Ontario, Canada |
| 22 | Chu Shui Tong | Stage/Television Actor | Toronto, Ontario, Canada |
| 23 | Chan Chuen | Outdoor filming transportation operator, television host | Toronto, Ontario, Canada |
| 24; 25 | Nora Miao | Film/Television Actress | Richmond Hill, Ontario, Canada |
| 26 | Stanley So | News Anchor | Toronto, Ontario, Canada |
| 27 | Ho Kit Ching | News Anchor | Markham, Ontario, Canada |
| 28; 29 | Tsui Fung | Film Actress | Shanghai, China |
| 30; 31 | Lily Ho | Film Actress | Shanghai, China |
| 32 | Conclusion (a gathering of those who were not able to be interviewed for a hotpot dinner) | N/A | Vancouver, British Columbia, Canada |
