= Anders Nelsson =

Hong Kong singer, musician and composer (b. 1946)

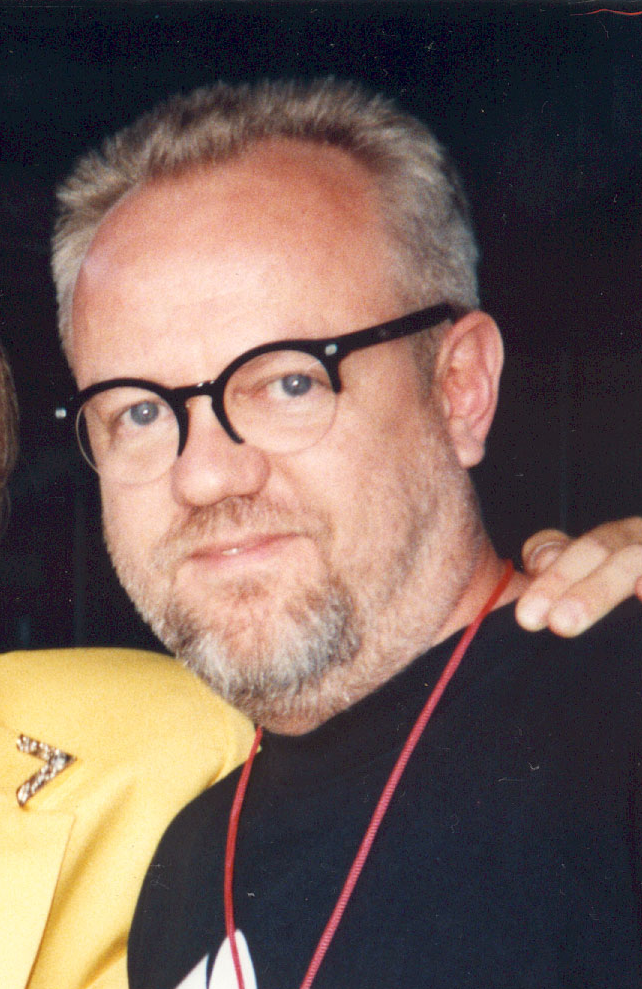
- Nelsson in 1980
- Born: Anders Gustav Nelsson; June 10, 1949 (age 77); Berkeley, California, U.S.
- Occupations: Singer; songwriter; musician; composer; record producer; actor
- Years active: 1958–present
- Musical career
- Origin: Hong Kong
- Genres: Pop; film score
- Instruments: Vocals; guitar; bass guitar
- Labels: Orbit Records, Diamond Music HK, EMI Records, UK Records HK, Mutual Chord Records
- Formerly of: The Vampires; The Kontinentals; Anders Nelson & The Inspiration; The Anders Nelson Group; Ming; Infinity; The Melody Bank

Chinese name
- Traditional Chinese: 聶安達
- Simplified Chinese: 聂安达
Transcriptions
Standard Mandarin
- Hanyu Pinyin: Niè āndá
Yue: Cantonese
- Jyutping: Nip^{6} Ngon^{1} Daat^{6}

Anders Gustav Nelsson (Chinese: 聶安達; born 10 June 1946) is an American-born Hong Kong singer, songwriter, composer, record producer, and actor. He's been a figure in Hong Kong pop music since the 1960s, and has also composed many film soundtracks.

== Early life ==
Nelsson was born in Berkeley, California in 1946, to Swedish missionary parents. His family moved to Hong Kong in 1950 when he was 4 years old, where his parents were employed by the Tao Fong Shan Christian Centre. He studied at King George V School between 1958 and 1965, where he learned Cantonese. Older students allowed him to play in their bands in school hall. They played on Friday afternoons.

== Music career ==
=== 1950s and 1960s ===
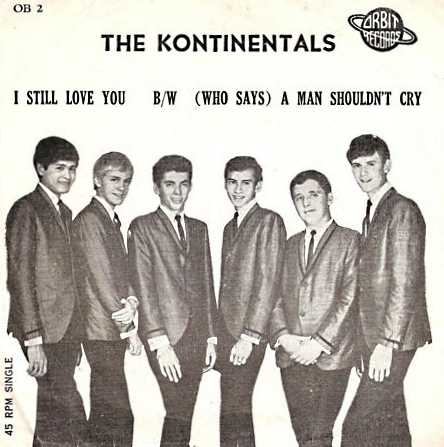
The Kontinentals - I Still Love You

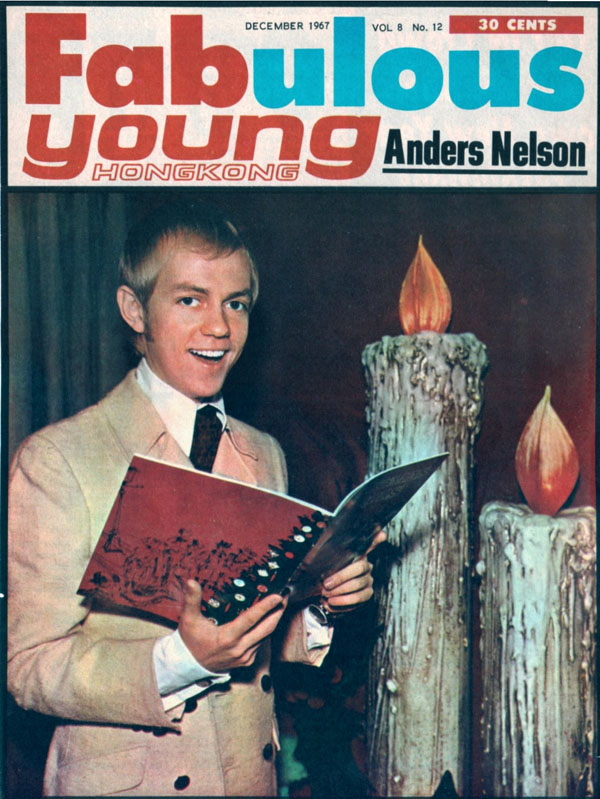
Nelsson on the cover of Fabulous Young Hong Kong magazine.

In the late 1950s, Nelsson was in a band called The Cagey 5 which was a twist around of the name of their school King George V. In a few years the band had become The Kontinentals. In 1963, The Kontinentals, signed their first recording contract and shortly afterwards released I Think Of Her and I Still Love You, released on the Orbit Records label. Both were chart-topping hits in Hong Kong. He was entertainment editor for the evening newspaper The Star in 1968.

=== 1970s and 1980s ===
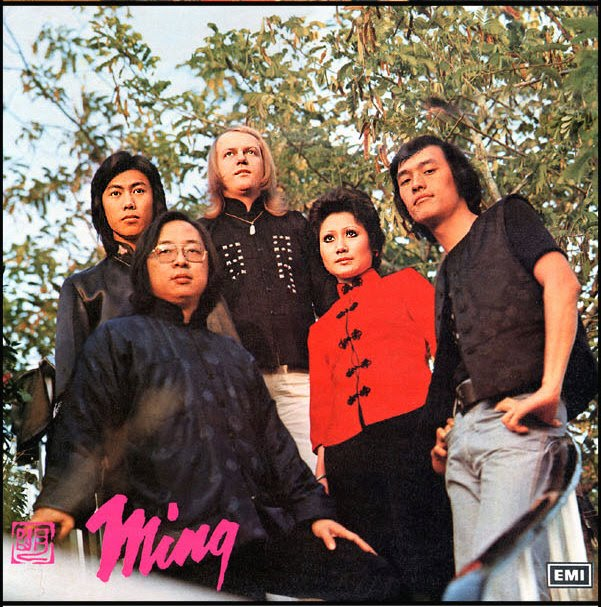
Ming record cover

In the 1970s, Nelson was the front man in a band called Ming signed to EMI records. The band was formed in 1973 and lasted until 1976. Most of the recordings the band made were composed by Nelsson. Some of the band's notable releases in the 1970s included "Never Coming Home" and "Reasons Why". Due to a few things he'd seen with other bands that included drinking backstage and taking drugs, also not wanting to sing past 30, he decided on a change of direction and as a result, he broke up Ming.

In 1976 he switched to composing and producing and has written many jingles and film soundtracks, including the main theme for the popular horror comedy film Mr. Vampire.

From 1976 to 1979, he worked for the Hong Kong branch of EMI Records as Artist & Repertoire Manager. In 1979, he started The Melody Bank, a production and publishing house, and The Entertainment Company, a talent managing company whose clients included Louie Castro.

In 1989, he sold The Melody Bank to BMG Pacific Limited and became a Managing Director. In this role he set up BMG's music publishing operations in the Asian region as well as running the record company in Hong Kong.

The artists that Nelsson has produced include Gracie Rivera, Mona Richardson, Carole and Perry Martin.

=== 1990s onwards ===
After completing his three-year contract, Nelsson was sought by the prominent Swaine family (patriarch of this family, Sir John Joseph Swaine, was at the time chairman of both the Royal HK Jockey Club and the Legislative Council.) A new company called The Media Bank was set up under the chairmanship of elder son John Swaine Jr., with Nelsson as managing director. Through Nelsson's music industry contacts, the company acquired representation of several indie labels and publishing catalogues. Nelsson left the company shortly after the Handover of Hong Kong in 1997 to pursue Mainland China-related opportunities as a consultant.

He still enjoys singing and in mid-2005 started a new concept band, with the concept being that it can range in size from just Nelsson and a pianist up to as many musicians as a client can afford or accommodate on a stage. In view of this flexibility, he named the band INFINITY and the group has performed at many events including the 2005 Macau Grand Prix, the final New Year's Eve party at the legendary, now-closed, Hyatt Regency Hotel, the Canadian Community Ball (2004, 2005, 2006), the Jailhouse Rock party at the historical Victoria Prison to raise funds for the Community Chest and many private parties and events.

In September 2006 a Guangzhou, China-based record company released an album of Chinese favorites sung in English by Nelsson.

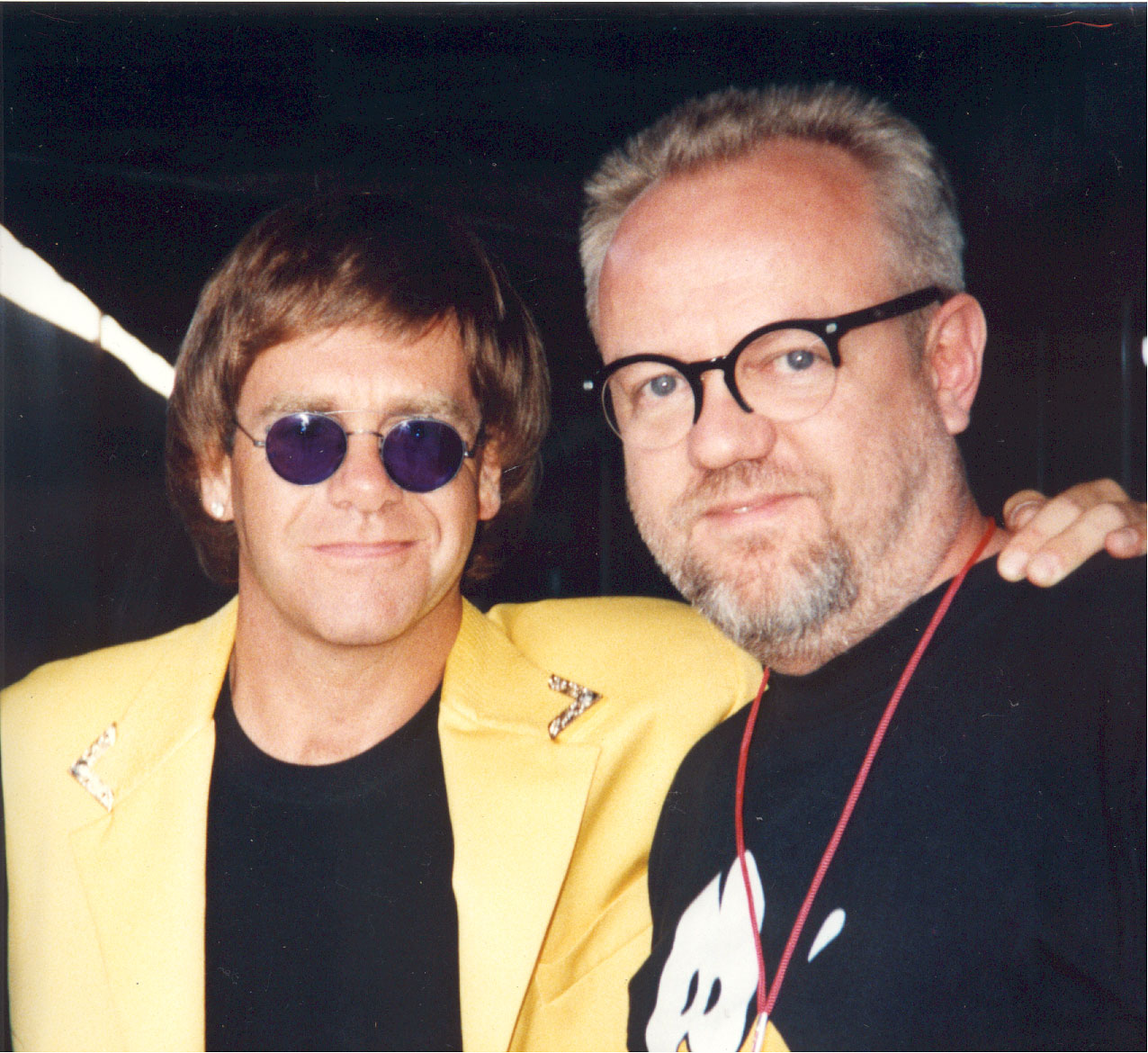
Elton John and Nelsson

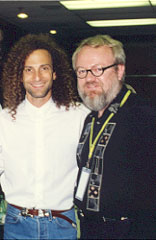
Kenny G and Nelsson

Over the decades Nelsson has also presented concerts by and booked major international artists such as Elton John, Bob Dylan, Kenny G, and Michael Bolton. He still books artists for corporate events and charity events.

== Acting ==
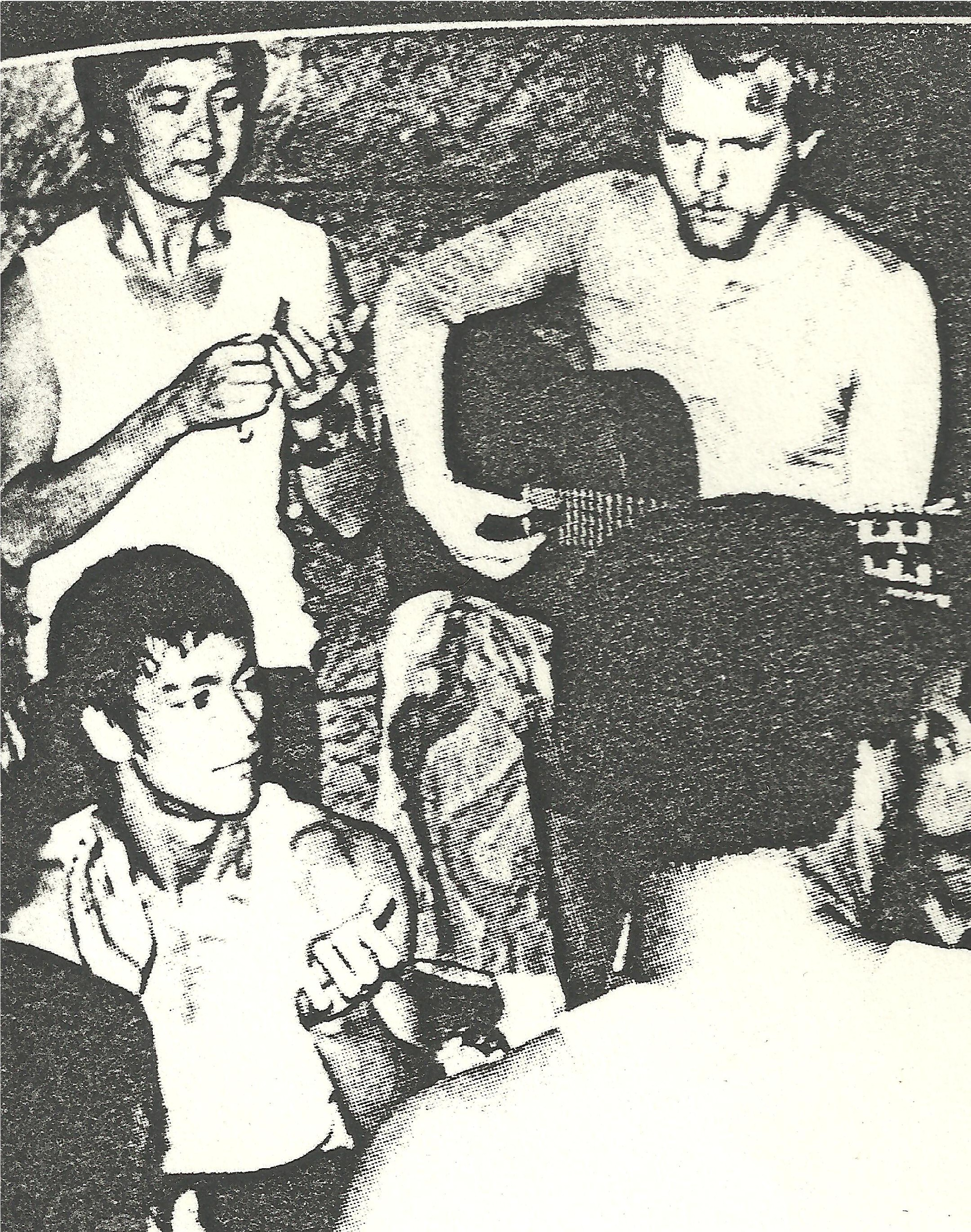
Bruce Lee and Nelsson

His acting career started with a small role in Bruce Lee's The Way of the Dragon. in 1972. He got the part as a result of knowing Lee via his brother Robert Lee who was a fellow musician. He has appeared in countless Hong Kong-made TV dramas since then, for all the Hong Kong channels, CTV, RTHK, HK-TVB and RTV/ATV.

Among his roles have been Divine Retribution (ATV), Wiselee (TVB) and feature film Journey To The West with Nicholas Tse, released in late 2005. During late 2005 and early 2006 he taped several drama serials for HK-TVB including Stanley Story, which went on air on May 15, 2006 and Land of Wealth, which was screened in October 2006. He has also appeared as a guest in Jade Solid Gold and is currently seen as an expert promoting HK-TVB's HD-TV channels. He finds that having his face appear on TV on a regular basis opens many doors, especially in China, and keeps this aspect of his career as a business tool as well as hobby.

== Other business interests ==
He is currently an entertainment industry and PR consultant doing work for Asian companies, including some of the major record companies, Hong Kong's popular restaurant and bar district Knutsford Terrace, and his native country of Sweden, through his group of companies, which include a music production company, a music publishing company and a PR company.

Nelsson is considered somewhat of an expert in music-related copyright matters and in a more serious side to his career has been engaged by the Hong Kong government as an expert witness from time to time. He has in the past served several terms as a director on the boards of both the Music Publishers Association (M.P.A.) and The Composers and Authors Society of Hong Kong (C.A.S.H.)

== Personal life ==
Nelsson has been married to Lau Kwai-Mui since 1978.

== Honors and awards ==
(Philippines) Order of the Knights of Rizal - (October 25, 2019).

== Solo discography ==
- 2011 Hong Kong Muzikland of the 60/70s 101
- 2006 Spirit of Respect
- 1986 Rock Remix (LP, Mixed
- 1978 The Tattoo Connection OST

== Filmography ==
=== Film ===
- 2017 Chasing the Dragon
- 2010 Bruce Lee, My Brother
- 2016 iGirl mung ching yan
- 1999 Century Hero
- 1992 Once Upon A Time A Hero in China
- 1990 Perfect Girls
- 1989 Mr. Canton and Lady Rose
- 1988 The Story of Hay Bo
- 1988 Gong zi duo qing/The Greatest Lover
- 1986 Goodbye My Hero/Goodbye My Love
- 1986 Lucky Stars Go Places
- 1986 The Seventh Curse
- 1983 All the Wrong Spies
- 1976 Bruce Lee: The Man, The Myth
- 1972 The Way of the Dragon

=== Composer ===
- He's a Legend; He's a Hero (1976)
- The Tattoo Connection (1978)
- Marianna (1982)
- My Darling, My Goddess (1982)
- To Hell with the Devil (1982)
- Heroes Three (1983)
- Somewhere My Love (1984)
- Mr. Vampire (1985)
- Twinkle, Twinkle, Lucky Stars (1985)
- My Name Ain't Suzie (1985)
- Rocky’s Love Affairs (1985)
- Those Merry Souls (1985)
- The Millionaires Express (1986)
- Mr. Vampire II (1986)
- The First Vampire in China (1986)
- Love Me Vampire (1986)
- Return of the Demon (1987)
- Mr. Vampire Part 3 (1987)
- The Haunted Cop Shop (1987)
- The Seductress (1987)
- Scared Stiff (1987)
- Goodbye Darling (1987)
- Seven Years Itch (1987)
- My Cousin The Ghost (1987)
- Chaos by Design (1988)
- Miss Magic (1988)
- Who is The Craftiest (1988)
- What a Small World (1989)
- Burning Sensation (1989)
- Vampire vs Vampire (1989)
- Vampire Buster (1989)
- Mr. Vampire 1992 (1992)

=== Television ===
- Goodbye Victoria Peak (1981)
- Goodbye Victoria Peak II (1981)
- Soldier of Fortun/Heung Sing Long Ji (1982)
- The Final Verdict II (1983)
- Young Dowager (1983)
- Legend of Ms. Choi Kam Fa (1988)
- Bandits from Hong Kong (1988)
- Sai gei chi chin/Divine Retribution (2000)
- Virtues of Harmony (2002)
- Trimming Success (2006)
- The Drive of Life / The Legendary Era (2007)
- Ghetto Justice II (2012)
- Silver Spoon, Sterling Shackles(2012)
- Highs and Lows (2012)
- Smooth Talker (2015)
- Blue Veins (2016)
- Phoenix Rising (2017)
- Daddy Cool (2018)
- OMG, Your Honour (2018)

== Websites ==
- Anders Nelsson at IMDb
