= Hong Kong English pop =

English-language songs performed in Hong Kong

Hong Kong English pop (Chinese: 香港英文歌) is a genre of music consisting of English-language songs that are made, performed and popularised in Hong Kong. It is known as simply English pop by Hong Kongers. The height of the English pop era in Hong Kong was from the 1950s to mid-1970s.

== History ==
As English was the only official language from 1843 to 1974 in Hong Kong, it was spoken widely, especially in formal contexts, by Hongkongers in the 20th century. As a result, pop songs performed in English language were very popular among both ethnic Chinese and British Hong Kong citizens.

=== Pre-WWII ===
Many of the bandleaders and musicians were Filipinos. Lobing Samson, who led the house band at Ciro's in Shanghai, China for many years, later made his way to Hong Kong as did Fred Carpio, Vic Cristobal and many others.

=== 1950s ===
In 1951, Frankie Laine recorded "Rose, Rose, I Love You" in Hong Kong, which is an English version of the popular Chinese song Mei gui mei gui wo ai ni composed by Chen Gexin (陳歌辛), and first recorded by Yao Lee in Shanghai 1940s. In 1959 Tsai Chin recorded an English version of Yao Min's "The Second Spring", which featured in the London stage musical The World of Suzie Wong.

=== 1960s ===
Imported pop music in English language from the West such as The Beatles, Elvis Presley and Johnny Mathis enjoyed much popularity in the city. Inspired by Western pop, Hong Kong artists started to produce Hong Kong's own pop music in English in the 1960s. The Kontinentals, a schoolboy band originating at King George V School, is often credited with being the first Hong Kong band to record original compositions in the style of British pop of the early 1960s. Lead singer and bassist Anders Nelsson and lead guitarist Roy Davenport, composed I Still Love You and I Think of Her, respectively, and the songs were chart-topping hits on the indie Orbit Records label owned by British jazz singer Gery Scott.

Prior to this most English-language recordings in the British Colony had been covers and with a few exceptions this trend continued through the 1960s. Nelsson continued as a singer songwriter with subsequent bands on the Diamond Music label and hits included Out of Sight, Out of Mind, Missing You and How Do You Do. Nelsson resurfaced in the early 1970s with a band called Ming which recorded mostly his own compositions, including Reasons Why, Never Coming Home and U 'n I. After the band broke up in 1976, Nelsson joined the label as a producer, eventually working his way up to manager at A&R. He left three years later to start his own company which managed and produced artists such as Louie Castro and Rowena Cortes, recording both in English and Cantonese. Teddy Robin and his band Teddy Robin and the Playboys (biggest hits Lies and You Can't Grow Peaches on a Cherry Tree), Joe Junior with his band The Side-Effects (biggest hits Here's A Heart, Letter To Susan) and Irene Ryder were some of the successful artists. They mostly came to fame in the latter half of the 1960s. DJ 'Uncle' Ray Cordeiro of local government station RTHK's Radio 3 English-language service is credited with heavily promoting and nurturing Hong Kong's English-language pop scene, and the same station's Chinese channels also featured a programme called 'Listen to song, learn English', which also enhanced the popularity of the genre. Such programmes have been credited for the high standard of spoken English in the 1960s and 1970s in Hong Kong.

Other Hong Kong English Pop artists include Judi Jim (詹小屏), D'Topnotes- 3 of their members include lead singer and bass player Christine Samson, drummer Michael Samson, singer Vikki Samson (the children of bandleader Lobing Samson), Michael Remedios and The Mystics, Danny Diaz & The Checkmates. Based in hotels and ballrooms, Hong Kong nightclubs featured both Filipino and Chinese dance bands often fronted by local female singers. At the upper end of the market, Rebecca Pan, Mona Fong (方逸華) and Kiang Ling (江玲) became well known for their mixed Mandarin and English repertoires. Diamond Records also became an independent HK label established in 1960, issuing albums in Mandarin and English originals. Pathé Records (Hong Kong) followed suit with a series of albums on the Columbia and Pathé labels by Chang Loo (張露), Betty Chung (鍾玲玲), Billie Tam (蓓蕾), Judy Jim (詹小屏) and Irene Ryder. And in 1968, Paul Leung (梁寶耳) produced one of the more notable bilingual albums of the 1960s.

Other bands include Giancarlo and his Italian Combo, The Corsairs, The Reynettes and The Fabulous Echoes, Mystics, the Zoundcrackers, the Downbeats, and the Side Effects, Mod East, Sons of Han, The Menace, Anders Nelsson, the Inspirations, The Menace and Joe Chen, The Black Jacks, The Quests (Mr. Rainbow) as well as folk songs by artists including Buddy Wong, the Willows, the Nautics, The Living Set, The Swinging Monstrels, The Young Men, the Gabriels. The Thunderbirds by Robert Lee.

=== 1970s ===
English-language pop imports remained very popular in the territory. Locally, Wynners, Roman and the Four Steps, Rowena Cortes, Teresa Carpio, Frances Yip, Albert Au, Chelsia Chan, Agnes Chan, Chopstick Sisters with Sandra Lang and Lotus featuring Samuel Hui, and Ming, a band formed by Anders Nelsson and recording his compositions, were some of the notable examples. Other artists who performed in English include Maria Cordero, Gracie Rivera, The Young Men, etc.

A Midsummer Night Festival concert at City Hall featured a mixed line-up of English and Mandarin acts, with tickets ranging from HK$10–20 featuring Mike Remedios, The Ripples, Chin Wai (秦淮), Joe Chen (陳任), William Chan (陳威廉), Peter Chan (陳浩德), Ko Siu-Hung (高小紅), Paula Tsui, Elaine Sun (孫泳恩), Stella Chee (奚秀蘭), Fung Wai-tong (馮偉棠), Shu Ya Chung (舒雅頌), Derek Cheng (張皓暉), Pau Lap (鮑立), Annie Chung (鍾安妮), Jennie Chung (鍾珍妮), all accompanied by Celso Cristobal and His Jacks. Annie Chung (鍾安妮), and Jennie Chung (鍾珍妮), also known as Chung Sisters, were mainstays on TVB and EYT.

=== 1980s ===
The rise of Cantopop drew some English-language pop singers to Cantopop in 1980s, such as Rowena Cortes, Kenny Bee and Alan Tam of The Wynners, Roman Tam of Roman and the Four Steps. Beyond, formed in 1983 and later achieved decades long unparalleled success in Hong Kong, released some of their early works in English, such as"Long Way Without Friends" and "Myth". The Citybeat was formed in the 1980s and achieved brief moderate success before moving to Cantopop.

=== 2000s and 2010s ===
In the 21st century, pop music in English language remains popular among Hongkongers, second only to C-pop. While most Hong Kong artists now sing primarily in Cantonese, it remains common for Hong Kong artists to include English tracks in their albums. Some artists produce more English works than others. Artists who produced substantial works in English include Wakin Chau, Chet Lam, Janice Vidal, The Pancakes, Ghost Style, etc.

Kelly Chen released the English language single Lover's Concerto in 1998, which became popular in South Korea in 1999. Jacky Cheung released English album Touch of Love in 2000. Teresa Carpio collaborated with the Hong Kong Philharmonic Orchestra in 2003, performed series of concerts and released a double disk English album.

Other artists who are fluent in English include Janice Vidal, Jill Vidal, Kelly Chen, Karen Joy Morris, Astor Fong, Fiona Sit, Edison Chen, Justin Lo, Kary Ng, Stephanie Cheng, Julio Acconci and Dino Acconci of Soler.

Notably, there has been a revival of the use of the English language in the indie and alternative scenes, the language of choice among bands such as Innisfallen, Hard Candy, 22 Cats, My Little Airport, Audiotraffic, Chochukmo etc. Indie Singer-songwriters who extensively write English lyrics have also emerged, such as Jabin Law, Tomii Chan, Wong Jing, among others. Some of them use English as a way to express themselves more fully, while sometimes also expressing a sense of rebellion or sophistication over the Cantonese dominated mainstream music in Hong Kong.

There is a surge in popularity with Hong Kong singers releasing audiophile CDs in English. The popular audiophile singers include Astor Fong, Susan Wong, Anders Nelsson and Mimi Lo. These audiophile CDs are mostly covers of jazz numbers or easy listening standards. Concerts and club gigs featuring Anders Nelsson, Teresa Carpio, Joe Junior and other singers from the 1960s and 1970s performing in English have been well attended. Some of these performances have been nostalgia concerts featuring hits from those decades but the trend is towards adding jazz and swing standards and rearranged versions of old hits to reflect the international popularity of light jazz.

One of the new Hong Kong's English Pop Stars to rise to fandom is rapper and Hong Kong local Lucas Scibetta, oft referred to by his compatriots and fellow gangbangers as "SkiBs the Kid". His rise to fame followed the release of his hit single Hong Kong Kids, a beat-heavy anthem calling the children of Hong Kong to unite and "give it up" because they "don't give a f***".

Meanwhile, some local musicians in Hong Kong seek to connect with the outside world, collaborating with musicians from countries of the Western world. In 2019, local female singer-songwriter Gin Lee collaborated with Italian singer Eros Ramazzotti, releasing an English-Italian single "Vale per sempre". Local electronic music producer Zight collaborated with American singer Chris Willis and Italian DJ duo Maximals, publishing their single "Work It Harder" for the British music chart.

=== 2020s ===
Since the 2020s, many new musicians who focused on English pop songs have emerged in Hong Kong. In the R&B scene, local R&B singers including Tyson Yoshi and Gareth.T have held 4 sold-out concerts respectively at Star Hall of KITEC. New R&B singer-songwriters including Kiri T, Moon Tang, Kayan9896 have contributed to its latest iteration.

On the other hand, local EDM (electronic dance music) producers and songwriters including VAL of local girl group STRAYZ, XTIE and Zight attempted to break into the Western music scene, exploring the boundaries of electronic music and digital instrumental technologies. Local alternative rock & pop rock musicians including WHIZZ and Mansonvibes continue to craft their unique styles of English rock music. Local Cantopop musicians including Joyce Cheng, Jay Fung, MC Cheung and AGA have also released a few English versions of their Cantonese singles. Group COLLAR and MIRROR release English song "Take Me Away" and "Rumours" respectively in 2023.

== See also ==
- Music of Hong Kong
- Cantopop
- Languages of Hong Kong
