= Susan Wong =

Hong Kong easy listening and singer

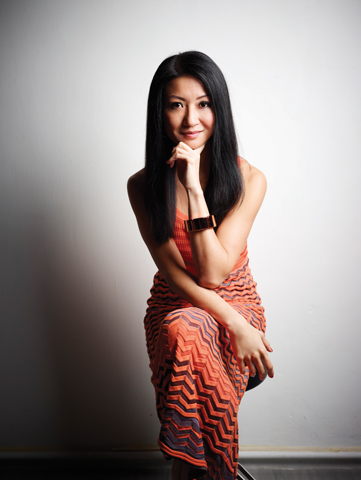
- Born: 1979 (age 46–47); Hong Kong
- Occupation: Singer
- Years active: 1996–1997, 2002–present

Chinese name
- Traditional Chinese: 黃翠珊
- Simplified Chinese: 黄翠珊
Transcriptions
Standard Mandarin
- Hanyu Pinyin: Huáng Cuì Shān
Yue: Cantonese
- Jyutping: Wong Chui Shan
- Musical career
- Genres: Bossa nova; easy listening; smooth jazz; country; folk; Cantopop; Hong Kong English pop
- Instrument: Piano
- Labels: Rock In Music (1996–1997, 2001–2006); Evosound (2007–)
- Website: http://susanwong.net

Susan Wong (born 1979) is a Chinese easy listening and smooth jazz singer, known for her alto vocals.

== Life and career ==
Wong was born in Hong Kong, and immigrated to Sydney, Australia with her family at the age of seven. Musically inclined from a young age, she learned to play the piano at age five and later she also learned the violin. At Kambala in Sydney, she sang alto in the choir and appeared in the school dramas (Gilbert & Sullivan and the like) and entered a number of piano competitions. She received an associate diploma (ATCL) in piano from Trinity College London.

Her first break in the music world was at the age of sixteen when her parents entered her for a singing contest in Sydney. It was organized by TVB with the winner to be offered a recording contract with one of the big music companies in Hong Kong. She won the competition and went to Hong Kong, where she met with the TVB producers who wanted her to sign with one of the music labels. After much deliberation she decided that a music career wasn’t right for her at that time and instead returned to Australia to study at University.

After graduating from university, she returned to Hong Kong in 1997 to help run her family’s accounting business; at this time, she gained her CPA certification. One of her students, who she was teaching piano, was working for a Hong Kong independent label, and Wong asked the boss if they wanted a singer. Wong started recording her favourite English songs and made the album Close To You (2002).

In early 2007, Susan Wong signed a new recording agreement with Hong Kong-based Evolution Music Group and released her first album under evosound in August 2007.

The first release under this agreement, Someone Like You, was recorded in Nashville, USA and won critical and commercial success throughout South East Asia.

Wong recorded her second album, 511, for the evosound label in Geneva Switzerland with producer Adrien Zerbini. It contained bossa nova influenced versions of songs such as Michael Jackson’s "Billie Jean" and "Everytime You Go Away" by Hall & Oates. "Billie Jean" received extensive airplay throughout South East Asia and a version on YouTube received over 450,000 views.

Returning to Geneva in 2010, Wong started work again with producer Adrien Zerbini along with guitarist Ignacio Lamas. The recordings mostly concentrated on sparse acoustic new interpretations of classic pop songs from the late 1960s and early 1970s including "California Dreamin'", "The Sound of Silence" and "Have You Ever Seen the Rain?". The "studio master" download of the album peaked at No. 1 on the Linn Records "studio master" download chart and spent over six months in the Top 10.

Five years on from her first visit Susan Wong returned to Nashville to record at Ocean Way Studio. The live in the studio project My Live Stories was released on CD, SACD, and HQCD in December 2012 with the live DVD/Blu-ray released in 2013.

In 2014, Wong released her fifth studio album, Woman in Love, which is a tribute to great female ballad singers.

== Discography ==
Studio albums

- 2002: Close To You
- 2004: I Wish You Love
- 2005: These Foolish Things
- 2005: Just A Little Bossa Nova
- 2006: A Night At The Movies
- 2007: Someone Like You
- 2009: 511
- 2010: Step Into My Dreams
- 2012: My Live Stories
- 2014: Woman In Love
- 2019: Close to Me
- 2024: Kamereon

Others albums

- 2006: My Choice
- 2008: The Best Of
- 2020: Christmas Love To You EP
