= Enjoy Yourself Tonight =

Hong Kong television series

- Some of the cast members
- 歡樂今宵
- Created by: Robert Chua
- Country of origin: Hong Kong
- No. of episodes: 6615

Production
- Running time: 1 hr 30 mins per episode (started as 1 hr show and at one stage went up to 1 hr 45 mins per episode)

Original release
- Network: TVB Jade
- Release: 20 November 1967 – 7 October 1994

Enjoy Yourself Tonight or EYT is a popular variety show that was produced in British Hong Kong. It first aired on TVB Jade on 20 November 1967. The show lasted 27 years with its last broadcast on Friday, 7 October 1994. During the 1980s, it was compared with the American Saturday Night Live as one of the world's longest-running live-shows.

== History ==
Enjoy Yourself Tonight was created by Robert Chua in 1967, when he was 21 years old. At that time the first General Manager of TVB, Australian Colin Bednall, wished to create a variety show in a format similar to In Melbourne Tonight. Chua was given the task of creating such a show, and after spending five months observing the popular culture and everyday lives in Hong Kong, Enjoy Yourself Tonight made its premiere, and gaining huge popularity.

The show aired from 9:30pm to 11:00pm every weeknight, sometimes including Saturdays. The show included singing, dancing, short dramas and variety show games that interacted with the audiences.

The show was one of the first shows ever to be broadcast in color in Hong Kong on 20 November 1967.

In the 1970s, one of the earliest musical group to perform in the show was the Four Golden Flowers. Lydia "Fei-fei" Shum would become one of the most notable MCs who became the symbol for the show. Another tradition of the show was for the entire cast to congregate at the end of each show to sing the "Good Night Song", written by Joseph Koo, which was one of only 2 songs where Koo was also the lyricist (the other being The Song of 1-10 for children). These, along with the show's opening theme song (a cover version of the chorus to "Enjoy Yourself (It's Later than You Think)" in Cantonese), have since attained iconic status within the popular culture of Hong Kong. Many Hong Kong English bands and singers performed on EYT during the 1970s, such as Agnes Chan, The Young Men and the Lotus.

By 1989 Enjoy Yourself Tonight had suffered a terminal decline in audience number; despite (or perhaps because of) a radical change in format (which saw weeknight programmes reduced to half-hour durations, plus the traditional full-length variety shows on Saturdays) including the use of a new theme song in the tune of the original which debuted in 1991. It failed to retain viewers, who by then had developed new tastes and had access to new forms of entertainment. As a result, the show ended its 27-year run in October 1994. To this day, however, TVB does not admit that Enjoy Yourself Tonight has ended its run. They merely said that if the show was to be canceled, a Farewell/Curtain Call edition will be produced and aired. As of 2007, no such edition was known to exist.

Since then there has been several attempts to resurrect Enjoy Yourself Tonight as a once-a-week programme, first in 1997, then from 2002 to 2004; neither of which were successful.

In 2007, to celebrate the 40th Anniversary of TVB, a half-hour weekday program known as Enjoy Yourself Tonight 2007 was run from 22 October to 16 November. As the Chinese title (再會歡樂今宵, literally "EYT Revisited") suggest, it was a re-run of some of the most memorable moments of the original EYT shows, as well as bringing back some of the original casts involved for guest appearances/interviews. In addition, the original theme song was brought back. Even though the latest program was merely a nostalgic looking back to EYT's former glory, it nonetheless bore testimony to the show's lasting legacy to Hong Kong's popular culture.

== See also ==
- List of television programmes broadcast by TVB
- In Melbourne Tonight
- Saturday Night Live
- Sábado Gigante
- Enjoy Yourself (It's Later than You Think) EYT used a Chinese language arrangement of this song as its theme song
