= BeatStars =

Music licensing company

- BeatStars logo
- Company type: Music licensing
- Industry: Music
- Founded: 2008
- Founder: Abe Batshon

BeatStars is a global subscription-based music licensing platform where recording artists and producers collaborate, license and distribute their work to multiple parties through a variety of non-exclusive and exclusive license types. Founder Abe Batshon formed the BeatStars model to make his own music before launching it as a business in 2008.

== History ==
The founder, Abe Batshon grew up in the East Bay area, in San Francisco, in the United States and was introduced to hip-hop from an early age. As a songwriter in mid-1990s AOL chatrooms, unable to afford the high prices attached to purchasing beats from producers, he proposed paying less than the sale price, under the condition the producer could sell the same beat to others. Years later, this concept of leasing non-exclusive work to multiple clients formed the basis of BeatStars.

Batshon started building BeatStars in 2008. It began as a hip-hop site but now includes all genres of music.

== Business model ==
Based in Austin, Texas and launched in 2008, BeatStars is a subscription-based online music marketplace where recording artists and producers can collaborate, lease and distribute their music to multiple clients through non-exclusive licenses. It operates as a platform for producers and artists to create works together. BeatStars has both free and paying subscription models in operation. Licenses can be customized by sellers, the most common transaction is the non-exclusive production license where the licensee controls the master of their version. The producers usually control publishing administration, deciding on terms and price, and the producer and songwriter equally split the writers share. BeatStars also offers collaborator splits, which enables users to add collaborators to their works and automatically split the revenue with them on their release. Products include Free, Marketplace and Pro Page plans, and various tools that work across the platform such as the Blaze Player (a tool for playing and buying music) and Beat ID (a music identification tool).

In 2020 BeatStars formed BeatStars Publishing, a partnership with Sony Music Publishing, open to any independent songwriters and producers, which provides a global online administration service allowing users to register their songs and collect publishing administration royalties.

== Impact ==
In 2019, the rapper Lil Nas X used a beat purchased from producer YoungKio on BeatStars in their country/trap fusion track "Old Town Road", which went on to break records by spending 19 weeks at number one on the Billboard Hot 100. The platform did come under fire, however, due to the fact that the track sampled a Nine Inch Nails song without permission. The track remained on the website for a year before the infringement was detected.

BeatStars and other similar online music services have helped to democratize the hip-hop, and music, landscape, as well as popularizing the use of type beats in music production- where producers tag artist likeness onto their music to engage search engine optimization.

In 2021. BeatStars was featured in Fast Company's list of the top ten most innovative music companies of the year.
