= Demigod (disambiguation) =

A demigod is a half human and half godlike being.

Demigod may also refer to:

== Music ==
- Demigod (band), a Finnish death metal band
- Demigod (album), an album by the band Behemoth
- "Demigod", a song from Demonic Art by Darkane
- Demigodz, an underground hip-hop super group which originated in Connecticut

== Television ==
- Demi-Gods and Semi-Devils (1982 TV series)
- Demi-Gods and Semi-Devils (1997 TV series)
- Demi-Gods and Semi-Devils (2003 TV series)
- Legend of the Demigods

== Literature ==
- Demi-Gods and Semi-Devils, a novel by Jin Yong
- Characters in Percy Jackson & the Olympians

== Video games ==
- Demigod (video game), a 2009 real time strategy computer game
