= List of Demi-Gods and Semi-Devils characters =

List of characters from the novel Demi-Gods and Semi-Devils by Jin Yong

The following is a list of characters from the wuxia novel Demi-Gods and Semi-Devils by Jin Yong. There are over 230 characters in the novel, including those who are only mentioned by name. Some characters such as Duan Yu, Duan Zhengchun, Duan Zhengming, Gao Shengtai, Yelü Hongji and Wanyan Aguda are fictionalised personas of historical figures, while the rest are fictional characters.

== Main characters ==
- Qiao Feng (喬峰), birth name Xiao Feng (蕭峰). See Demi-Gods and Semi-Devils#Qiao Feng's story.
- Duan Yu (段譽). See Demi-Gods and Semi-Devils#Duan Yu's story.
- Xuzhu (虛竹). See Demi-Gods and Semi-Devils#Xuzhu's story.
- Wang Yuyan (王語嫣) is Duan Zhengchun and Li Qingluo's daughter who is described as a beautiful, intelligent and flawless young maiden independent of all worldly traits. As she has a crush on her cousin, Murong Fu, she memorises martial arts manuals in the hope of providing him guidance on perfecting his skills and hence win his affection. However, he neither appreciates her help nor reciprocates her feelings towards him. Although she does not practise martial arts herself, she is able to identify many forms of martial arts simply by observation. Duan Yu falls in love with her at first sight due to her resemblance to "Fairy Sister", a statue of her maternal grandaunt he once chanced upon, and starts following her wherever she goes. Although she is initially impassive towards Duan Yu, she warms up to him after he saves her on a few occasions. Towards the end of the novel, Murong Fu tells her that he wants to fight for the hand-in-marriage of the Western Xia princess so that he can form an alliance with Western Xia to help him restore the Yan kingdom. She feels so dejected upon hearing that and attempts suicide but survives. Duan Yu confronts Murong Fu and tells him he will also fight for the princess's hand-in-marriage, so as to force Murong Fu to choose Wang Yuyan. Murong Fu turns furious and knocks Duan Yu into a well. By then, Wang Yuyan realises that Murong Fu has no feelings for her so she throws herself into the well in despair to join Duan Yu. Both of them survive the fall, pledge their love to each other, and eventually leave safely. Wang Yuyan discovers later that she is Duan Zhengchun's daughter – effectively making her Duan Yu's half-sister – and feels heartbroken because she cannot be with Duan Yu anymore. Duan Yu later tells her that they can still be together because they are ultimately distant cousins since his biological father turns out to be Duan Yanqing instead of Duan Zhengchun. In the 2012 edition of the novel, Duan Yu realises that the love he has for Wang Yuyan was actually the love that he has for the Fairy Sister statue and eventually lets her go.
- Azhu (阿朱) is Duan Zhengchun and Ruan Xingzhu's elder daughter who is highly skilled in the art of disguise. First appearing as a servant of the Murong family, she and Abi help Duan Yu escape from Jiumozhi. She once disguised Duan Yu and herself as Murong Fu and Qiao Feng respectively as part of a plan to save the Beggar Clan members captured by Western Xia soldiers. She later disguises herself as a monk and infiltrates Shaolin to steal the Yijin Jing for Murong Fu. Qiao Feng witnesses the act and forces her to hide with him behind a giant statue, but they are discovered by the monks. In the ensuing fight, she is injured by Xuanci, but Qiao Feng saves her and they escape. When inspecting her wounds, he finds out that she is a woman and uses his neigong to preserve her life and cares for her while she is wounded. During this time, Azhu develops romantic feelings for Qiao Feng. Qiao Feng brings her to Xue Muhua and manages to convince the physician to heal her. After recovering, Azhu waits for Qiao Feng for five days and five nights at Yanmen Pass and tells him she wishes to accompany him forever. Qiao Feng, thereafter renamed to Xiao Feng, is touched by her dedication and reciprocates her feelings for him. Although they enjoy a happy and peaceful time together, Xiao Feng insists on finding out the identity of "Leading Big Brother" so Azhu offers to help him trick Kang Min into revealing who "Leading Big Brother" is by disguising herself as Bai Shijing. However, Kang Min, who had a secret affair with Bai Shijing, quickly sees through Azhu's disguise and lies to her that "Leading Big Brother" is Duan Zhengchun. Xiao Feng challenges Duan Zhengchun to a duel. Before the duel, Azhu finds out that Duan Zhengchun is her father and Azi is her sister. She disguises herself as Duan Zhengchun to prevent a conflict between her lover and her father, and allows Xiao Feng to kill her. It is too late when Xiao Feng realises his mistake. Before dying, Azhu reveals the truth to Xiao Feng and makes him promise to take good care of Azi. She then dies in Xiao Feng's arms and is buried in the backyard of Ruan Xingzhu's home.
- Azi (阿紫) is Azhu's younger sister and one of Ding Chunqiu's apprentices. Like many in the Xingxiu Sect, she is sadistic and cruel, taking pleasure in torturing anyone who offends her. As she had stolen the Divine Wood Royal Cauldron (神木王鼎), a prized treasure of the Xingxiu Sect, and fled with it, she is considered a traitor of the sect. In the 2012 edition of the novel, her reason for doing so was because Ding Chunqiu noticed her growing beauty and started making sexual advances on her even though she was around 16 years old and he was at least 60. You Tanzhi, who is also attracted by her beauty, willingly succumbs to her sadistic "games" to amuse her. At one point, after Ding Chunqiu blinds Azi, You Tanzhi saves her and later even offers his eyes for an eye transplant operation to help her regain her sense of sight. Yet, she does not care about him and despises him even more. She has a crush on Xiao Feng, even after he makes it clear to her that he will love no other woman except Azhu. She often taunts Xiao Feng with her sister's dying words whenever he refuses to do anything for her. When Xiao Feng refuses to help the Liao Empire attack the Song Empire, the Liao emperor sends his concubine to trick Azi into spiking Xiao Feng's wine with a "love potion". While escaping from Liao territory with Azi, Xiao Feng suddenly collapses because the "love potion" is a poison that will temporarily weaken him. While Xiao Feng is captured and imprisoned by Liao forces, Azi manages to escape and seek help from Duan Yu, Xuzhu and others to save him. Although Xiao Feng is rescued, he takes the Liao emperor hostage and commits suicide after forcing the emperor to make an oath. Azi realises with despair that she cannot live without Xiao Feng and follows suit after he takes his own life.
- Mu Wanqing (木婉清) is Duan Zhengchun and Qin Hongmian's daughter. Her mother single-handedly raised her and forced her to make a vow: if any man sees her face, she must either marry or kill him. As such, she normally wears a mask or veil. She is pursued by Yue Laosan, who is angry that she killed his apprentice Sun Sanba, and meets Duan Yu by chance. Despite her harsh treatment towards him, he tries to help her and she falls in love with him. When Yue Laosan catches up with them, she reveals her face to Duan Yu and forces him to either marry her or die with her. He chooses the former option. She leaves him in anguish after they are revealed to be actually half-siblings. She encounters Duan Yanqing, who tricks her and Duan Yu into consuming aphrodisiac because he wants them to commit incest and disgrace the Duan family. However, Duan Zhengchun's men dig a tunnel leading to the room where she is held captive, rescue her, and replace her with Zhong Ling. She appears again in a later chapter and disguises herself as Duan Yu to temporarily take his place during the contest for the Western Xia princess's hand-in-marriage. In the 2012 edition of the novel, Duan Yu reveals to some of his closest confidants including Mu Wanqing who his real biological father was. Simultaneously, he realises that the love he has Wang Yuyan was actually the love he has for the Fairy Sister statue and also realises that Mu Wanqing is the one that he truly loves and marries her. Mu Wangqing becomes the empress and Zhong Ling becomes the consort.
- Zhong Ling (鍾靈) is Duan Zhengchun and Gan Baobao's daughter. She first meets Duan Yu while he is attempting to dissuade the Limitless Sword Sect and Shennong Clan from fighting. Later, she is captured and held hostage by the Shennong Clan after her pet, the Lightning Mink (閃電貂), bites many of them. She is ultimately rescued by Duan Yu and Mu Wanqing in disguise as messengers from Lingjiu Palace. Although she is also in love with Duan Yu, she gives up after learning that he is her half-brother. She appears again in a later chapter to take care of Duan Yu after he is wounded by Jiumozhi.

== Dali Kingdom ==
The Duan family of Dali (大理段氏) is the royal family of the Dali Kingdom and a reputable martial arts clan in the wulin. They are known for using the "Yiyang Finger" (一陽指), which allows them to project streams of energy from their fingers. Some of its members are fictionalised personas of historical figures.

- Duan Zhengming (段正明) is the benevolent and highly respected ruler of Dali. When Jiumozhi shows up at Heavenly Dragon Monastery to force the monks to give him the "Six Meridians Divine Sword" manual, Duan Zhengming abdicates and becomes a monk at the monastery to help them deal with Jiumozhi. He is thereafter known as Benchen (本塵).
- Duan Zhengchun (段正淳) is Duan Zhengming's younger brother. Notorious for his philandering ways, he conceives several illegitimate daughters with different women in his younger days. Ironically, three of his daughters become romantically involved with Duan Yu, whom he raises as his son. Duan Yu was actually conceived out of a past illicit affair between his wife, Dao Baifeng, and Duan Yanqing, his distant cousin and future nemesis. He succeeds his brother as the ruler of Dali after the latter abdicates and becomes a monk. While travelling around, he is confronted on different occasions by Duan Yanqing, who attempts to force him to hand over his throne. He commits suicide to join his lovers after they are killed by Murong Fu.
- Gao Shengtai (高升泰) is a marquis of Dali. He rules Dali as a regent after Duan Zhengchun's death before passing the reins of power to Duan Yu.
- Fan Hua (范驊), Ba Tianshi (巴天石) and Hua Hegen (華赫艮) are three highly-skilled martial artists serving as the Three Ducal Ministers in the Dali government.
- The Four Bodyguards (四大護衛) are four highly-skilled martial artists dedicated to protecting Duan Zhengchun and his family. They usually disguise themselves and accompany Duan Zhengchun when he travels around. Duan Zhengchun regards them as his friends rather than subordinates.
  - Chu Wanli (褚萬里) disguises himself as a fisherman. He is killed by Duan Yanqing.
  - Gu Ducheng (古篤誠) disguises himself as a woodcutter.
  - Fu Sigui (傅思歸 (Fù Sīguī)) disguises himself as a farmer.
  - Zhu Danchen (朱丹臣 (Zhū Dānchén)) disguises himself as a scholar. Duan Yu regards him as a close friend because both of them have common interests in literature and poetry.

== Murong family ==
The Murong family of Gusu (姑蘇慕容氏) descends from the royal families of the Yan kingdoms (Southern Yan, Former Yan, Later Yan, etc.) of the Sixteen Kingdoms era. They are known for their fighting style best described as "returning you with your own way" (以彼之道，還施彼身) because they like to use their opponents' own signature moves against them. Having attempted to master every known form of martial art in the wulin, they have amassed a wide collection of martial arts manuals over the years.

- Murong Fu (慕容復), nicknamed "Southern Murong", is the current head of the Murong family. His father named him "Fu" (literally "restore") to remind him to restore the Yan kingdom. An egoistic, scheming and ruthless man, he attempts all sorts of methods, including unscrupulous means, to revive his family's legacy. He is even willing to sever ties with his cousin Wang Yuyan, who has a crush on him, in order to realise his dream of becoming an emperor. He fails in his grand plan and becomes insane eventually. Although he has mastered numerous forms of martial arts like his father before him, he specialises in none and does not quite grasp the nuances in some of them.
- Murong Bo (慕容博), alias Yan Longyuan (燕龍淵), is Murong Fu's father. Like his son, he has the same dream of restoring the Yan kingdom. 30 years ago, he lied to Xuanci and other prominent wulin figures that the Khitans were planning to send a spy to infiltrate the Shaolin Sect and steal martial arts manuals from the library. They believed him and ambushed Xiao Yuanshan and his family at Yanmen Pass, resulting in the death of Xiao Yuanshan's wife. After this tragedy, Murong Bo faked his death and hid in Shaolin for many years, secretly learning martial arts from the manuals in the library. Eventually, he is forced to come out of hiding during the wulin gathering. Eventually, he realises how delusional he has been, and feels so grateful to the Sweeper Monk for saving him that he decides to be a monk for the rest of his life.
- Murong Fu has four followers who have loyally served his family for years. Towards the end of the novel, he kills Bao Butong after the latter expressly disapproves of him becoming Duan Yanqing's godson in order to win over Duan Yanqing as an ally. The other three abandon him after witnessing how he would willingly kill his own followers to fulfil his dream.
  - Deng Baichuan (鄧百川)
  - Gongye Gan (公冶乾) is nicknamed "Number Two in Jiangnan" (江南老二).
  - Bao Butong (包不同) is nicknamed "No, No" (非也非也) after his favourite catchphrase. He is notorious for disagreeing with people and making blunt criticisms, usually starting the conversation with "No, no".
  - Feng Bo'e (風波惡) is nicknamed "Gust of Wind" (一陣風). He is always ready to pick a fight with others even when his chances of winning are low.
- Abi (阿碧) is a servant of the Murong family and Kang Guangling's apprentice. She and Azhu helped Duan Yu escape from Jiumozhi. She is very loyal to Murong Fu and continues serving him even after he becomes insane.
- Bao Buliang (包不靚) is Bao Butong's daughter.

== Duan Zhengchun's lovers ==
- Dao Baifeng (刀白鳳) is Duan Zhengchun's wife. She left her husband after discovering his extramarital relations and decided to take revenge by cheating on him. She had a one-night stand with a filthy beggar, who was actually a critically wounded Duan Yanqing, and gave birth to Duan Yu later. She only reveals the truth to her son towards the end of the novel. In the 2012 edition of the novel, she points out to Duan Yu that he can marry all his cousins since the relations between him and them are so distant. She commits suicide soon after to join her dead husband.
- Qin Hongmian (秦紅棉) is nicknamed "Sura Dagger" (修羅刀). She left Duan Zhengchun after learning of his multiple affairs with other women and single-handedly raised their daughter, Mu Wanqing, whom she also trained in martial arts. Towards the end of the novel, Murong Fu tries to use her and Duan Zhengchun's other mistresses as hostages to force Duan Zhengchun to pass the throne to Duan Yanqing. When Duan Zhengchun refuses, Murong Fu kills Qin Hongmian, Gan Baobao, Ruan Xingzhu and Li Qingluo.
- Gan Baobao (甘寶寶) is Zhong Wanchou's wife. Her daughter, Zhong Ling, was conceived from a secret affair she had with Duan Zhengchun, and has been raised as Zhong Wanchou's daughter over the years. She first appears when Duan Yu comes to Wanjie Valley to seek help in rescuing Zhong Ling, who had been captured and held hostage by the Shennong Clan.
- Ruan Xingzhu (阮星竹) is the mother of Azhu and Azi. As she bore her daughters out of wedlock, she abandoned them to protect Duan Zhengchun's reputation. Later, by chance, she is reunited with her daughters but only manages to identify Azi; Azhu is killed by Xiao Feng by mistake before she can acknowledge her parents.
- Kang Min (康敏), also known as Madam Ma (馬夫人), is Ma Dayuan's wife and one of Duan Zhengchun's mistresses. She was attracted to Qiao Feng and had attempted to vie for his attention but he did not take notice of her. Feeling scorned, she plots his downfall after discovering the sealed letter about his Khitan heritage by chance. She seduces Bai Shijing and gets him to help her murder her husband while concurrently having another affair with Quan Guanqing, whom she instigates to incite the Beggar Clan elders to rebel against Qiao Feng. Later, she tricks Qiao Feng and Azhu into believing that "Leading Big Brother" is Duan Zhengchun, indirectly causing Azhu's tragic death. When Duan Zhengchun visits her later to find out why she directed Qiao Feng to kill him, she uses the opportunity to take revenge on him for betraying her love. She tricks him into consuming a potion that temporarily weakens him and tortures him until Bai Shijing shows up. When Bai Shijing wants to kill Duan Zhengchun to silence him, he ends up being killed by a masked Xiao Yuanshan. Kang Min ultimately finds herself at the mercy of Azi, who tortures and disfigures her in the name of avenging Azhu. She dies of shock after seeing her reflection in a mirror because she had prided herself on her beauty.

=== Mantuo Manor ===
- Li Qingluo (李青蘿), also known as Madam Wang (王夫人), is the owner of Mantuo Manor (曼陀山莊) on an island in Lake Tai. Her parents are Wuyazi and Li Qiushui; she is also Wang Yuyan's mother and Murong Fu's maternal aunt. After learning that Duan Zhengchun has cheated her feelings by having secret affairs with other women, she develops a hatred of men and sends her servants to kill every man who crosses her path. She prides herself on her island's camellia flowers, and makes an exception to her intolerance of men by allowing Duan Yu to stay in her manor as a caretaker for her flowers. She collaborates with Murong Fu and Duan Yanqing in an attempt to scare Duan Zhengchun and take revenge on him for betraying her love. However, she soon realises how far Murong Fu is willing to go in order to force Duan Zhengchun to give up his throne when her nephew starts killing Duan's mistresses one by one. Murong Fu soon points his sword at her after Duan expresses his love for her. In an attempt to save her, Duan lies to her that he hates her and will never love her because she caused his other lovers to die. Feeling despair, she throws herself on Murong Fu's sword to end her life. Just before she dies, Duan regrets and tells her that he still loves her.
- Li Qingluo has numerous servants, some of whom are also highly-skilled martial artists.
  - Granny Rui (瑞婆婆) and Granny Ping (平婆婆) are sent to hunt down and kill Qin Hongmian and Mu Wanqing after they attempted to assassinate Li Qingluo.
  - Yan Mama (嚴媽媽) is in charge of the fertiliser room in the manor.

== Four Evils ==
The "Four Evils" (天下四惡 / 四大惡人) are a group of four eccentric martial artists notorious for committing heinous crimes. Their nicknames are Chinese idioms used to describe evil persons. The four are ranked in order of seniority:

- Duan Yanqing (段延慶), nicknamed "Overflowing with Evil" (惡貫滿盈), is a distant cousin of Duan Zhengming and Duan Zhengchun, and a former crown prince of Dali. Duan Yanqing's father, the former ruler, was overthrown and killed in a rebellion. During the chaos, Duan Yanqing was critically wounded and became so crippled and disfigured that no one could recognise him. After the rebellion was suppressed, Duan Yanqing was presumed dead, so Duan Zhengming was crowned the new ruler. Feeling resentful that his right to become the ruler had been taken from him, Duan Yanqing plots his revenge and attempts to seize the throne by threatening and harming Duan Zhengchun and Duan Yu on different occasions. Although he appears to be a crippled old man on crutches, his mastery of the "Yiyang Finger" is extremely powerful. He has the ability to channel his neigong to his abdomen and speak without using his vocal cords. He gives up on his quest to reclaim the throne and becomes a recluse when he realises that his biological son, Duan Yu, will eventually become the ruler of Dali, thereby returning the royal lineage to his bloodline.
- Ye Erniang (葉二娘) is nicknamed "No Evil Left Undone" (無惡不作). She had a secret romance with Xuanci and they had a son, who was taken away from her by a masked attacker. She has depression and resorts to kidnapping other people's babies and treating them as her own before killing them. (In the 2012 edition of the novel, she leaves the babies at strangers' homes after playing with them.) At the wulin gathering at Shaolin, she recognises Xuzhu as her son after seeing the joss stick burn marks on his back and reunites with him. She dies together with Xuanci after he publicly confesses his affair with her.
- Yue Laosan (岳老三), nicknamed "Malevolent Deity and Evil Devil" (凶神惡煞), is also known as the "Crocodile Deity of the Southern Sea" (南海鱷神). He is the most comical character in the novel because of his repeated (but unsuccessful) attempts to make Duan Yu his apprentice, which concluded with him being outsmarted by Duan Yu and becoming Duan's apprentice (in name) instead. He often bickers with Ye Erniang and claims that he should be ranked second among the Four Evils, but concedes to her upon her death. Armed with a pair of giant scissors, he often threatens to kill people by breaking their necks. He is killed by Duan Yanqing while trying to save Duan Yu.
- Yun Zhonghe (雲中鶴), nicknamed "Thoroughly Cruel, Utterly Evil" (窮凶極惡), is a lecherous fiend who preys on young women. He is armed with an iron staff and relies on his formidable prowess in qinggong to pursue his targets and flee from danger. He is viciously killed by Duan Yu when he attempts to make sexual advances on Wang Yuyan after the deaths of Duan Zhengchun and his lovers.
- Tan Qing (譚青), nicknamed "Soul Chasing Staff" (追魂杖), is Duan Yanqing's apprentice. He is killed by Qiao Feng while attempting to disrupt the gathering at Heroes' Gathering Manor.
- Sun Sanba (孫三霸), nicknamed "Little Devil" (小煞神), was Yue Laosan's apprentice. He was killed by Mu Wanqing after he saw her face.

== Shaolin Sect ==
The Shaolin Sect, based in Shaolin Monastery on Mount Song, is headed by senior monks of the Xuan (玄) generation with the abbot at the helm. The Xuan generation is preceded by the Ling (靈) generation and followed by the Hui (慧), Xu (虛) and Kong (空) generations.

- Xuanci (玄慈) is the current abbot. In his younger days, he violated the Shaolin code of conduct by having a secret romance with Ye Erniang, with whom he had a son, Xuzhu, without his knowledge. Shortly after Xuzhu was born, Xiao Yuanshan kidnapped the baby from Ye Erniang and left him in the garden of Shaolin, where the monks found the baby and decided to raise him as one of them. Xuanci is actually the mysterious "Leading Big Brother" (帶頭大哥) who had led the attack on Xiao Yuanshan's family at Yanmen Pass several years ago after receiving misleading information from Murong Bo. He expressed remorse for his sins but could not find the courage to acknowledge that he was wrong. Towards the end of the novel, he publicly confesses his relationship with Ye Erniang and dies in peace after accepting punishment for his misconduct.
- The Sweeper Monk (掃地僧) is a nameless monk in charge of maintaining the library of Shaolin. Over the years, he has seen Murong Bo and Xiao Yuanshan hiding in the library and secretly learning Shaolin skills from the manuals, but they have never noticed him. During the final confrontation between Murong Bo and Xiao Yuanshan, the Sweeper Monk appears and points out how they have suffered grievous internal injuries over the years from attempting to master Shaolin skills without using Buddhist teachings as a guiding philosophy. He overpowers them, temporarily puts them to sleep, and heals them physically and mentally. When they regain consciousness, they realise how delusional they have been, and feel so grateful to be saved that they decide to become monks for the rest of their lives and practise Buddhism under the Sweeper Monk's guidance.
- Xuancheng (玄澄) was obsessed with trying to master all of Shaolin's 72 most powerful skills and he ended up sustaining grievous internal injuries and becoming permanently disabled. After this experience, he realised his past folly and dedicated the rest of his life to practising Buddhism. He is mentioned when the Sweeper Monk uses him as an example to warn Murong Bo, Xiao Yuanshan and Jiumozhi against attempting to master all the 72 skills without using Buddhist teachings as a guiding philosophy.
- Xuanbei (玄悲) travelled to Dali to help the Duan family when he heard that they were under attack by the "Four Evils". On the way, he was ambushed and murdered by Murong Bo in Luliangzhou.
- Xuanku (玄苦) trained Qiao Feng in martial arts before the latter joined the Beggar Clan. He is mortally wounded by Xiao Yuanshan. When Qiao Feng comes to visit him later, he mistakes Qiao Feng for Xiao Yuanshan because of the similarities in their appearances, and wrongly accuses Qiao Feng of attacking him before succumbing to his injuries.
- Xuannan (玄難) is the head of the Bodhidharma Hall, which oversees martial arts training in Shaolin. He is poisoned to death by Ding Chunqiu.
- Xuandu (玄渡) is defeated and injured by Jiumozhi when the latter comes to challenge Shaolin.
- Xuanji (玄寂) is the head of the Discipline Hall, which is in charge of maintaining order in Shaolin. He ultimately succeeds Xuanci as the abbot.
- Xuanyin (玄因), Xuansheng (玄生) and Xuanzhi (玄止) once joined Xuanci and Xuandu in disguising themselves to spar with Qiao Feng to find out if he was the one who killed Xuanku.
- Xuanshi (玄石) secretly followed Xiao Feng to find out if he was really the one who murdered Xu Chongxiao and the others. He is killed by Liao warriors while saving Xiao Feng from captivity.
- Xuanming (玄鳴) is killed by Liao warriors while saving Xiao Feng from captivity.
- Xuantong (玄痛) is injured by You Tanzhi's icy venom skill. While recovering, he suddenly attains enlightenment and dies.
- Lingmen (靈門) was the former Shaolin abbot.
- Other members of the Xuan generation include: Xuancan (玄慚), Xuankui (玄愧), Xuannian (玄念), Xuanjing (玄淨) and Xuanmie (玄滅).
- Huilun (慧輪) is Xuzhu's master.
- Huijing (慧凈) is a monk who catches the Ice Silkworm.
- Huizhen (慧真) and Huiguan (慧觀) are Xuanbei's apprentices who accompany him to Dali to assist the Duan family. After their master is murdered in Luliangzhou, they continue their journey to Dali and report their master's death to the Duan family.
- Huifang (慧方) and Huijing (慧鏡) accompany Xuannan to meet Su Xinghe.
- Xuqing (虛清), Xuzhan (虛湛) and Xuyuan (虛淵) are in charge of maintaining the Bodhi Hall, where the Yijin Jing is kept. Azhu disguises herself as Xuqing when she sneaks into Shaolin to steal the Yijin Jing.

== Beggar Clan ==
- Ma Dayuan (馬大元) is the clan's deputy chief. A humble man, he was entrusted with safekeeping a sealed letter containing information about Qiao Feng's origin, but has never opened it. His wife, Kang Min, seduces Bai Shijing and instigates him to murder her husband. Bai Shijing uses Ma Dayuan's signature move to kill him and attempts to push the blame to Murong Fu.
- Wang Jiantong (汪劍通), nicknamed "Sword Beard" (劍髯), was the former clan chief and one of those involved in the attack on Xiao Yuanshan's family at Yanmen Pass. He had died of natural causes before the events of the novel took place. However, before his death, he had passed a sealed letter containing information about Qiao Feng's origins to Ma Dayuan for safekeeping, and had given instructions that the letter can only be opened in the presence of the clan's elders if Ma dies under suspicious circumstances.
- The Four Senior Elders are incited by Quan Guanqing to rebel against Qiao Feng and remove him from his position as chief. Their plan fails and they have to take their own lives for rebelling against the chief. However, Qiao Feng pardons them on account of their past contributions to the clan.
  - Wu Changfeng (吳長風)
  - Chen Guyan (陳孤雁)
  - Xi Shanhe (奚山河) is regarded by Qiao Feng as a friend and a mentor. At Heroes' Gathering Manor, they drink to sever ties with each other; Qiao Feng kills him in the ensuing battle.
  - Elder Song (宋長老)
- Bai Shijing (白世鏡) is the elder in charge of maintaining discipline in the clan. He is seduced by Kang Min and instigated by her to murder Ma Dayuan. Later, just as he is about to kill Duan Zhengchun (who has been poisoned by Kang Min), a masked Xiao Yuanshan suddenly shows up and uses Ma Dayuan's signature move to kills him.
- Quan Guanqing (全冠清), nicknamed "All Rounded Scholar" (十方秀才), is a branch leader of the clan. He was seduced by Kang Min and instigated by her to incite the Four Senior Elders to rebel against Qiao Feng. Later, he meets You Tanzhi by chance and helps You become the new chief of the Beggar Clan with the intention of turning You into a puppet chief under his control. He also manipulates You Tanzhi into helping him get rid of his rivals within the Beggar Clan, and instigates You Tanzhi to issue a challenge to the Shaolin Sect for supremacy in the wulin. After You Tanzhi meets his downfall at the wulin gathering at Shaolin, Quan Guanqing attempts to escape but the Beggar Clan elders track him down and kill him.
- Xu Chongxiao (徐沖霄) is a retired elder who appears at the meeting in Apricot Forest to affirm that the contents of the letter about Qiao Feng's origin are genuine. Later, he was murdered by Xiao Yuanshan just before Qiao Feng comes to ask him about the identity of the "Leading Big Brother".
- Lü Zhang (呂章) is an elder in charge of supervising martial arts training.
- Elder Xiang (項長老) is an elder in charge of supervising martial arts training.
- Branch Leader Jiang (蔣舵主)
- Deputy Branch Leader Xie (謝副舵主) is Branch Leader Jiang's deputy. He is killed by Western Xia mercenaries.
- Branch Leader Fang (方舵主)
- Zhang Quanxiang (張全祥)
- Li Chunlai (李春來) and Liu Zhuzhuang (劉竹莊) are two low-ranking members who pass a false message to Bai Shijing during the plot to overthrow Qiao Feng. They commit suicide later.

== Carefree Sect ==
- Wuyazi (無崖子) is the leader of the Carefree Sect (逍遙派). He was ambushed and thrown off a cliff by his apprentice, Ding Chunqiu, who betrayed him. He has incredible neigong but is unable to take revenge because he was crippled by the fall. When Xuzhu meets him after breaking his weiqi formation by luck, he is already in his 90s and has been waiting all these years for a potential successor. Before dying, he transfers his 70 years' worth of neigong to Xuzhu and names him the new leader of the Carefree Sect. He also gives Xuzhu a painting of a woman (Li Qiushui's sister) who looks like Wang Yuyan and tells Xuzhu to find her and ask her to guide him in martial arts.
- Li Qiushui (李秋水) is Wuyazi's junior and Tianshan Tonglao's rival. Wuyazi cohabited with her for some time in a cave at Limitless Mountain and conceived a daughter, Li Qingluo, with her. However, his true love was Li Qiushui's younger sister, so he neglects Li Qiushui. Li Qiushui eventually became a consort of the Western Xia emperor and rose to the position of imperial consort dowager after her husband's death. She is already in her late 80s when the events of the novel take place. She dies together with Tianshan Tonglao in the aftermath of their final showdown when they finally realise that Wuyazi loves neither of them.
- Su Xinghe (蘇星河), nicknamed "Deaf Mute Old Man" (聾啞老人) and "Discerning Gentleman" (聰辯先生), is Wuyazi's first apprentice and a master of various arts. As he indulged in his hobbies, he gradually neglected his martial arts practice and became weaker compared to his junior, Ding Chunqiu. After Ding Chunqiu betrayed their master, Su Xinghe saved Wuyazi and pretended to be mute and deaf to put Ding Chunqiu off guard. All these years, he secretly took care of Wuyazi while helping him find a potential heir. He eventually dies after being poisoned by Ding Chunqiu.
- The "Eight Friends of Hangu" (函谷八友) are Su Xinghe's apprentices who each specialises in a particular art or hobby as indicated by their nicknames:
  - Kang Guangling (康廣陵), nicknamed "Guqin Craze" (琴癲).
  - Fan Bailing (范百齡), nicknamed "Weiqi Devil" (棋魔).
  - Gou Du (苟讀), nicknamed "Bookworm" (書獃).
  - Wu Lingjun (吳領軍), nicknamed "Painting Enthusiast" (畫狂).
  - Xue Muhua (薛慕華), nicknamed "Divine Physician" (神醫). He hosts the wulin meeting at Heroes' Gathering Manor along with the You brothers to discuss plans to deal with Qiao Feng. Although he is initially reluctant to heal an injured Azhu, he agrees after Bai Shijing offers to teach him a skill in exchange for healing Azhu. Azhu disguises herself as him when she escapes from the manor to reunite with Qiao Feng.
  - Feng Asan (馮阿三), nicknamed "Marvellous Craftsman" (巧匠).
  - Shi Qingfeng (石清風), nicknamed "Flower Zealot" (花癡).
  - Li Kuilei (李傀儡), nicknamed "Opera Fan" (戲迷).

== Lingjiu Palace ==
- Tianshan Tonglao (天山童姥), literally Child Old Woman of Mount Heaven, is the ruler of Lingjiu Palace (靈鷲宮) on the Ethereal Peak (縹緲峰) of Mount Heaven. Formerly from the Carefree Sect, she was Wuyazi and Li Qiushui's senior, and had been fighting with Li Qiushui all these years for Wuyazi's love. She has started practising "Only I Am Supreme In The Universe Skill" (八荒六合唯我獨尊功) since she was six and it has increased her neigong tremendously. However, the side effect is that every 30 years, she will lose her neigong and revert to being a little girl, and then take the corresponding number of days (one day for each year) to "grow" back to her current age and cumulatively regain her neigong. As she was once interrupted by Li Qiushui during a training session, her body size had since been stuck at that of a little girl's, hence her name. She is already 96 when the events of the novel take place. Over the years, she has used the "Life and Death Talisman" (生死符) to poison many martial artists and force them to submit to her. If they follow her orders, she periodically gives them an antidote to temporarily ease their suffering; if they do not, they will suffer painful deaths. The martial artists under her rule cannot tolerate her cruelty and eventually rebel against her. When the rebellion occurred, she had just lost her powers and would take 90 days to recover. Wu Laoda, the rebel leader, mistook her for a servant girl and kidnapped her from the palace. Xuzhu saves her and protects her from the rebels and Li Qiushui. In return, Tianshan Tonglao tricks or forces Xuzhu into learning martial arts from her despite his reluctance because he still sees himself as a Shaolin monk. In order to force Xuzhu to break the Buddhist code of conduct so that he can no longer be a monk, she captures Princess Yinchuan, tricks her and Xuzhu into consuming aphrodisiac, and lets them make love. Xuzhu is unable to restrain himself and eventually accepts his fate. Tianshan Tonglao dies from exhaustion after her final fight with Li Qiushui; both of them realise that Wuyazi never truly loved either of them.
- Plum Sword (梅劍), Orchid Sword (蘭劍), Chrysanthemum Sword (菊劍) and Bamboo Sword (竹劍) are the Four Attendants to the ruler of Lingjiu Palace. They are named after the Four Gentlemen.
- Yu Po (余婆) is a section leader.
- Shi Sao (石嫂) is a section leader.
- Fu Minyi (符敏儀) is a section leader.
- Cheng Qingshuang (程青霜) is a deputy section leader.

== Xingxiu Sect ==
- Ding Chunqiu (丁春秋), nicknamed "Old Freak of Xingxiu" (星宿老怪), is Wuyazi's former apprentice. He attempted to murder his master by ambushing him and throwing him off a cliff, but did not know that his master had actually survived. He moved to the area near Xingxiu Lake and founded the Xingxiu Sect (星宿派), surrounding himself with "apprentices" who are mostly sycophants. When the events of the novel take place, the Xingxiu Sect is already notorious in the wulin for its use of poison-based martial arts and the "Energy Absorbing Skill" (化功大法) which allows the user to drain another martial artist's neigong. Ding Chunqiu is ultimately defeated by Wuyazi's successor, Xuzhu, and implanted with the "Life and Death Talisman". Although Xuzhu had promised Wuyazi to kill Ding Chunqiu to avenge him, he spares Ding Chunqiu's life and suggests to the Shaolin monks to imprison Ding Chunqiu and try to reform him. If Ding Chunqiu behaves well, Xuzhu will give him the antidote to temporarily ease the agony caused by the "Life and Death Talisman".
- Zhaixingzi (摘星子) is Ding Chunqiu's eldest apprentice. He is defeated by Azi, who has received secret assistance from Xiao Feng.
- Shihouzi (獅吼子), Moyunzi (摩雲子), Zhuifengzi (追風子), Chuchenzi (出塵子) and Tianlangzi (天狼子) are among Ding Chunqiu's apprentices.

== Liao Empire ==
- Yelü Hongji (耶律洪基) is the ambitious emperor of the Liao Empire. He once led a raid on the Jurchen tribes but was defeated and captured by Xiao Feng, who spared his life and became sworn brothers with him. After Xiao Feng helps him suppress the rebellion by Yelü Nielugu and Yelü Chongyuan, in return he gives Yelü Nielugu's princely title and estate to Xiao Feng. Towards the end of the novel, he plans to attack the Song Empire and wants Xiao Feng to lead his army, but the latter refuses. In the last chapter, Xiao Feng takes him hostage and forces him to promise that there will be no war between the Liao and Song Empires for as long as he lives.
- Yelü Nielugu (耶律涅魯古) is Yelü Chongyuan's son and a prince of the Liao Empire. He rebels against Yelü Hongji to help his father seize the throne but is defeated and slain by Xiao Feng. Yelü Hongji then gives Nielugu's title and estate to Xiao Feng.
- Yelü Chongyuan (耶律重元) is an uncle of Yelü Hongji and a Liao prince. He is instigated by his son, Yelü Nielugu, to rebel against Yelü Hongji but the revolt is suppressed. He commits suicide after his defeat.
- Yelü Moge (耶律莫哥) is a minister in the Liao government.
- Consort Mu (穆貴妃) is Yelü Hongji's favourite concubine. She tricks Azi into spiking Xiao Feng's drink with a "love potion", which is actually a drug that will cause him to be temporarily weakened.

== Western Xia Empire ==
- Princess Yinchuan (銀川公主) is a Western Xia princess. Her personal name is not mentioned in the earlier versions of the novel; in the 2012 revision, her name is Li Qinglu (李清露). The princess is Li Qiushui's granddaughter; thus, she is Li Qingluo's niece and Wang Yuyan's cousin, but they are not aware of their relations. She is abducted by Tianshan Tonglao, who makes her consume aphrodisiac and brings her to the ice cellar every night to make love with Xuzhu. This is all part of Tianshan Tonglao's attempt to force Xuzhu to break the Buddhist code of conduct and make him agree to learn martial arts from her; in the process, Xuzhu and the princess fall in love. Princess Yinchuan has never seen Xuzhu's appearance because they have sex in the dark and they only know each other as "dream lovers". In a later chapter, she asks her father to invite martial artists from throughout the wulin to participate in a contest to win her hand-in-marriage in the hope that her "dream lover" will show up. Her wish is fulfilled when Xuzhu joins the contest and provides the correct answers to her questions. She recognises him as her "dream lover" and marries him.
- Helian Tieshu (赫連鐵樹) is a Western Xia general. He is in charge of First Class Hall (一品堂), an organisation established by the Western Xia government to recruit martial artists to serve as mercenaries.

== Tibet ==
- Jiumozhi (鳩摩智), nicknamed "Mahā-cakra-vajra" (大輪明王) after a Buddhist wisdom king, is a reputable Tibetan monk from a Nyingma monastery in the Daxue Mountains. He is well-versed in Buddhism and martial arts; his most powerful skill is "Flaming Saber" (火燄刀), which allows him to project a flaming, blade-like wave of energy from his bare hands. Although he appears to be kind and approachable, he is ruthless in his ways and extremely obsessed with becoming the most powerful martial artist in the wulin. After failing in his attempt to seize the "Six Meridians Divine Sword" manual from Dali, he kidnaps Duan Yu upon learning that the latter has memorised the book. He tries to con and intimidate Duan Yu to write the manual from memory, but Duan Yu escapes with the help of Azhu and Abi. At one point, he challenges the Shaolin Sect, claiming to have mastered all of Shaolin's 72 most powerful skills. He fights with Xuzhu, who recognises that he is actually using non-Shaolin skills in a way that makes them look like Shaolin skills. Xuzhu manages to counter Jiumozhi's every move and the challenge comes to an inconclusive end when Xuzhu's bodyguards show up to protect their master after Jiumozhi tries to stab him with a dagger. Towards the end of the novel, he sustains grievous internal injuries due to his attempts to master Shaolin skills by taking "shortcuts" and not using Buddhist teachings as a guiding philosophy, and nearly dies after entering a state of zouhuorumo. However, Duan Yu saves his life by draining away all his neigong. Despite losing everything he had built up through years of practice, he feels grateful to Duan Yu and repents after seeing how his obsession had caused him to stray so far from Buddhist teachings.
- Zongzan (宗贊) is a Tibetan prince who goes to Western Xia to participate in the contest for Princess Yinchuan's hand-in-marriage.

== Jurchens ==
- Wanyan Aguda (完顏阿骨打) is a Jurchen warrior who encounters Xiao Feng by chance and witnesses him slaying a ferocious bear with his bare hands. He is so impressed with Xiao Feng's skill that he invites him to live together with his tribe.
- Helibo (和哩布) is Wanyan Aguda's father and the chief of a Jurchen tribe.
- Sidalin (斯達林) is the deputy chief of the tribe.
- Xu Zhuocheng (許卓誠) is a Han Chinese trader who is fluent in the Jurchen language. He serves as Xiao Feng's translator when he is living with the Jurchens.

== Heroes' Gathering Manor ==
- You Tanzhi (游坦之) is the heir to the Heroes' Gathering Manor (聚賢莊) owned by the You brothers. After the brothers lose to Qiao Feng, they commit suicide in shame and leave behind You Tanzhi, who blames Qiao Feng for his plight. You Tanzhi is later captured by Liao soldiers at the border and sold into slavery. He meets Qiao Feng again after the latter has been renamed Xiao Feng and become a Liao prince, and attempts to kill him. Xiao Feng lets him go, but Azi captures him after he is released. While Azi tortures him for her sadistic amusement, he is so entranced by her beauty that he develops a crush on her and willingly succumbs to her and becomes her source of entertainment. Azi forces You Tanzhi to have an iron mask welded onto his head to conceal his identity, resulting in his face becoming disfigured, and she nicknames him "Iron Clown" (鐵醜). Later, she forces him to let poisonous creatures bite him as part of her plan to learn the Xingxiu's Sect's "Energy Absorbing Skill" (化功大法). She leaves him to die after he is paralysed by the bites but he finds the Yijin Jing by chance and uses the techniques in the manual to purge the poison from his body. He returns to Azi and repeats the bizarre ritual with her numerous times. He is eventually bitten by the Icy Worm, an extremely rare and poisonous insect, and ends up mastering a powerful skill that allows him to project streams of energy containing icy venom. After Azi is blinded by Ding Chunqiu, You Tanzhi saves her and promises her he will always take care of her. She does not recognise him, and he lies to her that his name is Zhuang Juxian (莊聚賢), a new name he thought of by rearranging the three characters that make up the name of his old home. Later, he meets Quan Guanqing, who helps him remove the iron mask and manipulates him into becoming the puppet chief of the Beggar Clan under his control. At Quan Guanqing's instigation, You Tanzhi challenges the Shaolin Sect for supremacy in a wulin gathering. At Shaolin, You Tanzhi sees Azi being held hostage by Ding Chunqiu, who threatens to kill her if he does not bow to him and call him "Master". You Tanzhi, ignoring the fact that he is the Beggar Clan's chief, agrees to Ding Chunqiu's demands in front of the wulin. After Ding Chunqiu's defeat, You Tanzhi is denounced as a traitor of the Beggar Clan and becomes an outcast of the wulin. In spite of these setbacks, he is unwilling to give up his crush on Azi and follows her everywhere. He even offers his eyes to her to help her regain her sense of sight after she is blinded by Ding Chunqiu, in the hope of winning some love and sympathy from her, but she despises him even more. He follows suit after Azi commits suicide to join Xiao Feng.
- You Ji (游骥) and You Ju (游駒) are the brothers who own the Heroes' Gathering Manor. You Ju is You Tanzhi's father while You Ji is You Tanzhi's uncle. Along with Xue Muhua, they host a wulin gathering for Han Chinese martial artists at their manor to discuss how to deal with Qiao Feng, who is seen as a threat to the wulin after he is wrongly accused of committing several murders. Qiao Feng shows up at the manor to find Xue Muhua to heal Azhu. The martial artists confront him and the situation escalates into a one-against-several battle after Qiao Feng toasts to sever ties with some of his old friends and acquaintances. The You brothers lose to Qiao Feng and commit suicide in shame after their weapons (which are also their family heirlooms) are shattered.
- Shan Zheng (單正), nicknamed "Stern Faced Judge" (鐵面判官), is a reputable martial artist from Mount Tai. He appears at the Beggar Clan meeting in Apricot Forest and is one of the few who know the "Leading Big Brother"'s true identity. He dies in a fire set by Xiao Yuanshan.
- Shan Boshan (單伯山), Shan Zhongshan (單仲山), Shan Shushan (單叔山), Shan Jishan (單季山) and Shan Xiaoshan (單小山) are Shan Zheng's five sons. The first two are killed by Xiao Feng at Heroes' Gathering Manor while the rest die in the fire set by Xiao Yuanshan.
- Tan Gong (譚公) and Tan Po (譚婆) are a reputable elderly couple from Chongxiao Cave (沖霄洞) in the Taihang Mountains known for their prowess in martial arts and medical skills. They are present at the Beggar Clan meeting in Apricot Forest, and are among the few who know the "Leading Big Brother"'s true identity. Tan Po is killed by Xiao Yuanshan while Tan Gong commits suicide to join his wife.
- Zhao Qiansun (趙錢孫) is a cowardly martial artist who was involved in the attack on Xiao Yuanshan's family. He is Tan Po's senior and has always fancied her, so he often secretly meets her to chat and reminisce their good old days. The three Chinese characters that make up his name are incidentally the first three surnames in the Hundred Family Surnames. He is killed by Xiao Yuanshan.
- Qi Laoliu (祁老六), nicknamed "Swift Saber Qi Liu" (快刀祁六), is a martial artist and former acquaintance of Qiao Feng. He is killed by Qiao Feng at Heroes' Gathering Manor after they toast to sever ties with each other.
- Xiang Wanghai (向望海) is a martial artist from the east of the Xiang River. When Qiao Feng is toasting his old friends and acquaintances at Heroes' Gathering Manor to sever ties with them, he tries to have a drink with Qiao Feng too even though he has no past ties with him. Qiao Feng bluntly refuses, grabs him and knocks him out by tossing him aside.
- Bao Qianling (鮑千靈), nicknamed "Penniless" (沒本錢), is a martial artist known for stealing from the rich and helping the poor.

== Wanjie Valley ==
- Zhong Wanchou (鍾萬仇), nicknamed "Horse Deity" (馬王神), is Gan Baobao's husband and the master of an estate in Wanjie Valley (萬劫谷). He is extremely protective of his wife and he hates Duan Zhengchun because he thinks that the latter seduced his wife. However, he does not have the courage to confront Duan Zhengchun, so he places a sign at the valley's entrance which reads: "Anyone with the family name Duan who enters this valley shall be killed without exception." (姓段者入此谷殺無赦) At one point, he invites the "Four Evils" to help him kidnap Duan Yu and Mu Wanqing and make them to commit incest, with the intention of disgracing the Duan family. His plan backfires when Mu Wanqing is saved and replaced with Zhong Ling.
- Jinxi'er (進喜兒) and Laifu'er (來福兒) are servants of the Zhong family. They are killed by Yue Laosan and Li Qingluo's servants respectively.

== Limitless Sword Sect ==
The Limitless Sword Sect (無量劍派) is based on Limitless Mountain. It is renamed "Limitless Cave" (無量洞) after it becomes a subject of Lingjiu Palace.

- Zuo Zimu (左子穆) is the leader of the eastern branch of the sect.
- Xin Shuangqing (辛雙清) is Zuo Zimu's junior and the leader of the western branch.
- Gong Guangjie (龔光傑) dies after opening a letter smeared with poison from the Shennong Clan.
- Gan Guanghao (干光豪) and Ge Guangpei (葛光佩) attempt to elope and they try to kill Duan Yu when he overhears their plan. Mu Wanqing shows up and kills them to save Duan Yu.
- Rong Ziju (容子矩)
- Yu Guangbiao (郁光標)
- Wu Guangsheng (吳光勝)
- Tang Guangxiong (唐光雄)

== Heavenly Dragon Monastery ==
The Heavenly Dragon Monastery (天龍寺) is a Buddhist monastery located in Dali. Some of the monks are former members of Dali's royal family. Like the royal family, they are trained in martial arts and their most powerful skill is the "Six Meridians Divine Sword" (六脈神劍), which allows the practitioner to project blade-like streams of energy from their fingers.

- Kurong (枯榮) is the most senior monk in the monastery. He lets Duan Yu read the "Six Meridians Divine Sword" manual and memorise it before destroying the manual to prevent Jiumozhi from obtaining it.
- Benyin (本因) is the abbot of the monastery.
- Benguan (本觀), Benxiang (本相) and Bencan (本參) combine forces with Benyin, Kurong and Benchen (Duan Zhengming) to counter Jiumozhi when he tries to seize the "Six Meridians Divine Sword" manual from the monastery.

== Lords of the 36 Caves and 72 Islands ==
The Lords of the 36 Caves and 72 Islands (三十六洞洞主，七十二島島主) are a loose assembly of martial artists who were implanted with the "Life and Death Talisman", a deadly poison, and forced into submission by Tianshan Tonglao. If they followed her orders, she would periodically give them an antidote to temporarily ease their suffering. They eventually decide to rebel against Lingjiu Palace when they could no longer stand Tianshan Tonglao's cruelty.

- Wu Laoda (烏老大) is the de facto leader of the lords. He chanced upon Tianshan Tonglao, who was in a temporary state of weakness, and mistook her for a servant girl and kidnapped her. Later, when he is meeting with the other lords to discuss their plan to rebel against Lingjiu Palace, he suggests that everyone kills the girl to pledge their loyalty to their cause. However, Xuzhu intervenes and saves Tianshan Tonglao before they could harm her.
- Sangtugong (桑土公) is the lord of Green Phosphorus Cave (碧磷洞) in Sichuan who is known for his ability to burrow underground to escape from enemies or launch surprise attacks. When Sangtugong tries to kill Xuzhu and Tianshan Tonglao, Xuzhu uses a technique (taught to him by Tianshan Tonglao) to flick conifer cones at Sangtugong, seemingly to disable him. However, Xuzhu does not realise that it is actually a lethal technique and unintentionally kills Sangtugong.
- Taoist Buping (不平道人) is nicknamed "Dragon King" (蛟王). He is unintentionally killed by Xuzhu along with Sangtugong.
- Sikong Xuan (司空玄) is the leader of the Shennong Clan (神農幫). Early in the story, he holds Zhong Ling hostage after he is bitten by her pet, the Lightning Mink, whose bite is venomous because it hunts venomous snakes. He then forces Duan Yu to go to Zhong Ling's home to fetch him the antidote in exchange for her release. Later, he is fooled by Duan Yu and Mu Wanqing, who have disguised themselves as messengers from Lingjiu Palace, and releases Zhong Ling. He commits suicide eventually.
- Xuanhuangzi (玄黃子) is the lord of Hornless Dragon Cave (虯龍洞) in Tibet.
- Zhang Dafu (章達夫) is the lord of Mysterious Island (玄冥島) in the northern sea.
- Duanmu Yuan (端木元) is the lord of Red Flame Cave (赤焰洞) on Wuzhi Mountain in Hainan.
- Madam Li (黎夫人) is the lady of Palm Flower Island (椰花島) in the southern sea.
- Cui Lühua (崔綠華) is nicknamed "Hibiscus Fairy" (芙蓉仙子).
- Zhuo Bufan (卓不凡), nicknamed "God of the Sword" (劍神), is a formidable swordsman from the Yizihui Sword Sect (一字慧劍門).
- Island Lord Qin (欽島主) is the lord of Seahorse Island (海馬島).
- Taoist Jiuyi (九翼道人) is from the Thunder and Lightning Sect (雷電門).
- Island Lord Ou (區島主) is the lord of Swordfish Island (劍魚島). He is killed by Zhuo Bufan.
- Cave Lord Huo (霍洞主) is the lord of Purple Rock Cave (紫巖洞).
- Island Lord Yun (雲島主)
- Hadaba (哈大霸) is the lord of Iron Turtle Island (鐵鰲島).
- Island Lord Sima (司馬島主)
- Cave Lord Yu (於洞主)
- Cave Lord An (安洞主)

== Funiu Sect ==
The Funiu Sect (伏牛派) is based in the Funiu Mountains.

- Cui Baiquan (崔百泉), nicknamed "Golden Abacus" (金算盤), is Ke Baisui's junior. In the past, he offended the Murong family and was forced to take shelter in Dali, where he assumes a new identity as an accountant in Duan Zhengchun's residence. He spends most of his time drinking and gambling. Duan Yu befriends him through their common interest in weiqi.
- Guo Yanzhi (過彥之), nicknamed "Soul Chasing Whip" (追魂鞭), is Ke Baisui's apprentice. He travels to Dali to seek Cui Baiquan's help in hunting down the person who murdered his master.
- Ke Baisui (柯百歲) was the chief of the Funiu Sect who was murdered by Murong Bo, who had used his own signature move against him.

== Nianhua Monastery ==
- Master Huangmei (黃眉大師) is the abbot of Nianhua Monastery (拈花寺) who specialises in using the "Vajra Finger" (金剛指). He plays an important role in rescuing Duan Yu from Wanjie Valley by distracting Duan Yanqing in a game of weiqi while Duan Zhengchun's men dig a tunnel to the room where Duan Yu is held captive. He once met Murong Bo when the latter was still a boy, and had been nearly killed when the boy used the "Vajra Finger" to strike him in the chest, narrowly missing his heart.
- Pochen (破嗔) and Pochi (破痴) are Huangmei's apprentices.

== Penglai and Qingcheng Sects ==
The Penglai Sect (蓬萊派) is based in Penglai, Shandong while the Qingcheng Sect (青城派) is based on Mount Qingcheng in Sichuan. The two sects have an ongoing rivalry.

- Dulingzi (都靈子) is the leader of the Penglai Sect.
- Sima Lin (司馬林) is the leader of the Qingcheng Sect. After his father, Sima Wei (司馬衛), was murdered by someone who used his own signature move against him, he thinks that Murong Fu is responsible so he goes to Gusu to confront Murong Fu.
- Zhu Baokun (諸保昆) is a spy sent by the Penglai Sect to infiltrate the Qingcheng Sect.

== Shenshan Shangren and associates ==
- Shenshan Shangren (神山上人) is the abbot of Qingliang Monastery (清涼寺) on Mount Wutai. When he was younger, he wanted to join the Shaolin Sect but was turned away because he was considered too pretentious and arrogant. Still holding a grudge against Shaolin all these years, he finds an excuse to challenge Shaolin for the "ownership" of three of Shaolin's 72 most powerful skills, inviting several reputable monks to serve as his witnesses and put pressure on Shaolin. He gives up and leaves after seeing how Jiumozhi has apparently single-handedly mastered all the 72 skills.
- Boluoxing (波羅星) is a monk from India who was detained in Shaolin for years after he was caught stealing martial arts manuals.
- Zheluoxing (哲羅星) is Boluoxing's senior. He accompanies Shenshan Shangren to Shaolin and demands the release of his junior.
- Master Guanxin (觀心大師) is from Daxiangguo Temple in Kaifeng.
- Master Daoqing (道清大師) is from Pudu Monastery (普渡寺) in Jiangnan.
- Master Juexian (覺賢大師) is from Donglin Temple in Jiujiang.
- Master Rongzhi (融智大師) is from Jingying Temple (淨影寺) in Chang'an.
- Master Shenyin (神音大師) is from Qingliang Monastery on Mount Wutai.

== Others ==
- Xiao Yuanshan (蕭遠山) is Xiao Feng's father. 30 years ago, he and his family were attacked by a group of masked assailants at Yanmen Pass and his wife was killed. He attempted suicide by jumping off a cliff but survived and devoted himself to seeking vengeance on the attackers, whose leader he has identified to be Xuanci. Over the years, he has been hiding in Shaolin Monastery and secretly learning martial arts from the manuals in the library, while plotting to expose Xuanci's secret affair with Ye Erniang and publicly disgrace him one day. In the end, he realises how blinded he has been by his desire for revenge, and feels so grateful to the Sweeper Monk for saving him that he becomes a monk for the rest of his life.
- Master Zhiguang (智光大師) is a reputable monk from Tiantai Mountain. Before he became a monk, he was involved in the attack on Xiao Yuanshan's family at Yanmen Pass 30 years ago. He regretted his actions and has since turned to Buddhism and done many good deeds to atone for his past sins. He appears at the Beggar Clan meeting in Apricot Forest to narrate the events of the Yanmen Pass incident. Later, he commits suicide after declining to tell Xiao Feng the identity of the "Leading Big Brother".
- Qiao Sanhuai (喬三槐) is Xiao Feng's adoptive father. He is killed along with his wife by Xiao Yuanshan for not telling their adoptive son about his true parentage.
- Yao Bodang (姚伯當) is the master of the Qin Family Fort (秦家寨) in Yunzhou. After his junior, Qin Boqi (秦伯起), was murdered by somebody who used his own signature move against him, he thinks that Murong Fu is responsible so he goes to Gusu to confront Murong Fu.
- Wang Tongzhi (王通治) is a physician who fails to heal Azi of her internal injuries.
