= Demi-Gods and Semi-Devils (film) =

1984 Hong Kong film by Siu Sang

- DVD cover art
- 天龍八部
- Directed by: Siu Sang
- Screenplay by: Siu Sang
- Based on: Demi-Gods and Semi-Devils by Jin Yong
- Produced by: Ko Miu-sheung; Sin Ching-sang
- Starring: Norman Chui; Kent Tong; Felix Wong; Idy Chan; Lam Jan-kei; Austin Wai
- Release date: 1984
- Running time: 90 minutes
- Country: Hong Kong
- Language: Cantonese

Demi-Gods and Semi-Devils (天龍八部), also known as Dragon Story, is a 1984 Hong Kong wuxia film adapted from the novel of the same title by Jin Yong. The film was directed and written by Siu Sang, starring Norman Chui, Kent Tong, Felix Wong, Idy Chan, Lam Jan-kei, and Austin Wai.

The film is not to be confused with the 1982 Hong Kong television series of the same title produced by TVB.

== Cast ==
- Norman Chui as Qiao Feng
- Kent Tong as Duan Yu
- Felix Wong as Xuzhu
- Idy Chan as Wang Yuyan
- Lam Jan-kei as Azhu
- Austin Wai as Murong Fu
- Eddy Ko as Jiumozhi
- Lee Lung-kei as Duan Zhengchun
- Lau Kong as Yelü Hongji
