= The Battle Wizard =

1977 Hong Kong film by Pao Hsueh-li

- DVD cover art
- 天龍八部
- Directed by: Pao Hsueh-li
- Screenplay by: Ni Kuang
- Based on: Demi-Gods and Semi-Devils by Jin Yong
- Produced by: Run Run Shaw
- Starring: Danny Lee; Tien Lie; Lam Jan-kei; Wai Wang
- Cinematography: Yuen Teng-bong
- Edited by: Chiang Hsing-lung
- Music by: Frankie Chan
- Production company: Shaw Brothers Studio
- Distributed by: Shaw Brothers Studio
- Release date: 9 September 1977
- Running time: 77 minutes
- Country: Hong Kong
- Language: Mandarin

The Battle Wizard (天龍八部) is a 1977 Hong Kong wuxia film adapted from the novel Demi-Gods and Semi-Devils by Jin Yong, focusing on the story of Duan Yu. The screenplay was written by Ni Kuang, and the film was produced by the Shaw Brothers Studio and directed by Pao Hsueh-li.

== Synopsis ==
Duan Zhengchun, a prince of the Dali Kingdom, was notorious for his philandering ways when he was younger. At one point, he had a secret affair with Qin Hongmian, but was discovered by her husband, a man dressed in yellow. Duan used his signature move, the "Yiyang Finger", to defeat Qin's husband and break his legs. Shortly after, Duan's fiancée, Shu Baifeng, showed up and took Duan away after humiliating Qin.

In the present, Duan Zhengchun and Shu Baifeng's grown-up son, Duan Yu, runs away from home after his family tries to force him to learn martial arts. He roams the jianghu and befriends Zhong Ling, a girl who likes playing with snakes. When they run into trouble, they are saved by Qin Hongmian's daughter, Mu Wanqing.

The man in yellow, having cultivated his neigong for over ten years in preparation for revenge against Duan Zhengchun, teams up with his junior Yue Canglong to capture Duan Yu and hold him hostage. Duan Zhengchun and his brother Duan Zhengming travel to confront the man in yellow and save Duan Yu.

== Cast ==
- Danny Lee as Duan Yu
- Tien Lie as Mu Wanqing
- Lam Jan-kei as Zhong Ling
- Si Wai as Duan Zhengchun
- Shut Chung-tin as the Man in Yellow
- Wai Wang as Duan Zhengming
- Kong Do as Yue Canglong
- Keung Hon as Sikong Xuan
- Sun Shu-wah as Zhong Wanchou
- Hung Ling-ling as Shu Baifeng
- Kam Lau as Qin Hongmian
- Teresa Ha as Gan Baobao
- Norman Chui as Gu Ducheng
- Yeung Chak-lam as Chu Wanli
