= Demi-Gods and Semi-Devils (2003 TV series) =

2003 Chinese TV series

- Poster
- Also known as: Heaven Dragon: The Eight Episode
- 天龙八部
- Genre: Wuxia
- Based on: Demi-Gods and Semi-Devils by Jin Yong
- Screenplay by: Chen Yixing; Dai Mingyu; Sun Duo; Bai Yicong
- Directed by: Yu Min; Kuk Kwok-leung; Zhou Xiaowen
- Starring: Hu Jun; Jimmy Lin; Gao Hu; Liu Tao; Liu Yifei; Chen Hao
- Theme music composer: Zhao Jiping
- Ending theme: "Forgiveness" (宽恕) by Faye Wong
- Country of origin: China
- Original language: Mandarin
- No. of episodes: 40

Production
- Producers: Zhang Jizhong; Zhou Li; Wang Pengju; Yao Xiaodong; Chi Chenxi; Guo Gang
- Production location: Demi-Gods and Semi-Devils film city
- Running time: ≈50 minutes per episode

Original release
- Network: CCTV
- Release: 22 December 2003

Demi-Gods and Semi-Devils (天龙八部) is a Chinese wuxia television series adapted from the novel of the same title by Jin Yong. Produced by Zhang Jizhong and others, it starred Hu Jun, Jimmy Lin, Gao Hu, Liu Yifei, Liu Tao, and Chen Hao. It was first aired in China on CCTV on 22 December 2003.

== Cast ==
- Hu Jun as Qiao Feng / Xiao Yuanshan (young)
- Jimmy Lin as Duan Yu
- Gao Hu as Xuzhu
- Liu Yifei as Wang Yuyan
- Liu Tao as Azhu
- Chen Hao as Azi
- Yang Rui as Zhong Ling
- Jiang Xin as Mu Wanqing
- Tong Chun-chung as Duan Zhengchun
- Xiu Qing as Murong Fu
- Diana Pang as Qin Hongmian
- Ruan Danning as Gan Baobao
- Gao Yuan as Dao Baifeng
- Christy Chung as Kang Min
- Wang Luyao as Madam Wang
- Li Yongyong as Ruan Xingzhu
- Ji Chunhua as Duan Yanqing
- Shi Lan as Ye Erniang
- Li Yu as Yue Laosan
- Gao Zhao as Yun Zhonghe
- Shen Junyi as Ding Chunqiu
- Shu Chang as Tianshan Tonglao
- Ma Yuke as You Tanzhi
- Ba Yin as Jiumozhi
- Zhang Qian as Xiao Yuanshan
- Ren Wu as Murong Bo
- Ebusi Yonglin as Yelü Hongji
- Sun Jiaolong as Wanyan Aguda
- Lü Shigang as Duan Zhengming
- Zhang Hengping as Chu Wanli
- Liu Liwei as Ba Tianshi
- Ren Zewei as Zhu Danchen
- Zhao Yong as Bao Butong
- Xiu Ge as Feng Bo'e
- Zhang Jizhong as Wang Jiantong
- Xu Wenbin as Wu Changfeng
- Li Jun as Elder Song
- Ma Lun as Bai Shijing
- Ma Yingbo as Ma Dayuan
- Zhang Zhihong as Zhao Qiansun
- Bai Jiancai as Tan Gong
- Li Jingjing as Tan Po
- Wang Wensheng as Shan Zheng
- Bai Ma as Qi Liu
- Wei Zongwan as Zhong Wanchou
- Xu Huanshan as Wuyazi
- Liu Zhongyuan as Su Xinghe
- Xie Yuxin as Li Qiushui
- Hou Yueqiu as Wu Laoda
- Wang Haizhen as Princess Yinchuan
- Zha Xi as Kang Guangling
- Yang Niansheng as Xuanci
- Chang Yuping as Xuanku
- Dong Zhichen as Huilun
- Zhou Bingqing as Plum Sword
- Zhou Yujie as Bamboo Sword
- Zheng Shuang as Granny Yu
- Jin Song as Helian Tieshu
- Guo Jun as You Ju

== Production ==
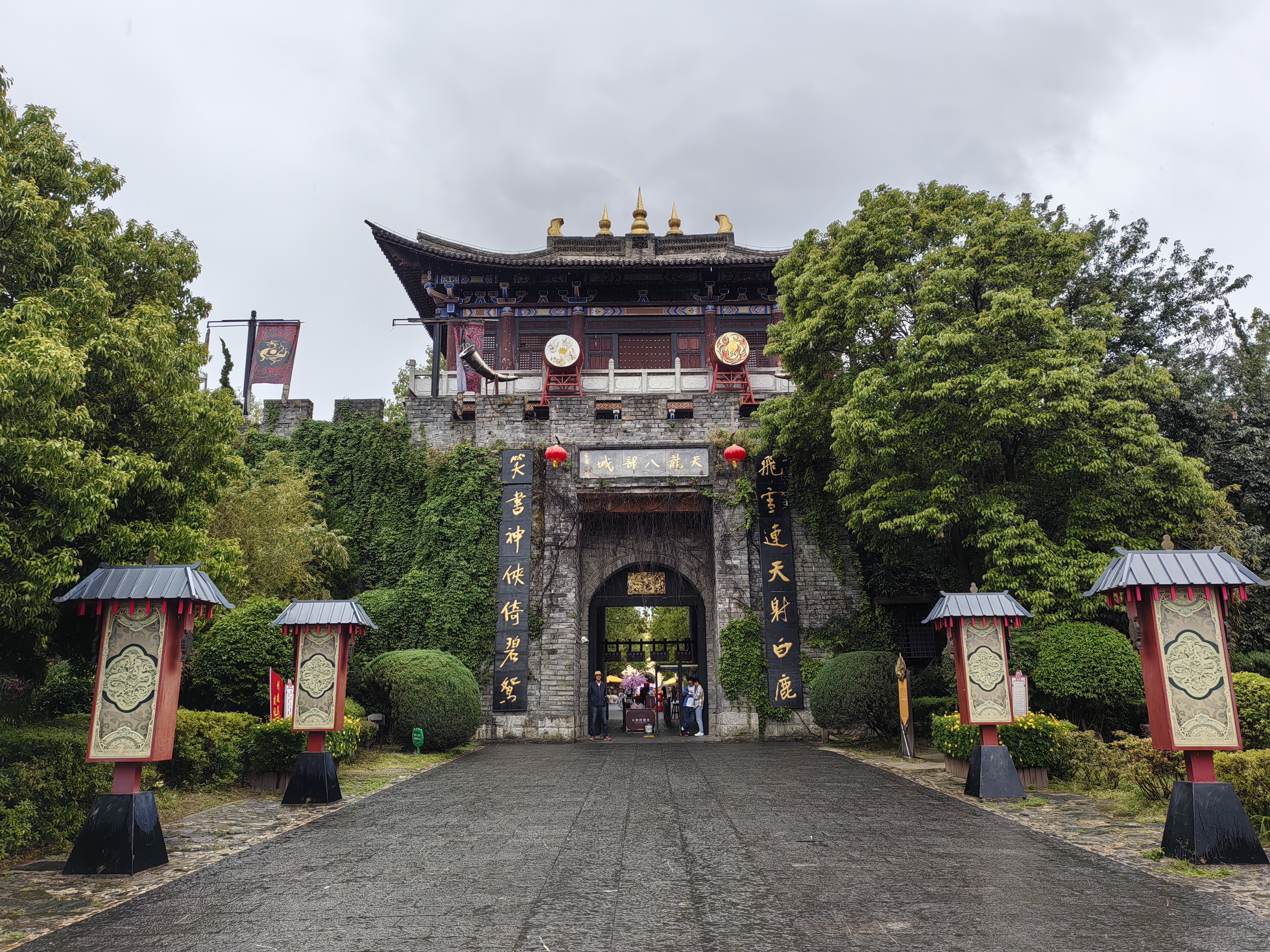
The Demi-Gods and Semi-Devils film city in Dali City, Yunnan

The series was partly filmed at the Demi-Gods and Semi-Devils film city in Dali City, Yunnan, which has since become a tourist attraction.

== Music ==
- "Forgiveness" (宽恕) by Faye Wong, the ending theme song.
- "Look Up to" (仰望) by Xie Yuxin
- "Lotus Beauty" (莲美人) by Tang Can
- "Love Song of Mountains and Rivers" (山川情歌) by Xiangnü and Zhao Dadi
- "I'm True, I Love" (我真我爱) by Tan Weiwei
