= Sakra (film) =

2023 Hong Kong-Chinese film by Donnie Yen

- Theatrical release poster

Chinese name
- Traditional Chinese: 天龍八部之喬峯傳
- Simplified Chinese: 天龙八部之乔峰传
Transcriptions
- Directed by: Donnie Yen (Note: Donnie Yen served as the main director for the film, while Kam Ka-wai and Cheng Wai-man are the co-directors.)
- Screenplay by: Sheng Lingzhi; Zhu Wei; He Ben; Chen Li; Shen Lejing; Xu Yifan
- Based on: Demi-Gods and Semi-Devils by Jin Yong
- Produced by: Donnie Yen; Wong Jing
- Starring: Donnie Yen; Chen Yuqi; Cya Liu; Kara Wai; Wu Yue; Eddie Cheung; Grace Wong; Ray Lui
- Cinematography: Chan Chi-ying
- Edited by: Li Ka-wing
- Music by: Choi Chul-ho
- Production companies: Wishart Media; Mandarin Motion Pictures; Shaw Brothers; Jing's Production
- Distributed by: Mandarin Motion Pictures
- Release dates: January 16, 2023 (Malaysia, Singapore); January 19, 2023 (Hong Kong, Macau); January 20, 2023 (Taiwan); January 25, 2023 (South Korea)
- Running time: 130 minutes
- Countries: Hong Kong; China
- Languages: Cantonese; Mandarin
- Budget: CN¥150 million
- Box office: US$3,582,391

Sakra (transl. Sakra; 天龍八部之喬峯傳; lit. 'Demi-Gods and Semi-Devils: The Legend of Qiao Feng') is a 2023 wuxia film starring and directed by Donnie Yen in his first film as director since Protégé de la Rose Noire (2004). The film is a co-production between Hong Kong and China, and Yen co-produced the film with Wong Jing. Co-starring Chen Yuqi and Cya Liu, the film is adapted from the wuxia novel Demi-Gods and Semi-Devils by Jin Yong, and was released in OTT platforms in China during the 2023 Lunar New Year. It was the top Lunar New Year film across the three biggest streaming platforms in China – IQiyi, Tencent and Youku – with streaming revenues exceeding the film's budget within 10 days of release. It was also released in theatres in Malaysia and Singapore on 16 January 2023 where it ranked as one of the top Chinese films at the box office in 2023.

== Synopsis ==
As a baby, Khitan-born Qiao Feng lost his parents and was raised by a couple from the Song Empire, which was at war with the Khitan-led Liao Empire. He grows up to become a formidable and righteous martial artist, eventually becoming the chief of the Beggar Clan, one of the largest martial arts clans in the wulin (martial artists' community). However, he falls from grace after his Khitan heritage is revealed, and also after he is wrongly accused of committing murders.

During this time, Qiao Feng meets and falls in love with Azhu, who stands by him even though the wulin has mostly turned against him. He takes her to Heroes Gathering Manor to seek help from the physician Xue Muhua after she is accidentally injured. At the manor, he is surrounded and confronted by several martial artists, including some old friends and acquaintances, who now consider him a threat to the wulin. Forced to sever ties with them, he then fights and kills many of them. Towards the end, a wounded Qiao Feng is saved by a mysterious man.

Azhu, after being healed by Xue Muhua, escapes from the manor and reunites with Qiao Feng, who has confirmed his Khitan origin and now goes by the name "Xiao Feng". Believing that "Leading Big Brother", who was responsible for his parents' deaths, is behind the murders, Xiao Feng sets out with Azhu to uncover "Leading Big Brother"'s identity. At one point, Xiao Feng mistakenly thinks that "Leading Big Brother" is the Dali prince Duan Zhengchun and mortally wounds him. However, the Duan Zhengchun he wounded turns out to be Azhu in disguise. Before dying, she reveals that she had just discovered that Duan Zhengchun is her long-lost father, and she hopes that her death will appease Xiao Feng. Xiao Feng deeply regrets his actions but it is too late. While mourning Azhu, he learns that Duan Zhengchun is not "Leading Big Brother".

Qiao Feng, accompanied by Azhu's sister Azi, gets into a fight with Murong Fu and defeats him. He takes Azhu's remains to the countryside and buries her as his wife, after which he and Azi ride towards Liao soldiers. In the mid-credits scenes, Murong Fu is revived by his father, Murong Bo. Xiao Yuanshan, Xiao Feng's father, is also revealed to have survived all these years, and is the one behind the murders his son is accused of.

== Cast ==
- Donnie Yen as Qiao Feng / Xiao Yuanshan
- Chen Yuqi as Azhu
- Cya Liu as Azi
- Kara Wai as Ruan Xingzhu
- Wu Yue as Murong Fu
- Eddie Cheung as Duan Zhengchun
- Grace Wong as Kang Min
- Du Yuming as Bai Shijing
- Ray Lui as Murong Bo
- Michelle Hu as Xiao Yuanshan's wife
- Tsui Siu-ming as Jiumozhi
- Cai Xiangyu as Abi
- Zhao Huawei as Duan Yu
- Yu Kang as You Ju
- Xu Xiangdong as Xuannan
- Yuen Cheung-yan as Xue Muhua

== Production ==
Principal photography for the film started on 27 July 2022 and concluded in October 2022. In April 2022, the film was registered as a "web-distributed film" in China National Radio and Television Administration. In May 2022, the first concept poster was released during the 2022 Cannes Film Festival. The production crew was also announced, including Donnie Yen as the director, producer and lead cast. In July 2022, Cya Liu indicated that she would join the cast during the interview with Oriental Daily News. In August 2022, Grace Wong posted a photo on social media, showing herself wearing a Sakra T-shirt at Hengdian World Studios. In September 2022, a behind-the-scene video clip showing Donnie Yen and Chen Yuqi was released. In October 2022, the film ended filming, and moved on to post-production.

== Release ==
In December 2022, it was announced that the film was scheduled for release in theatres in Malaysia on 16 January 2023.

Sakra did well in its theatrical release in Southeast Asia, grossing a total of Singapore Dollar 955,000 in Singapore, the fifth highest grossing Asian film in 2023 as well as close to Malaysia Ringgit 6 million, the sixth highest grossing Asian film in Malaysia for 2023.

In Mainland China, it was one of the most streamed movies in 2023 alongside Avatar: The Way of Water and received the award for outstanding streaming movie at the Golden Swan festival held in Macau on 16 December 2023 in recognition of the film's strong streaming revenue.

== Reception ==
Review aggregator website Rotten Tomatoes reports an approval rating of 70% based on 20 reviews. Simon Abrams of RogerEbert.com gave the film three stars and called it "a surprisingly well-realized star vehicle and adaptation."
