= Tianshou =

Tianshou (天授) was a Chinese era name used by several emperors of China. It may refer to:

- Tianshou (690–692), era name used by Wu Zetian
- Tianshou (1096), era name used by Duan Zhengchun, emperor of Dali
