= Xu Zhu =

Xu Zhu may refer to:

- Xu Chu (許褚), a warrior serving under the warlord Cao Cao during the late Han Dynasty
- Xuzhu (虛竹), one of the three protagonists of the wuxia novel Demi-Gods and Semi-Devils by Jin Yong
