= Mei Lanfang Classics =

Mei Lanfang Classics (Chinese: 梅兰芳华; Chinese: 梅蘭芳華) is a Peking opera production which is composed of six classics from Peking Opera master Mei Lanfang. The performance is held in the Zheng Yici Peking Opera Theatre (pinyin: Zhèngyǐcí Xìlóu), an ancient theatre in Beijing. The director is Li Liuyi, and the art director is Mei Baojiu, the son of Mei Lanfang.
