= Qiao Feng =

Qiao Feng (喬峰)
- First appearance: Demi-Gods and Semi-Devils
- Created by: Jin Yong

In-universe information
- Aliases: Xiao Feng (birth name) (蕭峰)
- Nicknames: "Northern Qiao Feng" (北喬峰)
- Gender: Male
- Affiliation: Beggars' Gang, Shaolin School
- Weapon: Dog Beating Staff
- Family: Xiao Yuanshan (father), Qiao Sanhuai (adoptive father)
- Spouse: A'zhu (fiancée)

Qiao Feng, born Xiao Feng, is one of the protagonists of the wuxia novel Demi-Gods and Semi-Devils by Jin Yong. He is a tragic hero whose tragedy resembles that of ancient Greek hero Oedipus.

== Fictography ==
=== Background ===
Xiao Feng's father was Xiao Yuanshan, a Khitan martial artist from the same clan as Empress Xiao of the Khitan-led Liao Empire. When he was still an infant, his parents brought him on a trip to the Han Chinese-dominated Song Empire, the Liao Empire's rival. Along the way, they were ambushed by a group of masked assailants at Yanmen Pass and Xiao Feng's mother was killed. Xiao Yuanshan, who suffered grave injuries while fending off the attackers, carved a message in the Khitan language on a rock before jumping off a cliff with his family. However, he instantly regretted his decision so he tossed his son upwards before apparently plunging to his death. The surviving assailants managed to catch the infant, decided to spare his life, and entrusted him to the care of Qiao Sanhuai, a Han Chinese peasant, and his wife. Xiao Feng was raised by the Qiao couple and became known as Qiao Feng.

When Qiao Feng was still a child, he met Xuanku, a Shaolin monk, who trained him in martial arts. Later, he joined the Beggars' Gang and gradually made his name by successfully completing many missions for the gang, including defending the Song border from incursions by Liao forces. As his fame and popularity grew, he eventually became the chief of the Beggars' Gang after the death of the previous chief, Wang Jiantong. By the time the events of the novel take place, Qiao Feng, who is around the age of 30, is regarded as the most powerful fighter in the wulin (martial artists' community) and is best known for his mastery of the "Eighteen Dragon-Subduing Palms" (降龍十八掌).

=== Fall from grace ===
Qiao Feng's life is turned upside-down when his Khitan ancestry is revealed at a Beggars' Gang meeting in Apricot Forest (杏子林) near Wuxi; he had never been told about his true parentage until that point in time. He is also suspected of murdering the gang's deputy chief, Ma Dayuan, who was the safekeeper of a sealed letter containing details of Qiao Feng's background. Some Beggars' Gang members, including four senior elders, who had found out about Qiao Feng's background earlier had attempted to overthrow him from his position as chief out of fear that he might turn against them. However, Qiao Feng pardoned them on account of their past contributions. Nevertheless, Qiao Feng voluntarily leaves the Beggars' Gang, having realised that they will never fully trust him anymore, and goes on a quest to verify the claims about his ancestry.

Meanwhile, the Qiao couple and Xuanku are murdered by an unknown attacker, and the blame falls on Qiao Feng, who is now seen as a vicious murderer and a serious threat to the wulin. During this time, he encounters Azhu, a servant of the Murong family, who has disguised herself as a monk to steal the Yijin Jing from Shaolin Monastery. After she is critically wounded, Qiao Feng braves danger by bringing her to Heroes Gathering Manor to seek help from Xue Muhua, a renowned physician, despite knowing that Xue and the manor's owners have called for a wulin meeting to discuss how to deal with him. At the manor, a heavily outnumbered Qiao Feng is forced to sever ties with the wulin and engage the martial artists in a one-against-several battle. He kills many of them, including some of his old friends and acquaintances, but suffers grave injuries in the process. At a critical moment, a masked fighter in black shows up, saves him and brings him to an isolated area to recuperate before leaving him.

=== Romance with Azhu ===
After recovering, Qiao Feng heads to Yanmen Pass to continue his quest and meets Azhu, who has also recovered. They gradually develop a romantic relationship and Qiao Feng comes to accept the fact that he is a Khitan after seeing a wolf tattoo on the chest of a Khitan man similar to his. He calls himself "Xiao Feng" from then on and seeks vengeance on "Leading Big Brother", the man who led the ambush on his parents 30 years ago at Yanmen Pass. When he tries to find those who knew the identity of "Leading Big Brother", all of them are either mysteriously murdered or have chosen to commit suicide. Since Kang Min, Ma Dayuan's widow, is the only surviving person who knows who "Leading Big Brother" is, Azhu offers to help by disguising herself as Beggars' Gang elder Bai Shijing to trick Kang Min into revealing the truth. Unknown to both Xiao Feng and Azhu, Kang Min has a secret affair with Bai Shijing so she sees through Azhu's disguise when Azhu, in disguise as Bai Shijing, fails to answer some personal questions correctly. Kang Min then lies to Azhu that "Leading Big Brother" is Duan Zhengchun.

Xiao Feng finds Duan Zhengchun later and has reservations about taking revenge after seeing how Duan risks his life for his bodyguards. He confronts Duan Zhengchun by asking if he had done "something wrong many years ago that led to a child growing up without knowing who his/her parents were". Duan Zhengchun replies "yes" and expresses regret, mistakenly thinking that Xiao Feng is referring to his past philandering ways and the children he has out of wedlock with his many mistresses. Xiao Feng then challenges Duan Zhengchun to a duel that night. Meanwhile, Azhu has discovered that she is actually one of Duan Zhengchun's illegitimate children and decides to sacrifice herself to appease Xiao Feng, disguising herself as Duan Zhengchun and taking his place during the duel. Xiao Feng mortally injures Azhu, thinking that she is Duan Zhengchun, and she dies in his arms after telling him that she is actually Duan Zhengchun's daughter. Before dying, she asks him to take good care of her younger sister, Azi. Xiao Feng realises his mistake later after seeing that Duan Zhengchun's handwriting does not match that of "Leading Big Brother". He tries to find out from Kang Min, but her face has been disfigured by Azi and she dies of shock before she can tell him.

=== Life in the Liao Empire ===
Feeling regret and sorrow, Xiao Feng leaves with Azi and wanders into northeast China, where he befriends a Jurchen chieftain's son, Wanyan Aguda, and lives with the Jurchens. One day, when the Jurchens are attacked by Khitan soldiers, Xiao Feng defeats them and captures their leader, who turns out to be Yelü Hongji, the ruler of the Khitan-led Liao Empire. He spares Yelü Hongji's life and becomes sworn brothers with him. Later, he assists Yelü Hongji in suppressing a rebellion by a Liao prince. In return for his service, he receives the prince's title and estate.

=== Revelation ===
Some time later, Xiao Feng returns to the Song Empire to find Azi and attend another wulin meeting at Shaolin Monastery, where he combines forces with his two other sworn brothers, Duan Yu and Xuzhu, to defeat all their opponents. After the battle, the masked fighter who had saved Xiao Feng earlier at Heroes Gathering Manor appears and reveals himself to be Xiao Yuanshan, who has survived the fall 30 years ago and sworn vengeance on the assailants who killed his wife. All these years, he had been hiding in Shaolin and learning various martial arts from the manuals in the library while biding his time. He was also responsible for murdering the Qiao couple, Xuanku, and those who knew the identity of "Leading Big Brother", who turns out to be Xuanci, the abbot of Shaolin. Xuanci dies after accepting punishment for his past sins; Xiao Yuanshan gives up his desire for revenge and becomes a monk after a formidable senior nameless monk who sweeps the Shaolin library heals him physically and mentally. Xiao Feng's name is cleared and he makes peace with the wulin; the Beggars' Gang invites him to be their chief again but he declines.

After Xiao Feng returns to the Liao Empire, Yelü Hongji tells him that he is planning to invade the Song Empire and he wants Xiao Feng to lead the Liao army. Xiao Feng refuses as he feels indebted to the Song Empire, where he was raised and trained, and also because he wants to avoid bloodshed; he then secretly prepares to leave the Liao Empire. Yelü Hongji instructs his concubine to trick Azi into making Xiao Feng consume a "love potion" that will temporarily weaken him; Xiao Feng loses his strength when he is about to leave and ends up being captured and imprisoned. Azi escapes and seeks help from Duan Yu and Xuzhu, who manage to rally their allies in the wulin to infiltrate the Liao Empire and save Xiao Feng. Although the rescue mission is successful, all of them are eventually outnumbered and besieged at Yanmen Pass by Liao forces. Xiao Feng, having regained his strength, manages to fight his way through and take Yelü Hongji hostage. He then forces Yelü Hongji to swear that there will be no war between Liao and Song for as long as he lives; the emperor keeps his word and withdraws his army. Feeling guilty for holding the emperor hostage and "betraying" his country's expansion plans, Xiao Feng commits suicide to prove that his actions were for the greater good of peace between both sides and not to earn rewards from Song.
