= Demi-Gods and Semi-Devils (1997 TV series) =

1997 Hong Kong TV series

- VCD cover art
- 天龍八部
- Genre: Wuxia
- Based on: Demi-Gods and Semi-Devils by Jin Yong
- Screenplay by: Leung Wing-mui; Lau Choi-wun; Tam Ling
- Directed by: Yuen Ying-ming; Lau Kwok-ho; Chan Chi-kong; Chan Seung-kuen; Sin Yin-fong; Ho Shu-pui
- Starring: Felix Wong; Benny Chan; Louis Fan; Carman Lee
- Theme music composer: Wakin Chau
- Opening theme: "A Hard Scripture to Read" (難唸的經) by Wakin Chau
- Country of origin: Hong Kong
- Original language: Cantonese
- No. of episodes: 56 (original version); 45 (edited version)

Production
- Executive producer: Lee Tim-shing
- Production location: Hong Kong
- Editor: Leung Wing-mui
- Running time: ≈45 minutes per episode
- Production company: TVB

Original release
- Network: TVB Jade
- Release: 28 July – 26 September 1997

Demi-Gods and Semi-Devils (天龍八部) is a Hong Kong wuxia television series adapted from the novel of the same title by Jin Yong. Produced by TVB, it starred Felix Wong, Benny Chan, Louis Fan and Carman Lee. It was first broadcast on TVB Jade in Hong Kong in 1997.

== Cast ==
- Felix Wong as Qiao Feng / Xiao Yuanshan
- Benny Chan as Duan Yu
- Louis Fan as Xuzhu
- Carman Lee as Wang Yuyan / Madam Wang (Wang Yuyan's Mother) / Li Qiushui's sister (Wang Yuyan's Grandmother)
- Jay Lau as Azhu
- Bondy Chiu as Mu Wanqing
- He Meitian as Zhong Ling
- Rain Lau as Azi
- Cheung Kwok-keung as Murong Fu
- Pat Poon as Duan Zhengchun
- Lisa Lui as Dao Baifeng
- Suet Lei as Kang Min
- Lau Dan as Ma Dayuan
- Lee Kwai-ying as Gan Baobao
- Michelle Fung as Qin Hongmian
- Ma Ching-yee as Ruan Xingzhu
- Mak Cheung-ching as You Tanzhi
- Bruce Li as Duan Yanqing
- Joseph Lee as Jiumozhi
- Chan On-ying as Tianshan Tonglao
- Felix Lok as Murong Bo
- Lily Li as Ye Erniang
- Chun Wong as Yue Laosan
- Lee Tzi-kei as Yun Zhonghe
- Ceci So as Li Qiushui
- Kong Hon as Duan Zhengming
- Lau Kong as Xuanci
- Bao Fong as the Sweeper Monk
- Henry Lee as Wuyazi
- Chiu Shek-man as Ding Chunqiu
- Kwok Tak-shun as Bai Shijing
- Chan Wing-chun as Quan Guanqing
- Elton Loo as Bao Butong
- Bok Gwan as Feng Bo'e
- Wong Wai as Yelü Hongji
- Natalie Wong as Princess Yinchuan
- Candy Chiu as Abi
- Claire Chan as Plum Sword
- Ammathy Winnie Lui as Orchid Sword
- Ng Wai Shan as Chrysanthemum Sword
- Daisy Wong as Bamboo Sword
- Chan On-kei as Xiao Yuanshan's wife
- Lee Wai-kei as Fu Sigui
- Cheung Hon-bun as Gu Ducheng
- Koo Ming-wah as Chu Wanli
- Wong Wai-leung as Zhu Danchen
- Yu Miu-Lin as Granny Rui
- Fung Sui-chan as Granny Ping
- Celine Ma as Murong Fu's mother
- Kam Hing-hin as Wang Jiantong
- Wong Sun as Elder Xu
- Cho Chai as Wu Changfeng
- Leung Siu-tik as Elder Song
- Lee Yiu-ging as Chen Guyan
- Yau Mun-sing as Xi Shanhe
- Yu Tin-wai as Tan Gong
- Law Lan as Tan Po
- Cheng Ka-sang as Zhao Qiansun
- Ngai Wai as Xue Muhua
- Mak Ka-lun as Zhaixingzi
- Chan Min-leung as Chuchenzi
- Liu Lailai as Granny Yu
- Cheung Ying-choi as Huangmei
- Choi Kwok-hing as Kurong
- Chan Chung-kin as Benyin
- Ling Hon as Benguan
- Au Ngok as Bencan
- Suen Gwai-hing as Xuanku
- Lee Hoi-sang as Xuantong
- Sit Chun-kei as Xuannan
- Lui Kim-kwong as Xuanji
- Shek Wun as Xuandu
- Ho Pik-kin as Xuanmie
- Tsang Kin-ming as Xuansheng
- Wong Tsung-chi as Yuangen
- Kwong Tso-fai as Huilun
- Ngai Wai-mun as Huifang
- Wong Sing-sheung as Huiyuan
- Wong Chung-kuang as Huijing
- Tong Chun-ming as Xuzhan
- Cheung Hak as Xuyuan
- Mak Tzi-wun as You Ji
- Siu Cheuk-yiu as You Ju
- Chan Tik-hak as Bao Qianling
- Leung Kin-ping as Qi Laoliu
- Leung Yan-kei as Xiang Wanghai
- Wah Chung-nam as Shan Zheng
- Lok Hung as Zongzan
- Lai Hsuen as the Liao empress dowager
- Tsang Wai-wun as the Liao empress
- Cheng Pak-lun as Wanyan Aguda
- Chan Chi-hung as Helibo
- Wong Man-biu as Zhong Wanchou
- Yeung Tze-to as Zuo Zimu
- Ma Hoi-lun as Xin Shuangqing
- Yoe Biu as Gong Guangjie
- Cheung Hung-cheung as Sikong Xuan
- Cheng Lui as Wu Laoda
- Kwan Jing as Buping Daoren
- Tang Yu-wing as Sang Tugong
- Tam Yat-ching as Zhiguang
- Kiu Hung as Qiao Sanhuai
- Lau Kwai-fong as Qiao Sanhuai's wife
- Lee Lung-kei as Helian Tieshu
- Fong Kit as Nu'erhai
