= Hu Jun =

Chinese actor

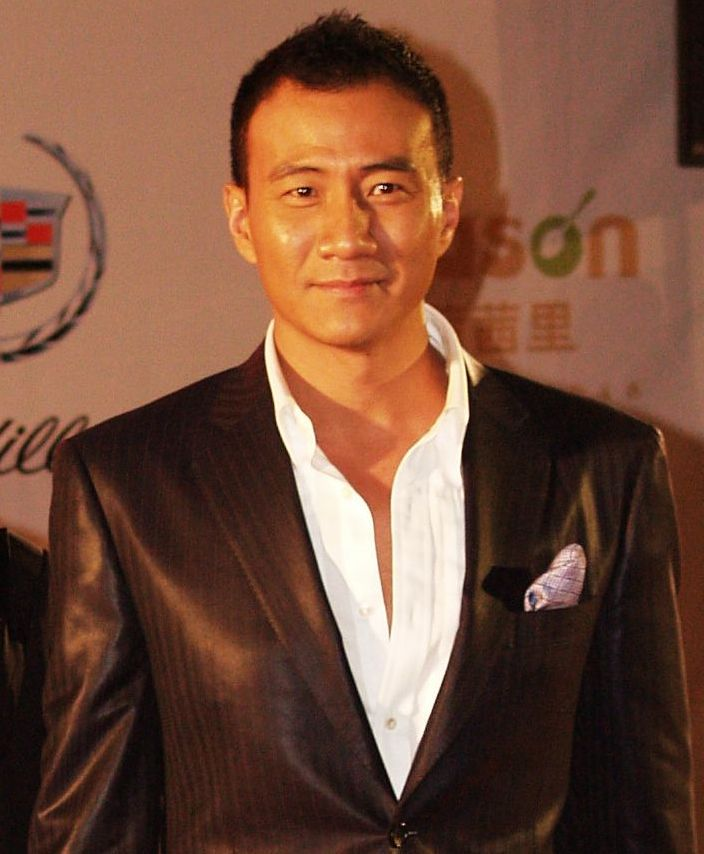
- Hu at the 2007 Shanghai International Film Festival
- Born: 18 March 1968 (age 58); Beijing, China
- Occupation: Actor
- Years active: 1990–present
- Height: 184 cm (6 ft 0 in)
- Spouse: Lu Fang (1999–present)
- Children: Hu Jiujiu (胡九九); Hu Haokang (胡皓康)
- Parent(s): Hu Baoshan (胡宝善); Wang Yiman (王亦满)
- Relatives: Aunt: Hu Xin (胡昕); Uncle: Hu Songhua (胡松华)
- Family: Hu Lan (胡岚); Hu Rong (胡蓉)
- Awards: Golden Bauhinia Awards – Best Actor; 2002 Lan Yu

Chinese name
- Traditional Chinese: 胡軍
- Simplified Chinese: 胡军
Transcriptions
Standard Mandarin
- Hanyu Pinyin: Hú Jūn
Yue: Cantonese
- Jyutping: Wu4 Gwan1
- Musical career

Signature
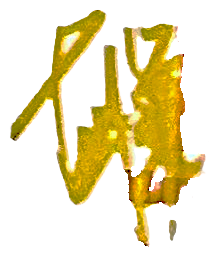

Hu Jun (born March 18, 1968) is a Chinese actor best known for playing dramatic roles in various films and television series. He has acted in a number of Hong Kong films.

== Biography ==
Hu Jun was born on March 18, 1968, to Wang Yiman (王亦满), a drama actress, and Hu Baoshan (胡宝善), a singer. His uncle Hu Songhua (胡松华) is a tenor singer. He has an aunt named Hu Xin (胡昕). Hu has two sisters, Hu Lan (胡岚) and Hu Rong (胡蓉).

In 1999, Hu Jun married Lu Fang (卢芳), a drama actress from Central Academy of Drama. Their daughter, Hu Jiujiu (胡九九), was born on September 9, 2001; their son, Hu Haokang (胡皓康), was born on November 11, 2008.

== Filmography ==
=== Film ===
Year	Title	Role	Notes	Ref.
1990	烈火恩怨	Cai Xiuming		
1990	恶狼与天使	Zhu Ge		
1991	Black Snow 黑雪	Lu Liang		
1992	Black Fire 黑火	Zhang Wu		
1993	狂心灭情	Dawei		
1994	怒海红颜	Long Er		
1995	Singer 歌手			
1996	East Palace, West Palace	Shi Xiaojun		
1996	燃烧的欲望	Xu Wenzheng		
1997	红娘	Du Que		
1998	冲天飞豹	Ling Zhiyuan		
2001	平原枪声	Ma Ying		
2002	Lan Yu	Chen Handong		
2002	Golden Chicken	Ip Chi Kon		
2003	Infernal Affairs II	SP Luk		
2005	Everlasting Regret	Li Zhongde		
2006	Curiosity Kills the Cat	Zheng Zhong		
2006	Getting Home	Trucker		
2007	Fish's Tear 鱼不在水里	Cheng Yu		
2007	Assembly	Liu Zeshui		
2007	The One Man Olympics 一个人的奥林匹克	Zhang Xueliang		
2008	Kung Fu Cyborg	Xu Dachun		
2008	Red Cliff	Zhao Yun		
2009	The Founding of a Republic	Gu Zhutong		
2009	Mulan	Mendu		
2009	Bodyguards and Assassins	Yan Xiaoguo		
2009	The Robbers 我的唐朝兄弟	Xue Shisan		
2009	Energy Behind the Heart 用心跳			
2010	Let the Bullets Fly	Zhang Mazi		
2012	Wreck-It Ralph	Wreck-It Ralph	Mandarin version	
2013	Firestorm	Cao Nan		
2014	As the Light Goes Out	Hai Yang		
2015	Cairo Declaration	Shi Jianfeng		
2016	The Bodyguard	Wang Juzhang	Cameo	
2017	Lord of Shanghai 上海王	Chang Lixiong		
2018	Genghis Khan	Kuchlug		
2018	Shadow	Yang Cang		
2019	Love Song to the Days Forgone 东北往事之二十年			
2019	The Composer 音乐家	Xian Xinghai		
2019	Song of the Assassins 刺局			
2019	Song of Youth 老师·好		Cameo	
2019	My People, My Country	Luo Ruiqing		
2019	Battle of Golden Triangle 激战金三角			
2021	The Battle at Lake Changjin	Lei Suisheng		
2022	The Battle at Lake Changjin II	Lei Suisheng		
2023	Born to Fly	Zhang Ting		
2025	Legends of the Condor Heroes: The Gallants	Hong Qigong		

=== Television series ===
Year	English title	Chinese title	Role	Notes	Ref.
1994		费家有女	Gao Jianshe		
1995	Kingdoms of the Spring and Autumn Period of the Eastern Zhou Dynasty	东周列国·春秋篇	Hua Yuan		
1995	Chinese Model	中国模特			
1996		辩护律师			
1996		北京深秋的故事	Xu Wenzheng		
1997		危情時刻	Qin Chuan		
1997		丽人公寓			
1997		商海潮情			
1997		活得潇洒			
1998		真情如梦			
1998		人生本色			
1998		签约季节			
1998		老虎棒子鸡			
1998	The Railway Station	候车大厅	Maomao		
1999		沧海情仇	Liu Tianlong		
1999		我心换你心	Li Yuetian		
1999		驚濤	Li Guilin		
2000		关怀			
2001	Black Triangle	黑三角	Cheng Hao		
2001		天网孽情	Li Yidong		
2002	Undercover	卧底	Wu Jianwei		
2002	Chinese Soccer	中国足球	Yu Yi		
2002		热血痴心	Gao Han		
2003	Demi-Gods and Semi-Devils	天龙八部	Qiao Feng		
2003	Painting Soul	画魂	Pan Zanhua		
2003	Ballad of Kangding	康定情歌	Luo Sang		
2005	The River Flows Eastwards	一江春水向东流	Zhang Zhongliang		
2006	The Story of Han Dynasty	楚汉风云	Xiang Yu		
2006	Founding Emperor of Ming Dynasty	朱元璋	Zhu Yuanzhang		
2007	The Great Revival	卧薪尝胆	King Fuchai of Wu		
2007	Xi'an Incident	西安事变	Zhang Xueliang		
2009		玉井传奇	Qi Jiguang		
2010		岁月	Liang Zhiyuan		
2010	Golden Anniversary II	金婚风雨情	Geng Zhi		
2011	Enemies Among Us	风语	Lu Congjun		
2011	China 1921	中国1921	Li Dazhao		
2012	A Lone Hero	孤军英雄	Che Daokuan		
2012	Scent of a Woman	青春四十	Hu Zhendong		
2013	Old Days in Shanghai	像火花像蝴蝶	Yin Shaorong		
2013	The Legend of Kublai Khan	忽必烈传奇	Kublai Khan		
2014	Mainland and Island	大陆小岛	Qin Tianliang		
2014	New Leopard	雪豹坚强岁月	Rong Ge	Cameo	
2015	In the Silence	于无声处	Ma Dong		
2015	Truth and Trust	后海不是海	Bo De	Cameo	
2016	Before Dawn	潜伏在黎明之前	Hu Zhanping		
2017	Little Valentine	小情人	Dan Zifei		
2018	Ever Night	将夜	Xia Hou		
2020	Hunting	猎狐	Yang Jianqun		
2020	Reunion: The Sound of the Providence	重启之极海听雷	Wu Erbai		
2020	Snow Leopard 2	雪豹2			
2021	Sword Snow Stride	雪中悍刀行	Xu Xiao		
2021	Love in Flames of War	良辰好景知几何	Xiao Hai Shan		

== Theatre ==
Year	Title	Role	Notes	Ref.
2018	The Tragedy of Hamlet, Prince of Denmark 哈姆雷特	Hamlet	Directed by Li Liuyi in collaboration with the Royal Shakespeare Company	
2025	Thunderstorm 雷雨	Zhou Puyuan	Directed by Li Liuyi	

== Awards and nominations ==
Year	Award	Category	Role	Results	Ref.
2002	7th Golden Bauhinia Awards	Best Actor	Lan Yu		
2002	2nd Chinese Film Media Awards	Best Actor	Lan Yu		
2002	2nd Chinese Film Media Awards	Most Popular Actor	Lan Yu		
2004	22nd China TV Golden Eagle Award	Best Actor	Demi-Gods and Semi-Devils		
2016	8th Macau International Movie Festival	Best Actor	Lord of Shanghai		
2019	3rd Golden Screen Awards	Best Actor			
