= Gao Shengtai =

Gao Shengtai 高昇泰

Emperor of Dazhong
- Reign: 1094–1096
- Predecessor: Duan Zhengming (of Dali)
- Successor: Emperor Zhongzong (of Dali)
- Died: 1096
- Issue: Gao Taiming (高泰明); Gao Taiyun (高泰運); Gao Taihui (高泰慧)
Full name
- Family name: Gāo (高); Given name: Shēngtài (昇泰)
Era dates
- Shangzhi (上治): 1094–1096
Posthumous name
- Emperor Fuyou Shengde Biaozheng (富有聖德表正皇帝)
- Dynasty: Dazhong (大中)
- Father: Gao Zhisheng (高智昇)

Gao Shengtai
- Chinese: 高昇泰
Transcriptions
Standard Mandarin
- Hanyu Pinyin: Gāo Shēngtài

Gao Shengtai (died 1096) was the founder and the only emperor of the short-lived Dazhong Kingdom from 1094 until his death in 1096. He was from Cang Mountain in the present-day southern Chinese province of Yunnan.

== Life ==
In 1080, Duan Lianyi, the 12th ruler of the Dali Kingdom, was overthrown and killed by Yang Yizhen, who seized the throne from him. Gao Shengtai and his father, Gao Zhisheng, the Marquis of Shanchan (in present-day Kunming, Yunnan), led military forces to attack Yang Yizhen and defeated him. They restored the Dali monarchy by installing Duan Shouhui on the throne.

However, in 1081, Gao Zhisheng and Gao Shengtai forced Duan Shouhui to abdicate and replaced him with Duan Zhengming.

In 1094, Gao Shengtai forced Duan Zhengming to relinquish the throne to him, after which he renamed the Dali Kingdom to "Dazhong Kingdom" with the era name "Shangzhi".

=== Death ===
He died of illness in 1096. Before his death, he instructed his son, Gao Taiming, to return the throne to the Duan family. Duan Zhengchun, Duan Zhengming's younger brother, became the new ruler and he restored the kingdom's former name. In spite of this power transition, Gao Shengtai's relatives and descendants still occupied highly influential positions in the Dali Kingdom after his death. Gao Shengtai was given the posthumous name "Emperor Fuyou Shengde Biaozheng".

== In fiction ==
Gao Shengtai is fictionalised as a minor character in the wuxia novel Demi-Gods and Semi-Devils by Louis Cha.
