= Demi-Gods and Semi-Devils (1982 TV series) =

1982 Hong Kong TV series

- Cover art for the new complete version released on DVD
- 天龍八部
- Genre: Wuxia
- Based on: Demi-Gods and Semi-Devils by Jin Yong
- Screenplay by: Chiu Chi-kin; Tang Yun-leung; Kwan Chin-bok; Leung Chi-wah; Lee Chak-keung; Shum Sai-sing; Cheung Mun-fung; Sum Kwok-wing; Leung Wing-mui; Tsang Gan-cheung; Lo Hon-wah; Tang Kei-pui; Leung Kin-cheung; Wai Ka-fai
- Directed by: Fan Sau-ming; Siu Hin-fai; Lee Kwok-lap; Poon Man-kit; Leung Yat-yuet; Tam Jui-ming; Sze-to Lap-kwong
- Starring: Bryan Leung; Kent Tong; Felix Wong; Idy Chan; Wong Hang-sau; Chan Fuk-sang; Sharon Yeung
- Theme music composer: Joseph Koo; Leung Hon-ming
- Opening theme: "Forgotten in the Mists" (倆忘煙水裏) by Michael Kwan and Susanna Kwan; "Traverse Rivers and Mountains" (萬水千山縱橫) by Michael Kwan
- Country of origin: Hong Kong
- Original language: Cantonese
- No. of seasons: 2
- No. of episodes: 50

Production
- Executive producer: Siu Sang
- Production location: Hong Kong
- Editors: Chiu Chi-kin; Leung Kin-cheung
- Running time: ≈42 minutes per episode
- Production company: TVB

Original release
- Network: TVB Jade
- Release: 22 March – 30 July 1982

Demi-Gods and Semi-Devils (天龍八部) is a 1982 Hong Kong wuxia television series adapted from the novel of the same title by Jin Yong. Produced by TVB, the 50-episode-long series is divided into two parts, with their Chinese titles as 天龍八部之六脈神劍 (Demi-Gods and Semi-Devils: Six Meridians Divine Sword) for the first 30 episodes and 天龍八部之虛竹傳奇 (Demi-Gods and Semi-Devils: The Legend of Xuzhu) for the remaining 20 episodes.

== Cast ==
- Bryan Leung as Qiao Feng
- Kent Tong as Duan Yu
- Felix Wong as Xuzhu
- Idy Chan as Wang Yuyan
- Wong Hang-sau as Azhu / Zhong Ling
- Chan Fuk-sang as Azi
- Sharon Yeung as Mu Wanqing
- Shek Sau as Murong Fu
- Patrick Tse as Duan Zhengchun
- Leung Shan as Dao Baifeng
- Maggie Li as Madam Wang
- Lui Yau-wai as Gan Baobao
- Yan Pak as Ruan Xingzhu
- Bonnie Wong as Qin Hongmian
- Lam Kin-ming as Kang Min
- Lau Siu Ming as Duan Yanqing
- Leung Oi as Ye Erniang
- Lau Kwok-shing as Yue Laosan
- Yeung Yim-tong as Yun Zhonghe
- Kam Kwok-wai as You Tanzhi
- Cheung Ying-choi as Duan Zhengming
- Shih Kien as Xiao Yuanshan
- Kwan Hoi-san as Murong Bo
- Lee Heung-kam as Duan Zhengming's wife
- Ju Gong as Chu Wanli
- Ho Lai-nam as Zhu Danchen
- Wong Man-yee as Abi
- Ma Hing-sang as Deng Baichuan
- Eddy Ko as Gongye Gan
- Yu Tsi-ming as Bao Butong
- Chiu Hung as Feng Bo'e
- Tsui Sun-yee as Ma Dayuan
- Kwan Chung as Quan Guanqing
- Robert Siu as Bai Shijing
- Gam Lui as Elder Xu
- Bak Man-biu as a Beggar Clan elder
- Yu Mun-bing as Elder Wu
- Au Ngok as Elder Chen
- Suen Kwai-hing as Elder Xi
- Tsui Gin-shun as Elder Song
- Cheung Lui as Jiumozhi
- Bobby Tsang as Zhong Wanchou
- Ho Pik-kin as Xuanci
- Kong Ngai as Xuanku
- Chan Tor-kit as Xuannan
- Chan Chung-kin as Xuanji
- Cheng Ka-sang as Xuankong
- Ng Yip-kwong as Shan Zheng
- Tam Yat-ching as Tan Gong
- Chan Lap-pan as Tan Po
- Yu Ming as Zhao Qiansun
- Benz Hui as Zuo Zimu
- Cheng Lai-fun as Xin Shuangqing
- Choi Kwok-hing as Sikong Xuan
- Mak Chi-wun as Gan Guanghao
- Ng Ka-lai as Ge Guangpei
- Yeung Chak-lam as Yelü Hongji
- Yip Ha-lee as the Sweeper Monk
- Cheng Kun-sin as Wuyazi
- Wong Oi-ming as Tianshan Tonglao
- Lai Siu-fong as Li Qiushui
- Lau Hak-suen as Ding Chunqiu
- Lee Kong as Zhaixingzi
- Lee Sau-kei as Su Xinghe
- King Toi-yum as Princess Yinchuan
- Lee Kwok-lun as Zongzan
- Felix Lok as Helian Tieshu
- Kenneth Tsang as the Western Xia ruler
- Kwan Kin as Xue Muhua
- Ma Chung-tak as You Ju
- Unicorn Chan as You Ji
- Kwan Tat-chuen as Bao Qianling
- Yip Tin-hang as Xiang Wanghai / Nu'erhai
- Pui Wun as the Liao empress dowager
- Lau Nga-lai as the Liao empress
- Ng Yan-chi as Yelü Chongyuan
- Lee Kin-chuen as Yelü Nielugu
- Cheng Yau-kwok as Huangmei
- Wong Hak as Kurong
- Leung Sheung-wun as Benyin
- Ho Hin-sui as Benguan
- Ling Lai-mun as Bencan
