= Idy Chan =

Hong Kong TV actress

- Born: 25 March 1960 (age 66); British Hong Kong
- Occupations: Actress; entrepreneur
- Years active: 1977–1993; 2007–present

Chinese name
- Traditional Chinese: 陳玉蓮
- Simplified Chinese: 陈玉莲
Transcriptions
Standard Mandarin
- Hanyu Pinyin: Chén Yùlián
Yue: Cantonese
- Jyutping: Chan4 Yuk6 Lin4
- Musical career
- Also known as: Lin mui (蓮妹)

Idy Chan Yuk Lin (born 25 March 1960) is a popular Hong Kong TV actress, especially during the 1980s and was named as one of the "Five Beauties of TVB".

== Career ==
She started performing in 1977. She is most famous for her portrayal of three of the characters from the three dramas of Jin Yong are her heavenly role of Xiaolongnü along with Andy Lau as Yang Guo in the 1983 TVB adaptation of Louis Cha's Wuxia novel The Return of the Condor Heroes, Wang Yuyan on The Demi-Gods and Semi-Devils (1982), and as the innocent Xiaozhao with Adam Cheng as Zhang Wuji on The Heaven Sword and Dragon Saber (1978).

In 1982, she also portrayed Wang Yuyan in television and film adaptations of Demi-Gods and Semi-Devils. Idy was more popular in her small screen work, however she was in many good films from the early 1980s to the early 1990s like Casino Raiders.

Off-screen, the long 5-year (1978–1983) romance between Idy and Chow Yun-fat also made headlines in the early days of their TV careers. The shooting of the TVB series The Return of the Condor Heroes resulted in Andy Lau's unrequited love with her. Idy also settled in New York, U.S. during her short marriage with business man Peter Chan Siu-Moo.

In 1988, She played Huang Rong in Taiwan CTV's The Legend of the Condor Heroes (1988).

Idy Chan has become less active since 1993. In 2007, she returned to shoot the TVB series Catch Me Now, which also marked her comeback. Ever since, she occasionally appears on TV shows in Mainland China and Hong Kong. Besides running her own and family businesses in advertising and restaurant, she's also an active volunteer of many charities.

== Lottery streak ==
Within Hong Kong culture she is known to have won the lottery multiple times. One of the most publicized response was in the 2007 episode of Be My Guest. She was interviewed by Stephen Chan Chi Wan, who asked whether winning the Canadian lottery of 17 million and Hong Kong lottery of 30 million dollars was true. She deflected the question hoping to answer it in private.

== Filmography ==
=== Television series ===
Year	Chinese & English Title	Role	Notes
2012	Silver Spoon, Sterling Shackles 名媛望族	Yee-yin	TVB 45th Anniversary Drama
2012	Love Thy Family 愛回家		
2008	Catch Me Now 原來愛上賊	Bao Yung-Yung	
1993	Can't Stop Loving You 愛到盡頭		Telemovie
1992	Thief of Time 群星會		TVB 25th Anniversary Special
1992	The Key Man 巨人		
1992	Red Lanterns Hanging High 大紅燈籠高高挂		(CTS)
1991	Days of Glory 豪門		(aTV)
1991	Queen Singer 賽金花		(TTV)
1990	Yesterday, Today, and Tomorrow 玉梨魂		Telemovie
1988	The Legend of the Condor Heroes 射雕英雄傳	Huang Rong	
1987	The Grand Canal 大運河		TVB 20th Anniversary Series
1986	The Upheaval 小島風雲		
1985	Pink Lady (lit.) 紅粉佳人		
1985	The Battlefield 楚河漢界	Consort Yu	
1985	The Brave Squad 好女當差		
1984	Love Me, Love Me Not 信是有緣		
1983	The Return of the Condor Heroes 神鵰俠侶	Siu-lung-nui	
1983	In The Same Boat 四海一家		
1982	The Wild Bunch 十三太保		
1982	Demi-Gods and Semi-Devils I & II 天龍八部 之 六貾神劍 - 虛竹傳奇	Wong Yu-yin	
1981	The Hawk 飛鷹		
1981	Come Rain, Come Shine 風雨晴		
1980	This Land Is Mine 風雲		
1979	Chor Lau-heung 楚留香 之 無花傳奇 - 最後一戦		
1979	The Twins 絕代雙驕		
1978	The Heaven Sword and Dragon Saber 倚天屠龍記	Siu-chiu	
1978	Vanity Fair 大亨		
1997	Below the Lion Rock 獅子山下		

=== Films ===
- The Way We Are 天水圍的日輿夜 (2008) - Cameo
- A Warrior's Tragedy 邊城浪子 (1993)
- The Monks From Shaolin 智勇和尚 (1992)
- Sisters of the World Unite 莎莎嘉嘉站起來 (1991)
- Blood Stained Tradewind 血在風上 (1990)
- Whampoa Blues 壯志豪情 (1990)
- Yesterday, Today, and Tomorrow 玉梨魂 (1990) ATV
- Kawashima Yoshiko 川島芳子 (1990)
- Stage Door Johnny 舞台姊妹 (1990)
- L'Air du Temps 時代之風 (1990)
- Casino Raiders 至尊無上 (1989)
- Maybe Next Time 緣份游戲 (1989)
- Rule of the Game 遊戲規則 (1989)
- Graveside Story 夜半奇談之紅衣女 (1988) ATV
- The Crazy Companies 最佳損友 (1988)
- Edge Of Darkness 陷阱邊沿 (1988)
- I Am Sorry 說謊的女人 (1988)
- On the Run 亡命鴛鴦 (1988)
- The Siamese Twins 連體 (1984)
- Demi-Gods and Semi-Devils 天龍八部 (1984)
- Last Night's Light 昨夜之燈 (1983)
- The Sweet and Sour Cops Part II 摩登雜差 (1982)
- Shaolin and Wu Tang 少林與武當 (1981)
- The Extras 茄哩啡 (1978)
