= Demi-Gods and Semi-Devils film city =

Coordinates: 25°40′48″N 100°08′58″E

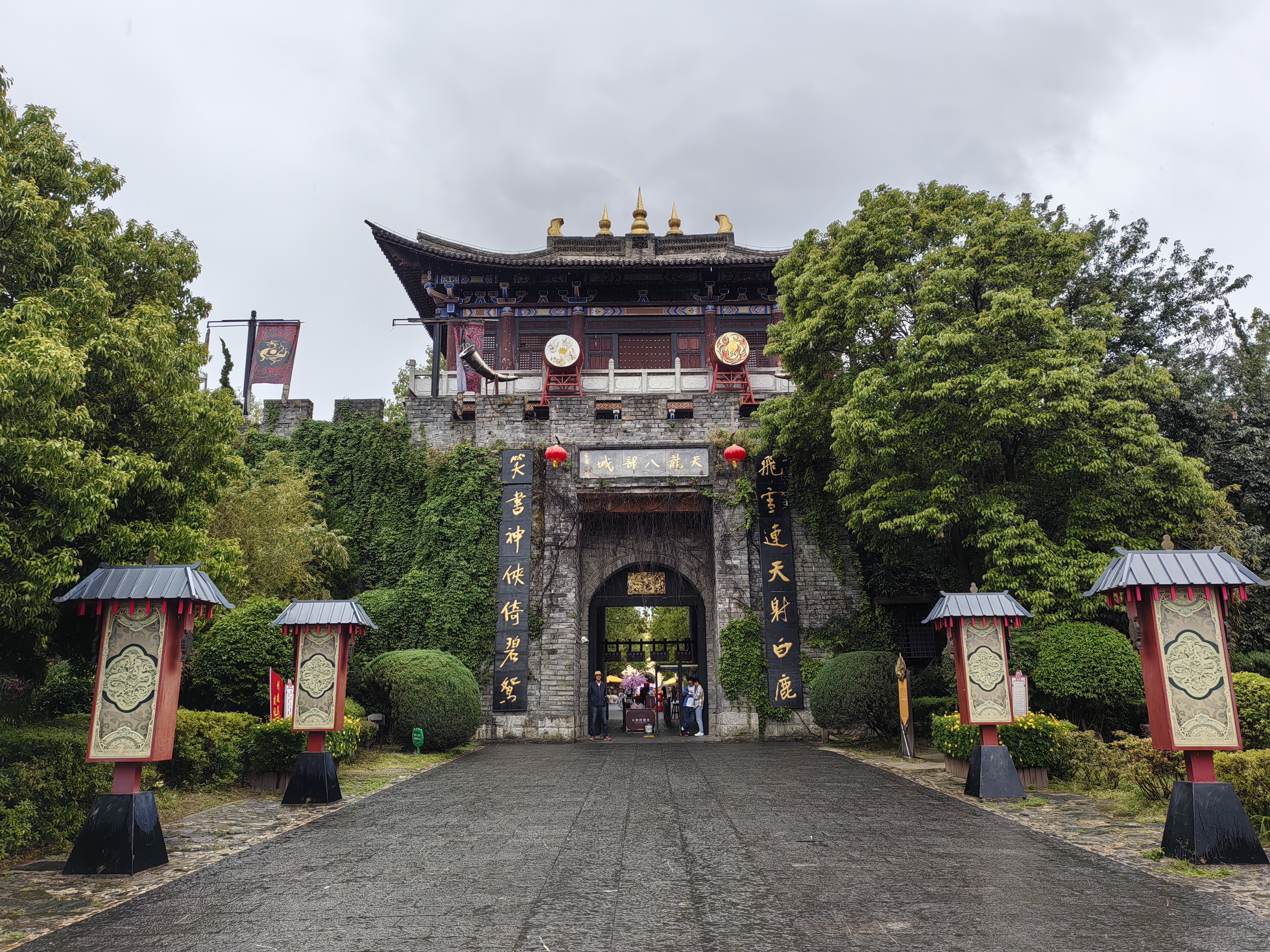

The Demi-Gods and Semi-Devils film city (天龍八部影視城, English: Tian Long Ba Bu Movie City) is an artificial Chinese ancient city built in Dali City, Yunnan, China.

== History ==
The city was originally built to accommodate the shooting of the television series Demi-Gods and Semi-Devils (天龍八部). The city cost 110 million RMB to construct. The park covers an area size of 700 mu (畝). The park was opened in 2002 with different stages of constructions.

== Attractions ==
The city has sections demonstrating different dynasties such as Song, Western Xia or Liao. Tourists can pick up replica weapons for closer examination. Visitors to the imperial palace can also pay a fee to don the emperor's robes and sit on the throne.
