= Li Liuyi =

Chinese director and playwright

Li Liuyi (Chinese: 李六乙) is a Chinese director and playwright of Beijing People's Art Theatre. His theory "Pure Drama" and his related exploration in the field are known as "Li Liuyi Methodology", which is widely acclaimed and researched. Japanese modern theater master Tadashi Suzuki (Japanese: 鈴木忠志) calls him "The most influential stage artist of Asia in the new century".

== Early life ==
Li Liuyi was born into an opera family in 1961. He did research in the Chinese National Academy of Arts for eight years. He has directed numerous genres of drama with distinguished regional characteristics, including Kunqu Opera, Peking Opera, Sichuan opera, Henan Opera, Pingju Opera, Liu Opera, Liuqin tune and Meihu Opera.

== Participation in international artistic events ==
Li Liuyi has been invited to different international art festivals and commissioned to create new productions. He was once invited by the City of Linz—the European Capital of Culture in 2009 to direct the opera The Land of Smiles in Linz State Theatre. He became the first Chinese director to set foot in the world of mainstream European opera. Li directed and put the "Heroine" trilogy on stage for the opening ceremony of Holland Festival and was received by the Queen of the Netherlands.

He cooperated with the National Ballet of China, adapted and directed the ballet The Peony Pavilion. The ballet was one of the opening performances in the Edinburgh International Festival, which marked an important breakthrough for China's performing arts scene, as it meant Chinese performances were now being staged in major European art festivals.

== Representative works of drama as a director ==
- Thunderstorm (2025)
- The Tragedy of Hamlet, Prince of Denmark (in collaboration with the Royal Shakespeare Company, 2018-2020)|
- Antigone and Oedipus Rex ("Outstanding Director's Drama Series: Li Liuyi", April 2014, the National Grand Theater, Beijing)
- The Savage Land (The fifth Beijing International Music Festival, October 29, 2012)
- Death of a Salesman (People's Art Theatre, Beijing, April 2012)
- The Song of the Earth (Symphony originally written by Mahler; Cooperated with the China Philharmonic Orchestra, October 2012)
- The Family (Originally written by Ba Jin and adapted by Cao Yu; People's Art Theatre, Beijing, July 2011)
- The Golden Cangue (Modern Peking opera, December 2010; won Outstanding Director Award and Outstanding Drama Award in the Twelfth Chinese Opera Festival)
- Mei Lanfang Classics (Peking opera; Zhengyici Peking Opera Theatre (Chinese: 正乙祠戏楼), May 2010)
- The Peony Pavilion (invited by The Corps de Ballet of China to direct this ballet and cooperated with Japanese costume designer Emi Wada [Japanese: ワダ・エミ or 和田恵美子])
- The Story of Puppets (Kunqu Opera; cooperated with Japanese director Hideo Kanze [Japanese: 観世栄夫])
- The "Heroine" Trilogy Mu Guiying, Hua Mulan, Liang Hongyu (New Peking Opera, 2003)
- The Good Person of Szechwan (Originally written by Bertolt Brecht; a Chinese Sichuan opera, 1987)

== Representative works of drama as a playwright ==
Critics consider Li Liuyi a playwright with lasting literary creativity. His works of drama include: three small theatre works -- Blue Sky After Rain, Mahjong, and Songat Midnight; the "Heroine" Trilogy Mu Guiying, Hua Mulan, Liang Hongyu; See Lu Xun Again, 2003, Time Passed by; The Life of a Peking Policeman (adapted from Lao She's novel); Fortress Besieged (adapted from Qian Zhongshu's novel); Spring in a Small Town (adapted from Fei Mu's film); Ballet The Peony Pavilion (adapted from Tang Xianzu's Kunqun Opera). His book Li Liuyi's Pure Drama· Collection of Dramas has been published by the People 's Literature Publishing House in China, translated into many languages and published worldwide.

== Drama project "Li Liuyi • China Made" (2012-2015) ==
In 2012, Li Liuyi launched the drama project "Li Liuyi • China Made". The project includes three works of ancient Greek tragedy, Antigone, Oedipus Rex, and Prometheus Bound, and the Chinese epic King Gesar (I, II and III). Antigone and Oedipus Rex have been performed in public. Prometheus Bound will be launched early next year in 2015.

As stated in its programme note, "Re-assuming the responsibility of being a practitioner of drama", Li Liuyi's Antigone has realized a kind of "self-awareness"—it stands at the crossroad of Chinese experience and Western classics and has completed a conversation with the times and the world.

As a contemporary Chinese director, Li Liuyi has successfully caught the soul of the Ancient Greek classic drama through his "translated" work of drama -- Oedipus Rex. He broke through the high wall between the Oriental and Occidental cultures and civilizations, and seamlessly joined the thoughts and emotions of the people from the ancient and distant foreign land, and of the local people in the contemporary times.
