= Zhengyici Peking Opera Theatre =

Theatre in Beijing, China

Coordinates: 39.897404°N 116.379847°E

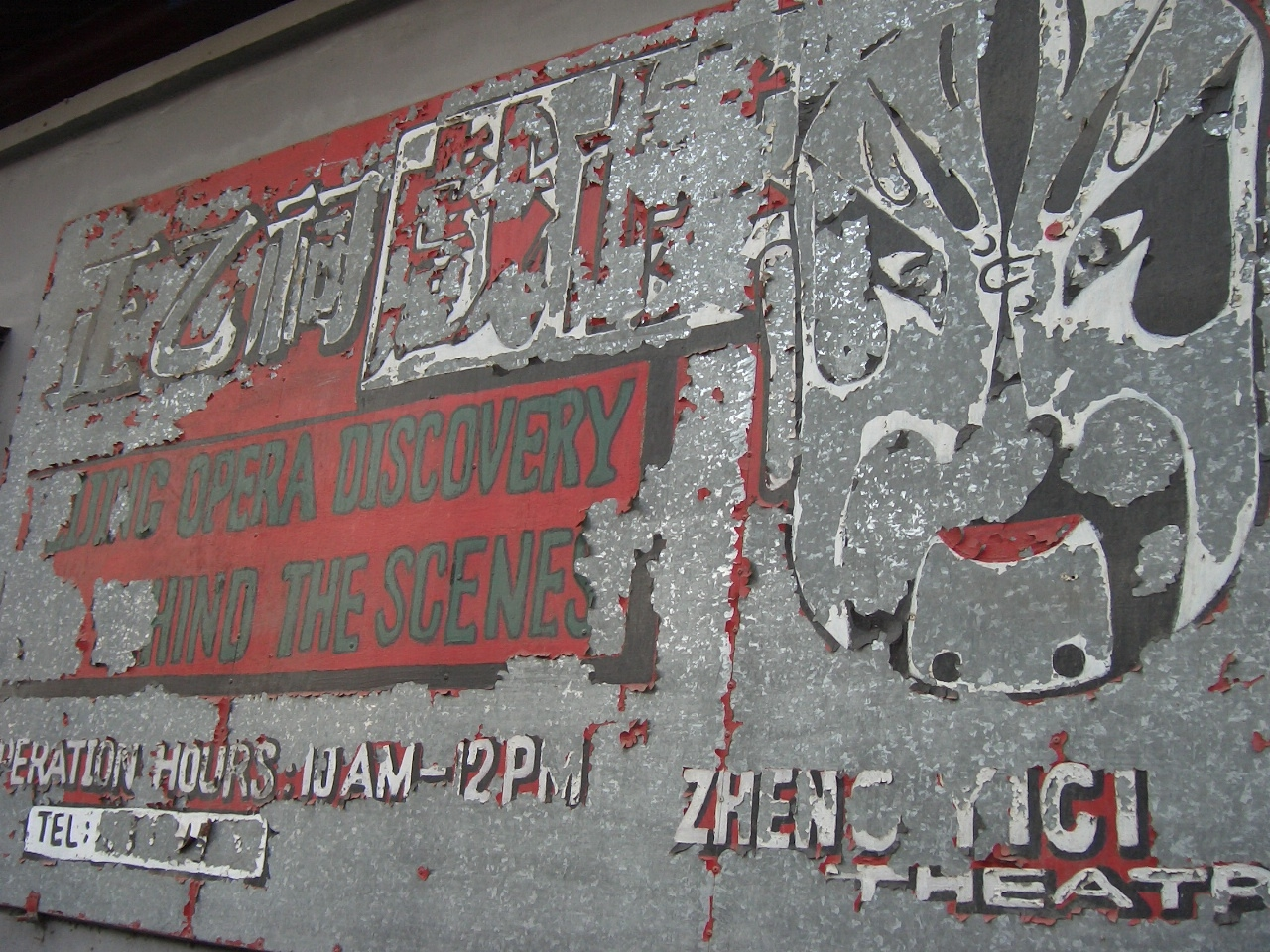

The Zhengyici Peking Opera Theatre (Chinese: 正乙祠戏楼; pinyin: Zhèngyǐcí Xìlóu), located on a hutong in the Xuanwu District of Beijing, is one of the best-known Beijing opera theatres. It is also one of the oldest wooden theatres in China. Zhengyici means a temple (ci) for Zhengyi Xuantan Laozu (正乙玄坛老祖).

== History ==
The theatre was built in 1688, during the reign of the Kangxi Emperor of the Qing dynasty. It was built on the ruin site of a Buddhist temple. It has a rich history that includes performances by the grandmaster of Peking Opera, Mei Lanfang.

After the Cultural Revolution, the theatre fell into disrepair. However, in 1995 a local businessman sponsored a full restoration. The theatre now continues to perform Beijing Opera. It is considered a living relic and one of Beijing's finest monuments.

In August 2005, the theatre was temporarily closed for building work. As of October 2010, the theatre was all set to reopen, with the premiere of Mei Lanfang Classics, providing a view of Peking Opera in its heyday. The play includes six classics from the 160 repertoires of Mei Lanfang, including Battle with Invaders, Drunken Princess, Goddess of Luo River, Taking Command of Troops, Sylph Scattering Flowers, and Farewell to Princess Yu.

On June 10, 2012, the theatre played host to American comedian Louis CK, who taped an episode of his show Louie there to an invitation-only audience.
