= Shaolin Sect =

Fictional martial arts sect

- Chinese: 少林派
Transcriptions
Standard Mandarin
- Hanyu Pinyin: Shàolín Paì
Yue: Cantonese
- Jyutping: Siu^{3}-Lam^{4} Paai^{3}

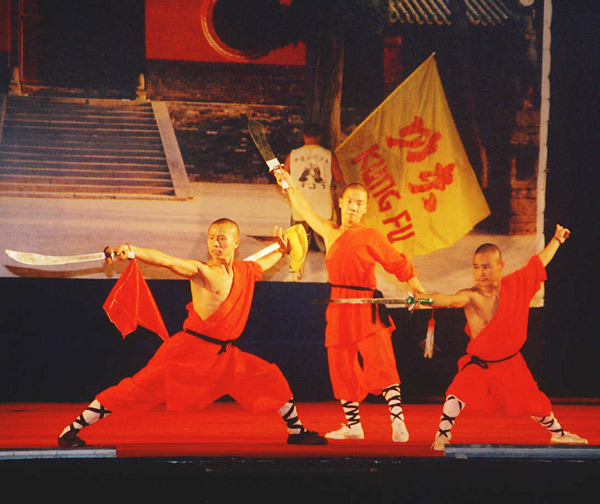
Shaolin show

The Shaolin Sect or Shaolin School (少林派), sometimes also referred to as Shaolin Monastery or Shaolin Temple, is a fictional martial arts sect or school mentioned in several works of wuxia fiction. It is commonly featured as one of the leading orthodox sects in the wulin (martial artists' community) and based in Shaolin Monastery.

== History ==
The Shaolin Sect was founded during the Five Dynasties and Ten Kingdoms period by the Buddhist monk Bodhidharma, who wanted his followers to practise martial arts for improving health and self-defence, as well as for more altruistic purposes such as protecting the weak and vulnerable. Shaolin members are also required to practise Chan Buddhism in addition to martial arts.

== Organisation ==
The Shaolin Sect is led by an abbot (方丈), who also oversees the monastery. Shaolin members are ranked by generation; each member of a certain generation has a prefix before his Dharma name to indicate his position in the hierarchy. For example, in Demi-Gods and Semi-Devils, the most senior generation is the Xuan (玄) generation. The abbot is Xuanci and the senior monks such as Xuanji, Xuannan, Xuandu, and Xuanku have a Xuan prefix in their Dharma names. One of three protagonists in the novel, Xuzhu, is from the Xu (虛) generation, which is two generations after the Xuans.

The sect is subdivided into several groups, which are in charge of different parts of the monastery or different aspects of daily activities. They include:

- Abbot's Vihāra (方丈精舍), the abbot's quarters.
- Bodhidharma Hall (達摩院), the training grounds for only Shaolin martial arts.
- Arhat Hall (羅漢堂), the meeting grounds with challengers from other sects.
- Prajñā Hall (般若院), another training grounds, where other sects' martial arts are also practised.
- Discipline Hall (戒律院), the group in charge of maintaining law and order in the sect.
- Bodhi Hall (菩提院), where the Yijin Jing is kept.
- Bhaishajyaraja Hall (藥王院), the hospital wing for the sick and injured.
- Śarīra Hall (舍利院), the crematorium.
- Guest Hall (知客院), the reception grounds for guests.
- Library (藏經閣), where Buddhist scriptures and martial arts manuals are kept.

== Martial arts ==
In wuxia fiction, there is a popular saying that all forms of Chinese martial arts originated from Shaolin (天下武功出少林). Shaolin is also highly regarded as a leading "orthodox" sect in the wulin. In Demi-Gods and Semi-Devils, it houses 72 powerful forms of martial arts; no one has managed to master all since Shaolin was founded. These martial arts have Buddhist names, such as "Bodhidharma's Palm" and "Arhat's Fist".

Shaolin also houses the Yijin Jing (易筋經), a manual instructing users how to master a certain technique to improve their prowess in all types of martial arts. It has also powerful healing properties if the user manages to master the skill. In Demi-Gods and Semi-Devils, You Tanzhi acquires the manual by chance and uses its skills to purge poison in his body after he is bitten by venomous creatures. The sutra also increases his neigong and stamina, allowing him to deliver a simple palm strike and produce an impact of several times stronger than the original force. In The Smiling, Proud Wanderer, Linghu Chong uses the skills in the manual to heal his internal wounds.

== Discontinued use of the name "Shaolin" in television series ==
The term "Shaolin Sect" was not used in two television series adapted from Jin Yong's novels. In The Heaven Sword and Dragon Saber, a 2009 television series adapted from the novel of the same title, the Shaolin Sect is referred to as the Monks' Sect (僧人派). In Swordsman, a 2013 television series adapted from The Smiling, Proud Wanderer, Shaolin Monastery is referred to as Divine Eagle Monastery (靈鷲寺).

Although some viewers have expressed dissatisfaction over the changes, the reasons behind the renaming are not made clear to the public. Some people believe that the producers wanted to avoid trademark infringement, since the real-life Shaolin Monastery, under Shi Yongxin's leadership, has officially registered "Shaolin" as a trademark and has been involved in lawsuits with commercial companies over the use of "Shaolin" as a brand name or trademark.

== See also ==
- Shaolin Kung Fu
- Shaolin Monastery
- Southern Shaolin Monastery
