= Duan Zhengming =

Emperor Baoding of Dali 大理保定帝

Emperor of Dali
- Reign: 1081–1094
- Predecessor: Duan Shouhui
- Successor: Gao Shengtai (of Dazhong)
- Regent: Gao Shengtai
Full name
- Family name: Duan (段); Given name: Zhengming (正明)
Era dates
- Baoli (保立): 1082; Jian'an (建安): 1083–1091; Tianyou (天祐): 1091–1094
Posthumous name
- Emperor Baoding (保定皇帝)
- Dynasty: Dali

Duan Zhengming
- Chinese: 段正明
Transcriptions
Standard Mandarin
- Hanyu Pinyin: Duàn Zhèngmíng

Duan Zhengming, also known by his posthumous name as the Emperor Baoding of Dali, was the 14th emperor of the Dali Kingdom. In 1081, Gao Zhisheng and his son, Gao Shengtai, forced Duan Zhengming's predecessor, Duan Shouhui (Emperor Shangming), to abdicate and replaced him with Duan Zhengming. In 1094, Gao Shengtai forced Duan Zhengming to relinquish the throne to him and renamed the Dali Kingdom to "Dazhong Kingdom". Gao Shengtai ruled briefly until his death in 1096, after which the throne was returned to the Duan family – Duan Zhengming's younger brother, Duan Zhengchun, became the new ruler and restored the kingdom's former name.

== In fiction ==
Duan Zhengming is fictionalised as a minor character in the wuxia novel Demi-Gods and Semi-Devils by Louis Cha.
