= Duan Heyu =

16th Emperor of Dali Kingdom

Emperor Xianzong of Dali 大理憲宗

Emperor of Dali
- Reign: 1108–1147
- Predecessor: Duan Zhengchun
- Successor: Duan Zhengxing
- Grand Chancellors: Gao Taiming (高泰明) (1108–1116); Gao Taiyun (高泰運) (1116–1119); Gao Mingshun (高明順) (1119–1129); Gao Shunzhen (高順貞) (1129–1141); Gao Liangcheng (高量成) (1141–1147)
- Born: 1083
- Died: 1176 (aged 92–93)
Full name
- Family name: Duan (段); Given name: Yu (譽) or Heyu (和譽); later changed to Zhengyan (正嚴) Dharma name: Guanghong (廣弘)
Era dates
- Rixin (日新): 1108–1109; Wenzhi (文治): 1110–1121; Jiayong (嘉永): 1122–1128; Baotian (保天): 1129–1137; Guangyun (廣運): 1138–1147
Posthumous name
- Emperor Xuanren (宣仁皇帝)
Temple name
- Xianzong (憲宗)
- Dynasty: Dali

Duan Heyu
- Traditional Chinese: 段譽
- Simplified Chinese: 段誉
Transcriptions
Standard Mandarin
- Hanyu Pinyin: Duàn Yù

Duan Yu (1083–1176), courtesy name Heyu, also known by his temple name as the Emperor Xianzong of Dali, was the 16th emperor of the Dali Kingdom, reigning between 1108 and 1147. Following a family tradition, Duan's father, Duan Zhengchun, abdicated and became a monk in 1108. Duan succeeded his father as the emperor of Dali and renamed himself Duan Zhengyan (段正嚴). He abdicated and became a monk in 1147 and was succeeded by his son Duan Zhengxing.

== In fiction ==
Duan Yu is fictionalized as one of the main characters in the wuxia novel Demi-Gods and Semi-Devils by Louis Cha.

- Portrayed in Demi-Gods and Semi-Devils by Kent Tong (1982)
- Portrayed in Demi-Gods and Semi-Devils by Eddie Kwan (1991)
- Portrayed in Demi-Gods and Semi-Devils by Benny Chan (1997)
- Portrayed in Demi-Gods and Semi-Devils by Jimmy Lin (2003)
- Portrayed in Demi-Gods and Semi-Devils by Kim Ki-bum (2013)
- Portrayed in Demi-Gods and Semi-Devils by Bai Shu (2021)

== Notes ==
Preceded by Duan Zhengchun	Emperor of Dali; 1108 AD–1147 AD	Succeeded by Duan Zhengxing
