= Demi-Gods and Semi-Devils =

1963–1966 wuxia novel by Jin Yong

- Volume 16 of an early edition of Demi-Gods and Semi-Devils
- Author: Jin Yong
- Original title: 天龍八部
- Language: Chinese
- Genre: Wuxia
- Publisher: Ming Pao, Nanyang Siang Pau
- Publication date: 3 September 1963
- Publication place: Hong Kong
- Media type: Print
- ISBN: 9786263613652
- Preceded by: The Sword of the Yue Maiden
- Followed by: The Legend of the Condor Heroes

Demi-Gods and Semi-Devils
- Traditional Chinese: 天龍八部
- Simplified Chinese: 天龙八部
- Literal meaning: The Deva, the Nāga, the Eight Sections
Transcriptions
Standard Mandarin
- Hanyu Pinyin: Tiān Lóng Bā Bù
Yue: Cantonese
- Jyutping: Tin^{1} Lung^{4} Baat^{3} Bou^{6}

Demi-Gods and Semi-Devils (天龍八部) is a wuxia novel by Jin Yong (Louis Cha). It was first serialised concurrently from 3 September 1963 to 27 May 1966 in the newspapers Ming Pao in Hong Kong and Nanyang Siang Pau in Singapore. It has been adapted into films and television series in Hong Kong, Taiwan and Mainland China numerous times since the 1970s. Set in 11th-century China, the story follows three protagonists—Qiao Feng, Duan Yu, and Xuzhu—and features a vast cast drawn from the Song, Liao, Dali, Western Xia, and Tibetan realms, as well as numerous sects and organizations within the wulin.

The novel's Chinese title is a reference to the eight races of demi-gods and semi-devils described in Buddhist cosmology. In Buddhism, these demi-gods and semi-devils are different from the human race but are still bound to Saṃsāra by their own desires. Jin Yong originally modelled each major character after one of the races but, as he continued writing, the complexity of the story made some impossible for such a simplistic mapping. An alternative English title is Eight Books of the Heavenly Dragon.

== Plot ==
The plot is made up of separate yet intertwining storylines revolving around three protagonists – Qiao Feng, Duan Yu and Xuzhu – who eventually become sworn brothers. The complex narrative starts from Duan Yu's perspective before switching to Qiao Feng's and back, and introduces Xuzhu only in the later chapters.

=== Duan Yu's story ===
Duan Yu is a young and naïve member of the Dali Kingdom's royal family. Despite his family's status as an established martial arts clan in the wulin, he refuses to follow in their footsteps due to his reverence for Buddhist teachings and disdain for bloodshed. When his family tries to force him to learn martial arts, he runs away from home. Ironically, for the sake of survival, he ends up mastering three powerful skills and becoming a formidable martial artist. In addition, he acquires immunity to poison after accidentally consuming a venomous toad.

During his adventures, he becomes romantically involved with three young maidens: Zhong Ling, Mu Wanqing, Wang Yuyan. However, at different points in the novel, he is led to believe that they are all his half-sisters due to Duan Zhengchun's constant affairs with other women in the past. Of these maidens, he is extremely obsessed with Wang Yuyan, who resembles a statue of a fairy-like lady he chanced upon before. He persistently tries to win her heart despite her devotion to her cousin, Murong Fu, a descendant of the former Yan Kingdom.

Near the end of the novel, Duan Yu discovers that he is not Duan Zhengchun’s biological son. In Jin Yong’s final revision, Duan Yu marries Zhong Ling and Mu Wanqing, while Wang Yuyan goes back to her cousin, who suffers a mental breakdown after failing to restore the Yan Kingdom.

=== Qiao Feng's story ===
Qiao Feng is the charismatic chief of the Beggar Clan, the largest clan in the wulin. Famous for his heroic deeds and exceptional prowess in martial arts, he falls from grace after he is wrongly accused of murdering his adoptive parents and some fellow wulin members to cover up the fact that he has Khitan ancestry. He becomes an outcast of the wulin in the Han Chinese-dominated Song Empire, which is at war with the Khitan-led Liao Empire. He is forced to sever ties with the wulin and engage them in a one-against-several battle, during which he single-handedly kills many opponents, including some old friends and acquaintances.

Qiao Feng leaves to verify the claims that he is a Khitan and investigate the murders. He is accompanied by Azhu, who loves him and stands by him when the wulin turns against him. After a long journey in disguise, he concludes that he is indeed a Khitan and changes his name to Xiao Feng to reflect his ancestry. In tracking down a mysterious "Leading Big Brother", whom he believes is responsible for the murders and his parents' deaths, he mistakenly identifies Duan Zhengchun, a Dali nobleman, and challenges him to a one-to-one fight. However, after discovering that she is Duan Zhengchun’s daughter, Azhu disguises herself as him and takes his place. Xiao Feng realizes too late that he has mortally wounded Azhu rather than Duan. Before dying, she reveals that Duan is her father and leaves her sister Azi with Xiao Feng to take care of.

Xiao Feng becomes even more remorseful when he discovers that he had wrongly identified Duan Zhengchun as the “Leading Big Brother”. He leaves with Azi, who falls in love with him, although he does not reciprocate her feelings and remains devoted to her late sister. They wander far into northeast China and live among the Jurchen tribes. By chance, Xiao Feng encounters the Liao emperor Yelü Hongji, becomes sworn brothers with him, and helps him suppress a coup. In return, Xiao Feng is given a princely title and estate. He returns to the Song Empire later to find Azi and attend a wulin gathering hosted by the Shaolin Sect, where he reaffirms his oath of brotherhood with Duan Yu and Xuzhu, and fights alongside them against their common enemies. At the gathering, the truths behind all the murders are revealed and the guilty parties receive their just deserts; Xiao Feng also proves his innocence and makes peace with the wulin.

Towards the end of the novel, Yelü Hongji plans to invade the Song Empire and wants Xiao Feng to support him, but the latter refuses and attempts to dissuade him from bloodshed. The Liao emperor then imprisons Xiao Feng and leads his army to war. In the meantime, Azi escapes and seeks help from Duan Yu, Xuzhu, and their allies. Impressed by Xiao Feng's righteousness, they manage to rally members of the wulin to join them in rescuing Xiao Feng. Even though the mission is successful, they are ultimately outnumbered and trapped by Liao forces at the Yanmen Pass. Xiao Feng takes Yelü Hongji hostage and forces him to promise that there will be no war between the Song and the Liao for as long as the emperor lives. He then commits suicide while Azi follows suit.

=== Xuzhu's story ===
Xuzhu is a kind-hearted and devout Buddhist monk from the Shaolin Sect. He follows his elders to a meeting, which marks the start of his adventures. By coincidence and sheer luck, he breaks a weiqi formation and thus inherits the neigong and position of Wuyazi, the leader of the Carefree Sect. Later, he encounters Wuyazi's elder codisciple Tianshan Tonglao, learns martial arts from her, and eventually succeeds her as the ruler of Lingjiu Palace, which commands allegiance from a loose assembly of martial artists.

Feeling overwhelmed by the sudden influx of responsibilities, Xuzhu desires to detach himself from these duties and return to his former monastic life. However, he is unable to wrench himself free from the various tribulations that lie ahead. No longer regarded as a Shaolin monk, he is forced to accept his fate, using his newly-acquired skills and status in the wulin to perform good deeds. He is also revealed to be the illegitimate son of the Shaolin abbot Xuanci and the villainous Ye Erniang; his parents commit suicide shortly after the family's reunion. He becomes the prince consort of Western Xia after he marries Princess Yinchuan, to whom he is deeply in love.

== Adaptations ==
=== Films ===
| Year | Title | Production | Main cast |
|---|---|---|---|
| 1977 | The Battle Wizard | Shaw Brothers Studio (Hong Kong) | Danny Lee, Tien Lie, Lam Jan-kei, Wai Wang |
| 1984 | Demi-Gods and Semi-Devils (film) | Hong Kong | Norman Chui, Kent Tong, Felix Wong, Idy Chan, Lam Jan-kei, Austin Wai |
| 1994 | The Dragon Chronicles – The Maidens | Hong Kong | Brigitte Lin, Gong Li, Sharla Cheung, Frankie Lam |
| 2023 | Sakra | Hong Kong/Mainland China | Donnie Yen, Chen Yuqi, Cya Liu |

=== Television ===
| Year | Title | Production | Main cast |
|---|---|---|---|
| 1982 | Demi-Gods and Semi-Devils (1982 TV series) | TVB (Hong Kong) | Bryan Leung, Kent Tong, Felix Wong, Idy Chan, Wong Hang-sau, Chan Fuk-sang, Sharon Yeung |
| 1997 | Demi-Gods and Semi-Devils (1997 TV series) | TVB (Hong Kong) | Felix Wong, Benny Chan, Louis Fan, Carman Lee, Jay Lau, Rain Lau, Bondy Chiu, He Meitian, Cheung Kwok Keung, Evergreen Mak, Natilie Wong |
| 2003 | Demi-Gods and Semi-Devils (2003 TV series) | Ciwen Film & TV Production Co. Ltd. (Mainland China) | Hu Jun, Jimmy Lin, Gao Hu, Liu Yifei, Liu Tao, Chen Hao |
| 2013 | The Demi-Gods and Semi-Devils (2013 TV series) | Zhejiang Huace Film & TV Production Co. Ltd. (Mainland China) | Wallace Chung, Kim Ki-bum, Han Dong, Zhang Meng, Jia Qing, Zong Fengyan, Mao Xiaodan, Zhao Yuanyuan, Canti Lau |
| 2021 | The Demi Gods and Semi Devils | Tencent Video | Tony Yang, Bai Shu, Zhang Tianyang, Janice Man |

=== Video games ===
- Demi-Gods and Semi-Devils is a single player RPG released in 2002. The player takes on the role of an unrelated protagonist (default name Lei Zhen) and meets characters from the novel. His choices and actions will affect how the story progresses.
- Dragon Oath, also known as TLBB in China, is a MMORPG developed by Changyou and Sohu, and was launched in 2007.
- Tian Long Ba Bu: Shen Bing Hai Yu (天龙八部:神兵海域) is a MMORPG developed by Changyou and Sohu, and was launched in China on 25 October 2012. The game is endorsed by Hu Ge and Cecilia Liu, who appeared as Duan Yu and Wang Yuyan respectively in a short video promoting the game and other promotional material.
