= Duan Zhengchun =

Emperor Zhongzong of Dali 大理中宗

Emperor of Dali
- Reign: 1096–1108
- Predecessor: Gao Shengtai (of Dazhong)
- Successor: Duan Heyu
- Regent: Gao Taiming (高泰明)
Full name
- Family name: Duan (段); Given name: Zhengchun (正淳) Dharma name: Xiukong (修空)
Era dates
- Tianshou (天授): 1096; Mingkai (明開): 1097–1103; Tianzheng (天政): 1103–1104; Wen'an (文安): 1104–1108
Posthumous name
- Emperor Wen'an (文安皇帝)
Temple name
- Zhongzong (中宗)
- Dynasty: Dali

Duan Zhengchun
- Chinese: 段正淳
Transcriptions
Standard Mandarin
- Hanyu Pinyin: Duàn Zhèngchún

Duan Zhengchun, also known by his temple name as the Emperor Zhongzong of Dali, was the 15th emperor of the Dali Kingdom. He reigned from 1096 to 1108. He was the younger brother of Duan Zhengming, and the first ruler of the Later Dali Kingdom.

In 1094, Duan Zhengming was forced by Gao Shengtai to abdicate and become a monk. Gao then crowned himself emperor. However, after two years of reign, Gao Shengtai died in 1096 and made a will to return the throne to the Duan family. Duan Zhengchun ascended to the throne in 1096.

Duan Zhengchun abdicated and became a monk in 1108. He was succeeded by his son Duan Yu.

== In fiction ==
Duan Zhengchun is fictionalised as one of the key supporting characters in the wuxia novel Demi-Gods and Semi-Devils by Louis Cha.

== Notes ==
Preceded by Gao Shengtai of Dazhong	Emperor of Dali; 1096 AD–1108 AD	Succeeded by Duan Heyu of Dali
