= List of TVB series (1983) =

This is a list of series released by or aired on TVB Jade Channel in 1983.

== First line series ==
These dramas aired in Hong Kong from 7:00pm to 8:00pm, Monday to Friday on TVB.

Airing date	English title (Chinese title)	Number of episodes	Main cast	Theme song (T) Sub-theme song (ST)	Genre	Notes	Official website
3 Jan- 11 Feb	The Radio Tycoon 播音人	30	Angie Chiu, Chow Yun Fat, Michael Miu, Stanley Fung, Kenneth Tsang, Waise Lee	T: "愛定你一個" (Jenny Tseng)	Period drama		
14 Feb- 11 Mar	My Way 奔向太陽	20	Andy Lau, Bonnie Fu, Elanie Chow	T: "歡呼聲" (Ken Choi)	Modern drama		
21 Feb	The Fortune Teller 賴布衣	5	Michael Miu, Mariann Wong		Costume drama	Released overseas on February 26, 1982. Copyright notice: 1982.	
21 Mar- 15 Apr	The Superpower 天降財神	20	Chow Yun-fat, Tony Leung, Patricia Chong, Barbara Chan	T: "天降財神"; Alan Tam	Modern drama		Official website
18 Apr- 13 May	The Lives on Duck Lane 鴨仔里春光	20	Dominic Lam, Lee Heung Kam, Liu Wai Hung, Veronica Mudd	T: "愛情靠拼勁" (Elisa Chan)	Modern drama		
16 May- 10 Jun	Beyond the Rose Garden 再見十九歲	20	Patrick Tse, Louise Lee, Tony Leung, Regina Tsang, Veronica Mudd	T: "就算早知道" (Agnes Chan)	Modern drama		Official website
13 Jun- 8 Jul	Woman on the Beat 警花出更	20	Carol Cheng, Susanna Au Yeung, Bill Chan, Stanley Fung	T: "交出我的心" (Anita Mui)	Modern drama		Official website
11 Jul- 5 Aug	Encounter With Fortune 鬼咁夠運	20	Kent Cheng, Deanie Ip, Tony Leung, Elanie Chow	T: "幸運是我" (Deanie Ip)	Modern drama		
8 Aug- 2 Sep	It Takes Three 三相逢	20	Ray Lui, Angie Chiu, Stephen Tung	T: "可曾幸福過" (Frances Yip)	Modern drama		
5 Sep- 16 Sep	Good Morning Mother In-law 奶奶早晨	10	Angie Chiu, Wong Wan Choi, Lee Heung Kam		Modern drama		Official website
19 Sep- 14 Oct	The Private Eye 霹靂神探	20	Stanley Fung, Lau Kong, Susanna Kwan	T: "霹靂神探" (Johnny Yip)	Modern drama		
17 Oct- 11 Nov	Ghost on the Loose 冤鬼再見	20	Lau Dan, Dick Lau	T: "冤鬼再見" (Bennette Pang)	Modern drama		
14 Nov- 9 Dec	The Man in the Middle 夾心人	20	Adam Cheng, Barbara Yung, Liu Wai Hung	T: "夾心人" (Adam Cheng)	Modern drama		Official website
12 Dec- 30 Dec	The Adventure of the Woman Reporter 無冕天使	15	Louise Lee, Bill Chan, Lau Kong, Elaine Chow	T: "無冕天使" (Elisa Chan)	Modern drama		Official website

== Second line series ==
These dramas aired in Hong Kong from 8:00pm to 8:30pm, Monday to Friday on TVB.

Airing date	English title (Chinese title)	Number of episodes	Main cast	Theme song (T) Sub-theme song (ST)	Genre	Notes	Official website
8 Jun 1981- 11 Jul 1986	Hong Kong 1983 香港八三	1400	Lee Sing Cheung, Lee Kar Ding		Modern sitcom		

== Third line series ==
These dramas aired in Hong Kong from 8:30pm to 9:30pm, Monday to Friday on TVB.

Airing date	English title (Chinese title)	Number of episodes	Main cast	Theme song (T) Sub-theme song (ST)	Genre	Notes	Official website
24 Jan- 18 Feb	The Legend of the Unknowns 十三妹	20	Barbara Yung, Simon Yam, Kent Tong, Cecilia Wong	T: "巾幗英雄" (Frances Yip)	Costume drama		
21 Feb- 25 Mar	The Legend of the Condor Heroes 射鵰英雄傳之鐵血丹心	19	Felix Wong, Barbara Yung, Michael Miu, Louise Lee, Patrick Tse	T: "鐵血丹心" (Roman Tam & Jenny Tseng)	Costume drama	Prequel to 1983's The Legend of the Condor Heroes II.	Official website
28 Mar- 1 Apr	Man Who Came Back 再生緣	5	Louise Lee, Stanley Fung		Costume drama		
4 Apr- 29 Apr	The Bold Ones 豹子膽	20	Kent Tong, Austin Wai, Stephen Tung, Wong Man Ying	T: "豹子膽" (Lee Lung Kei)	Period drama		Official website
2 May- 27 May	The Legend of the Condor Heroes II 射鵰英雄傳之東邪西毒	20	Felix Wong, Barbara Yung, Lau Dan	T: "一生有意義" (Roman Tam & Jenny Tseng)	Costume drama	Sequel to 1983's The Legend of the Condor Heroes. Prequel to 1983's The Legend of the Condor Heroes III.	
30 May- 24 Jun	The Old Miao Myth 老洞	20	Andy Lau, Ray Lui, Patricia Chong	T: "迷路" (Leslie Cheung)	Period drama		
27 Jun- 22 Jul	The Legend of the Condor Heroes III 射鵰英雄傳之華山論劍	20	Felix Wong, Barbara Yung, Michael Miu	T: "世間始終你好" (Roman Tam & Jenny Tseng)	Costume drama	Prequel to 1983's The Legend of the Condor Heroes II.	
25 Jul- 5 Aug	Foon Lok Cheung On 歡樂長安	10	Ha Yu, Rebecca Chan		Costume drama		
8 Aug- 2 Sep	Angels and Devils 北斗雙雄	20	Chow Yun-fat, Tony Leung, Simon Yam, Rebecca Chan	T: "我走我路" (Leslie Cheung)	Modern drama		Official website
5 Sep- 30 Sep	The Fortune Teller II 賴布衣妙算玄機	20	Michael Miu, Liu Wai Hung, Patricia Chong, Mariann Wong	T: "碧海青天" (Michael Kwan)	Costume drama	Sequel to 1983's The Fortune Teller.	
3 Oct- 28 Oct	Two More Heroes 勇者福星	20	Ray Lui, Austin Wai, Rebecca Chan, Ha Yu	T: "一切待揭盅" (Lee Lung Kei)	Costume drama		
31 Oct- 6 Jan 1984	The Return of the Condor Heroes 神鵰俠侶	50	Andy Lau, Idy Chan, Susanna Au Yeung, Bryan Leung	T: "何日再相見" (Teresa Cheung)	Costume drama	Copyright notice: 1983 (Eps. 1-44), 1984 (Eps. 45-50).	Official website
