= List of TVB series (1984) =

This is a list of series released by or aired on TVB Jade Channel in 1984.

== First line series ==
These dramas aired in Hong Kong from 7:00pm to 8:00pm, Monday to Friday on TVB.

Airing date	English title (Chinese title)	Number of episodes	Main cast	Theme song (T) Sub-theme song (ST)	Genre	Notes	Official website
2 Jan- 27 Jan	The Clones 再版人	20	Tony Leung, Carina Lau, Stanley Fung, Susanna Au Yeung, Simon Yam	T: "為何" (Lee Loon Ki)	Modern drama		Official website
30 Jan- 10 Feb	The Return of Mischievous Lots 扭計雙星	10	Albert Au, Johnny Yip, Yammie Nam	T: "扭計雙星" (Roman Tam)	Modern drama		
13 Feb- 17 Feb	Can Anybody Help 愛情一千米	5	Felix Wong, Teresa Mo		Modern drama		
20 Feb- 16 Mar	Father Knows Best 老爺大過天	20	Wong Wan Choi, Cecilia Wong, Susanna Au Yeung	T: "他在關心你" (Susana Kwan)	Modern drama		
19 Mar- 23 Mar	Memory of Hometown 故鄉情	5	Bill Chan, Cecilia Wong, Maggie Li		Modern drama		
26 Mar- 20 Apr	The Young Detective 摩登幹探	20	Bill Chan, Felix Wong, Kiki Sheung, Teresa Mo	T: "心裏情" (Fung Wai Lam)	Modern drama		Official website
23 Apr- 18 May	Rainbow Round My Shoulder 畫出彩虹	20	Maggie Cheung, Jim Ping Hei, Ray Lui, Susanna Au Yeung	T: "畫出彩虹" (Danny Chan)	Modern drama		
21 May- 15 Jun	It Takes All Kinds 超越愛情線	20	Felix Wong, Carol Cheng, Simon Yam, Yammie Nam, Rebecca Chan	T: "變幻是緣份" (Kenny Bee)	Modern drama		
18 Jun- 29 Jun	Once Upon an Ordinary Girl 儂本多情	10	Leslie Cheung, Kiki Sheung, Susanna Kwan	T: "儂本多情" (Leslie Cheung)	Period drama		
2 Jul- 13 Jul	The Least Likely to Succeed 為人師表	10	Simon Yam, Patricia Chong	T: "青春的烙印" (Agnes Chiang)	Modern drama		
23 Jul- 17 Aug	The Rise and Fall of a Stand-in 五虎將	20	Michael Miu, Kent Tong	T: "飛躍舞台" (Anita Mui)	Modern drama		Official website
27 Aug- 14 Sep	A Woman to Remember 秋瑾	20	Liza Wang, Patrick Tse, Simon Yam	T: "秋風秋雨" (Liza Wang)	Costume drama		Official website
17 Sep- 12 Oct	It's A Long Way Home 家有嬌妻	20	Tony Leung, Yammie Nam, Carol Cheng, Ray Lui	T: "愛的短箭" (Teresa Cheung Tak Lan)	Modern drama		
15 Oct- 26 Oct	The Prima Donas of Hong Kong 朝九晚五俏佳人	10	Louise Lee, Wong Wan Choi	T: "吃不消" (Annabelle Lui 雷安娜)	Modern drama		
29 Oct- 21 Dec	Police Cadet '84 新紮師兄	40	Tony Leung, Maggie Cheung, Carina Lau, Sean Lau, David Lui, Mariann Wong, Tai Chi Wai, Eddie Kwan	T: "伴我啟航" (Little Tigers)	Modern drama	Prequel to 1985's Police Cadet '85.	Official website
24 Dec- 18 Jan 1985	Summer Kisses Winter Tears 香江花月夜	20	Anita Mui, Michael Miu, Kent Tong, Flora King	T: "歌衫淚影" (Anita Mui)	Period drama		

== Second line series ==
These dramas aired in Hong Kong from 8:00pm to 8:30pm, Monday to Friday on TVB.

Airing date	English title (Chinese title)	Number of episodes	Main cast	Theme song (T) Sub-theme song (ST)	Genre	Notes	Official website
8 Jun 1981- 11 Jul 1986	Hong Kong 1984 香港八四	1400	Lee Sing Cheung, Lee Kar Ding		Modern sitcom		

== Third line series ==
These dramas aired in Hong Kong from 8:30pm to 9:30pm, Monday to Friday on TVB.

Airing date	English title (Chinese title)	Number of episodes	Main cast	Theme song (T) Sub-theme song (ST)	Genre	Notes	Official website
9 Jan- 3 Feb	Gary's Angel 黃金約會	18	Angie Chiu, Ray Lui, Patricia Chong	T: "黃金約會" (Kitman Mak)	Modern drama		
6 Feb- 2 Mar	The Foundation 決戰玄武門	20	Felix Wong, Barbara Yung, Michael Miu, Kent Tong, Flora King	T: "夢裏幾番哀" (Michelle Pao)	Costume drama		
5 Mar- 30 Mar	The Fearless Duo 天師執位	20	Barbara Yung, Michael Miu, Lau Dan, Mariann Wong	T: "誰可改變" (Alan Tam)	Costume drama		Official website
2 Apr- 11 May	The Smiling Proud Wanderer 笑傲江湖	30	Chow Yun-fat, Rebecca Chan, Jamie Chik, Stephen Tung, Kenneth Tsang	T: "笑傲江湖" (Johnny Yip & Frances Yip)	Costume drama		
14 May- 8 Jun	United We Stand 生鏽橋王	20	Michael Miu, Barbara Yung, Michael Tao	T: "世間情" (Michael Au)	Period drama		Official website
11 Jun- 6 Jul	Love Me, Love Me Not 信是有緣	20	Idy Chan, Kent Tong, Wong Wan Choi, Mariann Wong	T: "只要跟着你" (Jenny Tseng)	Modern drama		
9 Jul- 31 Aug	The Duke of Mount Deer 鹿鼎記	40	Tony Leung, Andy Lau, Carina Lau, Teresa Mo, Kiki Sheung, Elaine Chow, Flora King, Sandra Ng	T: "始終會行運" (Leslie Cheung)	Costume drama		
3 Sep- 28 Sep	The Other Side of the Horizon 魔域桃源	20	Andy Lau, Angie Chiu, Lawrence Ng, Wong Wan Choi, Elaine Chow	T: "魔域桃源" (Roman Tam)	Costume drama		Official website
1 Oct- 5 Oct	Hero Without Tears II 青鋒劍影	5	Michael Miu, Patricia Chong, Carina Lau	T: "劍影淚痕" (Kitman Mak)	Costume drama		
8 Oct- 12 Oct	Beware of Your Bosom Buddies 碧血洗銀槍	5	Michael Tao		Costume drama		
15 Oct- 9 Nov	The Return of Wong Fei Hung 寶芝林	20	Andy Lau, Yammie Nam, Kent Tong, Stephen Tung	T: "勇者無懼" (Cheung Ming Man)	Costume drama		
12 Nov- 4 Jan 1985	The New Adventures of Chor Lau-heung 楚留香之蝙蝠傳奇	40	Michael Miu, Barbara Yung, Simon Yam, Austin Wai, Elanie Chow, Sharon Yeung, Mimi Kung	T: "笑踏河山" (Roman Tam)	Costume drama		
