= List of TVB series (1982) =

This is a list of series released by or aired on TVB Jade Channel in 1982.

Airing date	English title (Chinese title)	Number of episodes	Main cast	Theme song (T) Sub-theme song (ST)	Genre	Notes	Official website
11 Jan	Ladies of the House 神女有心	15	Michael Miu, Louise Lee, Fung Bo Bo, Peter Yang, Elanie Chow		Costume drama		Official website
11 Jan	Chinese Folklore 新民間傳奇	10	Angie Chiu, Simon Yam, Bill Chan		Modern drama		
25 Jan	The Understudy 戲班小子	20	Stephen Tung, Michael Miu, Rebecca Chan, Sharon Yeung				
1 Feb	The Mavericks 孤城客	20	Chow Yun-fat, Susanna Au Yeung, Patricia Chong		Costume drama		
22 Feb	The Brave Young Ones 男子漢	20	Ray Lui, Stanley Fung, Dorothy Yu		Modern drama		Official website
1 Mar	The Check Mate 將軍抽車	15	Melvin Wong, Gigi Wong, Dominic Lam, Simon Yam				
22 Mar	Demi-Gods and Semi-Devils 天龍八部	50	Kent Tong, Idy Chan, Bryan Leung, Felix Wong, Cecilia Wong, Patrick Tse, Bill Chan	T: "兩忘煙水裏" (Susanna Kwan & Michael Kwan)	Costume drama		
22 Mar	You Only Live Twice 飛越十八層	20	Michael Miu, Jamie Chik, Stanley Fung	T: "難為正邪定分界" (Johnny Yip)	Modern drama		Official website
19 Apr	In Love and War 福星高照	20	Angie Chiu, Susanna Au Yeung, Lau Kong, Elanie Chow				
3 May	Star Palace 星塵	25	Louise Lee, Carol Cheng, Deanie Ip, Regina Tsang				
17 May	Fool's Paradise 假日風情	10	Dominic Lam, Rebecca Chan, Deanie Ip		Modern drama		
31 May	雙面人	10	Adam Cheng, Angie Chiu				
7 Jun	Destiny 荊途	60	Carol Cheng, Ray Lui, Simon Yam				
7 Jun	The Roller Coaster 過山車	20	Felix Wong, Jamie Chik, Tai Chi Wai, Stanley Fung				
4 Jul	活力十一	13	Stephen Chow, Tony Leung, Francis Ng				
3 Aug	The Restless Trio 花艇小英雄	10	Andy Lau, Stephen Tung, Patricia Chong		Costume drama		
30 Aug	The Wild Bunch 十三太保	20	Felix Wong, Idy Chan, Kent Tong, Austin Wai, Stephen Tung		Costume drama		
13 Sep	Lady Sings The Blue 郎歸晚	10	Liza Wang, Susanna Au Yeung	T: "郎歸晚" (Liza Wang)			
27 Sep	The Legend of Master So 蘇乞兒	20	Chow Yun-fat, Andy Lau, Michael Miu, Michelle Yim, Rebecca Chan	T: "忘盡心中情" (Johnny Yip)	Period Piece		
27 Sep	Soldier of Fortune 香城浪子	30	Felix Wong, Kent Tong, Patricia Chong, Tony Leung	T: "心債" (Anita Mui)			
25 Oct	Sweet Love Encore 愛情安哥 Encore	20	Ken Choi, Albert Au, Mariann Wong, Simon Kwan	T: "那天再重聚" (Albert Au)			
15 Nov	A Baby Makes Three 錯結良緣	9	Carol Cheng		Modern drama		
22 Nov	Love and Passion 萬水千山總是情	30	Liza Wang, Patrick Tse, Ray Lui, Regina Tsang	T: "萬水千山總是情" (Liza Wang)	Costume drama		
29 Nov	Love with Many Phases 癡情劫	20	Rebecca Chan, Bill Chan				
27 Dec	The Emissary 獵鷹	20	Andy Lau, Deanie Ip, Barbara Chan		Modern drama	Copyright notice: 1982 (Eps. 1-5), 1983 (Eps. 6-20).	Official website
