= The Old Miao Myth =

Hong Kong television series

- VCD cover
- 老洞
- Genre: Period drama Suspense
- Written by: Leung Kin-wah; Wai Ka-fai; Yau Mui-yuen; Choi Kwok-leung; Sit Ka-wah; Gary Tang; Tang wai-ling Lam Ling
- Directed by: Chiu Man-keung; Lee Yiu-ming; Lee Kwok-lap; Siu Kin-hang
- Starring: Andy Lau; Ray Lui; Patricia Chong; Stephen Tung; Lau Siu-ming
- Theme music composer: Michael Lai
- Opening theme: Lost (迷路) by Leslie Cheung
- Country of origin: Hong Kong
- Original language: Cantonese
- No. of episodes: 20

Production
- Producer: Chiu Man-keung
- Production location: Hong Kong
- Camera setup: Multi camera
- Production company: TVB

Original release
- Network: TVB Jade
- Release: 30 May – 24 June 1983

The Old Miao Myth
- Traditional Chinese: 老洞
- Simplified Chinese: 老洞
- Literal meaning: "The Old Cave"
Transcriptions
Standard Mandarin
- Hanyu Pinyin: Lǎo Dòng
Yue: Cantonese
- Jyutping: Lou2 Dung6

The Old Miao Myth is a 1983 Hong Kong period suspense television series produced by TVB and starring Andy Lau, Ray Lui and Patricia Chong. The series centers around a statue and slowly evolves into a broad story with many bizarre twists and turns, which stirred up a sensation when it was first broadcast.

== Plot ==
Thirty years ago, a man of Miao descent asked Tse Kong (Lau Siu-ming) to keep a statue called the "Old Cave" on his behalf, telling him that the statue can allow him to become wealthy. Tse Kong soon makes a fortune, and became a tycoon in Shanghai, dominating both the police and underworld. However, Tse becomes intoxicated with Gu poison. Tse's friend Hao Cheung-ching (Ho Pik-kin) unscrupulously informs the secret of the "Old Cave" to the Japanese. Tse's second son Seung-wai (Stephen Tung), who is slightly neurotic, falls in love with female spy Yip Ching-wah (Fu Yuk-lan). Although Seung-wai knows that Ching-wah is getting close to him to steal the "Old Cave", he does not debunk her. Tse's third son Seung-cho (Andy Lau) is confidant and stable. Although he is greatly trusted by his father, Seung-wai has no interest in taking over the family business. Seung-cho and Chin Pong (Ray Lui) are close friends, but they both fall in love with Cho's classmate Yan So-sam (Patrica Chong). Difficult to choose between friendship and love, the three of them fall into a tangled love triangle. At this time, Ching-wah mysteriously dies, while Wai disappears with the "Old Cave". The influence of the Tse family have since declined, with strange things occurring and disasters coming one after another. Whether all this is manipulated by a culprit or caused by an unknown divine force, it is all unknown.

== Cast ==
=== The Tse family ===
- Lau Siu-ming as Tse Kong (謝罡), a triad leader in the Shanghai French Concession territory and guardian of the "Old Cave". When he discovers female spy Yip Ching-wah stealing the "Old Cave", they embroil in a physical fight where he is stabbed by a shark object on a table. After being hospitalized afterwards, his oxygen was rigged by a nurse, where he dies in episode 6.
- Lai Siu-fong as Madam Tse (謝老太)
- Kwan Chung as Tse Seung-king (謝尚荊), Kong's eldest son who covets Ching-wah's beauty and takes her as his mistress. However, after going through a series of accidents, he leaves Shanghai in episode 9.
- Hui Yat-wah as Seung-king's wife who leaves Shanghai with him in episode 9.
- Stephen Tung as Tse Seung-wai (謝尚瑋), Kong's second son who is slightly neurotic and enjoys doing activities during nighttime and dislikes the "Old Cave". He falls in love with Ching-wah and becomes engaged to her, whom manipulates him into helping her steal the "Old Cave".
- Andy Lau as Tse Seung-cho (謝尚楚), the main protagonist of the series, Kong's third son who is a college student. Seung-wai is Kong's most beloved and trusted son, although Wai refuses to inherit the family business. After Wai graduated, he operated a department store and eventually takes over the family's underworld businesses. He is also Yan So-sam's old classmate, whom he wholeheartedly pursues after reuniting with her, although they became a bickering couple. After Kong died, Wai became the guardian of the "Old Cave".
- Fok Kit-ching as Tse Ying-ying (謝盈盈), Kong's youngest and only daughter who falls in love with Chin Pong at first sight.

=== The Yan family ===
- Kwan Kin as Yan Ham-keung (甄湛強), head of the Yan household whose real identity is Japanese Army officer Yoshida Hideo (吉田秀男). He is So-sam's adopted father and Ching-wah's maternal uncle and once loaned from a bank operated by the Tse family.
- Sheung-kwun Yuk as Lady Yan (甄太太), Ham-keung's wife and So-sam's adopted mother.
- Patricia Chong as Yan So-sam (甄素心), an orphan who was adopted by Ham-keung at age 3 and was oblivious about the fact she was an adopted child until her adopted mother reveals it to her after Keung died. She is Seung-cho's old classmate turned girlfriend, although as a bickering couple. While dating Keung, she also develops feelings for Chin Pong, gradually forming as love triangle.
- Fu Yuk-lan as Yip Ching-wah (葉清華), a Japanese spy who is Ham-keung's niece and So-sam's older cousin who have lived with them for four years. Born to a father who was also a spy, she was originally named Tokugawa Misako (德川操子) and started spy training as at the age of 8 before officially becoming as spy at age 11, and is nicknamed the "Multi Faced Girl" (千面女郎). She was once Seung-king's French teacher and used her beauty to seduce him and becomes his mistress in order to steal the "Old Cave". At that same time, she also becomes engaged to Seung-wai and manipulates him to help her steal the "Old cave". After failing her mission, she was shot to death with an arrow by a mysterious person in episode 9.

=== The Ha family ===
- Ho Pik-kin as Ha Cheung-ching (夏長清), Kong's friend for forty years and director a hospital operated by the Tse family. In episode 3, Cheung-ching betrays Kong and informs the Japanese about the "Old Cave". When Kong discovers this, Ching commits suicide to kill himself as a way to apologize to Kong.
- Ray Lui as Chin Pong (展邦), Cheung-ching's godson and son of the leader of the Miao tribe. He was sent by his father to Shanghai to study in medical school and find the "Old Cave". He was initially a doctor, before mixing in to the Tse family to look for the "Old Cave", where a he managed a movie theater before working in a casino.
  - David Cheng as young Chin Pong

=== Japanese Spy Organization ===
- Kwan Kin as Yoshida Hideo (吉田秀男), see The Yan family.
- Lam Tin as Ho tak-tai (何德泰), originally named Ito Yuzo (伊藤雄三), the lieutenant general of the Japanese Army who is primary responsibility for developing chemical and biological weapons. He assumes the identity of a triad leader to conceal his true identity as a spy. After failing his mission, he commits seppuku.
- Fu Yuk-lan as Tokugawa Misako (德川操子), see The Yan Family.
- Felix Lok as a Doctor of Philosophy who assist the Japanese in experimentation and research of the human body
- Chan Ka-yin as a nurse working for the Japanese who was responsible for rigging Kong's oxygen hose and killing him.
- Wong Ching-yee as a nurse working for the Japanese who was responsible for injecting a poison syringe into Seung-wai's body. When she failed to do so, she was shot dead by the organization.

=== Other cast ===
- Ma Hing-sang
- Chun Hung as Hing (阿興), a fighter for the Tse family gang.
- Ng wah-san
- Stephen Chow as Hong (阿康), a servant of the Tse family.
- Lee Kin-chuen
- Lok Kung
- Mui Lan as Lan (阿蘭), the housekeeper for the Tse family.
- Luk Man-chun
- Lau Mei-man
- Wong So-mei
- Lo Heung-ning
- Pak Lan
- Diego Swing
- Bobby Au-yeung
- Raymond Wong
- Leung Siu-chau as Wo (阿和) a fighter for the Tse family gang.
- Amy Wu as Wo's wife.
- Carrie Ng
- Lau Wai-hoi
- Lee Kwok-ping
- Bobby Tsang as a ghost hunter of the Miao tribe who specializes in casting Gu poison. He would usually threaten to cast Gu poison to the Miao tribe in order to loot their food
- Lo Kwok-hung
- Lee Yeung-to
- Tse Chi-yeung
- Ng Pok-kwan
- Ma Chung-tak
- Wong Sze-yan
- Chan Wing-fai
- Wong Chung-chi
- Tang Yu-chiu as a human guinea pig.
  - also portrays Doctor Chan (陳醫生) in a later episode.
- Shek Siu-lun
- Cheung Chi-keung
- Chu Tit-wo as Brother Sam (森哥), a veteran servant of the Tse family.
- Chan Chi-keung
- Andy Tai as Chiu Sung-chi (趙祟志), So-sam's old classmate who was a class president and now the director of a charity play.
- Chi Pui-fan
- Lau Miu-ling
- Choi Kwok-lim
- Lai Pik-kwong
- Ho Kwong-lun
- Mak Chi-wan
- Fung Kwok
- Michelle Szema as a nurse.
- Lee Shu-fan
- Bolo Fremes Kei
- Eddy Ko
- Hung Tung-leung
- Lau Kwok-sing
- Law Chan-piu
- Cheng Fan-sang
- Lai Sau-fong
- Francis Ng as Mister Ng (吳先生), secretary of the French consul
  - also portrays a student rehearsing for the charity play.
- Waise Lee as a student rehearsing for the charity play.

== See also ==
- Andy Lau filmography
- List of TVB series (1983)
