= The Restless Trio =

Hong Kong television series

- Official poster
- 花艇小英雄
- Genre: Action; Comedy
- Screenplay by: Vera Chan; Tse Yan; Tang Wing-hong
- Story by: Ng Sek-hing
- Directed by: Lau Sze-yu; Ng Yat-fan; Wong Kin-fan; Lee Yiu-ming
- Starring: Andy Lau; Stephen Tung; Patricia Chong; Kwok Fung; Lau Siu-ming; Lee Heung-kam
- Theme music composer: Michael Lai
- Opening theme: The Restless Trio (花艇小英雄) by Lee Lung-kei
- Country of origin: Hong Kong
- Original language: Cantonese
- No. of episodes: 19

Production
- Producer: Yau Ka-hung
- Production location: Hong Kong
- Camera setup: Multi camera
- Production company: TVB

Original release
- Network: TVB Jade
- Release: 3 August – 26 August 1982

The Restless Trio
- Title screen shot
- Traditional Chinese: 花艇小英雄
- Simplified Chinese: 花艇小英雄
- Literal meaning: "The Young Hero of the Flower Boat"
Transcriptions
Standard Mandarin
- Hanyu Pinyin: Huā Tǐng Xiǎo Yīng Xióng

The Restless Trio is a 1982 Hong Kong action comedy television series produced by TVB and starring Andy Lau, Stephen Tung and Patricia Chong.

== Plot ==
In Pak Tau town near the provincial capital during the era of the Republic of China, rich heir Chin Yat-tim (Andy Lau) falls in love with Cho-cho (Patricia Chong), a prostitute working on a flower boat. Yat-tim deliberately gets close to Cho-cho to please her. However, Cho-cho's heart belonged to her childhood friend, Wong Siu-po (Stephen Tung), a poor worker of the flower boat. Although Siu-po has feelings for Cho-cho, she did not dare to confess to her due to his poverty and low social status. Later, under a strange combination of circumstances, Cho-cho was forced to marry rich tycoon Lui Chin-pang (Lau Dan).

In actuality, Lui is a pirate. One day, after successfully robbing treasures, he was discovered by Ko Yung (Lau Siu-ming), who wanted a share of the treasures. As a result, the two launched an attack against one another, causing havoc on the flower boat.

After Lui's identity was exposed and was arrested, Cho-cho regains her freedom and reunites with Siu-po. At this time, Yat-tim gets Siu-po and Cho-cho's help during a family crisis. Being grateful to the two, Yat-tim reconciles with Siu-po and exits the love triangle between him, Cho-cho and Siu-po, and is determined to accomplish a major achievement.

== Cast ==
- Andy Lau as Chin Yat-tim (錢日添)
- Stephen Tung as Wong Siu-po (汪小寶)
- Patricia Chong as Cho-cho (楚楚)
- Kwok Fung as Mak Chiu (麥超)
- Lau Siu-ming as Ko Yung (高勇)
- Lee Heung-kam as Aunt Pui (佩姨)
- Lau Dan as Lui Chin-pang (雷展鵬)
- Chong Man-ching as Chan Kiu (陳嬌)
- Liu Wai-hung as Double-finger Chat (孖指七)
- David Lo as Director (導演)
- Albert Lo as Wong Wai (王威)
- Ma Hing-sang as Young Master Ngau (牛少爺)
- Wong Chu-chi as Beggar Chu (乞丐阿豬)
- Man Kit-wan as Chun-to (春桃)
- Bonnie Wong as Po-yuet (抱月)
- Ho Kwai-lam as Young Master Wong (王大少)
- Ho Kwong-lun as Fu (阿虎)
- Lau Wai-hoi
- Wong Sze-yan
- Lai Pik-kwong
- Leung Siu-chau as Lui Chin-pang's underling
- Mak Chi-wan as Lui Chin-pang's underling
- Ng Pok-kwan
- Chan Wing-fai
- Tse Ming-chong
- Yim Kin-wah
- Lee Kin-chuen as Chin Yat-tim's misfit friend
- Lo Tin-wai as Chin Yat-tim's misfit friend
- Cheng Hau-wah as Chin Yat-tim's misfit friend
- Wong Yuen-yung as Prostitute
- Choi Wai-mei as Prostitute
- Lau Yee-nei as Prostitute
- Au Yim-lin as Prostitute
- Wong So-mei as Prostitute
- Lau Hung-fong as Prostitute
- Lok Kung as Chin Kui-fu (錢鉅富)
- Cho Chai as Man Chat (萬七)
- Chan Yau-hau as Chan Tai-man (陳大文)
- Tsui Kwong-lam as Wood chopper
- Tse Chi-yeung
- Ng Wah-san
- Wu Po-wah as Theatre actor
- Lee Wai-mui as Theatre actor
- Peggy Lam as Theatre actor
- Law Ching-ho as Theatre actor
- Chan Pak-san as Theatre actor
- Yeung Sam-lun as Theatre actor
- Tang Yu-chiu as Theatre actor
- Chun Kwok-lim as Theatre actor
- Tsui Suk-fong as Theatre actor
- Keung Pui-lei as Theatre actor
- Ho Wai-yee
- Ling Hon as Uncle Chat (七叔)
- Lo Kwok-wai
- Tsang Cho-lam
- Yung Sau-yee
- Tang Sun-nin
- Shek Siu-lun
- Chin Sui-hing
- Stephen Chow as Tea house customer
- Ai Wai
- Tam Yat-ching
- Bobby Tsang
- Tam Chuen-hing
- Leung Kit-wah as Wong Wai's cousin
- Lee Yuk-man
- Hui Yat-wah
- Sit Choi-ha
- Lo Heung-ning
- Chan On-ying
- Wai Yee-yan as Chui-heung (翠香)
- Pak Lan
- Ho Wai-nam
- Wong Chak-fung as Tea house staff

== See also ==
- Andy Lau filmography
- List of TVB series (1982)
