= The New Adventures of Chor Lau-heung =

The New Adventures of Chor Lau-heung may refer to:

- The New Adventures of Chor Lau-heung (1984 TV series) (楚留香之蝙蝠傳奇), a 1984 Hong Kong TV series starring Michael Miu
- The New Adventures of Chor Lau-heung (2001 TV series) (新楚留香), a 2001 Hong Kong-Taiwanese TV series starring Richie Ren
