= The Young Heroes of Shaolin =

- Traditional Chinese: 英雄出少年
- Simplified Chinese: 英雄出少年
- Hanyu Pinyin: Yīngxióng chū shàonián
- Jyutping: jing1hung4 ceot1siu3nin4
- Genre: Wuxia
- Starring: Wei Tung; Auyeung Pui-San; Yan Pak; Fung Kwok
- Country of origin: Hong Kong
- Original language: Cantonese
- No. of seasons: 1
- No. of episodes: 20

Production
- Production location: Hong Kong
- Editors: Chiu Chi-kin; Leung Kin-cheung
- Running time: 42 minutes per episode
- Production company: TVB

Original release
- Network: TVB Jade
- Release: 19 October – 13 November 1981

The Young Heroes of Shaolin is a 1981 Hong Kong wuxia television series based on three key figures of the martial art of kung fu, set in 1912. The series has twenty episodes and is produced by Yau Ka-hung.

== Plot ==
During the last years of the oppressive Qing Dynasty, China is divided into factions led mostly by patriots, among them the Sky Union and the Hung School. Three young people - Hung Hay Koon, Fong Sai Yuk and Wu Wai Kin - united for a golden artifact pertaining to the Ming Dynasty, upon being persecuted by Manchurian peasants, find refuge in Shaolin and become respected kung-fu warriors.

== Cast ==
- Wei Tung as Fong Sai-yuk
- Michael Miu as Wu Wai-Kin
- Auyeung Pui-San as Yiu Lang-Tui
- Yan Pak as Miu Tui-Fa
- Fung Kwok as Chek Kun Sin

== Broadcast ==
The series aired on TVB Jade in twenty daily episodes on weeknights between October–November 1981.

On 17 May 1986, the series started airing on RTP1 in Portugal, airing on Saturday afternoons. The series ended its run there on 4 October. There, it had a noticeable impact, largely due to its action scenes. A listing on Diário de Lisboa on its premiere day says that the series was also sold to channels in Thailand, Australia and Japan, having high ratings alongside the original Hong Kong airing.

The series aired in Peru on Panamericana Televisión in the mid-1980s. Unusual for a Latin Spanish dub, it was done locally, when Grupo RPP was still part of Panamericana.
