= The Legend of the Unknowns =

- Starring: Cecilia Wong; Kent Tong; Sharon Yeung; Barbara Yung; Simon Yam
- Opening theme: "巾幗英雄" (Heroine) by Frances Yip
- Composer: Joseph Koo
- Country of origin: Hong Kong
- Original language: Cantonese
- No. of episodes: 20

Production
- Running time: 45 minutes (20 episodes)

Original release
- Network: TVB
- Release: 24 January – 18 February 1983

The Legend of the Unknowns (十三妹) is a TVB television series, premiered in 1983. Starring: Cecilia Wong, Kent Tong, Sharon Yeung, Barbara Yung, Simon Yam. Theme song "Heroine" (巾幗英雄) composition and arrangement by Joseph Koo, lyricist by Wong Jim, sung by Frances Yip.

== Casts ==
- Barbara Yung as Princess Sheung
