= Amazing Spring =

2019 Malaysian Cantonese-language comedy film

- Amazing Spring poster
- Directed by: Nick Wong
- Written by: Nick Wong
- Produced by: Nick Wong
- Starring: Cedric Loo; Sharon Yeung Pan Pan; Law Kar-ying; Jack Lim; Joey Leong
- Cinematography: Vincent Lau
- Edited by: Ngaw Yin Yin
- Production companies: Dreamax Entertainment; Multimedia Entertainment; The Film Engine
- Release date: 5 February 2019 (Malaysia)
- Running time: 110 minutes
- Country: Malaysia
- Language: Cantonese
- Box office: RM 3.01 million

Amazing Spring (Chinese: 大地回春) is a 2019 Malaysian Cantonese-language musical comedy film. The film tells the story of an arrogant young heir who tries to acquire the Dadi Village in the present, but accidentally travels back to a stranger and funnier version of Dadi Village in the past.

The film is released on 5 February 2019 in Malaysia.

== Synopsis ==
In order to take over the position of the group chairman with his mother's approval, Liang Minshan (Cedric Loo) decided to accept the challenge of acquiring the Dadi Village. When acquiring the village, he accidentally fell and collapsed, only to waking up in the mountains, having been traveled back to a strange Dadi Village in the old times. He must work to find a way back to the present.

== Production ==
The production team build the set for Dadi Village in Bandar Bukit Puchong, Selangor, spending more than 1 million ringgit. The film uses a lot of extras which includes seniors, kids and animals. The film budget is reportedly 4.5 million.

=== Fire accident ===
On September 17, 2018, a fire broke out at the village during the shooting of a fire scene. When the crew used gasoline to burn the wooden houses, one of the houses' went out of control and in 2 seconds, the accident was invoked. Firemen on duty quickly put out the fire. Actors including Sharon Yeung, Joey Leong and more than 20 extras who played the villagers were injured and admitted to the hospital. Yeung has sustained 7% of second-degree burns on the left side of her face but did not leave scars; Leong had 5% of second-degree burns on both her legs and has since recovered. In the following days, some of the actors remained at the hospital for treatment, while some was approved for discharge. Director Nick Wong and producer Jack Lim apologized and expressed respect to the cast members, and has applied for insurance and compensation.
