= Regina Hing Yue Tsang =

Chinese actress and singer from Hong Kong

- Chinese: 曾庆瑜
- Other names: Regina Tsang, Regina Tsang Ching-Yu, Hing Yue Chang, Chang Hing Yue
- Occupations: Actress; singer
- Known for: 1978 Miss Hong Kong 2nd runner up

Regina Hing Yue Tsang (Chinese: 曾庆瑜) is a Chinese actress, singer and beauty pageant titleholder. Tsang is the 1978 Miss Hong Kong 2nd runner up. Tsang is known for Sword Stained with Royal Blood, the 1985 Wuxia TV series that was broadcast on TVB.

== Career ==
In 1978, Tsang competed in Miss Hong Kong Pageant and won as 2nd runner up. Tsang was defeated by Winnie Chan. It is tradition for the 2nd place winner to proceed to participate at the Miss International pageant. On November 10, 1978, Tsang represented Hong Kong in the Miss International 1978 pageant that was held at the Mielparque in Tokyo, Japan, but she was not placed. Tsang was defeated by Katherine Ruth of United States.

In 1980, Tsang started her acting career.

In 1985, Tsang is Wan Yee (or Wen Yee, Chinese: 溫儀) in Sword Stained with Royal Blood, the 1985 wuxia TV series (TVB) adapted from Louis Cha's novel Sword Stained with Royal Blood. Tsang's character is the daughter of Wen Fangshan.

== Filmography ==
=== Films ===
- 1983 Gun is Law
- 1983 The Temptation
- 1984 The Express
- 1984 The Rape After - Li Ting Ting
- 1984 And Now What's Your Name - Francine Fan
- 1989 Banana Paradise

=== Television series ===
- 1982 Love and Passion - Tai Wan-Chi
- 1983 Farewell 19
- 1983 The Legend of the Condor Heroes (list of episodes) - Lau Ying, Aunt Ying
- 1985 Sword Stained with Royal Blood - Wan Yee
