= Pooi To Middle School =

Secondary school in Hong Kong

Coordinates: 22.330371°N 114.185609°E

Pooi To Middle School 香港培道中學

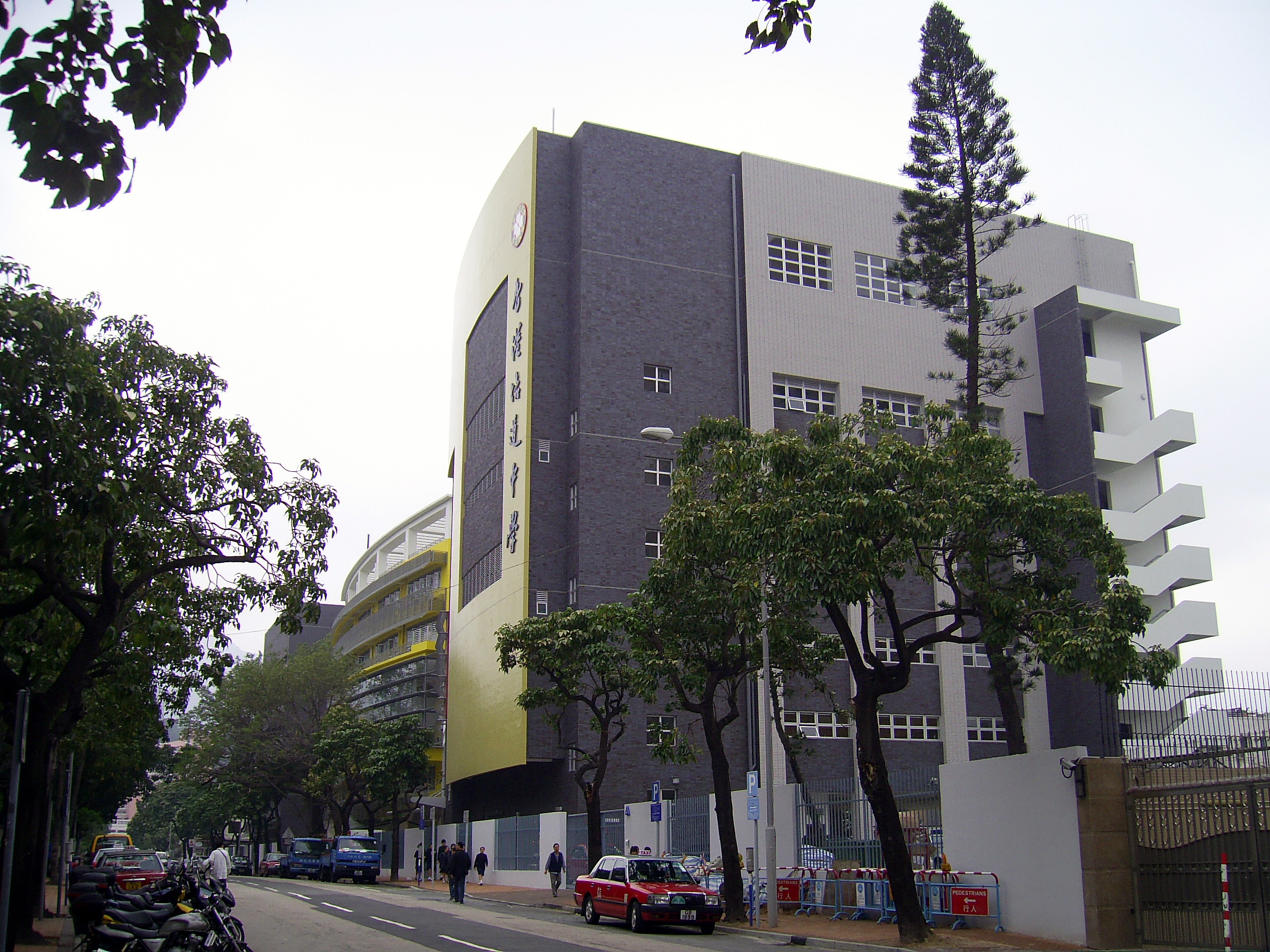
- Pooi To Middle School along Inverness Road, in 2009
- 2 Inverness Road, Kowloon City, Hong Kong

Information
- Motto: Love, Integrity, Purity and Perseverance
- Opened: 1888
- Principal: Ms. Constance Cheung
- Affiliation: Baptist Convention of Hong Kong
- Website: www.pooito.edu.hk

Pooi To Middle School
- Traditional Chinese: 香港培道中學
- Simplified Chinese: 香港培道中学
Transcriptions
Standard Mandarin
- Hanyu Pinyin: Xiānggǎng Péi Dào Zhōngxué
Yue: Cantonese
- Jyutping: hoeng1 gong2 pui4 dou6 zung1 hok6

Pooi To Middle School is a Baptist school in Kowloon City, Hong Kong. As one of the few Hong Kong schools with over a hundred years of history, it aims at nurturing young women to "speak confidently and think critically in bilingual learning environment".

In 2006, it was temporarily relocated to 101 Castle Peak Road, Sham Shui Po. The school has moved back to the current location on 18 March 2009, after the new campus was constructed.

== History ==
Missionary Emma Young, sent by the Foreign Mission Board based in USA, set up ‘Pooi To Academy’ in Guangzhou. Most women in Hong Kong at that time didn't have the chance to learn about Christianity. Also, they didn't have the opportunity to receive education, as the society was dominated by the ancient Chinese thinking that women should not be educated. Only five people enrolled in the first lesson on 3 March 1888.

In 1907, the school was relocated to Dongshan, Canton. Later in 1918, Pooi To Kindergarten, Primary School, Secondary School and Elementary Teacher Training School were established. Pooi To Academy was registered in 1930, and from then onwards it was managed by local Chinese. Ms Chan Yuen-so was appointed as principal in the same year.

In 1937(during World War II), an air raid occurred in Guangzhou after Lugouqiao Incident. Teachers and students fled to Zhaoqing where the school was reopened on 27 September 1937. By that time the number of students had increased greatly to 75. One year later, in 1938, the school was relocated again to Kwong Wah Street in Hong Kong. In 1941, the school collaborated with Pui Ching Secondary School to set up Pooi To Joint Secondary School in Ping Shek, Hong Kong. However, Hong Kong was occupied by the Japanese a year later, and Pooi To Middle School was then moved to Macau.

In 1945, war ended, Pooi To Middle School was reopened in Dongshan, Guangzhou. On the other hand, in September, a Hong Kong branch school was set up. In 1946, the Hong Kong branch was officially renamed as Hong Kong Pooi To Girls’ School. Again, it was relocated to No. 37 Grampian Road, Kowloon City, where the campus was shared by primary and secondary school students.

In 1952, the school successfully applied for the land in 2-8 Inverness Road to build a new campus, which was later officially opened by Madam Grantham (Maurine Samson, wife of Hong Kong Governor, Sir Alexander Grantham) on the opening ceremony. In 1959, a new building - ‘The Seventieth Anniversary Memorial Hall’ was constructed. Later in 1984, ‘Pooi To Corridor’ was built to link between the Main Hall and Memorial Hall.

Pooi To Middle School adopted the 5-year New Academic Structure in 1961. Four years later, in 1965, students sat for HKCEE (Hong Kong Certificate of Education Examination) and the passing rate was 95%. In 1975, Pooi To Middle School gradually became an Aided Secondary School.

== School Song ==
The school song is basically the same with the one of Guangzhou No.7 Middle School. However, Pooi To Middle School only takes the third verse as their school song. It is sung in Putonghua. The school song is a reminder for all students that no matter what happens, they should stay strong and keep the school motto -"Love, Integrity, Purity and Perseverance" in mind.

"培道同學兮，愛誠貞毅。
四德俱備兮，無往而畏。
當茲社會兮，釜鳴而螗沸。
毋惶毋惑兮，毋悲毋歔欷。
培道同學兮，記取愛誠貞毅"

== School motto ==
"Love, Integrity, Purity and Perseverance" is the school motto of Pooi To Middle School. The school aims at nurturing students to become loving, honest, pure and persevering girls. The school also hopes that students could keep these qualities as their future goals, even after they graduated from school.

== House ==
Unlike the other schools in Hong Kong, Pooi To Middle School runs a "one form-one house" system in which a form of students is grouped as one house only, i.e. each grade level works together in all inter-school competitions. Therefore, there will be a new house every year. The Chinese name of the house must include the ‘山(shan)’ ‘日(ri)’ ‘羽(yu)’.

== Campus ==
The campus of Pooi To Middle School has an area of about 15512 m^{2}. After completion of construction works in 2009, the campus now has four buildings.

The facilities include :

- 30 classrooms
- 3 small group teaching classrooms
- Student Activity Centre
- Meeting room
- Staff room
- Hall
- Lecture theatre
- Gymnasium
- Library
- Basketball court
- Green garden
- School's History Gallery
- Dancing room
- Canteen

== School emblem, and badge ==
=== School emblem ===
The four-leaf clover in the middle of the school emblem symbolizes love, faith, hope and blessing. It encourages students to cherish the grace and love of God, and to build an energetic life with faith and hope from God.

=== School badge ===
The school badge is composed of three colours: red, yellow and blue. Each colour conveys a different symbolic meaning - red represents passion and bravery; yellow represents energy and gentleness; blue represents rationality and calmness.

== Achievements ==
=== Academic ===
In the 2015 HKDSE (Hong Kong Diploma of Secondary Education), students of Pooi To Middle School achieved remarkable results. The percentages of number of students achieving level 2 in 15 subjects were higher than the overall average of Hong Kong. Also, 100% pass was achieved in 8 subjects (including English Language, Mathematics Module II, History, BAFS (Accounting), BAFS (Business), Economics, Chemistry and Visual Arts).

=== Extra-curricular Activities ===
Students of Pooi To Middle School also have outstanding performance on different extra-curricular activities, For example, students have achieved great results in Inter-school Athletics Competition, including:

- Inter-School Athletics Competition - (Group A Team) 2nd runner-up
- Inter-School Athletics Competition - (Group B Team) 3rd runner-up
- Inter-School Athletics Competition - (Overall) 4th runner-up
- Inter-School Swimming Competition - (Group A 4x50 Free-Style Relay) 2nd runner-up

== Language policy ==
Pooi To Middle School is a CMI school (Chinese as Medium of Instruction School) which focuses on Bilingual (Chinese and English) education. By applying such strategy, the school aims to let students learn better, as Chinese is the mother language of students. Still, students’ English subject results are comparable to, or even better than students from EMI schools (English as Medium of Instruction School). Pooi To Middle School has been acknowledged by the Hong Kong Education Bureau of its mastery of bilingual education.

== Curriculum ==
The school implements Bilingual education policy. Three out of four classes use English as the main medium of teaching, while one class uses Chinese. The key learning areas include Chinese Language, English Language, Mathematics, Liberal Studies, Science Education, Technology Education, Arts Education, Physical Education and Personal, Social and Humanities Studies.

== Notable alumnae ==
- Monica Chan (artist)
- Jessica Hester Hsuan (artist)
- Eman Lam (singer)
- Michael Chugani (TVB News anchor)
- Johnny Yip (singer)

== See also ==
- Education in Hong Kong
- List of secondary schools in Hong Kong
