= Hitman (1998 film) =

1998 Hong Kong film by Stephen Tung

- Film poster

Chinese name
- Traditional Chinese: 殺手之王
- Simplified Chinese: 杀手之王
Transcriptions
Standard Mandarin
- Hanyu Pinyin: Shā Shǒu Zhī Wáng
Yue: Cantonese
- Jyutping: Sat3 Sau2 Zi1 Wong4
- Directed by: Stephen Tung
- Written by: Chan Hing-kai; Vincent Kok; Cheng Kam-fu
- Produced by: Gordon Chan
- Starring: Jet Li; Eric Tsang; Simon Yam; Gigi Leung
- Cinematography: Arthur Wong
- Edited by: Cheung Ka-fai
- Music by: Jussi Tegelman
- Production companies: China Star Entertainment Group; Win's Entertainment; Flea Market Production
- Distributed by: China Star Entertainment Group
- Release date: 3 April 1998
- Running time: 105 minutes
- Country: Hong Kong
- Languages: Cantonese; English; Japanese; Mandarin
- Box office: HK$10,296,852

Hitman (simplified Chinese: 杀手之王; traditional Chinese: 殺手之王), is a 1998 Hong Kong action film directed by Stephen Tung. The film stars Jet Li, Eric Tsang, Simon Yam and Gigi Leung. The film was released on 3 April 1998.

== Plot ==
In Hong Kong, a mysterious hitman known as the King of Killers has murdered a wealthy ex-Yakuza crime boss Tsukamoto. Because Tsukamoto had established a revenge fund in case of an assassination, a US $100 million bounty is placed upon the King. The deceased's power hungry grandson, Eiji, becomes the new head of the Tsukamoto family and one of the bounty hunters.

Fu, a former soldier, is part of a small gang that learns of the bounty. Fu attempts to enter the building where Tsukamoto's lawyers are discussing the terms of the revenge fund, but he is rebuffed by the security. When he defends himself, his martial arts skills attract the attention of Lo, a seedy small-time criminal. Lo is also seeking the bounty on the King of Killers. He hires Fu as his muscle. They are warned not to pursue the case further by Inspector Chan, a member of the Hong Kong Security Bureau. To test Fu's abilities, Lo takes on a small contract to kill a local gang member, while also outfitting Fu and allowing him to live in his home. Fu soon meets Kiki, Lo's daughter, who is a successful attorney and ashamed of her father's sleazy activities.

Martin, the head lawyer in charge of Tsukamoto's revenge fund, makes the discovery that prior to his death, the crime lord was forced to swallow old Chinese wartime promissory notes. He sells this information to the bounty hunters, and as Eiji is willing to pay the highest amount, he is the first to learn the serial codes on the notes. Fu and Lo follow Eiji to a small apartment complex, where they learn that the suspect is an old man, Uncle Leung, an acquaintance of Lo's he had previously been trying to locate. Despite their best efforts fighting off multiple Yakuza hitmen and a grenade-wielding assassin disguised as a priest, Fu and Lo are unable to extract Leung, who suffers a heart attack and dies during their escape and is then shot in the head by Eiji.

Back at Lo's apartment, Lo comes clean with Fu: Years ago, he had met Uncle Leung, and in talking with him learned the old man was a veteran whose entire family was killed by the Japanese during the Second Sino-Japanese War. Now Leung wanted vengeance on his family's murderers, but the only wealth he possessed were the aforementioned promissory notes. Taking pity on him, Lo told Leung to hold onto the notes and, in the event of the murder of the Japanese man he wanted dead, cash them in and forward the money to his bank account. Lo had only recently learned that Tsukamoto was the man Leung wanted to have killed, and once the crime lord had been assassinated by the King of Killers, Leung had done what Lo asked and forwarded the money from the notes to Lo's bank account. This had created a paper trail that implicated Lo as the King.

Before Fu and Lo can plan further, the apartment is attacked by two bounty hunters. They are able to barely escape, and Lo makes plans to disappear to mainland China. Before they leave, they decide to attend Kiki's graduation party. At the event, Fu once again meets Inspector Chan and deduces that the inspector is actually the real King when he slips that he knows Lo is not really the wanted assassin. Fu and Lo go to Eiji's penthouse to meet Martin, where Fu shoots Lo and demands to cash in on the bounty. Martin however informs them that Eiji has changed the terms of the fund so that no matter who kills the King, he will be the one who receives the money.

A massive fight ensues in the penthouse and soon Inspector Chan arrives as the King to help Fu and Lo. They are able to kill Eiji and all of his men, leaving Martin to rewrite the terms of the fund. Later, they are seen together, dividing up the money and discussing their future plans. Chan retires, and he recruits Fu to act as the new King.

== Cast ==
- Jet Li as Fu, the main character of the film, an extremely skilled melee fighter, but also a naive and inexperienced hitman in training who eventually becomes the new King
- Simon Yam as Officer Chan Kwan, a capable and determined detective who is actually the dangerous vigilante King of Killers alter ego
- Eric Tsang as Ngok Lo, a self-proclaimed "rat bastard" who makes the rent by any means necessary and is a notorious liar and cheater
- Gigi Leung as Kiki, Ngok Lo's daughter, an intelligent and beautiful lawyer who is exasperated with her father's misdoings
- Sato Keiji as Eiji Tsukamoto, a ruthless and focused yakuza member who seeks the bounty on his grandfather's killer
- Paul Rapovski as The Tall Guy, Tsukamoto's lead bodyguard and a skilled, if not cheap, fighter
- Ip Kwong-kim as Martin, a lawyer in charge of the revenge fund who is not above lying to make a profit
- Hideri Meiken as Sasaki, a Japanese karate practitioner who is Tsukamoto's bodyguard
- Sahara Kenji as Tsukamoto, a sleazy and notorious ex-yakuza boss who is assassinated by the King at the beginning of the film
- Timmy Ho as David Wu, a detective in charge of finding and exposing the King
- Ching Tung as Kau, a small town triad lieutenant who was briefly Fu's boss
- Frankie Ng as a father and triad boss at an amusement park who was erroneously believed to be the King
- Nunzio Caponio as MI5 Agent

== Release ==
On 16 October 2000, DVD was released by Hong Kong Legends in the United Kingdom in Region 2. Five years later, The Jet Li Collection DVD was released on 25 July 2005 at a 2 disc set including The Master. In 2002, an edited version with a hip-hop soundtrack was released on DVD in the United States as Contract Killer.

== Reception ==
Derek Elley of Variety called it "an above-average blend of comedy and action". Scott Hill of PopMatters reviewed the Contract Killer edit of the film, calling it "a diluted reissue" and advised viewers to watch original with subtitles to "see the real film".

== Accolades ==
Accolades
Ceremony	Category	Recipient	Result
18th Hong Kong Film Awards	Best Action Choreography	Stephen Tung	Nominated
35th Golden Horse Awards	Best Action Choreography	Stephen Tung	Nominated

== See also ==
- List of Hong Kong films
