= The Rough Ride =

- Starring: Tony Leung; Barbara Yung; Lau Dan; Ray Lui; Ha Yu; Michael Tao; Bobby Au Yeung
- Opening theme: "我與你 他與我" (Me and You, He and Me) by Anita Mui
- Composer: Joseph Koo
- Country of origin: Hong Kong
- Original language: Cantonese
- No. of episodes: 40

Production
- Running time: 45 minutes (40 episodes)

Original release
- Network: TVB
- Release: 22 April – 14 June 1985

The Rough Ride (挑戰) is a TVB television series, premiered in 1985. Theme song "Me and You, He and Me" (我與你 他與我) composition and arrangement by Joseph Koo, lyricist by Wong Jim, sung by Anita Mui.

The Rough Ride is Barbara Yung's posthumous work.

== Cast ==
- Ray Lui as Kong Tin-wai
- 陳敏兒 Chan Man Yee as Lam Siu Man
- Tony Leung as Chow Kim-hung
- Barbara Yung as Tse Bik-wah
- Lau Dan
- Ha Yu as Tsau Cheung-Yau
- Michael Tao
- Bobby Au Yeung as Tsuen
