= The New Adventures of Chor Lau-heung (1984 TV series) =

1984 Hong Kong TV series

- Hong Kong DVD edition
- 楚留香之蝙蝠傳奇
- Genre: Wuxia
- Based on: Chu Liuxiang Series by Gu Long
- Screenplay by: Tsang Shu-kuen; Ho Yiu-wang; Kwan Chin-bok
- Directed by: Johnnie To; Siu Hin-fai; Kuk Kwok-leung; Fan Sau-ming; Si-to Lap-kwong; Sung Ho-fai
- Starring: Michael Miu; Barbara Yung; Simon Yam; Austin Wai; Mini Kung; Sharon Yeung; Lau Dan; Chow Sau-lan; Cecilia Fong; Cheung Ying-choi; Kwok Fung; Lee Heung-kam; Benz Hui; Ng Man-tat; Kwan Hoi-san
- Theme music composer: Michael Lai
- Opening theme: "Laughing and Traversing Rivers and Mountains" (笑踏河山) by Roman Tam
- Country of origin: Hong Kong
- Original language: Cantonese
- No. of episodes: 40

Production
- Producer: Siu Sang
- Running time: ≈ 45 minutes per episode
- Production company: TVB

Original release
- Network: TVB
- Release: 12 November 1984 – 4 January 1985

The New Adventures of Chor Lau-heung (楚留香之蝙蝠傳奇) is a Hong Kong wuxia television series adapted from the Chu Liuxiang Series by Gu Long. Michael Miu starred as the titular protagonist, Chu Liuxiang (Chor Lau-heung). The series was first broadcast on TVB from 12 November 1984 to 4 January 1985. It was rerun in Hong Kong on TVB Jade from 1 February to 30 March in 2006.

== Synopsis ==
Chu Liuxiang takes his three companions (Li Hongxiu, Su Rongrong and Song Tian'er) with him to attend Zuo Qinghou's birthday party. On the way, they meet Sang Xiaojing, a spoilt and arrogant girl. After arriving at Zuo's house, strange things start happening. Zuo's daughter, Mingli, is in love with Xue Bin, a youth from a rival family. Xue Yin, Xue Bin's younger sister, is in love with Ye Shenglan and wants to be with him, but her father forbids her because Ye Shenglan is an actor. Zuo Mingli and Xue Yin fake their deaths in order to resolve the feuds between their families, but Chu Liuxiang discovers the truth and decides to secretly help the lovers be together.

== Cast ==
- Michael Miu as Chu Liuxiang
- Barbara Yung as Sang Xiaojing
- Simon Yam as Yuan Suiyun
- Austin Wai as Zhongyuan Yidianhong
- Chan Wing-chun as Hu Tiehua
- Chow Sau-lan as Jin Lingzhi
- Sharon Yeung as Gao Ya'nan
- Mimi Kung as Hua Zhenzhen
- Wong Wan-choi as Ye Shenglan
- Amy Wu as Xue Yin
- Bobby Au-yeung as Xue Bin
- Wong Man-yee as Zuo Mingli
- Cheung Ying-choi as the Emperor
- Kwan Hoi-san as Xue Yiren
- Leung San as Master Kumei
- Lee Heung-kam as Lady Jin
- Ko Miu-see as Dong Sanniang
- Benz Hui as Zuo Qinghou
- Kwok Fung as Ying Wanli
- Chun Wong as Xue Xiaoren
- Lui Ching-hung as Su Rongrong
- Chi Pui-fan as Li Hongxiu
- Lau Miu-ling as Song Tian'er
- Hui Kin-bong as Ding Feng
- Lau Dan as Wuhua
- Tsui Man-wah as Shuimu Yinji
- Sandra Lang as Shiguanyin
