= The Other Side of the Horizon =

Hong Kong television series

- DVD cover
- 魔域桃源
- Genre: Wuxia
- Written by: Cheung Wah-piu
- Starring: Andy Lau; Lawrence Ng; Angie Chiu; Elaine Chow; Shih Kien; Chu Tit-wo
- Theme music composer: Joseph Koo
- Opening theme: The Demon Region Paradise (魔域桃源) by Roman Tam
- Country of origin: Hong Kong
- Original language: Cantonese
- No. of episodes: 20

Production
- Producer: Raymond Lee
- Production location: Hong Kong
- Camera setup: Multi camera
- Production company: TVB

Original release
- Network: TVB Jade
- Release: 3 September – 28 September 1984

The Other Side of the Horizon
- Traditional Chinese: 魔域桃源
- Simplified Chinese: 魔域桃源
- Literal meaning: "The Demon Region Paradise"
Transcriptions
Standard Mandarin
- Hanyu Pinyin: Mó Yù Táo Yuán
Yue: Cantonese
- Jyutping: Mo1 Wik6 Tou4 Jyun4

The Other Side of the Horizon is a 1984 Hong Kong wuxia television series starring Andy Lau, Lawrence Ng and Angie Chiu. Produced by TVB with Raymond Lee serving as producer, the series ran on its channel Jade from 3 to 28 September 1984.

== Plot ==
During the Yongle period of the Ming Dynasty, a "Demon Region" appeared in the martial world. The "Demon Region" left a trail of destruction and gave hardships for the livelihood of people.

In order to eliminate the "Demon Region", the Wudang Sect dispatches a group of elite disciples to attack. The disciples fail to do so and Mo Chan-chi (Chu Tit-wo), head of the Sect, pushes the blame to disciples Fu Ching-wan (Andy Lau) and Mo-yung Pak (Lawrence Ng). Because of this, the entire martial world is hunting after Fu and Mo-yung, and the two of them eventually take refuge to the "Demon".

Fu and Mo-yung, however, were surprised to discover that the "Demon Region" is not an actual demon region, but is in fact, is an utopian society. It also turns out that Fu and Mo-yung were actually sent undercover by the Wudang Sect to investigate the "Demon Region". Under the sabotage of Mo-yun, the citizens of the "Demon Region" turn against each other and massacre one another. Fu, on the other hand, was deceived by Mo, which led Fu Chin-san (Shih Kien), leader of "Demon Region", to consume poisoned wine. "Demon Region" was ultimately destroyed by the many sects of the martial world.

However, unexpected to Fu, who is in deep regret, Fu Chin-san turns out to be his biological father. When he was about to confront Mo Chan-chi about this matter, he accidentally kills Mo, who at the time was battling with Mo-yung. Because of this, Fu, who was named the "Young Warrior of Wudang", is now known as the "Son of the Demon Region". Mo-yung is then appointed as the successor to the head of Wudang where he kills Fu Chin-san, who has lost his martial arts ability due to consuming poison. Originally like brothers, Fu and Mo-yung have now become sworn enemies, leading the martial world into a bloody storm.

== Cast ==
- Andy Lau as Fu Ching-wan (傅青雲)
- Lawrence Ng as Mo-yung Pak (慕容白)
- Angie Chiu as Tong Kei (唐琪)
- Elaine Chow as Cho Yin-hon (楚煙寒)
- Shih Kien as Fu Chin-san (傅千山)
- Chu Tit-wo as Mo Chan-chi (無塵子)
- Wong Wan-choi as Mok Pat-chi (莫不痴)
- Lisa Lui as Lam Chi-kwan (林芷君)
- Yeung Chak-lam as Fu Chin-sek (傅千石)

== See also ==
- Andy Lau filmography
- List of TVB series (1984)
- The Peach Blossom Spring, a popular Chinese fable by Tao Yuanming which inspired the subject matter of the series.
