= Barbara Yung =

Hong Kong actress

- 翁美玲
- Portrait of Yung
- Born: 7 May 1959; British Hong Kong
- Died: 14 May 1985 (aged 26); Hong Kong Baptist Hospital, Kowloon Tong, British Hong Kong
- Cause of death: Suicide
- Burial place: Cambridge City Cemetery
- Education: Rosaryhill School; Anglia Ruskin University; Central School of Art and Design
- Occupation: Actress
- Years active: 1982–1985
- Parent(s): Weng Ming Chang (Father); Liu Ming Yee (Mother)

Chinese name
- Chinese: 翁美玲
Transcriptions
Standard Mandarin
- Hanyu Pinyin: Wēng Měilíng
Yue: Cantonese
- Jyutping: Jung1 Mei5 Ling4

Barbara Yung Mei-ling (Chinese: 翁美玲, 7 May 1959 – 14 May 1985) was a popular Hong Kong actress during the early to mid 1980s. Yung died of suicide by gas inhalation at the age of 26, during the peak of her career. One of her major roles was Huang Rong in The Legend of the Condor Heroes and was named as one of the Seven Fairies of TVB.

== Education ==
Yung was born in Hong Kong on 7 May 1959 to a civil service family as an only child. Her childhood was relatively uneventful until the death of her father when she was aged 7.

At 15, Yung left Hong Kong for England in late 1974 to join her mother who had migrated to the United Kingdom (TVB K100 Feature Interview, 1985). Yung, her mother and a family friend, whom Yung considered her "uncle", first moved to Barkingside, Ilford, near London. According to her interview with K100, she took a grammar school exam on her arrival in the United Kingdom and successfully entered Ilford County High School for Girls. Together as a family, they later settled in Histon, a small village in Cambridge. There, the adults operated a small fish and chips shop where Yung helped out during the weekends.

While in Hong Kong, Yung attended Rosaryhill School (located at Stubbs Road in Hong Kong), where she had completed her primary and some of her secondary education through Form 4 (TVB K100, 1985). She continued with her GCE O levels at a secondary school in Cambridge. After the completion of her 'O' levels, she was admitted to a 2-year foundations program at the Anglia Ruskin University (CCAT). Upon the completion of this program, she went to London to study textile design at the Central School of Art and Design. She spent 4 years at this school and graduated with a bachelor's degree (TVB K100 Feature Interview, 1985).

== Career ==
Yung returned to Hong Kong and joined the Miss Hong Kong pageant in 1982, in which she was awarded 8th place. After the pageant, she was offered an acting contract by TVB. She made her acting debut in 1982, in a Cantonese wuxia series named Sup Sam Mui also known as The Legend of the Unknowns set in the Qing dynasty, co-starring Kent Tong and Simon Yam in which Yung played a Manchu princess, Princess Sheung (TVB K100 Feature Interview, 1985). This was the TV drama that shot her into the limelight. Although Yung played a relatively minor role in this drama, she managed to gain TVB's confidence to cast her in what would become the drama (The Legend of the Condor Heroes) that would make her a household name in Hong Kong, Singapore, China, Taiwan, Malaysia, Indonesia, Thailand, Vietnam and other countries with sizeable especially Cantonese-speaking populations in the 1980s. Her popularity persists through present day due to her lead role in The Legend of the Condor Heroes, earning her the title of the "Huang Rong Forever" (TVB K100 Feature Interview, 1985).

=== Rise to fame ===
Yung's most famous TVB swordplay series was The Legend of the Condor Heroes in which she portrayed the character Wong Yung. TVB made several costumed/period dramas in the 1980s based on famous martial arts swordplay novels by Louis Cha. Cha's The Legend of the Condor Heroes has been adapted numerous times to TV dramas and film, but none has attained a popularity as the one made by TVB in 1983. The innocent swordsman, Kwok Ching was played by Felix Wong. The cast in this edition also featured Michael Miu, Sharon Yeung, Patrick Tse and Louise Lee and it became one of the most watched TVB series by Chinese people in Hong Kong, Southeast Asia and around the world.

In 1984, The Fearless Duo had an average rating of 61, and became the highest-rated drama series of the year, which shows Yung's popularity at that time.

Yung's other TV dramas included The Foundation, The Man in the Middle, United We Stand, The New Adventures of Chor Lau-heung, The Rough Ride and The Battlefield.

=== Death ===
Yung was found unconscious due to gas inhalation in her apartment on Broadcast Drive, Kowloon on the morning of 14 May 1985. According to her friend (who was rumoured to have begun courting Yung), Stephen Chow Sai-lung, Yung had called him on the night of 13 May 1985. Chow asserted that she was troubled by her failed relationship with Kent Tong Chun-yip. After hanging up, Chow was worried and went to her apartment. However, he could not gain access to her apartment. He then thought that no one was home and left.

Chow returned to Yung's apartment on the morning of 14 May 1985. He knocked on Yung's door again but no one answered. Chow said he smelled gas fumes through Yung's apartment door. He then climbed up the outside wall of the apartment building to her second-floor apartment and pried open her front window. He entered Yung's apartment (from the window) and discovered her unconscious and sprawled on the living room floor. Chow immediately alerted building security and the police. Yung was rushed to the nearby Baptist Hospital in Kowloon where she was pronounced dead on arrival.

There were many rumours regarding the cause of her death. Some had attributed it to an accident, suicide or perhaps even foul play. One of the most widely circulated rumours was that her suicide was the result of her depression over her supposed broken relationship with then-TVB actor, Kent Tong Chun-yip. (In an interview conducted by a Hong Kong radio station on 14 March 1985, when asked about rumours regarding her relationship with Kent, Yung had explained that he was merely a friend and respected colleague.) The rumours concerning the association of her death with Kent were largely based on Chow's account of her last 24 hours. There were also rumours which claimed that Chow was then Yung's boyfriend. According to Yung's TVB colleagues, she behaved normally in the days before her death and did not appear depressed or suicidal. Yung sounded very optimistic about her future in her radio interviews on 14 March 1985 and two weeks before her death.

Yung left no suicide note. At the time of her death, Yung was involved in filming the final chapters of the TVB drama, The Battlefield, and had just started filming King of Ideas (桥王之王) a.k.a. The Feud That Never Was (拆档拍档) with co-star Kent Tong. Her remaining scenes were assigned to fellow actress Maggie Cheung.

Yung's funeral was a big event and was attended by throngs of fans and many prominent Hong Kong celebrities. Her remains were placed in the World Funeral Parlor, Hung Hom, Kowloon for fans and friends to pay their final respect. Her friends and co-stars in her TV dramas such as Michael Miu, Felix Wong, Tony Leung Chiu-wai, and Andy Lau were pallbearers for her casket. Yung had a Catholic funeral as the Roman Catholic Diocese of Hong Kong did not believe her suicide was intentional or willful. She was cremated in Hong Kong on 19 May 1985 and her ashes were brought back and laid to rest at the Cambridge City Cemetery in Cambridge, England.

The death of Yung aroused society's attention to the mental health of artists leading to the establishment of the Hong Kong Artistes Christian Fellowship at the behest of Cheung Ming Ming, one of the last persons Yung reached out to prior to her death. Cheung worries other actresses in crisis could follow Yung's route, and provided a future home for artists to network and support each other. Its current president is Sheren Tang who debuted at TVB the same year as Yung's death, and was once referred to as Barbara Yung's successor due to her similar youthful look, and personality.

=== Grave stone ===
Yung's grave stone in Cambridge city cemetery continues to be visited by Chinese fans who remember her role in the 1983 Condor Heroes production. In 2017 the original white stone with black lettering was replaced by a dark stone with golden lettering that also marks the death of her mother (1926-2017). The golden lettering on a dark background is common to several gravestones in the area, but Yung's stone is distinctive in that it is heart-shaped and includes black-and-white photographs of both individuals.

== Filmography ==
Year	Chinese Title	English Title	Role	Notes
1982	十三妹	The Legend of the Unknowns	Princess Sheung	
1983	射鵰英雄傳之鐵血丹心	The Legend of the Condor Heroes: The Iron-Blooded Loyalists	Wong Yung	
1983	射鵰英雄傳之東邪西毒	The Legend of the Condor Heroes: Eastern Heretic and Western Venom	Wong Yung	
1983	射鵰英雄傳之華山論劍	The Legend of the Condor Heroes: The Duel on Mount Hua	Wong Yung	
1983	夹心人	The Man in the Middle	Tung Pui-man	
1984	決戰玄武門	The Foundation	Chun Sik-sik	
1984	天師執位	The Fearless Duo	Lam Chor-yin	
1984	生銹橋王	United We Stand	Lam Pui-ying, Ho Doh-wan	
1984	楚留香之蝙蝠傳奇	The New Adventures of Chor Lau-heung	Song Siu-ching/Princess Wing-ching	
1985	挑戰	The Rough Ride	Tse Bik-wah	
1985	楚河漢界	The Battlefield	Yuk Dip-yee	

== Awards and ranking ==
- 1983: Top Ten Star Golden Globe Awards
- 1984: Top Ten Star Golden Globe Awards
- Ranked among the top ten in the "Tvb Superstar 100 Ranking" selected by Hong Kong TVB Guide Magazine
- In 2007, she was selected as one of the Top Ten Classic TV Characters Hong Kong Apple Daily Selected Top 100 Classic TV Characters, and Barbara Yung role as Huang Rong In Legend of the Condor Heroes (1983 TV series), it won tenth place in the audience vote. (Source: Hong Kong Apple Daily, 17 November 2007, Issue C14&15)
- TVB 55th Anniversary Celebrating Hong Kong. Earlier, it launched the audience voting activity of "I Choose, I Want to Watch". In Unforgettable... and this drama, The Fearless Duo starring Barbara Yung and Michael Miu (first broadcast in 1984) took the first place with 29.8% of the total votes.
