= List of The Legend of the Condor Heroes episodes (1983) =

The Legend of the Condor Heroes is a Hong Kong television series first broadcast on TVB Jade in 1983. A total of 59 episodes were produced.

== Episodes ==
=== The Iron-Blooded Loyalists (鐵血丹心) ===
No. overall	No. in season	Title	Directed by	Written by	Original release date
1	1	"Episode 1"	Johnnie To 杜琪峯	Johnnie To 杜琪峯	February 21, 1983
Qiu Chuji gets acquainted with Guo Xiaotian and Yang Tiexin, whose wives (Li Ping and Bao Xiruo, respectively) are both pregnant. By order from Wanyan Honglie, Guo Xiaotian is killed and Li Ping is detained by Duan Tiande. Bao Xiruo is kept by Wanyan Honglie while Yang Tiexin goes on the run. Qiu Chuji goes on search for Li Ping and Bao Xiruo. Duan Tiande takes refuge in his uncle, a Buddhist monk. To counter Qiu Chuji, the monk calls for help from the Seven Freaks of Jiangnan.
2	2	"Episode 2"	Johnnie To 杜琪峯	Johnnie To 杜琪峯	February 22, 1983
Ke Zhen'e holds a grudge against Qiu Chuji, so Qiu Chuji proposes a duel in 18 years between Yang Kang, who will be raised by him, and Guo Jing, who will be raised by the Seven Freaks. Wanyan Honglie proposes to Bao Xiruo and she reluctantly accepts for the sake of her baby.
3	3	"Episode 3"	Lau Si‑yuk 劉仕裕	Lau Si‑yuk 劉仕裕	February 23, 1983
Guo Jing is trained by Jebe and becomes best friends with Temujin's son, Tolui. The Seven Freaks finally find Guo Jing, but they also discover Mei Chaofeng and Chen Xuanfeng, the people who blinded Ke Zhen'e. They succeed in blinding Mei Chaofeng and Guo Jing kills Chen Xuanfeng. The Seven Freaks then starts training Guo Jing in martial arts.
4	4	"Episode 4"	Lau Si‑yuk 劉仕裕	Lau Si‑yuk 劉仕裕	February 24, 1983
Wanyan Honglie and Wanyan Hongxi visit Temujin to confer him a title. An envoy from the Naiman tribe comes and threatens to attack them if their leader is not bestowed an equal title. Temujin sends Jebe and Guo Jing to assassinate Naiman military leaders. After they successfully finish this mission, Temujin's army eliminates the Naiman tribe.
5	5	"Episode 5"	Ng Yat‑fan 吳一帆	Ng Yat‑fan 吳一帆	February 25, 1983
Wanyan Honglie tries to turn Temujin's brother, Sangkun, against him. The situation is further complicated because Temujin's daughter, Huazheng, is in love with Guo Jing and rejects approaches by Dushi, Sangkun's son. Dushi challenges Guo Jing to a duel, and Guo Jing defeats him soundly. Because Huazheng threatens to kill herself, Tolui forces Guo Jing to marry her.
6	6	"Episode 6"	Ng Yat‑fan 吳一帆	Ng Yat‑fan 吳一帆	February 28, 1983
While fighting against Mei Chaofeng, Guo Jing's fifth teacher dies. Guo Jing runs into Yin Zhiping, a disciple of Qiu Chuji, who conveys a letter about the upcoming duel against Yang Kang. Because he deems Guo Jing's martial arts skills as insufficient, Ke Zhen'e plans to train Guo Jing intensively for six months.
7	7	"Episode 7"	Siu Hin‑fai 蕭顯輝	Siu Hin‑fai 蕭顯輝	March 1, 1983
While Guo Jing is training, Ke Zhen'e notices several moves that he never taught him. His teachers suspect that he has been taking lessons from Mei Chaofeng. Later, Ma Yu reveals himself to the Six Freaks as Guo Jing's secret teacher. Meanwhile, Guo Jing eavesdrops a conversation where Sangkun is planning to kill Temujin.
8	8	"Episode 8"	Siu Hin‑fai 蕭顯輝	Siu Hin‑fai 蕭顯輝	March 2, 1983
Guo Jing arrives in time to save Temujin from Dushi. Temujin then attacks Sangkun's tribe and eliminates them. Mei Chaofeng kidnaps Huazheng but does not kill her because she empathizes with Huazheng's unrequited love for Guo Jing. The Six Freaks and Ma Yu rescue Huazheng.
9	9	"Episode 9"	Yu Hoi-Wing 余凱榮	Yu Hoi-Wing 余凱榮	March 3, 1983
In preparation for the duel, Guo Jing and the Six Freaks go back to the mainland. His teachers think that although Guo Jing has learned martial arts from them, he has yet to learn to be independent. For this reason, they leave him to roam alone and collect some experience. Guo Jing meets a young beggar who keeps following him around.
10	10	"Episode 10"	Yu Hoi-Wing 余凱榮	Yu Hoi-Wing 余凱榮	March 4, 1983
Guo Jing and the little beggar witness the kidnapping of Mu Nianci by Ouyang Ke from the White Camel Mountain. After rescuing her, they meet Yang Tiexin, Mu Nianci's adopted father. The little beggar reveals herself as Huang Rong, a beautiful girl. Sha Tongtian and Lingzhi Shangren are curious about Guo Jing and his new friend. They set a trap for them in the forest.
11	11	"Episode 11"	Lau Si‑yuk 劉仕裕	Lau Si‑yuk 劉仕裕	March 7, 1983
Yang Kang bumps into Mu Nianci and falls in love with her. Although he is still trained by Qiu Chuji, he also secretly learns from Mei Chaofeng. Yang Tiexin holds a martial arts contest in search of a husband for Mu Nianci. Yang Kang wins the contest handily but then claims that he's just playing games. Guo Jing is angry and fights Yang Kang, only to be beaten with Jiuyin Baigu Claw.
12	12	"Episode 12"	Lau Si‑yuk 劉仕裕	Lau Si‑yuk 劉仕裕	March 8, 1983
Wang Chuyi saves Guo Jing. To apologize, Yang Kang invites both Wang Chuyi and Guo Jing to a banquet, but it's just a ruse to arrest Guo Jing. While fighting their way out, Wang Chuyi is poisoned.
13	13	"Episode 13"	Ng Yat‑fan 吳一帆	Ng Yat‑fan 吳一帆	March 9, 1983
While looking for the antidote for Wang Chuyi, Guo Jing bites a large snake, and this makes him immune of all poisons. This makes the snake's owner, Liang Ziweng, now want to drink Guo Jing's blood. While being chased, Guo Jing and Huang Rong falls into a cave and meets by Mei Chaofeng. With her help, they escape from Ouyang Ke and Liang Ziweng.
14	14	"Episode 14"	Ng Yat‑fan 吳一帆	Ng Yat‑fan 吳一帆	March 10, 1983
Bao Xiruo tells Yang Kang that Yang Tiexin is actually his father and not Wanyan Honglie. Yang Kang feels conflicted about this and tries to live for a while as a Song citizen without the comfort and wealth of the palace, but when he suffers from the abuse by Jin soldiers, he returns to Wanyan Honglie.
15	15	"Episode 15"	Johnnie To 杜琪峯	Johnnie To 杜琪峯	March 11, 1983
Guo Jing is reunited with the Six Freaks, who dislikes Huang Rong. They try to marry him to Mu Nianci. Furious, Huang Rong tries to use Mei Chaofeng to kill the Six Freaks.
16	16	"Episode 16"	Johnnie To 杜琪峯	Johnnie To 杜琪峯	March 14, 1983
By promising to convince her father to forgive Mei Chaofeng, Huang Rong gets her to release the Six Freaks. Mu Nianci tries to reunite Yang Tiexin and Bao Xiruo.
17	17	"Episode 17"	Siu Hin‑fai 蕭顯輝	Siu Hin‑fai 蕭顯輝	March 15, 1983
Bao Xiruo leaves Wanyan Honglie for Yang Tiexin. Huang Rong makes a plan to kill Wanyan Honglie during a celebration for him. Unfortunately, the bomb fails to explode and Wanyan Honglie escapes unscathed.
18	18	"Episode 18"	Yu Hoi-Wing 余凱榮	Yu Hoi-Wing 余凱榮	March 16, 1983
Qiu Chuji arrests Yang Kang and forces him to follow Yang Tiexin. Secretly, Yang Kang leaves a trail of Jiuyin Baigu Claw so Wanyan Honglie can find him.
19	19	"Episode 19"	Yu Hoi-Wing 余凱榮	Yu Hoi-Wing 余凱榮	March 17, 1983
Cornered by Wanyan Honglie's forces, both Yang Tiexin and Bao Xiruo commit suicide. After defeating Yang Kang in a duel, Guo Jing leaves for Peach Blossom Island with Huang Rong.

=== The Eastern Heretic and Western Venom (東邪西毒) ===
No. overall	No. in season	Title	Directed by	Written by	Original release date
20	1	"Episode 1"	Johnnie To 杜琪峯	Johnnie To 杜琪峯	April 18, 1983
Yue Wen, who has the Book of Wumu, plans to give it to the Song government to defeat the Jins. However, he is killed by Ouyang Ke's snake. The book is then taken by a mysterious old beggar.
21	2	"Episode 2"	Johnnie To 杜琪峯	Johnnie To 杜琪峯	April 19, 1983
The old beggar turns out to be Hong Qigong. He delivers the Book of Wumu to the government, but the Song emperor ignores it. Tolui comes to steal it for Mongolia, accompanied by Huazheng. However, Tolui is kidnapped by Yang Kang's men.
22	3	"Episode 3"	Lau Si‑yuk 劉仕裕	Lau Si‑yuk 劉仕裕	April 20, 1983
Ouyang Ke tells Huazheng to put poison in Hong Qigong's wine, or else Tolui will be killed. The weakened Hong Qigong is then injured in a fight against Mei Chaofeng. They manage to free Tolui, but Huazheng is injured by Yang Kang's Jiuyin Baigu Claw.
23	4	"Episode 4"	Lau Si‑yuk 劉仕裕	Lau Si‑yuk 劉仕裕	April 21, 1983
Huang Rong agrees to cure Huazheng. Meanwhile, Huang Yaoshi comes looking for his daughter. Since Huang Rong thinks that Guo Jing loves Huazheng, she leaves with her father.
24	5	"Episode 5"	Ng Yat‑fan 吳一帆	Ng Yat‑fan 吳一帆	April 22, 1983
While on the run from Mongolian soldiers, Yang Kang is saved by Mu Nianci. She begs Guo Jing to save Yang Kang because he knows about Mongolian poisons.
25	6	"Episode 6"	Ng Yat‑fan 吳一帆	Ng Yat‑fan 吳一帆	April 25, 1983
Yang Kang finds Wanyan Honglie and follows him back to the palace. Guo Jing is reunited with Huang Rong and decide to help a star-crossed couple, Lu Guanying and Cheng Yaojia.
26	7	"Episode 7"	Siu Hin‑fai 蕭顯輝	Siu Hin‑fai 蕭顯輝	April 26, 1983
Lu Guanying arrests Yang Kang and Duan Tiande. While trying to save Yang Kang, Mu Nianci gets help from Mei Chaofeng. Besides Mei Chaofeng, Qiu Qianren from Iron Palm Sect and the Six Freaks also show up.
27	8	"Episode 8"	Siu Hin‑fai 蕭顯輝	Siu Hin‑fai 蕭顯輝	April 27, 1983
Yang Kang kills Duan Tiande and swears to become brothers with Guo Jing, but in the end he goes back to Wanyan Honglie. To help Lu Guanying, Huang Rong pretends to be a maid and works for Cheng Yaojia's family while Guo Jing pretends to be Ouyang Ke who wants to kidnap Cheng Yaojia.
28	9	"Episode 9"	Johnnie To 杜琪峯	Johnnie To 杜琪峯	April 28, 1983
Lu Chengfeng finally agrees to the marriage of Lu Guanying and Cheng Yaojia. Qiu Chuji and Sun Bu'er arrive to prevent their wedding but Cheng Yaojia falls into a valley. She is saved by Huang Yaoshi who then marries both of them. However, he still doesn't agree to Huang Rong marrying Guo Jing. He takes her to Peach Blossom Island by force.
29	10	"Episode 10"	Johnnie To 杜琪峯	Johnnie To 杜琪峯	April 29, 1983
Guo Jing arrives at Peach Blossom Island and becomes sworn brothers with Zhou Botong. Ouyang Feng comes to ask Huang Rong's hand in marriage with his nephew, Ouyang Ke. Hong Qigong also comes to lend his support to Guo Jing.
30	11	"Episode 11"	Yu Hoi-Wing 余凱榮	Yu Hoi-Wing 余凱榮	May 2, 1983
After defeating Ouyang Ke in three tests, Guo Jing gets Huang Yaoshi's approval as son-in-law. However, Ouyang Feng still wants the Jiuyin manual and plans to kidnap Guo Jing to recite its contents to him.
31	12	"Episode 12"	Yu Hoi-Wing 余凱榮	Yu Hoi-Wing 余凱榮	May 3, 1983
Zhou Botong reveals that Guo Jing won the competition because he has memorized the Jiuyin manual. Huang Yaoshi is furious and kicks Guo Jing out of Peach Blossom Island.
32	13	"Episode 13"	Siu Hin‑fai 蕭顯輝	Siu Hin‑fai 蕭顯輝	May 4, 1983
Ouyang Feng forces Guo Jing to write the Jiuyin manual, but Guo Jing gives him a fake version. After Ouyang Feng burns the boat they're in, Hong Qigong is stranded on an island with Ouyang Ke. They also find Huang Rong unconscious.
33	14	"Episode 14"	Siu Hin‑fai 蕭顯輝	Siu Hin‑fai 蕭顯輝	May 5, 1983
Thinking he won't live much longer, Hong Qigong passes Beggar Sect leadership to Huang Rong. Huang Rong traps Ouyang Ke under a boulder. After Ouyang Feng threatens to kill Hong Qigong, Huang Rong agrees to help free Ouyang Ke. Ouyang Feng then joins forces with Yang Kang and they try to kill Hong Qigong with a cannon.
34	15	"Episode 15"	Lau Si‑yuk 劉仕裕	Lau Si‑yuk 劉仕裕	May 6, 1983
Zhou Botong foils Yang Kang's plan. Meanwhile, Mu Nianci meets Mei Chaofeng and tells her about her relationship with Yang Kang. As Yang Kang's teacher, Mei Chaofeng then forces him to marry Mu Nianci.
35	16	"Episode 16"	Lau Si‑yuk 劉仕裕	Lau Si‑yuk 劉仕裕	May 9, 1983
While searching for Hong Qigong and Zhou Botong, Guo Jing and Huang Rong overheard a conversation about Qiu Qianren. Qiu Qianren says that he can tell them where Hong Qigong is, provided Guo Jing teaches him 18 Dragon Subduing Palms.
36	17	"Episode 17"	Ng Yat‑fan 吳一帆	Ng Yat‑fan 吳一帆	May 10, 1983
Guo Jing and Huang Rong reveals Qiu Qianren to be a phony. They find Hong Qigong and Zhou Botong, and also bump into Shagu, the mentally handicapped daughter of one of Huang Yaoshi's former disciples.
37	18	"Episode 18"	Ng Yat‑fan 吳一帆	Ng Yat‑fan 吳一帆	May 11, 1983
While stealing food in the Song palace, Guo Jing accidentally meets Yang Kang and Ouyang Feng. Guo Jing is injured by Ouyang Feng and Huang Rong tries to treat him back to health in a secret room.
38	19	"Episode 19"	Yu Hoi-Wing 余凱榮	Yu Hoi-Wing 余凱榮	May 12, 1983
Yang Kang stabs Ouyang Ke to death for trying to seduce Mu Nianci. Yang Kang also runs into Qiu Chuji and tells him that Guo Jing is dead.
39	20	"Episode 20"	Yu Hoi-Wing 余凱榮	Yu Hoi-Wing 余凱榮	May 13, 1983
Yang Kang steals the Dog Beating Stick. Mei Chaofeng is killed by Ouyang Feng. Huang Yaoshi gets into a skirmish with the Six Freaks, but Guo Jing prevents a bloodbath. Guo Jing and Huang Rong then go to the Beggar Sect headquarters to announce that she is now their new leader.

=== The Duel on Mount Hua (華山論劍) ===
No. overall	No. in season	Title	Directed by	Written by	Original release date
40	1	"Episode 1"	Siu Hin‑fai 蕭顯輝	Siu Hin‑fai 蕭顯輝	June 27, 1983
As the leader of Beggar Sect, Huang Rong demotes Elder Peng to Guardian for causing a schism between the Wuyi and Jingyi divisions. Feeling resentful, Elder Peng then joins Yang Kang and his cohorts to seek revenge.
41	2	"Episode 2"	Siu Hin‑fai 蕭顯輝	Siu Hin‑fai 蕭顯輝	June 28, 1983
Yang Kang claims to be the new Beggar Sect leader and he also has the Dog Beating Stick to prove it. Elder Peng tries to poison Guo Jing and Huang Rong but is arrested by them instead. They are invited by Qiu Chuji to stay at Quanzhen Sect while searching for Yang Kang. Qiu Qianren tells Yang Kang that his twin brother Qiu Qianzhang has been impersonating him.
42	3	"Episode 3"	Johnnie To 杜琪峯	Johnnie To 杜琪峯	June 29, 1983
Qiu Qianren and Yang Kang attack Quanzhen Sect but are defeated. While trying to retrieve the Dog Beating Stick, Guo Jing is arrested by Yang Kang and Qiu Qianren. Huang Rong rushes to save him.
43	4	"Episode 4"	Johnnie To 杜琪峯	Johnnie To 杜琪峯	June 30, 1983
With the help of Elder Lu, Huang Rong is recognized as the true leader of Beggar Sect. After being injured by Qiu Qianren, Huang Rong is taken by Guo Jing into Iron Palm Sect's secret chamber. Mu Nianci runs away from Yang Kang and seeks protection from Zhou Botong.
44	5	"Episode 5"	Johnnie To 杜琪峯	Johnnie To 杜琪峯	July 1, 1983
Guo Jing finds the Book of Wumu and also the way out of the secret chamber. To cure Huang Rong, Zhou Botong suggests that she and Guo Jing seek help from Reverend Yideng. On their way, they meet Yinggu, who gives them a drawing to be given to Reverend Yideng.
45	6	"Episode 6"	Johnnie To 杜琪峯	Johnnie To 杜琪峯	July 4, 1983
Guo Jing and Huang Rong defeat four of Yideng's disciples and arrives at his monastery. Yideng agrees to cure Huang Rong but this is all a ruse by Yinggu to weaken Yideng before she seeks revenge on him for not treating her baby many years ago.
46	7	"Episode 7"	Ng Yat‑fan 吳一帆	Ng Yat‑fan 吳一帆	July 5, 1983
Yideng tells the story about how Yinggu grew resentful of him. Yinggu used to be Emperor Yideng's concubine, but she had an affair with Zhou Botong. Their baby was injured badly by a mysterious man, but the Emperor refused to cure it.
47	8	"Episode 8"	Ng Yat‑fan 吳一帆	Ng Yat‑fan 吳一帆	July 6, 1983
Yinggu comes to kill Yideng but Guo Jing and Huang Rong convinces her not to do it. Instead, they promise to find Zhou Botong for her. After finding out that she's pregnant with Yang Kang's baby, Mu Nianci runs away from him.
48	9	"Episode 9"	Lau Si‑yuk 劉仕裕	Lau Si‑yuk 劉仕裕	July 7, 1983
After a confrontation with Qiu Qianren, Yinggu recognizes him as the person who killed her baby. Huang Yaoshi finally agrees to Guo Jing and Huang Rong's marriage.
49	10	"Episode 10"	No credits	No credits	July 8, 1983
Guo Jing finds Ke Zhen'e who is wearing mourning attire. He tells Guo Jing to go to Peach Blossom Island. Once there, Guo Jing and Huang Rong finds Guo Jing's other teachers dead and Huang Rong's mother's tomb in total disarray.
50	11	"Episode 11"	Siu Hin‑fai 蕭顯輝	Siu Hin‑fai 蕭顯輝	July 11, 1983
Huang Yaoshi fights with the Six Masters of Quanzhen at Yanyu Inn. Ouyang Feng and Yang Kang try to take advantage of this situation by poisoning them. Ke Zhen'e is injured by an arrow but is saved by Huang Rong.
51	12	"Episode 12"	No credits	No credits	July 12, 1983
Huang Rong and Ke Zhen'e hide in an old house. When Ouyang Feng and Yang Kang also arrive there, Huang Rong tricks them into admitting that they killed Guo Jing's teachers. She also makes Yang Kang admit that he killed Ouyang Ke. When Yang Kang tries to hit her, he gets Ouyang Feng's poison left on Huang Rong's clothes.
52	13	"Episode 13"	Yu Hoi-Wing 余凱榮	Yu Hoi-Wing 余凱榮	July 13, 1983
Huang Rong volunteers to follow Ouyang Feng in exchange of Ke Zhen'e. Yang Kang dies and is buried by Guo Jing and Mu Nianci. Meanwhile, Genghis Khan is victorious in his war against the Jins.
53	14	"Episode 14"	Yu Hoi-Wing 余凱榮	Yu Hoi-Wing 余凱榮	July 14, 1983
Guo Jing meets Genghis Khan again and follows him back to Mongolia. In Guo Jing's absence, Huazheng has been visiting his mother every day.
54	15	"Episode 15"	No credits	No credits	July 15, 1983
Elder Lu visits Guo Jing in Mongolia and helps him with military strategy. Unknown to Guo Jing, Huang Rong has been helping him through Elder Lu.
55	16	"Episode 16"	Lau Si‑yuk 劉仕裕	Lau Si‑yuk 劉仕裕	July 18, 1983
Guo Jing wagers with Ouyang Feng that if Ouyang Feng sneaks into his camp, he and his men can capture him alive and release him three times. Guo Jing wins the wager, and when Ouyang Feng escapes for the third time, he gives Huang Rong an idea for Genghis Khan to invade a Jin fortress.
56	17	"Episode 17"	Ng Yat‑fan 吳一帆	Ng Yat‑fan 吳一帆	July 19, 1983
Wanyan Honglie is captured by Genghis Khan and Guo Jing executes him. When Ouyang Feng pushes Huang Rong off a cliff, Guo Jing thinks she's dead.
57	18	"Episode 18"	No credits	No credits	July 20, 1983
Genghis Khan gives a secret command that as soon as they conquer the Jins, they will start invading Song dynasty as well. When Li Ping finds out, she tells Guo Jing that he has a responsibility to defend his country, then she commits suicide. Guo Jing runs away and is then reunited with Huang Rong.
58	19	"Episode 19"	Lau Si‑yuk 劉仕裕	Lau Si‑yuk 劉仕裕	July 21, 1983
Qiu Qianren finally realizes that he has committed many sins and rededicates his life to following Reverend Yideng. After practicing the Jiuyin Manual in reverse, Ouyang Feng becomes invincible but also crazy. Huazheng informs Guo Jing that her father is preparing for a southward invasion.
59	20	"Episode 20"	No credits	No credits	July 22, 1983
Guo Jing meets Mu Nianci and names her baby Yang Guo. After meeting the coward military officer that defends Xiangyang, Guo Jing decides to take over the task himself. He meets with Genghis Khan for the last time to tell him about the futility of war.
