= Flower boats =

Floating brothels historically found in southern China

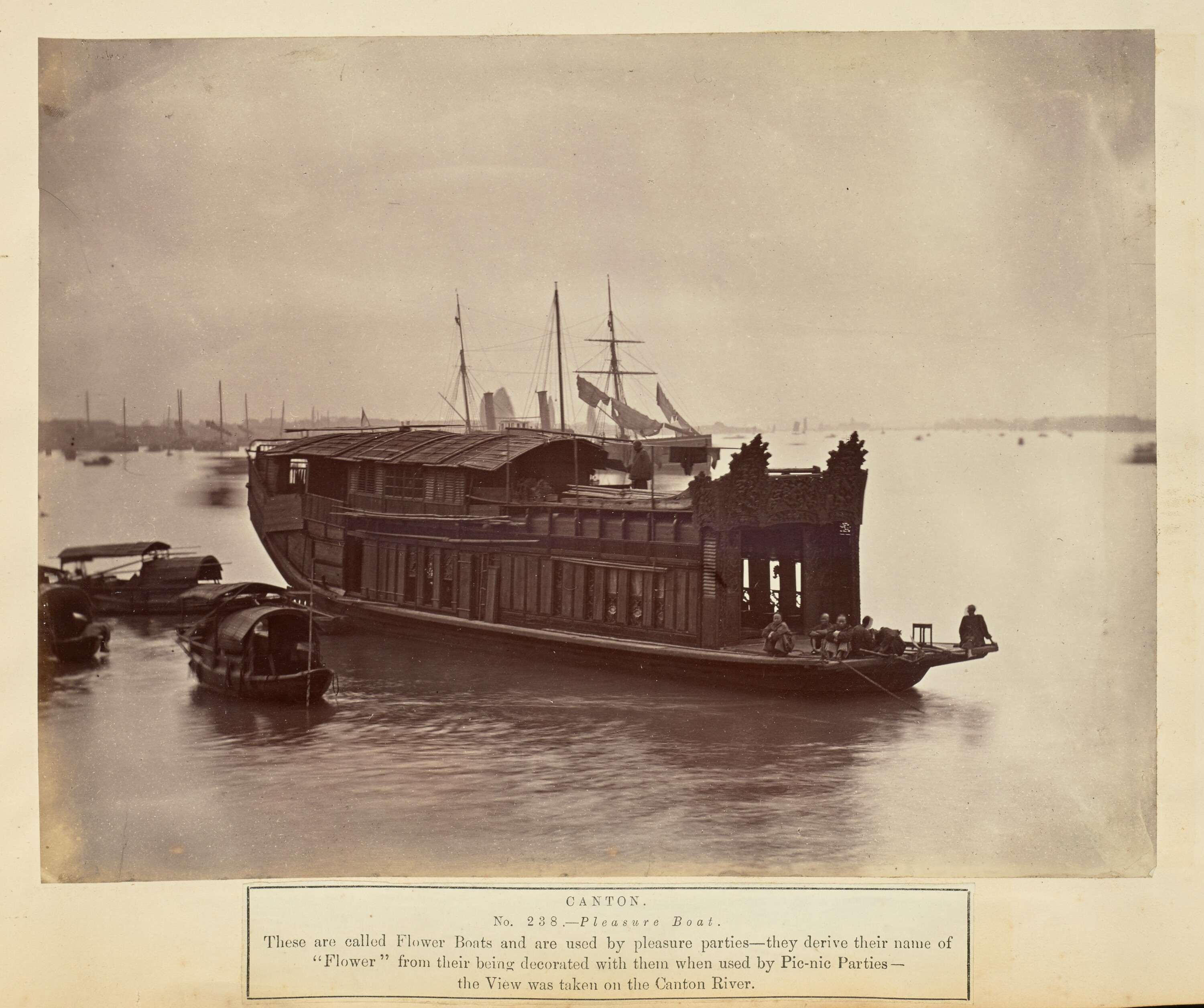
A Canton flower boat (a floating brothel) on the Pearl River, with men on deck and smaller boats alongside

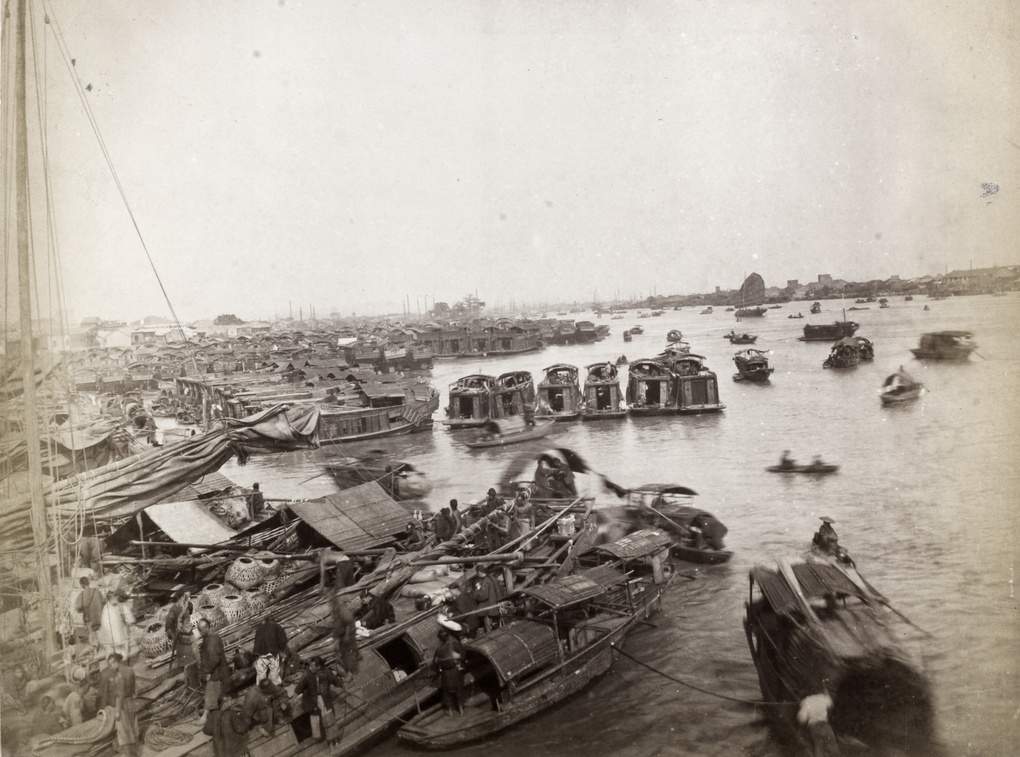
Rows of flower boats on the Pearl River

Flower boats (Chinese: 花船; pinyin: huāchuán) were floating brothels on the Pearl River. Foreigners were not allowed access to them.

Flower boats did not function solely as brothels. The term "flower boat" often referred to an ornate barge.
