= The Legend of the Condor Heroes (1983 TV series) =

1983 Hong Kong TV series

- DVD cover
- 射鵰英雄傳
- Genre: Wuxia
- Based on: The Legend of the Condor Heroes by Jin Yong
- Screenplay by: Chan Kiu-ying; Cheung Wah-biu
- Directed by: Johnnie To; Ng Yat-fan; Lau Si-yuk; Siu Hin-fai; Ching Siu-tung (action director)
- Starring: Felix Wong; Barbara Yung; Michael Miu; Sharon Yeung
- Theme music composer: Joseph Koo
- Opening theme: "Iron Blood and Loyal Heart" (鐵血丹心); "A Meaningful Life" (一生有意義); "You Are Ultimately the Best in this World" (世間始終你好); by Roman Tam and Jenny Tseng
- Country of origin: Hong Kong
- Original language: Cantonese
- No. of episodes: 59 (list of episodes)

Production
- Producer: Wong Tin-lam
- Production location: Hong Kong
- Running time: ≈42 minutes per episode
- Production company: TVB

Original release
- Network: TVB Jade
- Release: 21 February – 22 July 1983

Related
- The Return of the Condor Heroes (1983–84); The Legend of the Condor Heroes (2017)

The Legend of the Condor Heroes (射鵰英雄傳) is a Hong Kong wuxia television series adapted from the novel of the same title by Jin Yong. Comprising 59 episodes divided into three parts, the series was first broadcast on TVB Jade in Hong Kong in 1983, and subsequently re-aired in 1990, 1995–1996, 2012–2013, and 2024. The series became the highest rated series of that year with a high rating of 99%, averaging a rating of 65 points, and has become the most watched series in Hong Kong history so far.

In 1985, it was introduced and broadcast in mainland China by Guangdong TV Station, which triggered a frenzy of people watching it and caused a great sensation, The ratings in China reached 90%, making it one of the top ten highest-rated TV series in China in the 20th century. It was one of the most watched Hong Kong TV series outside China, and became the third highest rated Hong Kong TV series internationally.

This series marked Barbara Yung’s breakthrough, and to this day she is widely regarded as the definitive “Forever Rong’er,” an irreplaceable portrayal.

It was aired in India on the 1996 Home TV channel and gained huge popularity.

In 2022, the drama was selected as one of ten classic TVB dramas being honoured for a new joint Youku and TVB programme.

== Cast ==
- Felix Wong as Guo Jing
  - Fung Chi-fung as Guo Jing (child)
- Barbara Yung as Huang Rong
- Michael Miu as Yang Kang
- Sharon Yeung as Mu Nianci
- Patrick Tse as Yang Tiexin
- Louise Lee as Bao Xiruo
- Lau Kong as Wanyan Honglie
- Chu Tit-wo as Guo Xiaotian
- Soh Hang-suen as Li Ping
- Chun Wong as Zhou Botong
- Lau Dan as Hong Qigong
- Yeung Chak-lam as Ouyang Feng
- Kenneth Tsang as Huang Yaoshi
- Lau Siu Ming as Yideng
- Ha Yu as Qiu Chuji
- Kong Ngai as Ke Zhen'e
- Benz Hui as Zhu Cong
- Bobby Tsang as Han Baoju
- Tam Chuan-hing as Nan Xiren
- Eddy Ko as Quan Jinfa
- Ban Ban as Han Xiaoying
- Cheung Lui as Jebe
- Paul Chun as Genghis Khan
- Wong Jo-see as Huazheng
  - Lee Ka-wing as Huazheng (child)
- Andy Dai as Tolui
  - Lee Ka-ho as Tolui (child)
- Eddie Kwan as Chagatai
- Lin Wai-kin as Muqali
- Tam Bing-man as Jamukha
- Bonnie Wong as Mei Chaofeng
- Yeung Yim-tong as Chan Xuanfeng
- Stephan Yip as Wanyan Hongxi
- Wong Wan-choi as Ouyang Ke
- Chan Ka-yee as Feng Heng
- Chan On-ying as Shagu
- Shih Kien as Qiu Qianren
- Regina Tsang as Yinggu
- Rebecca Chan as Cheng Yaojia
- Kwan Hoi-san as Lu Chengfeng
- Austin Wai as Lu Guanying
- Bak Man-biu as Liang Ziweng
- Chan Tik-hak as Sha Tongtian
- Cheung Ying-choi as Ma Yu
- Rainbow Ching as Sun Bu'er
- Leung Siu-tik as Wang Chuyi
- Cheng Ka-sang as Hao Datong

== Soundtrack ==
The Legend of the Condor Heroes (射鵰英雄傳) is the soundtrack of this television series, released in 1983 by EMI Records. Roman Tam and Jenny Tseng sang the following songs, most which are heard in the series.

No.	Title	Cantonese	Length
1.	"Iron Blood and Loyal Heart"	鐵血丹心	5:07
2.	"The Whole River is Red" (Roman Tam)	滿江紅	4:38
3.	"Peach Blossoms"	桃花開	3:02
4.	"Willing to Undertake Love" (Jenny Tseng)	肯去承擔愛	3:35
5.	"Ballad of the Great Wall" (Roman Tam)	長城謠	2:58
6.	"Your Tender Smile" (Jenny Tseng)	你的淺笑	4:01
7.	"You're Ultimately the Best in this World"	世間始終你好	3:30
8.	"Sinful Love" (Jenny Tseng)	四張機	3:51
9.	"A Meaningful Life"	一生有意義	5:02
10.	"Remembering Our Romance Very Much" (Roman Tam)	千愁記舊情	4:43
11.	"It Seems that I Owe You in My Previous Life" (Jenny Tseng)	似是前生欠你	2:59
12.	"Do Our Best to Create a Bright Future" (Roman Tam)	美滿前途全力創	5:24

== Worldwide popularity ==
According to the "Top Ten TV Programs with the Most Viewed People in the World" announced by TVB in 1995, The Legend of the Condor Heroes was ranked third with a total worldwide audience of 356,163,000 people at that time.

== Production ==
Group photo of the main cast

According to the behind-the-scenes featurette on the DVD, the Mongolian scenes were filmed on Lantau Island, Hong Kong.

== Awards ==
This is the award this series has received.

Year	Award	Result
1983	New York International Film and Television Festival Gold Medal Award	Won
2009	Second place in CCTV's selection of "Ten Most Unforgettable Classic Dramas Post-80s"	Won
2019	National Top Ten TV Series in New Era International TV Festival	Won
2022	Top ten classic TVB dramas being honoured for a new joint Youku and TVB programme	Won
