= Lau Dan =

Hong Kong actor (born 1944)

Danny Lau Dan
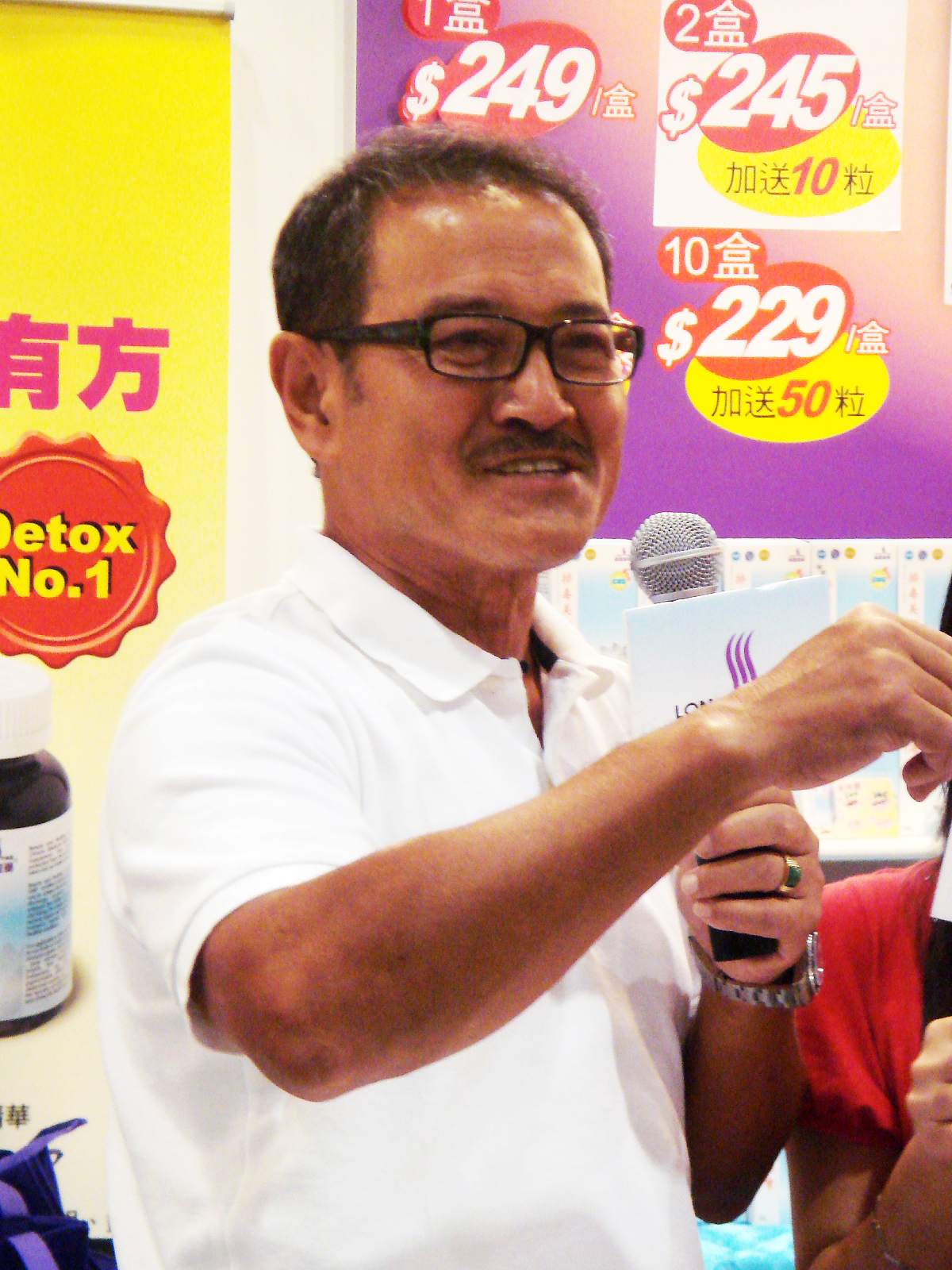
- Lau in 2008
- Born: Lau Hing-kei (劉慶基); 13 January 1944 (age 82); Weihai, Shandong, Republic of China
- Children: Hawick Lau (b. 1974)

Chinese name
- Traditional Chinese: 劉丹
- Simplified Chinese: 刘丹
Transcriptions
Standard Mandarin
- Hanyu Pinyin: Liú Dān
Yue: Cantonese
- Jyutping: Lau4 Daan1
- Musical career
- Also known as: Char Siu-bing (叉燒炳)

Danny Lau Dan (Chinese: 劉丹; born 13 January 1944) is a Hong Kong actor.

== Works ==
Lau is known to portray good characters, but could play cunning and sly characters with ease (includes The Bund and Land of Wealth). He is most noted for being the only actor to play the role of Hong Qigong in the TV series adaptations of Louis Cha's novels The Legend of the Condor Heroes and The Return of the Condor Heroes for four times in a row. Lau is also well known for playing the role of the patriarch of a family in A Kindred Spirit. He also appeared in the Latvian/Hong Kong film, Hong Kong Confidential (Amaya).

He was formerly an appointed member of Sai Kung District Council.

== Personal life ==
Lau's son, Hawick Lau, also formerly a TVB actor, was married to the famous mainland actress Yang Mi.

== Career ==
Lau Dan's career spans more than five decades, during which he has played numerous roles in TV dramas and films. He is perhaps best known for his role as "Hong Qigong" in the 1983 TVB adaptation of "The Legend of the Condor Heroes", based on the famous wuxia (martial arts) novel by Jin Yong. His portrayal of the humorous and righteous character earned him widespread recognition.

Another of his most famous roles is "Lau Dat Fa" in the long-running TVB sitcom "Come Home Love", where he played the family patriarch. This role endeared him to a younger generation of viewers, cementing his status as a beloved actor across multiple age groups.

== Filmography ==
- An Apple a Day (1970)
- The Water Margin (1972)
- The Romantic Swordsman (1978)
- Over the Rainbow (1979)
- The Bund (1980)
- Lonely Hunter (1981)
- The Restless Trio (1982)
- The Legend of the Condor Heroes (1982) & (1994)
- The Return of the Condor Heroes (1983) & (1995)
- The Smiling, Proud Wanderer (1984)
- The Duke of Mount Deer (1984)
- The New Adventures of Chor Lau-heung (1984)
- The Rough Ride (1985)
- New Heavenly Sword and Dragon Sabre (1986)
- The Return of Luk Siu Fung (1986)
- The Grand Canal (1987)
- My Father's Son (1988)
- Ghost is your wife (Vợ Là Ma) ATV series (1990)
- Silver Tycoon (1992)
- The Heaven Sword and Dragon Saber (1993)
- A Kindred Spirit (1995)
- Demi-Gods and Semi-Devils (1997)
- Journey to the West II (1998)
- The Heaven Sword and Dragon Saber (2000)
- Crimson Sabre (2000)
- The Stamp of Love (2001)
- Virtues of Harmony (2001)
- Where the Legend Begins (2002)
- Golden Faith (2002)
- Virtues of Harmony II (2003)
- Back to Square One (2003)
- Revolving Doors of Vengeance (2005)
- Food for Life (2005)
- Trimming Success (2006)
- War and Destiny (2006)
- Land of Wealth (2006)
- The Seventh Day (2008)
- Speech of Silence (2008)
- The Gem of Life (2008)
- Off Pedder (2009)
- Beyond the Realm of Conscience (2009)
- Cupid Stupid (2010)
- Ghost Writer (2010)
- Some Day (2010)
- Amaya (2010)
- Twilight Investigation (2010)
- Links to Temptation (2010)
- Only You (2011)
- The Other Truth (2011)
- Forensic Heroes III (2011)
- When Heaven Burns (2011)
- Let It Be Love (2012)
- Come Home Love (2012–2015)
- Sergeant Tabloid (2013)
- Noblesse Oblige (2014)
- Lost in Wrestling (2015)
- Law dis-Order (2016)
- Come Home Love: Lo and Behold (2017–present)
