= Johnny Yip =

- 葉振棠
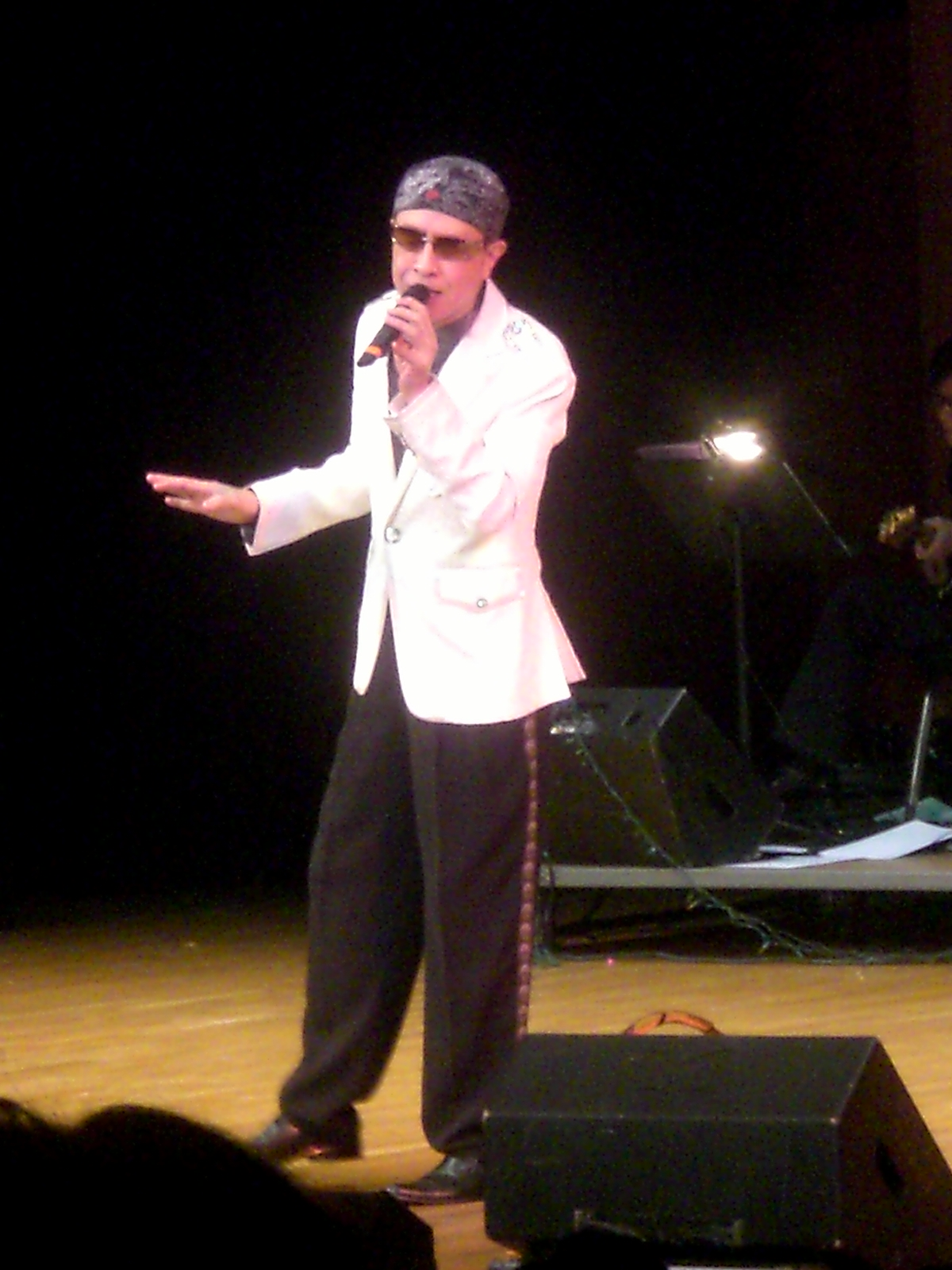
- Yip in 2009
- Born: 7 February 1944 (age 82); Portuguese Macau

Johnny Yip Chun-tong (Chinese: 葉振棠, born 7 February 1944), also known as Tong Gor (棠哥), is a Hong Kong singer who produced soundtracks for several Hong Kong television dramas in the 1980s.

== Early life ==
Yip was born in Macau in February 1944. His grandparents were of Vietnamese-Chinese heritage. At age 10, Yip contracted scarlet fever, which damaged his optic nerves and caused his eyesight to deteriorate. He attended the former Macau St. John's College Primary and Secondary School in China and switched to Pooi To Middle School when he was 13 to 14 years old.

== Career ==
=== Early years (1962–1980) ===
After graduating from secondary school at age 18, Yip travelled to Hong Kong in search of an office job. However, Hong Kong authorities did not acknowledge the academic qualifications he certified in Macau. With the introduction of an Indonesian-Chinese friend in Macau, he took to working as a part-time night bassist in the Tsim Sha Tsui bar "KK Club" and in a bar in Wan Chai. In the mid-1970s, Yip was approached by Chung Ting-yat to form a band named "The New Topnotes" with Chan Kit-ling and other musicians. He performed as the bass guitarist and lead vocalist of the band for 4 years. He has released five albums in English through EMI Records and was twice selected for the Top Ten Singers Golden Camel Award jointly organized by Overseas Chinese Evening News and the National Paint Factory. Yip decided to leave the band and return to Hong Kong for development, and "The New Topnotes" was disbanded. Yip later performed at Furama Hotel and formed a band called "Ma Cheng Tong" with former Ming band drummer Wu Mali and independent keyboardist Huang Zhengguang, with which Yip sang popular Cantonese songs. The band separated soon after. During this period, he worked in Singapore for half a year.

=== Rise to fame (1980–) ===
In 1980, Yip Chun-tong was hired by Michael Lai Siu-tin, the then music director of Rediffusion Television. With the help of Lai Siu-tin, Yip Chun-tong signed an exclusive TV drama singing contract with Rediffusion Television, where he recorded his first two TV drama songs, "Gone With the Wind" and "Drama Life". Yip Chun-tong was then assigned to sing five more theme songs for original TV dramas produced by Rediffusion Television. All of the theme songs were composed by Lai Siu-tin, with lyrics written by the then Rediffusion Publicity Director Lo Kwok-jim and an arrangement by Filipino arranger Eugenio "Nonoy" Ocampo. These TV series and their theme songs included "Gone With the Wind", "The Heroes of the Palace", "Tai Chi Master", "Hong Kong Gentlemen (I)", "The Ranger Zhang Sanfeng" and "The Legendary Fok". In addition, Yip Chun-tong also sang some of the interludes of these TV series, including "Drama Life" from "Gone With the Wind" and "No Excuse" from "Hong Kong Gentlemen (I)", and released several personal albums through EMI Records. Since the record company only wanted Yip to focus on his singing career, Ye resigned from his position as a resident singer at the Furama Hotel, where he had worked for two years.

In 1982, Yip Chun-tong left Rediffusion Television and signed a singing contract with TVB.

After joining TVB, Yip Chun-tong often collaborated with the station's then music director Joseph Koo, singing TV drama songs composed by Koo, including "The Troupe Boy" (戲班小子), "It's Hard to Determine the Boundary Between Good and Evil" (難為正邪定分界, duet with Mak Chi-shing), "Forget All the Love in My Heart" (忘尽心中情), "I Wish to Live Alone All My Life" (我願一生孤獨過), "When I'm Gone" (當我人去後), and "The Smiling, Proud Wanderer" (笑傲江湖; duet with Frances Yip).

"I like Yip Chun Tong's voice, it's more Chinese and it goes well with the melodies I write. Because he knows how to play the bass guitar and has worked in bands, he has a quick grasp of my musical requirements, so he is very good at it."

— Review by Joseph Koo

In addition to TV series songs, Yip's albums "Waiting Again" (再等待; 1982) and "This Leaf is for You" (這片葉給你; 1983) both used non-film and television songs as the theme. In 1983, "Yip Chun-tong Love Songs" did not include any film and television songs. "Flute Girl", "Wait Again" and "Moon God" topped the Chinese Songs Dragon and Tiger Chart weekly chart. The song "Moon God" used an electronic arrangement, and commentators pointed out that the song may have been influenced by the New Age Music composer Kitaro.

In 1982, Yip Chun-tong represented TVB in Tokyo, Japan in the 11th Tokyo Music Festival, with "Waiting Again" as his entry song. He won the Asia Special Award.
