= Stephen Tung =

Hong Kong action choreographer, actor and film director (born 1954)

- 董瑋
- Born: Tung Wai; 2 February 1954 (age 72); Shanghai, China
- Occupations: Action choreographer; Actor; Director
- Years active: 1970–present
- Children: 1

Stephen Tung Wai (Chinese: 董瑋; born 2 February 1954) is a Hong Kong action choreographer, actor, and film director. Tung began his career as a stuntman at the age of sixteen and transitioned into action choreography in the 1970s. He has collaborated extensively with directors John Woo, Tsui Hark, and Wong Kar-wai, contributing to films such as A Better Tomorrow (1986) and Hard Boiled (1992) (directed by Woo), The Blade (1995) and The Battle at Lake Changjin (2021) (directed by Tsui), and As Tears Go By (1988) and 2046 (2004) (directed by Wong). He won the Hong Kong Film Award for Best Action Choreography seven times with Downtown Torpedos (1997), Purple Storm (1999), The Accidental Spy (2001), Seven Swords (2005), Bodyguards and Assassins (2009), Kung Fu Jungle (2014), Operation Mekong (2016), and Bursting Point (2023), making him the most awarded individual in this category.

In addition to action choreography, Tung has also taken on acting and directing roles. He directed the horror film Magic Cop (1990) and the action film Hitman (1998), and is best known for his leading roles as Fong Sai-yuk and Lam Ping-chi in the martial arts series The Young Heroes of Shaolin (1981) and The Smiling, Proud Wanderer (1984) respectively.

== Early life ==
Tung was born on 2 February 1954 (Note: In an interview with Jet Magazine, Tung confirmed that his actual birth year is 1958, though official records listed it as 1954. This discrepancy arose because he moved to Hong Kong at the age of four and only learnt his true birth date when he returned to his homeland in his thirties after the reform and opening up.) in Shanghai, China. He was smuggled to Hong Kong with his grandmother at the age of four. Due to their family's financial situation, his grandfather sent him to learn wing chun and practice Cantonese opera with actress Fen Juhua, instead of going to school. Tung was only enrolled in primary school at the age of eleven, upon his aunt's request, but his grandfather withdrew him after the third year to support their livelihood. Tung starred in the war film Squadron 77 as a child actor in 1965 and began working as a stunt double when he was sixteen.

== Career ==
=== Early ventures (1970-1992) ===
Tung followed actor and action choreographer Han Ying-chieh to Taiwan to pursue a career in action choreography in the 1970s. He dedicated several years to researching action choreography, drawing inspirations from Hong Kong and Japanese action films. He became a stunt coordinator in 1974, making his debut with the action film Golden Mask Killer. Tung returned to Hong Kong in 1981 and joined TVB as a contracted actor. He starred as Ding Siu-bak, alongside Adam Cheng and Angie Chiu, in the drama series The Hawk, and as martial artist Fong Sai-yuk in the martial arts series The Young Heroes of Shaolin, in the same year. His performance impressed producers Yau Ka Hung and Lee Ting-leun, and was offered a lead role in the drama series The Restless Trio and portrayed Lam Ping-chi in the martial arts series The Smiling, Proud Wanderer.

In 1986, Tung served as the action choreographer for John Woo's A Better Tomorrow and Tsui Hark's Peking Opera Blues. Tung maintained good relations with Woo, and the duo collaborated closely in the future, but Tung and Tsui had a falling out and dropped out of the project midway. Tung continued to work as a choreographer in the horror comedy film Mr. Vampire III and action film Magnificent Warriors the following year. In 1988, Tung participated in Wong Kar-wai's crime drama film As Tears Go By. Tung acknowledged Wong's creativity and boldness in producing action scenes, and the duo continued a close collaboration as well. In 1989, Tung choreographed Lam Ching-ying's horror film Vampire vs. Vampire and the horror comedy film Vampire Buster. In return for Tung's involvement, Lam starred in Tung's directorial debut, the horror comedy film Magic Cop later in 1990. Tung admitted that he did not enjoy directing as he struggled with interpersonal relationships and chose to remain focused on action choreography. Tung also returned to collaborate with Wong Kar-wai in the drama film Days of Being Wild in 1990 and with John Woo in the action thriller film Hard Boiled in 1992.

=== Rise and critical recognition (1994-2002) ===
In 1994, Tung choreographed and executive produced the drama film The True Hero, for which he received a nomination for Best Action Choreography in the 31st Golden Horse Awards. In 1995, Tung served as the action choreographer for Tsui Hark's martial arts film The Blade. Despite their falling out while filming Peking Opera Blues, the two reunited through the Hong Kong Film Directors' Guild and developed a better understanding of each other after communicating. Tung joined The Blade only in the last two weeks of filming, when Tsui thought of asking Tung to help out in the final stages. The film earned Tung a nomination for Best Action Choreography in the 15th Hong Kong Film Awards. In the same year, Tung directed the action film Fox Hunter and choreographed the crime drama film Shanghai Grand, for which the latter received a nomination in the 16th Hong Kong Film Awards.

In 1997, Tung choreographed Teddy Chan's action film Downtown Torpedoes, which earned Tung his first award for Best Action Choreography in the 17th Hong Kong Film Awards. The film also marked the beginning of Tung's collaborations with Chan. In 1998, Tung directed and choreographed the action film Hitman, which received a nomination for Best Action Choreography in the 18th Hong Kong Film Awards. Tung also received a nomination for the thriller film Hot War in the same year in the 18th Hong Kong Film Awards. In 1999, Tung served as the action choreographer for Teddy Chan's action film Purple Storm, for which he won Best Action Choreography in both the 36th Golden Horse Awards and the 19th Hong Kong Film Awards. Tung won Best Action Choreography in the 21st Hong Kong Film Awards again for the 2001 action film The Accidental Spy. Tung also directed the action film Extreme Challenge in 2001. In 2002, he took up the role as action choreographer in the drama film Princess D and wuxia film Heroic Duo, which received nominations in the 22nd and 23rd Hong Kong Film Awards respectively.

=== Cross-border careers (2003-present) ===
In 2003, Tung went to Hollywood and choreographed the American action comedy film Bulletproof Monk, directed by Paul Hunter. However, he found the Western filming environment to be too industrialized and lacking in creative freedom, and he preferred working within Hong Kong action cinema. He collaborated with Wong Kar-wai once again in the 2004 romantic drama film 2046. In 2005, Tung assumed the role of action choreographer in Tsui Hark's Chinese-Hong Kong wuxia film Seven Swords. He joined Seven Swords in the final month of filming, describing his involvement in the project as "trouble-shooting". Tung won Best Action Choreography in the 42nd Golden Horse Awards and received a nomination in the 25th Hong Kong Film Awards for his work on the film. He also substituted Dion Lam and joined Chen Kaige's Chinese epic fantasy film The Promise during the production period. The following year, Tung participated in the war film A Battle of Wits and received a nomination in the 26th Hong Kong Film Awards for his choreography. Tung continued to choreograph the Chinese fantasy film Painted Skin, which garnered a nomination in the 28th Hong Kong Film Awards, and was involved in the Hong Kong action thriller film Beast Stalker in 2008. Tung collaborated with Teddy Chan once again in the 2009 historical action film Bodyguards and Assassins, for which Tung won in the 29th Hong Kong Film Awards and received a nomination in the 47th Golden Horse Awards. Tung continued to choreograph the 2009 Chinese historical film Empire of Silver and the 2010 Chinese wuxia film Reign of Assassins, the latter earning him a nomination in the 30th Hong Kong Film Awards. In 2014, Tung choreographed Teddy Chan's Chinese-Hong Kong action thriller film Kung Fu Jungle, for which he won Best Action Choreography in the 34th Hong Kong Film Awards and received a nomination in the 51st Golden Horse Awards. He also received a nomination for his work in the Chinese wuxia film The White Haired Witch of Lunar Kingdom in the Hong Kong Film Awards in the same year. Tung proceeded to participate in the 2015 Chinese-Hong Kong war film A Tale of Three Cities and the 2016 Chinese-Hong Kong action thriller film Operation Mekong, with the latter winning in the 36th Hong Kong Film Awards.

In 2017, Tung landed a lead role as Cheung Fuk-wai, the alcoholic father of Ng Siu-hin's character who divorced his wife, in the drama film In Your Dreams, which was a project of Hong Kong's First Feature Film Initiative. He also continued to choreograph in the Chinese-Hong Kong war film Our Time Will Come in 2017 and the Chinese action film The Rookies in 2019. He earned a nomination for Best Action Choreography in the 39th Hong Kong Film Awards with the Chinese fantasy film Double World. He collaborated with Tsui Hark once again in the Chinese war film The Battle at Lake Changjin in 2021 and returned in the sequel The Battle at Lake Changjin II in 2022, with the latter receiving a nomination in the 41st Hong Kong Film Awards. Tung won Best Action Choreography once again in the 42nd Hong Kong Film Awards with the action drama film Bursting Point, marking his seventh win and tying with the Jackie Chan Stunt Team as the most awarded recipients in the category. Tung returned to acting once again and starred in a lead role as Sam Lee, a washed-up action director pursuing a comeback, in the 2024 action film Stuntman, another project of the First Feature Film Initiative.

== Personal life ==
Tung is married and has a son.

Tung served as the head of the Hong Kong Stuntmen Association. He invited Japanese action choreographer Kenji Tanigaki, who was working as a cast extra, to join the Association and enter the stunt industry in 1994. He also discovered British actor Scott Adkins and cast him in the 2001 action film Extreme Challenge, which marked the beginning of his acting career.

== Filmography ==
=== As director ===
Year	Title	Notes
1990	Magic Cop	
1995	Fox Hunter	
1998	Hitman	Also as action choreographer
2001	Extreme Challenge	

=== As action choreographer ===
Year	Title	Notes
1986	A Better Tomorrow	
1986	Peking Opera Blues	Uncredited
1987	Mr. Vampire III	
1987	Magnificent Warriors	
1988	As Tears Go By	
1989	Vampire vs Vampire	
1989	Vampire Buster	
1990	Days of Being Wild	
1992	Hard Boiled	
1994	The True Hero	Also as executive producer
1995	The Blade	
1996	Shanghai Grand	
1997	Downtown Torpedoes	
1998	Hot War	
1999	Purple Storm	
2001	The Accidental Spy	
2002	Princess D	
2002	Hero	
2003	Bulletproof Monk	
2003	Heroic Duo	
2004	2046	
2005	Seven Swords	
2005	The Promise	
2006	A Battle of Wits	
2008	Painted Skin	
2008	Beast Stalker	
2009	Bodyguards and Assassins	
2009	Empire of Silver	
2010	Reign of Assassins	
2011	The Great Magician	
2013	Saving General Yang	
2014	Kung Fu Jungle	
2014	The White Haired Witch of Lunar Kingdom	
2015	A Tale of Three Cities	
2016	Operation Mekong	
2017	Our Time Will Come	
2019	The Invincible Dragon	
2019	The Rookies	
2020	Double World	
2021	The Battle at Lake Changjin	
2022	The Battle at Lake Changjin II	
2023	Bursting Point	

=== Acting credits ===
Year	Title	Role	Notes
1973	Enter the Dragon	Teenager	
1979	The Incredible Kung Fu Master	Ching (功夫精)	
1981	The Hawk	Ding Siu-bak (丁少白)	
1981	The Young Heroes of Shaolin	Fong Sai-yuk	
1982	The Restless Trio	Wong Siu-po (汪小寶)	
1984	The Smiling, Proud Wanderer	Lam Ping-chi	
2017	In Your Dreams	Cheung Fuk-wai (張福偉)	
2024	Stuntman	Sam Lee (李森)	
2026	Night King	Boss Fun (執碼芬)	

== Awards and nominations ==
Year	Award	Category	Work	Result	Ref.
1994	31st Golden Horse Awards	Best Action Choreography	The True Hero	Nominated	
1996	15th Hong Kong Film Awards	Best Action Choreography	The Blade	Nominated	
1997	16th Hong Kong Film Awards	Best Action Choreography	Shanghai Grand	Nominated	
1998	17th Hong Kong Film Awards	Best Action Choreography	Downtown Torpedoes	Won	
1999	18th Hong Kong Film Awards	Best Action Choreography	Hitman	Nominated	
1999	18th Hong Kong Film Awards	Best Action Choreography	Hot War	Nominated	
1999	36th Golden Horse Awards	Best Action Choreography	Purple Storm	Won	
2000	19th Hong Kong Film Awards	Best Action Choreography	Purple Storm	Won	
2002	21st Hong Kong Film Awards	Best Action Choreography	The Accidental Spy	Won	
2003	22nd Hong Kong Film Awards	Best Action Choreography	Princess D	Nominated	
2004	23rd Hong Kong Film Awards	Best Action Choreography	Heroic Duo	Nominated	
2005	42nd Golden Horse Awards	Best Action Choreography	Seven Swords	Won	
2006	25th Hong Kong Film Awards	Best Action Choreography	Seven Swords	Nominated	
2007	26th Hong Kong Film Awards	Best Action Choreography	A Battle of Wits	Nominated	
2009	46th Golden Horse Awards	Best Action Choreography	Beast Stalker	Nominated	
2009	28th Hong Kong Film Awards	Best Action Choreography	Painted Skin	Nominated	
2010	47th Golden Horse Awards	Best Action Choreography	Bodyguards and Assassins	Nominated	
2010	29th Hong Kong Film Awards	Best Action Choreography	Bodyguards and Assassins	Won	
2011	30th Hong Kong Film Awards	Best Action Choreography	Reign of Assassins	Nominated	
2014	51st Golden Horse Awards	Best Action Choreography	Kung Fu Jungle	Nominated	
2015	34th Hong Kong Film Awards	Best Action Choreography	Kung Fu Jungle	Won	
2015	34th Hong Kong Film Awards	Best Action Choreography	The White Haired Witch of Lunar Kingdom	Nominated	
2017	36th Hong Kong Film Awards	Best Action Choreography	Operation Mekong	Won	
2020	39th Hong Kong Film Awards	Best Action Choreography	Double World	Nominated	
2023	41st Hong Kong Film Awards	Best Action Choreography	The Battle at Lake Changjin II	Nominated	
2024	42nd Hong Kong Film Awards	Best Action Choreography	Bursting Point	Won	
