= Austin Wai =

Hong Kong actor

- 惠天賜
- Born: Wai Ti-chi; August 13, 1957; Shandong, China
- Died: October 4, 2012 (aged 55); Beijing, China
- Burial place: Fat Jong Temple, Tsz Wan Shan, Kowloon, Hong Kong
- Occupations: Actor; choreographer
- Years active: 1970–2012
- Spouses: Chan Bui-tai (m. 1980; div. 1991) Ban Ban (m. 1996; div. 2001)
- Children: 3
- Family: Kara Wai (sister)

Chinese name
- Traditional Chinese: 惠天賜
- Simplified Chinese: 惠天赐
Transcriptions
Standard Mandarin
- Hanyu Pinyin: Huì Tiāncì

Austin Wai Tin-chi (13 August 1957 – 4 October 2012) was a Hong Kong actor and choreographer. He was the elder brother of actress Kara Wai. He had notable roles in the martial arts films like The 36th Chamber of Shaolin, 5 Superfighters, The Avenging Eagle and Flash Point.

== Filmography ==
=== Film ===
- Pi li quan (1972) - Young Tien Wa
- Si da men pai (1977)
- Yin yang xie di zi (1977)
- Huang fei hong si da di zi (1977)
- Gong fu xiao zi (1977)
- The 36th Chamber of Shaolin (1978) - Shaolin disciple
- Nan yang tang ren jie (1978)
- Shi zi mo hou shou (1978)
- The Avenging Eagle (1978) - Cao Gao-shing
- Qian Long xia Yangzhou (1978)
- Yi tian tu long ji da jie ju (1978) - Wind Messenger
- Xing mu zi gu huo zhao (1979)
- Yuan yue wan dao (1979) - Knight
- Da chu tou (1979)
- The Deadly Breaking Sword (1979)
- Kung Fu Vs. Yoga (1979)
- Xin tie cuo men shen (1979)
- 5 Superfighters (1979) - Wang Fu-chung
- Qi sha (1979)
- Cha chi nan fei (1980) - Hsiao Tang
- Ying xiong wu lei (1980)
- Jin hu men (1980)
- Hong fen dong jiang hu (1981)
- Bong ju (1982) - Fu Chung-Yuan
- Demi-Gods and Semi-Devils (film) (1982) - Muk-yung Fuk
- Long teng hu yue (1983) - Ah Tung
- Zhi zhuan yi jian (1984) - Chin's 2nd challenger
- Zui hou yi zhan (1987) - Sum Ying-Mo
- Long zhi zheng ba (1989) - Chau Chi-Chung
- Zhuo gui da shi (1989) - Cheung's Ancestor
- Qian nu yun yu qing (1989)
- Zhuang zhi hao qing (1990)
- Fu gui bing tuan (1990) - Little Tortoise
- Hei dao huo hu li (1990)
- Demi-Gods and Semi-Devils (1990) - Qiao Feng
- Lie xue jie tou (1991)
- Cao mang ying ci (1992)
- Shen qiang shou yu Ka li ji (1992) - Wu Yuen-Shin
- Chi yu qing hua (1992)
- Shui hu zhuan zhi ying xiong ben se (1993) - Opposition Commander
- Yan yuk lap cheung (1993)
- The Secret File (1993)
- Da mo zu shi (1994) - Prince
- Bao yu jiao yang (1994) - Brother Four
- Mo yu zhui kong (1994) - Cheung Ming
- The Blade (1995) - Master of Sharp Manufacturers
- Sing yuet tung wa (1999) - Officer Ko
- Hak do fung wan ji sau chuk wong (1999)
- You sha cuo mao ai cuo (1999) - Au Fung
- Yi dai xiao xiong cao cao (1999)
- Sang sei kuen chuk (2000)
- Wong Gok hak yeh (2004) - Milo's Superior
- Kill Zone (2005) - Cheung Chun Fei
- Flash Point (2007) - Four Eyes
- Zang li zha (FIT) ren (2007)
- Rebellion (2009) - Mr. Tai
- Gong fu yong chun (2010) - (final film role)

=== Television dramas ===
- The Legend of the Condor Heroes (1983) - Luk Kwun-ying
- Lui Sei Leung (1985) - Bai Tai Guan
- Tian Long Ba Bu (1991) - Qiao Feng/Xiao Feng
