= Sharon Yeung Pan Pan =

Taiwanese actress and producer (born 1958)

Sharon Yeung
- 楊盼盼
- Born: 5 February 1958 (age 68); Taiwan
- Occupations: Actor; producer
- Years active: 1978–present

Sharon Yeung (born 5 February 1958) is a Taiwanese actress and film producer.

== Filmography ==
- The 14 Amazons (1972) - Stunts (Extra)
- Intimate Confessions of a Chinese Courtesan (1972) - Stunts (Extra)
- Rivals of Kung Fu (1974) - as Siao Fung
- The Magic Blade (1976) - as Hsia Bing
- Mr. Funny Bone (1976) - as Lady Exercising in the Park (Extra)
- Flying Guillotine, Part 2 (1978) - as Flying Guillotine Woman (Extra)
- Kung Fu Master Named Drunk Cat (1978) - as Chou Ling
- The Heaven Sword and Dragon Saber (1978)
- Choi Lee Fat Kung Fu (1979) - as Hung Yuk
- Two Wondrous Tigers (1979) - as Ming
- Duel of the 7 Tigers (1979) - as Ting's Daughter
- The Story of Drunken Master (1979) - as Gam Fa Yeung
- Lion Vs Lion (1979) - as Lady Red
- Return of the Deadly Blade (1981)
- Kid from Kwangtung (1982) - as Chen Xiaowei
- Interpol (1982) - Policewoman (Guest)
- The Legend of the Condor Heroes (1983)
- Ninja Evil Strike (1989)
- Angel Enforcers (1989)
- Princess Madam (1989)
- Erotic Passion (1992) - as Yuen Shang
- Angel Terminators (1992) - as Ada
- The Way of the Lady Boxers (1993) - as Superintendent Li Tong
- Deadly Target (1994) - as Inspector Anna Yeung Na
- Angel on Fire (1995) - as Wong Li
- Yes Madam 5 (1996)
- Trail (1999)
- Beach Spike (2011) - as Mrs. Toh
- Kung Fu Jungle (2014) - as Landlady (Guest)
- Amazing Spring (2019)
- Kungfu Stuntmen - Never Say No! (2020) - as Herself
