= Five Tiger Generals of TVB =

Group of five male actors

Five Tiger Generals
- Five Tiger Generals, 1983. Top (L-R): Lau, Wong; Bottom (L-R): Miu, Leung, Tong

Background information
- Also known as: Five Tigers
- Origin: Hong Kong
- Years active: 1980s
- Members: Michael Miu; Kent Tong; Felix Wong; Andy Lau; Tony Leung

Five Tiger Generals of TVB
- Traditional Chinese: 無綫五虎將
- Simplified Chinese: 无线五虎将
- Literal meaning: Wireless Five Tiger Generals
Transcriptions
Standard Mandarin
- Hanyu Pinyin: Wúxiàn Wǔ Hǔ Jiàng
Yue: Cantonese
- Jyutping: Mou4 Sin3 Ng5 Fu2 Zoeng3

The Five Tiger Generals of TVB (無綫五虎將), more commonly referred to as simply the Five Tigers (五虎), were a group of five of the most popular young leading male actors of 1980s Hong Kong television. The group consisted of Michael Miu ("Big Tiger"), Kent Tong ("Second Tiger"), Felix Wong ("Third Tiger"), Andy Lau ("Fourth Tiger"), and Tony Leung Chiu-wai ("Small Tiger"). The group was formed to collectively promote the popularity of the five members, as well as to promote the company's various drama and entertainment productions. Five Tiger Generals was a name given to them by the media. The term is a popular appellation in Chinese culture, meaning a ruler's five best military generals.

== Background ==
While all 5 members were once trainees of TVB's then all-year Artiste Training Academy, they joined the school at different times—Kent Tong joined in 1978, Michael Miu and Felix Wong in 1979, Andy Lau in 1980, and Tony Leung in 1981. Tong was the first to debut with his first role as the supporting character Wu Wang-yuen in the 1980 drama This Land is Mine. Wong's first role was in the 1981 The Misadventure of Zoo. The other 3 members had debut roles while still trainees at the school: Miu's debut role was the 1980 drama The Adventurer's, Lau's first role was in the sitcom Hong Kong '81, and Leung had his first major role in the 1982 Soldier of Fortune, which also starred Wong and Tong.

It did not take long for the Five Tigers to become popular. According to Wong during a 2009 interview for the talk show Be My Guest, TVB's first generation of leading actors at the time, which included Adam Cheng and Chow Yun-fat, were leaving the company, and TVB was in need of rounding up a new generation of popular idols; thus, the members of the Five Tigers quickly rose to fame due to many performing opportunities. Wong said that as soon as he graduated from acting school, he was offered a major supporting role. Wong was then offered a leading role in his second drama, The Lonely Hunter (1981), which shot him to instant fame in Hong Kong.

=== Formation ===
In September 1983, amidst a ratings competition with Korean and Japanese variety shows, TVB created the show All Star Challenge, which featured almost an entire lineup of the most popular actors and singers of Hong Kong at the time. The five most popular young male idols at the station—Miu, Tong, Wong, Lau, and Leung—were grouped together to perform a variety of stage performances at the show, such as singing and dancing. Their appearances brought in a lot of media attention, and their performances were a selling point for the show. The media then branded them as TVB's Five Tiger Generals, and the term quickly caught on to the public. Since their formation, the five of them consistently made public appearances together as a group; they even expressed that they would like to release an album together under their name. In 1991, the group starred in the action thriller The Tigers, a film adaptation of the 1984 television drama Rise and Fall of a Stand-In. It is the only film to star all five members.

== Legacy and reunion ==
The popularity of the Five Tigers led TVB to continue with similar group projects even after the members of the Five Tigers left TVB. However, none of them were that successful. Many television dramas that featured the members of the Five Tigers, notably The Legend of the Condor Heroes (1983), The Return of the Condor Heroes (1983), Police Cadet (1984), The Duke of Mount Deer (1984), and Looking Back in Anger (1989), were branded as classics by many in Asia.

On 27 June 2010, during a press conference for a training academy in Panyu, Guangzhou, Tong revealed that the five members are planning for another reunion project. The collaboration between Miu and Wong in the 2010 drama Gun Metal Grey created a heated discussion about a possible reunion of all members in the future. "The Five Tiger Generals will definitely reunite again. The five of us really hope for that day to come; in fact, we are currently planning one right now."

== Collaborations ==
Film
Year	Film	Miu	Tong	Wong	Lau	Leung	Notes
1982	Demi-Gods and Semi-Devils		☒	☒			
1982	Once Upon a Rainbow		☒		☒		
1983	Mad, Mad 83	☒		☒		☒	
1985	Twinkle, Twinkle Lucky Stars	☒			☒		
1986	Lucky Stars Go Places	☒			☒		
1987	Eastern Condors	☒	☒				
1988	The Dragon Family	☒	☒		☒		
1988	Lai Shi, China's Last Eunuch			☒	☒		
1988	The Crazy Companies II	☒			☒		
1989	Little Cop	☒			☒		
1989	City Cops	☒	☒				
1989	Proud and Confident	☒			☒		
1989	News Attack	☒			☒		
1990	The Fortune Code	☒			☒		
1990	Days of Being Wild				☒	☒	
1991	Don't Fool Me				☒	☒	
1991	The Tigers	☒	☒	☒	☒	☒	Nominated—Hong Kong Film Award for Best Supporting Actor (Tong)
1991	The Banquet				☒	☒	
1992	Handsome Siblings	☒			☒		
1992	The Days of Being Dumb		☒			☒	
1993	Hero - Beyond The Boundary Of Time		☒			☒	
1993	Lord of East China Sea	☒	☒				
1993	Lord of East China Sea II	☒	☒				
1993	Come Fly the Dragon	☒			☒	☒	
1994	Drunken Master II			☒	☒		
2002	Infernal Affairs				☒	☒	Hong Kong Film Award for Best Actor (Leung); Golden Horse Awards for Best Actor (Leung); Golden Bauhinia Awards for Best Actor (Leung); Hong Kong Film Award for Best Original Film Song (Lau with Leung); Nominated—Hong Kong Film Award for Best Actor (Lau); Nominated—Golden Horse Awards for Best Actor (Lau)
2002	Golden Chicken			☒	☒		
2003	Infernal Affairs III				☒	☒	Golden Horse Awards for Best Actor (Lau)
2003	Golden Chicken 2			☒	☒		
2004	Jiang Hu	☒			☒		
2004	Love Is a Many Stupid Thing	☒	☒				
2006	My Mother Is a Belly Dancer		☒		☒		
2005	Wait 'til You're Older			☒	☒		Nominated—Hong Kong Film Award for Best Actor (Lau)
2007	Brothers	☒	☒	☒	☒		Nominated—Hong Kong Film Award for Best Original Film Song (Lau with Eason Chan)
2011	I Love Hong Kong	☒		☒			
2013	7 Assassins	☒		☒			
2017	Shock Wave			☒	☒		Nominated—Hong Kong Film Award for Best Actor (Lau); Nominated—Hong Kong Film Award for Best Film (Lau)
2017	Chasing the Dragon		☒	☒	☒		Nominated—Hong Kong Film Award for Best Film (Lau)
2019	The White Storm 2: Drug Lords	☒			☒		
2023	The Goldfinger				☒	☒	
Television dramas
Year	Title	Miu	Tong	Wong	Lau	Leung	Notes
1981	The Adventurer's	☒	☒				
1981	Double Fantasies	☒	☒				
1981	Come Rain, Come Shine	☒	☒	☒			
1981	The Lonely Hunter	☒		☒			
1981	The Young Heroes of Shaolin	☒		☒	☒		
1982	A Kid Troupe	☒			☒		
1982	Demi-Gods and Semi-Devils		☒	☒			
1982	The Legend of Master So	☒			☒		
1982	The Wild Bunch		☒	☒			
1982	Soldier of Fortune		☒	☒		☒	
1982	The Emissary				☒	☒	
1983	The Legend of the Condor Heroes	☒		☒			
1983	The Return of the Condor Heroes		☒		☒		
1984	The Duke of Mount Deer				☒	☒	
1984	The Foundation	☒	☒	☒			
1984	Rise And Fall Of A Stand-in	☒	☒				
1984	The Return of Wong Fei Hung		☒		☒		
1984	Summer Kisses, Winter Tears	☒	☒				
1985	Sword Stained with Royal Blood	☒		☒			
1985	Tough Fight		☒	☒			
1985	The Yang's Saga	☒	☒	☒	☒	☒	
1987	The Grand Canal			☒		☒	
1987	Two Most Honorable Knights	☒				☒	
2010	Gun Metal Grey	☒		☒			Nominated—TVB Anniversary Award for Best Actor (Top 15) (Miu); Nominated—TVB Anniversary Award for Best Actor (Top 5) (Wong)

== See also ==
- 5 Tigers: Michael Miu, Kent Tong, Felix Wong, Andy Lau, Tony Leung Chiu-Wai
- 5 Beauties: Yammie Lam, Idy Chan, Margie Tsang, Jamie Chik, Kitty Lai
- 5 Fresh Tigers: Louis Koo, Leo Ku, Carlo Ng, Hawick Lau, Keith Ho
- 5 Fresh Beauties: Gigi Fu, Jojo Cho, Wallis Pang, Eileen Yeow, Joyce Chan
