= Brothers (2007 film) =

2007 Hong Kong film by Derek Chiu

- Theatrical poster
- Traditional Chinese: 兄弟
- Simplified Chinese: 兄弟
- Hanyu Pinyin: Xiōng Dì
- Jyutping: Hing1 Dai6
- Directed by: Derek Chiu
- Written by: Chan Kin-chung; Y.C. Kong
- Produced by: Andy Lau; Kent Cheng
- Starring: Michael Miu; Eason Chan; Andy Lau; Huang Yi; Felix Wong; Kent Tong; Gordon Lam; Teddy Lin; Wang Zhiwen
- Cinematography: Charlie Lam
- Edited by: Kwong Chi-leung
- Music by: Kubert Leung
- Production companies: Focus Films; MediaCorp Raintree Pictures; Polybona Films
- Distributed by: Polybona Films
- Release date: 18 October 2007
- Running time: 100 minutes
- Country: Hong Kong
- Languages: Cantonese; Mandarin; English; Thai

Brothers is a 2007 Hong Kong film. The story follows the relationship between two brothers (Michael Miu and Eason Chan) who are part of a Hong Kong triad. The film mostly takes place in Hong Kong and Bangkok, Thailand. Produced by Andy Lau's Focus Films, Brothers is directed by Derek Chiu and written by Chan Kin-chung and Y.C. Kong. The film was released in mainland China in the name of 兄弟之生死同盟 (pinyin: Xiōngdì zhī Shēngsǐ Tóngméng; lit. Brothers: Alliance of Life and Death).

Co starring leads include Andy Lau, Huang Yi, Felix Wong, Kent Tong and Teddy Lin. The film marks a 16-year reunion of four out of the Five Tiger Generals of TVB since The Tigers (1991), except for Tony Leung, who was unavailable as he was filming Lust, Caution (2007).

== Cast ==
=== Tam family ===
- Wang Zhiwen as Tam Shun-tin
- Elaine Jin as Tin's wife
- Michael Miu as Tam Chung-yiu, Tin's eldest son
- Eason Chan as Tam Chung-shun, Tin's youngest son
- Felix Wong as Ghostie
- Huang Yi as Chong Ching, Yiu's lawyer and girlfriend

=== Yim family ===
- Henry Fong as "Uncle Nine" Yim Sai-kau
- Kent Tong as Yim Kwok-kui, Uncle Nine's son
- Teddy Lin as Chacha

=== Police department ===
- Yu Rongguang as Superintendent Cheung Man-wah
- Andy Lau as Chief Inspector Lau Chun-fui
- Gordon Lam as Sergeant Lam Sun
- Jonathan Cheung and Chan Wing-chun as police officers

=== Other ===
- Lam Suet as Old Ghost, Ghostie's father
- Wong Ching as "Uncle Chow" Ho Jau
- Benny Li as Thunder
- Eddie Cheung as the fruit stall keeper
- Six-ching Szeto as Master

== Awards ==
=== 27th Hong Kong Film Awards ===
- Nominated: Best Original Film Song
  - "Brothers"
    - Written by Eason Chan
    - Lyrics by Andy Lau
    - Performed by Andy Lau and Eason Chan
