= Adrian Wong =

Adrian Wong may refer to:

- Adrian Wong (artist) (born 1980), American artist
- Adrian Wong (basketball) (born 1996), Filipino-American basketball player
- Adrian Wong Tsz-ching (born 1990), Hong Kong actress
