= Come Fly the Dragon =

1993 Hong Kong film by Eric Tsang

- Hong Kong VCD cover
- Traditional Chinese: 反斗馬騮
- Simplified Chinese: 反斗马骝
- Hanyu Pinyin: Fǎn Dòu Mǎ Liú
- Jyutping: Faan2 Dau2 Maa2 Lau1
- Directed by: Eric Tsang
- Screenplay by: Ng Hong-keung; Lau Tai-muk; Cheung Tat-ming; Yiu Hing-hong
- Produced by: Keung Leung-kam; Poon Cheung-chuen; Wallace Cheung
- Starring: Andy Lau; Tony Leung; Michael Miu; Shing Fui-On; Frankie Chan; Fennie Yuen
- Cinematography: Tom Lau; Ho Yung-ching
- Edited by: Wong Chau-kwai
- Music by: Richard Lo
- Production company: Movie Impact
- Distributed by: Newport Entertainment
- Release date: 15 April 1993
- Running time: 94 minutes
- Country: Hong Kong
- Language: Cantonese
- Box office: HK$6,878,943

Come Fly the Dragon is a 1993 Hong Kong action comedy film directed by Eric Tsang and starring Andy Lau and Tony Leung. Lau and Leung, alongside co-star Michael Miu, were three of the Five Tiger Generals of TVB in the 1980s.

== Plot ==
Taiwan's uprising gang leader Lee Yan-chak uses violence to wipe out Taiwan's competing forces and won Asia's largest arms smuggling market. Because the smuggling group is powerfully armed, the military decided to set up a special group, where the leader chooses fighting pilots Chow Chun-kit and Lau Ka-lun to be trained by Colonel Ng. Kit was sent undercover to investigate on Lee's evidence of crime. Subsequently, Lee's men notices Kit. Lee also notices Kit's hale personality and takes him under his wing. In a choice of his task and his personal relationship, Kit chose task as the main importance and assisted the Special Force in infiltrating the arms base, while Lee plays dead and escapes from the law.

== Cast ==
- Andy Lau as Chow Chun-kit
- Tony Leung Chiu-Wai as Lau Ka-lun
- Fennie Yuen as Lee Wai-kuen
- Michael Miu as Chiu
- Frankie Chan as Lee Yan-chak
- Shing Fui-On as Lee Yan-chak's henchman
- Norman Chui as Colonel Ng
- Ben Lam as Leung Wai-man
- Lee Chi-hei as Lee Kwok-man
- Chui Sing-yee as Sze Hon
- Choi Chung-chau
- Lam Kai-man
- Tsang Man-cheong
- Chan Yiu-wing
- Chu Kwan-yeung
- Lam Kwong-chun

== Theme song ==
- Happy Monkey (開心的馬騮)
  - Composer: Wong Cheuk-wing
  - Lyricist: Lin Xi
  - Singer: Andy Lau

== Box office ==
The film grossed HK$6,878,943 at the Hong Kong box office during its theatrical run from 15 to 29 April 1993 in Hong Kong.

== See also ==
- Andy Lau filmography
