= Guardian Angel (web series) =

Hong Kong TV series

- 守護神之保險調查
- Genre: Action; Insurance; Investigators
- Starring: Michael Miu, Bosco Wong, Annie Liu and Kate Tsui
- Opening theme: (世世 (粵語), 真相 (國語)) by A-Lin
- Ending theme: (守護人) by James Ng and (守護英雄) by Theway Zhang
- Country of origin: Hong Kong
- Original language: Chinese
- No. of episodes: 36 (Original Version)

Production
- Producer: Chung Shu-Kai
- Production locations: Hong Kong, China, Shenzhen, UK, Czech Republic, Prague, Slovakia, Malaysia
- Running time: 43 minutes
- Production companies: Shaw Brothers Studio, IQiyi

Original release
- Network: TVB Jade (Hong Kong), myTV Super (Hong Kong), Astro AOD (Malaysia), IQIYI (Mainland China/Taiwan), Fairchild TV (Canada)
- Release: December 24, 2018 – February 2, 2019

Guardian Angel (Chinese: 守護神之保險調查) is a 2018 Hong Kong insurance drama produced by Shaw Brothers Studio. It stars Michael Miu, Bosco Wong, Annie Liu and Kate Tsui as the main cast, with Benz Hui, Hugo Ng, Alex Lam, MC Jin, Mimi Kung as the major supporting cast.

== Synopsis ==
Northern Lights Insurance Company has a team of insurance investigators that is led by Fong Chi-keung (Benz Hui), who makes impromptu jokes, and includes wealthy heiress Dou Sum-yu (Annie Liu), Bak Tin-ming (Bosco Wong), and retired police officer Cheung Tung (Michael Miu). They each have their own talents and form a team in the insurance industry. They manage to investigate and uncover the truth in all the thorny, dangerous or strange cases that are passed to them. Although 9 out of 10 cases end up with the insurance company paying out money, their mission is to discover the truth. Fairness, impartiality and righteousness are their guiding principles. The three investigators are like special agents, conducting cross-border investigations, searching for clues, following targets and gathering evidence. At the same time, they unintentionally become involved in many people's stories and become their guardian angels.

== Cast ==
=== Main cast ===
Cast	Role	Description
Michael Miu	Cheung Tung (張東)	Former police officer (senior inspector), now a “junior” Insurance Investigator he suffers from claustrophobia of elevators after he killed Yip Chi's boyfriend at the time, Barbecue Pork. Friend of Chung Gor. Friend and subordinate of Fong Chi-keung, and Bak Tin-ming. Subordinate and uncle of Do Sum-yu. in episode 33, after encouragement from Yip Chi, he takes the elevator to overcome his claustrophobia to see her instead of going up the stairs like he always does. When he doesn't find Yip Chi in her office, he goes back down only to hear people say an accident happened near the parking area. He rushes there to find that Yip Chi has already died. He found out the murderer of Yip Chi was Vincent and went on the black market to buy a gun. Cheung Tung prepared to avenge for Yip Chi. In episode 34, he asked the underworld to find Vincent. He later received notice that someone was holding Vincent hostage and Cheung Tung made a deal to exchange Vincent for a USB which had very important information in it. On the way however, a white van crashed into the Taxi Cheung Tung was in and a person with a tattoo took away Cheung Tung's USB. Cheung Tung was in a coma for three days. In episode 35, he lynched the mysterious person who stole the USB by hanging him and pulling him down to almost near death until he successfully forced him to confess the stolen USB and where Vincent was. The stolen USB has been entrusted to the Northern Lights Insurance Company. Cheung Tung wanted to shoot Vincent dead but because Rachael came in time, he was unsuccessful. Later, he was arrested by the police and allowed bail. In episode 36, Vincent who killed Yip Chi didn't need to go to jail because he used his mental problems as an excuse to make him not criminally responsible. So Vincent was put in a mental hospital for one year as his charge for killing Yip Chi. Cheung Tung who also had some mental problems asked the doctor to let him stay in the same mental hospital as Vincent for observation. At the mental hospital, he held a knife at Vincent's neck and took the recording pen with the evidence of Vincent's corruption from his hand, and then asked Rachel to transfer the recording pen to Bak Tin-ming. In the end, Jin Shang-wen and Vincent were successfully convicted and Cheung Tung was released from the mental hospital.
Bosco Wong	Bak Tin-Ming (百天明)	“Senior” insurance investigator he is the boyfriend of actor Kay. His ex-girlfriend, Cici Baby is now Chung Gor's girlfriend. He likes magic. Chung Gor's friend Cheung Tung's boss and friend. Do Sum-yu's subordinate and friend. Later, she becomes his girlfriend but then they break up. In case 11, he tells Chan On-yee that Michael Miu (Michael Miu plays Cheung Tung in this drama) is his idol. In episode 36, he is Mark's friend and boxing master. In episode 29, he went to Prague with Do Sum-yu to find her boyfriend, Ken, who had been missing for many years. Chung Gor was mad at Cici Baby and when Cici Baby went down the stairs, she fell down and injured herself. Cici Baby used this injury to her advantage and claimed that she had paraplegia, forcing Chung Gor to take care of her but also making him investigate her. In episode 32, he was able to secretly record her using his hidden camera showing that she was faking paraplegia and threatened to send it to Chung Gor. In episode 36, after he confessed his illness to Chung Gor, he reunited/pursued Dou Sum-yu again. In epsoide 36, he asked Chung Gor to help him find out the truth about Ye Chi's murder. The cooperation with Jin Shang-wen enabled him to gain the trust; later, he used Yip Chi's recorder and company documents to indicate to Jin Shang Wen that there was sufficient evidence to convict the Jin Shang Wen, and finally persuaded Jin Shang Wen to surrender to the police station.
Annie Liu	Do Sam-yu (杜心茹)	“Supervisor” insurance investigator The daughter of Chung Gor; Rich Second Generation; Ken's girlfriend, looking for him for eight years, and then breaking up with him. Boss of Bak Tin-Ming and Cheung Tung. Good friend of Bak Tin-ming and later becomes his girlfriend. She breaks up with him in episode 36. Cheung Tung is her uncle. Does not like her dad's girlfriend Cici baby because she is younger than her. Mark likes her and in the end, she finally agrees to bike with him around the world. Is a fan of Mi Je which is also a person she had to investigate. She is mostly vegetarian due to her sensitive stomach. In episode 29, she and Bak Tin-ming went to Prague to find Ken, who had been missing for many years. Officially accepted Mark in episode 36 and travelled with him on a bike trip around the world.
Kate Tsui	Yip Chi (葉子)	Broker of the Northern Lights Insurance Company. Director of the Quifeng Laundry. fiancée of Barbecue Pork who died because of a police officer making her not like the police. She had a relationship with Cheung Tung. In episode 16, she opens a joint venture after coax from Ho Kwok Leung who has a crush on her. Because of this, Yip Chi borrows huge amounts of cash from financial companies. Ho Kwok Leung divorced his wife who has kids with because he wanted to get together with Yip Chi. Episode 19, she broke up with Cheung Tung because she went up to his office to ask why he put money in her account every month and he told her the truth of him being the cop that killed her fiancée. After that, she took some time off. In episode 20, her aunt used the elderly to apply for insurance under Yip Chi but was actually tricking them and framing Yip Chi. Cheung Tung tried to help her and found out the truth, bailing her out but she still didn't want to see him. She also sells her laundry shop In episode 28, she saved Chung Gor who fainted and fell into the pool. He then started drowning and Yip Chi saved him. After that, Song Gor starts to have a crush on her. In episode 33, she learned about the internal secrets of Northern Lights Insurance Company. Jin Shang Wen and Vincent demanded to join forces, and later apparently agreed to cooperate but the dialogue was secretly recorded by Yip Chi. Vincent found out that she was recording them and Vincent fought for the recording pen and pushed her off the building resulting in her death to get the recording pen.
Benz Hui	Fong Chi Keung (沈堅強)	Insurance Investigation team director, FIT bar owner. Friend of Chung Gor, Cheung Tung, Bak Tin-ming, Do Sum-yu. He had a relationship with Linda Wong Lin until Linda abandon him in front of his staff for not telling his real age. In episode 32, he was framed in creating fake document (forgery) and got arrested. In episode 33, Yip Chi went to the police station to clarify and help him.

=== Other main cast members ===
Cast	Role	Description
Kent Tong	Jin Shang-wen (金尚文)	Ultimate Villain in this drama. Northern Lights Insurance Company Chairman. Husband of Amy. The boss of Yip Chi. Promised Vincent to make him the boss, and cooperated with the other party to forge documents so that the insurance company can reduce or cancel the compensation to the customer in order to defraud the customer for money. Surrendered to the police after persuasion from Bak Tin-ming in episode 36.
John Chan Ka-fei	Vincent (周諾言)	Main Villain in this drama Director of the Northern Light Insurance Company. Eva's fiancé Was suspected by Rachel that he was related to Eva's death. In episode 32, In order to defraud the client's money and framed Fong Chi-keung, he forged Fong Chi-keung's documents and Fong Chi-keung was arrested by the police. In episode 33, Yip Chi found out about his crime/corruption and she recorded it. In episode 35, Cheung Tung wanted to kill him but Rachel stopped Cheung Tung making Cheung Tung only shoot around Vincent's head. Because he was the one who pushed Yip Chi down resulting to her death, he claimed that he had depression, and because of this illness, he pushed Yip Chi down. Therefore, he was sentenced to a mental hospital for treatment for one year. In episode 36, he was held hostage by Cheung Tung in his mental hospital room with Cheung Tung holding a knife at his neck. Cheung Tung took away the recording pen with his crimes recorded in it. He was later arrested by the police because of the recording pen and because Jin Shang-wen told the police all about their crimes.
Mimi Kung	Eva (黃倚梅)	President of the Greater China Division of Northern Lights Insurance Company; Cheung Tung's ex-wife and the superior's superior's superior's superior (one of Cheung Tung's big boss). Vincent's fiancée. She was kidnapped after discovering that someone in the company was related to an international telephone fraud group. In episode 25, she was pushed down the elevator shaft and was injured by a screw which resulted in her death.
Hugo Ng	Chung Gor (To Chung) (鬆哥/杜鬆)	The CEO of his film company Do Sum-yu's father. Cici Baby was the boss of the film company as well and also Chung Gor's girlfriend. He later broke up with Cici Baby and then got back together. Friends with Cheung Tung, Fong Chi-keung, and Bak Tin-ming. Had a slight crush on Yip Chi. He used to be in the underworld (gangs) when he was young. The boss of Mike, appreciates his abilities to make money and hopes that Mike can become his son-in-law. In episode 34, he learned that Cheung Tung wanted to buy a black-market pistol (gun) to avenge Yip Chi and so, he immediately contacted his acquaintances in the underworld and black-market and ordered everyone to ban the sale of guns.
Xu Dongdong	Cici Baby ( (何玉蓮)	One of Chung Gor's actress. Chung Gor's girlfriend, later broke up but then got back together. Bak Tin-ming's ex-girlfriend. Enemies with Do Sum-yu. Moved to Hog. Kong with her parents when she was eleven years old, had to become a star/famous under the pressure of her mother and became alienated/estranged from her parents when she grew up. Because Chung Gor was mad at her, when she went down the stairs, she fell down and injured herself. She used this injury to her advantage and claimed that she had paraplegia, forcing Chung Gor to take care of her but also making Bak Tin-ming investigate her. In episode 32, Bak Tin-ming was able to secretly record her using his hidden camera showing that she was faking paraplegia and threatened to send it to Chung Gor. In episode 36, after Bak Tin-ming confessed his illness to Chung Gor and reunited/persuaded Dou Sum-yu again.
Alex Lam	Mark Yuan Jun (袁俊)	Lawyer for Chung Gor. Nephew of Fong Chi-keung. likes Do Sum-yu. Friend of Bak Tin-ming and consults with Bak Tin-ming's in ways to pursue Do Sum-yu like what she likes. In episode 36, he was able to go on a bike trip around the world with Do Sum-yu.
Yanni Wang	Ah Shui (楚淼淼)	FIT bartender and social worker Fong Chi-keung's subordinate and friend. Cheung Tung, Bak Tin-ming, Do Sum-yu, and Yip Chi's friend.
Sammi Cheung Sau-man	Vivi (Vivi)	Secretary and receptionist for Fong Chi-keung; Friends with Cheung Tung, Bak Tin-ming, and Do Sum-yu.
Bond Chan Siu-pong	Frankie (Frankie)	Helped the International Telephone Fraud Group. Was killed episode 27 after stealing customer information from a Protection Company and selling it to the phone scam group.
Adrian Chau Chi-man	Tommy	Police officer (inspector). He is good friends with Cheung Tung. Is the police officer in charge of many of the cases that have relation to the fake insurance claim cases. In episode 34, he had to body check Cheung Tung at the FIT Bar because there were rumours going around that he had bought a gun from the underworld. He checked Cheung Tung but couldn't find anything unknowing that Cheung Tung had hidden it in an ice bucket.
Tong Chun-ming	Ho Kwok Leung (何國亮)	Business liar meaning that he tricks people into opening a business and then having to pay him money. He divorced his wife who he has kids with to try to get together with Yip Chi. In episode 16, he tried to rape Yip Chi only to be stopped by Cheung Tung.
Dickson Wong	Barbecued pork (叉燒/馮偉業)	Gangster he was Yip Chi's Fiancé and was killed by Cheung Tung years ago.
Janice Shum Ho-yan	Amy (金太)	Jin Shang-wen's wife. Her father was the founders of Northern Lights Insurance Company, but they have been operating by illegal means later on.
Jeremy Tsui	Ken	Tiffany's brother. Do Sum-yu's missing boyfriend of 8 years. He was lost in an accident while diving with Dou Sum-yu in Guam eight years ago. He was severely injured by the accident and it took him six years to fully recover. Lives in Slovakia. He suffers from brain cancer. His sister Tiffany lied that he had died but Bak Tin-ming and Dou Sum-yu found out that was not true in episode 30. In episode 30, he suddenly fainted on the street and was admitted to the hospital. After that, he asked Bak Tin-ming to give Dou Sum-yu the dying letter for him, and hoped to conceal his illness from Dou Sum-yu.
Rose Chan	Tiffany	Ken's sister. Hates Dou Sum-yu because her brother, Ken was severely injured in a diving accident with Dou Sum-yu. In episode 29, told Dou Sum-yu that Ken had died, but was later revealed by Dou Sum-yu and Bak Tin-Ming that that was not true. In episode 30, she told Bak Tin-ming that her brother had brain cancer.
Hai Lu	Rachel	Eva's half sister and Cheung Tung's former sister-in-law. Likes Cheung Tung. Started appearing from episode 25 and onward. Found out that the death of Yip Chi and her sister was related to Vincent. Graduated from psychology and psychiatric research. Licensed to be an expert witness. In episode 34, she became Cheung Tung's psychologist and prescribed medication for him to eat, although, Cheung Tung did not eat the medication. In episode 36, she helped Cheung Tung give the voice recorder that contained the evidence of Jin Shang-wen and Vincent to Bak Tin-ming. After Cheung Tung recovered and was discharged from the mental hospital, she decided to live with him.
Xiwei Wang	Kay (謝淑賢)	Famous star and Bak Tin-ming's girlfriend but later broke up. Had another boyfriend and had a baby with him. In episode 26, She informed Bak Tin-ming that she was pregnant, but the father of the baby in her tummy was not him.
Will Or	Jeff	One of Yip Chi's insurance customer.
蕭凱欣 Leah Siu Lai-man	Yan	Employee of Chung Gor's film company.
莫偉文Bert Mok Wai-man	Chung Bo (鐘波)	Taxi driver and father of CiCi Baby. Estranged with her daughter.
Wong Man Piu	Fat Bo (肥波)	Member of the underworld. Went to ship Chi to collect her debt only to be stopped by Cheung Tung.
Anita Kwan	Lam Bing (藍冰)	Tutoring/tuition teacher and Vincent's wife.
Cheng Fan Sang / Cheng Ka Sang		Gang member. Tried to hurt Yip Chi but was stopped by Cheung Tung who called his Gang leader making him go away.
Anjaylia Chan ka-po (youth) and Nina Paw	Bak Siu-ling (百小玲)	Tsui Yin's undisclosed girlfriend and a Bak Tin-ming's mother. Suffers from Alzheimer's disease.
Oscar Leung	Tsui Yin (徐賢)	Bak Siu-ling's undisclosed boyfriend and Bak Tin-ming's father. Hollywood Star. Died a year and a half ago.

== Insurance Cases ==
=== Case #1 – Fake Doctor Paper Fraud Insurance (Ep 1) ===
Case investigated by Dou Sum-yu and Bak Tin-ming.

- Lokyii as Tracy. Bak Tin-ming investigates her as they think she is getting fake doctor's paper to get away from work and get insurance money.

=== Case #2 – Malaysia Beach Carnival Big Bang (Ep 1–2) ===
Case investigated by Cheung Tung, Bak Tin-ming, and Do Sum-yu.

- Jeannie Chan as Joanne, the injured female. She is Fok Chung's girlfriend and was seriously injured in the first episode. She was able to recover.
- Tony Wu as Jack Fok Chung (霍聰), Joanne's boyfriend. He crashed his car through the market afterwards making many injured and many terrorist claimed this attack as theirs.
- Lam Yiu-sing as Li Yin-ka (李彥嘉). Moon's boyfriend. He wanted to retaliate against Lam Kwong-ming for his frivolousness, the fireworks she put in his back pocket triggered the incident.
- Evelyn On Hei Ting as Moon. li Yin-ka's girlfriend.
- Unknown Actor as Lam Kwok-ming (林光明), was retaliated by Li Yin-ka for being frivolous at the scene of the carnival. He was killed by the fireworks and dust explosion caused by Li Yin-ka in his back pocket.

=== Case #3 – Bank Robbery (Ep 3–5) ===
Case investigated by Cheung Tung.

- Philip Keung as “Thin Ribs” (排骨細), Ah Bi's father
  betrayed his brother, Long Dabao. In episode 4, he was chased by the gang after his daughter robbed the gang's money. In episode 5, he was almost killed by the gang. Fortunately, Cheung Tung and Bak Tin-ming arrived to save him. Because his daughter murdered someone to save him, he cleaned her daughter's finger prints on the knife and put his. He was arrested and jailed for murder and robbery.
- Hedwig Tam as Ah Bi, Thin Ribs’ daughter. In episode 4, she and her dad were chased by the gang after she robbed the gang's money. In episode 5, he was almost killed by the gang. Fortunately, Cheung Tung and Bak Tin-ming arrived to save him. Because she murdered someone to save her dad, her dad cleaned her finger prints on the knife and put his. Her dad, Thin Ribs, was arrested and jailed for murder and robbery.
- Singh Hartihan Bitto as Long Dabao. He is a bank security guard and was the security guard present during the robbery. Cheung Tung is his idol. In episode 3, he was shot in the chest and almost died. In episode 4, while in hospital, he was mistaken for taking part in the bank robbery because his brother, Thin Ribs hid 20,000 yuan in his drawer as a sorry.

=== Case #4 – Fake Will (Ep 3–7) ===
Case investigated by Bak Tin-ming and Do Sum-yu.

- Maggie Shiu as Linda Wong Lin (黃蓮). She is suspected of killing off the husbands who have changed their will to her so that she will get all the money. She now has a new man who is an old man named Richard, who later changes his will to her name instead of his kids. He has blood cancer and needs a matching bone marrow. The chances were very small but Linda tried and at the end, hers matched and Richard could recover. She also spent many of her late husbands will money on fighting court cases in Taiwan.
- Johnny Ngan Kwok Leung as Richard (陳李察). He has blood cancer and his first wife has died. He met Linda when dancing outside. He changed the name of his will to her and she tests to see if her bone marrow matches. At the end, her bone marrow matched and according to Bak Tin-ming, he guessed Richard could live another 10 years. He is also the owner of a seafood shop.

=== Case #5 – Mini Storage Fire (Ep 8–9) ===
Case investigated by Cheung Tung, Bak Tin-ming, and Do Sum-yu.

- Evergreen Mak Cheung-ching as Yan Chi-hang, In episode 8, himself, Ah Wing, and Uncle Mi ate hot pot in his mini-storage shop to celebrate Uncle Mi's birthday. They ate it in a secretly built and illegal room in his shop. After a sudden and strong shake like an earthquake occurring in the building, Uncle Mi accidentally overturned the stove and caused a serious fire. The sudden shake in the building was later found out to be because of a diamond robbery (Case #7). Because of the fire, it caused nearly all the objects in the mini-storage to be burned, and many tenants demanded huge compensation from Yan Chi-hang.
- Simon Lo Man Kit as Ah Wing(阿榮), street cleaner and good friend of Yan Chi-hang and Uncle Mi. In episode 8, they ate hot pot in Yan Chi-hang's mini-storage shop to celebrate Uncle Mi's birthday. They ate it in a secretly built and illegal room in the shop. After a sudden and strong shake like an earthquake occurring in the building, Uncle Mi accidentally overturned the stove and caused a serious fire. The sudden shake in the building was later found out to be because of a diamond robbery (Case #7).
- Lok San-mak as Uncle Mi (迷叔). He lives on the street and is good friends with Yan Chi-hang and Ah Wing. In episode 8, himself, Yan Chi-hang, and Ah Wing ate hot pot in Yan Chi-hang's mini-storage shop to celebrate his birthday. They ate it in a secretly built and illegal room in the shop. After a sudden and strong shake like an earthquake occurring in the building, he accidentally overturned the stove and caused a serious fire. The sudden shake in the building was later found out to be because of a diamond robbery (Case #7).

=== Case #6 -Post-traumatic stress claims (Ep 9–13) ===
Case investigated by Bak Tin-ming and Do Sum-yu.

- Angie Cheong as Mak Chi-man or Ms. Mak (麥子文), singer and music teacher. She is Gordon's mom and Ma Ho-tin's ex-wife. She used Gordon's post-kidnapping to make it seem like Gordon cannot talk because of the kidnapping when actually, she told Gordon to do it.
- Max Wong as Gordon, Ms. Mak's son. He is a rising kid singer. He was kidnapped and had trauma because of this. However, his mom used his kidnapping to try to get the insurance money. Bak Tin-Ming and Do Sum-yu thought he actually had Post Traumatic Stress Syndrome making him unable to talk but later, Gordon goes out to sing behind his mom's back. Later, it is discovered Gordon has trama as he was scared of fire and the dark and that his mom was keeping him from talking to get the insurance money.
- Wilson Tsui as Ma Ho-Tin (馬浩田), father of Gordon and ex-husband of Ms. Mak. He divorced Ms. Mak because he loved another woman who in Case #7, turns out to be tricking him and just taking his money. He is very regretful about divorcing. He is the owner of a diamond company that appears in Case #7.

=== Case #7 – Diamond Burglary Case (Ep 10–11) ===
Case investigated by Cheung Tung and Do Sum-yu.

- Wilson Tsui as Ma Ho-tin (馬浩田), the owner of the diamond company. In episode 10, he reported that a batch of diamonds worth 50 million were stolen. In fact, he stole the diamonds to pay the ransom to his son's kidnapped and reported them as lost in order to defraud insurance money. He kidnapped Dou Sum-yu but Cheung Tung saved her and he told him about Chan Fai and him pushing him onto the street and about what Lau Chun-jun did.
- Iris Chung as Lau Chun-jun (劉俊軍), Ma Ho-Tin's secretary and girlfriend. Chan Fai's mistress. Herself and Chan Fai plotted and tried to steal the diamonds. In episode 11, she was arrested by the police for being part of the attempted robbery which caused the building to shake.
- Deon Cheung Chi as Chan Fai (陳輝), Lau Chun-jun's lover. Plotted with Lau Chun-jun to steal the diamonds and he exploded the safe door, but because the explosives used were too powerful, it caused a strong shaking in the building and indirectly caused a serious fire in the mini-storage below. In episode 11, he obtained evidence that Ma Ho-tin stole diamonds and is defrauding to obtain insurance money. He used this to threaten Ma Ho-tin but was subsequently pushed out of the road by Ma Ho-tin and killed by the incoming car.

=== Case #8 – Emerald Necklace Stealing the Dragon and Turning the Phoenix (Episode 14–16) ===
Case investigated by Cheung Tung, Bak Tin-ming and Do Sum-yu.

- Irene Wan as Sister Mi (Mi姐), outdated idol and actress. She was dissatisfied with the jewellery company's replacement of spokespersons and was not taken seriously by the company, so she deliberately exchanged the genuine and fake necklaces to play tricks on the jewellery company. After that, her house was stolen by her driver, and the emerald necklace was also stolen by the driver.
- Louis Yan as Leung Mei (森美), the magician of the magic show Sister Mi was on. Was suspected by Bak Tin-ming of being the one that stole the necklace during the performance.
- Zhihui Yu as Crystal, Sister Mi's Assistant/President of Sister Mi Fan Club.
- Virginia Lau as Cherry, the person in charge of the Emerald Necklace Company. Made a fake for Sister Mi to wear outside the time of the media.

=== Case #9 – Concealing the condition and wealthy competition (episodes 16–18 ===
Case investigated by Cheung Tung, Bak Tin-ming, and Do Sum-yu.

- Ko Chun-man as Lam Chuen-yat (林泉溢), Pang Wai-ling's husband and an antique shop owner. Lam Chuen-hoi and Lam Chuen-yang's brother. Pang Yiu-yeung's brother-in-law. He was seriously injured in a traffic accident while taking his wife to the hospital in episode 17 and was admitted to the hospital. In episode 18, when he was critically ill, Pang Yiu-yeung had his oxygen hose removed causing him to die.
- Akina Hong-wah as Pang Wai-ling (彭慧玲), Lam Chuen-yat's wife and Pang Yiu-yeung's sister. She suffers from gastric/stomach cancer. She was exposed by Dou Sun-yu after she purchased life insurance but concealed her condition. As a result, she was unable to obtain compensation. In episode 17, she was seriously injured in a traffic accident with her husband, Lam Chuen-yat and was admitted to the hospital. She was in critical condition and her husband was also in critical condition. Her husband was killed by her brother, Pang Yiu-yeung.
- King Kong Lee as Pang Yiu-yeung (彭耀陽), Pang Wai-ling's brother. In episode 17, Dou Sum-yu ordered her sister's life insurance to be cancelled because she did not say she had stomach cancer. He hates Pang Wai-ling's husband, Lam Chuen-yat, and stole the jade bracelet from Lam Chuen-yat's antique shop in episode 17. In episode 18, he was fighting for her sister and brother-in-law, Lam Chuen-yat's inheritance, but whoever died first, the one still surviving's family would get the money because the two would anyway die from their injuries. He was discovered by Dou Sum-yu when he pulled Lam Chuen-yat's oxygen hose causing Lam Chuen-yat's death: he was subdued by medical staff, and was arrested by the police.
- Eric Cheng Kai-tai as Lam Chuen-hoi, (林泉海) Lam Chuen-yat and Lam Chuen-yang's brother.
- Casper Chan Sze-tsai as Lam Chuen-yang (林泉洋), alarm Chuen-yat and Lam Chuen-hoi's brother.
- Unknown Actor as “Golden Retriever” (金毛), one of Pang Yiu-yeung's men.

=== Case #10 – Using the elderly to apply for insurance to defraud insurance money (Episode 19–20) ===
Case investigated by Cheung Tung.

- Lo Hei-loi as (梅院長), The godmother of Yip Chi and the director of the nursing home. She used Yip Chi to defraud. In episode 19, Yip Chi reported her to the police and she was arrested in episode 20.

=== Case #11 – Athlete Claims (Episode 20–22) ===
Case investigated by Bak Tin-ming and Do Sum-yu.

- Telford Wong Ting-fung as Fong Chi-ming (方志明), the boyfriend of Chan On-yee, broke up for a while, but reunited later. Janice's swimming coach. He also suffers from heart problem which can lead to heart attacks. In the past six months, he reported 15 times that he was injured for different reasons and filed a claim with the insurance company. The amount ranges from $8000 – $1.5 million.
- Stephanie Au Hoi Shun as Chan On-yee (陳安兒), The girlfriend of the Hong Kong team swimmer Fong Chi-ming, broke up for a while, but reunited later. Likes bowling and got into bowling because of Andy Lau.
- Brian Wong Chak-fung as Hong Kong National Swimming Team Coach.
- Liu Siyuan as Janice. Her mentor is Fong Chi-ming.
- Damon Law as Ah Fung, a TV station host.

=== Case #12 – Missing Doctor Life Insurance Claim (Episode 22–24) ===
Case investigated by Cheung Tung, Bak Tin-ming, and Do Sum-yu.

- Zhai Tianlin as Ben Wong Kam-wing/Zheng Ping (黃錦榮/鄭平), Rex's friend. He pretended to be Zheng Ping who sells fruits in the Vietnam Village in Prague. He pretends to be Zheng Ping because in Hong Kong, he was a surgeon who was accused of manslaughter in a medical error six years ago. He jumped off the boat and pretended to commit suicide because of fear of going to prison. Purchased Zheng Ping's household registration status and lived as Zheng Ping. Seven years after his disappearance, his family intends to apply to the court for his death and receive life insurance compensation, but he was later found to have appeared in the news of the Prague Square shooting as the hero who saved many people. During the investigation, he has always denied his identify as Wong Kam-wing and planned to commit suicide as Zheng Ping, but after Dou Sum-yu took his daughter to see him, he decided to give up suicide and was willing to return to Hong Kong to accept legal sanctions.
- MC Jin as Rex, a friend of Zheng Ping. Owner of a hot dog stall in Prague's Vietnam Village. At the end of episode 22, he found out that what Cheung Tung and Bak Tin-ming said were real because Zheng Ping showed him his passport with the name Wong Kam-wing. He was rescued by Wong Kam-wing when he was stabbed by a knife when he was young. In episode 23, he helped exchange the DNA box of Zheng Ping so that Cheung Tung and Bak Tin-ming would not get Zheng Ping's real DNA of Wong Kam-wing. Also, in episode 23, he was seriously injured by blocking a gun for Zheng Ping/Wong Kam-wing and Zheng Ping helped him do first aid and pull out the bullet to save his life.
- Pancy Chan as Helen, Wong Kam-wing's wife. She intends to apply to the court to pronounce Wong Kam-wing dead and receive life insurance compensation after Wong Kam-wing disappeared for seven years.
- Constance Kong as Bobo, Wong Kam-wing's daughter.
- Chan Kin-long as an Interpol. He defies the Vietnamese gang when hunting down Zheng Ping, who was impersonated by Wong Kam-wing. He later died.
