= Connie Mak Kit-man =

Hong Kong singer and actress

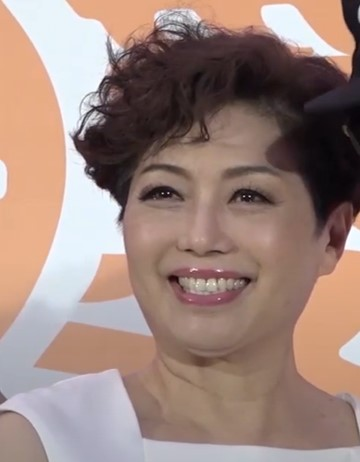
- Mak attending the press conference for Caritas Star Studded Charity Show (明愛暖萬心) 2019.
- Born: 19 December 1954 (age 71); British Hong Kong
- Occupations: Singer; actress
- Spouse: Kwong Wa (m. 1992)
- Children: 1 son, 1 daughter

Chinese name
- Traditional Chinese: 麥潔文
- Simplified Chinese: 麦洁文
Transcriptions
Standard Mandarin
- Hanyu Pinyin: Mài Jiéwén
Yue: Cantonese
- Jyutping: Mak^{6} Kit^{3} Man^{6}
- Musical career
- Also known as: Connie Mak, Kitman Mak

Connie Mak Kit-man (born 19 December 1954 in HK; Chinese: 麥潔文; Jyutping: Mak^{6} Kit^{3} Man^{6}), also called Connie Mak and Kitman Mak, is a Hong Kong singer and actress.

== Life and career ==
Mak's ancestral hometown is Qingyuan, Guangdong.

In 1977, Mak competed in a Miss Hong Kong Pageant but did not win the title. She made albums for primarily Crown Records (娛樂唱片) and Cinepoly Records. Some of her songs are heard in Cantonese-language series and films.

In 1983, Mak recorded "Rhine River Romance" (萊茵河之戀), lyricised by Cheng Kwok-kong (鄭國江) and composed by Joseph Koo. Hong Kong University professor, Stephen Chu (朱耀偉), considered the song the sentiment of a fairy tale.

The International Federation of the Phonographic Industry (IFPI) in 1984 awarded certifications to Lam's albums released in 1983 by Crown Records. Her album Rhine River Romance (萊茵河之戀) received a Local Platinum Disc award (本地白金唱片) for selling over 30,000 copies in Hong Kong, and her other album Golden Date (黃金約會) received a Local Gold Disc Award for selling over 15,000 copies in the same area.

Mak's 1986 self-titled album, released by Cinepoly Records, received a Local Gold Disc Award from IFPI in 1988.

In 1989, she sang "Years of Silence" (歲月無聲), written by Gene Lau and composed by Beyond band member Wong Ka Kui, before the rock band Beyond re-recorded it in a rockier style.

She is married to actor Kwong Wa since 19 December 1992, with a son and a daughter.

She held a concert on 16 October 2019 (BACK月黑風高旺角夜麥潔文MUSIC 2019).

== Discography ==
Unless noted, the following albums are in Cantonese language. Unofficial English translations are interpretations of Wikipedia editors. Compilations lacking newly released songs are omitted.

HTA Records (香泰統一唱片, HTA統一唱片)

- Not Investigating the Past 前塵莫追究 (tsin tsan mok zeoi gau), 1981

Crown Records (娛樂唱片)

- Rhine River Romance (萊茵河之戀 loi yaan hoh tzi loon, 1983)
- Golden Date (黃金約會 wong gam yeok wooi, 1984)
- The Young Wanderer (江湖浪子 Kong woo long tsi, 1984), as Connie Mak
- Five Lucky Stars (五福星 ng fook sing, 1984), with Derek Wan, Michelle Pau, Teresa Wong Yee-kar (黃綺加 / 王綺嘉 / 王綺加), and Susanne Ho Kar-lai (何嘉麗)
- Laiyinhe zhi lian / Jianghu langzi (萊茵河之戀 • 江湖浪子, 1985), Mandarin, as Connie Mak
- The Grand Hong Kong (大香港 dai heung gong, 1985), as Connie Mak

Cinepoly Records

- Kitman Mak (麥潔文, 1986)
- Dancing Queen, 1987, EP
- Come on Rock! (1988)
- Kitman Remix (1988), EP
- Bewildered (迷亂 mai lyun, 1988)
- New Songs and Hits (新曲與精選, 1989), compilation

World Record International (世紀)

- Eternally Unforgotten (畢生難忘 baat sang naan mong, 1990)

Forward Music Hong Kong (豐華唱片)

- Presentation (呈獻 Tsing Hin, 2003)
