= Patricia Ching Yee Chong =

Chinese actress from Hong Kong

- Chinese: 莊靜而
- Born: December 13, 1959 (age 66); Hong Kong
- Other names: Chong Ching Yee, Chong Ching-yee, Chong Jing-Yee, Patricia Leung, Patricia Chong, Patricia Chong Jing Yee
- Occupation: Actress
- Years active: 1980–1997
- Children: 1

Patricia Ching Yee Chong (Chinese: 莊靜而) is a Chinese actress from Hong Kong. Chong is known for Sword Stained with Royal Blood, the 1985 Wuxia TV series that was broadcast on TVB.

== Early life ==
On December 13, 1959, Chong was born in Hong Kong.

== Career ==
In 1980, Chong started her acting career. Chong is Ah Ling, an innocent and naive girl who is raped, in The Beasts, a horror thriller film directed by Dennis Yu.

In 1985, Chong is Wan Ching-ching (or Wen Ching-ching, Chinese: 夏青青) in Sword Stained with Royal Blood, the 1985 Wuxia TV series (TVB) adapted from Louis Cha's novel Sword Stained with Royal Blood. Chong's character is the daughter in the Wan Chinese: 夏) family. In the 1977 TV series of the same title, her character was played by Wen Hsueh-erh. In the 2007 TV series (in mandarin) of the same title, her character was played by Eva Shengyi Huang. There are also several film adaptation of the similar and same titles, her character was played by Sheung-koon Kwan-wai (1958/1959 Sword of Blood and Valour in Cantonese), Wen Hsueh-erh (1981 Sword Stained with Royal Blood in Mandarin), and Elsie Yeh (1993 The Sword Stained with Royal Blood in Cantonese).

In 1995, Chong is Carrie Chin in Summer Snow, the award winning film directed by Ann Hui.

In 1997, Chong retired as an actress in Hong Kong.

== Filmography ==
=== Films ===
- 1980 No Big Deal
- 1980 The Savour
- 1980 The Beasts - Ah Ling
- 1981 The Security
- 1982 Food for the Sharks
- 1982 Once Upon a Rainbow - Angie
- 1983 My Mother
- 1984 Law with Two Phases - Kit's girlfriend.
- 1984 Wrong Wedding Trail - Miss Cheng's other sister
- 1986 Heavenly Swordsman and the Spoiled - Tung Ying
- 1987 Lady in Black - Ann Cheung
- 1991 Feud Within the Truth
- 1992 The Truth of a Killer
- 1995 Summer Snow

=== Television series ===
- 1982 Soldier of Fortune - Poon Hiu-ton
- 1983 The Superpower
- 1985 The Feud That Never Was
- 1985 Sword Stained with Royal Blood - Wan Ching-ching
- 1986 The Yang's Saga - Daughter of Poon Hung and Concubine Poon

== Personal life ==
Chong is married and has one daughter. Chong and her family lived in Hong Kong and Canada.
