= Michelle Pau =

Hongkongese singer

- Traditional Chinese: 鮑翠薇
- Simplified Chinese: 鲍翠薇
Transcriptions
Standard Mandarin
- Hanyu Pinyin: Bào cuì wēi
Yue: Cantonese
- Jyutping: baau1 ceoi3 mei4

Michelle Pau Tsui-mee (Chinese: 鮑翠薇) is a Hong Kong singer, primary active in 1980s. She sang several theme songs for several television drama series produced by TVB, Hong Kong's leading broadcaster, and also performed on the music programme Jade Solid Gold produced by the same network. She later transitioned into a career in the insurance industry.

== Career ==
Pau recorded three studio albums for Crown Records: I Can Just Expect (我衹有期待, 1983), kyut zin jyun mou mun (決戰玄武門, 1984), and hou neoi dong caa (好女當差, 1985).

=== First album ===
"Red Bean Crave" (紅豆相思), one of tracks from her debut album I Can Just Expect, was originally featured as the main theme song of a 1941 Hong Kong film Red Bean Song (紅荳曲), whose Chinese title the song originally used. Her own recording of the preexisting song helped her rise to fame ("成名").

Pau's debut album received a Local Platinum Disc award (本地白金唱片) from the International Federation of the Phonographic Industry (IFPI) in 1984 for selling over 30,000 copies. Ivan Wong (黃國恩) in 2018 praised the 1983 album as overall very good ("很好成績").

=== Second album ===
Of tracks from her second album, Pau sang the main theme song "Sorrows in My Dreams" (夢裏幾番哀) and one of sub-theme songs "Hiding Away My Tears" (不見我淚流) for a 1984 TVB series The Foundation, both songs praised by especially viewers ("教觀眾非常受落"). Her second album (1984) received a Local Platinum Disc award in 1988.

=== Third album ===
Of tracks from her third album, Pau sang "Earthbound Pairing" (兩地情 "leong dei cing"), the main theme song for a 1985 TVB series The Legend of the General Who Never Was (薛仁貴征東). The song conveys its protagonist yearning for a lasting reciprocation ("相思深情"). She also sang another track “ding tin lap dei” (頂天立地), the main theme song for another TVB series of the same year The Brave Squad (好女當差).

=== Fourth album ===
Pau recorded her 1987 album Love Revolution (愛的革命) for the Rising Sun Records (日昇唱片公司). Its titular song is the Cantonese cover version of Madonna's "Open Your Heart".

== Discography ==
The Chinese titles were translated by Wikipedia editors.

- I Just Expect / A Day You Forget Me (我衹有期待 • 有一日忘掉我 ngo zi yau kei doi / yau yat yat mong diu ngo, 1983)
  Official title: Baau Ceoi-mei (鮑翠薇); literal translation: I Have Only Expectations
- Five Lucky Stars (五福星 ng fook sing, 1984), with Derek Wan, Connie Mak Kit-man, Teresa Wong Yee-kar (黃綺加 / 王綺嘉 / 王綺加), and Susanne Ho Kar-lai (何嘉麗)
- Main Theme of 'The Foundation' (決戰玄武門 主題曲 kyut zin jyun mou mun zyu tai kuk, 1984)
- hou neoi dong caa / Sit Jan Gwai zing dung (好女當差 • 薛仁貴征東, 1985)
  Official title: Michelle Pau (鮑翠薇)
- Love Revolution (愛的革命 ngoi dik gaak ming, 1987)
