= Adrian Wong Tsz-ching =

Hong Kong actress (born 1990)

Adrian Wong
- 黃芷晴
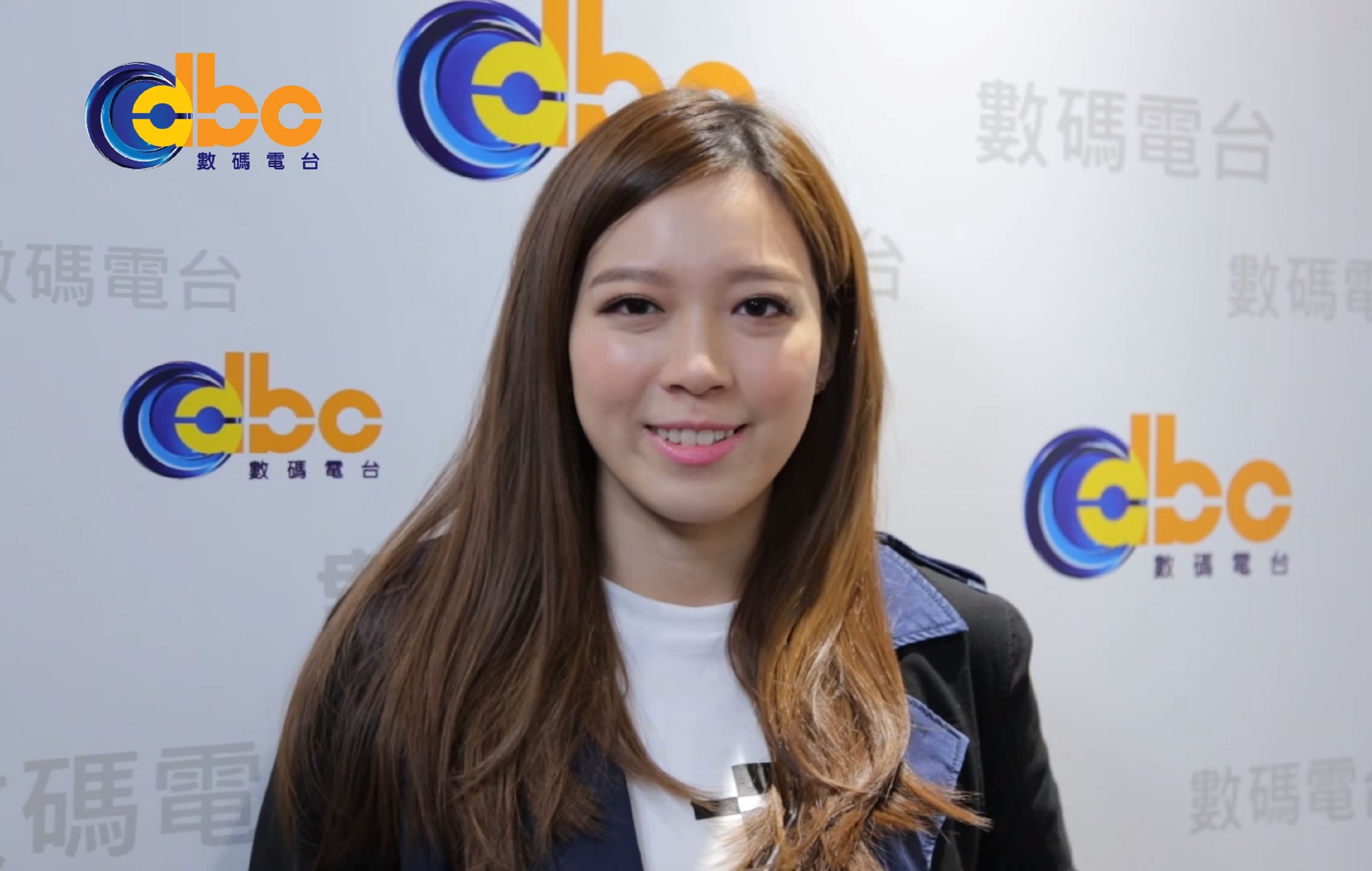
- Wong in 2014
- Born: Adrian Wong Tsz-ching; May 2, 1990 (age 36); British Hong Kong
- Education: St. Rose of Lima's College; Hong Kong Polytechnic University
- Occupation: Actress
- Years active: 2012–present
- Agent: HKTV (2012–2015)
- Parents: Felix Wong (father); Leung Kit-wah (mother)

Chinese name
- Traditional Chinese: 黃芷晴
- Simplified Chinese: 黄芷晴
Transcriptions
Standard Mandarin
- Hanyu Pinyin: Huáng Zhǐqíng
Yue: Cantonese
- Jyutping: Wong^{4} Zi^{2} Cing^{1}
- Website: Adrian Wong Tsz-ching on Facebook

Adrian Wong Tsz-ching (born 2 May 1990) is a Hong Kong actress. She is best known as the daughter of Felix Wong, one of the Five Tiger Generals of TVB.

== Background ==
Born on 2 May 1990 to actors Felix Wong and Leung Kit-wah in Hong Kong. Wong attended St. Rose of Lima's College and Hong Kong Polytechnic University. Leung died of organ failure at Gleneagles Hong Kong Hospital on May 26, 2020. In 2011 she started her hand-made product business under her own brand Oh My Deer.

In 2012, she joined HKTV to pursue her acting career, which she left in June 2015 as the contract expired. In 2015 she was discovered by executive producer Gary Tang, and starred as a lead actress for the first time in the Guangdong Radio and Television series As Long As Love is Forever Present with actor Oscar Chan. The TV series was released in Mainland China in December 2015.

== Filmography ==
=== Film ===
Year	English title	Original title	Role	Remarks	Ref.
2014	I Sell Love	販賣愛		Cameo	
2015	Office	華麗上班族		Cameo	
2016	Three	三人行	Nurse	Cameo	

=== Television series ===
Year	English title	Original title	Role	Network	Remarks	Ref.
2015	Incredible Mama	我阿媽係黑玫瑰		HKTV	supporting role	
2015	Doom+5 Episode 1: Commitment	末日+5(單元一)	Mang Mang	HKTV	supporting role	
2015	Paranormal Mind	開腦儆探		HKTV	supporting role	
2015	As Long As Love is Forever Present	只有情永在		Guangdong Radio and Television	leading role	

=== Microfilms ===
Year	English title	Original title	Role	Remarks	Ref.
2015	La Couleur	La Couleur	Sophia		

=== Variety shows ===
Year	English title	Original title	Role	Network	Remarks	Ref.
2013	Star's Next Generation	星二代捱世界	Guest	Hong Kong Cable Television	Guest with Felix Wong	
2013	Racing Horizon	放眼馬世界	Host	Asia Television	Hosting with Maggie Wong	
2015	Cuisine Top Secret	食的秘密	Host	HKTV	Hosting with Felix Wong	
