= Kent Tong =

Hong Kong actor (born 1958)

- 湯鎮業
- Born: 29 September 1958 (age 68); British Hong Kong
- Other names: Ken Tong, Kenneth Tong, Tong Chun-yip, Ken Tong Chun-yip
- Occupation: Actor
- Spouses: Jiang Kun (m. 1993; div. 2001) Wen Jing (m. 2008)
- Children: 6
- Relatives: Tong Chun Chung (brother); Roxanne Tong (niece); Cassandre Tong (niece)

Chinese name
- Traditional Chinese: 湯鎮業
- Simplified Chinese: 汤镇业
Transcriptions
Standard Mandarin
- Hanyu Pinyin: Tāng Zhènyè
Yue: Cantonese
- Jyutping: tong1 zan3 jip6

Kenneth Tong Chun-yip (Chinese: 湯鎮業; Jyutping: tong1 zan3 jip6; born 29 September 1958) is a Hong Kong actor. He was a popular TVB actor during the 1980s, nicknamed "Prince" and one of the "Five Tiger Generals" of TVB.

== Early life ==
Kent Tong was born to and grew up in a poor family in Hong Kong. His father was a fisherman who always caught seafood to feed his family. All 12 members of his family lived in a small-sized living room that was only 30 square meters. After graduating from high school, he worked on a salary of around 500 Hong Kong dollars per month.

== Career ==
In 1979, Kent Tong received actor training from the TVB Artist Training Class, and proceeded to act for TVB. Although he has appeared in over a dozen movies, he is mostly known for his work in TVB television series, such as Duen Yu in Demi-Gods and Semi-Devils (1982) and Yin Ching in The Unyielding Master Lim (1986). Tong often undertook roles of princes and villains in TVB dramas.

During the 1980s, Kent Tong, along with Tony Leung Chiu-Wai, Andy Lau, Michael Miu and Felix Wong became known as the Five Tiger Generals of TVB. They were widely considered the most popular and best looking leading male actors in TVB at the time. Everyone called him a nickname "Prince" – the most handsome guy in the group. In 1985, Tong was blamed by the public for the suicide of his then girlfriend, actress Barbara Yung, experiencing depression. At the end of 1986, he left TVB to avoid more negativity.

In 1993, he married former ATV actress Jiang Kun from China, who bore him a daughter and twin sons. However, while he and Jiang Kun were in the midst of their divorce, Kent was in a relationship with another woman from Guangzhou, their son was born in 2000. The couple officially divorced in 2001. In 2008, he married Qingdao native Zou Wenjing, who is 25 years his junior. Their twin girls were born in 2008.

From between the 1990s and now, Tong had switched to develop his food business and also shoot films in China. Tong is appointed as a member of the National Committee of the Chinese People's Political Consultative Conference representing Guangdong Province since December 2007. In 2015, Tong made a comeback to TVB after 30 years with big success of the blockbuster Lord of Shanghai. Besides, he was nominated for Best Actor of the year.

== Filmography ==
=== Television ===
Year	Title	Network	Role
1979	Chor Lau-heung	TVB	
1979	Yesterday's Glitter	TVB	
1980	The Bund	TVB	Chan Hon-lam
1981	Seekers	TVB	
1981	Double Fantasies	TVB	
1981	The Adventurer's	TVB	
1981	Come Rain, Come Shine	TVB	
1982	Soldier of Fortune	TVB	Ying Ji Fai
1982	The Wild Bunch	TVB	Hong Gwan-lei
1982	Demi-Gods and Semi-Devils (1982 TV series)	TVB	Duen Yu
1983	The Bold Ones	TVB	
1983	The Return of The Condor Heroes	TVB	Fok-do
1983	The Legend of the Unknowns	TVB	
1984	Summer Kisses Winter Tears	TVB	
1984	The Foundation	TVB	Lei Yuen Gat
1984	The Rise And Fall of a Stand-in	TVB	
1984	Love Me, Love Me Not	TVB	
1984	The Return of Wong Fei Hung	TVB	Nalan Masanori
1985	The Yang's Saga	TVB	Prince Bat-yin
1985	A Tough Fight	TVB	
1985	The Unyielding Master Lim	TVB	Yin Ching
1985	The Brave Squad	TVB	
1985	Kings of Ideas	TVB	
1987	Beauty of the Han's Dynasty	Taiwan	Emperor Yuan of Han
1988	General Wu San Kwei	Taiwan	Wu San Kwei
1991	Noble Conflict	ATV	
1992	The Rise and Fall of Qing Dynasty IV	ATV	Guangxu Emperor
1993	Secret Battle of The Majesty	ATV	
1993	Who is The Winner III	ATV	
1996	Mission Against Corruption	China	
1997	InterPol	ATV	
1999	A Fuk	China	
2002	The Prisoner	China	
2003	Dong Fang Mu Qin	China	
2005	The Royal Swordsmen	China	Wan Sanqian
2006	Xiang Fen Chuan Qi	China	Zhu Yuanzhang
2009	Pretty Maid	China	
2011	Palace	HBS	Kangxi Emperor
2012	Palace 2	HBS	Ah Ling Ah
2012	Heros in Sui & Tang Dynasties		Emperor Wen of Sui
2015	Lord of Shanghai	TVB	Chak Kam Tong
2015	Legend of Ban Shu	CCTV	Uncle Zhong
2017	OCTB		
2018	Guardian Angel 2018 Web Drama	TVB	Jin Shang-wen
2019	I Beg Your Pardon	TVB	Wen Xiong

=== Films ===
- Once Upon a Rainbow (1982)
- Hell Has No Boundary (1982)
- Nomad (1982)
- Demi-Gods and Semi-Devils (1982)
- Red Spell Spells Red (1983)
- Maybe It's Love (1984)
- The Surgeon (1984)
- Police Story (1985)
- The Story of Dr. Sun Yat Sen (1986)
- Eastern Condors (1987)
- You OK, I'm OK (1987)
- Call Girl '88 (1988)
- The Dragon Family (1988)
- Bitter Taste of Blood (1988)
- City Cops (1989)
- The Tigers (1991) – Best Supporting Actor Nomination for The Tigers (11th Hong Kong Film Awards)
- Pretty Woman (1991)
- Take Me (1991)
- Fox Legend (1991)
- The Days of Being Dumb (1992)
- The Pearl of Oriental (1992)
- Royal Tramp II (1992)
- Sex And Curse (1992)
- Sisters in Law (1992)
- A Matter of Life or Death (1992)
- Hero of Hong Kong 1949 (1993)
- Lord of the East China Sea (1993)
- Hero – Beyond the Boundary of Time (1993)
- The Tale of a Heroine (1993)
- Bogus Cops (1993)
- Hot Desire (1993)
- Dancing Boy in Underworld Street (1993)
- Pink Panther (1993)
- Battle of No Truce (1993)
- A Man and a Woman (1993)
- Naked Rose (1994)
- Bloody Beast (1994)
- Possessed (1994)
- Reunion (2002)
- Eternal Flame of Fatal Attraction (2003)
- My Jail Story (2003)
- Moving Targets (2004)
- Love is a Many Stupid Thing (2004)
- Dragon Squad (2005)
- My Mother is a Belly Dancer (2006)
- Brothers (2007)
- The Scroll of Wing Chun White Crane (2014)
- Silently Love (2015)
- Doomed Disaster (2015)
- Out of Ordinary (2016)
- Xuan Zang (2016)
- Chasing the Dragon (2017)
- Agent Mr Chan (2018)
- Our Time (2018)
- Dragon Action Secret Code (2019)

=== Variety show ===
Year	English title	Chinese title	Role	Notes
2021	China in Classics	典籍里的中国	King Huai of Chu	
