= Felix Wong =

Hong Kong actor

- 黃日華
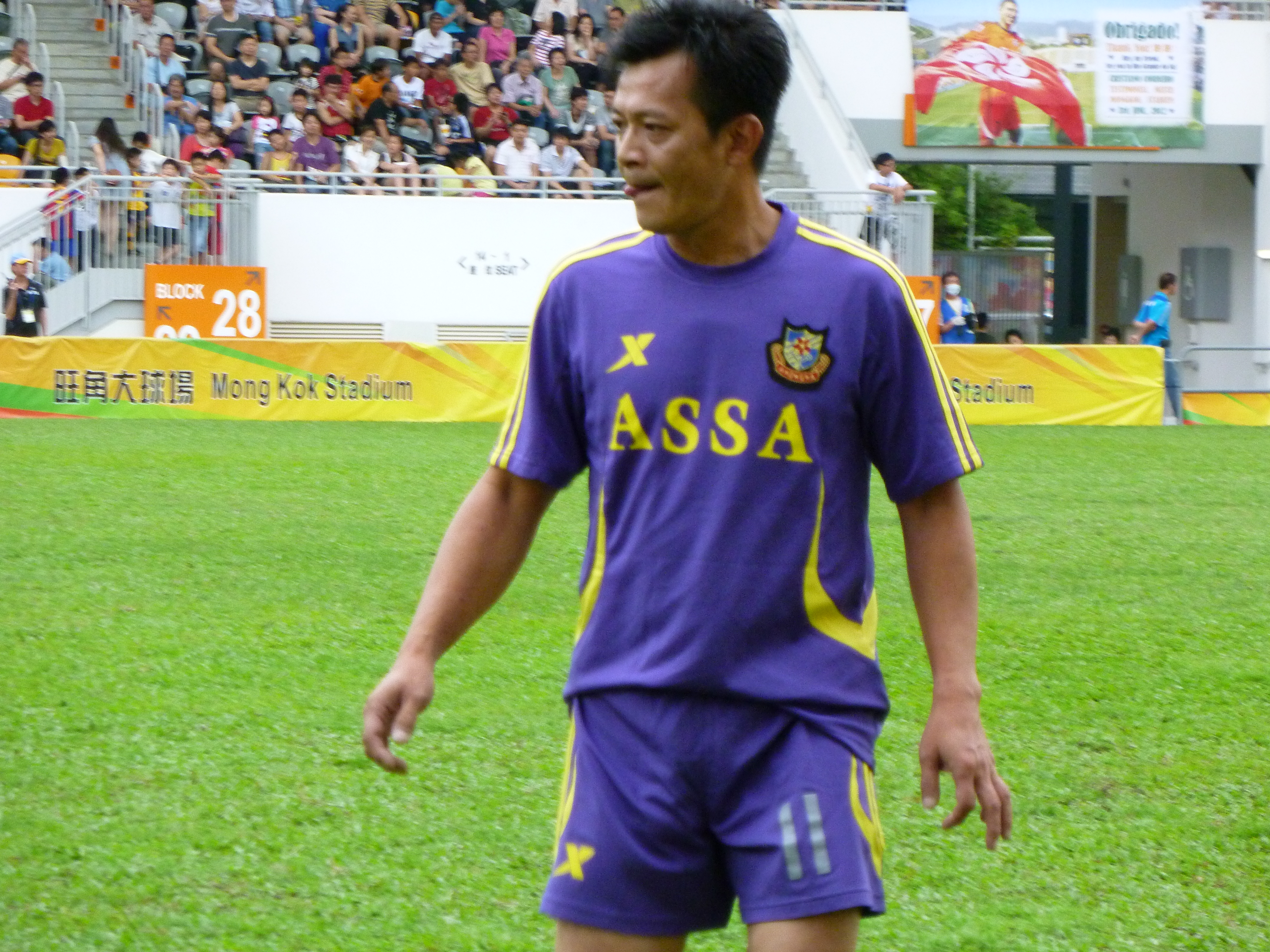
- Wong in 2012
- Born: September 4, 1961 (age 65); British Hong Kong
- Other names: Wah Gor (華哥; lit. Brother Wah); Wong Wah (黃華)
- Occupations: Actor; singer
- Years active: 1980–present
- Spouse: Leung Kit-wah (m. 1988; died 2020)
- Children: Adrian Wong Tsz-ching (daughter)

Chinese name
- Traditional Chinese: 黃日華
- Simplified Chinese: 黄日华
Transcriptions
Standard Mandarin
- Hanyu Pinyin: Huáng Rìhuá
Yue: Cantonese
- Jyutping: Wong4 Jat6-wa4

Felix Wong Yat-wah (born September 4, 1961) is a Hong Kong actor best known for his performances in many wuxia television series produced by TVB, such as The Legend of the Condor Heroes (1983), in which he played the protagonist Kwok Ching. He is considered to be one of the most popular teen idols of the 1980s and was named as "Third Tiger" among Five Tiger Generals of TVB.

== Career ==
Wong was recruited into TVB's Artist Training Academy in September 1979, before his 18th birthday. While he was a trainee, he made cameo appearances in several dramas, such as The Bund (1980). After finish the secondary school in 1981, Wong was offered a major supporting role in The Misadventure of Zoo (1981), which starred Lydia Shum and Adam Cheng. Afterwards, Wong was immediately cast to play the male lead in The Lonely Hunter (1981), which subsequently propelled him to instant fame in Hong Kong. While the drama was airing, Wong received more fan letters than any other popular TVB actors and actresses at the time.

In the mid-1980s, Wong, along with Andy Lau, Tony Leung, Michael Miu and Kent Tong, were called the "Five Tiger Generals of TVB" and said to be the most popular male actors from TVB at that time. According to some polls conducted at the time, Wong had the largest fanbase.

Wong is perhaps best known for his role as the hero Kwok Ching in the 1983 television Hit worldwide series The Legend of the Condor Heroes, an adaptation of Louis Cha's novel of the same title. Wong also starred in another two television adaptations of Cha's novels, Demi-Gods and Semi-Devils (1982) and Sword Stained with Royal Blood (1986). Wong is also notable for his performance in Looking Back in Anger (1989), in which his character was involved in a love triangle with the characters played by Carina Lau and Kathy Chow. Besides playing the roles of the protagonists in most of his works, Wong has also achieved success for his portrayals of antagonists, such as the villain Lee Mat in The Grand Canal (1987), Jamukha in Genghis Khan (1987), and recently as Stone Sir in Gun Metal Grey (2010).

In 1989, Wong left TVB after having completed filming Kim-mo Tuk-ku Kau-pai. He joined ATV and worked on four television series between 1990 and 1992. He also worked in the Taiwanese television drama Imperial Wanderer with Kathy Chow. Wong returned to TVB in 1993 and starred with Amy Chan in Racing Peak, a television series about a horse racing company. He left TVB again on 11 January 2002 to work on some mainland Chinese television series. Wong expressed his unhappiness with TVB in an interview, citing that as the reason for his departure. His last major project in TVB was Treasure Raiders, an adaptation of one of the works of Gu Long.

Wong starred in the 2005 film Wait 'til You're Older after being invited by Andy Lau. In July 2009, after filming Turning Point, Wong revealed that he will be working with Michael Miu in a new crime fiction television drama on TVB in October 2009 called Gun Metal Grey.

In 2025, Wong declared retired from acting career, but still accepted as commercial guest after the statement.

== Personal life ==
Wong started dating fellow actress Leung Kit-wah in 1982 and they got married on December 7, 1988. They have a daughter, Adrian Wong Tsz-ching, on May 1, 1990. Leung died of organ failure at Gleneagles Hospital Hong Kong on May 26, 2020.

== Filmography ==
=== Film ===
Year	Film	Role	Notes
1982	Demi-Gods and Semi-Devils	Hui-juk	
1983	Mad, Mad 83	FBI member	guest star
1984	New Tales of the Flying Fox	Wu Fei	
1986	Who's the Crook	Wong Wah	
1988	It's No Heaven		
1989	Fury of a Tiger	Mak See	
1989	Leng Nui Ying Hung		guest star
1989	In the Line of Fire		guest star
1991	The Tigers	Ben	
1992	Twilight of the Forbidden City	Wu Ching-chung	
1994	Drunken Master II	Fishmonger Tsan	
2001	We're No Heroes		guest star
2002	Golden Chicken	Richard	
2003	City of SARS	Hospital superintendent	
2003	Golden Chicken 2	Richard	
2004	In Laws, Out Laws		
2005	Wait 'til You're Older	Chan Man	
2007	Brothers	Ghostie	
2008	Pretty to Think So	Man in suit	
2009	Vengeance	Python	
2009	Turning Point	Senior Inspector Poon Man-kei	
2011	I Love Hong Kong	Fish Ball Wah	Cameo appearance
2011	Life Without Principle	Fiery Sam	Cameo appearance
2012	Lan Kwai Fong 2		guest star
2013	7 Assassins	Tit Wan	
2016	Good Take, Too!		
2017	Shock Wave	Officer Chow	
2017	Chasing the Dragon	Officer Jan	

=== Television ===
Year	Title	Role	Notes
1980	Mystery Beyond (Season 4)		
1980	The Bund		
1980	The Broken Thread		
1980	Family		
1980	The Bund III		
1980	The Shell Game		
1981	The Misadventure of Zoo	Pat Tsan-bong	
1981	The Lonely Hunter	Lee Tong	
1981	Come Rain, Come Shine	Lo Hak-yip	
1981	Master Fat Shan-chan	Lee Man-mau	
1981	Summer of 1981	Yip Kar-sing	
1981	The Young Heroes of Shaolin	Kin-lung Emperor	
1982	Demi-Gods and Semi-Devils	Hui-juk	
1982	The Roller Coaster	Wong King	
1982	The Wild Bunch	Lee Chuen-hau	
1982	Soldier of Fortune	Wai Lok	
1983	The Legend of the Condor Heroes: The Iron-Blooded Loyalists	Kwok Ching	
1983	The Legend of the Condor Heroes: Eastern Heretic and Western Venom	Kwok Ching	
1983	The Legend of the Condor Heroes: The Duel on Mount Hua	Kwok Ching	
1983	In the Game Boat	Kwok Chiu	
1984	The Foundation	Kong Fung	
1984	Pao Ching-tin: Law Enforcer	Chin Chiu	
1984	Can Anybody Help	Chow Yun	
1984	Young Detective	Wong Kwok-hon	
1984	It Takes All Kinds	Tong Kar-kit	
1985	The Young Wanderer	Yee Shui-hon	
1985	Sword Stained with Royal Blood	Yuen Sing-chi	
1985	Tough Fight	Wong Hok-kan	
1985	The Yang's Saga	"Ng-long" Yang Yin-tak	
1986	The Brothers Under the Skin	Chan Kwong-ling	
1986	General Father, General Son	Sit Ting-san	
1986	The Ordeal Before the Revolution	Ah-ngau	
1987	The Upstart, the Self-Made Man	Cheung Wai-kin	
1987	The Grand Canal	Lee Mat	
1987	Genghis Khan	Jamukha	
1988	Twilight of a Nation	Yeung Shau-ching	
1988	Kay Moon Gwai Guk	Pong Yoon	
1988	It's No Heaven		television film
1988	Bik Cheung Wai Leung	Kam Sau-yee	television film
1989	Looking Back in Anger	Sean Ding Yau-kin / Ding Wing-cheung	
1989	Greed	Sze Man	
1989	Battle of the Heart	Ching Mong-tin	
1990	Kim-mo Tuk-ku Kau-pai	Lam Hong	
1990	Heaven's Retribution	Sung Bong	
1990	Dap Jun Kong Wu Lo	Fong Tin-yeung	television film
1991	The Good, The Ghost, And The Cop	Cheung Chuen-tsik	
1991	All Out of Love	Kong Wai-nam	
1992	The Imperial Wanderer	Fucai Duankang	
1993	Racing Peak	Lee Tai-yau	
1993	The Silver Tycoon	Tuen Chiu-yeung	
1994	Love Cycle	Ng Kwok-sang	
1994	Burden of Proof	Lam Wai-dat	television film
1994	Ching Nam Tsam	Mok Tsan-wah	television film
1995	Justice Pao	Chin Chiu	2 parts
1995	The Criminal Investigator	Sergeant Wong Chi-chung	
1995	Man on The Verge of A Nervous Breakdown	Chan Chi-hung	television film
1995	Another Sky	Lee Siu-chun	television film
1996	The Criminal Investigator II	Senior Inspector Wong Chi-chung	
1996	She Was Married to the Mob	Detective Chung Kar-shun	television film
1996	Unusual Revenge	Fong Jun	television film
1997	Demi-Gods and Semi-Devils	Kiu Fung & Siu Yuen-san	Nominated — TVB Anniversary Award for Best Actor
1998	Secret of the Heart	Kam Shu-sang	
1999	The Flying Fox of Snowy Mountain	Wu Yat-doh	
2000	Time Off	Chow Kar-chuen	Released overseas in 1998
2000	Incurable Traits	Cho Cho	
2000	The Legend of Master Soh	Soh Chan	
2000	Point of No Return	Jiang Qihua	
2001	Kung Fu Master from Guangdong	Wong Kei-ying	
2001	The Pearl King	Wei Antian	
2002	Treasure Raiders	Siu Sap-yat-long	
2002	Law 2002	Dai Ng-leung	
2003	Asian Heroes	Kam Tsun-yiu	
2004	Mystic Detective Files	Ko Dat	
2004	The Dragon Heroes	Dragon King	
2010	Gun Metal Grey	Shek Tung-sing (Stone Sir)	Nominated — TVB Anniversary Award for Best Actor (Top 5)
2015	Beyond the Rainbow	Tam Koon-hung	
2015	Paranormal Mind	Sun Gei Yuen	
