= Paranormal Mind =

- Directed by: Lau Shun-on
- Starring: Felix Wong; Sam Lee; Kelvin Kwan; Grace Huang
- Country of origin: Hong Kong
- Original language: Cantonese
- No. of episodes: 16

Production
- Production location: Hong Kong
- Camera setup: Multi-camera
- Production company: Hong Kong Television Network

Original release
- Release: 3 September – 24 September 2015

Paranormal Mind (Chinese: 開腦儆探) is a 2015 Hong Kong supernatural crime thriller series produced by Hong Kong Television Network. The first episode premiered on 3 September 2015. It is the last series to air for HKTV.

== Plot ==
A supernatural-themed detective series – however the ‘supernatural’ won't be the traditional ghosts and spirits-theme that audiences are used to seeing. Rather, the drama uses ‘super’ scientific concepts as well as realistic methods to investigate a variety of mysterious, unusual cases. The series will revolve around the main character Sun Gei Yuen (Felix Wong) -- a former high-ranking police inspector who, after being traumatized by the mysterious death of his son, acquires the hidden ability to capture and enter other people's subconscious, as he deeply believes that his son was actually murdered in the ‘inner confines of the subconscious’! At the same time, he starts to display signs of having a split personality and works hard to study about the ‘hidden subconscious’ in the hopes of one day finding his son's killer.

Each main character in this series will have some sort of ‘hidden ability’ that makes them different from other people. Even though each of them will have a ‘regrettable flaw’ and perhaps even be viewed by society as being ‘abnormal’ or ‘weird’, this does not affect their self-esteem. In fact, they are able to turn this ‘regrettable flaw’ into a ‘hidden ability’ and use it to help them solve many mysterious cases.

== Cast ==
- Felix Wong as Sun Gei Yuen
- Sam Lee as Mo Sir
- Kelvin Kwan as Car-Man
- Grace Huang as Madam O
- Anita Chan as Maggie
- Adrian Wong
- Crystal Leung
- Carlos Koo
- Lo Hei-loi
- Lo Hoi-pang as Professor Ko
- Kathy Yuen
- Dominic Lam
- Lam Lei
- Janice Ting
- Bryant Mak
- Cherry Pau

== Release ==
A 10-minute preview was released on HKTV's YouTube channel on 27 August 2015.
