= Summer Snow (film) =

1995 Hong Kong film by Ann Hui

- Film poster
- Simplified Chinese: 女人四十
- Literal meaning: Woman, 40
- Hanyu Pinyin: nǚrén sìshí
- Jyutping: neoi5 jan4-2 sei3 sap6
- Directed by: Ann Hui
- Written by: Man Keung Chan
- Produced by: Ann Hui
- Starring: Roy Chiao; Josephine Siao
- Cinematography: Pin Bing Lee
- Edited by: Yee Shun Wong
- Music by: Otomo Yoshihide
- Production company: Harvest Crown
- Distributed by: Golden Harvest; Media Asia Group; Daiei Motion Picture Company; Toko-Tokuma
- Release date: 4 May 1995
- Running time: 100 minutes
- Country: Hong Kong
- Language: Cantonese
- Box office: HKD 14 million (Hong Kong)

Summer Snow (Chinese: 女人四十, also known as Woman, Forty) is a 1995 Hong Kong comedy-drama film directed by Ann Hui. It stars Josephine Siao and Roy Chiao in leading roles. The film was selected as the Hong Kong entry for the Best Foreign Language Film at the 68th Academy Awards, but was not accepted as a nominee.

== Overview ==
The film's Chinese title (Chinese: 女人四十) literally translates to Woman, 40. Its alternative titles are Loey Yen Sei Seup, or Nuiyan, Seisap.

== Plot ==
Summer Snow tells the story of the relationship between a widower with Alzheimer's disease and his daughter-in-law, May Sun, who is a housewife in her forties trying cope with the upheavals in her family. Her supportive mother-in-law has just died and her husband, who is a driving test examiner, is not giving her support.

== Cast ==
- Josephine Siao as May Sun
- Roy Chiao as Lin Sun
- Law Kar-ying as Bing Sun
- Sin-hung Tam as Ying Sun (Bing's Mother)
- Allen Ting as Allen Sun
- Koon-Lan Law as Lan Sun
- Ha Ping as Mrs. Han
- Shun Lau as Mr. Lo
- Patricia Ching Yee Chong as Carrie Chin (Daughter-In-Law)
- Gin Tsang as Janice
- Ann Hui as Neighbour
- Fai Chow as Bing's Brother
- Stephen Fung as Cannon

== Awards ==
In 1995, Summer Snow won four Golden Horse Awards at the Golden Horse Film Festival and the Prize of the Ecumenical Jury and Silver Berlin Bear at the 45th Berlin International Film Festival. Josephine Siao also won the Silver Bear for Best Actress at Berlin. The following year it won the Grand Prix at the Créteil International Women's Film Festival, several Golden Bauhinia Awards, several Hong Kong Film Awards and the Hong Kong Film Critics Society Awards for Best Actress and Best Film.

1st Golden Bauhinia Awards

- Won: Best Film
- Won: Best Director (Ann Hui)
- Won: Best Actor (Roy Chiao)
- Won: Best Actress (Josephine Siao)
- Won: Best Supporting Actor (Law Kar-Ying)
- Won: Best Screenplay (Chan Man-Keung)

32nd Golden Horse Awards

- Won: Best Film
- Won: Best Actress (Josephine Siao)
- Won: Best Supporting Actor (Law Kar-Ying)
- Won: Best Cinematography (Lee Pin-Bing)
- Nominated: Best Director (Ann Hui)

15th Hong Kong Film Awards

- Won: Best Film
- Won: Best Director (Ann Hui)
- Won: Best Actor (Roy Chiao)
- Won: Best Actress (Josephine Siao)
- Won: Best Supporting Actor (Law Kar-Ying)
- Won: Best Screenplay (Chan Man-Keung)
- Nominated: Best Art Direction (Wong Yank)
- Nominated: Best Film Editing (Wong Yee Shun)
- Nominated: Best New Performer (Allen Ting)
- Nominated: Best Supporting Actress (Law Koon-Lan)

2nd Hong Kong Film Critics Society Awards

- Won: Best Film
- Won: Best Actress (Josephine Siao)

== See also ==
- List of submissions to the 68th Academy Awards for Best Foreign Language Film
- List of Hong Kong submissions for the Academy Award for Best Foreign Language Film

Awards and achievements
Preceded by Vive L'Amour	Golden Horse Awards for Best Film; 1995	Succeeded by In the Heat of the Sun
Preceded by Ashes of Time	Hong Kong Film Critics Society Awards for Best Film; 1995	Succeeded by Comrades, Almost a Love Story
Preceded by Chungking Express	Hong Kong Film Awards for Best Film; 1996	Succeeded by Comrades, Almost a Love Story
Preceded by None	Golden Bauhinia Awards for Best Film; 1996	Succeeded by Comrades, Almost a Love Story
