= The Tigers (film) =

1991 Hong Kong film by Eric Tsang

- Film poster
- Traditional Chinese: 五虎將之決裂
- Simplified Chinese: 五虎将之决裂
- Hanyu Pinyin: Wǔ Hǔ Jiàng Zhī Jué Liè
- Jyutping: Ng5 Fu2 Zeong3 Zi1 Kyut3 Lit6
- Directed by: Eric Tsang
- Written by: Nam Yin; James Yuen
- Produced by: Wallace Cheung
- Starring: Andy Lau; Tony Leung; Felix Wong; Michael Miu; Kent Tong; Bryan Leung; Irene Wan
- Cinematography: Jingle Ma
- Edited by: Kam Ma
- Music by: Tats Lau; Patrick Lui
- Production company: Movie Impact
- Distributed by: Media Asia Entertainment Group
- Release date: 3 July 1991
- Running time: 110 minutes
- Country: Hong Kong
- Language: Cantonese
- Box office: HK$11,399,717

The Tigers is a 1991 Hong Kong action thriller film directed by Eric Tsang, and starring Andy Lau, Tony Leung, Felix Wong, Michael Miu and Kent Tong. The only film starring the Five Tiger Generals of TVB together, it was adapted from the 1984 TVB series, Rise and Fall of a Stand-In, which featured the film's stars Miu and Tong.

The Tigers tells the stories of a team of five Hong Kong detectives. While busting a drug deal the brother-in-law of one of the detectives is found to be implicated and gives them a large amount of cash in exchange for their silence. But with the money comes hassle, as the organised crime syndicate want more and more in exchange for their money, leading to an action packed tale of police corruption.

== Plot ==
Veteran CID inspector Lam Fong-tin of the Royal Hong Kong Police Force leads his squad consisting of sergeants Lau Chi-ming, (nicknamed Thief), Dandruff, Pong and Wah to bust the firearms smuggler Sha-pei. Through interrogation, Sha-pei tips the squad about an upcoming drug trade between triad leaders Wai and Chiuchow Ping. During the operation at the ship yard to bust their deal, Wai is arrested, but Tin is shocked to discover his brother-in-law, Fong Heung-tung, working for Wai. Tung pleads with Tin to let him go and leaves him a briefcase of HK$10 million cash before fleeing by jumping into the water. However, Thief and Dandruff take the money instead of reporting it as evidence and plan to share it with the rest of the squad, but Pong furiously refuses his share due to his upright morals and berates the two. Thief promises to bear full responsibility if anything goes wrong.

Tung pleads with Tin to release Wai, but Tin furiously refuses, so Tung threatens him, knowing the squad took the money. Tin and his squad persuade Pong, who arrested Wai, to give false testimonials in court to release Wai, to which Pong also reluctantly agrees. Afterwards, the squad attempts to negotiate with Tung and return his money, but Tung refuses the money and forces them to collude with him, threatening to report them to the ICAC if they refuse. Tung gives them a tip about another deal between Wai and Ping, hoping to usurp Wai's position. The squad busts the deal where they arrest Ping, but let him go free in a scheme to turn him against Wai and get them both arrested along with Tung.

Ping arrives with his underlings at a disco bar to settle the score with Wai before he reveals to the latter that Tung tipped the police (thanks to information from Tin), as Thief and Dandruff wait nearby to make arrests. Tung manages to kill both Wai and Ping and flees amidst the chaos to the parking lot where Dandruff stops him. However, Dandruff clumsily drops his pistol, which is picked up by Tung, and Thief arrives and exchanges fire with Tung, while Dandruff starts his car in order to flee the scene with Thief. Unexpectedly, Tung manages to get in Dandruff's car and shoots the latter dead before fleeing.

Tung calls CID superintendent Cho and reveals the corruption of Tin and the squad to him, but Cho instead shelters his underlings, so Tung threatens to report them to the ICAC. The squad sets up a trap to arrest Tung, who counters and gets Pong arrested by the ICAC. Not long after, Tin, Thief and Wah get arrested and detained by the ICAC as well, while Pong was released without charge. Tung becomes a witness for the ICAC and is under their protection. After 48 hours, Thief and Wah are released, but Tin is officially under investigation by the ICAC. At this time, Tung is also suspected of murder by the police and must give a testimony at the police station where Pong beats him to a pulp. While the ICAC escort Tung out of the police station, Thief, armed with a blade, attempts to murder Tung, but fails and flees with the help of a colleague.

Pong bails Tin out briefly when the latter reconciled with his estranged daughter, Shirley, before being detained again. In order to protect his squad, Tin decides to bear all responsibility for the corruption and hangs himself in his jail cell. After hearing the news of Tin's death, Thief, Pong and Wah are determined to settle the score with Tung at Volvo Hotel, where Tung is staying under the protection of the ICAC. Since Tin died, ICAC investigation team captain Tam tells Tung that the case is closed and will hand him over to the police for the murder of Dandruff. Tung escapes by killing two ICAC officers assigned to protect him, but Thief, Pong and Wah arrive just in time to stop him, ensuing a prolonged chase and a fight at the hotel where Wah is killed after Tung throws him off multiple stories. Eventually, Thief and Pong subdue Tung just as the SDU arrive. Despite the SDU's presence, Thief shoots Tung dead before shooting himself in front of the police, fulfilling the promise that he made at the beginning that he will bear all responsibility.

== Cast ==
- Andy Lau as Lau Chi-ming (劉志明), nicknamed Thief (賊仔), a smart but impulsive and crafty CID sergeant who is one of the Five Tigers who took the money.
- Tony Leung as Dandruff (頭皮), a smart but somewhat clumsy CID sergeant who is one of the Five Tigers. He took the money in order to support his younger brother who is studying in Canada.
- Felix Wong as Pong (阿邦), a righteous CID sergeant and the only one who did not take the money. He is the sole survivor among the five tigers.
- Michael Miu as Wah (華哥), also a righteous CID sergeant and breadwinner of his family. He took money in order to support his wife and son.
- Bryan Leung as Lam Fong-tin (林況天), respectfully referred as Uncle Tin (天叔), a veteran CID inspector and the leader of the Tigers.
- Irene Wan as Shirley, Uncle Tin's estranged daughter and Pong's girlfriend.
- Shing Fui-On as Shing Sha-pei (沙皮), triad member and firearms smuggler.
- Philip Chan as Cho Siu-ping (曹少平), a CID superintendent and the superior officer of the Tigers.
- Yammie Lam as Wah's wife.
- Lo Lieh as Chiuchow Ping (潮洲炳), a drug dealer and Wai's business partner.
- Chen Kuan-tai as Brother Wai (威哥), a triad leader and Tung's boss.
- Kent Tong as Fong Heung-tung (方向東), the main antagonist. He is the brother-in-law of Uncle Tin and an ambitious and nasty triad who blackmails the Tigers.
- Eric Tsang as a SDU member (cameo).

== Theme song ==
- Yu Gu Du Zai Ben Wang 與孤獨在奔往
  - Composed by: Lau Yi Tat
  - Lyrics by: Andy Lau
  - Arranged by: Lau Yi Tat
  - Performed by Andy Lau
