= The Adventurer's =

Television series

- Starring: Deborah Lee; Simon Yam; Angie Chiu; Kent Tong
- Opening theme: "衝擊" (The Adventurer's) by Jenny Tseng
- Ending theme: "情債" (The Sentimental Debts) by Jenny Tseng
- Country of origin: Hong Kong
- Original language: Cantonese
- No. of episodes: 45

Production
- Running time: 45 minutes

Original release
- Network: TVB
- Release: November 24, 1980 – January 30, 1981

The Adventurer's (衝擊) is a TVB television series, premiered in 1980. Its theme song "The Adventurer's" (衝擊) and the sub theme song "The Sentimental Debts" (情債) had both composition and arrangement by Joseph Koo, while the lyricist was Wong Jim.

== Cast ==
- Deborah Lee
- Simon Yam
- Angie Chiu
- Kent Tong
- Michael Miu
- KK Cheung
