= Proud and Confident =

1989 Hong Kong film by King Lee

- Film poster
- Traditional Chinese: 傲氣雄鷹
- Simplified Chinese: 傲气雄鹰
- Hanyu Pinyin: Ào Qì Xióng Yīng
- Jyutping: Ngou6 Hei3 Hung4 Jing1
- Directed by: King Lee
- Screenplay by: Johnny Lee
- Produced by: Charles Heung; Billy Chan
- Starring: Andy Lau; Rosamund Kwan; Michael Miu; Dick Wei; David Lam; Francis Ng
- Cinematography: Wingo Chan
- Edited by: Kwok Ting-hung
- Music by: Lowell Lo
- Production company: Samico Films
- Distributed by: Wa Hin Films
- Release date: 5 April 1989
- Running time: 90 minutes
- Country: Hong Kong
- Language: Cantonese
- Box office: HK$10,127,069

Proud and Confident is a 1989 Hong Kong action film directed by King Lee and starring Andy Lau as an overconfident, elite police inspector and sharpshooter who is recruited to train to become the "Best of the Best" future leader of the Hong Kong Police Force. Along his journey, he goes through mistakes and errors attributed to his ego which learns from and regains his fighting spirit.

The film was released on 5 April 1990.

== Plot ==
The Royal Hong Kong Police Force is preparing for changes in the coming ten years where they will be in charge of the military as well, so they set up a B.O.B. Program, which stands for Best of the Best, where they recruit young elite police inspector to go through intensive training to become the cream of the crop in the force. Inspector Lee Kin-wah (Andy Lau), an ace marksman, writes a self-recommendation letter to join the program. In an incident where a psycho thinking he is Sun Wukong holds five children hostage at a gas station, Kin-wah manages to take down the psycho despite the risk of causing an explosion. Kin-wah's superior officer, George, reprimands him for his cavalier attitude, but Kin-wah assures he was confident at the scene. George rips up Kin-wah's self-recommendation letter but George's superior officer compliments Kin-wah and tells George to recommend Kin-wah to the B.O.B. Kin-wah enrolls in the B.O.B. with his best friend, Wai (Michael Miu) where they meet other recruits including the muscle-bound Popeye (Dick Wei), and his straight-faced friend, He-Man (Francis Ng), who is not a fan of Kin-wah's overconfidence.

Kin-wah excels at the training exercises at B.O.B. While taking a tactical research class, where he interrupts his instructor, Jennifer Tang (Rosamund Kwan). Jennifer then brings up the gas station incident where Wah boasts his confidence during the situation, but she rebuts he was not 100% he would make the shot. Despite so, he attempts to court her. Later during a training exercise, where two teams including Kin-wah and Wai in one and Popeye and He-Man in the other, the former team wins but everyone was reprimanded by their head instructor, Chiu (David Lam), as neither team played fair. Jennifer later briefs the B.O.B. about the international crime syndicate, I.B.S., which consists of former Vietnam War soldiers has expanded their activities to Hong Kong and their destructive power is Grade A according to the International Security Measures, while the Hong Kong Police is only on Grade C. However, Kin-wah rebukes her that these ex-soldiers are specialized in guerilla warfare while Hong Kong is a big city Without jungles and believes the B.O.B. can take them down as long as they are confident, winning the applause of his teammates. After class, Jennifer tells Kin-wah he is becoming to proud and is not properly prepared to take on the I.B.S. and admits she worries for him, and they start dating afterwards.

Chiu leads the B.O.B. takes part in an operation to rescue hostages kidnapped by Vietnamese criminals believed to the I.B.S. members. However, the hostages are scattered in four different rooms in an abandoned building making it difficult to ensure all the hostages' safety so Kin-wah suggests he take out the criminals in two of the rooms by himself in order to not alert the other criminals, who are then taken out by the rest the B.O.B. team. The B.O.B. celebrate their success with the operation where Kin-wah and He-Man also make up their differences. However, Chiu later informs them those Vietnamese kidnappers were not I.B.S. members and the actual I.B.S. is planning the assassinate a politician, Mr. King, who is sailing to China on his yacht and the B.O.B. is assigned to protect him. I.B.S. members fire at Mr. King on his yacht erupting major gunfight. While protecting Mr. King, Kin-wah and Wai encounters an I.B.S. terrorist disguised as a priest who fires at King. Chiu tells Kin-wah to wait for the team to take action, but he defies Chiu's order and chases the terrorist with Wai, who later gets killed by the terrorist. Kin-wah fights the terrorist but is defeated and the latter flees.

Kin-wah suffers a blow from Wai's death and loses his confidence where his performance suffers during training exercises. Chiu then sets a one-on-one training with Kin-wah using real bullets with Chiu playing the role of an I.B.S. terrorist, but Kin-wah fails and doubts the training he took with the B.O.B. Chiu then receives intel of the I.B.S.'s hideout in a village and leads to the B.O.B. to take on them. Chiu separates them into three teams, A Team led by He-Man, B-Team led by Popeye to assault them, while Kin-wah is part of the C Team that stays with Chiu. However, the I.B.S. discovers them and ambushes the A and B Team, firing heavy machine gunfire at them, so Kin-wah asks Chiu to let the C Team back them up. Kin-wah kills several terrorists and is able to remain calm. Chiu then orders Kin-wah to divert the attention of the terrorists in order for the B.O.B. to retreat, but Kin-wah decides to take down the terrorists and kills several more terrorists. While helping his injured teammate, Sing, Kin-wah thinks about Wai as well as reminding himself of his own previous achievements and confidence, and guns down a large number of the terrorists. Kin-wah continues to fight the terrorists despite Chiu's order to retreat and the rest of the B.O.B., including Chiu himself, joins him in taking down the I.B.S. Kin-wah re-encounters the terrorist who killed Wai and shoots a rocket launcher at a fort was standing. He then takes on the terrorist on a hand-to-hand fight and defeats him before blowing him up with a grenade. In the end, the B.O.B. graduate and Kin-wah asks Jennifer to marry him.

== Cast ==
- Andy Lau as Lee Kin-wah (李健華), an extremely confident and arrogant police inspector with exception marksman skills.
- Rosamund Kwan as Chief Inspector Jennifer Tang, the tactical research instructor of the B.O.B. who is a Computer Warfare graduate of the Massachusetts Institution of Technology and also studied Applied Weaponry and Explosives in England on a grant from the police force.
- Michael Miu as Wai (阿偉), Kin-wah's best friend and colleague who is married and has a son.
- Dick Wei as Popeye, a muscle-bound B.O.B. member with great physical strength.
- David Lam as Officer Chiu (趙Sir), the head instructor and superior officer of the B.O.B.
- Francis Ng as He-Man, Popeye's straight-faced, no-nonsense friend who is a B.O.B. member.
- Sunny Fang as Assistant sergeant
- Regina Kent as Sarah, Wai's wife.
- Peter Chan as a psycho who thinks he is Sun Wukong while holding five children hostage at the gas station.
- Wong Wai as George, Kin-wah's superior officer.
- Jacky Heung as Wai's infant son.
- Norman Cheung as a B.O.B. member
- Evergreen Mak as B.O.B. member.
- Eddie Maher as an I.B.S. terrorist who kills Wai.
- Thomas Sin as an I.B.S. terrorist.
- Lam Suet as an I.B.S. terrorist.
- Hung Hung
- Roderick Lam
- Chow Hau-ling
- Cheng Yuk-yin
- So Siu-sing
- Rocky Cheng
- Lai Kim-sing
- Yau Kwok-leung
- So Kwok-leung
- Dick Lau
- Chan Yiu-kwong
- Cheung Kwok-leung
- Kam Shun-pak
- Hung San-nam
- Chun Kwai-po
- Cheung Wing-hon

== Box office ==
The film grossed HK$10,127,069 at the Hong Kong box office during its theatrical run from 5 to 19 April 1989 in Hong Kong.

== See also ==
- Andy Lau filmography
