= Soldier of Fortune (1982 TV series) =

- 香城浪子
- Starring: Felix Wong; Kent Tong; Patricia Chong; Tony Leung
- Opening theme: "心債" (Heart Debt)
- Composer: Joseph Koo
- Country of origin: Hong Kong
- Original language: Cantonese
- No. of episodes: 30

Production
- Running time: 45 minutes (30 episodes)

Original release
- Network: TVB
- Release: 27 September – 5 November 1982

Soldier of Fortune (Chinese: 香城浪子; Jyutping: Hoeng1 Sing4 Long6 Zi2) is a TVB television series, premiered on 27 September 1982. Theme song "Heart Debt" (simplified Chinese: 心债; traditional Chinese: 心債; Jyutping: Sam1 Zaai3) composition and arrangement by Joseph Koo, lyrics by Wong Jim, sung by Anita Mui.

== Cast ==
- Felix Wong
- Kent Tong
- Siu-Fai Cheung
- Patricia Chong - Poon Hiu-ton
- Stephen Chow - Student
- Francis Ng - Student
- Wilson Lam - Student
- Berg Ng - Student
- Tony Leung
