= The Lonely Hunter =

- DVD cover art
- 過客
- Genre: Period drama
- Written by: Chan Yiu-ying
- Starring: Felix Wong; Michael Miu; Carol Cheng; Barbara Chan
- Opening theme: Gwo Hak (過客) by Susanna Kwan
- Composer: Joseph Koo
- Country of origin: Hong Kong
- Original language: Cantonese
- No. of episodes: 25

Production
- Executive producer: Lee Tim-shing
- Production location: Hong Kong
- Camera setup: Multi camera
- Running time: 42 minutes (each)
- Production company: TVB

Original release
- Network: TVB Jade
- Release: 9 February – 13 March 1981

The Lonely Hunter (Traditional Chinese: 過客; lit. The Passerby) is a 1981 Hong Kong television drama. Produced by Lee Tim-shing and written by Chan Yiu-ying, The Lonely Hunter is a TVB production.

== Synopsis ==
Lee Tong (Felix Wong) grew up with only one intent in mind: revenge. After his gangster father died in the hands of friends Fang and Fong, Tong was raised by his father's henchman, trained to be a lone assassin. Coming of age, he finally sets his plan into action and kills an underworld boss. Timid driver Au-yeung Gong (Michael Miu) unwittingly witnesses the crime but is too scared to rat out Lee, leading to an unexpected friendship. Gong ends up helping Tong enter the organization, laying the path for Tong's revenge. As time passes, Tong's cold and lonely front begins to fade as he experiences life, love, and friendship for the time, but Gong is slowly transformed from a naive youth to a cold-blooded killer.

== Cast ==
- Felix Wong
- Michael Miu
- Carol Cheng
- Barbara Chan
- Shek Sau
- Liu Kai-chi
- Kwan Hoi-shan
- Yeung Kwan

== See also ==
- List of TVB series (1981)
