= The Dragon Family =

1988 Hong Kong film by Lau Kar-wing

- Film poster
- Traditional Chinese: 龍之家族
- Simplified Chinese: 龙之家族
- Hanyu Pinyin: Lóng Zhī Jiā Zú
- Jyutping: Lung4 Zi1 Gaa1 Zuk6
- Directed by: Lau Kar-wing
- Screenplay by: Eddie Chan; Yuen Kai-chi
- Story by: Wong Jing; Lau Kar-wing; Clarence Yip
- Produced by: Wallace Cheung
- Starring: Andy Lau; Alan Tam; Max Mok
- Cinematography: Jimmy Leung
- Edited by: Wong Wing-ming
- Music by: Joseph Chan
- Production company: Movie Impact
- Distributed by: Media Asia Entertainment Group (Home media)
- Release date: 25 August 1988
- Running time: 88 minutes
- Country: Hong Kong
- Languages: Cantonese; Mandarin
- Box office: HK$14,278,705

The Dragon Family (Chinese: 龍之家族) is a 1988 Hong Kong action film directed by Lau Kar-wing starring Andy Lau, Alan Tam and Max Mok.

== Plot ==
Lung Ying (Ko Chun-hsiung), patriarch of the Lung family and leader of the four Triad families, have decided to stop dealing in drugs and go straight with legitimate business. While the No. 3 and No. 4 of the four families follow suit, White Wolf (Ku Feng), the No. 2 of the four families, continues his illegal dealings and Lung sends his hitman and adopted son, Allan (Alan Tam), to kill Wolf's underling, Golden Teeth Shing, who is in charge of Wolf's drug business, before sending Allan to Taiwan to hide from the police. When Wolf finds out what happened, he is enraged and calls his second in command, Tsui (Norman Chui). At this time, Kui (Ho Ka-kui), Wolf's underling and the accountant of the four families, pleads with Lung to spare him when HK$5 million was lost, but it turns out Kui was colluding with Tsui. Meanwhile, Lung's second son, Ka-yip (Kent Tong), is in debt to Wolf after losing in his casino so Tsui and Kui lures him to help them ship cocaine since he is in charge of Lung's container terminal.

While the Lung family is sending off the fifth and youngest son, Ka-chung (Max Mok), to study medicine in England, Tsui and Kui set a trap on Ka-yip to give Wolf a reason to capture Ka-yip and lures Lung out to a meeting with the other patriarchs of the four families at Wolf's wood factory in Cha Kwo Ling. Lung arrives at Wolf's factory with his bodyguard, Po (Kent Cheng), while his brother-in-law, Sek (Lau Kar-wing), stays in the car. There, Wolf demands Lung to kill Ka-yip on the spot, but Lung stabs himself instead as he believes his son was framed and demands two days to investigate the matter, but Wolf refuses. Kui stirs up the scene but Lung then slaps and accuses him for the HK$5 million. At this time, Lung's eldest son, Ka-wai (Michael Miu), arrives and impulsively enters the factory followed by Sek, and beats some of Wolf's henchmen before Kui takes a knife and holds Lung in the neck, demanding Ka-wai and Sek to take off their pants. Ka-wai then throws his pants at Kui, who struggles with Lung before stabbing the latter in the chest.

At the hospital, Ka-wai beats up Ka-yip for his wrongdoings but Po and Sek break up the fight. In his dying breath, Lung tells his sons not to seek revenge and dies right before his wife (Lisa Chiao Chiao), fourth son Ka-wah (Andy Lau) and Ka-wai's wife (Kara Hui) arrive. Afterwards, Tsui and Kui devise a plan for Wolf to kill the rest of the Triad boss of the families so Wolf can be the head of the four families.

At Lung's funeral, No. 3 and No. 4, along with Sergeant Fung (Stanley Fung), arrive to pay respects before Wolf, Tsui and the rest of his gang arrive and taunt Lung's sons. After Wolf and his gang leaves, the Taoist prayers at the funeral stop their chants before pulling out automatic weapons and massacring the funeral parlour while Wolf's underling, Bill (Shing Fui-On), also enters through the back door and shoots at Lung's corpse before Ka-wai tackles him and stabs him in the neck during a struggle. After killing Bill, Ka-wai dies after getting shot by Wolf's other henchmen. Wolf also shoots and kills Lung's third son, Ka-keung (Cheung Kwok-keung), from the second floor before he is betrayed and killed by Tsui. Ka-wai, Ka-yip, Ka-keung, Wolf, Sek, Ka-wai's wife and the Triad bosses of the families were all killed in the massacre, and Ka-wah and his mother were the only ones to escape but Ka-wah injures his hand and gets shot in his leg and crippled while protecting his mother. Ka-wah and his mother go into hiding living in a boat.

Po picks Ka-chung from the airport and finds out from Sergeant Fung at a roadblock about what happened at the funeral parlour and Po sends Ka-chung to live in a safehouse. The next night, Ka-chung is attacked by Tsui's henchmen and he kills a couple of them and when he was struggling with a henchman trying to stab him, Po arrives just in time to rescue him and kills off the rest of the attackers. Po then drives Ka-chung to the pier to send him off to Taiwan before Po is killed by Tsui's henchmen who crash his car and shoot him.

Ka-chung finds Allan in Taiwan and tells him what happened and they return to Hong Kong after Allan bids farewell to his girlfriend. Back in Hong Kong, Ka-chung and Allan tail Tsui, who is running for district council, taking photos of him hoping to find an opportunity to kill him, before reuniting with Ka-wah, who is working as a pimp to support his mother. However, Ka-chung gets into an argument with Ka-wah when the latter forbids him to seek revenge against their father's wish and the fact that the former is inexperienced in combat. However, Ka-chung proves his skills in a brief scuffle with Ka-wah, who admonishes Ka-chung about the risk of losing their lives while seeking revenge and leaving their kidney disease-ridden mother all by herself. Ka-chung and Allan agree with Ka-wah and Ka-wah leads them to see their mother in the boat only to see her getting burned alive by Tsui's henchmen who set the boat on fire.

After paying respects to their mother in front of her tombstone, Ka-wah, Ka-chung and Allan capture and beat up Kui at a bar and force him to bring them to Tsui. Kui brings the three to Tsui's drug factory, where Ka-chung holds Kui hostage with a shotgun and enters through the front door. Shortly after, a gunfight breaks out while Tsui is doing a drug trade with a foreign buyer on the upper floor. Kui is killed in the chaos and Ka-chung kills a couple of henchmen before Ka-wah and Allan jump in through a window glass and join him to take out the rest of the thugs before heading upstairs for Tsui. As the three reach the upper floor, they are held at gunpoint by Tsui and more henchmen and forced to drop their guns before Ka-wah fires a shotgun hidden in his pants. Ka-wah fights one of Tsui's henchmen, Ka-chung fights Tsui, while Allan fights the foreign drug buyer. After Ka-wah kills the henchman, he helps Ka-chung fight off Tsui before Allan brings in a bottle of alcohol with a flaming piece of fabric. Allan hands the bottle to Ka-chung, who throws it at Tsui, who is set on fire and crashes out the window to his death.

== Cast ==
- Andy Lau as Lung Ka-wah (龍家華), the fourth son of the Lung family who is a skilled fighter.
- Alan Tam as Allan (阿倫), the adopted son of the Lung family who works as the family's hitman.
- Max Mok as Lung Ka-chung (龍家聰), the fifth and youngest son of the Lung family who is a medical major.
- Norman Chui as Tsui (阿徐), Lung Ying's second in command who betrays him and usurps his position.
- Kent Cheng as Uncle Po (肥寶), the bodyguard of the Lung family.
- Kent Tong as Lung Ka-yip (龍家業), the second son of the Lung family who is a compulsive gambler and in charge of the family's container terminal.
- Michael Miu as Lung Ka-wai (龍家偉), the eldest son of the Lung family who is impulsive and reckless.
- Kara Hui as Wai's wife.
- Cheung Kwok-keung as Lung Ka-keung (龍家強), the third son of the Lung family.
- Stanley Fung as Sergeant Fung (緊Sir), a police officer acquainted with the Lung family and accepts bribes from them.
- Ho Ka-kui as Kui (阿駒), White Wolf's henchman and accountant for the four triad families who colludes with Chui.
- Ko Chun-hsiung as Lung Ying (龍英), patriarch of the Lung family and leader of the four triad families.
- Lisa Chiao Chiao as Lung Ying's wife and mother of the five Lung brothers who suffers from kidney disease.
- Ku Feng as White Wolf (白狼), No. 2 of the four triad families.
- Lau Kar-wing as Sek (阿石), Lung Ying's brother in law (younger brother of Ying's wife).
- Shing Fui-On as Bill, Wolf's henchman.
- Lo Hung as Lo Sei (老四), No. 4 of the four triad families and leader of the Shanghainess triad.
- Bak Man-biu as Lo Sam (老三), No. 3 of the four triad families and leader of the Chiuchowness triad.
- Blackie Ko as the driver of red car rescuing Ka-wah.
- Phillip Ko as Tsui's top henchman.
- Tony Tam as Tsui's henchman.
- Ridley Tsui as Tsui's henchman.
- Thomas Sin as Tsui's henchman who was killed by Ka-wah in a scuffle.
- Mai Wai-cheung as Tsui's henchman.
- Lam Foo-wai as Tsui's henchman.
- Dion Lam as Tsui's henchman.
- Paul Wong as Tsui's henchman.
- Fan Chin-hung as Tsui's henchman.
- Jackson Ng as Tsui's henchman.
- Eddie Chan as Tsui's henchman.
- Chang Sing-kwong as Tsui's henchman.
- Sam Hang-San as Tsui's henchman.
- Nick Masters as Tsui's foreign drug buyer.
- Wayne Archer as Tsui's foreign drug buyer.
- Cheung Woon-ting as Allan's girlfriend in Taiwan.
