= Michael Miu =

Hong Kong actor

- 苗僑偉
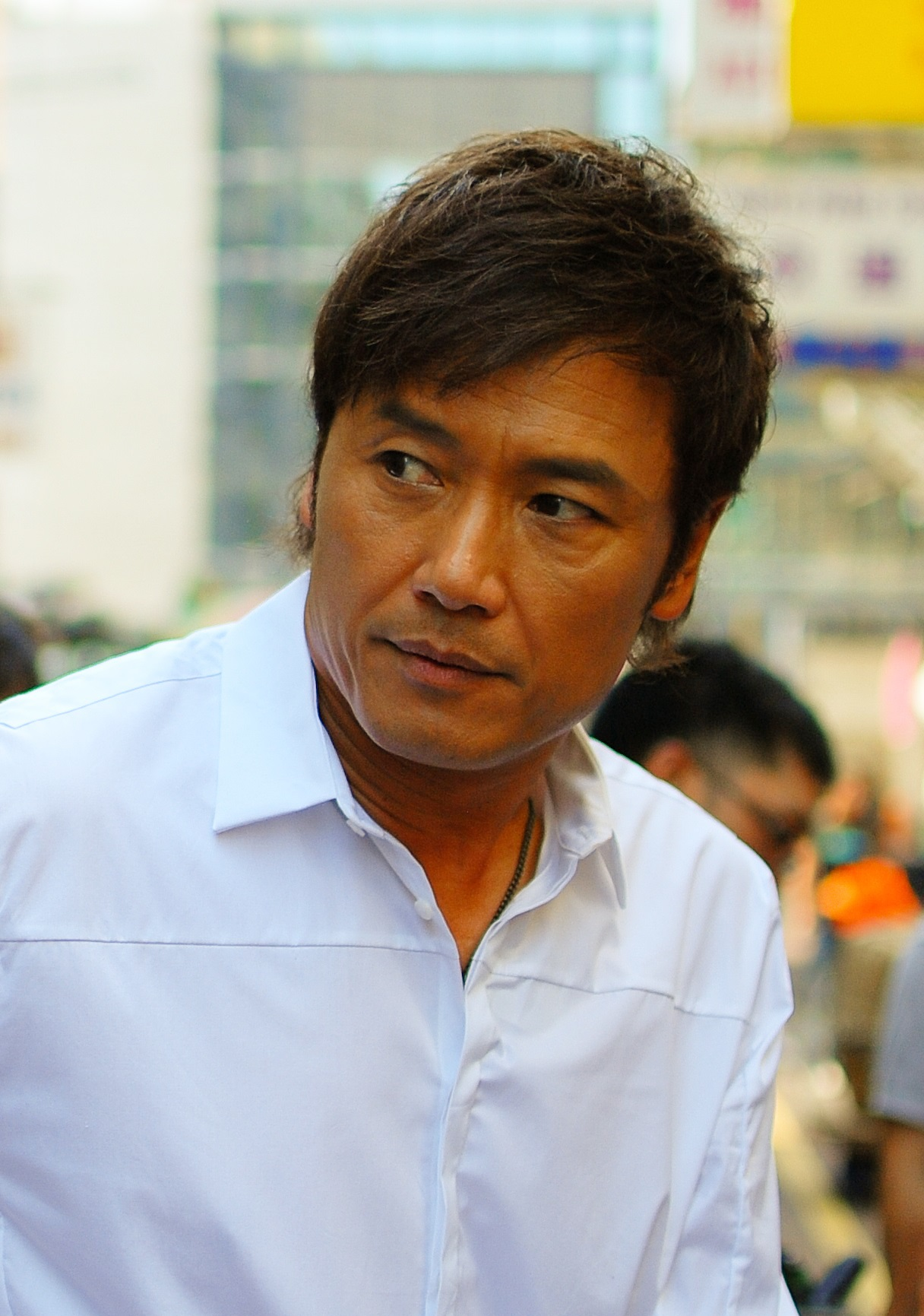
- Miu in 2009
- Born: June 18, 1958 (age 68); Zhoushan, Zhejiang, China
- Other names: Sam Gor (三哥; lit. Third Brother), Ah Miu (阿苗)
- Occupation: Actor
- Years active: 1980–1996, 1999, 2004–present
- Spouse: Jaime Chik (m. 1990)
- Children: Phoebe Miu (daughter) (b. 1991); Murphy Miu (son) (b. 1993)

Chinese name
- Traditional Chinese: 苗僑偉
- Simplified Chinese: 苗侨伟
Transcriptions
Standard Mandarin
- Hanyu Pinyin: Miáo Qiáowěi
Yue: Cantonese
- Jyutping: Miu4 Kiu4-wai5

Michael Miu Kiu-wai (苗僑偉) (born 18 June 1958) is a Hong Kong actor and businessman. His career has been met with popular success in his youth, followed by a resurgence in middle age after a period of hiatus. He is considered one of the most popular Hong Kong actors of the 1980s. Miu is best known for the villainous Yeung Hong in the 1983 television drama The Legend of the Condor Heroes, as well as for The Fearless Duo alongside Barbara Yung. In 1984, The Fearless Duo achieved strong ratings and became the highest-rated drama series of the year, showcasing their on-screen chemistry and widespread popularity at the time.

== Early life ==
Born in Zhoushan, Zhejiang in 1958, Miu and his mother moved to Hong Kong to rejoin his father when he was five. Miu rarely saw his father, a merchant mariner, and was mainly raised by his mother. Near the end of high school, Miu's father was diagnosed with cancer. As a result, he left school and began working as a carpenter to support his family.

== Career ==
Miu was scouted and brought into TVB's Acting Academy in September 1979. While still in training, he made cameo appearances in several major dramas, such as The Bund (1980). Miu's official acting debut was in the 1980 drama The Adventurer's. Immediately after graduating from the Academy, Miu was offered a major role in the 1981 thriller drama The Lonely Hunter, starring alongside his classmate Felix Wong with seniors Carol Cheng and Money Chan.

From 1981 to 1986, Miu together with Tony Leung, Andy Lau, Felix Wong and Kent Tong were promoted as TVB's Five Tigers, a group of five of the most popular young actors in Hong Kong at the time. In 1987, Miu left TVB, and stepped back from the industry to focus on business ventures.

During the 90s, Miu devoted himself to his eyewear business and earned a reputation as a businessman. Due to the reasons of Hong Kong's economic downturn and uncertainty over retail industry in the future, he sold his business, The Optical Centre, in 2002 to Luxottica. His comeback performance was in the 2005 cop drama The Academy, which earned him major recognition and propelled him forward.

Miu starred in the 2014 crime drama Line Walker as Cheuk Hoi and became a strong contender for Best Actor in 2014 TVB Anniversary Awards. He reprised his role in Line Walker: The Prelude won Best Actor in a Leading Role award at the TVB Star Awards Malaysia 2017. In 2020, Miu reprised his role as Cheuk Hoi for the third time in the sequel Line Walker: Bull Fight.

Also, in 2017, he was the narrator for the Hong Kong (Cantonese) version of Planet Earth 2/Heaven and Earth II (天與地II).

In 2020, he made a guest appearance as himself in episode 997 with Michelle Yim as herself on TVB’s sitcom Come Home Love: Lo and Behold as the spokesperson and ribbon cutter.

== Personal life ==
Miu first met Hong Kong actress Jaime Chik in 1981 while shooting for the TVB television drama You Only Live Twice. They began dating but separated a year later. Miu dated Anita Mui briefly in 1983, whom he met on the set of Summer Kisses, Winter Tears. Miu and Chik reconciled, and the couple married in 1990. Miu and Chik have two children - a son, Murphy Miu, and daughter, Phoebe Miu, who is also an actor, both of whom reside in Vancouver, Canada.

== Filmography ==
Film
Year	Film	Role	Notes/Ref.
1985	Twinkle, Twinkle Lucky Stars	Pagoda	
1986	Lucky Stars Go Places	Pagoda	
1987	Scared Stiff	David Miu Tai-wai	
1987	White Cuckooflower	Li Shaonong	
1988	Hero of Tomorrow	Sam Gor	
1988	The Dragon Family	Lung Wai	
1989	Return of the Lucky Stars	Pagoda	
1989	City Cops	Ching Shing	
1989	Proud and Confident		
1989	Little Cop	Thousand-faced Man	
1989	Close Escape	Lam Wai-Tung	
1990	Outlaw Brothers	Sergeant Tai Hwa Wang	
1990	Magic Cop	Sergeant No. 2237	
1991	The Tigers	Wah	
1992	Handsome Siblings	Kuang Yuk Long, Kuang Fung	
1993	Lord of East China Sea		
1995	Whatever Will Be, Will Be	Peter's Dad	
1996	How to Meet the Lucky Stars	Pagoda / Ginseng	
2004	Love Is a Many Stupid Thing 2004	Richard	
2004	Jiang Hu	Figo	
2006	Wo Hu	Superintendent Wai Ting-bong	
2006	McDull, the Alumni	Senior Superintendent of Police	
2007	Brothers	Tam Chung-yiu	
2010	Black Ransom	Sam Ho	
2011	I Love Hong Kong		
2016	New York New York	Mr. Mi	
2016	Good Take (in segment We Are Ghosts)	Falendo (landlord)	
2017	In the Fog	Xing Tianhai	
2018	The Trough	Ching Wan (程昀)	
2019	The White Storm 2 - Drug Lords	Lam Ching-fung	
2024	Crisis Negotiators	Law On-bong	
Television
Year	Title	Role	Notes
1980	The Bund	(extra)	
1980	Yesterday's Glitter	(extra)	
1980	The Invincible Medic	(extra)	
1980	The Adventurer's	Yung Wing-hong	
1981	The Lonely Hunter	Au-yeung Hong	
1981	Come Rain, Come Shine		
1981	Double Fantasies		
1981	The Fate	Wilson Chung Wai-shun	
1981	The Hawk	Prince Har	
1981	The Young Heroes of Shaolin	Wu Wai-kin	
1982	Hong Kong 82	Chow Sing-wai	
1982	Ladies of the House	Little Bat-leung	
1982	A Kid Troupe	Yuen Wai	
1982	You Only Live Twice	Wong Chau-fat/Sheung Tsan-yu	
1982	The Legend of Master So	Ma Kwan	
1983	The Radio Tycoon	Lui Hei	
1983	The Fortune Teller	Lai Bo-yee	
1983	The Legend of the Condor Heroes: The Iron-Blooded Loyalists	Yeung Hong	
1983	The Legend of the Condor Heroes: Eastern Heretic and Western Venom	Yeung Hong	
1983	The Legend of the Condor Heroes: The Duel on Mount Hua	Yeung Hong	
1984	The Foundation	Lee Sai-man	
1984	The Fearless Duo	Szeto Man-mo	
1984	United We Stand	Tung Pang-fei	
1984	The Rise & Fall of a Stand-In	Hung Kiu	
1984	Hero Without Tears	Siu-ko	
1984	The New Adventures of Chor Lau-heung	Chor Lau-heung	
1984	Summer Kisses, Winter Tears	Ling Yue-sam	
1985	Sword Stained with Royal Blood	Ha Suet-yee	
1985	The Condo	San Tin-pui	
1985	The Yang's Saga	"Sei-long" Yang Yin-fai	
1986	The Legend of Dik Ching	Dik Ching	
1986	Pet and Pest	Ko Tai-wai	
1987	The Dragon Sword	Yung Chi-wan	
1988	Two Most Honorable Knights	Kong Fung	
1990	Yuhuo Fenghuang (Fire Phoenix)	Zhong Hao	
1995	New Justice Pao	Sung Ching Wan	
1999	Forrest Cat II	Wong Kar-hei	
2005	The Academy	Sgt. Sunny Lee Man-sing	Nominated — TVB Anniversary Awards for Best Actor (Top 5)
2005	Into Thin Air	Ko Chung-ching	
2006	Au Revoir Shanghai	Nip Jun	Warehoused
2006	Dicey Business	Kiu Ching-chor	
2007	The Academy II: On the First Beat	Sgt. Sunny Lee Man-sing	Guest star
2007	Devil's Disciples	Szema Fei-sing	Guest star
2007	The Drive of Life	Wah Man-shek	Nominated — TVB Anniversary Awards for Best Actor (Top 20); Nominated — TVB Anniversary Awards for My Favourite Male Character (Top 24)
2007	ICAC Investigators 2007	Principal Investigator; Chan Kwok-wai (DJ)	Episode 4: "Over the Line"
2008	Wars of In-Laws II	Himself	Guest star
2008	Love Exchange	Mike Yiu Lap-tin	Nominated — TVB Anniversary Awards for Best Actor (Top 10)
2009	The Academy III: E.U.	Kong Sai-hau	Nominated — TVB Anniversary Awards for Best Actor (Top 15); Nominated — TVB Anniversary Awards for My Favourite Male Character (Top 15)
2010	My Better Half	Ching Sum	
2010	Gun Metal Grey	SIP. Mai On-ting (Mad Sir)	Nominated — TVB Anniversary Awards for Best Actor (Top 15)
2011	Golden branches and jade leaves (金枝玉叶)	Jin Tianqiao (Golden Bridge)	
2012	L'Escargot	Kwan Ka-on	
2012	Highs and Lows	Heung Wing (Gordon)	
2013	A Change of Heart	Fong Chi Lik	
2013	Flower Pinellia (Flower Open in the Middle of Summer)	Cheng Hao	Mainland China Drama on Hunan TV
2014	Line Walker	Cheuk Hoi	
2015	New Way of the Dragon 2015	Do Ying Hou	Mainland China Drama
2017	Positive Youth Energy	Luo Tianming (Luo Xiaochun's father)	Mainland China Drama
2017	The Legend of the Condor Heroes (2017 TV series)	Huang Yaoshi	Mainland China version on Dragon TV
2017	Line Walker: The Prelude	Cheuk Hoi	TVB馬来西亞星光荟萃頒獎典禮2017»-最喜愛TVB男主角/ TVB Star Awards Malaysia 2017: Favourite Leading Actor (Won)
2018	Flying Tiger	Victor Lip Yu Hong	
2018	Guardian Angel 2018 Web Drama	Cheung Tung	
2019	Flying Tiger II	Lok Ka Shing	
2020	Line Walker: Bull Fight	Cheuk Hoi	TVB Anniversary Awards for Best Actor (Top 5)
2020	Come Home Love: Lo and Behold	Guest Star as himself	Appears in episode 997 with Michelle Yim
2021	Pandora's Box 2021 (天目危机)	Shan Qi Da Jing/ Yamazaki Dachang	Mainland China Drama
2021	Flying Tiger 3	Hui Chun-fei	
