= The Foundation (1984 TV series) =

- Starring: Felix Wong; Barbara Yung; Michael Miu; Kent Tong
- Opening theme: "夢裏幾番哀" (In Dream Several Sorrow) by Michelle Pau
- Ending theme: "不見我淚流" (I Cannot See My Tears Flow) by Michelle Pau
- Composer: Joseph Koo
- Country of origin: Hong Kong
- Original language: Cantonese
- No. of episodes: 20

Production
- Running time: 45 minutes (20 episodes)

Original release
- Network: TVB
- Release: February 6 – March 2, 1984

The Foundation (Chinese: 決戰玄武門; lit. 'Decisive Battle of Xuanwu Gates') is a TVB television series, premiered in 1984. Both the main theme song "In Dream Several Sorrow" (夢裏幾番哀) and the sub theme song "I Cannot See My Tears Flow" (不見我淚流) were composed and arranged by Joseph Koo, lyricized by Wong Jim, and sung by Michelle Pau.

== Plot ==
Set in the late reign of Emperor Gaozu of Tang, the Ho Tien Foundation has held the prestigious rank as kong-woo's most formidable clan for years with their rivals in the Wu-Ling church enviously coveting to oust them from their position. Kong Fung (Wong), a country boy desperate to fulfil his late father's dying wish to become the greatest warrior in the realm, leaves behind his lover Sik-Sik (Yung) to join the Ho Tien Foundation. Meanwhile, in a power struggle with his brothers for their father's throne, second prince Li Shimin (Miu) seeks support from exiled general Li Jing (Lau) who helps him recruit aid from the kong-woo where he befriends Kong. With the other princes also turning to kong-woo to recruit talent, the existing rivalries between clans and princes alike are quickly heightened as the factions take sides in their respective struggles. Things become further complicated with Shimin becoming close with Sik-Sik who is taken in by Li Jing's household but whom Kong still has feelings for. As clans battle clans, the princes duel each other, infighting at Ho Tien arise and an interconnected web of love triangles forms, events soon all lead to their respective conclusions in a series of heated showdowns.

== Cast ==
- Felix Wong as Kong Fung, a country boy on a quest to become the greatest warrior in the land, who gets caught up in the various struggles of others throughout the series.
- Barbara Yung as Chun Sik-sik a village girl from Kong's village who becomes the love interest of both Kong and Sai-man.
- Michael Miu as Lee Sai-man, the second prince of the Tang Empire and deposed Crown Prince looking to prevent his unfit elder brother from seizing the throne.
- Kent Tong as Lei Yuen Gat, the third prince of Tang and the most unscrupulous and ruthless of his brothers who sides against Sai-man as a supporter of the first prince.
- Lau Kong as Li Jing (Tang dynasty), a respected veteran and deposed general who is recruited back into politics by Sai-man to oppose the rise of his brothers.
- Bobby Au-Yeung as Li Jiancheng, the first prince of Tang and newly appointed Crown Prince who is selfish and unfit to govern the empire.
- Chu Tit-wo as Sze-Ma Hum, the first disciple of Ho Tien who takes a disliking to Kong and becomes embroiled in a heated rivalry with him for their master's favor and standing in the foundation.
- Kong Ngai as Deacon Ming, the leader of the Wu-Ling church and primary rival to the Ho Tien Foundation who allies with Yuen Gat to undermine them.
- Kwan Hoi-san as Kam Shaotien, leader of the Ho Tien Foundation and master to all its followers.
- Austin Wai as Mang Qingping, an extremely powerful but dishonorable warrior whom both Sai-man and Yuen Gat try to recruit to their respective causes completely oblivious of his secret vendetta to murder their father, the sitting Emperor who had slaughtered Mang's family as a child.
- Chun Wong as Kau Yee Mak Sze Hak, the Lord of Fuyu Kingdom who comes to the Tang mainland to recover a military manual Yik had stolen from him and recruit talent such as Jing to work for his Kingdom.
- Wong Wan-choi as Lee Yik, Jing's estranged younger brother and ex-disciple of Ho Tien with a vendetta to exterminate the foundation to avenge his excommunication.
- Yeung Yim-tong as the second disciple of the Ho Tien Foundation whose more honorable character leads him to eventually side with Kong against Sze-Ma's faction.
- Joseph Lee as Song Quan a warrior working for the Tang court who serves as a bodyguard to the princes and is eventually pulled into the service of the third prince Yuen Gat.
- Lei Yau Wai as Jiang Chet-Chan (also referred to as Madam Li), Li Jing's wife and Fuyu Kingdom native who takes Sik-Sik in and befriends Kau with hopes that her husband can be restored to his former glory as a General.
- Gary Ho as Hou Ming, the first disciple of the Wu Ling church.
- Cheung Ying-choi as Emperor Gaozu of Tang, depicted in the series as an incompetent and disinterested ruler of Tang (unlike his historical counterpart) who is manipulated by the conspiracies of his first and third son into siding against Sai-man whom he deposes for false charges.
- King Toi Yam as Princess Li Lok-Wan (implied to be Princess Pingyang), the naïve full sister of the three princes with an unrequited love for Kong who wishes to stay out of her brothers' feud but is eventually used as an unknowing pawn in their struggle.
- Dorothy Yu Yee Ha as Sit Sheungwan, Mang's love interest and escort at the brothel where he works as security.
- Bak Man-biu as Kong Fung's late father who implores his son to become the greatest warrior in the land with his dying words after he is killed in front of his son during a duel when Kong was still a child.

== Theme songs ==
All sung by Michelle Pau:

- "Sorrows in My Dreams" (夢裏幾番哀), main theme song
- "I Cannot See My Tears Flow" (不見我淚流), sub-theme song
- "Cheerful Today" (今天開心笑), sub-theme song
