= Little Cop =

1989 Hong Kong film by Eric Tsang

- Film poster
- Traditional Chinese: 小小小警察
- Simplified Chinese: 小小小警察
- Hanyu Pinyin: Xiǎo Xiǎo Xiǎo Jǐng Chá
- Jyutping: Siu2 Siu2 Siu2 Ging2 Caat3
- Directed by: Eric Tsang
- Screenplay by: Szeto Cheuk-hon
- Produced by: Eric Tsang
- Starring: Eric Tsang; Natalis Chan
- Cinematography: Andrew Lau; Peter Ngor
- Edited by: Chuen Chi
- Music by: Wai Ming; Richard Lo
- Production company: Children's Town
- Distributed by: Golden Sun Film Distribution Limited
- Release date: 21 September 1989
- Running time: 86 minutes
- Country: Hong Kong
- Language: Cantonese
- Box office: HK$5,710,742

Little Cop is a 1989 Hong Kong comedy film directed by Eric Tsang, starring Tsang and Natalis Chan. The film also features cameo appearances from many Hong Kong celebrities such as Andy Lau, Max Mok, Alan Tam, Anthony Chan, Cheung Kwok-keung, Jacky Cheung and Maggie Cheung.

== Plot ==
Ever since he was a child, Lee Chi-kin (Eric Tsang) has been determined to become a police officer, despite the fact that he comes from a family of criminals. As an adult, he joins the police force, where he is first placed with the Narcotics Bureau. During a drug raid operation, he catches a drug dealer.

He is later transferred, first to the Anti-Porno Bureau where he falls in love with a call girl, then to the Regional Crime Unit where he works under Inspector Chu (Natalis Chan). During a drug raid operation, Lee kills drug lord Ng Cheung. Ng's father hires a killer, Thousand Faces Man (Michael Miu), to take revenge on Lee. After several confrontations, Lee finally brings Thousand Faces Man to justice.

The corrupt director of a mental hospital places Lee in the mental hospital for a year, during which time he develops mental disorders. After being discharged from the hospital, he becomes a restaurant waiter.

== Cast ==
- Eric Tsang as Lee Chi-kin
- Natalis Chan as Inspector Chu
- Andy Lau as Traffic cop
- Max Mok as Mei Yan-xin
- Jacky Cheung as restaurant customer
- Maggie Cheung as restaurant customer
- John Shum as drug dealer
- Stanley Fung as Vice Squad Commander
- Sandra Ng as Inspector Ng
- Billy Lau as Vice Squad Inspector
- Tien Niu as Tin Nau
- Chor Yuen as Mei Qing-yi
- Michael Miu as Thousand Faces Man
- Alan Tam as Head of mental hospital
- Anthony Chan as mental hospital doctor
- Wu Ma as restaurant waiter
- Shing Fui-On as restaurant waiter
- Lo Fan as Ugly prostitute
- Sze Mei-yee as restaurant patron slapped by waiter
- Manfred Wong as restaurant patron punched by waiter
- Sze Kai-keung as restaurant patron that exploded
- Blackie Ko as Yi's henchmen
- Fung Hak-on as Yi's henchmen
- Kent Cheng as Yi's butler
- Richard Ng as Station Inspector
- Cheung Kwok-keung as man who reported himself lost to Station Inspector
- Loletta Lee as air stewardess
- Alfred Cheung as airplane passenger
- Hau Woon-ling as guest at funeral
- Maria Cordero as singer at funeral
- Charlie Cho as Police Commissioner
- Tommy Wong as Jian's robber dad
- Elsie Chan as Jian's primary teacher
- Derek Yee as Narcotic cop
- Yiu Yau-hung as Narcotic cop
- Ng Kwok-kin as cop in station
- Bill Tung as 7-Eleven clerk
- Philip Chan as Rigidity Condom's representative
- Sharla Cheung as Dark Skin
- Liu Wai-hung as Informer at amusement park
- Ram Cheung as singing cop at funeral
- Lawrence Cheng as Representative of Cruelty Against Animal
- Yip Hon-leung as Representative of gangsters in HK
- Lawrence Lau as TV interviewer
- Calvin Choi as singer at funeral
- Edmond So as singer at funeral
- Remus Choi as singer at funeral
- Lo Kin as torturer
- Jane Ha as Lee's mother
- Clarence Fok as Lee's relative
- Yau Yuen-hon
- Norman Chu
- Cho King-man
- Wilson Yip
- So Ching-man
- Peter Ngor
- Andrew Lau
- Kwong Tin-wo
- Wu Shi
- Wong Chi-ming
- Fei Pak
- Dick Cho
- Jaime Chik
- Kwan Ming-yuk

== Box office ==
The film grossed HK $5,710,742 at the Hong Kong box office during its theatrical run from 21 September to 9 October 1989 in Hong Kong.

== See also ==
- Andy Lau filmography
- Jacky Cheung filmography
