= Sword Stained with Royal Blood (1985 TV series) =

1985 Hong Kong television series

- VCD cover
- 碧血劍
- Genre: Wuxia
- Based on: Sword Stained with Royal Blood by Jin Yong
- Starring: Felix Wong; Patricia Chong; Teresa Mo; Michael Miu; Regina Tsang; Rebecca Chan
- Opening theme: "Warm and Cold Feelings" (情冷情熱) by Ken Choi and Amy Chan
- Composer: Joseph Koo
- Country of origin: Hong Kong
- Original language: Cantonese
- No. of episodes: 20

Production
- Producer: Raymond Lee
- Running time: ≈45 minutes per episode

Original release
- Network: TVB
- Release: 25 March – 19 April 1985

Sword Stained with Royal Blood (碧血劍) is a Hong Kong wuxia television series adapted from the novel of the same title by Jin Yong. Spanning 20 episodes, the series was first broadcast on TVB in Hong Kong in 1985.

== Cast ==
- Felix Wong as Yuan Chengzhi
  - Fung Chi-fung as Yuan Chengzhi (child)
- Patricia Chong as Xia Qingqing
- Teresa Mo as Ajiu
- Michael Miu as Xia Xueyi
- Regina Tsang as Wen Yi
- Lawrence Ng as Li Yan
- Rebecca Chan as He Tieshou
- Ko Miu-see as He Hongyao
- Kiki Sheung as Jiao Wan'er
- Ho Pik-sang as An Xiaohui
- Chan Fuk-sang as Sun Zhongjun
- Toi Chi-wai as Min Zihua
- Francis Ng as Luo Liru
- Bobby Au-yeung as Mei Jianhe
- Kwok Fung as Yuzhenzi
- Shih Kien as Mu Renqing
- Lam Tin as Musang
- Kenneth Tsang as Yuan Chonghuan
- Chan Ka-yee as An Daniang
- Lee Hoi-sang as Wen Fangda
- Cho Chai as Wen Fangyi
- So Hon-sang as Wen Fangshan
- Mak Tze-wun as Wen Fangshi
- Cheng Fan-sang as Wen Fangwu
- Tsang Wai-ming as Luo Daqian
- Forest Chan as Ni Hao
- Ngai Wai as Ying Song
- Mak Ho-wai as Zhu Anguo
- Lau Kwok-shing as Yisheng
- Felix Lok as Cao Huachun
- Chu Tit-wo as Li Zicheng
- Amy Wu as Chen Yuanyuan
- Cheung Ying-choi as the Chongzhen Emperor
- Mui Lan as Empress Zhou
- Chun Wong as Tuolong
- Yip Tin-hang as Gui Xinshu
- Leung San as Gui Erniang
- Ho Kwai-lam as Huang Zhen
- Tam Chuen-hing as Jiao Gongli
- Luk Ying-hong as Cheng Qingzhu
- Chan Kwok-kuen as Hong Shenghai
- Leung Siu-tik as Cui Qiushan
- Ng Man-tat as Hong Taiji
- Gam Kwok-wai as Dorgon
- Yeung Yim-tong as Song Xiance
- Michael Tao as Qi Yun'ao
- Tsang Kin-ming as a eunuch
- Lo Kwok-wai as the Chongzhen Emperor's brother
- Fong Kit as Long Delin
- Bak Man-biu as Zu Dashou
- Au Ngok as a fortune teller
