= List of TVB series (1980) =

This is a list of series released by or aired on TVB Jade Channel in 1980.

Airing date	English title (Chinese title)	Number of episodes	Main cast	Theme song (T) Sub-theme song (ST)	Genre	Notes	Official website
21 Jan	This Land Is Mine 風雲	68	Damian Lau, Fung Bo Bo, Cecilia Wong, Simon Yam, George Lam, Ng Man Tat, Kwan Hoi Shan, Lee Hong-kum, Idy Chan		Costume drama		Official website
4 Feb	In Search Of 離別鈎	10	Patrick Tse, Wong Shee Tong, Deborah Lee	T: "難忍別離淚" (Adam Cheng)	Costume drama		Official website
18 Feb	The Salt Lord 鹽梟	15	Maggie Li, Yuen San Wong				
1 Mar	Mother in Law 外母駕到	13	Deanie Ip				
1 Mar	The Bund 上海灘	25	Chiu Chun-keung (producer); Chow Yun-fat, Ray Lui, Angie Chiu, Lau Dan, Kent Tong	T: "上海灘" (Frances Yip)	Period drama	Prequel to 1980's The Bund II	
13 Apr	Easy Come Easy Go 發達容易搵食難	6	Wong Wan Choi, Lisa Lui, Liu Wai Hung		Modern drama		
14 Apr	The Sword 一劍走天涯	10	Ha Yu, Sharon Yeung		Costume drama		
21 Apr	The Brothers 親情	75	Chow Yun-fat, Carol Cheng, Simon Yam, Shirley Yim, Susanna Kwan		Modern drama		
28 Apr	Happy Heroes 歡樂群英	10	Wong Wan Choi, Louise Lee		Modern drama		Official website
12 May	No Biz Like Showbiz 山水有相逢	10	Louise Lee, Melvin Wong		Costume drama		Official website
26 May	Yesterday's Glitter 京華春夢	25	Liza Wang, Damian Lau		Period drama		
21 Jun	Odd Couple 男人之家	13	Adam Cheng, Regina Tsang, David Lo				
30 Jun	Discovery Bay 發現灣	15	Dominic Lam, Susanna Au Yeung	T: "發現灣" (Roman Tam)	Modern drama		
21 Jul	The Invincible Medic 仁者無敵	20	Lo Hoi Pang, Bill Chan, Maggie Li, Flora King, Elaine Chow	T: "仁者無敵" (Jenny Tseng)			
4 Aug	Five Easy Pieces 輪流傳	30	Adam Cheng, Carol Cheng, Louise Lee, Bill Chan				
18 Aug	The Bund II 上海灘續集	20	Ray Lui, Gigi Wong, Patrick Tse	T: "萬般情" (Frances Yip)	Period drama	Sequel to 1980's The Bund. Prequel to 1980's The Bund III.	Official website
8 Sep	New C.I.D. 新CID	15	Yuen San Wong, Philip Chan, Susanna Au-yeung, Dominic Lam		Modern drama		
15 Sep	The Shell Game 千王之王	25	Wong Tin Lam (producer); Wong Jing (story editor); Patrick Tse, Liza Wang, Simon Yam, Peter Yang, Regina Tsang	T: "用愛將心偷" (Liza Wang)	Modern drama	Prequel to 1981's The Shell Game II.	Official website
29 Sep	Don't Look Now 執到寶	15	Stanley Fung, Susanna Au Yeung		Modern drama		
20 Oct	The Broken Thread 亂世兒女	20	Yuen San Wong, Cecilia Wong, Wong Wan Choi, Kent Tong				
20 Oct	Women C.I.D. 雙葉，蝴蝶	15	Deanie Ip, Frances Yip				
10 Nov	Eunuch 龍仇鳳血	10	Cecilia Wong, Yuen San Wong		Costume drama		
5 Nov	The Family 勢不兩立	20	Philip Chan, Carol Cheng, Bill Chan	T: "風霜伴我行" (Teresa Teng)	Modern drama		Official website
24 Nov	The Adventurer's 衝擊	45	Dennis Chiu (producer); Deborah Lee, Simon Yam, Angie Chiu, Kent Tong, Ha Yu, Michael Miu, KK Cheung	T: "衝擊" (Jenny Tseng); ST: "情債" (Jenny Tseng)	Modern drama		
9 Dec	The Bund III 上海灘龍虎鬥	20	Ray Lui, Susanna Au Yeung, Wong Yuen Sun, Elanie Chow	T: "上海灘龍虎鬥" (Frances Yip)	Period drama	Sequel to 1980's The Bund II.	
