= List of TVB series (1981) =

This is a list of series released by or aired on TVB Jade Channel in 1981.

Airing date	English title (Chinese title)	Number of episodes	Main cast	Theme song (T) Sub-theme song (ST)	Genre	Notes	Official website
12 Jan	The Misadventure of Zoo 流氓皇帝	20	Adam Cheng, Louise Lee, Lydia Shum	T: "做人愛自由" (Adam Cheng); ST: "飲勝" (Adam Cheng)	Costume drama		Official website
5 Feb	Love Forever 四季情	25	Liza Wang, Melvin Wong, George Lam, Deanie Ip	T: "四季情" (Liza Wang)	Costume drama		Official website
9 Feb	The Lonely Hunter 過客	25	Lee Tim-sing (producer); Felix Wong, Carol Cheng, Bill Chan, Michael Miu, Barbara Chan		Modern drama		
16 Mar	The Big Boss 龍虎雙霸天	20	Wong Wan Choi, Lau Dan, Maggie Li, Cecilia Wong				
23 Mar	Bloodline 情謎	15	Patrick Tse, Susanna Au Yeung, Kelly Yao				
30 Mar	The Discharged Prisoner 刺青	10	Regina Tsang, Chu Kong				
13 Apr	Come Rain, Come Shine 風雨晴	20	Bill Chan, Felix Wong, Rebecca Chan, Michael Miu, Barbara Chan				
13 Apr	The Shell Game II 千王群英會	20	Patrick Tse, Liza Wang, Chow Yun-fat	T: "千王群英會" (Liza Wang)	Modern drama	Sequel to 1980's The Shell Game.	Official website
11 May	Road to Success 他的一生	20	Simon Yam, Dominic Lam, Leanne Lau, Elanie Chow				
11 May	In Love and War 烽火飛花	20	Adam Cheng, Angie Chiu, Ray Lui, Regina Tsang	T: "烽火飛花" (Adam Cheng)	Modern drama		Official website
8 Jun	My Little Darling 荳芽夢	10	Mary Jean Reimer, Elaine Chow, Rowena Cortes, Dominic Lam				
8 Jun	Double Fantasies 無雙譜	15	Louise Lee, Maggie Li, Kent Tong, KK Cheung				
22 Jun	The Three Musketeers 妙手神偷	20	Stanley Fung, Deborah Lee, Leanne Lau, Simon Yam, Liu Wai Hung	T: "發現灣" (Roman Tam)	Modern drama		Official website
29 Jun	The Fate 火鳳凰	20	Chow Yun-fat, Carol Cheng, Bill Chan, Rebecca Chan, Michael Miu	T: "命運" (Jenny Tseng)			Official website
13 Jul	Kung Fu Master of Fat Shan 佛山贊先生	20	Ray Lui, Felix Wong, Susanna Au Yeung, Sharon Yeung		Costume drama		
27 Jul	Young's Female Warrior 楊門女將	30	Liza Wang, Bill Chan, Ha Yu, Fung Bo Bo	T: "楊門女將" (Liza Wang)	Costume drama		Official website
10 Aug	An Ending to Remember 未了情	20	Deanie Ip, Louise Lee, Henry Yu, Mary Hon				
10 Aug	The Hawk 飛鷹	20	Adam Cheng, Idy Chan, Angie Chiu	T: "飛鷹" (Adam Cheng)	Costume drama		
1 Sep	Summer of '61 紅顏	20	Gigi Wong, Felix Wong, Patrick Tse	T: "紅顏" (Frances Yip)			
28 Sep	The Wheeler Dealer 老虎甩鬚	15	Melvin Wong, Veronica Mudd, Roy Chiao				
5 Oct	Seekers 前路	20	Chow Yun-fat, Patricia Chong, Ray Lui, Kent Tong				
19 Oct	The Young Heroes of Shaolin 英雄出少年	20	Bill Chan, Tung Wai, Michael Miu, Felix Wong, Susanna Au Yeung, Cecilia Wong		Costume drama		
2 Nov	No One Is Innocent 逐個捉	10	Shek Kin, Louise Lee, Carol Cheng, Ha Yu		Modern drama		Official website
16 Nov	The Legend of Wonder Lady 女黑俠木蘭花	20	Angie Chiu, Sharon Yeung, Melvin Wong, Kenneth Tsang		Costume drama		
16 Nov	Brother Four 富貴榮華	20	Adam Cheng, Simon Yam, Liu Kai Ji, Deanie Ip, Rebecca Chan	T: "富貴榮華" (Adam Cheng)			
14 Dec	Break Through 突破	20	Danny Chan, Mary Jean Reimer, Teresa Mo, Patricia Chong, Stanley Fung		Costume drama		
14 Dec	The Good Old Times 鱷魚潭	20	Chow Yun-fat, Carol Cheng, Ray Lui			Copyright notice: 1981 (Eps. 1-14), 1982 (Eps. 15-20).	
