= List of TVB series (1979) =

This is a list of series released by or aired on TVB Jade Channel in 1979.

Airing date	English title (Chinese title)	Number of episodes	Main cast	Theme song (T) Sub-theme song (ST)	Genre	Notes	Official website
6 Jan	Wang String Bridge of the General Assembly 橋王大會串	3			Costume drama		
10 Jan	香港地	13	Lisa Lui, Dorothy Yu				
29 Jan	Over the Rainbow 天虹	85	Patrick Tse, Adam Cheng, Liza Wang, Carol Cheng, Alan Tam, Lau Dan, Kwan Hoi-san	T: "天虹" (Liza Wang)	Modern drama		Official website
1 Feb	The Misfits 貼錯門神	13	Yuen San Wong, Cora Miao, Kwan Hoi-san				
2 Feb	The Landlord 有樓收租	13	Chow Yun-fat, Simon Yam, Annie Liu		Modern drama		
6 Feb	吾家十八口	15	Chu Kong, Gigi Wong				
12 Feb	Cheap Detective 四眼神探	12	Kent Cheng, Ray Lui, Alice Lau		Modern drama		
7 Mar	I'm a Woman 女人三十	13	Lydia Shum, Louise Lee, Cora Miao, Maggie Chan		Modern drama		
30 Apr	Man From Hong Kong 龍潭群英	11	Chow Yun-fat				
3 May	God of Sabre 刀神	12	Damian Lau, Angie Chiu		Costume drama		
4 May	The Flatterers 三跟四傍	11	Chung Chow, Kwok Lo-Hung, Ho Kai Law				
6 May	The Twins 絕代雙驕	17	Bill Chan, Yuen San Wong, Michelle Yim, Cecilia Wong, Idy Chan, Wong Wan Choi		Costume drama		Official website
20 May	Mitsubish Series 左鄰右里	15	Simon Yam				
28 May	Passenger 抉擇	90	Chu Kong, Gigi Wong, Louise Lee, Shih Kien, Susanna Au-yeung, Lisa Lui, Maggie Chan, Wong Wan Choi		Modern drama		Official website
5 Jul	神龍五虎將	9	Fung Bo Bo, Eddie Chan		Costume drama		
7 Jul	Home in Hong Kong 家在香港	19	Deanie Ip, Idy Chan				
20 Jul	He Ain’t Heavy He is My Brother 難兄難弟	7	Adam Cheng				
21 Jul	A Girl with a Suitcase 過埠新娘	7	Carol Cheng, George Lam, Natalis Chan		Modern drama		Official website
1 Aug	Hero Without Tears 英雄無淚	5	Ha Yu, Lau Dan, Mary Hon, Stanley Fung		Costume drama		
3 Sep	Chor Lau-heung 楚留香	65	Adam Cheng, Liza Wang, Louise Lee, Angie Chiu, Kwan Chung, Ng Man Tat, Ha Yu, Cecilia Wong, Susanna Au-yeung		Costume drama		
1 Oct	The Good, the Bad, and the Ugly 網中人	80	Chow Yun-fat, Carol Cheng, Liu Wai Hung, Simon Yam, Susanna Au-yeung, Cora Miao		Modern drama		
3 Dec	The Sword of Romance 名劍風流	45	Ha Yu, Shek Kin, Lau Dan, Angela Pan, Mary Hon, Mandy Wong		Costume drama		
22 Dec	The Couples 不是冤家不聚頭	8	Liza Wang, George Lam, Fung Bo Bo, Bill Chan		Modern drama		Official website
