= Liu Kai-chi filmography =

Listing of film and television appearances by Liu Kai-chi

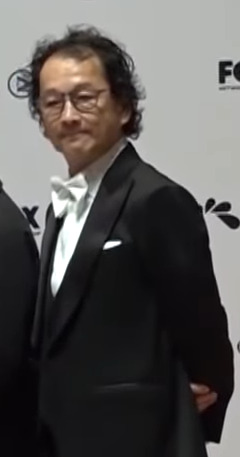
- Film: 74
- Television series: 64

The following is the filmography of Hong Kong actor Liu Kai-chi.

== Television ==
Year	Title	Role	Notes
1979	Chor Lau-heung		
1980	The Bund		
1980	The Bund II		
1981	The Misadventure of Zoo		
1981	The Lonely Hunter		
1982	You Only Live Twice		
1983	The Fortune Teller		
1983	Woman on the Beat		
1985	The General That Never Was		
1985	The Yang's Saga		
1985	The Possessed		
1986	New Heavenly Sword and Dragon Sabre		
1986	Heir to the Throne Is...	Man Tim-fuk / Emperor Wen of Han	
1986	The Ordeal Before The Revolution		
1986	Brothers Under the Skin		
1986	Turn Around and Die		
1987	The Grand Canal	Yueng Yung	
1987	The Legend of the Book and Sword		
1988	Behind Silk Curtains		
1988	The Saga of the Lost Kingdom		
1988	Four of A Kind		
1988	The In-Between		
1988	Withered in the Wind		
1990	The Challenge of Life		
1991	Police on the Road	Inspector Lee	
1992	Vengeance		
1993	The Mystery of the Condor Hero		
1993	Mind Our Own Business		
1993	For Home's Sake		
1994	The Intangible Truth		
1994	Master of Martial Arts		
1994	Fate of the Clairvoyant		
1994	Gentle Reflections		
1995	Justice Pao		
1995	Detective Investigation Files III		
1996	ICAC Investigators 1996	Hung Kwok-chun	Episode 4: The Awakening of the Albatron Dream
1997	The Hitman Chronicles		
1998	ICAC Investigators 1998	Lam Cheuk-sang	Episode 3: The Boss Got Brains
1998	Till When Do Us Part		
1999	Game of Deceit		
1999	The Flying Fox of Snowy Mountain	Ping Ah-say	
1999	Untraceable Evidence II		
1999	Side Beat		
1999	Ultra Protection		
1999	Life For Life		
2000	Ups and Downs		
2000	The Legend of Lady Yang		
2000	Aiming High		
2001	A Step into the Past	Scientist	
2001	A Taste of Love	Chu Cheung Wong	
2001	Virtues of Harmony	Bo Lo To	
2002	Whatever It Takes	Mo Yung Bak	
2002	Good Against Evil		
2003	Survivor's Law	Cheuk Fan	
2003	Witness to a Prosecution II		
2003	The 'W' Files		
2005	Misleading Track	Yan Ming	
2005	The Academy	Hor Sum	
2005	The Herbalist's Manual		
2005	Ten Brothers	Man Sai Hung	
2009	The Winter Melon Tale	Tin Tai Fu/Fan Tung	
2014	The Borderline	To Yat-fei	
2014	The Election	Sung Man-san	
2016	Law dis-Order	KC Lau Kan-cheung	

== Film ==
Year	Title	Role	Notes
1983	Mad Mad 83		
1985	It's a Drink, It's a Bomb	Ronnie	
1988	Figures from Earth	Thin Constable	
1988	Faithfully Yours	Medical Lab Worker	
1989	In the Line of Duty IV	Ming	
1990	Princess Madam	Roger	
1992	Friday Gigolo		
1992	Cageman	Prince Sam	12th Hong Kong Film Awards: Best Supporting Actor
1993	Perfect Exchange	Gold-finger Chi	
1994	Mr. Sardine	Mong	
1994	The Crucifixion	Leung Chi-Wah	
1994	Dragon Chronicles: The Maidens	Sing Hoi	
1999	Moonlight Express	Officer Tung	
1999	Sometimes, Miracles Do Happen		
2001	The Saving Hand		
2001	Funeral March	Duan's brother	
2001	Never Say Goodbye		
2002	Give Them a Chance		
2003	Infernal Affairs II	Uncle John	Nominated - 23rd Hong Kong Film Awards: Best Supporting Actor
2003	Fu bo		
2004	New Police Story	Commander Tai	
2004	Koma	Sergeant Lee Wah-Biu	
2005	Mob Sister	Ah Kau	
2005	SPL: Sha Po Lang	Det. Lok Kwun Wah	Nominated - 26th Hong Kong Film Awards: Best Supporting Actor
2005	Crazy N' the City	Richy	
2005	Colour of the Loyalty		
2005	Dragon Squad		
2006	The Third Eye	Ka-Kei's uncle	
2007	Protégé	Head of Customs Officers	
2007	The Detective	Inspector Fung Chak	
2008	A Decade of Love		
2008	The Moss	Four-eyed Tong	
2008	Ballistic	Ertong	
2008	Beast Stalker	Sun	28th Hong Kong Film Awards: Best Supporting Actor
2008	Lady Cop & Papa Crook	Bowie Cheung	
2009	The Sniper		
2009	To Live and Die in Mongkok	Policeman	
2010	Fire of Conscience	Cheung On	
2010	The Stool Pigeon	Jabber	Nominated - 30th Hong Kong Film Awards: Best Supporting Actor
2011	I Love Hong Kong	Lee Siu-mei	
2011	The Way We Were		
2011	The Detective 2	Inspector Fung Chak	
2011	72 Heroes	Gao Jianfu	
2011	Demon 2		
2011	Datong: The Great Society		
2011	Turning Point 2	Cheuk King Chuen	
2012	The Viral Factor	Man Tin	
2012	The Bullet Vanishes	Boss Ding	Nominated - 32nd Hong Kong Film Awards: Best Supporting Actor
2012	Imperfect	Wang Guodong	
2012	Cross	Mr Yip	
2013	Ip Man: The Final Fight	Lee Yiu-wah	
2013	Christmas Rose		
2014	As the Light Goes Out	Officer Tam	
2014	That Demon Within	Broker	
2014	Horseplay	Officer Wong	
2014	Z Storm	Cheung Keung	
2014	Golden Brother		
2014	I Sell Love		
2015	Guilty		
2015	Imprisoned: Survival Guide for Rich and Prodigal	Prisoner	
2015	Ten Years: Local Egg	Sam	
2016	The Deadly Reclaim	Liu Kap-cheung	
2016	Weeds on Fire	Lu Kwong-fai	Nominated - 36th Hong Kong Film Awards: Best Supporting Actor
2017	Shock Wave	Yim Kwok-wing	
2018	House of the Rising Sons		
2018	Project Gutenberg	Ng Yam	Nominated - 38th Hong Kong Film Awards: Best Supporting Actor
2019	P Storm	Yiu Kwan-ho	
2019	First Class Charge		
2019	Be Water, My Friend		
2020	Declared Legally Dead		
2020	All's Well End's Well 2020		Last film produced within his lifetime.
2021	G Storm	Kwong Yat-long	Posthumous Release
2021	The Attorney		Posthumous Release
2021	Ladies Market		Posthumous Release
2023	One More Chance		Posthumous Release
