= Wong Tai Sin (disambiguation) =

Wong Tai Sin was a Chinese Taoist Deity with the power of healing, popular in Zhejiang, China and Hong Kong.

Wong Tai Sin may mean or refer to:

- Wong Tai Sin, Hong Kong, an area in Hong Kong
- Wong Tai Sin District, a district in Hong Kong
- Wong Tai Sin station, a Hong Kong MTR station
- Wong Tai Sin Temple (Hong Kong)
- Tung Wah Group of Hospitals Wong Tai Sin Hospital, a Hong Kong hospital
- The Legend of Wong Tai Sin, a TVB drama in 1986
