= God of Gamblers III: Back to Shanghai =

1991 Hong Kong film by Wong Jing

- Theatrical poster starring Amber Fang
- Directed by: Wong Jing
- Written by: Wong Jing; Corey Yuen
- Produced by: Jimmy Heung
- Starring: Stephen Chow; Gong Li; Ray Lui; Ng Man-tat; Charles Heung; Sandra Ng
- Cinematography: Peter Pau
- Edited by: Robert Choi
- Music by: Lowell Lo
- Production companies: Win's Entertainment; Samico
- Distributed by: Newport Entertainment
- Release date: 22 August 1991
- Running time: 116 minutes
- Country: Hong Kong
- Language: Cantonese
- Box office: HK$31,363,730

God of Gamblers III: Back to Shanghai
- Traditional Chinese: 賭俠2之上海灘賭聖
- Simplified Chinese: 赌侠2之上海滩赌圣
Transcriptions
Standard Mandarin
- Hanyu Pinyin: Dǔxiá èr Shànghǎi tān Dǔshèng
Yue: Cantonese
- Jyutping: dou2 hap6 ji6 zi1 soeng6 hoi2 taan1 dou2 sing3

God of Gamblers III: Back to Shanghai (Chinese: 賭俠2之上海灘賭聖; lit. Knight of Gamblers II: Shanghai Beach's Saint of Gamblers) is a 1991 Hong Kong comedy film, a sequel to God of Gamblers II (1990). The film is directed by Wong Jing, and stars Stephen Chow and Ng Man-tat. God of Gamblers III continues the story of the Saint of Gamblers (Chow), and does not feature the Knight of Gamblers or the God of Gamblers. The story is about Chow accidentally going back in time to Shanghai in 1937, as he tries to figure out how to return to Hong Kong in 1991.

== Plot ==
After the events in God of Gamblers II, Tai-kun, who lost his ESP powers, has regained the abilities again and seeks revenge against Sing, the Saint of Gamblers. When Tai-kun, aided by his fellow disciples, exerts ESP powers under full force against Sing who is doing likewise to them, the spacetime becomes distorted and sends Tai-kun and Sing to Shanghai in 1937.

Meeting his own grandfather Chow Tai-fook and the benign millionaire Ding Lik, Sing must deal with Ding Lik's foes and the Japanese military forces, with his "mistaken" crush on one of a pair of twin sisters, find out who defeated the French "God of Gamblers", Pierre Cashon, in that era (the mysterious "Comment allez-vous"), and finally find out how to travel back to Hong Kong in 1991 and meet the resurfaced Lady Dream. The movie culminates in a poker battle with Sing and the French God of Gamblers, with the fate of Shanghai in the balance.

== Cast ==
- Stephen Chow as Chow Sing-cho, the "Saint of Gamblers"
- Ng Man-tat as Uncle Tat / Chow Tai-fook
- Gong Li as Miss Yu-san / Yu-mong (Yu-san means "fairy-like" while Yu-mong means "dream-like")
  - Amber Fang as Miss Yu-san / Yu-mong in the Taiwan version
- Sandra Ng as Spring
- Ray Lui as Ding Lik (Lui reprised his role from 1980's TV series of TVB - Shanghai Tan).
- Charles Heung as Lung Ng
- Lung Fong as Wong Kam-kwai
- Sharla Cheung as Yee-mong, Lady Dream (cameo)
- Barry Wong as Commissioner Wong (cameo)
- John Ching as Tai-kun, Devil of Gamblers
- Wong Wan-sze as Yoshiko Kawashima
- Declan Michael Wong as Pierre Cashon
- Wong Jing as H.K. cop

== Production ==
Gong Li was chosen to be the actress for the film but as Taiwan, once of the major markets for Hong Kong films, restricted PRC citizens to appear on domestic screens, two versions of the film were filmed with Taiwanese actress Amber Fang taking over the role. The version with Fang would be for the Taiwan market while Gong's version for the international market.

Filming of the film took three months in Hong Kong with Fang while Gong was stuck in China. Media reports claimed Gong was only able to reach the production set just before production is set to end but remained as rumours.

=== Parodies and references ===
The movie makes use of its cast to make references to other well known Hong Kong media. Barry Wong plays a supporting role as a Police Chief in 1991 Hong Kong, a role he also played in the Chow Yun-fat film, The Killer. Ray Lui plays Ding Lik, a role he also played in the Hong Kong dramatic TV series, The Bund. Lung Fong has a supporting role as a Chinese backer of the Japanese in 1937 Shanghai. His character accidentally kills the main character's love interest by defenestration, an action also performed by his character in the original God of Gamblers, which Stephen Chow's God of Gamblers films were spun off from. Billy Chow plays an unnamed Japanese soldier who is identical in costume and appearance to the character of General Fujita which he played in the Jet Li film Fist of Legend.

=== Title ===
The two titles, Chinese and English, has discrepancies with each other. The English title, however being God of Gamblers III: Back to Shanghai, does not feature the God of Gamblers, played by Chow Yun-fat. The Chinese title is literally translated to Knight of Gamblers II: Shanghai Beach's Saint of Gamblers, but the Knight, played by Andy Lau, is also entirely absent in this film. While the translation refers to Shanghai Beach, it refers to a TVB drama called The Bund in the 1980s, which featured the clash between Shanghainese triads set in the era of the 1930s.

== Release ==
While the international version was released on 22 August 1991, the Taiwan version was only released in Taiwan about a month later. Due to the lifting of the restriction of China's actors, the international version was eventually released in Taiwan one year later.

== Reception ==
The Taiwan version was a box office success and clinched the 9th best box office reception in Taiwan.

As the Taiwan audience watched Fang's version of the film a year earlier, interest in Gong's version which was released one year later in Taiwan, the film suffered in the box office. Also, Gong's had another film, Mary from Beijing, being shown in the cinemas at the same time, resulting in the poor box office for the film.

== See also ==
- God of Gamblers (1989)
- All for the Winner (1990)
- God of Gamblers II (1991)
- God of Gamblers Returns (1994)
