= Justice for All (game show) =

- Genre: Game show
- Presented by: Carol Cheng
- Country of origin: Hong Kong
- No. of seasons: 3

Production
- Production company: TVB

Original release
- Release: April 25, 2005 – July 1, 2006

Justice for All (Chinese: 百法百眾) is a Hong Kong television legal themed game show produced by Television Broadcasts Limited. The show is hosted by Carol Cheng; however, it also invites 3 guests and 2 lawyers to explain the answers. The first season was aired from April 25 to May 29, 2005. The second season was aired from September 19 to October 28, 2005. The third season was aired from May 20 to July 1, 2006.

== Gameplay ==
In every episode, there are 100 participants. The show provides 2 law documents on video, and then asks a question that is related to the video. The participants then have to choose either one of the answers, and so are the invited guests. After that the participants have a chance to correct their answers. One of the lawyers then explains the answers.
