= The Bund II =

Hong Kong TV program

- Genre: Period drama
- Written by: Koo Siu-fung; Leung Kin-cheung; Sam Kwok-wing; Leung Wing-mui; Chan Lai-wah
- Directed by: Chiu Chun-keung; Tam Jui-ming; Lee Yiu-ming; Ng Yat-fan
- Starring: Ray Lui; Gigi Wong; Patrick Tse; Liu Kai-chi
- Opening theme: Man Ban Ching (萬般情) performed by Frances Yip
- Country of origin: Hong Kong
- Original language: Cantonese
- No. of episodes: 20

Production
- Producer: Chiu Chun-keung
- Running time: 45 minutes per episode

Original release
- Network: TVB
- Release: 1980

Related
- The Bund; The Bund III

The Bund II
- Traditional Chinese: 上海灘續集
- Simplified Chinese: 上海滩续集
- Literal meaning: Sequel to The Bund
Transcriptions
Standard Mandarin
- Hanyu Pinyin: Shànghǎi Tān Xùjí
Yue: Cantonese
- Jyutping: Soeng6 Hoi2 Taan1 Zuk6 Zaap6

The Bund II is a Hong Kong period drama television series broadcast on TVB in 1980. It is a direct sequel to The Bund, also produced and released by TVB earlier in the same year. A sequel, The Bund III, was released by TVB later that year. Scenes from the TV show were incorporated into a movie version of the show, which was released in 1983.

== Plot ==
The story continues from after Hui Man-keung's death in The Bund. Hui's best friend, Ting Lik, now controls the Shanghai underworld and he seeks to avenge Hui. Ting sends Chan Cheung-kwai to hunt down those responsible for murdering Hui, leading to a series of killings.

At the same time, Ting is depressed after receiving news that his lover, Ching-ching, has become a nun. He decides to find another girlfriend, whom he has no romantic feelings for, just to cheer his mother up. By coincidence, Ting meets Chu Yin-yin and he falls in love with her. Just as their relationship is developing well, Tik Wan-chi, a gentlemanly and wealthy businessman, appears and starts courting Chu. The three of them are drawn into a complex love triangle.

Tik's immense wealth actually comes from secret financial support by the Japanese. Tik invites Ting to become his business partner and Ting reaps great rewards from their partnership. However, Tik's goal is to pave a path for the Japanese to take control of Shanghai.

Ting eventually learns of Tik's background after cooperating with him for some time. He is also shocked to discover that Tik was the mastermind behind Hui's assassination. Ting enters a dilemma on whether to kill Tik. He intends to kill Tik to avenge his friend and prevent the Japanese from taking over Shanghai. However, he is also hesitant when he sees that Chu truly loves Tik and when he feels that he does not want to lose Tik as a business partner. Eventually, Ting decides to turn against Tik. His decision will stir up big trouble in Shanghai.

== Cast ==
- Ray Lui as Ting Lik (丁力)
- Chow Yun-fat as Hui Man-keung (許文強) (flashback cameo appearance in episode 4)
- Gigi Wong as Chu Yin-yin (朱燕燕)
- Patrick Tse as Tik Wan-chi (狄雲志)
- Liu Kai-chi as Chan Cheung-kwai (陳祥貴)
- Mary Hon as Poon Ling (潘玲)
- Chan Lap-ban as Ting Lik's mother
- Dominic Lam as Kwok Chun-cheung (郭鎮昌)
- Chong Man-ching as Wong Yuet-kei (汪月琪)
- Cheung Kwok-keung as Man Kwok-keung (聞國強)
- King Doi-yum as Kwok Chau-ha (郭秋霞)
- Lo Chun-shun as Cheung (阿張)
- Fung Kwok as Fai (阿輝)
- Lung Tin-sang as Bo (阿保)
- Cheung Sang as Kiu Ying (喬英)
- Yu Ming as Pang Choi (彭才) / Uncle Cheuk (卓伯)
- Tsui Kwong-lam as Fok Kei (霍基)
- Cho Chai as Siu Hung (蕭熊)
- Ma Hing-sang as Boss Ma (馬老闆)
- Leung Oi as Sister Ping (萍姐) / Aunt Ping (平嫂)
- Mui Lan as Sam (阿三)
- Chow Kit as Chairman Ng (伍社長) / Manager Lee (李經理)
- Kwan Kin as Kwok Tso-yin (郭祖賢)
- Wong Man-yee as Miss Shanghai
- Lee Ching-wai as Sister Kam (琴姐)
- Natalis Chan as doctor
- Lin Yin-fai as doctor
- Chan Wing-fai as Lik (力打手) / Chuen (阿全) / bodyguard
- Leung Kit-wah as Kwok Chau-ha's classmate / Mary (瑪莉)
- Hui Yat-wah as Kwok Chau-ha's classmate
- Leung Siu-tik as Robert (羅拔) / gangster Hung (流氓洪)
- Lo Kwok-wai as Wong Yan (王仁) / robber
- Wu Chi-lung as Wong Yung (王勇) / robber
- Chung Chi-keung as Ho Sing (何勝)
- Ye Fung as Tanaka (田中)
- Law Lai-kuen as Secretary Tik (狄秘書)
- Cheung Kwok-keung as Man Kwok-keung (聞國強)
- Michael Miu as Secretary Wong (黃秘書)
- Peggy Lam as Poon Ling's friend / Or (阿娥)
- Man Kit-wun as Poon Ling's friend
- Chan Mei-suen as Poon Ling's friend
- Wong Jo-see as Lau Siu-ching (劉小青)
- Lai Siu-fong as Kwok Chun-cheung's mother
- Ho Kwai-lam as Lui Hon (雷漢) / Pierre
- Mak Tze-wun as gangster
- Bak Lan as Yeung's mother
- Sheung-koon Yuk as Kwok Tso-yin's wife / Kwok Chau-ha's mother
- Leung Suk-yee as Kwok Chau-ha's classmate / student
- Felix Wong as Kei (阿基) / worker
- Chu Kong as guard
- Au Bing-nam as gangster / middle-aged man
- Shek Siu-lun as warehouse guard / committee member So (蘇委員)
- Tsui Kwai-heung as Japanese woman
- Bak Man-biu as Murakami Taro (村上太郎) / village chief
- Yeung Chung-yan as Japanese monk
- Henry Lee as Japanese monk / Manager Au (區經理)
- Chow Ding-yuen as Kwan (阿均)
- Wong Ying-wah as Tak (阿德) / Yan (助手仁)
- Kiu Hung as Inspector Yuen (袁局長)
- Tan Chuen-hing as Tik Wan-chi's henchman
- Mak Tai-shing as famous man
- Yeung Ka-nok as worker
- Chan On-ying as Poon Ling's friend
- Cheung Hei as old man
- Law Kwok-wai as Manager Yau (由司理)
- Chun Wong as Manager Tsang (曾經理)
- Lee Yeung-do as gangster / coolie / student / Sa (阿沙)
- Chan Lin-sin as Kwok Chun-cheung's sister
- Ho Kei-ning as Kwok Chun-cheung's brother
- Lai Bik-kwong as warehouse guard / driver
- Wai Yee-yan as emcee
- Kwong Chor-fai as Lawyer Sam (岑律師) / Manager Sam (岑司理)
- Tsui Yau-lun as Yuen (阿原) / assassin
- Wong Chi-wai as Fei (阿肥)
- So Hon-sang as rickshaw puller / gangster
- Lui Oi-kwan as Yuen San (袁珊)
- Leung Kit-fong as Aunt Man (文嬸)
- Tsang Yuk-ha as dancer
- Siu Siu-ling as dancer
- Law Keung as assassin
- Lok Kung as Mayor Ng (吳市長)
- Cheung Chi-keung as fisherman Kwong (漁民廣)
- Fu Yuk-lan as student
- Pui Wun as aunt
- Yip Ping as aunt
- Mak Yiu-sun as gangster
- So Ping-bo as tipster
- Fong Ping as mamasan
- Lau Siu-ming as lawyer
- Ng Bok-kwan as assassin Hak (殺手克)
- Cheng Fan-sang as assassin Chiu (殺手招)
- Simon Yam as Chin (阿錢)
- Wong See-yan as Secretary Chin (錢秘書)
- Felix Lok as Chung (阿忠)
- Ho Bik-kin as constable
- Law Wai-ping as doctor
- Tsang Wai-ming as coolie Sam (苦力三)
- Benz Hui as driver Ming (車伕銘)
- Law Chun-biu as assassin Wai (殺手羣)
- Ho Kwong-lun as Ting Lik's henchman
- Liu Chun-hung as Tin (阿田)
- Tsui Wai-sun as Kwong (阿光)
