= The Bund III =

1980 Hong Kong TV series

- Genre: Period drama
- Written by: Leung Kin-cheung
- Opening theme: Sheung Hoi Tan Lung Fu Tow (上海灘龍虎鬥) performed by Frances Yip
- Country of origin: Hong Kong
- Original language: Cantonese
- No. of episodes: 20

Production
- Producer: Yau Ka-hung
- Running time: 45 minutes per episode

Original release
- Network: TVB
- Release: 1980 – 1981

Related
- The Bund II

The Bund III
- Traditional Chinese: 上海灘龍虎鬥
- Simplified Chinese: 上海滩龙虎斗
- Literal meaning: The Bund - Battle of the Dragons and Tigers
Transcriptions
Standard Mandarin
- Hanyu Pinyin: Shànghǎi Tān Lónghǔ Dòu
Yue: Cantonese
- Jyutping: Soeng6 Hoi2 Taan1 Lung4 Fu2 Dau3

The Bund III is a Hong Kong period drama television series broadcast on TVB in 1980. The series is a direct sequel to The Bund and The Bund II, which were both released earlier in the same year.

== Plot ==
The story continues from the end of The Bund II and chronicles the final years of Ting Lik's long reign as master of the Shanghai underworld.

== Cast ==
- Ray Lui as Ting Lik
- Susanna Au-yeung as Yip Chau-ying
- Wong Yuen-sun as Kei Sin-yung
- Felix Wong
- Chow Sau-lan
