= Sister Cupid =

1987 Hong Kong film by Guy Lai

- Film poster
- Traditional Chinese: 天賜良緣
- Simplified Chinese: 天赐良缘
- Hanyu Pinyin: Tiān Cì Liáng Yuán
- Jyutping: Tin1 Ci5 Leong4 Jyun4
- Directed by: Guy Lai
- Screenplay by: Joey Cheung
- Produced by: Guy Lai
- Starring: Jacky Cheung; Carol Cheng; Maggie Cheung; Pat Ha; Tang Pik-wan; Natalis Chan
- Edited by: Robert Choi
- Music by: Richard Yuen
- Production company: Always Good Film
- Release date: 16 April 1987
- Running time: 99 minutes
- Country: Hong Kong
- Language: Cantonese
- Box office: HK$11,480,086

Sister Cupid is a 1987 Hong Kong romantic fantasy comedy film produced and directed by Guy Lai and starring Jacky Cheung, Carol Cheng, Maggie Cheung and Pat Ha.

== Plot ==
Kam Yu-yee (Carol Cheng) and Kam Kat-cheung (Jacky Cheung) are siblings orphaned at a young age and were dependent on one another since. Yu-yee is a madame of a nightclub who is dedicated in her job is very loving towards her younger brother although she has never been fond of Kat-cheung's girlfriend, Jackie (Pat Ha), who he had met since childhood. In order to retaliate against Yu-yee, Jackie instigates a plan to elope with Kat-cheung, but they end up in a traffic accident on their way and rolled down a mountain slope where Kat-cheung was rescued by a dead spirit who has entrenched for two decades. Since Jackie failed to elope with Kat-cheung, she moves next door to him instead and calls her cousin, Benjamin (Natalis Chan) to retaliate against Yu-yee, much to the annoyance to Kat-cheung. Aside from battling Jackie, Yu-yee also wishes to seek a breakthrough in her career and spends major efforts pleasing her boss, Big Sister (Tang Pik-wan). Big Sister dearly misses her only daughter, Yuk, who drowned to death twenty years ago and holds a dance party annually to commemorate her. To please her boss, Yu-yee suggests to Big Sister she should plan a ghost marriage for Yuk and Yu-yee is tasked to find a ghost son in-law for Big Sister. As the completion time of her task is getting close, Yu-yee gives her brother's birthday and eight characters of horoscope and a jar of peanut powder posing as bone ashes to Big Sister for the ghost marriage. At the night of the wedding, Kat-cheung unknowingly gets drunk in big sister's mansion and sees Yuk dressed in a wedding dress and having deja vu of meeting Yuk before and spend the night together.

== Cast ==
- Jacky Cheung as Kam Kat-cheung
- Carol Cheng as Madame Kam Yu-yee
- Maggie Cheung as Yuk
- Pat Ha as Jackie
- Tang Pik-wan as Big Sister
- Natalis Chan as Ben
- Tai Po as Sasi
- Fiona Leung as Hostess
- Yik Kon-ha as Hostess
- Lee Ching as Hostess
- Chan Ka-pik as Hostess
- Anna Ng as Hostess
- Anthony Tang as Band member
- David Wu as Band member
- Charlie Cho as Band member
- Yeung Yau-ching as Big Sister's short footman
- Alex Ng as Big Sister's tall footman
- Rico Chu as Yu-yee's facial man

== Music ==
=== Theme song ===
- Lonely Occupation (孤單的佔領)
  - Composer: Richard Yuen
  - Lyricist: Keith Chan
  - Singer: Jacky Cheung

=== Insert theme ===
- The Amorous Mister (公子多情)
  - Composer: Ku Kuk
  - Lyricist: Law Po-sang
  - Singer: Tang Pik-wan

== Reception ==
=== Critical ===
Brns.com rated the film a score of 3.5 out 10 and criticizes its aimless plot, comedy and confusing ending.

=== Box office ===
The film grossed HK$11,480,086 at the Hong Kong box office during its theatrical1 run from 16 to 29 April 1987.

== See also ==
- Jacky Cheung filmography
