= Wong Tai Sin =

Taoist deity

Wong Tai Sin (Huang Daxian)
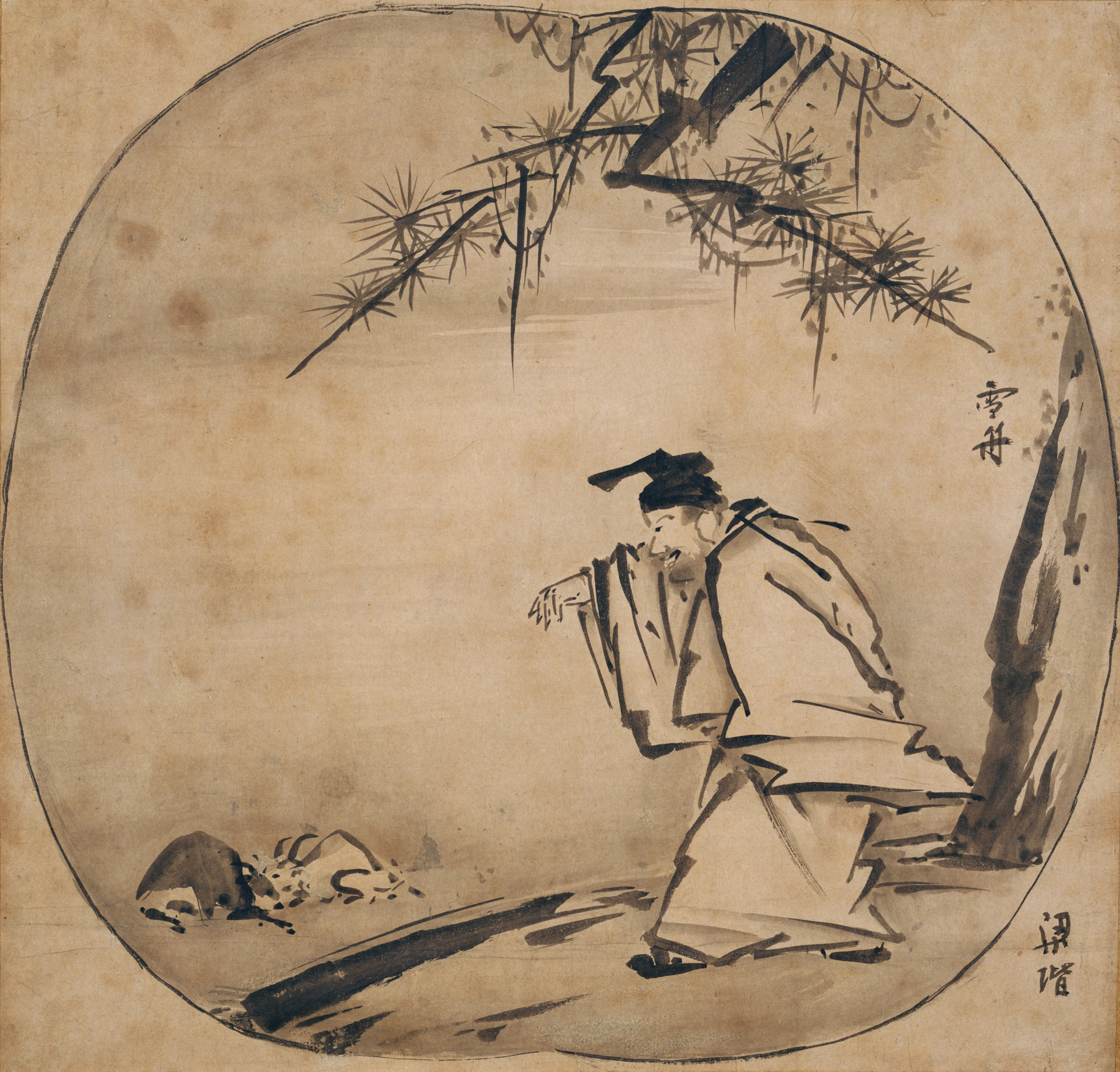
- Huang Chuping, after Liang Kai, by Sesshū
- Born: 328 CE; Lanxi, Zhejiang, China
- Died: 386
- Venerated in: Hong Kong and Jinhua
- Major shrine: Wong Tai Sin Temple

Wong Tai Sin
- Traditional Chinese: 黃大仙
- Simplified Chinese: 黄大仙
Transcriptions
Standard Mandarin
- Hanyu Pinyin: Huáng Dàxiān
Yue: Cantonese
- Yale Romanization: Wòhng daaih sīn
- Jyutping: Wong4 Daai6 Sin1

Wong Tai Sin or Huang Daxian (Chinese: 黃大仙) is a Chinese Taoist deity popular in Jinhua, Zhejiang, and Hong Kong with the power of healing. The name, meaning the "Great Immortal Wong (Huang)", is the divine form of Huang Chuping or Wong Cho Ping (黃初平; c. 328 – c. 386), a Taoist hermit from Jinhua during the Eastern Jin dynasty.

== Legend ==
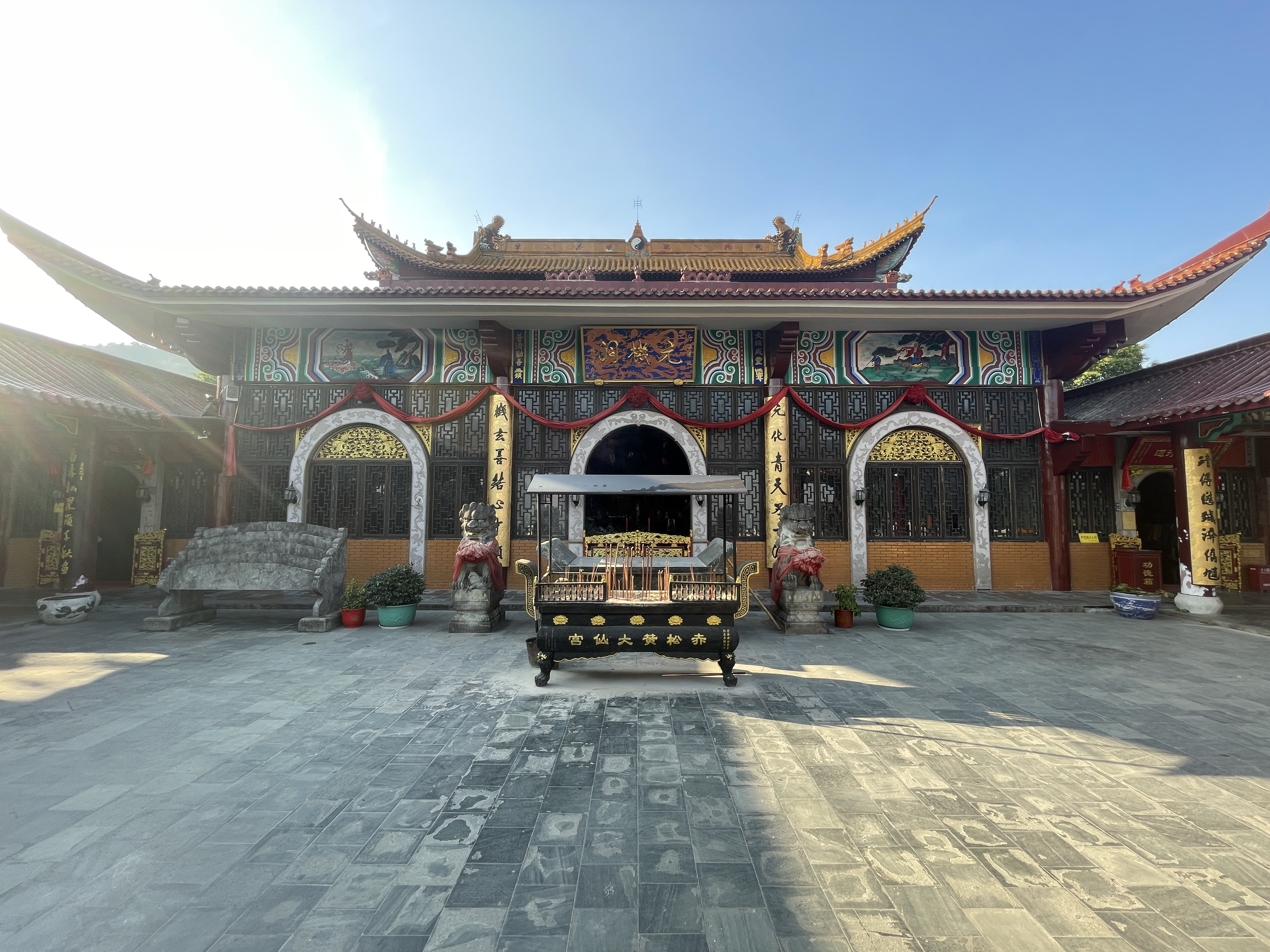
Chisong Huang Daxian Palace in Jinhua

According to the text Self-Description of Chisongzi (赤松子自述; "Master Red Pine"), Wong Tai Sin was born Huang Chuping (Wong Cho Ping in Cantonese) in 328 in Lanxi, Jinhua, Zhejiang province. Western sources have him listed at c. 284 to 364 CE.

Wong Cho Ping is said to have experienced poverty and hunger, becoming a shepherd when he was eight years old. He began practising Taoism at the age of fifteen after meeting an immortal or saintly person on Red Pine Mountain in his hometown. Legend has it that he was able to transform stones into sheep forty years later. Wong Tai Sin later became known as the Red Pine Immortal (赤松仙子), after the mountain where he had his hermitage, and his birthday is celebrated on the 23rd of the eighth lunar month.

== Influence in Hong Kong ==
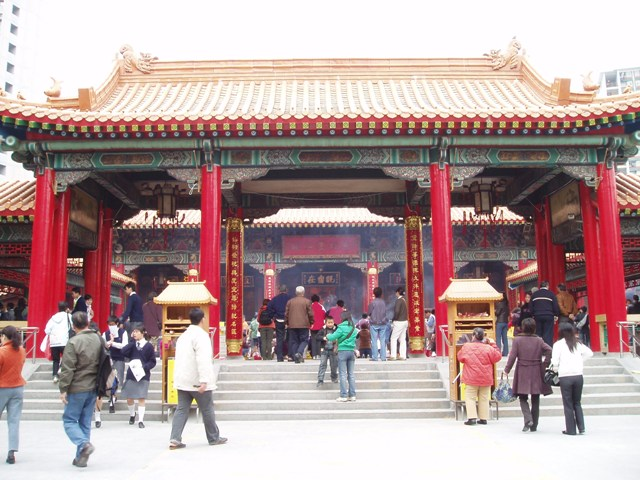
Wong Tai Sin Temple, a popular place of worship in Hong Kong

Today, Sik Sik Yuen is an educational and charitable foundation that, true to Leung's origins as a healer, runs a free clinic and a number of schools and colleges. In Hong Kong, the Wong Tai Sin area and Wong Tai Sin district are named after the deity. There is also one MTR station that is named as Wong Tai Sin station. Many worshippers and tourists from all over the world visit Wong Tai Sin Temple everyday.

== In popular culture ==
- Adam Cheng has the role of the TVB's tv series, The Legend of Wong Tai Sin in the eighties.
- Lam Ching Ying is another role for the movie of TVB's same title in 1992, depicting the life story of Wong Tai Sin.

== See also ==
- Xian (Taoism)
- Shen (Chinese religion)
