= The Good, the Bad and the Ugly (TV series) =

- Promo poster
- 網中人
- Genre: Drama
- Written by: Wong Jing; Ng Ho; To Leung-tai; Tsang Suk-kuen; Tang Wing-hong; Ko Tin-ngok; Chan Lin-sam; Fung Chi-keung; Lee Tang; Hoi Tik
- Directed by: Ng Yun-chuen; Tsui Yu-on; Lai Kin-kwok; Chan Hung-kai; Clarence Fok; Leung Choi-yuen
- Starring: Chow Yun-fat; Carol Cheng; Simon Yam; Susanna Au-yeung; Liu Wai-hung; Lee Tao-hun; Shih Kien; Cora Miao; Wong San; Tang Pik-wan; Kong Ho-oi; Benz Hui; Kwan Hoi-san; Lee Heung-kam; Lung Chi-man
- Opening theme: "網中人" ("The Good, the Bad and the Ugly") by Teresa Cheung
- Composer: Joseph Koo
- Country of origin: Hong Kong
- Original language: Cantonese
- No. of episodes: 80

Production
- Producer: Lee Tim-sing
- Running time: 60 minutes (80 episodes)
- Production company: TVB

Original release
- Network: TVB Jade
- Release: 1 September – 21 December 1979

The Good, the Bad and the Ugly (Chinese: 網中人) is a TVB television series, premiered on 1 September 1979, starring Chow Yun-fat, Carol Cheng, Simon Yam, Susanna Au-yeung and Liu Wai-hung. The theme song, sharing the same name as the series, was composed and arranged by Joseph Koo, with lyrics provided by Tang Wai-hung, and was sung by Teresa Cheung.

== Plot ==
Ching Wai (Chow Yun-fat) is a fresh graduate from university, and is hired by a jewelry company called Yu-Fook, and he rises up the career ladder quickly, due to his superb performance, and he forges a relationship with the Director's daughter, Fong Hei-man (Carol Cheng). The story continues smoothly, until an incident occurs. To pay his mother's (Tang Pik-wan) gambling debts, he embezzles company funds and is reported by the cunning Yuen Kei-cheung (Lee Tao-hung). Ching is sent to prison, where he meets and befriends a gangster chief Lung Koon-sam (Shih Kien), who helps him both in and out of prison. Ching gets a job at another jewelry company, and collaborates with Lung to expose Yuen's wrongdoings. Eventually, Yuen is caught, and Ching proposes to Fong.

Ching Chan (Liu Wai-hung), is also another main character. Known as Ah Chan, he is an idle immigrant from the Mainland. He is forced to care for the Chings when Ching Wai is sent to prison. Unfortunately, Ching Chan commits a crime and is jailed, but manages to forge a family with his love Cheung Mei-po (Kong Ho-oi).

== Impact on vernacular language ==
The show also left a lasting impact on Hong Kong vernacular vocabulary. The term Ah Chan (阿燦), which is a pejorative term for mainland Chinese, traces its origins to this series, from the character Ching Chan.

The term is used to describe new immigrants from the Mainland, seen as lazy, laid-back and idle, unable to adapt to the fast pace of Hong Kong life.

The term only fell out of widespread usage after the 1997 handover.

== Cast ==
- Chow Yun-fat as Ching Wai (程緯)
- Carol Cheng as Fong Hei-man (方希文)
- Simon Yam as Ho Chun (賀雋)
- Susanna Au-yeung as Au Hiu-wah (區曉華)
- Liu Wai Hung as Ching Chan (程燦)
- Lee Tao-hung as Yuen Kei-cheung (阮其昌)
- Shih Kien as Lung Koon-sam (龍冠三)
- Cora Miao as Ho Ying (賀縈)
- Kong Ho-oi as Cheung Mei-po (張美寶)
- Wong San as Ching Chiu (程照)
- Tang Pik-wan as Ng Sau-ying (吳秀英)
- Benz Hui as Chu Pak-keung (朱柏强)
- Kwan Hoi-san as Fong Wai-ho (方維灝)
- Lee Heung-kam as Yeung Hing-wan (楊慶雲)
- Lun Chi-man as Ching Fun (程芬)
