= Heir to the Throne Is... =

1986 Hong Kong wuxia television series

- VCD cover
- 真命天子
- Genre: Wuxia
- Starring: Andy Lau; Yammie Lam; Kathy Chow; Liu Kai-chi; Susanna Au-yeung; Patrick Tse
- Theme music composer: Joseph Koo
- Opening theme: Weave Beautiful Dreams (編織美夢) by Kenny Bee
- Country of origin: Hong Kong
- Original language: Cantonese
- No. of episodes: 20

Production
- Producer: Lee Ting-lun
- Production location: Hong Kong
- Production company: TVB

Original release
- Network: TVB Jade
- Release: 9 June – 4 July 1986

Heir to the Throne Is...
- Traditional Chinese: 真命天子
- Simplified Chinese: 真命天子
- Literal meaning: "The Designated Heir"
Transcriptions
Standard Mandarin
- Hanyu Pinyin: Zhēn Mìng Tiān Zǐ
Yue: Cantonese
- Jyutping: Zan1 Ming6 Tin1 Zi2

Heir to the Throne Is... is a 1986 Hong Kong wuxia television series starring Andy Lau, Yammie Lam, Kathy Chow, Liu Kai-chi, Susanna Au-yeung and Patrick Tse. Produced by TVB, the series ran on its channel Jade from 9 June to 4 July 1986.

== Plot ==
After the death of the Emperor Lau Pong in the early years of the Han dynasty, the imperial court was haunted by the mischief of evildoers attempting to usurp the Lau reign changing it to the Lui reign. Due to constant battles with the Thousand Venom, the Yellowstone Elder (Lau Dan) have been wrangled throughout the years. Although he was able to defeat the Thousand Venom, his inner qi was greatly damaged. Fortunately, Tai-yee Chun-yan enlightens the Yellowstone Elder to the misty peaks where he continues to train his martial arts and inner qi. However, once the Yellowstone Elder arrives to the peak, he gets into trouble due to this hunger for food, Tai-yee Chun-yan punishes him by reducing thirty percent of his martial arts and banishes him to Earth, requiring to commit forty-nine good deeds before the ninth day of October.

Koon Chung-yuen (Andy Lau), a Yamen officer of Weicheng, is childhood friends with Man Tim-fuk (Liu Kai-chi), however, their respective mothers are enemies and opposes their sons' friendship. Coincidentally, Chung-yuen and Tim-fuk happen to rescue Cho Sam (Lee Hoi-sang), a relative the nation's founding father, whom escaped from the imperial court to Mount Jiuhua and therefore, Chung-yuen and Tim-fuk were knocked down into a well by the evil Sam Sik-kei (Sam Kam). Fortunately, they were rescued by a lumberjack, and Chung-yuen subsequently becomes the archaic of Weicheng. Although Cho successfully locates the long-retired Cheung Leung (Patrick Tse) in Mount Jiuhua, he was killed by Sam Sik-kei. Cheung has therefore determined to avenge Cho and re-enter the world. Although Chung-yuen, the newly appointed archaic, was able to escape danger, his fate changes when he is ordered escort thirty young children, which includes Tim-fuk, out the city.

Due to his attempt to avoid the supervision of the Lotus Fairy (Yammie Lam), The Yellowstone Elder meets Chung-yuen. On the other hand, Sam was stroked and wounded by Cheung's "Plough Taiji Palm" and needs to consume the hearts of one hundred children in order for him to heel. However, his plan was ruined by Chung-yuen, Lotus and Yellowstone Elder. After Chung-yuen rescues Tim-fuk, they fail to flee the Enchanted Palace and were stuck there. Chung-yuen also accidentally becomes the bodyguard of the Emperor Lau Kung. There, he informs Lau Kung that Empress Lui Chi (Susanna Au-yeung) was the true murderer of his mother. However, Lau was later killed by Lui, while Chung-yuen and Tim-fuk were hunted down by Lui and the duo flees back to Weicheng. After returning to Weicheng, they realize that their hometown has greatly changed. Although Chung-yuen's position as the archaic was not taken by others, he was banished to the isolated Ching Lung Island. Chung-yuen also gets into an affair with Ching Kan-suet (Michelle Pau), whose true identity was the Princess Lo Yuen, which leads Kan-suet's adopted father Ching Ho (Kwan Hoi-san) to dismiss Chung-yuen's position as the archaic. In order to live, Chung-yuen and Tim-fuk goes up to Mount Jiuhua and studies Zixia Taoism under Cheung Leung.

Due to their monastic insincerity, Chung-yuen and Tim-fuk were only able to learn limited amount of Taoism skills and Cheung abandons them. After returning to Weichang, they managed to help villages expose swindling fortune tellers in town and won the villager's support. The swindler's Wuchen Tao temple were given to Chung-yuen and Tim-fuk, whom change it to a Zixia Tao temple. Zixia Tao elder Ngo Fung (Joseph Lee) meets Chung-yuen and Tim-fuk while working in Weicheng. On the fifth day of August, the Royal Star appears in Weicheng, and Empress Luo sends assassins to kill Empress Dowager Pok (Teresa Ha) and her son who have been living in seclusion for years. While protecting their children, Chung-yuen's mother (Lee Heung-kam) was killed by Lui, while Tim-fuk's mother was laid off a cliff.

Tim-fuk's mother was then rescued by Kan-suet, however she wanted to head to Jingcheng to search for his son, but his father informs the imperial court that she is the true Empress Dowager Pok. After realizing their families were killed, Chung-yuen and Tim-fuk decides to seek revenge. After failing to assassinate Sam, they were rescued by prime minister Chan Ping. The two of them subsequently returns to Mount Jiuhua and concentrate on studying Taoism, and avenge their mothers later. Since Chung-yuen's mother worked as an imperial servant in the past, Chung-yuen mistakenly believed that he is Prince Lau Hang. However, Cheung believes this point can hardly prove that Chung-yuen is Lau Hang, so he asks for assistance to confirm this. In the temple, Chung-yuen begins to train in Wuji Powers, which has only been successfully trained by military strategist Kwai Kuk-chi. However, Chung-yuen was desperate to avenge his mother before he succeeds in practicing Wuji Powers and Tim-fuk quickly followed him afterwards. While rushing down Mount Jiuhua, Chung-yuen encounters Kan-suet and they both were escorted back to Mount Jiuhua by Cheung Leung. Cheung Leung, Chan Ping, Lotus and Yellowstone Elder discovered from Kan-suet that Tim-fuk's mother was the true Empress Dowager Pok and they all believe that Tim-fuk might be the real Prince Lau Hang.

== Cast ==
Note: Some of the characters' names are in Cantonese romanisation.

- Andy Lau as Koon Chung-yuen (管中原)
- Yammie Lam as Lotus Fairy (荷花仙子)
- Kathy Chow as Tau Ching-lin (竇青蓮)
- Liu Kai-chi as Man Tim-fuk (文添福) / Lau Hang, Emperor Hon-man (漢文帝劉恆)
- Susanna Au-yeung as Empress Lui Chi (呂雉)
- Patrick Tse as Cheung Leung (張良)
- Lau Dan as The Yellowstone Elder (黃石老人)
- Michelle Pau as Ching Kan-suet (程近雪) / Princess Lo-yuen (魯元公主)
- Sam Kam as Sam Sik-kei (審食其)
- Lee Hoi-sang as Cho Sam (曹參)
- Lee Heung-kam as Koon Chung-yuen's mother (管母)
- Teresa Ha as Empress Dowager Pok (薄姬)
- Kwan Hoi-san as Ching Ho (程浩)
- Bobby Au-yeung as Kung Suen-yee (公孫義) / Lau Yee, Emperor Hon Hau-siu (漢後少帝劉義)
- Joseph Lee as Ngo Fung (敖楓)
- Wayne Lai as Imperial Chef A (御廚甲)
- Ng Man-tat
- Chu Tit-wo as Kuk Kau-chuen (曲求全)

== See also ==
- Andy Lau filmography
- List of TVB series (1986)
