= The Legend of Wong Tai Sin =

- Genre: Fantasy
- Written by: Cheung Kwok-wing; Chiu Ching-yung; Fong Sai-yin; Cheng Kai-lap; Wong Mei-seung; Long Sau-yan; Lau Ting-kin
- Directed by: Yau Ah-kwai; Benny Chan; Po Tang-chun; Wai Hon-to; Lee Hon-to
- Starring: Adam Cheng; Patrick Tse; Susanna Au-yeung; Sheren Tang; Kitty Lai; Patricia Chong; Rebecca Chan; Mary Hon
- Opening theme: The Illumination of a Thousand World (光照萬世) by Adam Cheng
- Ending theme: Passing with the Wind (隨風而逝) by Adam Cheng
- Composer: Joseph Koo
- Country of origin: Hong Kong
- Original language: Cantonese
- No. of episodes: 18

Production
- Producer: Kam Chi-fai
- Running time: 45 minutes (18 episodes)
- Production company: TVB

Original release
- Network: TVB Jade
- Release: 15 September – 10 October 1986

The Legend of Wong Tai Sin (黃大仙) is a TVB television series premiered in 1986 based on the story of Wong Tai Sin.

== Music ==
Theme song "The Illumination of a Thousand World" (光照萬世) and sub theme song "Passing With the Wind" (隨風而逝) were composed and arranged by Joseph Koo. The lyricist was Tang Wai-hung and performer was Adam Cheng.

== Synopsis ==
Rain god Chisongzi (Adam Cheng) was supposed to take orders from heaven to rain many consecutive months to punish the humans via flood storms. However he could not bear to watch the humans suffer so much. The Jade Emperor then punishes the Rain god by sending him to be reincarnated as a human on earth.

In the Eastern Jin dynasty a fortune teller predicted that the current emperor would be overthrown by someone born on August 23 that year. The emperor ordered all babies born on that date killed. But even after the mass execution, the emperor would continue to have reoccurring nightmares about being assassinated. It turns out his own son, Prince Lung (Patrick Tse) was born on that date and ended up killing him. Lung would bring a lot of troubles to the kingdom in an effort to become the next ruler.

Rain god was now reincarnated as Wong Zo-ping, a miracle doctor and healer who tried to help many people along the way. Later Wong Zo-ping becomes heavenly deity on earth Wong Tai-sin to face off against the corrupt empire. He would eventually become a legendary icon.

== Cast ==
Cast	Role	Description
Adam Cheng	Rain Deity Chisongzi (赤松子)	A Deity controls wind and rain in heaven worked for Jade Emperor. Banish to reincarnated as a human because of he stopping raining that flooded in the human realm to save a large group of humans from any more suffering from the flood.
Adam Cheng	Wong Cho-ping (黃初平)	The reincarnated human form of Chisongzi, a poor peasant who later became miracle healer after face much crisis with help of his four fairies friends from heaven.
Adam Cheng	Wong Tai Sin	A Daoist deity is known for the power of healing which Wong Cho-ping became after face many challenges through his adventure and battle against evil.
Lung Tin-san (龍天燊)	Wong Co-hei (黃初起)	Brother of Wong Cho-ping
Patrick Tse	Prince Lung (飛龍太子)	Next in line for the throne of becoming emperor. His father feared him because of his birthday is a bad omen told by a foreteller which was why he tried to get rid of him. He is Wong Cho-ping's nemesis in the story. He comes into possession of an evil sword and begins a tyrannical rule. Main Villain
Susanna Au-Yeung (歐陽珮珊)	Zi Tin-ziu (指天椒)	Ally of Wong Tai Sin
Pao Fong (鮑方)	Emperor	Fear Prince Lung because of his birthday is a bad omen told by a foreteller. He was murder by Prince Lung for the throne in the beginning of the story.
Rebecca Chan	Princess Soen Soen (雙雙公主)	A foreign princess has a crush on Wong Cho-ping. She died saving Wong Cho-ping when Prince Lung accidentally stab her when she allows Wong Cho-ping escape.
Teresa Mo		Ally of Wong Tai Sin
Sheren Tang	Gu Sou-sou (孤素素)	
Patricia Chong (莊靜而)		
Shih Kien		
Kwan Hoi-san		
Lau Kong		Brother of prince Lung. The current emperor
Mary Hon		
Kitty Lai (黎美嫻)	Cing yi (青兒)	Peasant girl
Hon Ma-lei (韓瑪利)		
Amy Hu (胡美儀)		
Chung Leoi (張雷)		
Jim Ping-hei (詹秉熙)		
Wayne Lai	Court councilor	
Cheung Ying-choi (張英才)		
Bak Man-biu		

== See also ==
- Kau cim
- Wong Tai Sin Temple
