= Cecilia Wong =

Hong Kong actress (born 1956)

- 黃杏秀
- Education: Pui Ching Middle School
- Spouse: Natalis Chan (m. 1979)

Cecilia Wong Hang-sau (Chinese: 黃杏秀), nicknamed "Sau Gu" (Chinese: 秀姑), is a Hong Kong television actress and former artist of TVB. She graduated from the Communication Department of Hong Kong Baptist College and the fourth TVB Artist Training Class. She has played many roles in front of the camera, and is particularly known for Jiang Hu Xia Nu. Her husband is actor Natalis Chan.

== Background ==
Wong's ancestral home is Taishan, Jiangmen City, Guangdong Province. She grew up in Mong Kok, Kowloon, having two older brothers. She attended Hong Kong Pui Ching Primary School (Primary 6, 1967) and Hong Kong Pui Ching Secondary School (Form 5, 1974). She was a classmate of Wong Jing, and her classmates included Willy Tsao Sing Yuen, Monica Tsang (primary school), and Regina Tsang Hing Yue (secondary school). She started learning Chinese dance in primary school grades 4 and 5. Since secondary school, she was sponsored by her brother to study Chinese dance with Nancy Chiu at the Nancy Chiu Ballet Studio in Tsim Sha Tsui, despite her mother's opposition. During middle school, he also participated in the school's Red and Blue Drama Club activities, represented the school to participate in the inter-school recitation festival and won the Hong Kong championship in Mandarin recitation with a selection from "Strange Stories from a Chinese Studio". Wong later enrolled in Hong Kong Baptist College, where he was classmates with Li Kui-ming, Yuan Chi-wai and others.

In 1974, as Wong Jing's sister wanted to join the TV artist training class, Cecilia Wong Hang Sau accompanied her to try to apply, and she was admitted as a student of the TVB's Fourth Artist Training Class. I went to school at Baptist College in the morning and attended artist training classes at Broadcast Channel in the evening. She had already performed dance for TV programs before graduating from the training class. After graduation, he decided to put his studies aside temporarily because he thought he could spend a few years trying his luck in the entertainment industry. Over the years, she became one of the second generation of three stars of the radio vision. The three most popular actresses of the first generation were Liza Wang, Louise Lee and Gigi Wong; the three most popular actresses of the second generation were Cecilia Wong, Carol Cheng and Angie Chiu.

In addition, Cecilia Wong Hang-Sau and Tony Wong Yuen-sun have collaborated many times and are a screen couple of TVB. In 1977, he was selected as one of the "Top Ten TV Stars" by the "Overseas Chinese Evening News" Top Ten Stars Election. In 2014, he participated in the production of the audio book "Good Voice" series by producer Xiao Chaoshun, which provides leisure entertainment for the elderly and people with disabilities through the voice acting of classic books by artists.

== Personal life ==
Wong and Natalis Chan married in 1979. They do not have children.
