= The Bund (TV series) =

1980 Hong Kong television series

- Poster
- Genre: Period drama
- Written by: Koo Siu-fung; Leung Kin-cheung; Leung Wing-wah; Sam Kwok-wing; Leung Wing-mui; Chan Lai-wah; Chan Kiu-ying
- Directed by: Chiu Chun-keung; Fok Yiu-leung; Tam Jui-ming; Lee Yiu-ming; Lau Si-yu
- Starring: Chow Yun-fat; Ray Lui; Angie Chiu; Lau Dan; Lam Kin-ming; Kent Tong; King Doi-yum
- Opening theme: The Bund (上海灘) performed by Frances Yip
- Composer: Joseph Koo
- Country of origin: Hong Kong
- Original language: Cantonese
- No. of episodes: 25

Production
- Producer: Chiu Chun-keung
- Running time: 45 minutes per episode

Original release
- Network: Jade
- Release: 10 March – 11 April 1980

Related
- The Bund II

The Bund
- Traditional Chinese: 上海灘
- Simplified Chinese: 上海滩
- Literal meaning: Shanghai Bund
Transcriptions
Standard Mandarin
- Hanyu Pinyin: Shànghǎi Tān
Yue: Cantonese
- Jyutping: Soeng6 Hoi2 Taan1

The Bund is a 1980 Hong Kong period crime drama television series first broadcast on TVB in 1980. It is praised as "The Godfather of the East" and spawned two sequels, two remakes, and a film adaptation. The theme song, which shares the same Chinese title as the series and was performed by Frances Yip, also became a memorable Cantopop hit.

== Plot ==
The series is set in China in the 1920s. Hui Man-keung, a Yenching University graduate who has served three years in prison for participating in the May Fourth Movement, decides to make a fresh start in Shanghai, where he meets and befriends Ting Lik, a fruit vendor. After becoming the leader of a small gang, he invites Ting to be his partner. At the same time, he builds a good relationship with Fung King-yiu, a wealthy tycoon and gang boss, after saving Fung's daughter Ching-ching from being taken hostage. Fung wants Hui to work for him but Hui declines. Ching-ching falls in love with Hui.

After Ting kills a rival in a dispute over a woman, other gangs attack Hui and Ting and destroy their small gang. Hui and Ting then join Fung's bigger gang for protection. Later, Hui discovers that Fung is collaborating with secret agents from the Japanese right-wing Black Dragon Society to destroy the Chin Woo School, a Chinese martial arts school committed to defending China from foreign aggression. He enters a dilemma on whether to side with Chin Woo School or turn against Fung. Eventually deciding to help the Chin Woo School, Hui kills a Japanese spy, Yamaguchi Kaoriko, in a gunfight. Furious upon learning of Hui's betrayal, Fung sends his men to hunt down and kill Hui. On account of their friendship, Ting secretly helps Hui escape from Shanghai.

Hui fakes his death to evade Fung's men and settles in Hong Kong, where he marries So Wong-tai, starts a new life with her family, and opens a small restaurant. Meanwhile, in Shanghai, Ching-ching is unable to accept the news of Hui's death so she visits Hong Kong when she hears rumours that Hui is still alive there. She meets Hui in Hong Kong but refuses to believe him when he tells her he is already married. Hui then brings her home to show her his family. Unknown to them, Fung's men had secretly followed them and they kill Hui's family while he was out. After learning that Fung's men had murdered his family, Hui swears vengeance on Fung and returns to Shanghai to take his revenge.

Hui becomes an adviser to Nip Yan-wong, Fung's biggest rival. Through many successful manoeuvres, Hui assists Nip in crippling Fung financially and politically. He also tells Ching-ching that they can never be together. During Hui's absence, Ting begins to court Ching-ching. After Ting is seriously injured on one occasion, Ching-ching agrees to marry him. Hui, who has already been deeply affected by the loss of his family, only feels worse after seeing that his ex-lover is about to marry his best friend. Determined to take his revenge against Fung, he seeks help from Ting, who sets Hui and Fung up for a game of Russian roulette. Hui emerges victorious and kills Fung.

Ching-ching is unable to forgive Hui for killing her father and she leaves China for France. Meanwhile, Hui and Ting cooperate and manage to form the most powerful gang in the Shanghai underworld. However, Hui is not interested in gang affairs as he is eager to find Ching-ching and patch up with her. On the night before he leaves for France, Hui is gunned down outside a restaurant by unknown assailants.

== Main cast ==
- Chow Yun-fat as Hui Man-keung (許文強)
- Ray Lui as Ting Lik (丁力)
- Angie Chiu as Fung Ching-ching (馮程程)
- Lau Dan as Fung King-yiu (馮敬堯)
- Kent Tong as Chan Hon-lam (陳翰林)
- King Doi-yum as So Wong-tai (蘇旺娣)
- Susanna Au-yeung as Yamaguchi Kaoriko (山口香子)

== Theme song ==
The series eponymous theme song, The Bund (上海灘) was performed by Frances Yip. It was one of the early collaborations composed by Joseph Koo with the lyrics by Wong Jim. The song would also become one of the top 10 songs awarded in the 1980 RTHK Gold songs awards. Yip gained international fame after the song's release, and it has since become her signature song.

The 1996 film Shanghai Grand released some 16 years later also re-used the same song. This version was performed by Andy Lau.

== DVD release ==
In 2015, TVBI distributed The Bund on 5 DVDs in its original state. Each of the 25 episodes are 45 minutes long. Audio is available in original Cantonese, Mandarin dub, or English dub with Traditional Chinese and Simplified Chinese subtitles, but none in English. However, it is only available in Hong Kong and Macao. On 6 February 2009, TVB released the original series and its two sequels on DVD format. The original series, substantially edited, was previously released on VCD in 2000.

== Cultural references ==
Two scenes have subsequently been replicated and parodied in many films and television series in Hong Kong. The wedding of Ting Lik and Fung Ching-ching was one. The death of Hui Man-keung was another. In particular, Chow Yun-fat was propelled into the limelight and became a household name in Hong Kong. The scene where Hui is assassinated outside a restaurant is culturally considered one of the all-time greatest scenes in Hong Kong television.

== Sequels, remakes and adaptations ==
The series was a phenomenal success throughout Asia and the episodes were subsequently re-edited into two features in 1983. Chow Yun-fat's popularity also increased due to his performance in the series.

Chow Yun-fat's character had died at the end of The Bund so he did not return for the sequel, The Bund II, except for a brief flashback cameo appearance. The identity of Hui's assailants was a central plot point of The Bund II; though the first film hinted at French assailants, the sequel established that Hui was in fact killed by Japanese assailants with the cooperation of a Chinese businessman. Ray Lui continued portraying his character in The Bund II and The Bund III.

In 1996, The Bund was remade into the Hong Kong television series Once Upon a Time in Shanghai, starring Sunny Chan, Gordon Lam and Nadia Chan as the original characters, and Adam Cheng and Carol Cheng as new characters.

The plot of the 1996 Hong Kong film Shanghai Grand, directed by Poon Man-kit and produced by Tsui Hark, is similar to that of The Bund. Leslie Cheung and Andy Lau starred as Hui Man-keung and Ting Lik respectively.

The Bund was remade again in 2007 into a mainland Chinese television series, Shanghai Bund, directed by Gao Xixi. Huang Xiaoming, Susan Sun, Li Xuejian and Huang Haibo starred as the original characters.

In 2016, The Bund was adapted into a mainland Chinese film under the title The Game Changer, directed by Gao Xixi (who also directed the 2007 remake), and starring Huang Zitao and Peter Ho.

== See also ==
- Shanghainese people in Hong Kong
