= Ray Lui =

Vietnamese-Hong Kong actor

Ray Lui 呂良偉
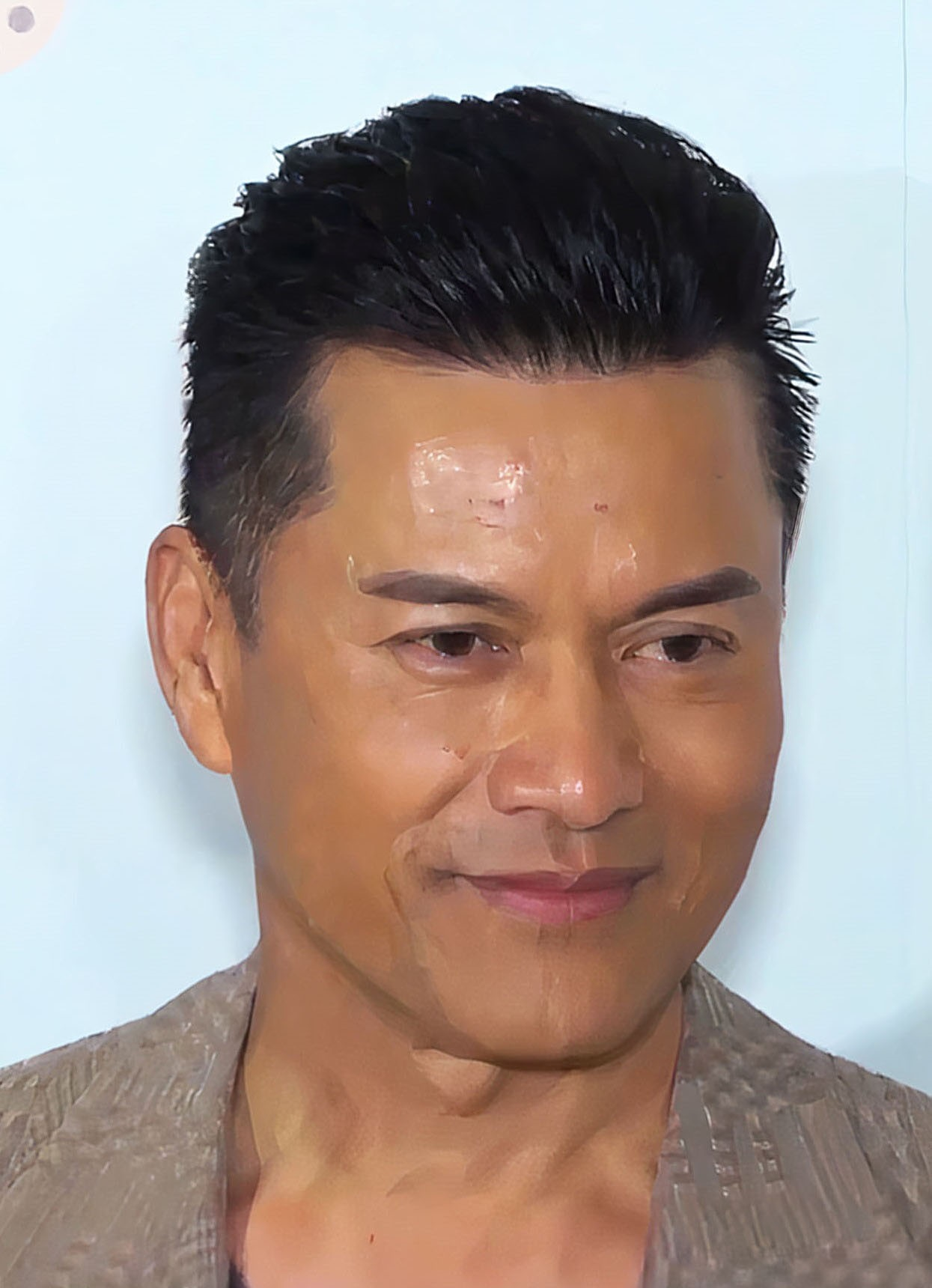
- Born: 22 December 1956 (age 69); Chợ Lớn, Saigon, South Vietnam
- Citizenship: Vietnam; Hong Kong
- Occupation: Actor
- Years active: 1977–present
- Notable work: The Bund (1980)
- Spouse(s): Kathy Chow (1988–1989); Cally Kwong (1996–1997); Yang Xiaojuan (2001–present)
- Children: Lui Sin-yeung (呂善揚)

Chinese name
- Traditional Chinese: 呂良偉
- Simplified Chinese: 吕良伟
Transcriptions
Standard Mandarin
- Hanyu Pinyin: Lǚ Liángwěi
Yue: Cantonese
- Jyutping: Leoi5 Loeng4-wai5

Vietnamese name
- Vietnamese: Lữ Lương Vỹ

Raymond Lui Leung-wai (Vietnamese: Lữ Lương Vỹ, born 22 December 1956) is a Vietnamese-Hong Kong actor. Born in Chợ Lớn, Saigon, South Vietnam, he traces his ancestry to Lianjiang, Guangdong. He is best known for his roles as "Ting Lik" in the TVB series The Bund (1980) and as "Ng Sik-ho" in the gangster biopic To Be Number One (1991).

== Early life and career ==
Lui was born in a Hoa family in Chợ Lớn, Saigon, South Vietnam, in 1956. His father, a businessman, moved from China to Vietnam in the 1940s. In 1967, during the Vietnam War, Lui moved to Hong Kong with his family and was encouraged by his father to join an actors' training class. He enrolled in TVB's Artists Training Class in the 1970s and began acting as extras or minor characters in various television series produced by the television network. In 1980, Lui rose to fame after playing "Ting Lik" in the period television series The Bund, co-starring with Chow Yun-fat and Angie Chiu. He continued to portray "Ting Lik" in the two sequels to The Bund (The Bund II and The Bund III). Since then, Lui has been playing the leading roles of various TVB-produced television series in the 1980s. Lui retired from TVB in 1989 and went to work on films and mainland Chinese television series. He returned to TVB in 2009, starring as "Marcus Cheuk" in the television drama Born Rich.

== Filmography ==
=== Film ===
Year	Title	Role
1980	The Informer 金手指	
1980	Dangerous Encounter – 1st Kind 第一類型危險	
1982	Funny Boys; Friend過打Band	Officer Chan
1983	Tsi Fa Tse Say 摯花者死	
1983	Health Warning 打擂台	Gei
1984	Dor Ching Chung 多情種	
1986	Lin Wan Pao 連環炮	
1987	Project A Part II; A計劃續集	Man Tin-ching
1987	Enchanting Night 良宵花弄月	Chun-wah
1987	Yeung Kwai Tsai 養鬼仔	
1988	Walk on Fire 獵鷹計劃	Lee Ho Lung
1989	Devil Hunters 獵魔群英	
1989	Four Flowers 四千金	Lo Bat
1989	Forever Young 返老還童	Yiu Tak-fai
1989	What A Small World 我愛唐人街	
1989	Yau Hei Kwai Tsak 遊戲規則	
1989	Mr Canton and Lady Rose 奇蹟	
1989	Mang Kwai San Fan 2 猛鬼山墳2	
1990	Fatal Termination 赤色大風暴	John
1991	Thunder Rain 破繭急先鋒	
1991	Tuk Ho 毒豪	
1991	The Good, the Bad and the Bandit 忠奸盜	
1991	God of Gamblers III: Back to Shanghai 賭俠2之上海灘賭聖	Ting Lik
1991	To Be Number One 跛豪	Ng Kwok-ho
1992	Legend of the Brothers 四大家族之龍虎兄弟	Ho
1992	Yat Doi Hiu Hung Chi Sam Chi Kei 一代梟雄之三支旗	
1993	Lord of East China Sea 歲月風雲之上海皇帝	Lu Yunsheng
1993	Lord of East China Sea II 上海皇帝之雄霸天下	Lu Yunsheng
1993	Hero of Hong Kong 1949 一九四九之劫後英雄傳	
1993	End of the Road 異域之末路英雄	
1993	The Incorruptible 李洛夫奇案	
1993	A Touch of Class 天台的月光	
1993	Zaishi Zhuihun 再世追魂	
1994	The Great Conqueror's Concubine 西楚霸王	Xiang Yu
1994	Gangster Lawyer 流氓律師	
1994	Hunting List 終極獵殺	
1994	Gun of Dragon 虎穴屠龍之轟天陷阱	
1995	The Robbers on Tran-Siberian Express 中國十大奇案之中俄列車大劫案	Xiang Chong
1998	The Suspect 極度重犯	
1999	Big Spender 轟天綁架大富豪	Di Fu-keung
1999	The Mistress 迷失森林	
2000	Undercover Blues 刑-殺之法	Chan Fai
2000	Bloody Secret 愛殺2000	
2000	2000 A.D. 公元2000	
2000	Home for a Villain 古惑夕陽紅	
2004	6AM 大無謂	
2007	Flash Point 導火線	Archer Sin
2007	The First of August 八月一日	
2008	The Pretty Women 女人我最大	Kelvin Qiao
2010	Macau 1949 澳門1949	
2010	Death and Glory in Changde 喋血孤城	Lieutenant General Yu Chengwan
2011	The Founding of a Party 建党伟业	Wu Peifu
2013	7 Assassins 光輝歲月	Prince
2013	Firestorm 風暴	Paco
2014	Siddhartha 釋迦牟尼佛傳	Gautama Buddha
2014	Transformers: Age of Extinction 變形金剛4	Motorcyclist
2014	Battle of Zhenhai	
2016	708090	Feng Huaping
2017	Tomorrow is Another Day	
2018	Air Strike	Air Force Colonel
2018	The Bravest Escort Group	
2019	Space Intellectual	
2019	Song of the Assassins	
2020	The Infernal Walker	Officer Lau
2021	Dynasty Warriors	Yuan Shao
2021	Raging Fire	Yiu Yeuk-sing
2022	Death Notice	Tang Wah
TBD	Raging Havoc	

=== Television ===
Year	Title	Role
1978	The Heaven Sword and Dragon Saber 倚天屠龍記	Extra
1979	The Good, The Bad and the Ugly 網中人	Ah-bill
1980	The Bund 上海灘	Ting Lik
1980	The Bund II 上海灘續集	Ting Lik
1980	The Bund III 上海灘龍虎鬥	Ting Lik
1981	In Love and War 烽火飛花	Wong Hon-shing
1981	Kung Fu Master of Fat San 佛山赞先生	Chan Wah-shun
1981	Chin Lo 前路	
1981	Good Old Times (a.k.a. Alligator Pool) 鱷魚潭	Siu Luk-cheng
1982	Nam Tsi Hon 男子漢	Mak Shau-cheng
1982	King To 荊途	
1982	Love and Passion 萬水千山總是情	Chong Tin-ngai
1983	The Old Miao Myth 老洞	Chin Bong
1983	Sam Seung Fung 三相逢	
1983	Yung Tse Fuk Sing 勇者福星	
1984	Gary 39's Angel 黃金約會	Wu Chun-hung
1984	Rainbow Round By Shoulder 畫出彩虹	Yeung Siu-man
1984	Ka Yau Kiu Tsai 家有嬌妻	Yam Man-lik
1985	Lu Siniang Legend of Ching Lady 呂四娘	Yongzheng Emperor
1985	To Each It Sown 錯體姻緣	Koo Wai-nam
1985	Ho Nui Tong Chai 好女當差	
1985	The Rough Ride 挑戰	Kong Tin-wai
1985	The Flying Fox of Snowy Mountain 雪山飛狐	Wu Fei / Wu Yat-do
1985	Happy Spirit 開心女鬼	Ha Ka-kwong
1986	Siu Do Fung Wan 小島風雲	Yee Lun
1986	Dat Mo 達摩	Bodhidharma
1987	Lip Sa Hang Tung 獵鯊行動	Yuen Fai
1987	Cheng Sing-Kung 鄭成功	Koxinga
1987	The SIB Files 大班密令	Man Seung-chit
1987	Hou Ching 豪情	Yung Yut-sang
1988	Tai To Wui 大都会	
1988	Kwong Lung 狂龍	Chongzhen Emperor
1988	And Yet We Live 當代男兒	Kan Siu-hong
1988	Twilight of a Nation 太平天國	Hung Sau-chuen
1995	New Justice Bao 新包青天	Chin Chiu
1996	Nau Yeuk Fung Bo 紐約風暴	Bin Ho-tung
1999	Master of Zen 達摩祖師	Bodhidharma
2001	Zaixiang Xiaoganluo 宰相小甘羅	Lü Buwei
2002	Book and Sword, Gratitude and Revenge 書劍恩仇錄	Wen Tailai
2002	Diao Chan 貂蝉	Lü Bu
2003	The Price of Glory 刺虎	Nian Gengyao
2005	Hu Xueyan the Top Merchant 紅頂商人胡雪巖	Wang Youling
2005	Legend of Prince Shuo Er Ye 褡褳王爺	Yong Shuo
2006	Seven Swordsmen 七劍下天山	Prince Dokado
2007	The Sword and the Chess of Death 魔劍生死棋	Guan Yutian
2009	Born Rich 富貴門	Marcus Cheuk
2009	The Legend and the Hero 2 封神榜之武王伐紂	King Zhou of Shang
2011	All Men Are Brothers 水滸傳	Chao Gai
2011	The Han Triumph 大風歌	Emperor Gaozu of Han
2012	Legend of Yuan Empire Founder 建元風雲	Tolui
