= Patrick Tse =

Hong Kong actor and filmmaker (1936–2026)

- 謝賢
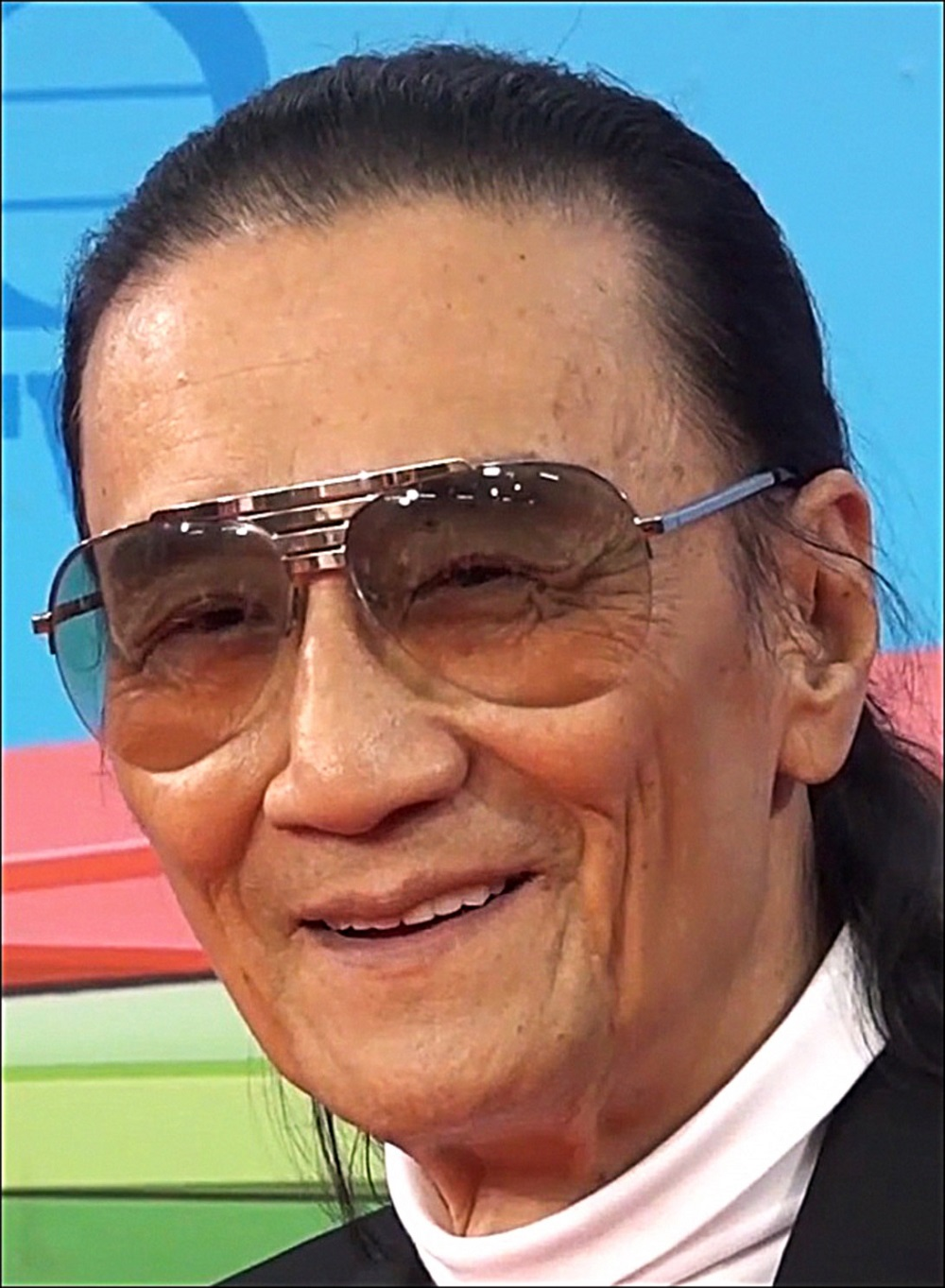
- Tse in 2018
- Born: Tse Ka-yuk (謝家鈺); 13 August 1936; Guangzhou, Guangdong, China
- Died: 16 July 2026 (aged 89); Hong Kong Sanatorium & Hospital, Happy Valley, Hong Kong
- Other names: Tse Yin; Fourth Brother
- Occupations: Actor; producer; director
- Years active: 1952–2026
- Spouses: Chen Chen (m. 1974; div. 1978); Deborah Lee (m. 1979; div. 1996)
- Partner: Coco Ma (2005–2017)
- Children: Nicholas Tse; Jennifer Tse

Tse Yin
- Traditional Chinese: 謝賢
- Simplified Chinese: 谢贤
Transcriptions
Standard Mandarin
- Hanyu Pinyin: Xiè Xián
Yue: Cantonese
- Jyutping: Ze6 Jin4

Tse Ka-yuk
- Traditional Chinese: 謝家鈺
- Simplified Chinese: 谢家钰
Transcriptions
Standard Mandarin
- Hanyu Pinyin: Xiè Jiā-yù
Yue: Cantonese
- Jyutping: Ze6 Gaa1-yuk6

Signature
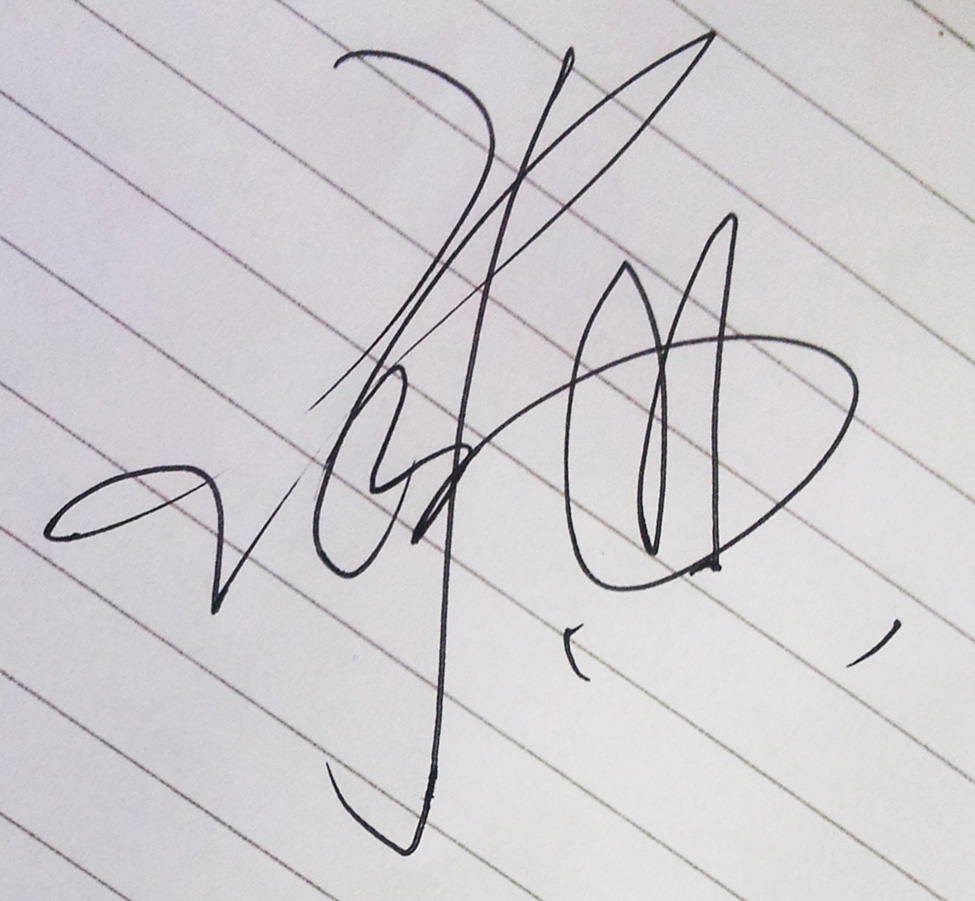

Patrick Tse Yin (born Tse Ka-yuk; 13 August 1936 – 16 July 2026) was a Hong Kong actor, producer, screenwriter and director in Hong Kong cinema.

== Career ==
Patrick Tse began his acting career in the 1950s and remained active for the next 40 years. He was a versatile and popular actor, usually playing the leading male roles.

Tse worked briefly as writer, director and producer in the 1970s:

- If Tomorrow Comes (1973) as producer/director
- Madness of Love (1972) as director
- One Year's Fantasy (1974) as writer/director
- Love in Cubicle (1974) as writer/director
- Farewell Dearest (1974) as director
- The Splendid Love in Winter (1974) as writer/director
- Love in Hawaii (1976) as producer/director
- Confused Love (1977) as director

He stopped acting in the 1990s after immigrating to Canada, but returned to acting in 1999.

In 2022, Tse won his first ever Best Actor award from the Hong Kong Film Critics Society for the movie Time.

== Personal life and death ==
In 1974, Tse married Chen Chen (Chinese: 甄珍), a Beijing-born Taiwanese actress, but they divorced in 1978.

Tse's second wife was Deborah Lee (Chinese: 狄波拉), a Hong Kong actress. They had two children, Hong Kong actor-singer Nicholas Tse and actress and model Jennifer Tse. Tse and his family lived in Vancouver after his retirement from acting, but they have since returned to Hong Kong. In 1996, Tse divorced Lee. In 2005, Tse began a relationship with Coco Ma, a Shanghai native who was 49 years his junior. Tse and Ma broke up in late 2017 and he had his son gave her HKD20 million as a settlement for the split, although both of them still remained as close friends.

Tse died from pneumonia at the Hong Kong Sanatorium & Hospital in Happy Valley on 16 July 2026, at the age of 89.

== Filmography ==
=== Film ===
This is a partial list of films.

Year	English Title	Role	Notes	Ref.
1952	The Stormy Night (aka The Roar of the Earth)		Film debut	
1957	She Married an Overseas Chinese (aka China Wife)	Tsang Tai-Sing		
1957	The Whispering Palm (aka Moon Over Malaya)	Ngor Ming		
1964	The Beau	Ka Bo		
1966	The Spy with My Face	Cheung Man Fu and #1		
1967	Diamond Robbery			
1967	Man from Interpol			
1967	The Professionals	Kam Chun-Yue		
1967	Revenger			
1967	The Story of a Discharged Prisoner (aka Upright Repenter)	Lee Cheuk-hung		
1967	To Rose with Love			
2001	Shaolin Soccer	Hung		
2018	A Beautiful Moment			
2019	Missbehavior			
2020	Forensic Heroes IV	Long Siu-tin	Cameo appearance	
2021	Time	Chau	Hong Kong Film Award for Best Actor; Hong Kong Film Critics Society Awards for Best Actor; Hong Kong Film Directors' Guild Award for Best Actor	

=== Television ===
Year	English Title	Role	Notes	Ref.
1979	Over the Rainbow	To Yat-tin		
1980	The Bund II	Tik Wan-chi		
1980	The Shell Game	Law Sei Hoi		
1981	The Shell Game II	Law Sei Hoi		
1982	Demi-Gods and Semi-Devils	Duen Ching-sun		
1983	The Legend of the Condor Heroes: The Iron-Blooded Loyalists	Yeung Tit-sum		
1983	The Legend of the Condor Heroes: Eastern Heretic and Western Venom	Yeung Tit-sum		
1983	The Legend of the Condor Heroes: The Duel on Mount Hua	Yeung Tit-sum		
1985	The Flying Fox of Snowy Mountain	Miu Yan-fung		
1986	Heir to the Throne Is...	Cheung Leung		
1986	The Legend of Wong Tai Sin	Prince Lung		
2005	Central Affairs			

== See also ==
- Patsy Kar
