= Susanna Au-yeung =

Hong Kong actress (1953–2017)

Susanna Au-yeung (Chinese: 歐陽佩珊; 6 December 1953 – 9 July 2017) was a Hong Kong actress.

Born Chan Kit Ying (陳潔英), Au-yeung began acting in the 1960s and retired in 1993, ostensibly because she was chosen as a backup for actresses who decided to leave their roles on multiple drama series especially at TVB in projects such as Don't Look Now (執到寶) and The Good, the Bad and the Ugly.

In 1993, Au-yeung trained and became an acupuncturist in Hong Kong.

Au-yeung was married to actor Kwok Fung from 1977 to her death at the age of 63 in 2017 of lung cancer. They had no children of their own but raised an adopted son.

== Partial filmography ==
- The Romantic Swordsman (television; 1978)
- Chor Lau-heung (television; 1979)
- The Good, the Bad and the Ugly (television; 1979)
- The Proud Twins (1979)
- The Bund (television; 1980)
- The Bund III (television; 1980)
- The Return of the Condor Heroes (television; 1983)
- The Yang's Saga (television; 1985)
- Heir to the Throne Is... (television; 1986)
- The Legend of Wong Tai Sin (television; 1986)
- The Rise and Fall of Qing Dynasty (television; 1992)
