= Frances Yip =

Hong Kong singer

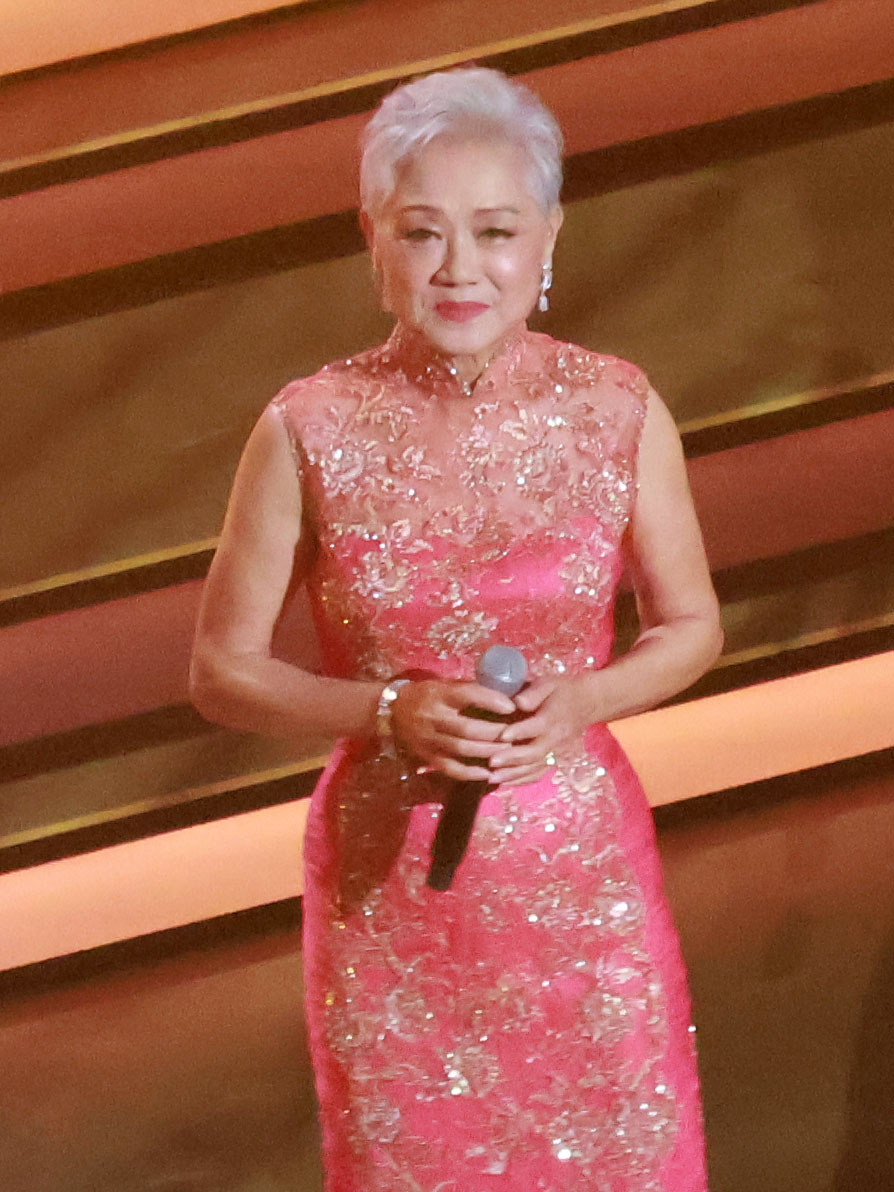
- Yip at the Hong Kong Coliseum in 2023
- Born: 22 October 1947 (age 78); British Hong Kong
- Occupation: Singer
- Years active: 1969–present
- Awards: MTV Asia Awards 2009

Chinese name
- Traditional Chinese: 葉麗儀
- Simplified Chinese: 叶丽仪
Transcriptions
Standard Mandarin
- Hanyu Pinyin: Yè Lìyí
Yue: Cantonese
- Jyutping: jip6 lai6 ji4
- Musical career
- Origin: Hong Kong
- Genres: Cantopop; Hong Kong English pop; easy listening; Traditional pop; country; folk
- Instrument: Singing
- Labels: EMI

Frances Yip Lai-yee (born 22 October 1947) is a Hong Kong singer. She is best known for performing many of the theme songs for television series produced by TVB in the 1980s and early 1990s.

== Biography ==
Born on 22 October 1947, Yip is of Hakka ancestry, and is the youngest of 5 siblings. She grew up in a rural area in Hong Kong, and studied in St. Clare's Girls' School, an English Catholic school.

Her first singing job was in 1969 when she won a talent contest called Sharp's Night Four Lights Competition (聲寶之夜) on Hong Kong television where she met the composer, Joseph Koo. Koo used Yip to sing commercial Jingles while she was working as a secretary in HSBC, one was the jingles was a song about savings account for HSBC. Her first record, Bu Liao Qing (Love Without End) was recorded in the same year. At that time she recorded predominantly English covers of Mandarin songs and Mandarin songs.

In 1972, Yip and Joseph Koo went to Japan's World Singing gathering in Nippon Budokan. In 1973, Yip was working for Cathay Pacific as an Ambassador of Hong Kong under Hong Kong Tourism Board for a year, and her album, Discovery, was based on her experiences traveling. Discovery was sung in nine different languages to represent the 9 major destinations for Cathay Pacific then, and the album inspired a London talent agent to find her. She signed onto EMI Records and lived in London for two years. It was a worldwide contract, meaning she can have one English album released in 6 different languages in different areas of the world. Since then, she had renewed her two-year contract until now.

Yip hit international fame with her signature tune, The Bund (Chinese: 上海灘) from the TVB drama of the same title. After she recorded The Bund, she returned to Hong Kong.

In her 45-year career, Yip has released more than 80 albums, mostly of songs in American English, Indonesian, Thai, Malay, Mexican Spanish, Japanese, Tagalog, Hong Kong Cantonese, and Taiwanese Mandarin. She has performed on television, and in films, concerts and cabarets in more than 30 countries on five continents. Her linguistic skills, with unique interpretations of lyrics in English, Cantonese and Mandarin, as well as several other Asian languages, have led to a fan base across a wide range of cultures and countries.

Yip has worked with the Hong Kong Philharmonic Orchestra, the Vancouver Symphony Orchestra, the Hong Kong Chinese Orchestra, the Macau Chinese Orchestra, the Singapore Chinese Orchestra, the Youth Orchestra from the Nanyang Academy of Fine Arts, Singapore Symphony Orchestra and Thammasat University Philharmonic Orchestra in Bangkok as well as large orchestras in Kuala Lumpur.

Yip achieved worldwide recognition when she was selected by the Hong Kong government to be a co-presenter at the British Farewell Ceremony to mark the transfer of sovereignty in Hong Kong, alongside British actor Brian Blessed. The event on 30 June 1997, was watched by a television audience estimated at 120 million, in more than 80 countries worldwide.

In 2012, Yip recorded her first Christian album, Grace and Glory Psalm 84.

Yip is fluent in Chinese (Hong Kong Cantonese and Taiwanese Mandarin) and English. She often spends time in Sydney where her son and grandchildren live.

She was diagnosed with breast cancer in 1996, but was considered free of cancer in 2002. To celebrate eight years of being cancer-free, in 2010, she held a charity concert in Kuala Lumpur to benefit cancer research and treatment.

Since 2013, she and her husband have lived in the rural suburbs of Sydney, Australia with their son and grandson. They have Australian citizenship, and also own rental properties in England. She occasionally returns to Hong Kong to perform and make TV appearances.
