= Carol Cheng =

Hong Kong actress and host

- 鄭裕玲
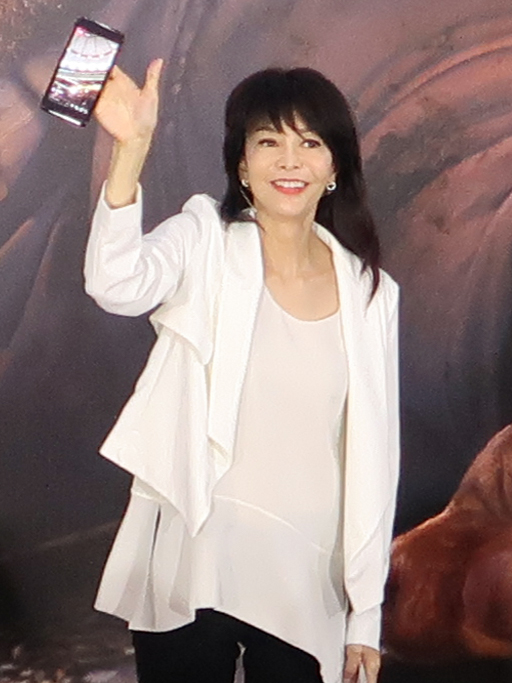
- Cheng in 2018
- Born: 9 September 1957 (age 69); British Hong Kong
- Other names: Do Do; Dodo Cheng; (嘟嘟/嘟姐/Do姐)
- Citizenship: British; Canadian; Chinese (Hong Kong)
- Occupations: Radio and television host; actress
- Years active: 1975–present
- Partner(s): Kam Kwok-Leung (1980–1990); Lui Fong (1992–2008)

Chinese name
- Traditional Chinese: 鄭裕玲
- Simplified Chinese: 郑裕玲
Transcriptions
Standard Mandarin
- Hanyu Pinyin: Zhèng Yùlíng
Yue: Cantonese
- Jyutping: Zeng6 Jyu6-ling4

YouTube information
- Channel: The Do Show
- Years active: 2023–present
- Subscribers: 498 thousand
- Views: 54.2 million
- Last updated: 10 September 2026

Carol Cheng Yu Ling (Chinese: 鄭裕玲; Jyutping: zeng6 jyu6 ling4), nicknamed Do Do, is a Hong Kong host and actress. Cheng made her break in TVB series The Good, the Bad and the Ugly (1979). She is the first to win both the Hong Kong Film Award for Best Actress and the TVB Anniversary Award for Best Actress, which are the highest honors for an actress in film and television in Hong Kong.

== Biography ==
Cheng was born in Hong Kong to Sichuanese parents. She received an English education in Hong Kong. After secondary school, she joined the actor training program at Commercial Television Limited in 1975 and debuted as a TV host the following year. After the collapse of the CTV in 1978, she moved to Television Broadcasts Limited, where she made her name as an actor and host. She is a frequent host of Miss Hong Kong Beauty Pageant, TVB Anniversary Awards, and other variety shows such as The Weakest Link. She's also known for her hosting collaboration with hip hop duo FAMA in TV shows.

In 1984, Cheng won the 3rd Hong Kong Film Awards Best New Performer. In 1988 and 1991, Cheng won the Hong Kong Film Awards for Best Actress. In 2000, Cheng won the TVB Anniversary Awards: My Favourite TV Role and Best Actress. Since the 2000s, Cheng retired from acting and focused on hosting.

In October 2022, Cheng left TVB after 44 years with the company. She started her YouTube talk show, the Do Show, in June 2023.

== Selected filmography ==
- Frugal Game (2002)
- War of the Genders [TVB series] (2000)
- My Rice Noodle Shop (1998)
- Her Fatal Ways 4 (1994)
- It's a Wonderful Life (1994)
- Holy Weapon (1993)
- Murder (1993)
- Her Fatal Ways 3 (1993)
- She Starts the Fire (1992)
- Heart Against Hearts (1992)
- Now You See Love... Now You Don't (1992)
- Neverending Summer (1992)
- Second to None (1992)
- Once a Black Sheep (1992)
- The Banquet (1991)
- Her Fatal Ways 2 (1991)
- Armour of God II: Operation Condor (1991)
- Her Fatal Ways (1991)
- Queen of Gamble (1991)
- Slickers vs. Killers (1991)
- The Top Bet (1991)
- To Catch a Thief (1991)
- BB 30 (1990)
- Tiger Cage 2 (1990)
- Promising Miss Bowie (1990)
- Brief Encounter in Shinjuku (1990)
- Heart into Hearts (1990)
- Burning Sensation (1989)
- Perfect Match (1989)
- The Yuppie Fantasia (1989)
- The Nobles (1989)
- Doubles Cause Troubles (1989)
- Tiger Cage (1988)
- The Eighth Happiness (1988)
- The Crazy Companies II (1988)
- Women Prison (1988)
- Sister Cupid (1987)
- The Return of the Condor Heroes (1976)

=== Music video appearances ===
- Denis Kwok - "越州公路 193" (2022)

=== Variety show ===
TVB

- Beautiful Cooking (2006)
- Do Do Goes Shopping (2015–2017)
- Do Did Eat (2016, 2018, 2019)
- Miss Hong Kong Pageant

HOY TV

- Where Do Do you go (2023)

== Awards and nominations ==
Cheng has been the recipient of several awards and nominations from the Hong Kong Film Awards:

Year	Award	Category	Film	Result
1984	3rd Hong Kong Film Awards	Best New Performer	The Last Affair	Won
1988	7th Hong Kong Film Awards	Best Actress	Wonder Women	Nominated
1988	25th Golden Horse Awards	Best Leading Actress	Moon, Star and Sun	Won
1989	8th Hong Kong Film Awards	Best Actress	Heart To Hearts	Nominated
1991	10th Hong Kong Film Awards	Best Supporting Actress	Queen's Bench II	Nominated
1991	10th Hong Kong Film Awards	Best Actress	Her Fatal Ways	Won
1992	11th Hong Kong Film Awards	Best Actress	Her Fatal Ways II	Nominated
2000	TVB Anniversary Awards	My Favourite Television Character	War of Genders	Won
2000	TVB Anniversary Awards	Best Actress	War of Genders	Won
2005	TVB Anniversary Awards	Best Show Host	Justice for All	Won
2012	TVB Anniversary Award	Outstanding Actress		Won
2016	The StarHub TVB Awards	My Favourite TVB Variety Show Host	Do Did Eat	Won
2016	TVB Anniversary Awards	Best Show Host	Do Did Eat	Won
