= Chow Yun-fat =

Hong Kong actor (born 1955)

Chow Yun-fat SBS
- 周潤發
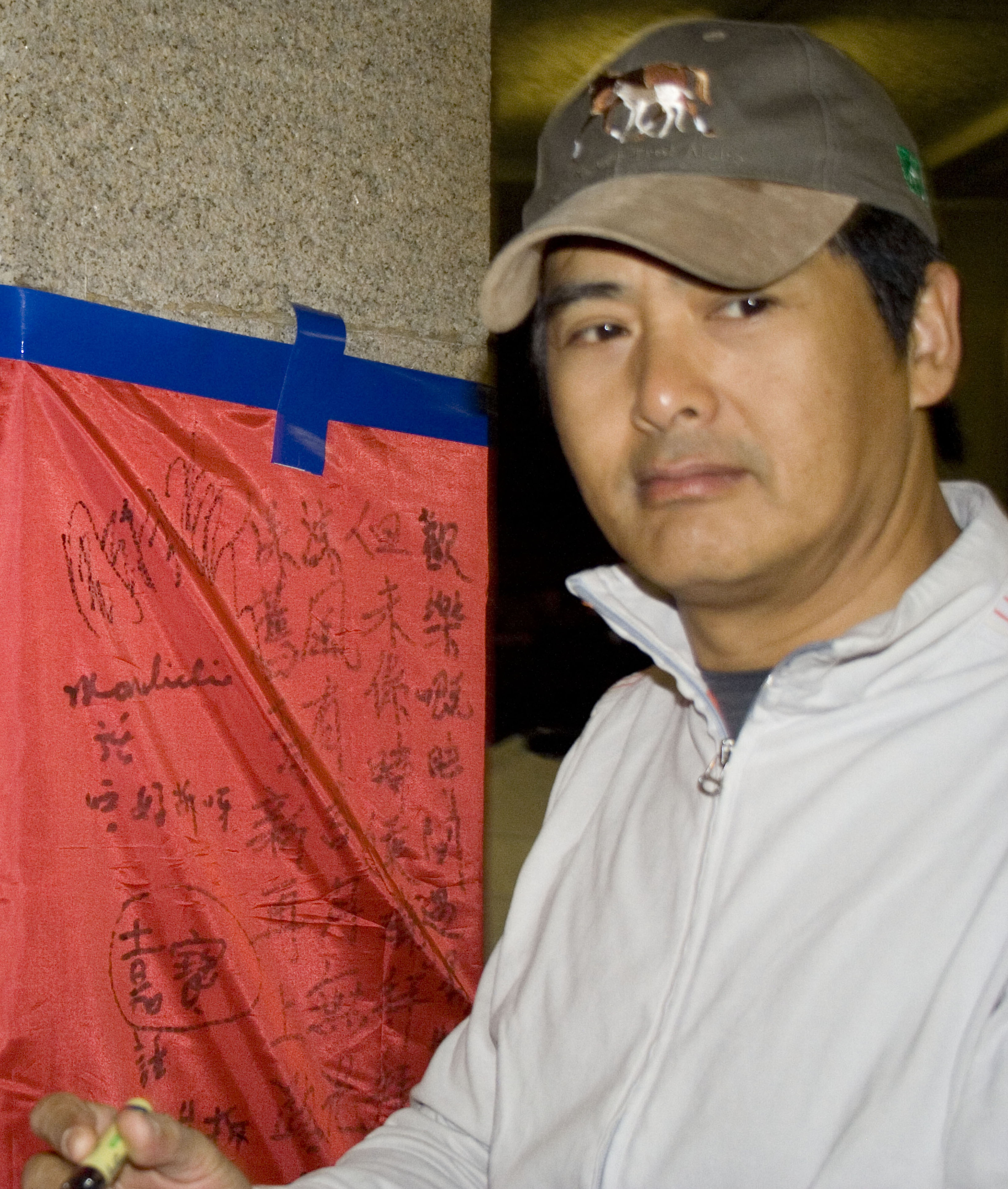
- Chow in 2007
- Born: 18 May 1955 (age 71); Lamma Island, British Hong Kong
- Other name: Donald Chow
- Occupations: Actor, singer
- Years active: 1973–present
- Spouses: Candice Yu (m. 1983; div. 1983) Jasmine Tan (m. 1986)
- Awards: Full list

Chinese name
- Traditional Chinese: 周潤發
- Simplified Chinese: 周润发
Transcriptions
Standard Mandarin
- Hanyu Pinyin: Zhōu Rùnfā
- Wade–Giles: Chou^{1} Jun^{4}-fa^{1}
- IPA: [ʈʂóʊ ɻwə̂nfá]
Yue: Cantonese
- Yale Romanization: Jāu Yeuhnfaat
- Jyutping: Zau1 Jeon6-faat3
- IPA: [tsɐw˥ jɵn˨fat̚˧]

Chow Yun-fat (born 18 May 1955), previously known as Donald Chow, is a Hong Kong actor and filmmaker. In a film career spanning more than forty-five years, Chow has appeared in over 100 television drama series and films. Known for his versatility, encompassing action and melodrama, comedy and historical drama, his accolades include three Hong Kong Film Awards for Best Actor and two Golden Horse Awards for Best Actor.

Chow was propelled to fame by TVB dramas such as The Good, The Bad And The Ugly (1979) and The Bund (1980). His first acclaimed film role came in the political drama The Story of Woo Viet (1981), in which he portrayed a Vietnamese refugee attempting to reach the United States. He is widely known for his collaborations with filmmaker John Woo in five Hong Kong action films: A Better Tomorrow (1986), which made Chow a box-office superstar in Asia, A Better Tomorrow II (1987), The Killer (1989), Once a Thief (1991), and Hard Boiled (1992), which introduced his iconic "Tequila" persona. He later reprised this character in the video game Stranglehold (2007), produced by Woo. Chow also made several popular action films with Hong Kong director Ringo Lam, including City on Fire (1987), Prison on Fire (1987), and Full Contact (1992). He is credited with helping bring Hong Kong gangster films to international prominence.

His other notable films in Asia include An Autumn's Tale (1987), The Eighth Happiness (1988), God of Gamblers (1989), All About Ah-Long (1989), Curse of the Golden Flower (2006), Let the Bullets Fly (2010), From Vegas to Macau (2014), and Project Gutenberg (2018). Chow made his Hollywood debut in The Replacement Killers (1998), for which critics lauded his understated performance. He is also known in the West for The Corruptor (1999), Anna and the King (1999), Crouching Tiger, Hidden Dragon (2000), for which he was nominated for Best Actor at the 2001 Hong Kong Film Awards and the 27th Saturn Awards, as well as for Bulletproof Monk (2003), and Pirates of the Caribbean: At World's End (2007).

== Early life and education ==
Chow was born in Lamma Island, Hong Kong, to Chow Yung-wan, who worked on a Shell Oil Company tanker, and Chan Lai-fong, who was a cleaning lady and vegetable farmer. Chow grew up in a farming community on Lamma Island, in a house with no electricity. He woke up at dawn each morning to help his mother sell herbal jelly and Hakka tea-pudding on the streets; in the afternoons, he went to work in the fields. His family moved to Kowloon when he was ten. At 17, Chow left school to help support the family by doing odd jobs including a bellboy, postman, camera salesman, and taxi driver.

== Career ==
In 1973, the 18-year-old Chow responded to a newspaper advertisement for TVB's actor training program (high school). After a one-year training, he signed a three-year contract with the TV station and made his acting debut in soap operas. He gained recognition in such dramas as The Killer (1976) and Hotel (1976). He had his breakout role in The Good, the Bad and the Ugly (1979), followed by The Bund, a series about the gangsters in 1930s Shanghai. The latter made Chow a star across Asia.

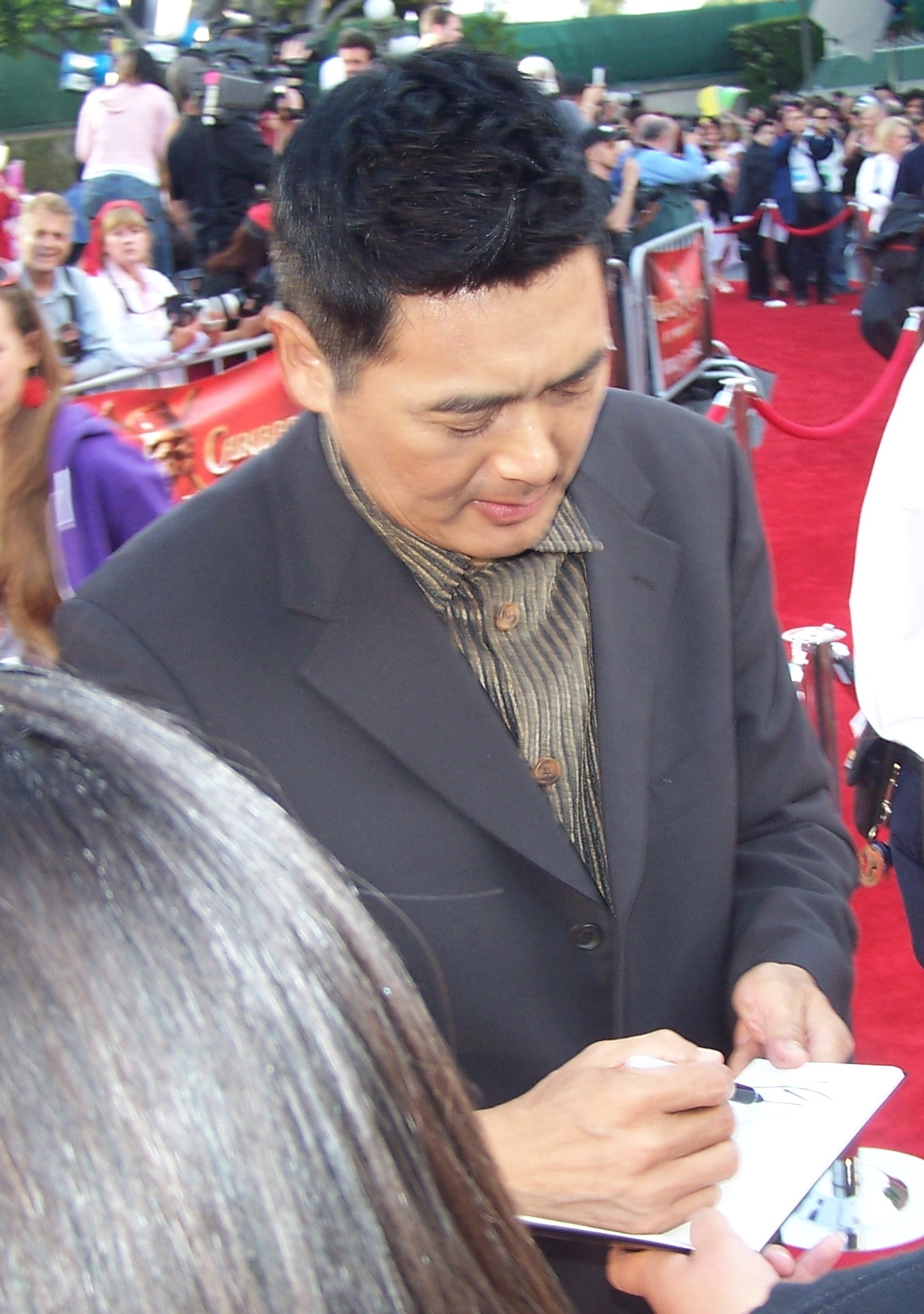
Chow at the premiere of Pirates of the Caribbean: At World's End in 2007

Although Chow continued his TV success, his goal was to become a film actor. He made his film debut in 1976 after signing an exclusive contract with Goldig Films, then the third largest film company in Hong Kong. Goldig Films, founded and solely-funded by Indonesian Chinese businessman Gouw Hiap Kian, later became a major property and investment enterprise. It produced and distributed over 150 movies from 1972 to 1982. Gouw was never a film director. Most of Chow's movies with Goldig Films in the 1970s achieved high gross revenues of over HK$1 million per movie, which is a better box office performance than his movies in early 1980s, such as Modern Heroes (江湖檔案), Soul Ash (灰靈), The Bund (上海灘), The Bund Part 2 (上海灘續集). Hot Blood (1977)'s gross box revenue was HK$ 1.62m which was ranked the fourth that year as the highest. However, Chow's occasional ventures into low-budget films in the 1980s after he left Goldig Films were disastrous and so he was then being referred to as Box Office Poison in the 1980s in the short transitional period.

Success came when he teamed up with film director John Woo in the 1986 gangster action-melodrama A Better Tomorrow, which swept the box offices in Asia and established Chow and Woo as megastars. A Better Tomorrow won him his first Best Actor award at the Hong Kong Film Awards. It was the highest-grossing film in Hong Kong history at the time, and set a new standard for Hong Kong gangster films. Taking the opportunity, Chow quit TV entirely. With his new image from A Better Tomorrow, he made many more 'gun fu' or 'heroic bloodshed' films, such as A Better Tomorrow II (1987), Prison on Fire (1987), Prison on Fire II (1991), The Killer (1989), A Better Tomorrow 3 (1990) and Hard Boiled (1992). He won his second Best Actor award for his role in the more realistic crime thriller City on Fire (1987), an inspiration for Quentin Tarantino's Reservoir Dogs.

Chow may be best known for playing honorable tough guys, whether cops or criminals, but he has also starred in comedies like Diary of a Big Man (1988) and Now You See Love, Now You Don't (1992) and romantic blockbusters such as Love in a Fallen City (1984) and An Autumn's Tale (1987), for which he was named Best Actor at the Golden Horse Awards. He brought together his disparate personae in the 1989 film God of Gamblers, directed by the prolific Wong Jing, in which he was by turns a suave charmer, a broad comedian, and an action hero. The film surprised many, became immensely popular, broke Hong Kong's all-time box office record, and spawned a series of gambling films as well as several comic sequels starring Andy Lau and Stephen Chow. The often tough demeanour and youthful appearance of Chow's characters has earned him the nickname "Babyface Killer."

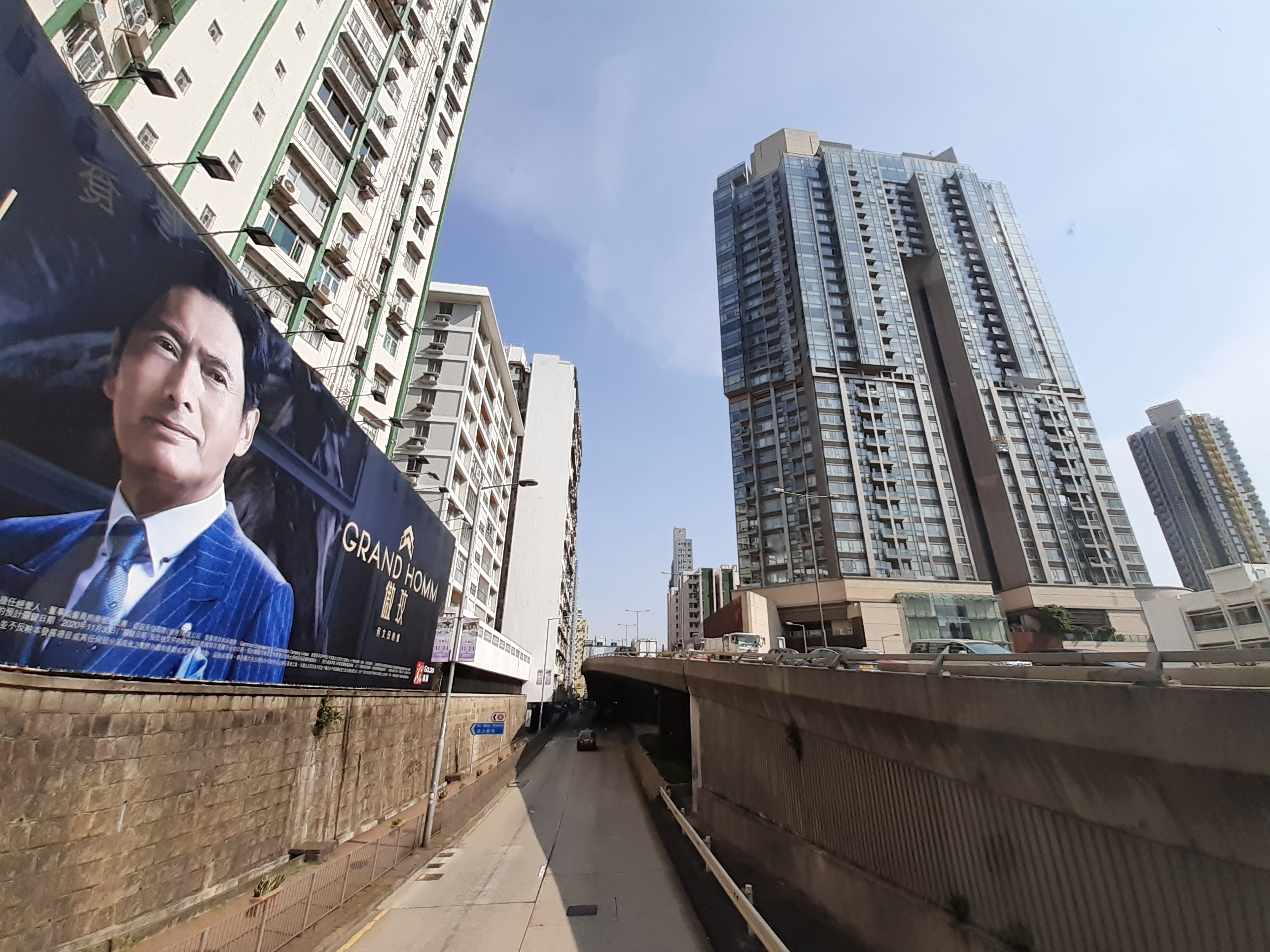
Advertisement featuring Chow in 2019

The Los Angeles Times proclaimed Chow Yun-Fat "the coolest actor in the world". In the mid '90s, Chow moved to Hollywood in an ultimately unsuccessful attempt to duplicate his success in Asia. His first two films, The Replacement Killers (1998) and The Corruptor (1999), were box office failures. In his next film Anna and the King (1999), Chow teamed up with Jodie Foster, but the film underperformed at the box office. Chow accepted the role of Li Mu-bai in the (2000) film Crouching Tiger, Hidden Dragon. It became a winner at both the international box office and the Oscars. In 2003, Chow came back to Hollywood and starred in Bulletproof Monk. In 2004, Chow made a surprise cameo in director Dayyan Eng's Chinese rom-com favourite Waiting Alone; it was the first time he was in a mainland Chinese film. In 2006, he teamed up with Gong Li and Jay Chou in the film Curse of the Golden Flower, directed by Zhang Yimou.

In 2007, Chow played the pirate captain Sao Feng in Pirates of the Caribbean: At World's End. However, his part was omitted when the movie was shown in mainland China, where, according to Chinese unofficial sources, government censors felt that Chow's character "vilified and humiliated" Chinese people.

From 2014 to 2016, Chow reunited with his God of Gamblers director Wong Jing to make the From Vegas to Macau franchise. For the part, he lost 13 kg within 10 months. In 2018, he co-starred with Aaron Kwok in Project Gutenberg, which earned him another Best Actor nomination at the 38th Hong Kong Film Awards.

In 2023, he became the second Hong Kong actor, after Tony Leung, to be named Asian Filmmaker of the Year at the 28th Busan International Film Awards.

== Personal life ==
Chow married twice. In 1983, he married Candice Yu, an actress with Asia Television; the marriage only lasted nine months. In 1986, Chow married Singaporean Jasmine Tan. After having a stillborn daughter in 1991, they decided not to have children.

Despite being famous for using martial arts moves on the screen, Chow, in a conversation with Metro, revealed that he relied heavily on stunt coordinators and was not all as 'athletic' as it seemed, mentioning, "I am not like Bruce Lee or Jackie Chan".

In 2018, Chow's wife Jasmine Tan disclosed that Chow’s net worth was HK$ 5.6b, which was not verified by any third party. Chow said he would donate 99% of his wealth to charity.

Chow maintains a modest public image by frequenting food stalls and public transportation in Hong Kong. Chow ran a half marathon in less than 2 hours 30 minutes in November 2023.

In October 2014, Chow voiced support for students in the Umbrella Movement, a civil rights movement for universal suffrage in Hong Kong.

Chow speaks fluent Cantonese and English, but speaks non-fluent Mandarin with heavy Cantonese accent. Despite having worked on Mandarin-speaking films especially in mainland China for years, his Mandarin-speaking remains poor even by native Mandarin-speakers' standards and very challenging to him.

== Filmography ==
Chow has appeared in over 95 films and over 25 television series.

== Bibliography ==
On 26 June 2008, Chow released his first photo collection, which includes pictures taken on the sets of his films. Proceeds from the book's sales were donated to Sichuan earthquake victims. It is published by Louis Vuitton.

== Awards and nominations ==
Hong Kong Film Awards

- Best Actor Nomination for Hong Kong 1941
- Best Actor Nomination for Women
- Best Supporting Actor Nomination for Love Unto Waste
- Best Actor for A Better Tomorrow
- Best Actor Nomination for Prison on Fire
- Best Actor Nomination for An Autumn's Tale
- Best Actor for City on Fire
- Best Original Film Song Nomination for The Diary of a Big Man
- Best Original Film Song Nomination for Triads: The Inside Story
- Best Actor Nomination for God of Gamblers
- Best Actor for All About Ah-Long
- Best Actor Nomination for Once a Thief
- Best Actor Nomination for Treasure Hunt
- Best Actor Nomination for Peace Hotel
- Best Actor Nomination for Crouching Tiger, Hidden Dragon
- Best Actor Nomination for Curse of the Golden Flower
- Best Supporting Actor Nomination for The Postmodern Life of My Aunt
- Best Actor Nomination for Project Gutenberg

(14 Best Actor nominations, two Best Supporting Actor nominations, two Best Original Film Song nominations)

Chinese American Film Festival

- Golden Angel for Best Actor in a Leading Role for Project Gutenberg (2019)
- 28th Busan International Film Festival
  - The Asian Filmmaker of the Year (2023)

== University honorary awards ==
- Hong Kong Academy for Performing Arts – Honorary Fellow (1999)
- City University of Hong Kong – Honorary Doctor of Letters (2001)
- Hong Kong Baptist University – Doctor of Humanities, honoris causa (2021)
