= Xuanren =

Xuanren may refer to:

- Xuanren Temple, a Taoist temple in Beijing, China
- Duan Yu (1083–1176), Dali monarch, posthumous name Emperor Xuanren
