= Xuanren Temple =

Taoist temple in Dongcheng, Beijing, China

Coordinates: 39.9225°N 116.4031°E

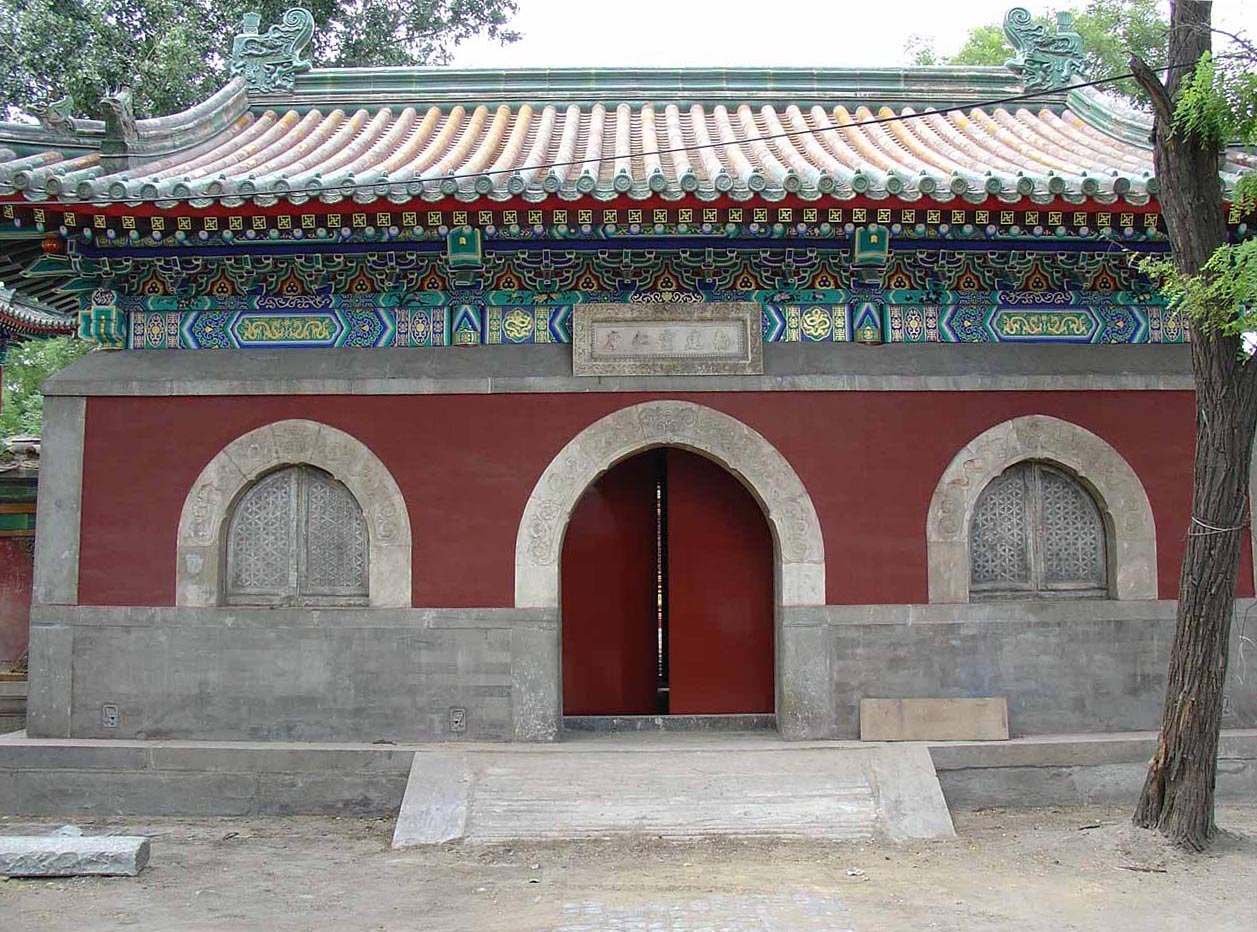
Entrance to the Xuanren Temple

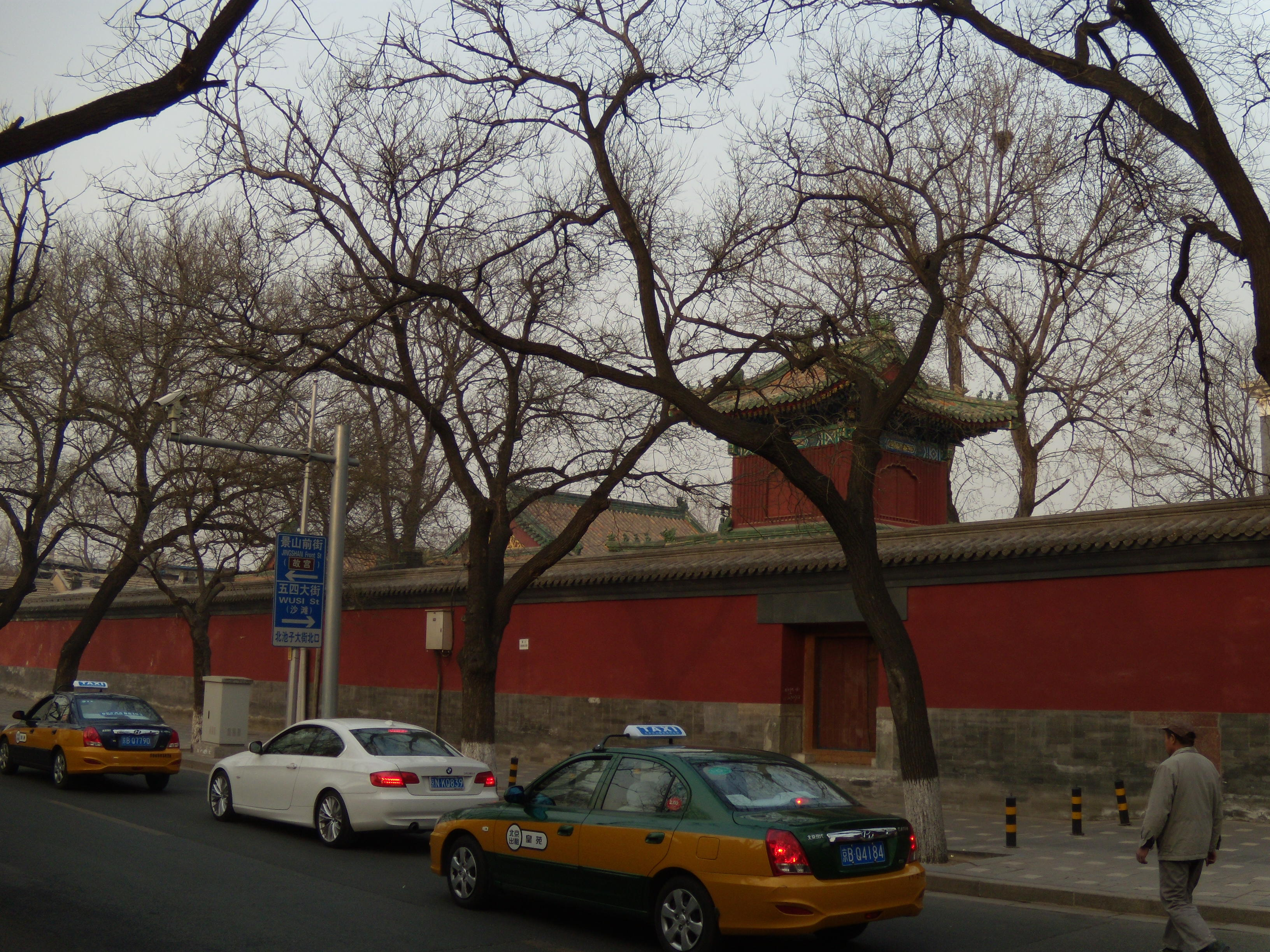
View of the temple from the street

The Xuanren Temple (宣仁庙/宣仁廟) is a Taoist temple in Beijing, China. Located in the Dongcheng District, it was built in 1728 during the Qing dynasty.
