= List of Hong Kong Category III films =

The symbol for a Category 3 film rating in Hong Kong.

The following is a non-exhaustive list of Category III films produced in Hong Kong. According to the Hong Kong motion picture rating system introduced in 1988, the restriction applicable to Category III films is thus defined: "No persons younger than 18 years of age are permitted to rent, purchase, or watch this film in the cinema." This applies to films produced in Hong Kong or elsewhere.

The Category III rating is applicable to films produced anywhere. The list below contains only Category III films produced in Hong Kong.

== Pre–1988 ==
Films released before 1988 were rated retroactively when the rating system was introduced.

- The Golden Lotus (1974)
- Love Swindlers (1976)
- Dangerous Encounters of the First Kind (1980)
- Devil Fetus (1983)
- Seeding of a Ghost (1983)
- Possessed (1983)
- Possessed II (1984)
- The Rape After (1984)
- Hong Kong Godfather (1985)
- The Seventh Curse (1986)

== 1988–1999 ==
This period is generally considered as the one when most Category III Hong Kong films were produced.

1988

- Men Behind the Sun (1988)
- Her Vengeance (1988)
- School on Fire (1988)
- Gunmen (1988)

1989

- Bloody Brotherhood (1989)
- Triads: The Inside Story (1989)
- Runaway Blues (1989)
- Sentenced to Hang (1989)

1990

- Bullet in the Head (1990)
- An Eye for an Eye (1990)
- Erotic Ghost Story (1990)
- Queen of Temple Street (1990)
- Triad Story (1990)

1991

- Oriental Harem (1991)
- Fist of Fury 1991 (1991)
- Sex and Zen (1991)
- The Holy Virgin Versus the Evil Dead (1991)
- Riki-Oh: The Story of Ricky (1991)
- Robotrix (1991)
- Lethal Panther (1991)

1992

- Dr. Lamb (1992)
- My Wife's Lover (1992)
- Naked Killer (1992)

1993

- Perfect Exchange (1993)
- My Better Half (1993)
- Love to Kill (1993)
- The Spirit of Love (1993)
- Crazy Love (1993) aka. The Fruit Is Ripe 1
- Crime Story (1993)
- Daughter of Darkness (1993)
- Run and Kill (1993)
- The Untold Story (1993)
- Retribution Sight Unseen (1993) aka. Three Days of a Blind Girl
- Raped by an Angel (1993) Note that Raped by an Angel 2 and 5 are rated as Category IIB.
- Women on the Run (1993)
- Remains of a Woman (1993)
- A Day Without Policemen (1993)

1994

- Girls Unbutton (1994)
- Beauty Evil Rose (1994) aka. The Beauty's Evil Roses
- Daughter of Darkness 2 (1994)
- Dream Lovers (1994)
- Brother of Darkness (1994)
- A Chinese Torture Chamber Story (1994)
- Fatal Encounter (1994)
- Red to Kill (1994)
- The Tragic Fantasy - Tiger of Wanchai (1994)
- Twenty Something (1994)
- The Underground Banker (1994)

1995

- Eternal Evil of Asia (1995)
- Trilogy of Lust (1995)

1996

- Horrible High Heels (1996)
- Sex and Zen II (1996)
- Naked Assassins (1996)
- Viva Erotica (1996)
- Ebola Syndrome (1996)

1997

- The Fruit Is Swelling (1997) aka. The Fruit Is Ripe 2
- Happy Together (1997)
- Intruder (1997)

1998

- Nude Fear (1998)
- Young and Dangerous: The Prequel (1998)
- Sex and Zen III (1998)
- The Untold Story 2 (1998)
- Raped by an Angel 3: Sexual Fantasy of the Chief Executive (1998)
- A Chinese Torture Chamber Story 2 (1998)

1999

- The Fruit Is Ripe 3 (1999)
- Erotic Nightmare (1999)
- Iron Sister (1999)
- A Lamb in Despair (1999)
- Raped by an Angel 4: The Raper's Union (1999)

== 2000–2015 ==
- Spacked Out (2000)
- There Is a Secret in My Soup (2001)
- Human Pork Chop (2001)
- 3 Extremes II (2002)
- Fu Bo (2003)
- Sexy Soccer (2003)
- Three... Extremes (2004)
- Ab-normal Beauty (2004)
- Dumplings (2004)
- Election (2005)
- SPL: Sha Po Lang (2005)
- Election 2 (2006)
- Dog Bite Dog (2006)
- Exiled (2006) (Note: One scene shows Simon Yam's character shaking hands with another gangster with their left hands turned around, making a triads agreement handshake. The scene is present on the Mega-Star uncut Limited Edition DVD. However, only the Category IIB cut version was released in Hong Kong theatrically.)
- The Heavenly Kings (2006; rated for explicit profanity)
- Whispers and Moans (2007), directed by Herman Yau
- Lust, Caution (2007)
- Mad Detective (2007)
- Gong Tau: An Oriental Black Magic (2007)
- Fatal Move (2008)
- Hong Kong Bronx (2008)
- Besieged City (2008)
- The Forbidden Legend Sex & Chopsticks (2008)
  - The Forbidden Legend Sex & Chopsticks 2 (2009)
- The Unbelievable (2009)
- A Very Short Life (2009)
- Shinjuku Incident (2009)
- Dream Home (2010)
- Revenge: A Love Story (2010)
- Love in a Puff (2010; rated for positive portrayal of smoking)
- 3D Sex and Zen: Extreme Ecstasy (2011)
- The 33D Invader (2011)
- Love Actually... Sucks! (2011)
- Vulgaria (2012)
- Due West: Our Sex Journey (2012)
  - Due West 2: Our Sex Vacation (2014)
- Tales from the Dark 1 (2013)
  - Tales from the Dark 2 (2013)
- 3D Naked Ambition (2014)
- The Gigolo (2015)
  - The Gigolo 2 (2015)
  - The Gigolo 3 (2015)

== 2016–2026 ==
- The Cases 2 (2016)
- The Gigalo 2 (2016)
- Nessun Dorma (2016)
- The Mobfathers (2016)
- Asura: The City of Madness (2016)
- Cyber War (2016)
- The Taste of Betel Nut (2017)
- The Sleep Curse (2017)
- Affection (2017)
- Dickman (2017)
- With Prisoners (2017)
- Thirty Years Adonis (2017)
- Members Only (2017)
- Operation Red Sea (2018)
- My World (2018)
- No Sleep Club (2018)
- High-Heeled Shoes (2018)
- Meili (2018)
- Three Husbands (2018)
- G Affairs (2018)
- Category III: The Untold Story of Hong Kong Exploitation Cinema (2018)
- The Fallen (2019)
- The Lady Improper (2019)
- Inside the Red Brick Wall (2020)
- River of Desire (2020)
- Night of Shemale: A Mad Man Trilogy 1/3 (2020)
- Drifting (2021)
- Coffin Homes (2021)
- Limbo (2021)
- Save Polyu (2021)
- Fire Room (2021)
- The Sparring Partner (2022)
- Lucky Cat (2022)
- The Sparring Partner (2022)
- Apostles (2022)
- Anatomy of Rats (2022)
- Time, Time and Again (2022)
- Onpaku (2022)
- Bodyshop (2022)
- Stonewalling (2022)
- White River (2023)
- My Pen Is Blue, (2023)
- The Reticent Wave (2023)
- Please Hold On (2023)
- Triad 2 (2023)
- Bursting Point (2023)
- Triad 3 (2024)
- Naked Nations - Tribe Hong Kong (2024)
- Bel Ami (2024)
- Queerpanorama (2025)
- Tournament 9 (2025)
- Sons of the Neon Night (2025)
- The Furious (2025)
- 731 (2025)
- Someone Like Me (2025)
- We're Nothing at All (2026)
- V (2026)

== See also ==
- Cinema of Hong Kong. See "Category III films" section.
- List of NC-17 rated films
- Video nasty
