= List of horror films of 1994 =

A list of horror films released in 1994.

Title	Director(s)	Cast	Country	Notes	Ref.
Amoklauf (translation: Rampage)	Uwe Boll	Michael Rasmussen, Birgit Stein, Christian Kahrmann	Germany		
Brainscan	John Flynn	Edward Furlong, Frank Langella, T. Ryder Smith	United Kingdom; United States		
Cemetery Man	Michele Soavi	Rupert Everett, François Hadji-Lazaro, Anna Falchi	Italy	Based on a Tiziano Sclavi novel called Dellamorte, Dellamore	
The Dark	Craig Pryce	Stephen McHattie, Brion James	Canada		
Dark Angel: The Ascent	Linda Hassani	Angela Featherstone, Daniel Markel	United States, Romania	Released direct to video by Full Moon Entertainment	
Dark Waters	Mariano Baino	Louise Salter, Venera Simmons	Russia; Italy; United Kingdom	Filmed in Ukraine	
Death Machine	Stephen Norrington	Brad Dourif, William Hootkins, Richard Brake, Ely Pouget	United States, Japan		
Funny Man	Toby Duckett, Simon Sprackling	Tim James, Christopher Lee, Benny Young	United Kingdom		
Ghoulies IV	Jim Wynorski	Peter Liapis, Barbara Alyn Woods, Stacie Randall	United States	Final film of Ghoulies film series	
Hellbound	Aaron Norris	Chuck Norris, Calvin Levels, Christopher Neame	United States	Filmed in Israel; Cannon Films' last movie	
In the Mouth of Madness	John Carpenter	Sam Neill, Julie Carmen, Jürgen Prochnow, Charlton Heston, John Glover, Bernie Casey, David Warner	United States	Pays tribute to the works of H.P. Lovecraft	
Interview with the Vampire	Neil Jordan	Tom Cruise, Brad Pitt, Antonio Banderas, Stephen Rea, Christian Slater, Kirsten Dunst	United States	Basd on the famous Anne Rice novel	
The Kingdom	Lars von Trier, Morten Arnfred	Ernst-Hugo Järegård, Kirsten Rolffes, Holger Juul Hansen	Denmark	Feature version edited from a Danish television series Story was later adapted into Stephen King's Kingdom Hospital (2004)	
Leprechaun 2	Rodman Flender	Warwick Davis, Charlie Heath, Shevonne Durkin	United States		
The Lurking Fear	C. Courtney Joyner	Vincent Schiavelli, Paul Mantee, Jeffrey Combs, Jon Finch, Ashley Lawrence	United States	Produced by Charles Band; Based on the H.P. Lovecraft story	
Mary Shelley's Frankenstein	Kenneth Branagh	Robert De Niro, Kenneth Br]]anagh, Tom Hulce, Helena Bonham Carter, John Cleese	United Kingdom; United States; Japan	Produced by Francis Ford Coppola	
Mirror, Mirror II: Raven Dance	Jimmy Lifton	Tracy Wells, Roddy McDowall, Sally Kellerman, Sarah Douglas, Veronica Cartwright, Lois Nettleton	United States	Sequel to Mirror, Mirror (1980)	
Multo in the City	Don Escudero	Manilyn Reynes, Zoren Legaspi, Herbert Bautista, Jaclyn Jose, Aiko Melendez	Philippines		
My Sweet Satan	Jim Van Bebber	Alydra Kelly, Nic Ratner, Push DeMankboy, Sherri Rickman	United Kingdom	Short 19-minute film	
Nadja	Michael Almereyda	Elina Löwensohn, Nic Ratner, Martin Donovan, Peter Fonda, Suzy Amis	United States	Filmed in black-and-white	
Night of the Demons 2	Brian Trenchard-Smith, Lynn D'Angona	Christi Harris, Bobby Jacoby, Merle Kennedy	United States	Sequel to Night of the Demons (1988)	
Nightwatch (Nattevagten)	Ole Bornedal	Nicolaj Coster-Waldau, Sofie Grabol, Kim Bodnia, Lotte Anderson	Denmark	Film was remade by the same director as Nightwatch in 1997	
Pedrito Masangkay: Walang Bakas na Iniwan	Francis Posadas	Ian Veneracion, Cristina Gonzales, Beth Tamayo, Andy Poe	Philippines		
Phantasm III: Lord of the Dead	Don Coscarelli	Reggie Bannister, A. Michael Baldwin, Angus Scrimm	United States	Produced and written by Don Coscarelli	
Pumpkinhead II: Blood Wings	Jeff Burr	Ami Dolenz, Andrew Robinson, Linnea Quigley, Soleil Moon Frye, Kane Hodder	United States	Sequel to Pumpkinhead (1988)	
Puppet Master 5: The Final Chapter	Jeff Burr	Gordon Currie, Chandra West, Teresa Hill, Guy Rolfe, Ian Ogilvy, Clu Gulager, Diane McBain	United States	Produced and written by Charles Band	
Red to Kill	Billy Tang	Bobby Yip, Money Lo, Lily Chung	Hong Kong		
Return of the Boogeyman (a.k.a. Boogeyman 3)	Ulli Lommel, Deland Nurse	Kelly Galindo, Omar Kaczmarczyk, Suzanna Love, Richard Quick	United States	Sequel to The Boogey Man (1980)	
Savage Harvest	Eric Stanze	Ramona Midgett, William Clifton, Lisa Morrison	United States	Filmed in Missouri, USA	
Shake, Rattle & Roll V	Don Escudero, Jose Javier Reyes, Manny Castañeda	Sheryl Cruz, Manilyn Reynes, Ruffa Gutierrez, Chuck Perez, Monsour Del Rosario, Jaclyn Jose	Philippines		
Shrunken Heads	Richard Elfman	Aeryk Egan, Rebecca Herbst, Bodhi Elfman, Julius Harris, Meg Foster	United States	Produced by Charles Band	
Skeeter	Clark Brandon	Charles Napier, Tracy Griffith, Michael J. Pollard	United States		
Sorceress	Jim Wynorski	Linda Blair, Edward Albert, Julie Strain	United States	Produced by Fred Olen Ray	
The Stand	Mick Garris	Gary Sinise, Miguel Ferrer, Jamey Sheridan, Molly Ringwald, Rob Lowe, Miguel Ferrer, Ruby Dee, Ossie Davis, Ray Walston	United States	Television Miniseries (366 minutes); Based on the Stephen King novel	
Subspecies 3: Bloodlust	Ted Nicolaou	Louise Salter, Venera Simmons ove, Kevin Spirtas	United States, Romania	Written by Charles Band	
The Unborn 2	Rick Jacobson	Michelle Greene, Robin Curtis, Scott Valentine, Darryl Henriques	United States	Produced by Roger Corman; Sequel to The Unborn (1991)	
Vampira	Joey Romero	Maricel Soriano, Christopher De Leon, Jayvee Gayoso, Nida Blanca	Philippines		
Vampires and Other Stereotypes (a.k.a. Hell's Belles)	Kevin Lindenmuth	Fia Perera, Sally Narkis, Monica Batavanis, Bill White, Ed Hubbard, Wendy Bednarz	United States	Filmed in New York City	
Watchers 3	Jeremy Stanford	Wings Hauser, Gregory Scott Cummins, Daryl Keith Roach	United States	Direct-to-Video; Produced by Roger Corman; Based on a novel by Dean Koontz; Filmed in Peru	
Wes Craven's New Nightmare	Wes Craven	Robert Englund, Heather Langenkamp, Miko Hughes, John Saxon,	United States	Standalone film of A Nightmare on Elm Street franchise	
Wicked Games	Tim Ritter	Patricia Paul, Lori Zippo, Joel D. Wynkoop	United States	An alternate cut of the film was made by German filmmaker Kruspe Doom	
Witchcraft VI: The Devil's Mistress (a.k.a. Witchcraft 666)	Julie Davis	Stephanie Swinney, Gale Van Cott, Jennifer Bransford	United States	Sixth film in the Witchcraft franchise	
Wolf	Mike Nichols	Jack Nicholson, Michelle Pfeiffer, James Spader, Kate Nelligan, Christopher Plummer, Eileen Atkins	United States	Music by Ennio Morricone	

== Sources ==
- Halle, Randall; McCarthy, Margaret (2003). Light Motives: German Popular Film in Perspective. Detroit, Michigan: Wayne State University Press. ISBN 978-0-814-33045-6.
- Muir, John Kenneth (2011). Horror Films of the 1990s. Jefferson, North Carolina: McFarland. ISBN 978-0-786-48480-5.
- Shary, Timothy (2009). Generation Multiplex: The Image of Youth in Contemporary American Cinema. Austin, Texas: University of Texas Press. ISBN 978-0-292-77490-2.
- Young, R. G. (2000). The Encyclopedia of Fantastic Film: Ali Baba to Zombies. Hal Leonard Corporation. ISBN 1-55783-269-2.
