= The Eternal Evil of Asia =

1995 Hong Kong film by Man Kei Chin

- 南洋十大邪術
- Directed by: Man Kei Chin
- Written by: Man Kei Chin
- Produced by: Yin-leung Ma
- Starring: Ellen Chan; Bobby Au-yeung; Lily Chung; Elvis Tsui; Power Chan
- Production company: Art Top Movie Productions Ltd.
- Distributed by: Upland Films Corporation Limited
- Release date: 14 September 1995
- Running time: 89 minutes
- Country: Hong Kong
- Language: Cantonese

The Eternal Evil of Asia (Chinese: 南洋十大邪術; pinyin: Nan yang shi da xie shu) is a 1995 Hong Kong comedy horror film directed by Man Kei Chin. Rated Category III in Hong Kong, the film is famous for a scene in which one of the character's heads transforms into a penis.

== Plot ==
The film follows a group of four friends, who on a hedonistic trip to Thailand, accidentally kill a sorcerer's sister, and upon arriving back home to Hong Kong, find themselves cursed.

== See also ==
- List of Hong Kong Category III films
