= All of a Sudden =

All of a Sudden may refer to:

- All of a Sudden (1996 film), a Hong Kong film
- All of a Sudden (2016 film), a German film
- All of a Sudden (2026 film), a drama film
- All of a Sudden (album), an album by John Hiatt
- "All of a Sudden", a song by Sweeney Todd from If Wishes Were Horses (album)
- "All of a Sudden", a song by Bette Midler from Some People's Lives
- "All of a Sudden", a song by Yes from Open Your Eyes (Yes album)
- "All of a Sudden", a song by Lil Baby, featuring Moneybagg Yo, from the album Too Hard
- "All of a Sudden", a song by XTC from their 1982 album English Settlement
