= Runaway Blues =

1989 Hong Kong film by David Lai

- Film poster
- Traditional Chinese: 飈城
- Simplified Chinese: 飙城
- Hanyu Pinyin: Biāo Chéng
- Jyutping: Biu1 Sing4
- Directed by: David Lai
- Screenplay by: Lai Kit
- Produced by: Wallace Cheung
- Starring: Andy Lau; Kelvin Wong
- Cinematography: Mark Lee Ping Bin
- Edited by: Marco Mak
- Music by: Law Wing-fai
- Production company: Movie Impact
- Distributed by: Tomson Films
- Release date: 3 March 1989
- Running time: 92 minutes
- Country: Hong Kong
- Languages: Cantonese; Mandarin; Japanese; English
- Box office: HK$5,661,927

Runaway Blues is a 1989 Hong Kong action film directed by David Lai and starring Andy Lau and Kelvin Wong. Due to its amount of violence, the film was rated Category III by the Hong Kong motion picture rating system.

== Plot ==
Southern Taiwanese triad member Lam Kong (Andy Lau) flees to Hong Kong after killing another triad leader (Blackie Ko) in a motorcycle race. He hides in the house of triad leader Nip Ching's (Chan King-cheung) mistress Sue (Shirley Lui), who is also the lover of Nip's underling Chiu Kwai (Sunny Fong). Nip thinks highly of Kong due to his hard work and living up his demand to assist Chui Kwai in trading.

Detective Ronny Cambridge (Robert Zajac) has been investigating Nip and Chiu's illegal activities and after his informant was recently killed, he blackmails Kong to be his new informant. Kong becomes pressured and Sue comforts him and gives him encouragements. As they spend time together, Kong and Sue gradually fall in love with each other.

During a deal of Rolex watches between Chiu and mainland Chinese triad Wah (Kelvin Wong), the goods suddenly disappear and Wah suspects Kong has stolen them. Being persecuted by Wah, Kong flees to Guangzhou, before finally heading to Macau and plans to bring Sue with him back to Taiwan.

== Cast ==
- Andy Lau as Lam Kong
- Shirley Lui as Sue Shek
- Ngok Ling as Kong's girlfriend from Taiwan
- Sunny Fong as Chiu Kwai
- Blackie Ko as Rival triad
- Kelvin Wong as Wah
- Tien Lie as Nip Ching's wife
- Chan King-cheung as Nip Ching
- Robert Zajac as Ronny Cambridge
- Cheung Sai
- Ng Ping-nam
- Chu Tai
- So Lai-chu
- Hon San

== Theme song ==
- "Do I Really Have Nothing Left" (是否我真的一無所有)
  - Composer: Chen Chih-yuan
  - Lyricist: Fred Chen
  - Singer: Dave Wong

== Box office ==
The film grossed HK$5,661,927 at the Hong Kong box office during its theatrical run from 3 to 15 March 1989 in Hong Kong.

== See also ==
- Andy Lau filmography
- List of Hong Kong Category III films
