= Dr. Lamb =

1992 Hong Kong film by Danny Lee

- DVD cover
- Traditional Chinese: 羔羊醫生
- Simplified Chinese: 羔羊医生
- Hanyu Pinyin: Gāo Yáng Yī Shēng
- Jyutping: Go1 Jeong4 Ji1 Sang1
- Directed by: Danny Lee; Billy Tang
- Screenplay by: Law Kam-fai
- Produced by: Danny Lee
- Starring: Danny Lee; Simon Yam; Kent Cheng
- Cinematography: Tony Miu; Kwan Chi-kan
- Edited by: Robert Choi
- Music by: Jonathon Wong
- Production company: Grand River Film
- Distributed by: Newport Entertainment; Golden Sun Film Company Limited
- Release date: 22 October 1992
- Running time: 89 minutes
- Country: Hong Kong
- Language: Cantonese
- Box office: HK$12,757,594

Dr. Lamb (羔羊醫生) is a 1992 Hong Kong crime film directed by Danny Lee and Billy Tang. The film stars Lee, Simon Yam and Kent Cheng. Dr Lamb was rated Category III by the Hong Kong motion picture rating system. The film is allegedly based on crimes actually committed in 1982 by Hong Kong serial killer Lam Kor-wan.

== Cast ==
- Danny Lee as Inspector Lee
- Simon Yam as Lam Gor-yue
- Kent Cheng as Fat Bing
- Lau Siu-ming as Lam Gor-yue's father
- Parkman Wong as Bully Hung
- Emily Kwan as Bo
- Perrie Lai as Lam's stepsister
- Chung Bik-wing as Leung Wing Yin
- Wong Wing-fong as Chau Sau-lan
- Julie Lee as Leung Man-lung
- Eric Kei as Eric
- King Kong Lam as KK
- Ma Lee
- Hui Sze-man as Lam's stepmother
- Amy Wong as Lam's ex-girlfriend
- Chan Yin-yung as Daughter of Lam's stepsister

== Release ==
=== Home media ===
Dr. Lamb was released on DVD by Ingram Entertainment on April 30, 2002 and was re-released on Blu-ray by Unearthed Films on August 9, 2022.

== Reception ==
HorrorNews.net gave the film a mixed review, writing, "Dr. Lamb skips back and forth between brutal violence that is seriously treated, and ridiculously over-the-top, even slapsticky sequences that seem out-of-place in what is meant to be a crime film based on a true story."

Joey O'Bryan of The Austin Chronicle awarded the film three out of five stars, stating, "A film that pushes the limits of bad taste in several key scenes, Dr. Lamb is a slick, and sick, exploitation item that both repels the viewer with its images of disturbing, misogynistic violence, in addition to tickling them with repulsive black humor à la early John Waters."
