= Danny Lee (actor) =

Hong Kong actor and film producer

- 李修賢
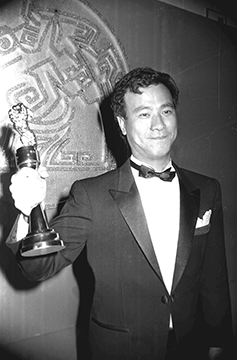
- Lee in 1984
- Born: 6 August 1952 (age 74); Shanghai, China
- Other name: Lee Sir
- Citizenship: Canadian; Chinese
- Occupations: Actor; film producer; film director; screenwriter; action director; martial artist; film presenter
- Years active: 1971–present

Chinese name
- Traditional Chinese: 李修賢
- Simplified Chinese: 李修贤
Transcriptions
Standard Mandarin
- Hanyu Pinyin: Lǐ Xiūxián

Danny Lee (Chinese: 李修賢; born 6 August 1952) is a Hong Kong actor, film producer, screenwriter, director, action director, martial artist and presenter. He is known for frequently portraying Hong Kong police officers in films such as Law with Two Phases, The Killer and The Untold Story, as well as being a Shaw Brothers alumnus, having starred in martial arts and action movies produced by that studio such as Infra-Man.

== Early years ==
Lee was born in Shanghai in 1952, with ancestral home in Shantou, Guangdong. In 1955, he moved to Hong Kong with his family. Lee did not do so well in school and sometimes skipped classes to help support his family by working. While growing up, he held policemen in high regard and so upon completing high school, he enrolled in the police academy but did not complete the training. He then decided to pursue a career in acting.

== Career ==
Lee entered the Shaw Brothers Studio-TVB Acting School in 1970. Since Lee was a black belt judoka and karateka, he was cast as Zhang Shun by director Chang Cheh in the 1972 film The Water Margin. The next year, Lee made his starring debut with River of Fury (江湖行). He then went on to star in Shaw Brothers' 1975 Hong Kong tokusatsu-style superhero movie and camp classic The Super Inframan playing the Chinese superhero himself. After Bruce Lee's death, Lee portrayed Bruce in Bruce Lee and I. During this time, Lee also acted in 1977's The Mighty Peking Man.

In 1979, he began working in the crime film genre, with The Brothers (1979), a remake of an earlier Bollywood film, Deewaar (1975), about two brothers on opposing sides of the law. In The Brothers, Lee played the role of a police officer, with a police persona he would carry over to his later films. The Brothers later inspired A Better Tomorrow (1986), which involves a similar plot about two brothers.

Still being offered roles in martial arts films, Lee decided in 1978 to form his own production company. One of the earliest products from his company, 1981's The Executor (執法者) (a.k.a. Heroic Cops) which was the first on-screen pairing with Lee and future co-star Chow Yun-fat.

In 1982, Lee directed his first films, One Way Only (單程路), and Funny Boys and then followed it up in 1984 with Law with Two Phases (a.k.a. Law with Two Faces) (公僕). The movie (for which Lee won both the Hong Kong Film Award for Best Actor and Taiwanese Golden Horse Award for Best Leading Actor for his acting) featured Lee as a hot-headed but just policeman. In later years, Lee has received numerous awards from police organisations for his dedication to showing realistic police procedures and donating money to the families of slain officers.

Law with Two Phases also inspired other directors. Some of the elements used in the shootouts were used by John Woo in his 1986 film A Better Tomorrow (英雄本色) and Law's documentary-like look inspired Kirk Wong to continue with a similar style. Both directors subsequently asked Lee to work with them. Lee then appeared with Chow Yun-Fat in Ringo Lam's 1987 gangster piece City on Fire (龍虎風雲) where he plays a criminal, and later appeared in John Woo's benefit project for Chang Cheh, Just Heroes (1987, which Lee also co-directed). Lee's next project with Woo was, 1989's The Killer. Lee worked with Kirk Wong again in 1994 with Organized Crime and Triad Bureau (a film Lee also produced), where once again, he plays a cop.

Besides cop versus criminal thrillers, Lee acted in comedies too, including Chase A Fortune and Big Score. He also directed two police comedies Cop Busters and Oh My Cops starring Kent Cheng and Wong Ching.

In 1987, Lee formed his second production company, Magnum Films, producing movies such as The Untold Story, Dr. Lamb, Water Tank Murder and Twist. In the late 1980s, Lee was also one of the producers to back Stephen Chow, who was at the time a small-time dramatic actor, but who would then go on to stardom after appearing in a series of "mo lei tau" (無厘頭) comedies. Lee also directed Chow in one of his first comedies, 1990's Legend of the Dragon (龍的傳人).

Lee returned to the big screen in the 2008 Hong Kong action film Fatal Move. He also made an appearance in Jingle Ma's action comedy Playboy Cops.

Though his on-screen output has slowed down in recent years, reduced to mostly cameo appearances in movies like Young and Dangerous 5 or low budget movies, Lee continues with his behind-the-scenes work.

== Selected filmography ==
- The Water Margin 水滸傳 (1972), actor
- All Men Are Brothers 蕩寇誌 (1975), actor
- Bruce Lee and I 李小龍與我(1975), actor
- The Super Inframan 中國超人 (1975), actor
- The Call Girls 應召名冊 (1977), actor
- The Battle Wizard 天龍八部 (1977), actor
- Goliathon 猩猩王 (1977), actor
- The Brave Archer 射鵰英雄傳 (1978), actor
- The Brave Archer 2 射鵰英雄傳續集 (1979), actor
- Life Gamble 生死鬥 (1979), actor
- The Brothers 差人、大佬、博命仔 (1979), actor
- The Heroes, also known as The Shaolin Heroes 少林英雄 (1980), actor
- The Informer 金手指 (1980), actor
- The Brave Archer and His Mate 神鵰俠侶 (1982), actor
- Law with Two Phases 公僕 (1984), actor
- Brotherhood 兄弟 (1986), actor
- City on Fire 龍虎風雲 (1987), actor
- Final Justice 霹靂先鋒 (1988), producer and actor
- No Compromise 赤膽情 (1988), actor
- Just Heroes 義膽群英 (1989), actor
- The Killer 喋血雙雄 (1989), actor
- Undeclared War 聖戰風雲 (1990), actor
- Red Shield 雷霆掃穴 (1991), producer and actor
- Rhythm of Destiny 伴我縱橫 (1992), producer and actor
- Dr. Lamb 羔羊醫生 (1992), director, producer and actor
- Run and Kill 機密檔案之烏鼠 (1993), actor
- The Sword Stained with Royal Blood 新碧血劍 (1993), actor
- The Untold Story 八仙飯店之人肉叉燒飽 (1993), producer and actor
- Organized Crime & Triad Bureau 重案實錄O記 (1994), producer and actor
- City Cop 公僕2 (1995), producer and actor
- Fatal Move 奪帥 (2008), actor
