= Fatal Vacation =

1990 Hong Kong film by Nam Yin

Fatal Vacation (An le zhan chang) (On lok jin cheung) (安樂戰場)
- Film Poster
- Directed by: Eric Tsang
- Written by: Nam Yin
- Produced by: Eric Tsang
- Starring: Eric Tsang; Irene Wan; Tang Pik-wan; Victor Wong; Paulo Tocha
- Cinematography: Jingle Ma
- Edited by: Chu Sun-kit; Kam Ma; Sek Chai
- Music by: Lam Manyee
- Production company: Friend Cheers Limited
- Distributed by: Golden Harvest Company
- Release date: 6 January 1990
- Running time: 92 minutes
- Country: Hong Kong
- Languages: Cantonese; Tagalog; English
- Box office: HK$6,737,912

Fatal Vacation (安樂戰場) is a 1990 Hong Kong action thriller film written by Nam Yin and directed by and starring Eric Tsang. The project was filmed on locations in the Philippines.

== Synopsis ==
On a visit to the Philippines, a group of unfortunate Hong Kong tourists find themselves abducted by the New People's Army (NPA) of the Communist Party of the Philippines, a rebel group. Its purpose is to exchange the Chinese men and women for their leader who has been taken in by the Government of the Philippines. The tourists come from a variety of backgrounds; there is Bob, the guide, his sidekick midget, Candy, a small boy with his grandparents, a trio of gangsters, a couple of police officers, a pair of twins, a womanizer and even prostitutes.

The tourists do not appear to get along well during the trip; however, some of them exhibit moral development as they realize that all of them need to stick together. Self-sacrifice is also displayed in certain situations when the NPA executes a number of them in order to coerce the Philippine government to hand over their big brother. Little do the antagonists realize that he has already been killed by the military and the holidaymakers witness more of their own mercilessly fall prey to the NPA's cruelty.

In the end, deciding that they must plan a course of action if they are to escape from the NPA, the remaining survivors shoot their way out of the zone they are held in and seek refuge in a cave. The small boy, apparently in search of his missing grandmother who was killed in action earlier while driving the tour bus, is separated from the group. A search party is organized in which the hiding spot of the tourists is almost given away by the innocent child. After helping the kid into the vehicle, Bob was killed when he was knocked off the bridge by a pursuing vehicle driven by NPA. In what appears to be a do-or-die situation, a chase scene ensues in which the NPA's second-in-command and his subordinates go after a van driven by the tourists. A triad member named Big Eyes sacrifices himself as he leaps into the vehicle of NPA's second in command's right hand man with a grenade in hand, taking them along with himself. The military's commander dispatches a large number of men in rescuing the hostages and the remaining NPA is confronted by a seemingly hopeless situation as the soldiers have their guns pointed at them.

Despite being heavily outnumbered and aware of the fact that there is no way out, the NPA's second-in-charge ties a bandanna around his forehead while reminding his remaining soldiers about their slogan; never giving up even in the toughest of situations.

In an effort to do whatever they can, he and his men passionately chant their motto while charging towards the military. After what seems like an endless hail of bullets fired by the soldiers, the NPA finally meets its fate. The movie ends as the tourists are helped out of the van, each's expressions denoting the trauma they have experienced and the memory of the loss of their loved ones.

== Partial cast ==
- Eric Tsang as Bob
- Irene Wan as Candy
- Tang Pik-wan as Grandma
- Victor Wong as Grandpa ("Egg Shen" from Big Trouble in Little China)
- Wong Kwong Leung as Big Eyes
- Joan Tong as Lam Sau Lai
- Cecilia Yu as Pat
- Yu Sin Man as Judy
- Nam Yin as Kwong
- Ben Lee as Wah
- Lee Kim Chung as Worm
- Emily Kwan as Television Crew Director
- Paulo Tocha as Sanchez
- Bernardo Bernardo as Aaron, Rebel Leader
- Spanky Manikan as Sam, Rebel Leader's brother
- Pen Medina as Leader of Military

== Reception ==
In August 2010, over 20 years since the film's original release, The Manila Bulletin noted that the film's plot was echoed by a recent event in the Philippines, where a discharged policeman took a tour bus and its occupants hostage, writing "it's quite uncanny how this movie shares 3 elements from what recently happened in the local news; the Philippines as the setting, Hong Kong tourists as characters, and a hostage crisis as plot. I know it shouldn’t be a subject for entertainment, but it really makes you think, is life imitating art?"

Robert Firsching of All Movie Guide was reminded of campy films such as Ernst R. von Theumer's Jungle Warriors by this film's "straight-faced melding of naive politics and ludicrously unconvincing gunplay." He writes, "To their credit, Tsang and Nam lay out a convincingly horrific series of dire consequences which could result from Hong Kong's impending reunification, but the political message is lost amidst all the gunfire, racist stereotypes, and Times Square grindhouse-level silliness."

Cinema Far East writes (Note: The original text in Cinema Far East, in German: Auf formaler Ebene gibt es dank der gelungenen und soliden Inszenierung von Eric Tsang, der auch in der Rolle des Reiseführers eine erstklassige Vorstellung abliefert, nichts auszusetzen. Leider wird aber auf Grund einiger aufgesetzt wirkender Brutalitäten und Vergewaltigungen diese Realitätsnähe nicht mit in die Story übernommen. Stattdessen wird viel zu viel Schwarzweißmalerei betrieben. Die Entführer z. B. erfüllen alle nur erdenklichen Klischees. Böses Grinsen, diabolisches Lachen und Manieren wie die ersten Menschen. Die Art wie die philippinischen Charaktere hier gezeichnet werden, muß man schon in höchstem Maße als rassistisch bezeichnen. Aber auch das Verhalten der unschuldigen Geiseln ist wenig glaubwürdig. Ihre Metamorphose von eingeschüchterten und völlig verängstigten Gefangenen zu gnadenlosen Kampfmaschinen ist der Geschichte nicht gerade zuträglich.)"On the formal level, there is nothing to criticize, thanks to the successful staging by Eric Tsang, who delivers himself well in the role of a tour guide. Unfortunately, however, this realism is not included in the storyline due to some of the seemingly staged brutalities and rapes incorporated into the film. Instead, there is too much of seeing things in black and white. The kidnappers, for example, meet every imaginable cliché: evil grins, diabolical laughter and caveman-like behavior. The way in which the Filipino characters are portrayed must be described as racist in the extreme. But the behavior of the innocent hostages is not very credible either. Their metamorphosis from completely intimidated and frightened prisoners to desperate battle machines is not exactly conducive to the story."

They offered that the film had redeeming qualities by writing: (Note: The original text in Cinema Far East, in German: "Trotzdem hat Fatal Vacation neben der erstklassigen Inszenierung auch seine guten Seiten. Ganz besonders die nicht gerade seltenen und ordentlich inszenierten Actionszenen dürften für einige Unterhaltung beim Zuschauer sorgen. Das besondere Highlight sind aber die Szenen im Gefangenenlager, die schon einige Elemente der Lagerszenen aus John Woo's Bullet In The Head vorwegnehmen und mit einigen äußerst intensiven Momenten aufwarten können.")"Nonetheless, Fatal Vacation's first-class staging also has its good points. Especially the rare and not very neatly staged action sequences should provide some entertainment for the audience. The special highlight, however, are the scenes in the prison camp, which already anticipate some of the elements of the camp scenes from John Woo's Bullet in the Head and can come up with some very intense moments."

Cinemania notes that the films of this period tend to borrow heavily from their Hollywood counterparts, and writes "...the plot is fairly light and can be easily followed enough even with out reading the subtitles or understanding what is being said on screen. This movie is a great example of the violent over the top camp produced during this time from HK without being too strange, silly or getting too involved with cultural themes/topics that will alienate Western audiences." They note that the film has both silliness and heavy-handedness without being too bogged-down by either, offering that the film maintains flow and balance.
