= Circus Kid =

1994 Hong Kong film by Wu Ma

- US film poster
- Traditional Chinese: 馬戲小子
- Simplified Chinese: 马戏小子
- Hanyu Pinyin: Mǎ Xì Xiǎo Zǐ
- Jyutping: Maa5 Hei3 Siu2 Zi2
- Directed by: Wu Ma
- Written by: Lee Man-choi
- Produced by: Lam Kong
- Starring: Donnie Yen; Yuen Biao; Irene Wan; Wu Ma
- Cinematography: Yeung Ho-cheong; Wong Sai-kit
- Edited by: Simon Fong
- Music by: Lowell Lo
- Production company: Tung Loong Overseas Group
- Distributed by: Modern Films and Entertainment Production
- Release date: 10 September 1994
- Running time: 109 minutes
- Country: Hong Kong
- Language: Cantonese
- Box office: HK$911,790

Circus Kid (also known as Circus Kids) is a 1994 Hong Kong martial arts action film directed by Wu Ma. This film stars Donnie Yen, Yuen Biao, Irene Wan and Wu himself.

== Plot ==
The circus group performs at the Shanfa Circus when a huge load of bombs crash on the stage and the performers try to find a home to live and get money for food.

== Cast ==
- Donnie Yen as Danton Lee
- Yuen Biao as Lo Yi-tung/Han
- Wu Ma as Master Shen Tinyi
- Irene Wan as Lan
- Lily Lee as May
- David Lam as Chiang Yitien
- Woo Ying-man
- Ken Lo as Lung
- Bey Logan as Melchior Owen
- Yuen Miu (cameo)
- Bei Lou-kam
- Kam Sap-yee
- Zheng Shuang

== See also ==
- Yuen Biao filmography
- Donnie Yen filmography
