= Vincent Wan (actor, born 1958) =

Hong Kong actor

- Born: 2 February 1958 (age 67); Portuguese Macau
- Education: Escola Dom João Paulino
- Occupation: Actor
- Years active: 1988–present

Chinese name
- Traditional Chinese: 尹揚明
- Simplified Chinese: 尹扬明
Transcriptions
Standard Mandarin
- Hanyu Pinyin: Yǐn Yángmíng
Yue: Cantonese
- Jyutping: Wan1 Jeong4 Ming4

Vincent Wan Yeung-ming (尹揚明, born 2 February 1958 in Macau) is a Hong Kong actor.

== Filmography ==
- Darkside of the Moon (2024)
- Find Your Voice (2017)
- Shock Wave (2017)
- Guia in Love (2015)
- Imprisoned: Survival Guide for Rich and Prodigal (2015)
- IPCC Files 2015 (2015) (TV series)
- Tales from the Dark 2 (2013)
- The Stool Pigeon (2010)
- Confession of Pain (2006) - Uncle Man
- Isabella (2006) - Bik-Yan's father
- Infernal Affairs III (2003) - Night club manager
- Payment in Blood (2001)
- Healing Hearts (2001) - Officer Chen
- The Young Ones (2001) - Officer Cheung
- Sex Medusa (2001)
- Those Were the Days... (2000) - Hon Ben
- Black Cat in Jail (2000)
- The Flying Fox of Snowy Mountain (1999) (TV series) - Miu Yan-fung
- Metade Fumaca (1999)
- The Storm Riders (1998) - Summit Yu
- Portland Street Blues (1998) - Ben Hon
- Young and Dangerous 5 (1998) - Ben Hon
- Chinese Midnight Express (1998) - Wan Chi-Hoe
- Walk In (1997) - Lo Bill
- Young and Dangerous 4 (1997) - Ben Hon
- Love Is Not a Game, But a Joke (1997)
- Ebola Syndrome (1996) - Yeung
- The Eighth (1996) - Ming
- Midnight Express in Orient (1996) - David Chiang
- To Be No. 1 (1996) - Seven
- Ghostly Bus (1995) - Bus Driver
- Legendary Couple (1995) - Lui Chan Sam
- S.D.U. - Mission in Mission (1994) - Chung-Bing
- The Other Side of the Sea (1994) - Sau's boyfriend
- How Deep Is Your Love (1994) - King of Curry
- Fatal Obsession (1994) - Frankie
- The Tragic Fantasy - Tiger of Wanchai (1994) - Hung
- Lover of the Swindler (1993) - Michael/Dr. Wong's partner
- Don't Stop My Crazy Love for You (1993) - Chiu
- Love Among the Triad (1993) - Tong Chun
- Shanghai Heroic Story (1992) - Lok Chi-Hing
- Call Girl '92 (1992) - Ah Man
- Vengeance (1992 TV series) - Fong Yau Wai
- Rich Man (1992) - Boss Ming
- Prison on Fire II (1991) - Fai Chi
- Fist of Fury 1991 (1991) - Cheng Wai
- Powerful Four (1991) - Sam
- Touch and Go (1991) - Pitt
- Rebel from China (1990) - Ming
- All for the Winner (1990) - Billy
- Wild Search (1989) - Cop
