= Death Trip (2015 film) =

2015 Chinese film by Billy Tang

- Film poster
- 夺命旅行
- Directed by: Billy Tang
- Written by: Chang You
- Produced by: Li Yunfei; Young Chien Lim
- Starring: Victor Wong; Zeng Yongti; Han Bo-reum; Chen Feng; Law Kar-ying
- Cinematography: Li Xiaofei; Choon Lin Yong
- Production companies: Asia Tropical Films; Fiction 9
- Distributed by: Sunwah Media
- Release date: 15 May 2015
- Running time: 87 minutes
- Country: China
- Language: Mandarin
- Box office: CN¥0.81 million (China)

Death Trip (Chinese: 夺命旅行) is a 2015 Chinese thriller film directed by Billy Tang. It was released on 15 May 2015, in China.

== Cast ==
- Victor Wong
- Zeng Yongti
- Han Bo-reum
- Chen Feng
- Law Kar-ying

== Production ==
Filming took place in Malaysia. Scenes include the Petronas Towers, Batu Caves, and beaches. Filming took place outdoors, which Sina Corporation noted is different from most thrillers which are shot in dark, cramped indoor areas.

== Reception ==
By May 15, the film had grossed CN¥0.81 million at the Chinese box office.
