= The Untold Story =

1993 Hong Kong film by Herman Yau

- Film poster

Chinese name
- Traditional Chinese: 八仙飯店之人肉叉燒包
- Simplified Chinese: 八仙饭店之人肉叉烧包
Transcriptions
Standard Mandarin
- Hanyu Pinyin: Bā Xiān Fàn Diàn Zhī Rén Ròu Chā Shāo Bāo
Yue: Cantonese
- Jyutping: Baat3 Sin1 Faan6 Dim3 Zi1 Jan4 Jeok4 Caa1 Siu1 Baau1
- Directed by: Herman Yau
- Written by: Law Kam-fai; Sammy Lau
- Produced by: Danny Lee
- Starring: Danny Lee; Anthony Wong
- Cinematography: Cho Wai-kee
- Edited by: Choi Hung
- Music by: Jonathan Wong
- Production companies: Uniden Investments; Kwan Hung Films
- Distributed by: Newport Entertainment; Golden Sun Films
- Release date: 13 May 1993
- Running time: 95 minutes
- Country: British Hong Kong
- Language: Cantonese
- Box office: HK$15,763,018

The Untold Story is a 1993 Hong Kong crime-horror film directed by Herman Yau and starring Danny Lee and Anthony Wong, with the former also serving as the film's producer.

The film is based on the "Eight Immortals Restaurant murders" that took place on 4 August 1985 in the Hei Sha Wan section of Areia Preta, Nossa Senhora de Fátima, Portuguese Macau. While the massacre of a family of 10 did occur at the restaurant, the alleged cannibalism is sensationalism inferred from the incomplete discovery of the victims' corpses, only finding limbs, and the lack of a smell of decomposition despite the tropical summer heat.

The film was followed up by two unrelated sequels: The Untold Story 2, with Wong returning in a supporting role, and The Untold Story 3 with Lee returning in another role.

== Plot ==
The story opens in 1978 with an argument in a small Hong Kong apartment. Chan Chi-Leung brutally beats a gambler named Keung nearly to death for refusing to lend him money before burning him alive. He flees the Hong Kong police, burning his identification documents and changing his name to Wong Chi Hang.

Eight years later, a Macau family discovers a bag of rotting arms and legs washed up on the beach. Police officers Bull, Robert, King Kong, and Bo arrive on the scene before being joined by their supervisor Inspector Lee. The cops take in the limbs for examination. The atmosphere in the police station is lax, with Lee regularly bringing in prostitute "dates," Bo openly pining for Lee, and her male colleagues cracking sexist jokes.

Wong Chi Hang, now operating the Eight Immortals Restaurant, receives and tears up a letter meant for Cheng Lam, the former owner of the restaurant. He tries to obtain legal ownership of the restaurant, but an attorney tells him it is impossible without the signature of Cheng Lam. Later, a waiter catches Wong cheating at Mahjong. After closing, he stabs the waiter in the eye with a spindle and beats him to death with a ladle, then makes buns with his flesh.

A forensics analyst identifies one of the severed arms as that of Chan Lai Chun, Cheng Lam's mother in law. The police also receive a letter from Cheng Lam's older brother, asking them to look into Cheng Lam's disappearance. Inspector Lee finds the coincidence suspicious and orders his subordinates to investigate the restaurant. Wong tells Bull and Robert that Cheng Lam has gone away and sold the shop to him, while Pearl, the hostess, tells Bo about the letters from the mainland the restaurant has received. Wong gives the police free buns and convinces them to leave. That night, Wong accuses Pearl of giving information to the police. He brutally beats her, rapes her, and stabs her vagina with chopsticks, killing her. He then dismembers her corpse as well.

Inspector Lee and his team visit the restaurant again the next day, and Wong continues to act suspiciously. The team shadows Wong that night, and he is arrested after trying to dispose of Cheng Lam's family's identification documents and flee to China. Lee correctly deduces that Wong cheated Cheng Lam at gambling, then murdered him and his family before stealing the restaurant, but Wong refuses to confess. When the police try to beat a confession out of him, Wong manages to alert the press, and Lee's team is reprimanded for police brutality.

To keep their own hands clean, the police have Wong put in a cell block with Cheng Poon, Cheng Lam's younger brother. They are approached by a pair of Hong Kong police detectives, who reveal Wong's real name and origin as a Hong Kong gambler named Chan Chi Leung and explain that they can charge him for the murder of Keung if Lee cannot find enough evidence to convict him of the Cheng Lam murders. Lee insists he can get the evidence.

Meanwhile, Cheng Poon and other prisoners beat Wong, who attempts suicide by slashing and biting his wrist and is rushed to the hospital. He briefly escapes by taking a nurse hostage and overpowering King Kong, but he is recaptured and beaten up once again. Lee then organizes endless torture for Wong until he confesses, injecting him with drugs, inducing insomnia, causing blisters on his skin and beating him frequently. After days of torture, Wong finally confesses.

Back when Wong was a cook in Cheng Lam's restaurant, he cheated at Mahjong to win HK$183,300, which Cheng refused to pay. Wong then took Cheng's wife and five children hostage. He first cut the throat of Cheng's son before stabbing the wife and Cheng himself, then butchered the four daughters. Later, he lured Cheng's mother-in-law into the restaurant, where he killed her as well. After the murders, Wong disposed of the bodies by dismembering them, dumping the arms and legs in the ocean, putting the flesh into "pork" buns, and throwing the bones in the trash.

After confessing, Wong is sent back to prison, where after one final confrontation with Lee and Bull, he commits suicide by slashing his wrists. The narration notes that while there was indeed enough evidence to charge Wong for the murders, it never happened due to his death.

== Cast and roles ==
- Anthony Wong as Wong Chi-hang/Chan Chi Leung
- Danny Lee as Officer Lee
- Emily Kwan as Bo
- Lau Siu-ming as Cheng Lam
- Shing Fui-On as Cheng Poon
- Eric Kei as Robert
- King Kong Lam as King Kong
- Parkman Wong as Bull
- James Ha as Wong's mahjong playmate
- Julie Lee as Pearl
- Ben Wong Tin-dok as Hairdresser
- Kowng Cho-fai as Macau policeman
- Tony Leung Hung-wah as Doctor
- Hui Sze-man as Cheng Lam's wife
- So Wai-nam as Policeman
- Dave Lam as Policeman at hospital
- Ng Kwok-kin as Policeman
- Fei Pak as Customs Officer Chan
- Jacky Cheung Chun-hung as Inmate

== Reception ==
=== Category III rating ===
In Hong Kong, due to its explicit and disturbing depictions of sex, violence and gore, The Untold Story was awarded a Category III rating (Persons Aged 18 and Above Only), the equivalent of the United States' NC-17 or X-ratings.

=== Box office ===
Despite its restrictive Category III rating, the film managed to gross an exceptional HK$15,763,018 at the Hong Kong box office during its theatrical run from 13 May to 2 June 1993.

=== Awards ===
The Untold Story received one nomination at the 13th Hong Kong Film Awards, which Anthony Wong won for Best Actor.

== See also ==
- Cannibalism in popular culture
- Eight Immortals Restaurant murders
