= The Legendary 'Tai Fei' =

1999 Hong Kong film by Kant Leung

- Film poster
- Directed by: Kant Leung
- Written by: Lee Siu-Kei
- Produced by: Lee Siu-Kei
- Starring: Anthony Wong
- Cinematography: Kwong Ting Wo
- Edited by: Angie Lam
- Distributed by: Wong Jing's Workshop Ltd. (Hong Kong)
- Release date: 10 December 1999
- Running time: 82 minutes
- Country: Hong Kong
- Language: Cantonese

The Legendary 'Tai Fei' (古惑仔激情篇之洪興大飛哥) is a 1999 Hong Kong film directed by Kant Leung and starring Anthony Wong. It is a spin-off to the Young and Dangerous film series.

== Synopsis ==
The film centralizes on the storyline after Tai Fei (Anthony Wong) obtains branch leader status after Young and Dangerous 4. Tai Fei discovers he has a son, and soon realizes that he is a triad member involved in the Tung Hing gang which deals in narcotics.
