= Rock N'Roll Cop =

1994 Hong Kong film by Kirk Wong

- DVD cover
- Traditional Chinese: 省港一號通緝犯
- Jyutping: Saang2 Gong2 Jat1 Hou6 Tung1 Cap1 Faan6
- Directed by: Kirk Wong
- Screenplay by: Lo Bing
- Produced by: Kirk Wong
- Starring: Anthony Wong Chau Sang, Wu Hsing-kuo, Yu Rongguang, Carrie Ng, Chen Ming chen
- Cinematography: Ko Chiu Lam (H.K.S.C)
- Edited by: Kam Ma
- Music by: Danny Chung
- Production company: Sky Point Film Investment Ltd.
- Release date: 29 June 1994
- Running time: 92 minutes
- Country: Hong Kong
- Language: Cantonese
- Box office: HK$5,184,309

Rock N'Roll Cop is a 1994 Hong Kong action crime drama film produced and directed by Kirk Wong, starring Anthony Wong Chau Sang, Wu Hsing-kuo, Yu Rongguang, Carrie Ng and Chen Ming Chen.

== Plot ==
In a rainy night, Captain Wong Kun and his colleagues were celebrating as Captain Wong' gained the opportunity to receive training in Beijing. After dinner, when Captain Wong's mentor is walking back home, Shum Chi-Hung and his fellows, known as the 'Chun-Lei Red Scarf', seek revenge and killed him.

The 'Chun-Lei Red Scarf' is known for being one of the most wanted criminals in both Shenzhen and Hong Kong. One day, they went to Mongkok and robbed a Mahjong school. Inspector Hung, selling gramophone records nearby, was involved in the gunfight. Later, as the Hong Kong Police received information from the Information Bureau, Hung was sent back to Shenzhen to collaborate with the Chinese authority in arresting the 'Chun-Lei Red Scarf'.

Hung then met Captain Wong. Together they start to seek for the 'Chun-Lei Red Scarf'. Th two parties met in a nightclub. After a gunfight, the 'Red Scarf' members fled away and hid themselves in Shenzhen.

Due to differences between their style, Hung and Captain Wong have some unhappy experience while helping each other at work. Hung asked to leave Shenzhen, but he also helped Wong to break the codes related to the 'Chun-Lei Red Scarf' before he left. Soon, Chi-Hung's girlfriend Hou-Yee went to Shenzhen to give Chi-Hung the money and fake passports he requested. Both Hong Kong and Chinese authority sent police to follow Hou-Yee at the same time. In order to control the situation, Captain Wong's team deliberately separated the Hong Kong police officials and destroy their plan. Desperate to solve the case, Inspector Hung decided to stay and help Captain Wong.

Hou-Yee was actually Captain Wong's former girlfriend. Wong wants Hou-Yee to stay away from danger as she helps Chi-Hung. When Hou-Yee met Chi-Hung, Chi-Hung killed Hou-Yee as she said she still 'remember' Captain Wong after all.

The Chinese Police arrested Chi-Hung at the same time. Inspector Hung's boss is angry of how Inspector Hung helped the Chinese authority. Through exerting diplomatic pressure, the Hong Kong Police forced the authority to send Chi-Hung back to Hong Kong. When Captain Wong and Hung are escorting Chi-Hung back to Hong Kong, Chi-Hung's gang suddenly appears to kidnap Hung and save their boss. Bearing the risk of being illegal immigrants as they cross the border, Captain Wong climbed over the border and have a gunfight with the criminals. Finally, Wong saved Hung from danger and killed Chi-Hung in a rural village in Hong Kong.

== Cast ==
- Anthony Wong Chau Sang as Inspector Hung
- Wu Hsing-kuo as Captain Wong Kun
- Yu Rongguang as Shum Chi-Hung
- Carrie Ng as Hou-Yee
- Chen Ming Chen as Singer

== Box office ==
The film grossed HK$5,184,309 at the Hong Kong box office during its theatrical run from 29 June to 13 July 1994 in Hong Kong.

== See also ==
List of Hong Kong films
