= Young and Dangerous 5 =

1998 Hong Kong film by Andrew Lau

- Film poster

Chinese name
- Traditional Chinese: 98古惑仔之龍爭虎鬥
- Simplified Chinese: 98古惑仔之龙争虎斗
Transcriptions
- Directed by: Andrew Lau
- Written by: Manfred Wong
- Produced by: Manfred Wong
- Starring: Ekin Cheng; Jason Chu; Jerry Lamb; Chin Kar-lok; Shu Qi; Alex Man; Sandra Ng; Vincent Wan; Paul Chun; Anthony Wong
- Cinematography: Andrew Lau
- Edited by: Marco Mak
- Music by: Chan Kwong-Wing
- Production company: Bob and Partners
- Distributed by: Golden Harvest Pictures; Warner Bros. Pictures
- Release date: 8 January 1998 (Hong Kong)
- Running time: 114 minutes
- Country: Hong Kong
- Language: Cantonese

Young and Dangerous 5 (simplified Chinese: 98古惑仔之龙争虎斗; traditional Chinese: 98古惑仔之龍爭虎鬥) is a 1998 Hong Kong triad film. It is the fourth sequel in the Young and Dangerous film series.

== Plot ==
Szeto Ho Nam from the Tung Sing Society attempts to take control of Causeway Bay by causing trouble at Chan Ho Nam's bars in Causeway Bay. Meanwhile, Big Head, a friend of Chan Ho Nam during their Hung Hing gangster heyday has been released from jail, having served 8 years, and works on the street as a newspaper vendor, attempting to have a peaceful life after being released without getting involved in gangster affairs. The Tung Sing members kept ruining Big Head's peaceful life by forcing him to give them money for protection racket.

Chian Tin Yeung, Sister 13, Chan Ho Nam, and many other branch leaders are invited to Malaysia by Chinese-Malaysian businessman, Datuk Chan Ka Nam. Chan Ka Nam fakes a business alliance with Chan Ho Nam, secretly helping Szeto Ho Nam to eliminate Chan Ho Nam. In Malaysia, Chan Ho Nam gets into a romantic relationship with Mei Ling, who's been forced to work for Chan Ka Nam. After she knows that she's been tricked, she decides to assist Chan Ho Nam in his plans to expose Chan Ka Nam.

After a confrontation with Tung Sing members, Banana Peel gets arrested and taken to the police station. There, he gets shot to death by a Tung Sing member whose brother was killed by Banana Peel during the confrontation.

Big Head decides to help Chan Ho Nam to fight a boxing match with the Tung Sing Society, whoever loses will need to disappear out of Causeway Bay. Big Head wins the match.

Meanwhile, Chan Ho Nam decides to challenge Szeto Ho Nam privately and Chan Ho Nam wins the fight as well.

At the end of the film, Datuk Chan Ka Nam gets beaten up by Pou Pan before getting arrested by Malaysian police, he was exposed with the help of Mei Ling and Tai Fei, who now runs a publishing office. Mei Ling and Chan Ho Nam officially begin their dating.

== Cast and roles ==
- Ekin Cheng - Chan Ho Nam
- Jason Chu - Banana Skin
- Jerry Lamb - Pou-pan
- Chin Kar-lok - Big Head
- Shu Qi - Mei Ling
- Mark Cheng - Szeto Ho Nam
- Paul Chun - Datuk Chan Ka Nam
- Alex Man - Chiang Tin Yeung
- Sandra Ng - Sister 13
- Vincent Wan - Ben Hon
- Anthony Wong Chau-sang - Tai Fei
- Danny Lee - Inspector Lee
- Chan Chi Fai - Gambler on Ship
- Cheung Man
- Billy Chow
- Kwan Hoi-Shan - Datuk's Friend
- Law Lan - Granny Chan
- Lee Siu-Kei - Kei
- Simon Lui
- Wang Tian-lin - Uncle Seventh
- Wong Chi Yeung
- Wong Man-Wai - Datuk's Accuser

== See also ==
- Young and Dangerous (series)
