= Organized Crime & Triad Bureau (film) =

1994 Hong Kong film by Kirk Wong

- Film poster
- Traditional Chinese: 重案實錄O記
- Jyutping: Cung2 Ngon3 Sat6 Luk6 I Gei3
- Directed by: Kirk Wong
- Screenplay by: Lo Bing
- Produced by: Danny Lee
- Starring: Danny Lee; Cecilia Yip; Anthony Wong; Fan Siu-wong; Roy Cheung; Louis Koo
- Cinematography: Chan Kwong Hung; Wong Wing-Hang
- Edited by: Hung Chow
- Music by: Danny Chung
- Production companies: Uniden Investments; Magnum Films
- Release dates: December 31, 1993 (VHS); January 7, 1994 (Hong Kong)
- Running time: 87 minutes
- Country: Hong Kong
- Language: Cantonese
- Box office: HK$8,081,301

Organized Crime & Triad Bureau is a 1994 Hong Kong action crime thriller film produced and directed by Kirk Wong, starring Danny Lee, Cecilia Yip, Anthony Wong, Fan Siu-wong, Roy Cheung and Louis Koo in his debut film role. In 1996, Tai Seng Video Marketing made a concerted effort to introduce the film to American audiences, and it has developed a following among fans of action film. The film was selected to be shown in Anthology Film Archives in 2018.

== Plot ==
Inspector Lee of the Organized Crime & Triad Bureau goes beyond the laws of Hong Kong in the hunt for a notorious robbery ring, led by Ho Kin-tung and Cindy.

== Cast ==
- Danny Lee as Inspector Rambo Lee Chun-san (李鎮山)
- Anthony Wong as Ho Kin-tung (何建東)
- Cecilia Yip as Cindy (阿詩)
- Fan Siu-wong as Tak (阿德)
- Roy Cheung as Inspector Lau Siu-chau (劉少秋)
- Louis Koo as Tung's underling

== See also ==
- List of Hong Kong films
