= Bloody Brotherhood =

1989 Hong Kong film by Wang Lung-wei

- Film poster
- Traditional Chinese: 同根生
- Simplified Chinese: 同根生
- Hanyu Pinyin: Tóng Gēn Shēng
- Jyutping: Tung4 Gan1 Sang1
- Directed by: Wang Lung-wei
- Screenplay by: Charles Tang
- Produced by: Wong Siu-ming; Yuen Kam-lun
- Starring: Andy Lau; Irene Wan; David Lam; Michael Chan; Shum Wai
- Cinematography: Yu Chik-lim
- Edited by: Fong Po-wah
- Music by: Richard Lo; Teddy Robin
- Production company: Chun Sing Films
- Distributed by: Chun Sing Films
- Release date: 7 January 1989
- Running time: 95 minutes
- Country: Hong Kong
- Language: Cantonese
- Box office: HK$5,940,788

Bloody Brotherhood is a 1989 Hong Kong action film directed by Wang Lung-wei and starring Andy Lau and Irene Wan.

== Plot ==
Cheung Ka-wah (Andy Lau) and his older brother, Ka-wai (David Lam) are attempting to enter Hong Kong illegally with their parents on a refugee ship. During the way, their sickly mother dies due to a lack of oxygen on the deck before the Chinese coast guards approach the ship, leading to a firefight between the guards and the refugees on board, and their father was killed in the gunfire. Ka-wah picks up a pistol and fires at the guards being getting shot and jumps into the sea, successfully sneaking into Hong Kong and was rescued by a boat girl, Kiu (Irene Wan), and her grandfather who nurse him back to health. On the other hand, Ka-wai was captured and deported back to mainland China and forced to work as a labour in a mine quarry.

After arriving in for Hong Kong, Ka-wai is unable to sustain a long term job due to getting into fights with other workers who bully him for being from China, so he decides to set up a stall selling Red bean ice in Sai Wan, but triad thugs arrive to extort protection fee from him and he beats them up and his stall was destroyed during the process. Angered, Ka-wah confronts their boss, Tong Fai (Michael Chan) in Wan Lai Tea Room, where Fai was gambling against his rival in the same triad, Fat Hoi (Shum Wai), in a bird fight. Ka-wah storms in the tea room and destroys Fai's bird cage and beats up several of his henchmen before being outnumbered, but Fai recognizes Ka-wah's courage and fighting skills and takes him as his underling and treats him like a son.

Meanwhile, Fat Hoi convinces his boss (Ku Feng) to traffick cocaine but Fai opposes it, which their boss agrees, so Fat Hoi retaliates by hiring outside thugs from a triad in Sheung Wan to start on fight in Ka-wah and Kiu's wedding. Their boss finds out about this and punishes Fat Hoi, who bites back by framing Fai for cocaine possession, which causes the latter to be sentenced to prison for seven years. Fai persuades Ka-wah to leave as far away as possible can to avoid any danger, so he moves to Keelung, Taiwan with Kiu and, changing his name to Cheung Tin-chau, and works in a shipping company owned by the latter's uncle. With Fai in prison, Fat Hoi was able to manipulate his boss into dealing with Thai drug lords and do big business.

Seven years later, Ka-wah, who has a daughter, San-san, with Kiu, who is also pregnant with their second child, takes over the shipping company from Kiu's uncle due to the latter's ailing health. On the other hand, Fat Hoi has earned a fortune from drug trafficking becomes the main leader of Chung Sing Tong Gang and also owns a transportation company to traffick cocaine. However, Fat Hoi's advisor, So advises him to invest in some legitimate business since the British government is working on building an anti-corruption agency in Hong Kong and suggests him to hire mainland Chinese criminals to rob an armoured car to obtain funds, so Fat Hoi hires three thugs for the job, which one of them is Ka-wai.

Afterward, Fat Hoi's Thai business partner offers to smuggle HK$10 million worth of cocaine to Taiwan with him and wants to collaborate with Ka-wah's company, but Ka-wah refuses, so Fat Hoi goes to Keelung to negotiate with Ka-wah, who beats up his henchmen after they start a fight in his company and warns Fat Hoi to leave Taiwan within 24 hours. Fat Hoi then sends Ka-wai to Keelung and kidnap San-san, but he accidentally suffocates her to death while evading the police, leaving him in shock and feels very remorseful. Ka-wah then returns to Hong Kong to seek revenge on Fat Hoi while Kiu is in the hospital, soon to be ready to deliver their second child.

Back in Hong Kong, Ka-wah notices Fai working as a window washer for Fat Hoi and become addicted to cocaine because the latter's henchmen in prison forced him to take the drug, and Ka-wah is determined to help him kick his addiction. However, Fat Hoi sends Ka-wai and a Vietnamese henchman (Dick Wei) to kill Ka-wah at Fai's hideout, where Fai is killed by the Vietnamese henchman, and Ka-wai eventually notices Ka-wah during the scuffle and kills the Vietnamese henchman instead. Ka-wah brings his brother back to his hotel room and sees Kiu, who witnessed and remembers Ka-wai as her daughter's kidnapper and killer, leaving Ka-wai feeling extreme guilt knowing he killed his own niece. When Ka-wai goes out to shop, Kiu attempts to stab Ka-wai, who stops her before leaving to seek revenge on Fat Hoi at a banquet celebration, but Fat Hoi stabs him and holds him hostage. Ka-wah returns shortly and after Kiu tells him about their daughter's murder, he notices an announcement of Fat Hoi's banquet on the newspaper and goes there armed with a hand saw and slaughters most of Fat Hoi's henchmen before Ka-wai frees and unties himself and Kiu (who arrived before her husband), and joins his brother in killing the rest of the henchmen. When the police arrive, Ka-wai pushes his brother away and stabs Fat Hoi to death, resulting in him being gunned down by the police.

== Cast ==
- Andy Lau as Cheung Ka-wah (張家華), a tough, daring, but impulsive young man who illegally enters Hong Kong and becomes a triad member under Tong Fai. After Fai was framed and imprisoned, he moves to Keelung, Taiwan with his wife and changes his name to Cheung Tin-chau (張天就) working in a shipping company before returning to Hong Kong to avenge the deaths of his daughter and former boss.
- Irene Wan as Ho Kiu (何嬌), a young boat girl in Hong Kong who rescues Ka-wah when he fled from Chinese coast guards and becomes his wife, but she often worries her husband working for the triads.
- David Lam as Cheung Ka-wai (張家華), Ka-wah's older brother who was caught by Chinese authorities while illegally entering Hong Kong with his brother and was forced to work as a labourer. When he enters Hong Kong a second time, he ends up working for Fat Hou and unknowingly kills his own niece during the process.
- Michael Chan as Tong Fai (唐輝), nicknamed Leng Fai (靚輝), one of the leaders of the Chung Sing Tong (忠勝堂) triad who takes Ka-wai as his underling as acts as a fatherly figure towards him, even paying for his wedding. He is benevolent and honorable, refusing to partake in drug trafficking due to the harms it can cause to people.
- Shum Wai as Ma Kwai-hoi (馬貴海), nicknamed Fat Hoi (肥海), Fai's rival and a leader of the Chung Sing Tong triad who frames Fai to be imprisoned for getting into the way of his cocaine trafficking business schemes.
- Ku Feng as the highest-ranking elder of the Chung Sing Tong triad who is rather incompetent and is manipulated by Fat Hoi after Fai was imprisoned.
- Lung Ming-yan as Lung (爛命龍), a triad leader from the Netherlands and an ally of Fei.
- Ken Lo as Ko (姑爺高), a triad leader from the Netherlands and an ally of Fei.
- Hung San-nam as Siu Sang-nam (蕭生南), a triad leader from the Netherlands and an ally of Fei.
- Wang Hsieh as Kiu's uncle and chairman of Chun Sing Shipping Co. Ltd. (駿升船務有限公司) in Keelung. He passes his business to Ka-wah since he appreciates the latter's leadership skills and his own ailing health due to cardiomegaly.
- Dick Wei as Fat Hoi's Vietnamese henchman and hitman.
- Philip Ko as Eagle Fei (鷹飛), a leader of the Sheung Wan triad who colludes with Fat Hoi.
- Tin Ching as Ho (何伯), Kiu's grandfather
- Sin Ho-ying as Beardy Ho (鬍鬚浩), Fat Hoi's chief henchman.
- Wan Seung-lam as Fat Hoi's henchman.
- Shan Chin-po as Brother Hung (阿洪), Fai's underling who attempts to extort protection fee from Ka-wai.
- Tony Tam as a policeman
- Lee Sau-kei as Ka-wah and Ka-wai's father.
- Yee Tin-hung
- San Sin
- Cheung Kwok-wah as 'Pau (炮灰泉), a triad leader from the Netherlands and an ally of Fei.
- Paul Wong as a lion dancer at Ka-wah and Kiu's wedding
- Chow Kong
- Cho Wing
- Lau Chun-fai as a policeman who uses brutality on Fai.
- Hau Woon-ling as Ka-wah and Ka-wai's mother.
- Steve Mak
- Yau Kwok-keung as Advisor So (師爺蘇), Fat Hoi's advisor.
- Ng Kwok-kin
- Yiu Mei-kei
- Choi Kwok-keung
- Ling Chi-hung
- Chun Kwai-po as an armoured car security guard.
- Wong Ka-leung as Brother Hung's thug.
- Ho Chi-moon
- Fan Chin-hung
- Mak Wai-cheung as a policeman
- Wong Chi-wah as Fat Hoi's underling in the fight at the banquet.
- Ridley Tsui
- Ha Kwok-wing
- Chang Sing-kwong
- Chan Yuet-yue
- Chung Wing
- Cheung Ping-chuen
- Lam Chi-tai
- Wong Wai-tong
- Ho Wing-cheung

== Box office ==
The film grossed HK$5,940,788 during its theatrical run 7 to 20 January 1989 in Hong Kong.

== See also ==
- Andy Lau filmography
- List of Hong Kong Category III films
