= Touch and Go (1991 film) =

1991 Hong Kong film by Ringo Lam

- Film poster
- Traditional Chinese: 一觸即發
- Simplified Chinese: 一触即发
- Hanyu Pinyin: Yī Chù Jí Fā
- Jyutping: Jat1 Zuk1 Zik1 Faat3
- Directed by: Ringo Lam
- Screenplay by: Nam Yin; Chau Ting
- Produced by: Nam Yin
- Starring: Sammo Hung; Irene Wan; Wan Yeung-ming; Teresa Mo
- Cinematography: Ardy Lam
- Edited by: Chow Tung-nei
- Music by: Noel Quinlan
- Production companies: Silver Medal Presentations; Born Top Productions
- Distributed by: Golden Harvest
- Release date: 16 May 1991
- Running time: 97 minutes
- Country: Hong Kong
- Language: Cantonese
- Box office: HK$4,323,530

Touch and Go, also known as Point of No Return (Chinese: 一觸即發), is a 1991 Hong Kong action thriller film directed by Ringo Lam and starring Sammo Hung.

== Plot ==
Police officer Pitt's (Wan Yeung-ming) partner Lau was killed by the triads. The case also involves the seizure of a number of pornographic photos of politicians from an earlier investigation. The murder was witnessed by chef Fat Goose (Sammo Hung), and Pitt forces him to be the eyewitness and have the killer arrested. The killer, Lam Man-fu (Tommy Wong), however, was bailed out by his lawyer Kam Tse-ping (Lam Chung) and Pitt's superior Keung (Lau Kong) also forbids him from interfering with this case. At this time, Fat Goose's house was also torched and was determined to cooperate with Pitt to tackle the triads.

== Cast ==
- Sammo Hung as Fat Goose
- Irene Wan as May
- Wan Yeung-ming as Pitt
- Teresa Mo as Angel
- Tommy Wong as Lam Man-fu / God of Hell
- Ann Mui as Lulu
- Lam Chung as Kam Tse-ping
- Billy Chow as Ping's kicking thug
- Lau Kong as Keung Sir
- Terrence Fok as Fireball
- Victor Hon as Bau Shing-tze
- Law Lan as Goose's mother
- Cheng Siu-ping as Friend of Goose's mother
- Frankie Ng as Hell's thug with knife
- Ho Yik-ming
- Chan Chi-fai as Hell's thug with knife
- Yan Chung-wai
- Lee Wah-kon
- Simon Cheung as Policeman
- Lee Kwong-tim

== Box office ==
The film grossed HK$4,323,530 at the Hong Kong box office during its theatrical run from 16 to 22 May 1991 in Hong Kong.
