= Dial D for Demons =

2000 Hong Kong film by Billy Tang

- DVD cover art
- Traditional Chinese: 炭燒兇咒
- Simplified Chinese: 炭烧凶咒
- Hanyu Pinyin: Tàn Shāo Xīong Zhòu
- Jyutping: Taan3 Siu1 Hung1 Zau3
- Directed by: Billy Tang
- Written by: Rico Chung
- Produced by: Billy Tang; Rico Chung
- Starring: Jordan Chan; Joey Meng; Lee Ann; Terence Yin; Alice Chan; Winnie Leung
- Cinematography: Tony Miu
- Edited by: Robert Choi
- Music by: Jonathon Wong
- Production company: Golden Harvest
- Release date: 18 March 2000
- Running time: 84 minutes
- Country: Hong Kong
- Language: Cantonese
- Box office: HK$1,053,486

Dial D for Demons (Chinese: 炭燒兇咒; lit. 'Burning Charcoal Curse') is a 2000 Hong Kong horror film directed by Billy Tang, starring Jordan Chan, Joey Meng, Lee Ann, Terence Yin, Alice Chan, and Winnie Leung.

== Plot ==
A group of six youngsters travel to Lantau Island for a holiday in a vacation villa. The place meets their expectations, but strange things start happening once they step into the house. One of them, Big Bully, has the ability to see ghosts and spirits, and he senses imminent danger. Before he can warn his friends, he is found dead inside his room. The others are shocked and attempt to leave the place but the roads always lead back to the house and the neighbouring houses have disappeared mysteriously too. They have no choice but to spend the night in that ghostly villa. Shortly later, their pagers start beeping and they receive messages that they are going to die at different times. The house seems to have a life of its own and eventually the five of them are separated from each other, with four of them meeting their deaths at the hands of a charcoal demon. The last one, Gabriel, encounters the spirit of Big Bully (her boyfriend), and they try to unravel the mystery together. Gabriel manages to survive the night until dawn as the sole survivor of the entire incident. She boards the ferry back to the mainland, but once she overhears the ferry's passengers talking about the incident, she transforms into the demon. It turns out that the demon has killed her as well because the newspaper reveals that all six have been found dead.

== Cast ==
- Jordan Chan as Big Bully
- Joey Meng as Gabriel
- Lee Ann as Pently
- Terence Yin as PJ
- Alice Chan as Sammie
- Winnie Leung as May

== Release ==
Dial D for Demons was released in Hong Kong on 18 March 2000. It grossed a total of HK$1,053,486.
