= Those Were the Days... (1995 Hong Kong film) =

1995 Hong Kong film by Billy Tang

- DVD cover
- Directed by: Billy Tang Hin-Shing
- Screenplay by: Wong Ho-Wa; Chan Wa; Raymond Lee
- Story by: Peter Chan; Lee Siu-kei
- Produced by: Raymond Wong
- Starring: Francis Ng; Bowie Lam; Maggie Siu
- Cinematography: Anthony Pun
- Edited by: Poon Hung
- Production company: Filmax Production Co. Ltd.
- Release date: 22 April 1995
- Running time: 91 minutes
- Country: Hong Kong
- Language: Cantonese

Those Were the Days... (Chinese: 慈雲山十三太保) is a 1995 Hong Kong movie directed by Billy Tang Hin-Shing.

== Cast and roles ==
- Francis Ng - Yu
- Bowie Lam - Wah
- Maggie Siu - Ling
- Power Chan - Safe-Box
- Moses Chan - Ko Fai
- Kent Cheng - Chan's Father
- Ka-Kui Ho - Brother Wing / Devil Siu
- Victor Hon - Food Stall Owner
- Lee Siu-kei - Triad Boss
- Man Yee-Man - Kiddy
- Eric Moo - Chan Wah
- Kirk Wong - Big Nose
- Bobby Yip - Ugly Guy
