= Daughter of Darkness (1993 film) =

1993 Hong Kong film by Kai-Ming Lai

- Hong Kong theatrical release poster
- Directed by: Kai-Ming Lai
- Written by: Kai-Ming Lai
- Starring: Lily Chung; Monica Lo; Anthony Wong
- Cinematography: Kin Keung Lee
- Release date: 28 October 1993
- Running time: 96 minutes
- Country: Hong Kong
- Language: Cantonese

Daughter of Darkness (Chinese: 滅門慘案之孽殺; pinyin: miè mén cǎn àn zhī niè shā; Jyutping: mi6 mun4 caam2 on3 zi1 jit6 saat3) is a 1993 Hong Kong Category III horror-crime film directed by Kai-Ming Lai. The film was released on 28 October 1993 in Hong Kong and was considered to be a sleeper hit. It stars Lily Chung as a young teenager who is suspected of murdering her family after years of enduring horrific abuse by them.

The film was followed with two sequels, the 1994 films Daughter of Darkness 2 (Mie men can an II jie zhong) and Brother of Darkness (Ti tian xing dao: Sha xiong).

== Synopsis ==
In a small village in China, a beautiful young seamstress, Mak Wei-Fong (Lily Chung), arrives at a police station to report the mass murder of her family. The police detective, Leoi Gei (Anthony Wong), investigates the murder and learns that both of Mak's parents have been shot to death. He finds that the bullets used are the type that only a police officer would carry. He immediately suspects Mak's boyfriend, Gin, who is a young police officer. When confronted by Detective Leoi, Gin confesses to the crime without hesitation and is placed under arrest. However, because of Gin's quick admission and confession as well as failing to provide details of the crime, Detective Leoi suspects that Gin may be sacrificing himself in order to protect the true culprit who used his weapon.

Mak soon arrives at the police station, confessing that she in fact is the murderer. During the interrogation, Mak reveals that her home life was abusive. She states that both of her parents (played by Ka-Kui Ho and Daisy) were promiscuous and each had many affairs outside of their marriage. In addition, Mak may not be her father's biological child, but a product of one of her mother's adulterous affairs. Further, her siblings were unsympathetic and provided no family support. Mak tells Detective Leoi that Gin's comfort and love had given her the strength that her family could not provide.

The detective learns that Mak and Gin had been planning to get married and move to Hong Kong. He continues with his interrogation, during which Mak explains that she had been raped by her own father, and her family had known but had done nothing. Mak's father had attempted to blackmail her by threatening to tell Gin about the rape. After returning home from work, Mak attempted to kill her father with a pair of scissors. She hoped to silence him, but failed and he overpowered her. Then, Mak's father retaliated by tying Mak up, stripping her naked, and sodomizing her. Gin arrived in time to witness this, became enraged and beat the father, but stopped short of murdering him, in large part due to his training as a policeman.

When Gin ceased fighting with Mak's father and turned his attention to Mak, Mak's father regained consciousness, sneaked up on Gin and knocked him unconscious. During this struggle, Mak successfully grabbed Gin's gun and shot and killed her father. She then killed the rest of her family as they arrived home.

The court sentences Mak to the death penalty, which is in accordance with the Chinese law. Mak gives birth to a baby girl in prison; the identity of the baby's father is ambiguous due to the time of conception. Gin and the baby arrive to say goodbye as Mak meets her fate, leaving them both heartbroken as they watch her die.

== Cast ==
- Anthony Wong as Captain Lui
- Yuk-kwan Chan
- Lily Chung as Mak Wei-Fong
- Daisy as Fong's Mother
- Biu Gam as (as Piao Chin)
- Ka-Kui Ho as Wei-Fong's Father
- Si Man Hui as Gossiping Woman
- Lo Hung as Ping
- Wong Kam Hung as Gambling House Suspect
- William Ho Ka-Kui as Papa Mak
- Che Kau-Wa as Policeman
- Wan-fei Lee as Villager at Police Station
- Kai Chi Leung as Fung

== Reception ==
HorrorNews.net gave a favorable review, but warned that the movie contained some content that could be unsettling for some viewers.
