= Chinese Midnight Express =

1997 Hong Kong film by Billy Tang

- DVD cover
- Traditional Chinese: 黑獄斷腸歌之砌生豬肉
- Simplified Chinese: 黑狱断肠歌之砌生猪肉
- Hanyu Pinyin: Hēi Yù Duàn Cháng Gē Zhī Qì Shēng Zhū Ròu
- Jyutping: Hak1 Jeok6 Dyun6 Ceong4 Go1 Zi1 Cai3 Saang1 Zyu1 Jeok6
- Directed by: Billy Tang
- Screenplay by: Candy Cheng; Lee Siu-kei
- Story by: Lee Siu-kei
- Produced by: Lee Siu-kei
- Starring: Tony Leung Chiu-wai; Pinky Cheung; Ng Man-tat; Ben Lam; Ben Ng; Elvis Tsui
- Cinematography: Tony Miu
- Edited by: Robert Choi
- Music by: Lincoln Lo
- Production companies: Cameron Entertainment; The Young Filmmakers
- Distributed by: Cameron Entertainment
- Release date: 15 November 1997
- Running time: 102 minutes
- Country: Hong Kong
- Language: Cantonese
- Box office: HK$6,492,060

Chinese Midnight Express is a 1997 Hong Kong crime drama film directed by Billy Tang. Set in the 1960s, the film stars Tony Leung Chiu-wai as a righteous journalist who gets framed and jailed after exposing the collusion between the corrupt police force and triads.

== Cast ==
- Tony Leung Chiu-wai as Ching On
- Pinky Cheung as Jess
- Ng Man-tat as Brother Plane
- Ben Lam as Miu Yan-sing
- Ben Ng as Inspector Cheung Yiu-cho
- Elvis Tsui as Three Legs
- Lee Siu-kei as Brother Nam
- Frankie Ng as Brother Doggie
- John Ching as Brother Bill
- Raven Choi as Brother Wai
- Bowie Lau
- Sung Boon-chung as Lok
- Wan Yeung-ming as Inspector Wan Chi-ho
- Law Kar-ying as warden
- Lee Lik-chi as MP
- Peter Lai as Uncle Kin
- Wong Shu-tong as On's boss
- Lai Suen as On's mom

== See also ==
- Midnight Express (film)
