= The 33D Invader =

2011 Hong Kong film by Cash Chin

- Directed by: Cash Chin
- Written by: Sean Chan
- Produced by: Cash Chin
- Starring: Macy Wu; Chen Chun-yan; Akiho Yoshizawa; Taka Kato
- Cinematography: Ross Clarkson
- Edited by: Lee Kar-wing
- Music by: Kenneth Tjon; Lin Ka-chun
- Production company: My Way Film
- Distributed by: My Way Film
- Release date: 6 October 2011 (Hong Kong)
- Running time: 82 minutes
- Country: Hong Kong

The 33D Invader (蜜桃成熟時33D) is a 2011 Hong Kong science fiction sex comedy film directed by Cash Chin. The film stars Macy Wu (whose bust size is exactly 33D, thus the name) as a girl named Future who has to re-populate the human race after radiation attacks from the Xucker race have made 99% of men on Earth infertile in the year 2046. The film was released in Hong Kong on 6 October 2011 and was shown at Far East Film Festival in Udine. The film has received negative reviews.

== Plot ==
A young woman named Future (Macy Wu) is sent from the year 2046 to the year 2011 in Hong Kong. Future was sent by the United Nations in order to get pregnant, so she can then extract the genes and repopulate the Earth, as 99% of males have become infertile in the future due to attacks from Planet Xucker. Two assassins from Xucker (Taka Kato and Ya-wen Hseh) are sent after her to stop her. The assassins can turn people into sex zombies. Some of her friends got turned into zombies and they were turned against her. Future meets three university students: Felix (Justin Cheung), Dan-san (Andrew Kwok) and Sing (Tsui Ho-cheong). The men are obsessed with female students next door: Chin-chin (Akiho Yoshizawa), Chen-chen (Monna Lam) and Sai-sai (Chen Chih-ying). The students agree to help Future find a mate at the university.

== Production ==
The film has an international cast with Chinese actress Macy Wu as Future, Taiwanese male lead of Chen Chun-yan as the lead role of Long and two Japanese AV idols (Akiho Yoshizawa as Chin-chin and Akiho and Taka Kato as a Xucker male assassin. Despite the film title, it is not a 3D film.

Chinese model Macy Wu stated she took on the role of Future as she felt director Cash Chin "filmed women in a beautiful way". Wu reportedly beat model Mavis Pan to the role.

== Style ==
The 33D Invader's director Cash Chin is known for creating Category III sexploitation films in Hong Kong such as Sex & Zen II (1996) and the sequels to the film Crazy Love. Derek Elley of Film Business Asia described the style of The 33D Invader as "a harmless, silly-arse Cantonese youth comedy with lots of nudity and a couple of gross-out visual gags". A review in Twitch Film described the first half of the film as "a typical eighties student sex comedy, "Porky's" style" and that the science fiction "girl-from-the-future plot only kicks in when the film reaches its halfway point".

== Release ==
The film was released theatrically in Hong Kong on 6 October 2011. The film was screened at the 14th Udine Far East Festival in Italy in 2012. The film grossed a total of $302,387 in Hong Kong where it peaked at the fourth highest-grossing film in the region on its second week of release.

A Blu-ray Disc of the film was released in Region A by Kam & Ronson. The disc contains Cantonese and Mandarin languages and English subtitles.

== Reception ==
Film Business Asia gave the film a rating of three out of ten, calling it a "Lame softcore sex comedy" and that the best thing about the film apart from the lead of Macy Wu was "the title". A review from Twitch Film opined that it was "a pretty terrible film" but stated that the character's (portrayed by Akiho Yoshizawa and Chen Chih Ying) "willingness...to disrobe at the slightest provocation, and occasionally even to cause provocation, makes the film a not all-together arduous experience."
