= Eight Immortals Restaurant murders =

1985 mass killing in Portuguese Macau

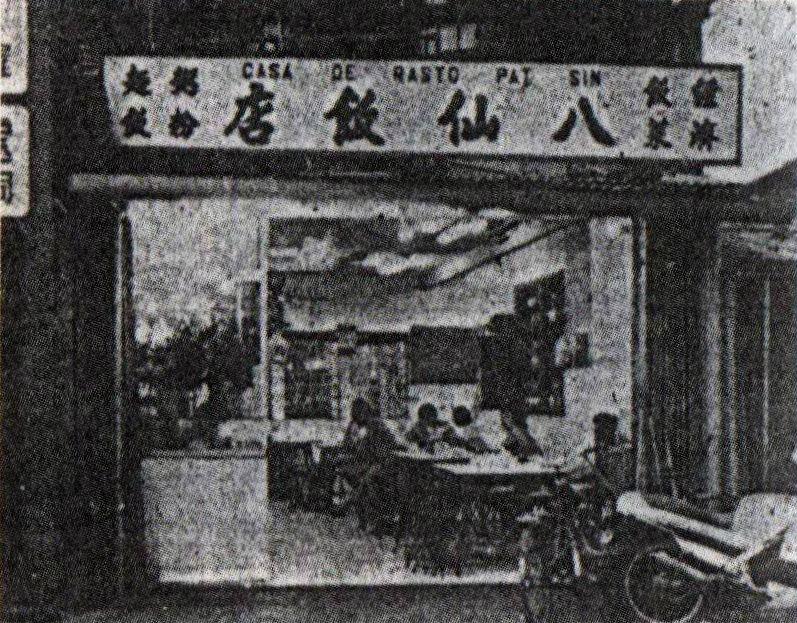
- Newspaper photograph of the Eight Immortals Restaurant, circa 1984
- Location: Iao Hon, Portuguese Macau (present-day Macau, China)
- Date: 4 August 1985; 9:10 p.m.
- Target: Zheng family
- Attack type: Mass murder; mass stabbing
- Weapon: Broken glass bottle
- Deaths: 10
- Perpetrator: Huang Zhiheng
- Motive: Unpaid gambling debts

On 4 August 1985, ten members of the Zheng family were murdered in the Eight Immortals Restaurant in Portuguese Macau. The perpetrator, Huang Zhiheng, had attacked the family at their business over unpaid gambling debts by restaurant owner Zheng Lin. After stabbing or strangling each of the victims to death, Huang dismembered their bodies and disposed of their remains in the ocean and dumpsters.

Huang was arrested in September 1986, over a year after the murders, having taken over and operated the Zheng family's restaurant during this time. He was convicted and sentenced to several prison terms the following month. Huang killed himself in prison only weeks after starting his sentence in December 1986.

== Background ==
=== Eight Immortals Restaurant ===
The Eight Immortals Restaurant (Chinese: 八仙飯店, Portuguese: Casa de Rasto Pat Sin) was a Chinese restaurant in the Iao Hon section of Nossa Senhora de Fátima parish in Macau, then a Portuguese colony. The modest dining establishment, connected to the Eight Immortals Hotel, was owned and operated by Zheng Lin (鄭林), a former street hawker who had moved his business from a stand into a formal restaurant in the 1960s. Zheng lived near his restaurant with his family, who helped him run the business. The restaurant was a financial success, but Zheng and his wife were noted to be heavy gamblers.

=== Huang Zhiheng ===
Huang Zhiheng (simplified Chinese: 黄志恒; traditional Chinese: 黃志恆, sometimes spelled Huang Chih-heng) was born in Mainland China as Chen Ziliang (simplified Chinese: 陈梓梁; traditional Chinese: 陳梓梁) before emigrating to British Hong Kong, in the 1970s. In 1973, Huang murdered a man over a debt at his victim's home in Quarry Bay. He fled to Guangzhou, where he cut off the tip of his left index finger and burned his fingerprints in an attempt to avoid being linked to the murder. After living in Guangzhou for several years, Huang married a woman surnamed Li, who was the daughter of his landlord. Li's family disapproved of the marriage, so the couple eloped to Macau. Huang subsequently became involved in Macau's gambling scene, becoming acquainted with the Zhengs in the process. Huang was aged around 50 at the time of this encounter.

During one evening of gambling in 1984, Huang and Zheng became involved in a series of high stakes bets against each other. In the end, Huang won 180,000 patacas (or US$20,000) from Zheng and his wife. The Zhengs were unable to pay the debt, so a verbal agreement was made that the Zheng family would cede their restaurant's mortgage to Huang if the debt was not repaid within one year. Huang agreed. The family remained indebted after this year. Huang would later claim that not only had the family failed to repay him but continued to lose money in further bets, allegedly owing a total of 600,000 patacas (or US$75,047).

== Murders ==
The Zheng family were last seen alive by a delivery man on the afternoon of 4 August 1985. That evening, after the restaurant had closed, Huang entered the establishment and demanded that the family pay 30,000 patacas (he later claimed that he dropped his demand to 20,000 patacas) of the debt they owed him. Huang grew increasingly agitated when Zheng Lin refused to turn over ownership of the restaurant. Eventually, Huang became physically aggressive, taking Zheng's son hostage and forcing the other eight family members to bind and gag each other. Huang later claimed that one family member broke free and started to scream, causing him to stab her in the neck with a broken bottle he had brandished as a weapon. He then proceeded to kill all nine family members, either by strangulation or with the bottle. He briefly left the restaurant to lure one of Zheng's sisters inside, where he killed her as well.

Huang dismembered the bodies over the course of eight hours and wrapped them in plastic trash bags, which he then dumped into the ocean or threw into dumpsters. Afterwards he cleaned the restaurant, recovered some money and a safe key from Zheng's corpse, and spent the night at Zheng's nearby residence. The next morning, the delivery man found the restaurant locked, with a note on the door stating that it would be closed for three days. The delivery man visited the Zheng residence, where Huang answered the door and claimed the family had taken a trip to the mainland.

On 8 August 1985, a swimmer found eight pieces of human limbs in Hac Sa Beach. (Note: Hac Sa Beach's name (zh:黑沙海灘) in Cantonese means "black sand"; coincidentally, and perhaps confusingly, the Eight Immortals Restaurant was located in close proximity to a neighborhood on the Macau Peninsula named Areia Preta (zh:黑沙環), which in Portuguese also means "black sand".) It was originally theorised that the body parts came from a group of illegal immigrants from the mainland who had been eaten by sharks, but an examination of the limbs revealed that precise cuts had been used to sever them. This finding prompted a police investigation and a search for potential missing persons. Over the next few days, forensic evidence determined that the limbs belonged to at least four separate people. A further three body parts were found on local beaches over the following week. These findings generated significant interest in the press, and several theories were raised as to what had happened.

Eventually, Macau police traced the severed limbs to the Zheng family, who had been reported missing by relatives. Meanwhile, Huang reopened and continued to operate the restaurant; this was considered unusual but not unwarranted, as he was known to associate with the family and was in possession of the restaurant's ownership documents. He also began collecting rent from the family's former home. Police grew suspicious of Huang and searched his bank holdings, finding documents belonging to Zheng and student ID cards belonging to his children. Huang attempted to flee for the mainland but was captured on 28 September 1986. He was convicted of ten counts of murder on 2 October 1986. Huang's arrest, and the fact that he had continued to run the restaurant after dismembering its former owners, resulted in the urban legend that he had baked his victims into pork buns. The final body parts to be linked to the murders were found in a trash dump in 1989.

== Victims ==
- Zheng Lin, over 50 years old, owner of the restaurant
- Chen Huiyi, 42, wife of Zheng
- Natalia Zheng Baoqiong, 18, eldest daughter of Zheng
- Stefani Zheng Baohong, 12, second daughter of Zheng
- Zoey Zheng Baowen, 10, third daughter of Zheng
- Joanna Zheng Baohua, 9, fourth daughter of Zheng
- Antonio Zheng Guande, 7, only son of Zheng
- Chen Lirong, 70, mother of Chen
- Chen Zhen (also known as Chen Lizhen), 60, ninth aunt of Chen
- Zheng Boliang, 61, chef and Zheng Lin's older cousin

== Aftermath ==
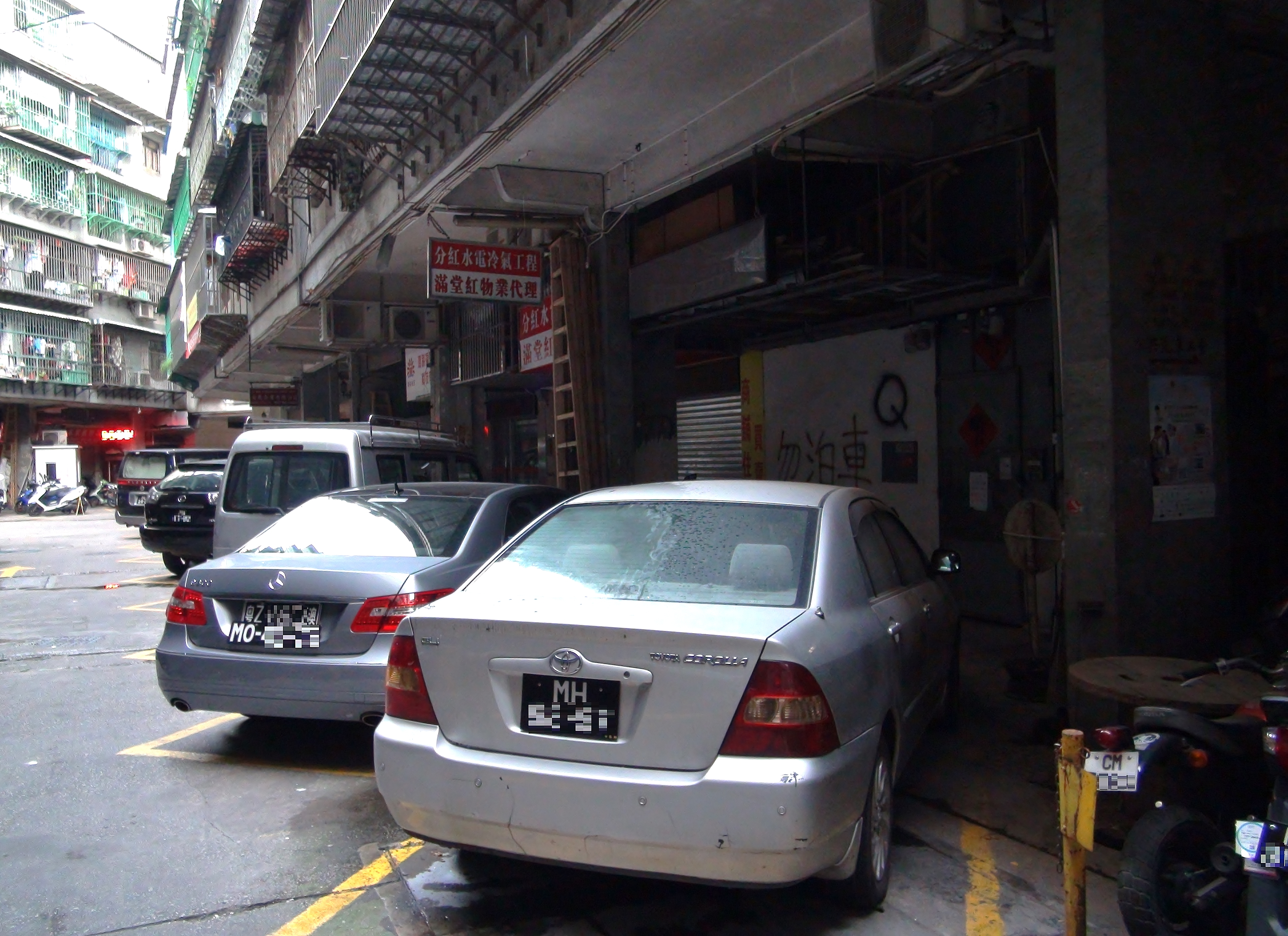
The former Eight Immortals Restaurant in 2015.

Huang was attacked in prison by another inmate on the day after his conviction. He was sent to a hospital to convalesce, where he attempted to escape without success. On 6 October, Huang confessed and detailed to investigators how and why he had killed the Zheng family. His second and fatal suicide attempt took place on 4 December 1986, when he managed to cut his wrists with a bottle cap. Huang left a suicide note and a letter to a local newspaper, stating in his note that his suicide was not due to his crimes but rather to escape his chronic asthma. After his death, what was left of his fingerprints linked him to the 1973 murder in Hong Kong.

The recovered remains of the Zheng family were later cremated, and the ashes scattered off the coast of Macau by relatives.

After Huang's arrest, the restaurant was immediately closed and seized by police. It was resold by early 1987 and has seen different owners in recent years. Today, the former restaurant and the apartments above it are part of Baxian Hotel.

== Media coverage ==
The events surrounding the Eight Immortals Restaurant murders were depicted in the 1993 Hong Kong movie The Untold Story featuring Anthony Wong. The film featured a fictionalized version of the murder of the Zheng family, and notably played upon the rumors that cannibalism had occurred after the murders. In China, the film was also released under the names The Human Pork Bun and Human Meat Roast Pork Buns.
