= Lee Siu-kei =

Hong Kong actor (1949–2019)

Keith Lee Siu Kei
- Born: 4 December 1949; British Hong Kong
- Died: 2 June 2019 (aged 69); Hong Kong
- Occupation: Actor
- Years active: 1991–2019

Chinese name
- Chinese: 李兆基
Transcriptions
Standard Mandarin
- Hanyu Pinyin: Lǐ Zhàojī

Lee Siu-kei (Chinese: 李兆基; 4 December 1949 – 2 June 2019) was a Hong Kong actor, scriptwriter and producer. He was a triad member and served as consultant for many Hong Kong triad movies.

Lee left organized crime after being invited to act by director Ringo Lam in the 1980s. Lee along with Shing Fui-On, Ho Ka-kui, and Kwong Leung Wong were known as the "top four villains of the Hong Kong film industry" due to their prominence in the 1980s and 1990s. Lee was referred to as "基哥" or "Brother Kei".

Lee suffered a stroke in early 2015, which affected his mobility. Afterwards, his involvement in the entertainment industry declined. He admitted he had financial problems, as most of his life savings had been used for medical treatment.

== Personal life ==
Lee married Yau Hau Ching, his girlfriend of 30 years, in February 2019.

On 2 June 2019, Lee died of liver cancer in Queen Elizabeth Hospital at the age of 69. He was survived by his wife, brother, and sister.

== Selected filmography ==
- God of Gamblers II (1991)
- Fist of Fury 1991 (1991)
- Raped by an Angel (1993)
- The Heroic Trio (1993)
- Those Were the Days... (1995)
- They Don't Care About Us (1996)
- Feel 100% (1996)
- Young and Dangerous (1996)
- Young and Dangerous 3 (1996)
- Rebekah (1996)
- God of Cookery (1996)
- Hold You Tight (1997)
- Those Were the Days (1997)
- Young and Dangerous 4 (1997)
- Full Alert (1997)
- Lawyer Lawyer (1997)
- Chinese Box (1997)
- We're No Bad Guys (1997)
- Chinese Midnight Express (1998)
- The Lucky Guy (1998)
- Young and Dangerous 5 (1998)
- Portland Street Blues (1998)
- Young & Dangerous: The Prequel (1998)
- The Storm Riders (1998)
- King of Comedy (1999)
- The Legendary 'Tai Fei' (1999)
- Those Were the Days... (2000)
- Jiang hu: The Triad Zone (2000)
- Love Undercover (2002)
- Himalaya Singh (2005)
- Flirting Scholar 2 (2010)
- Life Without Principle (2011)
- Turning Point 2 (2011)
- The White Storm (2013)
