= Irene Wan =

Hong Kong actress and singer

- 溫碧霞
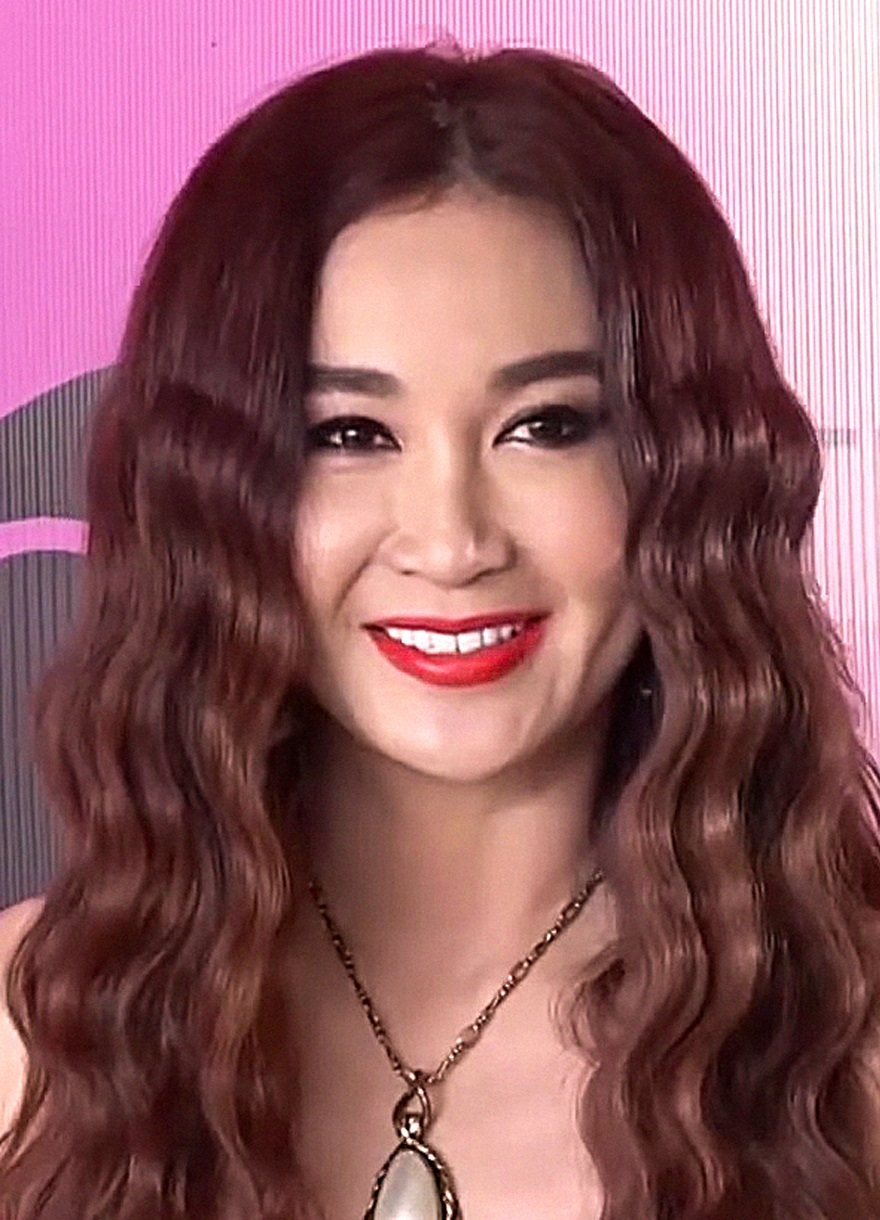
- Wan in 2020
- Born: Wan Bik-ha; 30 July 1966 (age 60); Tiu Keng Leng, Tseung Kwan O New Town, New Territories, British Hong Kong
- Education: Catholic Ming Yuen Secondary School
- Occupations: Actress; singer; producer
- Agents: TVB (1991–2001); Emperor Motion Pictures (Hong Kong) (from 2012); Huayi Brothers (Chinese mainland) (from 2012)
- Height: 1.64 m (5 ft 5 in)
- Spouse: Kenneth Ho (m. 2000)
- Children: 1 (adopted)
- Awards: Golden Lotus Award at 3rd Macau International Movie Festival in 2011 (Best supporting actress)
- Musical career
- Labels: Homerun (1991–1993); Yiu Wing RECORDS LIMITED (1993); Yong Sheng He Chuang Media (2008); Mele Music 北京美樂文化 (from 2012)

Chinese name
- Traditional Chinese: 溫碧霞
- Simplified Chinese: 温碧霞
Transcriptions
Standard Mandarin
- Hanyu Pinyin: Wēn Bìxiá
Yue: Cantonese
- Yale Romanization: wan1 bik1 ha4

Irene Wan Bik-ha (born Wen Bik-ha on 30 July 1966) is a Hong Kong actress, singer and producer. Her father was an officer of the Republic of China Army. In her early years, she was known as a "sexy beauty". After her marriage, Wan faded out of the entertainment industry and occasionally participated in dramas and films. She is currently based in mainland China.

== Early life and career ==
She was born and lived in District 8 of Rennie's Mill squatter district in the New Territories of Hong Kong. She is the youngest of four brothers and three sisters. Growing up her family was poor. Her father had been an officer of the Republic of China (Kuomintang) Army and settled in Hong Kong after fleeing Mainland of China. The artist Chen Yulian was her next door neighbor, and Wang Xiaofeng was also the neighbor below her residence. When Irene Wan was a child, she often played with boys in the same district, mainly playing table tennis and badminton with them. She once attended Mingyuan Primary School and enjoys music and fine arts. Later, in order to want her to enroll in a better secondary school, her mother arranged for her to continue her studies in a secondary school on Hong Kong Island (Note: The information about Irene Wan's childhood and schooling comes from the interview of the Hong Kong Radio No. 2 radio program "Shou Xia Liu Qing" broadcast on 5 June 2018.).

After completing the first grade at Catholic Mingyuan Middle School, Irene Wan went to the former St. John's College for Co-Education in Tai Koo Shing. During the latter's schooling period, she was a member of the school's basketball team. She moved to Shau Kei Wan to live with her sister in order to facilitate schooling when she was 12 years old. She was sold by her mother because of her poverty. Because of his father's strict discipline, she developed a rebellious character. "When I was in middle school, I learned to smoke, go to the dance hall (P field) and make friends with problem teenagers". Later, when she was 15 years old (1983), she was discovered by scouts on the street to participate in the filming of the movie "Lonely Fifteen" and joined the entertainment circle. She had not graduated from high school at the time (Note: The information about Irene Wan's family background and her middle school period comes from the 1008th issue "Single Interview·Forever Haichao Irene Wan" published on 21 November 2014.).

She was nominated for the Hong Kong Film Award for Best New Performer at the 2nd Hong Kong Film Awards for her role in Lonely Fifteen.

She gained attention for her performance in Everlasting Love (1984), in which she co-starred with Andy Lau and Loletta Lee, at the age of 17. She later appeared in Stanley Kwan's Love Unto Waste (1986) and Rouge (1988).

However, in the 1990s, her film career sputtered when she agreed to star in All of a Sudden (1996), which would be her first and only time appearing fully nude in a film. Wan later went on to star in several TVB television series.

In 2019, at the age of 53, Wan drew controversy for her suggestive scenes with two younger actors in the thriller The Fallen (the male actor being 14-year-old younger than Wan and the female actress 27 younger). Her performance in the film would later eventually won her the Best Actress in a Leading Role award at the 8th Silk Road International Film Festival in 2020.

== Personal life ==
Wan married Kenneth Ho (何祖光), a wealthy Hong Kong businessman, on 1 October 2000. Their wedding was held at Banyan Tree Hotel in Phuket, Thailand. Ho is the grandnephew of the Kuomintang veteran He Yingqin and worked at Solomon Brothers Hong Kong Asia Pacific Investment as the Vice President of the Banking Department. The two have never planned to have children until 2010 when Wan and her husband adopted an orphan who was abandoned in a train station in Mainland China. They also sought a doctor to cure his skin disease and cough, and renamed the child to Xavier Ho (何國倫).

== Filmography ==
- Lonely Fifteen (靚妹仔) (1982) (Hong Kong) – Irene/Xia Nu
- Happy Sixteen (俏皮女学生) (1982) (Hong Kong) – Da Yan Zi
- Possessed (猛鬼出籠) (1983) (Hong Kong) – Irene (Hsiao's Sister)
- 101 Citizen Arrest (101拘捕令) (1983 – 1984, TV Series) (Hong Kong) – Irene
- Pom Pom (神勇雙響炮) (1984) (Hong Kong) – Koo's Prostitute
- Everlasting Love(停不了的爱) (1984) (Hong Kong) – Liang Peijun
- Lucky Stars Go Places (最佳福星) (1986) (Hong Kong) – Lady Officer
- Love Unto Waste (地下情) (1986) (Hong Kong) – Ruan Bei Er
- Caper (警贼兄弟) (1986) (Hong Kong) – Annie San Fun
- Rouge (胭脂扣) (1988) (Hong Kong) – Cheng Shuxian
- Lai Shi, China's Last Eunuch (中國最後一個太監) (1988) (Hong Kong) – Zhao Di
- Tiger Cage (特警屠龙) (1988) (Hong Kong) – A Mei
- Ruthless Law (法律无情) (1988) (Hong Kong) – Huang Peiyan
- Bloody Brotherhood (同根生) (1989) (Hong Kong) – He Jiao (Jiahua's wife)
- The Wild Ones (我未成年) (1989) (Hong Kong) – Chen Yuqin
- Hearts, No Flowers (少女心) (1989) (Hong Kong) – Li Xiangyun
- Armageddon (城市判官) (1989) (Hong Kong) – Yang Min
- Running Mate (追女重案组) (1989) (Hong Kong) – Lin Luoxin
- Fatal Vacation (安乐战场) (1990) (Hong Kong) – Candy
- The Sniping (奇兵) (1990) (Hong Kong) – Elaine
- Fragrance Soul (香魂) (1990) (Hong Kong)
- The Fugitives (末路狂奔) (1991, TV Series) (Hong Kong) – Huang Xiaoying
- Touch and Go (一触即发) (1991) (Hong Kong) – May
- The Tigers (五虎将之决裂) (1991) (Hong Kong) – Shirley Lam
- Heartbreak Blues (與郎共舞) (1991, TV Series) (Hong Kong) – Jiang Qingzhao
- In The Lap of God (蛮荒的童话) (1991) (Hong Kong) – May Tse
- Now You See Love, Now You Don't (我爱扭纹柴) (1992) (Hong Kong) – Canoe Girl
- Vengeance (火玫瑰) (1992, TV Series) (Hong Kong) – Haichao
- The Knight and the Concubine (唐朝妖姬) (1992, TV Series) (Hong Kong) – Dong Er
- Twilight of the Forbidden City (告別紫禁城) (1992) (Hong Kong) – Zhao Di
- Class of '93 (爱生事家庭) (1992 – 1993, TV Series) (Hong Kong) – Liang Huan
- Just Gold Modern Woman (鎮金女人週記：三職新女性) (1993, TV Series) (Hong Kong) – Joanne (appears in episode 8)
- Man of the Times (一代梟雄: 三支旗) (1993) (Hong Kong) – Guo Qiuju
- Labor revenge (1993) (Hong Kong)
- Mr. Sardine (沙甸鱼杀人事件) (1994) (Hong Kong) – Bei An Na
- Circus Kids (马戏小子) (1994) (Hong Kong) – Xiao Lan
- Gentle Reflections (恨锁金瓶) (1994, TV Series) (Hong Kong) – Pan Jinlian
- Just Gold Modern Woman II (鎮金女人週記（第二輯）：告別霓虹) (1994, TV Series) (Hong Kong) – Mo Qiqi (Vicky) (appears in episode 5)
- The Flame and the Fiancee (倒數七日情) (1995) (Hong Kong) – Cat
- Justice Pao (包青天) (1995 – 1996, TV Series) (Hong Kong) – Zi Tong/Tong Fei (appears from episode 71 to episode 75)
- All of a Sudden (惊变) (1996) (Hong Kong) – Miao Ke Yi/Lam Ho Yee
- Take to Probity (反貪風暴) (1997, TV Series) (China) – Bai Xue
- Shigong Qi An Danyuan Ju III (施公奇案單元劇：血手印) (1997, TV Series) (Taiwan) – Qin Meiniang (appears from episode 13 to episode 19)
- Against the Blade of Honour (圓月彎刀) (1997, TV Series) (Hong Kong) – Qin Keqing
- Shigong Qi An Danyuan Ju XXVII (施公奇案單元劇：審妻記) (1997, TV Series) (Taiwan) – Li Huiniang (appears from episode 146 to episode 150)
- Shigong Qi An Danyuan Ju XLIV (施公奇案單元劇：犬父龍子) (1998, TV Series) (Taiwan) – Xie Xuezhen (appears from episode 263 to episode 272)
- Burning Harbor (燃烧的港湾) (1998) (Hong Kong) – Xu Meili
- The End of Love Generation (恋恋琼瑶) (1999) (Hong Kong)
- Scary Scorpse (屍前想後) (2000) (Hong Kong) – Wen Wen
- Tequila Sunrise (火龍女) (2001) (Hong Kong) – Coco
- Kang San Lau (江山楼) (2001, TV Series) (Taiwan) – Jin Bao/A Chun/Yan Chun
- Situation change (风云变) (2001, TV Series) (Hong Kong) – Ruan Kaiwei
- Gods of Honour (封神榜) (2001, TV Series) (Hong Kong) – Su Daji
- A Tragic Room (斗室96小時) (2003) (Hong Kong) – Luo Ping
- Di xie Wenshen (滴血纹身) (2003, TV Series) (China) – Ouyang Yiyun
- The Happiness of Family Reunion (2004) (Hong Kong) – Jiang Wan Shu
- Magic Needle (幻影神針) (2005, TV Series) (China) – Liu Langyue
- The Spirit of Nu River (怒江魂) (2005) (China) – Na Shan
- Records of Kangxi's Travel Incognito season 5 (康熙微服私访记5) (2006, TV Series) (China) - Concubine Yi (Yi Fei - Yi Feng Er)
- Exodus (出埃及記) (2007) (Hong Kong) – Pan Xiaoyuan
- Yang Xiong and Shi Xiu (楊雄与石秀) (2010) (China) - Pan Qiaoyun
- The Loan Shark (大耳窿) (2011) (Malaysia) - Chen Xin (A Xin)
- 72 Heroes (英雄喋血) (2011) (China and Hong Kong) - Jiang Meixi
- The Drunkard (酒徒) (2011) (Hong Kong) – Wang taitai (Mrs. Wang)
- Triad (2012) – Irene
- Impetuous Love in Action (2014) – Irene
- Love in Late Autumn (2015) – Linda Wen
- 708090 (2016) – Zhao Yuan Yuan
- Across The Ocean To See You (2017) – Melinda Zheng
- Guardian Angel 2018 Web Drama (2018) – Sister Mi (appears in episode 14–16)
- The Fallen (2019) – Fu Yu Yu
- My Dear Destiny (2020, TV Series)

== Discography ==
=== Studio albums ===
#	Title	Type	Publisher	Release date	Repertoire
1	溫碧霞	Cantonese Album	全壘打（Hong Kong）	September 1991	Repertoire: 1. 遠方的期待; 2. 美女與野獸; 3. Baby Don't Go（TVB "Heartbreak Blues" theme song）; 4. 蒼天不許（TVB "The Fugitives" theme song）; 5. 初戀情人; 6. Stranger in the Nite; 7. 寂寞吧（午夜愛人）; 8. 藍色的風; 9. Baby Don't Go (Reprise); 10. 希盼得好夢（The theme song of the movie "Prison on Fire II"）; 11. 美女與野獸（Reprise）
2	海潮	Cantonese Album	全壘打（Hong Kong）	July 1992	Repertoire: 1. 森巴嘉年華（Post-transition version）; 2. 午夜浮動; 3. 曾經愛過（Chorus by Cai Jiwen (蔡濟文), TVB "Vengeance" episode）; 4. 海潮（TVB "Vengeance" theme song）; 5. 只因這是愛（I Need You）; 6. 月亮代表我的心; 7. Boogie Night; 8. 離别彩虹; 9. 曾經愛過（Music version）; 10. 單身貴族; 11. 森巴嘉年華（High Mix）
3	水的個性	Cantonese Album	全壘打（Hong Kong）	December 1992	Repertoire: 1. 某一個晚上; 2. 飛花（TVB "The Knight and the Concubine" theme song）; 3. 夢化粧; 4. 痴心; 5. 半生緣; 6. 水的個性; 7. 忘掉我自己; 8. 香檳; 9. 凍結情感; 10. 飛花（Music version）
4	海潮 新曲+精選	New song + selection	全壘打（Hong Kong） New Century Workshop (HK)	1993	Repertoire: 1. 森巴嘉年華（Post-transition version）; 2. 海潮（TVB "Vengeance" theme song）; 3. 曾經愛過（Chorus by Cai Jiwen (蔡濟文), TVB "Vengeance" episode）; 4. 美女與野獸; 5. 蒼天不許（TVB "The Fugitives" theme song）; 6. Baby Don't Go（TVB "Heartbreak Blues" theme song）; 7. Stranger in the Nite; 8. 某一個晚上; 9. 半生缘; 10. 痴心; 11. Boogie Night; 12. 水的個性; 13. 飛花（TVB "The Knight and the Concubine" theme song）; 14. 希盼得好夢（The theme song of the movie "Prison on Fire II"）; 15. 月亮代表我的心; 16. 調景嶺之歌（New song）
5	情無後悔	Cantonese Album	耀榮唱片（China	November 1993	Repertoire: 1. 情無後悔; 2. 單身咖啡座; 3. 迷人小雨傘下; 4. 愛有代價; 5. 多一點愛，多一點痛; 6. 着了迷; 7. Don't Leave Me Tonight; 8. 心裡有夢想; 9. 戀愛未來; 10. 生命原是為着愛
6	掙扎	Mandarin EP	創音社（Taiwan）	1999	Repertoire: 1. 掙扎; 2. 別誤會; 3. 窩心話; 4. 守住自己守住你; 5. 解脱; 6. 掙扎（Music version）; 7. 別誤會（Music version）; 8. 窩心話（Music version）; 9. 守住自己守住你（Music version）; 10. 解脱（Music version）
7	美麗人生	Mandarin EP	九洲音像（China）	February 2008	Repertoire: 1. 一千萬個擁抱; 2. 西湖遐想曲; 3. 掃心地; 4. 一千萬個擁抱（激情版）; 5. 我真的受傷了
8	我愛的你不在身邊	Mandarin EP	美樂文化（China）	29 August 2012	Repertoire: 1. 我愛的你不在身邊; 2. 夢醒之後; 3. 我真的受傷了
9	海潮（3"CD）（限量編號版）	Small dish	全壘打（Hong Kong） New Century Workshop (HK)	12 May 2015	Repertoire: 1. 海潮; 2. 森巴嘉年華; 3. Baby Don't Go; 4. 水的個性; 5. 希盼得好夢
10	海潮 新曲+精選 （Reprint）	New song + selection	全壘打（Hong Kong） New Century Workshop (HK)	24 May 2019	Repertoire: 1. 森巴嘉年華（Post-transition version）; 2. 海潮（TVB "Vengeance" theme song）; 3. 曾經愛過（Chorus by Cai Jiwen (蔡濟文), TVB "Vengeance" episode）; 4. 美女與野獸; 5. 蒼天不許（TVB "The Fugitives" theme song）; 6. Baby Don't Go（TVB "Heartbreak Blues" theme song）; 7. Stranger in the Nite; 8. 某一個晚上; 9. 半生缘; 10. 痴心; 11. Boogie Night; 12. 水的個性; 13. 飛花（TVB "The Knight and the Concubine" theme song）; 14. 希盼得好夢（The theme song of the movie "Prison on Fire II"）; 15. 月亮代表我的心; 16. 調景嶺之歌（New song）

=== Singles ===
- 1994：《一醉化千愁》(Theme song of TVB TV series Gentle Reflections)
- 2020：《Make You Smile》

=== Concerts ===
- 19 June 2018：《Irene Wan Haichao Concert2018》

== Song scores ==
Top position of the four songs on the chart
Record	Song	903	RTHK	997	TVB	Remarks
1991
溫碧霞	希盼得好夢	–	–		–	The theme song of the movie Prison on Fire II; Repertoire of the same song: Chen Baiqiang (陳百強) ~ 今宵多珍重
溫碧霞	Stranger in the Nite	–	–		–	
溫碧霞	美女與野獸	–	–		–	
溫碧霞	Baby Don't Go	30	–		–	TVB TV series Heartbreak Blues episode
1992
海潮	海潮	–	–		6	TVB TV series Vengeance theme song
海潮	月亮代表我的心	25	–		–	
海潮	森巴嘉年華	6	–		–	
水的個性	水的個性	15	–		–	
水的個性	飛花	–	–		–	TVB TV movie The Knight and the Concubine theme song
1993
情無後悔	情無後悔	–	–		–	
情無後悔	心裡有夢想	26	–		–	
情無後悔	單身咖啡座	21	–		–	OT：Donna De Lory ~ Think It Over
2012
我愛的你不在身邊	我真的受傷了	–	–	–	–	翻唱張學友作品
2020
	Make You Smile	–	–	15	6	

Total number of champion songs in each station
903	RTHK	997	TVB	Remarks
0	0	0	0	Total number of four champion songs: 0

== Awards and nominations ==
=== Hong Kong Film Awards ===
Year	Awards ceremony	Awards	Film	Result
1983	The 2nd Hong Kong Film Awards	Best New Actress	Lonely Fifteen	Nominated

=== Macau International Film Festival ===
Year	Awards ceremony	Awards	Film	Result
2011	The 3rd Macau International Film Festival	Golden Lotus Award for Best Supporting Actress	72 Heroes	Won
2013	The 5th Macau International Film Festival	Best Supporting Actress Award	Triad	Nominated
2015	The 7th Macau International Film Festival	Best Actress Award	Love in Late Autumn	Nominated

=== Silk Road International Film Festival ===
Year	Awards ceremony	Awards	Film	Result
2020	The 8th Silk Road International Film Festival	Best Actress in a Leading Role	The Fallen	Won
