= Just Heroes =

1989 Hong Kong film by John Woo and Wu Ma

- Film poster
- Directed by: John Woo; Wu Ma
- Written by: Ni Kuang; Hau Chi-Keung
- Produced by: Chang Cheh; Tsui Hark
- Starring: Danny Lee; David Chiang; Chen Kuan-tai; Wu Ma; James Wong; Stephen Chow; Ti Lung
- Cinematography: Cho Wai-Kei; Yee Tung-Lung
- Edited by: Robert Choi
- Music by: James Wong; Romeo Diaz; Sherman Chow
- Production company: Magnum Films
- Distributed by: Golden Princess Amusement
- Release date: 14 September 1989
- Running time: 97 minutes
- Country: Hong Kong
- Languages: Cantonese; Mandarin
- Box office: HK$7,913,229

Just Heroes (Chinese: 義膽群英) is a 1989 Hong Kong action-crime film, directed by John Woo and Wu Ma. The film stars Danny Lee, David Chiang and Stephen Chow.

== Plot ==
Following the death of a triad leader, there is conflict within the Hong Kong organised crime syndicate as various possible leaders vie for power. Pak Wai attempts to bring the traitor in the midst of his own group to justice following a taped conversation of traitor admitting his crimes, but who cannot be found, while Sou, the elected leader of the triad has his family attacked as he fights unknown enemies to bring the organisation back under control. Their actions are hindered by Jacky who is attempting to build up anger between the two completing triads of Hong Kong. The film is brought to a bloody conclusion as the traitor leader of the group storms the triad safe house in a desperate attempt to gain control over the group, but is met by heavy resistance.

== Cast ==
- David Chiang as Cheung Pak Wai
- Danny Lee as Sou
- Chen Kuan Tai as Tai
- Tien Niu as Annie, Sou's wife
- Cally Kwong as Tai's wife
- Wu Ma as Ma
- James Wong as Solicitor Wong
- Stephen Chow as "Jacky" Yuen Kei-hao
- Shing Fui-On as Wah
- Nie Jun
- Ti Lung as Loon
- Yueh Hua as Mr.Elliot

== Production ==
Just Heroes began production as a benefit for the Hong Kong Director's Union. The film was made to aid director Chang Cheh, who was broke. When actors Danny Lee and David Chiang found out about Chang's financial situation, they developed the story Just Heroes, which was made to be similar to the film A Better Tomorrow. John Woo directed about 60% of the film.

== Release ==
Just Heroes was released on 14 September 1989. The film was not a major financial success in Hong Kong, making HK$7,913,229 and coming in 48th place in the year end box office. All the money from the film was given to Chang Cheh so he could retire. Rather than using it as retirement funds, Chang used the money to direct another film.
