= Lily Chung =

Hong Kong actress born 1964

Lily Chung Suk Wai (鍾淑慧) born April 4, 1964 (62 age) is a Hong Kong actress and beauty pageant titleholder. she graduated from University of Hong Kong.

She represented Hong Kong at the Miss Universe 1987 pageant. She worked for TVB until 1993. She is married to actor Hugo Ng (吳岱融).

== Filmography ==
- The Infernal Fighter (2004)
- Be Out Control (2003)
- Blood on Bullet (2003)
- Killing Betrayer (2003)
- Snake Lover (2003)
- Teenage Gambler (2003)
- We're No Heroes (2003)
- Dangerous Relationship (2002)
- Deadline Crisis (2002)
- Deadly Past (2002)
- Dragon the Master (2002)
- Final Edge (2002)
- Home Ghost (2002)
- Killing Skill (2002)
- Shadow Mask (2001)
- Spy Gear (2001)
- The Story of Freeman (2001)
- Fatal Attraction (2000)
- Legend of Wind (2000)
- Pursuit of a Killer (2000)
- Millennium Dragon (1999)
- No Time for Two (1999)
- The Hero of Swallow (1996)
- The Wild Couple (1996)
- Die Harder (1995)
- The Eternal Evil of Asia (1995)
- Husbands & Wives (1995)
- Midnight Caller (1995) (cameo)
- O.C.T.B. Case : The Floating Body (1995)
- A Step to Heaven (1995)
- The Woman Behind (1995)
- Brother of Darkness (1994)
- Fatal Encounter (1994)
- Fatal Obsession (1994)
- The Modern Love (1994)
- Red to Kill (1994)
- The Bride with White Hair 2 (1993)
- Daughter of Darkness (1993)
- Supernormal II (1993)
- The Rapist Beckons (1992)
- The Zu Mountain Saga (1991)
- Midnight Angel (1990)
