= Possessed II =

1984 Hong Kong film by David Lai

- Directed by: David Lai
- Written by: John Au
- Produced by: Johnny Mak
- Starring: Mabel Kwong; Siu-Fung Wong; Yu-Lung Hsiao
- Cinematography: Gary Ho; Raymond Lam
- Edited by: Kung-Wing Fan
- Music by: Mahmood Rumajahn
- Production company: Johnny Mak Productions
- Release date: November 16, 1984 (Hong Kong)
- Running time: 99 minutes
- Country: Hong Kong
- Languages: Cantonese; Mandarin; English

Possessed II (艷鬼發狂) is a 1984 Hong Kong film directed by David Lai. It is preceded by Possessed in 1983.

== Synopsis ==
A bar waitress lived with her boyfriend and gave birth to a baby boy called Paul. Seven years later, her boyfriend abandoned the family and never returned. Out of rage, the bar waitress committed suicide and killed Paul too. Thirty years later, new residents move in the house while knowing nothing about its history. When they get settled, strange things start to happen...

== Cast ==
- Mabel Kwong as Macy Ho
- Siu-Fung Wong as Michelle (as Siu-fung Wong)
- Yu-Lung Hsiao as Inspector Siu (as Gary Siu)
- Ha-Wai Wong as Susan
- Jayson Case as Hare Krishna
- Huang Chin as Uncle Li
- Tien-Nan Tan as Uncle Fook
