= Money Lo =

Hong Kong actress

Money Lo Man Yee (盧敏儀) is a Hong Kong actress.

== Filmography ==
- Web of Deception (1997) - Candy
- Mr. Mumble (1996) - Mistress of Ceremonies
- 100 Ways to Kill Yourself (1996) - Cardin
- On Fire (1996)
- Banana Club (1996)
- Infatuation (1995)
- O.C.T.B. Case: The Floating Body (1995) - Yin Li
- Brother of Darkness (1994)
- Red to Kill (1994) (as Man Yee Lo) - Ka Lok Cheung
- All's Well, Ends Well Too (1993) - Snow White's Servant
- Remains of a Woman (1993) - Television Reporter in Green
- Daughter of Darkness (1993) - Dong Huan
- Path of Glory (1989)
- Mr. Fortune (1989)
- Police Story (1985) - Television Interviewer
- Joi geen sup gao sui (1983) TV Series
