= Possessed (1983 film) =

1983 Hong Kong film by David Lai

- Traditional Chinese: 猛鬼出籠
- Jyutping: maang5 gwai2 ceot1 lung4
- Directed by: David Lai
- Written by: John Au
- Produced by: Johnny Mak Tong-Hung
- Starring: Yu-Lung Hsiao; Siu-Ming Lau; Irene Wan
- Cinematography: Robert Thompson
- Distributed by: Fortune Star Media Limited
- Release date: 9 January 1983
- Running time: 84 minutes
- Country: Hong Kong
- Language: Cantonese
- Box office: $6,147,104.00

Possessed (猛鬼出籠) is a 1983 Hong Kong film directed by David Lai. It is followed by Possessed II in 1984.

== Plot ==
An insane man is shot dead by two cops Kung and Hsiao after he refused to listen to them and stabbed a woman dead. After that, the two cops always meet strange things and Hsiao's girl friend is also haunted too. In order to reduce the fear, the cops employ a Taoist to find out the problem. After several enchantments, the Taoist discovers the truth: As Hsiao's father was involved in some corruption that led to a death. Now the spirit of the victim has returned from hell for revenge.

== Cast ==
- Siu Yuk-Lung (1) – Siu Yuk Lung
- Lau Siu-Ming – Lau Siu Ming
- Irene Wan Pik-Ha – Siu's sister
- Tai San (1) – Leong Hsia
- Chan Chi-Shui – Sue
- Wong Yat-Fei – Master Chen
- Sham Ching-Mei – Lin Chin Shui's mother
- San Sin – Priest
- Chan Wai-Yue – Wang Tso Yi's wife
- Chan Fung-Bing – Auntie San
- Chui Yi – Hsiao Yau Tim
- Lee Wan (2) – Ms Hung
- Kobe Wong Kam-Bo – Priest
- Ng Kit-Keung – Wang Tso Yi
- Law Man-Hon – Ming's superior officer
- John Chan – Boyfriend of Siu's sister
