= Red to Kill =

1994 Hong Kong film by Billy Tang

Red to Kill 弱殺
- DVD cover
- Directed by: Billy Tang Hin-Shing
- Written by: Wong Ho Wa
- Produced by: Kimmy Shuen (aka Suen Ging On)
- Starring: Lily Chung; Money Lo; Ben Ng
- Cinematography: Tony Miu
- Edited by: Choi Hung
- Music by: Jonathon Wong Bong
- Production company: Martini Film Company Ltd.
- Distributed by: Mandarin Films Distribution Co. Ltd.
- Release date: 20 October 1994
- Running time: 91 minutes
- Country: Hong Kong
- Language: Cantonese
- Box office: HK$9.476 million (Hong Kong)

Red to Kill (Chinese: 弱殺; pinyin: ruò shā) is a 1994 category III Hong Kong horror film directed by Billy Tang Hin-Shing.

== Cast and roles ==
- Lily Chung - Ming-Ming Yuk Kong
- Money Lo - Ka Lok Cheung, the social worker
- Ben Ng - Chi Wai Chan
- Bobby Yip - Mental patient
