= All of a Sudden (1996 film) =

1996 Hong Kong film by Herman Yau

- DVD Cover
- Traditional Chinese: 驚變
- Simplified Chinese: 惊变
- Hanyu Pinyin: Jīng Biàn
- Jyutping: Ging1 Bin3
- Directed by: Herman Yau
- Screenplay by: Chau Ting
- Story by: Nam Yin
- Produced by: Nam Yin
- Starring: Simon Yam; Irene Wan; Alfred Cheung; Dayo Wong
- Cinematography: Puccini Yu; Sander Lee; Paul Yip; Stephen Poon
- Edited by: Chan Kei-hop
- Music by: Mak Chun Hung
- Production company: Nam Yin Production
- Distributed by: Mandarin Films Distribution Co. Ltd.
- Release date: 14 June 1996
- Running time: 97 minutes
- Country: Hong Kong
- Language: Cantonese
- Box office: HK$7,533,230

All of a Sudden is a 1996 Hong Kong crime mystery film directed by Herman Yau and starring Simon Yam and Irene Wan.

== Plot ==
An erotic mystery about a widower who seeks revenge against the man who had an affair with the widower's wife before her apparent suicide. However, things soon turn complicated when the widower begins a relationship with the man's wife.

== Cast and roles ==
- Simon Yam as Tsui Chin-tung
- Irene Wan as Lam Ho-yee
- Alfred Cheung as Lam Kwok-chiu
- Dayo Wong as Detective Guy Mak
- Peter Ngo as Bill Chan
- Tsang yin as Stella Tsui
- Lam Chiu-wing as Drunk driver
- Rico Chung as Driver in accident
- William Leung as Ming
- Lee Chi-kei as Solicitor Chan
- Joe Chu as Lam Kwok-choi's hired thug
- James Tsim
- Stephen Poon
- Kerrick Wong as Hard Rock Cafe staff
- Fong Yue as Sister Sam
- Wong Ka-on as Baby Lam
- Tam Wing-san as Uncle Wong
- Lo Hung as Security guard
- Mak On-luk as Policewoman

== See also ==
- List of Hong Kong films
