= Billy Tang =

Hong Kong film director (died 2020)

- 鄧衍成
- Born: 1950 or 1951
- Died: 2 July 2020 (aged 69)
- Occupation: Film director

William Tang Hin-Shing (Chinese: 鄧衍成) (died 2 July 2020) was a Hong Kong film director.

Tang first entered the industry in 1979, working as an assistant director for Asia Television. He was involved in a number of popular productions, including 'Reincarnated', 'Dragon Strikes' and 'Agency 24', and was eventually promoted to director in 1982.

On 2 July 2020, Tang died at age 69.

== Filmography ==
- Dragon Fight (1989)
- Dr. Lamb (1992)
- Deadly Desire (1993)
- Run and Kill (1993)
- Brother of Darkness (1994)
- Red to Kill (1994)
- Revenge of the Kung Fu Master (1994)
- Those Were the Days... (1995)
- Sexy and Dangerous (1996)
- Street Angels (1996)
- Streets of Fury (1996)
- Wild (1996)
- Chinese Midnight Express (1997)
- Haunted Karaoke (1997)
- Web of Deception (1997)
- Casino (1998)
- Raped by an Angel 5 : The Final Judgement (2000)
- Dial D for Demons (2000)
- Sharp Guns (2001)
- Devil Touch (2002)
- Interactive Murders (2002)
- Death Trip (2015)
