= The Tragic Fantasy—Tiger of Wanchai =

1994 Hong Kong film by Stephen Lo and Joe Chu

- DVD cover
- Traditional Chinese: 醉生夢死的灣仔之虎
- Simplified Chinese: 醉生梦死的湾仔之虎
- Hanyu Pinyin: Zuì Shēng Mèng Sǐ De Wān Zăi Zhī Hǔ
- Jyutping: Zeoi3 Sang1 Mung4 Sei2 Dik1 Waan1 Zai2 Zi1 Fu2
- Directed by: Stephen Lo; Joe Chu
- Screenplay by: Ng Lak-kwong; Leung Yan-tung; Lo Sing
- Produced by: Stephen Lo
- Starring: Simon Yam; Lau Ching-wan; Wan Yeung-ming; Roy Cheung; Charine Chan; Mariane Chan; Yvonne Yung
- Cinematography: Peter Ngo
- Edited by: Poon Hung
- Music by: Tommy Wai; Tats Lau
- Production company: Regal Films
- Distributed by: Regal Entertainment; Modern Films and Entertainment
- Release date: 19 August 1994
- Running time: 106 minutes
- Country: Hong Kong
- Language: Cantonese
- Box office: HK$11,067,166

The Tragic Fantasy—Tiger of Wanchai is a 1994 Hong Kong action crime thriller film directed by Stephen Lo and Joe Chu and starring Simon Yam, Lau Ching-wan, Wan Yeung-ming and Roy Cheung. The film is based on the life of Sun Yee On triad member Andely Chan (portrayed in the film by Yam), nicknamed the "Tiger of Wan Chai", who was murdered in Macau in November 1993.

== Plot ==
Chan Yiu-hing (Simon Yam) possess adept driving skills and works as a car jockey alongside his friends Hung (Wan Yeung-ming), Chung (Roy Cheung) and Dee (Lau Ching-wan). Because Dee was a compulsive gambler, he owed a large amount of gambling debt to Lam Kwok-yeung (Ben Lam), a triad leader of the Wan Chai district and was badly beaten by Lam. In order to pay for Dee's debt, Hing and his friends steal Lam's car and has thus forged a rivalry. On the other hand, Hing becomes obsessed with a girl named Miu (Mariane Chan), whom he had only met once. When the two meet again, they become a couple, while Hung also becomes a couple with Miu's friend Fanny (Charine Chan). Hing feels that his strength is weak and becomes involved in the debt collection field, where his influence becomes stronger. However, glory does not last long as many triad leaders were unhappy with Hing expanding his business and lures Hing into the drug business, which Hing refuses. When Hing goes to Macau to participate an auto race, the footsteps of assassins approach step by step closer.

== Cast ==
- Simon Yam as Chan Yiu-hing
- Lau Ching-wan as Dee
- Wan Yeung-ming as Hung
- Roy Cheung as Chung
- Charine Chan as Fanny
- Mariane Chan as Miu
- Yvonne Yung as Kitty
- Chik King-man as Mandy
- Ben Lam as Lam Kwok-yeung
- William Ho as Uncle Bill
- Lo Lieh as Uncle Kui
- Ku Feng as Uncle Kau
- Victor Hon as Sing
- Johnny Tang as Race car driver in opening
- Jack Wong as Uncle Bill's thug who forces Kitty to drink
- Jameson Lam as Lam Kwok-yeung's thug
- Johnny Cheung as Lam Kwok-yeung's thug
- Fong Yue as Fanny's mother
- Wong Yung as Noisy karaoke bar patron
- Kwan Yung as Uncle Bill's thug
- Hoh Wah
- Ho Chi-moon
- Lam Kwok-kit
- John Cheung
- Leo Tsang
- Yu Ming-hin
- Woo Pin-yue
- Law Wai-kai
- Christoper Chan as Thug
- Tony Tam as Thug
- So Wai-nam as Thug
- Chu Tat-kwong as Thug
- Cheung Siu as Party guest
- Benny Lai as Man in shootout
- Wu Zhan-peng as Man in shootout
- Jacky Cheung Chun-hung as Thug
- Lui Siu-ming

== Reception ==
=== Critical ===
Love HK Film gave the film a mixed review praising Simon Yam's performance and the story as "sporadically entertaining, but also overdirected to the point of distraction."

=== Box office ===
The film grossed HK$11,067,166 at the Hong Kong box office during its theatrical run from 19 August to 16 September 1994.
