= My Wife's Lover =

1992 Hong Kong film by Kevin Chu

- Video cover
- Traditional Chinese: 太太的情人
- Simplified Chinese: 太太的情人
- Directed by: Kevin Chu
- Written by: Kevin Chu; Lan Chau
- Produced by: Kevin Chu
- Starring: Chik King Man; Vincent Lam
- Cinematography: Kevin Chu
- Edited by: Lam Man-Ban
- Music by: Ben Cheung
- Production company: Tai Seng Entertainment
- Release date: 9 January 1992 (Hong Kong)
- Running time: 83 minutes
- Country: Hong Kong
- Language: Cantonese

My Wife's Lover (Chinese: 太太的情人) is a 1992 Hong Kong romantic drama film directed by Kevin Chu.

== Plot ==
Wife Joanne (Chik King Man) and husband Alan (Vincent Lam) are both dissatisfied with their marriage and sex life. Alan employs a photographer Terry (Maria Tung Ling). Terry and Joanne proceed to have an affair.

== Cast ==
- Chik King Man - Joanne
- Maria Tung Ling - Terry
- Vincent Lam - Alan

== See also ==
- Ab-normal Beauty
- Pang brothers
