= Kirk Wong =

- Born: 王正權 (Jyutping: Wong4 Zeng3 Kyun4); March 28, 1949 (age 77); Hong Kong
- Years active: 1981–2002; 2012–present

Chinese name
Transcriptions
Standard Mandarin
- Hanyu Pinyin: Wáng Yǔ
Yue: Cantonese
- Jyutping: Wong4 Jyu5
- Musical career
- Also known as: Che-Kirk Wong; Kirk Wong Chi-keung

Kirk Wong (黃志強; born March 28, 1949) is a Hong Kong film director and actor. Wong is best known for action films Crime Story and The Big Hit. Wong's other films like Health Warning, Organized Crime & Triad Bureau, and Rock N'Roll Cop have gained admiration from fans of action films.

== Career ==
=== Acting ===
Wong's roles in the 1980s included Sergeant Sam Liang in Danger Has Two Faces (1985), Inspector Lau in Legacy of Rage, and Inspector Philip Chan in Forever Young (1989) (not to be confused with the Steve Miner directed, Mel Gibson starring 1992 film of the same name).

His roles in the 1990s included Dai Anfen in God of Gamblers II (1990), Crazy Bull in Twin Dragons (1992), and Yuan Pa Tien in The Mad Monk (1993), as well as a cameo appearance in Police Confidential (1995).

=== Filmmaking ===
Wong made his directing debut with the 1981 film The Club, alongside Michael Chan and Kent Cheng. In 1983, Wong directed the film Health Warning, starring Johnny Wang, Eddy Ko and Elvis Tsui.

In 1993, Wong directed the film Crime Story starring Jackie Chan, followed by Organized Crime & Triad Bureau and Rock N'Roll Cop a year later (both films starring Anthony Wong Chau Sang). Wong made his American directing debut in 1998 film The Big Hit along with Mark Wahlberg and Lou Diamond Phillips. In 2000, Wong directed the TV film The Disciples starring Ice-T.

In 2002, Wong announced his retirement from the film industry at the age of 53.

In June 2012, Wong directed his first film in over a decade.

== Filmography ==
=== As actor ===
- Danger Has Two Faces (1985)
- Legacy of Rage (1986)
- Just Like Weather (1986)
- Long Arm of the Law II (1987)
- I Love Maria (1988)
- The Big Heat (1988)
- The Truth (1988)
- Fury (1988)
- Forever Young (1989)
- The Yuppie Fantasia (1989)
- Long Arm of the Law III (1989)
- Path of Glory (1989)
- Fatal Bet (1989)
- Casino Raiders (1989)
- The Fortune Code (1990)
- God of Gamblers II (1990)
- Big Brother (1990)
- Shanghai Shanghai (1990)
- Shanghai 1920 (1991)
- Twin Dragons (1992)
- The Mad Monk (1993)
- Fait Accompli (1994)
- Crystal Fortune Run (1994)
- Those Were the Days (1995)
- Police Confidential (1995)
- Kung Fu Jungle (2014)
- Mrs K (2017)

=== As director ===
- The Club (1981)
- Health Warning (1983)
- Lifeline Express (1985)
- True Colours (1986)
- Gunmen (1988)
- Forsaken Cop (1990)
- Story of a Gun (1991)
- Taking Manhattan (1992)
- Crime Story (1993)
- Organized Crime & Triad Bureau (1994)
- Rock N'Roll Cop (1994)
- The Big Hit (1998)
- The Disciples (2000) (TV movie) (credited as Alan Smithee)
