= Run and Kill =

1993 Hong Kong film by Billy Tang

- DVD cover
- Traditional Chinese: 烏鼠：機密檔案
- Hanyu Pinyin: Wū shǔ: jīmì dàngàn
- Directed by: Billy Tang
- Written by: Bryan Chang
- Produced by: Kimmy Suen; Ng Kwok Kuen
- Starring: Simon Yam; Danny Lee; Esther Kwan; Kent Cheng
- Cinematography: Tony Miu
- Edited by: Robert Choi
- Music by: Jonathon Wong
- Production company: Come On Film Co.
- Release date: 27 February 1993
- Running time: 90 minutes
- Country: Hong Kong
- Language: Cantonese

Run and Kill (Chinese: 烏鼠：機密檔案; pinyin: Wū shǔ: jīmì dàngàn) is a 1993 Hong Kong crime-thriller exploitation film directed by Billy Tang. The film follows Fatty Cheung (Kent Cheng), a businessman who accidentally places a hit on his cheating wife, causing an escalating spiral of violence with the police (who believe him to be the killer) and the criminal organization (who want money for carrying out the hit).

== Cast ==
- Kent Cheng
- Simon Yam
- Danny Lee
- Esther Kwan
