= The Rape After =

1984 Hong Kong film by Tom Lau

- 淫種
- Directed by: Tom Lau
- Screenplay by: Tom Lau
- Starring: Melvin Wong; Hung-yu Tsiang; Yau-hau Chan
- Cinematography: Tom Lau
- Edited by: K.K. Chiang
- Music by: Siu-lam Tang
- Production company: Europa Film Enterprises Company
- Release date: 10 May 1984

The Rape After (Cantonese: 淫種, romanized: Yin zhong, lit. 'Dirty species') is a 1984 Hong Kong horror film directed by Tom Lau Moon-Tong. The film is about a sleazy photographer who steals a cursed statue which inadvertently releases a demon. The demon rapes and impregnates a young model. The photographer believes he has impregnated the women, and tries to get her to a provider of illegal abortion services where the demon appears.

== Production ==
The Rape After was directed by veteran cinematographer Tom Lau who was also the film's cinematographer and screenwriter. The film's soundtrack includes cues lifted from the films Sorcerer, Star Trek II: The Wrath of Khan and Blade Runner.

== Release ==
The Rape After was released on May 10, 1984.

== Reception ==
From retrospective reviews, John Charles, in his book The Hong Kong Filmography awarded the film a 7 out of 10, declaring it as "one of the best HK horror films" noting that it was well directed by Tom Lau and that "the film's no-nonsense approach and gruesome make-up add greatly to its impact." In the magazine Gick, Scott Aaron Stine noted that the monster effects of the demon and a baby monster "leave much to be desired" but that "the remainder of the production values are decent, with an engaging script to hold all the chaos together" declaring the film to be "One of the more engaging Hong Kong supernatural shockers." in the same magazine, Michael von Sacher Masoch in the same publication found certain scenes to be more funny than scary and that the film was "Slow and uneventful, no matter what Scott tries to tell you."
