= Hong Kong motion picture rating system =

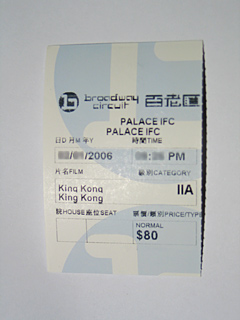
A movie ticket in Hong Kong indicating the rating of King Kong.

The Hong Kong motion picture rating system (Chinese: 香港電影分級制度; Jyutping: hoeng1 gong2 din6 jing2 fan1 kap1 zai3 dou6) is a legal system of movie screening and rating. An official government agency issues ratings for any movie that will be shown in Hong Kong cinemas.

== History ==
In 1986, with the release of John Woo's violent gangster movie A Better Tomorrow (later rated IIB), the general public became concerned about the influence films had on children. As a result, the Hong Kong motion picture rating system was established under the Movie Screening Ordinance Cap.392 on 10 November 1988. The purpose behind the law was to provide parents of minors a chance to prevent their children from being exposed to inappropriate materials, as well as to allow people to watch movies with content aimed towards adults.

The ratings were previously issued by the Office for Film, Newspaper and Article Administration, and initially provided three levels of ratings, which led the slang term "three-tier ratings" (三級制) to popular usage.

In 1995, the ratings were amended, creating three levels of main ratings, and two sub-ratings for one level.

The Hong Kong government revisioned the Film Censorship Ordinance guidelines for censors on 11 June 2021. The new guidelines stipulate that if the content of a film to be shown violates the Hong Kong national security law, the censor shall conclude that the film is not suitable for exhibition.

== Legal requirements ==
According to the laws of Hong Kong, any movies that are intended to be shown in Hong Kong cinemas or released to the public via any videotape or disc formats must be screened by the Office for Film, Newspaper and Article Administration. The Office will then permit the movie to be released under their assessed level rating. Movie trailers intended to be shown inside the cinema hall or in cinema lobbies must also be submitted for classification. Only still films exhibited for non-commercial purposes (cultural, educational, instructional, promotional or religious) are exempt.

If a movie is rated as a Third Level film (三級片), its promotional materials must also be screened by the Office for Film, Newspaper and Article Administration. In addition, any videotape or discs that will be sold must be sealed by plastic bagging before it can be sold.

The Board of Review consists of ten members and nine other persons who are not public officers. Members act as "censors" and review submitted films for classification. Film distributors or any person who disagrees with the censors may request the Board to review that decision.

Under the Film Censorship Ordinance, the Film Censorship Authority may appoint persons to be film censorship advisers as needed, usually for a one-year term. Once every two weeks, panel members are invited to preview films along with the censors and provide their views on film classification. The panel of advisers currently has 300 members, including teachers, social workers, professionals, housewives, and college students.

== Ratings system ==
Image	Text
Level I	Category I: Suitable for All Ages (適合任何年齡人士觀看) Self explanatory.
Level II	Category II: Not Suitable for Children (兒童不宜) (pre-1995 legacy rating) The Government suggests parental guidance when watching the film. This rating is now divided into levels and.
Level II-A	Category IIA: Not Suitable for Children (兒童不宜) The Government advises parents that some content may be inappropriate for children. Parental Guidance is advised.
Level II-B	Category IIB: Not Suitable for Young Persons and Children (青少年及兒童不宜) The Government strongly advises parental guidance when watching the film for young persons and children.
Level III	Category III: Persons Aged 18 and Above Only (只准18歲或以上人士觀看) Self explanatory. The Government requires all viewers of the film to be eighteen years of age or older. Minors are banned from renting, purchasing, or watching the film in a movie theatre (list of films).

Category III is the sole category of the four that is legally mandated and forbids a certain portion of the population from viewing the film. The remaining three are advisory ratings only. Ticket sellers and ushers in movie theatres are legally obligated to check the identity of a person who wishes to watch a Category III film, for proof of age, to ensure legal compliance.

== Surveys ==
Every two years, the Television and Entertainment Licensing Authority (TELA) commissioned an independent research company to conduct a large-scale survey to collect the public's views on the film classification system and the film classification standards. In 2000, a survey was conducted on 617 members of the public, aged 13 to 59 years old. In addition, supplementary surveys were conducted on 108 members on the panel of advisers and 472 moviegoers. The survey findings were that almost all respondents were aware the classification system was in place, and 59% could identify the current system, as well as its symbols and their meanings.

Findings of a survey conducted from 2010 to 2011 revealed that there was general community support of the existing film classification system and its standards.

== See also ==
- List of Hong Kong Category III films
