= List of Hong Kong films of 1991 =

This article lists feature-length Hong Kong films released in 1991.

== Box office ==
The highest-grossing Hong Kong films released in 1991, by domestic box office gross revenue, are as follows:

Highest-grossing films released in 1991
Rank	Title	Domestic gross
1	Fight Back to School	HK$43,892,449
2	Armour of God II: Operation Condor	HK$39,054,162
3	To Be Number One	HK$38,817,114
4	Once a Thief	HK$33,604,851
5	Tricky Brains	HK$31,388,471
6	God of Gamblers III: Back to Shanghai	HK$31,163,730
7	Lee Rock	HK$31,072,380
8	Once Upon a Time in China	HK$29,700,676
9	Her Fatal Ways II	HK$25,209,488
10	Dances with Dragon	HK$25,127,693

== Releases ==
Title	Director	Cast	Genre	Notes
1991
ABC Scandal	Chan Ji Wai			
Action in Border	Tommy Chung			
Alan and Eric: Between Hello and Goodbye	Peter Chan	Eric Tsang, Alan Tam	Drama	
Alien Wife	Teddy Chan	Tony Leung, Rosamund Kwan	Comedy	
All for the Gamblers	Sherman Wong			
All-Mighty Gambler	Wilson Tong			
American Shaolin	Lucas Lo			
Angel Force	Wah Sam			
Angel Hunter	Sun Chung			
Angel or Whore	Raymond Leung			
Angel Protectors	Godfrey Ho			
The Angels				
Angry Ranger	Johnny Wang			
Armour of God II: Operation Condor	Jackie Chan	Jackie Chan, Carol Cheng	Action	
Au Revoir, Mon Amour	Tony Au	Anita Mui, Tony Leung, Carrie Ng, Akai Hidekazu, Norman Chu, Kenneth Tsang, Aoyama Chikako, Kunimura Jun, William Tuen, Sheren Tang	Romance / War	
The Banquet	Alfred Cheung, Joe Cheung, Clifton Ko, Tsui Hark	Eric Tsang, Sammo Hung, Jacky Cheung, Richard Ng, Stephen Chow	Comedy	
Black Cat	Stephen Shin	Jade Leung, Simon Yam, Thomas Lam	Action	
Blue Lightning	Raymond Lee	Tony Leung, Danny Lee	Gun fu	
Bullet for Hire	Yuen Chun Man	Jacky Cheung, Simon Yam, Dick Wei, Sheila Chan, Elaine Lui, Lo Lieh, Elaine Chow	Gun fu	
Casino Raiders II	Johnnie To	Andy Lau, Dave Wong, Jacklyn Wu, Monica Chan	Drama	
A Chinese Ghost Story III	Ching Siu-Tung	Tony Leung Chiu-Wai, Joey Wong, Jacky Cheung		
A Chinese Legend	Lau Hung Chung	Jacky Cheung, Joey Wong, Sharla Cheung, Wu Ma, Lau Shun	Drama	
Crazy Safari	Billy Chan	N!xau, Lam Ching-ying	Comedy	
Crystal Hunt	Hsu Hsia	Donnie Yen, Carrie Ng, Ken Lo, Sibelle Hu, Takajo Fujimi	Action	
Dances with Dragon	Wong Jing	Andy Lau, Sharla Cheung, Deanie Ip, Alfred Cheung, Yvonne Yung, Ng Man-tat, Wu Ma, May Lo	Romantic comedy	
Daddy, Father, Papa	Clifton Ko	Sammo Hung, Raymond Wong, Teresa Mo, Liu Wai-hung	Comedy	
Deadly Deal	Kenneth Siao	Ray Lui, Simon Yam, Elizabeth Lee	Action	
Don't Fool Me	Herman Yau	Andy Lau, Tony Leung Chiu-Wai, Teresa Mo		
Fight Back to School	Gordon Chan	Stephen Chow, Sharla Cheung, Ng Man-tat, Roy Cheung	Comedy	
Fist of Fury 1991	Cho Chung Sing	Stephen Chow, Kenny Bee, Sharla Cheung, Corey Yuen, Wan Yeung-ming	Comedy	
The Gambling Ghost	Clifton Ko	Sammo Hung, Mang Hoi, Nina Li Chi, Wong Jim	Comedy	
Gigolo and Whore	Terry Tong	Simon Yam, Carina Lau, Alex Fong, Angile Leung	Adult	
God of Gamblers III: Back to Shanghai	Wong Jing	Stephen Chow, Gong Li, Ray Lui, Ng Man-tat, Charles Heung, Sandra Ng, Wong Wan Sze	Comedy	
The Good, the Bad and the Bandit	Lam Yi Jan	Ray Lui, Tien Niu, Simon Yam, Wong Yung	Gun fu	
Great Pretenders	Ronny Yu	Tony Leung, Simon Yam, Amy Yip, Raymond Wong, Teddy Robin	Comedy	
The Holy Virgin Versus the Evil Dead	Tony Lo	Donnie Yen, Pauline Yeung, Kathy Chow, Ben Lam, Chui Hei Man, Ken Lo, Sibelle Hu	Action / Horror / Adult	
Hong Kong Criminal Archives - Female Butcher	Kuk Kok Leung	Simon Yam, Yvonne Yung, Joey Meng, Jay Lau		
Hong Kong Godfather	Ho Cheuk Wing	Andy Lau, Yu Li, Joey Wong, Roy Cheung, Tommy Wong	Crime	
Inspector Pink Dragon	Gordon Chan	Lawrence Cheng, Rosamund Kwan, Waise Lee, Damian Lau, Nina Li Chi, Tony Leung		
Island of Fire	Kevin Chu	Jackie Chan, Sammo Hung, Andy Lau, Tony Leung Ka-fai	Action	
King of Chess	Tsui Hark, Yim Ho	Tony Leung, John Shum, Yim Ho, Yang Lin	Drama	
The Last Blood	Wong Jing	Alan Tam, Andy Lau, Eric Tsang, Bryan Leung, May Lo, Natalis Chan	Action	
Lee Rock	Lawrence Ah Mon	Andy Lau, Ng Man-tat, Sharla Cheung, Chingmy Yau, Kwan Hoi-san	Drama	
Lee Rock II	Lawrence Ah Mon	Andy Lau, Aaron Kwok, Sharla Cheung, Chingmy Yau, Ng Man-tat	Drama	
Lover's Tear	Jacob Cheung	Sammo Hung, Nina Li Chi, Lam Ching-ying, Collin Chou, Yukari Oshima, Wu Ma, Ku Feng, Elvis Tsui, Teddy Chan	Action / Romance	
Mission of Condor	Lee Chiu	Max Mok, Simon Yam, Moon Lee	Action	
My Flying Wife	O Sing Pui	Sammo Hung, Yu Li, Roy Cheung, Fennie Yuen, Tommy Wong	Ghost	
Off Track	Cha Chuen Yee	Jacky Cheung, Max Mok, Loletta Lee, Ellen Chan, Wu Ma, Karel Wong, Lung Fong	Drama	
Once Upon a Time in China	Tsui Hark	Jet Li, Yuen Biao, Jacky Cheung, Rosamund Kwan	Martial Arts / Action / Adventure	
Once a Thief	John Woo	Chow Yun-fat, Leslie Cheung, Cherie Chung	Action / Crime / Comedy	
The Perfect Match	Stephen Shin	George Lam, Maggie Cheung, Jacky Cheung, Vivian Chow, Lydia Shum, Benz Hui, Kingdom Yuen, Manfred Wong	Comedy	
Prison on Fire II	Ringo Lam	Chow Yun-fat, Chen Sung Young		
The Queen of Gamble	Siu Sang	Carol Cheng, Alex Man, Sibelle Hu, Simon Yam, Ng Man-tat, Aaron Kwok, Gigi Lai	Comedy	
Queen's High	Chris Lee	Cynthia Khan, Simon Yam, Wong Yung, Kenneth Tsang, Shum Wai, Cha Chuen Yee, Chris Lee	Gun fu	
The Raid	Ching Siu-tung, Tsui Hark	Dean Shek, Tony Leung, Jacky Cheung, Corey Yuen, Paul Chu, Fennie Yuen, Joyce Godenzi	Action	
The Real Me	Chow Wah Yu	Kwong Wa, Nishiwaki Michiko, Karel Wong, Kara Hui, Chin Siu-ho, Poon Sin Yee, Ken Lok, Hsu Hsia, Dennis Tang, Leung Tik Fai, Kellie Lam	Gun fu	
Red and Black	Andrew Kam	Tony Leung, Joey Wong, Lam Ching-ying, Wu Ma, Lisa Chiao Chiao, Lau Kong	Ghost	
Riki-Oh: The Story of Ricky	Lam Nai-choi	Fan Siu-wong, Fan Mei Sheng, Ka-Kui Ho	Martial Arts / Action / Comedy / Prison	
Running on Empty	Ho Cheuk Wing	Frankie Lam, Kwong Wa, Jacqueline Ng	Action	
Saviour of the Soul	Corey Yuen, David Lai	Andy Lau, Anita Mui, Aaron Kwok, Gloria Yip, Carina Lau, Kenny Bee, Corey Yuen, Danny Poon	Action / Fantasy / Romance	
Sea Wolves	Cheng Siu Keung	Cynthia Khan, Simon Yam, Norman Chu, Garry Chow	Action	
Slickers vs. Killers	Sammo Hung	Sammo Hung, Carol Cheng, Jacky Cheung, Richard Ng, Lam Ching-ying, Yu Li, Joyce Godenzi, Collin Chou	Action / Comedy / Thriller	
Son on the Run	Benny Chan	Max Mok, Ng Man-tat, May Lo, Cheng Pak Lam, Lau Siu Ming, Raymond Tsang	Romance	
The Tantana	Mang Hoi	Sammo Hung, Wu Ma, Lam Ching-ying, Chin Kar-lok, Mang Hoi, Ken Lo	Action / Martial arts	
This Thing Called Love	Lee Chi Ngai	Tony Leung, Cecilia Yip, Rosamund Kwan, Derek Yee	Drama	
The Tigers	Eric Tsang	Andy Lau, Tony Leung, Felix Wong, Michael Miu, Kent Tong, Bryan Leung, Irene Wan	Action / Crime	
To Catch a Thief	Andy Chin	Carol Cheng, Tony Leung, Ng Man-tat, Moon Lee	Comedy	
Touch and Go	Ringo Lam	Sammo Hung, Teresa Mo, Wan Yeung-ming, Tommy Wong, Irene Wan, Ann Mui, Lam Chung, Billy Chow, Lau Kong, Vincent Hon, Law Lan	Action	
Tricky Brains	Wong Jing	Andy Lau, Stephen Chow, Rosamund Kwan, Chingmy Yau, Ng Man Tat, Waise Lee, Wong Jing, Shing Fui-On	Comedy	
Will of Iron	David Chiang	Maggie Cheung, Jacky Cheung, Michael Wong, Crystal Kwok	Action	
Zodiac Killers	Ann Hui	Andy Lau, Cherie Chung	Drama	
