= Devoted to You =

Devoted to You may refer to:

- Devoted to You (film), a 1986 Hong Kong film
- "Devoted to You" (song), a 1958 popular song written by Felice and Boudleaux Bryant and popularized by the Everly Brothers

== See also ==
- "Hopelessly Devoted to You", a 1977 song recorded by Olivia Newton-John for the movie musical Grease
