= May Lo =

Hong Kong actress (born 1966)

- Born: 1 September 1966 (age 60); British Hong Kong
- Occupation: Actress
- Years active: 1983–1993
- Spouse: Jacky Cheung (m. 1996)
- Children: 2

Chinese name
- Traditional Chinese: 羅美薇
- Simplified Chinese: 罗美薇
Transcriptions
Standard Mandarin
- Hanyu Pinyin: Luó Měiwēi

May Lo Mei Wei (born 1 September 1966) is a Hong Kong former actress.

== Career ==
In 1985, Lo made her film debut in Mismatched Couples. After her debut, Lo with Fennie Yuen Kit Ying, Rachel Lee, Charine Chan Ka Ling, Ann Bridgewater and Bonnie Law became part of a girl group Happy Girl established by film producer Raymond Wong Pak-ming for actresses in his Happy Ghost franchise. Lo then acted in Happy Ghost 2, the second film of the franchise.

In 1986, Lo acted in Devoted to You, where she met her future husband, singer Jacky Cheung.

In 1991, Lo announced that she and Cheung had reconciled after breaking off in 1988. After that, Lo kept a low profile and eventually left the entertainment industry.

== Personal life ==
Lo is Hong Kong film producer and former owner of Golden Harvest Entertainment Leonard Ho's goddaughter. As Anita Mui was also Ho's goddaughter, Lo and Mui became sworn sisters.

In 1986, Lo met singer Jacky Cheung during the filming of Devoted to You, a movie that they both starred in. Cheung would fall in love with Lo during the filming and dated subsequently. In 1988, they separated but they reconciled in 1991. On 15 February 1996, they married in London, England. The couple have two daughters, born in 2000 and 2005.

== Filmography ==
Year	Title	Role	Notes	Ref.
1985	Mismatched Couples	Stella		
1985	Happy Ghost 2			
1985	The Isle Of Fantasy			
1986	Pom Pom Strikes Back	May		
1986	Passion			
1986	My Family			
1986	Devoted to You	May		
1987	You OK, I'm OK !			
1987	The Goofy Gang			
1988	Picture Of A Nymph			
1988	I'm Sorry			
1988	Heart To Hearts			
1989	Miracles		Cameo	
1989	The Inspector Wears Skirts 2			
1989	City Kids			
1990	Story of Kennedy Town	Wai-sum		
1990	Return Engagement	Little Lung		
1990	No Risk, No Gain	Jane Tsang		
1990	Midnight Angel	Rabbit		
1991	Son On The Run			
1991	The Last Blood	May / Ling		
1991	Happy Ghost 4	May Kan	Cameo	
1991	Dances with Dragon	Charmy		
1991	The Banquet	Dim sum girl	Cameo	
1992	The Unleaded Love			
1992	Operation Scorpio	Jade		
1992	Once A Black Sheep			
1992	Girls Without Tomorrow 2	Yuen Ling-Yuk		
1993	Two of a Kind			
1993	Lady Supercop	May		
