= Pink Bomb =

1993 Hong Kong film by Derek Chiu

- Film poster
- Traditional Chinese: 人生得意衰盡歡
- Simplified Chinese: 人生得意衰尽欢
- Hanyu Pinyin: Rén Shēng Dé Yì Shuāi Jìn Huān
- Jyutping: Jan4 Sang1 Dak1 Ji3 Seoi1 Zeon6 Fun1
- Directed by: Derek Chiu
- Screenplay by: Dayo Wong
- Produced by: Chow Wah-yu
- Starring: Waise Lee; Lau Ching-wan; Dayo Wong; Cheung Kwok-leung; Cynthia Khan; Gloria Yip; Loletta Lee; Fennie Yuen
- Cinematography: Ally Wong; Yuen Kwok-fai
- Edited by: Cheng Keung
- Music by: Wong Yiu-kwong
- Production company: Super Power Motion Picture
- Distributed by: Mandarin Films
- Release date: 27 March 1993
- Running time: 95 minutes
- Country: Hong Kong
- Language: Cantonese
- Box office: HK$51,329

Pink Bomb is a 1993 Hong Kong action comedy film directed by Derek Chiu and starring an ensemble cast of Waise Lee, Lau Ching-wan, Dayo Wong, Cheung Kwok-leung, Cynthia Khan, Gloria Yip, Loletta Lee and Fennie Yuen.

== Plot ==
Policewoman Leung Chi-kwan (Cynthia Khan), instructor Lee Sin-yee (Loletta Lee), beautician Yip Yuk-hing (Fennie Yuen), taxi driver Daniel (Lau Ching-wan) and former triad member Rascal King (Dayo Wong) goes to Thailand for vacation led by tour guide Graham (Waise Lee), a born again Christian. There, they rescue a prostitute Ann (Gloria Yip) who was beaten up by brothel frequenters for scamming their money. Ann stole a case of money which turns out to be US$3 million counterfeit currency. During the tour, they were constantly being chased by gangsters wanting to silence them. During this critical moment, Graham reveals his true identity as a secret agent.

== Cast ==
- Waise Lee as Graham
- Cynthia Khan as Leung Chi-kwan
- Loletta Lee as Lee Sin-yin
- Lau Ching-wan as Daniel
- Fennie Yuen as Yip Yuk-hing
- Dayo Wong as Rascal King
- Cheung Kwok-leung as Fake Cop
- Gloria Yip as Ann
- Fung Hak-on as Brother Black
- Helen Poon
- Baby Bo
- Ken Lok
- Lau Siu-kwan
- Ma On
- Garry Chan
- Jack Wong
- Ling Lai-man
- Sung Boon-chung
- Leung Kai Chi
- William Chu as Siu-ming
- Hui Sze-man as Siu-ming's mother
- San Tak0kan
- Ah Sing

== Reception ==
=== Critical ===
Love HK Film gave the a mixed review and describes it as "Amusing, but only occasionally. And probably not worth breaking your back to find." City On Fire also gave the film a mixed review and writes "Pink Bomb throws so much nonsense at you, you become mesmerized."

=== Box office ===
The film grossed HK$51,329 at the Hong Kong box office during its theatrical run from 27 to 31 March 1993 in Hong Kong.
