= Nina Li =

Nina Li may refer to:

- Nina Li Chi, Chinese actress currently married to Jet Li
- Li Nina, Chinese aerial skier
