= Dragon Fight =

1989 Hong Kong film by Billy Tang

- Film poster
- Traditional Chinese: 龍在天涯
- Simplified Chinese: 龙在天涯
- Hanyu Pinyin: Lóng zài tiān yá
- Jyutping: Lung4 zoi6 tin1 ngaai4
- Directed by: Billy Tang
- Written by: James Yuen
- Produced by: Henry Fong
- Starring: Jet Li; Nina Li Chi; Stephen Chow; Dick Wei
- Cinematography: Louis Yuen; Chu Chi-hung; Rumjamn Abdul Mohammed
- Edited by: Siu Lam
- Music by: Violet Lam
- Distributed by: Grand March Movie Production
- Release date: 1 September 1989
- Running time: 96 minutes
- Country: Hong Kong
- Languages: Cantonese; English
- Box office: HK$6,815,936

Dragon Fight is a 1989 Hong Kong action film directed by Billy Tang, with a screenplay written by James Yuen, and starring Jet Li, Nina Li Chi and Stephen Chow.

== Synopsis ==
Lee Kwok-Lap and Wong Wai were childhood buddies who grew up training together in the state-sponsored martial arts troupe. Wai felt there was no future in the troupe and plotted to remain illegally in San Francisco when the troupe was on a performance tour. Lap found out at the airport just before their return flight and tried to stop Wai. Lap not only failed to dissuade Wai, he also became the unwitting scapegoat after Wai unintentionally killed an airport police. Both went separate paths.

Lap was sheltered by Yao who admired Lap's skills. Lap began working in Yao's uncle's grocery store while evading police manhunt. Wai took up with the mob lieutenant, Marco, and began to impress the bosses with his ruthless efficiency at getting rid of rival gangs.

When the Big Boss decided to give Wai the chance to conduct a major drug deal, the jealous Marco tipped off the police to discredit Wai. Wai escaped the police but lost the drugs. Yao accidentally found the drugs and decided it was his ticket to get rich. However, his attempt to sell the drugs led the mob back to his uncle's grocery store. The Big Boss ordered Wai to prove his worth to the mob by cleaning up the mess and finishing off Lap.

== Cast ==
- Jet Li as Lee Kwok-Lap
- Nina Li Chi as Kuen
- Stephen Chow as Yao
- Dick Wei as Wong Wai
- Henry Fong as Marco
- Robert Urich as Airport Police
- Scott Coker as Big Boss's Bodyguard
- Kenny Pérez as Big Boss's Gangster
- Mike Kim as Vietnamese Killer
- Darren Pang as Vietnamese Killer
- Barry Wong as Drug Dealer
- Lynn McRee as Air Hostess
- Steven Ho as Big Boss's Gangster
- Ernie Reyes Sr. as Big Boss's Killer
- George Chung as Big Boss's Killer
