= Scott Coker =

American sports executive

- Born: October 3, 1962 (age 64); Seoul, South Korea
- Occupations: Fight Night at the Tech, founder
- Known for: Strikeforce, founder and CEO; Bellator MMA, president

Scott Coker (born October 3, 1962) is an American mixed martial artist, Taekwondoin, former movie stuntman, and combat sports promoter. He is the founder and former CEO of MMA promotion Strikeforce, former president of Bellator MMA, and founder of Fight Night at the Tech.

== Background ==
Scott Coker was born in Seoul in 1962. His father, an American from Tennessee, had arrived in Korea shortly after the Korean War. He met Scott's mother, a Korean, while she was singing at a USO club. They married in December 1959. When he was approximately 9 years old, Scott and his family relocated to the United States, where they settled in San Jose, California in 1973.

Coker is an Ernie Reyes protégé and full-contact fight promoter covering Kickboxing, K-1, and MMA. Coker has obtained an 8th degree black belt in Taekwondo under Reyes and was an original member of the West Coast Demonstration Team. In 1986, Scott Coker became one of the first directors of ISKA.

== Mixed martial arts ==
=== Strikeforce ===
Coker founded Strikeforce in 1985 as a kickboxing organization.

The promotion held its first MMA event, Strikeforce: Shamrock vs. Gracie, on March 10, 2006, at the HP Pavilion in San Jose, California. Over the next five years, Coker built the brand into the number two mixed martial arts promotion in the United States, partnering with both Showtime and CBS to televise their events. Strikeforce co-promoted some events with Elite Xtreme Combat, or EliteXC.

In March 2011, Strikeforce was purchased by Zuffa, LLC. Coker was retained by the company for a contractual period of three years, ending in April 2014.

=== Bellator MMA ===
On June 18, 2014, Coker was named president of Bellator MMA following the departure of founder and CEO Bjorn Rebney. Coker said he planned to move the promotion away from its tournament-based format, while retaining tournaments when appropriate.

In November 2023, the Professional Fighters League (PFL) acquired Bellator from Paramount. Coker declined an opportunity to join PFL, saying he wanted to return to working as an entrepreneur.

=== Fight Night at the Tech ===
In March 2024, four months after Bellator MMA was sold to PFL, Coker announced that he and Gilbert Melendez will debut a new MMA event called Fight Night at the Tech, on May 18, 2024.

=== Ki MMA ===
In September 2026, Coker announced Ki MMA, a mixed martial arts promotion scheduled to hold its first events in early 2027. The promotion's plans included a 32-fighter featherweight tournament spanning North America, South America, Europe and Asia, with bouts held in a ring rather than a cage. In an October interview with BBC Sport, Coker said he intended to supplement the tournament with bouts featuring established fighters.

== Awards ==
- Combat Press
  - 2015 Executive of the Year

== Film career ==
Coker has participated in various martial arts movies as a fighter, including Dragon Fight, The Last Dragon, and Surf Ninjas.
