= Kid with the Golden Arm =

1979 Hong Kong film by Chang Cheh

- DVD release cover
- Directed by: Chang Cheh
- Screenplay by: I Kuang; Chang Cheh
- Produced by: Mona Fong
- Starring: Kuo Chui; Chiang Sheng; Lu Feng; Lo Mang; Helen Poon; Sun Chien; Shu Pei Sun; Wei Pai; Wang Lung Wei; Dick Wei; Yang Hsiung
- Cinematography: Tsao Hui-Chi
- Edited by: Chang Hsing-Lung; Li Yen-Hai
- Music by: Eddie H. Wang
- Distributed by: Shaw Brothers Studio
- Release date: 2 November 1979 (Hong Kong)
- Running time: 86 minutes
- Country: Hong Kong
- Language: Mandarin

Kid with the Golden Arm (original title: 金臂童, pinyin: Jīn bì tóng) is a 1979 Shaw Brothers kung fu film directed by Chang Cheh and produced by Mona Fong. It is one of the few Venom Mob films to include Wei Pai (Snake Venom).

== Plot ==
The government asks Yang Hu Yun (Sun Chien) to escort a cargo of gold to a famine stricken area. The vicious Chi Sha gang announces their intention to hijack it by killing one of Yang's employees. Yang describes to his men Chi Sha's four chiefs, each of whom has mastered a style of fighting: Golden Arm (Lo Mang), Silver Spear (Lu Feng), Iron Robe (Wang Lung Wei), and Brass Head (Yang Hsiung). To protect the gold, Yang hires swordsman Li Chin Ming (Wei Pai), Ming's girlfriend Miss Leng Feng (Helen Poon), Long Axe Yang Jiu (Shu Pei Sun), Short Axe Fang Shih (Chiang Sheng), and drunken master Agent Hai Tao (Kuo Chui).

On their way to meet with Yang, Long and Short Axe encounter the Seven Hooks gang and proceed to fight and kill three gang members each. Being competitive fighter neither wants to kill more than the other so they kill the last gang member together.

Before meeting with Yang, Leng encounters Iron Robe; Hai Tao appears and defeats her attackers, though he disappears once again before she can thank him. When Leng meets with Ming at a winery, the employees, which are Silver Spear, Brass Head, and several Chi Sha gang members in disguise, attack them. Ming is poisoned by Sand Palm (Dick Wei) before they flee. Despite the commotion, Hai Tao enters and demands service. After defeating several gang members, he identifies the disguised owner and manager as Silver Spear and Brass Head. After they pull off their disguises, they invite Hai Tao to join their gang. When he refuses, they allow him to leave peacefully, still hoping to recruit him.

Ming continues on his own after arguing with Leng over whether he should see a doctor; he is interested only in completing the mission. Meanwhile, Yang and his men battle Brass Head, who bursts from a secret tunnel in the floor. After mortally wounding him, they are in turn defeated by Golden Arm, whose unarmed style makes him invulnerable to their attacks. Golden Arm promises Brass Head vengeance before leaving to catch up with his gang members that have stolen the gold. Hai Tao stops the wagon by popping off a wheel, kills Iron Robe, and hides. Impressed with Hai Tao's skill, Golden Arm becomes determined to fight him. Golden Arm leaves the wagon for Yang to fix, confident he can retake it later.

Silver Spear easily defeats a weakened Ming, but Hai Tao rescues him. As Silver Spear retreats, Hai Tao takes Ming to a crematory. As Leng protests, the heat revives and cures Ming, though he is ungrateful and annoyed to owe his life to Hai Tao. As Yang and his men retrieve and fix the wagon, several men are poisoned from traps and die. All converge in a town, where they agree to rest for the night. After several more people die from poison traps, and Hai Tao saves the survivors from another trap, they realize the entire town is trapped. Ming becomes angry when Hai Tao and Leng become flirtatious.

Two of Yang's men die as they attempt to steal the gold, making Hai Tao suspicious, as he reasons the Chi Sha gang could not foresee this. In the morning, he leaves for another town, where he confronts Silver Spear, who is confused when Hai Tao questions him about poisoning the gold. Silver Spear leaves him with an ultimatum: join the gang or duel Golden Arm. Hai Tao chooses to duel. On the road, Yang's remaining escort become afraid and ask to leave, which he grants. Short Axe and Long Axe scout ahead, where they encounter several Chi Sha gang members and Silver Spear. Silver Spear kills Long Axe from a distance with silver darts, which angers Short Axe spurring him to kill most of the gang members. While Silver Spear is fighting Short Axe, a gang member sneaks up behind Short Axe and impales him on a spear. In turn, Short Axe uses his weapons to kill the attacker. As Silver Spear is about to inflict an impaling blow to Short Axe, Short Axe impales Silver Spear before he dies. Before either can inflict another blow to the other, they each drop dead.

Upon finding the tombs of Long Axe and Short Axe, Ming storms off impatiently to challenge Golden Arm, who defeats and kills him. Hai Tao duels with Golden Arm. Reasoning that his eyes are unprotected, Hai Tao blinds him by spitting wine. Yang demands they kill Golden Arm, but when Hai Tao refuses, a man bursts from the gold cart, slashes Hai Tao, and reveals himself as Iron Feet (Sun Chien). Iron Feet explains that he partnered with Yang to counteract Golden Arm's Chi Sha Gang and claim the gold for themselves; however, he kills Yang. As the now-blinded Golden Arm and Iron Feet duel, Hai Tao reveals that he was only pretending to be wounded; Iron Feet only slashed his wine canteen. Together, Golden Arms and Hai Tao kill Iron Feet. Golden Arm intends to retire but is mortally wounded by Leng Feng. Instead of killing her, he accepts death as a better alternative, and Hai Tao leaves Leng to escort the gold as he gets drunk.

== Cast ==
- Sun Chien – Yang Hu Yun/Iron Feet
- Lo Mang – Golden Arms, the undisputed leader and founder of the Chi Sha Gang and its youngest member. He is cold and ruthless, yet has a strong sense of honor and loyalty. Both of his arms are hard as gold and invulnerable.
- Kuo Chui – Hai Tao, a government agent who fights best when drunk
- Lu Feng – Silver Spear, the second in command of the Chi Sha Gang. His abilities with a spear are unmatched, and his spear has the special ability to extend itself when needed. He also carries throwing darts.
- Chiang Sheng – Short Axe Yang Jiu
- Shu Pei Sun – Long Axe Fang Shih
- Wei Pai – Li Chin Ming, a swordsman
- Helen Poon – Miss Leng Feng
- Wang Lung Wei – Iron Robe, the third in command of the Chi Sha Gang. His robe makes him partially invulnerable to most weaponry, and he carries a bladed fan as a weapon.
- Yang Hsiung – Brass Head, the fourth in command of the Chi Sha Gang. His style incorporates fatal headbutts from his brass helmet.
- Dick Wei - Sand Palm Fighter, a member of the Chi Sha gang whose palm strike can kill a man within hours if not treated.

== Reception ==
Paste included Kid with the Golden Arm at #20 in their list of the 100 best martial arts films. In their review, they wrote, "Honestly, Kid With the Golden Arm isn't particularly complex or even all that original, but it's pure, unadulterated old-school kung fu fun." Stan Hall of The Oregonian called it a "surreal, action-packed period piece" with impressive fights, highlighting Silver Spear's final battle.

== Legacy ==
Rapper U-God took his name (Golden Arms) from this film.

The title of the movie is mentioned in Wu-Tang Clan's song "Gravel Pit".
