= Linda Kuk =

Hong Kong film producer (1954–2026)

- 谷薇麗
- Born: 1954; British Hong Kong
- Died: 2 May 2026 (aged 71–72); Hong Kong
- Occupation: Film producer

Chinese name
- Traditional Chinese: 谷薇麗
Transcriptions
Yue: Cantonese
- Jyutping: Guk1 mei4 lai6

Linda Kuk Mei-lai (Chinese: 谷薇麗, 1954 – 2 May 2026) was a Hong Kong film producer.

== Life and career ==
Kuk began her film career as a production manager and a film coordinator. In 1986, Kuk became a film producer. The first film Kuk produced was the comedy movie My Family (1986) directed by Raymond Fung.

Kuk died on 2 May 2026.

== Filmography ==
=== Films ===
- 1986 My Family – Producer
- 1986 Devoted to You – Producer
- 1986 Legacy of Rage – Producer
- 1987 An Autumn's Tale – Executive producer
- 1987 Brotherhood – Producer
- 1987 Magnificent Warriors – Producer
- 1987 It's a Mad, Mad, Mad World – Producer
- 1987 Porky's Meatballs – Producer
- 1987 You OK, I'm OK! – Producer
- 1988 It's a Mad, Mad, Mad World II – Producer
- 1988 Bless This House – Producer
- 1988 Carry On Hotel – Producer
- 1991 Once a Thief – Producer
- 1992 Hard Boiled – Producer
- 1992 Now You See Love, Now You Don't – Producer
- 1994 Treasure Hunt – Producer
- 1996 Somebody Up There Likes Me – Executive producer

== See also ==
- Terence Chang
- John Shum
