= Michelle Sima =

Hong Kong actress (1963–2015)

- 司馬燕
- Born: Hon Siu-ling (韓少玲); 15 March 1963; Hong Kong
- Died: 10 January 2015 (aged 51); Hong Kong
- Other names: Michelle Sima Yan, Michelle Sze Ma-Yin, Shut-Ma Yin, Si-Ma Yin, Sima Yan
- Occupation: Actress
- Years active: 1980–1996
- Spouse: Togi Gouw (m. 1996)
- Children: 2

Michelle Sima (Chinese: 司馬燕; 15 March 1963 – 10 January 2015) was a Hong Kong actress. Sima is credited with over 25 films.

== Career ==
In 1980, Sima became a beauty pageant contestant in Miss Hong Kong, but she was not placed. In 1983, Sima became an actress in Hong Kong films. Sima first appeared as Pak Wing-Sin (or Dior Bai Yongxian) in The Sensational Pair, a 1983 Drama film directed by Albert Lai Gin-Kwok. Sima was active in the 1980s and early 1990s as a supporting actress or sex symbol role in Cantonese romantic comedy, drama, and horror films. Sima's last film was The Mad Monk, a 1993 Fantasy film directed by Johnnie To Kei-Fung. Sima is credited with over 25 films. In 1996, Sima retired from the film industry.

== Personal life ==
Sima was born in Hong Kong on 15 March 1963. In 1996, she married Togi Gouw (Chinese: 吳忠義), a Dutch businessman of Chinese Indonesian descent. They had two sons, Ian Gouw and Brian Gouw. The former became an actor.

In 2012, Sima was diagnosed with stomach cancer. She died on 10 January 2015 at the age of 51.

== Filmography ==
=== Films ===
This is a partial list of films.

- 1983 - The Sensational Pair - Pak Wing-Sin (or Dior Bai Yongxian)
- 1989 - Doubles Causes Troubles - Inspector Xu
- 1990 - Demoness from Thousand Years (aka Chase From Beyond) - Policeman
- 1993 - The Mad Monk - Pregnant wife
