= Mismatched Couples =

1985 Hong Kong film by Yuen Woo-ping

- Film poster
- Traditional Chinese: 情逢敵手
- Simplified Chinese: 情逢敌手
- Hanyu Pinyin: Qíng Féng Dí Shǒu
- Jyutping: Cing4 Fung4 Dik6 Sau2
- Directed by: Yuen Woo-ping
- Screenplay by: Peace Group; Cheng Man Wa; Chui Ching-hong
- Story by: Peace Group
- Produced by: Brandy Yuen
- Starring: Donnie Yen; Yuen Woo-ping; Wong Wan-si; May Lo; Anna Kamiyama; Kenny Pérez
- Cinematography: Yu Chik-lim
- Edited by: Mui Tung-lit; Norman Wong; Yip Wai-keung
- Music by: Norman Wong; Chyna; Donald Ashley
- Production companies: Cinema City & Films Co. Peace Film Production (HK) Co.
- Distributed by: Cinema City & Films Co.
- Release date: 3 April 1985
- Running time: 95 minutes
- Country: Hong Kong
- Language: Cantonese
- Box office: HK$6,617,877

Mismatched Couples (a.k.a. Love Meets the Match) is a 1985 Hong Kong action romantic comedy film directed by Yuen Woo-ping and starring himself alongside Donnie Yen.

The film was created during hip hop culture's height of popularity in the 1980s, and in addition to martial arts, incorporates b-boying, popping, locking, and the electric boogaloo.

== Plot ==
Eddie (Donnie Yen) is a martial artist and hip hop dancer. In the film, he befriends a poor old man named Mini (Yuen Woo-ping). Mini later falls in love with Eddie's older sister, Ying (Wong Wan-si). Later, Eddie's cousin, Stella (May Lo), falls for him, but Eddie actually has his eyes on Anna (Anna Kamiyama). Meanwhile, Kenny (Kenny Perez) also has his eyes on Anna, while there is a fighting champion (Dick Wei) who is obsessed with fighting Eddie.

== Cast ==
Cast	Role
Donnie Yen	Eddie
Yuen Woo-ping	Mini
Wong Wan-si	Ying
May Lo	Stella
Anna Kamiyama	Anna
Dick Wei	Fight champion
Brandy Yuen	Drunkard at Kenny's party
Mandy Chan	Colourful Punk
To Wai-wo	Molester
Yip Ha-lei	Old man at airport
Kenny Perez	Kenny
Lee Yue	Buyer of sugar cane
Jackson Ng	Molester
Ken Boyle	Tourist
Shirley Tan	Lynn
Chui Ching-hong	Customer teasing Stella
Sam Wong	neighbour
