= Crazy Love (1993 film) =

1993 Hong Kong film by Roman Cheung

- Film poster
- 蜜桃成熟時
- Directed by: Roman Cheung
- Written by: Roman Cheung; Vincent Kok
- Based on: The Fruit is Ripe (West Germany) (1977)
- Produced by: Clifton Ko
- Starring: Loletta Lee; Poon Jan-Wai; Shing Fui-On; Tommy Wong; Joh Chung-Sing; Lisa Chiao Chiao
- Cinematography: Lee Kin-Keung
- Edited by: Pang Chin-Kuen
- Music by: Wong Sai Cheong
- Production company: Ko Chi Sum Films Co. Ltd.
- Distributed by: Mandarin Films; Pegasus Motion Pictures
- Release date: 17 April 1993 (Hong Kong)
- Running time: 77 minutes
- Country: Hong Kong
- Language: Cantonese
- Box office: HK $12,317,471

Crazy Love (Chinese: 蜜桃成熟時) is a 1993 Hong Kong romantic comedy film directed by Roman Cheung. It's based on 1977 German softcore erotic comedy film, The Fruit is Ripe.

== Plot ==
A young, rich, free-thinking girl named Jane (Loletta Lee) visits Hong Kong instead of the study trip to the United Kingdom she tricked her parents into approving, after she caught her boyfriend, John cheating on her. After several incidents she meets Kwan, who is staying in the same hotel as her. She is motivated to find a true, happy love—and Kwan does not fill that role. One morning during a walk on the beach, Jane meets David (Poon Jan-Wai), a struggling young scriptwriter. Jane eventually falls in love with him without realizing it.

== Cast ==
- Loletta Lee as Jane
- Poon Jan-Wai as David
- Shing Fui-On
- Tommy Wong
- Joh Chung-Sing
- Lisa Chiao Chiao as Jane's mother
