= Ki MMA =

American mixed martial arts promotion

- Industry: Mixed martial arts
- Founded: 14 September 2026
- Founder: Scott Coker; Peter Levin

Ki MMA is a mixed martial arts promotion announced by Scott Coker in September 2026. Its first events are planned for early 2027. The promotion has announced a 32-fighter featherweight tournament involving competitors from North America, South America, Asia and Europe.

== History ==
Coker, the former head of Strikeforce and Bellator MMA, announced Ki MMA at a news conference in New York on September 14, 2026. Peter Levin was announced as chairman, while matchmaker Rich Chou was appointed to lead athlete relations. ESPN and BBC Sport reported that the venture had secured $60 million in funding.

== Planned competition format ==
The inaugural tournament is planned for the featherweight division at 145 pounds (66 kg), with eight fighters from each of the four regions. Regional competitions are intended to determine four representatives who advance to an international semifinal stage. Bouts are to take place in a ring rather than a cage. The promotion also plans to hold bouts involving established fighters outside the tournament.
