= Osaka Wrestling Restaurant =

2004 Hong Kong film by Tommy Law

- Film poster
- Directed by: Tommy Law
- Written by: Ko Cheng-teng; Takashi Hasegawa
- Produced by: Satoshi Kono; Sam Leong; Haruhiko Yoshida
- Starring: Timmy Hung; Wayne Lai; Miku Ueno; Law Kar-ying; Gloria Yip; Sammo Hung
- Cinematography: Adam Chan Chung-tai
- Distributed by: Same way production
- Release date: 9 July 2004
- Running time: 92 mins
- Country: Hong Kong
- Languages: Cantonese; Japanese

Osaka Wrestling Restaurant (traditional Chinese: 大阪達一餐; simplified Chinese: 香港厨神) is a 2004 Hong Kong comedy film directed by Tommy Law. The film stars Timmy Hung, Sammo Hung and Mang Hoi. This was Mang Hoi's last film appearance until 2014's Kung Fu Jungle. The film features a storyline taking place in both Hong Kong and Japan.

== Story ==
The movie begins with Ricky (Timmy Hung) as an incompetent chef at a restaurant owned by the harsh manager One-Eye Dragon (Law Ka-ying). Ricky is often yelled at and beaten by the other chefs and the manager. One day, Ricky's father dies and leaves him a large inheritance of money. Before his death, Ricky's father tells him to reconcile and work with his estranged older brother. That night, Ricky receives a phone call from his older brother Mike (Wayne Lai), who knows about the inheritance money and wants to use it for his idea. Ricky rejects his older brother, berating him for leaving the family and not helping with their hardships.

Back at work, Ricky expresses his goal of making a famous dish and is again mocked by his manager, causing Ricky to snap, quit his job, and hit One-Eye Dragon with a cucumber. Angered, One-Eye Dragon and the other chefs prepare to attack him with kitchen utensils but Ricky flees, causing them to chase after him. As he runs, Ricky accidentally bumps into Kyoko (Miku Ueno), a Japanese actress, and causes her to fall into a river. Kyoko was already having trouble with her job because she was becoming uncomfortable eating too much food to advertise a restaurant. Falling into the river while on break causes her to lose her job and becomes stranded in Hong Kong.

Ricky travels to Osaka, Japan to find his equally incompetent brother Mike, who is trying to escape from his own apartment because someone who he owes money is banging at his door. It turns out Mike has a vision for a Chinese restaurant combined with live Osaka Pro Wrestling in Hong Kong. They try to recruit the star wrestler Super Delfin but he rejects them. They return to Hong Kong and open a restaurant right across the street from Ricky's old restaurant. They hold a recruiting session for performers, which attracts all kinds of weird people including a fire-breathing Bruce Lee look-alike, a drunken kung fu master, a Classical Chinese dynasty warrior, a sumo wrestler, and a transgender football player. The last three are accepted and they are all given masked wrestling personas, with Mike being "Tiger Mask" and Ricky being "Super Delfin".

Meanwhile, Kyoko remains stranded in Hong Kong and experiences comical mishaps. She sees a poster advertising the Osaka Wrestling restaurant and seeks a job there. Kyoko mistakes the masked Ricky for the real Super Delfin and becomes enamored with him, as she is a big fan.

The restaurant gains a reputation and attracts the attention of elderly food critic Chau (Sammo Hung), who makes a reservation one week ahead. As the Osaka Wrestling restaurant succeeds, One-Eye Dragon's restaurant fails, and he starts to sabotage them. First, he contaminates their food with fried rats and fake teeth, causing all the customers to leave and the restaurant to fail. Kyoko is also recruited into another acting job. Though she is at first reluctant to leave the restaurant, she accidentally sees Ricky without his mask on and realizes he is not Super Delfin, but the man who pushed her into the river. Kyoko leaves the restaurant.

Meanwhile, Mike meets with his son and divorced wife Maye (Gloria Yip). He tries to reconcile with her, but she believes that it is too late to do so, and tells Mike she plans to move to Canada with a new husband, taking their son with them. Mike falls into despair and stops working.

A week later, food critic Chau returns to the restaurant for his reservation and asks to be served their best dish. Ricky tries to get Mike to cook, telling him that if they can impress food critic Chau, they will become famous worldwide. Ricky manages to convince his older brother by telling him that Mike's son visited the restaurant and wants to tell his father that he enjoys watching about his restaurant on TV and wants to keep doing so. Ricky gives his older brother a drawing of "Tiger Mask" made by his son. Encouraged, Mike returns to work and plans to serve Chau a secret, ancient recipe for xiao long bao found along their father's inheritance money. The crew prematurely celebrates and knocks over a bottle of sauce which spills over the recipe. While attempting to follow it, they reluctantly add hot peppers into the recipe. Upon eating the xiao long bao, the elderly Chau becomes extremely revitalized, running around frantically. One-Eye Dragon also sneaks into the restaurant's kitchen and samples the xiao long bao, causing him to be revitalized as well. The restaurant is brought back to fame and all the employees are too busy making more xiao long bao to put on a wrestling show, having revitalized elderly customers fight in their place.

Kyoko finds that in her new acting job, she has to do the same thing as her old acting job: eating too much food, which she dislikes. She returns to the Osaka Wrestling restaurant and is rehired by Mike. Maye is about to leave to the airport with her son, but he tells her that he wants to stay and be with his real father, causing Maye to reconsider moving to Canada.

One-Eye Dragon plans to sabotage Ricky's restaurant once more, this time by placing a bomb in their kitchen. After doing so, he accidentally knocks a pot onto his own head and falls unconscious. When he reawakens, the bomb explodes. Some time later, the crew of the Osaka Wrestling restaurant is seen in Japan, where they have a successful food stall and even serve the real Super Delfin.

== Cast ==
- Timmy Hung - Ricky
- Wayne Lai - Mike
- Miku Ueno - Kyoko
- Law Kar-ying - One-eye dragon
- Gloria Yip - Maye
- Chin Kar-lok - TV Director
- Mang Hoi - Cop
- Tats Lau -
- Carlo Ng Ka-lok -
- Sammo Hung - Food expert Chow Yan-kei
- Sam Lee Chan-sam
- Martin Zetterlund

== Review ==
Some reviewers have claimed the film a cult classic despite flying under the radar of most film critics. Review scores have ranged from 6.9 out of 10 to as much as 9 out of 10. Most reviews acknowledge the plot as being different and a pleasant surprise.

== See also ==
- Eat Drink Man Woman
- The God of Cookery
- Kung Fu Chefs
- Like Water for Chocolate
- Sammo Hung filmography
- The Chinese Feast
- The Wedding Banquet
