= Close Escape =

1989 Hong Kong film by Chow Chun-wing

- Film poster
- Traditional Chinese: 飛越危牆
- Simplified Chinese: 飞越危墙
- Hanyu Pinyin: Fēi Yuè Wēi Qiáng
- Jyutping: Fei1 Jyut6 Ngai4 Ceong4
- Directed by: Chow Chun-wing
- Screenplay by: Bryan Cheung; Chow Chun-wing
- Produced by: Guy Lai
- Starring: Aaron Kwok; Max Mok; Michael Miu; Dick Wei; Charine Chan; Yukari Oshima
- Cinematography: Hung Hin-sing
- Edited by: Robert Choi
- Music by: John Wong
- Production company: Y.C. Lai Films
- Distributed by: Y.C. Lai Films channel RED by HBO
- Release date: 18 May 1989
- Running time: 93 minutes
- Country: Hong Kong
- Language: Cantonese
- Box office: HK$2,149,821

Close Escape (Chinese: 飛越危牆) is a 1989 Hong Kong action film directed by Chow Chun-wing, starring Aaron Kwok, Max Mok, and Michael Miu in his theatrical debut.

== Plot ==
Lam Wai-tung (Michael Miu), dying from cancer, steals some diamonds from smuggler Chiu Ying-kau (Dick Wei) in order to raise money for his younger brother Wai-leung (Max Mok) to study medicine overseas. Wai-leung meanwhile, is oblivious to his brother's illicit dealings. After the robbery, Chiu is questioned at the police station by Kwat (Chan Chik-Wai) and Sergeant Ben Kwok (Aaron Kwok), who suspect he might be related to the case due to his dubious past in the stock market, but lack the evidence to convict him. Wai-leung, Ben, and Ben's sister Man (Charine Chan) throw a surprise birthday party for Wai-tung. Wai-tung leaves early to negotiate a ransom with Chiu for the stolen diamonds, but has secretly exchanged them with counterfeit ones. The deal quickly falls through when Chiu subtly threatens Wai-tung by mentioning Wai-leung. Just as Wai-tung arrives outside his house to warn his brother, he is ambushed by Chiu's henchmen who violently stab him to death and retrieve the (unbeknownst to them) counterfeit diamonds. Though unable to stop the murderers, Ben catches a glimpse of one of the fleeing henchmen's faces. Later at the police station, he learns of his name and identity as Big Head (Cheung Miu-hau). Kwat reveals that he works directly under Chiu, giving the police reason to begin investigating the latter. Ben reveals his suspicions to Wai-leung that his brother may have had illicit dealings with Chiu, but Wai-leung angrily refuses to believe him. Ben once more questions Chiu in an attempt to get him to reveal his relationship with Big Head and Wai-tung, but is unable to gain any useful information.

Wai-leung later receives a phone call from Chiu, who has discovered that the diamonds are fake and threatens his life unless he can procure the real ones. Wai-leung agrees in an attempt to lure and trap the smugglers in his apartment while he calls the police from outside. However, Man then arrives looking for Wai-leung, forcing him to run inside to warn her, resulting in him being captured by Chiu. Wai-leung is tortured by the smugglers and ultimately passes out after he is shot in the leg. Big Head is then shot to death by another of Chiu's henchmen, Yok (Pomson Shi), who has learned that the police are after him and so kills him to hamper their investigations. Big Head's corpse and Yok's gun are placed with the unconscious Wai-leung, who is then framed for murder and goes on the run. Whilst fleeing, he falls onto the road and is struck by a passing vehicle driven by Miko (Yukari Oshima), a Hong Kong-based reporter from Japan. He threatens her at gunpoint and forces her to take him to Wai-tung's old home to hide out and recuperate. He later finds his brother's diary and finally learns the truth including his cancer diagnosis and the reason for his liaison with Chiu. Ben and Kwat meanwhile, arrive at the murder scene although neither believe in the eyewitness' testament that point to Wai-leung as being Big Head's killer, and are convinced the true culprit is Chiu Ying-kau. Ben begins tailing Chiu, bugging his car and hiding in the trunk in hopes of being able to record concrete evidence of his smuggling activities. He witnesses Chiu, Yok, and Miko talking and learns she is in fact, an informant he had hired to monitor Wai-leung and get close to him so that he may reveal the diamonds' location. When Miko returns to Wai-tung's house, she finds Wai-leung gone and a voice recording he left behind detailing his intentions to kill Chiu and avenge his brother.

When Ben, Kwat, and Man continue to monitor Chiu, Wai-leung disrupts their plan by openly shooting at him. It is only with Ben restraining Wai-leung that they avoid any further escalations. Back at Wai-tung's house, Ben, Wai-leung, and Man reunite albeit frustrated they still do not have any evidence to arrest Chiu. Things worsen when Miko arrives, whereupon she is immediately recognized by Ben who accuses her of being an informant for Chiu. Wai-leung defends her and a fight breaks out between the three of them. During the scuffle, Ben and Wai-leung knock over a table and the diamonds that Wai-tung had hidden fall out from one of the table legs. Seeing this, Miko knocks Ben to the ground, taking his gun and handcuffing him and Wai-leung to a metal beam while she retrieves the diamonds, confirming her true allegiance. En route to her next destination however, she has a change of heart, having seemingly developed feelings for Wai-leung. She finds Man and hands her Ben's gun, and returns to the house upon seeing Chiu and his men headed its way. Man throws Ben's gun from the chimney and Wai-leung uses it to shoot himself and Ben free. Miko returns and holds Chiu at gunpoint. She returns the diamonds to him in exchange for Wai-leung and Ben but is ambushed by Yok who knocks her gun to the ground. With Chiu now fully determined to kill them, Wai-leung, Ben, and Miko desperately fight for their lives, succeeding in killing all the henchmen although all three sustain serious injuries. Wai-leung, having been stabbed in his fight with Yok, uses the same knife to stab Chiu multiple times and nearly kills him, overcome by rage. Ben however stops him but as they turn to leave, Chiu attempts blindsiding them. An infuriated Wai-leung subsequently shoots him to death.

== Cast ==
- Aaron Kwok as Sergeant Ben Kwok
- Max Mok as Lam Wai-leung
- Michael Miu as Lam Wai-tung
- Dick Wei as Chiu Ying-kau
- Charine Chan as Man
- Yukari Oshima as Miko
- William So as Wai-leung's friend
- Chan Chik-wai as Uncle Kwat
- Cheung Miu-hau as Big Head
- Pomson Shi as Yok
- Au-yeung Tak Fan
- Lam Chi-tai as Poky
- Chiang Tao as Shek Sun
- Chung Wai as thug
- Chang Seng-kwong as thug
- Cho Chung-sing
- Yiu Man-kei as thug
- Lam Foo-wai as thug

== Box office ==
The film grossed HK$2,149,821 at the Hong Kong box office during its theatrical run from 18 May to 1 June 1989 in Hong Kong.

== See also ==
- Aaron Kwok filmography
