= Demoness from Thousand Years =

1990 Hong Kong film by Jeng Wing-Chiu

- English VHS cover from Poland
- Traditional Chinese: 千年女妖
- Simplified Chinese: 千年女妖
- Directed by: Jeng Wing-Chiu
- Screenplay by: Benny Tam
- Produced by: Jeng Ting-Dung; Lau Chi-Woh
- Starring: Joey Wong; Jacky Cheung; Meg Lam; Andy Hui; Tai Chi Squadron; Tiffany Lau; Si-Ma Yin; Hsiao Ho
- Cinematography: Gray Hoh; Lam Wah-Chiu
- Edited by: Grand Yip
- Music by: Tats Lau
- Production company: Chan's Films Company
- Distributed by: D & B Film Distribution
- Release date: 7 September 1990
- Running time: 92 minutes
- Country: Hong Kong
- Language: Cantonese
- Box office: HK$6,631,890.00

Demoness from Thousand Years (Chinese: 千年女妖; Jyutping: Cin1 nin4 neoi5 jiu1; pinyin: Qiānnián nǚyāo), also known as Chase from Beyond, is a 1990 Hong Kong action fantasy horror film directed by Jeng Wing-Chiu. Some sources cite Hsiao Hu and Patrick Leung as additional directors.

== Synopsis ==
When the Demoness from a Thousand Years threatens to break into the real world, a Taoist priest sends his two fairy disciples to steal the Bead of Hell, which has the power to destroy the Demoness when combined with the Heaven's Sun Bead. Siu Yi gets trapped in a web, and Yun Yuk Yi has to traverse the modern world alone until she meets rookie police officer Mambo.

Ultimately, the defeat of the evil requires an innocent person to commit suicide, so Mambo quickly shoots himself in the head. Yun Yuk Yi sacrifices herself to save Mambo, who encounters Siu Yi, now appearing as a boardwalk vendor as he searches aimlessly for Yun Yuk Yi.

== Cast ==
- Joey Wong as Yun Yuk Yi
- Jacky Cheung as Mambo
- Meg Lam as the Evil
- Andy Hui as An
- Tai Chi Squadron as the Gang Members
- Tiffany Lau as Yin
- Michelle Sima as Policeman
- Hsiao Ho as Modern Sifu
- Gloria Yip as Siu Yi
- Ku Feng as Ancient Sifu (cameo appearance)
- Law Ching-Ho as Policeman
- Walter Tso as the Retarded Boy's Father (cameo appearance)
- Sin-hung Tamas the Retarded Boy's Mother (cameo appearance)
- Gabriel Wong as the Retarded Boy (cameo appearance)
- Yeung Wai-Yiu
- Chow Gam-Kong as the Victim
- Cheung Siu in an extra appearance

== Production ==
The film's sound recordists are at 108 Records Ltd., Co. (108 錄音有限公司) and Cinefex Sound Studio Limited (特藝錄音室). Its special effects was made by Stephen Ma (馬文現).

== Reception ==
Demoness from Thousand Years has received mixed reception for its "H. K. Screen Art-inspired" special effects after The Child of Peach.

=== Box office ===
The film grossed HK$6,631,890 at the Hong Kong box office during its theatrical run from 7 September to 23 September 1990.
