= Shams al-Din al-Khafri =

Persian astronomer

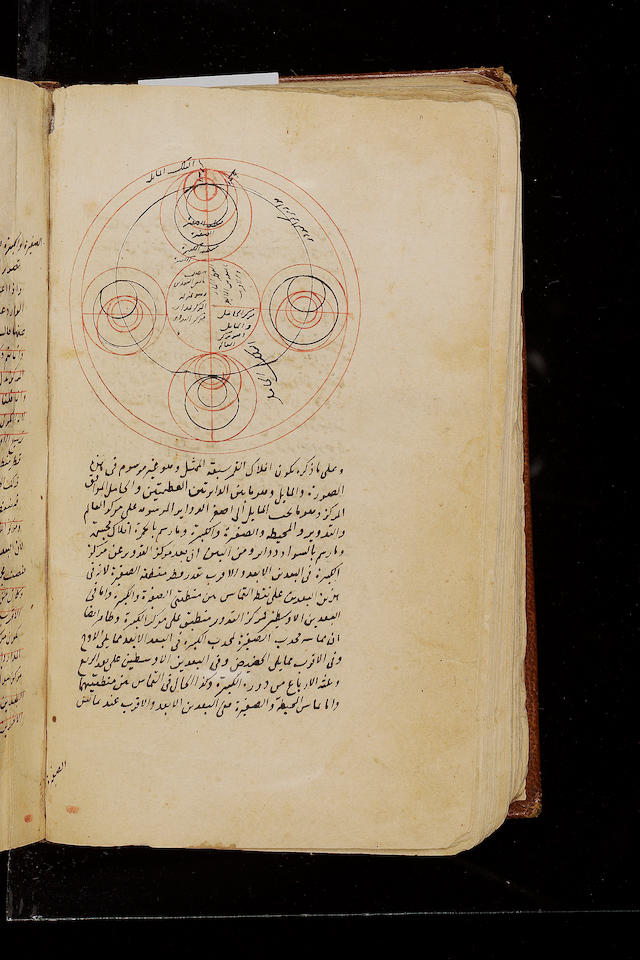
Al-Sharif al-Jurjani, a revision of Nasir al-Din Tusi's Tazkirah, a treatise on astronomy with extensive annotations and corrections by Shams al-Din Khafri. Created in Iran, probably Shiraz, the manuscript was created in the early 15th century; Khafri's commentaries were added to it in the 16th century

Shams al-Din Muhammad b. Ahmad al-Khafri al-Kashi (died 1550), Persian: محمد بن احمد خَفری known as Khafri, was an Iranian religious scholar and astronomer at the beginning of the Safavid dynasty. Before the arrival of Sheikh Baha'i in Iran, he was appointed as the major Shia jurist in the Safavid court. He was born in the city of Ḵafr, south east of Firuzābād in the region of Fārs. His exact date of birth is unknown but historical accounts estimate the date of his birth to be around the 1480s. He wrote on philosophy, religion, and astronomy, with the latter including a commentary on al-Tusi and critiques of al-Shirazi. Al-Khafri wrote works on theology and astronomy, indicating that Islamic scholars in his time and place saw no contradictions between Islam and science.

== Astronomy ==
Khafri was a theoretical astronomer who developed new planetary theories in a period beyond the supposed period of decline of Islamicate science, and is one of many examples that help dispel the theory that Islamicate scientists did not contribute much after the 12th century.

- al-Takmila fi sharh al-tadhkira (The complement to the explanation of the memento) This commentary by al-Khafri is a technical commentary on a work written by al-Sharif al-Jurjani on the astronomical critique by Nasir al-Din al-Tusi's of ptolemaic astronomy, al-Tadhkira fi 'ilm al-Hay'a (Memento in astronomy). In his commentary, Khafri contributes some original solutions to the problematic equant proposed by Ptolemy, which asserts that the axis around which a planetary sphere uniformly rotates around is not in the center of a planetary sphere. Al-Tusi solved this problem with the use of his famous Tusi couple; however, he was unable to extend this solution to the model of Mercury. This prompted al-Khafri to propose four solutions: three for Mercury and one for the Moon. Khafri explicitly mentions at the beginning of his commentary that he does use the wording of al-Jurjani on certain topics, although he also introduces original work of his own. His solution for the Moon, like Ptolemy's original model, still contains the discrepancy for the Moon's distance that was fixed earlier by al-Shatir, of whose work he was apparently not aware of at the time.
- Muntaha al-idrak fi al-hay'a (The ultimate comprehension of astronomy) this was written as a commentary on Nihayat al-idrak fi dirayat al-aflak (the ultimate understanding of the knowledge of the orbs).
- Hall ma la yanhall (The resolution of that which cannot be resolved)

== Disciples ==
- Shah Tahir

== See also ==
- Persian science
- al-Tusi
- al-Shirazi
- Islamic Golden Age
- Islamic science
- Islamic scholars
- List of Muslim scholars
- List of Shi'a Muslims
- List of Iranian scientists
