= Magnificent Warriors =

1987 Hong Kong film by David Chung

- Film poster
- Traditional Chinese: 中華戰士
- Simplified Chinese: 中华战士
- Hanyu Pinyin: Zhōnghuá zhànshì
- Jyutping: Zung1waa4 zin3si6
- Directed by: David Chung
- Written by: Tsang Kan-cheung
- Produced by: John Shum; Linda Kuk
- Starring: Michelle Yeoh; Yee Tung-shing; Ng Yiu-hon; Hwang Jang Lee
- Cinematography: Ma Chun-wah; Law Wan-shing
- Edited by: Cheung Kwok-Kuen
- Music by: Chan Wing-leung; Chow Gam-cheung
- Distributed by: D & B Films Co., Ltd.
- Release date: 16 April 1987
- Running time: 91 minutes
- Country: Hong Kong
- Language: Cantonese
- Box office: HK$8,324,957

Magnificent Warriors (Chinese: 中華戰士; lit. 'Chinese warriors'; also known as Dynamite Fighters) is a 1987 Hong Kong action adventure film directed by David Chung. The film stars Michelle Yeoh, Yee Tung-shing, Ng Yiu-hon and Hwang Jang-lee.

== Plot ==
Some time during the 1930s amidst the Second Sino-Japanese War, Chinese secret agent Fok Ming-ming is sent to Kaa Yi near Tibet to investigate the Japanese occupation that has been set up there. Ming-ming meets with Secret Agent 001, another Chinese secret agent who is to be her contact in Kaa Yi. They first run into a conman and then a rebellious princess, Chin-chin, who join them on their adventures.

Ming-ming and her friends discover that the Japanese occupation plans to convert the town into a weapons manufacturing site, but they are captured before they can warn the locals. Before the group are to be executed (along with Youda, Chin-chin's lover and a local aristocrat who stands up to the Japanese despite initially colluding with them), the locals chant for their release and the local Kaa Yi army turns on the Japanese, firing at the Japanese command and freeing Ming-ming and her friends. The once peaceful citizens of Kaa Yi then prepare to defend their town against the Imperial Japanese Army, under the guidance of Ming-ming and her friends.

== Cast ==
- Michelle Yeoh as Fok Ming-ming
- Yee Tung-Sing as Secret Agent 001
- Ng Yiu-hon as Drifter Conman
- Lo Koon-Ting as Youda
- Lau Chin-Dai as Chin-chin
- Matsui Tetsuya as General Toga
- Hwang Jang-lee as General Toga's Henchman #1
- Lo Mang as General Toga's Henchman #2
- Jing Chen as Gunrunner
- Chiu Chi-ling as One of revenge seeking trio #1
- Jackson Ng Yuk-sue as One of revenge seeking trio #2
- Fung Hak-on as Japanese agent
- Ku Feng as Ming's Grandfather

== Reception ==
Louder Than War described the film as having an "Indiana Jones flavour" and praised the film as "rip-roaring stuff." Starburst gave the film three stars and said it featured "some of the finest stunt work of this golden period."

== Home media ==
On 21 May 2001, DVD was released by Hong Kong Legends at UK in Region 2.

Five years later, The Michelle Yeoh Collection DVD were released on 9 January 2006 at 3 disc set including two films they were: Police Assassins and Wing Chun.

On 20 February 2023, Eureka Video UK released the film on Blu-ray as a limited edition release. Extras included commentary tracks from Asian cinema expert Frank Djeng and action cinema experts Mike Leeder and Arne Venema, vintage interviews with Yeoh, and the original theatrical cut complete with its original end credit ending. This followed the earlier US release on 13 December 2022 by 88 Films with similar extras.
