= Story of Kennedy Town =

1990 Hong Kong film by Wu Ma

- Film poster

Chinese name
- Traditional Chinese: 西環的故事
- Simplified Chinese: 西环的故事
Transcriptions
Standard Mandarin
- Hanyu Pinyin: Xī Huán De Gù Shì
Yue: Cantonese
- Jyutping: Sai1 Waan4 Dik1 Goo3 Si6
- Directed by: Wu Ma
- Written by: Wu Ma
- Produced by: Jackie Chan
- Starring: Waise Lee; Mark Cheng; Aaron Kwok; Sharla Cheung; May Lo
- Cinematography: Raymond Lam Fai-tai
- Edited by: Ng Wang-hung; Peter Cheung
- Music by: Johnny Yeung
- Production company: Golden Way Films
- Distributed by: Golden Harvest
- Release date: 16 November 1990
- Running time: 92 minutes
- Country: Hong Kong
- Language: Cantonese
- Box office: HK$3,618,814

Story of Kennedy Town (Chinese: 西環的故事) is a 1990 Hong Kong action drama film directed by Wu Ma and starring Waise Lee, Mark Cheng and Aaron Kwok as three close friends living in poverty whom decide to join the police force. However, one of them becomes consumed by greed and their friendship becomes tested.

== Cast and roles ==
- Waise Lee as Chong Pang
- Mark Cheng as Ko Tim-keung
- Aaron Kwok as Lee Siu-wai
- Sharla Cheung as Lai
- May Lo as Wai-sum
- Bill Tung as Uncle Chiu
- Tai Po as Chuen
- Wu Ma as Detective Sergeant Wong
- Chu Tau as thug
- Billy Ching as Mak Ying
- Chun Kwai-bo as Ying's thug
- Jameson Lam as Ying's thug

== Box office ==
The film grossed HK$3,618,814 at the Hong Kong box office during its theatrical run from 16 November to 30 November 1990.

== See also ==
- Kennedy Town
- Aaron Kwok filmography
- Jackie Chan filmography
