= A Book of Heroes =

1986 Taiwanese-Hong Kong film by Kevin Chu

- Film poster
- Directed by: Kevin Chu
- Written by: Hsieh Hsing-kuo
- Produced by: Raymond Wong Pak-ming
- Starring: Yasuaki Kurata; Yukari Oshima
- Cinematography: Liao Ching-sung
- Edited by: Huang Chiu-Kuei
- Music by: Fu Li
- Production companies: Cinema City Company; Golden Princess Amusement
- Distributed by: Long Shong Pictures
- Release date: 25 July 1986 (Taiwan)
- Running time: 81 minutes
- Countries: Taiwan; Hong Kong
- Languages: Mandarin; Cantonese (dubbed); Hokkien

A Book of Heroes (Chinese: 歡樂龍虎榜, released in the Philippines as Fight to Win Again) is a 1986 action comedy film directed by Kevin Chu, produced by Raymond Wong Pak-ming, and starring Yasuaki Kurata and Yukari Oshima. The film is a Taiwanese-Hong Kong co-production.

== Plot ==
Policeman Hu Pai and his girlfriend are on a quest to find stolen gold before the Yamashita gang can get to it. Meanwhile, Oshima Yamashita is unaware that his hired fighter is actually an undercover cop.

== Cast ==
- Yasuaki Kurata as Oshima Yamashita
- Yukari Oshima as Yamashita's hired fighter
- Hu Kua as Hu Pai
- David Tao as David
- Elsa Yang as Yang Shan Shan
- Bin Bin as kid at bachelor club

== Release ==
A Book of Heroes was released in Taiwan in 1986. In the Philippines, the film was released as Fight to Win Again by Pioneer Releasing on 25 August 1987, connecting it to the unrelated Hong Kong film The Magic Crystal (released as Fight to Win in the country); posters credited Yukari Oshima and Yasuaki Kurata as Cynthia Luster and Shoji Karada respectively.

== Home media ==
A Book of Heroes was first released on VCD in Hong Kong by Joy Sales on 22 November 2007; it has since gone out of print. The online store FLK Cinema, which originated in Clapham, London, also released the film on DVD-R (with the title Fight to Win Again).

== Critical reception ==
The Encyclopedia of Martial Arts Movies authors Bill Palmer, Karen Palmer, and Ric Meyers gave the film three and a half out of four stars, indicating a "Very Good" quality.
