= Inspector Pink Dragon =

1991 Hong Kong film by Gordon Chan

- Film poster
- Traditional Chinese: 神探馬如龍
- Simplified Chinese: 神探马如龙
- Hanyu Pinyin: Shén Tàn Mǎ Rú Lóng
- Jyutping: San4 Taam3 Maa2 Jyu4 Lung4
- Directed by: Gordon Chan
- Written by: John Chan
- Produced by: Lawrence Cheng; Chua Lam
- Starring: Lawrence Cheng; Rosamund Kwan; Waise Lee; Damian Lau; Nina Li Chi; Vindy Chan; Tony Leung Ka-fai; Lily Lee; Kenneth Tsang
- Cinematography: Cheng Siu-Keung
- Edited by: Chan Kei-hop
- Music by: Lam Miu-uak; Blue Max Productions
- Production companies: Golden Harvest Productions; Paragon Films
- Distributed by: Golden Harvest
- Release date: 7 November 1991
- Running time: 94 minutes
- Country: Hong Kong
- Language: Cantonese
- Box office: HK$8,179,321

Inspector Pink Dragon is a 1991 Hong Kong action comedy film directed by Gordon Chan, written by John Chan, and starring Lawrence Cheng, who produced with Chua Lam. The film is also one of the earliest Hong Kong productions shot in sync sound.

== Plot ==
Inspector Ma Yue-lung (Lawrence Cheng) bumps into his ex-classmate and longtime lover, Julia (Rosamund Kwan), while catching a thief. They both later go to an alumni reunion and see another ex-classmate, Ma Yau-yau (Tony Leung Ka-fai), who is now Julia's superior. When Yau returns home, he is murdered by Peter (Peter Lai). Heavy Crime Bureau chief Pau Yu Chat (Kenneth Tsang) sends Lung to go undercover to take Yau's job. After Lung goes undercover, he rises in rank and his paychecks increase. Julia also begins to develop feelings for Lung. Lung's girlfriend, Ching (Nina Li Chi), suspects that something is wrong with Lung. Later, Julia brings Lung to meet a land developer, Tang Kwok-kiu (Damian Lau). During that time, another murder case comes up. Lung later finds out that Tang is the mastermind behind this, but he, Julia and Ching has become Tang's chests. Another inspector, Shek Chun (Waise Lee), then gathers evidence and is determined to bring Tang to justice.

== Cast ==
Cast	Role
Lawrence Cheng	Inspector Ma Yue-lung (Pink Dragon)
Rosamund Kwan	Julia
Waise Lee	Inspector Shek Chun
Damian Lau	Tang Kwok-kiu
Nina Li Chi	Ching
Vindy Chan	Ma Yue-fung
Tony Leung Ka-fai	Ma Yau-yau (guest star)
Lily Lee	CID, Shek's assistant
Kenneth Tsang	Chief Inspector Pau Yu-chat
Kingdom Yuen	Emmanuelle
Lawrence Lau	Fatty Lan
Fruit Chan	Popsicle seller
Peter Lai	Peter
Suki Kwan	Ma Yau-yau's wife
Dion Lam	Guard at Tang's mansion
Chung Wing	Tang's thug
Teddy Chan	CID
Allan Fung	KC Fung
Angela Fong Hiu-hung	Yu Tai No
Brenda Lo	Fatty Grandma
Shirley Lau	
Chan Wing-chiu	Hi-Fi Teacher
Simon Leung	
Kent Chow	
Paul Cheng	CID
Lau Yin-tak	

== See also ==
- Hong Kong films of 1991

== Notes ==
- The Chinese name of Lawrence Cheng's character (馬如龍) is the same name of Jackie Chan's character in Project A. Chan's character also has an English name, Dragon Ma, while Cheng's does not.
- The Chinese name of Tony Leung Ka-fai's character (馬友友) is also the Chinese name of famed celloist Yo-Yo Ma.

== Box office ==
The film grossed HK$8,179,321 at the Hong Kong box office.
