= Miracles (1989 film) =

1989 Hong Kong film by Jackie Chan

- Hong Kong film poster
- Traditional Chinese: 奇蹟
- Simplified Chinese: 奇迹
- Hanyu Pinyin: Qí Jī
- Jyutping: Kei4 Zik1
- Directed by: Jackie Chan
- Written by: Jackie Chan; Edward Tang
- Produced by: Leonard Ho; Raymond Chow
- Starring: Jackie Chan; Anita Mui; Gua Ah-leh; Ko Chun-hsiung; Wu Ma; Bill Tung; Richard Ng; Gloria Yip
- Cinematography: Arthur Wong; Peter Ngor; Au Gaam-Hung; Cho Wai-Kei; Lee San-Yip; Choi Wa-Sing
- Edited by: Peter Cheung
- Music by: Su Cong; Michael Lai
- Distributed by: Golden Harvest
- Release date: 15 June 1989
- Running time: 127 minutes
- Country: Hong Kong
- Language: Cantonese
- Budget: HK $64,000,000
- Box office: HK $34,036,029

Miracles (Chinese: 奇蹟; pinyin: qí jī; Jyutping: kei zik; released under various titles for several territories worldwide) is a 1989 Hong Kong crime action comedy film starring and directed by Jackie Chan, and written by Chan and Edward Tang. It is set in 1930s Hong Kong and is an adaptation of Frank Capra's Lady for a Day (1933) and Pocketful of Miracles (1961), which in turn were based on "Madame La Gimp", a 1929 short story by Damon Runyon.

Miracles features many well-known Hong Kong actors, including Anita Mui and Wu Ma, and is considered one of Jackie Chan's most sophisticated directorial efforts. Chan is an ardent fan of Hollywood musicals, and Miracles pays a tribute to that genre. According to his autobiography, Chan stated that this was one of his favorite films he has made. The film was remade in Hindi as Singh Is Kinng with Akshay Kumar and Katrina Kaif.

== Plot ==
Kind-hearted country boy Kuo Cheng-Wah is cheated out of all his money by a man named Tung when he arrives in Hong Kong. Depressed and destitute, he encounters Madame Kao, a poor woman selling flowers on the street; she urges him to buy a red rose, saying it will bring him luck. He eventually agrees.

His fortunes take a turn when he stumbles into a gang war, and renders assistance to a dying gang leader. When Fei asks who will take his spot, the gang leader unwittingly makes Kuo his successor and dies. Kuo attributes his luck to Madame Kao's rose, and takes to buying one from her every day thereafter. This does not sit well with the gang, especially Fei, who feels that he was next in line to be the boss. Uncle Hoi, the boss' right-hand man, helps Kuo adjust to being the boss. In a fight to test his toughness, Kuo wins the gang's respect, with the exception of Fei.

Kuo reluctantly accepts being a gangster boss and tries to find a different way to legitimately make a living for himself and his gang. When singer Yang Luming comes to him with money to pay off a debt the previous boss had loaned to her dad, Uncle Hoi comes up with the idea to open a nightclub. At the opening of the nightclub, rival boss Tiger arrives, hoping to muscle his way into half of the shares of the club. The police and Inspector Ho soon interrupt the show. In Kuo's office, Ho privately tells him his plan to bring both gangs to jail. Ho leaves Kuo with Uncle Hoi, who tells Kuo everyone knows what they talked about since Ho always uses the same lines.

Before a meeting with Tiger, Kuo goes to buy his usual rose from Madame Kao, but she is not at her post. Because of this, he is caught up at a fight in a restaurant. The fight ends when Tiger stops a fan from falling on Kuo, who dives out of his way to grab a rose. About to be taken for ransom by Tiger, he is saved again by Ho. Afterwards, Kuo searches for Madame Kao, and finds her upset over a letter she has just received. The letter is from her daughter, Belle, a student in Shanghai whom Madame Kao has been supporting, all the time while concealing her sufferings and leading her to believe that she is a rich society woman in Hong Kong. She now comes to visit Madame Kao, bringing her wealthy fiancé and his father, but Madame Kao is afraid that her poverty will bring disgrace to her daughter. Through Luming's persuasion, Kuo offers to help, buying Madame Kao expensive new clothes and arranging a lavish party for her, to which he invites some of his disreputable friends, including Tung as her husband, on the condition that they impersonate the local dignitaries. Kuo accidentally agrees to the wedding in which he later on decides to get the gangs to act as rich dignitaries. The gang begins to tie up and kidnap photographers and business people to cover-up Madame Kao's secret.

Meanwhile, Fei has manipulated Tiger into thinking Kuo had some of his men killed when they were trying to bring him in for a negotiation. In reality, they were simply being held captive. On the eve of the party, Kuo tries to get to Ho but is instead captured by Tiger and taken to a rope factory run by Fei. It is now clear to Kuo that Fei has been behind the scenes of all the strife. However, as Tiger is about to shoot Kuo, Tiger's missing men return, proving Kuo's innocence. Tiger sees this as an internal struggle and lets Kuo and Fei sort things out on their own with assurance from Tiger that there is no foul play. After a fight in the factory with Fei's men, Kuo triumphs. Fei is ready to fight Kuo himself, but Kuo wants to solve their issues peacefully, and more importantly get back to Madame Kao's situation, winning Tiger's respect in the process.

After canceling the party and getting rid of the gangs that will play the rich dignitaries, Kuo tries to convince the real dignitaries of Hong Kong to help him. Madame Kao is about to confess to Belle's fiancé and her father the truth when the real dignitaries come in for the party, Kuo having convinced them that he could not do this without them.

Belle and her fiancé later take a ship back to Shanghai. Ho, wanted for embezzlement and abuse of power when he was conned by Tung, is also on the ship.

== Cast ==
- Jackie Chan as 'Charlie' Kuo Chen Wah
- Anita Mui as Yang Luming
- Gua Ah-leh as Madam Kao (Lady Rose) (as Yah-Leh Gui)
- Chun Hsiung Ko as Tiger
- Wu Ma as Uncle Hoi
- Fong Kong as Uncle Hoi previous gangster boss
- Lo Lieh as Fei
- Bill Tung as Tung
- Gloria Yip as Belle Kao
- Richard Ng as Chief Inspector Ho
- Simon Yam as Chief Inspector Ho's man
- Jacky Cheung as Bespectacled Clerk
- Billy Lau as Ah Tong
- David Lui as Snake Ming
- Tien Feng as Elder Ko / Wong
- Mars as Police sergeant
- Yuen Biao as Beggar (cameo)
- Wong Wai as supreme Court Judge
- Chor Yuen as chairman of the court
- Ken Lo as guard of Tiger
- Lee Hoi Shan as guard of Kuo
- Amy Yip as sexy dancer (cameo)

== Production ==
In the interview with Chan on the Hong Kong Legends DVD, he talks about the notable differences between how US directors shoot their films in comparison to his own methods. He gives the example that American filmmakers tend to move the camera to emphasise the frenetic nature of the action, but in action scenes in Chan's films, he keeps the camera steady. Chan also discusses Arthur Wong's steady cam crane shot during the song "Rose, Rose I Love You" (sung by Anita Mui). In a single shot, the camera begins with an overhead view of Tiger as he leaves the Ritz. Kuo glances at Tiger and then the camera sweeps left to a top view shot of Yang Luming singing in front of her dancers.

The film's production was beset with problems, including a reported typhoon that destroyed many of the film sets and forced a rebuild in order to finish the production; and Chan sustained an injury, a deep cut over his left eye, while performing a stunt in which he flipped backwards onto a rickshaw.

The film was produced from December 1988 to March 1989.

== Release ==
Miracles was released under several alternate titles in different territories, including:

- Mr. Canton and Lady Rose (Hong Kong English title)
- The Canton Godfather (Australia)
- Gangster (Philippines)
- Miracles: The Canton Godfather (United Kingdom video title)
- Black Dragon (United States)

=== International version ===
The original Hong Kong cut of Miracles had a running time of 127 minutes. Several major scenes were cut for the 102-minute international version. These include:

- Kuo Cheng-Wah and Chief Inspector Ho having a private conversation.
- Yang Luming's dress is torn and she has an argument with Kuo Cheng-Wah.
- Scenes with Chief Inspector Ho in a police station.
- Yang Luming talking to Mr Wong on the phone in English.
- A subplot between Chief Inspector Ho and Tung about money.
- Kuo Cheng-Wah and Yang Luming try to teach the gangs to act as local dignitaries.

=== Box office ===
Miracles took HK $34,036,029 at the Hong Kong box office.

=== Critical response ===
Rotten Tomatoes, a review aggregator, reports that 60% of five surveyed critics gave the film a positive review; the average rating was 7.2/10.

== Accolades ==
- 9th Hong Kong Film Awards
  - Won: Best Action Choreography (Jackie Chan Stunt Team)
  - Nomination: Best Actor (Jackie Chan)
  - Nomination: Best Art Direction (Eddie Ma)
  - Nomination: Best Film Editing (Peter Cheung)

== See also ==
- Jackie Chan filmography
- List of Hong Kong films
