= Mike Kim =

Korean-American journalist (born 1976)

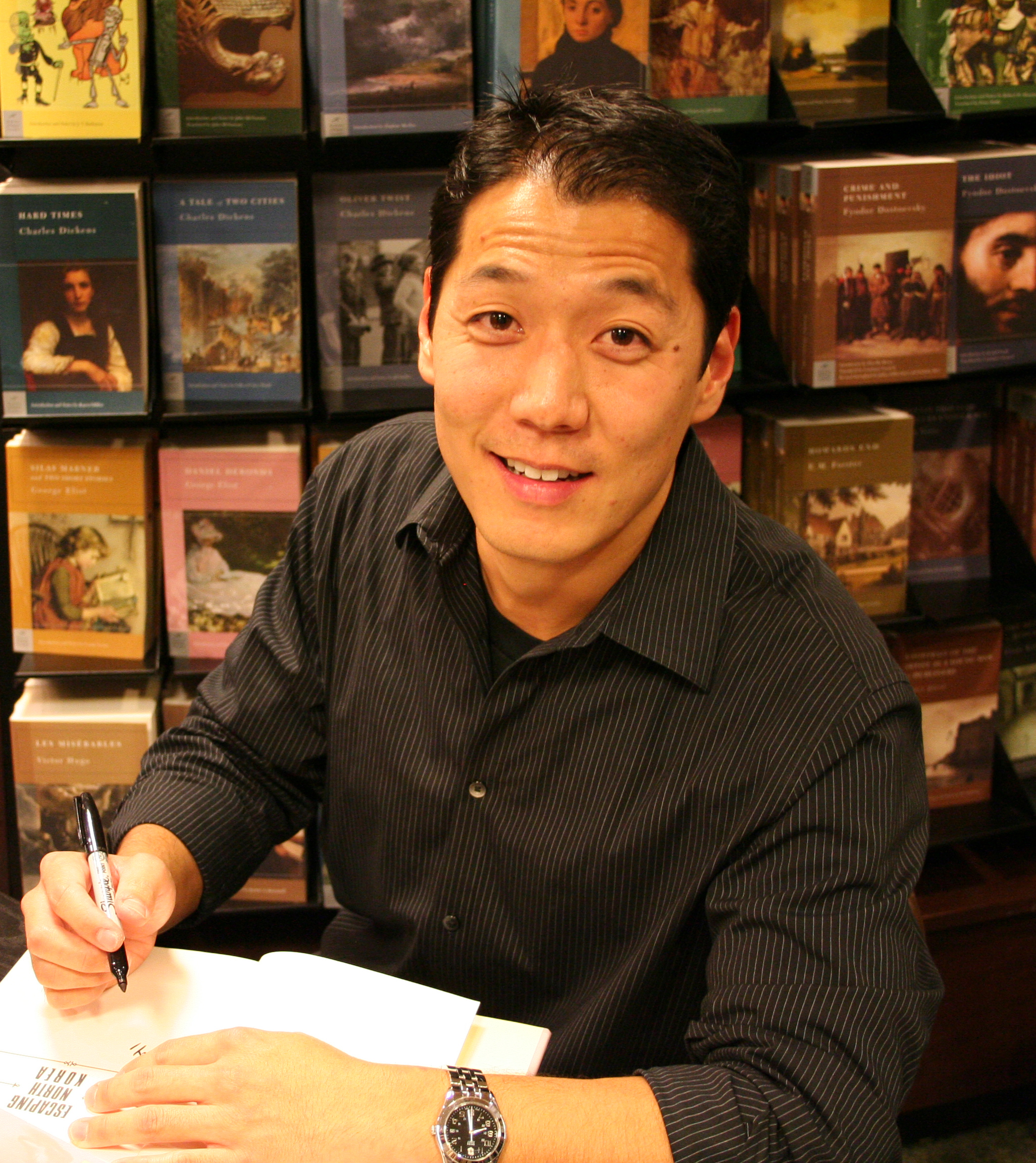
- Born: December 11, 1976 (age 49)
- Occupations: Consultant, Author, Public Speaker

Mike Kim (born December 11, 1976) is a business consultant, author, keynote speaker, and nonprofit founder. From 2003-2006, he lived at the China–North Korea border from 2003-2006 and founded Crossing Borders, a nonprofit dedicated to providing humanitarian assistance to North Korean refugees.

Kim is the author of the Wall Street Journal featured book Escaping North Korea: Defiance and Hope in the World’s Most Repressive Country, a current events memoir published in 2008 by Rowman & Littlefield (subsequently acquired by Bloomsbury), about his experiences at the China-North Korea border when taking time off from business to help North Korean refugees and human trafficking victims through the modern-day 6,000 mile underground railroad in Asia. Escaping North Korea has been translated into Turkish and Polish.

== Crossing Borders and Escaping North Korea ==
On New Year's Day 2003, Kim decided to take some time off of business and gave up his financial planning business in Chicago, Illinois, and left for China on a one-way ticket carrying little more than two duffle bags. While living near the North Korean border, he operated undercover as a student of North Korean taekwondo, training under two North Korean masters —eventually receiving a second-degree blackbelt (he is also a Brazilian jiu-jitsu purple belt). He founded Crossing Borders, a nonprofit dedicated to providing humanitarian assistance to North Korean refugees.

In interviews, Kim has referred to the late Ambassador Mark Palmer as a mentor and a person who has deeply influenced him by his example of working effectively in the business, nonprofit, and government sectors. Palmer wrote the foreword to Escaping North Korea and commented, “This is a story of heroes. Of North Koreans increasingly and courageously evading the dictates of the system at home to survive and risking their lives to flee the world's most repressive dictatorship. And of a heroic young Korean American, the author, Mike Kim, who risked his own life for four years on the China-North Korea border to help them." In June 2010, Kim was voted in as a term member of the Council on Foreign Relations.

Kim frequently appears in the media: He was a guest on The Daily Show with Jon Stewart and has appeared in The Wall Street Journal and on CNN's Anderson Cooper 360. He has been interviewed by major domestic and international media groups such as Fox News (with Bill Hemmer), BBC, Reuters, Canadian Broadcasting Corporation, Yonhap News Agency, The Korea Times, The Korea Daily, Korean Broadcasting System, Tokyo Shimbun, and The Japan Times.

He continues to support Crossing Borders as a donor and board member emeritus.

== Career After Crossing Borders and Escaping North Korea ==
After completing his MBA at Georgetown University's McDonough School of Business, Kim continued to work across the startup, management consulting, and nonprofit sectors.

Kim is the founder of Gradient Consulting, a Tokyo-based firm that advises startups on market entry and expansion across Japan, Korea, and the Asia-Pacific region. He works with leading U.S. venture capital firms and their portfolio companies to secure customers, build strategic partnerships, and accelerate revenue growth in Asia.

Kim has written articles for major publications. He is a columnist for The Japan News (Yomiuri Shimbun), where he writes on the adoption of startup technology and business trends in Japan.

Kim is active in speaking engagements around the world, having addressed audiences at a variety of major companies, universities, and government organizations across five continents.
