= Devoted to You (film) =

1986 Hong Kong film by Clifton Ko

- Movie poster
- Traditional Chinese: 痴心的我
- Simplified Chinese: 痴心的我
- Hanyu Pinyin: chī xīn de wǒ
- Jyutping: ci1 sam1 dik1 ngo5
- Directed by: Clifton Ko
- Written by: Clifton Ko
- Produced by: Linda Kuk
- Starring: Jacky Cheung; May Lo; Loletta Lee; Michael Wong
- Cinematography: Bob Thompson; Chan Hon-Wing; Derek Wan Man-Kit; Poon Hang-Sang
- Edited by: Wong Yee-Shun; Jue San-Git
- Music by: Juk Gam-bo
- Production companies: D & B Films Co., Ltd
- Distributed by: D & B Films Co., Ltd
- Release date: 11 April 1986 (Hong Kong)
- Running time: 87 minutes
- Country: Hong Kong
- Language: Cantonese
- Box office: HK $7,469,783.00

Devoted to You (Chinese: 痴心的我; pinyin: chī xīn de wǒ) also known as Then Nice Two Coutles (我已成年) is a 1986 Hong Kong romantic film directed by Clifton Ko, it stars Jacky Cheung, May Lo, Loletta Lee and Michael Wong (actor). The film ran in theaters from 11 April 1986 until 24 April 1989.

== Plot ==
Jane (Loletta Lee), born in a lower-class family, is a rebellious girl. She gets sent to a famous high-class high school by her parents, she gets bullied by other students all the time. On the other hand, May (May Lo), born into a rich family, is a spoiled girl. Bullied and Isolated by her classmates, Jane keeps it all to herself. After seeing this, May pranks Jane's bullies for bullying her. Soon after school, May gets beaten up by Jane's bullies, Jane comes and rescues May from being humiliated. After that, they become good friends. One day, Jane and May are in a coffee shop, she dares May to get the phone number of a boy outside their coffee shop, she learns that he's called Jacky (Jacky Cheung), who comes to Hong Kong for a holiday from Canada. Although May knows he has a girlfriend in Canada, May finds herself falling in love with Jacky. They spend the last day of his Hong Kong trip romantically. After Jacky goes back to Canada, May decides to go to Canada to live with Jacky, only to find out Jacky really has a girlfriend, she realizes she is a fool and goes back to Hong Kong crying. Meanwhile, Jane meets a motorcyclist called Michael (Michael Wong (actor)), who is part of a gang. The fall in love with each other quickly. After Michael gets killed by some gangsters, Jane realizes the important of family love. She decides to make a fresh start to her life.

== Cast ==
- May Lo as May (阿美) - Rich and spoiled, falls in love with Jacky even though he has a girlfriend
- Jacky Cheung as Jacky (积奇)- Studies in Canada, went back to Hong Kong for a holiday, falls in love with May
- Loletta Lee as Jane (阿珍) - Poor and rebellious, falls in love with Michael
- Michael Wong as Michael (米高) - Falls in love with Jane, gets killed by some gangsters
- Ku Feng as Jane's father - Grumpy and careless
- Chiao Chiao as Jane's mother - Very protective over her daughter
- Tin Ching as Jane's grandfather - Gives parenting advises to Jane's parents
- Timothy Zao as Jane's brother - Obey his parents, likes to watch TV
- Lau Siu-Ming as May's father - The chairman of May's school
- Tien Lie as May's mother - Likes to spoil her daughter
- Priscilla Chan as Priscilla - Jacky's Canadian girlfriend
- Pamela Pak Wan-kam as Jane's teacher
- Gam Biu as School vice principal
- Teddy Yip Wing-Cho as School principal
- Bill Tung Biu as TV race course commentator
- Fruit Chan Goh as Thug
- Clifton Ko as Guy at beach (cameo)

== Jacky Cheung and May Lo ==
Famous Hong Kong actor and singer Jacky Cheung met his future spouse May Lo while filming this film. Once in an interview, Jacky said this film changed his life, he said "At the time I was clueless. I thought I had to take everything seriously and it had to be real. I was young at the time, so it influenced my life. I really fell in love." Jacky was unable to get out of character, and ended up dating May in real life. They got married in 1996, the couple is now blessed with two daughters.

== Critical response ==
On IMDb, it received an average rating of 6.2 out of 10 based on 23 reviews.

On the Chinese movie review website, Douban, it received an average rating of 7.4 out of 10 based on 1098 user reviews.
