= Mimi Zhu =

Chinese-Australian author, writer, and artist

Mimi Zhu is a queer Chinese–Australian author, writer, and artist based in Brooklyn, New York. Their work has been featured in The New York Times, PAPER, i-D, The Guardian, Printed Matter, VICE, and more.

== Life ==
Zhu was born in Australia to Chinese immigrant parents, and grew up in Brisbane and Singapore. In 2018, they moved to the United States and works as a writer, artist, and community organizer.

Although Zhu had been a lifelong writer, they began crafting with words intentionally as a way to heal from a traumatic abusive relationship in their early twenties. Zhu describes their start to writing "one night, alone in their room, free writing in a journal." Zhu described the feeling as "being in [their] body after such a long time" and from that point onwards, they "wrote to heal."

They explore the intersections of love and fear in their weekly newsletter "Write, to Heal," as well as to a broader audience on their Instagram page.

== Work ==
=== Be Not Afraid of Love: Lessons on Fear, Intimacy, and Connection ===
Be Not Afraid of Love is Zhu's debut non-fiction book, published in August 2022 by Penguin Random House. The memoir-in-essays explores the intersections of love and fear in self-esteem, friendship, family dynamics, and romantic relationships, and extends out to its effects on society and the greater political realm.

Throughout the book, Zhu deploys "rigorous citation," a framework they attribute to their friend Neema Githere. Zhu references Granger E. Westberg’s grief model to resources for mutual aid throughout the text, and draw as much from psychology, Buddhist philosophies, and the teachings of activists like bell hooks and Audre Lorde as they do from their own experiences.

Zhu jokes that the book's title has become a refrain of sorts among their friends. The title became like a prompt—and according to Zhu, it's because they "just know how afraid people, including myself, are of love."
