= Yukari Oshima =

Japanese actress (born 1963)

Yukari Ōshima 大島 ゆかり
- Born: Yukari Tsumura (津村 ゆかり); December 31, 1963 (age 62); Nishi-ku, Fukuoka, Japan
- Other name: Cynthia Luster
- Occupations: Actress, martial artist
- Years active: 1984–2005; 2011–present
- Spouse(s): Mark Cheng (1991–1995); Philip Ko (1995–2017)

Yukari Ōshima (大島 ゆかり, Ōshima Yukari; born December 31, 1963) is a Japanese actress and martial artist. She gained prominence in Hong Kong and became popular in the Philippines under the pseudonym Cynthia Luster. Due to Philippine interest in Jackie Chan, she has been referred to as his "female counterpart".

== Biography ==
Yukari Tsumura (津村 ゆかり, Tsumura Yukari) was born in Nishi-ku, Fukuoka, Japan, to a Japanese businessman and fashion designer and a Chinese mother. She began studying Gōjū-ryū Seigokan karate at Ennouji Dojo in junior high school.

She was one of Japan's brightest female martial artists during the 1980s and a leading figure in the "girls with guns" subgenre of Hong Kong action cinema. Oshima portrayed Farrah Cat in Choudenshi Bioman, which aired not only in Japan originally but also worldwide. She is best known to Western audiences as Yomi in Riki-Oh: The Story of Ricky (1991). After her Hong Kong career subsided, she moved to the Philippines in the 1990s and performed under the stage name Cynthia Luster.

Oshima now resides in Fukuoka, Japan, where she has promoted tourism in the city.

On December 20, 2025, she made a surprise visit to a fan meetup in Japan for former Hong Kong action star Hwang Jang Lee, who was celebrating his 81st birthday, moving him to tears.

== Selected filmography ==
=== Television ===
Year	Title	Role	Notes	Ref.			
Year	Title	Role	Notes	Ref.	1983	Space Sheriff Gavan	TV Series
Kagaku Sentai Dynaman	Doll Assassin	Ep. 28			1983		
1984	Space Sheriff Shaider		TV Series				
1985	Choudenshi Bioman	Farrah Cat	TV Series				
1986	Sukeban Deka II		Ep. 1				

=== Film ===
Year	English title		Original title	Role	Notes	Ref.
Year	International	Philippines	Original title	Role	Notes	Ref.
1984	Chodenshi Baioman the Movie		超電子バイオマン	Farrah Cat		
1986	Millionaires Express	China Warriors	富貴列車	Samurai		
1986	A Book of Heroes	Fight to Win Again	歡樂龍虎榜	Yamashita's fighter		
1986	The Funny Family		頑皮家族	Tempura		
1986	Kung Fu Wonder Child		靈幻童子	Hai Chiu Hse		
1987	Angel		天使行動	Madame Yeung / Sue (English version)		
1989	Final Run		目中無人	Mon Ta Yee-Wa		
1989	Burning Ambition		龍之爭霸	Chau Siao-Tao		
1989	Close Escape		飛越危牆	Migi		
1989	Lucky Seven 2		7小福 2			
1989	Framed		沉底鱷	Kitty Li		
1989	A Punch to Revenge		十面埋伏			
1990	Never Say Regret		無悔行動			
1990	Outlaw Brothers		最佳賊拍檔	Tequila		
1990	Angel's Mission		先發制人	Hing-tse		
1990	Brave Young Girls		黑海霸王花	Lady Overlord		
1990	Midnight Angel		午夜天使	Ying		
1990	That's Money		越軌行動	Typist		
1991	The Godfather's Daughter Mafia Blues		烈火情仇	Amy Lee		
1991	Riki-Oh: The Story of Ricky		力王	Huang Quan		
1991	Spiritually a Cop		駁腳差佬			
1991	Angel Force		天使特警	Arms Trafficker		
1991	The Angels		天使風雲			
1991	Ghost's Love		雲雨生死戀	Kicking policewoman		
1991	Devil Cat		貓變	Black Cat		
1991	The Story of the Gun		黑星風雲	Lin Ho-Hung		
1991	Dreaming the Reality		夢醒血未停			
1991	Gambling Ghost Are Ready		賭鬼總動員			
1992	Lover's Tear			Police officer		
1992	Full Contact		新龙争虎斗	Mrs Wang		
1992	Big Deal			Sim-Lan		
1992	The Direct Line			Mok Yu Xia, CID Madam		
1992	Nv Xiao Feng Yun: Xie Jiao Ru qin					
1992	Fatal Chase			Cynthia		
1992	Beauty Investigator			The Hitwoman		
1992	Jin San Jiao qun Ying hui			Bullet		
1992	Hard to kill					
1992	Mission of Justice					
1992	Patio					
1992	The Story of the Gun					
1992	Win Them All					
1993	Zong Heng Tian Xia				Uncredited	
1993	Angel the Kickboxer					
1993	Lethal Panther			Jane Matsuko/Shoko	In International version	
1993	Serious Shock! Yes Madam!			Coco		
1993	The Avenging Quartet			Oshima		
1993	Project S			Terrorist		
1993	Ghost's Love					
1993	Love to Kill					
1993	Angel of Vengeance					
1993	Kakambal Ko sa tapang			Michelle		
1993	Angel Terminators II			Bullet	Also known as The Best of Lady Kickboxers	
1993	1/3 Qing Ren			Lin Ching-Hsia		
1993	Xing Qi Gong Zhi Tan Bi					
1994	Once Upon a Time in Manila			Lt. Cynthia Wang	Cynthia Luster's first Filipino movie	
1994	Yue gui Zhi Lang					
1994	Pintsik			May Leng		
1994	His Way, Her Way, Their Ways!					
1994	Hong Tian mi Ling			Inspector Cynthia Lee Lai-Nga/Lisa Li		
1994	Deadly Target					
1995	Drug Fighters			Yi Chian		
1995	Kinkyu yobidashi - Emâjenshî kôru					
1995	Ultracop 2000			Trishia Marks		
1995	1/3 Lover		大島由加里			
1995	Emergency Call '95			Cameo		
1995	Hubungan Jenayah			Heung Lan		
1995	Power Connection					
1996	Guardian Angel					
1997	Tiger Angels					
1997	Tapang sa Tapang		沈诗芳-小慧欣	Jane Nakamoto		
1997	Super Cops			Interpol Agent Yukari		
1997	Challenge					
1997	Vengeance is Mine					
1998	Gold Rush					
1998	The Golden Nightmare			Nikki		
1998	Leopard Hunting			Chieko		
1998	To Kiss is Fatal			Diana Pama Aller		
1999	Digital Warriors			Jean Chung		
1999	Double Sin					
1999	It Takes a Thief					
2000	Hakata Movie: Chinchiromai			Fay Lan		
2001	Xtreme Warriors					
2001	Ashita wa kitto			Girl in grape field		
2011	Legendary Amazons			Zou Lanying	Final film role	

== General sources ==
- Williams, Tony (2000). "Yukari Oshima: Hong Kong Cinema's Japanese Panther; A career profile". Asian Cult Cinema. 28 (3rd Quarter): 44–47.
