= Dick Wei =

Taiwanese actor, director and writer

- Chinese: 狄威
- Born: Tu Jilong; April 15, 1953 (age 71); Zhutian, Pingtung County, Taiwan
- Other names: Ti Wai; Tiu Lung; Tu Long
- Occupation(s): Actor, action director
- Years active: 1973-2004, 2013-present

Chinese name
- Traditional Chinese: 狄威
- Simplified Chinese: 狄威
Transcriptions
Standard Mandarin
- Hanyu Pinyin: Dí Weī
Yue: Cantonese
- Jyutping: Dik^{6}Wai^{1}

Tu Jilong
- Traditional Chinese: 涂吉龍
- Simplified Chinese: 涂吉龙
Transcriptions
Standard Mandarin
- Hanyu Pinyin: Tú Jílóng
Yue: Cantonese
- Jyutping: Tou^{4} Gat^{1}-Lung^{4}

Dick Wei (Chinese: 狄威, born Tu Jilong 涂吉龍; born April 15, 1953) is a Taiwanese actor, director and writer who specializes in martial arts and action films.

== Early life and career ==
Dick Wei was born Tu Jilong in the town of Pingtung in southern Taiwan. He is of Hakka ancestry. He began studying martial arts in Junior High School, going on to win numerous competitions. He later served in the Taiwanese army, attaining the rank of captain, and was an instructor in unarmed combat, especially Tae Kwon Do. Prior his movie career, he also worked as a combat instructor for the Taiwanese police force. His first films were made while he was still in the army; most were low budget Taiwanese productions. His earlier movie appearances tended to be quite brief and he often played supporting or tertiary roles.

== Discovery ==
While operating a martial arts studio in Taipei, he was spotted by Chang Cheh who persuaded him to have a screen test which was shown to Sir Run Run Shaw. Impressed with the footage, Shaw signed him with the Shaw Brothers and he relocated to Hong Kong in 1977. Under the stage name "Tu Lung", he made several martial arts films with the studio including Five Deadly Venoms (1978), The Avenging Eagle (1978), Kid with the Golden Arm (1979), and The Kid With a Tattoo (1980).

In the early 1980s, he moved to Golden Harvest where he joined Sammo Hung's team of actors and stuntmen. Starring in films many of which were helmed by Hung, Dick Wei became known for playing villainous roles such as Suen in The Prodigal Son (1981), pirate king Lor Sam Pau in Project A (1983), and mountain bandit number 6 in Millionaires Express (1986). He also trained actresses Joyce Godenzi for her role in Eastern Condors, and Michelle Yeoh when the latter first began making martial arts movies.

== Later roles and directing ==
In 1989, Wei starred in and was action director for the film Dragon Fight. In 1991, he made his directional debut with the action film Visa to Hell and then, in 1994, directed the crime film, A Killing Order. He starred in and choreographed both projects.

Dissatisfied that he was constantly typecast as villains by Hong Kong film companies and directors, Dick Wei eventually returned to Taiwan where he turned his hand to directing and producing. He continued to work in Taiwanese television and starred in a number of movies, including some made-for-television. The early to mid-2000s saw a rapid decline in his film appearances and eventually, a complete stop altogether. It would not be until 2013 that he would star in another major film project, Hung Yan-yan's 7 Assassins, appearing alongside several veteran actors from the Golden Generation of Hong Kong cinema such as Felix Wong. The following years saw Dick Wei's steady return to filmmaking in which he starred primarily in action or martial arts films from Taiwan and mainland China, some of which were exclusively streamed via online platforms. He would also return to directing; in 2016, he directed and starred alongside Tony Liu and Chen Kuan-tai in a loose reboot of the 1980 film Encounters of the Spooky Kind. As of 2023, his most recent appearance was in the 2020 martial arts film, Chinese People The Soul of Wushu.

== Filmography ==
| Year | Title | Role | Notes |
|---|---|---|---|
| 1973 | Tiger Boxer | | |
| 1974 | The Assignment | | |
| 1976 | The One-armed Swordsmen | | Assistant Martial Arts Director |
| 1977 | Money Crazy | | |
| 1977 | The Brave Archer | Yang Tieh-hsin | |
| 1977 | Chinatown Kid | Kung Fu Student | |
| 1978 | Life Gamble | Jin Ba | |
| 1978 | The Brave Archer 2 | Beggar Sect Elder Jian | |
| 1978 | Shaolin Handlock | Li Pai | |
| 1978 | Five Deadly Venoms | Master | |
| 1978 | The Avenging Eagle | Han Sung | |
| 1978 | Heaven Sword and Dragon Sabre | | |
| 1978 | Invincible Shaolin | South Shaolin teacher #1 | |
| 1978 | Crippled Avengers | Tien Nan Tiger of the Southern Sky #1 | |
| 1979 | The Best Hustler Wins | | |
| 1979 | The Kung Fu Instructor | Meng Clan's Fighter | |
| 1979 | Kid with the Golden Arm | Sand Palm Fighter | |
| 1979 | To Kill A Mastermind | Yang security agent | |
| 1980 | Shaolin Hellgate | Jin Cha | |
| 1980 | Iron Chain Assassin | | |
| 1980 | Killer Constable | Suen-Heng | |
| 1980 | Kid with a Tattoo | Captain Fang | |
| 1980 | Swift Sword | Leng family fighter | |
| 1980 | A Deadly Secret | Wan Gui | |
| 1980 | Ten Tigers from Kwangtung | Wang Teng Ko | |
| 1980 | Lightning Kung Fu | | |
| 1981 | Family of Lust | Cheng Pei | |
| 1981 | The Prodigal Son | Suen | |
| 1981 | A Bride's Nightmare | | |
| 1982 | Carry On Pickpocket | Chou Meng-Sheng's Henchmen #5 | |
| 1983 | Winners and Sinners | Tar's Top Henchman | |
| 1983 | Zu Warriors from the Magic Mountain | Blue Army Commander | |
| 1983 | The Champions | Soccer King Gam | |
| 1983 | Project A | Lor Sam Pau | |
| 1984 | Pom Pom | Scarman | |
| 1984 | The Owl vs Bombo | Au Gung's Henchman | |
| 1985 | My Lucky Stars | Gang Member | |
| 1985 | Mismatched Couples | Fight champion | |
| 1985 | Twinkle, Twinkle Lucky Stars | Warehouse Thug #3 | |
| 1985 | Heart of Dragon | Kim's Man #1 | |
| 1985 | Yes, Madam | Willie | |
| 1985 | Night Caller | Allan Lee | |
| 1985 | Eastern Kung Fu God | | |
| 1986 | Millionaires Express | Mountain Bandit #6 | |
| 1986 | Witch from Nepal | The Warrior | |
| 1986 | Rosa | Thug in Suit | |
| 1986 | Kung Fu Kids II | Gam/Golden Yama Wong Er Lung | |
| 1986 | The Seventh Curse | Huh Lung | |
| 1986 | A Heroic Fight | Wai | |
| 1986 | Bloody Revenge | | |
| 1987 | Code of Honor | Mak Chi-Chieh | |
| 1987 | Eastern Condors | Elite Vietnamese soldier | |
| 1987 | Project A Part II | Lor Sam Pau | Uncredited |
| 1987 | Return of the Demon | The Demon | |
| 1987 | Return of the Kickfighter | Bad Brother | |
| 1988 | Paper Marriage | Thug in white Suit | |
| 1988 | Shy Spirit | Lama | |
| 1988 | Dragons Forever | Thug Leader | |
| 1988 | Criminal Hunter | | |
| 1988 | Into the Night | | |
| 1988 | Walk on Fire | Wai | |
| 1988 | In the Line of Duty III | Diamonds' Fence | |
| 1988 | City Warriors | Lok Han | |
| 1989 | Bloody Brotherhood | Fat Hoi's Vietnamese henchman and hitman | |
| 1989 | Pedicab Driver | Wai | |
| 1989 | Proud and Confident | Popeye | |
| 1989 | Final Run | Bull | |
| 1989 | Close Escape | Chiu Ying-Kau | |
| 1989 | Dragon Fight | Wong Wai | Action director |
| 1989 | Underground Warfare | | |
| 1989 | Who Cares | Yeung Wai | |
| 1989 | Angel Enforcers | Ah-Wai | |
| 1989 | Angel's Mission | Jerry | |
| 1990 | Never Say Regret | Hsiung | |
| 1990 | Family Honor | Wai | |
| 1990 | No Way Back | Koeng | |
| 1990 | Fortune Chasers | Gang Boss | |
| 1990 | Bullet for Hire | Dick | |
| 1990 | Yellow Rain | Brother Ho | |
| 1990 | The Wolf of Revenge | | |
| 1991 | Retreat Of The Godfather | | |
| 1991 | Godfather's Daughter Mafia Blues | Tung | |
| 1991 | Stone Age Warriors | First Guide | |
| 1991 | Visa to Hell | Black Panther | Director, action director |
| 1991 | The Vengeance | | |
| 1991 | Ghost's Love | | |
| 1991 | Kung-Fu Kid | | |
| 1991 | The Drug Hunt | Police Chief | TV film |
| 1992 | Come From China | Tank | |
| 1992 | My Pretty Companion | | |
| 1992 | Angel Terminators | Sama | |
| 1992 | Midnight Lover | | |
| 1992 | Megaforce From Highland | | |
| 1992 | Erotic China Dolls | | |
| 1992 | Queen Of Gambler | | |
| 1992 | A Dancing Boy in Underworld Street | | |
| 1992 | Lady Killer | | |
| 1992 | Behind the Curtain | | |
| 1992 | Wonderful Killer | | |
| 1992 | Desperate Duo | | |
| 1992 | Attention Lover | | |
| 1992 | The Last Thief of the Dynasty | Huh Lung | |
| 1993 | Erotic Journey | Big Brother Chung | |
| 1993 | Snake Fist | | TV film |
| 1993 | The Widow | | |
| 1993 | Police Women | Wong Yun Lung | |
| 1993 | Supercop 2 | Ah-Shuen | |
| 1993 | On Parole | Yin | |
| 1993 | Sexual Harasser | | |
| 1993 | Bloody Brothers | Chang Tung-Pin | |
| 1993 | The Case of the Spirit of Banana | Kao Tien-Yun | |
| 1994 | A Killing Order | Detective Yun Duan | Director, action director |
| 1994 | Two Gambling Men | | |
| 1994 | Guardian Angel | | |
| 1994 | Urban Cop | Law Kit | TV film |
| 1995 | Mr. X | | |
| 1995 | Inspector of King | | TV film |
| 1995 | Countryside Hero | | |
| 1995 | Xue Niang | Xia San Hu | TV series |
| 1995 | Series of Murder Files | | |
| 1995 | Ao Men Zhui Xiong | | |
| 1995 | The Righteous Guards | Duan Chang Hong | TV series |
| 1995 | The Righteous Guards II | Duan Chang Hong | TV series |
| 1996 | Horrible High Heels | Police Chief | |
| 1996 | Final Fugitive | | |
| 1996 | No.13 Command | Police Chief | TV film |
| 1997 | Iron Sister | Suen | |
| 1997 | Last Target To Kill | Police Chief | TV film |
| 1997 | Stay Behind the Yellow Line | Argentina | |
| 1997 | Crazy Mission | | |
| 1997 | The First Professional Killer | | |
| 1999 | To Nail the Killer with All Efforts | | TV film |
| 1999 | Stunt Couple | Hung Sing | TV film |
| 1999 | Sword Knight-errant | | |
| 1999 | The Wanted Convict | | |
| 1999 | Killer of Lover | | TV film |
| 1999 | The Good and the Bad | | TV film |
| 2000 | Crazy Badboy | Police Chief Lai | TV film |
| 2000 | Guard Soldier | Tang Po Shen | TV film |
| 2000 | The Died Body | | |
| 2001 | Kill the Unforgiven | | TV film |
| 2004 | Life Taken Call-In | Police Chief | TV film |
| 2013 | 7 Assassins | Adjutant | |
| 2014 | Long's Story | Ming | |
| 2016 | New Encounters of the Spooky Kind | Master Ti | Director, online film |
| 2017 | Fast Hands Hung Boxer | Huh Lung | Online film |
| 2017 | An Idiot Lost in Xiangxi | Kungfu King | |
| 2018 | The Angel Eyes | Village Leader | |
| 2018 | Return of Heroes | Duke Han | Online film |
| 2018 | Diexue Dadao Hui | | |
| 2018 | The Knight in the White Night | Zhu Gu Sheng | Online film |
| 2019 | Return of Heroes II | Duke Han | Online film |
| 2020 | Chinese People The Soul of Wushu | Lai Hoi Chun | Online film |
