= Gloria Yip =

Gloria Yip Wan-Yee
- Born: January 13, 1973 (age 53); British Hong Kong
- Education: Saint Ma Jiali Women's Academy; Causeway Bay School; Hong Kong Art School (Master's degree); RMIT University
- Occupations: Actor; singer; sculptor
- Years active: 1988–1995; 2001–present
- Spouse: 陳柏浩 (Chen Pak Ho) (m. 1995; div. 2000)
- Children: 2 (紹臻 (Siu Chun) and 紹珩 (Siu Han))
- Parent(s): Yip Siu, Yip Fu

Chinese name
- Traditional Chinese: 葉蘊儀
Transcriptions
Standard Mandarin
- Hanyu Pinyin: Yè Yìn-Yí
Yue: Cantonese
- Jyutping: Yihp Wán-Yìh
- Musical career
- Origin: Hong Kong
- Genres: Cantopop, Mandopop, J-pop
- Instrument: Vocals
- Label: Music Impact
- Website: abcde.com.hk/gloria/index.html

Gloria Yip Wan-Yee (Chinese: 葉蘊儀, born January 13, 1973) is a Hong Kong actress and singer, best known for her four films with director Lam Ngai Kai, and to Western audiences, her "special appearance" in Lam's Riki-Oh: The Story of Ricky and principal supporting role in the cult classic Saviour of the Soul. Among her more frequent collaborators are Yuen Biao, Lai Kai Ming, and Wong Jing. Her early roles were primarily cute and comedic, while her more recent, post-divorce roles, have primarily been dramatic.

She was born in Hong Kong, the elder of two sisters and daughter of prominent businessman Yip Shao, and was discovered as a teenager by a Japanese talent scout. Like many movie stars in Hong Kong, she has also pursued a career as a singer, touring in Japan, Hong Kong, Taiwan, and South Korea, and she has released more than half a dozen CDs.

In her homeland, she retains a reputation for wholesomeness, a childlike face described as "forever 19 years old," and the philandering of her husband, leading to a divorce in 2000, caused a media stir. While she was married, she went into semi-retirement, enjoyed being a mother, and pursued interests in arts and crafts, primarily embroidery and clay sculpture. She graduated from Hong Kong Art School in 2008.

She is fluent in Cantonese, Japanese, Mandarin, and English and is a fan of Jackie Chan (with whom she has worked), Tom Cruise, Rie Miyazawa, and Madonna. Her roles in Mark Six Comedy and Boxer's Story include brief passages of English dialogue.

== Discovery by talent scout ==
During secondary school at St. Margaret's Girls' College, she went to Japan, and was discovered by a talent scout. She was only thirteen (though she claimed at the time to be fourteen), took a Japanese name, and appeared in television commercials for McDonald's and TDK. Her career continued from there. In 1987, at age 14, she appeared in the play, 呷醋大丈夫 (The Real Man Sips the Vinegar or Goodbye Darling). At age 19, she appeared in another play, 洗腳水 (The Water for Foot Washing) (1992).

== Film career: first phase ==
She frequently appears in comedian supporting roles, such as Su Rongrong (known simply as "Ron" in the English subtitles), an acrobatic acupuncturist in The Legend of the Liquid Sword, or the just slightly-too-young bounty hunter Fung Ling ("Little Bewitchment") in Flying Dagger. Her most noted role is Ashura the Hell Virgin, a major supporting role in Peacock King, which is usually cited as her screen debut at age 15. This role is also quite comic and often slapstick. She plays a mischievous but essentially innocent offspring of devils. She possesses great power, but essentially as a vessel for others to wield, or for her to use when she is not really trying, and thus she is a source of great danger without any malice. In both films, her character is redeemed when she helps her friends Peacock King/Kujaku (Yuen Biao) and Lucky Fruit (played by different actors in the two films), who act as her guardians, destroy major demons. The role was more demanding in the second film, in which her childlike innocence and mischief is somewhat quelled by a mystical death sentence that attacks her like a disease.

Released half a year prior to Peacock King was the multi-award-winning comedy, Chicken and Duck Talk. Her role is limited to less than a minute of screen time, playing Judy, friend of Michael Hui's son. Judy is referred to several times, is glimpsed briefly in Danny's Chicken, and appears in the duck restaurant at the film's finale, and never speaks, though she is spoken to. In Demoness from Thousand Years, she appears only at the beginning and end of the film and is listed twelfth in the screen credits, though promotional materials, including the DVD cover, feature her prominently and give her second billing. Her character, Siu-Yi, carries the weight of a second lead in her included scenes as companion to Yun Yu-Yi (Joey Wang), but is unconscious throughout most of the film's narrative, being frozen in the pre-credits sequence and revived during the climax, communicating with Yu-Yi through a television set, and appearing as a doll vendor in the last scene. Prior to these roles, she appeared in the 22 October 1987 and 11 November 1997 episodes of the television series, 呷醋大丈夫/Xia cu da zhang fu/Goodbye Darling.

She often plays roles that are younger than she is in real life, abetted by the fact that she is just under 5'2". In Saviour of the Soul, she played Andy Lau's 12-year-old kid sister, Wai Heung, who is enamored with baseball, when she was eighteen.

Her other roles include the young bride, Belle Kao, in Jackie Chan's Miracles, in which much of the film's narrative is driven by her character's wedding; Gucci (a confident and witty bank robbery hostage) in The Blue Jean Monster, the mysterious Alien Girl in The Cat, Ann in Pink Bomb, and a cameo as Ricki's murdered girlfriend, Ying, in Riki-Oh: The Story of Ricky. Of all her films, Story of Ricky (as it was known in English in Hong Kong) has received the widest release in the United States, thanks to promotion by Comedy Central, although its Category III rating made it a minor film in Hong Kong.

== Marriage, retirement, arts and other activities ==
Her goal was to make a film that she herself would particularly like, and as such she is not particularly prolific as Hong Kong film actors go. She retired from the screen after appearing in the 1994 film, The Gods Must Be Crazy V: The Gods Must Be Funny in China, to marry toy businessman 陳柏浩 (Chen Pak Ho) on May 25, 1995, and the birth of a son, 陳紹臻 (Chen Siu Chun), followed in February, 1996. The couple had a daughter, 陳衍衍 (Chen Hin Hin), whose name translates "Spread Out," November 30, 1999. Her husband refused to pay alimony so she struggled financially to raise her two children. Reports revealed that, initially, she took up many behind-the-scenes production jobs because of her difficulty to obtain significant film roles.

Yip continued to appear on television to demonstrate her hobby of embroidery, and she also wrote a magazine column on arts and crafts. In 1997, she enrolled at Causeway Bay School to study clay sculpture. She graduated from Hong Kong Art School on January 27, 2008, with her porcelain thesis work, 戀物/Materialism (2007). Yip also completed a master's degree in fine arts at Australia's RMIT University in 2013. Her artworks, particularly her sculptures, have earned her awards. For instance, she was the only Hong Kong representative to qualify in the top thirty at the Arte Laguna Prize, an Italian competition for visual art pieces. She also has an art studio school, which she founded with close friends in Tsim Sha Tsui.

Yip is also a very vocal supporter of the Umbrella movement, which emerged during the Hong Kong democracy protests in 2014. She often used her social media presence to send strong messages of support to students who participated in the 79-day occupation of key areas of the Admiralty, Causeway Bay, and Mong Kok. Yip, herself, went to the Admiralty and Causeway Bay to tie yellow ribbons on street railings and signposts.

== Divorce and return to film ==
In January 2000, Yip and Chen were divorced at Chen's suggestion after he had an extramarital affair and was visiting brothels. She returned to the screen in 2001 with a cameo role in Heroes in Love after Chen failed to pay her allowances. Details of the affair were exposed to the media in 2002, including Yip publishing excerpts from her own diary concerning her feelings. After nearly a ten-year absence, Yip had the leading role in the horror film, Death Melody (2003), followed by another horror film, Double Face Girl. She also returned to stage plays.

During this later period, she has largely abandoned her comedic persona. In 2004, while Mark Six Comedy places her in a comic foil role as the manager (named Gloria) of an office of immature twentysomethings, deriving humor through being serious, in both Boxer's Story, a drama, and Osaka Wrestling Restaurant, a comedy, she plays serious roles as ex-wives of unsuccessful men, each with a son. In the latter film, she is not involved in any of the comic antics whatsoever, and structurally, her role, a "special appearance" with only four scenes, is designed to give the film an emotional core it might otherwise lack. In the former film, she plays the ex-wife of a character played by Yuen, and much of the film is about regaining her son now that she is married to a cardiologist and has a successful career of her own in automotive sales, primarily to English-speaking clients. In Breezy Summer, her role, again eponymous, is a tragic performance.

Later that year, she was reunited with Story of Ricky star Fan Siu Wong and The Cat star Christine Ng in the television miniseries, Magic Sword of Heaven and Earth, as the goddess Guanyin, which aired in 2005. This role, again serious, is a figure of divine intervention at the second act turning point, and a brief visit in the film's finale. Most of these were low budget productions shot on digital video rather than on film.

In 2007, she appeared in Magic Boy.

When she appeared in 2013 to promote 2014 TVB series, Never Dance Alone, the media was shocked at changes in her weight, her grey hair, and overall matronly look, describing her as "a replica of a gray-haired Lan Jieying". (Lan is six years Yip's senior.) Friends described her as unrecognizable, fat, and foregrounded their fear of marrying the wrong person.

== Music ==
The musicians who perform with Gloria Yip on her albums include Ricky Ho, Belinda Foo, Iskandar Ismail (keyboards), Eddie Marzuki, Jonathan Koh, Shah Tahir (guitars), Stephen Rufus (saxophone), Larry Lai (flute), and Jimmy Lee (cymbals). The songs are composed by many different people, as are the lyrics, though Yip sometimes writes her own lyrics, such as for "請你等等" ("Invites You and So On...").

Japan

- ASHURA (February 1990 /Singles)
- S.O.S. (October 1990 /Singles)
- 原宿 Harajuku (December 1990 /Album)
- 砂に消えた涙 Tears disappear in the sand (July 1991 /Singles)
- クリスマス Christmas (November 1991 /Album)
- 眠り姫 Sleeping Beauty (January 1992 /Singles)
- 眠り姫 Sleeping Beauty (November 1993 /Album)

South Korea

- SEOUL (August 1991 /Album)
- My X-Mas... (November 1995 /Album)

Taiwan

- 欺騙你的心 Cheat Your Heart (March 1992 /Album) lyrics
- 愛的故事 Love Story (September 1992 /Album)lyrics
- 真的愛我就不要讓我傷心 Really Likes Me not Likely to Make Me Sad (April 1993 /Album) lyrics
- 諾言 Promise (December 1993 /Album) lyrics
- 是你答應說要對我好 Were You Insisting That Must Be Good for Me (June 1994 /Album) lyrics
- 把我放在心裡頭 Places in My Heart (November 1994 /Album) lyrics
- 在自己的房間裡 In own room (January 1995 /Album)lyrics

Hong Kong

- 可否想起我 Can think of me (October 1993 /Album)

== Filmography ==
(in order of earliest release (when dates are available))

The official English titles of the first three and are essentially literal translations. Otherwise, translations are provided when available.

- 呷醋大丈夫/Xia cu da zhang fu/Goodbye Darling (10/22-11/4, 1987 TV episodes)
- 雞同鴨講 Gai tung aap gong/Chicken and Duck Talk (7/1988) ... Judy
- 孔雀王子 Hung cheuk wong ji/Peacock King (12/1988) ... Ashura
- 奇蹟 Ji Ji/Miracles (6/1989) ... Belle Kao
- 阿修羅 A Xiu-lo (Ashura)/Saga of the Phoenix (2/1990) ... Ashura
- 香港パラダイス/Hong Kong Paradise (4/1990) ... Chin's Assistant
- 祝福 Zhu Fu (Blessing)/Promising Miss Bowie (6/1990) ... Pinky (Bowie's niece)
- 千年女妖 Chin nin lui yiu (Millennium Banshee)/Demoness from Thousand Years (9/1990) ... Siu-Yi
- 力王 Lik wong (Strength King)/Riki-Oh: The Story of Ricky (4/1991) ... Ying (Ricky's girlfriend)
- 著牛仔褲的鍾馗 Jeuk ngau jai foo dik Jung Kwai (Jeans of Jung Kwai)/The Blue Jean Monster (5/1991) ... Gucci
- 豪門夜宴 Haomen yeyan (Rich and Powerful Family Evening Banquet)/The Banquet (11/1991) ... Party Guest
- 九一神鵰俠侶 Gau yat: San diu hap lui ('91 God Eagle Hero Couple)/Saviour of the Soul (12/1991) ... Wai Heung (Benefit Fragrance)
- 新孖寶妙探 Jeung Bo Miu Taam (New Valuable Twin Searches Marvelously)/The New Marvelous Double (9/1992)
- 衛斯理之老貓 Wai Si Li zhi Lao Mao (Wisely's Old Cat)/Wisely in The Cat (10/1992) ... Alien Girl
- 愛情戀曲 Oicing lyun kuk (Sentimental Love Tune)/The Modern Love Story (11/1992) (TV series)
- 霧都情仇 Wu du qing chou (Fog Rival in Love)/Misty (11/1992)
- 笑俠楚留香 Siu hap Cho Lau Heung (Smiling Hero Cho Lau Heung)/The Legend of the Liquid Sword (3/1993) ... Su Rongrong "Ron"
- 人生得意衰盡歡 Ren sheng de yi shuai jin huan (The Life Is Self-Satisfying, Fading, Having a Good Time)/Pink Bomb (3/1993) ... Ann
- 神經刀與飛天貓 Shen Jing Dao yu Fei Tian Mao (Nerve Knife and Flying Cat Apsara)/Flying Dagger (5/1993) ... Fung Ling (Little Bewitchment)
- Democrats (1993) (TV series)
- 目連救母 Muk lin gau mou (Mulian Saves Mother) (1993)
- 開心華之裡 Hoisam waa zi leoi (Happy in China)/Mind Our Own Business (1993) (TV series)
- 非洲超人 Fei zhou chao ren (Africa Exceeds Others in Ability/African Superman)/The Gods Must Be Crazy V: The Gods Must Be Funny in China (3/1994)
- 路長情更長/Journey to Happiness (4/1994) TV series
- 包青天I Bao Qing Tian/Justice Pao episode "Nanakogo Kyouka" (5/1995) (TV series)
- 戀愛起義 Lian'ai qiyi (Love Revolt)/Heroes in Love (4/2001)
- 星光伴我行 Singwong bun ngo hang (The Star Light Accompanies My Line)/Starry Journey (2001) TV episode .... Documentary; Gloria Yip explores Thailand
- 雪地裡的星星 Syut dei leoi dik singsing (Stars in Snowy Area)/Starry Starry Night... (2001) (TV series) ... Oncologist
- 愛情白皮書寫真樂譜集 Oicing baakpeisyu sezan ngokpou zaap (Love White Paper Portrait Music Collection)/Tomorrow Photo Album (8/2002) (TV series)
- 連鎖奇幻檔案之死亡音樂 Linso keiwaan dongon zi seimon jamngok (Chain-Like Wonderful Imaginary Files of Killer Sheet Music)/Death Melody (2003) ... Xiao Xue
- 傷生兒 Soeng saang ji (Is Injurious to Life)/Double Face Girl (2003) ... Tung
- 多重彩 Docung coi (Multi-Color)/Mark Six Comedy (2003) ... Gloria
- 賊盗将軍 Zeidao Jiangjun/Thieves Steal the Generals (2004) (TV Series)
- 赤子拳王 Chek ji kuen wong (Pure Boxing Champion)/Boxer's Story (2004) ... Susan
- 夏之春 Haa zi (Spring of the Summer)/Breezy Summer (2004) ... Gloria
- 大阪撻一餐 Daai Baan Taat Yat Chaan (Osaka Flogs One Meal)/Osaka Wrestling Restaurant (5/2004) ... Maye
- 天地神劍 Tian di shen jian (World God Sword)/Magic Sword of Heaven and Earth (2005) (TV) ... Goddess Guanyin (Episodes VII, VIII, X)
- 魔術男 Moseot naam (Magic Boy)/Magic Boy (2007)
- 狂舞派 Kwong mou paai (Wild Dance Clique)/The Way We Dance (2013) ... Mrs. Lam
- 女人俱樂部 Neoijan keoilokbu (Women's Club)/Never Dance Alone (2014)
- 正義迴廊 Jing yi wui long (Justice Corridor)/The Sparring Partner (2022)
