= Shah Tahir =

Nizari Ismaili Shia Imam (1486–1549)

Shah Tahir al-Husayni al-Dakkani

31st Imam of the Muhammad-Shahi (Mu'mini) Nizari Ismaili Shias
- Tenure: 1510-1549
- Predecessor: Radi al-Din II ibn Tahir
- Successor: Haydar ibn Tahir
- Born: 892 AH/1486 AD; Khund, near Qasvin, Iran
- Died: 956 AH/1549 AD; Ahmednagar, Ahmadnagar Sultanate (modern-day Maharashtra, India)
- Burial: Karbala, present-day Iraq

Shah Tahir, also known as Tahir Shah, (Arabic: شاه طاهر الحسيني الدكني, romanized: Shāh Tāhir al-Husayni al-Dakkani; 1486 – 1549) and known in his lifetime by his followers as Hujjatullah was a Nizari Ismaili Imam from the Muhammad-Shahi (Mu'mini) line and an astronomer and philosopher who served as a minister of the Nizam Shahi dynasty in South India.

== Early life ==
Imam Shah Tahir was born in Khund, a village in Gilan near the border with Qazvin, that has since been abandoned. He was the son of Imam Shah Radi ad-Din II, a descendant of the Nizaris of Alamut who claimed descent from the Fatimids of Egypt and a Nizari Ismaili Imam. During his youth, he spent time studying and teaching in Kashan. After the establishment of Safavid dynasty and its surge against mysticism, he gave up Isma'ili mysticism and joined Shah Ismail's court in early 1520 AD, but he had to leave Iran after Shah Ismail grew suspicious, making his way to India. He was a student of the great 16th century astronomer, Shams al-Din al-Khafri.

== Life and career ==
Imam Shah Tahir arrived in Goa in mid-1520, but was ignored by the Adil Shahi monarch. He left Bijapur and moved to Parenda, where he started teaching almagest, a treatise by Ptolemy on astronomy. In 1522 AD, on request of Sultan Burhan Nizam Shah, he joined the court of Ahmadnagar. He also acted as chief diplomat, and would deliver lectures twice a week in the fort. Eventually, in 1538 AD, he persuaded the Sunni sultan to convert to Nizari Shi'ism, of which he was imam of the largest branch at that time. The sultan would also declare Nizarism the official state religion.

He wrote many books, among them were:

1. A commentary on the Almagest
2. A commentary on theology of Avicenna
3. Sharh bāb hādi 'ashr on theology
4. Sharh ja'fariyya on jurisprudence
5. A commentary on tafsīr bayzawi

== Death ==
He died in 1549 AD and his body was sent to Karbala to be buried near the tomb of Husayn ibn Ali. He had four sons and three daughters, among whom Imam Shah Haydar succeeded him as Imam and a minister in the court.

Shia Islam titles
Preceded by Radi al-Din II ibn Tahir	31st Imam of Muhammad-Shahi (Mu'mini) Nizari Isma'ilism; 1510–1549	Succeeded by Haydar ibn Tahir
