= Rachel Lee (actress) =

Hong Kong actress

- 李麗珍
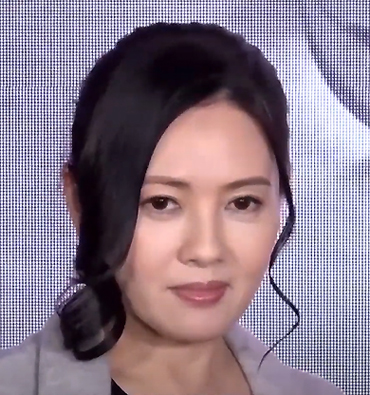
- Lee attending the press conference for the ViuTV reality show Divorce Tour (一切從失婚開始) in December 2019.
- Years active: 1983–present
- Spouse: Clarence Hui Yuen (m. 1996; div. 2000)
- Partner(s): Patrick Lee; Lam Lei; David Ki Man-kit; Patrick Lui Yau-fai; Chin Ka-lok; Jacky Ma; Calvin Poon Yuen-leung
- Children: Annise Hui Yi-yung (b.1997)
- Awards: Golden Bauhinia Awards – Best Actress; 2000 Ordinary Heroes Golden Horse Awards – Best Actress; 1999 Ordinary Heroes

Chinese name
- Traditional Chinese: 李麗珍
- Simplified Chinese: 李丽珍
Transcriptions
Yue: Cantonese
- Jyutping: lei5 lai6 zan1
- Musical career
- Also known as: Rachel Lee 李孋珍 (Lee Lai-Chun)

Rachel Lee Lai-chun (Chinese: 李麗珍; Jyutping: lei5 lai6 zan1), originally known as Loletta Lee Lai-chun, is a Hong Kong actress.

== Early life and education ==
Lee lived in Quarry Bay in her early years. When Lee was in primary school, she moved to Tai Hang. She originally attended a primary school in Happy Valley, but because she suffered from motion sickness when riding the Hong Kong Tram, she transferred to a primary school near her home to complete her studies.

== Career ==
Lee started playing small roles in Hong Kong movies in the 1980s. Her first role as a lead actress was in Devoted to You. After secondary school, she continued to play young teenagers in the 1980s until 1990. In the early 90s, she participated in erotic films such as Crazy Love, The Spirit of Love, Girls Unbutton and Sex and Zen 2. She continues to work in Hong Kong cinema. Her performance in Ordinary Heroes earned her a Golden Horse Award in 1999 for Best Actress.

In early 2000, Lee challenged herself by performing in the stage play "New Tales of Liaozhai," a genre she had never attempted before.

In 2013, she once again filmed a drama for TVB, starring in the major annual drama "Never Dance Alone", co-produced by Eric Tsang and Joe Chan Wai-koon, playing the role of Julie. She collaborated with former goddesses Carman Lee, Fennie Yuen, Flora Chan, Gloria Yip, Angie Cheong, and Elvina Kong. The drama premiered on April 21, 2014.

== Personal life ==
In 1996, she married Hong Kong music composer Clarence Hui Yuen, a union dubbed "Beauty and the Beast" by the media. The following year, they had a daughter, Annise Hui Yi-yung. In 2000, Lee and Hui divorced, with Lee gaining custody of their daughter.

== Filmography ==
- Crazy Love (1993)
- The Greed of Man (大時代, 1992, TVB series)

== Discography ==
- Innocence 純真 (1994) (97129-2 MIM-9416C) with Ricky Ho, Belinda Foo, Iskandar Ismail (keyboards), Eddie Marzuki, Jonathan Koh, Shah Tahir (guitars), Stephen Rufus (saxophone), Larry Lai (flute), and Jimmy Lee (cymbals).
