= Nina Li Chi =

Hong Kong actress (born 1961)

Nina Li
- 利智
- Born: December 31, 1961 (age 64); Shanghai, China
- Other names: Li Chi; Li Zhi
- Education: University of San Francisco
- Occupation: Actress
- Years active: 1986–1992
- Known for: Miss Asia Pacific Hong Kong 1986
- Height: 1.65 m (5 ft 5 in)
- Spouse: Jet Li (m. 1999)
- Children: 2 daughters

Chinese name
- Chinese: 利智
Transcriptions
Standard Mandarin
- Hanyu Pinyin: Lì Zhì
- Wade–Giles: Li^{4} Chih^{4}
Yue: Cantonese
- Yale Romanization: Leih Ji
- Jyutping: Lei6 Zi3

Nina Li Chi (born December 31, 1961) is a retired Hong Kong actress. She is also known by her Chinese name Li Chi or Li Zhi (Chinese: 利智). She is best known for being the wife of famous martial artist and actor Jet Li.

== Early life ==
Li was born on December 31, 1961, in Shanghai, China. Her father was a stage actor.

== Career ==
In 1986, Li was the winner of Miss Asia Pacific Hong Kong. On September 30, 1986, Li was a beauty pageant participant in Miss Asia Pacific Quest 1986 and was placed as third runner up.

In 1986, Li's film career began in Hong Kong with the film The Seventh Curse.

== Personal life ==
On September 19, 1999, Lì married Jet Li, her co-star from the 1989 film Dragon Fight. They have two daughters, Jane Li (b. 2000) and Jada Li (b. 2002).

== Filmography ==
=== Films ===
Year	English title	Role	Notes/Ref.
1982	Zhui nu san shi liu fang	Man-Jun's maid	
1986	The Seventh Curse	Girl drinking champagne	Uncredited
1987	Amnesty Decree	Ah Kim	
1987	Seven Years Itch	Lam Siu Hung	
1987	The Beauty Diu Sim	Diao Chan	TV series
1988	Tiger on the Beat	Marydonna	
1988	Guests in the House	Ho Fei Fung	
1988	Profile of Pleasure	Yim Hung	
1988	Mr. Mistress	Ho's wife	
1988	Criminal Hunter	Mimi	
1988	Fractured Follies	Scarlet	
1988	The Greatest Lover	Lychee	
1989	Aces Go Places 5: The Terracotta Hit	Sister Thief	
1989	Pedicab Driver	Ping	
1989	Four Loves	Chin Pui Ling	
1989	Dragon Fight	Penny	
1989	What a Small World	Nina Lee	
1989	Celebrity Talk Show	Guest	TV series
1990	The Fun, the Luck & the Tycoon	Cindy Chan	
1990	The Spooky Family	Colleague Sister	
1990	To Spy with Love	Li Chi	
1990	Perfect Girls	Feng Mu-Jen	
1990	The Dragon from Russia	Chime	
1991	The Gambling Ghost	Lily	
1991	Stone Age Warriors	Lucy Wong	
1991	A Chinese Ghost Story Part III	Butterfly	
1991	Inspector Pink Dragon	Tam Lan Hing	
1991	Legend of the Brothers	Movie Star	
1991	A Kid from Tibet	Sorcerer's Sister	
1992	Twin Dragons	Tammy	
1992	Miracle 90 Days	Manager of the Ocean Park	
1992	Lover's Tear	Fang Yi Ling, a deaf woman	(final film role)

== See also ==
- Miss Asia Pageant#Miss Asia Pacific
