= Chua Lam =

Singaporean-Hong Kong columnist, food critic and television host (1941–2025)

- 蔡瀾
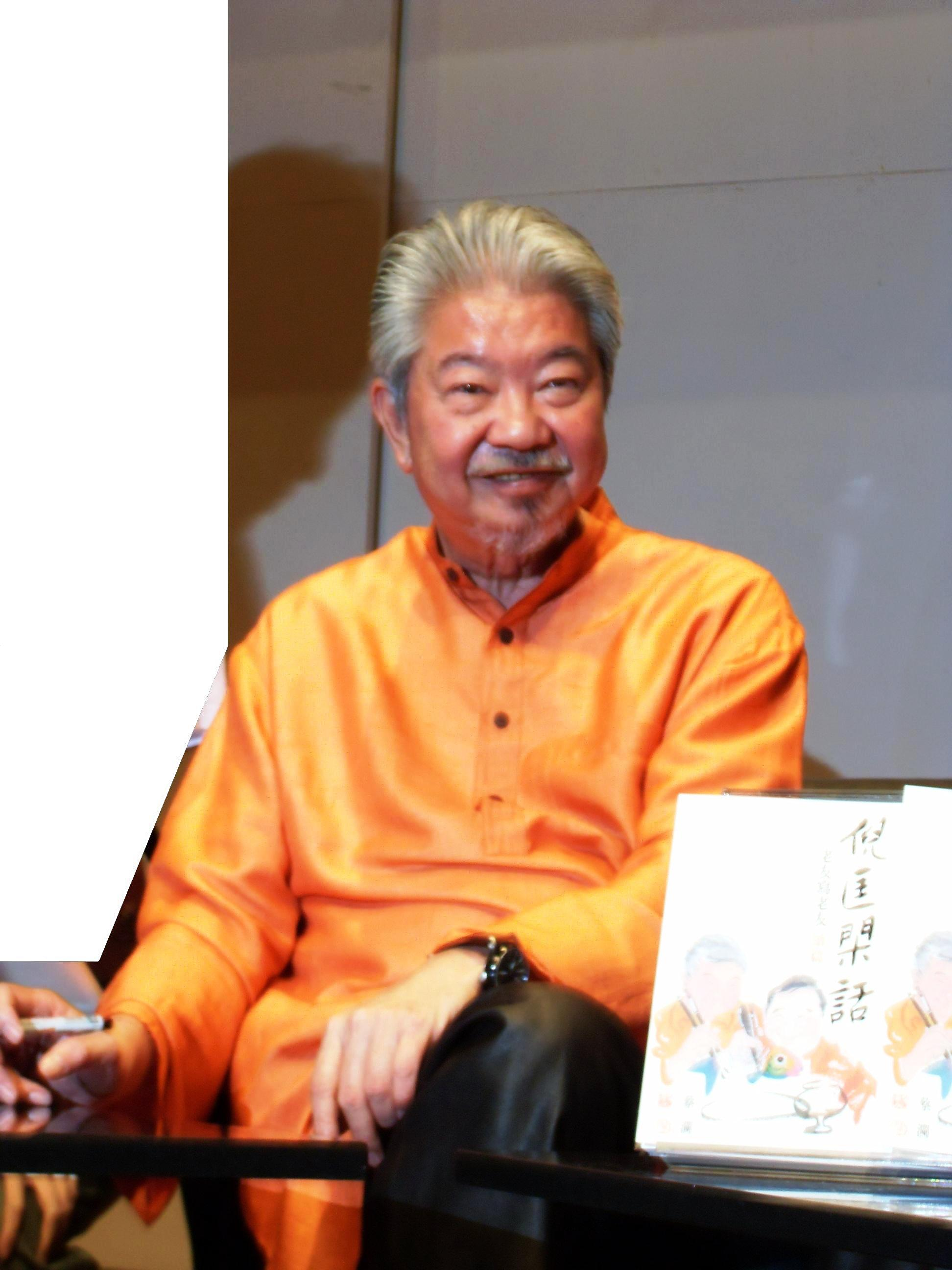
- Chua in 2008
- Born: 18 August 1941; Singapore, Straits Settlements, British Malaya
- Died: 25 June 2025 (aged 83); Hong Kong Sanatorium and Hospital, Happy Valley, Hong Kong
- Resting place: Nam Ann Siang Theon Temple, Hougang, Singapore
- Occupations: Columnist, food connoisseur, film producer, television presenter
- Spouse: Chang Chong-wen (張瓊文)
- Children: Nil
- Parent(s): Chua Boon-suan (1907 - 1995); Hung Fong-ping (1909 - 2008)

Chinese name
- Traditional Chinese: 蔡瀾
- Simplified Chinese: 蔡澜
Transcriptions
Standard Mandarin
- Hanyu Pinyin: cài lán
Yue: Cantonese
- Jyutping: coi3 laan4

Chua Lam (simplified Chinese: 蔡澜; traditional Chinese: 蔡瀾, 18 August 1941 – 25 June 2025) was a Hong Kong columnist, food critic and occasional television host. He was also a film producer for the Hong Kong film studio Golden Harvest.

Chua Lam has built a reputation in the cultural world, with ties to esteemed individuals like Jin Yong, Ni Kuang, and James Wong Jim, who are collectively considered the "Four Great Talents of Hong Kong". From 1989 to 1990, he co-hosted Asia Television's classic adult talk show "Celebrity Talk Show" with the latter two. The show was widely popular with audiences and earned the media accolades as one of "Hong Kong's Three Great Mouths."

== Early life ==
Chua was born in Singapore in 1941. His father originally named him 蔡南 (Teochew: Chùa Lâm; Pinyin: Cài Nán), meaning born in Nanyang (南洋). But when the name was sent back to the ancestral hall in the Teochew hometown, it was discovered that someone in the previous two generations already had the same name, so it could not be used. However, his birth certificate had already been registered as "Chua Lam", so his Chinese name was eventually changed.

Chua, had an elder sister and brother and one younger brother.

As a child, Chua lived above a cinema, always in sight of the screen, and his passion for movies grew. Influenced by his father, he read extensively, publishing his first article in the Nanyang Siang Pau at the age of 14. Because he disliked studying, he attended several primary schools. For secondary school, he attended The Chinese High School in Bukit Timah, Singapore, studying Chinese in the mornings and English in the afternoons at another school. Chua originally hoped to study painting in France, but at 18 decided to study abroad in Japan.

Chua attended Nihon University in Chiyoda, Tokyo, Japan and enrolled in the Department of Film Directing of the College of Art. While studying, Chua worked part-time for Shaw Brothers Studio as a manager and translator in Japan.

== Career ==
=== Media career ===
In 1963, Chua moved to Hong Kong and continued to work at Shaw Brothers as its production manager. After working at the studio for 20 years, Chua was approached by Hong Kong producer Raymond Chow, who had just founded the film studio Golden Harvest, to serve as the vice-president of film production which he accepted. While at Golden Harvest, Chua produced numerous films, including several films such as Armour Of God (1987), City Hunter (1993), Thunderbolt (1995) and Mr. Nice Guy (1997), for Jackie Chan.

Beside producing films, Chua also hosted several food programmes such as Market Trotter (2007), Chua's Choice (2008) and Be My Guest (2009).

Chua was primarily known in Japan as a judge on the Fuji TV series Iron Chef.

=== Writing career ===
Chua was a columnist on Oriental Daily and Ming Pao in Hong Kong. Chua later switched to writing columns for the Next Media's publications, namely Next Magazine (on movies and a restaurant guide), Apple Daily and Eat and Travel Weekly.

Chua wrote a number of books and restaurant guides on Hong Kong in Japanese.

From 2013 to 2024, Malaysian travel agency Apple Vacations organised a total of six tours with Chua in Asia to taste the local food and experience the local hospitality. Chua often wrote, in his newspaper columns, about the tours' organizing trips where he and others sample food from four or five restaurants per day in order to select the best restaurants.

Chua has authored more than 150 books on topics such as travel, personalities, food, humour, and his philosophy of life.

In September 2023, Chua collaborated with Sin Chew Daily for a calligraphy exhibition where his calligraphy was exhibited and sold. Chua decided to sell his collection after his wife's death as not to be too burdened with his collection. Proceeds from the sale went to charity.

=== Business career ===
Chua had also opened restaurants, such as Chua Lam's Pho, his first restaurant serving Vietnamese pho.

== Gastronomic philosophy ==
One of Chua's most beloved dishes was stir-fried bean sprout with fried tofu and fish sauce.

Chua was famous for advocating the use of pork drippings in food preparation and as a condiment. He cited and promoted the usage of pork fat in most of his TV shows.

In 2019, Chua criticised hotpot, describing it as a cooking method "totally lacking in cultural significance", and liked it to go extinct. Chua, in his writings, later clarified that while he is not interested in hotpot, he is not against hotpot but against poorly done hotpot using dipping sauces to attract customers. He especially appreciates Sichuan's hotpot.

In 2022, he also criticised omakase, a Japanese restaurant order where the choice of food is up to the chef, citing that the order only helped the restaurant and would not show the essence of Japanese cuisine.

== Personal life and death ==
Chua's father, Chua Boon-hean (蔡文玄), was a native of the Jio Mung Chua (蔡門石) village in Chaozhou who immigrated to Singapore. His father worked in a high-ranking post at the Shaw Brothers Studio and died in 1995.

Although Chua was based in Hong Kong from 1963, he held Singapore citizenship.

In March 2023, Chua's wife slipped and fell at home and died shortly after. While rushing over to his wife when she fell, Chua fell also and fractured his pelvic bone.

On 25 June 2025, Chua Lam died at Hong Kong Sanatorium & Hospital. He was 83, and later cremated. It was initially reported on Chua's Facebook page on 27 June 2025.

== Filmography ==
=== Film ===
Chua Lam worked in the 1980s and up to the end of the 1990s in the Hongkong film business as executive producer or producer.

| Year | Title |
|---|---|
| 1985 | Heart of Dragon |
| 1986 | Dr. Yuen and Wisely |
| 1987 | Armour of God |
| 1987 | Born to Gamble |
| 1987 | Killer's Nocturne |
| 1987 | Erotic Ghost Story |
| 1988 | Profiles of Pleasure |
| 1988 | Peacock King |
| 1989 | Four Loves |
| 1990 | A Sau-loh |
| 1991 | Robotrix |
| 1991 | Erotic Ghost Story II |
| 1991 | Au revoir, mon amour |
| 1991 | Riki-Oh: The Story of Ricky |
| 1992 | Erotic Ghost Story III |
| 1992 | The Cat |
| 1993 | City Hunter |
| 1993 | Crime Story |
| 1994 | Girls Unbutton |
| 1994 | Chinese Torture Chamber |
| 1994 | Spirit of Love |
| 1995 | Trilogy of Love |
| 1995 | Thunderbolt |
| 1995 | The Christ Of Nanjing |
| 1996 | The Imp |
| 1997 | Mr. Nice Guy |
| 1998 | Extreme Crisis |

=== Television ===
In the 2000s and 2010s he was working as general consultant and TV presenter for Japanese and other TV series as he had become "one of the most authoritative voices on Chinese cuisine".

- 2007: Market Trotter
- 2007: Ten Years After
- 2008: Chua's Choice
- 2009: Be My Guest
