= The Legend of Wisely =

1987 Hong Kong film by Teddy Robin

- Film poster
- Traditional Chinese: 衛斯理傳奇
- Simplified Chinese: 卫斯理传奇
- Hanyu Pinyin: Wèi Sī Lǐ Chuán Qí
- Jyutping: Wai6 Si1 Lei5 Zyun6 Kei4
- Directed by: Teddy Robin
- Screenplay by: Philip Cheng; Gerald Liu; Calvin Poon
- Based on: Wisely Series by Ni Kuang
- Produced by: Samuel Hui
- Starring: Samuel Hui; Ti Lung; Teddy Robin; Joey Wong
- Cinematography: Peter Pau
- Edited by: Cinema City Production Editing Unit
- Music by: Lo Tayu
- Production company: Cinema City
- Distributed by: Golden Princess Film Production
- Release date: 21 January 1987
- Running time: 86 minutes
- Country: Hong Kong
- Language: Cantonese
- Box office: HK$18,712,571

The Legend of Wisely (Chinese: 衛斯理傳奇 or 衞斯理傳奇; released in the Philippines as Fighters of the Empire) is a 1987 Hong Kong fantasy adventure film directed by Teddy Robin based on Ni Kuang's novel series, Wisely Series, starring Samuel Hui as the titular protagonist. The film co-stars Ti Lung, Joey Wong and Robin.

== Plot ==
Decades ago, an alien (later Howard Hope) crash-landed on Earth, losing his ship's master key. Monks in Nepal found the key, revering it as the sacred "Dragon Pearl." Howard integrated into human society, becoming wealthy while searching for his key to return home. Kei-Wei Pak also seeks the pearl for his late father; Kei-Wei hired David Ko to find it, and David recommended his friend Wisely for help. After failing to buy the pearl from a fake seller in Egypt, Howard seeks out Wisely to help locate David Ko. Wisely is drawn in when David contacts him to meet in Nepal.

In Nepal, David executes a plan using Wisely. He fakes his kidnapping to manipulate Wisely into distracting the monks at their monastery while David steals the pearl (the key). They escaped by plane, but the key's energy disables it. Wisely survives the crash; David is presumed dead but survives. Wisely is confronted by the monastery's telepathic young leader, who confirms David survived with the pearl and that Wisely was manipulated. Troubled, Wisely agrees to help the monks recover their sacred object.

Returning to Hong Kong, Howard's assistant tries to recruit Wisely to their side, but he can't be bought and left. Wisely goes to Kei-Wei's home in an attempt to recover the pearl. During the visit, he meets Kei-Wei's beautiful sister, Sue Pak (a fan of Wisely's books). Kei-Wei thought Wisely was here to receive the reward for his efforts, but he doesn't want the money and wants the pearl back. Kei-Wei becomes hostile and sends him away.

Later, Wisely secretly infiltrated Kei-Wei's home and spoke with Sue Pak about the pearl. Convinced her brother is wrong, Sue agrees to help Wisely. She leads him to the lab, where they find David and the pearl. Terrified of Kei-Wei, David pleads with Wisely to take him along. The trio secures the pearl and escapes the compound, Wisely using Sue as a brief hostage against the guards. However, moments after leaving, they are intercepted by Howard Hope's henchmen after a fierce car chase. David and the pearl are captured and taken away, presumably to Egypt.

In Egypt, Wisely and Sue tracked down David and Howard's forces. While investigating the situation, they were exposed and armed men attacked them. Kei-Wei arrives and fights off the attackers to protect Sue. Wisely tries to escape during the battle, but Kei-Wei catches up with him to fight. Kei-Wei got stuck in quicksand, and Wisely pulled him out to safety before getting trapped. Both siblings believed Wisely had died, and Sue wanted to honor his memory by completing his mission. Moved by Wisely's sacrifice, Kei-Wei joins Sue to stop Howard. Wisely survived the fall, falling into a cavern and digging his way back out. When the Pak Siblings found the little monk still waiting in Wisely's room, the monk saw his monastery destroyed and ran to see his brothers. The duo tried to go after the little monk but was stopped by his protectors. Wisely makes his return when he enters his lodging, and the three are reunited and go after the little monk. The trio returns to the Nepal monastery to find the monks massacred by Howard's incendiary powers. Because David never interfered with Howard, he was spared. The trio found David, and he explained that the pearl is an advanced computer that can interface with young human minds.

Wisely's team finds Howard and warns he'll kill anyone who gets in his way. The group insists that Howard return the pearl to the monks, but Howard clarified that the pearl is a solar pilot device that will reactivate his ship; the trio realizes Howard is not human. The little monk manages to get the pearl back, but Howard gives chase. In the final clash on a glacier, the key is on top of unstable ice. Howard falls onto his ship's spire trying to retrieve it. Fatally wounded, he is helped by his assistant to activate the ship using the key. The little monk realizes their beliefs about the pearl are wrong and no longer wants it. As the ship launches, Wisely and his friends escape the collapsing cavern. As the ship emerges from the mountain, it creates a massive cloud to cover itself as it prepares to exit Earth. As Wisely and his friends watch above, the ship takes a shadowy resemblance of the legendary Chinese Dragon and leaves the planet, understanding the alien truth behind the legend.

== Cast ==
- Samuel Hui as Wisely
- Ti Lung as Pak Kei-wai
- Teddy Robin as David Ko
- Joey Wong as Sue Pak
- Alan Ko as Little Master
- Bruce Baron as Howard Hope
- Heidi Makinen as Hope's assistant
- Blackie Ko as The Two Headed Snake
- Lee Hoi-hing as Hing
- Paulo Tocha
- Wellington Fung as Fake David Ko
- Kim Fan as the Little Master's guardian
- Ng Chiu-leung
- Lee Tak-shing
- Chen Chun-kun
- Chang Sing-kwong
- Eva Cobo

== Also known as ==
- Legend of Wisely
- Legend of Wu
- Wai Si-Lei chuen kei
- La Légende de la perle d'or
- The Legend of the Golden Pearl (UK title, 1987)
- Legenda o zlaté perle
- Wei si li chuan ji (China: Mandarin title)
- Wisely Legend (literal English title)

== Release ==
The Legend of Wisely was released in Hong Kong on 21 January 1987. In the Philippines, the film was released by Pioneer Releasing as Fighters of the Empire on 9 March 1988.

== See also ==
- Wisely Series, the novel series by Ni Kuang
- Films and television series adapted from the Wisely Series:
  - The Seventh Curse, a 1986 Hong Kong film starring Chow Yun-fat as Wisely
  - The Cat (1992 film), a 1998 Hong Kong film starring Waise Lee as Wisely
  - The New Adventures of Wisely, a 1998 Singaporean television series starring Michael Tao as Wisely
  - The Wesley's Mysterious File, a 2002 Hong Kong film starring Andy Lau as Wisely
  - The 'W' Files, a 2003 Hong Kong television series starring Gallen Lo as Wisely
