= The New Adventures of Wisely =

Television series

- Poster
- Traditional Chinese: 衛斯理傳奇
- Simplified Chinese: 卫斯理传奇
- Hanyu Pinyin: Wèisīlǐ Chuánqí
- Genre: Adventure fiction, science fiction
- Based on: Wisely Series by Ni Kuang
- Screenplay by: Ho Hee An
- Directed by: Daisy Chan
- Starring: Michael Tao; Li Nanxing; Zoe Tay
- Theme music composer: Kevin Q Ken Lim; Su Zhicheng
- Opening theme: Liuzhu Meiyitian (留住每一天) performed by Li Nanxing
- Ending theme: Danyuan (但愿) performed by Phyllis Quek; Meiyou Jiyi (没有记忆) performed by Jerry Chang
- Country of origin: Singapore
- Original language: Mandarin
- No. of episodes: 30

Production
- Producers: Daisy Chan; Victor Lau
- Production locations: Singapore; Egypt
- Editor: Xu Jiayan
- Running time: 46 minutes per episode
- Production company: TCS

Original release
- Network: TCS Eighth Frequency

Related
- The 'W' Files (2003)

The New Adventures of Wisely is a Singaporean adventure-science fiction television series adapted from the novel series Wisely Series by Ni Kuang. It was directed by Daisy Chan and starred Hong Kong actor Michael Tao as Wisely (or Wei Si Li), the main character. The series was first aired on Television Corporation of Singapore Channel 8 (now MediaCorp Channel 8) in Singapore in 1998.

== Plot ==
The 30 episodes long series is divided into six segments, each involving a mystery case that Wisely has to solve.

Shadow (影子)

Uncle Cai is accused of murdering a man who claimed that his shadow was after his life. Wisely investigates the mystery and learns that the shadow is the ghost of a man who committed suicide by throwing himself into a charcoal kiln. Once the shadow attaches himself to someone, he can control the person's movements and make him/her do things against his/her will. Wisely helps the shadow find a new "home", a rare piece of charcoal, and in return, the shadow helps to prove Uncle Cai's innocence. After the incident is over, Wisely's friends steal the charcoal out of mischief and accidentally destroy it. The shadow swears to take his revenge unless Wisely and his friends find him a similar piece of charcoal. When they fail, they have no choice but to lure the shadow into a trap and destroy him.

Heavenly Book (天书)

Wisely and Bai Su meet Fang Qi, a fortune teller, who predicts his own death and says three events will happen to Bai Su. First, Bai Su will lose something important but will get it back later. Second, Chief Bai (Bai Su's father) will be affected by a life-threatening illness but will eventually survive. Third, Bai Su will die on 7 July. Fang Qi is murdered later and the first two events happened as he predicted. In the meantime, Wen Baoyu encounters and romances the alien Haide, who has come to Earth to search for the Jade Compass and Heavenly Book – the two items Fang Qi used to predict the future. Wisely tries to get hold of the Heavenly Book and use it to change Bai Su's destiny, but fails as she still dies from a serious injury on 7 July. At this critical moment, Haide uses her powers to bring Bai Su back to life and then leaves for her home planet with Wen Baoyu.

Reincarnation (轮回)

A serial murderer responsible for killing many young women over a span of 20 years strikes again. One of the victims was Guo Zeqing's girlfriend; Guo has been feeling depressed since her death and is determined to avenge her. While investigating the case, Guo meets Wang Yufen, who narrowly escaped from the killer. After the ordeal, Wang experiences visions about her past life as Laura, who was murdered by the killer on the day she was born, and believes she was Laura in her past life. She manages to contact David, Laura's dead fiancé, whose soul is trapped inside a computer system, and continues their past romance. With help from David and Wang Yufen's recollections of her past life, Guo manages to identify the killer, who turns out to be the forensic psychologist Lin Liren. Lin dies in a scuffle with Guo while trying to escape. Guo finally puts the past behind him and realises he has fallen in love with Wang Yufen.

Immortal (神仙)

Bai Su's ex-boyfriend enters a contract with a blue-blooded alien to "sell" ten years of his life to the business magnate Tao Qiquan in exchange for US$20 million. He is killed later when he tries to break his promise. The alien's spacecraft malfunctioned while he was travelling in space and he ended up on Earth. The only way for him to return home is to obtain two ancient daggers and use them to activate a signalling device in an Egyptian pyramid. He has agreed to help Tao Qiquan become immortal; in return, Tao will help him obtain the things he needs. Tao also secretly makes a side deal with Bai Su's brother, Bai Qiwei, to help him find the elixir of immortality in the pyramid. When Wisely's friend, the highly skilled thief Qi Bai, goes missing while searching for the dagger, Wisely and Bai Su travel to Egypt to find him. Bai Qiwei insists on joining them even though there are already tensions between him and Wisely. Wisely suspects Bai Qiwei is working with Tao Qiquan even though Bai Qiwei denies it. With help from the alien, they navigate their way past deadly traps in the pyramid and enter a secret chamber, where the elixir and signalling device are located. Wisely and Bai Su fall into an underground chamber after Bai Qiwei accidentally opens a trap door. Bai Qiwei then kills the alien and seizes the elixir for himself. The three of them escape from the pyramid before it collapses. After returning to Coral Island, Wisely tricks Bai Qiwei into revealing his dealings with Tao Qiquan and secretly records their conversation. When Bai Qiwei finds out, he attacks Wisely but accidentally falls off a tower and dies.

Building (大厦)

One of Bai Su's colleagues goes missing in a new building and is eventually found dead on the roof. He purportedly fell to his death from a high location even though there are no taller buildings in the vicinity. Bai Su and Guo Zeqing seek help from Wisely in solving the mystery, but they also disappear under strange circumstances while taking the lift in the building. While investigating, Wisely enters the lift and ends up being trapped and transported through time into a fourth dimension, which is actually a secret experiment sponsored by Tao Qiquan. Wisely meets Bai Su and Guo in the fourth dimension and manages to make his way out. He teams up with Qi Bai to confront Tao Qiquan and destroy his lab. Wisely enters the fourth dimension again and successfully brings Bai Su and Guo with him out of the dimension. Upon returning to their time zone, they are ambushed by Tao's henchmen. Bai Su is shot while using her body to shield Wisely and ends up in a coma.

Souls (离魂)

Due to an accident during a thunderstorm, Bai Su's body is struck by lightning and her soul leaves her body. Bei Mengdan is able to communicate with Bai Su's soul and decides to help her after seeing how distressed Wisely feels over Bai Su's condition. She lets Bai Su's soul possess her body and then electrocutes herself and Bai Su's body so that Bai Su's soul can return to her body. She succeeds in her attempt but loses her sense of sight as a consequence.

God of Wishes (愿望之神)

When Qi Bai is accused of committing rape and murder, Wisely refuses to believe the accusations and secretly helps his friend escape from police custody. However, he makes a shocking discovery later that there are actually two Qi Bais. The other Qi Bai is a clone of the real Qi Bai and has been responsible for committing the evil deeds. He follows the real Qi Bai to a secret room inside an old mansion which supposedly contains a treasure that can lead one to the God of Wishes. They see that the room is filled with mirrors and has nothing inside except for an empty chest. Qi Bai and his clone are eventually cornered by the police in a hostage situation. Qi Bai commits suicide because that is the only way to destroy his clone. However, the entire saga is not over yet because a clone of Wisely was created when Wisely entered the secret room. Wisely is caught off guard by his clone, knocked out and held captive. His clone then impersonates him, harms his loved ones and close friends, and terrorises the city by setting off poison gas bombs. Wisely manages to break out of captivity, proves his identity to his friends, and puts an end to his evil clone's rampage. Before the series ends, he visits the God of Wishes in an ancient Egyptian temple and makes three wishes.

== Cast ==
- Michael Tao as Wisely
- Li Nanxing as Guo Zeqing
- Zoe Tay as Bai Su
- Kenneth Tsang as Chief Bai
- Lin Yisheng as Chen Changqing
- Yvonne Lim as Huang Honghong
- Chew Chor Meng as Wen Baoyu
- Kym Ng as Haide
- Bernard Tan as Bai Qiwei
- Richard Low as Uncle Cai
- Lisa Chiao Chiao as Aunt Cai
- Jerry Chang as Qi Bai / David
- Phyllis Quek as Wang Yufen / Laura
- Aileen Tan as Bei Mengdan
- Mak Hiu-wai as Lin Liren
- Yan Bingliang as Tao Qiquan
- Xu Meiluan as Cat

== Accolades ==
Organisation	Year	Award	Nominee	Result	Ref.
Star Awards	1998	Best Drama Serial	—N/a	Nominated	
Star Awards	1998	Best Actor	Li Nanxing	Nominated	

== See also ==
- Wisely Series, the novel series by Ni Kuang
- Films and television series adapted from the Wisely Series:
  - The Seventh Curse, a 1986 Hong Kong film starring Chow Yun-fat as Wisely
  - The Legend of Wisely, a 1987 Hong Kong film starring Sam Hui as Wisely
  - The Cat (1992 film), a 1998 Hong Kong film starring Waise Lee as Wisely
  - The Wesley's Mysterious File, a 2002 Hong Kong film starring Andy Lau as Wisely
  - The 'W' Files, a 2003 Hong Kong television series starring Gallen Lo as Wisely
