= The Avenging Eagle =

1978 Hong Kong film by Sun Chung

- Film poster
- 冷血十三鷹
- Directed by: Sun Chung
- Written by: Ni Kuang
- Produced by: Run Run Shaw
- Starring: Ti Lung; Alexander Fu; Ku Feng; Wang Lung-wei; Eddy Ko; Austin Wai
- Cinematography: Lam Ngai Kai
- Edited by: Chiang Hsing-lung; Yu Siu-fung
- Music by: Frankie Chan
- Production company: Shaw Brothers Studio
- Distributed by: Shaw Brothers Studio
- Release date: 13 September 1978
- Running time: 87 minutes
- Country: Hong Kong
- Language: Mandarin

The Avenging Eagle (冷血十三鷹) is a 1978 Hong Kong wuxia film produced by the Shaw Brothers Studio, starring Ti Lung, Alexander Fu and Ku Feng. A remake of the film, titled The 13 Cold-Blooded Eagles, was released in 1993.

== Plot ==
Qi Mingxing was raised and trained by Yue Xihong, the leader of a bandit clan, to be a ruthless killer, alongside other orphans, whom Yue calls "Eagles". After a rough heist, Qi is wounded and becomes unconscious, but is saved by Wang An, an enemy of Yue. While recovering, Qi starts to rethink his life. He ultimately decides to leave the clan, but finds himself a target of his former fellow Eagles.

While on the run, Qi meets Zhuo Yifan, who is seeking revenge for the murder of his family. It turns out that Qi and the Eagles were the ones who had killed Zhuo's family earlier. However, Zhuo joins forces with Qi instead to confront Yue and the bandit clan. At one point, Yue attempts to manipulate Qi and Zhuo into turning against each other, but they outsmart him and kill him.

Once Yue is dead, Qi tells Zhuo that he is ready to pay for killing Zhuo's family. When Zhuo spares him, Qi forces himself upon Zhuo's double blades and dies. The film ends with Zhuo overlooking his family's graves, with Qi being laid to rest beside them.

== Cast ==
- Ti Lung as Qi Mingxing
- Alexander Fu as Zhuo Yifan
- Ku Feng as Yue Xihong
- Wang Lung-wei as Yan Lin
- Eddy Ko as Wan Da
- Austin Wai as Qiu Gaocheng
- Bruce Tong as Xin Song
- Lam Fai-wong as Deng Xing
- Dick Wei as Di Ziqiang
- Wong Pau-gei as Lian Jinming
- Peter Chan as Fang Hui
- Yuen Bun as You Guanxiong
- Jamie Luk as Fan Lun
- Cheung Gwok-wa as Peng Daosheng
- Shih Szu as Wang Xiaofeng
- Yue Wing as Wang An
- Tong Gai as Tao Debiao
- Yeung Chi-hing as Sima Xin
- Ouyang Sha-fei as Sima Xin's wife
- Jenny Tseng as Sima Yuqin
- Yau Chui-ling as Sima Xin's second daughter
- Lui Hung as Wang An's mother
- Hung Ling-ling as Wang An's wife

== Release ==
The film is released on DVD by Dragon Dynasty in the United States and this version had 1 minute and 27 seconds of missing footage of the final fight scene. It is believed that the original source for this footage was damaged and was cut from the final release. It was announced in July 2013 that there have been plans for a remake to start shooting in 2014 with collaboration between Celestial Pictures and The Weinstein Company.
