= The Seventh Curse =

1986 Hong Kong film by Lam Ngai Kai

- Film poster
- Directed by: Lam Ngai Kai
- Screenplay by: Wong Jing; Yuen Gai-chi
- Based on: Dr. Yuen Series by Ni Kuang
- Produced by: Wong Jing; Chua Lam
- Starring: Chow Yun-fat; Chin Siu-ho; Dick Wei; Maggie Cheung; Sibelle Hu
- Narrated by: Ni Kuang
- Cinematography: Lam Wa-chui
- Edited by: Yu Ma-chiu; Siu Fung; Ma Chung-yiu; Cheung Man-keung
- Music by: Stephen Shing
- Production company: Paragon Films
- Distributed by: Golden Harvest
- Release date: 17 October 1986
- Running time: 83 minutes
- Country: Hong Kong
- Languages: Cantonese; English
- Box office: HK$10,219,984

The Seventh Curse is a 1986 Hong Kong action horror film directed by Lam Ngai Kai. The film is based on Ni Kuang's novel series Dr. Yuen Series. The film stars Chin Siu-ho as Dr. Yuen Chen-hsieh, and Chow Yun-fat as Wisely, the protagonist in Ni's Wisely Series who appears as a supporting character in the Dr Yuen Series, while Ni serves as the film's narrator and makes a brief appearance as himself.

== Plot ==
Dr. Yuen attempts to rescue a beautiful girl from being sacrificed to the "Worm Tribe" she belongs to. Yuen is damned with seven "Blood Curses" which burst through his leg periodically. He will die when the seventh bursts, but Bachu, the girl he saved, stops the curse with an antidote. The antidote only lasts one year, so on the advice of Wisely he heads back to Thailand to find a permanent cure. Yuen and his allies battle the evil sorcerer of the Worm Tribe, a hideous bloodthirsty baby-like creature, and "Old Ancestor," a skeleton with glowing blue eyes that transforms into a monster.

== Alternative versions ==
This film has at least three different endings for each of its official releases:

- In the original theatrical release, after the monster-killing climax, there's another by-the-pool-party scene (same pool as seen in the beginning of the film, but is supposed to be another party) in which Maggie Cheung's character makes up with Dr. Yuen. Then, we cut to the original party-scene that starts off the movie with Dr. Yuen, Wisely, Ni Kuang (the real author of the two pulp-novel series) and a bunch of beautiful girls. As the author finishes telling the movie's story to the girls, one of them asks if he has another adventure story to tell. The author replies, "Well, we have to see what exciting adventures Dr. Yuen and Wisely are going to have." The two main characters come into frame, toast and finish their drink. Freeze-frame, then comes the end-title music and credits.
- In the first video release available in Hong Kong during the late 1980s-early 1990s, the last two scenes were completely cut out, so as the very last close-up of Bachu, the native girl. Instead it is replaced with a two-shot of her and her lover, while the end credits roll partly over its freeze-frame, partly over black. Also, in that video release, the native girl's nude scenes were partly censored with the explicit body parts blacked out to make the film more "family-oriented".
- In the DVD-edition, the second-to-last scene in the original theatrical release is cut out, whilst the final scene is retained, but with the end credits rolling over. The original dialogues are replaced with the end-title music.

== Cast ==
- Chow Yun-fat as Wisely
- Chin Siu-ho as Dr. Yuen Chen-hsieh
- Dick Wei as Black Dragon
- Maggie Cheung as Tsui Hung
- Sibelle Hu as Su
- Chui Sau-lai as Bachu
- Elvis Tsui as Sorcrer Aquala
- Chor Yuen as Chu
- Yasuaki Kurata as Captain Ho
- Ken Boyle as The Professor
- Kara Hui as Inspector Chiang
- Ni Kuang as himself/narrator (voice)
- Joyce Godenzi as Pool Party Girl (long version)
- Wong Jing as Would-be Playboy
- Wang Lung-wei as Head Terrorist
- Derek Yee as SDU Officer
- Nina Li Chi as Champagne Girl (uncredited)

== See also ==
- Chow Yun-fat filmography
- Films and television series adapted from the Wisely Series:
  - The Legend of Wisely, a 1987 Hong Kong film starring Samuel Hui as Wisely
  - The Cat (1992 film), a 1992 Hong Kong film starring Waise Lee as Wisely
  - The New Adventures of Wisely, a 1998 Singaporean television series starring Michael Tao as Wisely
  - The Wesley's Mysterious File, a 2002 Hong Kong film starring Andy Lau as Wisely
  - The 'W' Files, a 2003 Hong Kong television series starring Gallen Lo as Wisely
