= The 'W' Files =

Hong Kong television series

- DVD cover
- Genre: Period drama Action; Science fantasy Adventure; Mystery
- Created by: Nelson Cheung; Wong Kwok-fai
- Based on: Wisely Series by Ni Kuang
- Written by: Wong Kwok-fai; Lilian Chan; Au Wing-ting; Tsang Po-wah; Tong Kin-ping; Law Chun-kei; Chan Kei; Tsui Sze-lok; Wong Mei-seung; Lee Ho
- Directed by: Joe Chan; Wong Kwok-fai; Lee Kin-wo; Ho Nam-chuen; Hui Sui-ping
- Starring: Gallen Lo; Yoyo Mung; Matt Yeung; Mak Cheung-ching; Michael Tong; Tavia Yeung; Power Chan; Eddy Ko; Roger Kwok; Anne Heung
- Theme music composer: Chan Tsung-hung
- Opening theme: Mei Loi Dik Sau Mong Je (未來的守望者) performed by Gallen Lo
- Ending theme: Yu Gwo Sai Kai Mat Yau Nei (如果世界沒有你) performed by Gallen Lo
- Country of origin: Hong Kong
- Original language: Cantonese
- No. of episodes: 30

Production
- Executive producer: Nelson Cheung
- Production locations: Hong Kong; Shanghai, China
- Camera setup: Multi camera
- Running time: 45 minutes (each)
- Production company: TVB

Original release
- Network: Jade
- Release: 2 June – 11 July 2003

The 'W' Files
- Traditional Chinese: 衛斯理
- Simplified Chinese: 卫斯理
- Literal meaning: "Wisely"
Transcriptions
Standard Mandarin
- Hanyu Pinyin: Wèi Sī Lǐ
Yue: Cantonese
- Jyutping: Wai6 Si1 Lei5

The 'W' Files (衛斯理) is a 2003 Hong Kong science fantasy-action-adventure-mystery television period drama serial based on Ni Kuang's novel series Wisely Series, starring Gallen Lo as Wisely. The series was first broadcast on TVB in Hong Kong from 2 June to 11 July 2003. The 30-episodes long series contains a total of eight different stories, set in China in the 1930s.

== Plot ==
In the 1930s, Wisely returns to China from his overseas studies and runs a detective agency in Shanghai to investigate paranormal events. He meets a doctor named Pak So and she becomes his love interest, but they encounter several trials and tribulations to test their love before they finally get together. The series is divided into eight different stories, with Wisely and his team setting off to investigate and crack each mystery case. The stories are listed as follows:

- Paper Monkey (紙猴)
- Deadly Body Change (屍變)
- Charcoal (木炭)
- Searching Dreams (尋夢)
- Bug Suspect (蠱惑)
- Supernatural Beings (神仙)
- Ghost Story (鬼混)
- Disturbing Graves (盜墓)

== Cast ==
=== Detective agency ===
Cast	Role	Description
Gallen Lo	Wisely	Boss of the detective agency
Tavia Yeung	Wong Hung-hung	Wisely's cousin
Mak Cheung-ching	Kwok Tsak-ching	Wisely's assistant
Power Chan	Chan Cheung-ching	Wisely's assistant
Fiona Yuen	Choi May-sin	Wisely's secretary

=== Pak family ===
Cast	Role	Description
Eddy Ko	Boss Pak	Boss of the Green Gang
Michael Tong	Pak Kei-wai	Boss Pak's son; Pa-chu's husband
Yoyo Mung	Pak So	Boss Pak's daughter; Wisely's girlfriend
Halina Tam	Pa-chu	Pak Kei-wai's wife
Suet Nei	Aunt Ho	Pak family's servant

=== Green Gang ===
Cast	Role	Description
Benz Hui	Sung Kin	Sung Fuk's brother
Chan Wing-chun	Sung Fuk	Sung Kin's brother
Yeung Ka-nok	To Chung	
Daniel Kwok	Ma Cheung	
Peter Pang	Shum Ming	
Tsui Wing	Chow Chung	
Lee Kai-kit	Ho Mou	
Lee Kong-lung	Ching Yee	
Leo Tsang	Hon Sam	
Hoi Sang Lee	Lau Ah-kan	

=== Wan family ===
Cast	Role	Description
Mimi Chu	Mrs. Wan	Medicine shop boss Wan Po-yu's mother
Mat Yeung	Wan Po-yu	News journalist
Sharon Chan	Lam Tai-yuk	Wan Po-yu's cousin
Yu Mo-lin	Deaf Granny	Wan family's servant

=== Shanghai Police Bureau ===
Cast	Role	Description
Bowie Wu	Keung Wai-tai	Shanghai Police Bureau Chief
Jimmy Au	Tit-dan	Police Inspector; Wisely's former classmate
Ngo Ka-nin	Wong Tong	Senior Policeman
Kam Chi-ching	Policeman	
Adam Ip	Policeman	
Hoffman Cheng	Policeman	

=== Others ===
Cast	Role	Description
Chun Wong	Old Choi	Wisely's housekeeper
Apple Ha	Sister Fan	Wisely's house servant
John Tang	Wu Suet	Doctor
Joe Junior	Uncle Sam	Performer in restaurant
Deno Cheung	Gobi	Inventor; Wisely's friend
David Do	Desert	Inventor; Wisely's friend
Ken Lok	Lei Yau-wai	Newspaper agency boss
Brian Wong	Ha Kwai-jo	Reporter
Wilson Tsui	Uncle Po	Pawn shop boss; Chan Cheung-ching's uncle
Ho Man-kit	Pau Siu-lung	Pawn shop worker
Nancy Wu	Lau Lai-ling's fan	Train station extra; appears in Ep. 11

=== Characters in Paper Monkey ===
Cast	Role	Description
Lau Kong	Chun Cheng-hei	
Wong Man-piu	Yu Ting-man	
Cheng Fan-sang	Ka Number Two	
Luk Chun-kwong	Kwai Fu Bong	
Suen Kwai-hing	Factory supervisor	

=== Characters in Deadly Body Change ===
Cast	Role	Description
Ku Feng	Cheng Tin-luk	Deceased patriarch of Cheng family
Law Lan	Mrs Cheng	Deceased wife of Cheng Tin-luk
Timothy Cheng	Cheng Po-wan	Cheng Tin-luk's son
Eric Chung	Dr Fai Kak	
Wong Wai-tung	Ah-sing	
Catherine Chau	Ah-sing's girlfriend	
So Lai-ming	Cheng Po-wan's secretary	
Yau Piu	Cheng family's servant	
Ngai Wai-man	Cheng family's servant	

=== Characters in Charcoal ===
Cast	Role	Description
Felix Lok	Kai Sei	
Ellesmere Choi	Lam Tsi-yun; Lam Pak-chun	Lam Pak-chun is Lam Tsi-yun's son
Raymond Tsang	Bin Ng	Kai Say's follower
Kwan Ching	Lam Yuk-sing	Lam family's ancestor
Janice Shum	Lam Tsi-yun's wife	

=== Characters in Searching Dreams ===
Cast	Role	Description
Roger Kwok (Guest star)	Yeung Lap-kwan	Architect
Anne Heung (Guest star)	Lau Lai-ling	Singer; introduced in Ep. 11
Lau Yuk-tsui	Hung Yuk-tsing	Yeung Lap-kwan's wife
Chan Tik-hak	Wu Hip-sing	
Chu Kin-kwan	Siu Chin	Yeung Lap-kwan's previous incarnation
Wah Chung-nam	Wong Sing	Wu Hip-sing's previous incarnation
Tse Po-law	Leung Pak-tsung	Hung Yuk-tsing's previous incarnation
Kwok Tak-shun	Lam Kei-lung	
Chan Min-leung	Chin Yung	
Ling Lai-man	Uncle Chik	
Wong Tsi-wai	Yeung Lap-kwan's secretary	
Ting Chu-wai	Ah-say	

=== Characters in Bug Suspect ===
Cast	Role	Description
Kong Hon	King-ban	Tribal chief
Mok Ka-yiu	Mang-kor	
Reyan Yan	Pa-tsi	To Chung's girlfriend
King Kong Lam	Yat-ting	King-ban's son
Fung Hiu-man	Aunt Kam-fa	Pa-chu's aunt
Anders Nelsson	Dr. Stone	

=== Characters in Supernatural Beings ===
Cast	Role	Description
Kwok Fung	Ka Yuk-tsan	
Yu Tze-ming	Lau Sing; Lau Hoi	Lau Sing and Lau Hoi are brothers
Dickson Lee	San-kau Ya-tsat	Japanese general
Cheng On-tung	Fung Yuen-yee	To Chung's wife
Yu Tin-wai	Old immortal	
Ngan Kin-kwok	Young immortal	

=== Characters in Ghost Story ===
Cast	Role	Description
Liu Kai-chi	Chai-wong	Voodoo master
Wong Ching	Si-noi	Voodoo master; Chai-wong's apprentice brother
Eileen Yeow	Yu Fa / Chuen-to Fa-tsi	San-kau Ya-tsat's follower
Ho Chi-cheung	San-kau Ya-tsat's henchman	
Cheung Hon-ban	San-kau Ya-tsat's henchman	

=== Characters in Disturbing Graves ===
Cast	Role	Description
Derek Kok	Colonel Ching-lung	
Savio Tsang	Tsai-pak	Pak Kei-wai's friend
Yu Yeung	Brigade General Wong	Ching-lung's boss
Gregory Charles Rivers	Nelson	American secret agent
Law Tin-chi	Nelson's follower	
Cheung Hak	Man in black	
Chuk Man-kwan	Lin-heung	

== Popular Culture Trivia ==
- It Had to Be You (released in 1924) is a popular, romantic song that was written by Gus Kahn and composed by Isham Jones. Joe Junior performed the song throughout the series.
- Ruan Lingyu was a popular silent film actress in Shanghai from 1927 to 1935. Her fame and tragic suicide were occasionally mentioned throughout the series whenever the characters read articles about Ruan Lingyu from the newspaper. After their movie date, Choi May-sin discussed briefly with Wisely about Ruan's character in her notable film The Goddess (1934 film).
- When Will You Return? - 何日君再來 is a classic song that was released in 1937, Shanghai and was first performed by Zhou Xuan in the same year. Lau Lai-ling performed a segment of this song in the Searching Dreams story.
- Loch Ness has garnered national attention in 1933 due to the public's interest in the Loch Ness Monster. At the end of the series, Wisely and Pak So ended up together on a small boat in a lake. Pak So asked Wisely, "This lake is so big. Can you guess what lake is this?" Wisely responded, "I don't care what lake this is, as long as there's no strange things/events that will occur to interrupt our alone time together." The camera zoomed out and showed the sign Loch Ness and then zoomed out even further showing a giant creature swimming and howling underwater.

== See also ==
- Wisely Series, the novel series by Ni Kuang
- Films and television series adapted from the Wisely Series:
  - The Seventh Curse, a 1986 Hong Kong film starring Chow Yun-fat as Wisely
  - The Legend of Wisely, a 1987 Hong Kong film starring Sam Hui as Wisely
  - The Cat (1992 film), a 1998 Hong Kong film starring Waise Lee as Wisely
  - The New Adventures of Wisely, a 1998 Singaporean television series starring Michael Tao as Wisely
  - The Wesley's Mysterious File, a 2002 Hong Kong film starring Andy Lau as Wisely
