= The Wesley's Mysterious File =

2002 Hong Kong film by Andrew Lau

- Film poster

Chinese name
- Traditional Chinese: 衛斯理藍血人
- Simplified Chinese: 卫斯理蓝血人
Transcriptions
Standard Mandarin
- Hanyu Pinyin: Wèisīlǐ Lán Xuè Rén
Yue: Cantonese
- Jyutping: Wai6 si1 lei5 Laam4 Hyut3 Jan4
- Directed by: Andrew Lau
- Screenplay by: Wong Jing; Thirteen Chan
- Based on: Wisely Series by Ni Kuang
- Produced by: Wong Jing
- Starring: Andy Lau; Rosamund Kwan; Shu Qi
- Cinematography: Andrew Lau; Ko Chiu-lam; Horace Wong
- Edited by: Marco Mak
- Music by: Chan Kwong-wing; Ken Chan
- Production company: Teamwork Motion Pictures
- Distributed by: China Star Entertainment Group
- Release date: 28 March 2002
- Running time: 87 minutes
- Country: Hong Kong
- Language: Cantonese
- Box office: HK$9,057,015

The Wesley's Mysterious File (Chinese: 衛斯理藍血人) is a 2002 Hong Kong action science fiction film directed by Andrew Lau starring Andy Lau, Rosamund Kwan and Shu Qi. Hong Kong director Wong Jing also makes a cameo appearance. The film is an adaptation of a novel by Ni Kuang.

== Plot ==
The film tells the story of Wesley who works in San Francisco for a UN department investigating extra terrestrial sightings. When Fong an alien from the Dark Blue Planet arrives in town seeking the remains of her brother, Wesley; Fong and two agents from a secret FBI alien department become entangled in a conspiracy involving the government departments and two different alien species.

== Cast ==
- Andy Lau as Wesley
- Rosamund Kwan as Fong Tin-ai
- Shu Qi as Pak Sue
- Wong Jing as Dr. Kwok
- Mark Cheng as Kill
- Almen Wong as Rape
- Roy Cheung as Pak Kei-wai
- Samuel Pang as Tan
- Patrick Lung as Mr. Chu
- Yo Yo Fong as Ling-ling
- Thomas Hudak as Wilson
- Beverly Hotsprings
- Tré Shine
- Vincent Zhao

== See also ==
- Girls with guns
- Wisely Series, the novel series by Ni Kuang
- Films and television series adapted from the Wisely Series:
  - The Seventh Curse, a 1986 Hong Kong film starring Chow Yun-fat as Wisely
  - The Legend of Wisely, a 1987 Hong Kong film starring Sam Hui as Wisely
  - The Cat (1992 film), a 1992 Hong Kong film starring Waise Lee as Wisely
  - The New Adventures of Wisely, a 1998 Singaporean television series starring Michael Tao as Wisely
  - The 'W' Files, a 2003 Hong Kong television series starring Gallen Lo as Wisely
