= The Kung Fu Instructor =

1979 Hong Kong film by Sun Chung

Chinese name
- Chinese: 教頭
Transcriptions
Standard Mandarin
- Hanyu Pinyin: jiào tóu
Yue: Cantonese
- Jyutping: gaau3 tau4
- Directed by: Sun Chung
- Screenplay by: Ni Kuang
- Produced by: Run Run Shaw
- Starring: Ti Lung; Wong Yu; Ku Feng
- Cinematography: Lam Nai-Choi
- Edited by: Chiang Hsing-Lung; Yu Siu-Fung
- Music by: Eddie H. Wang Chi-Ren
- Production company: Shaw Brothers Studio
- Distributed by: World Wide Entertainment
- Release date: 1979
- Running time: 104 minutes
- Country: Hong Kong
- Language: Mandarin

The Kung Fu Instructor is a 1979 Shaw Brothers martial arts film directed by Sun Chung, starring Ti Lung.

== Plot ==
In the town of Ho Si, two prominent Chinese clans have a family feud dating back centuries. The ancestors of the malevolent Mong clan and the righteous Chows split up their territories with a property line and instituted laws to keep each faction from crossing those lines. Those brave enough to traverse the line have their legs cut off by the opposing clan. The Chows want to do away with this ridiculous law and establish relations with the Mongs. But the clan leader Mong Fan wants nothing more than to totally eradicate his hated enemies. He seeks to recruit the best Kung Fu teacher in the land, Wong Yang to train his family members. Teacher Wong refuses because he knows that Mong Fan's men will use his teachings only for selfish purposes. Mong Fan comes up with an idea to frame Teacher Wong for murder. He arranges for a hired hand to start a fight with Teacher Wong in the center of town in front of the townsfolk. The man who challenges Teacher Wong is no match for him, and when the guy stumbles backwards after Teacher Wong pushes him away, he ends up falling onto wooden spikes that puncture his flesh. The guy promptly dies in view of everyone, and the townspeople turn against the respected Kung Fu instructor. Rather than face arrest, Teacher Wong flees so he can prove his innocence. An emissary of the Mong clan finds Teacher Wong hiding out, and claims that in exchange for martial arts lessons, Mong Fan will use his political clout to clear his name. Rather than face the alternative, Teacher Wong agrees to educate the Mongs in the ways of Kung Fu.

Chow Ping is a member of the Chow family who risks life and limb to traverse the boundary lines in order to witness Teacher Wong's agonizing lessons. Then Chow Ping returns to his makeshift training room to practice what he learned from the training sessions. At the Mong palace, Teacher Wong meets Chao Cheh, a beautiful young lady (adopted by the Mongs when she was an infant) who takes a liking to him. The careless Chow Ping is captured on the Mong territory and brought to Mong Fan for sentencing before they remove his limbs. Teacher Wong overhears and speaks up on behalf of Chow Ping. Teacher Wong tells Mong Fan he is taking Chow Ping back to the Chow's territory. Both Teacher Wong and Chow Ping fight their way through the Mong hordes and cross over the border where the Chow clan are happy to welcome them. Teacher Wong is impressed with Chow's Ping's desire to learn Kung Fu and offers to teach him the martial arts. One of Mong Fan's lackeys crosses the border to deliver a message to Teacher Wong. Mong Fan insists there is no hard feelings and begs Teacher Wong to continue training the Mongs. Teacher Wong insists they meet up to discuss the matter. During the negotiations, Mong Fan requests that Teacher Wong teach his men the unbeatable Shaolin Pole Style. Mong Fan firsts tries to bribe him, and then tries to blackmail him. Teacher Wong responds by accusing the Mongs of setting him up on the murder charge. Mong Fan tells him to collect his belongings and leave the Mong property. As Teacher Wong starts to do so, he is assaulted by Mong soldiers and seriously wounded. Chao Cheh hides him and tends to his wounds while the Mongs continue to search for him. Mong Fan then orders his men to murder some monks, so he can use his clout to place the blame on the Chow clan. The police soon round up the Chows and it looks like Mong Fan will have his way. But Teacher Wong vows to tutor Chow Ping in the ways of the Shaolin Pole Style. After some intensive training, Chow Ping comes up to speed. Teacher Wong insists that they pay a visit to the home of Mong Fan and expose the truth and clear the name of the Chow family. However, Mong Fan learns of their upcoming arrival, and plans a trap to eradicate his enemies.

== Production ==
The Kung Fu Instructor was the first Shaw Brothers film partly shot with a steadicam.

== Cast ==
- Ku Feng as Mong Fan
- Ti Lung as Wong Yang
- Wang Yu as Chow Ping
- Angie Chiu
- Johnny Wang
- Ai Fei
- Chiang Tao
