= The 13 Cold-Blooded Eagles =

1993 Hong Kong film by Chui Fat

- DVD cover of the U.S. release
- 新冷血十三鷹
- Directed by: Chui Fat
- Screenplay by: Yu Yee
- Based on: The Avenging Eagle by Ni Kuang
- Produced by: Chui Fat
- Starring: Waise Lee; Cynthia Khan
- Cinematography: Ma Kam-cheung
- Edited by: Cheng Ka-hung; Cheng Keung
- Music by: Wong Yau-ling
- Production company: Cheung Yau Production
- Release date: 11 November 1993
- Running time: 93 minutes
- Country: Hong Kong
- Language: Cantonese

The 13 Cold-Blooded Eagles (新冷血十三鷹) is a 1993 Hong Kong wuxia adapted from the novel The Avenging Eagle by Ni Kuang, and a remake of the 1978 film The Avenging Eagle. It was produced and directed by Chui Fat, and starred Waise Lee and Cynthia Khan.

== Synopsis ==
During a cold day, the members of the Shinshu Sect madly robs a village and hides in the forest. Suddenly, a group of martial arts experts called the "13 Cold-Blooded Eagles" dash in, kill them, and return to base to report to their foster father, Yue Xihong. Yue then commands them to kill Monster, the leader of Shinshu and take his "Seven Stars Reserpine Technique" manual. The Eagles ride up to peak of Mount Hua, where Monster resides. There, the Eagles corner Monster at the edge of the cliff while Monster grabs Qi Yingming and falls off the cliff together. Monster dies afterwards while Qi was heavily injured but was rescued by Cuihua and taken back to her estate. There, Cuihua nurses Qi back to health and Qi returns to the Flying Eagle Fort without Cuihua knowing his true identity. Yue discovers that the manual is in the hands of Ao Tianheng and he orders his apprentices to assassinate Ao and take the manual. Qin thinks that Ao had never committed any evil deeds in the jianghu, so he should not put the blame on an innocent man, but he had to obey his master. In a hut, the sickly Ao was meditating before three of the Eagles come in from the window. Ao's daughter Cuihua draws her sword to protect her father and battle the five Eagles. Red Eagle, White Eagle, Gold Eagle and Black Eagle come to assist. Just as Cuihua was losing support, a Taoist priest comes to rescue her and strikes Red Eagle into a hole in the ground. While inside the hole, Red Eagle finds his father who was trapped by Yue 20 years ago. Red Eagle's father passes him his neigong before dying. The angered Red Eagle runs back to the Flying Eagle Fort where he exposes Yue's evil deeds in front of everyone. However, he was blinded by a condor trained by Yue. Seeing how Red Eagle cannot die in peace, Qi feels very conflicted. Later, Yue orders Qi to go to Sunflower Island to kill its leader and take the manual away. However, Qi discovers that Cuihua is the leader of the island and was reluctant to kill her and decided to let her go but was stop by his fellow Eagles. Together with Cuihua, Qi kills all the Eagles and leaves Sunflower Island with her while being chased by Yue. Desperate to escape, Cuihua throws the manual into a rapid river where Yue jumps in. A few days later, Qi and Cuihua arrive at the Flying Eagle Fort to seek vengeance on Yue. Qi was heavily wounded after the battle while Cuihua uses all her neigong to push a bouquet of lilies that stab into Yue and kills him. The distressed Qi then holds Cuihua's corpse and slowly walks up the hill while facing the sun.

== Cast ==
- Waise Lee as Sima Yufeng (Red Eagle)
- Cynthia Khan as Cuihua
- Wan Seung-lam as White Eagle
- Lau Chi-wai as Qi Yingming (Silver Eagle)
- Anthony Cho as Gold Eagle
- Ng Ting-ko as Black Eagle
- Yen Shi-kwan as Yue Xihong
- Chung Fat as Shinshu Monster

== Critical reception ==
Kung Fu Cinema rated the film 4.5 out of 5 stars and gave a relatively positive review, writing "With decent production values and some gorgeous outdoor backdrops, The 13 Cold-Blooded Eagles is visually appealing. Add to that a solid story and plenty of exciting wirework action, the film manages to be a cut above the competition. Had the editing been more controlled or the characters fleshed out, the film could have been better."
