= Wisely Series =

Science fiction novel series by Ni Kuang

Wesley Series
- see list of novels
- Author: Ni Kuang
- Original title: 衛斯理系列
- Country: Hong Kong
- Language: Chinese
- Genre: Adventure fiction, detective fiction, science fiction
- Published: 1963–2004
- Media type: Print

Wisely Series
- Traditional Chinese: 衛斯理系列
- Simplified Chinese: 卫斯理系列
Transcriptions
Standard Mandarin
- Hanyu Pinyin: Wèisīlǐ Xìliè
Yue: Cantonese
- Jyutping: Wai⁶si¹lei5 Hai⁶-lit⁶

The Wisely Series is a series of Chinese-language adventure-science fiction novels written by the Hong Kong novelist Ni Kuang. The protagonist of the series is Wisely (sometimes also spelt "Wesley"). In total, there are 161 stories about Wisely recorded in 156 novels. Of these, only 150 stories in 145 novels are written by Ni Kuang; the remaining ones are written by other writers with Ni Kuang's permission. Some of these stories have been adapted into media, such as the films The Legend of Wisely (1987), The Cat (1992) and The Wesley's Mysterious File (2002), and the television series The New Adventures of Wisely (1998) and The 'W' Files (2004).

== Publishing history ==
Ni Kuang wrote 150 Wisely stories in the form of 145 novels, most of which have a serial number to reflect the chronological order of their year of publication. There are 11 other Wisely stories written by other writers with Ni Kuang's permission. There are a total of 161 Wisely stories in 156 novels. The first 94 stories (excluding the prequel Young Wisely with serial number 0), were first published in serial form in the Hong Kong newspaper Ming Pao from 1963–92 (with a discontinuation from 1973–78). The stories written from 1992–2004 were published in the form of printed books.

According to Ni Kuang, when he decided to publish the Wisely Series as a collection in the 1970s, he discovered that Ming Pao did not retain all the copies of his previous works. Luckily for him, he encountered a reader, Wen Naijian (溫乃堅), who collected all the copies of his stories published in Ming Pao. He was thus able to have his works republished and released in a multi-volume collection. He expressed his gratitude to Wen in the preface, "These books would not have been published without Mr Wen Naijian's help."

In Hong Kong, books 1–80 were published by Ming Chuang Publishing Company (明窗出版社; under Media Chinese International) while books 81–131 were published by Qin+Yuan Publishing Company (勤+緣出版社). In Taiwan, the books before book 67 were initially published by Yuanjing Publishing Company (遠景出版社) and later by Storm & Stress Publishing Company (風雲時代出版社). The books after book 67 were published by Crown Publishing Company (皇冠出版社).

Ni Kuang announced his decision to stop writing the Wisely Series after book 131 was published. His friend, Taiwanese writer Yeh Lee-hwa, wrote the Wisely Memoirs (衛斯理回憶錄) as an epilogue to the series, and to explain Wisely's life and clarify ambiguities in the stories.

== Overview of the stories ==
Wisely was a writer and adventurer trained in Chinese martial arts, who spends his time travelling around the world and solving mysteries in the vein of James Bond and various other Wuxia characters written by Ni Kuang, encountering extraordinary situations such as meeting with aliens and supernatural beings. Born in a wealthy family who run a trading company, little is known about his parents; it is assumed that they died early. The head of the family is Wisely's grandfather.

The novels are narrated from the point of view of Wisely (sometimes also spelt "Wesley"), the protagonist in the series. They are set in a modern era (1960s–2000s) in a city that is evidently based on Hong Kong. According to Ni Kuang, the character's name was inspired by Wesley Village (衛斯理村) along Tai Hang Road near Jardine's Lookout in Hong Kong. The village was named after John Wesley (1703–91), an English cleric who founded the Methodist movement within Anglican Christianity.

== List of Wisely novels by Ni Kuang ==
Serial number	Title	Published
1	Diamond Flower (鑽石花)	11 March – 21 July 1963
2	Underground Legends (地底奇人)	22 July 1963 – 12 February 1964
3	Wicked Fire (妖火)	13 February – 4 August 1964
4	Blue Blood Being (藍血人)	5 August 1964 – 19 February 1965
5	Transparentizing Light (透明光)	20 February – 22 July 1965
6	Furnace inside the Earth (地心洪爐)	23 July – 19 October 1965
7	Bee Cloud (蜂雲)	20 October 1965 – 6 February 1966
8	Mystic Jade (奇玉)	7 February – 22 March 1966
9	Atomic Space (原子空間)	23 March – 11 July 1966
10	Golden Globe from Beyond (天外金球)	12 July – 2 December 1966
11	Detachable Man (支離人)	3 December 1966 – 16 March 1967
12	Immortality Drug (不死藥)	17 March – 4 June 1967
13	Crimson Moon (紅月亮)	1 August – 15 November 1967
14	Head Transplant (換頭記)	16 November 1967 – 15 February 1968
15	Bewitched, Bewildered (蠱惑)	16 February – 7 April 1968
16	Uncanny Gate (奇門)	30 June – 21 September 1968
17	Zombified (屍變)	22 September – 24 November 1968
18	Synthesis (合成)	25 November 1968 – 21 January 1969
19	Pen Pal (筆友)	22 January – 10 March 1969
20	Deity in the Jungle (叢林之神)	11 March – 29 April 1969
21	Once again (再來一次)	30 April – 20 June 1969
22	The End (盡頭)	21 June – 16 August 1969
23	In the lake (湖水)	17 August – 15 September 1969
24	Vanishing (消失)	16 September – 15 October 1969
25	The Shadow (影子)	16 October – 4 December 1969
26	The Extra One (多了一個)	5 December 1969 – 14 January 1970
27	Wonderland (仙境)	15 January – 16 March 1970
28	A Transmuting Fox (狐變)	17 March – 10 May 1970
29	Archaic Sound (古聲)	11 May – 14 June 1970
30	Virtual Image (虛像)	15 June – 9 August 1970
31	The Visitor (訪客)	10 August – 18 September 1970
32	Feng Shui (風水)	19 September – 29 October 1970
33	The Ring (環)	30 October – 27 December 1970
34	Treasure Bowl (聚寶盆)	27 December 1970 – 30 January 1971
35	Rain Flower Stone (雨花台石)	4 February – 23 March 1971
36	Stone Forest (石林, new name: 魔磁)	24 March – 9 June 1971
37	Creation (創造)	10 June – 27 July 1971
38	Jap (鬼子)	28 July – 10 September 1971
39	Aged Cat (老貓)	11 September – 1 December 1971
40	Seashell (貝殼)	2 December 1971 – 7 February 1972
41	The Map (地圖)	8 February – 4 May 1972
42	Pattern (規律)	5 May – 23 June 1972
43	Shipwreck (沉船)	24 June – 21 September 1972
44	The Mansion (大廈)	22 September 1972 – 1 January 1973
45	New Year (新年)	2 January – 22 February 1973
46	Hair (頭髮)	1 March – 25 June 1978
47	The Eyes (眼睛)	26 June – 25 September 1978
48	Hide and Seek (迷藏)	26 September – 25 December 1978
49	Enigmatic Book (天書)	26 December 1978 – 10 April 1979
50	The Charcoal (木炭)	11 April – 8 August 1979
51	Toys (玩具)	9 August – 27 November 1979
52	Interlocking (連鎖)	13 February 1979 – 30 May 1980
53	Searching a Dream (尋夢)	31 May – 13 October 1980
54	Human of the Second Kind (第二種人)	14 October 1980 – 11 March 1981
55	The Backup (後備)	12 March – 22 June 1981
56	Tomb Raiding (盜墓)	23 June – 26 November 1981
57	Soul Seeking (搜靈)	27 November 1981 – 17 April 1982
58	Blurred Spot (茫點)	18 April – 20 September 1982
59	Immortals (神仙)	21 September 1982 – 30 January 1983
60	Tracking the Dragon (追龍)	31 January – 23 May 1983
61	Tunnel to the Heaven (洞天)	24 May – 14 September 1983
62	Terracotta Warrior Alive (活俑)	15 September 1983 – 7 January 1984
63	Rhino Illumination (犀照)	8 January – 9 May 1984
64	Destiny (命運)	10 May – 10 July 1984
65	17 Years (十七年)	11 July – 13 August 1984
66	A Peculiar Gem (異寶)	14 August – 17 November 1984
67	Extreme Penalty (極刑)	18 November 1984 – 4 March 1985
68	Home elestricus (電王)	5 March – 24 June 1985
69	The Game (遊戲)	25 June – 3 October 1985
70	The Key to the Bardo (生死鎖)	4 October 1985 – 15 January 1986
71	Story of Gold (黃金故事)	16 January – 2 May 1986
72	The Ruin (廢墟)	3 May – 13 August 1986

Serial number	Title	Published
73	The Cipher (密碼)	14 August – 24 November 1986
74	Bloodline (血統)	25 November 1986 – 16 March 1987
75	Mystifying Tracks (謎蹤)	17 March – 4 July 1987
76	The Plague Demon (瘟神)	5 July – 19 October 1987
77	Evocation (招魂)	20 October 1987 – 30 January 1988
78	Betrayal (背叛)	31 January – 15 May 1988
79	A Hybrid Ghost (鬼混)	16 May – 27 August 1988
80	Retribution (報應)	28 August – 11 December 1988
81	Err (錯手)	12 December 1988 – 6 April 1989
82	The Truth (真相)	7 April – 22 July 1989
83	Death Oath (毒誓)	23 July – 6 November 1989
84	Bet on It (拼命)	7 November 1989 – 23 February 1990
85	Monsters (怪物)	24 February – 8 June 1990
86	Proding (探險)	9 June – 23 September 1990
87	Probing Deeper (繼續探險)	24 September 1990 – 11 January 1991
88	Pitfall (圈套)	12 January – 28 April 1991
89	Females in Flame (烈火女)	29 April – 9 August 1991
90	The Great Secret (大秘密)	10 August – 22 November 1991
91	Canker (禍根)	23 November 1991 – 29 January 1992
92	From the Netherworld (從陰間來)	25 July 1991
93	To the Netherworld (到陰間去)	25 July 1991
94	Young Wesley Chronicles (少年衛斯理)	2 August 1991
95	Errands and Errancy (陰差陽錯)	17 December 1991
96	Lingering Soul (陰魂不散)	3 March 1992
97	Make a wish (許願)	23 May 1992
98	Resurrection (還陽)	16 August 1992
99	Live Atmosphere (運氣)	26 October 1992
100	Open Core Surgery (開心)	6 February 1993
101	Reincarnation Signs (轉世暗號)	11 April 1993
102	The Future (將來)	9 July 1993
103	The Change (改變)	12 September 1993
104	Reincarnation Signs II (暗號之二)	Late 1993
105	A Fatal Deed (闖禍)	11 January 1994
106	Doomed (在數難逃)	27 February 1994
107	Extrication (解脫)	16 April 1994
108	Inheritance (遺傳)	16 May 1994
109	The Explosion (爆炸)	30 September 1994
110	Palace under the Sea (水晶宮)	20 December 1994
111	Past Life (前世)	16 February 1995
112	The New Weapon (新武器)	11 April 1995
113	Virus (病毒)	26 May 1995
114	Do the Accounts (算帳)	9 August 1995
115	The True Form (原形)	2 November 1995
116	Way Out (活路)	20 January 1996
117	Two-Way (雙程)	2 March 1996
118	Primeval Chaos (洪荒)	10 May 1996
119	Life Quota Wanted (買命)	4 July 1996
120	Life Quota for Sale (賣命)	28 October 1996
121	The Trial (考驗)	30 January 1997
122	A Tale (傳說)	23 February 1997
123	The Bid Gamble (豪賭)	17 May 1997
124	Concrete Cloudland (真實幻境)	30 July 1997
125	Humanward Metamorphosing (成精變人)	2 November 1997
126	Future Identity (未來身份)	Early 1998
127	Body Snatching Monsters (移魂怪物)	24 March 1998
128	Face Combination (人面組合)	20 August 1998
129	Inherence Dies Hard (本性難移)	6 December 1998
130	Lightening of Justice (天打雷劈)	23 March 1999
131	Different Kind of Cloning (另類複製)	15 May 1999
132	The Cipher Demystified (解開密碼)	16 August 1999
133	Alternative Life (異種人生)	31 October 1999
134	An Immeasurable Fraud (偷天換日)	8 April 2000
135	In and Out of the Retreat (閉關開關)	22 May 2000
136	Taking Action for the Planet (行動救星)	9 August 2000
137	Knowledge Transplant (乾坤挪移)	24 December 2000
138	Mammon's Treasury (財神寶庫)	16 March 2001
139	Half and Half (一半一半)	4 May 2001
140	Replicant Surrogates (身外化身)	6 October 2001
141	Extraordinary Incident (非常遭遇)	22 January 2002
142	Somewhere (一個地方)	20 May 2002
143	A World in a Grain of Sand (須彌芥子)	7 December 2002
144	Hovering between Life and Death (死去活來)	4 June 2003
145	For Old Pals Only (只限老友)	Late February 2004

== Adaptations ==
The novel series has been adapted into comic series, radio dramas, films and television series since the 1980s.

=== Comics ===
- 1984–86 version illustrated by Li Chi-tak (利志達) and published by Sichen Publishing Company (斯辰出版社).
- 1984–86 version illustrated by Li Chi-tak and published by Sanyingshe Publishing Company (三英社出版社).
- 1988 version illustrated by Li Chi-tak and Yeung Hau-wing (楊孝榮), and published by Morning Star Publishing Company (晨星出版社).
- 1995 version illustrated by Wee Tian Beng (黄展鸣) and published by China Times Publishing Company (時報文化出版社).
- 2004 version illustrated by Xu Jingchen (許景琛) and published by Yisi Wenhua Publishing Company (意思文化出版社).

=== Radio dramas ===
- 1981–84 version broadcast on Hong Kong's RTHK. Chung Wai-ming voice-played Wisely.
- 1987–88 version broadcast on Hong Kong's CRHK. Chu Chi-chung voice-played Wisely.
- 2004 version broadcast on China's GZBN.
- 2005 version broadcast on Taiwan's Voice of Han.

=== Films ===
- The Seventh Curse (原振俠與衛斯理), a 1986 Hong Kong film starring Chow Yun-fat.
- The Legend of Wisely (衛斯理傳奇), a 1987 Hong Kong film starring Sam Hui.
- A Tale from the East (漫畫奇俠), a 1990 Hong Kong fantasy film. Ni Kuang made a guest appearance as Wisely.
- Bury Me High (衛斯理之霸王卸甲), a 1991 Hong Kong film starring Chin Kar-lok.
- The Cat (衛斯理之老貓), a 1992 Hong Kong film starring Waise Lee.
- Young Wisely (少年衛斯理之天魔之子), a 1993 Hong Kong film starring David Wu.
- Young Wisely 2 (少年衛斯理II聖女轉生), a 1994 Hong Kong film starring David Wu.
- The Wesley's Mysterious File (衛斯理之藍血人), a 2002 Hong Kong film starring Andy Lau.

=== Television series ===
- The Legend of Wisely (衛斯理傳奇), a 1983 Taiwanese television series produced by CTS, starring Yang Kuang-yu.
- The New Adventures of Wisely (卫斯理传奇), a 1998 Singaporean television series produced by TCS, starring Michael Tao.
- The 'W' Files (衛斯理), a 2003 Hong Kong television series produced by TVB, starring Gallen Lo.
- Wesley the Young Adventurer (少年王衛斯理/冒險王), a 2003 Chinese television series starring Nicky Wu.
- The Great Adventurer Wesley (冒險王衛斯理), a 2018 Chinese online/television series starring Shawn Yue.
