= Amy Yip =

Hong Kong actress (born 1966)

- 葉子楣
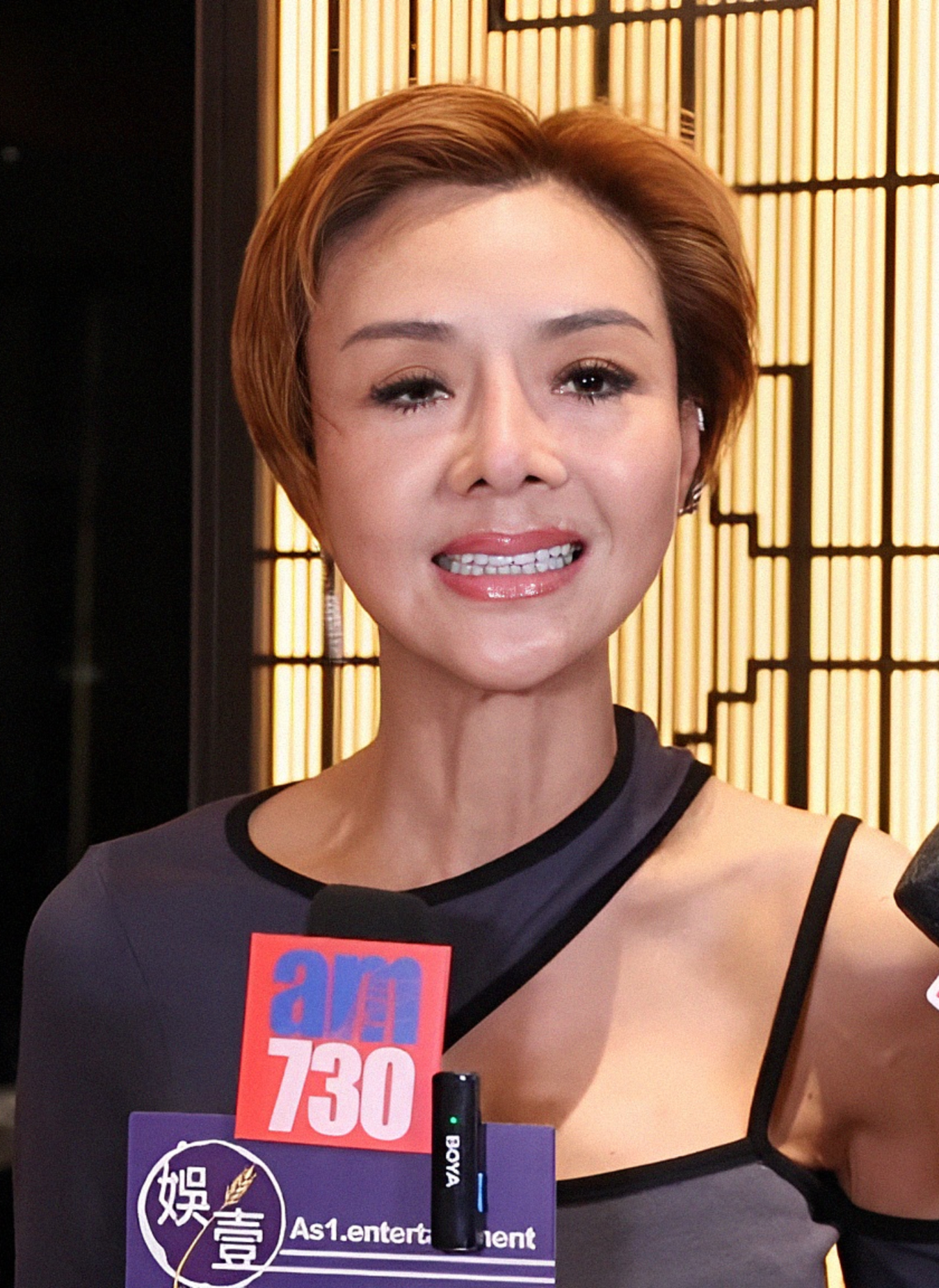
- Yip in 2023 at a charity event in Hong Kong
- Born: 10 July 1966 (age 60); Hong Kong
- Occupations: Actress; model; entrepreneur
- Years active: 1984–1997
- Height: 5 ft 3 in (160 cm)
- Partner: Sammy Lui (1992–2018)

Chinese name
- Traditional Chinese: 葉子楣
- Simplified Chinese: 叶子楣
Transcriptions
Standard Mandarin
- Hanyu Pinyin: Yè Zǐmèi
Yue: Cantonese
- Jyutping: Jip6 Zi2 Mei4

Amy Yip Chi-mei (born 10 July 1966), commonly known as Amy Yip or Boba, is a Hong Kong former actress, model and entrepreneur. Known for her small frame and voluptuous figure, she was one of the leading sex symbols of Hong Kong cinema in the late 1980s and early 1990s. Yip began her entertainment career as a trainee with the Hong Kong broadcaster Asia Television (ATV), taking on minor television roles after signing a two-year contract in 1985. During her tenure at ATV, she was approached by Raymond Chow, founder of the film production company Golden Harvest, who offered her a position once her contract ended. She had small roles in films such as Jackie Chan's Miracles and The Inspector Wears Skirts 2 (both 1989), until she starred in Category III film Erotic Ghost Story (1990).

By 1994, she had starred in more than twenty films, most notably The Magnificent Scoundrels, Great Pretenders, Robotrix, To Be Number One, and Sex and Zen. She retired from acting in 1997. She has garnered a cult following for the numerous films that she starred in. As an entrepreneur, she is the owner of The Leith Penang, a boutique hotel in Penang, Malaysia. She is also the non-executive director and brand ambassador of Artiste Hotel Management in Malaysia.

== Career ==
Born in Hong Kong on 10 July 1966, she has family roots in Taishan, Guangdong. Yip's father was a barber, and her mother was a housewife. She is the youngest of five children. After studying at Kau Kam English College, Yip first started working in the entertainment industry as a trainee for Asia Television, appearing in small television roles after signing a two-year contract with them in 1985. During her training, she was approached by Golden Harvest founder Raymond Chow, who made her an offer to join his company after fulfilling her contract with ATV. Yip agreed, but stipulated in the contract that she would not be shot fully naked nor bare her nipples.

After making brief appearances in Miracles (1989) and The Inspector Wears Skirts 2 (神勇飛虎霸王花, 1989), Yip scored a breakthrough role with Erotic Ghost Story (1990). This was a Category III film where she played a fox spirit aiming to seduce the protagonist scholar. She became one of the most popular actresses in Hong Kong and many other parts of Asia in the early 1990s.

In 1991, she portrayed Sister Har in Queen of the Underworld, in which a woman climbed from the lowest depths of society to become the celebrated queen of nightlife in 1960s and 1970s Hong Kong.

She retired from acting in 1997.

== Public image ==
Yip is described as a sex symbol by the press. A 1990 article by the South China Morning Post directly attributed her success to her figure, stating that "her 36-inch [92cm] bust has certainly carried her publicity."

== Personal life ==
In 1990, Peter K. L. Chan, a vice-president for Bank of America, was sent to prison for 27 months for trying to fraudulently transfer $2.37 million USD into Yip's bank account. According to the Associated Press, Chan had told police that Yip was his girlfriend, and that he had committed fraud in an attempt to fund her lifestyle. Yip denied dating Chan, stating that the two were only friends.

Yip's long term boyfriend was the orthopedics surgeon Dr. Sammy Sek Chiu Lui (呂錫照); the pair met in 1992. Numerous rumours have surfaced over the years about Yip marrying Lui, and being pregnant. In an interview in early 2006 with an East Weekly reporter, who spotted Yip walking her dog at Repulse Bay, she said she was in a steady relationship with her boyfriend of more than 15 years and had no intention of getting married or having children. She added she had food and beverage businesses set up in Hong Kong and Macau that kept her busy and occupied.

When asked if she would consider a comeback into the film business, Yip flatly rejected the idea, saying that she was very happy with her carefree lifestyle and had no desire of returning to filming long hours and traveling intensively for movies and record publicity. She also said that she is content with not showing her breasts to make a living.

In May 2018, an English language book detailing her career in movies and television was released. Her boyfriend Lui died of a heart attack while flying to the United States in November 2018.

== Cultural influence ==
One of Yip's nicknames, "Boba" (Chinese: 波霸; Jyutping: bo1 baa3, slang for a woman with big breasts), was adopted as the name of the tapioca pearls in Taiwanese bubble tea during the 1980s.

Nam Kee Pau, a baozi chain in Singapore, sells a large steamed bun named the Amy Yip Big Pau after the actress' bust size.

She has garnered a cult following for the numerous films that she starred in.

== Filmography ==
=== Film ===
Year	Title
1988	Who is The Craftiest 奸人本色
1988	Heart to Hearts 三人世界
1988	China Heat 霸王花之中華警花
1989	The Inspector Wears Skirts 2 神勇飛虎霸王花
1989	Miracles 奇蹟
1989	Mr. Sunshine 开心巨无霸
1989	Lost Souls 富貴開心鬼
1989	Ghost Fever 鬼媾人
1990	Jail House Eros 監獄不設防
1990	Erotic Ghost Story 聊齋艷譚
1990	Look Out, Officer! 師兄撞鬼
1990	Doctor's Heart 救命宣言
1990	My Neighbours are Phantoms 嘩鬼住正隔籬
1990	Mortuary Blues 屍家重地
1990	Raid On Royal Casino Marine 霸王花第三集皇家賭船
1990	She Shoots Straight 皇家女將
1990	Legend of the Dragon 龍的傳人
1990	Ghostly Vixen 天師捉姦
1990	To Spy with Love 小心間諜
1991	The Blue Jean Monster 著牛仔褲的鍾馗
1991	Queen of the Underworld 夜生活女王霞姐傳奇
1991	Magnificent Scoundrels 情聖
1991	Great Pretenders 千王
1991	Robotrix 女機械人
1991	Lethal Contact 龍貓燒鬚
1991	Erotic Ghost Story 2 聊齋艷譚續集五通神
1991	Easy Money 老表發錢寒
1991	Vampire Kids 殭屍福星仔
1991	To Be Number One 跛豪
1991	Sex and Zen 玉蒲團之偷情寶鑑
1992	China Dolls 妓女警察
1992	The Prince of Temple Street 廟街十二少
1992	Requital 五湖四海
1992	Stooges in Hong Kong 不文騷
1994	Underground Judgement 地下裁決
