= Blood Stained Tradewinds =

1990 Hong Kong film by Chor Yuen

- Film poster
- Traditional Chinese: 血在風上
- Simplified Chinese: 血在风上
- Hanyu Pinyin: Xuè Zài Fēng Shàng
- Jyutping: Hyut3 Zoi6 Fung1 Seong6
- Directed by: Chor Yuen
- Screenplay by: Philip Cheng
- Produced by: Chen Kuan-tai; Leung Man-yee
- Starring: Waise Lee; Idy Chan; Alex Fong; Carrie Ng
- Cinematography: Lee San-yip
- Edited by: Yu Siu-fung
- Music by: Richard Lo
- Production companies: J&J Films
- Distributed by: Golden Princess Amusement
- Release date: 7 December 1990
- Running time: 98 minutes
- Country: Hong Kong
- Language: Cantonese
- Box office: HK$1,815,249

Blood Stained Tradewinds is a 1990 Hong Kong action film directed by Chor Yuen and starring Waise Lee, Idy Chan, Alex Fong and Carrie Ng.

== Plot ==
Sing (Alex Fong) and Hung (Waise Lee) grew up in a triad gang where they developed a great relationship with Uncle Lung's (Pau Fong) daughter Sophia (Idy Chan). Due to his old age and sickness, Lung decides to choose Sing as his successor. However, Sing refuses the offer and is kicked out of the gang. In his place, Lung chooses Hung as his successor and also arranges his marriage to Sophia.

Although Hung is now gang leader, he is unable to convince others to follow him due to his aggressiveness. At the same time, the Japanese yakuza attacks him. Meanwhile, Sing, who is now employed by a firecracker factory, has married Fong (Carrie Ng) and settled down to a peaceful life with her. However, a rival gang forces Sing to return to the underworld. The gang kills Lung and kidnaps Sophia triggering a massive gang war.

== Cast ==
- Waise Lee as Hung
- Idy Chan as Sophia Chow
- Alex Fong as Chan Chi-sing
- Carrie Ng as Fong
- Ng Man-tat as Uncle Tat
- Lo Lieh as Brother Ming
- Chen Kuan-tai as Arms buyer
- Stanley Fung as Drunk
- Pau Fong as Uncle Lung
- Ng Yuen-jun as Gutsy Chao
- Ricky Wong as Wai
- Lam Wai as Sung Poon
- Andrew Chan
- Tang Cheung as Chung Yee Gang Lieutenant
- Chan Chi-hung as Chung Yee Gang Lieutenant
- Tam Wai-man as Ming's thug
- Kuk Hin-chiu as Ming's thug
- Yee Tin-hung as Ming's thug
- Lam Chi-tai as Ming's thug
- Lee Fat-yuen as Ming's thug
- Cheung Kwok-wah as Ming's thug
- Choi Kwok-keung
- Fei Kin
- Jack Wong
- Chung Wing
- Chang Sing-kwong
- Lam Foo-wai
- Wong Chi-ming
- Lee Yiu-king
- Lau Shung-fung
- Kong Chuen
- Ho Wing-cheung
- Yiu Man-kei
- Ho Hon-chau
- Choi Kwok-ping
- Chan Wai-to
- Ma Yuk-sing

== Box office ==
The film grossed HK$1,815,249 at the Hong Kong box office during its theatrical run from 7 to 14 December 1990 in Hong Kong, and was released on DVD 16 January 2007.

== Reception ==
DVD Talk offered that while this is a Chor Yuen film, it is not one to watch in order to best know the work of Yuen, as the film would not give a viewer a look into the director's vision, just as watching Jack does not allow insights into the brilliance of Francis Ford Coppola. After leaving the Shaw Bros., Yuen was working under constraints different from his earlier films. "Despite a decent cast and an okay script, Chor Yuen doesnt seem to muster much inventiveness of energy into the picture, so the result is a pretty paint by numbers entry into the gangsters and guns genre. [sic]"
