= Lam Ngai Kai =

Hong Kong film director and cinematographer

Lam Ngai Kai (藍乃才), a.k.a. Lam Nai Choi, Nam Nai Choi, Simon Nam (born 1953), is a Hong Kong–based cinematographer and film director. In the West he is mainly known for his overtly violent movie Story of Ricky.

== Film career ==
Lam joined the Shaw Brothers studio at a young age as a junior worker. Years later he was promoted to the camera department as focus puller. From that position he moved up to become a cinematographer. As a cinematographer he worked with a number of renowned directors, mainly with Sun Chung with whom he worked on films such as The Drug Connection (1976), Big Bad Sis (1976), The Proud Youth (1978) and The Avenging Eagle (1978). Lam worked as a cinematographer for seven years and was regarded as one of the best of his trade at the Shaw Brothers studio. Despite the encouragement of the studio, as well as the persuasion of such landmark talent as Tsui Hark and Sammo Hung, Lam refused to become a director until star actor Danny Lee invited him to co-direct One Way Only (1981), which became the first directorial work for each of them.

Lam’s first film as solo director was the crime drama Brothers from the Walled City (1982), which he followed with an even more refined and progressive urban thriller Men from the Gutter (1983), both produced by Shaw Brothers. Even though Lam is not considered part of the Hong Kong New Wave of the turn of the 1970s and 1980s, these two films display an identical approach to the films of say Dennis Yu or Johnny Mak. The only difference is that Lam was not an auteur in the classical sense, meaning he was the director and cinematographer of the films, but not the author of the script. Nevertheless, Brothers from the Walled City and Men from the Gutter, just like the contemporary New Wave films, combine popular genres with personal drama, their characters and conflicts are grounded in the everyday social reality of Hong Kong and they were filmed on actual locations, not just in a studio.

In 1984 Lam directed the comedy Three Stooges Go Undercover, which was written by Wong Jing, who is also credited as the author of the original story of One Way Only. Lam’s cooperation with Wong, who later became one of the most influential writers and producers in Hong Kong cinema, continued with shooting Wong’s two directorial projects Prince Charming (1984) and The Flying Mr. B (1985). In 1985 both Lam and Wong left Shaw Brothers for Golden Harvest where they continued their collaboration with Ghost Snatchers (1986) and The Seventh Curse (1986). Both films written by Wong Jing, the first one with him in a starring role and the second produced by him, these films marked a new direction in Lam’s career.

Golden Harvest became Lam's household studio for the rest of his career and Lam became their specialist director for films with mechanical and optical special effects. In 1987 Lam directed Killer's Nocturne, an epic revenge drama set in the gambling milieu of old Shanghai and written by Manfred Wong, the later writer and producer behind the immensely popular Young and Dangerous series. In 1988 Lam set the ground for the CAT III exploitation boom with his rape and revenge movie Her Vengeance. Another milestone in his filmography is the historical erotic comedy with fantasy elements Erotic Ghost Story (1990), which again started the whole stream of erotic films with historical/fantasy settings such as Sex and Zen (1991). At the same time Lam directed two spectacular adaptations of Makoto Ogino’s manga series Spirit Warrior – Peacock King (1988) and Saga of the Phoenix (1990) starring Yuen Biao and Gloria Yip.

Lam’s most notorious film is his 1991 over-the-top gore movie Story of Ricky. Meticulously true to its source material, this adaptation of the violent manga Riki-Oh by Masahiko Takajo and Tetsuya Saruwatari combines both recent trends in Lam's filmography – high concept adaptations of Japanese comics and hyper-violent exploitation films abundant with bodily fluids. Even though the film later gained a huge cult status in the West, in its day it did not do so well in the local cinemas. It grossed only HK$2,147,778, whereas Lam’s previous films for Golden Harvest usually grossed around 8 to 10 million HK$. Lam’s last film to date is The Cat (1992), an hallucinatory mixture of action, horror, comedy and science fiction.

== Critical analysis and recurring themes ==
Combining low-brow comedy with elements of action, adventure and even horror, Lam Ngai Kai’s films starting with Ghost Snatchers are a prime example of Hong Kong cinema as a cinema of attractions as described by film scholar Tom Gunning and further examined in film studies all over the world. Gunning’s analysis sees the main principle of early cinema as “exhibitionist confrontation rather than diegetic absorption” and can be expanded not just to experimental cinema but also to certain trends in commercial cinema. Hong Kong films are a prime example of a cinema where narration is secondary to a constant stream of attractions.

Because of their sensational focus on the body and its functions, deformations and mortality, the majority of Lam’s movies for Golden Harvest, can be interpreted using Mikhail Bakhtin’s concept of grotesque realism and the grotesque body.

Some of Lam’s films, especially Ghost Snatchers, Her Vengeance and The Cat, can be seen as part of the stream of Hong Kong films reinterpreting the anxieties and turmoil in Hong Kong prior to its handover to China. Like many other films of that time, including all sorts of CAT III exploitation films but also mainstream titles like John Woo’s Hard Boiled (1992), feature regular Hong Kong citizens suddenly facing an heartless evil force threatening their way of life and their very existence. Especially The Cat directly mentions the fateful year 1997.

French critic Xavier Desbarats has repeatedly compared Lam's work with that of Edward D. Wood, Jr.

== Filmography as director ==
- One Way Only (1981) (co-directed with Danny Lee)
- Brothers from the Walled City (1982)
- Men from the Gutter (1983)
- The Ghost Snatchers (1986)
- Three Stooges Go Undercover (1984)
- The Seventh Curse (1986)
- Killer's Nocturne (1987)
- Her Vengeance (1988)
- Peacock King (1988)
- Erotic Ghost Story (1990)
- Saga of the Phoenix (1990)
- Story of Ricky (1991) (credited as Simon Nam)
- The Cat (1992)

== Filmography as cinematographer ==
- Carry on Con Men (1975)
- The Drug Connection (1976)
- Big Bad Sis (1976)
- Homicides - The Criminals, Part II (1976)
- Judgement of an Assassin (1977)
- Assault - The Criminals, Part IV (1977)
- Cobra Girl (1977)
- The Avenging Eagle (1978)
- The Proud Youth (1978)
- The Deadly Breaking Sword (1979)
- The Kung Fu Instructor (1979)
- To Kill a Mastermind (1979)
- Rendezvous with Death (1980)
- The Kid with a Tattoo (1980)
- One Way Only (1981)
- Mobfix Patrol (1981)
- My Rebellious Son (1982)
- Brothers from the Walled City (1982)
- Men from the Gutter (1983)
- Prince Charming (1984)
- The Flying Mr. B (1985)
- Killer's Nocturne (1987)
- Erotic Ghost Story (1990)
