= Shadow Cop =

1993 Hong Kong film by Albert Lai

- Film poster
- Traditional Chinese: 神探乾濕褸
- Simplified Chinese: 神探干湿褛
- Hanyu Pinyin: Shén Tàn Gān Shī Lǚ
- Jyutping: San4 Taam3 Gon1 Sap1 Lau1
- Directed by: Albert Lai
- Screenplay by: Ella Chan
- Produced by: Cheung Po-wing; Cheung Wai-shing
- Starring: Waise Lee; Carina Lau
- Cinematography: Stephen Poon
- Edited by: Cheng Keung
- Music by: Johnny Yeung
- Production company: New Treasurer Film
- Distributed by: Newport Entertainment
- Release date: 8 January 1993
- Running time: 91 minutes
- Country: Hong Kong
- Language: Cantonese
- Box office: HK$1,060,863

Shadow Cop is a 1993 Hong Kong action comedy film directed by Albert Lai and starring Waise Lee and Carina Lau. Lee plays a cop who becomes a ghost after being killed in a car wreck and eventually discovers the truth behind his death.

== Plot ==
While posing undercover in a drug bust operation in Volvo Club, Anti-Narcotic Unit Sergeant Chiu Kai-hung (Waise Lee) gets drunk to keep his cover. After his superior officer and godfather, Officer Fong (Kenneth Tsang) leads his squad to arrest the drug dealers and collapses on the streets and ends up on the same taxi as a drunk hostess, Witty (Carina Lau), who works in the same nightclub. The taxi drivers carries the two, who have passed out, into Kai-hung's home and bedroom. When they wake up, Witty thinks they had sex and demands HK$2000 from Kai-hung despite knowing he is a cop and takes his television and VCR. In another operation to bust drug lord, Master Tai (Chen Kuan-tai), Kai-hung encounters Witty again, who accidentally blows Kai-hung's cover, and Tai's gang chases and shoots the two before Fong brings his squad to arrest Tai. Witty injures her leg from jumping off a high platform and Kai-hung takes care of her. Some time later, Kai-hung and Witty have become a couple and are co-habiting.

Kai-hung takes part in another operation with his new partner Mang Sam (Ben Lam) to arrest drug dealer Maddie, (Shing Fui-On) at the Containers Terminal, but Maddie's gang shoots at the two. Sam fights Maddie's henchmen while Kai-hung takes the engages in a car chase with Maddie to catch him, but Kai-hung's car was hit by a truck. Kai-hung comes out but his colleagues ignore him, only to see them carry his body out of his car and realizes he has died and became a ghost. When Witty finds out Kai-hung died at the hospital, she breaks down and admits her love for him as his spirit watches behind her. Witty is then harassed by Maddie to give back HK$10 million (prepared by the government for the bust) that Kai-hung snatched from him and she reports it Kai-hung's colleagues, so Sam and Fat (Chung Fat) were assigned to protect her. At the police station, Kai-hung meets another ghost, Ko (David Wu), who was killed by his cheating wife and lover, who teaches Kai-hung to use supernatural powers and informs him in 49 days, he must find a body to reincarnate or he will cease to exist.

Witty and Sam later encounter Maddie and the latter manages to arrest him. However, Fat later finds a suspicious $200 bill in the register of the police station canteen where his wife works. The police accountant announces the HK$10 million has vanished without suspicion but Fat tells Sam what he found and Fat was later pushed into a fire while burning offerings for Kai-hung. Witty is horrified after witnessing it and Sam tries to molest her while comforting her. The next day, Kai-hung follows Sam and discovers the latter the behind his and Fat's death, and Fong was also conspiring with Sam for the HK$10 million.

Kai-hung, who have been trying to get attention, realizes she can talk to Witty's friend, Eva (Angile Leung), who is a spirit channeller and tells her to report to the police, but Sam and Fong stops her. Kai-hung instructs Eva to take the HK$10 million from Sam's locker in a bowling alley and mail it to his own home to give it Witty. Witty then witnesses Sam pushing Fong off the building after a deal gone wrong and once she receives the money, she gives it up to in order to have Sam arrested and avenge Kai-hung who is touched by Witty's action before it was time for him to reincarnate. Some time later, while helping a blind man cross the street, Witty encounters a man who looks exactly like Kai-hung and is thrilled to joy before kissing.

== Cast ==
- Waise Lee as Chiu Kai-hung (趙繼雄), an undercover sergeant or the Anti-Narcotic Unit of the Royal Hong Kong Police Force who becomes a ghost after being killed in a car wreck.
- Carina Lau as Witty (暈暈哋), an abrasive, materialistic, but kind hostess of Volvo Club (大富豪) who becomes Kai-hung's girlfriend and eventually sacrifices money for love.
- Ben Lam as Mang Sam (孟深), inspector of the Anti-Narcotic Unit trained in England who is the culprit behind Kai-hung's death and scheming the take HK$10 million of government funds for himself.
- Angile Leung as Eva, Witty's friend who is a hostess of Volvo Club's 28th Group who has the ability to channel spirits and can communicate with Kai-hung but cannot see him.
- Chung Fat as Fat (阿發), a sergeant of the Anti-Narcotic Unit and Kai-hung's colleague and best friend.
- Shing Fui-On as Maddie (大傻), a drug dealer who sold HK$10 million worth of cocaine to Kai-hung and Sam in a trade where the two were to bust him.
- Kenneth Tsang as Officer Fong (方Sir), Kai-hung's superior officer and godfather who conspires with Sam to obtain the HK$10 million cash.
- Chen Kuan-tai as Master Tai (泰爺), a drug dealer who trades with Kai-hung in Volvo Club before arrested by Fong's squad.
- David Wu as Ko (高佬), a ghost who Kai-hung meets who was killed by his cheating wife and lover, teaches Kai-hung to use supernatural powers by avenging his own death as well as informing him he must find a body to reincarnate in 49 days.
- Eliza Yue as Fat's wife who works at the register of the police station's canteen.
- Charlie Cho as the lover of Ko's wife.
- Mai Kei as Brother Ben (Ben哥), a drug dealer Kai-hung busts in the former's mansion.
- Gabriel Wong as a taxi driver who drives Kai-hung and Witty and carries them up to the former's home while they were drunk.
- Billy Ching as Billy (Billy仔), Kai-hung's colleague who was undercover with him while busting Ben.
- Jo Jo Ngan as Witty's friend who is a hostess at Volvo Club.
- Debbie Cheung
- Cho Seung-wan as Officer Fong's wife.
- Ng Man-choi as a blind man whom Witty helps cross the street.
- Albert Lai
- Poon Chuen-tak as Kai-hung's colleague.
- Edith Au as Ko's wife who is then killed by her dead husband.
- Kingdom Yuen
- Kam Piu
- Lee Man-kuen
- Lam Hoi-chin
- Cheng Yam-chiu
- Wong Wa-shing as Kai-hung's neighbor who lives above his flat.
- Mole Yin-seung
- Chow Hong-chiu as an Aunt (姑媽), man beaten by Sam at the bowling alley while chasing Witty.
- Kei Ho-chiu
- Hui Sze-man as Kai-hung's neighbor who lives a floor above his flat.
- Ng Kwok-kin as the police accountant.
- Yu Ngai as Hui Kwok-on (許國安), inspector of the ICAC's Special Operation Unit.
- Lung Ying as Maddie's henchman.
- Choi Kwok-ping as Maddie's henchman.

== Theme song ==
- Song: People Revolve by Following the Mortal World (人隨塵俗轉)
  - Composer: Johnny Yeung
  - Lyricst/Singer: Oman Mui

== Reception ==
=== Box office ===
The film grossed HK$1,060,863 at the Hong Kong box office during its theatrical run from 8 to 13 January 1993.

=== Critical reception ===
In his book, The Hong Kong Filmography, 1977–1997: A Reference Guide to 1,100 Films Produced by British Hong Kong Studios, John Charles gave the film a s score of 4/10 and states the film's change to supernatural theme midway keeps the film interesting but criticizes the film's attempt at humor.
