= Great Pretenders (film) =

1991 Hong Kong film by Ronny Yu

- Film poster
- Traditional Chinese: 千王
- Simplified Chinese: 千王
- Hanyu Pinyin: Qiān Wáng
- Jyutping: Cin1 Wong4
- Directed by: Ronny Yu
- Screenplay by: Raymond Wong
- Produced by: Clifton Ko
- Starring: Raymond Wong; Tony Leung; Simon Yam; Amy Yip
- Cinematography: Sander Lee
- Edited by: Ronny Yu
- Music by: Lam Manyee
- Production companies: Mandarin Films; Ko Chi Sum Productions
- Distributed by: Golden Princess Amusement
- Release date: 16 May 1991
- Running time: 95 minutes
- Country: Hong Kong
- Language: Cantonese
- Box office: HK$4.3 million

Great Pretenders (Chinese: 千王) is a 1991 Hong Kong comedy film edited and directed by Ronny Yu and starring Raymond Wong, Tony Leung, Simon Yam and Amy Yip.

== Plot ==
Taiwanese swindler Mr. Giant (Teddy Robin) loses in a poker match against Hong Kong swindler Wong Seung-chin (Raymond Wong) and they become sworn enemies. Meanwhile, Wong's apprentice Snake Wai (Tony Leung) meets Susan (Lok Wai), a widow who has recently returned to Hong Kong from Singapore. Planning to con a large sum of money from her, Wai sets up a plan with his acquaintances Yam Sai-sung (Simon Yam) and Yip Mei-mei (Amy Yip). However, Susan turns out to be swindler as well. Unable to salvage a fortune from Susan, Wai, Sung and Mei become indebted to her. In desperation, Wai seeks help from his mentor who wins back all the debts they owed Susan. Susan then becomes acquainted with Wong and his apprentices and they work together to swindle profiteer Lung Cho-tin (Leung Tin). They able to acquire HK$2 million form Lung very easily. Not wishing to be cheated, Lung hires Mr. Giant to battle against Wong.

== Cast ==
- Raymond Wong Pak-ming as Wong Seung-chin
- Tony Leung Chiu-Wai as Snake Wai
- Simon Yam as Yam Sai-sung
- Amy Yip as Yip Mei-mei
- Leung Tin as Lung Choi-tin
- Teddy Robin as Mr. Giant
- Lok Wai as Susan So
- So Hiu-lam as Susan's fat brother
- Lee Lung-kei as Cunning Kei
- Cho Chai as Wing
- Gabriel Wong as Beauty contest emcee
- Ronny Yu as Beauty contest judge
- Law Ching-ho as Victim of Wai's watch scam
- Yeung Wan-king as Lost watch owner
- Tsui Kwong-lam as Butcher playing mahjong
- Chu Yat-hung as Housewife playing mahjong
- Garry Chan as Drunk man outside hotel
- Benz Kong as Card dealer
- Joanna Chan as Monica
- Chan Chi-hung as Superintendent Lee
- Lau Leung-fat as Jewelry appraiser
- Yip Wing-hung
- Paul Cheung
- Tony Chow
- Lam Yim-fung
- Liu Sou-bing
- Woo Kwan-hung
- James Ha as Tin's thug
- Lai Sing-kwong as Tin's thug
- Jameson Lai as Tan's thug
- Chan Tat-kwong as Tan's thug
- Christoper Chan as Tan's thug
- Pinky Cheung as Li Li-li
- Nicky Li as Drunk man hit by car
- Ng Kwok-kin as Police officer
- Hui Si-man as Rich widow
- Lam Kwok-git

== Theme song ==
The theme song of the film is Only Remembering the Old Deep Love (只記舊情重) composed by Joseph Koo with lyrics by Thomas Tang sung by Liza Wang.

== Reception ==
=== Critical ===
Andrew Chan of the Film Critics Circle of Australia gave the film a score of 2/10 and wrote "The Great Pretenders is by no means a good movie. In fact, it is terrible and hard to finish…" Hong Kong Film Net gave the film a score a 6/10 and wrote "The Great Pretenders certainly isn't an example of great cinema from Hong Kong, but it is good enough to set aside ninety minutes of your life for, especially if you're a fan of the actors involved."

=== Box office ===
The film grossed HK$4,333,406 at the Hong Kong box office during its theatrical run from 16 to 28 May 1991 in Hong Kong.
