= Brothers from the Walled City =

1982 Hong Kong film by Lam Ngai Kai

- DVD cover
- 城寨出來者
- Directed by: Lam Ngai Kai
- Written by: The Shaw Brothers Creative Group
- Produced by: Mona Fong
- Starring: Chin Siu-ho; Philip Ko Fei; Johnny Wang Lung Wei; Liu Lai-Ling; Wong Ching
- Cinematography: Lan Nai-Tsai; Tsao An-Sung
- Edited by: Chiu Cheuk Man; Ma Chung Yiu; Yu Shao Feng
- Music by: Shing Chin Yung; Su Chen-hou
- Production company: Shaw Brothers Studio
- Release date: 1 September 1982 (Hong Kong)
- Running time: 89 minutes
- Country: Hong Kong
- Language: Cantonese
- Box office: HK$4.04 million

Brothers from the Walled City
- Traditional Chinese: 城寨出來者
- Simplified Chinese: 城寨出来者
Transcriptions
Standard Mandarin
- Hanyu Pinyin: chéng zhài chū lái zhě
Yue: Cantonese
- Jyutping: seng^{4} zaai^{6} ceot^{1} loi^{4} ze^{2}

Brothers from the Walled City (Chinese: 城寨出來者; pinyin: Chéng Zhài chū lái zhě) is a 1982 Hong Kong film directed by Lam Ngai Kai and produced by the Shaw Brothers Studio. It stars Chin Siu-ho, Philip Ko Fei and Johnny Wang Lung Wei.

== Cast ==
- Chin Siu-ho as Xiao De
- Philip Ko Fei as Da De
  - Lee Kim-Chung as Young Da De
- Johnny Wang Lung Wei as Officer Cheung
- Liu Lai-Ling as Cheung Mei Ling
- Wong Ching as Yi Ching
- Kwan Hoi-san as Chan Yuan Loong
- Gam Biu as Biu, Club Manager
- Pak Man Biu as Ninth Uncle
- Soh Hang-suen as Mei Ling's Mother
- Lung Tin Sang as Xiao De's Friend
- Lee Diy-Yue as Xiao De's Friend
- Yeung Wai-Sin as Girlfriend of Xiao De's Friend
- Fung Ging-man as Uncle Jiu
- Hui Ying-Ying as Mamasan
- Tony Leung Hung-Wah as Addict Shing
- Wong Mei-Mei as Addict Shing's Wife
- Wan Seung-Lam as Da De's Gang Member
- Lam Chi-Tai as Da De's Gang Member
- Kong Long as Loong's Gambling House Guard
- Fong Ping as Woman on the Street
- Chui Kin-Wa
- Ha Wai-Hong
- Luk Ying-Hong as Police Sergeant
- Ng Kwok-Kin as Policeman
- Yat Boon-Chai as Policeman
- Leung Hung as Drug Addict
- Tang Wing-Siu
- Tam Wai-Man

== See also ==
- Kowloon Walled City
