= The Cat (1992 film) =

1992 Hong Kong film by Lam Ngai Kai

- Theatrical release poster

Chinese name
- Traditional Chinese: 衛斯理之老貓
- Simplified Chinese: 卫斯理之老猫
Transcriptions
Standard Mandarin
- Hanyu Pinyin: Wèisīlǐ Zhī Lǎomāo
Yue: Cantonese
- Jyutping: Wai⁶si¹lei² Zi¹ Lou²maau¹
- Directed by: Lam Ngai Kai
- Screenplay by: Chan Hing-ka; Gordon Chan
- Based on: Old Cat by Ni Kuang
- Produced by: Chua Lam; Michael Lai
- Starring: Waise Lee; Christine Ng; Gloria Yip
- Cinematography: Mak Hoi-man
- Edited by: Keung Chuen-tak; Peter Cheung
- Music by: Philip Chan
- Production companies: Golden Harvest; Paragon Films
- Distributed by: Golden Harvest
- Release date: 22 October 1992
- Running time: 84 minutes
- Country: Hong Kong
- Language: Cantonese
- Box office: HK$2,733,592

The Cat (Chinese: 衛斯理之老貓; pinyin: Wèisīlǐ Zhī Lǎomāo; lit. 'Wisely's Old Cat'), also known as The 1000 Years Cat, is a 1992 Hong Kong science-fiction action film directed by Lam Ngai Kai, based on the novel Old Cat, an installment of the Wisely Series, by Ni Kuang. Produced by Golden Harvest and Paragon Films, the film stars Waise Lee, Christine Ng, and Gloria Yip. Its plot follows a trio of extraterrestrials, one of whom has the form of a cat, who team up with a novelist named Wisely to fight a malevolent alien that can possess humans.

== Plot ==
Li Tung is awoken in the middle of the night by the sounds of his upstairs neighbor hammering something. He confronts his neighbor and sees a girl holding a cat inside his neighbor's apartment. The next day, Tung sees the neighbor, the girl, and the cat departing in a moving van. Tung enters the neighbor's now-empty apartment, where he sees piles of newspaper on the floor, some of them bloodied. He lifts the papers and discovers a set of organs, prompting him to notify the police. When the police investigate, they determine the organs to be fresh cat intestines.

Later, Tung has dinner with police inspector Wang Chieh-Mei, adventure novelist Wisely, and Wisely's partner Pai So. Wisely later writes that he is convinced that the girl and her cat are from another star. At a museum, an octagonal artifact unidentified by archaeologists is stolen by the girl, the cat, and the girl's knight Errol, who know the artifact to be a weapon. A large, fungus-like monster surging with electricity bursts into the museum, attacking and killing museum guards while the girl, the cat, and Errol escape. A curious Wisely learns of the girl's new address and sneaks into their house.

Inside, Wisely overhears the girl telling the cat that they must find a second octagon in order to defeat "the star killer" and return home. The cat alerts the girl to Wisely's presence and scratches him, after which Errol knocks Wisely unconscious. Errol suggests they destroy him, but the girl refuses. When he awakes, Wisely finds no trace of his attackers. Some time later, Wisely and Pai So learn about the theft of the octagon from the museum. Upon visiting the crime scene, Wisely sees that the area is covered in scorch marks, and finds cat hair.

Wisely and Wang borrow a dog named Lao Pu from a man named Chen, intending on using the dog to track down the cat. Wang and four other police officers are attacked by the fungal monster, which takes control of their bodies. A possessed Wang acquires firearms from a group of criminals, killing the criminals when they demand he pay for the weapons, and showing himself immune to their gunfire in the process.

At the location of the second octagon, Wisely and others witness the cat stealing the artifact, and flying through the air as he escapes. Lao Pu tracks the cat to a junkyard, where the cat severely injures Lao Pu. Wisely nearly apprehends the cat, but he flees, leaving behind a severed portion of his tail. At a hospital, Chen takes Lao Pu home, and Wisely learns from a bone analysis that the cat the tail belonged to died many years prior.

The cat, whom the alien girl calls "the General", enters Wisely and Pai So's home, wanting his tail back. The girl and Errol follow, and confirm to Wisely and Pai So that they are extraterrestrials. The tail reattaches itself to the General. Wang appears outside, and begins firing bullets into the house. Wisely retaliates by throwing Molotov cocktails, but Wang is unharmed. Wang follows Wisely to the roof, where Wisely electrocutes him. Wang falls off the roof, and Errol sets himself on fire and jumps onto Wang. Wisely, Pai So, and the girl drive with the General to an observatory, where the girl uses a telescope to locate her home star. Her distant home sends a beam of light down to the observatory, radiating the General's body and making him "the strongest knight in the universe".

Wisely, the girl, and the General drive to a building where they encounter the fungal monster. The monster forces them up to the roof, where the General, holding the completed octagon in his jaws, flies into the monster's mouth, destroying it from the inside and causing it to explode into a glittering substance. The girl and the General use the substance to transport themselves home. Later, Pai So arrives with police. A reporter follows, but Wisely declines to provide her with a story, saying instead that she can read about the events in his next novel.

== Cast ==
- Waise Lee as Wisely
- Christine Ng as Pai So
- Gloria Yip as Alien Girl
- Lau Siu-ming as Errol
- Lawrence Lau as Li Tung
- Philip Kwok as Wang Chieh-Mei
- Ni Kuang as Mr. Chen
- Wan Seung-lam as One of Wang's Men
- Kong Long as Gun Dealer / One of Wang's Men
- Chua Lam as Professor Yu
- Chui Kin-wah as Gun Dealer
- Simon Cheung as Policeman
- Liang Chiang as Policeman

== Critical reception ==
Author John Charles, in his 2000 book The Hong Kong Filmography, 1977-1997, gave The Cat a score of nine out of ten stars.

== See also ==
- Films and television series adapted from the Wisely Series:
  - The Seventh Curse, a 1986 Hong Kong film starring Chow Yun-fat as Wisely
  - The Legend of Wisely, a 1987 Hong Kong film starring Sam Hui as Wisely
  - The New Adventures of Wisely, a 1998 Singaporean television series starring Michael Tao as Wisely
  - The Wesley's Mysterious File, a 2002 Hong Kong film starring Andy Lau as Wisely
  - The 'W' Files, a 2003 Hong Kong television series starring Gallen Lo as Wisely
