= Robotrix =

1991 Hong Kong film by Jamie Luk Kin-ming

- Directed by: Jamie Luk Kin-ming
- Written by: Jamie Luk; So Man-Sing
- Produced by: Henry Chan
- Starring: Amy Yip; David Wu; Chikako Aoyama; Chung Lin; Billy Chow; Hui Hsiao-dan
- Cinematography: Jim Yeung
- Edited by: Peter Cheung; Ng Wang Hung
- Music by: Jim Yeung; Siu Hung Yeung
- Production companies: Golden Harvest; Paragon Films Ltd.
- Distributed by: Golden Harvest
- Release date: 31 May 1991 (Hong Kong)
- Running time: 97 minutes
- Country: Hong Kong
- Language: Cantonese
- Box office: HK$5,486,008 (Hong Kong)

Robotrix (Chinese 女机械人 pinyin: nǚ jīxièrén "Woman Robot") is a 1991 Hong Kong science fiction exploitation film directed by Jamie Luk Kin-ming and produced by the Golden Harvest Company. It features Amy Yip, David Wu, Chikako Aoyama, Billy Chow, and Hui Hsiao-dan.

The plot concerns a female police officer who is gunned down, only to have her mind transferred into a robotic clone.

== Plot ==
A criminally insane scientist, Ryuichi Yamamoto (Chung Lin), transfers his mind into a robot body (Billy Chow) and kidnaps an Arabian prince in order to extort money from the prince's father, which will allow him to build a legion of robots. A female police officer, Selena Lin (Chikako Aoyama), is killed trying to save the prince.

Due to her exemplary skills as a policewoman, scientist Dr. Sara (Hui Hsiao-dan) transfers Selena's mind into a robot named Eve-27, which also replicates her physical human form. She returns to work, her colleagues and her policeman boyfriend Chou (David Wu) unaware of her death and resurrection as a robot. Selena, Dr. Sara, and Sara's robotic assistant Ann (Amy Yip) join a police taskforce led by Chou to find the prince and Yamamoto by investigating the murders of a number of prostitutes that the scientist has raped and killed. After Selena makes love with Chou, Ann also becomes curious about sex and the police use her to go undercover at a brothel. Chou later discovers Sara repairing Selena, revealing to him her robotic nature; despite Selena's pleas, Chou decides to end their relationship.

Eventually the team captures Yamamoto and brings him to Sara's lab; however he breaks free and rapes Dr. Sara. Ann and Chou rescue Sara while Selena fights Yamamoto, but he defeats and deactivates her with an electric drill and escapes. Ann and Chou track Yamamoto to a junkyard, where he is holding the prince captive. They work together to trap Yamamoto in a crushing machine, before the now-freed prince drops a shipping container on his head, killing him.

Afterwards, Dr. Sara and Ann are commended for their help, while Chou has to deal with a repaired Selena, whose memories have been restored but has been left unaware that she is a robot.

== Cast ==
- Amy Yip – Ann
- David Wu – Chou
- Chikako Aoyama – Selena Lin/Eve-27
- Billy Chow – Ryuichi Yamamoto's robot
- Chung Lin – Ryuichi Yamamoto
- Hui Hsiao-dan – Doctor Sara
- Ng Kin-chung – Puppy
- Bowie Wu – Police Commissioner
- Lee Hin-Ming – Informer Hui

== Production ==
Bill Lui, the winner of the 23rd Hong Kong Film Awards (Best Art Direction), is the Art Director of this film.

Cast member Vincent Lyn said of the film, "Now that was one wild shoot. The cast and crew were all over the place and you were lucky to find out what you were doing before the cameras rolled. I spent more time laughing on the set than anything else."

== Release ==
=== Home media ===
This film was first released on Blu-ray Disc on March 27, 2020. Then on November 11, 2024, online boutique movie store Shoutfactory released a Blu-Ray Disc of “Robotrix” as a part of its Golden Harvest compilation release called “Golden Harvest Vol. 1 Supernatural Shockers.”

== Reception ==
=== Box office ===
The film grossed HK$5,486,008 at the Hong Kong box office during its theatrical run from 31 May to 13 June 1991 in Hong Kong.

=== Legacy ===
This erotic R-rated thriller is notable for a Hong Kong film on general release in featuring frequent female full-frontal nudity, and is particularly notable for a scene of brief full-frontal male nudity (of Hong Kong Chinese actor Billy Chow, playing the robot version of Japanese scientist Ryuichi Yamamoto), as it is perhaps the first time in Hong Kong cinema that a Chinese adult male's genitals have been fully revealed on camera in a film for general release. It was also perhaps notable for leading the way in Hong Kong category 3 martial arts films. The idea of mind uploading as well as some cult elements inside the film make Robotrix become a science fiction film classic in Hong Kong.

== See also ==
- List of Hong Kong films of 1991
- Nudity in film (East Asian cinema since 1929)
