= Erotic Ghost Story =

1990 Hong Kong film by Lam Ngai Kai

- Film's intertitle
- Directed by: Lam Ngai Kai
- Produced by: Chan Dung Chow
- Starring: Amy Yip; So Man
- Cinematography: Lam Ngai Kai
- Production company: Golden Harvest Company
- Distributed by: Golden Harvest Company
- Release date: 19 May 1990 (Hong Kong)
- Running time: 90 minutes
- Country: Hong Kong
- Language: Cantonese

Erotic Ghost Story (Chinese: 聊齋艷譚; pinyin: Liáo zhāi yàn tán) is a "Category III" rated Hong Kong erotic film. Directed by Lam Ngai Kai and starring Amy Yip, So Man, Hitomi Kudo and Manfred Wong, it was released in 1990.

The film became a box office success in Hong Kong, and three sequels, Erotic Ghost Story II, Erotic Ghost Story III, and Erotic Ghost Story: Perfect Match were released in 1991, 1992 and 1997 respectively.

The film incorporates themes from Pu Songling's Strange Tales from a Chinese Studio and its story is largely influenced by The Witches of Eastwick.

== Plot ==
Three sworn fox spirit sisters, Pai So-So, Hua-Hua and Fei-Fei, arrive in the human world and take on the form of three young attractive women to seek perfection; after 36 days they will be able to permanently shed their animal forms and become immortal, but Pai So-So warns her sisters that monsters, both real and imagined, can disrupt the process.

At a temple, Pai So-So admires the multi-headed statue of Wutung, the deity of fertility, but a passing Taoist priest, aware of her true identity, warns her that lustful thoughts for Wutung will bring her misfortune as a fox spirit. Pai So-So scares the priest away with her magic, but he tells her to find him if she needs his help. The three sisters settle into a countryside villa, drawing the suspicion of their neighbours Mr. and Mrs. Wang.

While praying, Hua-Hua and Fei-Fei have romantic visions of a young man, and later that night Hua-Hua finds Fei-Fei masturbating in the villa's hot springs. They have sex with each other, which worries a spying Pai So-So. The next day, Pai So-So rescues a young scholar, who resembles the man in her sisters' visions, from bandits and brings him home to his decrepit shack in the woods. She cleans up the shack with her magic, and promises to return every other day to help him with housework. Noticing her unexplained absences, Fei-Fei follows Pai So-So to the scholar's shack. She spies on him washing himself but is caught and scolded by the scholar; she tells Hua-Hua about her ordeal, leading Hua-Hua to attack the scholar with a sword. During the struggle, lustful thoughts overcome both and they have sex. Fei-Fei returns to the scholar to apologise for her sister's actions, and she ends up seducing him. Later, during a visit to the scholar, Pai So-So discovers Fei-Fei's hairpin; when he tries to explain she also seduces him. After the three sisters realise that they all have slept with the scholar, he invites himself to stay at the sisters' villa and continues a relationship with all three of them.

After Mr. and Mrs. Wang catch the sisters bathing naked with the scholar, Pai So-So tells him that he should return to live in his shack. Back there, the scholar rapidly ages and he uses magic to lure a young woman to his home. The sisters awake one morning to find fur having grown on their chests; Pai So-So realises the scholar must have been draining their magic. They go to his shack and see him turn into Wutung and devour the young woman, restoring his youth. Pai So-So seeks the Taoist priest for help; he tells them to make a voodoo doll to hurt him. Wutung is injured by the doll but is able to make his way to the sisters' villa, where he resists their magic and uses his own to bring them under his control. The Taoist priest arrives, breaking Wutung's hold over the sisters and destroys him. The sisters thank the priest for saving their lives before he leaves.

== Cast ==
- Amy Yip - Hua-Hua
- Man So - Pai So-So
- Hitomi Kudo - Fei-Fei
- Ha Chia Ling - The scholar
- Manfred Wong - Mr. Wang
- Ha Chi Chun - Mrs. Wang
- Lam Chung - Hsuan Kuei
- Sin Lap-Man - Wu Ming

== Production ==
Later becoming known as a sex symbol, Erotic Ghost Story was actress Amy Yip's first erotic Category III film, though not her first film for Golden Harvest. Yip was obligated to star in the film but due to a clause in her contract with the studio that stated that she would not be shot fully naked, Yip's erotic scenes were filmed using clever camera angles and body doubles.
