= Ni Kuang =

Hong Kong writer (1935–2022)

- Chinese: 倪匡
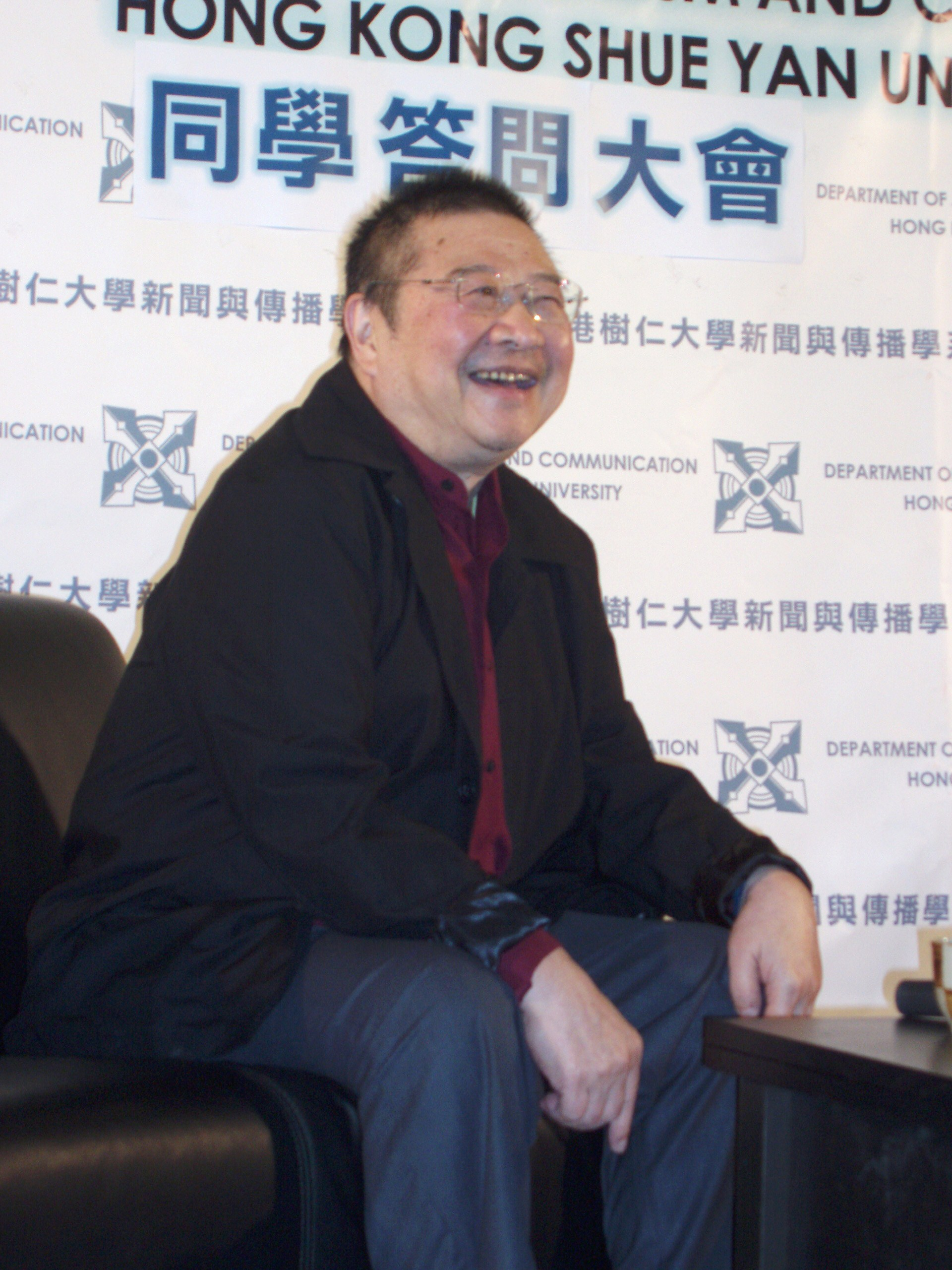
- Ni at Hong Kong Shue Yan University in 2007
- Born: Ni Cong; 30 May 1935; Shanghai, Republic of China
- Died: 3 July 2022 (aged 87); Wong Chuk Hang, Hong Kong, China
- Occupations: Novelist, screenwriter, actor
- Spouse: Li Guozhen (m. 1959)
- Children: Ni Sui (daughter); Joe Nieh (son)
- Writing career
- Period: 1956–2005
- Genres: Wuxia, science fiction

Chinese name
- Chinese: 倪匡
Transcriptions
Standard Mandarin
- Hanyu Pinyin: Ní Kuāng
Yue: Cantonese
- Jyutping: Ngai4 Hong1

Ni Cong (birth name)
- Traditional Chinese: 倪聰
- Simplified Chinese: 倪聪
Transcriptions
Standard Mandarin
- Hanyu Pinyin: Ní Cōng
Yue: Cantonese
- Jyutping: Ngai4 Cung1

Yiming (courtesy name)
- Chinese: 亦明
Transcriptions
Standard Mandarin
- Hanyu Pinyin: Yìmíng
Yue: Cantonese
- Jyutping: Jik6-ming4

Ni Kuang (Chinese: 倪匡; (Note: Also romanised Ngai Hong, I Kuang and Yi Kuang),) born Ni Cong [simplified Chinese: 倪聪; traditional Chinese: 倪聰]; 30 May 1935 – 3 July 2022), courtesy name Yiming, was a Hong Kong novelist and screenwriter. He was known as a highly-prolific author of wuxia and science fiction stories, reportedly penning over 300 Chinese-language novels, and more than 400 film scripts. He was considered one of the three major figures of the wuxia genre, alongside Jin Yong and Gu Long, and has been described as "a giant of Chinese literature."

== Early years ==
Ni was born on 30 May 1935, in Shanghai, China, to a family of intellectuals. He was the fourth child out of seven, and one of his younger siblings is novelist Yi Shu. His parents, who worked as insurance agents, left Shanghai for British Hong Kong in 1950 with his three younger siblings, although Ni and his three older siblings remained in mainland China. In 1951, at the age of 16, he joined the People's Liberation Army, and was employed as a security officer by Jiangsu provincial public security department in 1952 after receiving training at East China People's Revolution University. In 1955, he volunteered to be assigned to Jalaid Banner, a region in Hulun Buir, Inner Mongolia, as a guard of a local laogai camp.

=== Arrival in Hong Kong ===
In 1956, Ni was sentenced to ten years' imprisonment as a counter-revolutionary after he was charged for destruction of public property. Ni claims that he removed wooden planks off a bridge with other soldiers and burned them to keep warm in the winter, and he escaped because he thought he would receive a death sentence after his dog bit the commanding officer who frequently targeted him because of his outspokenness against the political system. In mid-May 1956, Ni fled Inner Mongolia and first went to Anshan to stay with his older brother Ni Yifang, an engineer and a member of the Chinese Communist Party. He left a month later and returned to Shanghai, where his remaining family members paid a human smuggler for him to travel to Hong Kong. Ni arrived in Kowloon on 5 July 1957, having passed through Guangzhou and Portuguese Macau. Since then, Ni had never set foot in mainland China.

== Writing career ==
Ni's science fiction novels usually take the form of detective/mystery stories featuring extraterrestrial life as a deus ex machina to explain the impossible and implausible. His best known works are the Wisely Series (Wai See-lei 衛斯理) and Dr Yuen (Yuen Chun-hap 原振俠) novel series, both of which have been adapted into films and television series. His criticism of communism is evident in some of these works.

Ni also co-wrote scripts with Chang Cheh for the Shaw Brothers Studio, including for the films One-Armed Swordsman, The Assassin and Crippled Avengers. As the screenwriter for the 1972 film Fist of Fury, he did not receive credit for creating the protagonist, Chen Zhen, who was played by Bruce Lee. The credits listed director Lo Wei as author. Chen Zhen became a popular Chinese culture hero and the subject of numerous remakes and adaptations of Fist of Fury. Notable actors such as Jet Li and Donnie Yen have portrayed Chen Zhen on screen after Bruce Lee. Ni wrote the screenplay for China's first superhero film Inframan.He also wrote scripts for the third largest movie conglomerate in the 1970s, Goldig Films (owned by Alex Gouw), including Lang Wen in 1975. Gouw was a movie producer and never a director.

Ni was a friend and fan of the wuxia writer Louis Cha. He wrote at least one extended segment in Cha's novel Demi-Gods and Semi-Devils when Cha was on holiday in Europe, although much of his additions were excised in Cha's first revision. Ni, while helping Cha write nearly 40 days of serialisation while Cha was abroad, made A'zi, a character in Demi-Gods and Semi-Devils that he didn't like blind in the story. Cha had gone through a lot of trouble to revert this event in his novel afterwards.

In 1992, Ni immigrated to the United States and settled in San Francisco, where he continued his writing career and became a naturalized United States citizen. However, he remigrated to Hong Kong in 2006 because his wife could not adjust to the lifestyle in the United States.

== Personal life ==
Ni was a Protestant Christian convert from Buddhism. He was baptized in 1986 at Lin Shun South Road Church in Taipei.

Ni had four brothers and two sisters: Ni Yifang (倪亦方), Ni Yixiu (倪亦秀), Ni Yijian (倪亦儉), Ni Yiping (倪亦平), Isabel Nee (倪亦舒) and Ni Yijing (倪亦靖). He was married to Li Guozhen (李果珍) in 1959, while his younger brother, Ni Yiping, was married to Li's younger sister.

Ni and Li Guozhen had a son and daughter. Their daughter is Ni Sui (倪穗). Their son, Joe Nieh (倪震), works in the Hong Kong entertainment industry and is married to actress Vivian Chow in 2009.

=== Political views ===
Ni was a known anti-communist. In an interview, when asked about his feelings regarding injustice in China, he stated that the people would continue suffering as long as the Chinese Communist Party remains in existence. He mentioned that the most important value in the world was individual freedom, which includes respecting others' personal freedom as well.

== Death ==
Ni died of complications from skin cancer at a cancer rehabilitation center in Hong Kong on 3 July 2022 at the age of 87.

== Filmography ==
=== Films and Television ===
This is a partial list of films and television shows.

- 1967 One-Armed Swordsman – Screenwriter.
- 1969 The Invincible Fist – Writer
- 1975 Disciples of Shaolin – Writer
- 1975 Lang Wan - Writer, produced by Goldig Films, Hong Kong's 3rd largest movie producer in the 1970s founded by Indonesian–Chinese tycoon Alex Gouw
- 1979 Writing Kung Fu – Writer
- 1983 Heroic Ones - Writer, produced by Goldig Films, Hong Kong's 3rd largest movie producer in the 1970s founded by Indonesian-Chinese tycoon Alex Gouw
- 1986 The Seventh Curse – Dr Yi. The film is an adaptation of author Ni Kuang's Dr. Yuen series of novels.
- The Legend of Wisely, a 1987 Hong Kong film starring Samuel Hui as Wisely
- 1988 Profiles of Pleasure – Yi
- The Cat (1992 film), a 1992 Hong Kong film starring Waise Lee as Wisely
- The New Adventures of Wisely, a 1998 Singaporean television series starring Michael Tao as Wisely
- The Wesley's Mysterious File, a 2002 Hong Kong film starring Andy Lau as Wisely
- The 'W' Files, a 2003 Hong Kong television series starring Gallen Lo as Wisely

== Works ==
This is a partial list of books:

- Wisely Series
- Dr Yuen Series
- The Asian Eagle Lo Hoi series
- Magnolia, the Lady in Black series
- Teenage Wisely Series
