= Waise Lee =

Hong Kong actor

- 李子雄
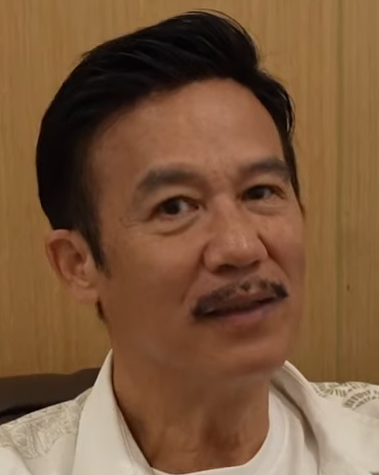
- Lee in June 2025
- Born: 19 December 1959 (age 66); British Hong Kong
- Occupation: Actor
- Spouses: Angela Fong Hiu-hung (divorced) Wang Yaqi (m. 2010)
- Children: Jasper Lee (son); Kyle Lee (son)

Chinese name
- Chinese: 李子雄
Transcriptions
Standard Mandarin
- Hanyu Pinyin: Lǐ Zǐxióng
Yue: Cantonese
- Jyutping: Lei5 Zi2-hung4

Waise Lee Chi-hung (born 19 December 1959) is a Hong Kong film and television actor best known for playing the roles of villains and antagonists in various films.

== Biography ==
Lee graduated from TVB's Artist Training Academy in 1982. He was in the same class as Tony Leung Chiu-Wai and Francis Ng. He started acting in Hong Kong films in the 1980s and became famous for his role as the antagonist Tam Shing in John Woo's 1986 film A Better Tomorrow. From that time on Lee made appeared in several films, including A Chinese Ghost Story II (1990), To Be Number One (1991), Powerful Four (1992). He also played the leading roles in The Big Heat (1988), Bullet in the Head (1990) and The Cat.

Lee is best known on television for his roles in television series produced by TVB, such as Mind Our Own Business (1993), Cold Blood Warm Heart (1996), Burning Flame (1998) and A Step into the Past (2001). Starting around 2001, Lee made less appearances in TVB's television dramas. That year, he starred in To Where He Belongs, a television series produced by TVB's rival ATV. He has also been more active in working on mainland Chinese television series since the late ‘00s.

== Personal life ==
Lee was first married to a fellow Hong Kong actress Angela Fong Hiu-hung, after which they moved to Toronto, Canada where they had a son, Jasper, in 1994. Lee and Fong later divorced. In 2010, Lee married a mainland Chinese actress Wang Yaqi (王雅琦), who is of Hui descent. Their son, Kyle, was born in June 2018.

== Filmography ==
Film
Year	Title	Role	Notes	Ref.
1986	A Better Tomorrow	Tam Shing		
1988	The Diary of a Big Man 大丈夫日記	Lee Chi-hung		
1988	The Big Heat	John Wong Wai-pong		
1988	Gunmen	Captain Cheung		
1988	Fury 情義心	Chou Chi-to		
1989	Deception 驚魂記	Inspector Li		
1990	Story of Kennedy Town	Chuang Peng		
1990	A Chinese Ghost Story II	Fu		
1990	Bullet in the Head	Paul		
1990	Song of the Exile	Mr. Cheung		
1990	Stage Door Johnny 舞台姊妹	Lu Tung-tong		
1990	Blood Stained Tradewinds	Xiong		
1990	Spy Games 中日南北和	Lee		
1991	The Royal Scoundrel	Inspector Lee Nam		
1991	Her Fatal Ways II 表姐,妳好野!續集	Wu Hsiung		
1991	To Be Number One	Chan Dai-man		
1991	Tricky Brains	Macky Kam		
1991	The Roar of the Vietnamese 越青	Tian San		
1991	Inspector Pink Dragon	Inspector Shih Ching		
1991	Forbidden Arsenal 地下兵工廠	Chen Aoqun		
1991	His Fatal Ways 老表,你好野!	Hung		
1991	A Chinese Ghost Story III			
1991	Center Stage	Lai Man-Wai		
1992	The Cat	Wisely		
1992	Swordsman II	Hattori		
1992	Direct Line 踩過界	Gao Shen		
1992	Fatal Chase 執法威龍			
1992	Devil's Love 性奴			
1992	Misty 霧都情仇			
1992	Girls Without Tomorrow 1992	Dr. Peter Yeung		
1992	Zen of Sword 俠女傳奇			
1992	Powerful Four 四大探長	Yiu Hung		
1992	Mountain Warriors 沙丘戰士			
1993	Shadow Cop	Chiu Kai-hung		
1993	The Incorruptible 李洛夫奇案	Lee Choi-fat		
1993	He Ain't Heavy, He's My Father	Lee Kar-shing		
1993	First Shot	Faucet Lui Tai-chiu		
1993	Angel the Kickboxer 縱橫天下	Lee Chi-hung		
1993	A Serious Shock! Yes Madam! 末路狂花	Brother Boy		
1993	Murders Made to Order 蠍子之滅殺行動	Shih Lung		
1993	The Avenging Quartet 霸海紅英			
1993	Lady Supercop 女兒當自強	Edmond		
1993	Pink Bomb 人生得意衰盡歡	Graham		
1993	The 13 Cold-Blooded Eagles 新冷血十三鷹	Shima Yufeng (Red Eagle)		
1993	The Black Morning Glory 疊影驚情	Officer Tso Wing		
1994	A Taste of Killing and Romance 殺手的童話	Inspector Tung Fai		
1994	Underground Judgement 地下裁決	Chau		
1994	Wing Chun 詠春	Scholar Wong Hok-chow		
1995	Tough Beauty and the Sloppy Slop 怒海威龍	Roy		
1995	Daughter of Killer			
1995	Red Zone 爆炸令	Wong Wai-hung		
1995	Angel on Fire 喋血柔情	Inspector Lee		
1995	Tomorrow 明日天涯			
1996	Hu-Du-Men 虎度門	Lung		
1997	A Queer Story 基佬40			
1997	Task Force 熱血最強	Triad Boss		
1997	Super Cops 伙頭大將軍			
1998	The Lord of Hangzhou 杭州王爺	Gon Lung		
1998	The Conman 賭俠1999	Handsome		
1999	Running Out of Time 暗戰	Baldy		
2000	Freaking Spicy Killer 麻辣至尊			
2000	Life Played a Joke on Me 生命的愚弄			
2001	Believer of Frighten 魔鬼使徒			
2002	Return from the Other World 賭神之神	Mr. Gao		
2002	Inner Senses 異度空間	Wilson Chan		
2002	Cut Off Game 玩盡殺絕			
2003	Infernal Affairs III 無間道III:終極無間	Sergeant Chan Chun		
2003	The Runner 逃犯	Mr. Tsui		
2003	Dirty Man 陰司路之色中餓鬼			
2004	Fearful 24 Hours 古宅魅影	Lawyer Areca		
2004	Men in a Blue Mood 三個男人故事	Wong Lui		
2004	Promise to the Killers 殺手的諾言			
2005	Crazy n' the City 神經俠侶	S.P. Chan		
2005	Oh, My Wife! 老婆萬歲			
2006	The Wild Ninja 終極忍者	Brian		
2007	The First of August 八月一日			
2009	Overheard	Ringo Low		
2010	My Belle Boss 我的美女老闆			
2011	The Aroma City 芳香之城傳奇			
2011	The Road of Exploring 湘江北去			
2012	High Kickers			
2012	The Four	Prince		
2012	An Inaccurate Memoir			
2013	7 Assassins			
2013	The Four II	Prince		
2014	The Four III	Prince		
2014	The Summer of Our Graduation			
2015	The Buried Secret			
2016	Cold War 2	Edward Lai		
2016	League of Gods	Dragon King of the East Sea		
2017	Colour of the Game			
2019	Business on WeChat			
2019	The Business Storm of Ruhai			

Television
Year	Title	Role	Notes	Ref.
Unconfirmed	Laopo Daren Julebu 老婆大人俱樂部	Hua Hongming		
1990	水鄉危情	Cheung Shun-fung		
1990	Friends and Lovers 又是冤家又聚頭	Lee Chun-chung		
1990	天涯路客	Wu Siu-tin	Television film	
1991	特警90之明日天涯	Ko Fai	Television film	
1993	Mind Our Own Business 開心華之里	Yeung Tso-kai		
1995	The Condor Heroes 95	Luk Chin-yuen		
1995	Corruption Doesn't Pay	Cheuk Ming		
1996	Cold Blood Warm Heart	Yip Wing-cheung		
1997	Qianqiu Jiaguo Meng 千丘家國夢	Qian Chuan		
1998	Burning Flame	Lok Hiu-fung		
1999	Justice Sung II 狀王宋世傑（貳）	Prince Gong		
2000	Lost in Love 大囍之家	Lin Tin-lok		
2000	War of the Genders	Herman Wong		
2001	A Step into the Past	Chiu Muk		
2001	To Where He Belongs 縱橫天下	Lui Lok-tin		
2001	信仰	Song Changhe / Song Jianshe		
2001	致命遺產	Peng Yawei		
2001	雄心密令	Nie Ying		
2003	亞洲英雄	Tin Kwok-tung		
2004	Twin of Brothers	Yu-man Fa-kup		
2004	The Last Breakthrough	Tsai Ka-sheung		
2005	The Academy	Chung Chi-wah		
2005	恩仇劫	Xu Yong	Television film	
2006	夢回清河	Ma Langdang		
2006	2路電車	Inspector Hu		
2006	畫鳥記	Li Mian	Television film	
2007	Survivor's Law II	Tsui Ching-ping		
2007	父子神探之千年咒	Chen Hengli	Television film series	
2008	鳳穿牡丹	Huo Wanhong		
2008	蒼海一粟	Jiang Huaizhong		
2008	神奇2008	Ouyang Jianren		
2008	緊急時刻		Television film	
2009	秋霜			
2010	孫子大傳	Fugai		
2010	還看今朝	Shi Baiqing		
2010	Tezhan Xianfeng 特戰先鋒	Sentian		
2010	梨花淚			
2011	All Men Are Brothers	Gao Qiu		
2011	菩提樹下	2nd Master Long		
2011	菊花醉	Li Zhong		
2014	Black Heart White Soul	Henry To		
2015	The Cage of Love 抓住彩虹的男人			
2018	Watch Out, Boss	L.K. 宋禮勤		
TBA	天下鹽商	Ye Youtian		
TBA	冷風暴	Yi Anzhi		
2018	Ever Night	King of Yan		
