= Business Jump =

Japanese manga magazine

- Cover of the 21st/22nd combined and last issue of Business Jump, published by Shueisha on October 5, 2011
- Editor: Shueisha
- Categories: Seinen manga
- Frequency: Monthly (July 1985–February 1986); Biweekly (March 1986–October 5, 2011)
- Circulation: 240,000 (2011)
- Publisher: Shueisha
- First issue: July, 1985
- Final issue: October 5, 2011
- Company: Shueisha
- Country: Japan
- Based in: Tokyo
- Language: Japanese
- Website: Official website (archived)

Business Jump (Japanese: ビジネスジャンプ, Hepburn: Bijinesu Janpu), was a Japanese seinen manga anthology published by Shueisha under the Jump line of magazines. The manga of Business Jump were published under the "Young Jump Comics" line. This magazine's mascot was an anthropomorphic, Western-style mouse illustrated by Susumu Matsushita.

== History ==
The magazine debuted in July 1985 as the first "salaryman" magazine to be published by Shueisha. Business Jump was one of its kind in the Jump family of manga magazines. Readers were typically young, twenty-something business men. Business Jump was originally a monthly publication before going biweekly.

The magazine was discontinued in late 2011, with a final double issue, numbered 21/22, released on October 5. Several ongoing series were folded into a new publication, Grand Jump.

== Serializations ==
=== 1980s ===
- Ippon Bōchō Mantarō (一本包丁満太郎) (1985–1996)
- Riki-Oh (力王, Riki-Ō) by Masahiko Takajo and Tetsuya Saruwatari (1987–1990)
- Ikenai Boy (イケナイBOY) by Yoshihiro Suma (1987–1990)
- Hakatafū Kumo Roku (博多風雲録) by Hikari Kasuga (1989–1990)

=== 1990s ===
- Amai Seikatsu (甘い生活) by Hikaru Yuzuki (1990–2011)
- Ōkushon Hausu (オークション・ハウス) by Kazuo Koike and Kanō Seisaku (1990–2003)
- The Hard (ザ・ハード) by Tetsuya Watari (1990–1996)
- Battle Angel Alita / Gunnm (銃夢, Ganmu) by Yukito Kishiro (1990–1995)
- Natsuki Crisis (なつきクライシス) by Hiroshi Tsuruta (1991–1997)
- Bokuha Mini ni Koishi Teru (僕はミニに恋してる) by Nonki Miyasu (1992–1993)
- Tokini Habara no Niau Shōjo Noyōni (時には薔薇の似合う少女のように) by Shiosu Nakashima (1992–1997)
- Usshī Tono Hibi (ウッシーとの日々) by Jirō Hataman (1993–1999)
- Noside (ノーサイド, Nōsaido) by Fumiharu Ikeda (1994–1996)
- If I See You in My Dreams (夢で逢えたら, Yume de Aetara) by Noriyuki Yamahana (1994–1999)
- Women by Mio Murao (1995–2000)
- Abare Bunya (あばれブン屋) by Tetsuya Saruwatari (1996–2001)
- Sing "Yesterday" for Me (イエスタデイをうたって, Iesutadei o Utatte) by Kei Toume (1997–2011)
- Bar Raimu Raito (BAR来夢来人) by Fumiharu Ikeda (1997–2002)
- One Outs by Shinobu Kaitani (1998–2006)
- Keishi Sōkan Asami (警視総監アサミ) by Masayuki Kondō and Teruto Ariga (1999–2006)
- Kakko Kabu ((株)〜かっこかぶ〜) by Denki Watanabe (1999–2005)

=== 2000s–2011 ===
- The Summit of the Gods (神々の山嶺, Kamigami no Itadaki) by Jiro Taniguchi (2000–2003)
- Otoko no Jikan (男の時間) by Mio Murao (2001–2004)
- Urami ya Honpo (怨み屋本舗) by Masanao Kurihara (2001–2007)
- P Joshiryō no Neko Dear (P女子寮のネコである) by Chinatsu Tomisawa (2002–2007)
- Senumi no Tsurugi: Shitō (戦海の剣－死闘) by Shun Amanuma (2002–2004)
- Tōdori Nozaki Shūhei (監査役野崎修平) by Ryōka Shū and Shigeru Noda (2003–2007)
- Onidō Ryūtarō • Sono Iki Sama (鬼堂龍太郎・その生き様) by Keīchi Tanaka (2004–2006)
- Shimane no Bengoshi (島根の弁護士) by Tetsuo Aoki (2004–2008)
- Jōō (嬢王) by Ryō Kurashina and Nao Kurebayashi (2004–2008)
- Orange Yane no Chiisana Ie (オレンジ屋根の小さな家) by Noriyuki Yamahana (2005–2008)
- Monkīpīpuru (モンキーピープル) by Eishō Shaku (2005–2007)
- Kurenai Kabe Tora (紅壁虎) by Atsuji Yamamoto (2005–2007)
- Sakura 2 Gō (桜2号) by Takewo Takeyama (2005–2006)
- Nosuto Ichiban Hoshi (ホスト一番星) by Dragon Odawara (2005–2007)
- Gabai: Saga Nogabaibā-chan (佐賀のがばいばあちゃん) by Yoshichi Shimada and Saburō Ishikawa (2005–2010)
- Yoshihara no Mirai-san (吉原のMIRAIさん) by Shō Makura and Mari Masatoshi (2005–2006)
- Kannō Shōsetsuka (官能小説家) by Mio Murao (2005–2006)
- Labrador Wada Radio (ラブラドール・和田ラヂヲ, Raburadōru Wada Radjiwo) by Radio Wada (2005–2011)
- Teki (手騎-テキ-) by Hiromi Yamasaki (2005–2007)
- Ōnin K (殴人K) by Masaru Miyazaki and Tsuyoshi Adachi (2005–2006)
- Shī-Dragon (シードラゴン) by Sig Production, Shōji Kanemaru (2006)
- Hiru Made Netarō (昼まで寝太郎) by Hiroshi Motomiya (2006–2008)
- Seigi no Tobira (セイギのトビラ) by Tsukasa Yamaguchi (2006–2007)
- Tantei Jimusho 5 (探偵事務所5) by Tomihiko Tokunaga and Kenichi Kiriki (2006)
- Swing-style by Toshiki Yui (2006–2007)
- Mitsurin Shōnen: Jungle Boy (密林少年~ジャングル・ボーイ~) by Aki Ra and Akira Fukaya (2006–2007)
- Kizudarake no Jinsei (傷だらけの仁清) by Tetsuya Saruwatari (2006–2011)
- Sommelière (ソムリエール, Somuriēru) by Araki Joh and Katsunori Matsui (2006–2011)
- Yoni mo Kimyō na Man-Gatarō (世にも奇妙な漫☆画太郎) by Man-Gatarō (2007–2009)
- Harenchi Gakuen: The Company (ハレンチ学園 〜ザ・カンパニー〜, Harenchi Gakuen ~ Za Kanpanī) by Gō Nagai and Teruto Ariga (2007–2008)
- Tracker Okayamitoma (TRACKER 大神冬馬) by Yōzaburō Kanari and Rokku Noma (2007–2008)
- Dr. Morohashi Kenji (Dr.検事モロハシ) by Shigeru Noda (2007–2008)
- Reinōryokusha Odagiri Kyōko no Uso (霊能力者 小田霧響子の嘘) by Shinobu Kaitani (2007–2011)
- Sakurada Familia (桜田ファミリア) by Dragon Odawara (2007–2008)
- Monokurō Mujietto (モノクロームジェット) by Kazuhiro Kumagaya (2007–2008)
- Gendai Bijin Tsuma Zukan (現代美人妻図鑑) by Mio Murao (2007)
- Uramiya Honpo: Sukuruma Fuusuke (怨み屋本舗 巣来間風介) by Masanao Kurihara (2007–2009)
- Bakurei On (爆麗音) by Hiroto Saki and Shutaro Yamada (2007–2009)
- Noeru no Kimochi (ノエルの気持ち) by Noriyuki Yamahana (2008–2010)
- Ōzora Mono (大空者) by Dai Tennōji and Kiryō Inōe (2008)
- Soleil (SOLEIL ～ソレイユ～) by Ryō Kurashina and Nao Kubayashi (2008–2009)
- Kuno Ichi Mahouden (くノ一魔宝伝) by Tsukasa Yamaguchi (2008–2010)
- Barigoku Men (ばりごく麺) by Junichi Nōjō and Endo Hantsu (2008–2009)
- Hansamu Sūtsu (ハンサム★スーツ) by Osamu Suzuki, Seigō Kashida, Teruto Ariga (2008–2009)
- Golden Boy II – Sasurai no O-Benkyō Yarō: Geinō-kai Ōabare-hen (GOLDEN BOY II 〜さすらいのお勉強野郎 芸能界大暴れ編〜) by Tatsuya Egawa (2010–2011)

== Circulation ==
Year(s)	Weekly circulation	Magazine sales (est.)	Sales revenue (est.)	Issue price
1990	700,000	8,400,000	¥1,680,000,000	¥200
1991	720,000	8,640,000	¥1,728,000,000	¥200
1992	730,000	8,760,000	¥1,752,000,000	¥200
1993	750,000	9,000,000	¥1,800,000,000	¥200
1994	760,000	9,120,000	¥1,915,200,000	¥210
1995	740,000	8,880,000	¥1,864,800,000	¥210
1996	740,000	8,880,000	¥1,864,800,000	¥210
1990–1996	637,381	61,680,000	¥12,604,800,000 ($158 million)	¥235
