= Riki-Oh: The Story of Ricky =

1991 Hong Kong film by Lam Nai-choi

- Theatrical release poster
- Directed by: Lam Nai-choi
- Written by: Lam Nai-choi
- Based on: Riki-Oh by: Masahiko Takajo; Tetsuya Saruwatari
- Produced by: Johnathan Chow
- Starring: Fan Siu-wong; Fan Mei-sheng; Ho Ka-kui; Yukari Oshima; Tetsurō Tamba
- Edited by: Peter Cheung; Keung Chuen-tak
- Music by: Philip Chan Fei-lit
- Production companies: Diagonal Pictures; Paragon Films
- Distributed by: Golden Harvest
- Release dates: 5 October 1991 (Japan); 9 April 1992 (Hong Kong)
- Running time: 91 minutes
- Country: Hong Kong
- Language: Cantonese
- Box office: HK$2,147,778

Riki-Oh: The Story of Ricky (Chinese: 力王, also known as Story of Ricky) is a 1991 Hong Kong martial arts splatter film written and directed by Lam Nai-choi, and starring Fan Siu-wong, Fan Mei-sheng (Siu-wong's real life father), Ho Ka-kui, Gloria Yip, Yukari Oshima, and Tetsurō Tamba. It is based on the Japanese manga of the same name by Masahiko Takajo and Tetsuya Saruwatari. It follows the title character (Fan), a young man who has super-human power and fighting abilities, who is held in a dystopian private prison.

A Golden Harvest production, the film premiered in Japan on October 5, 1991 before being released in Hong Kong on April 9, 1992. It also received a limited theatrical release in the United States in 1993. Riki-Oh was the first film to receive a Category III rating (viewers under 18 not allowed) solely for violent content. In the years since its release, the film has developed a cult following for its extremely brutal and highly unrealistic violence, as well as its high camp factor and poor English dubbing.

== Plot ==
In 2001, when all prisons have been privatized, super-strong and durable Ricky Ho is sent to one for manslaughter after killing a crime boss responsible for his girlfriend's death. The prison is divided by cardinal directions, with each wing having a member of the "Four Heavenly Kings" ruling over it. Ricky is placed in the North wing, where he witnesses an inmate named Wildcat disfigure an elderly inmate. Ricky partially blinds Wildcat, who then pays obese inmate Mad Dragon to kill Ricky, while the disfigured inmate commits suicide after Wildcat stops his probation from clearing. Mad Dragon attacks Ricky in the shower, but Ricky kills both Mad Dragon and Wildcat.

Fearing that Ricky may inspire the other prisoners to revolt, the one-eyed Assistant Warden orders the North wing leader Ah-hai to publicly execute him. Hai disembowels himself in shame after Ricky beats him and during the act tries to strangle Ricky with his intestines, forcing Ricky to kill him. The rest of the Gang murder Hai's godson Sa when he refuses to take revenge on Ricky, so Ricky burns their opium farm. The Gang restrains Ricky, but before they can kill him, the Assistant Warden learns that the head Warden is returning from vacation and forces everyone back to their cells. The Assistant Warden floods Ricky's cell with cement, freezing him in place.

The Warden and his spoiled son return and the former interrogates Ricky, but is interrupted when Tai Zan, the East wing leader, bursts through a wall to fight Ricky. Ricky brutalizes Tai Zan, and the Warden tries to crush them both to death under the cell's hydraulic ceiling, though Ricky holds it off in an effort save Tai Zan's life. The Warden shocks him with a taser to make him stop, only for Tai Zan to hold up the ceiling long enough for Ricky to escape before Tai Zan dies. The Warden orders Ricky buried alive for a full week and promises him freedom if he can survive, which he manages to, though the warden still denies him freedom and leaves him chained up in his cell.

An inmate named Freddy sneaks Ricky his food, but a snitch informs the Assistant Warden, who kills Freddy and taunts Ricky with his body. Enraged, Ricky breaks free, kills the snitch, and blinds the Assistant Warden's other eye. The inmates riot and mutilate the Assistant Warden, whom the Warden kills, annoyed with his incompetence. Ricky twists the West wing leader Huang Chung's limbs to neutralize him, while the South wing leader is killed by the Warden when he flees in fear. Having gone too long without his medication, the Warden transforms into a hulking creature whom Ricky barely defeats by shoving him feet-first into a meat grinder.

With the Warden dead, Ricky walks outside to find the guards and inmates still fighting each other. He stops the fight by presenting them with the Warden's severed head, then punches the wall of the prison, collapsing part of it with a single blow. Declaring "you're all free now", he walks through the opening in the wall to freedom.

== Cast ==
- Fan Siu-wong as Ricky Ho (Chinese: 贺力王; Jyutping: Ho^{6} Lik^{6}wong^{4})
- Fan Mei-sheng as Assistant Warden "One-Eyed Snake" (单眼蛇; Daan^{1} Ngaan^{5} Se^{4}, "Dan / Cyclops" in the English dub)
- Ho Ka-kui as the Warden
  - Lam Suet as
    - transformed Warden
    - Samuel's lackey
- Yukari Oshima as Huang Chung (黄泉; Wong^{4} Cyun^{4}; 'Huangshan', "Rogan")
- Tetsurō Tamba as Master Zhang Shan-gui (張善鬼; Zoeng^{1} Sin^{6}gwai^{2})
- Gloria Yip as Keiko (莹莹; Jing^{4}jing^{4}, "Anne")
- Frankie Chan Chi-leung as Ah-hai (呜海; Wu^{1} Hoi^{2}, "Oscar")
- Kōichi Sugisaki as Tai Zan (泰山; Taai^{3} Saan^{1}; 'Mount Tai', "Tarzan")
- Wong Kwai-hung as Bai Shen (白神; Baak^{6} Dan^{4}; 'White God Mountain', "Brandon")
- Chang Gan-wing as Old Ma (老馬; Lou^{5} Maa^{5})
- Power Chan as Sa (阿沙; Aa^{3} Saa^{1})
- Wong Chi-keung as Guan Dao (關刀; Gwaan^{1} Dou^{1})
- Kwok Chun-fung as Guang (阿廣; Aa^{3} Gwong^{2})
- Lam Kai-wing as Wildcat (山貓; Saan^{1}maau^{1}; 'Lynx')
- Chan Ging as Centipede (百足; Baak^{3}zuk^{1})
- Bill Lung-biu as Ye Ming (葉明; Jip^{6} Ming^{4}
- Wong Kwok-leung as Hok, the Warden's son (学; Hok^{6})
- Yuen Wah as Prisoner

== Production ==
18-year-old Fan Siu-wong was an upcoming martial arts actor slowly gaining attention in mainland China and Hong Kong when he was approached by Golden Harvest after finishing filming Stone Age Warriors (1991). He later stated in an interview that he was picked up at the airport by Golden Harvest and immediately offered the main role in Story of Ricky. Fan signed up for the role before researching his part and was shocked when he learned about the graphic violence, initially fearing that it would turn off viewers. He said the role of Ricky is still one of his most memorable and people in rural areas in China will often recognize him from the film and approach him. Fan believed the violence was ultimately the main reason why people still remember the movie and why it is a cult hit among fans.

Fan's father Fan Mei-sheng, himself a veteran martial arts actor, played the Assistant Warden. Much of the film was shot at a real prison located in the Coloane section of Macau.

== Release ==
Riki-Oh received a Category III rating (viewers under 18 not allowed). It was one of the first Hong Kong movies to receive such a rating for non-erotic content. This rating greatly inhibited the film's ability to make money at the box office.

=== Home media ===
In the U.S., Tokyo Shock released Riki-Oh on DVD in 2000 with no bonus features. In 2002, a DVD was released by Hong Kong Legends in Region 2. In 2003, Fortune Star (formerly Mega Star), current holders of the Golden Harvest library from Media Asia, released a remastered version of the film on a three-disc set, along with The Dragon from Russia (1990) and City Hunter (1993).

The film was released on Blu-ray by Media Blasters in 2011. Riki-Oh: The Story of Ricky became available in its original Chinese with hard-coded English subtitles on Netflix's instant streaming service in mid-2012. The film aired on Turner Classic Movies on 2 November 2012 and 14 April 2013 as part of TCM Underground. In the UK, the film was first released on Blu-ray from a new HD restoration by Mediumrare Entertainment in 2015 before going out of print. In 2021, British distributors 88 Films released their own Blu-ray edition of the film with new remastered English subtitles and both Cantonese and English audio tracks.

In November 2023, the movie was released on the Criterion Channel.

== Reception ==
=== Box office ===
The film grossed $2,147,778 HKD in Hong Kong. Despite the box office performance, Fan Siu-wong said that the movie was a major hit in video rental stores, since many kids who were not allowed to view it in theaters could now rent the film and watch it.

=== Critical response ===
On the aggregator site Rotten Tomatoes, Riki-Oh has an approval rating of 90% by 10 reviews, and with an average rating of 7.1/10. Michael Atkinson of The Village Voice called it "a rather astonishing, starkly stylized blood flood set inside a privatized prison." Kurt Ramschissel of Film Threat gave the film 5 stars, saying that "the violence comes fast and furious and is just as outrageous and over-the-top as Sam Raimi or Peter Jackson ever were." J.R. Jones from the Chicago Reader said, "If you can handle the torrent of grisly violence, you'll find yourself royally entertained by this Hong Kong actioner."

== Unofficial sequel ==
An unofficial sequel titled Dint King Inside King (a.k.a. Story of Ricky 2 or Super Powerful Man) was released in Hong Kong in 2005. The film was never released in the United States or in Europe. Fan Siu-wong is again cast in the title role, and wears the camouflage poncho seen in flashbacks and in the manga.
