= Ho Ka-kui =

Hong Kong actor (1948–2015)

William Ho Ka-kui (Chinese: 何家駒; March 14, 1948 – January 27, 2015) was a Hong Kong Chinese actor in the 1970s. He was born in Kowloon City, Hong Kong. Ho acted as a warden No known name in the movie, Riki-Oh: The Story of Ricky, which starred Louis Fan as Riki Oh Saiga. Ho acted in 139 movies from 1976 to 2015. On January 27, 2015, he died in the Hong Kong Health Center of organ failure.

== Early life ==
Ho was born in Kowloon Walled City, Hong Kong, on March 14, 1948. He spent his early life in Kowloon and then his parents sent him to Shanghai, where he began acting with the film company Bang! Bang! Films.
