= Emme Wong =

Hong Kong singer and actress (born 1981)

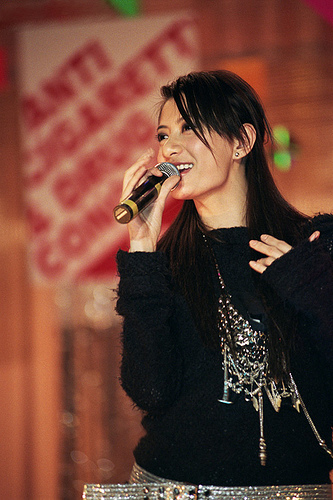
- Wong in 2005
- Born: 3 January 1981 (age 45); Hong Kong
- Occupations: Singer; actress
- Years active: 2001–2009
- Spouse: Danny Chan Kwok-kwan (m. 2014)

Chinese name
- Traditional Chinese: 黃伊汶
- Simplified Chinese: 黄伊汶
Transcriptions
Standard Mandarin
- Hanyu Pinyin: Huáng Yī Wén
Yue: Cantonese
- Jyutping: wong4 ji1 man4
- Musical career
- Also known as: Dior Wong
- Origin: Hong Kong
- Genres: Cantopop
- Instrument: Singing
- Label: Universal Music
- Website: www.umg.com.hk

Emme Wong Yee-Man (Chinese: 黃伊汶; born 3 January 1981) is a Cantopop singer and actress based in Hong Kong.

== Singing career ==
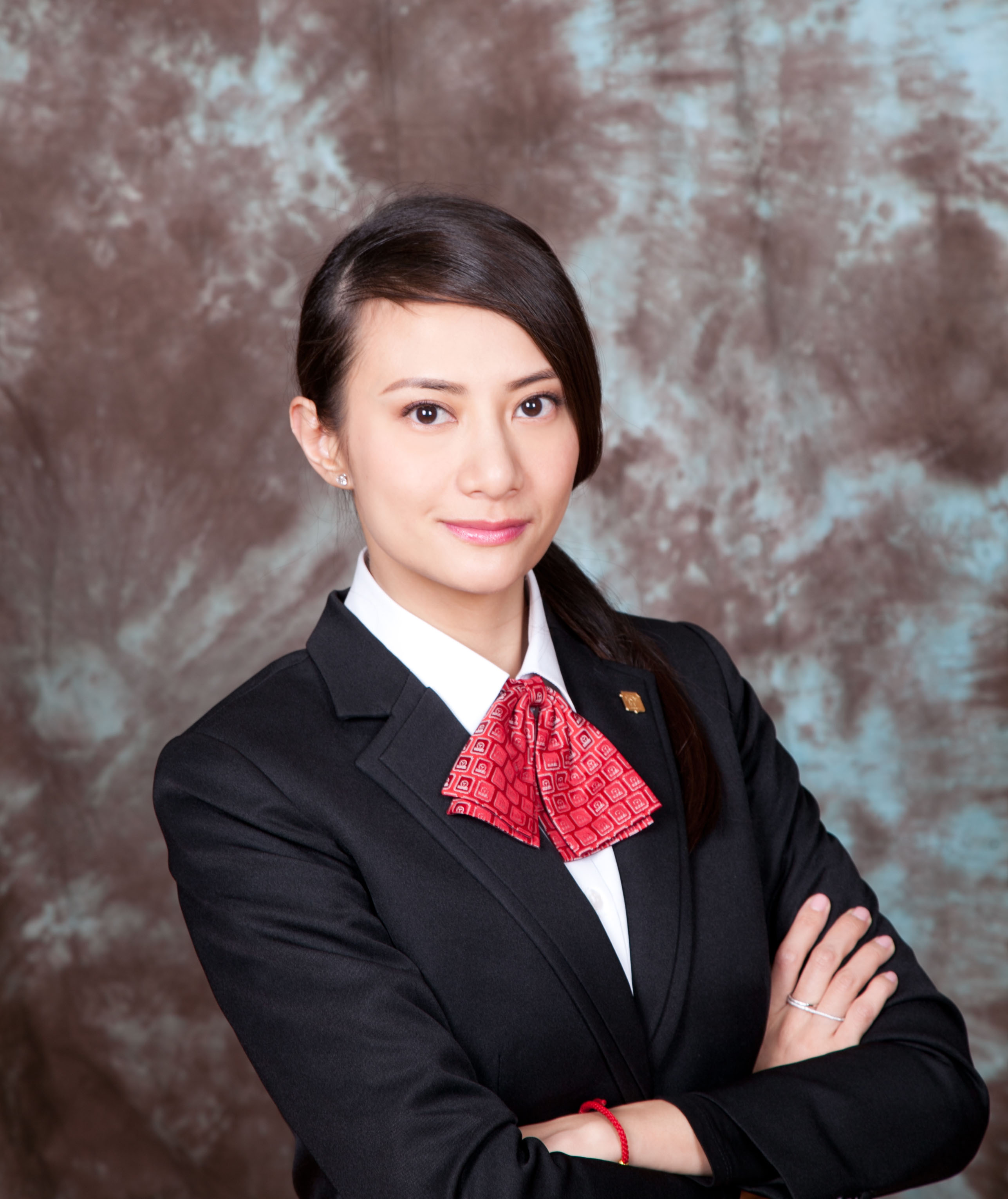
Wong in 2015

Wong originally debuted under the name "Dior Wong" in late 2001, as one of Universal Records's promising new pop starlets. As Dior Wong, she sported a clean and youthful image, and released her first EP Pure Impression (純屬印象) in November. She followed with her first full-length album Scents (香薰) in July 2002.

After a brief hiatus, she changed her name to Emme and returned with her second album (self-titled) in 2003, marked by a new, more mature playgirl image, and uptempo dance tunes which she has been noted for ever since. The subsequent EP Good Show released in 2004 continues in the same vein. She returned in May 2008 with the new dance/electronic single Aspire (渴求), and the album The Groove in Me in August.

Wong has also recorded many Cantonese covers of songs originally sung in English, including "What Took You So Long?" by Emma Bunton (純屬印象), "Round Round" by the Sugababes (戒男), "Show Me Love" by t.A.T.u., and most recently a remixed version of "He Doesn't Love You" by Sarah McLeod (渴求).

Wong has collaborated with a variety of artists, including Masataka Matsutoya, Matsutoya Yumi, Andy Lau, Hacken Lee, and Alan Tam.

== Acting ==
Wong has appeared in multiple films, most notably "Colour of the Loyalty" and "Confession of Pain". She also appeared in the TV dramas "Kung Fu Soccer" and "Magic Chef". events host, advertisements, lyric compositions, and fashion shows etc. In 2006, Emme acted in a national education movie of "A Chinese Fairy Tale" alongside award winning actor Tony Leung Ka Fai.

== Business career ==
Wong began to start a business outside of her artistic career in recent years. She introduced the French watch brand GALTISCOPIO to Hong Kong in 2009, and it was voted as one of the best brands of a famous fashion magazine in Hong Kong within one year. GALTISCOPIO expanded its business to the Chinese market in 2010 and opened new stores in Beijing, Chengdu, Hangzhou and other big cities. In 2011, the company further explored to Taiwan, Malaysia, Singapore and other Asian markets.

To commemorate the fifteenth anniversary of the return of Hong Kong in 2012, Beijing authorities held an election of "Bauhinia Merit". The winners of the election (Wong and 54 other Chinese entrepreneurs) had their biographies compiled into a book in recognition of their excellence in industrial and commercial achievements, as well as the contribution to the economic and social development in Hong Kong and Mainland China.

== Discography ==
- Pure Impression (純屬印象) 2001, EP
- Scents(香薰) 2002, album
- Emme 2003, album
- Good Show 2004, album
- The Groove in Me 2008, album

== Filmography ==
- OCTB (2017) (TV series)
- Good Take! (2016)
- Lan Kwai Fong (2011)
- Sasori (2008)
- Kung Fu Fighter (2007)
- Confession of Pain (2006)
- Colour of the Loyalty (2005)
- Beyond Our Ken (2004)
- My Sweetie (2004)

== Personal life ==
Wong married actor Danny Chan Kwok-kwan on 27 October 2014.
