= My Way Film Company =

Hong Kong based films production and distribution company

My Way Film Company Limited (0323875)
- Trade name: My Way Film Production Limited
- Native name: 名威影業有限公司
- Formerly: My Way Film Production (1981–1991)
- Company type: Subsidiary
- Industry: Film
- Founded: 1981; 45 years ago
- Founders: Jeremy Cheung
- Headquarters: Nathan Road Mong Kok, Summit Insurance Bldg, Kowloon, Hong Kong
- Area served: Africa, North America, Asia, Western Europe
- Key people: Jeremy Kai-ping Cheung (Managing director)
- Website: mywayfilm.com.hk

My Way Film Company
- Traditional Chinese: 名威影業有限公司
- Simplified Chinese: 名威影業有限公司
Transcriptions

My Way Film Company (Chinese: 名威影業有限公司) is a film production and distribution company in Hong Kong.

My Way was founded in 1981 by Jeffrey Kai-Ping Cheung and in 1991 changes the name to 'My Way Film Company Limited'. It started production of female-themed action movies in large quantity, martial arts action films and children action films during the early 1990s.

In 1983, it produced female themed action movie in the United States for Asia distribution during the Hong Kong Cinema promotion, the industry has over all media right to a library of about 200 movies.

The film company was founded by Jeremy Kai-ping Cheung, a veteran in the Hong Kong film industries for over 40 years in experience.

Donnie Yen who was the director and the scriptwriter of movie 'The New Big Boss' also starred as 'Fung Man-hin' in the movie.

== Awards ==
The company won, The Most Popular Film Award 1994 on the movie 'Panda The Sun' at Chicago International Children's Film Festival.

== Films produced and distribute ==
List of the films produced and directors:

Year	Title	Director	Distributor	Co-production companies	Notes	Budget	Gross	
1984	Zhi ming jin gang quan (TV Movie 1984)	Chuen-Yee Cha	N/A	N/A	TBA	N/A	N/A	
1985	Du zhou	Ling Pang	NA	N/A	TBA	N/A	N/A	
1986	Tian sha	N/A	My Way Film Company	Artview Investment Co. Ltd, Lui Ming International Film Enterprise	TBA	TBA	$75 million	
1991	Dragon Ball: The Magic Begins	Chun-Liang Chen, Joe Chan, Jun Leung	Filmswell International Limited	N/A	TBA	TBA	TBA	
1992	Phantom War	Fung Chow, Chao-Kuang Yang	N/A	N/A	TBA	N/A		
1992	Maruta 2: Laboratory of the Devil	Godfrey Ho	N/A	N/A	N/A	N/A	N/A	
1997	The New Boss	Donnie Yen	NA	NA	N/A	TBA	HK$818,345.00	
2001	Sex Medusa	Tommy Wai-Tak Lor	Tokuma Japan Communications	My Way Film Company	N/A	N/A	N/A	
2004	Shaolin vs. Evil Dead	Douglas Kung	NA	NA	N/A	TBA	N/A	TBA
2007	Kung Fu Fighter	Yongjian Ye, Ken Yip Wing-Kin	Sil-Metropole Organization	Brilliant Emperor Production, My Way Film Company Limited	N/A	TBA	N/A	TBA
2008	Kung Fu Chefs	Wing-Ken Yip	My Way Film Company	Brilliant Emperor Production Ltd	TBA	HK $183,338.254	N/A	
2008	The Luckiest Man	Lam Tze-chung, Chi Chung Lam, Feili Ling, Stephen Chow	N/A	My Way Film Company Limited, Topkey International Investment Limited	TBA	$18 694	$280,187	
2009	'The Forbidden Legend Sex & Chopsticks 2'	Man Kei Chin	Mega-Vision Pictures (2009), Tornado Film (2010), Joy Sales Film and Video Distributors (2009), Madman Entertainment (2012)	My Way Film Company, Twin Co. Ltd, Universal Media & Entertainmen Group	N/A	TBA	$228,343.	
2014	The Real Iron Monkey	Wing-Ken Yip, Tony Tang Tung Ming	My Way Film Company	N/A	TBA	N/A	N/A	
2014	Unbeatable Youth	Ken Yip Wing Kin	My Way Film Company Limited	N/A	TBA	TBA	N/A	

== Sources ==
- IMDB ID
- Source Hong Kong Companies Registry, (http://www.icris.cr.gov.hk/), 16 December 2019
- "Films produced by My Way Film Company Limited". letterboxd.com.
- "My Way Film Company Limited- company profile". Dun & Bradstreet.
