= The Luckiest Man =

2008 Hong Kong film by Lam Tze-chung

The Luckiest Man/(Везунчик)
- (Da Si Xi); Daai Sei Hei (大四喜)
- Directed by: Chi Chung Lam, Feili Ling, Stephen Chow
- Written by: Chi Chung Lam
- Screenplay by: Lam Tze-Chung
- Produced by: Panpan Yeung, Sharon Yeung Pan-Pan (executive producer)
- Starring: Pak-cheung Chan; Wah Yuen; Bosco Wong; Monica Chan; Kwok Kuen Chan; Timmy Hung; Chi Chung Lam; Kai Man Tin
- Cinematography: Kwan Chi-Kan
- Edited by: Tang Man-To
- Music by: Brother Hung
- Production companies: My Way Film Company Limited, Topkey International Investment Limited
- Release dates: 29 May 2008 (Hong Kong); 4 September 2008
- Running time: 1h 29m
- Countries: Hong Kong, China
- Languages: Chinese, Cantonese
- Budget: $18 694

The Luckiest Man is a Hong Kong anarchic comedy drama produced in 2008 and directed by Lam Tze-chung.

== Plot and summary ==
The king of gambling 'Mr. Ho' got rich through and became the of the Hong Kong Mahjong industry during the 50s. Mr. Ho has three wives and three children's, his wives appeared to be competing against each other due to the family's wealth as they live in harmony, but at all cost, the three wives have experience in martial arts (Kung Fu), during the dinner they sometimes have a martial arts showdown. The cause of their quarrel was when Mr. Ho brings (Ah Fai) his loved child back home, his wives and the other children want 'Ah Fai' dead. After realizing that he is getting old, he challenges each of his sons to manage a Mahjong parlor which was done for some period of time.

Aside from talking behind his back which his three wives always do, they also poison his food leading to a little scatological humor and the awful mental image of 'Mr Ho' seen spending six hours in the toilet.

He later escapes his crappy life by running around searching for his first love, instead of seeing another freeloader; his long lost grandchild 'Fai' which will be seen as potentially less inheritance money to his order families.

A huge amount was paid just to get cheating masters with more experience to take 'Ah Fai' down in the 'Mahjong' but 'Mr. Ho' notice the setup and decided to hire three good masters in 'Mah Jong' of the 50s who are retired for long, to help 'Ah Fai' and his natural talent makes him masters the techniques of MahJong and that how the challenge begins.

All these was done because he Mr Ho needs to see if one can get the best rest and to be the next (heir) his successor for the Mahjong parlour.

For the family to get rid of 'Ah Fai', the long lost grandchild; they try to pay him off and attempt to drive him from the house using some tricks, like epoxy, aphrodisiac, and itching powder but in the end, it became silly at objectives.

== Cast crew ==
- Nat Chan Pak-Cheung as Mr 'Ho' Bee Fat
- Yuen Qiu as Sophie (Fat's) 1st wife
- Pinky Cheung Man-Chi as Ling (Fat's) 2nd wife
- Monica Chan Fat-Yung as Yung (Fat's) 3rd wife
- Lam Tze-Chung as Fatty
- Bosco Wong Chung-Chak as Ho Fai
- Timmy Hung Tin-Ming as Ho Key
- Danny Chan Kwok-Kwan as Ho Kin
- Deng Zi-Yi as Ciccy Ho
- Wong Shu-Tong as Uncle Tin
- Lee Fung (1) as Mimi
- Samuel Pang King-Chi as Daredevil 1
- Kit Cheung Man-Kit as Daredevil 2
- Liu Yan-Yu as Daredevil 3
- Leung Wai-Yan
- Tenky Tin Kai-Man as Uncle Tin
- Cheung Tat-Ming as Uncle Ming
- Vincent Kok Tak-Chiu as Uncle Vincent
- Lee Hoi-Sang as Fat's buddy
- Chan Min-Leung as Fat's buddy
- Mok Wai-Man as Fat's buddy
- Yeung Lun (2) as Crazy Hon
- Joe Cheng Cho as Doctor Chan
- Terence Tsui Chi-Hung as Steven
- Ng Shui-Ting as Lawyer Lau
- Choi Siu-Jan
- Wu Yuk-Ho
- Hui Sze-Man as Uncle Ming's wife

== Sources ==
- The Luckiest Man (2008) - Where to Watch It Streaming Online | Reelgood
- "Luckiest Man Bosco Wong". www.amazon.com.
