= Kung Fu Chefs =

2009 Hong Kong film by Ken Yip

- Directed by: Ken Yip
- Written by: Wang Bo; Simon Lu; Cyrus Cheng; Chu Jun-yue; Yuan Li-jiang
- Produced by: Jeremy Cheung
- Starring: Sammo Hung; Vanness Wu; Cherrie Ying; Ai Kago; Timmy Hung; Lam Chi-chung; Louis Fan; Leung Siu-lung; Ku Feng; Lee Hoi-sang
- Cinematography: Kwan Chi-kan
- Edited by: Tang Man-to
- Music by: Victor Lau; Terry Tye
- Production company: Brilliant Emperor Production Ltd.
- Distributed by: My Way Film Company Limited
- Release dates: 19 February 2009 (China); 12 June 2009 (Hong Kong)
- Running time: 92 minutes
- Country: Hong Kong
- Language: Cantonese
- Box office: HK $183,338.25

Kung Fu Chefs (traditional Chinese: 功夫廚神; simplified Chinese: 功夫厨神; pinyin: GōngFū ChǔShén; Jyutping: Gung1 Fu1 Cu4 San4) is a 2009 Hong Kong action film directed by Ken Yip, starring Sammo Hung, Louis Fan, Vanness Wu, Sammo Hung's real life son Timmy Hung, Ku Feng and Lee Hoi-sang. This was Lee Hoi-Sang's final film appearance. This film was shot with a low budget.

== Plot ==
Wong Kai Joe (Louis Fan) has had hatred of his uncle Wong Ping Yee (Sammo Hung) in his heart for a very long time and does what he can to oust his uncle from the village and to claim rights to the Dragon Head Cleaver, a symbol of power to the clan. During a function, he used Yee's nephew to put poison in the form of salt. The guest become sick and Wong Ping Yee is forced out of the village. The story then shifts to Ken'chi who is the first to graduate from his school after being the first amongst his batch to place the emblem in the flag. He is advised by his principal to go and meet Master Sum who, he feels, will be able to teach him cooking. Meanwhile, Yee encounters Shum Ching (Cherrie Ying) and her sister (Ai Kago) by chance, and is determined to help them during troubled times at their restaurant "Four Seas". He trains a young chef, Ken'ichi Lung Kin Yat (Vanness Wu) to compete against Chef Tin (Lam Chi-chung), the head chef at "Imperial Palace", for the title of "Top Chef". After the tournament, he meets his brother who is alive and to the angst of Joe who watches helplessly on TV.

== Cast ==
Cast	Role	Description
Sammo Hung	Wong Ping Yee 黃秉義	Village head Ken'ichi's master Wing Ping Kei's younger brother Wong Kai Joe's uncle Briefly "Four Seas Restaurant" chef
Vanness Wu	Ken'ichi Lung Kin Yat 龍建一	Wong Ping Yee's disciple Shum Ying's lover "Four Seas Restaurant" chef
Cherrie Ying	Shum Ching 沈青	"Four Seas Restaurant" owner Shum Ying's older sister
Ai Kago	Shum Ying 沈瑩	Shum Ching's younger sister "Four Seas Restaurant" employee Ken'ichi's lover
Timmy Hung	Leung 良	Village member Wong Kai Joe's henchman
Lam Chi-chung	Tin Chow-to 田秋刀	Famous champion chef King of Cantonese Restaurant head chef
Louis Fan	Wong Kai Joe 黃繼祖	Wong Ping Kei's son Wong Ping Yee's nephew
Leung Siu-lung	Wong Ping Kei 黃秉基	Wong Ping Yee's older brother Wong Kai Joe's father Two time champion chef
Xing Yu	Choi 財	Wong Kai Joe's henchman
Ku Feng	2nd Granduncle 二叔公	2nd elder of village
Hoi Sang Lee	Great Grandfather 圍村太公	1st elder of village
Ho Kwai Lam	Shum Fong Kwan 沈方鈞	Former "For Seas Restaurant" chef "King of Cantonese Restaurant" chef
Mok Mei Lam	Principal Fong 方校長	Ken'ichi's principal
Chun Wong	Yue Poon Cheung 于本昌	Judge at competition

== See also ==
- Osaka Wrestling Restaurant
- Sammo Hung filmography
