= Danny Chan Kwok-kwan =

Hong Kong actor, martial artist, and singer (born 1975)

Danny Chan
- 陳國坤
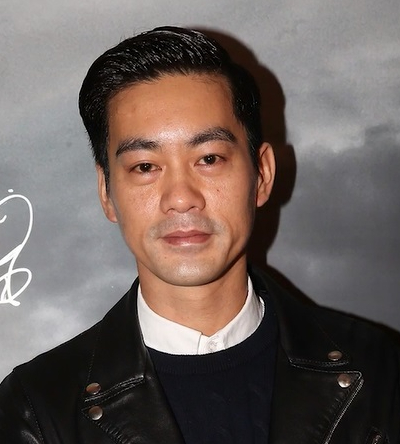
- Chan in 2018
- Born: Chan Kwok-kwan; 1 August 1975 (age 51); Hong Kong
- Occupations: Actor; martial artist
- Spouse: Emme Wong (m. 2014)
- Musical career
- Also known as: Siu Long (小龍, "Little Dragon")
- Instrument: Vocals
- Member of: Poet

Chinese name
- Traditional Chinese: 陳國坤
- Simplified Chinese: 陈国坤
Transcriptions
Standard Mandarin
- Hanyu Pinyin: Chén Guókūn
Yue: Cantonese
- Jyutping: Can^{4} Gwok^{3}-kwan^{1}

Signature
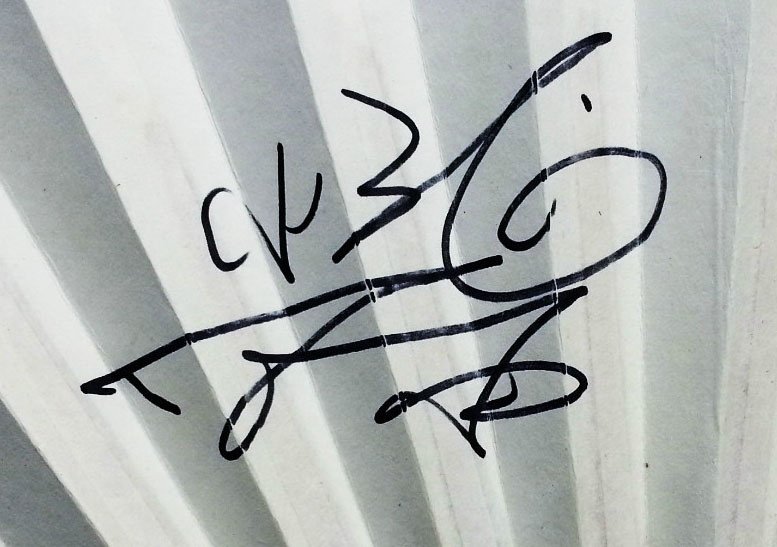

Danny Chan Kwok-kwan (born 1 August 1975) is a Hong Kong actor and martial artist. He is known for resembling Bruce Lee in appearance and has portrayed Lee in the 2008 television series The Legend of Bruce Lee, the 2015 film Ip Man 3, and its 2019 sequel, Ip Man 4. Chan is also a practitioner of Jeet Kune Do, the martial art created by Bruce Lee.

== Career ==
Chan started his career as the lead singer of the rock band Poet. He also played minor roles in several Hong Kong films. He first came to prominence for acting in two films directed by Stephen Chow: as the goalkeeper "Empty Hand" in Shaolin Soccer (2001) and as the Axe Gang boss Brother Sum in Kung Fu Hustle (2004). In 2008, due to his resemblance to Bruce Lee, he was chosen to portray the famous martial artist in the biographical television series The Legend of Bruce Lee.

Chan reprised his role as Lee in the 2015 film Ip Man 3, which is loosely based on the life of Lee's mentor. He took on the role once more in the 2019 film Ip Man 4, the final installment in the franchise.

== Personal life ==
Chan has been married to Hong Kong actress Emme Wong since 2014. He is pro-Beijing and expressed support for the Hong Kong Police Force during the 2019–2020 riots. He had posted on social media that police should not "go easy on any [protesters]" nor "let any one of them go".

== Selected filmography ==
=== Film ===
List of film appearances, with year, title, and role shown
Year	Title	Role
1996	Young and Dangerous 3 古惑仔3之隻手遮天	Fat Sze's gangster
1999	Sealed with a Kiss 甜言蜜語	Yellow-haired thug
2001	Shaolin Soccer 少林足球	Empty/Lightning Hand
2001	Bullets of Love 不死情謎	
2002	The Era of Vampires 殭屍大時代	Choi
2004	Kung Fu Hustle 功夫	Brother Sum
2007	It's a Wonderful Life 心想事成	Sun Wukong, the Monkey God
2007	Kung Fu Fighter 功夫無敵	Don Ching
2008	CJ7 長江七號	
2008	My Wife is a Gambling Maestro 我老婆係賭聖	Manu
2008	The Luckiest Man 大四喜	Ho Kin
2009	All's Well, Ends Well 2009 家有喜事2009	Web single #2
2010	Just Another Pandora's Box 越光寶盒	Soldier
2010	Ice Kacang Puppy Love 初戀紅豆冰	Aquarium owner
2015	Monk Comes Down the Mountain 道士下山	Zhao Xinchuan
2015	Blind Spot 探靈檔案	
2015	Ip Man 3 葉問3	Bruce Lee
2018	Kung Fu League	Chen Zhen
2019	Ip Man 4 葉問4	Bruce Lee

=== Television ===
List of television appearances, with year, title, and role shown
Year	Title	Role	Channel
2008	The Legend of Bruce Lee 李小龍傳奇	Bruce Lee	CCTV
2011	Twin of Brothers 大唐雙龍傳之長生訣	Kou Zhong	CCTV-1
