= Tough (manga) =

Japanese manga series and its adaptations

- First tankōbon volume cover, featuring Kiichi "Kiibo" Miyazawa

高校鉄拳伝タフ/タフ (Kōkō Tekken-den Tafu)
- Genre: Martial arts
- Manga

High School Exciting Story: Tough
- Written by: Tetsuya Saruwatari
- Published by: Shueisha
- English publisher: NA: Viz Media
- Imprint: Young Jump Comics
- Magazine: Weekly Young Jump
- Original run: 1993 – 2003
- Volumes: 42
Further information
Manga
Oton
| Written by | Tetsuya Saruwatari |
| Published by | Shueisha |
| Imprint | Young Jump Comics |
| Magazine | Young Jump Zōkan Mankaku (2001–2008); Monthly Young Jump (2009); Grand Jump (2021) |
| Original run | 2001 – 2021 |
| Volumes | 2 |
Original video animation
Shootfighter Tekken
| Directed by | Yukio Nishimoto |
| Written by | Jin Munesue |
| Studio | AIC |
| Licensed by | NA: Central Park Media |
| Released | January 31, 2002 – December 7, 2004 |
| Episodes | 3 |
Manga
Tough
| Written by | Tetsuya Saruwatari |
| Published by | Shueisha |
| Imprint | Young Jump Comics |
| Magazine | Weekly Young Jump |
| Original run | July 31, 2003 – July 19, 2012 |
| Volumes | 39 |
Manga
Tough: Ryū o Tsugu Otoko
| Written by | Tetsuya Saruwatari |
| Published by | Shueisha |
| Imprint | Young Jump Comics |
| Magazine | Weekly Playboy |
| Original run | December 21, 2015 – June 23, 2025 |
| Volumes | 35 |
Manga
Tough: Chapter 2
| Written by | Tetsuya Saruwatari |
| Published by | Shueisha |
| Imprint | Young Jump Comics |
| Magazine | Weekly Playboy |
| Original run | September 22, 2025 – present |
| Volumes | 1 |
- icon

Tough, known in Japan as High School Exciting Story: Tough (Japanese: 高校鉄拳伝タフ, Hepburn: Kōkō Tekken-den Tough; lit. 'Tough: High School Iron Fist Legend'), is a Japanese martial arts manga series written and illustrated by Tetsuya Saruwatari. It was serialized in Shueisha's seinen manga magazine Weekly Young Jump from 1993 to 2003, with its chapters collected in 42 tankōbon volumes. A sequel series, titled Tough (Latin-script title in the original release), was published in the same magazine from 2003 to 2012, with its chapters collected in 39 volumes. The first series was licensed in North America by Viz Media, who only published the first six volumes from 2005 to 2006.

A three-episode original video animation (OVA) series adaptation was released in 2002, and released in North America, as Shootfighter Tekken, by Central Park Media in 2004; the third episode was only released in North America. A spin-off series, titled Oton, has been irregularly published across three Shueisha's magazines from 2001 to 2008, in 2009, and in 2021. Another series, titled Tough: Ryū o Tsugu Otoko, was serialized in Shueisha's Weekly Playboy from 2015 to 2025. A fifth installment, Tough: Chapter 2, started in Weekly Playboy in 2025.

== Plot ==
The story follows Kiichi "Kiibo" Miyazawa, a 17-year-old high school student, and his father, Seiko Miyazawa, who trains him in their family's secret martial art, Nadashinkage-ryu. Kiichi is passionate about martial arts and seeks strength by engaging in street fights and tournaments across Japan and beyond. The martial art involves a combination of punches, kicks, throws, grappling, and knowledge of pressure points on the human body. Kiichi's journey is driven by a desire to become strong and test his skills against fighters from various regions.

== Characters ==
Kiichi Miyazawa (宮沢 憙一, Miyazawa Kiichi) / Kiibo (キー坊)
Voiced by: Mitsuo Iwata
Kiibo has been trained in the Nadashinkage-ryu—a martial art constructed around the art of assassination—from his father since childhood in order to be the next successor. Kiibo must team-up with a rag-tag group of friends in his journey to become a master. He faces the challenge of defeating his numerous adversaries without employing his fighting style's lethal techniques, an ideology his uncle believes make him "weak".
Seiko Miyazawa (宮沢 静虎, Miyazawa Seiko) / Oton (オトン)
Voiced by: Masakatsu Funaki
14th master of the Nadashinkage-ryu. He has a calm personality, yet will put up a good fight whenever one occurs. A long time ago, before Kiichi was born, Seiko was one of the best fighters in the world. His retirement match against Iron Kiba is still talked about to this day.
Kiryu Miyazawa (宮沢 鬼龍, Miyazawa Kiryu)
Seiko's twin brother and Kiichi's uncle. Unlike his brother, Kiryu is wicked and completely ruthless. In the side story Oton", it is revealed that Kiryu fathered a child with the daughter of the United States President. One of his children, Ryusei Nagaoka is a main character in the third series.
Sonō Miyazawa (宮沢 尊鷹, Miyazawa Sonō)
The eldest Miyazawa sibling believed murdered by Kiryu, according to the series' back story, who later resurfaced as the Battle King of the Hyper Battle, a title bestowed on him because of his great fighting skill and his winning of the last tournament. He also has the ability to change his appearance with the use of a special technique. He is the Battle King
Kintoki Miyazawa (宮沢 金時, Miyazawa Kintoki)
13th Master of Nadashinkage-ryu. Father of Seiko, grandfather of Kiichi.

=== Fighters ===
Mitsuhide Kuroda (黒田 光秀, Kuroda Mitsuhide) / Ashura (阿修羅)
Voiced by: Tomokazu Sugita
Master of rival style Nada Shinyō-ryu who becomes Kiichi's friend.
Masaharu Kiba (木場正治, Kiba Masaharu) / Iron Kiba (アイアン 木場, Aian Kiba)
Voiced by: Norio Wakamoto
The greatest pro wrestler in Japan. A very tall man with massive strength and an artificial eye, he has faced and defeated judoka, wrestlers and boxers through his career. He lost his eye against Seiko and vowed to destroy Nakashinkage-Ryu out of revenge.
Goji Kano (加納 剛次, Kanō Gōji)
The number one school judoka in Japan and a future Olympic. Though he makes himself look like an honorable and respectful opponent, he is actually an arrogant and sadistic young man.
Yoshio Takahashi (高石 義生, Takahashi Yoshio)
Voiced by: Kiyoyuki Yanada
A brutal pro wrestler who was blacklisted from wrestling companies after crippling a Mexican champion named Chico Fernández with a piledriver technique. An eccentric but violent man, he trained muay thai in Thailand for three years, before working for Iron Kiba.
Heizo Onikawa (鬼川 平蔵, Onikawa Heizo)
Voiced by: Fumihiko Inoue
A professional wrestler and jiu-jitsu expert, he was regarded as the best grappler on the planet. Onikawa works as a wrestling enforcer.
Kiyomasa Samon (左門 清正, Samon Kiyomasa)
Voiced by: Fumihiko Tachiki
A professional wrestler, disciple of Onikawa.
Shingo Aoi (葵 新吾, Aoi Shingo)
Voiced by: Takehito Koyasu
An agile jiu-jitsu fighter, expert in the use of the flying armbar. He was born in a rich family, but was overlooked by his parents in favour of his ill brother.
Krungthep Suwanpakdee (ギャルアッド・スワンパクティ, Gyaruaddo Suwanpakuti)
Thailand's muay thai champion.
Noboru Asada (朝田 昇, Asada Noboru) / Chōshō (朝昇)
A shoot wrestling greatmaster. Former university student, he became feared in the pro wrestling world when he destroyed a wrestler who bullied him.
Heath Clancy (ヒース・クランシー, Hīsu Kuranshī)
A fighter from a family of martial artists, who competed in the tournament to fight his brother Gordon to avenge the death of their father, Emilio Clancy. He is defeated by Gordon and learns that their father actually died of cancer.
Gordon Clancy (ゴードン・クランシー, Gōdon Kuranshī)
Heath's big brother, unbeaten in 500 vale tudo matches. He fights to gain money for his ill son, and can use yoga to control his body. Kiichi defeats him at the end.
Shinichi Kiba (木場 新一, Kiba Shinichi) / Kibashin (キバシン)
The son of Iron Kiba. Unlike his father, he has some honor and respect for his opponents.
Remco Yarobu (レムコ・ヤーロブ, Remuko Yārobu)
Iron Kiba's hitman, he is a gigantic sumo wrestler from Hawaii. He actually wants to gain money for his alcoholic mother.
Enzo Sasagawa (笹川 エンゾウ, Sasagawa Enzō)
A ferocious fighter who does not feel pain due to years of abuse from his parents.

== Media ==
=== Manga ===
Written and illustrated by Tetsuya Saruwatari, Tough: High School Iron Fist Legend was serialized in Shueisha's seinen manga magazine Weekly Young Jump from 1993 to 2003. Shueisha collected its chapters in 42 tankōbon volumes, released from March 13, 1994, and July 18, 2003. In North America, Viz Media released six volumes, under its Editor's Choice imprint, from January 4, 2005, to April 16, 2006. These volumes omitted some chapters and artwork for graphic violence, and have been discontinued.

A sequel series, Tough (Latin-script title), continued serialization in the magazine starting on July 31, 2003, and finished on July 19, 2012. Shueisha collected its chapters in 39 tankōbon volumes, released from January 19, 2004, to August 17, 2012.

A gaiden series, titled Oton (おとん), was irregularly published in Shueisha's Young Jump Zōkan Mankaku (from 2001 to 2008), and Monthly Young Jump (in 2009). Two volumes were released on January 19, 2004, and February 19, 2008. Another chapter was published in Grand Jump on April 21, 2021.

Another series, titled Tough: Ryū o Tsugu Otoko (TOUGH 龍を継ぐ男; lit. 'Tough: The Man Who Inherits the Dragon'), was serialized in Shueisha's Weekly Playboy from December 21, 2015, to June 23, 2025. Shueisha collected its chapters in 35 tankōbon volumes, released from May 19, 2016, to September 19, 2025.

A fifth installment, titled Tough: Chapter 2 (TOUGH 第二章), started in Weekly Playboy on September 22, 2025. Shueisha released its first volume on May 19, 2026.

=== Original video animation ===
The series received a three-episode original video animation (OVA) adaptation animated by AIC. The first two episodes were distributed by Spike in Japan and released on January 31 and March 28, 2002.

It was licensed in North America by Central Park Media as Shootfighter Tekken. The first two episodes were released on August 24 and October 19, 2004, respectively, while the third episode (unreleased in Japan) was released on December 7 of that same year.

=== Video game ===
A video game based on the series, titled Tough: Dark Fight, was published by Konami and released for the PlayStation 2 in Japan on December 1, 2005. The fighting game takes place in between the two missing years between the two manga series. The game features a number of characters from the manga, as well as eight new characters.

== Reception ==
By May 2026, the overall Tough manga franchise had over 16 million copies in circulation.
