= Minna Agechau =

Japanese manga series

- First tankōbon volume cover, featuring Rokuro Chikanaka and Yuno Mamiya

みんなあげちゃう
- Genre: Erotic comedy
- Manga
- Written by: Hikaru Yuzuki
- Published by: Shueisha
- Imprint: Young Jump Comics
- Magazine: Weekly Young Jump
- Original run: 1982 – 1987
- Volumes: 19
- Live-action film
- Directed by: Shusuke Kaneko
- Written by: Toshiki Inoue
- Studio: Nikkatsu
- Released: April 20, 1985
- Runtime: 90 minutes
- Original video animation
- Directed by: Osamu Uemura; Yoshihide Kuriyama
- Produced by: Mitsuhisa Hida; Nagateru Katou; Yasuhisa Kazama
- Written by: Yutaka Takahashi
- Music by: Hiromoto Tobisawa
- Studio: J.C.Staff
- Released: March 28, 1987
- Runtime: 45 minutes
- Live-action television film
- Original network: Fuji TV
- Released: June 22, 1987
- icon

Minna Agechau (みんなあげちゃう; lit. 'I'll Give Them All Away'), also known as I Give My All, is a Japanese manga series written and illustrated by Hikaru Yuzuki. It was serialized in Shueisha's seinen manga magazine Weekly Young Jump from 1982 to 1987, with its chapters collected in 19 tankōbon volumes. It was adapted into a live action film in 1985. An original video animation (OVA) and a television special were released in 1987. The OVA was planned to be released in North America by Central Park Media in 1991, but it was canceled due to negative publicity.

== Plot ==
Undergraduate exam candidate Rokuro Chikanaka (地下中 六郎, Chikanaka Rokurō), living in a modest apartment, is unexpectedly visited by high school student Yuno Mamiya (間宮 悠乃, Mamiya Yuno), a virgin heiress who arrives with a 15-billion-yen dowry and proposes cohabitation. The couple soon loses the bankbook, reverting to poverty and threatening their relationship. Yuno's grandfather, Shigezō Mamiya (間宮 重蔵, Shigezō Mamiya), who has been monitoring them, intervenes to resolve the misunderstanding and grants his approval for their union, intending for Yuno—raised in an extravagant household—to learn the hardships of ordinary life.

To continue the relationship, Rokuro must secure admission to the same university as Yuno, which he achieves through great difficulty. Yuno becomes pregnant, and the two formally marry during their first year of university. Subsequently, Rokuro is subjected to a series of trials imposed by the Mamiya family to prove his worthiness as a new member of their clan.

== Media ==
=== Manga ===
Written and illustrated by Hikaru Yuzuki, Minna Agechau was serialized in Shueisha's seinen manga magazine Weekly Young Jump from 1982 to 1987. Shueisha collected its chapters in 19 tankōbon volumes, released from July 19, 1983, to October 19, 1987.

=== Live-action films ===
A live-action film adaptation directed by Shusuke Kaneko premiered on April 20, 1985. The film won the ninth Best Film of the year award at the seventh Yokohama Film Festival.

A television special aired on June 22, 1987.

=== Original video animation ===
A 45-minute original video animation (OVA) adaptation, directed by Osamu Uemura and animated by J.C.Staff, was released on March 28, 1987.

The OVA was planned to be released in North America by Central Park Media in 1991; however, it was canceled due to negative publicity.

== See also ==
- Amai Seikatsu, another manga series by the same author
