= Muteki no Hito =

Japanese manga series

- First tankōbon volume cover

無敵の人
- Genre: Mahjong
- Manga
- Written by: Shinobu Kaitani
- Published by: Kodansha
- Imprint: Shōnen Magazine Comics
- Magazine: Weekly Shōnen Magazine (2015–2016); Magazine Pocket (2016)
- Original run: December 22, 2015 – October 5, 2016
- Volumes: 4
- icon

Muteki no Hito (無敵の人; "Invincible Man") is a Japanese manga series written and illustrated by Shinobu Kaitani. It was first serialized in Kodansha's shōnen manga magazine Weekly Shōnen Magazine December 2015 to October 2016 and later on the Magazine Pocket manga application from June to October 2016.

== Publication ==
Written and illustrated by Shinobu Kaitani, Muteki no Hito was serialized for 24 chapters in Kodansha's shōnen manga magazine Weekly Shōnen Magazine from December 22, 2015, to June 8, 2016. The series was later transferred to the Magazine Pocket digital manga platform, where it continued from July 8 to October 5, 2016. Kodansha collected its chapters in four tankōbon volumes, released from March 17 to December 16, 2016.

=== Volumes ===
No.	Japanese release date	Japanese ISBN
1	March 17, 2016	978-4-06-395615-3
2	June 17, 2016	978-4-06-395668-9
3	September 16, 2016	978-4-06-395765-5
4	December 16, 2016	978-4-06-395824-9
