= If I See You in My Dreams =

Japanese manga series

- First tankōbon volume cover

夢で逢えたら (Yume de Aetera)
- Genre: Romantic comedy
- Manga
- Written by: Noriyuki Yamahana
- Published by: Shueisha
- Magazine: Business Jump
- Original run: 1994 – 1999
- Volumes: 17
- Original video animation
- Directed by: Hiroshi Watanabe
- Written by: Hisashi Tokimura; Kazuhiko Kobe
- Music by: Shigesato Kanezumi
- Studio: J.C.Staff
- Licensed by: NA: Media Blasters
- Released: April 21, 1998 – December 19, 1998
- Episodes: 3
- Anime television series
- Directed by: Takeshi Yamaguchi
- Written by: Kazuhiko Godo
- Music by: Moka
- Studio: J.C.Staff
- Licensed by: NA: Media Blasters
- Original network: TBS
- Original run: December 1, 1998 – December 25, 1998
- Episodes: 16
- icon

If I See You in My Dreams (Japanese: 夢で逢えたら, Hepburn: Yume de Aetara) is a Japanese manga series written and illustrated by Noriyuki Yamahana. It was serialized in Shueisha's seinen manga magazine Business Jump from 1994 to 1999, with its chapters collected in seventeen tankōbon volumes. It was adapted by J.C.Staff into a three-episode original video animation (OVA) series released from April to December 1998, followed by a sixteen-episode anime television series broadcast on TBS in December 1999.

== Plot ==
The story follows a Japanese salaryman Masuo Fugano in a big city, who falls in love with Nagisa Shiozaki, a kindergarten teacher. Masuo tries repeatedly to court Nagisa, but every time he seems to make progress, something inevitably goes wrong. Nagisa, in fact, likes Masuo, but due to a previous heartbreak, she constantly pushes him away.

As the series progresses, it becomes more thoughtful and mature, with many of the problems evolving out of the characters' personalities rather than being imposed artificially by circumstances. Many of the coincidental misunderstandings have to do with Masuo interacting with coworker Miho Hamaoka, the daughter of the company president, who has fallen in love with Masuo, but Masuo lacks the confidence to believe it to be true.

Initially, Masuo has to face two other comical suitors for Nagisa's love. One being Kaizuka, a tall muscular physical education high school teacher, and Kujira, a short rich and perverted real estate agent. Later on he has to face much more serious competition from Nagisa's first love, Minato.

At one point later on, Masuo takes in a pregnant woman out of compassion. This information makes its way to Nagisa, but in a different form; she is told that the girl is pregnant with his child, but she eventually determines the truth for herself. The series ends with Nagisa having their child named Yuka in her arm smiling happily.

The TV series takes a more comedic tone than the OVA and involves much of the early unlucky coincidences from the manga. In the TV series, Masuo faces no competition from other suitors but merely must face Nagisa's difficulty with men while Kaizuka and Kujira appear in the OVA to try to win Nagisa's love.

== Media ==
=== Manga ===
Written and illustrated by Noriyuki Yamahana, If I See You in My Dreams was serialized in Shueisha's seinen manga magazine Business Jump from 1994 to 1999. Shueisha collected its chapters in seventeen tankōbon volumes, released from September 19, 1994, to February 18, 2000.

=== Original video animation ===
A three-episode original video animation (OVA), produced by TBS and Nippon Columbia, animated by J.C.Staff and directed by Hiroshi Watanabe, was released from April 21 to December 19, 1998. The OVA was licensed for English release in North America by Media Blasters and launched on DVD on April 29, 2003.

=== Anime ===
A sixteen-episode anime television series adaptation of seven minutes each, produced by TBS and Nippon Columbia, animated by J.C.Staff and directed by Takeshi Yamaguchi, was broadcast in Japan on the TBS's Wonderful programming block from December 1–25, 1998. The series was licensed for English release in North America by Media Blasters and launched on DVD on June 24, 2003.

== Reception ==
=== Original video animation ===
Hannah Stanton of THEM Anime Reviews gave the OVA 2 out of 5 stars. Stanton wrote that the series "lacks some of the charm" of other similar works like Maison Ikkoku, calling the characters "amazingly bland" and stating that every romantic drama stereotype is expected. Patrick King of Animefringe called the OVA "predictable" and that due to its brevity it does not have time to drag out various potential conflicts, introducing instead problems only long enough to solve them and move on; however, King said that he enjoyed that aspect of the show. Bamboo Dong of Anime News Network wrote that while the OVA episodes are "somewhat funny at times", they are "too short to really accomplish anything", stating that the "sweet and caring" emotional moments of the series are "the aspects that keep the OVA enjoyable." Chris Beveridge of AnimeOnDVD also called the OVA "predictable", but adding that he had no problem with that because it "so nicely done", calling it a "nice decent romance without the real bad stuff".

=== Anime ===
In comparing the OVA to TV series, King said that in the latter there in more time for character development, more comedy and sight gags and "multiple counts of outright nudity". Beveridge, making the same comparison, said that the TV series is "just more of the same – sometimes exactly the same – but with more filler added to it", adding that "the charm from the OVA series is really lacking here". Dong gave the TV series a B grade. Dong called the series "awful", "extremely repetitive" and "highly predictable", adding that the "one-dimensionality" of the characters is "just disappointing". Dong praised the "comical use of figurative animation", which draws the line between regular imagery and an exaggerated portrayal of reality. Enoch Lau of THEM Anime reviews gave the TV series 1 out of 5 stars. Lau compared the series negatively to Love Hina, also criticizing the repetition of its "plot cycle" in its sixteen episodes and calling the animation and art quality "obviously dated".
