= Master of Zen =

1994 Hong Kong film by Brandy Yuen

- DVD cover art
- 達摩祖師傳
- Directed by: Brandy Yuen
- Written by: Brandy Yuen; Johnny Lee; Chan Koo-fong; Sam Yeung
- Produced by: Brandy Yuen
- Starring: Derek Yee; Louis Fan
- Cinematography: Stephen Poon
- Edited by: Chun Yu
- Music by: Lowell Lo; Sherman Chow
- Production company: Brandy Film Production
- Release date: 26 February 1994
- Running time: 89 minutes
- Country: Hong Kong
- Language: Cantonese
- Box office: HK$2,126,231

Master of Zen (達摩祖師傳), also known as Bodhidharma, is a 1994 Hong Kong film based on the legends surrounding the life of the Buddhist monk Bodhidharma, who lived around the fifth or sixth century. The film was directed, produced, and co-written by Brandy Yuen, and starred Derek Yee and Louis Fan in the leading roles.

== Synopsis ==
Bodhidharma was born in Kanchipuram in the fifth or sixth century as the third son of a Pallava king in South India. After his father dies, he leaves home and practises Buddhism under the tutelage of the master Prajnatara. Many decades later, he travels to China to spread Zen Buddhism and search for a successor.

In China, Bodhidharma meets Emperor Wu of the Liang dynasty and tells him that he has not accumulated any merit even though the emperor has made many financial contributions to the Buddhist community. The emperor is displeased after hearing what Bodhidharma said. The locals are also unfriendly towards Bodhidharma, but he surprises them on one occasion when he saves a girl from drowning, and crosses a river by using qinggong and with the aid of a reed. Bodhidharma eventually arrives at Shaolin Monastery and settles down in a cave in the backhill. He faces the wall and enters a state of meditation for nine years. He did not move at all throughout those years and many people came to look at him when they heard about it.

Shenguang is a former soldier who has given up violence and become a Buddhist monk to seek peace and redemption. After experiencing strange visions, he makes his way to Shaolin and kneels outside the cave under heavy snowfall. By then, Bodhidharma has awakened from his meditation and he accepts Shenguang as his apprentice after Shenguang cuts off his left arm to show his sincerity. Bodhidharma renames Shenguang to "Huike".

Bodhidharma fends off a group of thugs trying to rob the Shaolin monks and miraculously survives after being set on fire. The robbers retreat in shame when they realise they cannot harm him. After witnessing the Shaolin monks' inability to protect themselves, Bodhidharma teaches them martial arts, which later evolved into Shaolin Kung Fu. In his old age, he wishes to return to India so he gathers his apprentices and tests their understanding of his teachings. He eventually chooses Huike as his successor.

In the final scene, Bodhidharma is seen walking away with a single shoe dangling from his staff. He meets a peasant, who greets him. The peasant later goes to Shaolin to tell a monk that he met Bodhidharma earlier, but the monk says Bodhidharma died three years ago. To verify the truth, they open Bodhidharma's coffin and are surprised to see that it is empty, except for the other shoe.

== Cast ==
- Derek Yee as Bodhidharma
- Louis Fan as Shenguang / Huike
- Chan Chung-yung as Prajnatara
- Wu Ma as Shenguang's master
- Fan Mei-sheng as the fat monk
- Eddy Ko as Bodhidharma's father
- Austin Wai as Bodhidharma's brother

== Reception ==
Mark Pollard wrote in a review on the website Kung Fu Cinema:

Brandy Yuen's Master of Zen is a rare gem in the realm of martial arts movies. It contains equal parts wuxia-styled martial arts, drama and religious philosophy. Yuen manages to create an action-filled homage to Bodhidharma (known as Tamo in China), the symbolic father of Shaolin wushu while staying true to the figure’s influence on the development of Chan (Zen) Buddhism in China.
