= Jōō (manga) =

Japanese manga series

- First tankōbon volume cover

嬢王
- Manga
- Written by: Ryō Kurashina
- Illustrated by: Nao Kurebayashi
- Published by: Shueisha
- Magazine: Business Jump
- Original run: August 12, 2004 – February 1, 2008
- Volumes: 12
- Manga

Jōō Virgin
- Written by: Ryō Kurashina
- Illustrated by: Nao Kurebayashi
- Published by: Shueisha
- Magazine: Business Jump
- Original run: April 30, 2009 – September 1, 2010
- Volumes: 5
- Live-action series
- Jōō (2005–2010)

Jōō (嬢王; lit. "Queen") is a Japanese manga series written by Ryō Kurashina and illustrated by Nao Kurebayashi. It was serialized in Shueisha's seinen manga magazine Business Jump from 2004 to 2008, with its chapters collected in twelve tankōbon volumes. A sequel, Jōō Virgin, was serialized in the same magazine from 2009 to 2010. It tells the story of a young girl's challenge at the "Jōō Grand Prix" contest, in which the best kyabakura hostess is promised to win JP¥100,000,000. A television drama adaptation of the same name was broadcast for three seasons on TV Tokyo from 2005 to 2010.

== Media ==
=== Manga ===
Written by Ryō Kurashina and illustrated by Nao Kurebayashi, Jōō was serialized in Shueisha's seinen manga magazine Business Jump from August 12, 2004, to February 1, 2008. Its chapters were collected in twelve tankōbon volumes, released from March 18, 2005, to March 19, 2008.

A sequel, Jōō Virgin (嬢王 Virgin, Jōō Vuājin), was serialized in the same magazine from April 30, 2009, to September 1, 2010. Its chapters were collected in five volumes, released from October 2, 2009, to September 17, 2010.
