= Reinōryokusha Odagiri Kyōko no Uso =

Japanese manga series

- First tankōbon volume cover

霊能力者 小田霧響子の嘘
- Genre: Comedy, mystery
- Manga
- Written by: Shinobu Kaitani
- Published by: Shueisha
- Magazine: Business Jump
- Original run: May 15, 2007 – October 5, 2011
- Volumes: 7
- Television drama
- Directed by: Jota Tsunehiro; Keita Motohashi
- Music by: Kousuke Yamashita
- Original network: TV Asahi
- Original run: October 10, 2010 – December 5, 2010
- Episodes: 9
- icon

Reinōryokusha Odagiri Kyōko no Uso (霊能力者 小田霧響子の嘘; 'The Lies of Kyouko Odagiri the Psychic') is a Japanese manga series written and illustrated by Shinobu Kaitani. It was serialized in Shueisha's seinen manga magazine Business Jump from May 2007 to October 2011, with its chapters collected in seven tankōbon volumes. It was adapted into a nine-episode television drama series, broadcast on TV Asahi in 2010.

== Media ==
=== Manga ===
Written and illustrated by Shinobu Kaitani, Reinōryokusha Odagiri Kyōko no Uso was serialized in Shueisha's seinen manga magazine Business Jump from May 15, 2007, to October 5, 2011, when the magazine ceased its publication. Business Jump was succeeded by Grand Jump, and it was announced that series would continue there; however, no further information was released. Shueisha collected its chapters in seven tankōbon volumes, released from February 19, 2008, to February 24, 2012.

==== Volumes ====
No.	Japanese release date	Japanese ISBN
1	February 19, 2008	978-4-08-877402-2
2	July 18, 2008	978-4-08-877479-4
3	April 17, 2009	978-4-08-877618-7
4	September 17, 2010	978-4-08-877862-4
5	December 5, 2010	978-4-08-879074-9
6	June 17, 2011	978-4-08-879163-0
7	February 24, 2012	978-4-08-879297-2

=== Drama ===
The manga was adapted into a nine-episode television drama series, which was broadcast on TV Asahi from October 10 to December 5, 2010.
