= Shaolin vs. Evil Dead =

2004 Hong Kong film by Gordon Liu

- Directed by: Douglas Kung
- Written by: Ho Yiu-Wang
- Produced by: Jeremy Kai-ping Cheung
- Starring: Gordon Liu
- Cinematography: Chi-kan Kwan
- Edited by: Grand Yip
- Music by: Mak Chun Hung
- Production company: My Way Film Company Limited
- Release date: 16 March 2004 (Hong Kong)
- Running time: 94 minutes
- Country: Hong Kong
- Language: Cantonese

Shaolin vs. Evil Dead
- Traditional Chinese: 少林殭屍
- Simplified Chinese: 少林僵尸
Transcriptions

Shaolin vs. Evil Dead (Shao Lin jiang shi) is a 2004 Hong Kong martial arts vampire film starring Gordon Liu. The title of the film is a play on Liu's 1988 film Shaolin vs. Vampire as well as the American horror franchise Evil Dead, though there is no relationship to those films. The film also heavily references the style of Mr. Vampire, though it has a unique plot.

The film ends abruptly, without resolution, because of a planned sequel, which is previewed in the end credits. The funding for the sequel was approved in 2005, and the second half of the film, Shaolin Vs. Dead: Ultimate Power was released the same year.

== Cast ==
- Gordon Liu as "Pak"
- Fan Siu-Wong as "Hak/Black"
- Jacky Woo
- Shannon Yoh
