= Riki-Oh =

Japanese manga series

- Cover of the first volume

力王 (Riki-Ō)
- Genre: Martial arts; Post-apocalyptic; Thriller
- Manga
- Written by: Masahiko Takajo
- Illustrated by: Tetsuya Saruwatari
- Published by: Shueisha
- Magazine: Business Jump
- Original run: 1987 – 1990
- Volumes: 12
- Original video animation
- Directed by: Satoshi Dezaki
- Studio: Magic Bus
- Released: June 25, 1989 – August 24, 1990
- Runtime: 45 minutes
- Episodes: 2
- Live-action film
- Riki-Oh: The Story of Ricky (1991)
- icon

Riki-Oh (Japanese: 力王, Hepburn: Riki-Ō) is a Japanese manga series written by Masahiko Takajo and illustrated by Tetsuya Saruwatari. It was serialized in Shueisha's seinen manga magazine Business Jump from 1987 to 1990, with its chapters collected in 12 tankōbon volumes. The story follows the titular Riki-Oh, a young man who has learned the martial art of Naike Kenpō from one of Chiang Kai-shek's bodyguards, and has become so strong that he can punch holes through people and solid objects.

A two-episode original video animation (OVA) was released in 1989 and 1990, and a live-action film, Riki-Oh: The Story of Ricky, premiered in 1991.

== Plot ==
The story is set in a post-apocalyptic future where global warming and warfare has left the world struggling, while Japan descended into an economic depression in the 1990s which led to increased crime.

The story centers around Saiga Riki-Oh, blessed with inhuman strength, who, after taking revenge against a yakuza who was responsible for the death of a child who befriended him, ends up in a maximum security prison owned by a private organization. The story follows Riki and his search for his little brother Saiga Nachi, who bears a manji symbol on his right hand and also possesses superhuman strength.

Riki-Oh encounters and battles many deadly opponents with either superhuman strength or martial arts during his travel for avenging his mother and finding his brother.

== Characters ==
Riki-Oh Saiga (雑賀 力王, Saiga Riki-Ō)
Separated from his younger brother Nachi in childhood, Riki-Oh was adopted by the affluent Saiga family and earned a reputation as a violent loner, earning him the nickname "Wolf." Despite his aggressive demeanor, he harbors a kind and sympathetic side. Riki-Oh strongly believes in karma and is ruthless towards wrongdoers. His muscular physique, long hair, and distinctive features, including five bullet wounds on his chest and a scar resembling the hexagram on his right hand, showcase his extraordinary strength and skills. This scar marks his destiny to overthrow his biological father, granting him superhuman strength and expertise in Naike Kenpō (内家拳法; lit. 'Internal Martial Arts'), taught by his old master, Chou Zenki.
Nachi (那智)
Nachi is the younger brother of Riki-Oh. He bears resentment for being abandoned and holds a belief in mercy killing to relieve others from pain. He has cold glare, longer hair, lesser muscles, and has had a scar in the shape of a manji on his right hand since birth. He possesses psychokinetic abilities sourced from his hand and head. Nachi can manipulate objects and unleash energy blasts, capable of disintegrating bodies, but Riki-Oh's hexagram scar can deflect them. Though Nachi often uses his powers for violence, he also demonstrates healing abilities, having restored a child's ability to walk and reportedly healing fighters in the pankration death matches.
Aku-Oh (悪王, Aku-ō)
An android that resembles Riki-Oh in appearance. It was sent on a mission to kill Riki-Oh but, after a long fight in a wood, it was accidentally sucked into quicksand with Riki-Oh with the latter surviving after having carved a shelter in the abdomen of the android.
Aneyama (姉山)
Aneyama is an elderly, homosexual man who maintains a youthful appearance through monthly plastic surgeries. Despite being over 80, he utilizes advanced technology to enhance his strength and incapacitate enemies with patterned bullet shots. Serving as Mukai's right-hand man, he is a sadistic and sexually deviant person with a dark past of brutal torture during World War II. Aneyama harbors intense hatred for Riki-Oh, driven by jealousy and fear. The only person he true values is his deceased sister, and is intolerant of mistakes, mercilessly killing those who fail him, except for his second in command, Dr. Kohinata, whom he tolerates for his competence.
Washizaki (鷲崎)
Washizaki is a high-ranking postal swordsman, leading a secret dictatorship with plans to unleash nuclear weapons and reshape the world. Feeling betrayed by his allies, he goes on a homicidal rampage, slaughtering innocents and adopting an insane persona. In a bid for revenge against Mukai, he aims to kill Nachi and disrupt Mukai's similar plan. Despite defeating Riki-Oh initially, Washizaki faces setbacks as Riki-Oh resists his control and ultimately defeats him. Washizaki's actions, including attempting to harm his own daughter, stem from his descent into madness. Ultimately, Nachi betrays and vaporizes him with an energy beam. Washizaki's legacy lingers as Riki-Oh recalls his ideology while confronting other villains in the series.
Robotomi 560SEL-Mark. II (ロボトミSEL-マークII, Robotomi SEL-Māku II) / Atomic Robo (アトミック・ロボ, Atomikku Robo)
Robotomi is a cyborg who was originally a slave robot constructed from a human body to work in The Cape's nuclear power plant, an environment too dangerous for unmodified humans. Believing that he and the other cyborgs at the plant were being mistreated, he led a revolution against The Cape's government, though this failed. Seeking revenge, he volunteered to fight in the Pankration death match show. He befriends Riki-Oh during this time, and the two eventually face each other, with Riki-Oh coming out victorious. After Riki-Oh saves him from an attempt on his life by Nachi, Robotomi identifies Washizaki as his true enemy. Declaring his humanity, he charged the general, only to be fatally bisected by his sword.
The Baron (男爵, Danshaku)
He is the chief charged with the accomplishment of a plan whose goal is to accelerate the coming of Judgement Day. In order to achieve this goal, he needs to give birth to the so-called "child of destruction", a being created from the union of Nachi's head with the body of Riki-Oh.
Zhāng Shàn-Guǐ (張 善鬼, Chō Zenki)
A Chinese man who stopped Riki's suicide attempt in front of his mother's grave. He later became Riki's master, whom taught him the art of Naike Kenpō. He used to be Chiang Kai-shek's elite bodyguard.
Wáng Měi-Lì (王 美麗, Ō Birei)
Also known as Hisano Akiyama (秋山久乃, Akiyama Hisano). Riki-Oh and Nachi's biological mother, she was executed by hanging for allegedly poisoning thirteen infants 25 years ago. Before her death sentence, with help from a friend, Riki and Nachi managed to escape from prison. She foretold that one day her death will be avenged by her son and that evil will never conquer the good. Although Jewish and Japanese, she uses a Chinese name. Her birth name was Hanna, and was raised in Shanghai with her foster family.

== Media ==
=== Manga ===
Written by Masahiko Takajo and illustrated by Tetsuya Saruwatari, Riki-Oh was serialized in Shueisha's seinen manga magazine Business Jump from 1987 to 1990. Shueisha collected its chapters in 12 tankōbon volumes, released from April 1988 to September 1990. Homesha republished the series in nine volumes from August 1995 to April 1996.

=== Original video animation ===
The series was adapted into a two-part original video animation (OVA) produced by Magic Bus and directed by Satoshi Dezaki; the first part, subtitled Tōkatsu Jigoku (等括地獄; lit. 'The Wall of Hell'), was released on June 25, 1989; the second part, subtitled Horobi no Ko (滅びの子; lit. 'Child of Destruction'), was released on August 24, 1990.

In North America, Media Blasters announced that they had licensed both OVAs in 2006; however, the release was ultimately cancelled due to right issues.

=== Live-action film ===
In 1991, a Hong Kong live-action adaptation titled Riki-Oh: The Story of Ricky was released. The film was directed by Lam Nai-choi and stars Fan Siu-Wong as Ricky Ho.

== Legacy ==
One of the main villains of the series, General Washizaki, was the primary source of inspiration for the design of M. Bison in the Street Fighter series of fighting games.

Riki-Oh has also been cited as an influence on the Mortal Kombat series of fighting games. Similarities include the gory fatality finishing moves, the resemblance between Ricky and Liu Kang, and the X-ray attacks.
