= Winners Circle e Yōkoso =

Japanese manga series

- First tankōbon volume cover

ウイナーズサークルへようこそ (Uināzu Sākuru e Yōkoso)
- Genre: Comedy
- Manga
- Written by: Shinobu Kaitani
- Published by: Shueisha
- Magazine: Jump X (2011–14); Tonari no Young Jump (2014–16)
- Original run: July 25, 2011 – October 28, 2016
- Volumes: 9
- icon

Winners Circle e Yōkoso (Japanese: ウイナーズサークルへようこそ, Hepburn: Uināzu Sākuru e Yōkoso; 'Welcome to the Winners Circle') is a Japanese manga series written and illustrated by Shinobu Kaitani. It was first serialized in Shueisha's Jump X manga magazine from 2011 to 2014, when the magazine ceased publication, and later ran in Tonari no Young Jump online magazine from 2014 to 2016, with its chapters collected in nine tankōbon volumes.

== Publication ==
Written and illustrated by Shinobu Kaitani, Winners Circle e Yōkoso was first serialized in Shueisha's Jump X manga magazine from July 25, 2011, to October 10, 2014, when the magazine ceased its publication. It was then moved to the Tonari no Young Jump online magazine, where it ran until its conclusion on October 28, 2016. Shueisha collected its chapters in nine tankōbon volumes, released from April 10, 2012, to November 18, 2016.

=== Volumes ===
| No. | Japanese release date | Japanese ISBN |
|---|---|---|
| 1 | April 10, 2012 | 978-4-08-879309-2 |
| 2 | November 19, 2012 | 978-4-08-879469-3 |
| 3 | May 17, 2013 | 978-4-08-879598-0 |
| 4 | November 8, 2013 | 978-4-08-879693-2 |
| 5 | May 9, 2014 | 978-4-08-879802-8 |
| 6 | November 19, 2014 | 978-4-08-890045-2 |
| 7 | May 19, 2015 | 978-4-08-890196-1 |
| 8 | November 19, 2015 | 978-4-08-890311-8 |
| 9 | November 18, 2016 | 978-4-08-890495-5 |
