= Kung Fu Fighter =

2007 Hong Kong film by Wing Kin Yip and Yongjian Ye

- Chinese: 功夫无敌
- Directed by: Yongjian Ye; Ken Yip Wing-Kin
- Written by: Cyrus Cheng Tsz-To, Chu Jun-Yue, Yuan Li-Jiang
- Story by: Cyrus Cheng Tsz-To, Chu Jun-Yue, Yuan Li-Jian
- Produced by: Sharon Yeung Pan-Pan
- Starring: Vanness Wu; Fan Siu-wong; Lam Tze-chung
- Cinematography: Kwan Chi-Kan
- Edited by: Grand Yip Wai-Keung
- Music by: Brother Hung
- Production companies: Brilliant Emperor Production; My Way Film Company Limited
- Distributed by: Sil-Metropole Organization
- Release date: 27 April 2007
- Running time: 100 minutes
- Country: Hong Kong
- Languages: Cantonese, Mandarin, English

Kung Fu Fighter (Chinese: 功夫无敌) is a 2007 Hong Kong Kung Fu movie directed by Wing Kin Yip and Yongjian Ye.

== Plot summary ==
Ma Vanness Wu a young man travels to looks for his father in Shanghai hoping to learn the Kung Fu from him and later in that process he discover having an hidden super human strength and abilities, he use the power against the Shanghai gangsters and their group of ruthless warriors.

== Cast ==
- Vanness Wu Chien-Hao as Manik
- Fan Siu-Wong as Sam Long
- Bruce Leung Siu-Lung as Uncle Yeah
- Lam Tze-Chung as Porky
- Danny Chan Kwok-Kwan as Don Ching
- Emme Wong Yi-Man as Goldie
- Tenky Tin Kai-Man as Sam Cho
- Chan Sek as Rocky
- Mo Mei-Lin as Doctor
- Chen Yong-Xia as Auntie Lan
- Kit Cheung Man-Kit as Wu Long
- John Zhang Jin as Xi Long
- Fan Man-Kit as Da Fay
- Li Hui as Rainbow
- Wang Jian-Jun as Wizard
- Chen Ting-Hui as Siu Fay
- Liu Ai-Ju as Ling
- Ni Yu-Cheng as Seer
- Karen Cheung Bo-Man as Miko
- Yang Yi-Fan as Iron Head
- Zhao Shuai as Wingo
- Ruan Li-Ming as Caron
- Li Wan-Ting as Cat Girl
- Chun Yu Shan Shan as Willow
