= One Outs =

Japanese manga series

- First tankōbon volume cover, featuring Toa Tokuchi
- Genre: Gambling; Psychological; Sports
- Manga
- Written by: Shinobu Kaitani
- Published by: Shueisha
- Imprint: Young Jump Comics
- Magazine: Business Jump
- Original run: 1998 – 2006
- Volumes: 19
- Manga

One Outs: Miwaku no All-Star-hen
- Written by: Shinobu Kaitani
- Published by: Shueisha
- Imprint: Young Jump Comics
- Magazine: Business Jump
- Original run: 2008 – 2009
- Volumes: 1 (Note: Numbered as the 20th volume of the overall series)
- Anime television series
- Directed by: Yuzo Sato
- Produced by: Toshio Nakatani; Manabu Tamura
- Written by: Hideo Takayashiki
- Music by: Akihiko Matsumoto
- Studio: Madhouse
- Original network: Nippon TV
- Original run: October 8, 2008 – April 1, 2009
- Episodes: 25
- icon

One Outs (stylized in all caps) is a Japanese baseball-themed manga series written and illustrated by Shinobu Kaitani. It was serialized in Shueisha's seinen manga magazine Business Jump from 1998 to 2006, and was followed by a short-term sequel, One Outs: Miwaku no All-Star-hen, from 2008 to 2009; the overall chapters were collected in 20 tankōbon volumes. A 25-episode anime television series adaptation, produced by Madhouse and directed by Yuzo Sato, aired on Nippon TV from October 2008 to April 2009.

== Plot ==
The Saitama Lycaons are the weakest team in the Japanese league. Hiromichi Kojima, the Lycaons' star batter, forms a training camp in Okinawa to try for his last attempt at a championship after 21 years. When the minor league pitcher training with Kojima becomes injured, him and Kojima's trainer goes to look for a replacement, but run into trouble by participating in the "One Outs" game, where a pitcher and batter duel 1-on-1 with money on the line. The next day, Kojima arrives to avenge his teammates and meets Tōa Tokuchi, who appears to have no special pitching skills, but defeats Kojima easily and causes him to enter seclusion to re-evaluate himself as a professional player. Later, Tokuchi accepts a rematch after Kojima raised the stakes, proclaiming he will retire immediately if he loses, but he will "take" Tokuchi's right arm to make sure he will never gamble on baseball again if Tokuchi loses. This time, Tokuchi experiences his very first loss and offers Kojima his right arm to have it broken. Instead, Kojima tells him he never intended to break it, and asks Tokuchi to join the Lycaons and use his unique pitching ability to take the Lycaons to the championship. Soon, Tokuchi meets Saikawa, the greedy owner of the Lycaons who only cares about the team making a profit. Saikawa is reluctant to give Tokuchi any sort of significant salary due to his inexperience as a professional, but Tokuchi offers an unusual proposal. He proposes the 'One Outs contract', a performance-based pay where he gets 5,000,000 yen for every out he pitches, but loses ¥50,000,000 for every run he gives up.

Later on in the baseball season, it is revealed that even the "One Outs contract" was done for the benefit of the team as Saikawa had no plans to keep the Lycaons and set up a deal to sell the team to the Tronpos company. Knowing this, Tokuchi formed an alliance with Tronpos and provided financial intel on Saikawa in exchange for financial backing. With this intel, Tronpos is able to make sure they are able to purchase the Lycaons as cheaply as possible by spreading rumors to dissuade other corporations from bidding. Unfortunately for the Lycaons, Tronpos also has no plans on proceeding with the current lineup and will replace all players after purchasing them. The Tronpos chairman made a mistake by believing Tokuchi to be his supporter and told Tokuchi his intended bid, to which Tokuchi responded with a last minute counter-offer.

For triple the bid, Tokuchi becomes the new owner of the Lycaons. Though there is heavy dissent in the team due to his dubious nature, Tokuchi starts to implement a wide variety of changes, most notably the L-Ticket. It is the old admission ticket with a new 1.5× admission fee, but with the promise of a full refund if the Lycaons loses the game. Additionally, the spectators can make up to five votes for the MVP on the ticket, which will directly influence the new player salaries by paying 200 yen per vote. Though the Lycaons are in chaos with the new changes, the team slowly realizes that these changes are what the team needs in order to become strong enough to win the championship.

== Characters ==
=== Main characters ===
Toa Tokuchi (渡久地 東亜, Tokuchi Tōa)
Voiced by: Masato Hagiwara
A successful gambler and pitcher in the game called "One Outs". After losing a game of One Outs for the first time ever to Kojima, he joins the Lycaons with an odd contract, the One Outs contract, that decides his pay based on his performance. He uses his perceptive intellect to manipulate professional baseball, and becomes a professional baseball team pitcher. In that role he psychologically manipulates and intimidates the batters he faces along with playing high-stakes psychological and intellectual battles against his own antagonistic team owner, competing team coaches, and underhanded opposing teams.
Hiromichi Kojima (児島 弘道, Kojima Hiromichi)
Voiced by: Tsutomu Isobe
Kojima is the cleanup batter for the professional baseball team, Saikyou Saitama Lycaons. He is defeated by Toa during his time at the training camp after challenging Toa to avenge his relief pitcher, Nakane. After his defeat, he goes into the forest to train himself mentally against Toa but as he trained he injured his wrist. Even with the injury, he decides to challenges Toa to a rematch with the bet that if he wins, he would take Toa's arm. With the One Outs game ending in a do or die pitch, Kojima resolves that he couldn't lose, getting in the way of the ball and making the pitch count as a deadball. He wins the match because of this, albeit not without contention. Toa admits defeat and Kojima makes Toa join the Lycaons, effectively taking Toa's arm and disabling him from gambling ever again in a One Outs game.
Satoshi Ideguchi (出口 智志, Ideguchi Satoshi)
Voiced by: Kappei Yamaguchi
He is the catcher of the Saikyou Saitama Lycaons and is the first to notice Tokuchi's talents as he catches Tokuchi's simple-looking fastball pitches. Apart from Kojima, Ideguchi is the other key member of the Lycaons and stands as the voice of reason in disputes. Due to Ideguchi's trust in Tokuchi, Tokuchi also trusts Ideguchi enough to include him in his plans. Together, they dismantle the opposing team's offense and tricks.
Tsuneo Saikawa (彩川 恒雄, Saikawa Tsuneo)
Voiced by: Kenji Utsumi
The owner of the Saikyou Saitama Lycaons team. He is more interested in gaining money than getting the Lycaons to win. He forms the One Outs contract with Toa Tokuchi in order to avoid paying a salary to Tokuchi, and to increase the Lycaons sale value by increasing their profitability.

=== Supporting ===
Yuuzaburou Mihara (三原 雄三郎, Mihara Yūzaburō)
Voiced by: Shōzō Iizuka
The manager of the Saikyou Saitama Lycaons. He obediently obeys every order given to him by the owner. Mihara genuinely wishes for the team to succeed and begins to oppose the owner when the Lycaons start to win their games thanks to Tokuchi.
Jun'ichi Kawanaka (河中 純一, Kawanaka Jun'ichi)
Voiced by: Takuma Terashima
The Fingers' starting pitcher and the Rookie of Year for the year before. He also notices how terrifying Toa is when he pitches, he urges the team to try and take a hit, but the result is still the same and his team loses the match. He is named by Takami of the Mariners to be the strongest pitcher in the league.
Dennis Johnson
Voiced by: Taiten Kusunoki
A foreigner who was scouted by Coach Shiroka of the Bugaboos during a 100 m track and field event. Though he fell behind in the race, he was able to lead up to the 30m mark. Coach Shiroka explained that since the distance between bases was about 27m, Johnson is the baseball world's fastest man. Johnson is also known for his ability to bunt, and sports an intimidating tattoo around his right eye.
The Chiba Mariners
The strongest team in Japan for the last three years. This team goes against the Lycaons with three consecutive games, with their strongest cleanup crew comprising Takami Itsuki, Thomas and Brooklyn.
Itsuki Takami (高見 樹, Takami Itsuki)
Voiced by: Masaya Matsukaze
One of the cleanup batters in the team "Chiba Mariners", he is known to be a prodigy in baseball and his eyes have the best in motion vision in the baseball world. He is the best hitter in the entire league.

== Media ==
=== Manga ===
Written and illustrated by Shinobu Kaitani, One Outs was serialized in Shueisha's seinen manga magazine Business Jump from 1998 to 2006. Shueisha collected its chapters in nineteen tankōbon volumes released from June 18, 1999, to October 19, 2006. A sequel, titled One Outs: Miwaku no All-Star-hen (ONE OUTS 疑惑のオールスター戦編; lit. 'One Outs: The Enthralling All-Star Edition'), was serialized from 2008 to 2009; its chapters were collected in a single tankōbon volume (numbered as the 20th volume of the overall series), released on February 19, 2009.

==== Volumes ====
No.	Release date	ISBN
1	June 18, 1999	978-4-08-875799-5
2	November 19, 1999	978-4-08-875854-1
3	April 19, 2000	978-4-08-876012-4
4	December 11, 2000	978-4-08-876107-7
5	August 17, 2001	978-4-08-876197-8
6	December 10, 2001	978-4-08-876248-7
7	June 19, 2002	978-4-08-876312-5
8	November 19, 2002	978-4-08-876370-5
9	April 18, 2003	978-4-08-876430-6
10	October 17, 2003	978-4-08-876517-4
11	March 19, 2004	978-4-08-876588-4
12	August 19, 2004	978-4-08-876662-1
13	January 19, 2005	978-4-08-876747-5
14	June 17, 2005	978-4-08-876813-7
15	November 18, 2005	978-4-08-876885-4
16	April 19, 2006	978-4-08-877073-4
17	June 19, 2006	978-4-08-877099-4
18	August 18, 2006	978-4-08-877137-3
19	October 19, 2006	978-4-08-877162-5
20	February 19, 2009	978-4-08-877602-6

=== Anime ===
An anime television series adaptation by Madhouse was announced in August 2008. Produced by Nippon TV, D.N. Dream Partners, VAP, and Madhouse, the series was directed by Yuzo Sato, with Hideo Takayashiki handling series composition, Takahiro Umehara designing the characters, and Akihiko Matsumoto composing the music. Kunihiko Sakurai, Haruhito Takada, and Masaki Hinata served as additional character designers. The series ran for 25 episodes on Nippon TV from October 8, 2008, to April 1, 2009. (Note: Nippon TV listed the air dates for the series on Tuesday at 24:59, which is effectively Wednesday at 0:59 a.m. JST.) The opening song is "Bury", performed by Pay Money to My Pain, and the ending song is "Moment", performed by Tribal Chair.

==== Episodes ====
No.	Title	Directed by	Written by	Original release date
1	"The Mysterious Man"; Transliteration: "Nazo no Otoko" (Japanese: 謎の男)	Kazuhiro Yoneda	Hideo Takayashiki	October 8, 2008
Kojima is in his last year in the major league and has never won a championship. He and a few teammates go on a training camp to practice. Their only pitcher injures his finger and can no longer pitch to Kojima. The remaining teammates feel bad and begin to search for a new pitcher quickly. Who they find and where they find this new pitcher is not where they had expected.
2	"Gambler"; Transliteration: "Shōbushi" (Japanese: 勝負師)	Shigetaka Ikeda	Hideo Takayashiki	October 15, 2008
The One Outs battle between Kojima and Toa Tokuchi does not end according to Kojima's wishes, leading him to seek enlightenment to beat Toa in the mountains. Kojima returns and rechallenges Toa Tokuchi, betting his pro career against Toa's arm.
3	"One Outs Contract"; Transliteration: "Wann Autsu Keiyaku" (Japanese: ワンナウツ契約)	Tetsuo Yajima	Hideo Takayashiki	October 22, 2008
Kojima lets himself get hit in order not to lose. He gets Tokuchi to join the Lycaons. Tokuchi negotiates an astounding contract that looks very much to be in his disadvantage with the Owner of the Lycaons. The Owner is shocked when he receives news of the amount he is to pay Tokuchi after the pre-season game, which is the first game Tokuchi plays in. In the second game, which is against the Fingers, Tokuchi retires all the batters.
4	"Nine's Qualifications"; Transliteration: "Nain no Shikaku" (Japanese: ナインの資格)	Kazuki Onogi	Hideo Takayashiki	October 29, 2008
The Lycaons play against the Eagles. There is a bribed player within their midst. Tokuchi tells the player to stop playing. The Lycaons are now at a disadvantage, but fight to get the points. Tokuchi allows the player to return at the end of the episode.
5	"Hope"; Transliteration: "Kibō" (Japanese: 希望)	Nanako Shimazaki	Hideo Takayashiki	November 5, 2008
The player, Yoshida, plays excellently. Tokuchi becomes tired and pitches a dead ball. Yoshida takes over him. The Lycaons win the game. Four more conditions are added to Tokuchi's contract. The next game they play is against a very strong team, the Mariners. He pitches first and walks the first two batters, an unexpected action.
6	"Low Spinning Ball"; Transliteration: "Tei-kaiten Sutorēto" (Japanese: 低回転ストレート)	Masahiro Hosoda	Mitsutaka Hirota	November 12, 2008
Two out of the Mariners' three strong batters are retired by Tokuchi. Takami notices an oddity about Tokuchi's fastballs and explains to his team why it's different. With what Takami has advised them to do, they start to hit the fastballs, but they have yet to score. Tokuchi does something unexpected and Takami is struck out at the third pitch.
7	"Trick & Trap"	Kazuhiro Yoneda	Mitsutaka Hirota	November 19, 2008
Takami realises Tokuchi's weakness-his stamina. Tokuchi is forced to push himself. The game goes past the 9th inning. Kojima decides to bat. Tokuchi tells Kojima something. Kojima manages to hit the pitch. The Lycaons win the game. The next game against the Mariners, the Mariners' batters are able to hit Tokuchi's pitches. Takami suspects that Tokuchi has a plan, and at the end of the episode, manages to figure it out.
8	"Foul Play"; Transliteration: "Hansoku Kassen" (Japanese: 反則合戦)	Shigetaka Ikeda	Hideo Takayashiki	November 26, 2008
Tokuchi plays for time while the Mariners rush to reach the fifth inning. When it's the Mariners's turn to defend, Tokuchi tells his team to tie with the Mariners. They manage to do so.
9	"Settlement"; Transliteration: "Kecchaku" (Japanese: 決着)	Tetsuo Yajima	Hideo Takayashiki	December 3, 2008
The 4th inning ends with the Lycaons in the lead by one point. The Mariners underestimate Tokuchi, thinking he'll have trouble pitching in the rain. Instead, he turns it to his advantage. The game ends with the mariners forfeiting the match, and the Lycaons winning.
10	"Strategist vs. Gambler"; Transliteration: "Chishō VS Shōbushi" (Japanese: 知将VS勝負師)	Naoki Murata	Mitsutaka Hirota	December 10, 2008
The Lycaons are up against the Bugaboos. The Bugaboos have a new team manager, one who is known as Shirooka the Strategist. In the midst of the game, Tokuchi is placed in an unexpected position in defense. Then, Manager Shirooka sends out a new player, Johnson, who is a very fast runner.
11	"The World's Fastest Man"; Transliteration: "Sekai Saisoku no Otoko" (Japanese: 世界最速の男)	Nanako Shimazaki	Mitsutaka Hirota	December 17, 2008
Johnson successfully steals home while Tokuchi is the pitcher, and Tokuchi has given up his first run as a professional. Tokuchi talks to the team about the way to stop Johnson. Tokuchi bats near the end of the episode.
12	"Invincible Pitching Style"; Transliteration: "Hissatsu Tōhō" (Japanese: 必殺投法)	Kim Min-sun	Hideo Takayashiki	December 24, 2008
Tokuchi discovers the weakness in Johnson's defense. Tokuchi's plan to stop Johnson is set into motion. However, Tokuchi has another plan in addition. The plan works. Later, when the Bugaboos are attacking at the ninth inning, Johnson taunts Tokuchi and Tokuchi decides to battle it out with Johnson. Tokuchi wins the battle and the Lycaons win the game. The episode ends with Tokuchi saying that the real battle will be tomorrow.
13	"Sealed Legs"; Transliteration: "Fūin Sareta Ashi" (Japanese: 封印された足)	Masahiro Hosoda	Hideo Takayashiki	January 7, 2009
Johnson is the leadoff batter for the third game. Tokuchi is sent to pitch while Johnson is at third base. Tokuchi intimidates the batter. Shirooka decides to change the strategy. Tokuchi is making errors at his position at first base. Another strategy to stop Johnson is carried out. However, Shirooka carries out a plan to counter it.
14	"9-Person Infield"; Transliteration: "Kyū-nin Naiya" (Japanese: 9人内野)	Miho Hirao	Mitsutaka Hirota	January 14, 2009
Tokuchi shifts the outfielders defending positions. Tokuchi intimidates the batters. Shirooka realises that Tokuchi is really a terrifying person. The episode ends with the game going into extra innings.
15	"1 Player Infield"; Transliteration: "Hitori Naiya" (Japanese: 1人内野)	Shigetaka Ikeda	Hideo Takayashiki	January 21, 2009
Game 3 in a 3 game series between the Lycaons and the Bugaboos has entered extra innings with the score tied 0-0. Tokuchi uses the manager Mihara Yuuzaburou's desire to win this game to break the owner's hold over the manager. With the manager no longer obeying every order that is given to him by the owner, Tokuchi is free to pitch the remainder of the game against the order of the owner. Tokuchi uses the rest of the game to break down every aspect of Johnson's game showing that nothing about him is to be feared, not his batting ability or his speed. The Lycaons go on to win the game 1-0 thus winning the series against the Bugaboos, 2-1.
16	"Trick Stadium"; Transliteration: "Torikku Sutajiamu" (Japanese: トリックスタジアム)	Tetsuo Yajima	Hideo Takayashiki	January 28, 2009
Tokuchi explains why he was so sure his plan would work. Tokuchi tells Kojima there is a simpler way to defeat Johnson, and the method is shown when Kojima watches the game where the Bugaboos go against Blue Mars, the Lycaons next opponent. The owner of the Lycaons talk with a mysterious person. Tokuchi attends the briefing on the BlueMars. Tokuchi stays back and watches the video, and says to Kojima that the Blue Mars are cheaters. In the game, though the Lycaons were leading, the Blue Mars caught up.
17	"The Deceiving Knuckleball"; Transliteration: "Inchiki Nakkuru" (Japanese: インチキナックル)	Nanako Shimazaki	Hideo Takayashiki	February 4, 2009
The Lycaons are shocked and become discouraged when the Blue Mars tie them. The manager Mihara tries to lift their spirits. The Lycaons end up losing to the Blue Mars in the first game. Tokuchi states that he can pitch the deceiving knuckleballs, and then shows the team why the pitches are fake knuckleballs. The team becomes angry when they know that the BlueMars were cheating.
18	"Stolen Sign"; Transliteration: "Nusumareta Sain" (Japanese: 盗まれたサイン)	Masahiro Hosoda	Mitsutaka Hirota	February 11, 2009
Tokuchi tells Ideguchi that their signs are being stolen. Tokuchi, Kojima and Ideguchi search for the signal that tell the BlueMars the Lycaons's signs. Tokuchi decides to use the Blue Mars sign stealing against them.
19	"Shady Signal"; Transliteration: "Yami Shingō" (Japanese: ヤミ信号)	Satoshi Nakagawa	Mitsutaka Hirota	February 18, 2009
Tokuchi, Ideguchi and Kojima continue to search for the way the Blue Mars are stealing the Lycaons's signs. Tokuchi discovers the trick behind their shady signal. Tokuchi goes off to turn their sign stealing against them. Since the manager is unwilling to listen to Tokuchi, Tokuchi finds a way to convince manager Mihara.
20	"Ridicule"; Transliteration: "Honrō" (Japanese: 翻弄)	Miho Hirao	Hideo Takayashiki	February 26, 2009
The manager listens to Tokuchi. Tokuchi does something without the manager's knowledge that enables them to get a point. The Lycaons manage to take the lead. The Owner has a plan to get Tokuchi's earnings to disappear.
21	"Disclosure"; Transliteration: "Rōei" (Japanese: 漏洩)	Shigetaka Ikeda	Hideo Takayashiki	March 4, 2009
Tokuchi suggests changing signs. In the second game, yet the Blue Mars are still able to hit the pitches. Ideguchi realises that their signs are being stolen. At the end of the episode, Tokuchi states that they are being wiretapped.
22	"Wiretapped"; Transliteration: "Tōchō" (Japanese: 盗聴)	Tetsuo Yajima	Mitsutaka Hirota	March 11, 2009
Tokuchi states that they have been wiretapped. He realises where the wiretap is. The assistant manager for the BlueMars is revealed. The Lycaons manage to lessen the point difference.
23	"Capture"; Transliteration: "Kōryaku" (Japanese: 攻略)	Kazuhiro Yoneda	Mitsutaka Hirota	March 18, 2009
Tokuchi's plan is accidentally revealed. Williams is sent to pitch in the final inning. Tokuchi has a plan to counter the fake knuckleball and goes to bat. At the end of the episode, he manages to steal up to second base.
24	"Conspiracy"; Transliteration: "Inbō" (Japanese: 陰謀)	Masahiro Hosoda	Hideo Takayashiki	March 25, 2009
The Blue Mars catcher realises that Tokuchi knows about the fake knuckleballs. The Lycaons take the lead. The owner's plan to clear the amount Tokuchi has earned is explained. It is then set into motion when Tokuchi goes to bat. Tokuchi retaliates in an unexpected way. The episode ends with Tokuchi lying on the ground.
25	"Beyond the Triumph"; Transliteration: "Shōri no Saki ni..." (Japanese: 勝利の先に…)	Yuzo Sato	Hideo Takayashiki	April 1, 2009
Tokuchi is uninjured. He goes back to the mound to pitch. The Blue Mars try to frame him. The batter that accused Tokuchi finds the tables turned, and in order to avoid the Blue Mars being found of cheating, Tokuchi tells him to kneel down as an apology. The Lycaons go on to win the game and are no longer last place. But this is just the beginning. The aim is the championship.

== See also ==
- Gambling in Japan
