= The Apostles (film) =

2013 film directed by Joe Chien

- Directed by: Joe Chien
- Starring: Josie Ho; Fan Hsia; Lam Suet; Lam Chi-chung
- Release date: January 17, 2014
- Running time: 91 minutes
- Country: China
- Language: Mandarin
- Box office: US$1.13 million (China)

The Apostles (Chinese: 诡镇) is a 2014 Chinese horror thriller film directed by Joe Chien. It was released in China on 17 January.

== Cast ==
- Josie Ho
- Fan Hsia
- Lam Suet
- Lam Chi-chung

== Reception ==
The film has grossed US$1.13 million at the Chinese box office.
