= Amai Seikatsu =

Japanese manga series by Hikaru Yuzuki

- First tankōbon volume cover, featuring Yumika Wakamiya (center), and Shinsuke Edo (bottom right)

甘い生活
- Genre: Romantic comedy
- Manga
- Written by: Hikaru Yuzuki
- Published by: Shueisha
- Magazine: Business Jump
- Original run: 1990 – 2011
- Volumes: 40
- Manga

Amai Seikatsu: 2nd Season
- Written by: Hikaru Yuzuki
- Published by: Shueisha
- Magazine: Grand Jump
- Original run: November 16, 2011 – June 5, 2024
- Volumes: 19
- icon

Amai Seikatsu (甘い生活; lit. 'Sweet Life') is a Japanese manga series written and illustrated by Hikaru Yuzuki. It was serialized in Shueisha's seinen manga magazine Business Jump from 1990 to 2011, with its chapters collected in 40 tankōbon volumes. A sequel, Amai Seikatsu: 2nd Season, was serialized in Grand Jump from November 2011 to June 2024, with its chapters collected in 19 tankōbon volumes.

== Story ==
Shinosuke, a young part-time employee, unexpectedly rises through the ranks of the lingerie company PIXY after catching the attention of its eccentric CEO, Shōzō Hino. His journey begins when he returns a misdelivered pair of elderly women's underwear, displaying an honesty that impresses Hino. Soon, it becomes apparent that Shinosuke possesses a peculiar gift—with just a touch, he can determine whether a woman's lingerie fits properly, even instinctively knowing her exact measurements. His touch also induces an inexplicable, pleasurable sensation, drawing women back to him, though his own innocence leaves him unaware of the effect he has. As events unfold, a romance blossoms between Shinosuke and Yumika Wakamiya, Hino's reserved yet devoted private secretary.

== Characters ==
Shinsuke Edo (江戸 伸介, Edo Shinsuke)
Shinosuke is a 21-year-old man who works as lingerie designer.
Yumika Wakamiya (若宮 弓香, Wakamiya Yumika)
Shōzō Hino (日野 昇造, Hino Shōzō)
Miya Kōno (河野 美也, Kōno Miya)
Chitose (千登世, Chitose)
Tomoe Hino (日野巴, Hino Tomoe)
Sayo Tachibana (立花小夜, Tachibana Sayo)
Shizuka Hosino (星野静, Hosino Shizuka)

== Publication ==
Written and illustrated by Hikaru Yuzuki, Amai Seikatsu was serialized in Shueisha's seinen manga magazine Business Jump from 1990 to 2011. Its chapters were collected in 40 tankōbon volumes, released from December 13, 1990, to August 19, 2011.

A sequel, titled Amai Seikatsu: 2nd Season, was serialized in Shueisha's Grand Jump magazine from November 16, 2011, to June 5, 2024. Shueisha collected its chapters in 19 tankōbon volumes, released from April 19, 2012, to September 19, 2024.

=== Amai Seikatsu ===
No.	Release date	ISBN
01	December 13, 1990	978-4-08-861871-5
02	April 19, 1991	978-4-08-861872-2
03	September 19, 1991	978-4-08-861873-9
04	February 19, 1992	978-4-08-861874-6
05	July 17, 1992	978-4-08-861875-3
06	January 19, 1993	978-4-08-861876-0
07	June 18, 1993	978-4-08-861877-7
08	January 19, 1994	978-4-08-861878-4
09	September 19, 1994	978-4-08-861879-1
10	May 19, 1995	978-4-08-861880-7
11	December 8, 1995	978-4-08-875431-4
12	July 19, 1996	978-4-08-875455-0
13	February 19, 1997	978-4-08-875456-7
14	September 19, 1997	978-4-08-875566-3
15	March 19, 1998	978-4-08-875632-5
16	November 19, 1998	978-4-08-875725-4
17	May 19, 1999	978-4-08-875788-9
18	December 13, 1999	978-4-08-875863-3
19	September 19, 2000	978-4-08-876066-7
20	June 19, 2001	978-4-08-876173-2
21	December 10, 2001	978-4-08-876250-0
22	June 19, 2002	978-4-08-876314-9
23	November 19, 2002	978-4-08-876369-9
24	April 18, 2003	978-4-08-876429-0
25	October 17, 2003	978-4-08-876516-7
26	April 19, 2004	978-4-08-876597-6
27	September 17, 2004	978-4-08-876678-2
28	March 18, 2005	978-4-08-876775-8
29	October 19, 2005	978-4-08-876870-0
30	May 19, 2006	978-4-08-877086-4
31	December 19, 2006	978-4-08-877192-2
32	May 18, 2007	978-4-08-877266-0
33	November 19, 2007	978-4-08-877355-1
34	April 4, 2008	978-4-08-877431-2
35	November 19, 2008	978-4-08-877550-0
36	May 19, 2009	978-4-08-877650-7
37	November 19, 2009	978-4-08-877764-1
38	May 19, 2010	978-4-08-877860-0
39	November 19, 2011	978-4-08-879063-3
40	August 19, 2011	978-4-08-879194-4

=== Amai Seikatsu: 2nd Season ===
No.	Release date	ISBN
01	April 19, 2012	978-4-08-879323-8
02	October 19, 2012	978-4-08-879445-7
03	June 19, 2013	978-4-08-879605-5
04	February 19, 2014	978-4-08-879763-2
05	November 19, 2014	978-4-08-890044-5
06	August 19, 2015	978-4-08-890220-3
07	December 18, 2015	978-4-08-890337-8
08	July 19, 2016	978-4-08-890475-7
09	June 19, 2017	978-4-08-890692-8
10	May 18, 2018	978-4-08-891005-5
11	December 19, 2018	978-4-08-891106-9
12	May 17, 2019	978-4-08-891262-2
13	December 19, 2019	978-4-08-891454-1
14	December 17, 2021	978-4-08-892181-5
15	January 19, 2022	978-4-08-892202-7
16	May 19, 2023	978-4-08-892760-2
17	January 18, 2024	978-4-08-893148-7
18	July 18, 2024	978-4-08-893318-4
19	September 19, 2024	978-4-08-893318-4

== See also ==
- Minna Agechau, another manga series by the same author
