= Shinobu Kaitani =

Japanese manga artist (born 1967)

Shinobu Kaitani 甲斐谷 忍
- Born: September 24, 1967 (age 59) Kagoshima City, Kagoshima Prefecture, Japan
- Area: Manga artist
- Notable works: One Outs; Liar Game
- Awards: 42nd Tezuka Award

Shinobu Kaitani (Japanese: 甲斐谷 忍, Hepburn: Kaitani Shinobu; born September 24, 1967) is a Japanese manga artist. He is known for his works One Outs and Liar Game.

== Early life ==
Kaitani is from Kagoshima City, Kagoshima Prefecture. He graduated from Kagoshima Prefectural Konan High School and from Department of Electronics Engineering, Faculty of Engineering, Kagoshima University. He received the 2nd Prize of the 42nd Tezuka Award in 1991 and made his debut as a professional manga artist in 1993.

== Works ==
- Midoriyama Police Gang (1994, 2 volumes)
- Sommelier (1996–1999, 9 volumes)
- One Outs (1998–2006, 20 volumes)
- Liar Game (2005–2015, 19 volumes)
- Reinōryokusha Odagiri Kyōko no Uso (2007–2011, 7 volumes)
- Liar Game - Roots of A (2008, 1 volume)
- Winners Circle e Yōkoso (2011–2016, 9 volumes)
- Muteki no Hito (2015–2016, 4 volumes)
- New Nobunaga Chronicles (2019–2021, 8 volumes)
- Kamo no Negi ni wa Doku ga Aru -Kamo Kyōju no "Ningen" Keizagaku Kōgi- (2022–present, with Takeshi Natsuhara)
- Liar Game: The Last Game (2026-Present)
