= Lam Chi-chung =

Hong Kong actor

Lam Chi Chung
- 林子聰
- Born: British Hong Kong
- Years active: 1988–present

Chinese name
- Traditional Chinese: 林子聰
- Simplified Chinese: 林子聪
Transcriptions
Standard Mandarin
- Hanyu Pinyin: Lín Zǐcōng
Yue: Cantonese
- Jyutping: lam4 zi2 cung1

Lam Chi-chung (simplified Chinese: 林子聪; traditional Chinese: 林子聰; pinyin: Lín Zǐcōng) is a Hong Kong actor.

== Partial filmography ==
- The Sexy Guys (2019)
- The Incredible Monk 3 (2019)
- Monkey King - The Volcano (2019)
- Flirting Scholar from the Future (2019)
- A Home with a View (2019)
- She's a Man. He's a Woman (2019)
- Crazy Hammer (2018)
- A Bird Frightened of a Bow (2018)
- Kung Fu League (2018)
- Fake Partner (2018)
- Million Demons City (2018)
- The Incredible Monk (2018)
- Hello Miss Bai (2017)
- Graduation Journey (2017)
- Winning Buddha (2017)
- Kick Ball (2017)
- Funny Soccer (2016)
- The Mermaid (2016)
- The Eight Immortals in School (2016)
- iGirl (2016)
- House of Wolves (2016)
- Dot 2 Dot (2014)
- Flirting in the Air (2014)
- The Apostles (2014)
- Mortician (2013)
- A Style of Men in Beijing (2013)
- The Adventures of Jinbao (2012)
- Everything Is Nothing (2012)
- Ultra Reinforcement (2012)
- Marrying a Perfect Man (2012)
- Racer Legend (2011)
- Big Big Man (2011)
- Tiger Must Also Marry (2010)
- The Haunting Lover (2010)
- Once Upon a Chinese Classic (2010)
- Fortune King is Coming to Town! (2010)
- Flirting Scholar 2 (2010)
- On His Majesty's Secret Service (2009)
- Kung Fu Chefs (2009)
- The Luckiest Man (2008)
- Shaolin Girl (2008)
- CJ7 (2008)
- Dancing Lion (2007)
- Kung Fu Fighter (2007)
- My Kung-Fu Sweetheart (2006)
- Kung Fu Mahjong (2005)
- Kung Fu Hustle (2004) - Bone (Sing's Sidekick)
- Love Is a Many Stupid Thing (2004) - Fatty
- Cat and Mouse (2003)
- Women from Mars (2002)
- Beauty and the Breast (2002) - Choi
- Shaolin Soccer (2001) - Light Weight Vest
- I'll Call You -(2006) - director and screenwriter
