= Stone Age Warriors =

1991 Hong Kong film by Stanley Tong

- Film poster
- 魔域飛龍
- Directed by: Stanley Tong
- Written by: Stanley Tong
- Produced by: Stanley Tong
- Starring: Nina Li Chi; Elaine Lui; Fan Siu-Wong
- Cinematography: Huang Wen-Yun; Wang Yung-Lung
- Production company: Golden Gate Film Production
- Distributed by: D & B Film Distribution
- Release date: 25 April 1991
- Running time: 92 minutes
- Country: British Hong Kong
- Language: Cantonese

Stone Age Warriors (Chinese: 魔域飛龍, Moh yu fei long) is a 1991 Cantonese-language Hong Kong action film directed by Stanley Tong in his directorial debut.

== Plot ==
After Hiroshi Nakamura and other treasure hunters in New Guinea are found and attacked by natives, Hong Kong insurance investigator Lucy Wong faces pressure at work for accepting Hiroshi's application for a life insurance policy when the court demands payout of $50,000 in benefits from his $6,500,000 policy within 14 days. Lucy pretends to be Hiroshi's pregnant girlfriend to obtain his whereabouts from the beneficiary, his daughter Eko, an actress in Japan. Together the two head to Indonesia, his last known whereabouts, where Eko forces travel agent Abdullah to reveal that Hiroshi was lost in New Guinea.

Once in New Guinea, the three are attacked by natives and Eko discovers that Lucy was faking her pregnancy. The women learn from Abdullah that two tribes on the island are continuously at war over any perceived dispute. They obtain help from Lung Fei, the son of a deceased missionary, who does not speak any Japanese or Chinese and therefore can only communicate with the women through Abdullah. Lung Fei agrees to help the women and together (without Abdullah) they eventually locate Eko's father Hiroshi, who has been kidnapped by drug smugglers. The women are separated from Lung Fei after being attacked by natives and they must fight off wild animals including a group of Komodo dragons and survive a fall down rushing rapids and over a waterfall.

The women are eventually captured and brought to the smugglers. The leader of the smugglers, Leopard Woman, tortures Lucy until Hiroshi agrees to reveal the location of the treasure he was seeking in exchange for the release of Eko, whom he tells to steal a chopper. Eko is chased by a member of Leopard Woman's gang but Lung Fei saves her. They return to the smugglers and release Hiroshi and Lucy, who escape to a chopper after Lucy is shot in the shoulder. Eko battles and stabs Leopard Woman, but when she reaches the chopper Leopard Woman appears and pulls her out of the chopper as it lifts off. Lung Fei saves Eko and kills Leopard Woman, then throws a whip around a skid of the chopper and carries Lucy as they fly away hanging from the chopper.

The film ends with behind-the-scenes footage of the lead actresses performing their own stunts as the credits roll.

== Cast ==
- Nina Li Chi as Lucy Wong
- Lui Siu-ling as Eko
- Fan Siu-Wong as Lung Fei
- Chang Kuo-chu as Hiroshi Nakamura
- Dick Wei as First Guide
- Shum Wai as Wong
- Devi Sabah as Leopard Woman
- Henry Dantel as Crazy Man
- Advent Bangun as Leopard Woman's Second-In-Command
- Eddy Gombloh as Abdullah
- Anthony Mark Houn as Bleached Hair Tiger
- Wong Ming-Sing as Leopard Woman's Thug
- Henky Dantel

== Production and release ==
The Stone Age Warriors was self-funded by Tong. The film was released on 25 April 1991. It received high praise from some famous film critics, which attracted the attention of Golden Harvest. Tong was then invited to join the company as a film director.

== Reception ==
In his book The Hong Kong Filmography, 1977-1997: A Reference Guide to 1,100 Films Produced by British Hong Kong Studios, author John Charles gives the film a rating of 7/10, writing, "more often than not, the film is excitingly staged, with nearly non-stop, well-edited action and martial arts. The actresses deserve special credit for undergoing the sort of perils that their Hollywood counterparts wouldn't dream of. Stone Age Warriors is definitely recommended to action fans and especially those who are tired of the typical cop and kung fu fare."

Reviewer Andrew Saroch of fareastfilms.com gives the film three out of five stars, writing, "If you’re looking for a strong plot or an all-round classic of cinema, this certainly isn’t for you. However, if you just want an inventive and engaging 90 minute action-comedy, you could do worse than this."

Asian Film Strike gives the film two and a half stars, noting that in the second half "Stone Age Warriors explodes into a big jungle action scene that makes great use of Fan Siu Wong’s remarkable fighting abilities."

Film Blitz gives the film a C+ rating, praising the action but criticizing the comedy, writing, "When in motion, this is excellent entertainment, but Tong exhibits the same leaden feel for comedy he'd bring to Hollywood for Mr. Magoo. Guaranteed to put anyone off being a Hong Kong actress though."

Reviewer Di Kit of cityonfire.com gave the film a rating of 8/10, writing, "This flick is pretty cool and has everything an adventure movie needs like bugs, monsters, natives, cheesy bad guys, and kung fu. After the opening action sequence it takes a while for it to get going, but once it does it doesn't stop until the credits roll. [...] If you're in the mood for action, adventure, kung fu, and half-naked natives then check it out!"

brns.com gives the film a rating of 8.5/10, writing, "It’s a terrific roller coaster ride – full of action and thrills. Elaine Lui gets her share of great fight scenes while Nina Li acts more as a comic foil, but is also knee deep in the fun."
