= Tetsuya Saruwatari =

Japanese manga artist

- Born: June 25, 1958 (age 66); Ōmuta, Fukuoka prefecture, Japan
- Occupation: Manga artist

Tetsuya Saruwatari (猿渡 哲也, Saruwatari Tetsuya, born June 25, 1958) is a mangaka.

He was born in Ōmuta, Fukuoka prefecture, Japan. After dropping out of high school, he worked as assistant of Shinji Hiramatsu and Hiroshi Motomiya. He made the debut as solo manga artist with 海の戦士 (Umi No Senshi) in Weekly Shōnen Jump. Saruwatari's longest running manga is the action comic Tough, which has been serialized in Young Jump for over a decade. Saruwatari also created Riki-Oh, a cult manga sensation featuring graphic martial arts fighting, which was adapted in a Hong Kong live-action film and Japanese OVA. Saruwatari illustrated ZIG, written by Takashi Nagasaki, for Shueisha's Grand Jump in 2017.

== Works ==
- Koukou Tekken-den Tough (25 volumes)
- Riki-Oh (12 volumes)
- The Hard (17 volumes)
- Dog Soldier (12 volumes)
- BAD POLICE (1 volume)
- DAN-GAN (5 volumes)
- Jungle King (1 volume)
- Damned (3 volumes)
- SOUL (4 volumes)
- Tsuukai Abare Bun-ya (1 volume)
- Abare Bun-ya (13 volumes)
- Tough (42 volumes)
  - Tough 2nd (39 Volumes)
  - Oton (2 Volumes)
  - Devils×Devil:Kiryu in Paris (1 Volume)
  - Tough Gaiden:Ryu Wo Tsugu Otoko (continuing)
- Gokusai (4 Volumes)
- Dokuro (4 Volumes)
- Igyoujin Oniwakamaru (4 Volumes)
- Kizudarake no Jinsei (15 Volumes)
- Rūnin (2 volumes)
- Lock Up (4 Volumes)
- Zig (2017, 1 volume)
