= Louis Fan (actor) =

Hong Kong actor and martial artist

- 樊少皇
- Born: Fan Siu-wong; 19 June 1973 (age 53); British Hong Kong
- Occupation: Actor
- Years active: 1985–present
- Spouse: JJ Jia (m. 2016)
- Children: 3
- Father: Fan Mei-sheng

Chinese name
- Chinese: 樊少皇
Transcriptions
Standard Mandarin
- Hanyu Pinyin: Fán Shàohuáng
Yue: Cantonese
- Jyutping: Faan6 Siu6-wong4

Louis Fan Siu-wong (born 19 June 1973) is a Hong Kong actor and martial artist. He is best known worldwide for his starring role as Ricky in Riki-Oh: The Story of Ricky (1991) and as Jin Shanzhao in Ip Man (2008) and Ip Man 2 (2010), as well as roles in numerous television series produced by TVB.

== Biography ==
Fan is the son of Fan Mei-sheng, an actor contracted to the Shaw Brothers Studio. When he was 14, his father sent him to Xuzhou, China, to learn gymnastics and wushu.

After completing his studies, Fan returned to the Hong Kong film industry, and starred in Stanley Tong's Stone Age Warriors (1991). In 1992, at the age of 18, Fan portrayed the titular character in Riki-Oh: The Story of Ricky, a Hong Kong film based on the manga Riki-Oh. He claims that the director and producers of the film met him at the Hong Kong Airport upon arrival and immediately offered him the role. Being a young, up-and-coming actor, he took the role without knowing what it was. He later said he was shocked to discover how bloody and violent the Riki-Oh manga was.

Fan was a contract artiste under the Hong Kong television station TVB throughout the 1990s, and he starred in several television dramas, including Demi-Gods and Semi-Devils (1997) and Young Hero Fang Shiyu (1999). He left TVB in the 2000s, and appeared in several Taiwanese and mainland Chinese television series before focusing on films.

One of his most memorable film performances in the 2000s was as Jin Shanzhao, the tough Northern martial artist in the 2008 martial arts film Ip Man, which starred Donnie Yen as Wing Chun grandmaster Ip Man. Fan's performance in Ip Man earned him a nomination for Best Supporting Actor at the 28th Hong Kong Film Awards in 2009. He reprised his role as Jin Shanzhao in Ip Man 2, the 2010 sequel to Ip Man. He also portrayed a new character in The Legend Is Born – Ip Man (2010), another movie about Yip Man that is unrelated to Ip Man and Ip Man 2.

In 2018, Fan made his proper Hollywood movie debut in the film Attrition (2018) starring alongside Steven Seagal as an ally helping Seagal's character to take down a human trafficking cartel in Thailand.

== Personal life ==
Louis has a daughter, and a son named Alan, from his previous girlfriend; they broke up in 2002. In 2012, he began dating actress and singer JJ Jia. After announcing their engagement, the two were married on 1 January 2016 in a private ceremony in Hong Kong. In November 2017, they had a daughter, nicknamed Little Rice Bowl (小飯兜).

== Filmography ==
- Amsterdam Connection (1978) - Fannie's Little Brother
- Descendant of the Sun (1983)
- The Master Strikes Back (1985) - Tung Hsiao Feng
- Goodbye Mammie (1986)
- Immortal Story (1986) - Li Wen Chi (teenager)
- Righting Wrongs (1986) - Yu Chi-Wen / Sammy
- Silent Love (1986) - Little Dragon
- Dragons of the Orient (1988)
- Stone Age Warriors (1991) - Lung Fei
- Riki-Oh: The Story of Ricky (1991) - Riki-Oh Saiga
- Chu sheng zhi du (1993)
- Once a Cop (1993) - Alan Wong
- Organized Crime and Triad Bureau (1994) - Tak
- Master of Zen (1994) - Son Kwong / Wei Ho
- Fearless Match (1994)
- Portrait of a Serial Rapist (1994) - Policeman
- Water Tank Murder Mystery (1994)
- Chak wong (1995) - Smarty
- Twist (1995, Short)
- Informer (1995)
- The Death Games (1997)
- Unbeatables (2000)
- Huo wu yao yang (2001)
- Spy Gear (2001)
- The Story of Freeman (2001) - Loon
- Legend of Black Mask (2001) - Yung Chi Lieh / Death
- Shadow Mask (2001) - Fu Tien-Ming / Shadow Mask
- Hei se lei tai (2002) - Alex Wong
- Flying Dragon, Leaping Tiger (2002) - Bai Xiao Hu
- Invincible (2003)
- Lethal Cop (2003)
- Hot & Spicy (2003)
- The Boxing King (2003)
- Shaolin vs. Evil Dead (2004) - Hak / Brother Black
- Kung Fu Fighter (2007) - Sam Long
- Wu Seng (2007) - Yang Wu
- Shao Lin jiang shi tian ji (2007) - Dragon Zhao / Steed Zhao
- The Moss (2008) - Beggar
- Connected (2008) - Tong
- Butterfly Lovers (2008)
- Ip Man (2008) - Jin
- Give Love (2009)
- Kung Fu Chefs (2009) - Wong Kai Joe
- On His Majesty's Secret Service (2009) - Lord Unicorn
- Split Second Murders (2009) - Brother Guo
- Just Another Pandora's Box (2010) - Zhang Fei
- Beauty on Duty! (2010) - Donnie Yuen
- Future X-Cops (2010) - Kalong
- Ip Man 2 (2010) - Jin Shan Zhao / Kam Shan-Chau
- The Legend is Born – Ip Man (2010) - Ip Tin-chi / Tanaka Eiketsu
- Flirting Scholar 2 (2010) - Grand Master
- A Chinese Ghost Story (2011) - Ha Suet Fung Lui
- The Flying Swords of Dragon Gate (2011) - Ma Jinliang
- Choy Lee Fut Kung Fu (2011)
- On My Way (2012)
- Palace (2012)
- Wu Dang (2012) - Shui Heyi
- Pay Back (2013)
- The Monkey King (2014) - Juling Shen
- Unbeatable Youth (2014)
- Fight for Glory (2014)
- Kung Fu Jungle (aka Kung Fu Killer) (2014) - Hung Yip
- Bounty Hunters (2016) - Bao Bao
- Return of Wukong (2017)
- The Bravest Escort Group (2018)
- Te zhong shi ming (2018) - Wuyou
- The Big Holy Demon (2018)
- Monster Undersea (2018)
- Monster Undersea 2 (2018)
- Attrition (2018) - Chen Man
- The Great Sage Sun Wukong (2019) - Sun Wukong
- Nocturnal Girl (2019)
- Big Trouble in Dragon Palace (2019)
- Taoist Master (2020)
- Taoist Master: Kylin (2020)

=== Television ===
- Fist of Power (1995) - Wong Kei-ying
- The Hitman Chronicles (1996)
- Justice Sung (1997)
- Weapons of Power (1997)
- Demi-Gods and Semi-Devils (1997) - Hui-juk
- The New Shaolin Temple (1998)
- Young Hero Fong Sai Yuk (1999) - Hong Xiguan
- In the Realm of Fancy (2003)
- Xin Yi Jian Mei (2009)
- Beijing Love Story (2011)
- The Legend of Chu Liuxiang (2012)
- Beauties of the Emperor (2012) - Zi Ren
- The Bride with White Hair (2012)
- The Flying Swords of Dragon Gate (2015)
- Legend of Zu Mountain (2015)
- Heavenly Sword and Dragon Slaying Sabre (2019)

== See also ==
- Hong Kong action cinema
- Cinema of China
