= List of Hong Kong films of 1992 =

This article lists feature-length Hong Kong films released in 1992.

== Box office ==
The highest-grossing Hong Kong films released in 1992, by domestic box office gross revenue, are as follows:

Highest-grossing films released in 1992
| Rank | Title | Domestic gross |
|---|---|---|
| 1 | Justice, My Foot! | HK$50,212,947 |
| 2 | All's Well, Ends Well | HK$48,992,188 |
| 3 | Royal Tramp | HK$40,862,831 |
| 4 | King of Beggars | HK$38,622,449 |
| 5 | Royal Tramp II | HK$36,606,074 |
| 6 | Now You See Love, Now You Don't | HK$36,475,536 |
| 7 | The Magic Touch | HK$36,399,307 |
| 8 | Swordsman II | HK$34,788,794 |
| 9 | Twin Dragons | HK$33,274,116 |
| 10 | Police Story 3: Supercop | HK$32,722,452 |

== Releases ==
| Title | Director | Cast | Genre | Notes |
|---|---|---|---|---|
1992
| All's Well, Ends Well | Clifton Ko | Stephen Chow, Maggie Cheung, Sandra Ng | | |
| Angel Delight | Jiang Yang | | | |
| Angel Terminators | Wai Li | | | |
| Arrest the Restless | Lawrence Lau | Leslie Cheung, Vivian Chow, Charles Heung Wah-keung | | |
| Autumn Moon | Clara Law | Masatoshi Nagase, Li Pui-wai | Comedy-drama | Japanese-Hong Kong co-production |
| Banana Spirit | Lo Kin | | | |
| Basic Impulse | Zha Chuan Yi | | | |
| Battle Field in Hell | Man Wa | | | |
| Beauty Investigator | Lee Tso Nam | | | |
| The Beauty's Evil Roses | Lam Wah Chun | | | |
| Behind the Curtain | Liu Kah Yong | | | |
| Behind the Pink Door | Lam Kam-fung | Pauline Chan, Lam Lee-hong, Alex Fong | | |
| Cageman | Jacob Cheung | Roy Chiao, Liu Kai-chi, Wong Ka Kui, Victor Wong, Teddy Robin | Comedy-drama | |
| Casino Tycoon | Wong Jing | Andy Lau | | |
| Center Stage | Stanley Kwan | Maggie Cheung, Tony Leung Ka-fai, Chin Hang | | |
| Fitness Tour | Liu Guoquan | Lydia Shum, Hou Yiaohua, Gong Hanlin, Jiang Qingging, Dong Liifan | Comedy drama, set near the Three Gorges River | |
| Full Contact | Ringo Lam | Chow Yun-fat, Bridgewater Ann, Anthony Wong | | |
| Game Kids | Gordon Chan | Andy Lau, Aaron Kwok, Rosamund Kwan | | |
| Gangs '92 | Cao Jiannan | Aaron Kwok, Winnie Lau, He Peidong | | |
| Ghost Punting | Sammo Hung, Corey Yuen, Eric Tsang, Ricky Lau | Sammo Hung, Eric Tsang, Natalis Chan, Stanley Fung | | |
| Hard Boiled | John Woo | Chow Yun-fat, Tony Leung Chiu-wai, Teresa Mo | | |
| Justice, My Foot | Johnnie To | Stephen Chow, Anita Mui, Ng Man Tat | | |
| A Kid from Tibet | Yuen Biao | Yuen Biao, Michelle Reis, Nina Li | | |
| Lee Rock III | | | | |
| Moon Warriors | Sammo Hung | Andy Lau, Kenny Bee, Anita Mui | Action | |
| Naked Killer | Clarence Fok Yiu-leung | Chingmy Yau, Simon Yam, Carrie Ng, Madoka Sugawara, Wai Yiu, Hui Siu-Hung, Ken Lo, Esther Wan Yue-Hung | | |
| New Dragon Gate Inn | Raymond Lee | Tony Leung Ka-fai, Brigitte Lin, Maggie Cheung | | |
| The New Marvelous Double | Raymond Si Gaam-Gong | Bryan Leung, Deric Wan, Joey Leung, Lily Lee Lee-Lee, Gloria Yip | Sports comedy | |
| Now You See Love, Now You Don't | Alex Law | Carol Cheng, Chow Yun-fat, Carina Lau | | |
| Once Upon a Time in China II | Tsui Hark | Jet Li, Rosamund Kwan, Max Mok | Martial arts film | |
| Painted Skin | King Hu | Adam Cheng, Joey Wong, Sammo Hung, Lam Ching Ying | | |
| Police Story 3: Super Cop | Stanley Tong | Jackie Chan, Michelle Yeoh, Maggie Cheung | | |
| Queen of Gambler | Lin Guoliang | | | |
| 92 Legendary La Rose Noire | Jeff Lau | Teresa Mo | | |
| Rhythm of Destiny | Andrew Lau | Danny Lee, Aaron Kwok, Sharla Cheung Man | | |
| Royal Tramp | Wong Jing | Stephen Chow, Zhang Min, Ng Man Tat | | |
| Savior of the Soul | | | | |
| The Shootout | | | | |
| Swordsman II | Tsui Hark | Jet Li, Brigitte Lin, Rosamund Kwan | Wuxia | |
| Truant Heroes | Mak Tai-Kit | Leon Lai, Jacky Cheung, Michele Reis | | |
| Twin Dragons | Ringo Lam, Tsui Hark | Jackie Chan, Maggie Cheung, Nina Li Chi, Teddy Robin | Action, comedy | Copyright notice: 1991. |
| The Wicked City | Mak Tai-kit | Jacky Cheung, Roy Cheung, Leon Lai | | |

== See also ==
- 1992 in Hong Kong
