= 12th Hong Kong Film Awards =

1993 Hong Kong Film Awards

- Date: 23 April 1993
- Hosted by: Lydia Shum and John Sham

Highlights
- Best Film: Cageman
- Best Director: Jacob Cheung; Cageman
- Best Actor: Tony Leung Ka-fai; 92 Legendary La Rose Noire
- Best Actress: Maggie Cheung; Center Stage

The 12th Hong Kong Film Awards ceremony, honored the best films of 1992 and took place on 23 April 1993 at Hong Kong Academy for Performing Arts, Wan Chai, Hong Kong. The ceremony was hosted by Lydia Shum and John Sham, during the ceremony awards are presented in 16 categories.

== Awards ==
Winners are listed first, highlighted in boldface, and indicated with a double dagger (‡).

**Best Film**: **Cageman**‡; 92 Legendary La Rose Noire; Center Stage; King of Beggars; Once Upon a Time in China II	**Best Director**: **Jacob Cheung — Cageman**‡; Tsui Hark — Once Upon a Time in China II; Jeffrey Lau — 92 Legendary La Rose Noire; Gordon Chan — King of Beggars; Stanley Kwan — Center Stage
**Best Screenplay**: **Yank Wong, Ng Chong Chau and Jacob Cheung — Cageman**‡; Peggy Chiu — Center Stage; Sandy Shaw — Justice, My Foot!; Jeffrey Lau — 92 Legendary La Rose Noire; Chan Kin Chong — King of Beggars	**Best Actor**: **Tony Leung Ka-fai — 92 Legendary La Rose Noire**‡; Jackie Chan — Police Story 3: Supercop; Charles Heung — Arrest the Restless; Stephen Chow — Justice, My Foot; Tony Leung Ka-fai — King of Chess
**Best Actress**: **Maggie Cheung — Center Stage**‡; Chingmy Yau — Naked Killer; Brigitte Lin — Swordsman II; Brigitte Lin — Handsome Siblings; Maggie Cheung — New Dragon Gate Inn; Anita Mui — Justice, My Foot!	**Best Supporting Actor**: **Liu Kai-chi — Cageman**‡; Francis Ng — Handsome Siblings; Tony Leung Chiu-Wai — Hard Boiled; Anthony Wong — Now You See Love, Now You Don't; Donnie Yen — Once Upon a Time in China II
**Best Supporting Actress**: **Fung Bo Bo — 92 Legendary La Rose Noire**‡; Teresa Mo — 92 Legendary La Rose Noire; Teresa Mo — Now You See Love, Now You Don't; Deanie Ip — Fight Back to School II; Wong Wan Si — 92 Legendary La Rose Noire	**Best New Performer**: **Anita Yuen — The Days of Being Dumb**‡; Koo Ming Wah — Sex Racecourse; Athena Chu — Fight Back to School II; Sammi Cheng — Best of the Best; Hung Yan-yan — Once Upon a Time in China II
**Best Film Editing**: **John Woo, David Wu, Kai Kit-wai** **and Jack Ah — Hard Boiled**‡; Marco Mak — Swordsman II; Marco Mak — Once Upon a Time in China II; Wong Wing Ming — Casino Tycoon; Poon Hung — New Dragon Gate Inn	**Best Cinematography**: **Poon Hang Sang — Center Stage**‡; Lee Tak Sing — Misty; Arthur Wong — Once Upon a Time in China II; Tom Lau and Arthur Wong — New Dragon Gate Inn; David Chung — King of Beggars
**Best Art Direction**: **Pok Yuk Mok — Center Stage**‡; James Leung and Chung Yee Fung — Swordsman II; Eddie Ma — Once Upon a Time in China II; Jason Mok — Royal Tramp 2; Yank Wong and Chin Yiu Hang — Cageman	**Best Costume Make Up Design**: **William Chang and Bruce Yu — Swordsman II**‡; Pok Yuk Mok — Center Stage; Bruce Yu —Justice, My Foot; Yee Chung-Man, Shirley Chan — Royal Tramp 2; Joseph Chan — 92 Legendary La Rose Noire
**Best Action Direction**: **Yuen Wo Ping — Once Upon a Time in China II**‡; Stanley Tong, Tang Tak Wing, Alien Sit, Chan Man Ching and Sam Wong —Police Story 3: Supercop; Tony Ching — Royal Tramp 2; Tony Ching, Yuen Bun — New Dragon Gate Inn; Tony Ching, Yuen Bun, Ma Yuk Sing and Cheung Yiu Sing —Swordsman II	**Best Original Film Score**: **Johnny Chen — Center Stage**‡; Richard Yuen — Swordsman II; Richard Yuen, Johnny Njo — Once Upon a Time in China II; Lowell Lo — 92 Legendary La Rose Noire; Joseph Koo — King of Beggars
**Best Original Film Song**: **Composer: Johnny Chen • Lyrics: Daryl Yao/Johnny Chen** **• Singer: Tracy Huang — Center Stage**‡; Composer/Lyrics: Wong Jim • Singer: Rosanne Lui — Swordsman II; Composer: Lo Ta-yu • Lyrics: Albert Leung • Singer: Lo Ta-yu/Delphine Chin — Mary from Beijing; Composer: Joseph Koo • Lyrics: Wong Jim • Singer: George Lam — King of Beggars	**Special Commemoration Award**: **Ng Chor Fan**‡

Special Commemoration Hong Kong Film Award
- Country: Hong Kong
- Presented by: Hong Kong Film Awards
- First award: 1993

The Special Commemoration Award was a special award presented in memoriam of actor Cho-Fan Ng
