= Swordsman (disambiguation) =

A swordsman is a practitioner of swordsmanship.

Swordsman may also refer to:

- Swordsman (character), a Marvel Comics character
- Swordsman Online, a martial arts MMORPG from Perfect World Entertainment
- The Swordsman (1948 film), a U.S. film
- The Swordsman (1974 film), a British film
- The Swordsman (1990 film), a Hong Kong film
  - Swordsman II, its 1992 sequel
  - The East Is Red, the third movie in the trilogy, also known as Swordsman III
- The Swordsman (1992 film), a Canadian film
- The Swordsman (2020 film), a South Korean film
- Swordsman (TV series), a Chinese TV series
- Laughing in the Wind, a Chinese TV series, known as Swordsman in some regions

== See also ==
- Sword (disambiguation)
