= Jianghu (disambiguation) =

Jianghu is the community of martial artists in wuxia stories and, more recently, outlaw societies like the Triads.

Jianghu or jiang hu or 江湖 (lit. "rivers and lakes") may also refer to:

- Jianghu class frigate, is a family of Chinese ships in the People's Liberation Army Navy
- Meigui Jianghu (lit Rose Martial World), is a 2008 a Chinese drama
- Xiaoao Jianghu (aka The Smiling, Proud Wanderer), is a 1967 wuxia novel by Jin Yong
- Jiang Hu (2004 film), is a 2004 Hong Kong film about Triads, directed by Wong Ching-Po
- Jiang hu: The Triad Zone, is a 2000 Hong Kong film directed by Dante Lam
- Xiao ao jiang hu (1990 film) (aka The Swordsman), is a 1990 wuxia by King Hu
- Liang po po zhong chu jiang hu (lit. Granny Liang Returns to the Triad World), is a 1999 Singaporean film directed by Jack Neo

== See also ==
- Water Margin, arguably the first wuxia novel
