= The Proud Youth =

1978 Hong Kong film by Sun Chung

- Theatrical poster
- 笑傲江湖 / 空谷絕響
- Directed by: Sun Chung
- Screenplay by: Ni Kuang
- Based on: The Smiling, Proud Wanderer by Jin Yong
- Produced by: Runme Shaw
- Starring: Wong Yue; Shih Szu; Michael Chan; Ling Yun
- Cinematography: Lam Ngai Kai
- Edited by: Chiang Hsing-lung; Yu Siu-fung
- Music by: Frankie Chan; Wang Fu-ling
- Production company: Shaw Brothers Studio
- Distributed by: Shaw Brothers Studio
- Release date: 30 March 1978
- Running time: 92 minutes
- Country: Hong Kong
- Language: Mandarin

The Proud Youth (笑傲江湖 / 空谷絕響) is a 1978 Hong Kong wuxia film adapted from the novel The Smiling, Proud Wanderer by Jin Yong. It was produced by the Shaw Brothers Studio, directed by Sun Chung and starred Wong Yue, Shih Szu, Michael Chan and Ling Yun.

== Synopsis ==
Linghu Chong, a swordsman of the Mount Hua Sect, has a serendipitous encounter with Liu Zhengfeng and Qu Yang, who have a close friendship despite being from opposing sides of the jianghu. After passing the score of the musical piece "Xiaoao Jianghu" which they composed together to Linghu Chong, the duo commit suicide. While searching for somebody who truly knows how to appreciate the piece, Linghu Chong meets Ren Yingying, the daughter of the Sun Moon Cult's leader Ren Woxing. However, he ends up being expelled from the Mount Hua Sect and finds himself entangled in the broader conflict between the orthodox sects and the cult, as well as the infighting within the orthodox Five Mountain Sword Sects Alliance.

== Cast ==
- Wong Yue as Linghu Chong (Nangong Song)
- Shih Szu as Ren Yingying (Bai Yingying)
- Stanley Fung as Yue Buqun (Luo Chaojun)
- Michael Chan as Tian Boguang (Hao Jieying)
- Ku Feng as Ren Woxing (Bai Jingtian)
- Wong Chung as Xiang Wentian (Shi Xingxia)
- Lau Wai-ling as Ning Zhongze (Shouyi)
- Chong Lee as Yue Lingshan (Luo Yingzhi)
- Yau Chui-ling as Lan Fenghuang
- Cheng Miu as Zuo Lengshan (Leng Ruojun)
- Yeung Chi-hing as Mo Da (Bing Ji)
- Chan Shen as Tianmen (Zhishan)
- Teresa Ha as Dingwen (Yixin)
- Tin Ching as Dongfang Bubai (Sima Wuji)
- Ling Yun as Liu Zhengfeng (Shi Zhongying)
- Yue Wing as Qu Yang (Gao Yun)
- Wong Ching-ho as Lüzhuweng (Cuilinweng)
- Ng Hong-sang as Lao Denuo
- Chan Wai-ying as Yilin (Huizhi)

== Release ==
When the film was first released in 1978, Taiwan was still under martial law and Jin Yong's wuxia novels were banned by the Kuomintang government. The Proud Youth was among some of the film adaptations which were allowed in Taiwan. However, the film's title and some characters' names had to be changed for the theatrical release in Taiwan.
