= 1992 in Hong Kong =

The following lists events during 1992 in British Hong Kong.

== Incumbents ==
- Monarch of the United Kingdom - Elizabeth II
- Governor - Sir David Wilson (until 3 July), Chris Patten (starting 19 July)
- Chief Secretary - Sir David Ford

== Events ==
- United States-Hong Kong Policy Act is formulated.

== Births ==
- 6 August - Tara Moore, tennis player

== See also ==
- List of Hong Kong films of 1992
