= The Three Swordsmen =

1994 Hong Kong film by Taylor Wong

- Film poster
- 刀劍笑
- Directed by: Taylor Wong
- Screenplay by: Sze Mei-yee; Lee Sai-hung
- Story by: Chris Lau
- Produced by: Liu Kin-fat
- Starring: Andy Lau; Brigitte Lin; Elvis Tsui
- Cinematography: Chow Kei-seung; Chow Kim-ming
- Edited by: Ma Chung-yiu; Chu San-kit
- Music by: Alan Kwok
- Production companies: Wing Fat Film Production; Hang Chi Production
- Release date: 25 August 1994
- Running time: 86 minutes
- Country: Hong Kong
- Language: Cantonese
- Box office: HK$3,545,666

The Three Swordsmen (刀劍笑) is a 1994 Hong Kong wuxia film directed by Taylor Wong, starring Andy Lau, Brigitte Lin and Elvis Tsui. It was shot in Tianjin and the Zhuozhou World Studios.

== Synopsis ==
The story follows three swordsmen – Xiaosanshao, Mingjian, and Hengdao – who are equally matched for the position of the top fighter in the jianghu. Seven years ago, Mingjian has defeated Yan Dunhuang, an evil martial artist from the Western Regions and imprisoned him. Hengdao has left the jianghu to serve as an imperial guard commander, leaving Xiaosanshao and Mingjian to compete for the top position in the next contest.

During the event, Xiaosanshao is accused of breaking into the palace, stealing two treasures, and murdering an imperial concubine. Xiaosanshao evades arrest and sets out to clear his name, getting romantically involved with Diewu, Yan Dunhuang's second daughter who is enamoured with him. He also encounters his ex-lover Hongye, who reveals that Yan has escaped from captivity and forced her to frame Xiaosanshao for the crimes.

Meanwhile, the authorities sends Hengdao and Helian Chunshu to arrest Xiaosanshao, who protests his innocence and escapes before taking shelter in Mingjian's residence. Eventually, it is revealed that Caiyi, Diewu's sister, is the mastermind behind the crimes that Xiaosanshao is accused of. Caiyi kills her father Yan Dunhuang and captures Diewu. Caiyi explains that she has done all that to help Mingjian retain the position of top fighter in the jianghu before killing herself with Mingjian's sword.

The next day, Mingjian and Xiaosanshao are scheduled for a duel to decide who will be the top fighter, and the winner will find out where Diewu has been hidden. Mingjian ultimately concedes the position to Xiaosanshao, who rejects it and leaves with Diewu.

== Cast ==
- Andy Lau as Xiaosanshao
- Brigitte Lin as Mingjian
- Elvis Tsui as Hengdao
- Yu Li as Caiyi
- Lisa Tung as Diewu
- Cao Ying as Madam Hongye
- Jin Demao as Helian Chunshu
- Zhao Jian as Yan Dunhuang
- Siqin Gaowa as Mingjian's mother
- Leung Sze-ho as the Crown Prince

== Box office ==
The film grossed HK$3,545,666 at the Hong Kong box office during its theatrical run from 25 August to 2 September 1994.

== See also ==
- Andy Lau filmography
