= Justice, My Foot! =

1992 Hong Kong film by Johnnie To

- Theatrical release poster
- Directed by: Johnnie To
- Written by: Sandy Shaw
- Produced by: Clifton Ko
- Starring: Stephen Chow; Anita Mui; Ng Man Tat; Carrie Ng; Wong Yat-Fei; Bryan Leung
- Cinematography: Peter Pau
- Edited by: Chu Sun-Kit; Ng Kam-Wah
- Music by: William Wu
- Production company: Cosmopolitan Film Productions
- Release date: 2 July 1992
- Running time: 102 minutes
- Country: Hong Kong
- Language: Cantonese
- Box office: $50,212,947

Justice, My Foot! (Chinese: 審死官) is a 1992 Hong Kong comedy film directed by Johnnie To, starring Stephen Chow, Anita Mui and Ng Man Tat.

The film is set in the Qing dynasty and the protagonist is a litigation master, but his work is portrayed more similarly to a Hong Kong lawyer. The movie is based on the book Four Scholars.

== Synopsis ==
Sung is by far the best lawyer in Guangdong and the outlying areas of Southeast China. His skills have earned his family an excellent living, albeit his habit of winning all his cases by whatever means necessary. Because of his shyster ways, none of his sons survived beyond a year old, causing grief for his wife Madam Sung. Upon the death of his 13th son, Sung decides to retire from law and switch to business, opening an inn in the middle of town and a tea stand on the outskirts of the city.

Sung finds it difficult to truly give up his former career, and in his boredom reenacts his final case constantly. A chance encounter between Madam Sung and a woman whose husband was suspiciously murdered revives his hopes of returning to court. However, the case is compounded by corrupt magistrates, who make it their goal to bury the truth. Sung needs all his wits to beat a system that he has embraced for a long time, as well as redeem himself so he can finally start a family.

== Cast ==
- Stephen Chow - Sung Sai Kit
- Anita Mui - Madam Sung
- Ng Man-tat
- Carrie Ng
- Wong Yat Fei - Fu / Ah Fuk
- Bryan Leung
- Eddy Ko
- Paul Chun
- Kingdom Yuen
- Mimi Chu

== Awards and nominations ==
Awards and nominations
Ceremony	Category	Recipient	Outcome
Asia-Pacific Film Festival	Best Actor	Stephen Chow	Won
29th Golden Horse Awards	Best Feature Film	Justice, My Foot!	Nominated
29th Golden Horse Awards	Best Actor	Stephen Chow	Nominated
29th Golden Horse Awards	Best Adapted Screenplay	Sandy Shaw	Nominated
29th Golden Horse Awards	Best Film Editing	Sun-Kit Chu	Nominated
29th Golden Horse Awards	Best Original Film Score	William Hu	Nominated
12th Hong Kong Film Awards	Best Screenplay	Sandy Shaw	Nominated
12th Hong Kong Film Awards	Best Actor	Stephen Chow	Nominated
12th Hong Kong Film Awards	Best Actress	Anita Mui	Nominated
12th Hong Kong Film Awards	Best Costume Make Up Design	Bruce Yu	Nominated

== See also ==
- List of Hong Kong films
