= Hard Boiled =

1992 film directed by John Woo

- Theatrical release poster

Chinese name
- Chinese: 辣手神探
- Literal meaning: Hard Boiled Detective
Transcriptions
Standard Mandarin
- Hanyu Pinyin: Làshǒu Shéntàn
Yue: Cantonese
- Yale Romanization: Laaht-sáu Sàhntaam
- Jyutping: Laat^{6}sau^{2} San^{4}taam^{3}
- IPA: [lat̚˨.sɐw˧˥ sɐn˩tʰam˧]
- Directed by: John Woo
- Screenplay by: Gordon Chan; Barry Wong
- Story by: John Woo
- Produced by: Linda Kuk; Terence Chang
- Starring: Chow Yun-fat; Tony Leung; Teresa Mo; Philip Chan; Philip Kwok; Anthony Wong
- Cinematography: Wang Wing-heng
- Edited by: John Woo; David Wu; Kai Kit-wai; Jack Ah
- Music by: Michael Gibbs
- Production companies: Golden Princess Film Production; Milestone Pictures
- Distributed by: Golden Princess Film Production
- Release date: 16 April 1992
- Running time: 128 minutes
- Country: Hong Kong
- Language: Cantonese
- Budget: US$4.5 million
- Box office: HK$19.7 million (HK); US$71,858 (US); 85,104 tickets (France)

Hard Boiled (Chinese: 辣手神探; lit. 'Hard Boiled Detective') is a 1992 Hong Kong action film directed by John Woo from a screenplay by Gordon Chan and Barry Wong, based on a story by Woo. The film stars Chow Yun-fat as Inspector "Tequila" Yuen, alongside Tony Leung Chiu-wai and Teresa Mo. It follows a hard-boiled police inspector whose pursuit of a violent Triad syndicate draws him into a dangerous operation involving an undercover officer working deep within the criminal organization.

The film was Woo's final Hong Kong film before his transition to Hollywood. Conceived in response to criticism that his earlier works romanticized criminals, Woo aimed to create a police-centered action film inspired by the Dirty Harry series. Production was marked by extensive improvisation and ongoing script revisions, particularly following the death of co-writer Barry Wong. Several characters and narrative elements were introduced or reworked during filming, while earlier story concepts—including a subplot involving a child-targeting criminal—were abandoned.

Hard Boiled was released theatrically in Hong Kong in 1992 to strong audience response. Although it did not match the domestic box-office success of Woo's A Better Tomorrow (1986), it outperformed The Killer (1989) in the local market. Internationally, the film received widespread critical acclaim, with particular praise for its elaborate gunfight choreography, long takes, and kinetic visual style.

Over time, Hard Boiled has come to be regarded as a landmark of Hong Kong action cinema and one of the defining works of the heroic bloodshed genre. Its action sequences—especially the extended hospital shootout—are frequently cited by critics and filmmakers as among the most accomplished in the history of the genre. The film has since achieved cult status and has been recognized as a major influence on action cinema worldwide. In 2007, a sequel in the form of a video game, Stranglehold, was released, with Chow Yun-fat reprising his role and Woo serving as creative director.

== Plot ==
In a Hong Kong teahouse, Royal Hong Kong Police inspectors "Tequila" Yuen and Benny Lung surveil a group of gun smugglers while they are making a deal. When a rival gang ambushes the deal, a fierce shootout breaks out; the gangsters are defeated, but several police officers and civilians are wounded and Benny is killed. As revenge, Tequila executes the gangster who killed Benny rather than arrest him. He is reprimanded by Chief Superintendent Pang, who needed the executed gangster as a key witness. After a police funeral, Pang burns the personnel file of another smuggler Tequila killed, revealing him to be an undercover cop.

Meanwhile, Alan, an assassin working for Triad boss "Uncle" Hoi, murders one of Hoi's subordinates who had double-crossed them for a rival syndicate led by upstart Johnny Wong. Wong, who is looking to usurp the old Triad bosses through his control of the illicit arms trade, is impressed by Alan's skill and attempts to recruit him. Alan reluctantly accepts the offer, and Wong brings Alan to a raid on Hoi's warehouse as an initiation, where many of Hoi's men are killed. Surrounded, Hoi lets Alan kill him to spare his surrendering men, but Alan kills them all anyway to please Wong. Tequila, who has been watching from cover, ambushes and defeats Wong's men, but is caught by Alan, who spares him. Tequila confronts Pang, demanding to know if Alan is an undercover cop. Pang refuses to say, but reveals the teahouse friendly fire killing to Tequila and warns him to stay away from the case.

Tequila tracks Alan to his sailboat and deduces he is undercover, but they are ambushed by the remnants of Hoi's gang. The pair fight off the attackers and Tequila flees just before Wong arrives, allowing Alan to keep his cover. Wong realizes that one of his lieutenants, Foxy, is a police informant. Wong's henchman, Mad Dog, beats Foxy before Alan is ordered to execute him with a shot to the chest, but before that he manages to place cigar lighter in Foxy's chest pocket that saves his life. Foxy finds Tequila at a jazz bar and informs him that Wong's armory is hidden in a vault beneath the Maple hospital. As Tequila takes Foxy to the hospital, Wong discovers that Foxy is alive and sends Alan to kill him, while also discreetly sending Mad Dog to monitor Alan. At the hospital, Alan confronts Tequila, demanding to know the whereabouts of the vault; while the two are distracted, Mad Dog kills Foxy.

Alan and Tequila discover Wong's vault, where they briefly skirmish with Mad Dog. As Pang, officer Teresa Chang, and other inspectors evacuate the hospital, Wong and his men attempt to gain leverage by taking the staff and patients hostage while indiscriminately shooting fleeing patients and responding police officers, irritating Mad Dog with his callousness. Alan and Tequila team up to rescue the hostages and battle Wong's men; meanwhile, Pang evacuates the lobby and takes command at the police perimeter, while Chang and the Special Duties Unit rescue trapped babies from the maternity wing. As they fight their way through the hospital, Alan accidentally shoots a plainclothes officer and is overcome with guilt; Tequila consoles him by sharing his similar experience from the teahouse and encourages him to fight on.

The pair eventually confront Mad Dog again. While Tequila leaves to assist Chang and rescue one last baby, Alan and Mad Dog engage in a tense duel before ending in a standoff with a group of crippled patients between them. They allow the patients safe passage to leave, but Wong arrives and guns down the patients while trying to kill Alan, who escapes. Enraged, Mad Dog tries to kill Wong, but is gunned down by Wong when his pistol runs out of ammunition. Alan and Tequila kill the remaining gangsters and confront Wong, but he detonates bombs in the armory, setting the hospital ablaze and forcing Tequila to flee with the baby while Alan goes after Wong. As the hospital explodes, Wong drags Alan outside at gunpoint and forces Tequila to humiliate himself. Using this as a distraction, Alan wrestles for Wong's pistol and ends up shooting himself in the gut, surprising Wong enough for Tequila to fatally shoot Wong in the head, before collapsing.

Alan is revealed to have survived the ordeal. To protect Alan from the Triads, Pang and Tequila destroy Alan's personnel file and declare him dead, allowing him to leave Hong Kong to start a new life.

== Cast ==
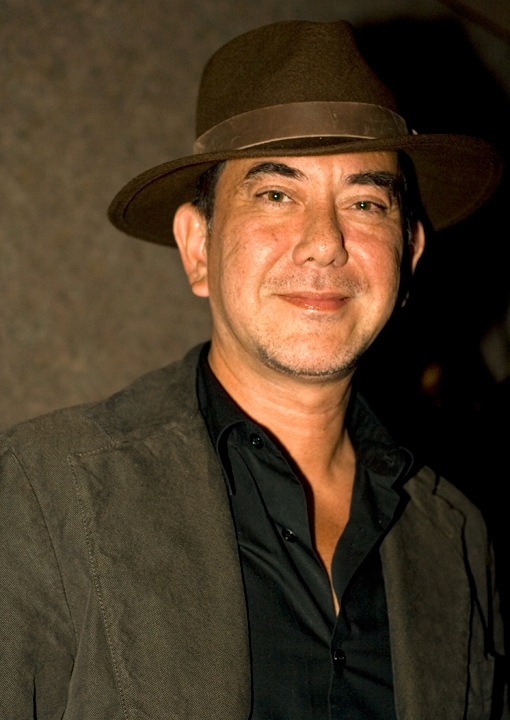
Anthony Wong, who portrayed triad boss Johnny Wong

- Chow Yun-fat as Inspector "Tequila" Yuen Ho-yan (Chinese: 袁浩雲; Jyutping: Jyun^{4} Hou^{6}wan^{4}): A clarinet-playing, alcoholic police sergeant with a reputation for defying his superiors and bending police rules. Chow had previously worked with director John Woo on several of his films, including A Better Tomorrow, The Killer and Once a Thief.
- Tony Leung Chiu-wai as Alan (江浪; Gong^{1}long^{6}): An undercover cop posing as a high-ranking triad assassin. He makes an origami crane every time he kills someone, a trait which was influenced by Woo's daughter when he saw her making them. Alan is shown as living alone on a yacht and considers himself to be asocial. Woo stated that this was influenced by Alain Delon's character in the French crime film Le Samouraï. Leung had previously worked with Woo on his film Bullet in the Head.
- Teresa Mo as Teresa Chang (程思琳; Cing^{4} Si^{1}lam^{4}): A fellow police officer who is the girlfriend of Tequila. She helps to decode the secret code songs that are sent to the police by Alan written on cards attached to bouquets that he has delivered to her.
- Philip Chan as Supt. Pang (彭; Paang^{4}): Tequila's superior. Prior to the film, Chan was a police officer for about fifteen years. He felt that certain scenes in the film were very familiar as they were similar to real police work.
- Philip Kwok as "Mad Dog" (獨眼龍; Duk^{6}ngaan^{5}lung^{4}; 'Cyclops'): A skilled gunfighter and gang enforcer working for Johnny Wong. Kwok was also the film's stunt coordinator.
- Anthony Wong as Johnny Wong: A scheming triad boss who plans to seize complete control of Hong Kong's gangs using the earnings from his gun smuggling business, most of which are stored in the basement of a hospital.
- Bowie Lam as Benny Lung (龍; Lung^{4}): Tequila's long-time partner and fellow jazz musician. He dies in the opening shootout after accidentally killing a civilian.
- Bobby Au-yeung as "Lionheart": An officer who works under Tequila's supervision.
- Kwan Hoi-san as "Uncle" Hoi (海叔; Hoi^{2} Suk^{1}): Alan's boss, an aging gangster who turns down an opportunity to leave Hong Kong as he considers it to be irresponsible. Alan is forced to kill him after Johnny takes control of his gun warehouse.
- Stephen Tung as Little Ko "Foxy" (阿高; Aa^{3} Gou^{1}): Johnny's lieutenant who secretly informs on his gang to Tequila. After he is exposed as a traitor, Alan intervenes to save his life. Foxy is later killed by Mad Dog at the hospital in which the final shoot-out takes place.
- John Woo as Woo, the Bartender: A former cop who runs the jazz bar where Tequila performs and offers him advice.
- Jun Kunimura as the Tea-House Gunman: A gun smuggler who kills Benny at the teahouse and is subsequently gunned down by a vengeful Tequila.
- Michael Dinga as "Little Mustache": Wong's Malaysian associate, whom Alan assassinates in a library.
- Lau Kong as the hospital director.
- Anjo Leung as Benny's son.

== Production ==
=== Development ===
The film was originally developed in 1990. After creating films which focused on the lives of gangsters, director John Woo wanted to make a film that glorified the police instead. Woo admired Clint Eastwood's and Steve McQueen's characters from their films Dirty Harry and Bullitt respectively, and wanted to make his own Hong Kong-style Dirty Harry police detective film. While creating this character, Woo was inspired by a police officer who was a strong-willed and tough member of the police force, as well as being an avid drummer. This led to Woo having Tequila's character be a musician as well as a cop.

Before production started, Woo told his actors that he was not going to make the film as stylish as his previous films, but to have it be more of an "edgy thriller". The role of Teresa Chang was originally made for actress Michelle Yeoh, who had a long relationship with producer Terence Chang. After casting Teresa Mo, the character of Teresa Chang was greatly re-written. The film's initial story was about Tony Leung's character being a psychopath who would poison baby food. When Terence Chang was making connections to have Woo make films in the United States, he found people uninterested and disgusted with the theme of babies being poisoned. This halted production for a month to develop a new story. Screenwriter Barry Wong was brought in to write a new story about Tony Leung's character being an undercover police officer. After writing the first part of the script, Wong went on a vacation in Germany, where he died, leaving the script unfinished.

=== Filming ===
Hard Boiled took 123 days to shoot in 1991. Although Woo told his cast that the film would be more gritty and not as stylish as his previous films, Hard Boiled became more stylish as the filming began. The tea house sequence in the film was shot before the script was written. The crew found that the teahouse was going to be torn down and decided to film a scene there. Woo saw the staircase in the teahouse, and thought about a scene where a character would come shooting down gun smugglers while sliding down the banister. The teahouse sequence was shot in around a week's time and was choreographed by Woo and Philip Kwok. It was shot with interruptions from local triads in the area asking for protection money, and residents complaining about the noise.

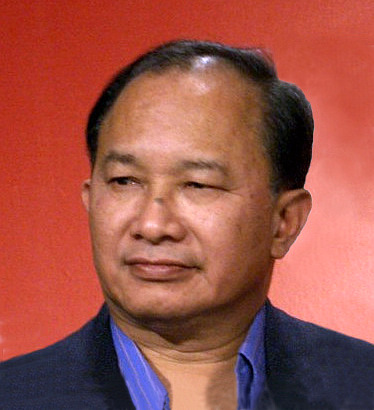
Director John Woo acted in Hard Boiled as a bartender who would give Chow Yun-fat's character advice. Woo's character was developed after filming had already started.

The script of the film went through several changes during filming. Due to the length of the film, scenes from a side-story involving the relationship between the characters Tequila and Teresa Chang were cut. Another cut scene included Tequila playing clarinet over Benny's grave. With these cuts, Chow Yun-fat felt his character was not very deep in comparison to Leung's character of Alan. To develop his character more, Chow asked John Woo to insert a mentor character in the film, which Woo himself would play; Chow felt that having Woo in this role would make Woo not cut out these scenes. Philip Kwok's role of Mad Dog was not in the script and was created on the set. Kwok first worked with Woo on his film Once a Thief and was asked to return to work on Hard Boiled. After reading the script, Woo felt that the character of Johnny Wong was not a strong enough physical threat. After seeing Kwok do several of the stunts while filming, Woo created the character of Mad Dog for him.

The scenes in the hospital maternity ward and the warehouse were shot at a studio called "The Coca-Cola Factory", named for its former use as a Coca-Cola bottling plant. The hospital scenes took 40 days to shoot. The hospital segment's location was chosen since they wanted to have an atypical location where gangs would hide their weapons. While filming in the hospital, the windows were covered with blast shields to give the appearance of night time, which allowed the crew to film at any time during the day. The cast and crew stayed in the hospital for days, often losing track of time. After long hours of filming in the hospital, the crew became exhausted. This prompted the direction of one of the climax's action scenes, a lengthy shootout through the hospital's halls, to be a five-minute long take, so as to shorten the time needed to film. To complete this, during a brief 20-second scene in the middle of the take inside an elevator, the crew quickly changed the set props and rigged the explosions and practical effects in time for the next scene to continue. While filming the hospital sequence, Tony Leung was injured when glass fragments went into his eyes, and he was hospitalized before returning after a week-long rest. Woo changed the ending of Hard Boiled after many members of the crew of the film felt that Leung's character should survive at the film's end.

=== Post-production ===
Woo is a fan of jazz music and wanted a jazz-style soundtrack for Hard Boiled. Woo had also previously wanted a singer to perform a jazz song and have Chow Yun-fat's character play saxophone in his previous film The Killer. The producer for The Killer, Tsui Hark, rejected this idea for The Killer, feeling that Hong Kong audiences did not enjoy and understand jazz music. The score heard in Hard Boiled was created by jazz musician Michael Gibbs. During promotional screenings, the score for the film was different and was described as "very haunting music", but this score ultimately could not be used as the production crew could not acquire the rights to the music. Other songs featured in the film, include "Hello" by Lionel Richie and the traditional song "Mona Lisa". Woo chose these songs specifically for their lyrics to suggest that Tony was a sort of pen pal to Teresa. All the characters in Hard Boiled had their voices dubbed by their own actors to save money. Woo stated this was convenient as he did not have to worry about setting up boom mics and other sound elements.

== Release ==
=== Theatrical run ===
Hard Boiled was released on 16 April 1992 in Hong Kong. The film grossed HK$19,711,048 which was not as strong of a box office reception as Woo's A Better Tomorrow but was slightly better than the domestic gross of The Killer. On the film's initial release in Hong Kong it debuted at number 3 in the box office where it was beaten by Tsui Hark's Once Upon a Time in China 2 and the Stephen Chow film Fight Back to School II.

The North American premiere of Hard Boiled was in September 1992 at the Toronto International Film Festival. At the premiere, the audience response was very positive with people stomping their feet and yelling at the screen. This reception surprised producer Terence Chang who did not expect such a positive reaction. It had a limited US release in June 1993, grossing US$71,858. In France, it was released the same month and sold 85,104 tickets. Hard Boiled received a wide release in the United Kingdom on 8 October 1993.

=== Home media ===
A laserdisc edition of Hard Boiled was released by The Criterion Collection in December 1995. A region free DVD of Hard Boiled was released by The Criterion Collection on 10 July 1998. A second Region 1 DVD of the film was released by Fox Lorber. Fox Lorber released the film as a stand-alone release and as a double feature with The Killer on 3 October 2000. The most recent Region 1 release of Hard Boiled was from Dragon Dynasty, who released a two disc DVD of the film on 24 July 2007. The collector's edition of the PlayStation 3 version of the video game Stranglehold, which served as a sequel to Hard Boiled, includes a remastered version of the film on the game disc, but it can only be played on a PlayStation 3 system.

For decades after going out of print on home media, the film was unavailable in Western territories due to rights issues with the film catalog of co-producer Golden Princess. Woo said in 2023 that the film, along with The Killer, could not be re-released without the approval of the rights holders. In early 2025, Shout! Studios acquired the worldwide rights (excluding select Asian countries) to the 156-film Golden Princess film catalog, with intentions to make the films available via both physical media and streaming platforms. A 4K UHD edition of Hard Boiled was then released on 4 November 2025, quickly selling out.

== Reception ==
Initial reception to Hard Boiled was positive. Vincent Canby of The New York Times found it difficult to follow both the action scenes and the subtitles at the same time, but stated that "Mr. Woo does, in fact, seem to be a very brisk, talented director with a gift for the flashy effect and the bizarre confrontation." A review in the Los Angeles Times stated that "With Hard Boiled, John Woo shows himself to be the best director of contemporary action films anywhere." The Philadelphia Inquirer spoke positively about the action scenes, noting the "epic shootouts that bookend Hard-Boiled, John Woo's blood-soaked Hong Kong gangster extravaganza, are wondrously staged, brilliantly photographed tableaux." The Boston Herald proclaimed the film as "arguably Woo's masterpiece, it is an action film to end all action films, an experience so deliriously cinematic it makes True Romance, a film that clearly aspires to it, look like a cheap copy" A review in Newsday gave the film three and a half stars, stating that "Mayhem has never looked better than in John Woo's latest high-caliber cops-and-robbers thriller, even if the plot is a bit slippery" and that John Woo "has blasted the action genre onto a whole new level. His shootouts are a ballet; his firebombings are poetry. And while he lets the body count get away from him, he constantly fascinates, through a combination of chaos and an excruciating control over what we're allowed to see."

"I found out Western audiences love it more than The Killer. The critics liked The Killer more because it mixed the action with the art. But movie lovers liked Hard Boiled."
—John Woo on the reception of Hard Boiled

Public perception of the film has only improved over time; the review-aggregation website Rotten Tomatoes gives it a score of 92%, with an average rating of 7.8 out of 10, based on 71 reviews. The website's "Critic's Consensus" for the film reads, "Boasting impactful action as well as surprising emotional resonance, Hard Boiled is a powerful thriller that hits hard in more ways than one." Film scholar Andy Klein wrote that the film is "almost a distillation of [Woo's] post-1986 work. Even if the plot is full of holes, and the emotional tug isn't quite as strong as in The Killer, the action sequences (nearly the whole movie) are among the greatest ever filmed". Mark Salisbury of Empire Magazine gave the film four stars out of five, calling it "Infinitely more exciting than a dozen Die Hards, action cinema doesn't come any better than this." Salisbury compared Hard Boiled to Woo's American films, stating that his Hong Kong films are "not as slick as his later films, [Hard Boiled is] more inventive and stylised and [has] great early performances from Fat and Leung". Empire placed the film at number 70 in their list of "The 100 Best Films Of World Cinema" in 2010. In 2023, Stephanie Zacharek of Time put Hard Boiled on a list of the "100 Best Movies of the Past 10 Decades", stating that Woo's "artistry lies in the way he shapes a sequence for maximum kinetic effect, creating mosaics of sound and action that leave you feeling exhilarated rather than beaten up." Ed Gonzalez of Slant Magazine gave the film the highest rating of four stars, proclaiming it to be one of Woo's best films. The British film magazine Empire ranked the character of Tequila as 33rd in their "The 100 Greatest Movie Characters" poll.

== Accolades ==
At the 12th Hong Kong Film Awards, David Wu and John Woo won the award for "Best Film Editing". Tony Leung was nominated for "Best Supporting Male Actor", but he refused the nomination on the grounds that he had a leading role in the film. His protest was supported by John Woo and Chow Yun-fat. This later led the Hong Kong Film Awards to change its nomination rules to allow for multiple leading roles from the same film.

Award ceremony	Date of ceremony	Category	Nominee(s)	Result	Ref.
Hong Kong Film Awards	23 April 1993	Best Supporting Actor	Tony Leung Chiu-wai	Nominated	
Hong Kong Film Awards	23 April 1993	Best Film Editing	John Woo, David Wu, Kai Kit-wai, and Jack Ah	Won	

== Video game ==
In 2007, Midway Games released the game Stranglehold. The game's story and storyboards were made in collaboration with John Woo. The game features the character Tequila from Hard Boiled, who is travelling the globe in search of his kidnapped daughter. In 2009 John Woo's production company Lion Rock Entertainment was reported to be developing a film version of the game, to be written by Jeremy Passmore and Andre Fabrizio. Following the box-office disappointment of Woo's film The Crossing, Woo and Chang disbanded Lion Rock Productions.

== See also ==
- Chow Yun-fat filmography
- Hong Kong action cinema
- Hong Kong films of 1992
- List of action films of the 1990s
- List of cult films
