= The Last Conflict =

1988 Hong Kong film by Raymond Lee

- Film poster
- Genre: Crime thriller Action
- Screenplay by: Lai Man Cheuk
- Directed by: Raymond Lee
- Starring: Donnie Yen; Adia Chan; Francis Ng; Stephen Chow; Lau Kong; Andy Tai
- Theme music composer: Wong Ka Sin
- Country of origin: Hong Kong
- Original language: Cantonese
- No. of episodes: 1

Production
- Producer: Thomas Tang
- Cinematography: Ng Ka Kam; Chung Kwok Keung; Ng Sui Ying; Cheung Kwok Hei
- Editor: Cho Ho Tong
- Running time: 115 minutes
- Production company: TVB International

Original release
- Network: TVB Jade
- Release: 1988

The Last Conflict
- Traditional Chinese: 刑警本色
- Simplified Chinese: 刑警本色
- Literal meaning: "True Colors of a Cop"
Transcriptions
Standard Mandarin
- Hanyu Pinyin: Xíng Jǐng Běn Sè
Yue: Cantonese
- Jyutping: Jing4 Ging2 Bun2 Sik1

The Last Conflict is a 1988 Hong Kong action crime thriller television film produced by TVB directed by Raymond Lee and starring Donnie Yen, Adia Chan, Francis Ng, Stephen Chow, Lau Kong and Andy Tai.

== Plot ==
Interpol officer Dickson Kwan is sent to Hong Kong to investigate in a fake passport forgery case and collaborates with officer Pau Sei and Lau Ting Kin. Due to different approaches on investigating, Dickson and Sei often get into conflicts. Later during an arrest operation, Dickson saves Sei's life and they forget about their bygones. Sei has a daughter Eva, who opposes his father being a cop. Dickson falls in love with Eva and pursues her, however she does not like Dickson's dangerous profession and although she has feelings for him, she still rejects him. On the day just after his retirement Sei is killed in an ambush by Tong who mistaken him for Dickson since he picked up the message Tong left for Dickson. Even without proof, Dickson knows the murderer of Sei is Tong and he relentlessly goes after him despite being ordered to leave Hong Kong. Finally Tong is shot dead by Lau Ting Kin at the construction site where he lured Dickson using Eva. Dickson finally leaves Hong Kong and the others go on with their lives in Hong Kong as usual.

== Cast ==
- Donnie Yen as Dickson Kwan
- Stephen Chow as Lau Ting Kin
- Lau Kong as Sergeant Pau Sei
- Adia Chan as Eva Pau
- Francis Ng as Tong Hak
- Andy Tai as Pow
- Cheng Yim Fung
- Angela Yu Chien as Kin's mother
- Sin Po Wah
- Cheng Ka Sang as Man who takes hostage
- Wong Chi Wai as thug
- Liu Chun Hung as Lun
- Lo Tin Wai
- Stephen Yip as Ricky
- Wong Sze Yan
- Ng Sui Ting
- Raymond Tsang
- Chui Po Lun
- Luk Chung Kit
- Poon Man Pak
- Wayne Lai
- Lily Liu
- Wong Fung King
- Lam Yin Ming
- Ben Wong as Pork Shing
- Kong Ning
- Choi Ling
- Ling Hon
- Mak Ho Wai as Priest taken hostage
- Wong Hung Kam
- Sin Kim To
- To Siu Chun
- Evergreen Mak
- Shek Yan Wan
- Chu Kong
- Pau Wai Leung as receptionist
- Tang Tai Wo
- Lam Chi Tai
- Mak Wai Cheung
- Chung Wing
- Fong Yue
- Wong Ka Leung
- Lam Foo wai
- Fan Chin Hung
