= State of Divinity (1996 TV series) =

1996 Hong Kong TV series

- Poster
- Also known as: The Smiling, Proud Wanderer
- 笑傲江湖
- Genre: Wuxia
- Based on: The Smiling, Proud Wanderer by Jin Yong
- Screenplay by: Wong Kwok-fai; Chiu Ching-yung; Ng Kim-wah; Leung Yan-tung; Tong Kin-ping; Wong May-seung
- Directed by: Lau Kwok-ho; Kwong Kam-wang; Ho Shu-pui; Chan Seung-kuen; Koon Kwok-wai; Yuen Ying-ming
- Starring: Jacky Lui; Fiona Leung; Timmy Ho; Cherie Chan
- Opening theme: "Live an Unrestrained Life" (活得瀟灑) by Alan Tam and Priscilla Chan
- Composer: Choi Kok-kuen
- Country of origin: Hong Kong
- Original language: Cantonese
- No. of episodes: 40 (Hong Kong version); 43 (international version)

Production
- Executive producer: Lee Tim-shing
- Production location: Hong Kong
- Running time: ≈40 minutes per episode
- Production company: TVB

Original release
- Network: TVB
- Release: 24 June – 16 August 1996

State of Divinity (笑傲江湖) is a Hong Kong wuxia television series adapted from the novel The Smiling, Proud Wanderer by Jin Yong. Starring Jackie Lui, Fiona Leung, Timmy Ho and Cherie Chan, the series was first broadcast on TVB in Hong Kong in 1996.

== Cast ==
- Jackie Lui as Linghu Chong
- Fiona Leung as Ren Yingying
- Timmy Ho as Lin Pingzhi
- Cherie Chan as Yue Lingshan
- He Meitian as Yilin
- Wong Wai as Yue Buqun
- Lily Li as Ning Zhongze
- Pau Fong as Feng Qingyang
- Law Lok-lam as Ren Woxing
- Henry Lo as Dongfang Bubai
- Lau Kong as Xiang Wentian
- Sue Tam as Lan Fenghuang
- Kwan Ching as Yu Canghai
- Chan Hung-lit as Zuo Lengchan
- Tam Yat-ching as Tianmen
- Suen Kwai-hing as Mo Da
- Cheng Lui as Mu Gaofeng
- Cheung Ying-choi as Fangzheng
- Tam Chuen-hing as Chongxu
- Wah Chung-nam as Bujie
- Alice Fung as Mute Granny
- Cheng Bak-lun as Tian Boguang
- Chan Chi-hung as Wang Yuanba
- Law Lan as Dingyi
- Leung Bo-ching as Dingjing
- Leung Shun-yin as Dingxian
- Cheng Siu-ping as Yihe
- Wan Seung-yin as Yiqing
- Leung Suet-may as Yiyu
- Wayne Lai as Liu Zhengfeng
- Newton Lai as Qu Yang
- Law Kwok-wai as Lüzhuweng
- Chan Tik-hak as Tong Baixiong
- Leila Tong as Qu Feiyan
- Chan Chung-kin as Huangzhonggong
- Leung Yam-kei as Heibaizi
- Lee Lung-kei as Tubiweng
- Kwong Chor-fai as Danqingsheng
- Chan Wing-chun as Lao Denuo
- Tang Yu-chiu as Liang Fa
- Lee Ka-keung as Lu Dayou
- Kong Ming-fai as Ying Bailuo
- Cho Kai as Feng Buping
- Sit Chun-kei as Cheng Buyou
- Chu Tit-wo as Lin Zhennan
- Wong Hoi-sam as Lin Zhennan's wife
- Leung Siu-tik as Ding Mian
- Fong Kit as Lu Bai
- Cheung Hon-ban as Fei Bin
- Lee Hoi-sang as Zhong Zhen
- Wong Fai as Bu Chen
- Chan Siu-wah as Sha Tianjiang
- Mak Tsi-wan as Di Xiu
- Lau Siu-kwan as Yu Renyan
- Chan Min-leung as Jia Renkui
- Wong Wai-tak as Hou Renying
- Kwok Chuk-wah as Hong Renxiong
- Mak Ka-lun as Yu Renhao
- Wong Kai-tak as Luo Renjie
- Cheung Hung-cheung as Tin-chung
- Leung Ming-wah as Tiansong
- Lui Kim-kwong as Yujizi
- Koi Ngok as Yuqingzi
- Shek Wan as Yuyinzi
- Ho Pik-kin as Fangsheng
- Shum Hang-sang as Chenggao
- Ling Chi-hung as Qingxu
- Choi Nei as Lin Yuantu
- Wong Sun as Yue Buqun's master
- Shum Sing-ming as Cai Zifeng
- Wong Dai-wai as Yue Su
- Shum Wai as Ping Yizhi
- Ho Ho-yuen as Huang Boliu
- Liu Lai-lai as Lady Zhang
- Cheuk Fan as Qiu Songnian
- Ling Hon as Zhou Gutong
- Yu Miu-Lin as Wu Boying
- Wong Tin-chak as You Xun
- Tang Yu-wing as Sima Da
- Cheng Ka-sang as Zu Qianqiu
- Choi Kwok-hing as Laotouzi
- Agnes Lam as Laobusi
- Wong Sing-sheung as Heixiong
- Lo Wai as Baixiong
- Koo Ming-wah as Ji Wushi
- Lee Yiu-ging as Yang Lianting
- Lee Wai-man as Shangguan Yun
- Lee Tze-kei as Jia Bu
- Hui Bo-hin as Xiang Danian
- Yoe Biu as Mi Weiyi
- Ruco Chan as Liu Zhengfeng's elder son
- Wu Yiu-fung as Liu Zhengfeng's younger son
- Law Kwan-tso as Wang Bofen
- Wong Chun-ning as Wang Zhongqiang
- Kwok Tak-shun, Kiu Hung, Yu Tin-wai and Bok Gwan as the Four Immortals of the Peach Valley
