= Fire Dragon =

1994 Hong Kong film by Yuen Woo-ping

- DVD cover
- 火雲傳奇
- Directed by: Yuen Woo-ping
- Written by: Ng Man-fai
- Produced by: Thomas Ng
- Starring: Brigitte Lin; Max Mok; Sandra Ng; Elise Yeh; Pal Sinn; Wu Gang
- Cinematography: Jingle Ma
- Edited by: Angie Lam; Andy Chan
- Music by: Lowell Lo
- Distributed by: Regal Films
- Release date: 26 May 1994
- Running time: 91 minutes
- Country: Hong Kong
- Language: Cantonese
- Box office: HK$1,160,795

Fire Dragon (火雲傳奇) is a 1994 Hong Kong wuxia film directed by Yuen Woo-ping, starring Brigitte Lin as the eponymous protagonist.

== Plot ==
Yingxia, nicknamed "Fire Dragon", is an assassin serving under the Sixth Prince, who has sent her on a mission to retrieve and destroy a letter containing evidence of the prince's treason. The letter falls into the hands of Xuanming, a wandering swordsman. Both Xuanming and Yingxia go undercover in a travelling acrobatic troupe led by Lianru while trying to draw each other.

As Yingxia gets more involved with people who welcome her into their homes, she gradually changes from being a cold-hearted killer to a generous, warm-hearted person. When the Sixth Prince learns of Yingxia's betrayal, he sends her friend Yingxue to kill her. After Yingxia kills Yingxue in a duel, she is determined to give up her past ways. With help from a few chivalrous friends, she stands up to and eventually defeats the Sixth Prince.

== Cast ==
- Brigitte Lin as "Fire Dragon" Yingxia
- Max Mok as Xuanming
- Wu Gang as Zhen
- Pal Sinn as the Sixth Prince
- Sandra Ng as Lianru
- Elsie Yeh as Yingxue

== Reception ==
Andrew Saroch of fareastfilms.com gave the film a rating of 4 out of 5 stars, writing, "Taking a popular narrative and adding a unique sense of charm to it, Yuen Woo-ping creates a strangely captivating atmosphere with a familiar cast. Brigitte Lin is superb as the beautiful assassin who finds herself in a conflict between her head and her heart. It's very refreshing to see her move away from the traditional ice-queen and portray someone with a slowly unravelled vulnerable side. Although very dependent on wires, Yuen Woo-ping's stellar choreography is of his usual high standard and there is still a few moments of genuine physicality that will have fans looking for the rewind button. Overall then, 'Fire Dragon' offers a very pleasing evening’s entertainment that is unlikely to disappoint."

Cherycok of darksidereviews.com gave the film a rating of 5.5 out of 10.
