= New Dragon Gate Inn =

1992 Hong Kong film by Raymond Lee

- Film poster
- 新龍門客棧
- Directed by: Raymond Lee
- Written by: Tsui Hark; Charcoal Tan; Hiu Wing
- Produced by: Tsui Hark
- Starring: Maggie Cheung; Brigitte Lin; Tony Leung; Donnie Yen
- Cinematography: Arthur Wong; Tom Lau
- Edited by: Poon Hung
- Music by: Philip Chan; Chow Gam-wing
- Production companies: Film Workshop; Seasonal Film Corporation
- Distributed by: Golden Harvest
- Release date: 27 August 1992
- Running time: 103 minutes
- Country: Hong Kong
- Language: Cantonese

New Dragon Gate Inn (新龍門客棧), also known as Dragon Inn in North America, is a 1992 Hong Kong wuxia film directed by Raymond Lee and produced by Tsui Hark, starring Maggie Cheung, Brigitte Lin, Tony Leung, and Donnie Yen. A remake of Dragon Gate Inn (1967), New Dragon Gate Inn was shot as a standard wuxia action thriller, with fast-paced action including martial arts, swordfighting and black comedy set in 15th-century China.

Both New Dragon Gate Inn and the original Dragon Gate Inn centre on the familiar wuxia motif of a corrupt Ming‑dynasty eunuch in power and a band of martial heroes striving to rescue the descendants of a loyal official. What distinguishes New Dragon Gate Inn is its incorporation of the innkeeper archetype Jin Xiangyu (金鑲玉), adapted from the proprietress Wan Jen-mi (萬人迷) in the 1973 wuxia film The Fate of Lee Khan. The remake weaves this character into the narrative and expands the story with a web of turbulent‑era passions, rivalries, and entanglements.

The film received a total of nine nominations across the 29th Golden Horse Awards and the 12th Hong Kong Film Awards, ultimately winning the prize for Best Action Choreography.

== Synopsis ==
The film is set in 15th-century China during the Ming dynasty. Cao Shaoqin, the powerful eunuch who controls the spy agency Eastern Depot, has gotten rid of his political rival Yang Yuxuan, the war minister. Yang's daughter, Yuying, has been sent into exile in a remote desert region in northwest China. Cao intends to use Yuying as bait to lure her father's loyal followers into a trap and eliminate all of them. Zhou Huai'an, one of Yang's former subordinates, has asked his lover, the swordswoman Qiu Moyan, to help him save Yuying and meet him at Dragon Gate Inn. Unknown to them, Cao has sent three of his best fighters to kill them.

Jin Xiangyu, the inn's owner, has been luring unsuspecting guests to stay in the inn to rob and kill them under the guise of running a legitimate business. She has a crush on Zhou, who already loves Qiu. When Zhou is cornered by Cao's men at the inn, he pretends to agree to marry Jin to trick her into revealing the location of a secret tunnel that would allow them to escape the inn, after which he would leave with Qiu on the night of the supposed wedding.

Just then, Cao shows up at the inn with his forces. Zhou, Qiu and Jin have no choice but to put aside their differences for the time being and work together to defeat and kill Cao in order to save Yuying. Qiu dies of her wounds during the battle, while Jin burns down the inn and accompanies Zhou as he rides into the distance.

== Cast ==
- Maggie Cheung as Jin Xiangyu
- Brigitte Lin as Qiu Moyan
- Tony Leung as Zhou Huai'an
- Donnie Yen as Cao Shaoqin
- Lau Shun as Jia Ting
- Yuen Cheung-yan as Tiezhu
- Hung Yan-yan as Cao Tian
- Yen Shi-kwan as He Hu
- Lawrence Ng as Lu Xiaochuan
- Wang Tongchuan as Diao Buyu
- Yuen Bun as Xiaoheizi
- Elvis Tsui as the Yanmen Pass general
- Chan Chi-fai as Yimohong
- Yumiko Cheng as Yang Yuying

== Themes ==
New Dragon Gate Inn was one of the films in which Brigitte Lin portrayed a woman in disguise as a man, in addition to Peking Opera Blues, Swordsman II, Royal Tramp II, Handsome Siblings, and Ashes of Time.

== DVD releases ==
On 17 July 2000, the film was released on DVD by Hong Kong Legends in Europe in Region 2.

Four and a half years later, the Fantasy Swordplay Collection DVD was released on 14 February 2005 in a three-disc set. The set included two other films: The Swordsman and Moon Warriors.

One year later, The Donnie Yen Collection DVD was released on 29 May 2006 in a four-disc set. The set included two other films: Once Upon a Time in China II, and a two-disc platinum edition of Iron Monkey.

== See also ==
- Donnie Yen filmography
- List of Hong Kong films
