= The Other Side of Gentleman =

1984 Hong Kong film by Ringo Lam

- Film poster

Chinese name
- Chinese: 君子好逑
Transcriptions
Standard Mandarin
- Hanyu Pinyin: Jūnzǐ hǎo qiú
Yue: Cantonese
- Jyutping: gwan1 zi2 hou3 kau4
- Directed by: Ringo Lam
- Written by: Cheung Lai-Ling; Barry Wong
- Produced by: Barry Wong
- Starring: Alan Tam; Brigitte Lin
- Cinematography: Hong-Hung Chan; Cheung Chi-Keuung; Raymond Lam; Yu Tsin
- Edited by: Choi Hung
- Music by: Chan Fei-Lit
- Production company: Always Good Film Company
- Distributed by: Golden Princess Amusement Company
- Release date: 28 June 1984
- Running time: 93 minutes
- Country: Hong Kong
- Language: Cantonese
- Box office: HK$11,787,487

The Other Side of Gentleman (君子好逑) or The Other Side of a Gentleman is a 1984 Hong Kong romantic comedy film directed by Ringo Lam, and starring Alan Tam and Brigitte Lin.

== Plot ==
A community committee, with funding from their wealthy patron Uncle Chiu, seeks to cure the lack of motivation that they view to be the ill of modern youth. They select playboy biker Alan Ng as the subject of an experiment to see if the love of an upstanding woman can motivate a man to be a more respectable member of society. Stuck without any other viable options deemed to be upstanding enough, they choose committee member Jo Jo to be the woman in the experiment.

Jo Jo is already engaged to a professor and dreads the assignment, but finds herself increasingly attracted to Alan as he reforms himself for her. When she wants to back out of the experiment, her fiancé tells Alan that the relationship was just an experiment, which leaves Alan heartbroken. Nevertheless, he crashes Jo Jo's wedding and tells her he can't live without her. After the wedding he attempts to crash his motorcycle into the couple's car but causes a massive accident that sends Jo Jo to the hospital. The committee tries to convince Alan that Jo Jo is dead, but Jo Jo runs out of the hospital as Alan is leaving and jumps on his motorcycle to ride away with him.

== Cast ==
- Alan Tam as Alan Ng
- Brigitte Lin as Jo Jo
- Chan Chi-Fai
- Chuen Chan
- Kitty Chan as Girl in Disco
- Chan Yau-Hau
- Chang Kuo-chu as Professor Cheung
- Cheng Siu Ping
- Rico Chu
- Fung Ging-man as Alan's Father
- Ho Wing-Hin
- Lam Ying-Fat
- Yan Lee
- Leung Bo-Jing
- Leung Chi-Ming as Waiter
- Jamie Luk as Tough Guy in Parking Garage
- Pak Wan-Kam
- Tsang Chor-Lam as Mahjong Player
- Tsui Kwok-Keung
- Tung Wei as Oxy
- Wait Gei Shun
- Barry Wong as Father Tam
- Wong Kam-Bo
- Wong Kwan-Yee
- Stephan Yip

== Reception ==
Reviewer Andrew Saroch of fareastfilms.com gave the film 2 out of 5 stars, writing, "With all characters underwritten it seems churlish to criticise performances, but eighties Asian singing sensation Tam is a charisma vacuum and not even the legendary Lin can convince in her thankless damp squib of a role. Hard to imagine Quentin Tarantino borrowing from this one."

The website brns.com gave the film a rating of 5.0/10, writing, "The film begins as a light fluffy comedy that portends an enjoyable little farce, but as it progresses it slowly becomes more serious and leaves its charms behind at the roadside. As is often Lam's inclination, he delves into the subject of obsession, but while he later had actors such as Lau Ching-wan and Chow Yun Fat to explore this with, here he is stuck with Alan Tam. An Alan Tam obsessed reminded me of a petulant Mouskateer looking for his misplaced ears. I kept hoping Annette Funicello would show up and tell him to get a grip and put him over her knee. Whenever Brigitte is in a scene with him she towers over him charismatically like the Colossus of Rhodes over a mouse. Alan Tam is simply not Brigitte worthy."

The website onderhond.com gave the film 2 out of 5 stars, writing, "An old Ringo Lam comedy. Clearly a training film for Lam. You won't recognize much of his typical style, there are no real crime elements and the grittiness is almost completely absent. It's a typical 80s Hong Kong comedy, not great but passable and somewhat entertaining. Hard to recommend, unless you're a completist."

The website AllMovie gives the film a rating of 2.5 out of 5 stars.

== "Root of Love" ==
"Root of Love" single

The film's theme song "愛的根源" ("Root of Love"), sung by Alan Tam, was nominated for a Hong Kong Film Award for Best Original Film Song at the 4th Hong Kong Film Awards and became commercially successful.
