= The Smiling, Proud Wanderer =

1967–1969 wuxia novel by Jin Yong

- Cover of the 1980 edition
- Author: Jin Yong
- Original title: 笑傲江湖
- Language: Chinese
- Genre: Wuxia
- Publisher: Ming Pao
- Publication date: 1967
- Publication place: Hong Kong
- Media type: Print
- ISBN: 9789573262121
- Preceded by: The Heaven Sword and Dragon Saber
- Followed by: The Sword Stained with Royal Blood

The Smiling, Proud Wanderer
- Chinese: 笑傲江湖
- Literal meaning: Laughing Proudly in the Jianghu
Transcriptions
Standard Mandarin
- Hanyu Pinyin: Xiào Ào Jiāng Hú
Yue: Cantonese
- Jyutping: Siu^{3} Ngou^{6} Gong^{1} Wu^{4}

The Smiling, Proud Wanderer (笑傲江湖), literally "to live a carefree life in the jianghu", also known as The Wandering Swordsman, Laughing in the Wind, The Peerless Gallant Errant, The Proud and Gallant Wanderer, and State of Divinity, is a wuxia novel by Jin Yong (Louis Cha). It was first serialised in Shin Min Daily News in Singapore from 18 March 1967, followed by Ming Pao in Hong Kong from 20 April 1967 to 12 October 1969. The novel, partly written while Jin Yong was taking refuge in Singapore following the 1967 Hong Kong riots, is noted for its political allegory, particularly its allusions to the Cultural Revolution.

== Plot ==
In the jianghu, there is a highly-coveted martial arts manual called the Bixie Swordplay Manual which is the heirloom of the Lin family, who runs a private security company in Fuzhou. The Qingcheng Sect attacks and massacres the Lins in an attempt to obtain the manual, but it is nowhere to be found. Yue Buqun, the leader of the Mount Hua Sect — a member of the "orthodox" Five Mountains Sword Sects Alliance — saves Lin Pingzhi (the sole survivor), takes him as an apprentice, and trains him in swordsmanship.

The novel's protagonist is Yue Buqun's first apprentice, Linghu Chong, a happy-go-lucky but honourable swordsman with a penchant for alcoholic drinks. He rescues Yilin, a nun from the (North) Mount Heng Sect, from abduction and assault by the notorious bandit Tian Boguang. As a result, the friendless Tian Boguang befriends Chong. In the meantime, Liu Zhengfeng of the (South) Mount Heng Sect announces his decision to leave the jianghu and invites his fellow martial artists to witness his retirement ceremony. The event turns into a bloodbath when Zuo Lengchan of the Mount Song Sect and other "orthodox" sects accuse Liu Zhengfeng of being unfaithful to their alliance by befriending Qu Yang, an elder of the "unorthodox" Sun Moon Holy Cult. Chong sees that Liu Zhengfeng and Qu Yang are in fact close friends and musical partners, but the two are cornered by Zuo Lengchan and his men and commit suicide. Before dying, Liu Zhengfeng and Qu Yang give Linghu Chong the score of "Xiaoao Jianghu" ("Laughing Proudly in the Jianghu"), a musical piece they composed together. (The Chinese title of the novel comes from the name of this fictional musical piece.)

Yue Lingshan, Yue Buqun's daughter, falls in love with the new entrant Lin Pingzhi, and Linghu Chong's romantic feelings for her diminish. At the same time, Linghu Chong's friendship with Tian Boguang brings trouble as it violates Mount Hua rules to associate with members of unorthodox sects. Yue Buqun punishes him by making him stay alone for a year on the uninhabited top of Mount Hua. During this time, he discovers carvings of sword techniques in a cave, practises them, and unknowingly learns the swordsmanship of the other four sects as well as the counter-moves. Tian Boguang arrives at the cave to force Chong to join him under threat of death. Tian has superior skill and easily overwhelms and injures Chong, but the battle extends over several days as Chong secretly learns more and more and techniques from the carvings each night. Tian becomes suspicious but Chong cleverly manipulates him so that he never investigates the rest of the cave. The reclusive Mount Hua swordsman Feng Qingyang, who inscribed the carvings, arrives and coaches Chong directly. Chong defeats Tian Boguang, and Feng teaches him a powerful set of skills called the Nine Swords of Dugu.

The self-proclaimed "orthodox" Five Mountains Sword Sects Alliance, though seemingly united, is constantly troubled by politicking and infighting among its members. Linghu Chong gets entangled in the conflicts and sustains serious internal injuries while using his newly mastered skill to defend his Mount Hua fellows from attacks by Mount Song members in disguise. He intuitively uses the quick but unforceful strikes of Dugu's "missile-breaking stance" (or projectile-countering technique) to slash the eyes of, rather than outright fight, a group of assassins who surround and outnumber him. The other sects mistake the Nine Swords of Dugu for the Bixie Swordplay, and accuse Linghu Chong of stealing the manual and keeping it for himself. Yue Buqun also becomes suspicious and secretly jealous of his apprentice's sudden and dramatic improvement in swordsmanship.

While accompanying his master and fellows on a trip to Luoyang, Linghu Chong encounters Ren Yingying, a key figure of the Sun Moon Holy Cult. He also meets several jianghu lowlifes, who are friendly towards him and try to heal him. By then, Yue Buqun has grown tired of Linghu Chong's association with jianghu lowlifes, so he abandons Linghu Chong and expels him from the Mount Hua Sect. Linghu Chong helps Ren Yingying fend off enemies of the cult, and his injuries worsen over time. Eventually, Ren Yingying takes him to the Shaolin Sect, where he learns the Yijin Jing and heals himself.

Linghu Chong sinks into despair as he is now an outcast of the "orthodox" side of the jianghu. After leaving Shaolin, he meets Xiang Wentian who is drinking calmly in a pub while surrounded by a massive group of hundreds of hesitant attackers. Chong instantly admires him and drinks with him, and the two fight alongside each other and escape. They travel together and become sworn brothers. Xiang Wentian takes him to a manor in Hangzhou, where a small tight-knit group of 3 men obsessed with painting, calligraphy, go, and sword art challenge Chong to combat. They are delighted and amazed when he defeats them. On a friendly tour of the premises, Chong is shown a secluded dungeon where Ren Woxing (Ren Yingying's father), the former leader of the Sun Moon Holy Cult who had been ousted from power by his deputy, Dongfang Bubai, is held in captivity. Ren Woxing breaks out by knocking out Linghu Chong and placing him in the cell as a decoy. The dungeon is so secluded, and security so precautious, that he has no way to communicate or convince anyone of his identity. He is chained up in pitch darkness for weeks, and panics in an emotional breakdown, but discovers carvings of Ren Woxing's infamous Cosmic Absorbing Power and learns the skill. Ren Woxing returns to retrieve Linghu Chong and tries to persuade him to join the cult by offering him Ren Yingying's hand in marriage. Linghu Chong declines, but helps Ren Woxing defeat Dongfang Bubai and regain control of the cult.

Linghu Chong becomes the new head of the (North) Mount Heng Sect after he unsuccessfully tries to save its leaders from a masked assassin. He attends a special assembly of the alliance called for by Zuo Lengchan, who attempts to coerce the other sects to submit to his command. During a contest to decide who will lead the alliance, Yue Buqun unexpectedly uses the Bixie Swordplay against Zuo Lengchan, defeating and blinding him. Yue Buqun then becomes the alliance chief.

After leaving the assembly, Linghu Chong and Ren Yingying see Lin Pingzhi brutally killing Qingcheng Sect members to avenge his family, and overhear a conversation between him and Yue Lingshan, who is now his wife. Lin Pingzhi reveals that both he and Yue Buqun have mastered the Bixie Swordplay, which is considered "unorthodox" because they need to castrate themselves to learn it. Linghu Chong also learns that Yue Buqun, his respectable former master, is actually a villainous hypocrite who plotted an elaborate scheme against Lin Pingzhi to seize the manual and master the Bixie Swordplay to become the most powerful figure in the jianghu. Lin Pingzhi then stabs Yue Lingshan to prove his loyalty to Zuo Lengchan, who is plotting revenge against Yue Buqun. Before Yue Lingshan dies, she makes Linghu Chong promise to spare Lin Pingzhi's life as she still loves him.

Yue Buqun seeks to silence Lin Pingzhi, who knows his secret. Linghu Chong, despite his reluctance to turn against his former master, ultimately chooses to stop Yue Buqun and protect the innocent from his evil machinations. The finale climaxes with the alliance members being lured and trapped in a cave on Mount Hua. They start slaughtering each other out of paranoia and distrust, leading to the alliance's dissolution. Linghu Chong defeats Lin Pingzhi and spares his life, but permanently cripples him to prevent him from hurting others again. Meanwhile, Yue Buqun is inadvertently killed by Yilin while fighting with Linghu Chong during the frenzy.

After the alliance's collapse, Ren Woxing plans an attack on the fragmented "orthodox" sects to unite the jianghu under his control. He tries to force Linghu Chong to join him, but dies at a crucial moment from a stroke. Ren Yingying becomes the new leader of the Sun Moon Holy Cult and successfully negotiates a truce between the "orthodox" and "unorthodox" sides of the jianghu. Three years later, she passes the leadership to Xiang Wentian, marries Linghu Chong, and retires to lead a reclusive life with him.

== Sects, clans and organisations ==
=== Five Mountain Sword Sects Alliance ===
The Five Mountain Sword Sects Alliance (五嶽劍派) is formed by five "orthodox" martial arts sects specialising in swordsmanship, each based on one of the Five Great Mountains: Mount Hua, (South) Mount Heng, (North) Mount Heng, Mount Song, and Mount Tai. Originally established to counter the Sun Moon Holy Cult, the alliance ultimately disintegrates due to mutual distrust, betrayal and infighting.

- Mount Hua Sect (華山派): Split into the Sword and Qi factions, which respectively focus more on swordsmanship and qigong. The Qi faction won the power struggle and forced the Sword faction into exile. It is led by Yue Buqun.
- (South) Mount Heng Sect (衡山派): Led by Mo Da, a mysterious swordsman known for playing melancholic music on a huqin, where his sword is concealed.
- (North) Mount Heng Sect (恆山派): Led by a trio of Buddhist nuns, its members are all women and mostly Buddhist nuns. Linghu Chong eventually becomes its leader and starts taking in male members as well.
- Mount Song Sect (嵩山派): Led by Zuo Lengchan, who resorts to various unscrupulous means (e.g. bribery, blackmail, murder, subterfuge) in his bid to force the other four sects to submit to him and merge under his control.
- Mount Tai Sect (泰山派): Led by Tianmen, its members are mostly Taoists.

=== Sun Moon Holy Cult ===
The Sun Moon Holy Cult (日月神教) is a martial arts sect of unknown origin, based on Black Woods Cliff (黑木崖; in present-day Xibaipo, Hebei). In the jianghu, it is often referred to as the "Demonic Cult" (魔教) as it is considered eccentric and heretical, and hence a common enemy of the "orthodox" side of the jianghu. Its members are known for engaging in various types of cult-like activities and committing heinous crimes. It was led by Ren Woxing until Dongfang Bubai ousts the former from power in a scheme. Dongfang treats his followers cruelly, forcing them to consume poison pills and giving them antidotes to temporarily ease their agony only if they obey him. Ren Woxing practises the "Cosmic Absorbing Power" (吸星大法), which allows him to drain and absorb an opponent's neigong, while Dongfang Bubai is said to be invincible after he mastered the skills in the Sunflower Manual (葵花寶典).

=== Others ===
- Qingcheng Sect (青城派)
- Fuwei Security Service (福威鏢局)
- Shaolin Sect (少林派)
- Wudang Sect (武當派)

== Themes ==
In the afterword, Jin Yong mentions that The Smiling, Proud Wanderer can be read as a political allegory disguised as a wuxia novel. As an allegory, it can happen in "any dynasty or organisation". Jin Yong also stated in the afterword that after the novel was published, Vietnamese politicians had once used the names of Yue Buqun and Zuo Lengchan as derogatory terms against one another in parliamentary sessions.

== Adaptations ==
=== Films ===
Year	Production	Main cast	Additional information
1978	Shaw Brothers Studio (Hong Kong)	Wong Yue, Shih Szu, Michael Chan, Ling Yun	See The Proud Youth
1990	Film Workshop (Hong Kong)	Sam Hui, Sharla Cheung, Cecilia Yip, Jacky Cheung, Fennie Yuen, Lau Siu-ming	See The Swordsman
1992	Film Workshop (Hong Kong)	Jet Li, Rosamund Kwan, Michelle Reis, Brigitte Lin, Fennie Yuen	See Swordsman II
1993	Film Workshop (Hong Kong)	Brigitte Lin, Joey Wong, Yu Rongguang	See The East Is Red (1993 film)
2025	StudioMars	Kitty Zhang, Tim Huang, Yume Ma, Holis Jiang, Sammo Hung	See Invincible Swordsman

=== Television ===
Year	Production	Main cast	Additional information
1984	TVB (Hong Kong)	Chow Yun-fat, Rebecca Chan, Jaime Chik, Kenneth Tsang, Tung Wai, Isabella Wong	See The Smiling, Proud Wanderer (1984 TV series)
1985	TTV (Taiwan)	Bryan Leung, Leanne Liu	
1996	TVB (Hong Kong)	Jacky Lui, Fiona Leung, Cherie Chan, Timmy Ho, He Meitian, Wong Wai	See State of Divinity (1996 TV series)
2000	CTV (Taiwan)	Richie Ren, Anita Yuen, Vivian Chen, Song Ta-ming, Yue Yueli, Tsai Tsan-te, Leanne Liu	See State of Divinity (2000 TV series)
2000	MediaCorp (Singapore)	Steve Ma, Fann Wong, Ivy Lee, Chew Chor Meng, Jacelyn Tay, Zheng Geping, Priscelia Chan	See The Legendary Swordsman
2001	Ciwen Film & TV Production Co. Ltd. (Mainland China)	Li Yapeng, Xu Qing, Wei Zi, Miao Yiyi, Li Jie, Cheng Lifeng, Yu Chenghui	See Laughing in the Wind
2013	Cathay Media (Mainland China)	Wallace Huo, Yuan Shanshan, Yang Rong, Chen Xiao, Howie Huang, Joe Chen, Deng Sha, Han Dong, Lü Jiarong, Bryan Leung	See Swordsman (TV series)
2018	Youku (Mainland China)	Ding Guansen, Xue Haojing, Ding Yuxi, Chen Xun, Jiang Xinxin, Ding Yuxi, Liu Jiatong and Jiang Zhuojun	See New Smiling, Proud Wanderer (2018 TV series)

=== Comics ===
A total of 26 volumes of the manhua series by Lee Chi Ching, titled State of Divinity, were published by Ming Ho in Hong Kong and M&C (Gramedia Group) in Indonesia.

=== Stage productions ===
In 2006, the Hong Kong Dance Company adapted the novel into a stage play, starring Rosanne Wong, Race Wong, Liu Yinghong, Su Shu, Chen Lei and Mi Tao, as a jubilee presentation to celebrate the company's 25th anniversary.

In 2010, the Yangtze Repertory Theatre of America presented the premiere of Laughing in the Wind: A Cautionary Tale in Martial Arts in New York City. The play was adapted and directed by Joanna Chan and featured 18 actors playing 26 roles.

=== Video games ===
- From 2000 to 2002, Interserv International Inc. published three games adapted from the novel using a 3D engine.
- Swordsman Online is a MMORPG developed by Perfect World. The game also features additional schools that do not appear in the novel.
- Linghu Chong was a playable character in the 2008 PC fighting game Street Fighter Online: Mouse Generation.
