= Handsome Siblings =

1992 Hong Kong film by Eric Tsang

- DVD cover art
- 絕代雙驕
- Directed by: Eric Tsang
- Screenplay by: Stanley Wu; Cheuk Hon
- Based on: Juedai Shuangjiao by Gu Long
- Produced by: Stephen Shiu
- Starring: Andy Lau; Brigitte Lin; Deanie Ip; Ng Man-tat
- Cinematography: Jingle Ma; Ray Wong; Peter Ngor; Joe Chan; Ardy Lam; Poon Hang-sang
- Edited by: Kwong Chi-leung; Kam Ma
- Music by: Lowell Lo; Sherman Chow
- Production company: Win's Entertainment
- Distributed by: Newport Entertainment
- Release date: 12 November 1992
- Running time: 102 minutes
- Country: Hong Kong
- Language: Cantonese
- Box office: HK$19,649,030

Handsome Siblings (絕代雙驕) is a 1992 Hong Kong wuxia film adapted from the novel Juedai Shuangjiao by Gu Long. The film was directed by Eric Tsang and stars Andy Lau and Brigitte Lin.

== Synopsis ==
The Twin Demons, who are part of the Ten Villains, cause mass civilian deaths by robbing disaster relief funds. Yaoyue, the leader of the wulin, attempts to eliminate the Ten Villains but is stopped by her husband Yan Nantian, who believes the other Villains are innocent. A fight breaks out between the couple, resulting in Yan Nantian becoming paralysed while Yaoyue leaves. Their son Xiaoyuer is saved and raised mainly by two of the Villains, while Yaoyue later adopts a girl Hua Wuque, whom she raises as a boy and trains to succeed her as the next leader of the wulin.

18 years later, Xiaoyuer, accompanied by his foster parents, participates in a martial arts contest to win a pair of highly-coveted tokens that allow the owner to judge anyone in the wulin. By chance, he meets Hua Wuque and they fall in love with each other. As the contest progresses, Xiaoyuer, Hua Wuque, Jiang Yulang, and Jiang Yulang's father Jiang Biehe make it to the final stage.

At this point, it is revealed that Jiang Biehe and Monk Beihai are actually the Twin Demons in disguise. Yaoyue is poisoned, exposed as Xiaoyuer's mother, and killed. Jiang Yulang murders his father and becomes the new leader of the wulin, but betrays the community later. Xiaoyuer and Hua Wuque marry, heal Yan Nantian, and team up to defeat Jiang Yulang, bringing an end to the conflict in the wulin.

== Cast ==
- Andy Lau as Xiaoyuer
- Brigitte Lin as Hua Wuque
- Sharla Cheung as Yaoyue
- Ng Man-tat as Li Dazui
- Deanie Ip as Tu Jiaojiao
- Francis Ng as Jiang Yulang
- Fung Hark-On as Monk Beihai
- Michael Miu as Yan Nantian
- Anita Yuen as Tie Xinlan
- Chang Kuo-chu as Jiang Biehe
- Richard Ng and Wong Ching as the Supreme Judges
- Josephine Koo as Black Widow
- Shing Fui-On as Gao Zhishen
- Peter Chan as Tie Zhan

== Music ==
The theme song "Cynicism" (玩世不恭) was composed by Lowell Lo with the lyrics by Susan Tong, and sung by Andy Lau. Another song from the film, "The Eve of the Final Battle" (決戰前夕), was composed by Joseph Koo with the lyrics by Susan Tong, and also sung by Andy Lau.

== Accolades ==
Accolades
| Ceremony | Category | Recipient | Outcome |
|---|---|---|---|
| 12th Hong Kong Film Awards | Best Actress | Brigitte Lin | Nominated |
| 12th Hong Kong Film Awards | Best Supporting Actor | Francis Ng | Nominated |
