= Dongfang Bubai =

Fictional character in The Smiling, Proud Wanderer by Jin Yong

- The Smiling, Proud Wanderer character
- Created by: Jin Yong

In-universe information
- Gender: Male
- Affiliation: Sun Moon Holy Cult
- Fighting style: Sunflower Manual style
- Weapon: Needles
- Significant other: Yang Lianting

Dongfang Bubai
- Traditional Chinese: 東方不敗
- Simplified Chinese: 东方不败
- Literal meaning: Invincible East
Transcriptions
Standard Mandarin
- Hanyu Pinyin: Dōngfāng Bùbaì
Yue: Cantonese
- Jyutping: Dung^{1}-fong^{1} Bat^{1}-baai^{6}

Dongfang Bubai (東方不敗), literally "Invincible East", is a fictional character in the wuxia novel The Smiling, Proud Wanderer by Jin Yong. He is the leader of the Sun Moon Holy Cult (日月神教), an "unorthodox" martial arts sect. In his bid to become the most powerful martial artist in the jianghu, he castrated himself to fulfil the prerequisite for learning the skills in a martial arts manual known as the Sunflower Manual (葵花寶典). His castration and supreme prowess in martial arts make him a memorable character even though he appears in only one chapter of the novel.

Created during the Cultural Revolution, Dongfang Bubai and the Sun Moon Holy Cult – both names alluding to the propaganda song "The East Is Red" – serve as allegories for Mao Zedong and the Chinese Communist Party. Since Brigitte Lin's portrayal of the character as a trans woman in the 1992 Hong Kong film Swordsman II, Dongfang Bubai's role has been greatly expanded and the character has become a queer icon in Chinese popular culture. From the 2010s onwards, censorship of LGBT themes in China has led to non-queer reinterpretations of the character in television series and films.

== Role in the novel ==
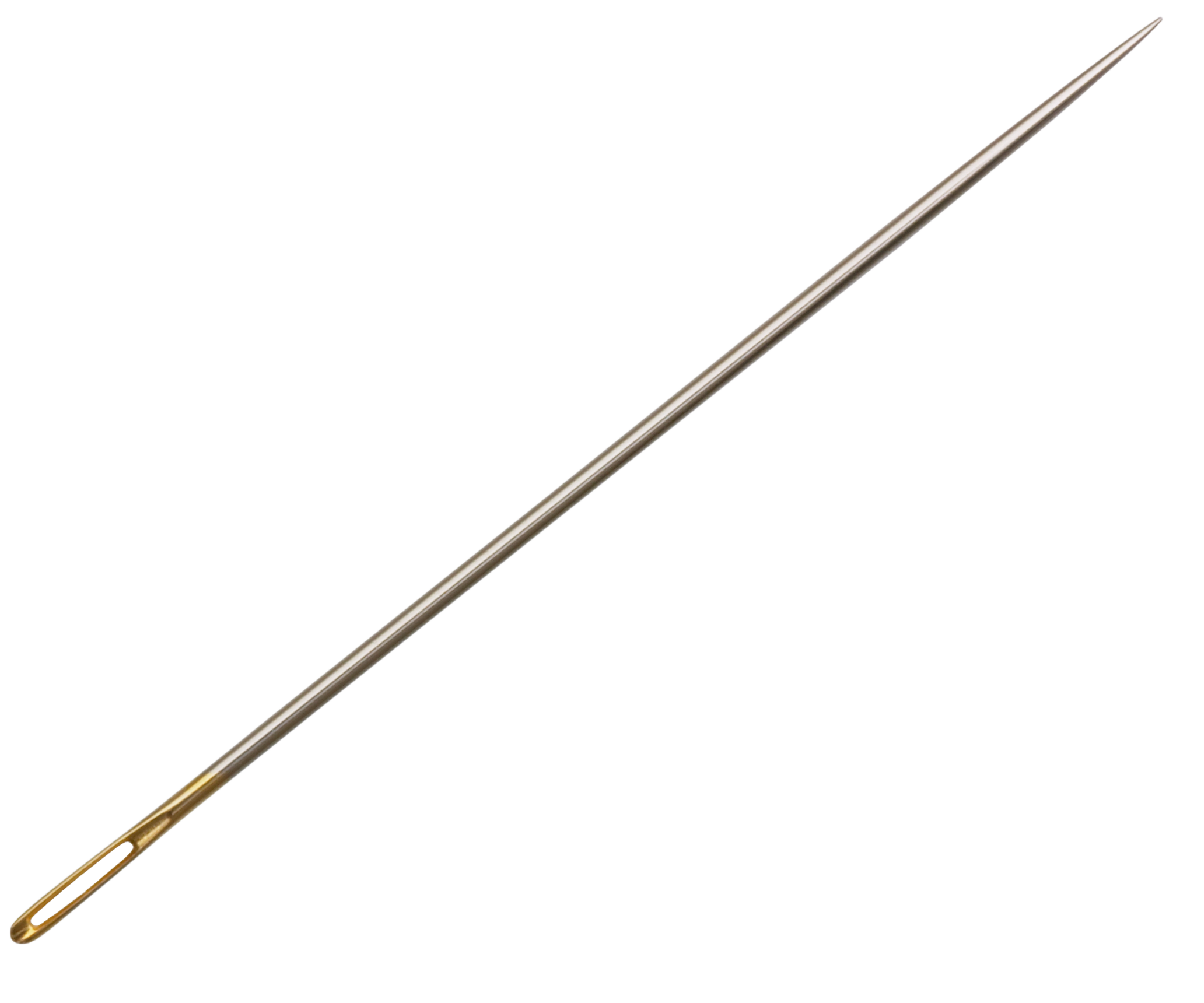
Needles are Dongfang Bubai's main weapons.

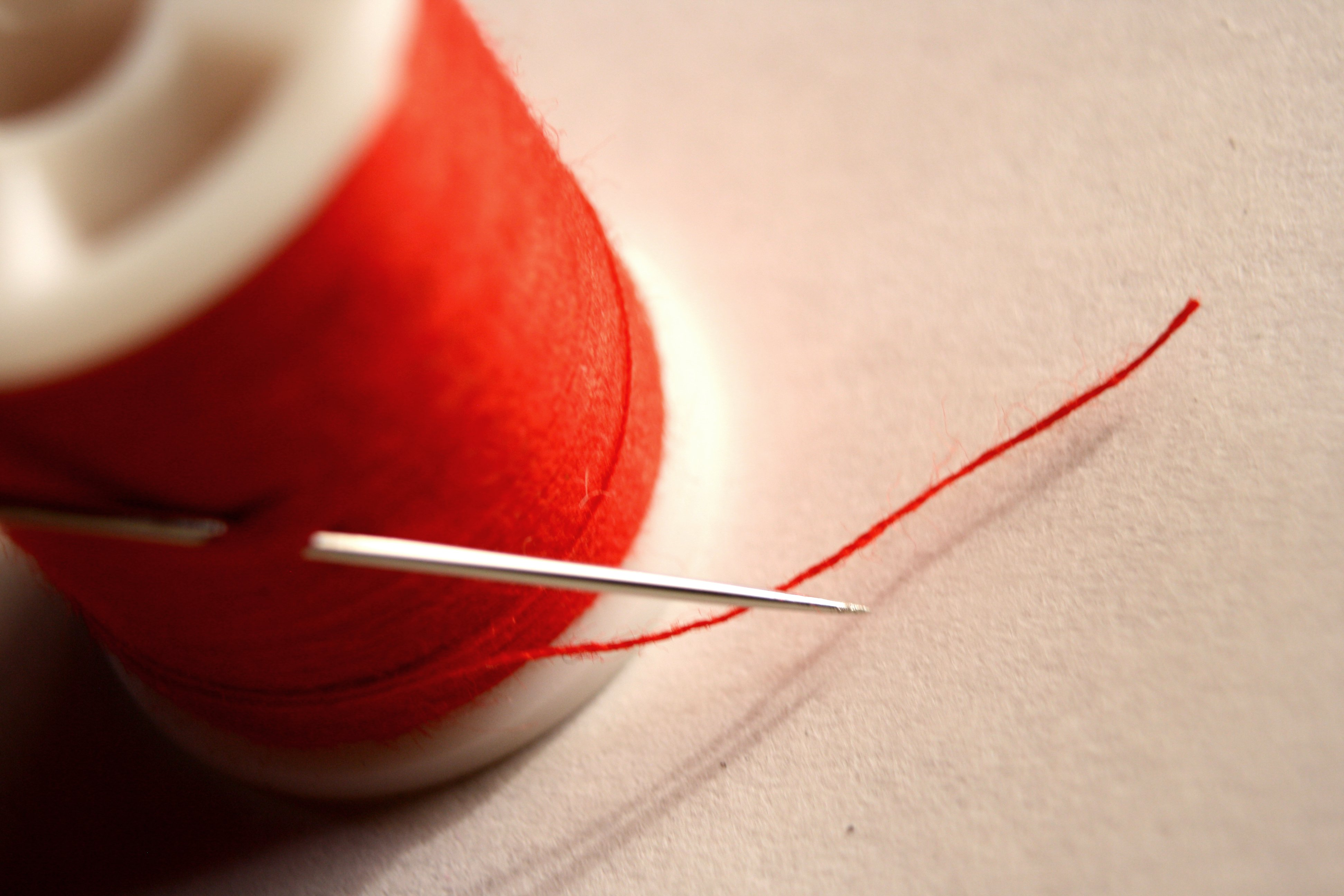
The flying needles used by Dongfang Bubai, typically with red strings attached.

Dongfang Bubai appears in only one chapter of the novel, yet he is pivotal and indispensable to the essence of the story and is continually referenced throughout the novel. For example, Ren Woxing ranks him first on a list of "three and a half" persons he most respects and admires. He is first mentioned by name in the novel as the second-in-command of Ren Woxing, the leader of the Sun Moon Holy Cult. Having launched a coup to seize the cult's leadership position from Ren Woxing, he has imprisoned Ren in an underground dungeon in Hangzhou. He treats his subordinates cruelly and forces them to submit to him by making them consume poison pills. After taking the pill, the person will suffer a long and painful death. However, if the person submits to him and obeys his orders, they will be given an antidote to temporarily ease their suffering for a limited period of time.

Dongfang Bubai castrated himself to fulfil the prerequisite for learning the skills in the Sunflower Manual and has become a nearly-invincible martial artist after mastering those skills. However, his personality has become more feminine and he has developed an intimate relationship with a male lover, Yang Lianting, whom he delegates his duties to.

Ren Woxing eventually escapes the dungeon with Linghu Chong's help and gradually wins back allegiance from the cult members. Ren Woxing, along with his daughter Ren Yingying, Linghu Chong, and cult elder Xiang Wentian, sneak back to the cult to confront Dongfang Bubai. In the ensuing fight, Dongfang Bubai has the upper hand despite being outnumbered three-to-one. However, he loses focus after Yang Lianting is injured and abused by Ren Yingying on the sidelines. His three opponents seize the opportunity to inflict devastating blows on him. Dongfang Bubai is critically wounded and eventually killed by Ren Woxing. Just before his death, he manages to blind Ren Woxing in one eye with a needle.

== Sunflower Manual ==
The Sunflower Manual (葵花寶典) was written by a eunuch and has been passed down for 300 years before it came into the possession of Hongye, the abbot of the Southern Shaolin Monastery. Yue Su and Cai Zifeng, two members of the Mount Hua Sect, heard of the manual and plotted to steal it under the guise of visiting Southern Shaolin. One night, they sneaked into the Shaolin library to find the manual and each memorised half of the book in an attempt to copy it. After returning to Mount Hua, they tried to piece together what they had read, but the final copy turned out to be incomprehensible. Nevertheless, each of them managed to integrate what they had learnt into their existing skills, and became more powerful. However, over time, a rift developed between them, resulting in the Mount Hua Sect splitting into two factions: one focusing on swordsmanship, led by Cai Zifeng; the other focusing more on neigong, led by Yue Su.

Hongye realised the inherent dangers of learning the skills in the Sunflower Manual so he sent a monk, Duyuan, to mediate the conflict between the two factions. Yue Su and Cai Zifeng agreed to a truce and sought Duyuan's help in better understanding the manual. Duyuan, having never read the manual before, was able to piece together their individual recollections and compiled a comprehensible version of the manual. This manual later fell into the Sun Moon Holy Cult's hands when the cult took advantage of the Mount Hua Sect's internal conflict to attack them; Yue Su and Cai Zifeng were both killed during the raid.

While working on the manual, Duyuan fell under its evil influence and his mind became corrupted. He secretly created a new skill, the Bixie Swordplay (辟邪劍法), based on his interpretation of the manual, and wrote a manual for it on his kasaya. Afterwards, he renounced his vows as a monk and returned to secular life, reassuming his former name Lin Yuantu. His mastery of the Bixie Swordplay brought him fame in the jianghu. The Bixie Swordplay bears similarities to the Sunflower Manual, one of which is that any man who wishes to learn the skills must be castrated, or else he will die from neigong imbalance. Lin Yuantu had forbidden his adopted son and descendants from learning the Bixie Swordplay and hidden the manual in the Lin residence.

Both the Mount Hua Sect's copy of the Sunflower Manual and the Bixie Swordplay manual contain only a fraction of the original contents of the Sunflower Manual. The Mount Hua Sect's copy is ultimately taken from Dongfang Bubai after his defeat, and destroyed by Ren Woxing, while the original copy was destroyed by Hongye in Southern Shaolin. The Bixie Swordplay manual, written on Duyuan's kasaya, ends up in the hands of his descendant Lin Pingzhi, who destroys it.

== Appearances in media ==
Dongfang Bubai's captivating and provocative character has enabled his role to be largely expanded in films and television series adapted from the novel.

=== Film ===
In early adaptations, Dongfang Bubai was portrayed by actors in a way consistent with Jin Yong's depiction of the character as unflattering and satirical, particularly in regard to sexuality. The character's depiction shifted with Swordsman II (1992), in which Brigitte Lin’s androgynous, transgender female interpretation gained wide popularity. The film's plot differs largely from the novel and Dongfang Bubai is given a more prominent role as the primary antagonist.

The following year, the sequel film The East Is Red featured Dongfang Bubai as the main character. The East Is Red is unrelated to the novel except for its Chinese title Dongfang Bubai zhi Fengyun Zaiqi, which roughly translates to The Return of Dongfang Bubai.

Lin's portrayal of Dongfang Bubai significantly influenced subsequent screen interpretations of the character: in the 2000s, the character was generally portrayed as a trans woman, with portrayals presenting gender and sexuality in a more positive light, until China's censorship of LGBT content in the 2010s led to the character being typically depicted as either a cishet man or woman.

=== Television ===
Notable actors and actresses who have portrayed Dongfang Bubai in television series include:

- Kong Ngai in The Smiling, Proud Wanderer (1984);
- Henry Lo in State of Divinity (1996);
- Leanne Liu in State of Divinity (2000);
- Jacelyn Tay in The Legendary Swordsman (2000);
- Mao Weitao in Laughing in the Wind (2001);
- Joe Chen in Swordsman (2013);
- Ding Yuxi in New Smiling, Proud Wanderer (2018).

=== Comics ===
A manhua series titled Dongfang Bubai was drawn in 1991 by Hong Kong artist Khoo Fuk-lung.

=== Music ===
The Chinese techno artist Tzusing released an experimental techno album titled 東方不敗 in February 2017.

== Analogues ==
Dongfang Bubai inspired the character Master Asia in the anime Mobile Fighter G Gundam. Master Asia is also known as Tohō Fuhai, which is the Japanese reading of the Hanzi characters as Kanji.

In the manga Rosario + Vampire, the character Dongfang Bubai is a yōkai and he leads a triad family.
