= Cageman =

1992 Hong Kong film by Jacob Cheung

- Film poster

Chinese name
- Traditional Chinese: 籠民
Transcriptions
- Directed by: Jacob Cheung
- Written by: Jacob Cheung; Ng Chong Chau; Wong Yank
- Produced by: Jacob Cheung
- Starring: Roy Chiao; Liu Kai-chi; Wong Ka Kui; Victor Wong; Teddy Robin; Chow Chung; Bowie Wu
- Cinematography: Andy Lam
- Edited by: Chang Shao-Hsi (as Henry Cheung)
- Music by: Eugene Pao
- Production company: Filmagica Productions Limited
- Release date: November 18, 1992 (Hong Kong)
- Running time: 144 minutes
- Country: Hong Kong
- Language: Cantonese

Cageman (Chinese: 籠民) is a 1992 Hong Kong satirical comedy-drama film directed by Jacob Cheung. It won four awards at the 12th Hong Kong Film Awards held in 1993, including Best Film.

== Plot ==
The movie explores the lives of tenants of the Wah Ha cage-house, who refuse to be evicted from their cage-homes after the landlord announces he will take the building back and demolish it.

== Cast ==
- Roy Chiao – Koo Yiu-Cho aka Fatso, the person in charge of the cage-house who collects rents and pays them to the landlord
- Liu Kai-chi – Prince Sam, Koo Yiu-Cho's adult son who has intellectual disability
- Wong Ka Kui – Mao, Lam Tsung's adopted son who joins to live with the tenants and has a criminal past
- Michael Lee Ming-Yeung – 7–11, a 99-year-old tenant who sells goods to other tenants
- Victor Wong – Sissy, a tenant who is close friends with 7-11 and assists him
- Teddy Robin – Tong Sam aka Monkey Man, a short tenant who owns a pet monkey named Tucker
- Lau Shun – Taoist, a philosophical tenant who always carries a bottle of wine with him
- Joe Junior – Charlie, a former tenant who often visits the cage-house and brings food for other tenants
- Ku Feng – Luk Tung, a tenant who works as a handyman
- Tats Lau – Brother Sang
- Chow Chung – Councillor Chow
- Dennis Chan – Councillor Tsui
- Bowie Wu – Officer Lam Tsung, Mao's adoptive father
- Teddy Chan – Possession order messenger
- Sze Kai-Keung – TV interviewer
- Herman Yau – TV director
- Tang Cheung – Dai Lap Hing

== Production ==
In an interview for EasternKicks, Cheung said that the idea to make a film about Hong Kong's housing issues came from a newspaper reporter, who had hoped that the director would help draw the general public's attention to this matter.

== Awards and nominations ==
Awards and nominations
Ceremony	Category	Recipient	Outcome
12th Hong Kong Film Awards	Best Film	Cageman	Won
12th Hong Kong Film Awards	Best Director	Jacob Cheung	Won
12th Hong Kong Film Awards	Best Screenplay	Yank Wong, Ng Chong Chau and Jacob Cheung	Won
12th Hong Kong Film Awards	Best Supporting Actor	Liu Kai-chi	Won
12th Hong Kong Film Awards	Best Art Direction	Yank Wong and Chin Yiu-Hang	Nominated

== Post-release ==
In March 2026, M+ announced that they had restored Cageman under their film preservation program, M+ Restored. The restored film had its international premiere at the 50th Hong Kong International Film Festival in April 2026, as well as the Far East Film Festival that same month. Distributor Kani Releasing also announced plans to distribute the film in North America.

Awards and achievements
Preceded by To Be Number One	Hong Kong Film Awards for Best Film; 1993	Succeeded by C'est la vie, mon chéri
