= Raymond Lee (director) =

Raymond Lee Wai-Man
- Born: 10 August 1949 (age 77); Hong Kong

Chinese name
- Chinese: 李惠民
Transcriptions
Standard Mandarin
- Hanyu Pinyin: Lǐ Huìmín

Raymond Lee Wai Man (Chinese: 李惠民; born 10 August 1949) is a Hong Kong director and television producer. Lee entered the Hong Kong film industry in 1972, initially working as a camera operator. After the closure of Commercial Television in 1978, Lee joined Asia Television working as screenwriter for martial arts films. In 1981, he left Asia Television to work as a producer at TVB.

Since 1992, Lee has mostly directed movies in mainland China. He was the recipient of the 1996 Golden Bell Awards as Best Director for New Dragon Gate Inn.

== Selected filmography ==
As director

- The Last Conflict (1988, TV film)
- Set Me Free! (1998)
- Tour of Revenge (1989)
- The Killer's Blues (1990)
- Rebel from China (1990)
- Blue Lightning (1991)
- Once a Killer (1991)
- New Dragon Gate Inn (1992)
- The East Is Red (1993, co-directed with Ching Siu-tung)
- Fatal Obsession (1994)
- The Other Side of the Sea (1994)
- I Want to Go On Living (1995)
- Police Confidential (1995)
- To Be No. 1 (1996)
- Assassinator Jing Ke (2004, TV series)
- The Shaolin Warriors (2008, TV series)
- Invincible Knights Errant (2011, TV series)

As producer

- The Other Side of the Horizon (1984)
- Sword Stained with Royal Blood (1985)
- The Treasure Hunter (2009)
