= King of Beggars =

1992 Hong Kong film by Gordon Chan

- DVD cover
- 武狀元蘇乞兒
- Directed by: Gordon Chan
- Written by: Gordon Chan; John Chan
- Produced by: Stephen Shiu
- Starring: Stephen Chow; Sharla Cheung; Ng Man-tat; Norman Chui
- Cinematography: David Chung; Ma Koon-wah
- Edited by: Mei Fung; Kwong Chi-leung; Yu Sai-lun
- Music by: Joseph Koo
- Production company: Win's Movie Productions
- Distributed by: Gala Film Distribution
- Release date: 17 December 1992
- Running time: 100 minutes
- Country: Hong Kong
- Language: Cantonese
- Box office: HK$38.62 million

King of Beggars (武狀元蘇乞兒) is a 1992 Hong Kong martial arts comedy film directed by Gordon Chan, starring Stephen Chow, Sharla Cheung, Ng Man-tat, and Norman Chui. The story is loosely based on legends about the martial artist Su Can (better known as "Beggar Su"), who lived during the late Qing dynasty (c. 19th century) and was one of the Ten Tigers of Canton.

The film was one of the highest grossing films at the 1993 Hong Kong box office and among the highest grossing Chinese-language films in Taipei in the same year.

== Synopsis ==
Su Can, a highly-skilled martial artist, is the lazy, spoiled and illiterate son of a wealthy general in Guangzhou. While visiting a brothel, he meets and gets romantically attracted to Rushuang, a Beggar Clan member who has disguised herself as a prostitute to take revenge against Zhao Wuji, a high-ranking official who killed her father. Rushuang agrees to marry Su if he gets the top position in the imperial military examination.

Accepting the challenge, Su takes the examination and beats the other candidates in the physical tests, while his father helps him cheat in the written test. Just as Su is about to receive the honour of the top position from the emperor, Zhao accuses Su of cheating and exposes the fact that Su is illiterate. As punishment, Su and his father are condemned by the emperor to live as beggars. While enforcing the emperor's decree, Zhao breaks Su's legs, rendering him unable to practise martial arts again.

Su sinks into despair and spends most of his time sleeping. He and his father join the Beggar Clan, but he is too ashamed to face Rushuang. By chance, he encounters an elderly beggar who helps him recover and teaches him the "Sleeping Arhat" fighting style. Later, he tricks the Beggar Clan into naming him their new chief by pretending to be possessed by Hong Qigong's spirit. Thereafter, he learns the clan's legendary skill "Eighteen Dragon-Subduing Palms".

In the meantime, Rushuang has been captured by Zhao, who hypnotises her and attempts to use her to assassinate the emperor. Su leads the beggars to rescue Rushuang, crossing the Great Wall. He confronts Zhao and eventually defeats him, saving both Rushuang and the emperor.

In the end, the grateful emperor asks Su what reward he wants, to which Su replies that he prefers to remain a beggar. Su and Rushuang are married and they wander the streets with their children, using a tablet from the emperor to force rich people to give them money.

== Cast ==
- Stephen Chow as Su Can
- Sharla Cheung as Rushuang
- Ng Man-tat as the General of Guangzhou
- Norman Chui as Zhao Wuji
- Vindy Chan as Xiaocui
- Natalis Chan as the Minister of Personnel
- Lawrence Cheng as the Su family's adviser
- Matthew Wong as the Emperor
- Peter Lai as the chief examiner
- Lam Wai as Sengge Rinchen
- Jackson Ng as Botaroto
- Wong Chung as Mo Laosan
- Kingdom Yuen as the brothel owner
- Yuen Cheung-yan as Hong Riqing
- Chow Kam-kong as a constable
- Tang Tai-wo as a Beggar Clan elder
- Chow Yee-fun as Niu Dachun
- Lee Kin-yan as the lady in red
- Yang Mi as Su Can's daughter
- Lin Hsiu-wei as the exotic beauty

== Music ==
The film's theme song, "The Long Road Accompanies You on Your Adventures" (長路漫漫伴你闖), was sung by George Lam in Cantonese.

== Release ==
King of Beggars was released in Taiwan in December 1992. The film was among the highest grossing Chinese-language films of 1993 in Taiwan, earning NT$41.88 million.

King of Beggars was the third highest grossing film in Hong Kong for 1993, where it grossed HK$38.62 million. It was topped by Flirting Scholar and Jurassic Park at the 1993 Hong Kong box office.

== Award nominations ==
Awards and nominations
| Ceremony | Category | Recipient | Outcome |
|---|---|---|---|
| 12th Hong Kong Film Awards | Best Film | King of Beggars | Nominated |
| 12th Hong Kong Film Awards | Best Director | Gordon Chan | Nominated |
| 12th Hong Kong Film Awards | Best Screenplay | John Chan & Gordon Chan | Nominated |
| 12th Hong Kong Film Awards | Best Cinematography | David Chung | Nominated |
| 12th Hong Kong Film Awards | Best Original Film Score | Joseph Koo | Nominated |
| 12th Hong Kong Film Awards | Best Original Film Song | "The Long Road Accompanies You on Your Adventures" composed by Joseph Koo, sung by George Lam, and lyrics by James Wong Jim | Nominated |
| 30th Golden Horse Awards | Best Original Film Song | Joseph Koo | Nominated |
