= Ching Siu-tung =

Hong Kong film director

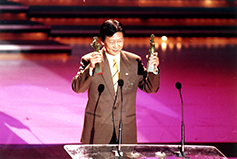
- Ching in 1992
- Born: Ching Tung-er (程冬儿); 31 October 1953 (age 72); British Hong Kong
- Awards: Hong Kong Film Awards – Best Action Choreography; 1987 Witch from Nepal; 1991 The Swordsman; 2003 Hero Golden Horse Awards – Best Action Choreography; 1992 New Dragon Gate Inn; 2001 Shaolin Soccer

Chinese name
- Traditional Chinese: 程小東
- Simplified Chinese: 程小东
Transcriptions
Standard Mandarin
- Hanyu Pinyin: Chéng Xiǎodōng

Tony Ching Siu-tung (Chinese: 程小東; born Ching Tung'er on 31 October 1953), also rendered Cheng Xiaodong, is a Hong Kong action choreographer, actor, film director and producer, who has directed over 20 films, including the critically acclaimed supernatural fantasy A Chinese Ghost Story (1987). He produced the expensive music video for "L'Âme-stram-gram" by the French singer Mylène Farmer in the style of A Chinese Ghost Story at a cost of €1 million. He studied in the Eastern Drama Academy and trained in Northern Style Kung Fu for 7 years.

== Early life ==
Ching was born in Hong Kong, to parents who had relocated from Shou County, Anhui. He is the son of martial arts film director Cheng Kang (also known as Cheng Gang or Ching Gong). As a child, he attended Hong Kong Oriental Drama School for seven years. He first became involved in his father's films at age 17 by acting as a stuntman.

== Career ==
Ching began as an actor and martial arts instructor working in Hong Kong action cinema in the 1960s and 1970s (his father, Ching Gong, was a Shaw Brothers Studio director, and Ching Siu-tung had been trained in Peking opera as a child), but he made his directorial debut in 1982 with the ground-breaking wuxia classic Duel to the Death.

Ching worked with producer Tsui Hark on 1987's A Chinese Ghost Story, which became an international sensation, although it was usually Tsui Hark who took most of the plaudits. He continued to work with Tsui Hark, directing sequels to that film in 1990 and 1991, and co-directing all three parts of the Swordsman series, starting in 1990.

Ching continued his role as action director / choreographer throughout this period, and has continued to work in that role on high-profile international successes like Shaolin Soccer (2001), Hero (2002), and House of Flying Daggers (2004).

In 2002, Ching was nominated twice for Best Action Choreography at the Hong Kong Film Awards, and won in 2003 for his efforts on Hero. That same year, he made his American film debut, directing Steven Seagal in the direct-to-video feature Belly of the Beast. In 2006, he choreographed the action scenes in the Indian superhero film Krrish, for which he won a Filmfare Best Action Award and Zee Cine Award.

In 2008, Ching directed An Empress and the Warriors, in which he also served as action choreographer. The film stars Kelly Chen, Donnie Yen and Leon Lai.

== Filmography ==
=== Director ===
Year	Title	Notes
1983	Duel to the Death	
1986	Witch from Nepal	
1987	A Chinese Ghost Story	
1989	A Terra-Cotta Warrior	
1990	The Swordsman	
1990	A Chinese Ghost Story II	
1991	The Raid	
1991	A Chinese Ghost Story III	
1992	Swordsman II	
1993	Swordsman III	
1993	Executioners	
1994	Wonder Seven	
1996	Dr. Wai in "The Scripture with No Words"	
1997	The Longest Day	
2000	Conman in Tokyo	
2002	Naked Weapon	
2003	Belly of the Beast	
2008	An Empress and the Warriors	
2011	The Sorcerer and the White Snake	
2019	Jade Dynasty	

=== Action choreographer ===
Year	Title	Notes
1987	A Better Tomorrow II	
1992	New Dragon Gate Inn	
1993	Butterfly and Sword	
1993	The Mad Monk	
2001	Shaolin Soccer	
2002	Hero	
2004	House of Flying Daggers	
2005	The Royal Swordsmen	television series
2006	Krrish	
2006	Curse of the Golden Flower	
2007	In the Name of the King: A Dungeon Siege Tale	
2008	Irumbu Kottai Murattu Singam	
2013	Krrish 3	
