= The East Is Red (1993 film) =

1993 Hong Kong film by Ching Siu-tung and Raymond Lee

- Theatrical release poster
- Traditional Chinese: 東方不敗 - 風雲再起
- Simplified Chinese: 东方不败 - 风云再起
- Literal meaning: East the Invincible - The Storm is Rising Again
Transcriptions
Standard Mandarin
- Hanyu Pinyin: Dōngfāng Bùbài - Fēngyún Zàiqǐ
Yue: Cantonese
- Jyutping: Dung¹ Fong¹ Bat¹ Baai⁶ - Fung¹ Wan⁴ Zoi³ Hei²
- Directed by: Ching Siu-tung; Raymond Lee
- Screenplay by: Roy Sze-to; Charcoal Tan; Tsui Hark
- Produced by: Tsui Hark
- Starring: Brigitte Lin; Joey Wong; Yu Rongguang
- Cinematography: Tom Lau
- Edited by: Chun Yu; Keung Chuen-tak
- Music by: William Hu
- Production companies: Film Workshop; Long Shong Pictures; Golden Princess Film Production
- Distributed by: Newport Entertainment
- Release date: 21 January 1993
- Running time: 93 minutes
- Country: Hong Kong
- Language: Cantonese
- Box office: HK$11,248,503

The East Is Red (東方不敗 - 風雲再起), also known as Swordsman III and The Great China Warrior, is a 1993 Hong Kong wuxia film produced by Tsui Hark and co-directed by Ching Siu-tung and Raymond Lee, starring Brigitte Lin, Joey Wong and Yu Rongguang. The protagonist is loosely based on Dongfang Bubai, a minor character in the novel The Smiling, Proud Wanderer by Jin Yong. The film is considered a sequel to The Swordsman and Swordsman II.

== Synopsis ==
Following Dongfang Bubai's apparent death, the jianghu sinks into chaos as it lacks a dominant figure to maintain the status quo. Several imposters use Dongfang Bubai's name to rally supporters to form their own clans and fight for power. One of Dongfang Bubai's devoted lovers, Xue Qianxun, rebuilds the Sun Moon Cult by impersonating Dongfang Bubai.

The imperial government sends a naval admiral, Gu Changfeng, to assist the Spanish in searching for the remains of a Dutch warship sunk near the site of Dongfang Bubai's apparent death. At the cliff, Gu Changfeng discovers that Dongfang Bubai is still alive, and manages to convince him to return to the jianghu.

Dongfang Bubai unleashes his fury and starts a bloodbath by eliminating all the impostors. Upon learning that Xue Qianxun has been impersonating him, he injures her in anger. Consumed by his desire for power, Dongfang Bubai decides to realise his ambition to unite the jianghu under his rule.

Gu Changfeng realises that Dongfang Bubai has gone out of control so he leads the imperial navy to fight Dongfang Bubai and his Spanish and Japanese allies. In the ensuing naval battle, all the warships are destroyed and Dongfang Bubai emerges victorious after defeating Gu Changfeng. When Xue Qianxun is killed, Dongfang Bubai realises his mistake and embraces his dead lover as he retires from the jianghu again.

== Cast ==
- Brigitte Lin as Dongfang Bubai
- Joey Wong as Xue Qianxun
- Yu Rongguang as Gu Changfeng
- Wang Ching-ying as Dai Zushi
- Eddy Ko as Hanqing
- Lau Shun as a Dongfang Bubai impostor
- Kingdom Yuen as a rōnin
- Lam Ching-ying as a wokou
- Lee Ka-ding as Tian Qiyun

== Release ==
The East Is Red was released in Hong Kong on January 21, 1993. In the Philippines, the film was released as The Great China Warrior by World Films in April 1995.

=== Critical response ===
The film received a positive review from the Los Angeles Times.
