= The Swordsman (1990 film) =

1990 Hong Kong film by King Hu and Tsui Hark

- Film poster
- 笑傲江湖
- Directed by: King Hu; Ching Siu-tung; Tsui Hark; Raymond Lee
- Screenplay by: Wong Ying; Edward Leung; Tai Foo-ho; Lam Kee-to; Lau Tai-muk; Kwan Man-leung
- Based on: The Smiling, Proud Wanderer by Jin Yong
- Produced by: Tsui Hark
- Starring: Samuel Hui; Cecilia Yip; Jacky Cheung; Sharla Cheung; Fennie Yuen; Lau Siu-ming
- Cinematography: Andy Lam; Peter Pau
- Edited by: Marco Mak; David Wu
- Music by: Romeo Díaz; James Wong
- Production companies: Golden Princess Film Production; Long Shong Pictures; Film Workshop
- Distributed by: Newport Entertainment
- Release date: 5 April 1990
- Running time: 120 minutes
- Country: Hong Kong
- Language: Cantonese
- Box office: HK$16,052,552

The Swordsman (笑傲江湖), also known as Swordsman, is a 1990 Hong Kong wuxia film loosely adapted from the novel The Smiling Proud Wanderer by Jin Yong. King Hu was credited as the director although he allegedly left the project midway, and the film was completed by a team led by producer Tsui Hark. It was followed by two sequels: Swordsman II (1992) and The East Is Red (1993).

== Synopsis ==
The story is set in 16th-century China. Gu Jinfu, a eunuch from the Eastern Depot, is sent to retrieve the Sunflower Manual, a martial arts manual stolen from the imperial palace. They track down and attack the thief, Lin Zhennan. Around this time, Linghu Chong and Yue Lingshan, members of the Mount Hua Sect, save Lin Zhennan. Before succumbing to his wounds, Lin Zhennan tells them to inform his son, Lin Pingzhi, where he had hidden the manual.

On their way to rendezvous with their Mount Hua Sect fellows, Linghu Chong and Yue Lingshan chance upon Liu Zhengfeng and Qu Yang, who are retiring from the jianghu. Just then, Zuo Lengshan of the Eastern Depot shows up with his men and tries to arrest Liu Zhengfeng and Qu Yang. Linghu Chong and the others manage to escape, but Liu Zhengfeng and Qu Yang are seriously wounded in the process. Before committing suicide, the duo perform "Xiaoao Jianghu", a musical piece they composed together, and pass their instruments and the score to Linghu Chong.

Linghu Chong encounters the reclusive swordsman Feng Qingyang and learns the skill "Nine Swords of Dugu" from him. He also finds out that his gentlemanly master, Yue Buqun, is actually a power-hungry hypocrite. In the meantime, Gu Jinfu's henchman, Ouyang Quan, impersonates the dead Lin Pingzhi and infiltrates the Mount Hua Sect. He tricks Linghu Chong into revealing the whereabouts of the Sunflower Manual and then poisons him. Linghu Chong is saved by Ren Yingying and Lan Fenghuang of the Sun Moon Holy Cult. They combine forces to defeat and kill Zuo Lengshan and his men.

Around the same time, Yue Buqun, Ouyang Quan, Gu Jinfu and the others have arrived at the location where the Sunflower Manual is hidden and are fighting over the manual. Linghu Chong shows up, kills Gu Jinfu, exposes Yue Buqun's treachery and defeats him. He decides to spend the rest of his life roaming the jianghu with his friends.

== Cast ==
- Samuel Hui as Linghu Chong
- Cecilia Yip as Yue Lingshan
- Jacky Cheung as Ouyang Quan
- Sharla Cheung as Ren Yingying
- Fennie Yuen as Lan Fenghuang
- Lau Siu-ming as Yue Buqun
- Wu Ma as Liu Zhengfeng
- Lam Ching-ying as Qu Yang
- Yuen Wah as Zuo Lengshan
- Lau Shun as Gu Jinfu
- Cheung Ming-man as Lu Dayou
- Kam Shan as Lin Zhennan
- Han Ying-chieh as Feng Qingyang

== Music ==
The theme song, "A Sound of Laughter in the Vast Sea" (滄海一聲笑), was composed by James Wong, who also wrote its lyrics, and performed in Cantonese by Samuel Hui and also in Mandarin by Lo Ta-Yu, James Wong and Tsui Hark.

== Box office ==
The film grossed HK$16,052,552 at the Hong Kong box office.

== Reception ==
Andrew Saroch of Far East Films writes that

"Swordsman is undoubtedly a film that improves with successive viewings. Initial impressions are that this is a convoluted and confusing swordplay film that attracts the eye with its visual flair, but is ultimately easier to admire than to warm to. However, on second and especially third viewing, Swordsman reveals more of its hidden depths and draws the now prepared viewer into its character-laden storyline".

== Awards and nominations ==
Awards and nominations
Ceremony	Category	Recipient	Outcome
10th Hong Kong Film Awards	Best Supporting Actor	Jacky Cheung	Nominated
10th Hong Kong Film Awards	Best Supporting Actor	Lau Shun	Nominated
10th Hong Kong Film Awards	Best Film Editing	David Wu, Marco Mak	Nominated
10th Hong Kong Film Awards	Best Art Direction	James Leung	Nominated
10th Hong Kong Film Awards	Best Action Choreography	Ching Siu-tung	Won
10th Hong Kong Film Awards	Best Original Film Score	James Wong, Romeo Diaz	Nominated
10th Hong Kong Film Awards	Best Original Film Song	Song: A Sound of Laughter in the Vast Sea (滄海一聲笑) Composer/Lyricist: James Wong; Singer: Sam Hui	Won
27th Golden Horse Awards	Best Feature Film	The Swordsman'	Nominated
27th Golden Horse Awards	Best Supporting Actor	Jacky Cheung	Won
27th Golden Horse Awards	Best Adapted Screenplay	Kwan Man-leung, Wong Ying, Lam Kee-to; Lau Tai-muk, Edward Leung, Tai Foo-ho	Nominated
27th Golden Horse Awards	Best Cinematography	Andy Lam, Peter Pau	Nominated
27th Golden Horse Awards	Best Art Direction	James Leung	Nominated
27th Golden Horse Awards	Best Makeup & Costume Design	Bobo Ng, Edith Cheung	Nominated
27th Golden Horse Awards	Best Film Editing	David Wu, Marco Mak	Nominated
27th Golden Horse Awards	Best Original Film Song Award	James Wong	Won
