= Swordsman II =

1992 Hong Kong film by Ching Siu-tung

- Theatrical poster
- 笑傲江湖之東方不敗
- Directed by: Ching Siu-tung
- Screenplay by: Hanson Chan; Tang Pik-yin; Tsui Hark
- Based on: The Smiling, Proud Wanderer by Jin Yong
- Produced by: Tsui Hark
- Starring: Jet Li; Brigitte Lin; Rosamund Kwan; Michelle Reis
- Cinematography: Tom Lau
- Edited by: Marco Mak
- Music by: Richard Yuen
- Production companies: Film Workshop; Long Shong Pictures; Golden Princess Film Production
- Distributed by: Golden Princess Amusement
- Release dates: 24 January 1992 (Taiwan); 25 March 1992 (South Korea); 26 June 1992 (HK)
- Running time: 107 minutes (Hong Kong); 99 minutes (United States); 112 minutes (Taiwan)
- Country: Hong Kong
- Language: Cantonese
- Box office: HK$34,462,861

Swordsman II (笑傲江湖之東方不敗), also known as The Legend of the Swordsman, is a 1992 Hong Kong wuxia film loosely adapted from the novel The Smiling, Proud Wanderer by Jin Yong. It was the second part of a trilogy: preceded by The Swordsman (1990) and followed by The East Is Red (1993). Directed by Ching Siu-tung, Swordsman II starred Jet Li, Brigitte Lin, Rosamund Kwan and Michelle Reis in the leading roles. None of the original cast from the previous film return except Fennie Yuen.

Set in Ming dynasty China, the plot follows Linghu Chong, a swordsman from the Mount Hua Sect, who travels the countryside with Yue Lingshan, who secretly loves him. Caught in the war between the invading Japanese and the Sun Moon Cult, they discover that Dongfang Bubai, the evil leader of the Sun Moon Cult, has located the Sacred Scroll, which has transformed him into a woman while improving his martial arts prowess to near-invincibility. The film received generally positive reviews from critics.

== Synopsis ==
Linghu Chong, Yue Lingshan and members of the Mount Hua Sect are planning to retire from the jianghu. They learn that Dongfang Bubai has seized control of the Sun Moon Cult and is secretly plotting with some Japanese rōnin to start a rebellion against the Ming Empire. Dongfang Bubai had castrated himself to master the skills in a highly-coveted martial arts manual, and his appearance has become more feminine even though his prowess is near-invincible.

Linghu Chong meets Dongfang Bubai by chance without knowing his true identity, mistakes him for a woman, and falls in love with "her". Dongfang Bubai knocks out Linghu Chong and imprisons him in an underground dungeon. In the dungeon, by coincidence, Linghu Chong meets Ren Woxing, Ren Yingying's father and the former leader of the Sun Moon Cult. They escape from captivity together and meet Xiang Wentian, a cult elder loyal to Ren Woxing. One night, Dongfang Bubai tracks down the Mount Hua Sect members and kills them while his lover Shishi distracts Linghu Chong.

Linghu Chong takes Yue Lingshan, Ren Yingying, Ren Woxing and Xiang Wentian with him to confront Dongfang Bubai on a cliff. In the ensuing battle, Dongfang Bubai apparently dies after falling off the cliff. Ren Woxing regains control of the cult and starts killing those who pledged loyalty to Dongfang Bubai. Linghu Chong and Yue Lingshan secretly escape with help from Xiang Wentian and Ren Yingying because they know that Ren Woxing cannot tolerate them.

== Cast ==
- Jet Li as Linghu Chong
- Brigitte Lin as Dongfang Bubai
- Michelle Reis as Yue Lingshan
- Rosamund Kwan as Ren Yingying
- Waise Lee as Hattori Sengun
- Chin Kar-lok as Sarutobi Kazuki
- Lau Shun as Xiang Wentian
- Fennie Yuen as Lan Fenghuang
- Yen Shi-kwan as Ren Woxing
- Candice Yu as Shishi
- Cheung Kwok-leung as Eunuch Hong

== Alternative versions ==
The United States version has nine minutes of the original film cut and was released under the title Legend of the Swordsman. It is dubbed in English and retains the original music score.

The Hong Kong version is in Cantonese and it retains the nine minutes of extended footage and gory violence.

The Taiwanese version, which is dubbed in Mandarin, contains an additional four minutes of rare extended and gory footage that was removed in the United States and Hong Kong releases, bringing the total runtime to 112 minutes. It has some different music scores and features Jet Li's original voice. It has aired on Chinese Television System many times.

== Production ==
In the Mandarin-dubbed version of the film, Rosamund Kwan and Fennie Yuen speak Sichuanese instead of Standard Mandarin. This was meant to enhance the fact that their characters are of the Miao ethnic group.

== Music ==
The original soundtrack album for the film, "Ching Hsia Lin/ Swordsman 2" (traditional Chinese: 東方不敗 － 林青霞 電影音樂紀實; simplified Chinese: 东方不败 －林青霞 电影音乐纪实; pinyin: Dōngfāng bù bài - línqīngxiá diànyǐng yīnyuè jìshí) was released by BMG Music Taiwan in 1992. It contains 20 tracks with 3 sound recordings at the scene.

Ching Hsia Lin/ Swordsman II OST 東方不敗－林青霞 電影音樂紀實

Soundtrack album by Various artists
- Released: 1992
- Languages: Mandarin; Cantonese
- Label: BMG Taiwan Music Inc

No.	Traditional Chinese title	Simplified Chinese title	Pinyin	English translation	Remarks
1	"東方不敗就在附近"	"东方不败就在附近"	Dōngfāng bù bài jiù zài fùjìn	"Dongfang Bubai is nearby"	Sound recording at the scene.
2	只記今朝笑（粵語）	只记今朝笑（粤语）	Zhǐ jì jīnzhāo xiào	Only remember the smile today	Ending theme; Cantonese version (vocals by Rosanne Lui).
3	退隱	退隐	Tuìyǐn	Retirement	
4	斷弦（粵語）	断弦（粤语）	Duànxián	Broken string	Cantonese version (vocals by 周小君).
5	"原來是你"	"原来是你"	Yuánlái shì nǐ	"It's you"	Sound recording at the scene.
6	伏擊	伏击	Fújí	Ambush	
7	邂逅	邂逅	Xièhòu	Encounter	
8	燒寶典	烧宝典	Shāo bǎodiǎn	Burning the scroll	
9	濃情	浓情	Nóng qíng	Passion	
10	天地醉（音樂版）	天地醉（音乐版）	Tiāndì zuì	Drunkenness of heaven and earth	
11	"望青霞"	"望青霞"	Wàng qīng xiá	"Looking at Brigitte"	Sound recording at the scene.
12	天地醉（國語）	天地醉（国语）	Tiāndì zuì	Drunkenness of heaven and earth	Mandarin version performed by Brigitte Lin (not in the film).
13	告別	告别	Gàobié	Biding farewell	
14	比劍	比剑	Bǐ jiàn	Sword match	
15	只記今朝笑（國語）	只记今朝笑（国语）	Zhǐ jì jīnzhāo xiào	Only remember the smile today	Ending theme; Mandarin version performed by Brigitte Lin.
16	圍攻	围攻	Wéigōng	Laying siege	
17	傾心	倾心	Qīngxīn	Admiration	
18	曲諧	曲谐	Qū xié	Harmonic tune	
19	斷弦（國語）	断弦（国语）	Duànxián	Broken string	Mandarin version
20	只記今朝笑（音樂版）	只记今朝笑（音乐版）	Zhǐ jì jīnzhāo xiào	Only remember the smile today	Music version

The theme song from The Swordsman, Chong Hoi Yat Sing Siu (traditional Chinese: 滄海一聲笑; simplified Chinese: 沧海一声笑; pinyin: Cānghǎi Yī Shēng Xiào; Jyutping: Cong1-hoi2 Jat1 Sing1 Siu3; lit. 'A Sound of Laughter in the Vast Sea'), performed in Cantonese by Samuel Hui in the first film, was played in a few scenes in Swordsman II.

== Reception ==
=== Critical reception ===
Brigitte Lin's performance was listed as one of the "Great Performances" by Richard Corliss under TIME magazine's "All-TIME 100 Movies". On review aggregator website Rotten Tomatoes, the film holds an approval rating of 71% based on 7 reviews, with an average rating of 6.79/10.

=== Box office ===
The film grossed HK$34,462,861 at the Hong Kong box office and remains Jet Li's highest-grossing film in Hong Kong to date.

=== Accolades ===
Award	Date of ceremony	Category	Recipient(s) and nominee(s)	Result
12th Hong Kong Film Awards	23 April 1993	Best Actress	Brigitte Lin	Nominated
12th Hong Kong Film Awards	23 April 1993	Best Film Editing	Marco Mak	Nominated
12th Hong Kong Film Awards	23 April 1993	Best Art Direction	James Leung, Chung Yee-fung	Nominated
12th Hong Kong Film Awards	23 April 1993	Best Costume Make Up Design	William Chang, Bruce Yu	Won
12th Hong Kong Film Awards	23 April 1993	Best Action Choreography	Tony Ching, Yuen Bun, Ma Yuk-sing, Cheung Yiu-sing	Nominated
12th Hong Kong Film Awards	23 April 1993	Best Original Film Score	Richard Yuen	Nominated
12th Hong Kong Film Awards	23 April 1993	Best Original Film Song	只記今朝笑—Swordsman II: Composer: James Wong; Lyricist: James Wong; Singer: Rosanne Lui	Nominated
