= Brigitte Lin =

Taiwanese actress (born 1954)

- 林青霞
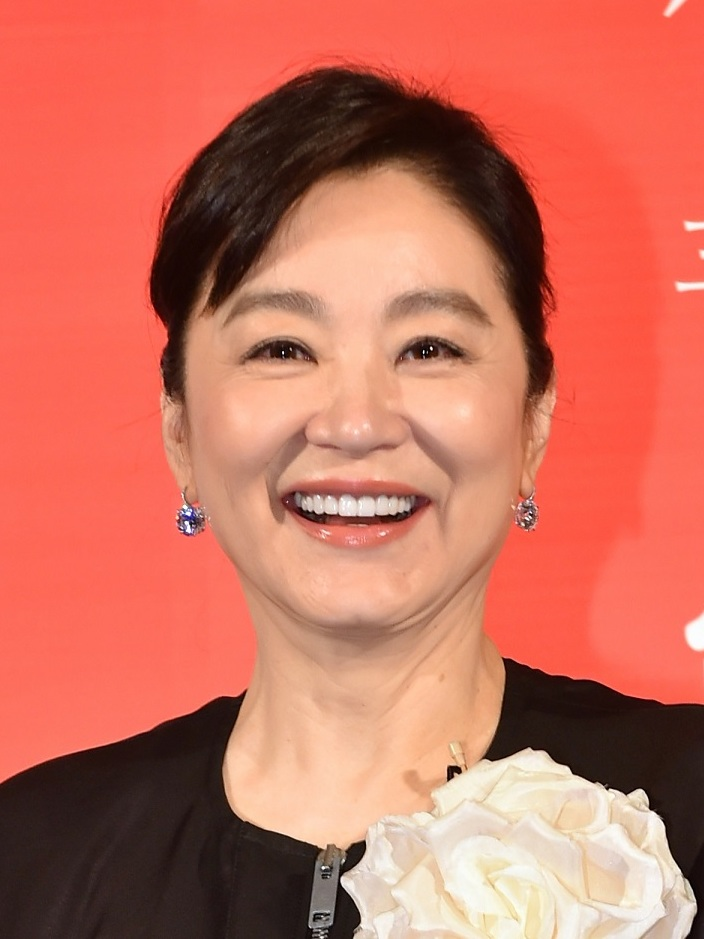
- Lin in 2018
- Born: Brigette Lin Ching-hsia; 3 November 1954 (age 71); Sanchong, Taipei County, Taiwan
- Occupation: Actress
- Years active: 1973–1994
- Spouse: Michael Ying (m. 1994)
- Children: 2

Chinese name
- Chinese: 林青霞
Transcriptions
Standard Mandarin
- Hanyu Pinyin: Lín Qīngxiá
Yue: Cantonese
- Jyutping: lam4 cing1 haa4

Brigitte Lin Ching-hsia (Chinese: 林青霞; pinyin: Lín Qīngxiá; born 3 November 1954) is a Taiwanese actress. Regarded as a screen icon, Lin played a key role in boosting Taiwan's film production with her romantic heroine roles in the 1970s before transitioning to Hong Kong, where she achieved great success with her androgynous roles in wuxia films. Following her marriage in 1994, she retired from acting and transitioned to writing in the 2000s, publishing four essay collections. In 2023, she received the Lifetime Achievement Award at the 60th Golden Horse Awards.

== Career ==
Lin was born in Chiayi, Taiwan to waishengren parents from eastern Shandong who had moved to Taiwan in the KMT exodus in 1949. She has a sister and a brother. She was scouted in 1972 on the streets of Taipei by a film producer after she finished women's high school and was preparing for university. Lin debuted in the film adaptation of Chiung Yao's Outside the Window (1973), which propelled her to stardom. Lin, along with Joan Lin, Charlie Chin and Chin Han, thus became known as the "Two Chins, Two Lins" (二秦二林) for their extensive roles in romantic movies of the 1970s based on Chiung Yao's novels that dominated the Taiwanese box office. She subsequently joined Chiung Yao's company in 1976.

She appeared in 55 films in the period between 1972 and 1979, and all her roles were romantic heroines in love stories, many based on Chiung Yao's stories. Lin won the Best Actress award at the Asia-Pacific Film Festival for her role as a girl scout in Eight Hundred Heroes (1976). She left for the U.S. in 1979 for a year and a half to study and relax.

Lin branched out of Taiwan with her collaborations with Hong Kong New Wave directors Ringo Lam, Tsui Hark and Jackie Chan in Zu Warriors from the Magic Mountain (1983), The Other Side of Gentleman (1984), Police Story (1985) and Peking Opera Blues (1986), establishing her as a screen icon. In 1990, she won the Best Actress at the 27th Golden Horse Awards for her depiction of a Chinese female writer who fell in love with a Japanese collaborator in Red Dust (1990).

Lin gained particular acclaim for her androgynous roles, which are common in Chinese operas and movies. Her earliest being Jia Baoyu, the male protagonist of the 1977 film adaptation of Dream of the Red Chamber. In Peking Opera Blues (1986), she was a guerrilla revolutionary and in Royal Tramp II (1992), she was the leader of the Heavenly Dragon Sect, while in Handsome Siblings (1992), she was a highly skilled successor of a martial arts leader, then in Fire Dragon (1994), she was a fire-wielding assassin. All four were female characters dressed as men. And in Ashes of Time (1994), she played twin brother/sister duo Yin and Yang. However, she is perhaps most well known for her role as cult leader Dongfang Bubai in Swordsman II (1992). Swordsman II marked the peak of her career in terms of box office earnings for which she was listed among the 10 greatest performances in cinema of all time by Time magazine. The success of the film brought her to other notable martial epics such as New Dragon Gate Inn (1992), where she again played a female character dressed as a man, and The Bride with White Hair (1993), until she retired from acting after Ashes of Time (1994). One of her final androgynous roles was The Three Swordsmen (1994), where she played a sect leading swordsman opposite Andy Lau. She made a small-screen comeback by joining the Hunan TV reality show Up Idol (2015).

She was conferred an honorary doctorate (Doctor of Social Sciences) from the University of Hong Kong on April 3, 2023.

== Personal life ==
Lin dated both Chin Han and Charlie Chin of the "Two Chins, Two Lins" fame in the 1970s.

Lin married Hong Kong businessman Michael Ying in 1994. She is the mother of Eileen Ying Oi Lum (born 1996) and Melani Ying Yin-oi (born 2001) and stepmother to Claudine Ying.

In 2002, Lin's 71-year-old mother, who struggled with depression, committed suicide by jumping off the 12th floor of her apartment.

== Filmography ==
=== Film ===
| Year | English title | Chinese title | Role | Notes |
|---|---|---|---|---|
| 1973 | Outside the Window | 窗外 | Jiang Yanrong | |
| 1974 | Gone with the Cloud | 雲飄飄 | Li Zhongjiang | |
| 1974 | Ghost of the Mirror | 古鏡幽魂 | Susu | |
| 1974 | Love, Love, Love | 純純的愛 | Lin Chunchun | |
| 1974 | The River of Cloudy | 雲河 | Liang Xinlan | |
| 1974 | Female Reporter | 女記者 | Shen Fuhui | |
| 1974 | Girlfriend | 女朋友 | Xia Xiaochan | |
| 1974 | The House of Love | 愛的小屋 | Xiao Yu | |
| 1974 | Green Green Meadow | 青青草原上 | Fang Menglan | |
| 1974 | Long Way from Home | 長情萬縷 | Lin Shanshan | |
| 1975 | Misty Drizzle | 煙雨 | Ji Chunxia | |
| 1975 | The Life God | 雲深不知處 | White-clothed girl | |
| 1975 | Xiao Yi Huai Chun | 小姨怀春 | Wan Qing | |
| 1975 | Run Lover Run | 愛情長跑 | Shui Liping | |
| 1975 | Hot Wave | 熱浪 | Xia Xiaoyu | |
| 1975 | The Unforgettable Character | 在水一方 | Tu Hsiao-shuang | |
| 1975 | He Loved Once Too Many | 水雲 | Shui Jiao | |
| 1975 | Love Story of Pian Pian | 翩翩情 | Pian Pian | |
| 1975 | The Forest of Forever | 長青樹 | Luo Yanan | |
| 1976 | Eight Hundred Heroes | 八百壯士 | Yang Huimin | |
| 1976 | Autumn Song | 秋歌 | Dong Zhiyun | |
| 1976 | The Chasing Game | 追球追求 | Fang Meihan | |
| 1976 | Tomorrow I'm 20 | 明天二十歲 | | |
| 1976 | Love Kungfu | 戀愛功夫 | Xia Xiaoyun | |
| 1976 | The Beauty with Two Faces | 海天一色 | | |
| 1976 | Love Forever | 海誓山盟 | Yi Lian | |
| 1976 | Today and Tomorrow | 昨夜，今夜，明夜 | | |
| 1976 | Forever My Love | 楓葉情 | Li Jinwen | |
| 1976 | Different Love | 不一樣的愛 | Song Xiaoyu | |
| 1976 | My Funny Intern | 鬼馬俏醫生 | Fang Jie | |
| 1977 | Come Fly With Me | 我是一沙鷗 | Liu Yanmei | |
| 1977 | The Cloud of Romance | 我是一片雲 | Tuan Wanlu | |
| 1977 | The Dream of the Red Chamber | 金玉良緣紅樓夢 | Jia Baoyu | |
| 1977 | There's No Place Like Home | 異鄉夢 | Ye Hualing | |
| 1977 | The Love Affair of Rainbow | 奔向彩虹 | Xiao Hong | |
| 1977 | My Sweet Love | 溫馨在我心 | Li Huifang | |
| 1977 | Orchid in the Rain | 幽蘭在雨中 | Qiu Meng | |
| 1978 | The Misty Moon | 月朦朧鳥朦朧 | Liu Lingshan | |
| 1978 | Love of the White Snake | 真白蛇傳 | Madam White Snake | |
| 1978 | Morning Fog | 晨雾 | Du Xiaowu | |
| 1978 | Moon on the Beach | 沙灘上的月亮 | Luo Xiaolu | |
| 1978 | A Journey of Love | 無情荒地有情天 | Yin Meizhen | |
| 1978 | Birds Are Singing Everywhere | 處處聞啼鳥 | Shen Yalun | |
| 1978 | The Story of Green House | 綠色山莊 | Fang Yizhu | |
| 1979 | The Wild Goose on the Wing | 雁兒在林梢 | Tao Lifan | |
| 1979 | Love Under a Rosy Sky | 彩霞满天 | Yin Tsai-Chin | |
| 1979 | A Love Seed | 一顆紅豆 | Xia Chulei | |
| 1979 | Cheng Gong Ling Shang | 成功嶺上 | | |
| 1979 | The Choice of Love | 一片深情 | Wen Jiayi | |
| 1979 | By Love Obsessed | 情奔 | Ruo Ping | |
| 1979 | An Unforgettable Day | 難忘的一天 | Tian Yuqiu | |
| 1980 | Magnificent 72 | 碧血黃花 | | |
| 1980 | Marigold | 金盞花 | Han Peiyin | |
| 1980 | Poor Chasers | 戀愛反斗星 | Shen Rong | |
| 1981 | Love Massacre | 愛殺 | Ivy | |
| 1981 | The Women Soldiers | 中國女兵 | Wen Jingyi | |
| 1982 | Golden Queen's Commando | 紅粉兵團 | Fang Huijun | |
| 1982 | Burn Phoenix Burn | 燃燒吧！火鳥 | Wei Yanran | |
| 1982 | Pink Force Commando | 紅粉遊俠 | Hu Fangling | |
| 1982 | Lily Under the Muzzle | 槍口下的小百合 | Xiao Han | |
| 1982 | The Deadly Angels | 脂粉奇兵 | | |
| 1982 | Hero vs Hero | 慧眼識英雄 | Shen Liangbai | |
| 1983 | Four Shy Guy | 四傻害羞 | Mo Hailun | |
| 1983 | Black and White Pearl | 黑白珠 | Guan Xuezhu | |
| 1983 | Zu Warriors from the Magic Mountain | 新蜀山劍俠傳 | Ice Queen | |
| 1983 | Fantasy Mission Force | 迷你特攻隊 | Lei Li | |
| 1983 | All the Wrong Spies | 我愛夜來香 | Ying Hong | |
| 1983 | 1983 Da Jing Qi | 1938大驚奇 | | |
| 1983 | Demon Fighter | 午夜蘭花 | Susu | |
| 1984 | Victims of the Assassin | 情人看刀 | Ling'er | |
| 1984 | The Other Side of Gentleman | 君子好逑 | Jojo | |
| 1985 | Seven Foxes | 七隻狐貍 | Miss Lin | |
| 1985 | Police Story | 警察故事 | Selina Fong | |
| 1986 | Dream Lovers | 夢中人 | Cheng Yuet-heung | |
| 1986 | Peking Opera Blues | 刀馬旦 | Tsao Wan | |
| 1986 | True Colours | 英雄正傳 | May | |
| 1987 | The Thirty Million Dollar Rush | 橫財三千萬 | Sister Maria | |
| 1987 | Flag of Honor | 旗正飄飄 | Qin Feng | |
| 1987 | Lady in Black | 奪命佳人 | Chan Mei-fung | |
| 1988 | Starry is the Night | 今夜星光燦爛 | To Cai-mei | |
| 1989 | Web of Deception | 驚魂記 | Jane Lin | |
| 1990 | Red Dust | 滾滾紅塵 | Shen Shaohua | |
| 1992 | Swordsman II | 笑傲江湖之東方不敗 | Dongfang Bubai | |
| 1992 | Royal Tramp | 鹿鼎記 | So Chuen | Cameo |
| 1992 | New Dragon Gate Inn | 新龍門客棧 | Yau Mo-yan | |
| 1992 | Secret Love for the Peach Blossom Spring | 暗戀桃花源 | Yun Zhifan | |
| 1992 | Royal Tramp II | 鹿鼎記II神龍教 | Long'er | |
| 1992 | Handsome Siblings | 絕代雙驕 | Hua Wuque | |
| 1993 | Swordsman III | 東方不敗之風雲再起 | Dongfang Bubai | |
| 1993 | The Eagle Shooting Heroes | 射鵰英雄傳之東成西就 | Third Princess | |
| 1993 | Boys Are Easy | 追男仔 | Ching Siu-tung | |
| 1993 | The Bride with White Hair | 白髮魔女傳 | Lian Nishang | |
| 1993 | The Black Panther Warriors | 黑豹天下 | Ching-ching | |
| 1993 | The Bride with White Hair 2 | 白髮魔女傳2 | Lian Nishang | |
| 1994 | Deadful Melody | 六指琴魔 | Huang Xuemei | |
| 1994 | Semi-Gods and Semi-Devils | 新天龍八部之天山童姥 | Lei Chau-shui / Lei Chong-hoi | |
| 1994 | Fire Dragon | 火雲傳奇 | Fire Dragon / Ying Ha | |
| 1994 | Chungking Express | 重慶森林 | Woman in blonde wig | |
| 1994 | The Three Swordsmen | 刀劍笑 | Ming-kim | |
| 1994 | Ashes of Time | 東邪西毒 | Murong Yang / Murong Yin / Dugu Qiubai | |
| 1998 | Bishonen | 美少年之戀 | Narrator | |
| 2001 | Peony Pavilion | 遊園驚夢 | Narrator | |

=== Television ===
| Year | English title | Chinese title | Role | Notes |
|---|---|---|---|---|
| 2015 | Up Idol | 偶像来了 | Herself | Reality show |

== Awards and nominations ==
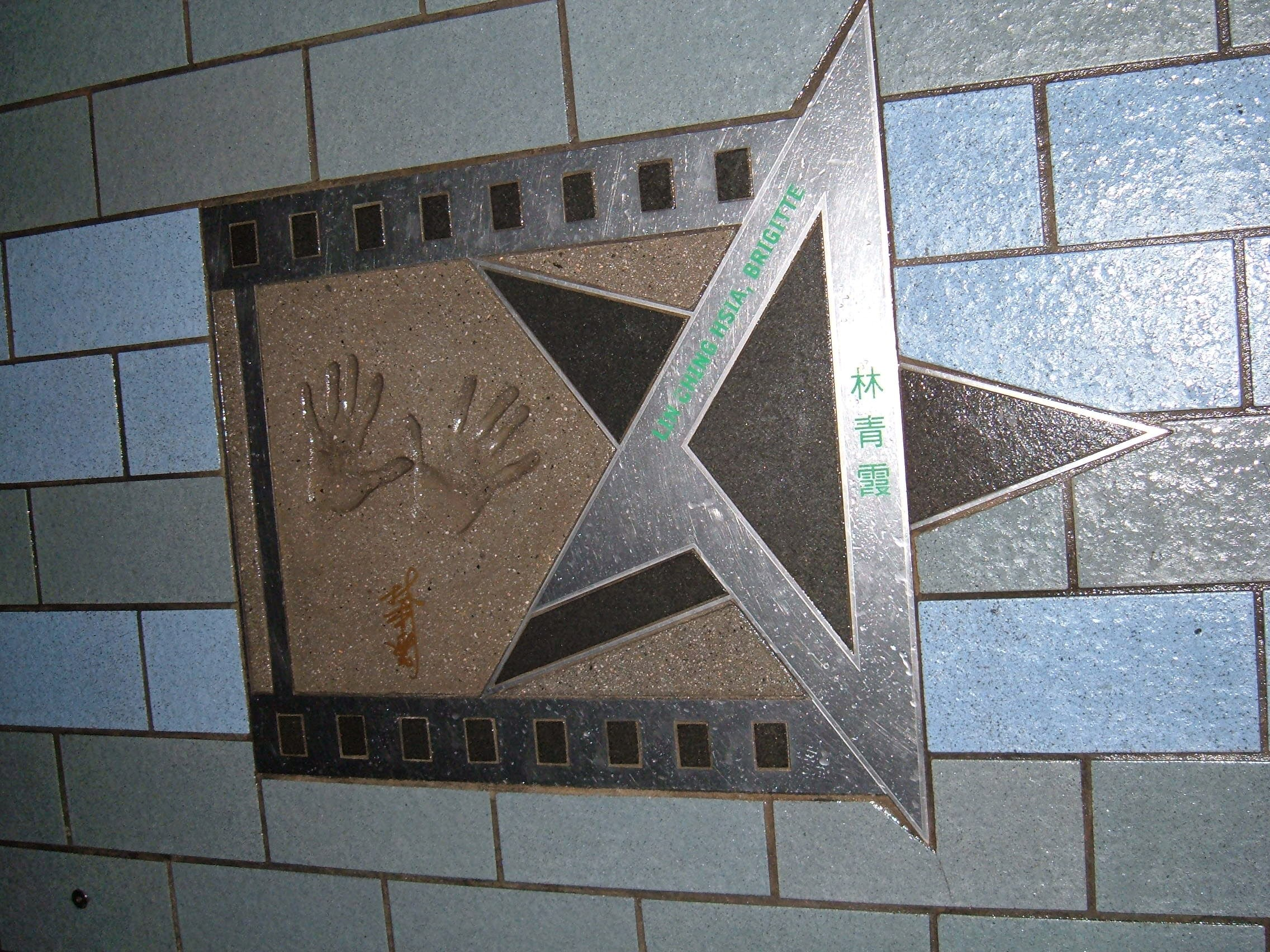
Lin's hand print and autograph at the Avenue of Stars in Hong Kong.

| Year | Award | Category | Nominated work | Result |
|---|---|---|---|---|
| 1975 | Asia-Pacific Film Festival | Best Actress | Eight Hundred Heroes | Won |
| 1980 | Golden Horse Awards | Best Actress | Magnificent 72 | Nominated |
| 1982 | Golden Horse Awards | Best Actress | Hero vs Hero | Nominated |
| 1984 | Hong Kong Film Award | Best Actress | Zu Warriors from the Magic Mountain | Nominated |
| 1986 | Hong Kong Film Award | Best Actress | Police Story | Nominated |
| 1990 | Golden Horse Awards | Best Actress | Red Dust | Won |
| 1993 | Hong Kong Film Award | Best Actress | Swordsman II | Nominated |
| 1993 | Hong Kong Film Award | Best Actress | Handsome Siblings | Nominated |
| 1993 | Golden Phoenix Awards | Outstanding Achievement Award | | Won |
| 2010 | Iron Elephant Film Award | Best Supporting Actress | Ashes of Time | Nominated |
| 2018 | Far East Film Festival | Golden Mulberry Lifetime Achievement Award | —N/a | Won |
| 2023 | Golden Horse Film Festival and Awards | Golden Horse Lifetime Achievement Award | —N/a | Won |

== Related publications ==
- The Last Star of the East: Brigitte Lin Ching Hsia and Her Films (2005)
- 窗裏窗外 Inside and Outside the Window (2011)
- 雲去雲來 Cloud Goes, Cloud Comes (2014)
- 镜前镜后 In Front of the Lens, Behind the Lens (2020)
- 青霞小品 Ching-hsia Sketches (2022)
