= Leslie Cheung discography =

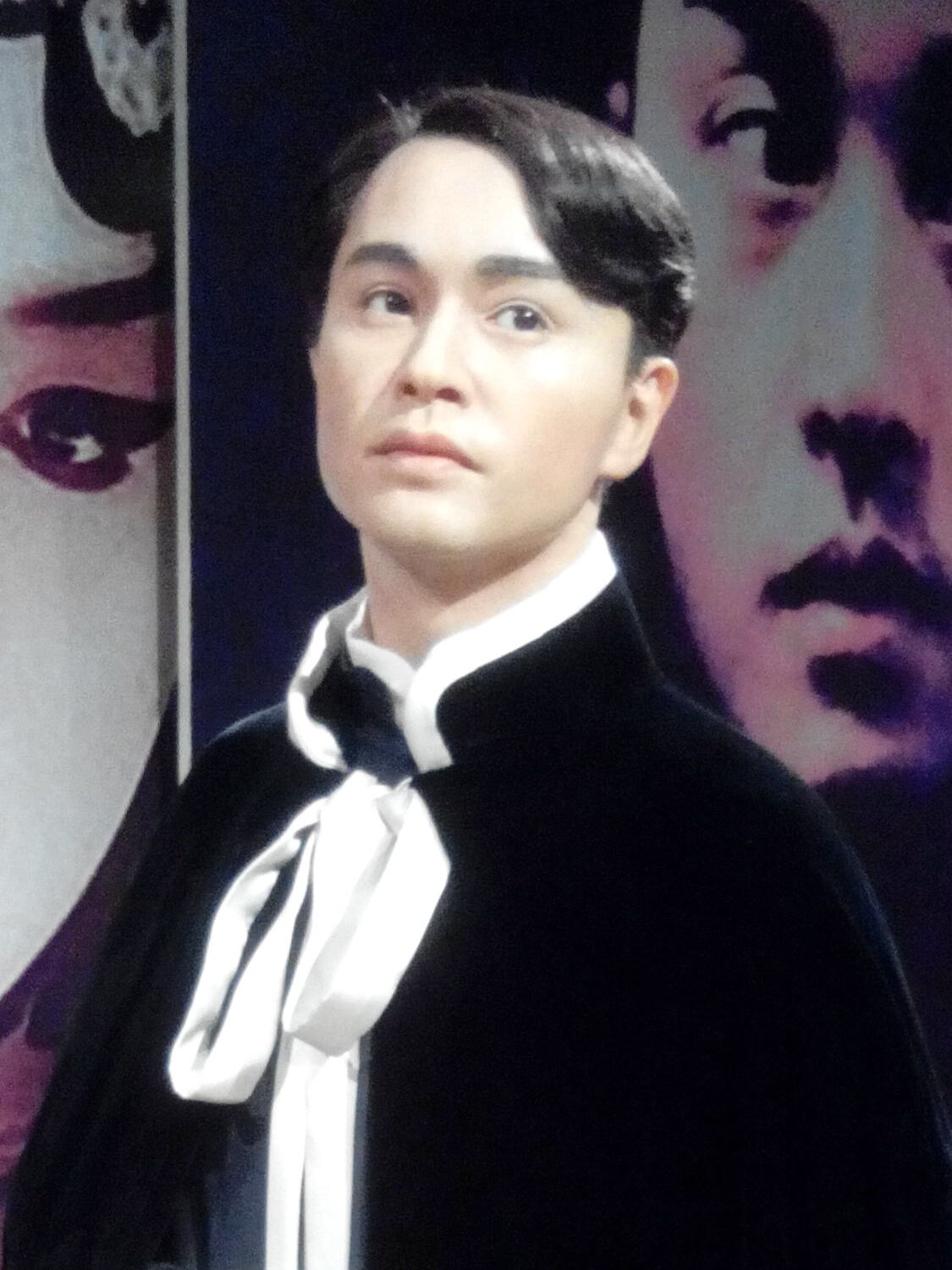
- Studio albums: 24
- Extended plays: 4
- Live albums: 4
- Compilation albums: 33
- Remix albums: 4

This is the discography of Hong Kong singer Leslie Cheung. His studio album, Most Beloved (1995), sold over 300,000 copies in Hong Kong and over 500,000 copies in South Korea, and remains the best-selling album by a Hong Kong singer in South Korea. In addition, Admiration (1987) sold over 300,000 copies in South Korea.

== Studio albums ==
=== Cantonese-language albums ===
Title	Album details	Sales	Certifications
Lover's Arrow (情人箭)	Released: 10 September 1979; Label: Polydor Records		
Wind Blows On (風繼續吹)	Released: 1 May 1983; Label: Capital Artists		IFPI HK: Gold
Craziness (一片痴)	Released: 25 October 1983; Label: Capital Artists		IFPI HK: Gold
Leslie (Monica)	Released: 15 July 1984; Label: Capital Artists	HK: 200,000	IFPI HK: Platinum
For Your Heart Only (為你鍾情)	Released: 14 May 1985; Label: Capital Artists		
Stand Up	Released: 12 April 1986; Label: Capital Artists		
Past Love (當年情)	Released: 1 October 1986; Label: Capital Artists		
Summer Romance	Released: 21 August 1987; Label: Cinepoly Records	HK: 350,000	IFPI HK: 7× Platinum
Virgin Snow	Released: 5 February 1988; Label: Cinepoly Records		IFPI HK: Gold
Hot Summer	Released: 29 July 1988; Label: Cinepoly Records		IFPI HK: Platinum
Leslie '89	Released: 22 February 1989; Label: Cinepoly Records		IFPI HK: Platinum
Salute	Released: 23 August 1989; Label: Cinepoly Records		IFPI HK: Platinum
Final Encounter	Released: 22 December 1989; Label: Cinepoly Records		IFPI HK: Platinum
Red (紅)	Released: 1 November 1996; Label: Rock Records	HK: 120,000	IFPI HK: Platinum
Countdown With You (陪你倒數)	Released: 13 October 1999; Label: Universal Music		
Big Heat (大熱)	Released: 1 July 2000; Label: Universal Music		
Everything Follows the Wind (一切隨風)	Released: 8 July 2003; Label: Universal Music		

=== Mandarin-language albums ===
Title	Album details	Sales	Certifications
A Better Tomorrow (英雄本色当年情)	Released: 26 November 1986; Label: Capital Artists, Rock Records		
Admiration (愛慕)	Released: 25 January 1987; Label: Capital Artists	KOR: 300,000	
Refuse to Play (拒絕再玩)	Released: 7 March 1988; Label: Capital Artists		
Riding Mood (兜風心情)	Released: 10 July 1989; Label: Cinepoly Records		
Most Beloved (寵愛)	Released: 7 July 1995; Label: Rock Records	Asia: 2,000,000; KOR: 500,000; HK: 330,000	IFPI HK: 6× Platinum
Printemps	Released: 21 April 1998; Label: Rock Records		

=== English-language albums ===
Title	Album details
Day Dreamin'	Released: January 1978; Label: Polydor Records

== Extended plays ==
Title	Album details
I Like Dreamin'	Released: 25 August 1977; Label: Polydor Records
Untitled	Released: April 1997; Label: Warner Music Hong Kong
All These Years (這些年來)	Released: 14 February 1998; Label: Rock Records
Crossover	Released: May 1999; Label: Warner Music Hong Kong

== Live albums ==
Title	Album details	Certifications
Leslie Cheung in Concert 88	Released: 1988; Label: Cinepoly Records	IFPI HK: Platinum
Final Encounter of The Legend	Released: 1990; Label: Cinepoly Records	
Leslie Cheung Live in Concert 97	Released: 1997; Label: Rock Records	
Leslie Cheung Passion Tour	Released: 2000; Label: Cinepoly Records	
Final Encounter of The Legend (2024 Remaster)	Released: 2024; Label: Cinepoly Records	
Leslie Cheung in Concert 88 (Live in Hong Kong / Full Version)	Released: 2024; Label: Cinepoly Records	

== Compilation albums ==
Year	Title	English Title	Label	Language
1985	全賴有你夏日精選	All Because You Summer Compilation	Capital Artists	Cantonese
1987	情難再續情歌集	Hard To Continue Romance Love Song Compilation	Capital Artists	Cantonese
1988	張國榮勁歌集	Fast Song Compilation	Capital Artists	Cantonese
1989	告別當年情珍藏版	Final Encounter Compilation	Capital Artists	Cantonese
1991	張國榮懷念經典	Leslie Cheung Classics	Cinepoly	Cantonese
1991	Final Collection	Final Collection	Cinepoly	Cantonese
1991	張國榮懷念經典	Memory Collection	Cinepoly	Cantonese
1992	張國榮經典金曲精選	Ultimate	Cinepoly	Cantonese
1992	張國榮浪漫	Leslie Cheung Romance	China Record Group	Cantonese
1992	張國榮英雄本色	Leslie Cheung A Better Tomorrow	China Record Group	Mandarin
1994	張國榮金蝶至尊精选	24K Gold Compilation	Cinepoly	Mandarin
1994	狂戀—國語經典	Crazy Love-Mandarin Classics	Cinepoly	Mandarin
1994	狂戀—粵語經典	Crazy Love-Cantonese Classics	Cinepoly	Cantonese
1995	常在心頭	Always In My Heart	Cinepoly	Cantonese
1995	張國榮Leslie 17首至尊精選	Leslie 17 Best Collections	Cinepoly	Cantonese
1996	所有	Everything	Cinepoly	Cantonese
1996	為你鍾情 (精選)	For You Only Compilation	Cinepoly	Cantonese
1997	哥哥的前半生	Leslie's First Half	Capital Artists	Cantonese
1998	光榮歲月	Days of Glory	Capital Artists	Cantonese
1999	精精精選	Finest Selections	Capital Artists	Cantonese
2000	永遠張國榮	Forever Leslie Cheung	Rock Records	Cantonese/Mandarin
2000	The Best of Leslie Cheung	The Best of Leslie Cheung	Rock Records	Cantonese/Mandarin
2001	哥哥情歌	Leslie's Love Songs	Capital Artists	Cantonese
2001	Dear Leslie	Dear Leslie	Capital Artists	Cantonese
2001	張國榮好精選 + Music Box	Leslie Cheung Classics + Music Box	Cinepoly	Cantonese
2002	愛上原味張國榮	Loving Original Leslie Cheung	Rock Records	Cantonese/Mandarin
2003	摯愛張國榮 (1995–2003)	Leslie Cheung Endless Love (1995-2003)	Rock Records	Cantonese/Mandarin
2004	History.His-Story	History.His-Story	Capital Artists	Cantonese
2009	最熱	The Hottest	Universal	Cantonese
2009	最紅	The Most Popular	Universal	Cantonese
2011	Leslie Four Seasons	Leslie Four Seasons	Universal	Cantonese
2013	Miss You Much Leslie	Miss You Much Compilation	Universal	Cantonese
2016	哥哥的歌	In the Memories of Leslie Cheung	Capital Artists	Cantonese
2020	REVISIT	Revisit	Universal	Cantonese, Mandarin
2023	Remembrance Leslie	Remembrance Leslie	Universal	Cantonese, English

== Remix albums ==
Year	Title	English Title	Label	Language
1987	Dance Remix '87	Dance Remix '87	Cinepoly	Cantonese
1988	Leslie Remix 行動	Leslie Remix Action	Cinepoly	Cantonese
1990	Leslie '90 New Mix plus Hits Collection	Leslie '90 New Mix plus Hits Collection	Cinepoly	Cantonese
1991	Miss You Mix	Miss You Mix	Cinepoly	Cantonese

== Limited releases ==
Year	Title	English Title	Label	Language	Notes
1989	To You	To You	Cinepoly	Cantonese/Mandarin	Korea-only album
1995	當真就好	Take it For Granted	Rock Records	Mandarin	Japan-only single
1996	有心人	A Man of Intention	Rock Records	Cantonese	Japan-only single
1997	Double Fantasy	Double Fantasy	Rock Records	Cantonese/Mandarin/English	Japan-only album
1998	Everybody	Everybody	Rock Records	Mandarin	Japan-only single
1998	Gift	Gift	Rock Records	Mandarin	Japan-only album
1999	The Best of Leslie Cheung	The Best of Leslie Cheung	Rock Records	Cantonese/Mandarin	Japan-only compilation
2000	大熱 + Untitled	Big Heat + Untitled	Universal	Cantonese	Japan-only album

== Compositions ==
=== Music ===
Year	Title	Remark
1988	"Miss You" (想你)	
1988	"Silence is Golden" (沉默是金)	A vocal duet by Samuel Hui and Cheung; Covered in Minnan under the title 海海人生 by Chen Ying-Git
1988	"Create Truth, Kindness and Beauty Together" (共創真善美)	Responds to a Hong Kong charitable event by government
1989	"Restart" (由零開始)	
1989	"When the Wind Comes Again" (風再起時)	Announces Cheung himself's retirement from music circle
1989	"One Night" (一晚)	A track by Connie Mak
1989	"Underneath the Sun Umbrella" (大陽傘下)	A track by Wong Yik (黃翊)
1989	"A Moth with Fire" (烈火燈蛾)	
1990	"Always Miss You" (永遠懷念你)	A track by Andy Hui
1992	"If You Understand My Suffering Difficulties" (如果你知我苦衷)	A track by Vivian Chow
1993	"Red Face, White Hair" (紅顏白髮)	A soundtrack for The Bride with White Hair, in which Cheung was the male protagonist 30th-Golden Horse Film Festival and Awards the Best Film Song
1993	"Lifetime Favourite" (一生最愛)	A track by Leon Lai
1993	"Forget You Just Like Forgetting Myself" (忘掉你像忘掉我)	A soundtrack for The Bride with White Hair 2 A track by Faye Wong
1994	"Surrender Declaration" (自首宣言)	A track by Julian Cheung
1995	"The Phantom Lover" (夜半歌聲)	A soundtrack for The Phantom Lover
1995	"Affectionate Embrace" (深情相擁)	A vocal duet by Winnie Hsin and Cheung himself
1995	"Lost You for a Lifetime" (一輩子失去了你)	A soundtrack for The Phantom Lover
1996	"Red" (紅)	
1996	"A Benevolent Person" (有心人)	A soundtrack for Who's the Woman, Who's the Man?
1996	"Long for More" (意猶未盡)	
1998	"From Now On" (以後)	
1999	"Harmful to be Alone" (寂寞有害)	
1999	"A Little Star" (小明星)	A soundtrack for The Kid
2000	"Me" (我)	
2000	"Great Fever" (大熱)	Awarded in 23rd-2000 RTHK Top 10 Gold Songs Awards, but Cheung gave up this honour
2000	"Treasure Myself Extremely" (極愛自己)	A debut single by Edison Chen
2001	"Noah's Ark" (挪亞方舟)	A theme song for CASH Golden Sail Music Awards by Composers and Authors Society of Hong Kong
2002	"So Far So Close" (這麼遠那麼近)	A track by Anthony Wong, and Cheung was the narrator in the song video
2003	"Red Butterfly" (紅蝴蝶)	
2003	"Dare Love" (敢愛)	
2003	"I See Your Kindness" (我知你好)	
2003	"Love of Glass" (玻璃之情)	

=== Lyrics ===
Year	Song name	Remark
1983	"Troubled By Love Oneself" (情自困)	
1983	"A Excerpt" (片段)	
1986	"Fire of Love" (愛火)	
1987	"Difficult to Manipulate Love Oneself" (情難自控)	
1989	"A Moth with Fire" (烈火燈蛾)	
1989	"To You"	An English song
1994	"Two Flying Swallows" (雙飛燕)	A vocal duet by James Wong and Cheung
1997	"A Man of Intention" (有心人)	
2000	"Owe Love to You" (欠了你的愛)	
