= Leslie Cheung filmography =

This is the filmography of Leslie Cheung, a Hong Kong film actor.

== Filmography ==
=== Film ===
Year	Title	Role	Notes
1978	Erotic Dream of the Red Chamber	Pao-Yu	
1978	Dog Bites Dog Bone	Beauty pageant guest	Cameo
1980	Encore	Gigo	
1981	On Trial	Rong Shao	
1982	Teenage Dreamers	Jackson	
1982	Energetic 21	Liang Wen Bin	
1982	Nomad	Louis	Nominated—Hong Kong Film Award for Best Actor
1983	The Drummer	Tommy	
1983	First Time	Ah Fung	
1983	Little Dragon Maiden	Yang Guo	
1984	Behind the Yellow Line	Paul Chan	
1984	Double Decker	Eddie	
1984	Merry Christmas	John	
1985	Intellectual Trio	Inspector Chan Wing	
1985	Crazy Romance	Wing Tsai	
1985	For Your Heart Only	Piggy Chan	
1986	Last Song in Paris	Louis	
1986	A Better Tomorrow	Sung Tse-kit	
1987	A Chinese Ghost Story	Ning Choi-san	Nominated—Hong Kong Film Award for Best Original Film Song
1987	A Better Tomorrow II	Sung Tse-kit	Nominated—Hong Kong Film Award for Best Actor
1988	Rouge	Chan Chen-pang	Nominated—Hong Kong Film Award for Best Actor
1988	Fatal Love	Chi Ken-wing	
1989	Aces Go Places 5: The Terracotta Hit	Ah Di	
1990	A Chinese Ghost Story Part II	Ning Choi-san	
1990	Days of Being Wild	Yuddy	Hong Kong Film Award for Best Actor; Nominated—Golden Horse Award for Best Actor
1991	Once a Thief	James	
1991	Party of a Wealthy Family	self-imagined version of Tsang Siu-chu	
1992	All's Well, Ends Well	Seung So	
1992	Arrest the Restless	Teddy	
1993	Farewell My Concubine	Cheng Dieyi	
1993	All's Well, Ends Well Too	David Copper Feel	
1993	The Eagle Shooting Heroes	Huang Yaoshi	
1993	The Bride with White Hair	Zhuo Yihang	Golden Horse Award for Best Original Film Song; Nominated—Hong Kong Film Award for Best Original Film Song
1993	The Bride with White Hair 2	Zhuo Yihang	
1994	It's a Wonderful Life	Roberto	
1994	He's a Woman, She's a Man	Koo Ka-ming	Hong Kong Film Award for Best Original Film Song; Nominated—Hong Kong Film Award for Best Actor
1994	Long and Winding Road	Lam Chiu-wing	
1994	Over the Rainbow Under the Skirt	Himself	Cameo
1994	Ashes of Time	Ouyang Feng	Hong Kong Film Critics Society Award for Best Actor
1995	The Chinese Feast	Chiu Kong-sun	
1995	The Phantom Lover	Song Danping	Nominated—Golden Horse Award for Best Original Film Song; Nominated—Hong Kong Film Award for Best Original Film Song
1996	Tristar	Chung Kwok-keung	
1996	Temptress Moon	Yu Zhongliang	Nominated—Golden Horse Award for Best Actor
1996	Shanghai Grand	Hui Man-keung	
1996	Who's the Man, Who's the Woman	Koo Ka-ming	Nominated—Hong Kong Film Award for Best Original Film Song
1996	Viva Erotica	Kwok Wing	Nominated—Hong Kong Film Award for Best Actor
1997	All's Well, Ends Well 1997	Himself	Cameo
1997	Happy Together	Ho Po-wing	Nominated—Hong Kong Film Award for Best Actor; Nominated—Golden Horse Award for Best Actor
1998	Ninth Happiness	Ma Lun-cheung	
1998	Anna Magdalena	Editor	Cameo
1998	A Time to Remember	Jin	
1999	Moonlight Express	Kar-bo / Tetsuya	
1999	The Kid	Wing	
2000	Double Tap	Rick Pang	Nominated—Golden Horse Award for Best Actor
2000	Okinawa Rendez-vous	Jimmy Tong	
2002	Inner Senses	Jim Law	Nominated—Hong Kong Film Award for Best Actor; Nominated—Golden Horse Award for Best Actor

==== Short film ====
Year	Title	Role	Notes
2000	From Ashes to Ashes	Lawrence	Also director and screenwriter

=== Television ===
Year	Title	Role
1980	Heritage: The Young Concubine	Jing Sheng

=== Documentary ===
Year	Title	Role
1996	Yang ± Yin: Gender in Chinese Cinema	Himself
