= List of best-selling albums in Hong Kong =

The following is a list of best-selling albums in Hong Kong. This list may include various types of albums, such as studio albums, live albums, extended plays, greatest hits, compilations, various artists, soundtracks, and remixes. To appear on the list, the sales figure must be published by a reliable source, and the album must have sold at least 100,000 units.

According to the International Federation of the Phonographic Industry (Hong Kong Group), The Private Eyes (半斤八両) by Sam Hui is the best-selling album of all time in Hong Kong, with over 500,000 copies sold. Paula Tsui is recognized by IFPI (Hong Kong Group) as the best-selling female recording artist of all time in Hong Kong, with at least three of her albums each exceeding 350,000 copies in sales. Other prominent Cantopop artists such as Alan Tam, Leslie Cheung, Anita Mui, and Jacky Cheung have each achieved average album sales of over 200,000 copies. Sammi Cheng has been awarded the IFPI Hong Kong Top Sales Music Award for Best Selling Female Artist nine times, and has received the award for Best Selling Album on four occasions. Mainland Chinese singer Faye Wong, who previously developed her career in Hong Kong, was listed by Guinness World Records as the "Best-selling artist of Canto-pop music (female)." However, this designation has been considered misleading, as her reported sales figures have not been certified by IFPI (Hong Kong Group). According to Guinness, the figures are based on estimations rather than certifications. Since Cantopop originated in Hong Kong, the Guinness listing may lead to the misconception that Wong is the Best-selling female artist in the Hong Kong region. Industry-standard sales certifications should be issued by recognized organizations such as IFPI, rather than Guinness World Records. Notably, Faye Wong has never received any IFPI Hong Kong awards for Best Selling Female Artist or Best Selling Album. According to IFPI (Hong Kong Group) records, only two of her albums have achieved platinum status in Hong Kong, which does not qualify as high-volume sales under IFPI's historical benchmarks.

Historically, the Hong Kong market has been dominated by local artists and music. However, the Cantonese music market is relatively small, and no Cantonese-language album has ever achieved sales of one million units within Hong Kong. Even when Cantonese songs gain overseas exposure, such popularity does not translate into significant album sales. As a result, no Cantonese album has surpassed one million copies sold across Asia. Any artist claiming that their Cantonese-language album has exceeded one million units sold in Asia is, therefore, making a demonstrably misleading statement.

Album sales in Hong Kong peaked between 1980 and 1992. However, beginning in 1993, the widespread emergence of pirated copies led to a year-on-year decline in sales. The situation worsened in 1999 with the rise of internet downloads, which further impacted the market.

== Certification levels ==
=== Local albums ===
Certification	1977 – 1979	1980 – 2005	2006 – 2007	Since 2008
Gold	15,000	25,000	20,000	15,000
Platinum	30,000	50,000	40,000	30,000

=== International albums ===
Certification	1977 – 1979	1980 – 2005	2006 – 2007	Since 2008
Gold	7,500	10,000	10,000	7,500
Platinum	15,000	20,000	20,000	15,000

== List of best-selling albums ==
Note: Some of the claimed sales figures taken from labels may seem inflated.Only certified sales within the Hong Kong region and officially claimed figures made within three years of an album's release are accepted. Sales figures from unreliable sources — including exaggerated claims, unverifiable cumulative totals, speculative estimates published by magazines, and fan-generated data — are excluded.

Year	Artist	Album	Sales	Origin
1976	Sam Hui	The Private Eyes (半斤八両)	500,000	Certified sales
1985	Anita Mui	Bad Girl (壞女孩)	400,000	Claimed sales Certified sales:50,000
1992	Jacky Cheung	True Love Expression(真情流露)	400,000	Claimed sales
1992	Jacky Cheung	Love Sparks (愛・火・花)	400,000	Claimed sales
1992	Andy Lau	Really My Style (真我的風采)	400,000	Claimed sales
1976	Paula Tsui	Prunus mume (梅花)	350,000	Certified sales
1976	Paula Tsui	G-Men '75 (猛龍特警隊)	350,000	Certified sales
1987	Leslie Cheung	Summer Romance	350,000	Claimed sales Certified sales:50,000
1988	Sally Yeh	Blessing You (祝福)	350,000	Claimed sales Certified sales:50,000
1995	Leslie Cheung	Most Beloved (寵愛)	330,000	Certified sales
1988	Alan Tam	Embrace (擁抱)	300,000	Claimed sales Certified sales:50,000
1989	Alan Tam	Love Of The Only Kind (愛念)	300,000	Claimed sales Certified sales:50,000
1989	Leslie Cheung	Leslie (側面)	300,000	Claimed sales Certified sales:50,000
1997	Jacky Cheung	A Legend That Never Ages (不老的傳說)	250,000	Certified sales（up to 1998） It sold 200,000 units in 1997
1989	Priscilla Chan	Forever Your Friend (永遠是你的朋友)	250,000	Claimed sales Certified sales:50,000
1975	Sam Hui	The Last Message (天才與白痴)	200,000	Certified sales
1985	Jacky Cheung	Smile	200,000	Claimed sales Certified sales:50,000
2003	Alan Tam & Hacken Lee (左麟右李)	Alan Tam & Hacken Lee Live Concert 2003 (左麟右李演唱會2003)	250,000	Certified sales
1988	Priscilla Chan	Autumn Colours (秋色)	200,000	Claimed sales Certified sales:50,000
1989	Adia Chan	Song Bird (天涯歌女)	200,000	Claimed sales Certified sales:50,000
1986	Prudence Liew	Prudence Liew (劉美君)	200,000	Claimed sales Certified sales:50,000
1987	Leslie Cheung	Monica	200,000	Claimed sales
1996	Sammi Cheng	Passion (濃情)	200,000	Certified sales IFPI HK: 2× Platinum (1997) IFPI HK: 2× Platinum (1998)
1997	Celine Dion	Let's Talk About Love	200,000	Claimed sales Certified sales（up to 1998）180,000
1997	James Horner	Titanic: Music from the Motion Picture	200,000	Certified sales（up to 1998）
2003	Sammi Cheng	Completely Yours...Sammi (完全擁有)	200,000	Certified sales
1994	Cass Phang	Unfinished Novel (未完的小說)	200,000	Claimed sales Certified sales: 180,000
1994	Wakin Chau	Music Brings Us Together (有弦相聚)	200,000	Claimed sales
1983	Paula Tsui	Paula Tsui: A Collection Of Love Songs	180,000	Claimed sales
1995	Sammi Cheng	Can't Let You Go (捨不得你)	175,000	Certified sales
1996	Sammi Cheng	Never Want to Give You Up (放不低)	175,000	Certified sales
1995	Wakin Chau	Music With You (弦途有你)	170,000	Certified sales
1995	Cass Phang	Awakening From A Dream (如夢初醒)	170,000	Certified sales
2001	Sammi Cheng	Shocking Pink	160,000	Certified sales
1974	Sam Hui	Games Gamblers Play (鬼馬雙星)	150,000	Certified sales
2009	Sammi Cheng	Faith	150,000	Certified sales
1980	Paula Tsui	Night Wind (夜風中)	150,000	Claimed sales Certified sales:50,000
1980	Frances Yip	Frances Yip (葉麗儀)	150,000	Claimed sales Certified sales:50,000
1988	Raidas	Legend (傳說)	150,000	Claimed sales Certified sales:50,000
1988	Priscilla Chan	Change, Change, Change (變, 變, 變)	150,000	Claimed sales Certified sales:50,000
1991	Beyond (band)	Hesitation (猶豫)	150,000	Claimed sales
2001	Joey Yung (a.ka. Joey Yung Cho-yee)	Love Joey (喜歡祖兒)	150,000	Certified sales
2001	Sammi Cheng	Sammi 903 Music Is Live 2001 (鄭秀文 - 903 拉闊演唱會2001)	150,000	Certified sales （up to 2002）
1995	Cass Phang	Outside The Window (窗外)	150,000	Certified sales （up to 1996）
1997	Mavis Hee	Listen Quietly(靜聽精彩13首)	150,000	Certified sales （up to 1998） It sold 100,000 units in 1997
1997	Aaron Kwok	Love Summonrs (愛的呼喚)	150,000	Claimed sales
1994	Aaron Kwok	The Wild City (狂野之城)	150,000	Claimed sales
1989	Hacken Lee	Purple Dream	150,000	Claimed sales Certified sales:50,000
1979	Sam Hui	79 Summer Song Collection (79夏日之歌集)	140,000	Claimed sales Certified sales:50,000
2000	Sammi Cheng	Love Is…	140,000	Certified sales
2002	Sammi Cheng	Shocking Colors Live 2001	130,000	Certified sales
2001	Sammi Cheng	Tender (溫柔)	130,000	Certified sales
2000	Sammi Cheng	Ladies First	130,000	Certified sales
1998	William So	Don't Want To Be Happy Alone (不想獨自快樂)	120,000	Claimed sales
1982	Anita Mui	Debut album	100,000	Claimed sales Certified sales:50,000
1987	Danny Chan	Dream Lover (夢裏人)	100,000	Claimed sales Certified sales:50,000
1988	Danny Chan	Danny Chan (陳百強)	100,000	Claimed sales Certified sales:50,000
1988	Ken Choi	Absolute Emptiness (絕對空虛)	100,000	Claimed sales Certified sales:50,000
1988	Priscilla Chan	Priscilla's Love (嫻情)	100,000	Claimed sales Certified sales:50,000
1988	Prudence Liew	Loving Prince (公子多情)	100,000	Claimed sales Certified sales:50,000
1989	Danny Chan	What more could I ask for in life (一生何求)	100,000	Claimed sales Certified sales:50,000
1989	Beyond (band)	Beyond IV	100,000	Claimed sales Certified sales:50,000
1989	Shirley Kwan	Happy Are Those in Love (難得有情人)	100,000	Claimed sales Certified sales:50,000
1993	Sammi Cheng	Sammi's Happy Maze (鄭秀文的快樂迷宮)	100,000	Certified sales
1995	Amanda Lee	Secret (秘密)	100,000	Certified sales
1996	Amanda Lee	Actually (其實)	100,000	Certified sales
1996	Edmond Leung	Breathe (呼吸)	100,000	Claimed sales
1997	Sammi Cheng	Language of Life (生活語言)	100,000	Certified sales
1997	Edmond Leung	Steal Kisses (偷吻)	100,000	Certified sales
1992	Veronica Yip	Irresistible Sensations (擋不住的風情）	100,000	Claimed sales
1984	Julie Su	Papa, Can You Hear Me Sing	100,000	Claimed sales
1982	Lam	Debut album	100,000	Claimed sales
1998	Sammi Cheng	Feel So Good	100,000	Certified sales
2001	Sammi Cheng	Complete (完整)	100,000	Certified sales
2001	Jay Chou	Fantasy	100,000	Certified sales
2000	Jay Chou	Jay	100,000	Certified sales
2001	Eason Chan	Shall We Dance? Shall We Tall!	100,000	Certified sales
2003	Hong Kong Various Artists	Love	100,000	Certified sales
1994	Vivian Lai	On The Sunshine Road (陽光路上)	100,000	Claimed sales
1993	Vivian Lai	Am I really in love? (我是不是真的戀愛了)	100,000	Claimed sales （up to 1994）It sold 50,000 units in 1993.
2000	Miriam Yeung	Play It Loud, Kiss Me Soft	100,000	Claimed sales
1984	Sam Hui	最喜歡你	100,000	Claimed sales
1992	Sam Hui	Sam Hui Golden Hits Collection, Vol. 1 (許冠傑之至尊金曲精選 Vol. 1)	100,000	Claimed sales
1992	Sam Hui	Sam Hui Golden Hits Collection, Vol. 2 (許冠傑之至尊金曲精選 Vol. 2)	100,000	Claimed sales

== Best-selling albums by year ==
=== 2000s ===
Year	Performing artist(s)	Nationality	Album	Sales	Notes	Ref.
2003	Alan Tam & Hacken Lee (左麟右李)	Hong Kong	Alan Tam & Hacken Lee Live Concert 2003 (左麟右李演唱會2003)	250,000		
2004	Anita Mui	Hong Kong	Anita Classic Moment Live	-		
2005	Jacky Cheung	Hong Kong	Live The Life (活出生命 Live 演唱會)	-		
2006	Eason Chan	Hong Kong	Get a Life Live	-		
2007	Sammi Cheng	Hong Kong	Sammi Cheng Show Mi 2007 Concert Live	-		
2008	Andy Lau	Hong Kong	Andy Lau Wonderful World Concert Tour Hong Kong 07 (劉德華Wonderful World香港演唱會07)	-		
2009	Leslie Cheung	Hong Kong	Most Popular (最紅)	-		

=== 2010s ===
Year	Performing artist(s)	Nationality	Album	Sales	Notes	Ref.
2010	Sammi Cheng	Hong Kong	Faith (信)	150,000		
2011	Joey Yung	Hong Kong	Joey & Joey	-		
2012	Andy Lau	Hong Kong	We + Andy Lau Cantonese Greatest Hits 2012 (我們的劉德華 Greatest Hits 2012)	-		
2013	Sita Chan	Hong Kong	All The Best	-		
2014	Sammi Cheng	Hong Kong	Love is Love (愛就是愛)	-		
2015	Sammi Cheng	Hong Kong	Miracle Best Collection	-		
2016	Leslie Cheung	Hong Kong	In Memories Of Leslie Cheung(哥哥的歌)	-		

== Best-selling music artist by year ==
Note: Data provided by the International Federation of the Phonographic Industry (Hong Kong Group).

=== Best-selling male artist ===
Year	Artist	Notes	Ref.
1992	Jacky Cheung		
1993	Jacky Cheung		
1994	Jacky Cheung		
1995	Jacky Cheung		
1996	Jacky Cheung		
1997	Jacky Cheung		
1998	Jacky Cheung		
1999	Andy Lau		
2000	Nicholas Tse		
2001	Leon Lai		
2002	Hacken Lee		
2003	Eason Chan		
2004	Alan Tam & Hacken Lee （左麟右李）		
2005	Leo Ku		
2006	Hacken Lee		
2007	Softhard		
2008	Andy Lau		
2009	Raymond Lam		
2010	Raymond Lam		
2011	Andy Lau		
2012	Andy Lau		
2013	Raymond Lam		
2014	Aaron Kwok		
2015	Hins Cheung		
2016	Raymond Lam		

=== Best-selling female artist ===
Year	Artist	Notes	Ref.
1994	Cass Phang		
1995	Cass Phang		
1996	Sammi Cheng		
1997	Sammi Cheng		
1998	Sammi Cheng		
1999	Sammi Cheng		
2000	Kelly Chen		
2001	Sammi Cheng		
2002	Sammi Cheng		
2003		No nomination in this category this year	
2004	Joey Yung		
2005	Joey Yung		
2006	Joey Yung		
2007	Sammi Cheng		
2008	Joey Yung		
2009	Janice Vidal		
2010	Sammi Cheng		
2011	Joey Yung		
2012	G.E.M.		
2013	Joey Yung		
2014	Joey Yung		
2015	Sammi Cheng		
2016	Joey Yung		
