= Okinawa Rendez-vous =

2000 Hong Kong film by Gordon Chan

Okinawa Rendezvous
- VCD cover of Okinawa Rendezvous
- Directed by: Gordon Chan
- Written by: Gordon Chan; Chan Hing-kai
- Produced by: Gordon Chan
- Starring: Leslie Cheung; Faye Wong; Tony Leung
- Cinematography: Cheng Siu-Keung; Wong Leun-cheung
- Edited by: Chan Ki-hop
- Music by: Adrian Chan
- Production companies: People's Production; One Hundred Years of Film
- Distributed by: China Star Entertainment Group
- Release date: 28 July 2000
- Running time: 99 minutes
- Country: Hong Kong
- Language: Cantonese
- Box office: HK$10,624,172

Okinawa Rendezvous (Chinese: 戀戰沖繩) is a 2000 Hong Kong romantic comedy film produced and directed by Gordon Chan, and starring Leslie Cheung, Faye Wong, Tony Leung Ka-fai and Gigi Lai.

While not one of Hong Kong's more significant films of the year, it was claimed by its director that it was filmed in less than 2 months without a script. It was shot entirely in the southern Japanese island of Okinawa and the film features many beautiful views of the island.

Its theme song was sung by Leslie Cheung entitled Without Love (没有爱) and is also found in his 2000 album, Big Heat (大热). Also, there were a few possible sub-themes like Faye Wong's New Tenant (新房客) which is as well available in her 2000 album, Fable (寓言).

== Plot ==
Jimmy Tong (Leslie Cheung) is an expert blackmailer and thief who specialises in white-collar crimes. With his side-kick (Vincent Kok), Jimmy steals a personal diary belonging to a yakuza leader, Ken Sato (Masaya Kato), intending to use its details as a platform for blackmailing and to extort money. Sato agreed to the uneasy deal and made preparations to pay Jimmy his exorbitant demands only for Sato's girlfriend, Jenny (Faye Wong) to betray him and make off with the money to Okinawa.

Elsewhere, Dat Lo (Tony Leung) was vacationing with his girlfriend (Gigi Lai) and another jilted girl (Stephanie Che) in Okinawa (intending to use the vacation to dump his own girlfriend), but stumbles into Jimmy whom he had little problems recognising as an international crook. From here onwards, Dat set aside his irrelevant plans to dump his companions and sought to devise a plan to entrap and to subsequently arrest Jimmy. Dat tried to convince Jimmy as an accomplice to a new bank heist of which Jimmy needed little persuasion. However, Jenny comes into the frame and before long, both Jimmy and Dat fell in love with her.

== Cast and roles ==
- Leslie Cheung as Jimmy Tong
- Faye Wong as Jenny
- Tony Leung Ka-fai as Dat Lo
- Gigi Lai as Sandy
- Vincent Kok as Sidekick Kuk Bo
- Masaya Kato as Ken Sato
- Stephanie Che as Cookie
- Asuka Higuchi as Lily
