= Final Encounter =

Final Encounter may refer to:

- For the Cause (film), also known as Final Encounter, a 2000 science-fiction fantasy film
- Final Encounter (album), a 1989 album by Leslie Cheung
