= Virgin Snow (disambiguation) =

Virgin Snow is a 2007 South Korean–Japanese film.

It may also refer to:

- Virgin Snow (album), 1988 Cantopop album by Leslie Cheung
- Virgin Snow, 1980s travel venture by Virgin Group
- "Virgin Snow", 1990 song by Japanese band Ribbon
- "Virgin Snow", 1997 song by Jordan Rudess from the album Secrets of the Muse
- Virgin snow is also a skiing term
