= Leslie '89 =

1989 cantopop album by Leslie Cheung

Leslie ‘89

Studio album by Leslie Cheung
- Released: 22 February 1989
- Genre: Cantopop
- Label: Cinepoly Records

Leslie Cheung chronology
Refuse to Play (1989)	Leslie ‘89 (1989)	Riding Mood (1989)

Leslie '89 is a cantopop album by Leslie Cheung released in 1989 by Cinepoly Records of Hong Kong. It was also his supposed penultimate album before the final album Final Encounter (he had planned for retirement from the Cantopop music scene, although he made a return in 1995) also released in 1989. It is also sometimes known as 側面 or Side Face.

Popular songs from this album include 由零開始 'Starting From Zero', 烈火燈蛾 'Fire Moths', 側面 'Side Face', 偏心 'Biased', 需要你 'Need You', and 放蕩 'Wild'. 'Side Face' won the Jade Solid Gold Award for 1989.

The cover design was by Alan Chan.
