= Most Beloved =

Studio album by Leslie Cheung
- Released: 7 July 1995
- Recorded: 1995
- Genre: Pop
- Language: Mandarin; Cantonese; English
- Label: Rock Records

Leslie Cheung chronology
Dreaming (1990)	Most Beloved (1995)	Red (1996)

Most Beloved or Beloved (Chinese: 寵愛) is an album by Leslie Cheung released in 1995 after a long personal struggle between deciding to make a comeback or to make good his retirement vow. It was also his first album with Rock Records.

It marked the milestone of another chapter of Leslie Cheung's career as it was his first album after supposedly retiring from the music world six years ago at the height of his career.

== Track listing ==
1. "A Thousand Dreams of You" – 3:31
2. 深情相擁 "Endless Embrace" (duet with Winnie Hsin) – 3:35
  Theme song from the film, The Phantom Lover
3. 夜半歌聲 "Midnight Singer" – 3:19
  Main theme song from the film, The Phantom Lover
4. 今生今世 "In This Lifetime" – 4:23
  Theme song from the film, He's a Woman, She's a Man
5. 當愛已成往事 "Bygone Love" – 5:02
  Ending theme song from the film, Farewell My Concubine; originally sung by Sandy Lam and Jonathan Lee
6. 一輩子失去了妳 "Losing You Forever" – 4:21
  Theme song from the film, The Phantom Lover
7. 追 "Chase" – 5:23
  Theme song from the film, He's a Woman, She's a Man
8. 眉來眼去 "Make Passes" – 4:04
  Theme song from the film, He's a Woman, She's a Man
9. 紅顏白髮 "The White-Haired Beauty" – 3:25
  Theme song from the film, The Bride with White Hair
10. 何去何從之阿飛正傳 "Choice" – 3:14
  Theme song from the film Days of Being Wild

== Charts ==
Chart (1995)	Peak position
Hong Kong Albums (IFPI)	1

== Sales and certifications ==
Region	Certification	Certified units/sales
Hong Kong (IFPI Hong Kong)	6× Platinum	330,000
South Korea	—	500,000
Summaries
Asia	—	2,000,000
