= Ruth Winona Tao =

American-born Chinese actress

Nonie Tao Eu
- Born: Seattle, Washington, U.S.
- Occupations: VJ; actress; producer
- Spouse: Douglas Eu
- Children: 3

Nonie Tao Eu, a.k.a. Nonie (SAG name) and Tao Kwun-Mei 陶君薇 (Cantonese name), is an American-born Chinese film actress, TV personality and MTV Asia and Channel V video jockey and producer in the early 1990s. She hosted Dial MTV, MTV Most Wanted, BY Demand and Asian Top 20.

== Biography ==
Tao graduated from the University of Washington majoring in political science and drama. In Taiwan, she starred in television series, hosted her own variety shows, and endorsed a number of commercials. In Hong Kong she starred in the films Evil Black Magic, Finale in Blood, A Touch of Class, and The Bride with White Hair 2. She guest-starred in the U.K. television series Soldier Soldier. In America, she guest-starred in the William Boyles Jr. television series Under Cover. Nonie was also featured on Good Morning America with Charles Gibson.

Tao was one of the first VJs for MTV Asia when it was launched on STAR TV in September 1991. Her shows were broadcast to 38 countries in Asia and Middle East - from Tokyo to Tehran, from Mongolia to Malaysia, and all of China and India before STAR TV split the beams into different languages and regions. Nonie continued to produce shows for all of their English and Chinese speaking channels. Her popularity saw her in demand for commercial endorsements including securing a six-figure deal with Pepsi and becoming the first international celebrity endorsement for Philippine clothing brand Bench.

After STAR TV replaced MTV Asia with Channel V in 1994, Tao joined the new channel as a co-producer and VJ, where she also hosted a radio show. As one of the early VJs in Asia, she developed a huge following in Taiwan, Singapore, Dubai, the Philippines, and India. In 1992, India Times proclaimed Nonie as "More famous than Princess Diana". She received hundreds of fan letters per day as a MTV Asia VJ.

== Personal life ==
Nonie Tao Eu is the granddaughter of Q.L. Dao, founder of Voh Kee & Co.

In the early-1990s, Nonie wed Jardine Fleming Finance fund director Douglas Eu in Maui, Hawaii.

In 1996, Nonie left her duties as host of Channel V's Asian Top-20 to have three children.
