= Red (Leslie Cheung album) =

Studio album by Leslie Cheung
- Released: November 26, 1996
- Recorded: 1996
- Genre: Cantopop
- Label: Rock Records
- Producer: Leslie Cheung; Alvin Leong

Leslie Cheung chronology
Most Beloved (1995)	Red (1996)	Printemps (1998)

Red is the fourteenth Cantonese-language studio album (twentieth overall) by Hong Kong singer Leslie Cheung. It was released by Rock Records on November 26, 1996.

The album received a platinum certification from the International Federation of the Phonographic Industry Hong Kong (IFPI HK) and sold approximately 120,000 copies in the territory.

== Background ==
The album was Cheung's second post-"retirement" album and incorporated multiple genres including smooth jazz, and trip hop, producing a distinct music style from Cheung's earlier albums.

The lyrics of all the songs were penned by lyricist, Albert Leung. Red is the only such album published by Cheung. The album also featured Cheung's first collaboration with C.Y. Kong.

== Track listing ==
1. "Prologue [Red]" – 0:12
2. 偷情 "Love by Stealth" – 4:56
3. 有心人 "A Man of Intention" – 5:11
4. 還有誰 "Who Else?" – 3:24
5. 談情說愛 "Whispers of Love" – 3:52
6. 你我之間 "You and Me" – 4:10
7. 怨男 "Grieving Man" – 3:40
8. 怪你過份美麗 "Blamefully Beautiful" – 4:55
9. 不想擁抱我的人 "The One Who Doesn't Want to Hold Me" – 3:51
10. 意猶未盡 "Longing For More" – 3:42
11. 紅 "Red" – 4:42
12. Boulevard of Broken Dreams" – 3:35 (Japan version)
13. Holding Deeply" – (Mainland China version)

== Credits and personnel ==
=== Musicians ===
- Leslie Cheung – vocals, background vocals
- Adrian Chan – background vocals, guitar
- Alex San – grand piano
- Melchior Sarreal – drum
- Miguel S. Ignot- saxophone
- Joey Tang – guitar
- Lam Chi Wang – bass
- Tulloch Sound Orchestra – Strings
- Albert – background vocals
- Nancy – background vocals
- Jacky – background vocals
- Isabella – background vocals
- Patrick Lui – background vocals
- May – background vocals

=== Production ===
- Producer: Leslie Cheung, Alvin Leong
- Recording/Mixing: Adrian Chan, John Lin, David Ling JR [Studio S&R], Geen, Randy [Tang Lou], Bryan Choy [Avon Studio]
- Programming: C.Y.Kong, Adrian Chan
- Music arranger: Alex San, C.Y. Kong
- Cover Design: Wing Shya of Double X Workshop
- Photography: Lawerce Ching
- Mastering Engineer: John Lin

== Charts ==
=== Weekly charts ===
Chart (1996)	Peak position
Hong Kong Albums (IFPI)	2

Chart (2022)	Peak position
Hong Kong Albums (HKRMA)	1

== Sales and certifications ==
Region	Certification	Certified units/sales
Hong Kong (IFPI Hong Kong)	Platinum	120,000
