= Days of Being Wild =

1990 Hong Kong film by Wong Kar-wai

- Hong Kong promotional poster

Chinese name
- Traditional Chinese: 阿飛正傳
- Simplified Chinese: 阿飞正传
- Literal meaning: True story of a hooligan
Transcriptions
Standard Mandarin
- Hanyu Pinyin: Āfēi Zhèngzhuàn
Yue: Cantonese
- Jyutping: aa3 fei1 zing3 zyun6
- Directed by: Wong Kar-Wai
- Written by: Wong Kar-Wai
- Produced by: Alan Tang
- Starring: Leslie Cheung; Andy Lau; Maggie Cheung; Carina Lau; Jacky Cheung; Tony Leung
- Cinematography: Christopher Doyle
- Edited by: Kai Kit-Wai; Patrick Tam
- Music by: Terry Chan; Leuribna-Lombardo Oflyne
- Distributed by: In-Gear Films
- Release date: 15 December 1990
- Running time: 94 minutes
- Country: Hong Kong
- Language: Cantonese
- Box office: US$146,310

Days of Being Wild is a 1990 Hong Kong drama film written and directed by Wong Kar-Wai. The film stars some of the best-known actors and actresses in Hong Kong, including Leslie Cheung, Andy Lau, Maggie Cheung, Carina Lau, Jacky Cheung and Tony Leung, and marks the first collaboration between Wong and cinematographer Christopher Doyle, with whom he has since made six more films.

It forms the first part of an informal trilogy, together with In the Mood for Love (2000) and 2046 (2004).

== Plot ==
In 1960 Hong Kong, Yuddy, a smooth-talking playboy, seduces South China AA box office attendant Li-zhen but is uninterested in a serious relationship, leaving her heartbroken. He moves on to a new relationship with vivacious cabaret dancer Mimi. Yuddy's friend Zeb is also attracted to Mimi, but it is not mutual. Yuddy has a tense relationship with his adoptive mother, Rebecca, a former prostitute, who has long refused to reveal his birth mother's identity.

Li-zhen finds solace in Tide, a policeman who does his rounds near Yuddy's apartment. Tide dreams of being a sailor but remains a policeman so that he can stay and look after his ailing mother. Li-zhen talks about her failed love affair, her successful cousin's impending marriage, and missing her home in Macau. She promises Tide a free ticket to a football match of his choice, and Tide tells her to call him on a phone booth he passes every night if she needs someone to talk to. After his mother dies, Tide leaves Hong Kong to become a sailor.

Rebecca eventually relents and tells Yuddy that his birth mother lives in the Philippines. Yuddy leaves to find her, giving his car to Zeb and without informing Mimi. A distraught Mimi resolves to follow him. Zeb, his love still unrequited, sells Yuddy's car to finance her trip and asks her to come back to him if she does not find Yuddy. Yuddy finds his mother's house but she refuses to see him.

Tide, on a stopover in the Philippines, finds a drunk Yuddy passed out on the street and brings him to his hotel room. Yuddy does not recognise him but accepts his assistance. He gets into a fight at the railway station over payment for a fake American passport and stabs a man. Tide saves him and they escape aboard a train. Tide asks him if he recalls what happened on 16 April 1960 at 3 p.m., which Yuddy asked Li-zhen to remember at the start of their courtship. Yuddy says that he does, but tells Tide it would be best to tell Li-zhen that he does not. Tide returns from a conversation with the train conductor to find Yuddy shot to death.

A final sequence shows Mimi arriving in the Philippines, Li-zhen closing up at the ticket stall and a phone at the booth ringing. The movie ends with a shot of a slick young man, smoking and readying himself in a darkened room. (Note: This is implied to be Chow Mo-wan, a character who later appears in In the Mood for Love (2000) and 2046 (2004).)

== Cast and roles ==
- Leslie Cheung as Yuddy (Chinese: 旭仔; Jyutping: Juk^{1}zai^{2}; pinyin: Xùzǎi), called York in one subtitled version
- Andy Lau as Tide (Chinese: 超仔; Jyutping: Ciu^{1}zai^{2}; pinyin: Chāozǎi), Policeman 6117, who becomes a friend and confidant of Su Li-zhen and later, after the death of his mother, he becomes a sailor and goes to the Philippines
- Maggie Cheung as Su Lizhen (traditional Chinese: 蘇麗珍; simplified Chinese: 苏丽珍; Jyutping: Sou^{1} Lai^{6}zan^{1}; pinyin: Sū Lìzhēn), who grew up in Macau and is the ex-girlfriend of Yuddy
- Carina Lau as Leung Fung-ying (traditional Chinese: 梁鳳英; simplified Chinese: 梁凤英; Jyutping: Loeng^{4} Fung^{6}jing^{1}; pinyin: Liáng Fèngyīng), Mimi/Lulu (Chinese: 咪咪; Jyutping: Mi^{1}mi^{1}; pinyin: Mīmī), the girlfriend of Yuddy
- Rebecca Pan as Rebecca, a former prostitute who raises Yuddy, has a love-and-hate relationship with Yuddy, because she refuses to reveal the identity of Yuddy's biological mother
- Jacky Cheung as Zeb (Chinese: 歪仔; Jyutping: Waai^{1}zai^{2}; pinyin: Wāizǎi), Yuddy's friend since childhood; Yuddy used to live above Zeb's family's garage as a kid; Zeb fancies Mimi/Lulu
- Danilo Antunes as Rebecca's lover, who only goes for her money
- Hung Mei-mei as the Amah
- Ling Ling-hung as Nurse
- Tita Muñoz as Yuddy's Mother
- Alicia Alonzo as Housekeeper
- Elena Lim So as Hotel Manager
- Maritoni Fernandez as Hotel Maid
- Angela Ponos as Prostitute
- Nonong Talbo as Train Conductor
- Tony Leung Chiu-wai as Gambler

== Music ==
- Los Indios Tabajaras, "Always in My Heart"
- Xavier Cugat, "Perfidia", "María Elena", "Jungle Drums", "My Shawl", "Siboney"
- Leslie Cheung performed the song 何去何從之阿飛正傳 loosely translated as 'Choice' or 'The True Story of Ah Fei' as the film's theme song and it is also found in his album Beloved (寵愛).
- 梅豔芳 (Anita Mui) – 是這樣的 – the Cantonese cover of the theme song and is featured at the end of the film during the credits.

== Release ==
The film debuted on the Blu-ray format for the first time in the United States in 2021 in a collection of 7 Wong Kar-wai films by the Criterion Collection.

== Reception ==
=== Box office ===
Days of Being Wild grossed HK$9,751,942 in its Hong Kong run, a number that became typical for Wong Kar Wai's films. With the starry cast, this figure was considered a disappointment. Still, the film was successful enough to warrant a parody (The Days of Being Dumb, which also featured Tony Leung and Jacky Cheung), and now routinely tops Hong Kong critics' lists of the best local productions.

=== Critical reception ===
On review aggregator Rotten Tomatoes, the film has an approval rating of 91% based on 32 reviews, with an average rating of 7.70/10. The website's critical consensus reads, "Days of Being Wild uses a young man's struggle to come to terms with a family secret as the foundation for a beautifully filmed drama with a darkly dreamy allure". On Metacritic, the film has a weighted average score of 93 out of 100 based on 21 critic reviews, indicating "universal acclaim".

The South Korean director and critic Park Chan-wook called Days of Being Wild "an enigmatic and trancelike fantasy" set in the early 1960s. He wrote that it is a metaphor for the return of the British colony of Hong Kong to China, which was planned for 1997. The return of Hong Kong caused deep fears, as many Hong Kongers feared that the relative liberties that existed under British rule would end under the rule of the People's Republic of China. Park noted that much of the film is set at night and that many scenes are dimly lit, creating a dark mood. Likewise, Park noted that much of the Days of Being Wild takes place in claustrophobic rooms and trains, which he saw as a metaphor for the characters' limited futures. He noted that all the characters look backward to the past rather than forward to the future. Yuddy is obsessed with finding his mother he never knew; Li-zhen is equally obsessed with remembering 3 pm 16 April 1960, the moment she met Yuddy; Tide cannot forget his short-lived quasi-romance with Li-zhen; Fung-ying can not give up her love for Yuddy; and Zeb holds on to his friendship with Yuddy despite the way he treats him. In a similar way, all the characters end the film on an unhappy note. Yuddy's mother rejects him and his trip to the Philippines leads to his murder; Fung-ying goes to the Philippines to find Yuddy, unaware of his death; Zeb is rejected by Fung-ying; and Tide and Li-zhen are unable to reconnect. Park argued that the way that the characters cannot look forward to a better future and are instead obsessed with the lost world of the past reflected the sense of despair at the heart of the film, suggesting that Hong Kong had its best days in the 1960s and has no bright future in its planned return to China.

The American critic Jonathan Rosenbaum wrote of Days of Being Wild: "Wong Kar-wai’s idiosyncratic style first became apparent in this gorgeously moody second feature (1990), whose romantic vision of 1960 Hong Kong as a network of unfulfilled longings would later echo through In the Mood for Love...As critic Tony Rayns has noted, it’s 'the first film to rhyme nostalgia for a half-imaginary past with future shock'". Rosenbaum noted that the similarity between Yuddy and the characters played by James Dean, and that when Dean's last film, Rebel Without a Cause (1955), was released in Hong Kong, its title in Cantonese was Days of Being Wild. Rosenbaum noted that the "puzzling coda" of an ending with an young man preparing going out was meant to be the start of a planned sequel, which was never made.

=== Accolades ===
The film ranked third on the Hong Kong Film Awards Association (HKFAA)'s 2005 list of The Best 100 Chinese Motion Pictures. It placed 37th on the "Asian Cinema 100 List" at the 20th Busan International Film Festival in 2015.

Ceremony	Year	Category	Recipient	Result	Ref.
37th Asia Pacific Film Festival	1992	Best Actor	Leslie Cheung	Nominated	
Golden Bauhinia Awards	1997	Best Hong Kong film of the last 10 years	—N/a	Won	
Golden Horse Awards	1991	Best Feature Film	—N/a	Nominated	
Golden Horse Awards	1991	Best Director	Wong Kar-wai	Won	
Golden Horse Awards	1991	Best Art Direction	William Chang	Won	
Golden Horse Awards	1991	Best Makeup and Costume Design	William Chang	Won	
Golden Horse Awards	1991	Best Editing	Patrick Tam and Kai Kit-wai	Won	
Golden Horse Awards	1991	Best Sound Recording	陳偉雄	Won	
Golden Horse Awards	1991	Best Leading Actor	Leslie Cheung	Nominated	
Golden Horse Awards	1991	Best Leading Actress	Carina Lau	Nominated	
Golden Horse Awards	1991	Best Supporting Actress	Rebecca Pan	Won	
Golden Horse Awards	2011	100 Greatest Chinese-Language Films	—N/a	4th	
Hong Kong Film Awards	1991	Best Film	—N/a	Won	
Hong Kong Film Awards	1991	Best Director	Wong Kar-Wai	Won	
Hong Kong Film Awards	1991	Best Screenplay	Wong Kar-wai	Nominated	
Hong Kong Film Awards	1991	Best Actor	Leslie Cheung	Won	
Hong Kong Film Awards	1991	Best Actress	Carina Lau	Nominated	
Hong Kong Film Awards	1991	Best Supporting Actress	Rebecca Pan	Nominated	
Hong Kong Film Awards	1991	Best Cinematography	Christopher Doyle	Won	
Hong Kong Film Awards	1991	Best Art Direction	William Chang	Won	
Hong Kong Film Awards	1991	Best Film Editing	Patrick Tam	Nominated	
Hong Kong Film Awards	2005	Best 100 Chinese Motion Pictures	—N/a	3rd	
Hong Kong Film Awards	2005	Top 100 Favorite movies of Chinese Cinema	—N/a	2nd	

== See also ==
- List of Hong Kong films
- List of movies set in Hong Kong
