= Inner Senses =

2002 Hong Kong film by Law Chi-leung

- Film poster
- Traditional Chinese: 異度空間
- Simplified Chinese: 异度空间
- Hanyu Pinyin: Yì Dù Kōng Jiān
- Jyutping: Ji6 Dou6 Hung1 Gaan1
- Directed by: Law Chi-leung
- Written by: Derek Yee; Law Chi-leung; Yeung Sin-ling
- Produced by: Derek Yee
- Starring: Leslie Cheung; Karena Lam; Maggie Poon; Waise Lee; Valerie Chow; Norman Chui; Samuel Lam
- Cinematography: Keung Kwok-man
- Edited by: Kwong Chi-leung
- Music by: Peter Kam
- Production company: Filmko Pictures
- Distributed by: Golden Harvest; Clyde Films Inc.
- Release date: 28 March 2002
- Running time: 100 minutes
- Country: Hong Kong SAR
- Language: Chinese
- Box office: HK$3,246,314

Inner Senses is a 2002 Hong Kong psychological horror film directed by Law Chi-leung and starring Leslie Cheung and Karena Lam. The film explores themes of hallucination, clinical depression, psychological trauma and suicide. It was also the last film Cheung acted in before his death in April 2003.

== Summary ==
Psychiatrist Dr. Jim Law tries to treat his patient, Cheung Yan, a woman who believes that she sees ghosts. Law does not believe in the supernatural and thinks that she is repressing her past. Law reads Yan's diaries to better understand her psyche and learns that her parents are divorced and do not care for her. Yan's condition improves gradually and they develop a romantic relationship at the same time.

However, Law feels that he cannot become too close to Yan because she is his patient and tries to convey the message to her indirectly. Yan understands his words and feels hurt, as she thinks that he is dumping her in the same way as her ex-boyfriend did. She starts having hallucinations again and sees the spirits of her landlord's deceased wife and son, after which she attempts suicide by overdosing on antidepressants and slitting her wrist, but survives. Law travels to Yan's apartment later and hears strange noises in the bathroom and thinks that her neighbour upstairs is responsible. Once, Law sees a female ghost while looking out of his window, and sees her again on another two occasions while driving and swimming. He starts taking antidepressants as well and tries to electrocute himself, but is rescued in time and recovers.

Law eventually helps Yan recover from her mental illness by reuniting her with her parents. Following that, he starts dating Yan as she is no longer his patient. While in a restaurant one day, Law is attacked by a woman, whom he remembers to be the mother of the ghost he saw. He starts having nightmares and begins sleepwalking, behaving erratically and reacting violently when Yan and his colleagues ask him. The ghost that Law sees is actually Siu-yu, his ex-girlfriend in high school, who committed suicide after Law broke up with her. Law has visions of Siu-yu following him wherever he goes and flees in horror until he finally reaches the top of a building. He is confronted by Siu-yu's ghost, who wants to force him to jump off. Law shows remorse for causing Siu-yu's death and the ghost disappears. After that, he sees Yan walking towards him and embraces her, and the film ends with both of them sitting together on the top of the building.

== Cast ==
- Leslie Cheung as Jim Law
  - Hugo Chim as young Jim Law
- Karena Lam as Cheung Yan
- Waise Lee as Wilson Chan
- Valerie Chow as Mrs Chan
- Norman Chui as Mr Chu
- Maggie Poon as Cheung Siu-yu
- Samuel Lam as Professor Fong
- Leung Tin as Hospital director
- So Hang-suen as Siu-yu's mother
- Wong Shu-tong as Siu-yu's father
- Lee Pui-shing as Mike
- Courtney Wu as Swimming pool custodian
- Olivia Wong as Jim's assistant
- Liu Hongdou as Yan's mother
- Sun Liwen as Yan's father
- Jova Yuen as Jim's friend
- Tony Wong as Bathroom ghost
- Ho Pui-san as Mike's girlfriend
- Stefan Kratz as Foreign student
- Helda Chan as Jim's classmate
- Wat Wai-kwok as Head nurse
- Josephine Choi as Jim's maid
- Lai Pui-yin as Chu's wife
- Lee Ting-fung as Chu's son
- Stanley Wong as Man living upstairs
- Zerisawa as Pool security

== Release ==
Inner Senses was released in Hong Kong on 28 March 2002. In the Philippines, the film was released on 24 September 2003, with the marketing exploiting the death of Leslie Cheung by stating it occurred under the same circumstances as what happened to his character Jim Law.

== Accolades ==
Awards and nominations
Ceremony	Category	Recipient	Outcome
22nd Hong Kong Film Awards	Best Director	Law Chi-leung	Nominated
22nd Hong Kong Film Awards	Best Actor	Leslie Cheung	Nominated
22nd Hong Kong Film Awards	Best Actress	Karena Lam	Nominated
22nd Hong Kong Film Awards	Best Sound Design	Kinson Tsang	Nominated
22nd Hong Kong Film Awards	Outstanding Young Director Award	Law Chi-leung	Won
39th Golden Horse Awards	Best Actor	Leslie Cheung	Nominated
9th Hong Kong Film Critics Society Awards	Film of Merit	Inner Senses	Nominated
2nd Ming Pao Awards	Most Outstanding Film Actor	Leslie Cheung	Won
