= The Bride with White Hair 2 =

1993 Hong Kong film by David Wu

- DVD cover art
- 白髮魔女2
- Directed by: David Wu
- Written by: Ronny Yu; David Wu; Raymond To
- Produced by: Ronny Yu; Clifton Ko
- Starring: Sunny Chan; Joey Meng; Christy Chung; Brigitte Lin; Leslie Cheung
- Cinematography: Joe Chan
- Edited by: David Wu
- Music by: Richard Yuen
- Production company: Ronny Yu Films
- Distributed by: Mandarin Films
- Release date: 22 December 1993
- Running time: 80 minutes
- Country: Hong Kong
- Language: Cantonese
- Box office: HK$9.8 million

The Bride with White Hair 2 (白髮魔女2) is a 1993 Hong Kong wuxia film directed by David Wu. It is the sequel to The Bride with White Hair, with Brigitte Lin and Leslie Cheung reprising their roles as Lian Nichang and Zhuo Yihang. Although the first film is loosely adapted from the novel Baifa Monü Zhuan by Liang Yusheng, this film is almost independent of the novel except for the main characters' names.

== Synopsis ==
Betrayed by her lover Zhuo Yihang in the previous film, Lian Nichang has since transformed into a vicious killer known as the "White-Haired Witch". She starts a cult which takes in women who were exploited by men; one of the members is Chen Yuanyuan. Lian Nichang vows to kill the surviving members of the eight major martial arts sects in the jianghu, having previously slain all their seniors.

Feng Junjie, heir to the Wudang Sect's leadership position, marries Yu Qin. On the wedding night, Lian Nichang kidnaps Yu Qin, leaving behind a trail of death and destruction. Feng Junjie survives the massacre and plans with the survivors to rescue his wife.

Meanwhile, Lian Nichang brainwashes Yu Qin through a series of rituals and makes her see her husband and the eight sects as her foes.

Feng Junjie and the survivors fight with Lian Nichang and her followers, but are no match for her. Left with no choice, Feng Junjie seeks out Zhuo Yihang, the only person who can stop Lian Nichang, and finds him on a snow-capped mountain. He initially refuses to help them, but shows up at a critical moment to stop her from killing Feng Junjie.

Lian Nichang uses her hair to pierce through Zhuo Yihang's body, critically wounding him, but her hatred towards him gradually subsides as he gives her the flower that can turn her hair dark again. Just then, Chen Yuanyuan stabs Lian Nichang for betraying their cult's principles, causing Lian to pull her hair out of Zhuo Yihang's body and kill Chen reflexively.

The film ends with the deaths of Zhuo Yihang and Lian Nichang, who finally reconcile and are laid to rest together. On the other hand, Feng Junjie is reunited with Yu Qin, who has recovered from her trance.

== Cast ==
- Brigitte Lin as Lian Nichang
- Leslie Cheung as Zhuo Yihang
- Christy Chung as Ling Yue'er
- Sunny Chan as Feng Junjie
- Joey Meng as Yu Qin
- Cheung Kwok-leung as Duan Qi
- Lily Chung as Xinghui
- Lee Heung-kam as Emei Granny
- Ruth Winona Tao as Chen Yuanyuan
- Eddy Ko as Wu Sangui
- Law Lan as school elder
- Yu Chun-fung as Lan Lang
- Richard Suen as Lühen
- Jacky Yeung as Yi Fengxing
- Wong Sun as school elder
