= He's a Woman, She's a Man =

1994 Hong Kong film by Peter Chan

- He's a Woman, She's a Man DVD cover
- Hanyu Pinyin: Jīn Zhī Yù Yè
- Jyutping: Gam1 Zi1 Juk6 Jip6
- Directed by: Peter Chan
- Screenplay by: James Yuen; Lee Chi-ngai; Ella Chan; Clarence Hui; Jojo Hui; Peter Chan; Yee Chung-Man; Leslie Cheung
- Story by: Clarence Hui; Peter Chan
- Produced by: Peter Chan
- Starring: Leslie Cheung; Anita Yuen; Carina Lau; Eric Tsang; Lawrence Cheng; Law Kar-ying
- Cinematography: Henry Chan
- Edited by: Chan Ki-hop
- Music by: Clarence Hui; Chiu Tsang-hei
- Production company: United Filmmakers Organisation
- Distributed by: Mandarin Films
- Release date: 23 July 1994
- Running time: 107 minutes
- Country: Hong Kong
- Language: Cantonese
- Box office: HK$29,131,628

He's a Woman, She's a Man is a 1994 Hong Kong romantic comedy film co-written and directed by Peter Chan and starring Leslie Cheung, Anita Yuen, Carina Lau, Eric Tsang and Jordan Chan. This film was the recipient of many awards at the 14th Hong Kong Film Awards, including Best Actress for Yuen and Best Original Song for "Chase" by Cheung. The film was followed by a sequel, Who's the Woman, Who's the Man?, which was released in 1996. The theme song "Chase" (追) appeared on Cheung's 1995 album Most Beloved.

== Plot ==
Wing (Anita Yuen) is a sassy girl who deeply idolizes Rose (Carina Lau), a pop singer, and Rose's boyfriend, top record producer and songwriter Sam (Leslie Cheung). Rose has been groomed by Sam, achieving stardom and international acclaim. With her success, Sam decides to try his hand at bringing up a male singer. He decides to announce a country-wide, males-only talent search, much to his former protégée's chagrin.

Wing, desperate to meet her idols, seizes this opportunity and enters the contest disguised as a male. Her childhood friend (Jordan Chan) trains her to perfect this whimsical idea.

As fate would have it, Wing succeeds in the audition thanks to the poor quality of those auditioning and in part to Rose's taunts. Rose challenges Sam to see to the idea of him bringing up a (relatively) talentless Wing.

Wing is later invited to stay at Sam and Rose's home for her musical education. Wing tries unsuccessfully to reconcile the two lovers' difference. Trouble and comedy ensue as she finds herself falling for Sam and vice versa, despite his mistaken belief that she is a man.

== Cast ==
- Leslie Cheung as Sam Koo Ka-ming
- Carina Lau as Rose
- Anita Yuen as Lam Chi-wing
- Eric Tsang as Auntie
- Lawrence Cheng as Charles Chow Chu
- Law Kar-ying as Joseph
- Jordan Chan as Yu Lo
- Jerry Lamb as George
- Cheung Suet-ling as Alice
- Clarence Hui as Wing's vocal instructor
- Nelson Cheung as Face at party (cameo)
- Patrick Tsui as Paul
- Joe Cheung as Peter
- Mantic Yiu as Peter's wife
- Jacob Cheung as MTV Director
- Lee Ho-lam as Roger
- Ng Chin-yan as Busty Lin
- Matthew Tang as Building security guard
- Chan Wai-lung as Wing's dance instructor
- Chen Yong-liang as Audition judge
- Liu Fung-pinh as Audition judge
- Irene as Audition judge
- May Lam as Rose's mahjong friend
- Julian as Rose's mahjong friend
- Leung Yiu-hei as Audition contestant #1
- Yu Tin-lok as Audition contestant #2
- Tsang Ho-yin as Audition contestant #3
- Yu Dai-keung as Audition contestant #4
- Fung Ka-leung as Audition contestant #5
- Tse Pak-chuen as Audition contestant #6
- Ng Ming-wai as Audition contestant #7
- Lai Wing-yan as Audition contestant #8
- Osman Hung as Audition contestant #9
- Chu Ka-yiu as Audition contestant #10
- Tang Chi-sam as Audition contestant #11
- Jason Lee Jones as Audition contestant #12
- Jimmy Lee as Audition contestant #13
- Chan Chi-ban as Old band member
- Wong Sek-ning as Old band member
- Winston Yeh as Old band member
- Hui Sek-hung as Old band member
- Cipriano Antonio as Old band member
- Pete Spurrier as Wine bar patron (uncredited)

== Critical reception ==
For Asian Movie Pulse, Dawna Fung writes, "Despite being a comedy, the film actually touches on the daring question of homosexuality, a topic that was still taboo in 1990s Hong Kong. ... Sam does not actually have a crush on a boy, but instead on a girl who is pretending to be a boy."

== Awards and nominations ==
Awards and nominations
Ceremony	Category	Recipient	Outcome
14th Hong Kong Film Awards	Best Film	He's a Woman, She's a Man	Nominated
14th Hong Kong Film Awards	Best Director	Peter Chan	Nominated
14th Hong Kong Film Awards	Best Screenplay	James Yuen	Nominated
14th Hong Kong Film Awards	Best Actor	Leslie Cheung	Nominated
14th Hong Kong Film Awards	Best Actress	Anita Yuen	Won
14th Hong Kong Film Awards	Best Supporting Actor	Jordan Chan	Nominated
14th Hong Kong Film Awards	Best New Performer	Jordan Chan	Nominated
14th Hong Kong Film Awards	Best Art Direction	Chung Man-kei	Nominated
14th Hong Kong Film Awards	Best Costume & Make Up Design	Dora Ng	Nominated
14th Hong Kong Film Awards	Best Original Film Score	Clarence Hui, Chiu Tsang-hei	Nominated
14th Hong Kong Film Awards	Best Original Film Song	Song: "Chase" (追); Composer: Dick Lee; Lyricist: Lin Xi; Singer: Leslie Cheung	Won
31st Golden Horse Film Awards	Best Original Film Song	Song: "Chase" (追); Composer: Dick Lee; Lyricist: Lin Xi; Singer: Leslie Cheung	Nominated

== See also ==
- Cross-dressing in film and television
