= Summer Romance =

Studio album by Leslie Cheung
- Released: 21 August 1987
- Recorded: 1987
- Genre: Cantopop
- Label: Cinepoly
- Producer: Leslie Cheung; Patrick Yeung; Gary Tong

Leslie Cheung chronology
Admiration (1987)	Summer Romance (1987)	Virgin Snow (1988)

Summer Romance is the eighth Cantonese-language studio album by Hong Kong singer Leslie Cheung. It was released by Cinepoly Records on 21 August 1987. It was an album that further boosted the singer's huge popularity and celebrity power.

It was awarded Best Selling Album in the Jade Solid Gold 1987 in Hong Kong. It sold around 350,000 copies in Hong Kong, making it the fourth best-selling album of all time in the territory.

== Songs ==
Its popular songs include "Don't Wanna Play Anymore" (拒絕再玩), "Sleepless Night" (無心睡眠) which won the Jade Solid Gold Award for Best Song in 1987, "Enduring Together" (共同渡過), "Enough" (夠了), and "A Chinese Ghost Story" (倩女幽魂) which is the main theme for the blockbuster film starring Leslie Cheung and Joey Wong.

== Track listing ==
1. "Don't Wanna Play Anymore" (拒絕再玩) – 3:35
2. "Sleepless Night" (無心睡眠) – 3:08
3. "Where Are You?" (你在何地) – 4:57
4. "Invisible Lock" (無形鎖扣) – 4:18
5. "Ecstasy" (妄想) – 4:02
6. "Enduring Together" (共同渡過) – 4:23
7. "Difficult Sentimentality" (情難自控) – 4:13
8. "Enough" (夠了) – 3:53
9. "Please Don't Misunderstand" (請勿越軌) – 3:30
10. "A Chinese Ghost Story" (倩女幽魂) – 3:32

== Credits and personnel ==
Musicians

- Leslie Cheung: Solo and background vocals
- Johnny Boy, Ricky Chu: Drums
- Eddie Sing, Tony Kiang: Bass
- Anthony Sun, Hidetoshi Yamada: Keyboard
- Fujimori Yoshino, Tommy Ho: Guitar
- Ric Halstead, Jake Concepcion: saxophone

Production

- Producer: Leslie Cheung, Patrick Yeung, Gary Tong
- Recording/Mixing: Owen Kwan, Bryan Choi
- Cover Design and Art: Alan Chan
- Photography: Nobuharu Kondo
- Music arranger: Ken Takada
- Synthesizer Operator: Keiji Toriyama
- Engineer: Shigeki Fujino
- Co-ordinator: Tony Tang

== Sales and certifications ==
Region	Certification	Certified units/sales
Hong Kong (IFPI Hong Kong)	7× Platinum	350,000
