= The Bride with White Hair =

1993 Hong Kong film by Ronny Yu

- Film poster
- 白髮魔女傳
- Directed by: Ronny Yu
- Screenplay by: David Wu; Jason Lam; Tang Bik-yin; Ronny Yu
- Based on: Baifa Monü Zhuan by Liang Yusheng
- Produced by: Ronny Yu; Clifton Ko
- Starring: Brigitte Lin; Leslie Cheung; Francis Ng; Yammie Lam
- Cinematography: Peter Pau
- Edited by: David Wu
- Music by: Richard Yuen
- Production company: Mandarin Film
- Release date: 26 August 1993 (Hong Kong)
- Running time: 92 minutes
- Country: Hong Kong
- Language: Cantonese
- Box office: HK$20 million

The Bride with White Hair (白髮魔女傳) is a 1993 Hong Kong wuxia film directed by Ronny Yu. The film's main character, Lian Nichang, is based on the protagonist of Liang Yusheng's novel Baifa Monü Zhuan. In the film, Leslie Cheung plays Zhuo Yihang, an undisciplined member of the Wudang clan, who falls in love with Brigitte Lin's character Lian Nichang. Its discovered that Nichang was raised by wolves and then taken in by an evil cult. Despite this the two fall in love and vow to never leave each other, which leads to problems after their respective sects are both against such a pairing.

The film was shot in two months and released in August, and was followed by a sequel, The Bride with White Hair 2, directed by the original films editor David Wu. It was released later in the same year. The film was nominated for several awards at the annual Golden Horse and Hong Kong Film Awards.

== Synopsis ==
Zhuo Yihang, a chivalrous swordsman of the Wudang Sect, leads a coalition force formed by the eight major martial arts sects in the jianghu to destroy an evil martial arts cult.

During a confrontation with the cult, Zhuo Yihang meets a young swordswoman, Lian Nichang, and falls in love with her. She is an orphan initially raised by wolves before being adopted by Ji Wushuang, the conjoined twins who lead the cult. After consummating their romance, Lian Nichang decides to leave the cult and follow Zhuo Yihang in pursuit of an ordinary life away from the jianghu.

Lian Nichang leaves the cult after suffering great pains. Meanwhile, Zhuo Yihang returns to the Wudang Sect and sees that his fellow Wudang members have been killed. The coalition believes that Lian Nichang is responsible so they attack her when she arrives to meet Zhuo Yihang. Zhuo Yihang is forced to turn against Lian Nichang.

Devastated by her lover's betrayal, Lian Nichang transforms into a vicious white-haired killer and slays all the coalition members present. Suddenly, Ji Wushuang appears and reveals that they are the ones who killed the Wudang members. Zhuo Yihang and Lian Nichang join forces to defeat and kill Ji Wushuang. However, even after the victory, Lian Nichang vows never to forgive Zhuo Yihang for betraying her and walks away while he looks on helplessly.

In a brief epilogue set years later, Zhuo Yihang is alone in a remote mountainous region guarding a rare flower that is said to bloom only once every several decades and has the ability to turn white hair back to dark. Believing that it can cure the harm he has inflicted on Lian Nichang, he waits silently in the hope of reconciling with her.

== Cast ==
- Brigitte Lin as Lian Nichang
- Leslie Cheung as Zhuo Yihang
  - Leila Tong as Zhuo Yihang (child)
- Francis Ng as Ji Wushuang (male)
- Elaine Lui as Ji Wushuang (female)
- Yammie Lam as He Lühua
- Joseph Cheng as Yu Xincheng
- Eddy Ko as Wu Sangui
- Law Lok-lam as Taoist Baiyun
- Pau Fung as Taoist Ziyang
- Jeffrey Lau as school elder

== Production ==
Ronny Yu was described as being "virtually unknown" outside of Hong Kong until the release of The Bride With White Hair. Among the crew, Yu hired cinematographer Peter Pau and Japanese costume designer Emi Wada, who had previously won an Oscar for her costume work on Akira Kurosawa's Ran (1985). Yu commented getting both these people difficult as investors "couldn't understand why we should put so much money to hire these people. I must add that they were worth every penny." Yu described their costumes as a combination of Eastern and Western influences. Yu has rarely contributed to his own screenplays, but co-wrote the film with David Wu, Jason Lam Kee-To and Bik-Yin Tang.

The film was shot in two months. Yu stated the film was shot "in a rush, because I was obliged to release it in mid-August". For shooting his fantasy films in Hong Kong, cinematographer Peter Pau would apply a techniques that involved elaborate and richly colored lighting. Pau explained that this involved a use of hard light often with extreme blacks and pure whites mixed with deep reds and blues with lots of fog, smoke and filter effects. One effect used for the sword fighting scenes involved Pau using softer sources of light to create dramatic reflections by hitting the angle of the source and reflect into a lens.

Two bombs that were planted by the triads went off near the location of the production while Brigitte Lin was on set. Lin recalled a loud explosion, and that nobody knew what it was until after filming. The involvement with triads and Hong Kong filmmaking first led Lin to hire a female personal driver for transportation between shooting days.

== Release ==
The Bride with White Hair was released in August 26, 1993 in Hong Kong. The film grossed a total of $ HK20 million in Hong Kong. Comparatively, the film was not among the top ten highest-grossing films in Hong Kong in 1993. The highest was Jurassic Park (1993), earning $HK 61.99 million, while the tenth highest-grossing film was Fight Back to School III, which earned $HK 25.77 million.

Rim Film Distributors held their second annual Festival Hong Kong in Los Angeles, which included a screening of The Bride with White Hair on December 19, 1993. The Bride With White Hair had a limited theatrical release in February 1994 in the United States. It was released to home video in the United States in the third quarter of 1996 with English subtitles. Both the original film and its sequel were released in 1998 the United States on DVD. In the United Kingdom, VHS editions came out in 2000, followed by DVDs in 2001.

== Reception ==
John Evan Frook of Variety said that The Bride With White Hair received favorable reviews followings its limited theatrical release. Terry Lawson writing for Dayton Daily News gave the film a three out of four star rating, praising the film stating that "Fantasy movies are rarely as truly fantastic as The Bride with White Hair" and that it contained "incredible derring-do and stunts" as well as being "elaborately choreographed and photographed with both passion and precision". Lawson also praised the acting of Leslie Cheung and Brigitte Lin. Kevin Thomas praised the film as "period martial arts fantasy at its most romantic" that is "genuinely poignant as well as with and amusing", concluding that the film "is fun, lively, yet exquisitely tender, suffused, finally with a sweet sadness". The film was listed among an unranked Top 10 films of the year by Matt Zoller Seitz of the Dallas Observer. Derek Elley of Variety proclaimed the film "cuts a classy swath" in "the crowded market of Hong Kong costume actioners" noting that it "has a broad-spanned, darkly tragic atmosphere that sets it apart from regular, effects-heavy fare". Steve Biodrowski of the film magazine Imagi-Movies placed the film as the second best film of 1995, declaring it "the best fantasy to emerge from Hong Kong since Tsui Hark launched the current wave" and that it was "visually elaborates every nuance for maximum emotional impact".

From retrospective reviews, Rob Mackie of The Guardian reviewed the film on its home video release in the United Kingdom in 2001, praising the film as "sumptuous and completely berserk" with "lighting, colours and costumes put you in sensual overload" as well as being "quite sexy in places, as well as showing occasional evidence of a sense of humor-often the missing link in Asian melodrama". Elizabeth Kerr of the Hollywood Reporter wrote about the film in 2018, describing the film as "an effortless pre-'97 allegory as well as a visually immersive and sensuous martial arts drama for the ages" and a "feverish romance that remains burned into all of our minds 25 years later. Lin’s sexual ambiguity and Cheung’s vague androgyny upend expectations of movie couples to brilliant effect, while simultaneously demonstrating what real screen chemistry looks like. When Lin finally lets loose with her legendary death stare, it’s only slightly more intense than the eroticism that preceded it". John Charles, in his book The Hong Kong Filmography gave the film a ten out of ten rating, referring to the film as the "key [Hong Kong] fantasy of the '90s thus far", and proclaimed it as "the most visually resplendent graceful and romantic films the genre has produced in some time" while noting that "although the one of the story varies, the visuals are always abundantly colorful, possessing a shading and natural texture that is in keeping with the flordi standards of Chinese fantasy while also displaying darker and more contemporary stylistics".

== Aftermath and influence ==
A sequel, The Bride with White Hair 2 was released December 1993. Yu's involvement in the second film was credited as a producer, but described his role as "supporting my editor David Wu, who was directing his first movie". Elley commented on the sequel in his overview of Hong Kong films from the 1993-1994 season, said the sequel provided a fine showcase for Lin and that the film was "more consciously erotic" and "more thinly plotted."

Pau would return to work with Yu on his films The Phantom Lover (1995) and Warriors of Virtue (1997) and Bride of Chucky (1998). Pau would apply techniques he used in The Bride with White Hair on his later films like Crouching Tiger, Hidden Dragon (2000), such his lighting tricks to enhance the sword fights.

While filming The Bride With White Hair 2, Lin said on set that she was planning to take a long break from acting. As of 2020, Lin's last major appearance in a film was in Wong Kar-wai's Ashes of Time (1994). Lim Ruey Yan of The Straits Times wrote that Brigitte Lin was remembered for her characters in films like Red Dust (1990) and her swordplay films Swordsman II (1992) and The Bride With White Hair. The look of her characters in Swordsman II, The East Is Red (1993) and The Bride With White Hair would be the basis of the design of character Xena from American television series Xena: Warrior Princess (1995-2001).

== Accolades ==
Award	Date of ceremony	Category	Recipient(s)	Result	Ref.
Golden Horse Film Festival	December 4, 1993	Best Adapted Screenplay	David Wu, Tang Pik-yin, Jason Lam Kee-to, Ronny Yu	Won	
Golden Horse Film Festival	December 4, 1993	Best Cinematography	Peter Pau	Nominated	
Golden Horse Film Festival	December 4, 1993	Best Art Direction	Eddie Ma	Nominated	
Golden Horse Film Festival	December 4, 1993	Best Original Song	Leslie Cheung, Albert Leung	Won	
Hong Kong Film Award	April 22, 1994	Best Editing	David Wu	Nominated	
Hong Kong Film Award	April 22, 1994	Best Cinematography	Peter Pau	Won	
Hong Kong Film Award	April 22, 1994	Best Art Direction	Eddie Ma	Won	
Hong Kong Film Award	April 22, 1994	Best Costume Make Up Design	Emi Wada, Tenny Cheung	Won	
Hong Kong Film Award	April 22, 1994	Best Original Film Score	Richard Yuen	Nominated	
Hong Kong Film Award	April 22, 1994	Best Original Film Song	Leslie Cheung, Albert Leung	Nominated	
