= Who's the Woman, Who's the Man? =

1996 Hong Kong film by Peter Chan

Who's the Woman, Who's the Man
- Theatrical release poster
- Directed by: Peter Chan
- Screenplay by: Aubrey Lam; James Yuen
- Story by: Peter Chan; Chan Wai; Clarence Hui; James Yuen; Aubrey Lam; Jojo Hui
- Produced by: Peter Chan
- Starring: Leslie Cheung; Anita Mui; Anita Yuen
- Cinematography: Henry Chan; Jingle Ma
- Edited by: Chan Kei-hop
- Music by: Clarence Hui; Chiu Tsang-hei; Peter Kam
- Production companies: United Filmmakers Organisation; Golden Harvest Entertainment
- Distributed by: Golden Harvest
- Release date: 15 August 1996
- Running time: 107 minutes
- Country: Hong Kong
- Language: Cantonese
- Box office: HK$20,915,998

Who's the Woman, Who's the Man? (金枝玉葉 2) is a 1996 Hong Kong romantic comedy film directed by Peter Chan and starring Leslie Cheung, Anita Yuen, Anita Mui, Jordan Chan, Theresa Lee, Eric Tsang. It is a sequel to the 1994 film He's a Woman, She's a Man.

== Plot ==
Lam Chi Wing (Anita Yuen) was infatuated with Sam Koo Ga Ming (Leslie Cheung), a pop music songwriter. Unfortunately, she struggled to get his attention until she devised a plan. Posing as a male singer, Lam Chi Wing gained popular attention – and won the heart of Sam (who was wondering if he was gay until he discovered Lam Chi Wing was actually a woman). However, Lam Chi Wing’s plan worked too well – and now she has become one of Cantopop’s biggest stars! She is recognized for her talent, winning a prize at a major awards ceremony for outstanding male singers. Overcome with emotion at the ceremony, she is asked to give a speech – and promptly blurts out that she loves Sam Koo Ga Ming. Rumors circulate in the entertainment industry about the duo’s “gay love affair.” Meanwhile, matters are complicated yet further when the Cantopop scene’s biggest diva – the gender-bending Fong Yim Mui (Anita Mui) returns after a decade-long absence. Fong Yim Mui develops a crush on Lam Chi Wing...who is shocked to discover that she is also falling for the charismatic diva!

== Cast and roles ==
- Leslie Cheung as Sam Koo Ka Ming
- Anita Mui as Fong Yim Mui
- Anita Yuen as Lam Chi Wing
- Jordan Chan as Yu Lo / 'Fish'
- Theresa Lee as O
- Eric Tsang as Auntie
- Carina Lau as Rose
- Moses Chan as Auditioning gay man
- Clarence Hui as film director
- Emil Chau as himself (Cameo appearance)
- Cheung Tat-ming (Cameo appearance)
- Ann Hui as Air stewardess (Cameo appearance)

== Accolades ==
Accolades
Ceremony	Category	Recipient	Outcome
16th Hong Kong Film Awards	Best Supporting Actress	Theresa Lee	Nominated
16th Hong Kong Film Awards	Best New Performer	Theresa Lee	Nominated
16th Hong Kong Film Awards	Best Art Direction	Yee Chung-Man	Nominated
16th Hong Kong Film Awards	Best Costume & Make Up Design	Dora Ng	Nominated
16th Hong Kong Film Awards	Best Original Film Song	Song: Caring Person (有心人) Composer/Singer: Leslie Cheung; Lyricist: Lin Xi	Nominated
33rd Golden Horse Awards	Best Original Film Song	Song: Caring Person (有心人) Composer/Singer: Leslie Cheung; Lyricist: Lin Xi	Nominated
