= Big Heat (album) =

Studio album by Leslie Cheung
- Released: 1 July 2000
- Genre: Cantopop

Leslie Cheung chronology
Countdown With You (1999)	Big Heat (2000)	Everything Follows the Wind (2003)

Big Heat is a Cantopop album by Leslie Cheung first released in July 2000. This album was released before Leslie Cheung's Passion Tour concert.

The song 'Fever' won China's Original Music Award (2001). The song 'I' is said to be a song of the self-statement of Leslie Cheung.

== Track listing ==
Big Heat track listing
No.	Title	Length
1.	"I" (Summer Passion Concert Finale)	3:42
2.	"Greatest Heat"	3:40
3.	"Love for Houston"	4:13
4.	"Someone Beside Me"	4:05
5.	"Miracle"	4:49
6.	"Don't Lie to Me"	4:22
7.	"Afternoon Tea"	5:10
8.	"Without Love"	4:11
9.	"It's Up to You"	3:59
10.	"There Is Always Sparkles"	3:52
11.	"Fever" (Mandarin)	3:40
12.	"I" (Mandarin)	3:41
Total length:		52:24
