= Virgin Snow (album) =

Studio album by Leslie Cheung
- Released: 5 February 1988
- Recorded: 1988
- Genre: Cantopop
- Label: Cinepoly
- Producer: Leslie Cheung; Alvin Leong; Patrick Yeung

Leslie Cheung chronology
Summer Romance (1987)	Virgin Snow (1988)	Hot Summer (1988)

Virgin Snow is the ninth Cantonese-language studio album by Hong Kong singer Leslie Cheung. It was released by Cinepoly Records on 5 February 1988. The album is the second album that Cheung released after he joined Cinepoly Records in Hong Kong.

== Background and development ==
Cheung composed the song "Missing You" and performed it in his Final Encounter of the Legend concert series of 1989. "Hot" was performed by Cheung in his World Tour 97 concert series, with Shu Qi acting as the Hot girl in the song of the dance track. "Run to the Future Days" is the theme song of the film A Better Tomorrow II.

"Love in the Snow" is also part of the compilation in Cheung's 1989's album Salute, which is a dedication album by the singer to his fellow composers, singers and lyricists whom he has held in high esteem up to that time in his career.

== Songs ==
Popular songs from Virgin Snow include "Love Killer (爱的凶手)", "Hot (热辣辣)" (which is a Cantopop version of the song "Lady Marmalade"), "Love in the Snow (雪中情)", "Missing You (想你)", "Burning My Eyes (烧毁我眼睛)", "You Are the Half of Me (你是我一半)" and "Most Beloved (最爱)".

== Track listing ==
1. Love Killer (爱的凶手) – 3:54
2. Hot (热辣辣) – 3:22
3. Run to the Future Days (奔向未来日子) – 4:27
4. Love in the Snow (雪中情) – 4:01
5. Never Possible (从未可以) – 5:45
6. Missing You (想你) – 4:56
7. Burn Up My Eyes (烧毁我眼睛) – 3:05
8. You Are the Half of Me (你是我一半) – 3:33
9. Jealousy (妒忌) – 3:51
10. Most Beloved (最爱) – 5:08

== Certifications ==
Region	Certification	Certified units/sales
Hong Kong (IFPI Hong Kong)	Gold	10,000^{*}
^{*} Sales figures based on certification alone.
