= Leslie Cheung =

Hong Kong singer and actor (1956–2003)

- 張國榮
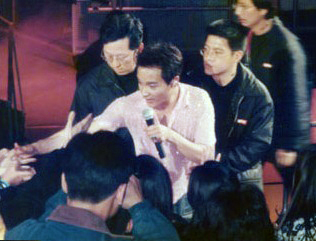
- Cheung during a live concert in 1997
- Born: Cheung Fat-chung; 12 September 1956; Kowloon, British Hong Kong
- Died: 1 April 2003 (aged 46); Central, Hong Kong
- Resting place: Po Fook Hill, Sha Tin, New Territories
- Citizenship: Canada; Hong Kong; British
- Education: University of Leeds
- Occupations: Singer; songwriter; actor
- Years active: 1977–2003
- Works: Discography; filmography
- Partner: Daffy Tong 唐鹤德 (1983–2003)
- Musical career
- Also known as: Elder Brother (Chinese: 哥哥)
- Genres: Cantopop; Mandopop
- Instrument: Vocals
- Labels: Polydor; Capital; Cinepoly; Rock; Universal

Cheung Kwok-wing
- Traditional Chinese: 張國榮
- Simplified Chinese: 张国荣
Transcriptions
Standard Mandarin
- Hanyu Pinyin: Zhāng Guóróng
Yue: Cantonese
- Jyutping: Zoeng1 Gwok3-wing4
- IPA: [tsœŋ˥ kʷɔk̚˧wɪŋ˩]

Cheung Fat-chung
- Traditional Chinese: 張發宗
- Simplified Chinese: 张发宗
Transcriptions
Standard Mandarin
- Hanyu Pinyin: Zhāng Fāzōng
Yue: Cantonese
- Jyutping: Zoeng1 Faat3-zung1

Leslie Cheung Kwok-wing (Note: traditional Chinese: 張國榮; simplified Chinese: 张国荣; Jyutping: Zoeng1 Gwok3-wing4) (born Cheung Fat-chung; (Note: traditional Chinese: 張發宗; simplified Chinese: 张发宗; Jyutping: Zoeng1 Faat3-zung1) 12 September 1956 – 1 April 2003) was a Hong Kong singer-songwriter and actor. One of the most influential cultural icons in the Sinophone world, Cheung was known for his debonair demeanour, flamboyant screen characters, and avant-garde, androgynous stage presence. Throughout his 26-year career, he released over 40 music albums and acted in 56 films.

Born in Kowloon, British Hong Kong, Cheung studied in England from the age of 12 until he returned home in 1976. He garnered attention in 1977 when entering RTV's Asian Singing Contest and achieved popularity in 1984 with a hit single "Monica". Cheung is regarded as one of the founding fathers of Cantopop for defining the music genre in the 1980s. He announced his "retirement" from music in 1989 and emigrated to Canada the following year, but he returned to Hong Kong in 1994. His reemergence from the musical retirement in the late 1990s, particularly in his 1996 album Red, was marked by sonic experimentation and daring imagery.

In addition to music, Cheung achieved pan-Asian fame with such films as A Better Tomorrow (1986) and A Chinese Ghost Story (1987). He won the Best Actor at the 1991 Hong Kong Film Awards for his role in Days of Being Wild (1990), and became world-renowned for his performances in Farewell My Concubine (1993) and Happy Together (1997). In April 2003, Cheung died by suicide by jumping off the Mandarin Oriental hotel in Hong Kong.

One of the best-selling musical acts in Hong Kong history, Cheung's studio albums Summer Romance (1987) and Most Beloved (1995) each sold over 300,000 copies and are among the best-selling albums of all time in the territory. In recognition of his work in the film industry, Cheung was selected as one of the Top 100 Foreign Actors of the 20th Century by Kinema Junpo. In 2010, CNN named him one of the 25 Greatest Asian Actors of All Time.

== Early life ==
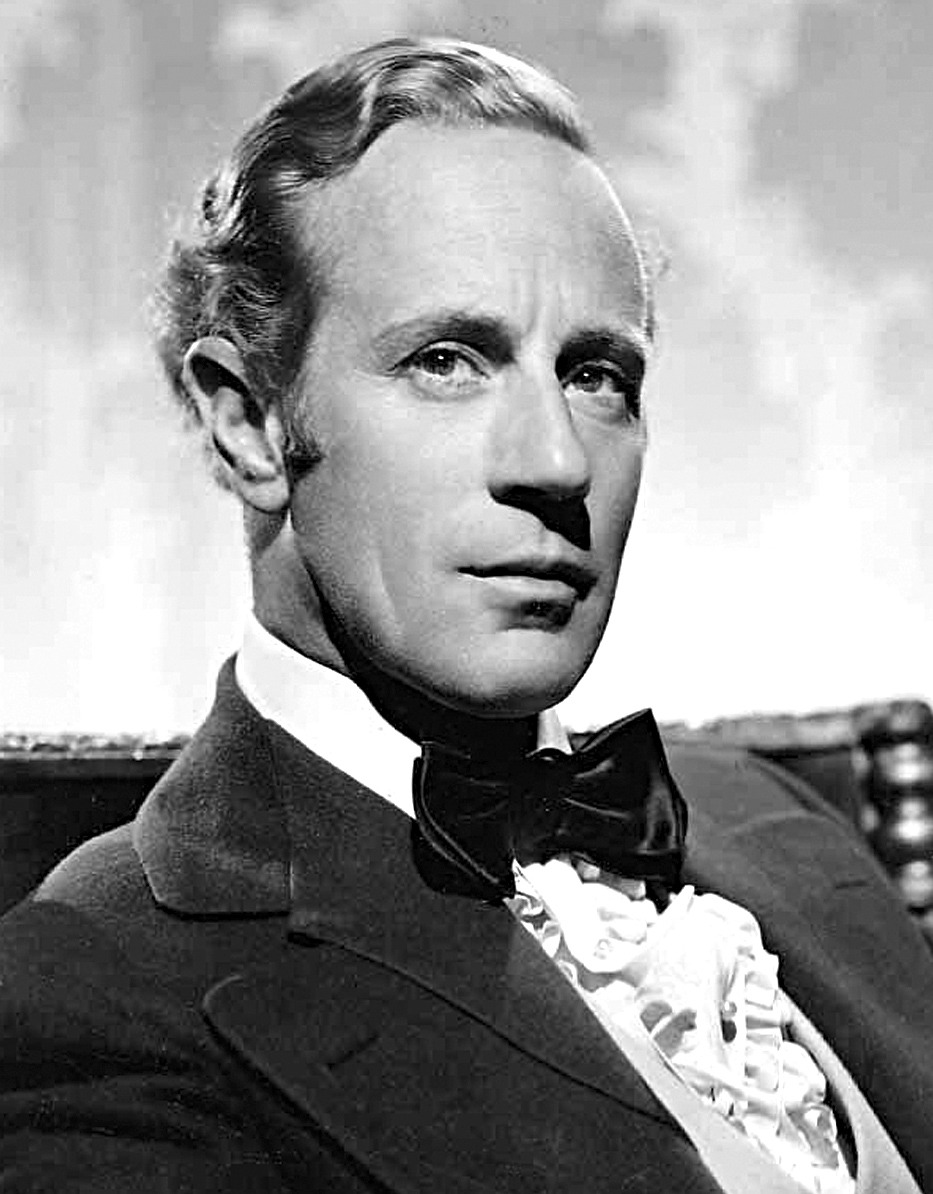
Cheung's English name was inspired by the actor Leslie Howard (pictured in Gone with the Wind).

Cheung was born in Kowloon, British Hong Kong, the youngest of 10 children in a middle-class Hakka family. His father, Cheung Wut-hoi, was a well-known tailor who specialised in suits, whose customers included Western celebrities such as film director Alfred Hitchcock and actors Marlon Brando and Cary Grant. Despite his father's reputation in the fashion industry, Cheung was uninspired by the profession. Cheung told many interviewers that he had an unhappy childhood, feeling emotionally estranged from his father and siblings, and frequently witnessing arguments and fights in the household. He felt "depressed sometimes" and longed for affection from his parents who were absent for most of his childhood. His father's abusive treatment of his mother had a lasting effect on Cheung's perspectives on marriage. When Cheung's father married another woman, his emotional life further deteriorated. Cheung was brought up by his grandmother, to whom he was very close. Cheung summed up his upbringing as a "silent resentment" with "nothing worth remembering," except for the death of his grandmother when he was in primary school, which was the "one thing that I do remember about my childhood."

Cheung attended Rosaryhill School in Hong Kong for secondary education, and at age 12 enrolled at an independent boys boarding school, Eccles Hall School Quidenham, near Norwich in England. During his time at Rosaryhill, Cheung did poorly academically, except that he excelled in the English language. He discovered a newfound interest in Western films and immersed himself in music, studying the original soundtrack of Romeo and Juliet. He recalled that there were "racial problems" when he was in England, but he managed to make friends. During weekends, he worked as a bartender and sometimes did amateur singing at his relatives' restaurant in Southend-on-Sea. He came across the film Gone with the Wind and chose Leslie as his English name, inspired by the actor Leslie Howard, feeling that "the name can be a man's or woman's; it's very unisex."

Cheung attended the University of Leeds, where he studied textile management. After one year of study, he returned to Hong Kong in 1976 when his father became paralysed on one side of his body following a stroke. As his father wanted all of his children to be at home, Cheung abandoned his studies and became a salesman for Levi's to make ends meet. Cheung recalled that during this time, "I had no plans. There I was, feeling like I was hanging in the middle of nowhere."

== Career ==
=== Beginnings ===
Upon returning to Hong Kong Cheung went back to high school as a mature student and formed a band, in which he was the lead singer with his classmates. In May 1977, the band members signed up individually for RTV's Asian Singing Contest. Only Cheung remained until the final round of the Hong Kong division, where he finished as the first runner-up with a rendition of "American Pie". He proceeded to the pan-Asian division, finishing fifth. Soon after the competition, RTV offered Cheung a three-year contract as a second-rate actor for RTV. He also signed with Polydor Records with hopes of releasing music albums.

Cheung's career in show business did not take off immediately. His first film role was in Erotic Dream of the Red Chamber (紅樓春上春, 1978), a softcore porn production that features his bare buttocks. His first two albums were solely recorded in English, and his third album, Lover's Arrow (情人箭, 1979) was recorded in Cantonese. The albums failed commercially, and critics lambasted Cheung's voice as "chicken-like". Cheung's first public performance at the 1977 Hong Kong Pop Folk Music Festival was booed off the stage by the audience. He described his early days into show business as "full of uncertainty ... I remember well that my singing career at the early stage was like 'a person running into a rock', full of despair and obstacles." Seeing little potential in Cheung, Polydor allowed him to depart on his own terms.

=== 1982–1989: Cantopop success and film crossover ===
Cheung signed with Capital Artists, a record label closely associated with the dominant television network TVB, in 1982. His first hit single, "The Wind Blows On" (風繼續吹), is a cover version of Momoe Yamaguchi's Japanese single "The Other Side of Goodbye" (さよならの向こう側). The song was successful on charts, revitalising Cheung's image as a Cantopop singer. The titular album was Cheung's first to be certified gold by the International Federation of the Phonographic Industry (IFPI) Hong Kong. His second album with Capital, Craziness (一片痴), is a compilation of songs he recorded for TVB dramas. The album was also a success, receiving a gold certification from the IFPI Hong Kong. He continued his movie crossover with roles mostly in teenage films, and earned his first major recognition for starring in Nomad (1982). While Cheung had already been a well-known actor with likeable personae in TVB productions, his role as a disillusioned teenager in Nomad foresaw his future reputation as an icon of rebel. The role garnered Cheung a nomination for Best Actor at the 1983 Hong Kong Film Awards.

The year 1984 was when Cheung achieved mass stardom. He released the hit single "Monica", a cover of the single by Japanese singer Kōji Kikkawa. The song topped charts in Hong Kong and was one of the 10 gold-certified songs honoured at TVB's 1984 Jade Solid Gold Best Ten Music Awards and the 1984 RTHK Top 10 Gold Songs Awards. The song's upbeat dance production introduced a new musical trend to Cantopop, in addition to the traditional sentimental ballads that had dominated the scene. Cheung's 1984 self-titled album, which included "Monica", was his first to be certified platinum by the IFPI Hong Kong and sold over 200,000 copies. He starred in the TVB drama Once Upon an Ordinary Girl (儂本多情, 1984) and the film Behind the Yellow Line (1984). In the latter, he co-starred with Maggie Cheung and Anita Mui, the latter of whom was also a musician. Both productions were commercially successful and put Cheung into the limelight as a prominent entertainer. As Cheung's fame expanded, the media began to pit him against fellow singer-actor Alan Tam, as the two were the most successful male Cantopop singers at the moment. The publicised so-called rivalry contributed to Cantopop's booming sales and lasted until the end of the 1980s.

Cheung's next albums with Capital were met with similar success. For Your Heart Only (為你鍾情, 1985) yielded the hit single "Wild Wind" (不羈的風), which was among the 10 gold-certified songs honoured at both TVB's Jade Solid Gold and RTHK Top 10 awards. The album also included songs Cheung recorded for TVB dramas, propelling his image as a romantic male lead. His 1986 single "Who Feels the Same?" (有誰共鳴) won the Gold Song Gold Award, the distinction for the most popular song of the year, at TVB's Jade Solid Gold Awards. With this achievement, Cheung became an arguably undisputed royalty of Cantopop. After the release of "Who Feels the Same?", he left Capital and joined Cinepoly Records, under which his first album was Summer Romance (1987). The album was the best-selling Cantopop release of the year, earning seven times platinum certification from the IFPI Hong Kong and sold over 350,000 copies. Its lead single, "Sleepless Night" (無心睡眠), won the Gold Song Gold Award at the 1987 Jade Solid Gold Awards. The next two albums, Virgin Snow and Hot Summer, both were released in 1988 and sold well, receiving gold and platinum certifications from the IFPI Hong Kong.

A turning point in his burgeoning acting career came when he was cast in John Woo's action film A Better Tomorrow (1986), in which he played a youthful and impulsive police officer torn between justice and his criminal brother. The film, along with A Chinese Ghost Story (1987), propelled him to pan-Asian fame, especially in South Korea and Japan. He then starred, once again, alongside Mui in Rouge (1988), which consolidated the pair's reputation as Hong Kong's greatest musicians and entertainers. Yiu-wai Chu, author of the book Hong Kong Cantopop: A Concise History (2017), noted that Cheung and Mui formed an "unprecedented" chemistry showcasing "mystic power of charisma", not only in films but also on stage performances together.

Cheung embarked on a 23-date tour at the Hong Kong Coliseum in mid-1988, sponsored by Pepsi. The tour was a sold-out and accumulated over 250,000 spectators. He also held several shows catering to the Chinese community in North America, visiting Atlantic City, Calgary, Toronto, and Vancouver. In light of the 1989 Tiananmen Square protests and the upcoming handover of Hong Kong, many Hong Kongers emigrated to Western countries. Following suit, Cheung announced his "retirement" from singing and emigrated to Vancouver, Canada, in 1989. Prior to his retirement, Cheung released three further albums under Cinepoly—Leslie '89, Salute, Final Encounter—all of which received platinum certifications from the IFPI Hong Kong. He won Most Popular Male Artist twice, at the 1988 and 1989 Jade Solid Gold Best Ten Music Awards. His "farewell concert tour", in support of the album Final Encounter, ran for 33 consecutive sold-out shows at the Hong Kong Coliseum. Cheung donated profits of his 1989 album Salute to the Hong Kong Academy for Performing Arts, which was named the Leslie Cheung Memorial Scholarship after his death.

=== 1990–1994: Music hiatus and major film roles ===
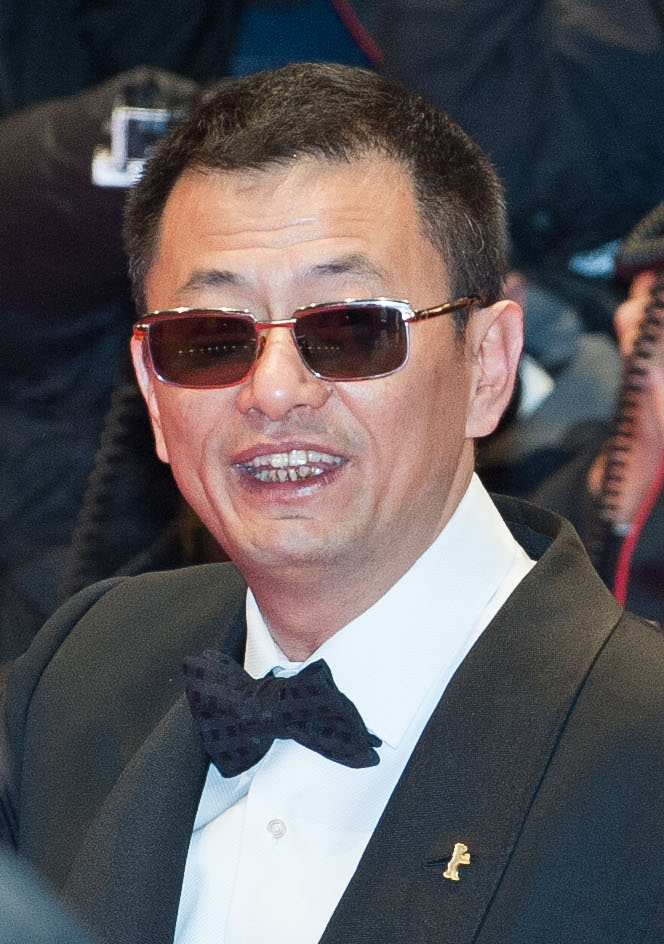
Cheung's role in Days of Being Wild, directed by Wong Kar-wai (pictured), earned him a Hong Kong Film Award for Best Actor.

After giving up singing, Cheung focused on his film career. He won the Best Actor at the 1991 Hong Kong Film Awards for his role in Wong Kar-Wai's Days of Being Wild (1990). He gained international acclaim for his role as a cross-dressing Peking opera actor in Farewell My Concubine (1993), which became the first Chinese film to win the Palme d'Or at Cannes. According to Chen Kaige and Lu Wei, director and scriptwriter of the film, respectively, Cheung lost Best Actor by one vote because a Cannes jury member mistook Cheung for a woman and voted him for Best Actress.

Although Cheung quit his singing career from 1989 to 1995, he composed more than ten songs during that time. In 1993, he won Best Original Movie Song Award from Golden Horse Film Festival for the theme song Red Cheek, White Hair for The Bride with White Hair (as a film score composer). In 1995, he wrote all three theme songs for the film The Phantom Lover (1995). As for songwriting, Cheung won four nominations for Best Original Movie Song Award at the Golden Horse Film Festival and Awards and two nominations for Best Original Film Song at the Hong Kong Film Awards.

=== 1995–2003: Return to music and Passion Tour ===
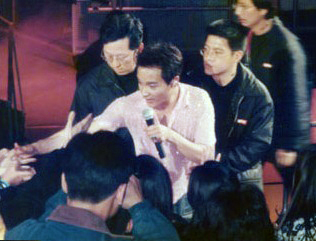
Cheung during the Live in Concert in 1997

In 1995 Cheung signed a contract with Rock Records. The same year he released his comeback album, Beloved, winning the award of IFPI Best Selling Album. Since his 1996 album Red, Cheung started a full-on collaboration with composer C. Y. Kong and lyricist Lin Xi, embracing a daring, self-reflective, and sexually ambiguous style of expression. Cheung's 1999 song "Left and Right Hand" (左右手) suggests at his sexuality and his 2000 song "I" (我), with two versions of lyrics in Mandarin and Cantonese by Lin Xi, is known as his come-out song. In 2001, Cheung directed the music video for his song "Bewildered" (夢到內河) with the help of William Chang, the production designer of The Days of Being Wild. The video, featuring intimacy between Japanese ballet dancer Nishijima Kazuhiro and Cheung, was banned by Hong Kong's public broadcaster TVB for promoting homosexuality; Cheung refused to edit the scenes out.

Cheung was consecutively nominated for Best Actor at Cannes for Chen Kaige's Temptress Moon (1996) and Wong Kar-wai's Happy Together (1997). In 1998, he was a member of the jury at the 48th Berlin International Film Festival. Cheung's last concert tour, Passion Tour, took place in Hong Kong and overseas from 2000 to 2001. He collaborated with fashion designer Jean Paul Gaultier, who transformed Cheung "From Angel to Devil" in four costumes: the Angel, the Pretty Boy, the Latin Lover, and the Devil – denoting cross-cultural drag and focusing on Cheung's androgyny and bisexuality. The Passion Tour broke attendance records throughout Asia, including a record for the first foreign artist to hold 16 concerts in Japan. Although the concert was acclaimed in Japan, Korea, and Canada, it was panned in Hong Kong mainly for his gender-crossing. Both Cheung and his agent Florence Chen attributed his later depression to the hostile reception from the Hong Kong media about the tour. In 2011, CCTV-15 commented that the Passion Tour represented the highest standard of Chinese concerts in performance, art concept, costume props and audience response, and had never been surpassed.

== Philanthropy ==
Cheung was a supporter of several charities concerning children's welfare. He was a patron of the Children's Cancer Foundation, a charity that cares for young children with cancer and their families. Cheung donated HK$1 million (US$128,000) in 1996 and launched five sets of RED cards to help raise funds for the Children's Cancer Foundation. He was the first Cantopop star to launch a charity fundraising at a concert. In 1996, although he rarely sang in public at that time, he sang three theme songs from his films to raise money for the elderly. For his 1997 concert at the HK Coliseum, Cheung set up a collection booth for the RED Card charity. Donations of HK$100 or above could obtain a set of cards. Cheung said, "I will lead the way, so I donated HK$1,000,000 to Hong Kong children's cancer fund in my own name." The concert raised more than HK$800,000, to which Cheung and his friends added more than HK$100,000, and made up a million Hong Kong dollars to donate to the cancer fund. He was also a patron of the End Child Sexual Abuse Foundation (ECSAF) (護苗基金), founded by veteran actress Josephine Siao (蕭芳芳).

In 1999, at a party to raise relief funds in the aftermath of the Taiwan earthquake, Cheung participated in a fried rice tasting event. He donated HK$250,000 for a bowl of rice; this was matched by fan donations, bringing the total to HK$500,000. In 2000, Sun Entertainment opened the "Star Second-hand Shop", where second-hand goods donated by celebrities were auctioned to raise money for the "Sun Love Fund". Leslie Cheung was known for his very good fashion sense and he was the first to donate three well-loved, carefully selected pieces to the auction. Leslie also donated his beloved badminton racket to IDclub Taiwan, to be auctioned to raise money for the children's cancer fund. In 1999 and 2000, he appeared in TVB charity shows to help raise funds for ECSAF, in which he was appointed a goodwill ambassador in 2002. In 2003, Cheung donated HK$100,000 to the Seedling protection fund, who were holding a large-scale charity night on 12 March. He told his party guests to give him cash instead of presents, then he donated all of the money that he received to the fund.

== Personal life ==
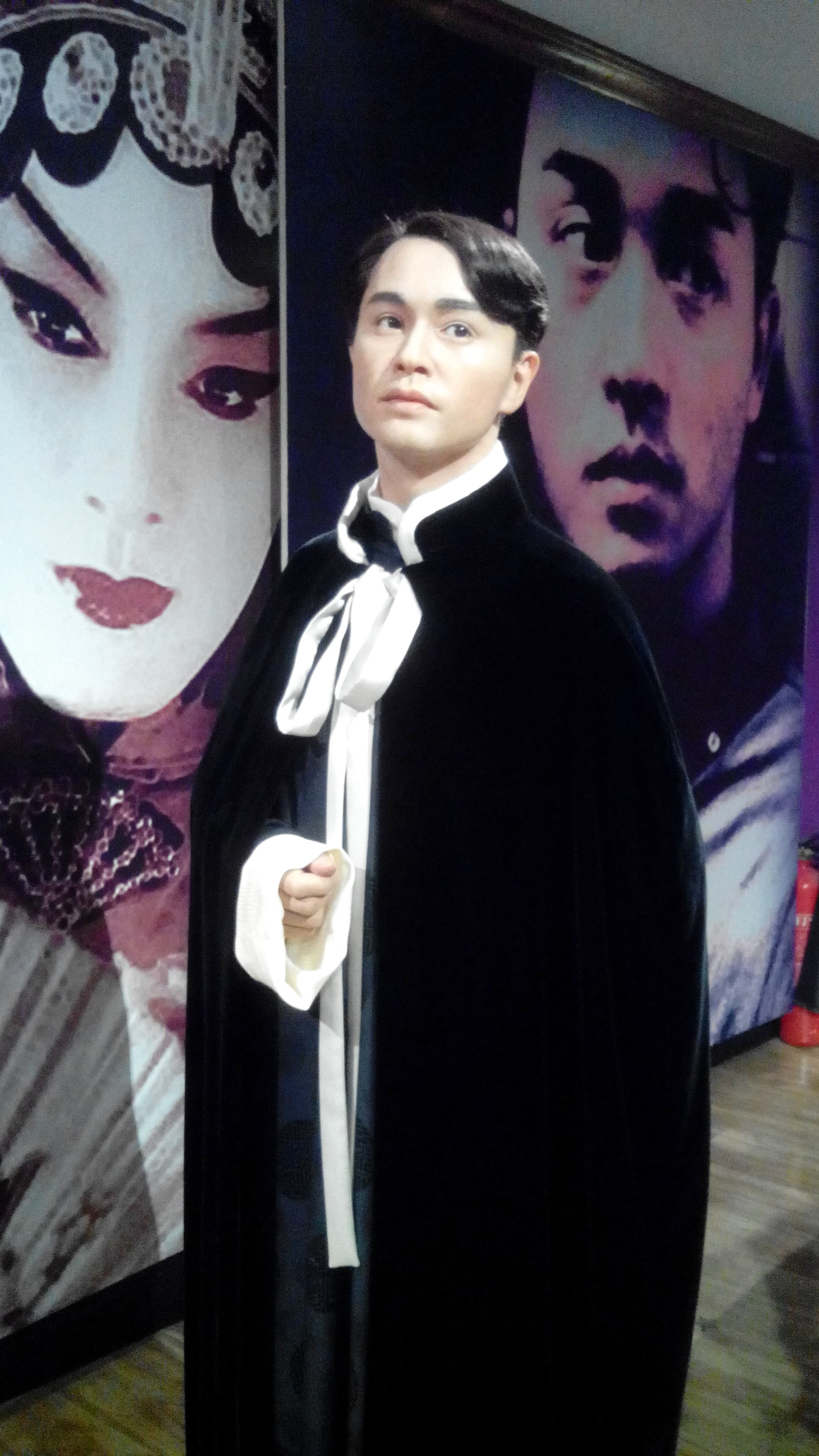
Cheung's wax figure at Madame Tussauds Hong Kong from Farewell My Concubine

In 1977, during the filming of the RTV series Love Story, the then 20-year-old Cheung met and fell in love with his 17-year-old co-star, Teresa Mo (毛舜筠), and they began dating after finishing the series. In 1979, Cheung proposed to Mo, but his sudden proposal startled her and she began to distance herself from him. Although Cheung and Mo eventually broke up after the proposal and briefly lost contact, they remained close friends after they had reunited for the 1992 film All's Well, Ends Well.

Cheung later went into a brief relationship with actress Shirley Yim (雪梨), the younger sister of Michelle Yim, but they broke up in 1980, due to their incompatibility for each other's lifestyles. Cheung and Ngai Sze-pui (倪詩蓓), a Hong Kong model and actress whom he met on the set of ATV series Agency 24, were in a relationship for two years from 1981 to 1983. In 1984, at the house of Albert Yeung, Cheung met Cindy Yeung (楊諾詩), the youngest daughter of Albert Yeung who had recently returned from Boston. Yeung was also a fan of Cheung and was seven years younger than him. They went out on several dates until Yeung returned to Boston. They continued their relationship through phone calls and letters, but would part ways in the following year, still remaining good friends. Cheung felt that if he had not been in show business, he could have already been married with children, like most of his friends.

Cheung and Daffy Tong Hok-tak (唐鶴德), godson of Cheung's mother, knew each other since childhood. During his concert at the Hong Kong Coliseum in 1997, Cheung sang the love song "The Moon Represents My Heart" (月亮代表我的心) and dedicated it to his mother and Tong. This moment is seen as an official recognition of Cheung's relationship with Tong, making him one of the first public figures in the Chinese world to come out.

In an interview in 1992, Cheung stated that "My mind is bisexual. It's easy for me to love a woman. It's also easy for me to love a man, too" and "I believe that a good actor would be androgynous, and ever changing." In 2000, Cheung talked about his love life: "In terms of lovers, I think I can be a better friend than a lover. Because I am a workaholic. To share my romance, that person has to compromise something." In a 2001 interview with Time magazine, Cheung said: "It's more appropriate to say I'm bisexual. I've had girlfriends. When I was 22 or so, I asked my girlfriend Teresa Mo to marry me."

== Death ==
Cheung died by suicide on April 1, 2003, at 6:43 pm (HKT). He jumped from the 24th floor of the Mandarin Oriental hotel, located in the Central district of Hong Kong Island. He left a suicide note saying that he had been suffering from depression.

Depression! Many thanks to all my friends. Many thanks to Professor Felice Lieh-Mak (麥列菲菲) [Cheung's last psychiatrist]. This year has been so tough. I can't stand it anymore. Many thanks to Tong Tong [nickname for Cheung's boyfriend Daffy Tong]. Many thanks to my family. Many thanks to Sister Fei (沈殿霞). In my life I have done nothing bad. Why does it have to be like this?

— Leslie Cheung's suicide note (translation)

After the jump, an informant told police, "someone fainted on the roadside", so only ambulances arrived at the scene and did not attract a large number of reporters; thus there were no photos of the scene. The news of Cheung's death shocked Chinese communities worldwide. The next day, his partner Daffy Tong confirmed that Cheung had been suffering from clinical depression and had been seeing Professor Felice Lieh Mak for treatment for almost a year. He also revealed that Cheung had previously attempted suicide in November 2002.

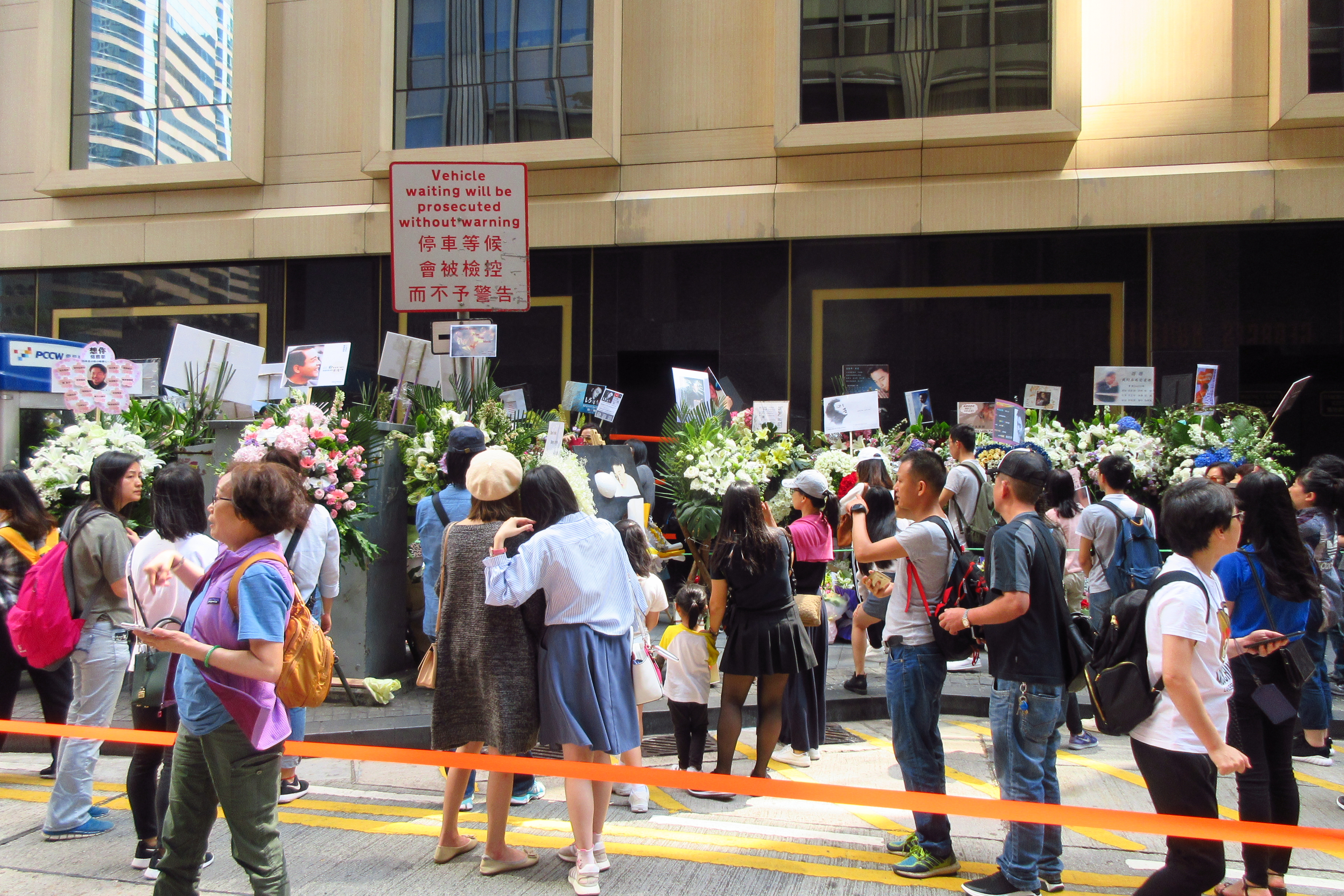
15th anniversary of Cheung's death, in Central, Hong Kong, 2018

Despite the SARS epidemic and the WHO's warning against travelling to Hong Kong, tens of thousands attended Cheung's memorial service on 7 April 2003, including celebrities and fans from China, Taiwan, Korea, Japan, Southeast Asia, the United States, and Canada. Cheung's funeral was held the next day. Three of Cheung's friends, director Tsui Hark, lyricist James Wong, and singer Jacky Cheung, delivered eulogies. Tsui Hark, Jacky Cheung, Stanley Kwan, Eddie Lau, Tony Leung Ka-Fai, Lin Xi, Lau Chun-Ho, and Law Kin-Kei served as pallbearers. Cheung was buried in Po Fook Hill, Sha Tin. His final album, Everything Follows the Wind (一切隨風), was released three months after his death.

In a 2012 interview, Cheung's eldest sister, Ophelia (died 2017), stated Cheung was diagnosed with clinical depression caused by a chemical imbalance in the brain. She mentioned that reporters were frequently found outside her brother's home, hampering his ability to visit his doctor. Thus, he would come over to her house to consult with his doctor. He would ask his sister, "Why am I depressed? I have money and so many people love me." He was reluctant to take medication for his depression.

== Impact and legacy ==
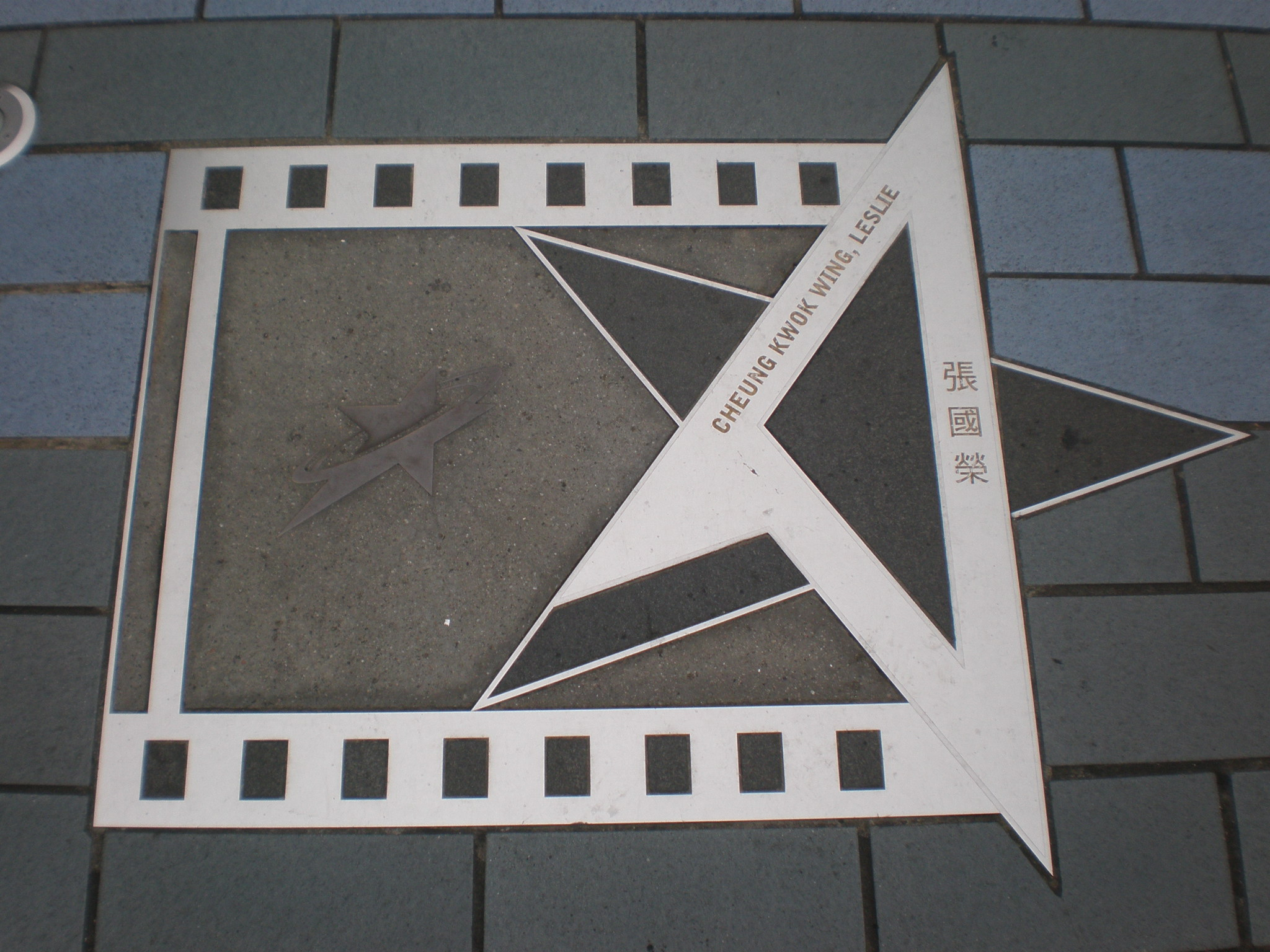
Cheung's star on the Avenue of Stars in Hong Kong

Cheung's albums Summer Romance (1987) and Most Beloved (1995) each sold over 300,000 copies in Hong Kong and are among the best-selling albums of all time in the territory. In 2010, he was voted in a CNN poll as the third most iconic musician of all time, after Michael Jackson and The Beatles. Douglas Parkes from South China Morning Post wrote that, "Cheung’s importance to the cultural memory of contemporary Hong Kong cannot be overstated. His life paralleled that of his hometown – as Cheung rose to prominence, so too did Hong Kong itself. And likewise to many his death also marked the end, or at least the beginning of the end, of the 'old' Hong Kong." Anthony Fung, a professor at the Chinese University of Hong Kong opined that, "After so many years, we hardly find any new icons, new superstars who could reach that level of importance".

In recognition of his film career, Cheung was selected as one of the Top 100 Foreign Actors of the 20th Century by Kinema Junpo in 2000. In 2005, he was named one of the 100 Outstanding Actors in the Past 100 Years of Chinese Cinema by the Chinese Film Performance Art Society. That same year, the Hong Kong Film Awards published a list of the 100 Best Chinese Films in the Past 100 Years of Chinese Cinema, with Cheung appearing in eight of the selected films, the most among Chinese actors. In March 2010, CNN named him one of the 25 greatest Asian actors of all time. In 2013, Cheung became the first contemporary celebrity to be included in the Cihai. The same year, Cheung's fans set a Guinness World Record in 2013 for the largest origami crane exhibition by creating 1,956,912 origami cranes, a tribute to his birth date. In 2018, 55383 Cheungkwokwing, a main-belt asteroid discovered by Bill Yeung at the Desert Eagle Observatory in 2003, was named in memory of Cheung.

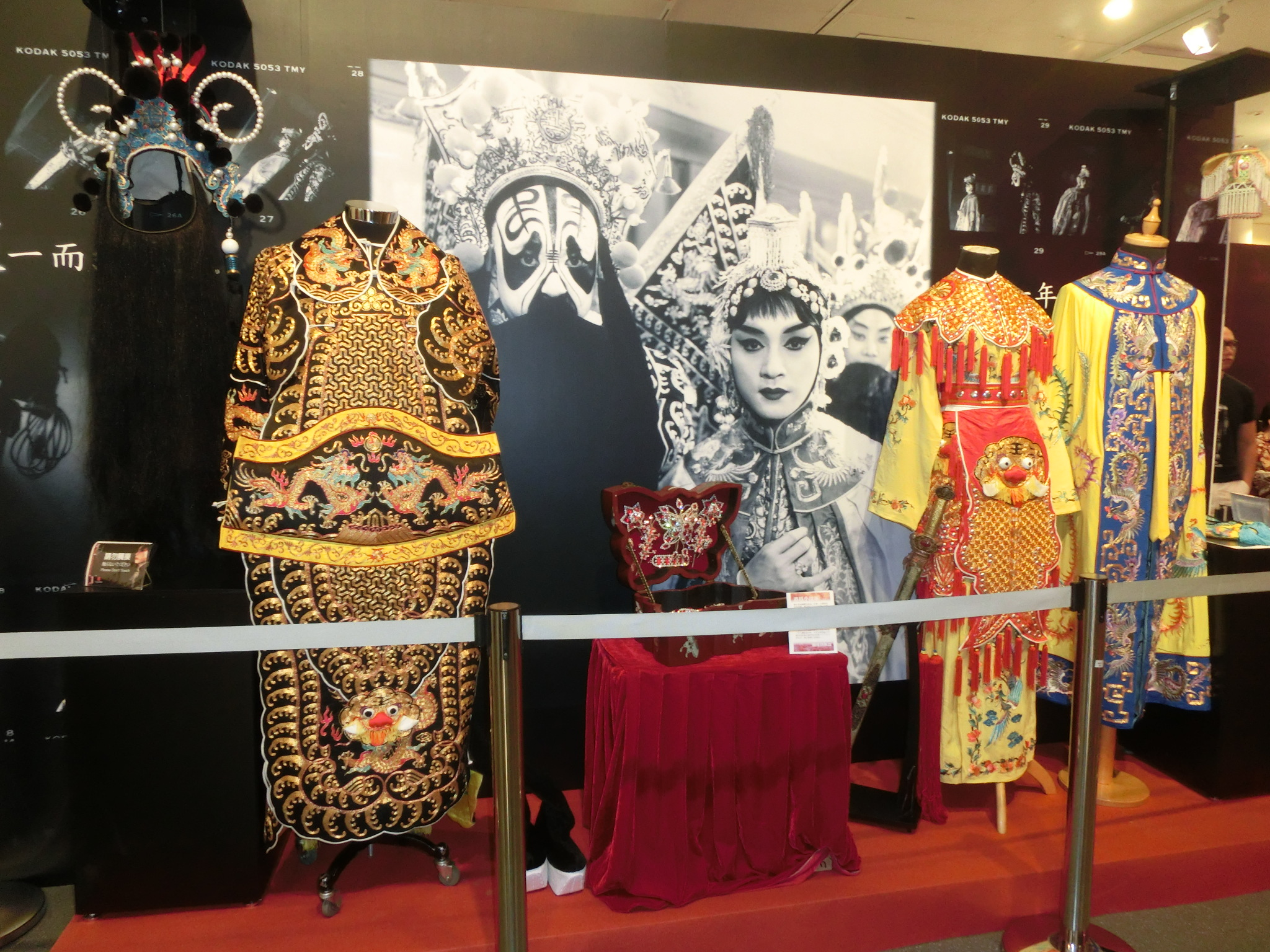
Art of Leslie Cheung's Movies exhibition at Times Square (Hong Kong), April 2013

Many memorial events were held over the years since Cheung's death, including the memorial concerts in 2003, 2008, 2013, and 2023 organised by Cheung's agent Florence Chan. The proliferation of memorial events has attracted scrutiny and doubts over commercialisation and opacity of revenues. Cheung's agent Florence Chan faced criticism in 2013 for her much-hyped revelation of an important secret about Cheung at the year's memorial concert, which turned out to be a dream she had about Cheung telling her he could finally rest. Chinese writer Han Songluo commented then: "In the ten years of commemorating Leslie Cheung, what we observe is an exhaustive Leslie Cheung Commemorating Contest, where the focus is not on commemoration but on novelty. It must feature new information, new developments, and new perspectives." In 2023, concerns about overexploitation were raised again when two memorial concerts, organised by Chan and Universal Music, Cheung's agent and label respectively, took place on the same day of 1 April in Hong Kong, featuring separate groups of celebrities covering his songs.

== Discography ==
Studio albums

- Lover's Arrow (情人箭) (1979)
- Wind Blows On (風繼續吹) (1983)
- Craziness (一片痴) (1983)
- Leslie (Monica) (1984)
- For Your Heart Only (為你鍾情) (1985)
- Stand Up (1986)
- Past Love (當年情) (1986)
- Summer Romance (1987)
- Virgin Snow (1988)
- Hot Summer (1988)
- Leslie '89 (1989)
- Salute (1989)
- Final Encounter (1989)
- Red (紅) (1996)
- Countdown With You (陪你倒數) (1999)
- Big Heat (大熱) (2000)
- Everything Follows the Wind (一切隨風) (2003)

== Awards and nominations ==
=== RTHK Top 10 Gold Songs Awards ===
Year	Category	Recipient	Result
1984	Top 10 Gold Songs	"Monica"	Won
1985	Top 10 Gold Songs	"Wild Wind" (不羈的風)	Won
1986	Top 10 Gold Songs	"Past Love" (當年情)	Won
1987	Top 10 Gold Songs	"Sleepless Night" (無心睡眠)	Won
1987	Best CD	Summer Romance	Won
1987	Sales Award (Best-Selling Album of the Year)	Summer Romance	Won
1988	Top 10 Gold Songs	"Silence is Golden" (沉默是金)	Won
1988	Top 10 Gold Songs	"Don't Need Too Much" (無需要太多)	Won
1988	IFPI Award	Leslie Cheung (張國榮)	Won
1999	Top 10 Gold Songs	"Left Right Hand" (左右手)	Won
1999	Golden Needle Award (金針獎)	Leslie Cheung (張國榮)	Won
2000	Top 10 Gold Songs	"Big Heat" (大熱)	Won
2002	Silver Jubilee Award	Leslie Cheung (張國榮)	Won

=== Jade Solid Gold Best Ten Music Awards ===
Year	Category	Recipient	Result
1983	Top 10 Gold Songs	"Wind Blows On" (風繼續吹)	Nominated
1984	Top 10 Gold Songs	"Monica"	Won
1985	Top 10 Gold Songs	"Wild Wind" (不羈的風)	Won
1986	Top 10 Gold Songs	"Past Love" (當年情)	Won
1986	Top 10 Gold Songs	"Who Resonates With Me" (有誰共鳴)	Won
1986	Gold Song Gold Award (金曲金獎)	"Who Resonates With Me" (有誰共鳴)	Won
1987	Top 10 Gold Songs	"Sleepless Night" (無心睡眠)	Won
1987	Gold Song Gold Award (金曲金獎)	"Sleepless Night" (無心睡眠)	Won
1988	Top 10 Gold Songs	"Silence is Golden"(沉默是金)	Won
1988	Top 10 Gold Songs	"Closer" (贴身)	Won
1988	Most Popular Male Artist (最受歡迎男歌星)	Leslie Cheung (張國榮)	Won
1989	Top 10 Gold Songs	"Starting from Zero" (由零開始)	Won
1989	Most Popular Male Artist (最受歡迎男歌星)	Leslie Cheung (張國榮)	Won
1999	Honours Award (榮譽大獎)	Leslie Cheung (張國榮)	Won
2000	Four Channel Award (Best Album of the Year)	Untitled	Won
2000	Honours Award (榮譽大獎)	Leslie Cheung (張國榮)	Won

=== Other music awards ===
Year	Award	Category	Recipient	Result
1988	Ultimate Song Chart Awards	Ultimate Male Artist Gold Award	Leslie Cheung (張國榮)	Won
1989	Ultimate Song Chart Awards	Ultimate Male Artist Gold Award	Leslie Cheung (張國榮)	Won
1989	Ultimate Song Chart Awards	IFPI Award	Side Face (側面)	Won
1999	Ultimate Song Chart Awards	Ultimate Song Award (No. 1 Song of the Year)	"Left Right Hand"(左右手)	Won
1999	Metro Radio Hit Music Awards	Metro Radio Hit Song of the Year	"Left Right Hand"(左右手)	Won
1999	Metro Radio Hit Music Awards	Metro Radio Top 10 Hit Songs	"Left Right Hand"(左右手)	Won
2000	CCTV-MTV Music Honours	Asia's Biggest Superstar	Leslie Cheung (張國榮)	Won
2001	Chinese Pop Music Media Awards	Best Male Singer	Leslie Cheung (張國榮)	Won

=== Hong Kong Film Awards ===
Year	Category	Film	Result
1983	Best Actor	Nomad (烈火青春)	Nominated
1988	Best Actor	A Better Tomorrow 2 (英雄本色2)	Nominated
1988	Best Original Film Song	A Chinese Ghost Story (倩女幽魂)	Nominated
1989	Best Actor	Rouge (胭脂扣)	Nominated
1991	Best Actor	Days of Being Wild (阿飛正傳)	Won
1994	Best Original Film Song	The Bride With White Hair (白髮魔女傳)	Nominated
1995	Best Actor	He's a Woman, She's a Man (金枝玉葉)	Nominated
1995	Best Original Film Song	He's a Woman, She's a Man (金枝玉葉)	Won
1996	Best Original Film Song	The Phantom Lover (夜半歌聲)	Nominated
1997	Best Actor	Viva Erotica (色情男女)	Nominated
1997	Best Original Film Song	Who's the Woman, Who's the Man? (金枝玉葉2)	Nominated
1998	Best Actor	Happy Together (春光乍洩)	Nominated
2003	Best Actor	Inner Senses (異度空間)	Nominated

=== Golden Horse Awards ===
Year	Category	Film	Result
1991	Best Leading Actor	Days of Being Wild (阿飛正傳)	Nominated
1993	Best Original Song	The Bride With White Hair (白髮魔女傳)	Won
1994	Best Original Song	He's a Woman, She's a Man (金枝玉葉)	Nominated
1995	Best Original Song	The Phantom Lover (夜半歌聲)	Nominated
1996	Best Leading Actor	Temptress Moon (風月)	Nominated
1996	Best Original Song	Temptress Moon (風月)	Nominated
1996	Best Original Song	Who's the Woman, Who's the Man? (金枝玉葉2)	Nominated
1997	Best Leading Actor	Happy Together (春光乍洩)	Nominated
2000	Best Leading Actor	Double Tap (鎗王)	Nominated
2002	Best Leading Actor	Inner Senses (異度空間)	Nominated

=== Other film awards ===
Year	Award	Category	Film	Result
1991	Asia Pacific Film Festival	Best Actor	Days of Being Wild (阿飛正傳)	Nominated
1993	Cannes Film Festival	Best Actor	Farewell My Concubine (霸王別姬)	Nominated
1994	Hong Kong Film Critics Society Awards	Best Actor	Ashes of Time (東邪西毒)	Won
1994	Japan Film Critics Society	Best Actor	Farewell My Concubine	Won
1994	Venice Film Festival	Best Actor	Ashes of Time	Nominated
1996	Cannes Film Festival	Best Actor	Temptress Moon (風月)	Nominated
1997	Cannes Film Festival	Best Actor	Happy Together (春光乍洩)	Nominated

=== Ming Pao Power Academy Awards ===
Year	Category	Recipient	Result
2000	Honorary Award	Leslie Cheung (張國榮)	Won
2000	Outstanding Male Singer	Leslie Cheung (張國榮)	Won
2002	Best Actor	Inner Senses (異度空間)	Won

== See also ==
- Cinema of Hong Kong
- Music of Hong Kong
- List of suicides of LGBTQ people

Awards and achievements
Hong Kong Film Awards
Preceded by Chow Yun-Fat for All About Ah Long	Best Actor; 1991 for Days of Being Wild	Succeeded by Eric Tsang for Alan and Eric Between Hello and Goodbye
Hong Kong Film Critics Society Awards
Preceded by None	Best Actor; 1994	Succeeded by Stephen Chow
RTHK Top 10 Gold Songs Awards
Preceded by Anita Mui	Golden Needle Award; 1999	Succeeded by Jacky Cheung
Jade Solid Gold Best Ten Music Awards
Preceded by Alan Tam	Most Popular Male Artist; 1988, 1989	Succeeded by Andy Lau
Preceded by Vacant	Honours Award; 1999, 2000	Succeeded by Anita Mui
Ultimate Song Chart Awards
Preceded by None	Ultimate Male Artist Gold Award; 1988, 1989	Succeeded by Anthony Lun
Ming Pao Power Academy Awards
Preceded by None	Honorary Award; 2000 (& Andy Lau)	Succeeded by Stephen Chow
Preceded by None	Outstanding Male Singer; 2000	Succeeded by Eason Chan
Preceded by Andy Lau for Love on a Diet	Outstanding Actor in Film; 2002 for Inner Senses	Succeeded by Andy Lau for Running on Karma
