= The Phantom Lover =

1995 film by Ronny Yu

- Theatrical release poster
- Directed by: Ronny Yu
- Written by: Roy Szeto; Raymond Wong; Ronny Yu
- Produced by: Leslie Cheung; Michael Ng; Raymond Wong
- Starring: Leslie Cheung; Jacklyn Wu; Huang Lei
- Cinematography: Peter Pau
- Edited by: David Wu
- Music by: Chris Babida
- Distributed by: Mandarin Films Ltd.
- Release date: July 22, 1995
- Running time: 100 minutes
- Country: Hong Kong
- Languages: Cantonese; Mandarin

The Phantom Lover (Chinese: 夜半歌聲) is a 1995 Hong Kong musical romantic drama film directed by Ronny Yu and starring Leslie Cheung and Jacklyn Wu. It is a remake of the 1937 film Song at Midnight.

The film itself is loosely based on the real-life "Phantom Lover" Dan Cheung (known as such due to the ghostlike nature of the women he romanced) and is a loose adaptation of the classic Romeo and Juliet romance where love between two passionate lovers were ultimately doomed when parental opposition was the major obstacle. The main theme of the film was, however, a strong adaptation of Gaston Leroux's 1910 novel The Phantom of the Opera.

== Plot ==
In 1940s-era China, Song Dan Ping (Leslie Cheung) was an ambitious theatre actor and owner who built his dream playhouse from where he entertained and dazzled the theatre-loving populace with his adaptation of classics such as Romeo and Juliet and other tragic love stories.

His passionate and devoted performances drew the attention of To Wan-Yin (Jacqueline Wu), the beautiful daughter of a corrupt and despotic official. To Wan-Yin would sneak out of her house with her personal maid in the night to watch Dan Ping's play (he was acting as Romeo in Shakespeare's play--'Romeo and Juliet'). During the patriarchal era, romance between an actor (considered useless and without a bright future) and a rich man's daughter was definitely a taboo (it was an irony that the couple were 're-enacting' Romeo and Juliet in the movie). Hence after each performance, Dan Ping and Wan-Yin would have a rendezvous at the theatre and their love deepened to the extent that they vowed to run away from the city and to get married elsewhere.

However, Wan-Yin was betrothed to a man she did not love who was reputed to be cruel and sadistic; this persuaded her to throw caution to the wind and run away from home with Song. It also turned out that Wan-Yin's father arranged the marriage (as was the custom of China at that time) to benefit himself as he sought to become allies with another official of great influence, whose friendship would help to improve his social standing.

As fate would have it, the eloping pair were apprehended before the scheme could be carried out, and Wan-maid, Yin's who had helped them flee, was severely beaten until she became disabled. Wan-Yin was kept inside the house by her father in the meanwhile to stop her from eloping.

This did not end the couple's tragic fate. Wan-Yin's fiancé had arranged his men to harm Dan Ping. After disfiguring Dan Ping's face with burning acid, they set the theatre ablaze with Dan Ping and many other innocent people in it. After Wan-Yin learned of the fire and Dan Ping's disappearance, she resigned to fate and married her fiancé.

On her wedding night, Wan-Yin's husband found out that she was not a virgin (he did not 'see red' on their nuptial night). Wan-Yin was then abused and eventually drove out of the house and was forced to lead a wandering life with her crippled maid. Wan-Yin soon lost all her senses as her longing for Dan Ping drove her crazy.

Many years later, a group of performing arts students traveled from Beijing to perform in the city where Song Dan Ping had performed, eager to adapt his exploits and to improvise on his legendary performances. They came to the theatre hall, with its outer foundations still intact but with the internal sections terribly destroyed, and made their temporary quarters there. Many people believed Song to have perished in the fire but he was indeed still living as the students made their home in his theatre.

Song, however, was badly scarred in the face and was never to reveal his once-handsome face to the outside world and earned the nickname 'The Phantom lover' by his once-loving audience. His personality was also changed as he was severely depressed and morose after the tragic incidents and had lived the life of a hermit ever since. When the students arrived at the theatre, he was slightly encouraged to reveal himself when one of the more talented students tried unsuccessfully to sing his ultimate love serenade whom he dedicated to Wan-Yin. Song later lashed out at the students' incompetence when he could no longer bear such disparaging performances of his efforts and decided to reveal himself and his scarred face to them.

When the officials heard that the students tried to popularise Song in their theatre performances and reenact his glorious days, they came to arrest the students. Little did they know their evil deeds were exposed to the public who came for the performances. One by one, the accomplices to the plot to burn down the theatre were forced to confess in detail, to their crimes.

Justice was finally achieved but only as a hollow victory on Song's part. In the closing moments, Song was seen holding his lover's hands. Wan-Yin had since become an invalid, and she had also become blind as a result of her ex-husband shooting her. She recognized Song, but lamented that she could not see him - a blessing for him, since she couldn't see how ugly his face had become. The two lovers finally departed the town in a coach, together at last. An epilogue reveals that Wan-Yin died a year later—probably due to the shooting injuries—and that Song never loved another woman in his lifetime.

== Cast ==
- Leslie Cheung as Song Danping
- Lei Huang as Wei Qing
- Philip Kwok
- Fong Pao as Zhao
- Roy Szeto as Zhao Jum
- Chien-lien Wu as Yun Yan
- Liwen Yu as Agent in 1926

Director Ronny Yu described that it was a challenge to portray Cheung in horror aesthetics while maintaining his familiar, charming image for his female fans. Yu juggled with this dilemma by often using long shots and covering only half of his face with blisters. This way he avoid disfiguration like previous remakes. Film and media studies professor Yiman Wang argues that this did not obviate but paradoxically highlights "the deep-seated identity crisis that Hong Kong experiences" a few years before the impending Handover of Hong Kong. The further expands, "In other words, the more the filmmaker tries to maximize unproblematic entertainment, the more it hints at the underlying anxiety." This argument is furthered by the movie's happy ending.

== Critical reception ==
Andrew Chan of the Film Critics Circle of Australia writes, ""The Phantom Lover" could easily have been a cinematic classic, instead director Yu fails to focus the film on far more important things, namely the central doomed love affair and the rather lack of Cheung and Wu. "

== Music ==
The film's theme song was composed and sung by Leslie Cheung entitled 夜半歌聲 The Phantom Lover. The song also featured in his album 寵愛 Beloved. Another individual song popularised by this film is 一輩子失去了你 Endless Embrace also found in the same album. The film's Western-influenced score was composed by Chris Babida.

Cheung's composition and singing of the opera sets apart previous Chinese adaptations of the Phantom of the Opera. His singing was dubbed in the movie's post-production phase.

== Awards ==
At the Hong Kong Film Award 1996, the movie won Best Art Direction, and Best Costume & Make Up Design.

== Later screenings ==
- 2018: At the 6th Singapore Chinese Film Festival, the movie was screened along with others by Cheung to commemorate his 15th death anniversary.
- 2020: Hong Kong's Mandarin Motion Pictures released a remastered version in 4K resolution in April 2020.
