= List of Hong Kong films of 1993 =

This article lists feature-length Hong Kong films released in 1993.

== Box office ==
The highest-grossing Hong Kong films released in 1993, by domestic box office gross revenue, are as follows:

Highest-grossing films released in 1993
Rank	Title	Domestic gross
1	Flirting Scholar	HK$40,171,804
2	All's Well, Ends Well Too	HK$35,537,690
3	C'est la vie, mon chéri	HK$31,167,583
4	City Hunter	HK$30,843,062
5	Fong Sai-yuk	HK$30,736,564
6	Crime Story	HK$28,265,884
7	Once Upon a Time in China III	HK$27,540,561
8	Fight Back to School III	HK$25,778,434
9	The Eagle Shooting Heroes	HK$23,463,120
10	Fong Sai-yuk II	HK$23,076,080

== Releases ==
Title	Director	Cast	Genre	Notes
1993
1/3 Lover				
93 jie tou ba wang				
All About Tin				
All Men Are Brothers: Blood of the Leopard	Billy Chan	Tony Leung, Joey Wong, Elvis Tsui, Sean Lau	Martial arts	
All Over the World	Yuen See Man			
All's Well, Ends Well Too	Clifton Ko	Samuel Hui, Leslie Cheung		
Always on My Mind	Jacob Cheung			
Angel of the Road	Barry Chung			
Angel of Vengeance	Robert Lau			
Angel Terminators II	Chan Lau			
Angel the Kickboxer	Godfrey Ho			
Angel's Project	Cheung Ho Tak			
The Assassin	Billy Chung			
The Bare-Footed Kid				
The Bride with White Hair	Ronny Yu	Brigitte Lin, Leslie Cheung		
Butterfly and Sword	Michael Mak	Tony Leung Chiu-Wai, Michelle Yeoh, Donnie Yen, Joey Wong	Wuxia / Romance	
Can't Stop Loving You	Lui Shui Lun	Bowie Lam, Alex Fong, Idy Chan	Drama	TV-film
Can't Stop My Crazy Love For You	Hon Wai Tat	Simon Yam, Yvonne Yung, Wan Yeung-ming, Michael Wong, Law Lan	Adult	
City Hunter	Wong Jing	Jackie Chan	Action, comedy	In movie bioscope on 14 January 1993 along with Fight Back to School III Copyright notice: 1992.
Come Fly the Dragon	Eric Tsang	Andy Lau, Tony Leung, Fennie Yuen, Norman Chu, Shing Fui-On	Action / Comedy	
Crazy Love	Roman Cheung	Loletta Lee, Poon Jan-Wai, Shing Fui-On, Tommy Wong	Erotic / Romantic / Comedy / Drama	
Crime Story	Kirk Wong, Jackie Chan	Jackie Chan, Kent Cheng	Action, crime.	
A Day Without Policeman	Johnny Lee	Simon Yam, Yu Li, Tommy Wong	Crime	
Days of Tomorrow	Jeffrey Lau	Andy Lau, Jay Lau, Carrie Ng, Yip San, Hilary Tsui, Henry Fong, Deanie Ip	Romance	
The Eagle Shooting Heroes	Jeffrey Lau	Leslie Cheung, Brigitte Lin, Tony Leung Chiu-Wai, Carina Lau, Kenny Bee, Veronica Yip, Jacky Cheung, Maggie Cheung, Tony Leung Ka-fai, Joey Wong	Comedy	
The Eight Hilarious Gods	Jeffrey Chiang	Rosamund Kwan, Adam Cheng, Deric Wan, Sandra Ng, Ng Man-tat, Lawrence Cheng	Comedy / Fantasy	
Executioners	Johnnie To	Michelle Yeoh, Anita Mui, Maggie Cheung		
Fight Back to School III	Wong Jing	Stephen Chow, Anita Mui, Anthony Wong, Bryan Leung, Philip Chan	Comedy	In movie bioscope on 14 January 1993 along with City Hunter
The Final Judgement	Norman Chan	Simon Yam, Cecilia Yip, Paul Chun, Kenneth Chan, Bill Tung, Esther Kwan	Crime	
First Shot	David Lam	Ti Lung, Simon Yam, Maggie Cheung, Waise Lee, Andy Hui	Crime	
Flirting Scholar	Lee Lik-chi	Stephen Chow, Gong Li, Natalis Chan, Wong Jim, Cheng Pei-pei, Bryan Leung, Gordon Liu, Kingdom Yuen, Francis Ng, Yammie Lam	Comedy	
Fong Sai-yuk	Corey Yuen	Jet Li, Josephine Siao	Action / Martial arts / Comedy	
Fong Sai-yuk II	Corey Yuen	Jet Li, Josephine Siao	Action / Martial arts / Comedy	
Future Cops	Wong Jing	Andy Lau, Jacky Cheung, Aaron Kwok, Chingmy Yau, Dicky Cheung, Simon Yam, Ekin Cheng, Richard Ng, Winnie Lau, Charlie Yeung, Andy Hui, Kingdom Yuen, Ken Lo, Billy Chow	Action / Comedy / Fantasy	
Green Snake	Tsui Hark	Maggie Cheung, Joey Wong, Vincent Zhao, Wu Hsing-kuo	Fantasy	
Guns & Roses	Philip Ko	Simon Yam, Sakakibara Yoshie, Robin Shou, Wilson Lam	Crime / Drama	
He Ain't Heavy, He's My Father	Chor Yuen	Tony Leung Ka-fai, Tony Leung Chiu-Wai, Carina Lau, Anita Yuen, Lawrence Cheng	Comedy / Drama	
Hero – Beyond the Boundary of Time	Blackie Ko	Tony Leung, Dicky Cheung, Ng Suet Man, Veronica Yip, Kent Tong	Comedy	
Heroes Among Heroes	Yuen Woo-ping	Donnie Yen, Wong Yuk, Fennie Yuen, Ng Man Tat, Sheila Chan	Martial arts	
The Heroic Trio	Johnnie To	Michelle Yeoh, Anita Mui, Maggie Cheung		
Holy Weapon	Wong Jing	Carol Cheng, Michelle Yeoh, Maggie Cheung, Simon Yam, Sharla Cheung, Dicky Cheung, Ng Man-tat, Sandra Ng, Damian Lau, Esther Kwan	Wuxia	
The Incorruptible	Barry Lee	Ray Lui, Simon Yam, Waise Lee, Tommy Wong. Anita Yuen, Carrie Ng, Lau Siu Ming	Crime	
Insanity	Tony Leung Siu Hung	Simon Yam, Kathy Chow, Raymond Wong	Horror	
Iron Monkey	Yuen Woo Ping	Donnie Yen, Yu Rongguang, Jean Wang, Tsang Sze Man, Yuen Shun-Yi	Wuxia	
The Killer's Love	Jamie Luk	Simon Yam, Carol Cheng	Action / Romantic comedy	
Kung Fu Cult Master	Wong Jing	Jet Li, Sharla Cheung, Sammo Hung, Chingmy Yau, Gigi Lai	Wuxia	
Last Hero in China	Wong Jing	Jet Li, Sharla Cheung, Dicky Cheung, Bryan Leung, Anita Yuen, Natalis Chan	Action / Martial arts / Comedy	
Legend of the Liquid Sword	Wong Jing	Aaron Kwok, Anita Yuen		
Love Among the Triad	Andy Chin	Simon Yam, Cecilia Yip, Veronica Yip, Wan Yeung-ming, Rosamund Kwan, Pauline Wong	Crime	
Love Is a Fairy Tale				
The Mad Monk	Johnnie To	Stephen Chow, Maggie Cheung, Ng Man-tat, Anthony Wong, Wong Yat-fei	Comedy / Fantasy	
The Magic Crane	Benny Chan	Tony Leung, Anita Mui, Rosamund Kwan, Damian Lau	Wuxia	
Man of the Times	Taylor Wong	Ray Lui, Yu Li, Ng Man-tat, Deanie Ip, Kent Cheng, Veronica Yip, Bowie Lam, Irene Wan, Kwan Hoi-san	Mystery	
Millionaire Cop				Copyright notice: 1992.
A Moment of Romance II	Benny Chan	Aaron Kwok, Jacklyn Wu, Roger Kwok, Anthony Wong	Romance	
Once a Cop	Stanley Tong	Michelle Yeoh, Yu Rongguang, Wakin Chau, Athena Chu, Louis Fan, Bowie Lam, Jackie Chan, Bill Tung, Eric Tsang, Dick Wei	Action	
Once Upon a Time in China III	Tsui Hark	Jet Li, Rosamund Kwan, Max Mok	Kung fu	
Perfect Exchange	Wong Jing	Andy Lau, Tony Leung, Christy Chung, Natalis Chan, Kingdom Yuen	Comedy	
Pink Bomb	Derek Chiu	Waise Lee, Lau Ching-wan, Cynthia Khan, Loletta Lee, Gloria Yip, Dayo Wong	Action, Comedy	
The Prince of Portland Street	Nelson Cheung	Simon Yam, Dicky Cheung, Anita Yuen, Sarah Lee, Tommy Wong	Crime	
Raped by an Angel	Wong Jing	Chingmy Yau, Simon Yam, Jacqueline Ng, Mark Cheng	Crime	
Rose Rose I Love You	Jacky Pang	Tony Leung, Carina Lau, Kenny Bee, Simon Yam, Veronica Yip, Bowie Lam	Comedy	
Remains of a Woman	Clarence Fok	Carrie Ng, James Pax, Loletta Lee, Jacqueline Law	Drama, Crime, Thriller	
Run and Kill	Billy Tang	Kent Cheng, Simon Yam, Melvin Wong, Danny Lee, Esther Kwan, Lily Li	Crime	
Shadow Cop	Albert Lai Gin-Kwok	Carina Lau, Waise Lee	Crime	
The Sword Stained with Royal Blood	Cheung Hoi-Ching	Yuen Biao, Yip Chuen-Chan, Sharla Cheung, Danny Lee Sau-Yin, Anita Yuen, Elizabeth Lee	Wuxia	
The Spirit of Love	Jamie Luk	Loletta Lee, Vincent Lam Wai, Poon Jan-Wai	Romantic / Erotic / Drama / Horror / Fantasy	
Tai Chi Master	Yuen Woo-ping	Jet Li, Michelle Yeoh	Action / Martial arts	
Tom, Dick and Hairy	Lee Chi Ngai, Peter Chan	Tony Leung Chiu-Wai, Tony Leung Ka-fai, Lawrence Cheng, Michael Chow, Ann Bridgewater, Anita Yuen, Jay Lau, Athena Chu, Vivian Chow	Comedy	
Untold Story	Danny Lee	Danny Lee	true crime	
Warriors: The Black Panther	Clarence Fok	Alan Tang, Brigitte Lin, Tony Leung, Simon Yam, Dicky Cheung, Carrie Ng, Yuen Wah	Action	
