= 13th Hong Kong Film Awards =

1994 Hong Kong Film Awards

- Date: 22 April 1994
- Hosted by: Lydia Shum and John Sham

The 13th Hong Kong Film Awards ceremony, honored the best films of 1993 and took place on 22 April 1994 at Hong Kong Academy for Performing Arts, Wan Chai, Hong Kong. The ceremony was hosted by Lydia Shum and John Sham, during the ceremony awards are presented in 17 categories.

== Awards ==
Winners are listed first, highlighted in boldface, and indicated with a double dagger (‡).

**Best Film**: **C'est la vie, mon chéri**‡; Crime Story; Tom, Dick and Hairy; Temptation of A Monk; Always on My Mind	**Best Director**: **Derek Yee — C'est la vie, mon chéri**‡; Peter Chan and Lee Chi Ngai — Tom, Dick and Hairy; Clara Law — Temptation of A Monk; Cha Chuen Yee — Legal Innocence; Kirk Wong — Crime Story
**Best Screenplay**: **Derek Yee — C'est la vie, mon chéri**‡; Lee Chi Ngai — Yesteryou Yesterme Yesterday; James Yuen — Always on My Mind; Lee Chi-ngai, James Yuen and Chan Hing-ka — Tom, Dick and Hairy; Chung Kai Cheung, Jason Lam and Chung Oi Fan — Legal Innocence; Johnny Mak Tong Hung & Stephen Shiu — Lord of the East China Sea	**Best Actor**: **Anthony Wong — The Untold Story**‡; Wu Hsing-kuo — Temptation of A Monk; Sean Lau — C'est la vie, mon chéri; Jackie Chan — Crime Story; Sean Lau — Thou Shalt Not Swear
**Best Actress**: **Anita Yuen — C'est la vie, mon chéri**‡; Josephine Siao — Always on My Mind; Veronica Yip — Roof with a View; Josephine Siao — Fong Sai Yuk; Carrie Ng — Remains of a Woman	**Best Supporting Actor**: **Paul Chun — C'est la vie, mon chéri**‡; Elvis Tsui — All Men Are Brothers: Blood of the Leopard; Kent Cheng — Crime Story; Anthony Wong — Legal Innocence; Michael Lee — Temptation of A Monk; Lawrence Cheng — Tom, Dick and Hairy
**Best Supporting Actress**: **Fung Bo Bo — C'est la vie, mon chéri**‡; Carrie Ng —C'est la vie, mon chéri; Law Lan — Thou Shalt Not Swear; Deanie Ip — Murder; Veronica Yip — Love Among the Triad	**Best New Performer**: **Wu Hsing-kuo — Temptation of A Monk**‡; Jennifer Chan — Thou Shalt Not Swear; Cherie Chan — Three Summers; Jay Lau — Days of Tomorrow; John Tang — Yesteryou Yesterme Yesterday
**Best Film Editing**: **Peter Cheung — Crime Story**‡; Patrick Tam and Kai Kit Wai — Days of Tomorrow; David Wu Dai Wai — The Bride with White Hair; Peter Cheung — Fong Sai Yuk; Marco Mak and Angie Lam — Once Upon a Time in China III	**Best Cinematography**: **Peter Pau — The Bride with White Hair**‡; Bill Wong — Roof with a View; David Chung, Peter Ngor — Finale in Blood; Andrew Lesnie and Arthur Wong — Temptation of A Monk; Arthur Wong — Days of Tomorrow
**Best Art Direction**: **Eddie Ma — The Bride with White Hair**‡; Bill Lui — Green Snake; James Leung — Days of Tomorrow; Yee Chung-Man — C'est la vie, mon chéri; Timmy Yip, Yang Zhanjia and Lee Wai Ming — Temptation of A Monk	**Best Costume Make Up Design**: **Emi Wada and Tenny Cheung — The Bride with White Hair**‡; William Chang and Chiu Kwok Chun — The East Is Red; Dora Ng — C'est la vie, mon chéri; William Chang and Ng Po Ling — Green Snake; Timmy Yip and Lee Wai Ming — Temptation of A Monk; Bruce Yu — The Heroic Trio
**Best Action Direction**: **Corey Yuen and Yuen Tak — Fong Sai Yuk**‡; Yuen Bun — Once Upon a Time in China III; Tony Ching — The Heroic Trio; Yuen Wo Ping, Yuen Cheung Yan, Yuen Shun Yee and Ku Huan Chiu —Iron Monkey; Jackie Chan and Jackie Chan Stunt Team — Crime Story	**Best Original Film Score**: **Lau Yee Tat and Tony Wai — Temptation of A Monk**‡; Wong Jim, Mark Lui — Green Snake; Richard Yuen — The Bride with White Hair; Chris Babida — C'est la vie, mon chéri; Wu Wai Lap — The Heroic Trio; Johnny Chen — Love Among the Triad
**Best Original Film Song**: **Composer: Lo Ta-yu • Lyrics: Lin Xi • Singer: Anita Mui — The Heroic Trio**‡; Composer: Leslie Cheung • Lyrics: Lin Xi • Singer: Leslie Cheung — The Bride with White Hair; Composer: Chris Babida • Lyrics: Wong Yuk • Singer: One-Fang — C'est la vie, mon chéri; Composer: Tony Wai • Lyrics: Chan Sau Pok • Singer: Children Chorus — Thou Shalt Not Swear; Composer: Lo Ta-yu • Lyrics: Lin Xi • Singer: Anita Mui — The Heroic Trio	**Professional Achievement**: **Kong Cho-Toi and Si To-On**‡
**Lifetime Achievement**: **Raymond Chow, Bruce Lee and Lai Man-Wai**‡
