= Crime Story (1993 film) =

1993 Hong Kong film by Kirk Wong

- Film poster
- Traditional Chinese: 重案組
- Simplified Chinese: 重案组
- Hanyu Pinyin: Zhōng Àn Zǔ
- Jyutping: Cung5 On3 Zo2
- Directed by: Kirk Wong; Jackie Chan (action); Bruce Law (action)
- Written by: Chun Tin Nam; Chan Man Keung; Chan Lai Lin; Cheung Chi Shing; Teddy Chan
- Produced by: Chua Lam
- Starring: Jackie Chan; Kent Cheng; Law Kar-ying; Blackie Ko; Ken Lo
- Cinematography: Chan Kwong Hung; Ardy Lam; Andrew Lau; Hang-Sang Poon; Arthur Wong
- Edited by: Cheung Yiu Chung
- Music by: Mark Lui; James Wong
- Distributed by: Golden Harvest; Ascot Video
- Release date: 24 June 1993
- Running time: 107 minutes
- Country: Hong Kong
- Languages: Cantonese; Mandarin
- Box office: US$9.32 million

Crime Story (Chinese: 重案組; also known as New Police Story; released in the Philippines as Police Dragon) is a 1993 Hong Kong action film directed by Kirk Wong, and produced by Chua Lam. The film stars Jackie Chan, Kent Cheng, Law Kar-ying, and Puishan Au-yeung. The film was released theatrically in Hong Kong on 24 June 1993.

Unlike most Jackie Chan films, which feature a combination of action and comedy, Crime Story is mostly a serious film. The film is based on actual events surrounding the 1990 kidnapping of Chinese businessman Teddy Wang.

== Plot ==
Inspector Eddie Chan of the Organised Crime and Triad Bureau, who suffers from emotional stress after shooting several men in self-defense, is assigned to track down the kidnapped businessman Wong Yat-fei. The search takes him from Hong Kong to Taiwan, causing him to cross paths with some powerful mobsters. What complicates matters is that one of the kidnappers is operating within the police force, determined to stop Chan from succeeding. The relentlessly driven Chan finds himself fighting his personal demons at the same time he battles the seemingly unending wave of crime in the city.

== Cast ==
- Jackie Chan as Inspector Eddie Chan
- Kent Cheng as Detective Hung Ting-bong
- Law Kar-ying as Wong Yat-fei
- Puishan Au-yeung as Wong Yat-fei's wife
- Blackie Ko as Captain Ko
- Pan Lingling as Psychiatrist
- Christine Ng as Lara
- Chung Fat as Ng Kwok-wah
- Ken Lo as Ng Kwok-yan
- Wan Fat as Simon Ting
- William Tuan as Superintendent Cheung
- Wan Seung-lam as Yen Chi-sheng
- Mars as bank robber (uncredited)
- Chan Tat-kwong as bank robber (uncredited)
- Johnny Cheung as Black Dog
- Wong Chi-wai as Black Dragon (uncredited)
- James Ha as kidnapper / Ting-bong's henchman
- Yu Kwok-lok as kidnapper
- Wong Yiu as kidnapper
- Rocky Lai as Taiwanese gangster / restaurant owner
- Jameson Lam as policeman at construction site
- Leung Gam-san as data centre manager

== Production ==
According to the book I Am Jackie Chan: My Life in Action, written by Jackie Chan, Chan's legs were crushed after getting caught between two cars while filming the opening action scene.

The film is set and was filmed in Hong Kong and Taiwan in 42 days from 9 July to 20 August 1992. The climactic scene, in which a building is decimated by explosions, was filmed in the deserted Kowloon Walled City, which was scheduled for demolition shortly thereafter.

Jet Li was originally considered to play the role of Inspector Eddie Chan, before he turned down the role to do Tai Chi Master instead. The role of Inspector Eddie Chan went to Jackie Chan.

== Release ==
Crime Story was released theatrically in Hong Kong on 24 June 1993. In the Philippines, the film was released as Police Dragon by Moviestars Production on 19 January 1994.

In Japan, the film was premiered as a reboot of the Police Story series under the title 新ポリス・ストーリー (lit. New Police Story), and it was promoted with the Theme Song of the original 1985 film.

After the success of Rumble In The Bronx, Miramax wanted to release Crime Story next in theaters, until Jackie Chan advised against it, so Miramax released Police Story 3: Supercop (1992) instead. The version was released on video and DVD on 18 July 2000 in the United States by Miramax was dubbed in English, although unlike most releases, it contained the original musical score. Chan's character had the name "Eddie" replaced with "Jackie" in the dub. There were four cuts made from the Miramax version:

- The pre-credits sequence with the kidnappers was removed.
- A scene where Wong is dumped overboard.
- The last scene, where Wong Yat-fei's wife tells him to thank Inspector Chan.
- The last scene again where Chan burns Wong's wallet.

The Dragon Dynasty (DD) version has the original Cantonese track and also restored the cuts made in the Miramax version. It was released in 2007 and is about 107 minutes long. It also contains other deleted scenes not seen in either of the previous versions.

Dragon Dynasty released a DVD in the United States on 7 August 2007. On 15 January 2013, Shout! Factory released a DVD and Blu-ray as part of a double feature along with The Protector.

== Box office ==
In Hong Kong, the film grossed HK$27,439,331 (US$3,547,157) at the box office. In Taiwan, it grossed NT$24,851,480 (US$941,994). In Japan, it grossed ¥345 million (US$3,103,000) at the box office. In South Korea, it grossed US$1,530,000. In the United States, the film grossed $194,720.

Crime Story was the ninth highest grossing films in Hong Kong box office in 1993.

== Reception ==
The film holds a 94% approval rating on Rotten Tomatoes based on 15 reviews; the average rating is 6.6/10. Kevin Thomas of the Los Angeles Times called the film "as fast and furious as action pictures get" while praising Chan's dramatic performance. Derek Elley of Variety said that it is stylish and fresh, but Chan "still needs more time with his drama coach". Bill Gibron of Popmatters called it "one of [Chan's] most serious and solidly suspenseful" films. Gibron says the film makes up for its lack of signature acrobatics with "one amazing setpiece after another" during the climax.

Stephen Hunter of The Baltimore Sun included it in 10th place at his year-end list of the best films. At the 1993 Golden Horse Awards, the film won Best Actor (Jackie Chan). At the 13th Hong Kong Film Awards, it won Best Film Editing (Peter Cheung) and was nominated for Best Action Choreography (Jackie Chan), Best Actor (Jackie Chan), Best Director (Kirk Wong), Best Picture, and Best Supporting Actor (Kent Cheng).

== See also ==
- Jackie Chan filmography
- List of Hong Kong films of 1993
- List of Hong Kong films
