= Tom, Dick and Hairy =

1993 Hong Kong film by Lee Chi-ngai and Peter Chan

- Film poster
- Traditional Chinese: 風塵三俠
- Simplified Chinese: 风尘三侠
- Hanyu Pinyin: Fēng Chén Sān Xiá
- Jyutping: Fung1 Can4 Saam1 Hap6
- Directed by: Lee Chi-ngai; Peter Chan
- Screenplay by: James Yuen; Lee Chi-ngai; Chan Hing-ka
- Produced by: Claudie Chung; Gordon Chan
- Starring: Tony Leung Chiu-wai; Tony Leung Ka-fai; Lawrence Cheng
- Cinematography: Bill Wong
- Edited by: Chan Kei-hop
- Music by: Lowell Lo
- Production company: United Filmmakers Organisation
- Distributed by: Newport Entertainment
- Release date: 26 February 1993
- Running time: 94 minutes
- Country: Hong Kong
- Language: Cantonese
- Box office: HK$17,064,766

Tom, Dick and Hairy is a 1993 Hong Kong romantic comedy film directed by Lee Chi-ngai and Peter Chan and starring Tony Leung Chiu-wai, Tony Leung Ka-fai and Lawrence Cheng as the three titular protagonists.

== Plot ==
Tom Chan, Dick Ching and his older cousin Hairy Mo live in the same tenement building but have different love lives. Tom and his girlfriend Joyce are totally harmonic, but nonetheless love has become feelings. Once, looking for lust in a nightclub, Tom meets a stunning PR girl, Cat. The two fall in love, but since Tom's wedding date is getting close, he needs to make a tough decision.

Dick is a playboy who often pursues sex without love. Sometimes at night without a pursuing object, he spends the night with Wai-fong.

At this point, Tom's younger sister, Pearl, returns to Hong Kong from the US and Dick feels lost of Pearl's passion. On the other hand, Dick realizes that he had always loved Wai-fong but she has gone elsewhere when he wants to express his love.

Hairy is a bachelor who meets a divorced man Michelle, who turns out to be a homosexual man. Later, Hairy dates a girl named Francis who strikingly resembles his idol Vivian Chow, an unexpected turn of events for this unbearably lonely man.

== Cast ==
- Tony Leung Chiu-wai as Tom Chan
- Tony Leung Ka-fai as Dick Ching
- Lawrence Cheng as Hairy / Giorgio Mo
- Michael Chow as Michelle
- Ann Bridgewater as Cat
- Anita Yuen as Wai-fong
- Jay Lau as Joyce Lau
- Athena Chu as Pearl Chan
- Vivian Chow as Francis
- Jessica Hsuan as Woman at Restaurant With Dating Group
- Kim Yip as Priest
- Michael Wong as Man on ferry (cameo)
- Wong Wai-kei as Dick's girlfriend 1 (model)
- Yeung Qui-lee as Dick's girlfriend 2
- Cheung Yin-kei as Dick's girlfriend 3 (Japanese girl)
- Lau Chiu-fan as Producer
- Kan Wai-yan as Bride
- Leung Mei-yee as Bridesmaid
- Sze Hiu-lung as Best Man
- Lai Mei-ling as Bank teller
- Simon Cheung as Cat's nightclub customer
- Kwok Si-wing as Joyce's bridal gown tailor
- Lo Wai-ling as Hairy's Blind Date 1
- Vi Vi as Hairy's Blind Date 2
- Cheng Wai-kit as Harry's Blind Date 3
- Chow Tak-ming as Dating Company Staff
- Teddy Chan as Man at Restaurant With Dating Group
- Choi Yue-cheung as Man at Restaurant With Dating Group
- Leung Kai-chi as Joyce's father
- Matthew Link as French restaurant's waiter
- Chan Siu-hung as Groom
- Tse Chi-wah as Electronic goods mover
- Leo as Street Painter
- Yu Ngai-ho as Guest at Dick's Party
- Hui Sze-man as Mamasan

== Box office ==
The film grossed HK$17,064,766 at the Hong Kong box office during its theatrical run from 26 February to 26 March 1993 in Hong Kong.

== Award nominations ==
- 13th Hong Kong Film Awards
  - Nominated: Best Film
  - Nominated: Best Director (Lee Chi-ngai, Peter Chan)
  - Nominated: Best Screenplay (James Yuen, Lee Chi-ngai, Chan Hing-ka)
  - Nominated: Best Supporting Actor (Lawrence Cheng)
