= Cheetah on Fire =

1992 Hong Kong film by Thomas Yip

- Traditional Chinese: 獵豹行動
- Jyutping: lip6 paau3 hang4 dung6
- Directed by: Thomas Yip
- Written by: Hung Hin-pang
- Produced by: Tsui Fat
- Starring: Donnie Yen; Carrie Ng
- Cinematography: Ma Kam-yeung
- Music by: Simon Leung; Tony Tam
- Production company: Cheung Yau Production
- Release date: 1992
- Running time: 84 minutes
- Country: Hong Kong
- Language: Cantonese

Cheetah on Fire (Chinese: 獵豹行動; Jyutping: lip6 paau3 hang4 dung6, released in the Philippines as Fight to Survive) is a 1992 Hong Kong martial arts film directed by Thomas Yip and starring Donnie Yen, Carrie Ng, Sharla Cheung, Gordon Lau, Ken Lo, Eddy Ko, Shing Fui-On, and Michael Woods.

== Cast ==
- Donnie Yen as Ronald
- Carrie Ng as Wu Li-yung
- Sharla Cheung as Peggy
- Gordon Lau as Long Hair
- Ken Lo as Long Hair's man
- Eddy Ko as Fok Chi-kien
- Shing Fui-On as Tong Yiang
- Michael Woods as black thug
- John Salvitti as white thug
- Mark Houghton as Mak

== Release ==
Cheetah on Fire was first released in Hong Kong in 1992. In the Philippines, the film was released as Fight to Survive on 12 November 1992.

=== Home media ===
The film was released on VHS in the United States by Tai Seng Video Marketing in 1998.

On 1 August 2000, the film was released by Universe Laser on VCD in Hong Kong; it has since gone out of print.

== Critical reception ==
In his encyclopedic book about Hong Kong cinema, John Charles gave Cheetah on Fire five out of ten stars, stating that "this low budget effort is packed with action, which helps one to forget just how pedestrian the screenplay is."
