= The Wrath of Silence =

1994 Hong Kong film by Frankie Chan

- Directed by: Frankie Chan
- Starring: Anita Yuen; Takeshi Kaneshiro; Lap-Man Tan; Hoi-Lun Au; Maggie Siu; Wai-Lun Duen; Emily Kwan
- Edited by: Lai-Yee Mak
- Production company: Good Standard International Ltd.
- Distributed by: Gala Film Distribution Limited; Fortune Star Media Limited
- Release date: 8 September 1994; (Hong Kong)
- Running time: 98 min.
- Country: Hong Kong
- Language: Cantonese

The Wrath of Silence is a 1994 Hong Kong comedy film directed by Frankie Chan.

== Cast ==
- Anita Yuen
- Takeshi Kaneshiro
- Lap-Man Tan
- Hoi-Lun Au
- Maggie Siu
- Wai-Lun Duen
- Emily Kwan
