= C'est la vie, mon chéri =

1993 Hong Kong film by Derek Yee

- Film poster

Chinese name
- Traditional Chinese: 新不了情
- Simplified Chinese: 新不了情
Transcriptions
Standard Mandarin
- Hanyu Pinyin: Xīn Bù Liǎo Qíng
Yue: Cantonese
- Jyutping: San1 Bat1 Liu2 Cing4
- Directed by: Derek Yee
- Written by: Derek Yee
- Produced by: Alexander Chan
- Starring: Lau Ching-wan; Anita Yuen; Carina Lau
- Cinematography: Peter Ngor; Tam Tsi-wai
- Edited by: Mei Fung; Eric Kwong
- Music by: Chris Babida; William Wu
- Production company: Film Unlimited Production
- Distributed by: Newport Entertainment
- Release date: 11 November 1993 (Hong Kong)
- Running time: 105 minutes
- Country: Hong Kong
- Language: Cantonese
- Box office: HK$30.85 million

C'est la vie, mon chéri (lit. 'That's life, my love') (Chinese: 新不了情) is a 1993 Hong Kong melodrama film directed by Derek Yee. The film stars Anita Yuen as Min who is part of a Cantonese street opera troupe who meets Kit, a struggling jazz musician. They do slowly just start to form a relationship with Kit gaining acceptance from Min's family, when Min is suddenly diagnosed with bone cancer, an ailment she had previously suffered with as a child.

David Bordwell said that near the beginning of the 1990s, filmmakers in Hong Kong began a cycle of "relationship movies", which featured films with less pricy actors and actresses, sentimental scripts, and lyrical film scores that could be marketed to the music market. Derek Elley wrote in 1994 that C'est la vie, mon chéri was "the year's biggest critical success", and that it was among the top five highest grossing Hong Kong films of 1993. Elley continued that at the 13th Hong Kong Film Awards, it won "nearly all the major awards", which included Yee winning for Best Director, the Best Film award, Best Screenplay and Anita Yuen winning Best Actress.

== Plot ==
Min, who is part of a Cantonese street opera troupe and a part-time cover artist, meets Kit, a struggling jazz musician who has just broken up with his celebrity singer girlfriend. Through her bubbly personality, she affects Kit for the better. However, just as their relationship begins to stabilize and win acceptance from Min's family, which includes a strict mother and a doting, saxophone-playing uncle, Min is re-diagnosed with bone cancer, which she had once suffered as a child.

== Cast and roles ==
- Lau Ching-wan as Kit
- Anita Yuen as Min
- Carina Lau as Tracey
- Paul Chun as Uncle / Cheung Po-tsai
- Fung Bo Bo as Min's mother
- Carrie Ng as Yau Ling
- Sylvia Chang as Min's doctor (cameo)
- Jacob Cheung as Fortune teller (cameo)
- David Wu
- Peter Chan as Cocktail party attendee (cameo)
- Teddy Chan as Man sitting at bar
- Tats Lau as Tats
- Herman Yau as Kit's musician friend
- Joe Junior as Cover singer
- Joe Cheung as Bartender
- Chin Tsi-ang as Min's granny

== Background and production ==
In 1960s Hong Kong films, there was a trend of films about a songstress who becomes is a self-sacrificing and becomes a tragic figure. This was seen in early films like The Wild, Wild Rose (1960), Love Without End (1961), with the latter big a big hit and earning Linda Lin her fourth and final Best Actress Awards at the Asian Film Festival in Seoul, South Korea in 1962. The latter film influenced director Derek Yee. The Chinese-language title of C'est la vie mon cheri is 新不了情 which literally translates as "New Love Without End" and a similar narrative to the 1962 film.

In his book Planet Hong Kong, David Bordwell said that near the beginning of the 1990s, filmmakers in Hong Kong began a cycle of "relationship movies" which featured less pricy stars, sentimental scripts and were devoid of special effects, and also contained lyrical film scores that could be marketed to the music market. He continued that these films ranged from what he described as "low-key yuppie romances" such as Heart to Hearts (1988) to "wistful melodramas" such as Derek Yee's C'est la vie, mon chéri.

== Release and reception ==
C'est la vie, mon chéri was released on 11 November 1993 in Hong Kong. Derek Elley wrote that C'est la vie, mon chéri was "the year's biggest critical success" in Hong Kong and was a "strong performer at the box-office." Itt earned 30.85 million Hong Kong dollars in 1993 and was among the top five highest grossing films in the country's year-end box office.

Elley wrote that the film "skirts very close to a disease-of-the-week weepie" while finding that it was a "remarkable for its lack of cynicism and crowd-pleasing elements."

In the monthly Chinese magazine Popular Cinema had their annual Hundred Flowers Awards, which were voted for by the magazines readers. Derek Yee was voted "best Director" and Anita Yuen was voted Best Actress for their work in the film. In 2010, both contemporary and former research officers and programmers of the Hong Kong Film Archive as well as the Director of the Hong Kong International Film Festival and the dean of School of Film & Television at the Hong Kong Academy for Performing Arts submitted a list of the 100 Must-See Hong Kong Movies. C'est la vie mon chéri was included on the top 100 list.

=== Awards and nominations ===
Elley said that at the 13th Hong Kong Film Awards, C'est la vie, mon chéri nearly won all the "major prizes".

Award	Date of ceremony	Category	Recipient(s)	Result	Ref.
Golden Horse Film Festival	December 4, 1993	Best Director	Derek Yee	Nominated	
Golden Horse Film Festival	December 4, 1993	Best Original Screenplay	Derek Yee	Nominated	
Golden Horse Film Festival	December 4, 1993	Best Actress	Anita Yuen	Nominated	
Golden Horse Film Festival	December 4, 1993	Best Supporting Actor	Paul Chun	Nominated	
Golden Horse Film Festival	December 4, 1993	Best Supporting Actress	Fung Bo Bo	Nominated	
Golden Horse Film Festival	December 4, 1993	Best Original Film Score	Chris Babida, William Wu	Nominated	
Hong Kong Film Award	April 22, 1994	Best Film	C'est la vie, mon chéri	Won	
Hong Kong Film Award	April 22, 1994	Best Director	Derek Yee	Won	
Hong Kong Film Award	April 22, 1994	Best Screenplay	Derek Yee	Won	
Hong Kong Film Award	April 22, 1994	Best Actor	Lau Ching-wan	Nominated	
Hong Kong Film Award	April 22, 1994	Best Actress	Anita Yuen	Won	
Hong Kong Film Award	April 22, 1994	Best Supporting Actor	Paul Chun	Won	
Hong Kong Film Award	April 22, 1994	Best Supporting Actress	Fung Bo Bo	Won	
Hong Kong Film Award	April 22, 1994	Best Supporting Actress	Carrie Ng	Nominated	
Hong Kong Film Award	April 22, 1994	Best Art Direction	Yee Chung-Man	Nominated	
Hong Kong Film Award	April 22, 1994	Best Costume Makeup Design	Dora Ng	Nominated	
Hong Kong Film Award	April 22, 1994	Best Original Film Music	Chris Babida	Nominated	
Hong Kong Film Award	April 22, 1994	Best Original Film Song	Song: C'est la vie, mon chéri (新不了情) Composer: Chris Babida; Lyricist: Wong Yuk; Singer: One-Fang	Nominated	

== Soundtrack ==
- One-Fang: 新不了情 "C'est la vie, mon chéri"
- Fung Bo Bo: 念情 "Remembering Love"
- Film score: 晨街 "Morning Street"
- Film score: 憶兒時 "Childhood Memories"
- Lee Fung: 搖紅燭 "Shaking the Red Candle"
- One-Fang: 給我一個吻 "Give Me a Kiss"
- One-Fang: 不了情 "Endless Love"
- Film score: 愛芽初萌 "Shoots of a Budding Love"
- Film score: In The Mood
- Joe Junior, Louise Tang: 載歌載舞（詐肚痛） "Singing and Dancing (Feigning Abdominal Pain)" (Cantonese)
- Lee Fung: 補鑊佬 "Remedial guy" (Cantonese)
- Film score: 返家 "Back Home"
- Fung Bo Bo: 黎明在望 "Dawn Is in Sight" (Cantonese)

== Legacy ==
Lisa Odham wrote in her book Historical Dictionary of Hong Kong Cinema (2007) that while the Hong Kong melodrama genre declined in the 1970s as kung fu films superseded it locally, it was revived by critical and commercial success of C'est la vie, mon chéri. Elley wrote in 1994 that C'est la vie, mon chéri' made Anita Yuen a star actress, while Richard James of the South China Morning Post described the film as her "big break." On winning her Best Actress award at the Hong Kong Film Awards, Yuen felt it was not deserved saying "I am not ready to win; I haven’t gathered enough points. Even if other people feel I am ready for it, I personally don’t think so. In a few years, when I am more mature, I can probably give better performances." Havis said following the win, Yuen was "not very choose about her roles" with sights set on "to make as much money as possible while at the top."

The theme song of (新不了情; Xīn bùliǎo qíng) is sung by singer One-Fang. It grew to be one of her most popular song and was subsequently covered by many others.

In 2008, Derek Yee produced a television adaptation of C'est la vie, mon chéri, starring Chen Kun, Fiona Sit, Alex Fong, Candice Yu, and Benz Hui.

== See also ==
- List of Hong Kong films of 1993
