= God of Gamblers 3: The Early Stage =

1996 Hong Kong film by Wong Jing

- DVD cover
- Directed by: Wong Jing
- Written by: Wong Jing
- Produced by: Wong Jing
- Starring: Leon Lai; Anita Yuen; Jordan Chan; Gigi Leung; Francis Ng
- Cinematography: Arthur Wong
- Edited by: Marco Mak
- Music by: Peter Kam; Duck Lau; Lin Che-Yeung
- Distributed by: Golden Harvest Company; BoB and Partners Co. Ltd.
- Release date: 14 December 1996 (Hong Kong)
- Running time: 110 minutes
- Country: Hong Kong
- Language: Cantonese

God of Gamblers 3: The Early Stage (Chinese: 賭神三之少年賭神) is a 1996 Hong Kong action-comedy film written, produced and directed by Wong Jing and starring Leon Lai, Anita Yuen, Jordan Chan, Gigi Leung and Francis Ng. It is the prequel to the original God of Gamblers film starring Chow Yun-fat, and should not be mistaken with the Stephen Chow film God of Gamblers III: Back to Shanghai.

== Film synopsis ==
Leon Lai plays Ko Chun, a young orphan under the tutelage of Kent (Chung King Fai), a veteran gambler. Ko Chun acquires his future legendary gambling skills from his mentor, while trying to claim the title as the God of Gamblers, but he is nearly murdered by Kent before he goes to win the final round and lapses into a coma.

Ko Chun is eventually aided by his childhood friend, Seven (Anita Yuen) and her friends So (Cheung Tat Ming) and Lung Wu (Jordan Chan), a highly trained ex-soldier, who eventually becomes Ko Chun's bodyguard.

Meanwhile, Ko Chun's rival, Ko Ngo (Francis Ng), gains the title as the God of Gamblers.

== Plot ==
Ko Chun came from a rich and affluent family and was taken care of by his nanny. One day in 1969, the nanny was gambling and as she just put her jade ring down as a bet, the banker of the gambling den, Tai-Chin, created a ruse that the police is coming and ran away with the ring and other bet in the chaos. While running away, Tai-Chin's daughter, Seven, tripped and fell but Ko Chun pushed her away from further danger. Ko Chun, however, was kidnapped by some child kidnapper and was about to have his hands chopped off so he can become a beggar and beg for money, Kent stepped in and offered to buy Ko Chun while also bringing another child that he had bought at the same place, Ko Ngo to take down the child kidnapper and thus, Ko Chun became Kent's adopted son and also, student in the arts of gambling.

Years later, in 1986, Seven has grown up and So told her that he brought a Vietnamese friend, Lung Wu, along to meet her and told her that her dad had found a way in the Central district to cheat some money off some poor guys in a gambling scheme. Just before they left the mahjong parlour, a gangster Mothball that Seven had offended earlier brought a couple of men to trash the place and also harm her. However, Lung Wu caught it early and as a payback for the ten bowls of Char Siew rice he ate off Seven's generosity, Lung Wu single-handedly beat every gangster to the ground with just a vinyl tape that he snapped into half and use it as a makeshift shiv. After fighting them down, Lung Wu, Seven and So left for Central. When they arrived, Seven instantly recognized Kent and Ko Chun but initially kept silent about it. After Kent left the table, he asked Ko Chun to substitute him in. However, it was a ruse as the others thought that Kent was losing but the cards Ko Chun opened turned out to be a Three of a Kind which beats the nearest Pair of Ks. Enraged, the banker of the table sent men to chase after Kent and his posse when they leave. As Ko Chun was leaving, he glanced upon Seven and noticed the jade ring she had around her neck was what his nanny had pawned during the earlier gambling scene and tend to recognize Seven as the little girl but did not say anything and left. Sensing something was wrong, Seven dispatched Lung Wu to shadow Ko Chun and make sure he suffers no injury. Lung Wu shadowed Ko Chun into the subway train and soon, both started to fight in the train for 1 minute. After no one could be declared the winner, both agreed that it's a draw and both started befriending each other then.

Weeks later, Kent told Ko Chun that there's an international "God of Gamblers" tournament in Macau and he wants the whole team to be there including Ko Ngo and his daughter, Hing, to support Ko Chun in the competition to win as the "God of Gamblers" with the prize being the owner of all of Asia's casino. Already knowing how well Lung Wu fights, Ko Chun went to find Lung Wu for extra support and Lung Wu agreed. Seven and Ko Chun both recognized each other immediately and reminisce their encounter when they were young and Ko Chun soon left the house and went to Macau for the competition. Just before the second round of competition begins, Kent passed him a discreet item that was actually a gun that can't be detected by any metal detectors. During the second round of competition, only Ko Chun and Ko Ngo were left at the table. Ko Chun knew his card were bigger than Ko Ngo and cannot fathom why Ko Ngo would continue betting despite losing, he questions Kent on the reasons why while both are in the toilet. However, Kent shows his true colours as he was actually a big bookie that was hedging on Ko Chun's loss and told Ko Chun to lose. However, Ko Chun did not parlay and insisted on winning. Out of options, Kent lured Ko Chun into a hug and promised him that Ko Chun could do whatever he wants only to see himself get shot by the same kind of gun that Kent gave him into the side of his brain. As Ko Chun collapsed, he realized that the one that killed his dad was actually Kent due to the words his mother had told him: "I have seen the killer and the man is mental to be able to laugh consistently even when he kills a man".

Miraculously, Ko Chun managed to survive the gunshot wound and fell into a coma for almost 3 month. While during that time, Ko Ngo became the "God of Gambler" and took Hing as his wife. Seven, So and Lung Wu has been taking of him in the hospital while he was still in a delirious state after awaking, constantly having flashbacks of the shooting. He even refused to eat and entered "shutdown mode" locking himself from all sort of communication. He even refused to eat till Lung Wu stuffed dark chocolates into his mouth to ensure he has the energy after refusing to eat for 3 days and somehow, ended up enjoying it and finishing the whole box. Lung Wu soon found out that the outside world, including his rival Ko Ngo, knew that Ko Chun isn't actually dead and being in a hospital could pose as a danger to Ko Chun thus, they moved him to Seven's house where Seven took good care of him. While taking care of him, Ko Chun opened up finally and guarantees that he will be able to make a comeback. With that guarantee that Ko Chun is already has a stable mind, Seven went to her dad's mahjong parlor to borrow money from Tai-Chin but along the way to the parlor, So revealed that Tai-Chin had actually owed Mothball a lot of money and could not lend Seven the money but when they reach the parlor, Mothball was already in the parlor while pinning Tai-Chin with his feet. To wriggle out of the situation, So blurted out that the God of Gambler is actually the future husband of Seven and Mothball instantly threatened So to bring the God of Gambler to him or else Tai-Chin, Seven and himself would be shot dead. When So reached the house, Ko Ngo was already in the house goading Ko Chun. Ko Chun initially showed close to no response but after watching and hearing from Ko Ngo that he had actually married Hing and actually got her pregnant, he got enraged which aggravated the wound and slowly lost his sense of thought and became slightly retarded. Not wanting to land everyone in trouble, So still brought the now-retarded Ko Chun to the mahjong parlor in a wig to disguise him as the God of Gambler. Despite being retarded, Ko Chun never lost his skill in cheating nor gambling and instead won all 3 rounds against Mothball through cheating. Enraged, Mothball started and his men started to whack So for lying to them but it turned out that the guy they were beating was Lung Wu disguising as So. Lung Wu flipped the situation and fought every of Mothball's men down including Mothball himself.

When they reached home, the doctor had officially declared Ko Chun mentally unstable. However, the whole house was bugged by Ko Ngo and Kent. Fearing that Ko Chun might just be feigning to be retarded and ruin Ko Ngo's plan for yet another upcoming competition, they orchestrated Ko Chun's kidnapping and succeeded. However, Lung Wu witnessed it and stopped Seven for calling the police realizing that the ploy was to prevent Ko Chun from entering the 2nd "God of Gamblers" competition in Macau yet again and vowed to get Ko Chun out from Ko Ngo's hand. In Macau, Ko Ngo was just introduced to be the representative for Hong Kong but soon after, Seven, Lung Wu, So and Tai-Chin arrived and Lung Wu instantly went up on stage and berate Ko Ngo. Just then, Ko Chun arrived his presence. Turns out, his "kidnapping" was a ruse to confuse Ko Ngo as he did not become a retard after all and had always been in contact with the Australian side that were also competing and agreed to be their representative while also being protected by the FBI.

While in the new safehouse, Ko Chun deduced that due to Kent knowing his prowess, Kent himself have zero confidence that Ko Chun would actually lose and due to the way Kent has been handling things, he would surely send assassins to claim Ko Chun's life. Just as Ko Chun predicted, Kent sent a bunch of Vietnamese assassins to wipe out the whole safehouse estate of guards and also to claim Ko Chun's life. While the assassins were dealing with the Caucasian guards around the premise, Tai-Chin was awaken by the constant loud thuds he was hearing. Curious, he opened the balcony and have a peek of was going on before being slashed in the throat by the lead assassin before being left for death. While Lung Wu was fighting those nearest to him, Tai-Chin crawled to the nearest assassin facing Ko Chun and Seven and bit the assassin in the leg with his last breath before being shot by the said assassin. Both Seven and Ko Chun split in the chaos with Lung Wu finally arriving beside Ko Chun's side. When Lung Wu, Ko Chun and So met, they heard noises on the roof and rushed up only to find the lead assassin had already tied Seven up and threatened to push her down while challenging both Lung Wu and Ko Chun to a fight. Ko Chun stepped out of the door and agreed to fight the assassin. However, the assassin turned his gun and tried to fire a shot at Ko Chun only to have Lung Wu throwing a dagger at his firing arm which caused him too lose his grip on Seven and Seven fell off the ledge. Ko Chun tried to save Seven but missed and Lung Wu held Ko Chun tight to prevent him from falling too but got stabbed in the back. So took a plastic chair and smashed it against the assassin while Ko Chun and Lung Wu recovered from their position and both simultaneously attacking the assassin till Ko Chun kicked him off the roof and fell to his death.

Before the competition. it was revealed that Seven actually did not die from the fall but was in a comatose state and requiring apparatuses to keep her alive. Ko Chun requested to see her and not wanting her to suffer, he hugged her for the last time, kissed her forehead and turned off her oxygen mask to put her out of the suffering and left for the competition. During the competition, Ko Chun folded every round and never placed a bet. Till the final round as things were heated up, he asked for the cards to be covered. Hing revealed her support for Ko Chun with bank bonds worth $30 Million dollars for the side bet between Ko Chun and Ko Ngo. On top of the side bet, Ko Ngo, feeling arrogant that he would win, raised the stake to even bet on each other's hand which Ko Chun agrees to. As the competition resumes, it revealed that Hing was actually lying to Ko Chun that she had switched her allegiance and her intention was to switch cards away from Ko Chun which allow Ko Ngo to gain Ko Chun's 10 of Hearts to beat him with a Straight Flush. However, Ko Chun already predicted it and when both showed their hands, it's revealed that Ko Chun had all along knew about the cheats Ko Ngo and Hing was doing together with the one-eyed man behind him giving out instructions of Ko Chun's cards. To counter that, he had corners of Hearts cards all in his ring and used it to cover up the corner of his base card to trick the one-eyed man behind and sensing Hing wasn't sincere, he purposely let Hing swapped his card as even with the swap, Ko Chun won with a Three of a Kind with 2's while all Ko Ngo had was an Ace High (if the swapped card was the 10 of Hearts, which Ko Chun had fooled the one-eyed man into believing Ko Chan had, Ko Ngo would have won but Ko Chun's base card was actually a 3 of Clubs).

With no more options left and to honor the bet, Lung Wu took out an axe and chopping board to allow Ko Ngo to honour and chop off his hand. Pleading for Kent's help, Kent instead just turns around and live with Ko Chun backing up that Ko Ngo had been fooled into thinking that Kent treats him like a treasure but Kent actually dispose him because he's useless now. Enraged, Ko Ngo took the axe and chased after the leaving Kent. Kent turned around and tries to shoot Ko Ngo with the concealed gun only to realize at the last minute that the gun has been switched to a lipstick by So on the orders of Ko Chun and helplessly gets chopped to death by Ko Ngo. Wanting to exact revenge, Ko Ngo instantly flipped around and charged towards Ko Chun but Lung Wu disposed him with a flying kick while the rest of the guards surrounding the venue subdues him.

== Cast ==
- Leon Lai as Ko Chun
- Anita Yuen as Seven
- Jordan Chan as Lung Wu
- Gigi Leung as Kent Hing
- Francis Ng as Ko Ngo
- Chung King-fai as Kent
- Cheung Tat-ming as So
- Elvis Tsui as Tai-Chin
- Collin Chou as Killer
- Brian Kwok as Young Ko Chun
