= The Days of Being Dumb =

1992 Hong Kong film by Blackie Ko

- Traditional Chinese: 亞飛與亞基
- Simplified Chinese: 亚飞与亚基
- Hanyu Pinyin: Yǎ Fēi Yú Yǎ Jī
- Jyutping: Ngaa3 Fei1 Jyu2 Ngaa3 Gei1
- Directed by: Blackie Ko
- Written by: Joe Ma; James Yuen; Cheung Chi-sing
- Produced by: Peter Chan
- Starring: Tony Leung; Jacky Cheung; Eric Tsang; Kent Tong; Anita Yuen
- Cinematography: Jingle Ma; Andrew Lau; Tony Miu
- Edited by: Chan Kei-hop
- Music by: Richard Lo
- Production companies: United Filmmakers Organisation; Movie Impact
- Distributed by: Warner Bros.
- Release date: 6 August 1992
- Running time: 92 minutes
- Country: Hong Kong
- Language: Cantonese
- Box office: HK$9,883,635

The Days of Being Dumb (Chinese: 亞飛與亞基; lit. 'Fei and Gei') is a 1992 Hong Kong comedy film produced by Peter Chan, directed by Blackie Ko and starring Tony Leung Chiu-wai, Jacky Cheung, Eric Tsang (who also serves as the film's presenter), Kent Tong, and actress Anita Yuen in her debut role.

== Plot ==
Fred and Keith are childhood friends who dream of being triad members. As they become adults, they achieve their dream and join many different gangs. However, each time they join a new gang, the gang boss dies shortly afterwards. The two are considered jinxes and no gangs want to take them in. The two then depend on themselves to do business and get a prostitute from Singapore, Jane. Jane, however, believes she was supposed to be a model and the two of them do not have the courage to put her to work. Jane is also later found out to be a lesbian. Later, famous triad leader Kwan comes and takes Fred and Keith in to prove to people that he is invulnerable to their jinx. Under Kwan, the two manage to become triad heroes. However, later things go wrong and Kwan is turned against the two and they must strike back to protect themselves.

== Cast ==
- Tony Leung as Fred Tung
- Jacky Cheung as Keith
- Eric Tsang as Ball
- Kent Tong as Kwan
- Anita Yuen as Jane
- Jamie Luk as Slim
- Yeung Wan-king as hoodlum tenant
- Chu Tau as hoodlum tenant
- Cheng Tai-kim as hoodlum tenant
- Tania Wong as Lisa
- Chan Chi-fai as Piggy
- Wong Hung as Brother Nine
- Glen Chin as General Lee
- Tam Wai as Iron
- Lam Chung as gangster (uncredited cameo)
- Billy Ching as Gold Teeth Shing
- Chun Kwai-po as Teeth's gangster
- Cheung Ying-wa as car jockey
- Wan Kung-wai as car jockey
- Chan Leung-shun as car jockey
- Ben Luk as Mr. Lau
- Leung Kei-hei as Keith's dad
- Wan Seung-yin as Keith's 2nd aunt
- Lee Chi-hang as young Keith
- William Chu as young Fred
- Simon Cheung as policeman in theatre
- Yeung Kei-sing as policeman in theatre
- Garry Chan as Big Mouth Cheong
- Sam Dang as Kwan's thug
- Ng Piu-chuen as Kwan's thug
- Mike Lau as Kwan's thug
- Chang Yuk-chuen as Kwan's thug
- Au Chiu-hang as Kwan's thug
- Ng Yuk-sau as Kwan's thug
- Wong Ying-kit as Little Kit
- Fung Yuen-chi as Lau Pei
- Tsui Kai-wah as long hair passerby
- Szeto Bobby as rascal
- So Chung as rascal
- Cheung Sam-po as rascal
- Or Wai-man as female TV reporter
- Sam Kin-sang as policeman
- To Kwan-pang as hawker
- Tse Chi-wah as watermelon hawker
- Wong Yun-ching as fat boy student
- Four Tse as funeral attendee
- Leung Kai-chi as Pei's gangster
- Ho Chi-moon as Kwan's gangster in theatre
- Kent Chow

== Box office ==
This film grossed HK$9,883,635 during its theatrical run from 6 August to 26 August 1992 in Hong Kong.

== Award ==
Award
Ceremony	Category	Recipient	Outcome
12th Hong Kong Film Awards	Best New Performer	Anita Yuen	Won
