= 01:00 A.M. =

1995 Hong Kong film by Wilson Yip

- Poster with the alternative title Who Is Calling Me at Midnight?

Chinese name
- Traditional Chinese: 夜半1點鐘
Transcriptions
Yue: Cantonese
- Jyutping: Je^{6} Bun^{3} Jat^{7} Dim^{2} Zung^{1}
- Directed by: Wilson Yip
- Screenplay by: Philip Kwok; So Man-Sing
- Produced by: Andy Chin Wing-keung
- Cinematography: Adam Tam Chi-wai
- Edited by: Kam Ma
- Music by: Tommy Wai Kai-leung
- Production company: Newscope Productions Limited
- Release date: 2 June 1995 (Hong Kong)
- Running time: 86 minutes
- Country: Hong Kong
- Language: Cantonese

01:00 A.M. (Chinese: 夜半1點鐘; Jyutping: Je^{6} Bun^{3} Jat^{7} Dim^{2} Zung^{1}), also known as Who Is Calling Me at Midnight? (半夜誰叩我), is a 1995 Hong Kong horror anthology film directed by Wilson Yip. The three segments in the anthology are "Coma Patient", "The Girl with the Braid", and "Snapshot".

== Plot ==
=== "Coma Patient" ===
Famous singer Sunny Wong is in a coma, with numerous fans of his as well as photographers waiting outside the coma ward clamoring to see him. Every night at 1:00 A.M., a nurse on duty sees the ghosts of the coma patients. The ghost of Sunny asks for her help with the ghost of a girl who fell to her death at one of his concerts and will not let him back into his body because she wants him to stay with her.

=== "The Girl with the Braid" ===
Fong Siu-yin, a psychology student, tries to recall how her leg got broken. She remembers that she became jealous when a fellow student bought a used car, so she went to buy one of her own. Seeking a project for her psychology class, she was encouraged by fellow students to interview the well-known local ghost known as "the girl with the braid".

=== "Snapshot" ===
Two police officers using a radar to catch speeding cars end up catching a mysterious image of a woman walking in the road in one snapshot.

== Cast ==
=== "Coma Patient" ===
- Veronica Yip as Nurse
- Anthony Yiu-Ming Wong as Sunny Wong
- Ivy Leung as Sin (倩)
- Shirley Hung as Ghost

=== "The Girl with the Braid" ===
- Anita Yuen as Fong Siu-yin
- Jessica Hester Hsuan as Student
- Jessica Hester as Student
- Farini Cheung as Student
- Gam-Lun Lee as Kam Lee

=== "Snapshot" ===
- Jordan Chan as Officer #36257
- Elvis Tsui as Officer #663
- Woon-Ling Hau as Granny
- Kin-Ming Chang as Chief Inspector
- Hung Lu as Fortune Teller
- Ankee Leung Chi-on as Truck driver

== Production ==
The segment "Snapshot" was inspired by an actual mysterious photo caught on a police radar camera. The real-life photo was used in the segment in a scene in which the policemen show the radar camera photo to their chief.

== Release ==
The film had a theatrical run in Hong Kong from 2 June 1995 to 28 June 1995.

== Reception ==
The film received generally negative reviews.

Reviewer Kozo of lovehkfilm.com called the film a "Positively mild horror comedy from director Wilson Yip that lacks the payoff to make it more than a minor distraction. Maybe okay for Wilson Yip completists or fans of the stars, but really, this is not a film worth seeking out."

Reviewer Kenneth Brorsson of sogoodreviews.com wrote, "First gig, disposable and mild to the point of sedation, only solid point scored is the use of synch sound."

== Sequels ==
The film was followed by two sequels, 02:00 A.M. (1996) and 03:00 A.M. (1997), both featuring Jordan Chan, who appeared in the segment "Snapshot" in 01:00 A.M.
