= Gunmen (1988 film) =

1988 Hong Kong film by Kirk Wong

- Film poster
- Traditional Chinese: 天羅地網
- Simplified Chinese: 天罗地网
- Hanyu Pinyin: Tiān Luó Dì Wǎng
- Jyutping: Tin1 Lo4 Dei6 Mong2
- Directed by: Kirk Wong
- Screenplay by: Law Kam-fai; Nip Wang-fung
- Produced by: Tsui Hark
- Starring: Tony Leung; Adam Cheng; Waise Lee; Mark Cheng; David Wu; Elvis Tsui; Carrie Ng; Elizabeth Lee
- Cinematography: Andrew Lau; Ardy Lam
- Edited by: David Wu
- Music by: Danny Chung
- Production companies: Golden Princess Films; Film Workshop
- Distributed by: Golden Princess Films
- Release date: 22 October 1988
- Running time: 87 minutes
- Country: Hong Kong
- Language: Cantonese
- Box office: HK$4,825,777

Gunmen is a 1988 Hong Kong action crime drama film produced by Tsui Hark, directed by Kirk Wong and starring Tony Leung, Adam Cheng and Waise Lee. The film was released in Hong Kong theatrically before Hong Kong motion picture rating system took effort; afterwards, the film was rated Category III for the home video release.

== Plot ==
During the Chinese Civil War, a group of war friends Ting Kwan-pik, Cheung, Lau Fuk-kwong and Cheung Cho-fan were captured and brutally tortured by officer Haye. After they escape, Ting headed to Shanghai and became a cop. Ting is also one of the few righteous, incorruptible cops in Shanghai. Although the police force consists mostly of corrupt cops, the superintendent is an honest man. One time during a drug raid, Ting kills Haye's uncle, Leung. Haye, who has now become an opium smuggler, vows of revenge and later kills Ting's partner. Ting also swears revenge, and with nobody else helping, he tracks down his war friends and enlists their help to outlaw opium smuggling.

== Cast ==
- Tony Leung Ka-fai as Ting Kwan-pik
- Adam Cheng as Haye
- Waise Lee as Captain Cheung
- Mark Cheng as Lau Fuk-kwong
- David Wu as Cheung Cho-fan
- Elvis Tsui as Superintendent
- Carrie Ng as Cho Chiu
- Elizabeth Lee as Mona Fong Siu-man
- Andrew Kam as Uncle Leung
- Ho Leng-leng as Sze-sze
- Yuen Bun as Captain Keung
- Wong Kam-kong as Tsou
- Chui Po-lun as Ting Kwan-pik's subordinate
- Cho King-man
- Wong Hung as Fatty
- Stewart Tam as Station Inspector
- Chu Tau as Brother San
- Kam Piu as interpreter for France Ambassador
- Jackson Ng as Haye's thug
- Chiu Kwok-chi as corrupt cop
- James Ha as opium maker
- Lau Fong-sai as Cheung
- Law Kam-fai
- Nip Wang-fung
- Ng Kwok-kin as cop
- Shing Fu-on as Haye's soldier
- Lui Tou-cheung
- Choi Man-hung
- Lung Ying as Hung's thug
- Ho Wing-cheung as Haye's thug
- Kong Long as opium maker
- Tin Kai-man as Haye's thug
- Yeung Sing as Haye's thug
- Lam Tit-ching as Haye's thug
- Ho Chi-moon as Superintendent's assistant
- Hui Sze-man as prostitute
- James M. Crockett as French ambassador

== Box office ==
The film grossed HK$4,825,777 at the Hong Kong box office during its theatrical run from 22 October to 7 November 1988 in Hong Kong.
