= Lam Sheung Mo =

Hong Kong actor (1950–2025)

- Born: 1950
- Died: 4 November 2025 (aged 74–75)

Lam Sheung Mo (born 1950 – 4 November 2025) was a Hong Kong actor.

== Early life and career ==
He grew up in Vietnam, along with two sisters. Throughout his career, he acted in a number of drama series for TVB. He also starred in a number of feature films, including Days of Tomorrow (1993).

In 2005, he was a tutor of the performing arts course of the Hong Kong Performing Arts Association.

== Personal life and death ==
Lam was successfully treated for nasopharyngeal cancer. He died on 4 November 2025, at the age of 75.
