= The Shootout (film) =

1992 Hong Kong film by Michael Mak

- Film poster

Chinese name
- Traditional Chinese: 危險情人
- Simplified Chinese: 危险情人
Transcriptions
Standard Mandarin
- Hanyu Pinyin: Wéi Xiǎn Qíng Rén
Yue: Cantonese
- Jyutping: Ngai4 Him2 Cing4 Jan4
- Directed by: Michael Mak
- Screenplay by: Edward Tang
- Produced by: Jackie Chan
- Starring: Aaron Kwok; Fennie Yuen; Bryan Leung; Sean Lau; Elvis Tsui; Ngai Suet
- Cinematography: Eric Chu
- Edited by: Ng Hung; Peter Cheung
- Music by: Joseph Chan
- Production companies: Golden Harvest Productions; Golden Way Films
- Distributed by: Golden Harvest
- Release date: 27 June 1992
- Running time: 90 minutes
- Country: Hong Kong
- Language: Cantonese
- Box office: HK$3,819,056

The Shootout is a 1992 Hong Kong action film directed by Michael Mak and starring Aaron Kwok, Fennie Yuen, Bryan Leung and Sean Lau.

== Plot ==
Hon (Elvis Tsui), Hei, Koon and Bonnie (Kingdom Yuen) are a group of bank robbers who hijacked an armoured truck. Hon and Hei managed to escape from the cops while Koon and Bonnie encounter rookie cop Wong Ka-fai (Aaron Kwok), whom arrests Koon when he fell off his motorcycle. Knowing that one of his accomplices were arrested, Hon bursts into the police station and murders Koon to prevent divulgence of his crimes.

Since this case is serious, Ka-fai and his colleague Mei-san (Ngai Suet) were transferred to the Regional Crime Unit to assist in investigation, where they collaborate with Inspector Lau (Sean Lau) and Ma (Bryan Leung), whom are frenemies. First, they investigate the armoured truck guards before finding clues that lead them to a karaoke bar, where Ka-fai falls in love with an innocent singer named Man (Fennie Yuen). Soon later, Ka-fai found clues about the hijack case from Man, who turns out to be Hon's girlfriend.

== Cast ==
- Aaron Kwok as Wong Ka-fai
- Fennie Yuen as Man
- Bryan Leung as Inspector Ma
- Sean Lau as Inspector Lau
- Elvis Tsui as Hon
- Ngai Suet as Lee Mei-san
- Kingdom Yuen as Bonnie
- Anderson Junior
- Ng Ching-mau
- Timothy Zao as Robber
- Law Shu-kei as Doctor
- Wong Chung-kui
- Chang Sing-kwong as Policeman
- Ailen Sit as Policeman
- Dion Lam as Policeman
- Simon Cheung as Policeman
- Chow Shing-boh as Pimp
- Fong Li as Pimp
- Wong Man-chun as Policeman

== Reception ==
=== Critical ===
LoveHKFilm gave the film a mixed review noting its uninspiring comedy and lack of plot and developed characters but praises the grittiness of the action scenes.

=== Box office ===
The film grossed HK$3,819,056 at the Hong Kong box office during its theatrical run from 27 June to 3 July 1992.
