= He Ain't Heavy, He's My Father =

1993 Hong Kong film by Peter Chan and Lee Chi-ngai

- Film poster
- Traditional Chinese: 新難兄難弟
- Simplified Chinese: 新难兄难弟
- Hanyu Pinyin: Xīn Nán Xiōng Nán Dì
- Jyutping: San1 Naan4 Hing1 Naan4 Dai6
- Directed by: Peter Chan; Lee Chi-ngai
- Screenplay by: Lee Chi-ngai
- Story by: Ngai Tat-sam; Mang Wai-leung
- Produced by: Peter Chan; Claudie Chung
- Starring: Tony Leung Ka-fai; Tony Leung Chiu-wai; Carina Lau; Anita Yuen; Lawrence Cheng
- Cinematography: Andrew Lau; Tony Miu; Poon Hang-sang; Horace Wong; Ardy Lam
- Edited by: Chan Kei-hop
- Music by: Richard Lo
- Production company: United Filmmakers Organisation
- Distributed by: Newport Entertainment Ltd.
- Release date: 11 December 1993
- Running time: 98 minutes
- Country: Hong Kong
- Language: Cantonese
- Box office: HK$19,874,595

He Ain't Heavy, He's My Father (新難兄難弟) is a 1993 Hong Kong comedy-drama film starring Tony Leung Ka-fai and Tony Leung Chiu-wai, who are unrelated, playing father and son. Directed by Peter Chan and Lee Chi-ngai, the film also stars Carina Lau, Anita Yuen and Lawrence Cheng.

The film is a remake of the 1960 film My Intimate Partners. The title is a pun on "He Ain't Heavy, He's My Brother", a hit single for The Hollies in 1969 and for Neil Diamond in 1970.

== Plot ==
Yuen scorns his father, who he thinks is too generous and forgiving. Through a flashback/time travel gimmick, Yuen meets his parents during their joyous courtship. Yuen comes to understand and admire his dad, and reflect on his own moral defects.

== Cast ==
- Tony Leung Ka-fai as Tommy Chor Fan
- Tony Leung Chiu-wai as Chor Yuen
- Carina Lau as Laura Watts
- Anita Yuen as Yee / Lynn
- Lawrence Cheng as Lone / Chuen
- Michael Chow as Mr. Cheung
- Anita Lee as Kan
- Lawrence Ng as Loanshark Fung
- Helen Yung as Yin
- Waise Lee as Li Ka-shing / Fan's neighbor (special appearance)
- Chor Yuen as Lord Watsons (cameo)
- Tsang Kan-wing as Laura's cousin (cameo)
- Poon Fong-fong as Siu-kuen (cameo)
- Pang Mei-seung as Laura's mom
- Valerie Chow as Dr. Jenny Chung
- Wong Wa-wo as Bridge player
- Joe Cheung as Photographer
- Kim Yip as Dr. Chi (Zhivago) / Bass player / rickshawman
- Teddy Chan as Kee
- Jacob Cheung as Uncle Mark Sevrn
- Alexander Chan as Fire Dept worker
- Chan Wing-chiu as Housing Authority staff
- Lee Hiu-tung as Bo-bo
- Hau Woon-ling as Richshaw passenger
- Andrew Kam as Sgt Rocky
- Hoh Wan as Kee's father
- Ng Cheuk-long as Young Chor Yuen
- Wong Hei-yeung as Young Lone
- Quintin Wong as Chow Kut

== Adaptation ==
There was a 2009 TVB adaptation of the film taking place in 2008 and then the 1960s. The father of the main character is played by Sunny Chan while the main character is played by Ron Ng.
