= Executioners (film) =

1993 Hong Kong film by Johnnie To

- Theatrical poster
- Directed by: Johnny To; Ching Siu-tung
- Written by: Susanne Chan
- Produced by: Ching Siu-tung; Johnny To; Yeung Kwok-fai
- Starring: Michelle Yeoh; Anita Mui; Maggie Cheung
- Cinematography: Poon Hang-Sang
- Edited by: Ah Chik; Chu San-Kit
- Music by: Cacine Wong
- Distributed by: China Entertainment Films
- Release date: 30 September 1993
- Running time: 97 minutes
- Country: Hong Kong
- Language: Cantonese

Executioners (Chinese: 現代豪俠傳; pinyin: Xian dai hao xia zhuan), is a 1993 Hong Kong fantasy film and a sequel to The Heroic Trio, directed by Johnny To. Executioners was directed by Johnnie To and Ching Siu-tung. The film stars Michelle Yeoh, Anita Mui and Maggie Cheung, returning as the main characters of the first film. Other cast include Damian Lau, Anthony Wong, Takeshi Kaneshiro, Lau Ching-Wan, Paul Chun and Kwan Shan.

== Plot ==
Executioners reunites the main characters of The Heroic Trio in a dark, post-apocalyptic story set in a world ravaged by war, torn by social and political strife, and desperately short of uncontaminated water.

The Wonder Woman (Anita Mui) is now the mother of a young girl (named Charlie in the English dubbed version, Cindy in the English subtitled version). She has abandoned her role as a crime fighter in order to become a better mother and wife. But while walking her daughter home from the grocery store, she witnesses an attempted water theft. In a brief display of her true prowess (and to the delight of her daughter), she stops the thief and returns the bagged water to the would-be victim.

The Invisible Girl (Michelle Yeoh) has finally accepted her true role as a hero and strives to atone for the evil deeds she committed while under the influence of her former Evil Master (as shown in The Heroic Trio). She has become an agent of change, striving to use her abilities for the good of society. She has gone so far as to become the tutor of the masked hunchback Kau, another of the Evil Master's former servants. Lured into a blast furnace in The Heroic Trio, Kau had been horribly burned and disfigured; somehow, he retains his almost superhuman vitality and ability, yet has no moral compass, other than his allegiance to his tutor. She hopes to reform him and show him a better way, as the Wonder Woman and the Thief Catcher did for her.

The Thief Catcher (Maggie Cheung) is still up to her old ways, just trying to make a profit out of a bad situation. Yet even she is starting to strive for a higher standard, and has come to realize that she is part of a team and has responsibilities to something greater than herself. The three heroes are forced to overcome devastating personal loss, conflicting loyalties, and overwhelming odds, to bring security and justice back to the people.

== Cast ==
- Michelle Yeoh as Ching/San/Carol
- Anita Mui as Tung/Wonder Woman/Dorothy
- Maggie Cheung as Chat/Thief Catcher/Chelsea
- Damian Lau as Inspector Lau
- Anthony Wong as Mr. Kim/Kau
- Takeshi Kaneshiro as Chong Hon/Coda
- Lau Ching-Wan as Ah Te
- Paul Chun as Colonel
- Kwan Shan as President

== Production ==
The film's theme song, "A Woman's Heart" (lyrics by Chik Lam, music by Law Tai-Yau), also the theme of The Heroic Trio, is sung by Anita Mui.
