= Wanfang =

- 萬芳
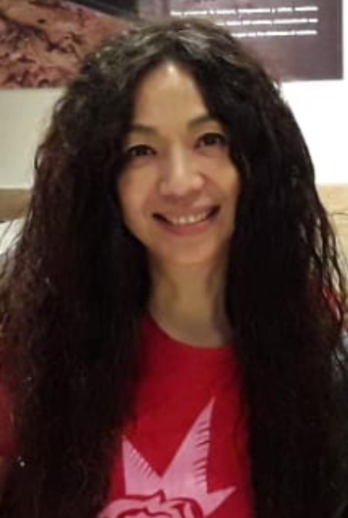
- Wanfang in 2019
- Born: Lin Wanfang; 6 July 1967 (age 59); Taipei, Taiwan
- Education: Chinese Culture University
- Occupations: Singer actress Radio DJ
- Years active: 1990–present
- Awards: Golden Bell Awards – 39th Best Actress; 2004 Cold Front; 43rd Best Supporting Actress in a Mini-series; 2008 PTV drama Life Exhibition: do not love Etude

Chinese name
- Traditional Chinese: 萬芳
- Simplified Chinese: 万芳
Transcriptions
- Musical career
- Also known as: One-Fang; Wanfang Lin
- Genre: Mandopop
- Instrument: Vocals
- Label: Pourquoi Pas Music

Lin Wanfang (Chinese: 萬芳; pinyin: Wànfāng; born 6 July 1967), professionally known as Wanfang, is a Taiwanese singer, actress and radio DJ. She is renowned for her sonorous, gentle soft voice and probably best known for being the original theme singer of the film C'est la vie, mon chéri (新不了情).

== Early life ==
She was part of the choir during her elementary and high school and was also involved in Country music during college, which established her musical literacy from an early age. While in university, she took part in a singing competition that kick-started her singing career.

== Career ==
Wanfang has been signed to Rock Records since the beginning of her career. Beside being an established singer, she is also very successful in Musical Drama and in recent years, place more emphasis on it as compared to singing. On top of being an actress and singer, she also works as a Radio DJ in BCC.

During the fall of 2010, Wanfang began her 'Those Night That You Are Not Aware' (你所不知道的那些夜晚) Asian Tour, her first ever solo performing concert since her debut 20 years ago. The opening concert in Taiwan featured Wu Bai as the special guest.

Wanfang was nominated in the 22nd Golden Melody Awards under Best Mandarin Female Singer (最佳國語女歌手獎) for her Let's not be sad (我們不要傷心了) album.

== Discography ==
=== Studio albums ===
- 1990 – Time Goes On (時間仍然繼續在走)
- 1992 – Fang Xin (放心)
- 1992 – Truth (真情)
- 1993 – Intimacy (貼心)
- 1994 – TEA FOR TWO
- 1994 – Disconnection (斷線)
- 1995 – Everything New! (一切如新)
- 1996 – Tear Apart (割愛)
- 1996 – Worthy Loving (就值得了愛)
- 1997 – Left Hand (左手)
- 1998 – The Answer (林萬芳歌本·答案)
- 1999 – No Substitute (不換)
- 2000 – This Day (這天)
- 2002 – The Chance of Love (相愛的運氣)
- 2010 – Let's Not Grieve Anymore (我們不要傷心了)
- 2012 – Love, After All (原來我們都是愛著的)
- 2018 – .....Rendezvous with Beauty (.....那些美麗的相遇)
- 2020 – Dear All (給你們)

=== Collections and compilations ===
- 1994 – Beautiful Hearts (芳心·精選輯)
- 1997 – Till the end of time (地老天芳·萬芳黃金精選輯)
- 2003 – Rock Records Golden Decade: Wan Fang Compilation Album (滾石香港黃金十年：萬芳精選)
- 2005 – One (New + Best Selection) (One (新歌+精選))

=== EP ===
- 2001 – Happy Receiving (EP) (收信快樂)
- 2015 – Half. Wan Fang Small Theatre (EP) (一半。萬芳的小劇場)

== Filmography ==
=== Television series ===
- 1996 – Search for lotus (尋找蓮花)
- 1998 – Hear the voice of the rainbow (聽見彩虹的聲音)
- 2002 – Floral side story (special appearances) (花香番外篇)
- 2004 – Cold front passing (絕地花園系列之《冷鋒過境》)
- 2005 – Moonlight outside of south gate (《撿稻穗系列-南門外的月光》)
- 2005 – There is a green called the Youth Green (有一種綠叫做青春綠)
- 2008 – Do not love Etudes (special appearances) (不愛練習曲)
- 2008 – Holiday (長假)
- 2008 – Taipei 24H: Share the Morning (台北異想-晨之美)
- 2011 – In Time with You (我可能不會愛你)
- 2012 – Hui Tou Kan Jian Ai (回頭看見愛)
- 2012 – An Innocent Mistake (罪美麗)
- 2016 – Rock Records in Love (滾石愛情故事)

=== Film ===
- 2005 – Sweetheart (戀人)
- 2006 – Deceitful Silk (詭絲)
- 2009 – Times (時光)
- 2009 – Track tub (軌道礦車)
- 2011 – Leaving Gracefully (帶一片風景走)
- 2011 – Mother (母親) (20 minute-short film)
- 2018 – Dear Ex (誰先愛上他的)
- 2023 – Snow in Midsummer (五月雪)

=== Programs ===
- 2013 – Share My Song (戀人)(guest host by Hong Kong Commercial Radio)

== Theater ==
- 1996 – Shamuleite, 22 runs (莎姆雷特)
- 1998 – Personals, 25 runs (徵婚啟事)
- 1999 – My sister, 29 runs (我妹妹)
- 2001 – Happy receipt of the letter, 11 runs in Taipei (收信快樂)
- 2002 – Love octave and a half boiling point, 5 runs (愛情沸點八度半)
- 2002 – Northern Arctic Light, 20 runs (北極之光)
- 2004 – Happy receipt of the letter, 6 runs in Beijing (收信快樂)
- 2004 – West of Guan Yang, 19 runs (西出陽關)
- 2006 – Legendary gods Gui Langjun, 5 runs (梨園天神-桂郎君)
- 2006 – Nu Er Hong, 20 runs (女兒紅)
- 2008 – Happy receipt of the letter, 10 runs (收信快樂)
- 2008 – Taiwan Village (寶島一村)
- 2012 – Taipei Dad New York Mom (台北爸爸紐約媽媽)
- 2013 – Happy receipt of the letter, 16 runs in Taipei and 10 runs in Beijing (收信快樂)
- 2013 – Jue Bu Fu Zhang (絕不付帳)
