= Angel Terminators =

1992 Hong Kong film by Wai Lit

- Film poster
- Traditional Chinese: 轟天皇家將
- Hanyu Pinyin: Hong tin huang jia jiang
- Directed by: Wai Lit
- Written by: Yeung Kei
- Produced by: George Lai Hing-lun
- Starring: Sharon Yeung Pan Pan; Kara Wai; Kenneth Tsang
- Cinematography: John Yeung Hok-leung
- Edited by: Leung Sui-Ho
- Music by: Tsang Kong Hwa
- Production company: Grandwell Film Production
- Distributed by: Golden Princess Amusement Company
- Release date: 10 October 1992 (Hong Kong)
- Running time: 92 minutes
- Country: Hong Kong
- Language: Cantonese
- Box office: HK$861,734

Angel Terminators (Chinese: 轟天皇家將, Gwang tin wong ga jeung; trans. "Rumble Sky Royal General") is a 1992 Hong Kong girls with guns film directed by Wai Lit and written by Yeung Kei, who also wrote Wai's first film Club Girls (1989).

An unrelated film titled Angel Terminators II in some territories was released in 1993.

== Plot ==
After solving a hostage crisis in a kindergarten with her partner Ada, Agent Chen Xiaohong leaves for Scotland. Meanwhile, Zeng Jian, a boss in the Rifuda Group, returns to Hong Kong after seven years in Thailand and immediately seeks out Bin, whom he blames for working with the police and forcing him to flee to Thailand for seven years. Bin tries to kill Zeng Jian, but Zeng Jian's enforcer Miss Nishiwaki kills Bin first. Zeng Jian distribute's Bin's wealth among his other four generals Rong, Tiedeng, Paowangbiao, and Fatal Xiong. The police secretly monitor this and suspect that one of these generals will be put in command of the organization now that Bin is dead. They are intrigued by the presence of the unknown figure Zeng Jian, whom they know only as "Sawa Da" based on his Thai passport information. Civilian Carrie is taken hostage at the mall by two fleeing thieves with machetes. Her police commissioner husband Jin Zhiyuan, Chen Xiaohong's cousin, saves her but is injured by the thieves.

Ada's informant Mei tells her that "Sawa Da" will be at a party at Club Xingda that night. There, Zeng Jian makes a deal with Leung Ming to receive drugs at the furniture warehouse at 9:00 p.m. on Friday the 13th. Zeng Jian attempts to reconnect with his old love Carrie, who has moved on and introduced him to her husband Jin Zhiyuan. Zeng Jian introduces himself as "Sawa Da". Ada confronts him at the party and announces that he is Zeng Jian. Mei tells Ada about the drug deal and the police raid it, leading to a fight in which Ada kills Zeng Jian's right-hand man Wei.

Jin Zhiyuan gets into debt playing poker at one of Zeng Jian's gambling houses and Zeng Jian uses this circumstance to force Carrie to have sex with him for money. Jin has meanwhile agreed to give Zeng Jian his seized merchandise in exchange for erasing the debt, leading to a fight between him and Carrie. Ada follows Jin to a meeting with Zeng Jian, who tells him that he had sex with Carrie for the money. Jin pulls his gun but Ada enters and tells him not to shoot. Jin is shot and killed by Zeng Jian and Ada is taken prisoner and forcefully made to become addicted to heroin.

Chen Xiaohong returns and is informed by Director Huang that the police believe that Ada killed her cousin. Carrie tries to save Ada but is killed by Miss Nishiwaki as Ada escapes. Ada seeks help from Mei, who suggests going to Xiaohong for help, but Ada is too ashamed about her condition to do so. Mei helps her recover through her heroin withdrawal period. Xiaohong asks Mei to let her see Xiaohong, but Xiaohong is too ashamed to see her. Miss Nishiwaki and other thugs arrive and kill Mei, causing Ada to come out of hiding to help Xiaohong defeat the other thugs. Together they infiltrate Zeng Jian's house, where he is making a deal with Samak. As Zeng Jian drives away in an attempt to escape, Ada jumps onto and hangs on an overhead power line to await him. He shoots her, but she manages to reach down and slit his throat, causing him to crash the car and die as she dies hanging from the power line.

== Cast ==
- Sharon Yeung Pan Pan as Ida
- Kara Wai as Hon
- Kenneth Tsang as Ken Zheng
- Carrie Ng as Carrie
- Dick Wei as Sama
- Alan Hsu as Brother Wei
- Michiko Nishiwaki as Miss Nishiwaki
- Lee Ching-Saan as Carrie's husband
- Cheng Yuen-Man as May
- Jimmy Au Shui-wai as policeman
- Philip Keung as drug dealer

== Production and release ==
The film was produced in 1990 but not released in Hong Kong until 10 October 1992. During its theatrical run from 10 to 14 October, it grossed HK$861,734.

The Hong Kong cut of the film runs nearly 93 minutes, while the export cut runs nearly 87 minutes with about six minutes of content cut. The director is credited as "Hank Lai" in some releases of the film.

== Reception ==
The book The Hong Kong Filmography gave a rating of four out of ten, stating, "There is well-staged and fairly inventive action here, and Yeung's final act is a real showstopper; but, more often than not, the proceedings are dreary and predictable."

Reviewer HKFanatic of cityonfire.com gave the film a rating of 6.5 out of 10, writing, "Considering the high production values showcased in Hong Kong movies like Hard Boiled or just about any Jackie Chan film, it’s easy to forget that there were still plenty of shoestring productions made on the island during its 90’s heyday. Angel Terminators is the kind of under-funded action film that relies on stuntman putting themselves in harm’s way in order to make up for its obviously low budget. ... But if you can get past the bad lighting, jumbled storyline, and misogynistic streak, then Angel Terminators has some amazing action scenes, which once again prove that nobody does it better than Hong Kong."

Reviewer LP Hugo of Asian Film Strike gave the film a rating of 3 stars, writing, "Angel Terminators is representative of the more violent and dark variety of 'Girls with Guns' films. [...] Angel Terminators benefits from no-nonsense direction, well-staged – if hardly remarkable – action scenes, and a truly charismatic cast".

The review on crichtonsworld.com reads, "The focus seems to be more on drama than on the action. In this genre this just doesn't work. We don't want to see these women humiliated or drugged. We want them to kick ass! [...] Apart from some decent scenes the action is not mind blowing. To be fair it is just average."

Reviewer Kenneth Brorsson of sogoodreviews.com wrote that the film's "main attraction, the action, takes a while to fully get going but by the end you'll have an image in your head of who the female equivalent of Jackie Chan would be. Namely Sharon Yeung. Clinging to cars while shooting guns, sliding down poles, performing a finale stunt worthy of the rewind button and in general kicking ass," concluding that the "finale is breathtaking and the film is another fine example of Hong Kong cinema not needing perfect pieces to add to a fine whole."

== Sequel ==
A film titled The Best of the Lady Kickboxer (Chinese: 火種; pinyin: Huo zhong; lit. 'Tinder') was released in some regions such as the UK and the US under the title Angel Terminators II, though none of the cast or crew are the same.

The Hong Kong Filmography gave a rating of four out of ten, writing, "While below average, the film still finds its stars in good form. [...] However, the proceedings are blandly directed, and the fight choreography rarely takes full advantage of the leads' abilities."

In his book Films of Fury, Ric Meyers called the film a "nasty, cheap, sizzling little film".

== Home media ==
Angel Terminators and Angel Terminators II were released on Blu-ray in Germany in 2024 and 2025 respectively.
