= Michael Chow (actor) =

Actor in Hong Kong

- Born: Zhou Qun (周群); 11 January 1960 (age 66); Beijing, China
- Occupation: Actor
- Years active: 1986—present

Chinese name
Transcriptions
Standard Mandarin
- Hanyu Pinyin: Zhōu Wénjiàn
Yue: Cantonese
- Jyutping: Cau1 Man4 Gin6

Michael Chow Man-Kin (周文健) is a Beijing-born Hong Kong–based actor.

== Biography ==
Chow's ancestral home is Fujian, born in Beijing. He came to Hong Kong at the age of four, immigrated to Canada with his family at the age of nine, graduated from the Department of Psychology at York University in Canada in 1985, and then began his acting career in Hong Kong. The first film to be officially performed was "Inspector Chocolate" in 1986, and since then he has played a leading and supporting role in Hong Kong films many times. In the 2000s, due to the sluggish market for Hong Kong films, most of them performed in the United States, and rarely appeared in Hong Kong.

In 2017, he returned to shoot commercials and movies in front of the camera.

== Filmography ==
- Inspector Chocolate (1986) – Inspector Leung
- Goodbye Darling (1987) – Party Member with gun
- City War (1988) – Bobby
- The Big Heat (1988) – Assassin
- The Inspector Wears Skirts (1988) – Peter
- Heart to Hearts (1988)
- Police Story 2 (1988) – CID Cop
- Keep on Dancing (1988) – Mental patient
- Blood Call (1988) – Michael
- The Eighth Happiness (1988) – Ying-Ying's boyfriend
- Raid on Royal Casino Marine aka. The Inspector Wears Skirts III (1990) – Captain
- God of Gamblers (1989) – Casino manager
- Miracles (1989) – Dai Jek Dung
- I Am Sorry (1989)
- Hearts No Flowers (1989)
- Nobles (1989) – Blind Date
- Her Fatal Ways 2 (1991) – Ah Fu
- Fallen Angel (1991) (TV) – Angel
- Alien Wife (1991)
- Her Fatal Ways (1991) – Niu
- Cash on Delivery (1992) –Rookie gigolo
- Fight Back to School II (1992) – Undercover student
- Talk to Me Dicky (1992)
- Sister in Law (1992)
- Forced Nightmare (1992) – Vampire
- Changing Partner (1992) – Mr. Cheung
- Even Mountains Meet (1993) – Mambo
- Tom, Dick and Hairy (1993) – Michelle
- Thou Shalt Not Swear (1993) – Inspector Chow
- Vampire Family (1993) – Werewolf Butler
- He Ain't Heavy... He's My Father (1993) – The Professor
- Kung Fu Scholar (1993) – Ah Mou
- Crazy Hong Kong (1993) – Truck driver
- Beginner's Luck (1994) – Hark
- The Third Full Moon (1994) – Inspector Chow
- Modern Romance (1994) – Mr. Five Elements
- Doug's Choice (1994) – Douglas Ng
- The Crucifixion (1994) – Ah Yung
- Asian Connection (1995) – Ah Mike
- The Case of the Cold Fish (1995) – Jau Zai / Dick Chow Long-Dong
- Twist (1995) – Dr. Lam
- City Cop (1995) – Chow Sir
- Mr. Mumble (1996) – Ryô Saeba / Mr. Mumble
- Bodyguards of the Last Governor (1996) – Bodyguard, Dai Kin
- Banana Club (1996) – Michael
- 02:00 A.M. (1996) – Ghost-obsessed dancer
- Web of Deception (1997) – Donson Woo
- Enjoy Yourself Tonight (1997) – Sau Sou Lo
- Top Borrower (1997) – Dai B
- Killing Me Hardly (1997) – Bob
- All's Well, Ends Well 1997 (1997) – Himself
- 24 Hours Ghost Story (1997) – Himself
- The Spirit of the Dragon (1998)
- Love in Shanghai (1998) (TV) – Lao Da
- Ninth Happiness (1998) – Ma Lun Dai
- 14 Days Before Suicide (1999)
- Golden Nightmare (1999) – Joe
- Temptation of an Angel (1999) – Fei
- Sworn Revenge (2000) – Michael Wong Si
- 9 September (2000) – Michael
- Snakeheads (2001) – Chung
- The Era of Vampires (2002) – Fat
- Twilight Zone Cops: My Spirited Wife (2002) (V) – Officer Ben Li
- Fate Fighter (2003)
- Kung Phooey! (2003) – Art Chew
- Forever Yours (2004) – Lou Jao
- Love Trilogy (2004) – Li Caishun
- Son of the Dragon (2008) – Bo
- The Sparring Partner (2022)
- Where the Wind Blows (2023) – Fat-Bee
- Crisis Negotiators (2024) – Li Chun Kit
- Cold War 1994 (2026) – Hui Wai-hon
