= All Men Are Brothers: Blood of the Leopard =

1993 Hong Kong film by Billy Chan

- Film poster
- 水滸傳之英雄本色
- Directed by: Billy Chan
- Screenplay by: Johnny Lee
- Based on: Water Margin by Shi Nai'an
- Produced by: Wilson Tong
- Starring: Tony Leung; Joey Wong; Elvis Tsui; Sean Lau
- Cinematography: Joe Chan
- Edited by: Poon Hung
- Music by: William Hu
- Production companies: HK Film Entertainment Production; Pearl River Films; China Film Group Corporation
- Distributed by: Newport Entertainment
- Release date: 2 April 1993
- Running time: 97 minutes
- Country: Hong Kong
- Language: Cantonese
- Box office: HK$6,595,025

All Men Are Brothers: Blood of the Leopard (水滸傳之英雄本色) is a 1993 Hong Kong wuxia film adapted from the 14th-century classical novel Water Margin, focusing on the backstory of Lin Chong and his sworn brotherhood with Lu Zhishen. The film was directed by Billy Chan and starred Tony Leung, Joey Wong, Elvis Tsui and Sean Lau.

== Synopsis ==
Lin Chong, the martial arts instructor of the imperial guards in the capital, is a righteous man who is highly regarded by the imperial court. One day, he meets the monk Lu Zhishen at Mount Wutai and becomes sworn brothers with him. Lu Zhishen urges Lin Chong to accompany him to Liangshan Marsh to join the outlaw band there, saying that the imperial government is corrupt and not worth serving. Lin Chong declines the offer.

Lin Chong later meets Qiu Wu and befriends him. Gao Yanei, the godson of Gao Qiu, a corrupt high-ranking official, lusts for Lin Chong's wife. Gao Yanei's henchman, Lu Qian, is bent on taking Lin Chong's position, so he plots with Gao Yanei to frame Lin Chong for attempting to assassinate Gao Qiu. Lin Chong is sentenced to face-tattooing and exiled to Changzhou.

Meanwhile, Lin Chong's wife is accidentally killed by Gao Yanei while defending herself from his advances on her. Qiu Wu, who is mortally wounded, informs Lin Chong of what has happened. Lu Zhishen shows up to save Lin Chong and they fight the soldiers together. Lin Chong eventually kills Lu Qian, and avenges his wife and Qiu Wu. Left with no choice, he decides to follow Lu Zhishen to join the outlaw band at Liangshan Marsh.

== Cast ==
- Tony Leung as Lin Chong
- Joey Wong as Lin Chong's wife
- Elvis Tsui as Lu Zhishen
- Sean Lau as Qiu Wu
- Lam Wai as Lu Qian
- Lau Shun as Gao Qiu
- Pal Sinn as Gao Yanei
- Austin Wai as Lei Heng
- Wu Ma as the Prime Minister

== Box office ==
The film grossed HK$6,595,025 at the Hong Kong box office during its theatrical run from 2 to 15 April 1993 in Hong Kong.

== Award nomination ==
- 13th Hong Kong Film Awards
  - Nominated: Best Supporting Actor (Elvis Tsui)
