= Days of Tomorrow =

1993 Hong Kong film by Jeffrey Lau

- US film poster

Chinese name
- Traditional Chinese: 天長地久
- Simplified Chinese: 天长地久
Transcriptions
Standard Mandarin
- Hanyu Pinyin: Tiān Cháng Dì Jiǔ
Yue: Cantonese
- Jyutping: Tin1 Ceong4 Dei6 Gau2
- Directed by: Jeffrey Lau
- Written by: Jeffrey Lau
- Produced by: Andy Lau; Daniel Yu
- Starring: Andy Lau; Jay Lau; Carrie Ng; Deanie Ip; Hilary Tsui
- Cinematography: Arthur Wong
- Edited by: Patrick Tam; Hai Kit-wai
- Music by: Lowell Lo; Stephen Shing
- Production company: Teamwork Motion Pictures
- Distributed by: Newport Entertainment
- Release date: 5 August 1993
- Running time: 93 minutes
- Country: Hong Kong
- Language: Cantonese
- Box office: HK$9,600,943

Days of Tomorrow (天長地久) is a 1993 Hong Kong romantic drama film written and directed by Jeffrey Lau, produced by and starring Andy Lau.

== Summary ==
Days of Tomorrow tells the story of a young girl, Yan (Hilary Tsui), who has been brought up never knowing much about her father. Her mother won't tell her and all she knows is that he was an actor in an old movie. When the movie is set to be remade, she applies for a job and it is there she runs into a woman who doesn't want the movie remade who knows her father. The woman tells her the story of the actor Fong Tak-shing (Andy Lau).

== Cast ==
- Andy Lau as Fong Tak-shing
- Jay Lau as Ling / Lily
- Carrie Ng as Nancy
- Deanie Ip as Ling's mother (guest star)
- Hilary Tsui as Yan
- Yip san as Sheung
- Lau Kong as Lam
- Henry Fong as Mr. Lui
- Danny Poon as Ban
- Kenneth Chan as Movie star
- Power Chan as Pong
- Lee Siu-kei as Keung
- Lam Seung-mo as Sheung's lover
- Daniel Yu as Movie director
- Eric Kong as Cheong
- Hon San
- Kwok Tak-sun as Uncle Six
- So Wai-nam
- Lam Kwok-kit
- Jameson Lam

== See also ==
- Andy Lau filmography
