= Elvis Tsui =

Chinese actor

Elvis Tsui Kam-kong
- 徐錦江
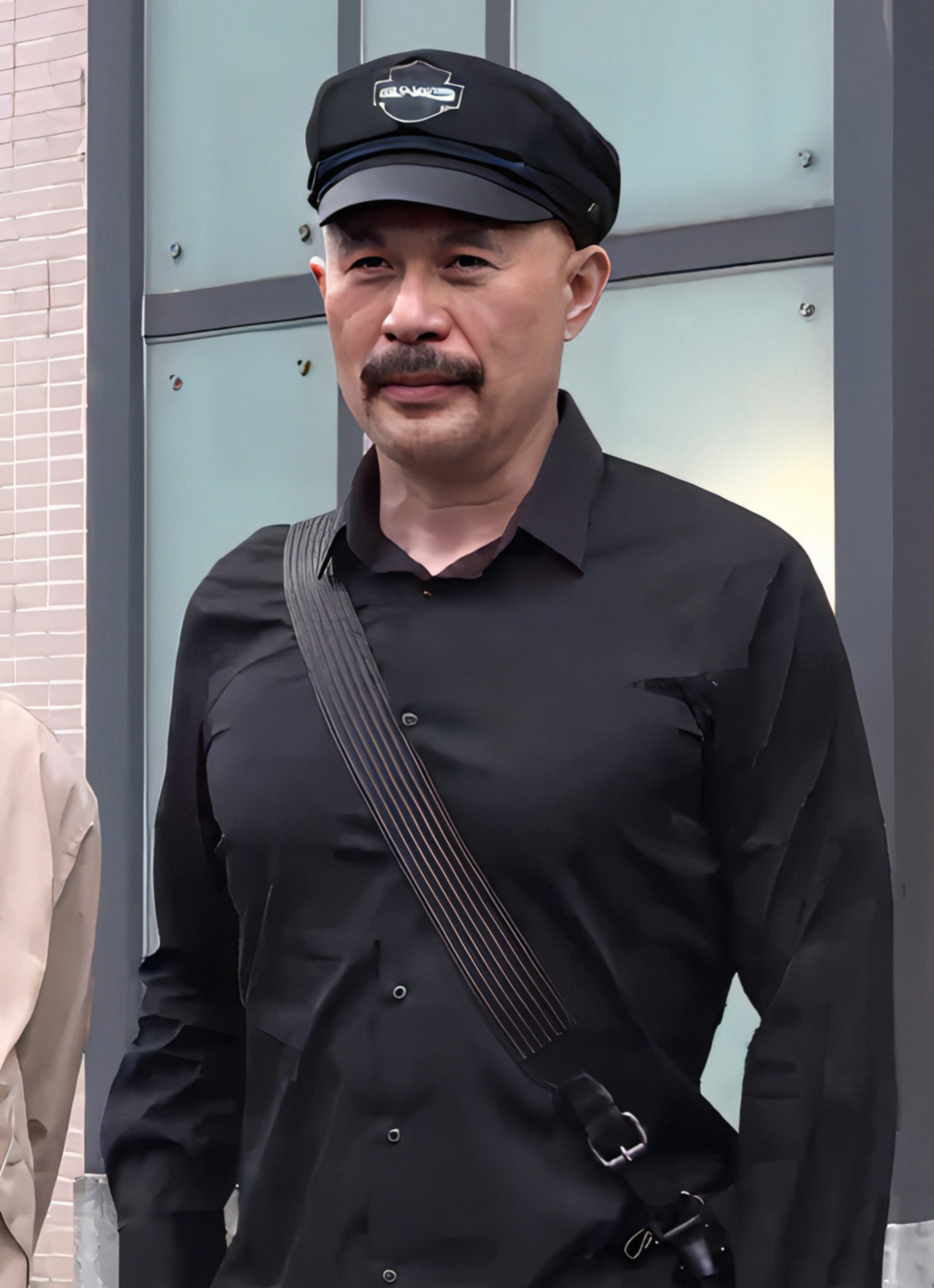
- Tsui in 2019
- Born: Xu Jinjiang; October 12, 1961 (age 65); Mudanjiang, Heilongjiang, China
- Education: Guangzhou Academy of Fine Arts
- Occupations: Actor; artist
- Years active: 1983–present
- Spouse: Yin Zhuping (m. 1992)
- Children: Figo Tsui Fei (son)

Chinese name
- Traditional Chinese: 徐錦江
- Simplified Chinese: 徐锦江
Transcriptions
Standard Mandarin
- Hanyu Pinyin: Xú Jǐnjiāng

Elvis Tsui Kam-kong (born October 12, 1961) is a Hong Kong actor and artist.

Tsui is primarily known for his roles in erotic films and martial arts films, where he is more often cast as villains. Some of the famous characters he has portrayed repeatedly include Oboi, Lu Zhishen, Sorcerer Aquala and An Lushan.

== Biography ==
Tsui graduated from the Guangzhou Academy of Fine Arts with a degree in arts. He was also a student of the artist Guan Shanyue. In 1982, Tsui went to Hong Kong to expand his career as an artist, photographer, model and nightclub singer.

In 1987, Tsui met film director Johnny Mak, who invited him to act in Long Arm of the Law II. Tsui was often cast as the antagonist or villain in most of the films and television series he acted in, because of his fierce looks. Tsui has also acted in Hong Kong erotic films (Category III), such as the Sex and Zen series and Viva Erotica (1996), which earned him a Best Supporting Actor nomination at the 16th Hong Kong Film Awards. Tsui has ventured into mainland Chinese film industry in recent times and currently works with film director Wong Jing.

== Filmography ==
=== Film ===
Year	English title	Chinese title	Role	Notes
1983	The Lady is the Boss	掌門人		
1983	Shaolin Prince	少林傳人	Monk Wuren	
1983	Holy Flame of the Martial World	武林聖火令		
1983	Shaolin Intruders	三闖少林	Shaolin Jingang	
1983	Health Warning	打擂台	tall skinhead fighter	
1983	Shaolin and Wu Tang	少林與武當	Shaolin abbot	
1983	The Boxer's Omen	魔	Abbot Qingzhao	
1983	The Enchantress	妖魂	Yun Feiyang's brother	
1984	The Hidden Power of the Dragon Sabre	魔殿屠龍	Weizhen	
1984	Return of the Bastard Swordsman	布衣神相	Diancang Sect leader	
1984	Wits of the Brats	南斗官三鬥北少爺		
1984	Lust from Love of a Chinese Courtesan	愛奴新傳	brothel customer	
1984	My Darling Genie	我愛神仙遮	Ren's thug	
1984	Opium and the Kung-Fu Master	洪拳大師	Cat's hired rascal	
1984	New Tales of the Flying Fox	新飛狐外傳		
1985	The Master Strikes Back	教頭發威	soldier	
1985	Girl with the Diamond Slipper	摩登仙履奇緣	prisoner in leather jacket	
1985	It's a Drink! It's a Bomb!	聖誕奇遇結良緣	tall Japanese killer	
1985	The Flying Mr. B	鬼馬飛人	Alien	
1985	Let's Make Laugh II	再見七日情	John's thug	
1985	Crazy Shaolin Disciples	弟子也瘋狂	baldy monk	
1985	The Man is Dangerous	山東狂人		
1986	Chocolate Inspector	神探朱古力	child smuggler	
1986	The Seventh Curse	原振俠與衛斯理	Aquala	
1987	City on Fire	龍虎風雲	Chan Kam-wah	
1987	Long Arm of the Law II	省港旗兵續集兵分兩路	Li Heung-tung	
1987	Tragic Hero	英雄好漢	Yung's thug	
1987	Born to Gamble	爛賭英雄	Winnie's new boyfriend	
1987	A Chinese Ghost Story	倩女幽魂	Chyun Cheung	
1988	Moon, Star, Sun	月亮 星星 太陽		cameo
1988	Gunmen	天羅地網	Superintendent	
1988	Double Crossed	通天拍檔		
1989	Long Arm of the Law Part 3	省港旗兵第三集	Mao Heung-yeung	
1989	The Iceman Cometh	急凍奇俠	Scientist	
1989	Sentenced to Hang	三狼奇案	Tang Chi-king	
1990	Long Arm of the Law Part 4: Underground Express	省港旗兵第四集地下通道	Wong Bing	
1991	To Be Number One	跛豪	Dummy / Chi	
1991	Prison on Fire II	監獄風雲II逃犯	Officer Zau	
1991	Sex and Zen	玉蒲團之偷情寶鑑	Wong Chut	
1992	Royal Tramp	鹿鼎記	Oboi	
1992	The Shootout	危險情人	Han	
1992	Lover's Tear	誓不忘情	Lin Wei	
1992	New Dragon Gate Inn	新龍門客棧		
1993	Lord of East China Sea	歲月風雲之上海皇帝	Yuen Siu-kwan	
1993	Butterfly and Sword	新流星蝴蝶劍	Suen Yuk-pa	
1993	All Men Are Brothers: Blood of the Leopard	水滸傳之英雄本色	Lu Zhishen	
1993	Lord of East China Sea II	上海皇帝之雄霸天下	Yuen Siu-kwan	
1993	The Sword Stained with Royal Blood	新碧血劍	First Master Wan	
1993	The Sword of Many Loves	飛狐外傳	Fung Nam-tin	
1994	God of Gamblers Returns	賭神2	Kok Ching-chung	
1994	Ancient Chinese Whorehouse	青樓十二房	Royal Highness	cameo
1994	The Three Swordsmen	刀劍笑	Wham Dao	
1994	The Lovers	梁祝	Zhu Yingtai's father	
1994	Fatal Obsession	入魔		
1994	The Great Conqueror's Concubine	西楚霸王	Zhongli Mo	
1994	A Chinese Torture Chamber Story	滿清十大酷刑	Win Chung-lung	
1994	Hail the Judge	九品芝麻官白面包青天	Panther	
1994	Girls Unbutton	不扣鈕的女孩	Lung Mao	
1994	Deadful Melody	六指琴魔	Tung-fong Pak	
1994	Wonder Seven	7金剛	Coach	
1994	1941 Hong Kong on Fire	香港淪陷		
1994	Law on the Brink	流氓律師		
1994	Give and Take	正乞兒!!	Werewolf	
1995	Full Throttle	烈火戰車	Lao Gui	
1995	Trilogy of Lust II	血戀II	Philip Chen	
1995	Sixty Million Dollar Man	百變星君	Professor Chang Sze	
1995	Ten Brothers	十兄弟	General Hu	
1995	The Eternal Evil of Asia	南洋十大邪術	Ah-kong	
1995	01:00 A.M.	夜半一點鐘	Officer #663	
1995	Spike Drink Gang	迷魂黨	butcher	
1995	The Meaning of Life	搶閘媽咪		
1995	China Dragon	中國龍	Gang chief in Hawaii	
1996	The Hero of Swallow	神偷燕子李三	Hung Lai-fu	
1996	Till Death Do Us Laugh	怪談協會	Father Chui	
1996	Viva Erotica	色情男女		
1996	Yu Pui Tsuen III	大內密探之靈靈性性		
1996	Street Angels	紅燈區	Moro	
1996	Devil's Woman	南洋第一邪降	Lam Kwok-kong	
1996	Hong Kong Show Girl	癲馬女郎之一夜情	Daai Hing	
1996	Dangerous Duty	危險任務	black beanie assassin	
1996	Another Chinese Cop	中國O記之血腥情人	Wa-keung	
1996	Dragon in Shaolin	龍在少林	Fung	
1996	Twinkle Twinkle Lucky Star	運財智叻星	God of matchmakers	
1996	Growing Up	人細鬼大	Teacher Xu	
1996	God of Gamblers 3: The Early Stage	賭神3之少年賭神	Lau Tai-chin	
1996	Street of Fury	龍虎砵蘭街	Chuen Wong	
1996	Sex and Zen II	玉蒲團II玉女心經	Sai Moon-kin	
1996	Bloody Friday	血腥Friday	police captain	
1997	Chinese Midnight Express	黑獄斷腸歌之砌生豬肉	Sam-chek-keuk	
1997	Erotic Ghost Story – Perfect Match	聊齋艷譚之幽媾	Monk Talkative	
1997	Too Many Ways To Be No. 1	一個字頭的誕生		
1997	The Fruit Is Swelling	蜜桃成熟時1997	Chiu Siu-fun	
1997	02:00 A.M.	夜半2點鐘	Kau / Lung	
1997	Emperor in Lust	皇帝也風流	Emperor Wong	
1997	Romance of the West Chamber	西廂艷譚	Monk Faben	
1997	Midnight Zone	迴轉壽屍	Ah-yan	
1997	The Hitman Chronicles: Jing Ke	大刺客—荊軻	Jing Ke	TV film
1998	Chinese Erotic Ghost Story	玉女聊齋	Lu Pan	
1998	Exodus from Afar	色降II萬里驅魔	Hsu Tai-chiang	
1998	Severely Rape	極度強姦	Jacky	
1998	How to Get Rich by Fung Shui?	行運秘笈		
1998	The Demon's Baby	猛鬼食人胎	General Hsu	
1998	Take Five	對不起，隊 妳		
1998	Sex and Zen III	玉蒲團III官人我要	Sir Lui	
1998	The Storm Riders	風雲─雄霸天下	Seedy Sword	
1998	Deadly Illusion	血仍是冷	Wolf	
1998	Faces of Horror	面青青有排驚		
1998	Super Energetic Man	戇豆豆追女仔	Captain Lorento	
1998	T.H.E. Professionals	職業大賊		
1999	Hong Kong Spice Gals	旺角靚妹仔		
1999	Indecent Woman	女色狼		
1999	Mysterious Story I: Please Come Back	怪異集之你回來吧!		
1999	A Man Called Hero	中華英雄	Bigot	
1999	Body Weapon	原始武器	Officer Leung	
1999	Loving Girl	風流名妓蘇小小		
1999	Lawrence of Mongolia	大漠梟雄		
1999	Love in Blue	藍色情迷		
1999	Bewitched	小心女人	Bar owner	
1999	Water Margin: Heroes' Sex Stories	水滸傳之英雄好色	Li Kui	
1999	Wonton Love	蕩女痴男	Tien Lie-liang	
1999	Gambler Series: Fraudulent Culture	賭王千霸之光棍遇著無皮柴		
1999	Tattooed She-Killer	刺青女殺手		
1999	The Doctor in Spite of Himself	醫神	Mayor Hum Kut	
1999	Shui Hwu Legend	李逵傳奇		
1999	The Wanted Convict	AK47之天網		
1999	Love & Sex in Sung Dynasty	宋朝風月		
1999	Gold Rush	追金行動		
2000	Hong Kong Pie	香港處男	Principal Tsui	
2000	The Teacher Without Chalk	流氓師表	principal	
2000	Chinese Midnight Express II	黑獄斷腸歌II：無期徒刑	chief warden	
2000	The Duel	決戰紫禁之巔	Moustache Gold	
2000	The Warning Time	鐵男本色		
2000	A Gifted Scholar and a Pretty Girl	風流才子俏佳人		
2000	Back for Your Life	索命		
2001	Sinful Confessions	風流韻事		
2001	Moods of Love	風花雪月		
2001	Clueless	不解之謎	Kim	
2001	Sex Medusa	獸性難馴	Cheung Yung-choi	
2002	Cafe Shop	茶餐廳十四號	cafe manager	
2002	Starlets Sale	慾海星沉		
2003	A Jealous Sister	傷生兒	Cheung	
2003	The Spy Dad	絕種鐵金剛	Lungyi	
2004	Bodyguards	兩個保鑣	Boss Chiu Hung	
2004	Gun Affinity	槍緣	Junqiang	
2004	The Secret in Zhou Dynasty	大周秘案	Ding Junchen	
2005	Hydra	蛇界		
2007	Magazine Gap Road	馬己仙峽道	Mao	
2011	A Chinese Ghost Story	倩女幽魂	village chief	
2013	The Grandmaster	一代宗師	Commissioner Xiong	
2013	An End to Killing	止殺令	Yelü Chucai	
2014	The Bat Night			
2015	Imprisoned: Survival Guide for Rich and Prodigal	壹獄壹世界: 高登闊少踎監日記		

=== TV dramas ===
Year	English title	Chinese title	Role	Notes
1995	Secret Battle of the Majesty	九王奪位	Nian Gengyao	
1995	Justice Pao	新包青天	Chen Niu	
1996	Sun Tzu's Art of War	孫子兵法		
1996	ICAC Investigators 1996	廉政行動1996	Lau Tai-pang	
1997	The Detective of Beijing	京都神探		
1997	A Monk at Thirty	一枝花和尚	Lu Zhishen	
1998	Sequel to the Water Margin	水滸後傳之拭血問劍	Lu Zhishen	
1999	Hero of the Times	新方世玉	Ao Tianwei	
1999	God of Food	食神		
2000	Lotus Lantern	天地傳說之寶蓮燈	Tian Lei	
2000	The Duke of Mount Deer	小寶與康熙	Oboi	
2000	The Eight-Year-Old Prince	八歲龍爺鬧東京	Liang Ji	
2000	A Family in Hong Kong	香港一家人		
2000	Dynasty Tong	楊貴妃	An Lushan	
2001	Jin Bohu	金搏虎		
2001	The Monk Ji Gong	濟公傳奇		
2002	The Legendary Siblings 2	絕世雙驕	Boss Yu	
2002	Book and Sword, Gratitude and Revenge	書劍恩仇錄	Tuying	
2002	Silver Rat	銀鼠	Niu Dabizi	
2003	The Heaven Sword and Dragon Saber	倚天屠龍記	Xie Xun	
2003	The Price of Glory			
2003	The Four Detective Guards	四大名捕	Liu Jiyan	
2004	Oriental Express Surprises	惊天东方号		
2004	Thirteen Sons of Heaven Bridge	天橋十三郎	Ai Daren	
2004	Heroes of Sui and Tang Dynasties	隋唐英雄傳	Wang Xiao'er	
2004	Happy Piggy	喜氣洋洋豬八戒	Wufa Wutian	
2004	Assassinator Jing Ke	荊軻傳奇	Bai Qi	
2005	I Love Zhong Wuyan	我愛鍾無艷		
2005	Detective Story A.S.T.	偵探物語		
2005	Chinese Paladin	仙劍奇俠傳	Shi Jie Ren Leader of Moon Worshiping Cult	
2005	Devildom			
2005	The Proud Twins	小魚兒與花無缺	E Tongtian	
2005	Junzi Haoqiu	君子好逑	Prince Jing	
2005	The Little Fairy	天外飛仙	Jade Emperor	
2006	Magical Hands	猜心妙手	Hu Yidao	
2007	King Qian in Wuyue	吳越錢王	Dong Chang	
2008	Royal Tramp	鹿鼎記	Oboi	
2008	The Legend of the Condor Heroes	射鵰英雄傳	Ouyang Feng	
2010	The Legend of Yang Guifei	楊貴妃秘史	An Lushan	
2011	Journey to the West	西遊記	Sha Wujing	
2011	Give Me 5ive	一屋住家人		
2012	King's War	楚漢傳奇	Wei Bao	
2013	Fox Fairy	狐仙		
2014	The Four Scholars in Jiangnan	江南四大才子	Zhu Chenhao	
2014	The Legend of Bubai Monk	布袋和尚新傳	White Elephant	
2015	The Last Emperor	末代皇帝傳奇	Zhang Xun	

== Awards and nominations ==
Year	#	Award	Category	Work	Result
1994	13th	Hong Kong Film Awards	Best Supporting Actor	All Men Are Brothers: Blood of the Leopard	Nominated
1997	16th	Hong Kong Film Awards	Best Supporting Actor	Viva Erotica	Nominated
