= The Sword Stained with Royal Blood (film) =

1993 Hong Kong film by Cheung Hoi-ching

- DVD cover
- 新碧血劍
- Directed by: Cheung Hoi-ching
- Screenplay by: Cheung Hoi-ching; Wai San
- Based on: Sword Stained with Royal Blood by Jin Yong
- Produced by: Cheung Hoi-ching
- Starring: Yuen Biao; Sharla Cheung; Danny Lee; Ng Man-tat; Anita Yuen; Elsie Yeh; Elizabeth Lee; Elvis Tsui; Barry Sze
- Cinematography: Ma Kam-cheung; Stephen Poon; Lau Hung-chuen
- Edited by: Poon Hung
- Music by: Mark Lui; James Wong
- Production company: Production Line Films
- Distributed by: Regal Films Distribution
- Release date: 25 November 1993
- Running time: 103 minutes
- Country: Hong Kong
- Language: Cantonese
- Box office: HK$1,517,179

The Sword Stained with Royal Blood (新碧血劍) is a 1993 Hong Kong wuxia film adapted from the novel Sword Stained with Royal Blood by Jin Yong. The film was written, produced and directed by Cheung Hoi-ching and starred Yuen Biao, Sharla Cheung, Danny Lee, Ng Man-tat, and Anita Yuen

== Cast ==
- Yuen Biao as Yuan Chengzhi
- Sharla Cheung as Ajiu
- Danny Lee as Xia Xueyi
- Ng Man-tat as Gui Xinshu
- Anita Yuen as He Tieshou
- Elsie Yeh as Xia Qingqing
- Elizabeth Lee as Wen Yi
- Elvis Tsui as Wen Laoda
- Barry Sze as Wu Hake
- Wu Ma as Sun Zhongshou
- Lung Fong as Wen Laoer
- Tai Bo as Wen Laosi
- Pauline Wong as He Hongyao
- Helen Ma as Gui Erniang
- Melvin Wong as Wen Laosan
- Peter Chan as Wen Laowu
- Ng Yuen-chun as Qi Yun'ao
