= Anita Yuen =

Hong Kong actress

- 袁詠儀
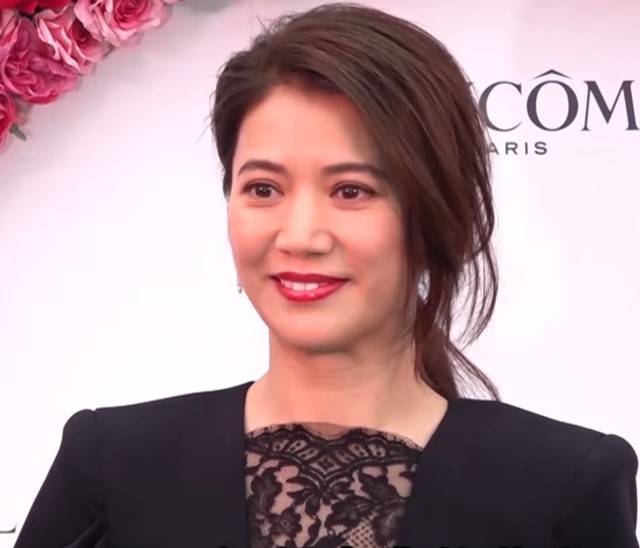
- Yuen in April 2019
- Born: Hong Kong
- Occupation: Actress
- Years active: 1990–present
- Spouse: Julian Cheung (m. 2001)
- Children: Morton Cheung (son) (b. 2006)

Chinese name
- Traditional Chinese: 袁詠儀
- Simplified Chinese: 袁咏仪
Transcriptions
Standard Mandarin
- Hanyu Pinyin: Yuán Yǒngyí
Yue: Cantonese
- Jyutping: jyun4 wing6 ji4

Anita Yuen Wing Yee is a Hong Kong actress and beauty pageant titleholder. She is best known for her roles in the films C'est la vie, mon chéri (1993), He's a Woman, She's a Man (1994), and From Beijing with Love (1994).

== Pageant career ==
At the age of 18, Yuen won the Miss Hong Kong. She also took home the award for Miss Photogenic. The following year, Yuen represented Hong Kong in the 1991 Miss Chinese International pageant, ultimately finishing at first runner up. She represented Hong Kong at the Miss Universe 1991 pageant in Las Vegas.

David Bordwell noted that in Hong Kong beauty pageants, particularly Miss Hong Kong, was a breeding ground for future star actresses such as Yuen to emerge.

== Film career ==
Yuen's first film role was a bit part in Blackie Ko's film The Days of Being Dumb (1992). For her performance, she won Best New Performer at the 12th Hong Kong Film Awards.

Yuen is best known for her role as the female lead in Derek Yee's 1993 tear-jerker C'est la vie, mon chéri (1993). She is also well-remembered in her cross-gender comic role opposite Leslie Cheung in He's a Woman, She's a Man (1994). The two roles won for her the Hong Kong Academy Best Actress awards. She also gave a powerful performance in, for instance, The Chinese Feast, co-starring together with Leslie Cheung. Apart from her role in a great many films, she has also acted in a number of Mainland-Taiwan television serials, such as Hua Mu Lan, opposite Vincent Zhao.

== Personal life ==
Her husband is Hong Kong actor and singer Julian Cheung. In May 2006, Yuen announced that she was 3 months pregnant with their first child. Their son, Morton Cheung, was born on November 12, 2006. On June 23, 2007, Yuen was a guest on TVB's Be My Guest with host Stephen Chan revealing that she and Julian were secretly married in Shibuya City, Japan, back in 2001. Anita had finally revealed in early 2021 that after she gave birth to Morton, she and her husband Julian attempted to have a second child first through natural conception with desire for their son Morton to have a little brother or sister, however this attempt failed as Anita's natural increasing age was an antithetical factor. Anita and Julian then agreed to try In vitro fertilisation using sperm extracted from Julian's collected preserved semen to impregnate Anita, but after multiple procedural attempts, the attempted pregnancy was unsuccessful and they eventually gave up on the attempt.

== Filmography ==
=== Film ===
| Year | Title | Role |
|---|---|---|
| 1992 | The Days of Being Dumb | Jane |
| 1992 | Talk to Me Dicky | |
| 1992 | Handsome Siblings | Madam Ti |
| 1993 | A Warrior's Tragedy | Ting Ling-Lam |
| 1993 | Prince of Portland Street | Yao-Yao |
| 1993 | Tom, Dick and Hairy | Fong |
| 1993 | The Incorruptible | Joss Lee |
| 1993 | Last Hero in China | Miss Nine |
| 1993 | Legend of the Liquid Sword | Red |
| 1993 | The Sword Stained with Royal Blood | Jade Ho |
| 1993 | He Ain't Heavy, He's My Brother | Yee/Lynn |
| 1994 | From Beijing with Love | Siu Kam |
| 1994 | He's a Woman, She's a Man | Lam Chi Wing |
| 1994 | C'est la vie, mon chéri | Min |
| 1994 | Crystal Fortune Run | Ko Kit |
| 1994 | The True Hero | Hung |
| 1994 | I've Got You, Babe | Ron |
| 1994 | The Wrath of Silence | Kwong Mei-Chi |
| 1994 | Crossings | Mo-yung |
| 1994 | It's a Wonderful Life | Shou-Kit Ho |
| 1994 | He & She | Tai Lok-Yee |
| 1994 | I Will Wait for You | Cheung Wai-Sum |
| 1994 | A Taste of Killing and Romance | Yu-Feng |
| 1994 | Whatever You Want | Ko Sau-Ping |
| 1994 | Tears and Triumph | Sai Ming-Jun |
| 1995 | Heaven Can't Wait | Moon Lady |
| 1995 | Just Married | |
| 1995 | The Chinese Feast | Au Ka-Wai |
| 1995 | The Age of Miracles | Mrs. Sheung |
| 1995 | Tragic Commitment | Lam Hiu-Tung |
| 1995 | Thunderbolt | Amy Yip |
| 1995 | The Golden Girls | Mei-Ball |
| 1995 | I Want to Go on Living | Yip Fan |
| 1995 | 01:00 A.M. | Fong Siu-Yin |
| 1995 | Tricky Business | Moon |
| 1996 | Entrance of the P-Side | Yip Yuk-Sum |
| 1996 | Tristar | Bai Xuehua |
| 1996 | Till Death Do Us Laugh | Yuen Siu-Wen |
| 1996 | Who's the Woman, Who's the Man | Lam Chi Wing |
| 1996 | Twinkle Twinkle Lucky Star | Beautiful |
| 1997 | A Chinese Ghost Story: The Tsui Hark Animation | Xiaoqian |
| 1997 | Hong Kong Night Club | Cora |
| 1997 | God of Gamblers 3: The Early Stage | Seven |
| 1997 | He Comes from Planet K | Moon |
| 1997 | Up for the Rising Sun | |
| 1997 | The Wedding Days | Rachel Lam |
| 1998 | Enter the Eagles | Lucy |
| 1998 | Anna Magdalena | Assistant Editor |
| 1998 | Till Death Do Us Part | BoBo |
| 2000 | Don't Look Back... Or You'll Be Sorry!! | Lisa |
| 2000 | Lensman: Power of the Lens | |
| 2000 | Dragon Heat | |
| 2003 | Kung Fu Girls | |
| 2004 | Love Trilogy | Chui |
| 2005 | Love's Lone Flower | Yuanfeng |
| 2007 | Protégé | Kwan's wife |
| 2010 | 72 Tenants of Prosperity | Pinky |
| 2011 | I Love Hong Kong | Pak Su Jun |
| 2013 | Ip Man: The Final Fight | Cheung Wing-sing |
| 2013 | The Love Experience | |
| 2014 | The Deathday Party | Helen Xin Hailun |
| 2015 | I Am Somebody | |
| 2019 | A Home with a View | Mrs.Lu |
| 2019 | Integrity | Guest Role |
| 2019 | Be Water, My Friend | |

=== Television drama ===
| Year | English title | Original title | Role | Network |
|---|---|---|---|---|
| 1991 | Be My Guest | 我愛玫瑰園 | Fong On Yee | TVB |
| 1992 | Angel's Call | 他來自天堂 | Ling Shanshan | TVB |
| 1992 | I'm Mad for Money | 我為錢狂 | Garbage-lady | TVB |
| 1999 | Hua Mulan | 花木兰 | Hua Mulan | CTV |
| 2000 | State of Divinity | 笑傲江湖 | Ren Yingying | CTV |
| 2001 | The New Adventures of Chor Lau Heung | 新楚留香 | Song Xihu | CTS |
| 2002 | Innocently Guilty | 法內有情天 | Lin Tian En | meWATCH |
| 2002 | The Monkey King | 西遊記 | The Goddess of Nine Heaven | TVB |
| 2002 | Mr. Winner | 方謬神探 | You Xiaoqing | TVB, CTV |
| 2004 | The River Flows Eastwards | 一江春水向东流 | Sufen | |
| 2005 | Love's Lone Flower | 孤恋花 | Yun Fang | CTS |
| 2006 | The 36th Chamber of Shaolin | 南少林三十六房 | 吕四娘 | |
| 2008 | Love Exchange | 疑情別戀 | Sit Tze Yiu (Zita) | TVB |
| 2009 | Born Rich | 富貴門 | Cheuk Yat-sam | TVB |
| 2009 | Love in Trouble Time | 亂世艷陽天 | Sam So | ATV |
| 2011 | All Men Are Brothers | 新水浒传 | Lin Chong's wife | |
| 2013 | Longmen Express | 龙门客栈 | Sheng Qiuyue | |
| 2015 | Two Families from Wenzhou | 温州两家人 | Lin Jialai | CCTV |
| 2015 | Royal Romance | 多情江山 | Empress Dowager Zhaosheng | Zhejiang Television |
| 2016 | The Adoption/The Adopt | 领养 | Linda | CCTV-8 |

== Awards and nominations ==
| Year | Award | Nominated work | Category | Result |
|---|---|---|---|---|
| 1993 | 12th Hong Kong Film Awards | The Days of Being Dumb | Best New Performer | Won |
| 1993 | 30th Golden Horse Film Festival and Awards | C'est la vie, mon chéri | Best Actress | Nominated |
| 1994 | 13th Hong Kong Film Awards | C'est la vie, mon chéri | Best Actress | Won |
| 1994 | 18th Hong Kong International Film Festival | C'est la vie, mon chéri | Best Actress | Won |
| 1994 | 1st China Zhuhai Film Festival | C'est la vie, mon chéri | Best Actress | Won |
| 1995 | 14th Hong Kong Film Awards | He's a Woman, She's a Man | Best Actress | Won |
| 1997 | 16th Hong Kong Film Awards | Entrance of the P-Side | Best Supporting Actress | Nominated |
| 1999 | 18th Hong Kong Film Awards | Till Death Do Us Part | Best Actress | Nominated |
| 1999 | 4th Golden Bauhinia Awards | Till Death Do Us Part | Best Actress | Nominated |
| 2008 | 27th Hong Kong Film Awards | Protégé | Best Supporting Actress | Nominated |
| 2009 | 13th TVB Anniversary Awards | Born Rich | Best Actress | Nominated |
| 2009 | 13th TVB Anniversary Awards | Born Rich | My Favourite Female Character | Nominated |
| 2016 | 19th Huading Awards | Two Families from Wenzhou | Best Supporting Actress | Nominated |

Awards and achievements
| Preceded by Monica Chan | Miss Hong Kong; 1990 | Succeeded by Amy Kwok |
| Preceded by Maggie Cheung for Center Stage | Hong Kong Film Awards for Best Actress; 1994 for C'est la vie, mon chéri 1995 for He's a Woman, She's a Man | Succeeded by Josephine Siao for Summer Snow |
