= The Heroic Trio =

1993 Hong Kong film by Johnnie To

- Theatrical release poster
- Directed by: Johnnie To
- Screenplay by: Sandy Shaw
- Produced by: Ching Siu-tung
- Starring: Michelle Yeoh; Anita Mui; Maggie Cheung; Damian Lau; Anthony Wong
- Cinematography: Poon Hang-Sang; Tom Lau
- Edited by: Kam Wah
- Music by: William Hu
- Production companies: China Entertainment Films; Paka Hill Productions
- Release date: 12 February 1993
- Running time: 83 minutes
- Country: Hong Kong
- Language: Cantonese

The Heroic Trio (Dung fong saam hap, TC: 東方三俠, pinyin: dōng fāng sān xiá) is a 1993 Hong Kong fantasy adventure film directed by Johnnie To, from a screenplay by Sandy Shaw, and produced by Ching Siu-tung. The film stars Michelle Yeoh, Anita Mui, and Maggie Cheung as the titular trio. Other cast include Damian Lau, Anthony Wong, Paul Chun, James Pak, and Yan-yee Kwan. It was followed by a sequel, Executioners, also released in 1993.

== Plot ==
An invisible person is kidnapping newborn babies who are destined to be emperors and delivering them to the mysterious, subterranean villain known only as the Evil Master and the police are powerless to do anything. The only hope for the city is a motley trio of women who all share a terrible past, they are: Tung (played by Anita Mui), the mild-mannered wife of a police inspector who secretly fights crime as the sword-slinging, knife-throwing heroine Wonder Woman; Chat (played by Maggie Cheung) a hard-boiled, shotgun-toting bounty hunter who goes by the nickname Thief Catcher; and Ching (played by Michelle Yeoh), the aforementioned Invisible Woman who acts as the troubled but determined right hand of the Evil Master.

== Cast ==
- Michelle Yeoh – Ching/San/Invisible Woman
- Anita Mui – Tung/Wonder Woman
- Maggie Cheung – Chat/Thief Catcher
- Damian Lau – Inspector Lau
- Anthony Wong – Kau
- James Pax – Professor/Inventor
- Paul Chun – Chief of Police
- Yen Shi-Kwan – Evil Master
- Chen Zhuoxin
- Jiang Haowen
- Lee Siu-kei – Leader of robbers at chemical factory
- Pamela Franklin – Chief of Police's Wife

== Production ==
On its release, the film was promoted as a "ground-breaking novelty for Hong Kong cinema". Producer Ching Siu-Tung used the film to try to make a name for himself outside of his work with Tsui Hark while Johnnie To developed it as a pitch to become accepted as one of Hong Kong's leading action film directors.

== Reception ==
Tony Rayns, of Sight & Sound, stated that the film was visually similar to Kirk Wong's Health Warning, but "predictably takes none of that film's risks." He noted that both Mui and Cheung approached "their iconic roles with gusto and deliver the odd camp frisson", while "Yeoh seems dispirited from start to finish." Rayns complimented parts of the film, stating that it "offers a number of simple pleasures. Its design and mise en scene are expansive and occasionally exhilarating, and it has a good sense of intersperse scenes of would-be pathos between its action set-pieces." Variety called the film a "flashy kung fu superheroine adventure full of solid production values but marred by some disturbingly gratuitous plot elements." The review went on to note that the ambitious plot does "not always mesh with recurring comic-book tone. Full-blown climax has heroines battling their nemesis both above and below ground as the villain, as in Terminator 2, continues to struggle even when reduced to skeletal remains."

In his book Horror and Science Fiction Film IV, Donald C. Willis described the film as "an amusing series of outrageous stunts". On Rotten Tomatoes, the film has an aggregated score of 80% based on 10 critic reviews, with an average rating of 6.8/10.
