= Teddy Chan =

Hong Kong filmmaker (born 1958)

- 陳德森
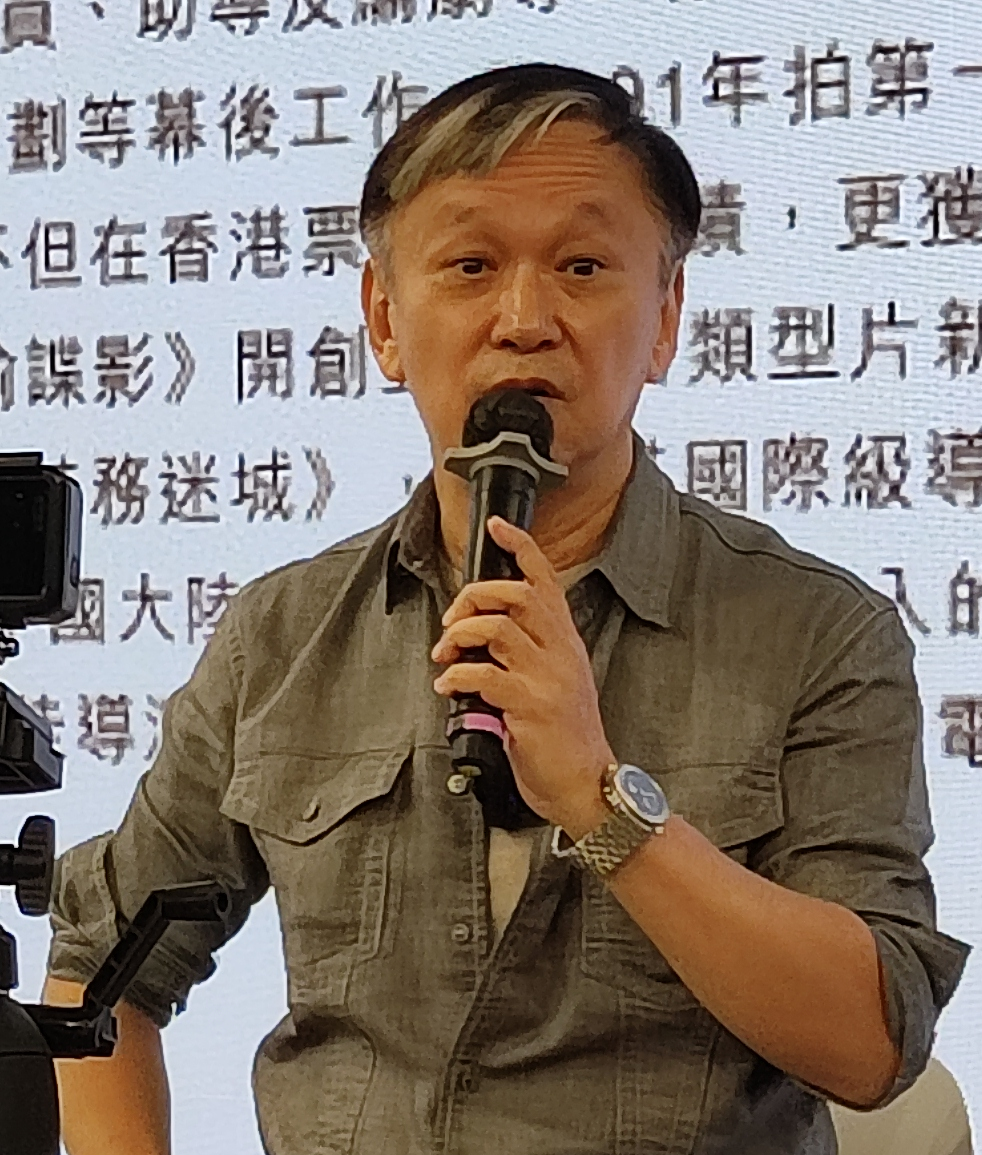
- Chan in October 2022
- Born: Chan Tak-sum; 26 April 1958 (age 68); British Hong Kong
- Education: St. Teresa's School Kowloon; Taipei Municipal Jianguo High School; St. Francis Xavier's College, Tai Kok Tsui
- Occupation: Filmmaker
- Years active: 1970–present
- Notable work: The Accidental Spy; Bodyguards and Assassins

Teddy Chan Tak-sum (Chinese: 陳德森, born 26 April 1958) is a Hong Kong filmmaker.

== Filmography ==
Filmography as director, art director and other positions:

- Man on the Brink 邊緣人 (1981), assistant director
- Twinkle Twinkle Little Star 星際鈍胎 (1983), assistant director
- The Red Panther 害時出世 (1983), assistant director
- The Family Strikes Back 烏龍大家庭 (1986), actor
- The Legend of Wisely 衛斯理傳奇 (1987), assistant director
- Gunmen 天羅地網 (1988), assistant director
- Pretty Ghost 我老婆不是人 (1991), director
- Fight Back to School 逃學威龍 (1991), actor
- The Magic Touch 神算 (1992), actor
- Lover's Tear 誓不忘情 (1992), actor
- Gameboy Kids 機Boy小子之真假威龍 (1992), actor
- Cageman 籠民 (1992), actor
- Arrest the Restless 藍江傳之反飛組風雲 (1992), actor
- Two of a Kind 情人知己 (1993), director
- Tom, Dick And Hairy 風塵三俠 (1993), actor
- Murder 黃蜂尾後針 (1993), actor
- Emotional Girl - Doubt of Distress 那個少女不多情之脫的疑惑 (1993), actor
- C'est la vie, mon chéri 新不了情 (1993), actor
- Twenty Something 晚九朝五 (1994), director
- The True Hero 暴雨驕陽 (1994), brief appearance
- In the Heat of Summer 點指兵兵之青年干探 (1994), director, producer, production manager
- Hello ! Who Is It ? 喂，搵邊位？ (1994), actor
- Chuang Zha Ma Mi a.k.a. The Meaning of Life 搶閘媽咪 (1995), actor
- Full Throttle 烈火戰車 (1995), producer
- Viva Erotica 色情男女 (1996), brief appearance
- Lost and Found 天涯海角 (1996), brief appearance
- The Log 三個受傷的警察 (1996), writer
- Hong Kong Showgirls 鬼劇院之驚青艷女郎 (1996), actor
- Black Mask 黑俠 (1996), writer
- Ah Kam 阿金 (1996), actor
- Downtown Torpedoes 神偷諜影 (1997), director
- A True Mob Story 龍在江湖 (1998), actor
- Purple Storm 紫雨風暴 (1999), director, original story
- The Accidental Spy 特務迷城 (2001), director
- 1:99 Shorts 1:99 電影行動 (segment: "Always Look on the Bright Side") (2003), director, writer
- Project 1:99 (2003), director
- Infernal Affairs II (2003), actor
- Hidden Track 尋找周杰倫 (2003), producer
- Wait 'Til You're Older 童夢奇緣 (2005), director, producer
- Chaos 三不管 (2008), producer
- Bodyguards and Assassins 十月圍城 (2009), director
- Kung Fu Jungle 一个人的武林 (2014), director
- Double World 征途 (2020), director
