= Carrie Ng =

Hong Kong actress

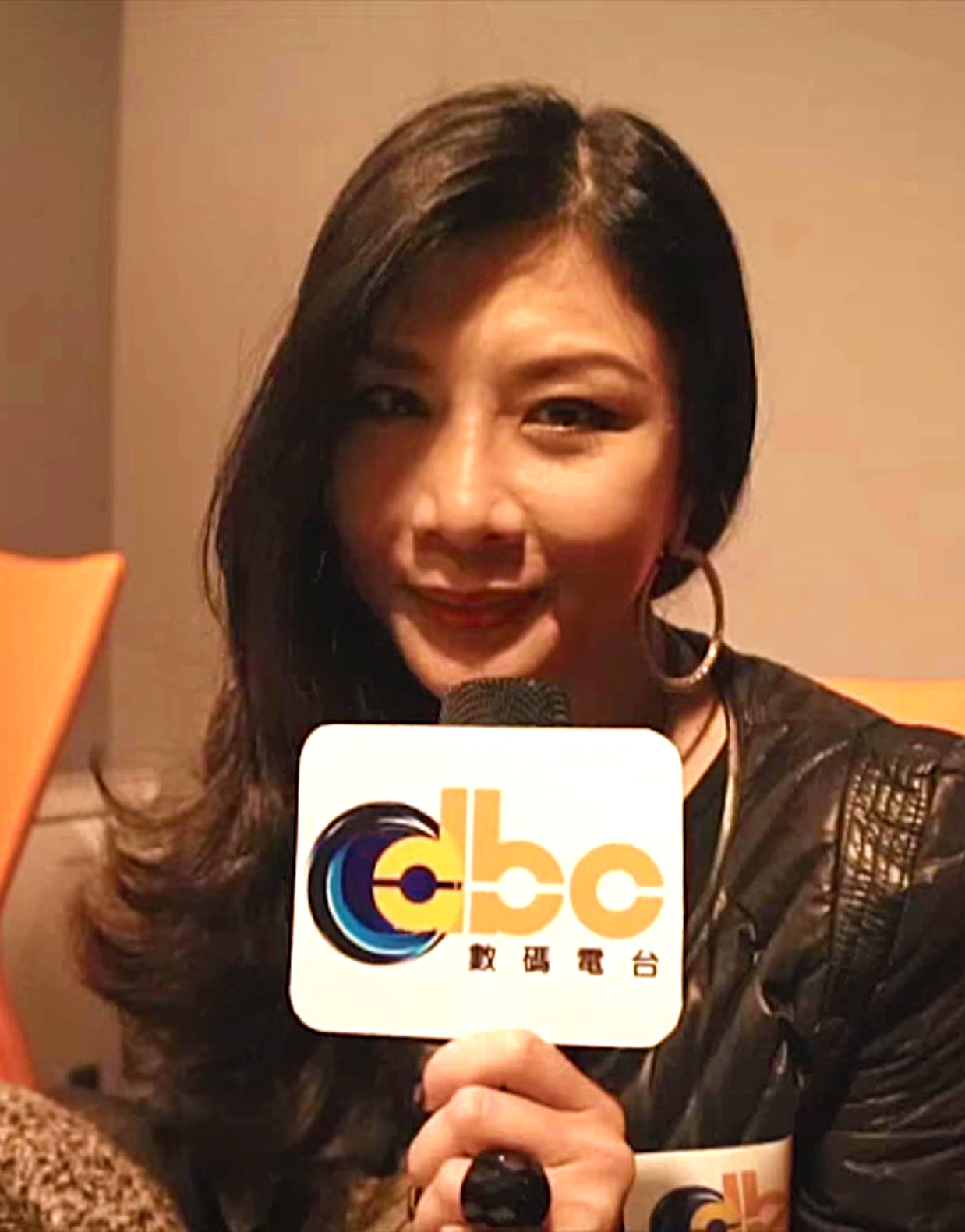
- Ng in 2014
- Born: 24 February 1963 (age 63); Kowloon, Hong Kong
- Occupation: Actress
- Years active: 1986–present
- Awards: Hong Kong Film Awards – Best Supporting Actress 2000 The Kid; Golden Horse Awards – Best Actress 1993 Remains of a Woman

Chinese name
- Traditional Chinese: 吳家麗
- Simplified Chinese: 吴家丽
Transcriptions
Standard Mandarin
- Hanyu Pinyin: Wú Jiālǐ
Yue: Cantonese
- Jyutping: Ng4 Gaa1lai6
- Musical career
- Also known as: Ka-Lai Ng

Carrie Ng (born 1963) is a Hong Kong actress well known for both Category-III cult and mainstream films. She won Best Actress at the 1993 Golden Horse Film Festival awards for her performance in Remains of a Woman and Best Supporting Actress at the 2000 Hong Kong Film Awards for The Kid. Other notable film credits include Edward Yang's Mahjong (1996) and cult classics Sex and Zen (1991) and Naked Killer (1992).

Ng made her directorial debut with the revenge-thriller Angel Whispers (2015), which she co-directed, produced and scripted with film executive Shirley Yung.

== Selected filmography ==
=== Films ===
- City on Fire (1987)
- Call Girl'88 (1988)
- The First Time is the Last Time (1989)
- Sentenced to Hang (1989)
- Till We Meet Again (1991)
- Crystal Hunt (film) (1991)
- Sex and Zen (1991)
- Naked Killer (1992)
- Cheetah on Fire (1992)
- Justice, My Foot! (1992)
- Changing Partner (1992)
- Angel Terminators (1992)
- Remains of a Woman (1993)
- C'est la vie, mon chéri (1993)
- The Lovers (1994)
- Right Here Waiting (1994)
- Passion Unbounded (1995)
- The Eighth (1996)
- Mahjong (1996)
- The Kid (2000)
- Red Nights (2009)
- Hi, Fidelity (2011)
- The Silent War (2012)
- Aberdeen (2014)
- Hungry Ghost Ritual (2014)
- Gangster Payday (2014)
- Angel Whispers (2015) [co-directed with Shirley Yung]
- Knock Knock Who's There? (2015) [co-directed and starring in《種貓》]
- Zombiology: Enjoy Yourself Tonight (2017)
- Prison Flowers (2019)
- Undercover Punch and Gun (2019)

=== Television series ===
- Iron Ladies (2020) - Queenie, Main Role
- Generation Slash (2021) - Stella (EP15-18)

== Awards and nominations ==
Golden Horse Film Festival
Year	Film	Result	Award	Category
1993	Remains of a Woman	Won	Golden Horse Award	Best Actress

Hong Kong Film Awards
Year	Film	Result	Award	Category
1988	City on Fire	Nominated	Hong Kong Film Awards	Best Supporting Actress
1990	The First Time is the Last Time	Nominated	Hong Kong Film Awards	Best Actress
1992	Till We Meet Again	Nominated	Hong Kong Film Awards	Best Supporting Actress
1994	Remains of a Woman	Nominated	Hong Kong Film Awards	Best Actress
1994	C'est la vie, mon chéri	Nominated	Hong Kong Film Awards	Best Supporting Actress
1995	The Lovers	Nominated	Hong Kong Film Awards	Best Supporting Actress
2000	The Kid	Won	Hong Kong Film Awards	Best Supporting Actress
