= A Better Tomorrow =

1986 Hong Kong film by John Woo

- Theatrical release poster
- Traditional Chinese: 英雄本色
- Simplified Chinese: 英雄本色
- Literal meaning: true colours of a hero
- Hanyu Pinyin: Yīngxióng běnsè
- Jyutping: Jing^{1}Hung^{4} Bun^{2}Sik^{1}
- Directed by: John Woo
- Screenplay by: John Woo; Chan Hing-ka; Leung Suk-wah
- Produced by: John Woo; Tsui Hark
- Starring: Ti Lung; Leslie Cheung; Chow Yun-fat; Emily Chu; Waise Lee; Kenneth Tsang
- Cinematography: Horace Wong
- Edited by: Ma Kam; David Wu
- Music by: Joseph Koo
- Production companies: Cinema City Enterprises; Film Workshop
- Distributed by: Golden Princess Amusement
- Release date: 2 August 1986
- Running time: 95 minutes
- Country: Hong Kong
- Language: Cantonese
- Budget: HK$11 million
- Box office: HK$34.7 million (US$4.4 million)

A Better Tomorrow (Chinese: 英雄本色; Jyutping: Jing1 Hung4 Bun2 Sik1; lit. 'true colours of a hero') is a 1986 Hong Kong action film directed and produced by John Woo, with a screenplay by Woo, Chan Hing-ka, and Leung Suk-wah. The film stars Ti Lung, Leslie Cheung, Chow Yun-fat, Emily Chu, and Waise Lee. Ti plays Ho, a triad gangster and money counterfeiter who is sent to prison after being betrayed by his subordinate, Shing (Lee). After his release, Ho tries to reform himself and reconcile with his estranged brother Kit (Cheung), a police officer who resents him for his criminal past. Ho becomes torn between trying and failing to make amends with Kit, and following the advice of his friend Mark (Chow) to seek revenge for Shing's treachery.

The plot was heavily influenced by The Story of a Discharged Prisoner (1967), a film admired by both Woo and producer Tsui Hark. After forming Film Workshop in 1984, Tsui asked Woo to write and direct a dramatic crime film. Woo saw this as his chance to break away from directing comedies for Cinema City and developed the story based on Discharged Prisoner, adding his own ideas about honour and loyalty inspired by wuxia and the work of Jean-Pierre Melville. After convincing Cinema City to co-produce, Woo and Tsui began filming in February 1986, working with a budget of under HK$11 million. The majority of filming took place in Hong Kong, with some exterior shots filmed in Taiwan, and concluded in May 1986 after 80 to 100 days of filming.

Released during a time when comedy films were popular in Hong Kong, Cinema City was expecting A Better Tomorrow to be a box-office bomb due to its dramatic tone and lack of a popular cast. However, it defied expectations and achieved immediate commercial success upon its release on 2 August 1986, earning over HK$34 million during its extended theatrical run. Critics praised the action sequences, Woo's direction, and the performances of its cast. The film was nominated for numerous accolades, winning two Hong Kong Film Awards and three Golden Horse Awards.

A Better Tomorrow has been influential on action films since its release. Its stylised, balletic gunplay is considered the original source of gun fu fight sequences. The movie's popularity led Hong Kong film producers to introduce more melodramatic elements into their crime films, leading to the emergence of the heroic bloodshed film genre. A Better Tomorrow is considered by critics to be one of the greatest action movies, with a Hong Kong Film Awards panel ranking it second in its list of The Best 100 Chinese Motion Pictures in 2005. Its box office success spawned a direct sequel, A Better Tomorrow II (1987), a prequel entitled A Better Tomorrow III: Love & Death in Saigon (1989), and two official remakes: one in South Korea released in 2010 and one in mainland China in 2018.

== Plot ==
Triad member Ho (Note: Sung Tse-ho (宋子豪) and Sung Tse-kit (宋子杰) are the brothers' full names, with "Tse" being their generation name. In the film, they are informally referred to by their friends and close acquaintances as "Ah Ho" (阿豪) and "Ah Kit" (阿杰), which reflects how Cantonese speakers use the prefix "ah" to show familiarity with someone. For brevity, these two characters will be referred to by their given names, Ho and Kit.) and his best friend, Mark Lee, run a money counterfeiting business for their boss, Mr. Yiu. This activity is kept secret from Ho's younger brother Kit, a police cadet. Out of respect for their ailing father, Ho promises to stop being a gangster after completing his next business deal. At Mr. Yiu's request, Ho lets a subordinate named Shing accompany him to Taiwan to conduct business with a local mob. However, the gang ambushes them, causing a shootout that alerts the Taiwanese police. Ho tells Shing to escape while he surrenders. To ensure Ho doesn't implicate anyone, the Taiwanese gang sends a kidnapper to abduct his father. In the scuffle between Kit, his girlfriend Jackie, and the kidnapper, Ho and Kit's father is fatally stabbed. Before he dies, the father begs Kit to forgive his brother, but a furious Kit blames Ho for their father's death. Mark travels to Taiwan to exact revenge on the gangsters, shooting them dead in a restaurant. However, he is shot twice in his right leg, leaving him crippled and needing a leg brace to walk.

Ho is released from prison after serving a three-year sentence. Determined to start anew, he gets a job driving for a taxi company run by ex-convict Ken. Ho finds out that Shing has climbed the ranks of the triad during his imprisonment, usurping Mark's position and status. He is devastated to learn that Mark, who had hidden the extent of his condition in his letters to Ho, has been cast aside by Shing after becoming disabled. Not wanting to be dragged back into crime, Ho refuses to confront his former protégé, opting to try and reconcile with Kit. However, Kit resents the fact that his familial connection to Ho is preventing his promotion at work. In an effort to prove to his superiors that he can be trusted, Kit becomes obsessed with bringing down Shing, despite Ho's warnings.

Hoping to expand the triad's operations into drug trafficking, Shing tries to persuade Ho to rejoin the triad. He tells Ho that they stand to make a lot of money if Kit is turned into a corrupt policeman. When Ho refuses, Shing has his men raid the taxi company, beat Mark nearly to death, and shoot Kit after luring him into a trap. After Mark and Ho narrowly escape arrest, Mark pleads with Ho to stand up for himself and fight Shing. Fed up with his friend's unwillingness, Mark steals a computer tape containing printing plate data from the counterfeiting business. Having a change of heart, Ho shows up on a motorbike to collect the tape. After using it to blackmail Shing for US$2 million and an escape boat to leave Hong Kong on, Ho transfers the tape to Kit to use as proof of Shing's crimes.

Through a conversation with Mr. Yiu, Shing reveals that he was the one who set up the ambush in Taiwan. After lying to his boss about a negotiation with Ho, Shing kills Mr. Yiu, coercing the witnesses to frame Ho as the murderer. At the ransom exchange site, Ho and Mark take Shing hostage and drive to a pier, where the boat is guarded by Shing's men. Ho implores Mark to escape by himself in the boat. Kit arrives to arrest Shing, but is taken hostage by the gangster's men. The two parties try to exchange Shing for Kit, but it quickly devolves into a shootout. Hearing the sound of gunfire, Mark comes back to help, and the three of them kill most of Shing's henchmen. After seeing Kit rebuff his brother’s attempts at reconciliation again, Mark berates him, telling him that Ho's present actions have made up for his past sins. Mid-speech, Mark is shot from behind and killed by Shing and his remaining enforcer.

Ho kills Shing's last henchman, but runs out of ammunition as the police approach. Shing mocks the two brothers, stating that his money and influence will ensure his swift release from custody. Finally forgiving his brother, Kit hands Ho his revolver, and Ho shoots Shing dead. As redemption for his crimes, Ho handcuffs himself to Kit, and the two walk towards the gathered crowd of police together.

== Cast ==
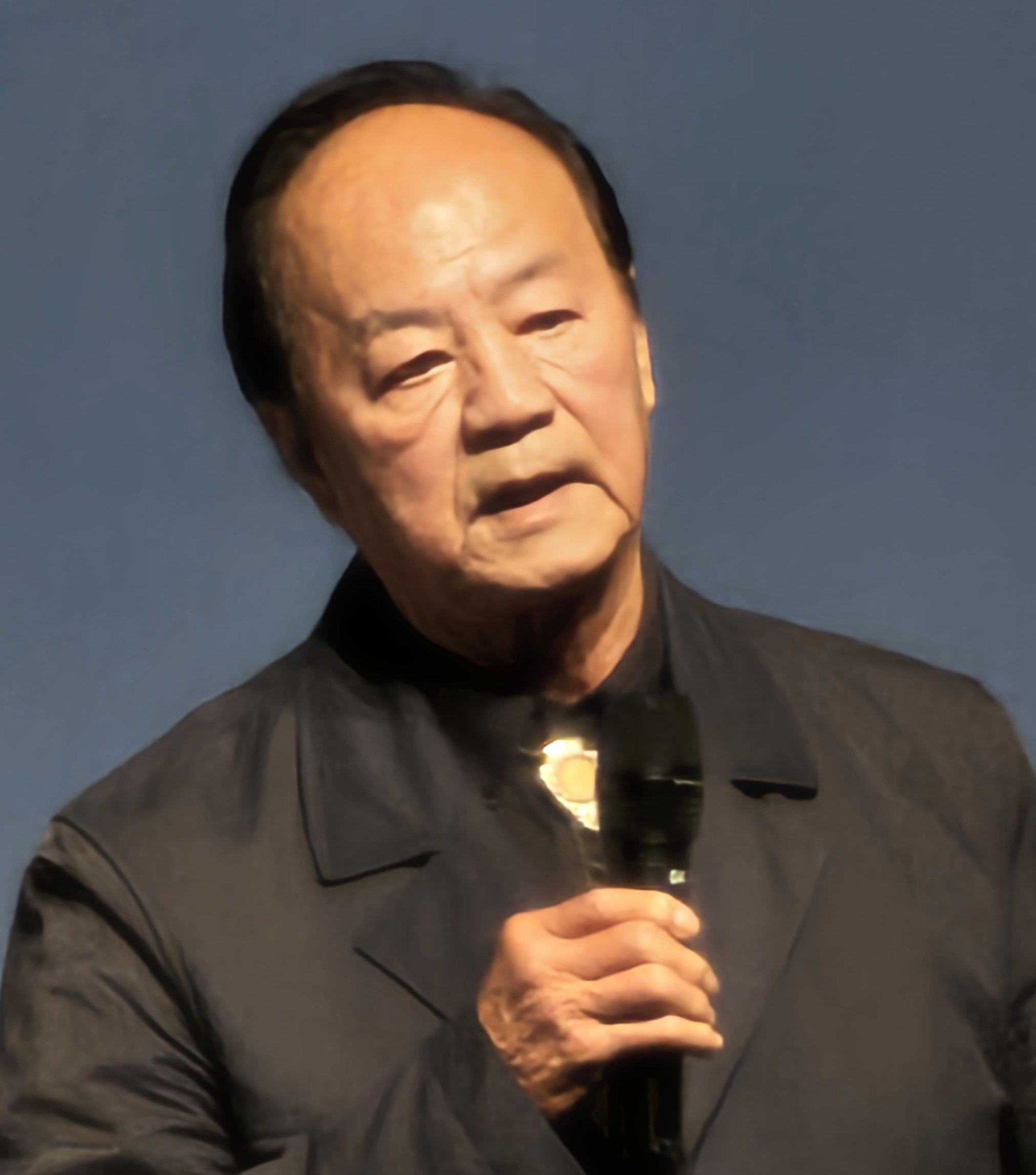
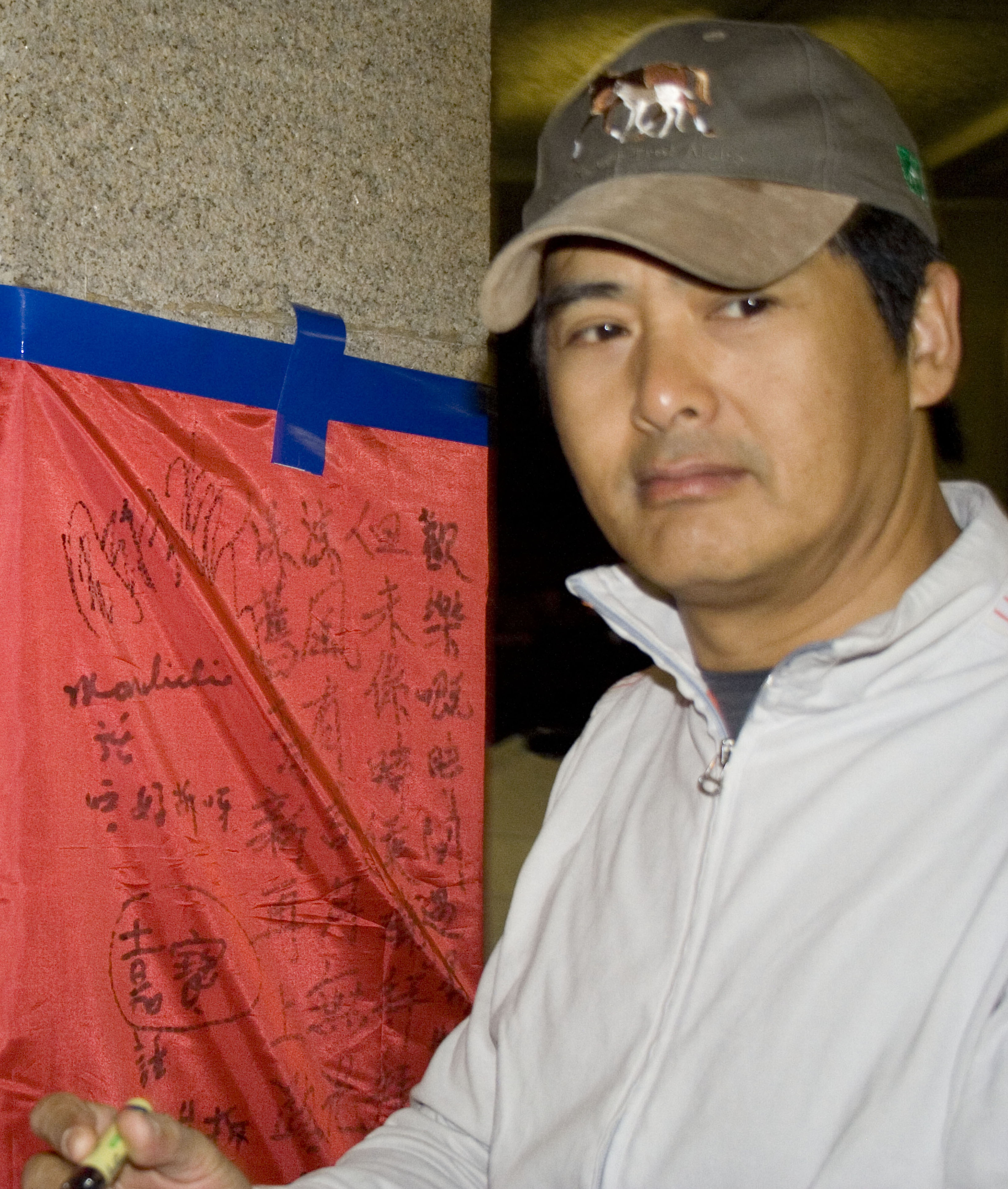
Ti Lung in 2026 and Chow Yun-fat in 2007
- Ti Lung as Sung Tse-ho (宋子豪): A triad member and Kit's older brother
- Leslie Cheung as Sung Tse-kit (宋子傑): A police officer and Ho's younger brother
- Chow Yun-fat as Mark Lee (李馬克): (Note: Mark is usually addressed in the film with the honorific gor (哥; go1; 'older brother'). This is both common parlance amongst triad members, as well as an indication of his brotherly relationship with Ho. Additionally, Mark is sometimes referred to as 小馬哥 (siu2 maa5 go1; 'little Mark brother').) Ho's best friend and business partner
- Emily Chu as Jackie (鍾柔): Kit's girlfriend
- Waise Lee as Shing (譚成): An ambitious, low-ranking triad member
- Kenneth Tsang as Ken (堅叔): An ex-convict and the manager of the taxi company Ho joins
- Sek Yin-tsi as Mr. Yiu (姚先生): A senior triad leader and Ho and Mark's boss
- Tien Feng as Ho and Kit's father (宋景文)
- Shing Fui-on as Shing's lieutenant
- Leung Ming as Ming (明叔): A technician overseeing the counterfeiting operation
- Wang Hsieh as a Taiwanese triad boss

Additionally, the film also includes cameo appearances from Woo, who plays a Taiwanese policeman named Inspector Wu, and Tsui as a music judge.

== Production ==
=== Conception ===
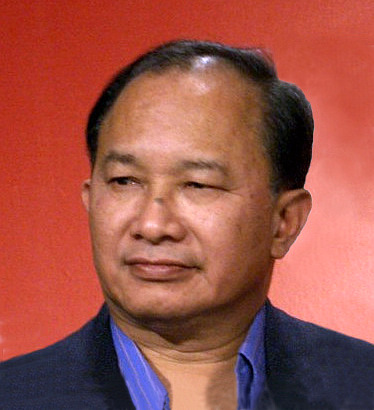
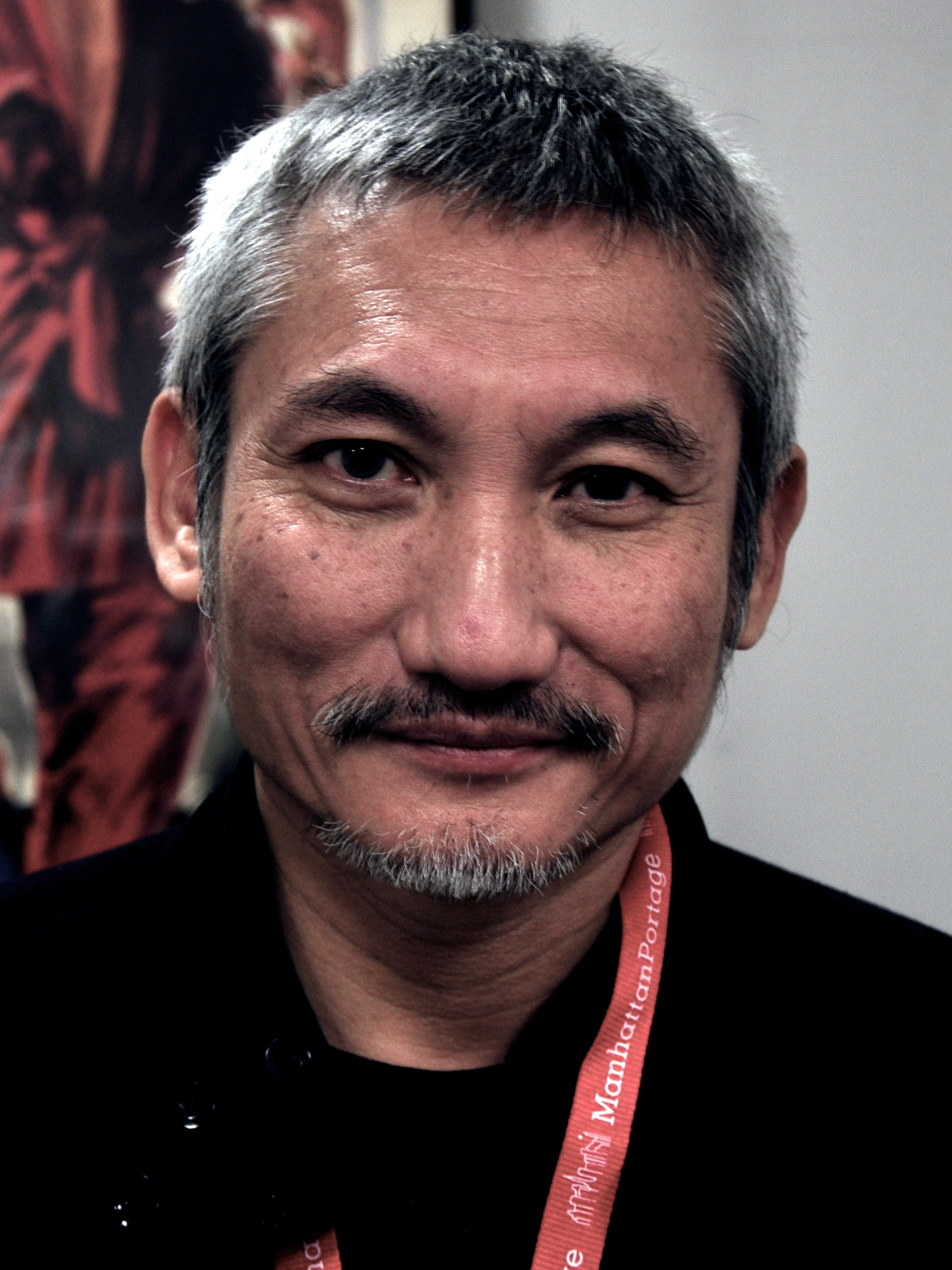
John Woo in 2005 and Tsui Hark in 2011

The primary inspiration for A Better Tomorrow was Patrick Lung's The Story of a Discharged Prisoner (1967), a film which John Woo and Tsui Hark both greatly admired. According to film critic Law Kar, Woo had witnessed Lung directing the movie at Wader Film Studio; Tsui meanwhile, had seen it as a teenager and was impressed by the film's handling of social issues. Lung's movies eventually influenced Tsui to venture into filmmaking by creating short films. Throughout his career, Tsui kept Discharged Prisoner on his mind, and considered making a dramatic work inspired by it. He first suggested an adaptation of Lung's film in the mid-1970s while working at TVB, but his idea was ignored. Years later, Tsui would propose a similar project to the studio he was contracted with, Cinema City. Due to Cinema City's commercial success with formulaic comedies, they refused, stating that local audiences would not want to watch such a serious movie.

Undeterred by the rejection, Tsui founded the production company Film Workshop in April 1984 with his wife, Nansun Shi. Tsui then approached his friend Woo, who had helped kickstart his directing career by getting him initial contract work with Cinema City, to come write and direct a gangster film. Woo himself had been feeling burnt out while working in Taiwan for Cinema City. He had originally signed with the studio in hopes of getting more directorial freedom, but had instead been shunted into doing administrative work, stopping only to churn out a couple of company-mandated comedies for money. Woo was frustrated by his potential future, as he had desperately wanted to make a gangster film instead. In a 2025 interview with Variety, he stated, "Before A Better Tomorrow, I didn't have much chance to try this kind of a style. Because I never got any support from the studio or anyone, I wasn't able to experiment." Intrigued by Tsui's offer, he came back to Hong Kong in 1985, but was surprised by a perceived cultural shift when he arrived. Woo noted that there had been "gangster infiltration into all kinds of businesses—even the film industry—and a widespread feeling that there were no morals left, that many people would do anything to get ahead." Taken aback by this, Woo decided that he would direct a film that would bring back and highlight "true values, like honour and chivalry".

=== Writing and development ===
Inspired by Jean-Pierre Melville, Woo began writing A Better Tomorrow with the goal of making it his own version of Le Samouraï (1967). Encouraged by Tsui to draw upon his own personal experiences to write the film's dialogue, Woo considered A Better Tomorrow to be his first auteur movie. He meant for the film to be a way for him to express his feelings about Hong Kong and human dignity, and didn't intend for it to be a political statement. Woo also wanted it to showcase his friendship with Tsui, since both men had helped each other gain a foothold in their respective directing careers.

Woo was influenced by the gallant tales of wuxia, remarking that films like A Better Tomorrow "are violent, but they also have an element of romance—not love, but chivalry—and there's always the dream of a better world." He noted the impact that a previous directorial effort, Last Hurrah for Chivalry (1979), had on him, calling it a prequel to A Better Tomorrow. While Woo used the basic plot of The Story of a Discharged Prisoner as the foundation for his film, including copying the Chinese title directly, he made specific changes to the story's characters. Woo turned the younger brother into a police officer in order to heighten the drama between the siblings, and reworked the original film's social worker character to be Mark. Since Woo was a fan of Nicholas Ray's Rebel Without a Cause (1955), he wrote Kit to be an homage to James Dean's character. More notably, most of the characters in the original were rewritten to be male roles, despite Tsui's request to include female protagonists. Tsui admitted that there was friction between him and Woo, stating that from a production standpoint: "I get too involved in the project, and there is not enough room for some directors to breathe. John Woo is very much independent."

In addition to Woo, Chan Hing-ka and Leung Suk-wah (梁淑華) also received writing credits for the screenplay. Chan was enlisted by one of the film's production managers, who remembered his work co-writing the TVB television series The Battle Among the Clans (1985). His primary screenplay contribution was introducing a romantic relationship between Kit and Jackie, as Woo and Tsui wanted the younger characters in the film to get more screen time. For the film's English title, Woo asked Nansun Shi for a phrase that better reflected the film's themes of redemption and courage, shortening her suggestion of "For a Better Tomorrow".

Once Woo agreed to direct and have Tsui handle production duties, Tsui was able to persuade Cinema City to finance the movie despite the poor box office performance of Woo's previous films. Film executive Karl Maka approved the project after being convinced of its concept and marketability. Joining Woo on the production was editor Ma Kam (金馬) and cinematographer Wong Wing-hang (黃永恆). Blackie Ko and Stephen Tung were hired as the film's action designers. Patrick Leung was the assistant director to Woo. For the art direction, Woo employed Bennie Lui (雷志良), who was assisted by Tim Yip. Yip was a 21-year-old photographer who Tsui recommended after the producer saw his photography work in an exhibition.

=== Casting ===
[Chow Yun-fat] had been acting in different things. I had seen him in one movie where he played a kind of retired killer and I liked him. And then I found out some things about him, that he always helped a lot of people. That he cared about people in his private life, that he helped his friends. And the more I heard the more I thought he was very much the same as my hero in the story.

— John Woo, 1999 interview with Lee Server

While Tsui had wanted to include women in the movie's leading roles—he expressed interest in getting Michelle Yeoh to play a female version of Mark—the film was greenlit based on the selection of three male leads: Chow Yun-fat, Ti Lung, and Leslie Cheung. In an interview with Apple Daily, Raymond Wong Pak-ming, a co-founder of Cinema City, said that the role of Mark had initially been offered to George Lam. However, Lam declined as he was already working for D&B Films. According to the Hong Kong Economic Times, Mark Cheng was next considered, but he was unavailable as he was filming Tsui's Peking Opera Blues (1986). Instead, Woo considered casting Chow, believing that his talent, charisma, and off-screen generosity would be perfect for the role of "a modern knight". However, Cinema City initially balked at the proposal. While Chow was a popular television actor for TVB, his film roles had been so commercially unsuccessful that he had developed an industry reputation as "box office poison". (Note: Attributed to multiple sources.) Additionally, Chow was not available at first due to scheduling conflicts, but Woo and Tsui both insisted on waiting for the actor to finish his previous commitments.

For the role of Ho, Woo wanted Ti, a skilled martial artist best-known as a 1970s wuxia film star for Chang Cheh at Shaw Brothers Studio. However, Ti's career had been slumping as audience interest in martial arts films declined by the early 1980s, and when Shaw Brothers halted film production in 1986 to focus on television, he was left struggling for work. Like with Chow, Tsui and Woo also had to navigate around the actor's filming schedule. Ti had grown a ponytail for his role in The Legend of Wisely (1987), and could not cut his hair short for A Better Tomorrow's jail sequences. Tsui recalled that Wisely director Teddy Robin became furious with him after he asked the director to let Ti wear a fake ponytail so that he could do both films. However, Ti was interested in the part because he found the script's focus on brotherhood intriguing, and found a compromise with Robin by getting a mid-length haircut.

Cheung, a famous Cantopop star trying to establish himself as a film actor, was cast as Kit to convince Cinema City executives that the project was financially viable. The singer had earned commercial acclaim for his music career, having one of his songs, "Wild Wind" (不羈的風), earn a Gold Song award at the Jade Solid Gold Best Ten Music Awards Presentation in 1985. Cheung had also showcased strong acting performances in television dramas on TVB, as well as various films that cast him for his boyish charm. By playing Kit, he would act as a foil for Chow and Ti's characters by injecting the film with a youthful presence. Terence Chang, a general manager at Film Workshop at the time, said that he and Woo both noticed Cheung's potential when casting him. At a 2017 film festival panel, Woo said that he liked Cheung's "rebellious" quality, stating that Kit was essentially a role where Cheung was playing himself.

Rounding out the main cast was Emily Chu, who played Kit's girlfriend Jackie, and Waise Lee as Shing. Chu had previously starred alongside Chow in Witch From Nepal (1986), playing the titular character Sheila. Lee, a civil servant who worked part-time as a model, caught Tsui's attention after attending a casting call for a television commercial organised by Tsui's company; A Better Tomorrow was his first film role. Woo remembered that he and Tsui wanted Shing to be an atypical antagonist, and thus sought to avoid the clichéd portrayal of the character as an aging veteran criminal. Woo thought that Lee's "ordinary" appearance fit their description of someone the audience would see in everyday life.

=== Filming and post-production ===
Principal photography began in February 1986 with a budget of under HK$11 million. The film was shot in multiple locations across Hong Kong, with some exterior location filming in Taiwan. Due to the film's limited budget, cinematographer Horace Wong had to shoot the nighttime scenes with minimal lighting, as the production could not afford to rent lights.

The film shoot was at times emotional for Woo; Cheung recalled that the director would sometimes cry on set. Tsui remembered the production being subject to significant alterations, stating that "everything was on an unstable basis, sort of like walking on a boat—everything is moving, shaking, unbalanced." When the actor they had cast as Inspector Wu struggled with delivering a suitable performance, Woo decided to step into the role himself, allowing both Chow and Cheung to direct him. While the director bemoaned his own acting abilities, he believed that the character needed to be in the film "to show that morally things are not always black and white."

One of the most notable changes during filming was Chow's involvement in the movie. The actor was initially slated to be on set for only 10 to 15 days as Mark. However, as Woo and Chow bonded over their similar values and industry struggles, Woo gradually expanded the actor's supporting role after realizing how capable Chow was at playing Mark. (Note: Attributed to multiple sources.) Chow, who had been emotionally connecting with the film's dialogue, was also similarly impressed by the production. He allowed Woo additional days to shoot with him for free when things went over budget. Woo gave Chow considerable improvisational freedom, accepting the actor's suggestion to give Mark a toothpick to put in his mouth in order to make him seem cooler. Woo also used Chow's real-life experience with Ringo Lam as the basis for the scene where Mark recalls how he and Ho were forced to drink urine at gunpoint. According to the director, Chow recounted that he and Lam were coerced into drinking an entire bottle of alcohol after Lam unintentionally insulted the owner of the restaurant they were dining at. Chow was not the only actor to draw upon his life experiences to use in his performance. Ti stated in interviews that he used his close friendship with fellow Shaw Brothers actor Alexander Fu Sheng as the basis for Ho and Kit's relationship.

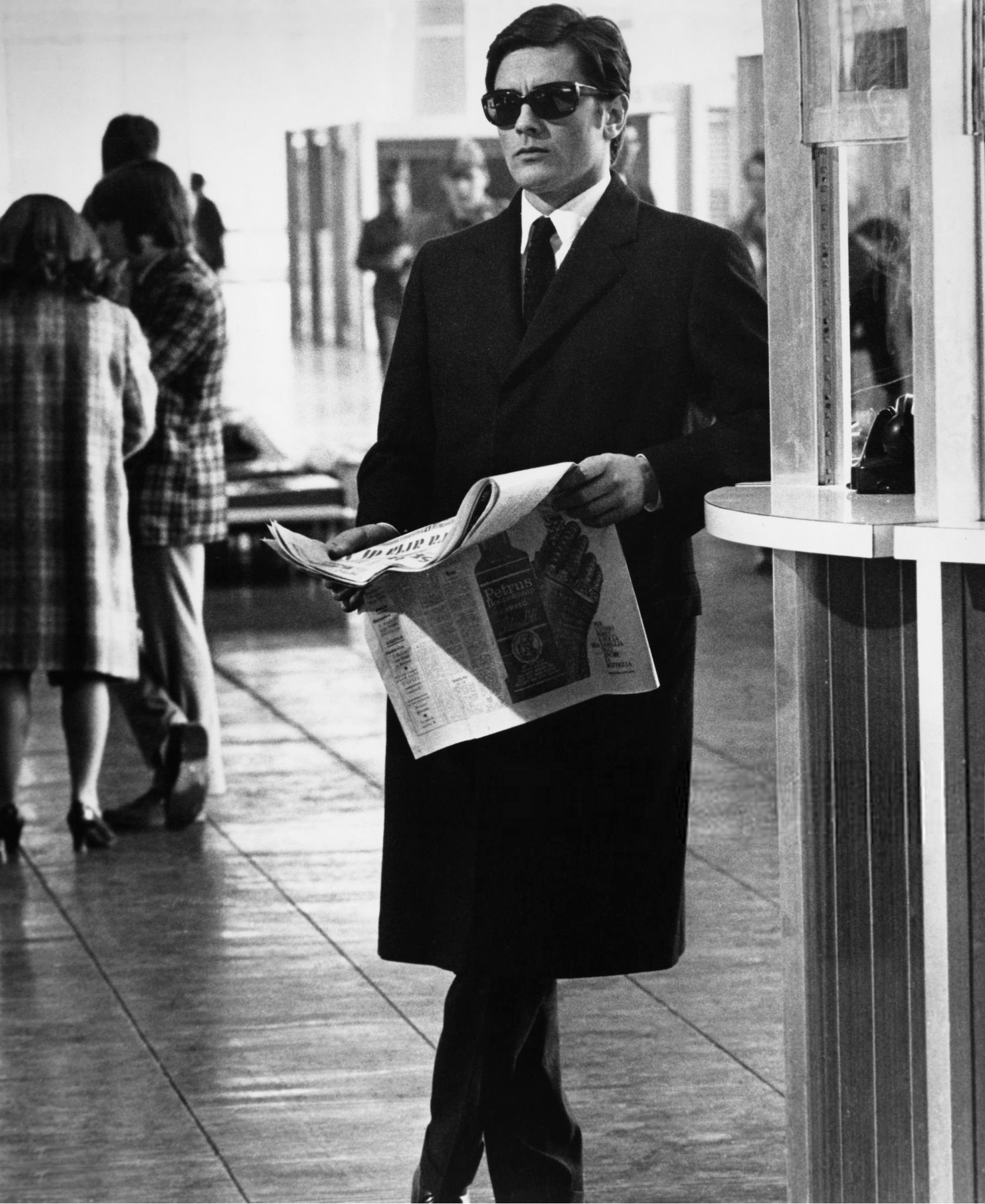
Alain Delon in The Sicilian Clan (1969). Woo would use Delon and other actors as inspiration for Mark.

The overarching design goals during production were to make the film feel modern and glamorous. Art director Bennie Lui recalled, "John Woo wants it to be as gritty as Taxi Driver, but Tsui Hark wants it to be urban and urbane." To fulfill Woo's requirement that the actors "look good in slow motion", Bruce Yu, the film's costume designer, dressed the cast in Armani clothing. Yu was responsible for conceiving Mark's coat-and-sunglasses look, an outfit that combined the styles of several of Woo's cinema idols. Mark would wear a trench coat like the one worn by Alain Delon's character from Le Samourai, sport Ray-Ban sunglasses similar to ones worn by Ken Takakura, and shoot guns like Steve McQueen and Clint Eastwood. Some of the costume design choices were symbolic. Woo stated that Shing was dressed in white to symbolise his former purity as an innocent person who "got trapped by the dark side of life". According to Bey Logan on the DVD commentary, the black leather jacket Ho wears midway through the film is a callback to a similar jacket worn by Patrick Lung's character in The Story of a Discharged Prisoner.

Woo wanted to highlight the violence in the film to "make the audiences sense the invisible and widespread power of the underworld". Assistant art director Tim Yip used The Godfather's suave portrayal of the mafia as inspiration. The film's gunfights were partially inspired by the continual confrontations between good and evil in Westerns, as well as the martial arts choreography from wuxia films. Woo has stated that A Better Tomorrow was the first time he tried incorporating dual wielding pistols in a film. The idea stemmed from discussions he had with the prop master on the logistics of Mark killing 15 people in the restaurant shootout. Woo wanted his hero to use a handgun because he felt they possessed a "great spirit" to them that was reminiscent of Chinese swords. After being excited by the percussive qualities of the firing of a Beretta, he realised that two pistols could rhythmically communicate Mark's anger in combat. To emphasise the power of the handguns, six different sounds were layered on top of each other for the film's gunfire sound effects.

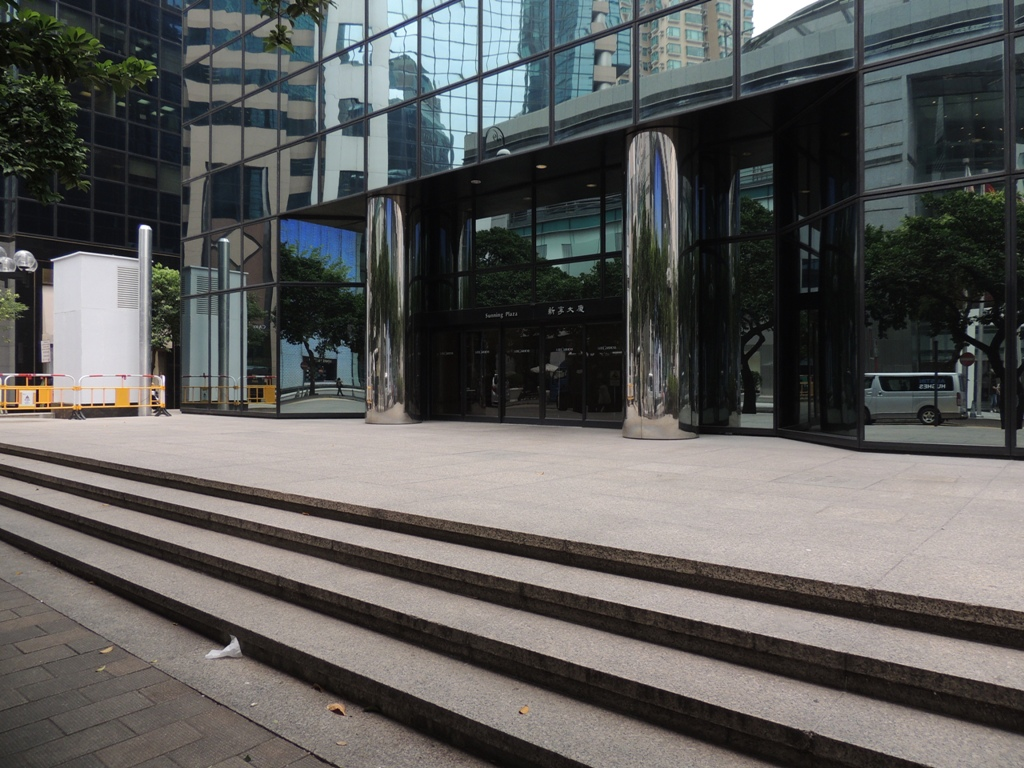
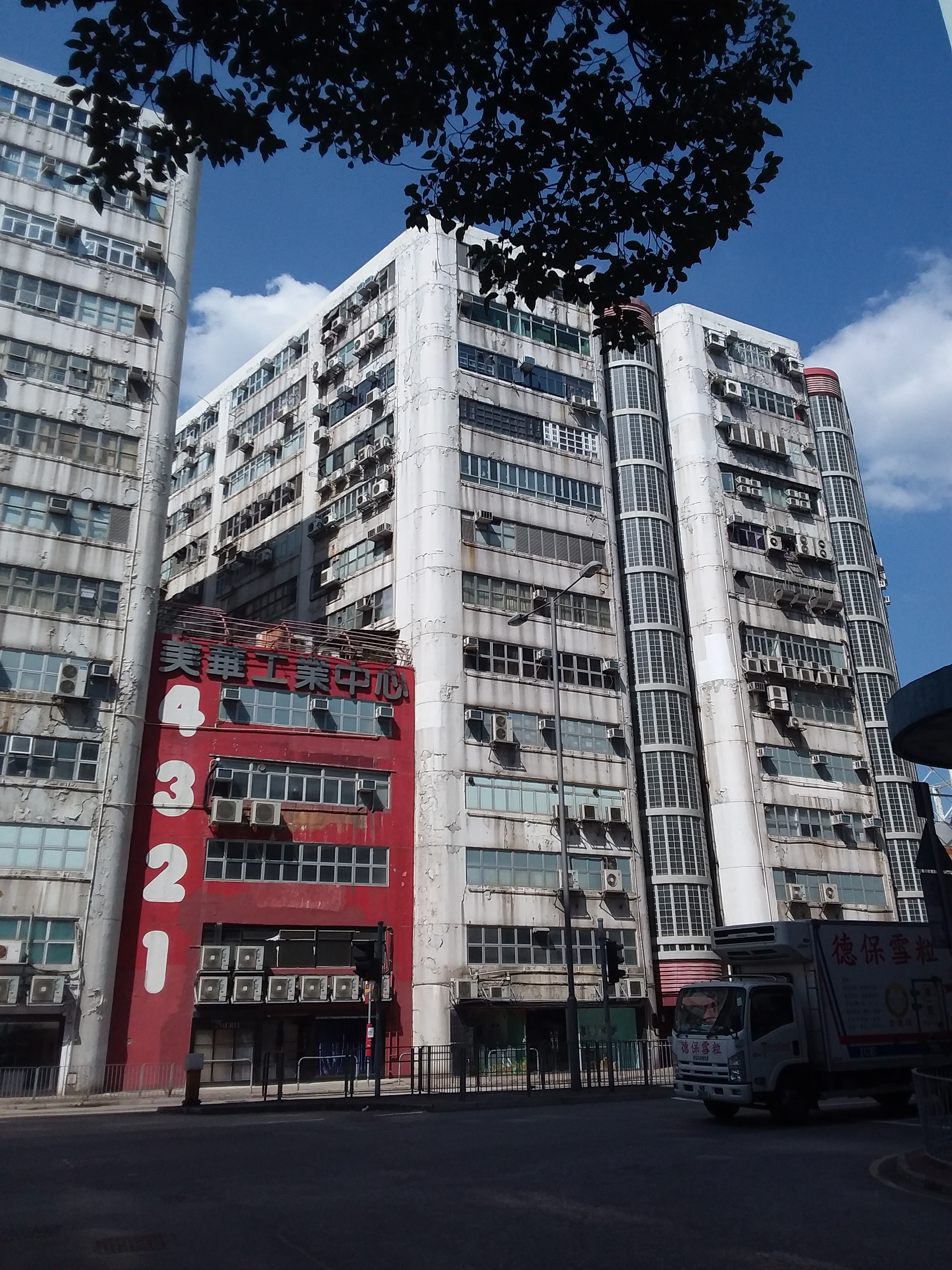
The entrance of Sunning Plaza in 2013, and the Merit Industrial Centre (red building) in 2021

Many locations throughout Hong Kong were used during shooting. The scene where Mark is first seen buying rice noodle rolls from a street vendor was shot on Jackson Road in Central. According to film historian Gary Wong, the exterior shot of the hospital Ho's father is staying at was actually filmed outside of Christ the King Chapel, a building within the St. Paul's Convent Church compound. The scene where Ho sees Shing mistreat Mark was shot outside Sunning Plaza. The underground car park shootout was filmed at the Merit Industrial Centre (美華工業中心) in To Kwa Wan. The Tin Hau Temple in Joss House Bay was used as the site of the ransom exchange between Shing, Ho and Mark. Other filming locations include the former Central Police Station, the Wo Hop Shek Public Cemetery, and the shipyards in Aberdeen. Logan states that due to the necessity of using a local stunt team, the scene where Ho and Shing get double-crossed in Taipei was actually shot in the New Territories, with the exterior shots of the Taiwanese police cars filmed separately in Taiwan. Also filmed in Taiwan was the sequence where Mark learns of Ho's arrest, which was shot on Zhonghua Road in Taipei. The tunnels where Ho and Shing hide in after being ambushed are Hong Kong's anti-aircraft tunnels, which were primarily used during World War II. The prison sequence was also shot in Hong Kong, as directors like Woo were granted filming access to the local prisons and police training grounds by the government during the 1980s. Logan notes that scenes inside Kit and Jackie's apartment were filmed on a set similar to ones used on a Hong Kong television series.

Shooting was eventually completed on schedule, between a time frame of 80 to 100 days, thus wrapped in May 1986. According to the Oriental Daily News, Woo made a few cuts in post-production to reduce the film's length. This included a scene introducing Mark's wife—played by Fanny Sieh (薛芷倫)—as well as a sex scene between Kit and Jackie.

=== Music ===
Joseph Koo served as A Better Tomorrow's composer. He primarily used synthesisers for the background score, writing more dramatic music in the lead up to the action sequences. Koo also composed the film's theme song, "In the Sentimental Past", with lyrics by frequent collaborator James Wong Jim, and sung by Cheung. Written in the relative keys of E major and C minor, it is a melancholic musical piece featuring harmonica, strings, keyboard, drums, and guitar. Lyrically, "In the Sentimental Past" is about a warm reunion between individuals happy to re-express their feelings for each other. Scholar Julian Stringer described "In the Sentimental Past" as having a "lilting, haunting melody" that "denotes pain, suffering and emotional trauma". While Koo used the song as a musical motif at key emotional points throughout the movie, the full version with lyrics is played at the film's conclusion.

In addition to Koo's contributions, A Better Tomorrow also uses a few pop songs. For the sequence where Mark plants his weapons in several flowerpots, the Hokkien pop song "Don't Lose Your Will" (免失志) by Taiwanese singer Chen Hsiao-yun is used. The film also includes a version of "Tomorrow Will Be Better" sung by the Wong Tai Sin Children's Choir, and Roman Tam's "Toiling Life in the Wind and Rain", which was a cover of "Heenari" (희나리) by Koo Chang-mo. It also utilises music composed by Peter Gabriel from the 1984 film Birdy, as well as a track from Brian Eno's 1978 album Music for Films.

== Release ==
=== Context ===
Martial arts films became popular throughout Hong Kong in the 1960s and 1970s, with the kung fu film eclipsing the popularity of the wuxia film throughout the 1970s. However, by the early 1980s, local audiences began to grow tired of the traditional period pieces that were typical of the genre. Instead, comedic movies saw mainstream success throughout the decade, often ranking in the top 10 of the highest-grossing films for that year. By 1986, several popular comedy films, such as Mr. Vampire (1985) and Twinkle, Twinkle, Lucky Stars (1985) had been produced. While some movies like Yes, Madam (1985) and Royal Warriors (1986) involved police work, their focus on girls with guns meant that they did not examine brotherly relationships like A Better Tomorrow did.

Because of those audience trends, Cinema City was not expecting the movie to perform well financially. Tsui recalled that unhappy studio executives asked him to "burn the film" midway through production. As a result, A Better Tomorrow was minimally advertised in Hong Kong. The studio was also concerned with Chow's poor box office reputation: unlike the other actors, his portrait was not included in the film's publicity stills, and he received third billing in the credits behind Ti and Cheung. Despite Cinema City's misgivings however, both action movies and crime dramas had risen in popularity with local audiences. The realistically gritty Long Arm of the Law (1984) had won multiple Hong Kong Film Awards, and Cinema City's own action-oriented Aces Go Places films had performed well at the box office. In addition, the kung fu film genre had already started to modernise to cater to audience tastes. As evidenced by the success of movies like Jackie Chan's Police Story (1985), directors were transitioning to making action films set in contemporary Hong Kong, with fight scenes containing gunplay and hand-to-hand combat instead of swordfighting.

=== Box office ===
Seeing A Better Tomorrow on opening night remains one of the greatest experiences of my movie-watching life. In ninety-five minutes, I watched the audience change. Having seen hundreds, if not thousands, of kung fu films with international audiences, I had never seen a crowd react the way the normally reserved, even jaded, Hong Kong filmgoers did to this somehow familiar yet totally different experience.

— Ric Meyers, in an interview for a book about John Wick, a movie series inspired by Woo films like A Better Tomorrow

A Better Tomorrow was released in Hong Kong on 2 August 1986. First shown at a midnight sneak preview, its initial screening received an extremely positive audience reception. Woo recalled that "the people went crazy" while watching the film, and Chow noted that "there was shouting and clapping of hands, which is not something that happens in Hong Kong movies." The film went on to become the number one movie of 1986, grossing HK$34,651,324 (US$4,459,629.86) during its exhibition. While the average theatrical run in Hong Kong is normally brief, lasting one to three weeks depending on a film's popularity, A Better Tomorrow ran for a then-unheard of sixty-one days in theatres.

The film's release was rolled out across Asia over the course of the year. In Taiwan, it was released on 8 August 1986, selling 249,468 tickets across 128 screens until its last showing on 31 December of that year. It would gross NT$16,880,798 during its theatrical run, placing seventh at the Taiwanese box office of 1986. First shown in South Korea on 23 May 1987 with Mandarin dubbing, A Better Tomorrow was not initially a big success there, selling less than 100,000 tickets during its initial run. However, it grew a sizeable cult following after it began screening in smaller second-run theatres, paving the way for the sequel's mainstream success in the country. This particular run was notable, given that the popularity of Hong Kong films in Korea had diminished during the 1980s. According to electronic ticket tracking performed by the Korean Film Council beginning in 2011, additional screenings of the film have since garnered over 23,000 admissions, and earned ₩164,377,824 cumulatively. (Note: This citation links to a dynamic web page. As such, results for A Better Tomorrow will be displayed by entering its Korean title, 영웅본색, in the search bar labeled '영화명' (movie name) and clicking the '조회' (search) button.)

Despite the movie's popularity across Asia, it never received a theatrical release in mainland China. (Note: At the time of the film's release, the mainland Chinese government enforced a strict quota of non-mainland-produced films that could be shown in the country.) This did not stop Chinese audiences from watching pirated bootleg copies of the film that were smuggled into the mainland. However, on 17 November 2017, Cantonese and Mandarin dubs of the remastered version were officially released in the country, grossing over US$3 million on its opening weekend. The film went on to gross over US$4.8 million during its mainland theatrical run.

== Reception ==
=== Critical response ===
A Better Tomorrow was released in Hong Kong to general acclaim by critics. Karen Fang states that contemporary reviews praised the film for being "explosive but sentimental" and "full of masculinity", with David Bordwell remarking that most Hong Kong critics believed A Better Tomorrow to be Woo's best work. According to Jenny Lau of Cinema Journal, local reviewers liked the film not necessarily for its violence, but more for its successful adaptation of traditional wuxia tropes and action sequences. Hong Kong critic Li Cheuk-to credited A Better Tomorrow's success to its more thoroughly developed story, consistent melodramatic tone, and stylised violence. He also suggested that the heroic protagonists resonated with audiences feeling politically anxious over the upcoming handover of Hong Kong.

Over the years, English-language critics were generally positive about the film. Glenn Kenny of Entertainment Weekly said that American audiences would find A Better Tomorrow a welcome respite from most of the generic action movies made by Hollywood. A reviewer for Variety described the movie as a "fine vehicle" for Woo, calling it a significant departure from the comedies that he had previously directed. With many of the reviews being retrospectively written after the international success of Woo's later films, several critics chose to compare and contrast A Better Tomorrow with The Killer (1989) and Hard Boiled (1992). Alan Morrison of Empire said that many of Woo's stylistic hallmarks were present in the film, albeit in a rudimentary form. Both Keith Phipps of The A.V. Club and Chris Gramlich of Exclaim! preferred watching The Killer and Hard Boiled, with Gramlich explaining that he felt Woo was still trying to refine his approach with A Better Tomorrow. The Austin Chronicle's Marc Savlov said that while the movie was not as polished as The Killer, nor as complex as Bullet in the Head (1990), it was still a good representation of Woo's filmmaking style. He also believed that A Better Tomorrow was essential viewing for anyone interested in Hong Kong cinema.

Johnathan Crow of AllMovie praised Woo's "baroque" visual style. He stated that the tracking shots, fast cutting, and slow motion explosions helped deliver an emotional, melodramatic experience that elevated the film beyond traditional action cinema. A TV Guide reviewer echoed this sentiment, commenting that Woo's clear, purposeful direction made each new plot point seem like an unavoidable outcome. Both Morrison and Kenny liked the final shootout; Kenny said that it was "one of the most ridiculously exhilarating—or exhilaratingly ridiculous—sequences of its kind." Writing for the Los Angeles Times, Kevin Thomas said that he enjoyed the action and likeable characters, believing the film was a hallmark of Hong Kong cinema. Thomas also liked Koo's music, writing that the sentimental score was a great match for the film's visual energy. In contrast, Variety criticised the melodrama, finding the movie "contrived" and full of "overdone violence". Gramlich said that too much emphasis was placed on an overly-complex story containing shoddy dialogue.

Many critics praised Chow's performance as Mark. David Chute of Film Comment believed that Chow gave a "mesmerizing lead performance" that evoked Robert Mitchum, Ken Takakura and Steve McQueen. Rolling Stone's Peter Kenis commended the film for making Chow "the ultimate cool-as-fuck Asian badass". Morrison said that the actor stole the show, a sentiment also shared by Phipps. Conversely, Variety dismissed Chow and Cheung's performances as overacting. However, they praised Ti's "silent masculine presence" throughout the film, and appreciated the actor's understated vulnerability in his role as Ho. TV Guide also believed Ti expressed the internal struggle of his character convincingly, and found Waise Lee's portrayal of Shing a standout. Thomas singled out Woo's ability to get strong acting performances from his cast.

=== Accolades ===
A Better Tomorrow won two awards at the 6th Hong Kong Film Awards: Best Film and Best Actor (Chow). It also earned nine further nominations for Best Director (Woo), Best Actor (Ti), Best Supporting Actor (Lee), Best Screenplay (Woo), Best Art Direction (Bennie Lui), Best Cinematography (Wong Wing-hang), Best Film Editing (Ma Kam), Best New Performer (Lee), and Best Original Film Score (Koo).

At the 23rd Golden Horse Awards, the film won the awards for Best Director (Woo), Best Leading Actor (Ti), Best Cinematography (Wong), and Best Sound Effects. In addition to Chow also receiving a nomination for Best Leading Actor, the film was further nominated for Best Feature Film, Best Supporting Actor (Lee), Best Film Editing (Ma), and Best Original Music (Koo).

== Post-release ==
=== Home media ===
In an essay examining the development of China's independent films, director Jia Zhangke named A Better Tomorrow as one of the popular Hong Kong films that were smuggled into the mainland by video pirates. Similarly, bootleg recordings helped the film establish a cult following amongst Hong Kong cinema fans in North America. The film was first released in America on VHS in 1994. It was later packaged with its sequels in a trilogy box set and released by Tai Seng Video on 26 May 1998.

On 16 January 2001, Anchor Bay Entertainment released VHS and DVD versions of the film in North America. The VHS was in widescreen and dubbed into English, while the DVD featured both English and Cantonese audio. (Note: Attributed to multiple sources.) Anchor Bay later released A Better Tomorrow and its sequel as a box set on 2 March 2004. In the United Kingdom, a DVD titled A Better Tomorrow Collector's Edition was first released on 30 December 2002. Another Region 2 DVD release by Optimum Asia was released on 26 June 2006. The two-disc package contained a 90-minute cut of the film presented in 1.85:1 aspect ratio, with additional features like audio commentary, a trailer, and a documentary on Woo called Crossings.

Following these releases, the film was never released on Blu-ray or streaming services outside of Asia for nearly two decades due to licensing issues. However, after announcing in January 2025 that they had acquired worldwide rights from Golden Princess Film Production, Shout! Studios gave A Better Tomorrow and its sequels a digital release on 8 July of that year. Shout! also included the film as one of the titles shown on a new free ad-supported streaming television (FAST) channel of theirs called Hong Kong Fight Club. In October 2025, The Criterion Collection added A Better Tomorrow to their video on demand (VOD) streaming service, The Criterion Channel. Shout! released a seven-disc box set containing both 4K and Blu-ray versions of the entire A Better Tomorrow trilogy on 18 November 2025. Arrow Films also issued their own trilogy box set via their own distribution label, Arrow Video, on 28 September 2026.

=== Other media ===
Merchandise based on A Better Tomorrow has been released over the years. In 2016, toy manufacturer Enterbay issued a 1:6 scale action figure of Mark Lee. The figure came with multiple accessories, such as a pair of pistols, cigarettes, and bundles of money. Beginning in 2018, an officially-licensed comic book adaptation by Wong Shui-pan (黃水斌) was released over the span of three issues.

In September 2019, it was announced that musical director Wang Yong-beom would be adapting the film and its sequel into a South Korean stage musical. With music composed by Lee Seong-jun (이성준), the musical would use A Better Tomorrow as the basis for its first act, with its second act utilising scenes from A Better Tomorrow II and multiple flashback sequences to tell Kit's perspective. Featuring an ensemble cast of actors (Note: The three leads were cast as follows: Yoo Jun-sang, Im Tae-kyung and Min Woo-hyuk as Ho (name localised as Song Ja-ho, or 송자호); Lee Jang-woo, Han Ji-sang, and Park Yeong-su as Kit (localised as Song Ja-geol, or 송자걸); Choi Dae-chul and Park Min-seong (박민성) as Mark; The musical also featured: Kim Dae-jong and Park In-bae as Shing (localised as Ah-Seong, or 아성); J-Min, Song Ju-hui, and Jeong Yu-ji as Peggy, a minor character in A Better Tomorrow II.) and songs from both the first two films and Leslie Cheung's discography, it premiered at the KEPCO Art Centre in Seoul on 17 December 2019. Receiving generally positive reviews for its special effects and performances, (Note: Attributed to multiple sources.) the musical was scheduled to run until 22 March 2020, in January 2020, additional showings were added at the Keimyung Art Centre in Daegu from 10–12 April. However, on 10 February 2020, the production company suspended all future performances of the musical, citing the COVID-19 pandemic and offering refunds to ticket holders. Shortly after, multiple reports surfaced alleging that the production company failed to pay some of the actors and crew for their work on the project. A Newsis article stated that despite the musical attracting middle-aged audiences, it was not very popular amongst the target demographic of people in their 20s and 30s.

In March 2024, it was announced in Japan that another stage musical based on the film would begin showing in the country that year. This version was written and directed by playwright Chong Wishing, who made major changes to the story. In his adaptation, Ho is an injured participant of the 1989 Tiananmen Square protests who accepts Mark's suggestion to move to Hong Kong. After seven years pass, the pair join the triad, starting their counterfeiting operation one year before the handover of the territory. Two members of Travis Japan, Kaito Matsukura and Noel Kawashima, were cast as Kit and Mark respectively, with Sho Aoyagi playing Ho. The musical was performed from 24 June to 8 July 2024 at the Nippon Seinenkan in Shinjuku, and then from 12–16 July at the Orix Theatre in Osaka.

=== Re-releases ===
A Better Tomorrow has been re-released several times, such as in 2011 for the film's 25th anniversary of its Japanese release, and in 2016 for its 30th anniversary in Korea. In 2014, it was announced that the Shanghai International Film Festival, in collaboration with sponsor Jaeger-LeCoultre and film preservation laboratory L'Immagine Ritrovata, would begin restoring A Better Tomorrow the following year. This project was started in January 2015 and completed in May; the restored film would be screened at the 2015 Shanghai International Film Festival, as well as the Hong Kong International Film Festival in 2016. A 4K remastered version was released theatrically in Japan on 22 April 2022 to celebrate the 35th anniversary of the film's Japanese release date.

In North America, a remastered version was screened as part of the Hong Kong Cinema Classics retrospective presented by Shout! Studios and GKIDS. First shown at the American Cinematheque and the IFC Center in August 2025, the programme continued throughout 2026 in multiple cities across the United States and Canada. Shout! further announced in December 2025 that A Better Tomorrow would be given a wider American theatrical re-release. The film was shown on about 800 screens across three dates in March 2026, with a new pre-recorded interview with Woo following its presentation. This theatrical re-release grossed US$240,938. It was also screened in the United Kingdom starting 26 June 2026.

== Thematic analysis ==
=== Chivalry, loyalty and male bonding ===
In ancient China, the people are a lot more spiritual and they have a code about honour, loyalty, and chivalry. Something about chivalry, if you got help from the others, you got to pay back double to the others and help out, and always [be] grateful and appreciate what you've got. And people like helping each other, that's our spirit. People can sacrifice themselves for the others.

— John Woo, in a 1997 interview with Michael Singer

A Better Tomorrow is a modern adaptation of wuxia films, combining chivalric Chinese traditions with contemporary gunplay. Woo takes inspiration from the partially Confucian moral codes of wuxia's swordsmen characters (youxia), and the long-standing rituals of the triads, which are rooted in Taoism. Ho and Mark are portrayed as heroic outlaws who operate outside of the boundaries of mainstream society, like their wuxia counterparts living in the jianghu. They adhere to a conceptual "system of brotherhood, honour and justice" called yi (義; ji6; 'righteousness'), and swear by a personal code of loyalty called yi qi (義氣; ji6 hei3; 'breath of yi'). Conversely, Shing follows what Lisa Odham Stokes and Michael Hoover define as choosing jing (精; zing1; 'essence') over qing (情; cing4; 'feeling'). Unlike Ho and Mark, who possess the chivalrous trait of having empathy for others (qing), Shing is willing to betray his brotherhood because he values caring for his physical being (jing) first.

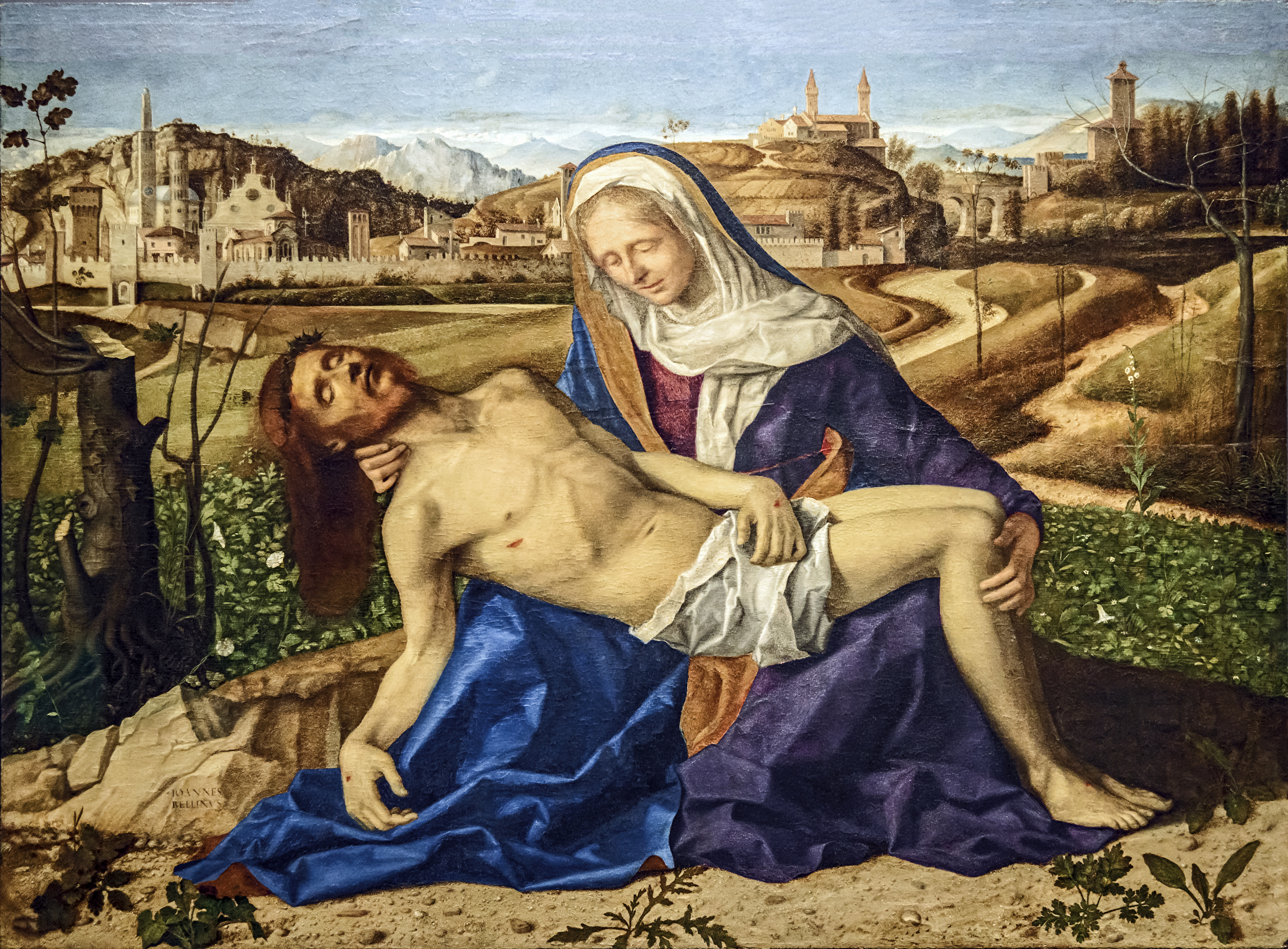
The Martinengo Pietà (c. 1505) by Giovanni Bellini. Mark's death evokes this and other versions of the Pietà, an artistic representation of the Lamentation of Christ featuring the Virgin Mary.

To show the similarities between biological and triad brotherhood, Woo introduces mirrored relationships between the characters. Ho is the mature older brother of Kit, a blood brother to Mark, and a trusted mentor to Shing. These parallels in kinship are reinforced through language: Mark is deferentially addressed with the honorific gor (哥; 'older brother'), and characters use the phrase dai lo (大佬; 'big brother') to refer to their triad superiors. Kenneth E. Hall said that the film's primary conflicts revolve around filial piety. Ho's elder brother status implies that he is not just required to respect his father, but also assume the position as the patriarch (家長; gaa1 zoeng2; 'head of the household') if his father dies. However, both Kit and Shing reject their own duty of filial piety towards their respective elder brothers. Kit's hostility stems from both personal resentment over Ho's presumed involvement in their father's death, as well as occupational frustration over being blocked from promotion. Shing meanwhile, double-crosses Ho for his own gain. These parallel violations of yi qi are presented through repeated scenes and symmetrical shot compositions, with Mark commonly used as the axis for cuts to highlight his importance as the film's emotional centre. Stephen Teo wrote that Mark "represents an aestheticised model of the wuxia hero-cum-contemporary killer." Despite becoming crippled, he draws upon the strength of his brotherly friendship with Ho to overcome his disability and transform into a heroic figure. Mark's devotion to the triad code compels him to return and help Ho in the final firefight, and he displays his heroism in his plea to Kit to remember his fraternal loyalty, pushing Kit out of the way of Shing's gunfire. When Mark dies, Woo employs the Christian imagery of a pietà to associate his death with Jesus. This religious reference highlights Mark as both a victim and hero who sacrifices themselves to rekindle Ho and Kit's relationship, and thus restore a world of traditional values and homosociality. Likewise, Ho gives up his freedom by pressuring Kit to arrest him, knowing that his brother's career will be salvaged by bringing him to justice.

Some authors have discussed the film's usage of melodrama, and how its portrayal of brotherhood has been interpreted by some Western audiences as homoerotic. According to Julian Stringer, Woo's combination of action and melodrama produces a depiction of masculinity distinct from American films. (Note: Stringer uses academic Geoffrey Nowell-Smith's suggestion that Hollywood segregated its movie releases into two specific types. The masculine "doing" genres would encompass men taking action, such as the Western film and the war film. Conversely, the feminine "suffering" genres, such as the woman's film and the melodrama, would depict female agency being impaired.) In Woo's "male melodramas", men participate in both violence and heroism, while also experiencing intense sadness and loss. Ho's agency in A Better Tomorrow is impacted by familial duties; he is reluctant to seek revenge on Shing because he wants to regain Kit's trust, as well as to honour his promise to his father of leaving the triads. Woo also differs from American action films in that he avoids showing physically sculpted bodies. Instead, he prefers to showcase both "stylish clothes and accessories" as well as male emotional vulnerability, presented as intimate gazes between men. Fang stated that this level of closeness, shown in Ho's post-prison reunion with Mark, is usually only reserved in Hollywood action films for impending character deaths. Jillian Sandell wrote that these moments underscore the importance of male bonding within the triad code of honour, allowing Ho and Mark to foster a connection that is both "emotionally and materially fulfilling" despite their bleak circumstances. Stringer argued that this depiction is not inherently homosexual, since it represses sexuality instead of foregrounding it. Mikel Koven believed that interpreting Woo's gangster films as homoerotic misreads how the Hong Kong audience sees the male relationships. Woo has echoed this sentiment, stating, "In my culture there is no hiding. If we need to cry, we cry. If you need to hug someone you do it whether they are your lover or your friend."

=== Societal change ===
A Better Tomorrow has been interpreted as commentary on the disappearance of tradition with societal change. Woo was spurred to direct the film out of concern that traditional values in Hong Kong were being eroded by modernisation. Caleb Kelso-March commented that the film portrays "conditions of capitalist modernity" found in Hong Kong at the time, such as the spread of organised crime and financial uncertainty. Mark and Ho are depicted as men of humble beginnings who have risen the ranks of a capitalist society by becoming successful counterfeiters of American currency. Sam Ho remarked that the code of brotherhood that Mark and Ho observe allows for illegal activities like counterfeiting, since mainstream Hong Kong society is not directly impacted by the forging of foreign currency. Shing's rise to power, however, hurts on multiple fronts: his betrayal erodes the traditional values of the criminal underworld, and his move into drug trafficking directly harms Hong Kong civilians. According to Karen Fang, Shing's ability to use money and power to escape consequence highlights the "degradation of justice in modern society."

Jillian Sandell described the three protagonists as "loner heroes" who become marginalised from their respective organisations. Kit's policeman career is stalled by his brother's criminal affiliations, and Ho and Mark's position in the triad is upended when Shing usurps their power and status. Ho tries to legitimise himself by joining a taxi company run by ex-convicts, but he ultimately fails to "live outside the institutions available within Hong Kong capitalism" once Shing's subordinates ransack the company. Sandell said that Mark represents the "supreme loner" whose code of honour causes him to reject any organisation; this lack of affiliation spells his inevitable death. According to her, Mark symbolically dies from fatigue instead of literal injury, since his kind of heroism is a "throwback to China's past with no place in contemporary Hong Kong".

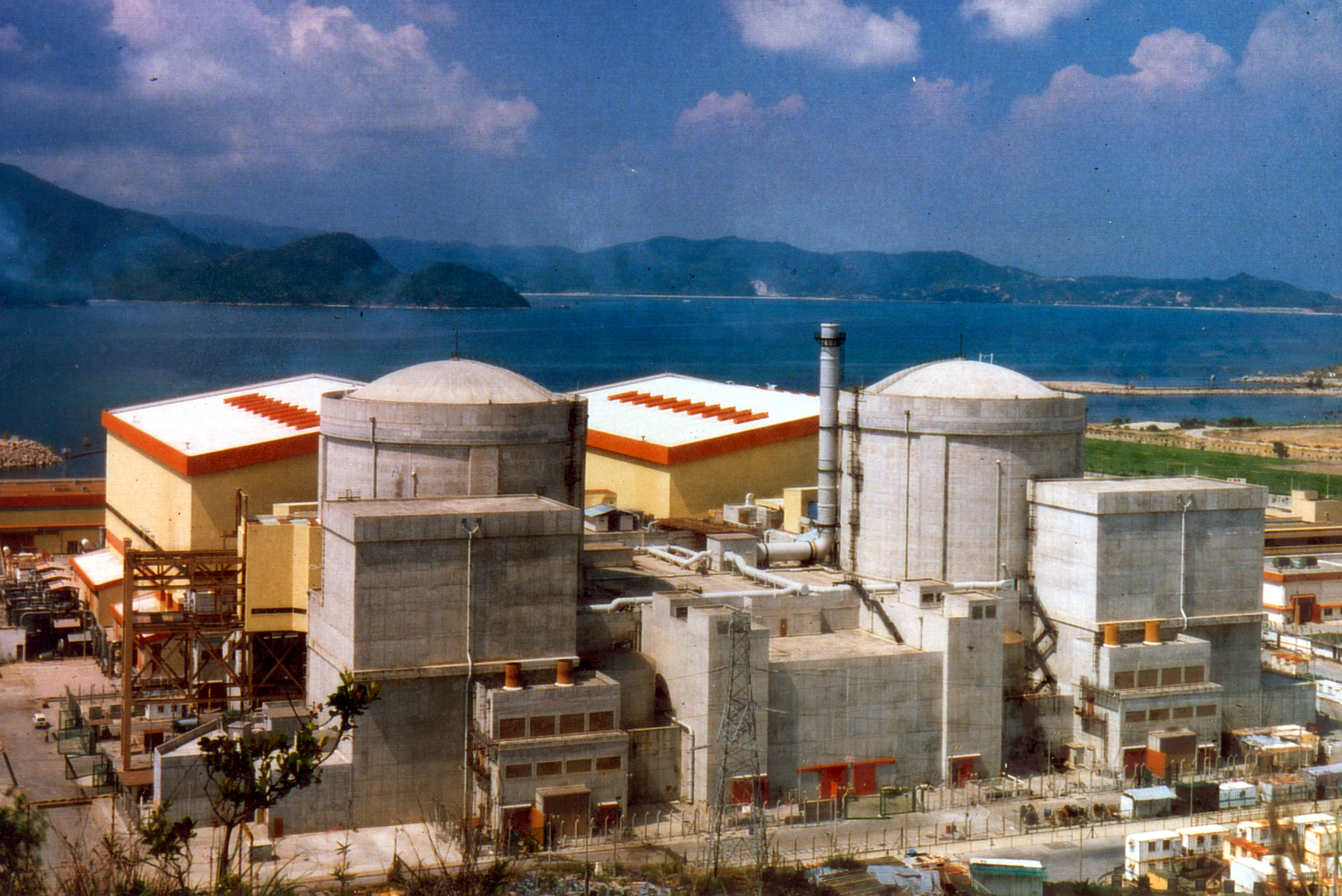
The Daya Bay Nuclear Power Plant in 2007

While Woo has maintained that A Better Tomorrow was not intended as political commentary, various scholars have viewed the film as a meditation on the anxieties surrounding the impending 1997 handover of Hong Kong. According to Tony Williams, Mark's dialogue about Hong Kong is an example of this uneasiness: after reflecting on the region's nighttime beauty with Ho, Mark grimly states, "Like most things, it won't last. That's for sure." Kin-yan Szeto said that the marginalised characters form bonds over this uncertainty, equating Ho's struggle between loyalty and the law with Hong Kong's sense of identity between the United Kingdom and China. Film critic Li Cheuk-to suggested that the film's popularity in Hong Kong might have stemmed from its role as an outlet for frustration over the August 1986 construction of the nearby Daya Bay Nuclear Power Plant in Guangdong. Li said that local audiences, concerned over the environmental impacts of nuclear power as well as Hong Kong's lack of autonomy over the plant's construction, empathised with Mark's feelings on personally fighting to "regain what we have lost".

=== Cinematic homage and meta-reference ===
According to Woo, the world in A Better Tomorrow is an amalgamation of both his personal memories and his love of cinema. Film historian Po Fung said that the film's narrative structure contains similarities to Chang Cheh's The Duel (1971), with Magnan-Park observing that Mark's self-sacrifice mirrors the martyrdom endings in Chang's films. Kenneth E. Hall also likened the movie to Chang's One Armed Swordsman series due to their shared focus on familial relations. Within the Shaw Brothers catalogue, A Better Tomorrow bears some resemblance to The Brothers (1979) directed by Hua Shan (華山). Li Cheuk-to further identified wuxia films directed by Chor Yuen and written by Gu Long as additional possible references. Anne T. Ciecko said that the film shares a relationship with Japanese chambara films, and Tony Williams highlighted the influence of yakuza films on Woo's work, as they both involve "similar conflicts involving ancient loyalty and modern values". Both Kristof Van den Troost and Karen Fang note that the film's iconic shot of Mark lighting a cigarette with a flaming bank note is similar to a sequence in Ng See-yuen's Anti-Corruption (1975).

[Arthur Penn] used strong film language [in Bonnie and Clyde] to explore the stunning romanticism and beauty of life and death. [...] Warren [Beatty] and Faye [Dunaway] look at each other with that knowing smile. They feel the end but they also feel eternity. The duality of knowing they are going to die but also knowing that their love will live on afterward. That is the romance that makes me hold my breath.

— John Woo, 2002 interview with Karen Fang

Woo also borrows liberally from non-Asian cinema. From French New Wave films, he adopted the costuming of Alain Delon in Jean-Pierre Melville's Le Samouraï. Fang said that these cinematic inclusions "foreground the film's stylisation and demonstrate how [Woo's] own film self-consciously pursues the 'coolness' that Woo constantly praises." Woo also looked at American cinema for inspiration: Mark's slow-motion restaurant entrance was a nod to Martin Scorsese's Mean Streets (1973). He was also heavily influenced by Arthur Penn's romanticised depiction of the deaths of the titular characters in Bonnie and Clyde (1967), and sought to recreate that feeling for Mark's death. Fang believed that the film superficially shares some of the aesthetics of film noir, such as its low-key lighting and pessimistic outlook, but differs in its hopeful, redemptive ending where Ho handcuffs himself to Kit.

Hall said that A Better Tomorrow can be interpreted as an allegorical, semi-autobiographical work referencing Woo's own feelings and experiences. Like Ho and Mark, whose good fortunes run out after travelling to Taiwan, Woo experienced major dissatisfaction over being sent there by Cinema City to oversee its regional office. He also stayed in Taiwan for roughly the same amount of time as Ho's three-year prison sentence. Ho and Mark's friendship can thus be read as an allegory for Tsui Hark's support of Woo. The inclusion of Ken, who helps Ho reintegrate into society by giving him work, parallels Tsui rescuing Woo's career by letting him return to Hong Kong to direct A Better Tomorrow.

In an idea mirroring Patrick Lung's own acting role in The Story of a Discharged Prisoner, Woo casts himself as a police inspector. This cameo can also be viewed as self-reflexive, in that Woo's character is shown gradually understanding—and even admiring—the gangsters over time. In an interview, Woo stated, "I always believe that if you want to catch a thief you have to think like him and act like him, first. Then you can make your judgement." Fang drew similarities between the cameo appearances of Woo, Woody Allen, and Alfred Hitchcock in their respective films; these acting roles indicate authorial control of their work. This self-referential understanding is further deepened by Woo's decision to let the cast direct his acting; such a collaborative role reversal reinforces the film's themes of brotherhood and having empathy for others.

== Legacy ==
The film's box office success positively impacted the careers of many of its participants. It turned both Woo and Chow into superstars in Asia, and helped forge a partnership in which Chow would star in many of the director's following films. Woo was granted more creative freedom for his projects, and some of his shelved films, like Heroes Shed No Tears (1986), were released to capitalise on his newfound popularity. It would also lead to a decades-long work relationship between Woo and Terence Chang, who would produce several of Woo's films in the future.

Chow's performance in the film turned him into a local icon, with him becoming known as "Brother Mark" in Hong Kong for years. As a result of the movie's success, Chow began to receive a barrage of acting opportunities, enabling him to be cast in almost three dozen films from 1986 to 1989. Many of these movies became Hong Kong box-office successes, such as Prison on Fire, Tragic Hero, and An Autumn's Tale (all 1987 and the third, fourth, and fifth highest-grossing films that year respectively), The Eighth Happiness (highest-grossing film of 1988), and God of Gamblers (highest-grossing movie of 1989).

Ti and Cheung also benefited from the film's success. His career rejuvenated, Ti would star alongside Chow in other Cinema City films throughout the late 1980s, such as Tiger on the Beat and City War (both 1988). Cheung's performance as Kit, meanwhile, was considered to be a breakthrough acting role, strengthening his reputation as a multi-talented entertainer. The theme song that he sang, "In the Sentimental Past", won three awards at the 1986 Jade Solid Gold Best Ten Music Awards Presentation: a Gold Song award for being in the top ten best songs, and two additional awards for Best Composition and Best Music Arrangement. The song also won an award at the 1986 RTHK Top 10 Gold Songs Awards. In 1987, Cheung would sign with Cinema City and its record label subsidiary, Cinepoly Records. At Cinepoly, he would release the best-selling album of 1987, Summer Romance, which would sell over 350,000 copies and be certified seven times platinum.

=== Cultural influence ===
Upon its release, the film sparked avid enthusiasm amongst Hong Kong audiences. Influenced by the movie's preoccupation with honour and loyalty, they began using the honorific "gor" (哥) in casual slang to address each other. Young men in Hong Kong began trying to emulate Mark by wearing long coats and sunglasses, despite the local humidity. This fashion trend caused Alain Delon's branded sunglasses to sell out in Asia, spurring the actor to write a thank-you letter to Woo. The long coat also subsequently began to be colloquially known as a "Mark coat" (Chinese: Mark哥褸; Jyutping: Mark go1 lau5) in reference to the character.

A Better Tomorrow shaped the immediate production trends of Hong Kong cinema; Sek Kei wrote that after just a month in theatres, the movie had "effectively modernized the male role in martial arts action films in the past." Kristof Van den Troost said that as a result of the movie's popularity, future Hong Kong crime films would shift away from gritty realism and adopt a more melodramatic tone. Generally credited as the genesis of "gun fu", A Better Tomorrow marked the starting point for the heroic bloodshed genre. (Note: Heroic bloodshed is what English-language writers use to describe the yingxiongpian (英雄片; jing1 hung4 pin3; 'hero movie'), an existing Chinese-language term for the genre of movies inspired by A Better Tomorrow. This term is derived from the original film's Chinese title.) For a few years, a wave of gangster films were released in Hong Kong that imitated the tone, characters and themes found in Woo's work. This partially contributed to the rapid growth of the Hong Kong film industry throughout the 1980s, with gangster movies representing 40% of the films produced in 1989. Some heroic bloodshed films, like Ringo Lam's City on Fire (1987) and Full Contact (1992)—both of which star Chow Yun-fat—became successful in their own right. City on Fire earned both Chow and Lam a Hong Kong Film Award for Best Actor and Best Director, respectively.

Similar to its reception in Hong Kong, the film grew a devoted fan base in South Korea through its distribution in second-run theatres. Enamoured by Chow's character, South Korean men also began styling themselves after him; according to Kim Seung-goo, they would retroactively self-identify as "the generation of hero Chow". The popularity of A Better Tomorrow helped drive demand for more Hong Kong cinema releases in the country, including more heroic bloodshed films. Jinsoo An commented that Korean journalists, recognising the relative novelty of ideas expressed in heroic bloodshed, conceived the term "Hong Kong noir" to describe the overarching "pessimistic energy and allegorical implications" found in the genre. The success of A Better Tomorrow helped its sequel achieve mainstream popularity in South Korea upon its release in 1988, with A Better Tomorrow II becoming the ninth highest-grossing film that year. While A Better Tomorrow was resigned to fringe appearances in Western markets due to a lack of prior mainstream interest in Hong Kong cinema, Karen Fang stated that the film helped the development of international film markets for Hong Kong.

A Better Tomorrow has been referenced numerous times across film and television. (Note: References to A Better Tomorrow in Chinese-language film and television are attributed to these particular sources. References to the film in South Korean film and television are attributed to the following sources.) In Japan, Chow's appearance as Mark inspired the designs and characterisations of similar characters in the anime television series Mobile Fighter G Gundam, as well as the manga series Black Lagoon. Woo himself alluded to the film in a future directorial work, Just Heroes (1989), where a character would plant firearms in potted plants like Mark. Many directors like Quentin Tarantino, Robert Rodriguez, and the Wachowskis acknowledge its influence on their work, with Tarantino recalling that he also tried to dress like Chow for weeks after watching the film. Filmmaker Benny Chan stated that he repeatedly watched A Better Tomorrow for inspiration while directing The White Storm (2013). In 2023, a video clip of an animated beaver passionately lip-syncing a monologue delivered by Chow in the film became an Internet meme. Originally posted by a Chinese animator on Bilibili the previous year, the video gained significant traction after being reposted on TikTok.

=== Critical reassessment ===
After consulting a panel of industry filmmakers and critics, the Hong Kong Film Awards ranked A Better Tomorrow second in its 2005 list of the Best 100 Chinese Motion Pictures. In 2010, members of the Hong Kong Film Critics Society voted the film as one of the Top 10 Hong Kong Films. The film was listed at number 17 on the Taipei Golden Horse Film Festival's list of the 100 Greatest Chinese-Language Films in 2011. That same year, the Hong Kong Film Archive included A Better Tomorrow in its 100 Must-See Hong Kong Movies exhibition. According to the curators, this programme featured a collection of films best representative of the region's "rich cinematic heritage". The 6th Jackie Chan Action Movie Awards in 2021 also listed the film as one of the top 10 best Chinese action films.

On the review aggregator website Rotten Tomatoes, 95% of 22 critics' reviews are positive. Metacritic, which uses a weighted average, assigned the film a score of 78 out of 100, based on 7 critics, indicating "generally favorable" reviews. Rotten Tomatoes placed the film on its list of 140 essential action movies. Time Out listed the film first in its ranking of the 100 best Hong Kong films. The magazine also placed it number 40 in its list of the 101 best action films ever made. In 2021, The Guardian listed it number 18 on its list of the 30 best mobster movies, and Total Film ranked it number 9 in its 2025 list of the 32 greatest action films of the 1980s. In a retrospective review, Peter Bradshaw said, "There is nothing subtle about A Better Tomorrow, yet it is fierce, vehement and runs on rails."

== Sequels, prequel and spin-offs ==
The success of A Better Tomorrow spawned two more movies. A Better Tomorrow II (1987) was a narrative sequel that followed Ho and Kit as they investigate Ho's former boss, Lung. To take advantage of Chow's newfound superstardom—despite his character's death in the first film—the actor was recast as Mark's twin brother, Ken. Woo and Tsui's creative disagreements throughout its production badly strained their friendship. A Better Tomorrow II performed well at the box office, earning HK$23 million and becoming the sixth highest-grossing film that year.

The fractured partnership between Woo and Tsui led to Woo not returning as director for the next film in the series. After collaborating on The Killer, Woo directed Bullet in the Head without Tsui's involvement, basing his movie off of a script he had intended as a prequel to A Better Tomorrow. Tsui would instead direct his own prequel film, A Better Tomorrow III: Love & Death in Saigon (1989). This depicted Mark's trip to Saigon during the Vietnam War to bring his cousin and uncle back to Hong Kong. For this movie, Tsui explored Mark's origin story, giving him a female mentor and love interest portrayed by Anita Mui. A Better Tomorrow III made HK$18 million, reaching eighth place at the box office and earning two nominations at the 9th Hong Kong Film Awards.

The plot of A Better Tomorrow has been reused multiple times by other films. Sanjay Gupta unofficially reworked several elements into his 1994 Hindi movie, Aatish: Feel the Fire. Officially, it has also been remade twice. After Korean production company Fingerprint Pictures acquired the rights to remake the film in 2006, they produced A Better Tomorrow (2010) directed by Song Hae-sung, with Woo acting as executive producer. Starring Joo Jin-mo, Song Seung-heon, and Kim Kang-woo as the three protagonists, it earned US$10.2 million at the box office. A mainland Chinese version, A Better Tomorrow 2018, was directed by Ding Sheng and featured Wang Kai, Ma Tianyu, and Darren Wang. This film was a box-office bomb, earning only CN¥ 63 million despite a production budget of CN¥ 100 million.

At the 27th Shanghai International Film Festival in June 2025, the China Film Foundation premiered a film that used generative AI to reimagine A Better Tomorrow in a futuristic setting. This movie, A Better Tomorrow: Cyber Border (英雄本色之賽博邊緣), was reported as the first animated feature film to be fully produced using artificial intelligence (AI). It was meant as part of a larger initiative by the China Film Foundation and its partners to embrace the use of AI in film production and restoration. Woo said in a written statement that he was uninvolved with its production—having relinquished the rights for A Better Tomorrow—but was "curious about the outcome and the effect it might have on [his] original film."
