= Cecilia Wong (critic) =

Hong Kong film critic (born 1974/1975)

- 王麗明
- Born: Wong Lai-ming; 1974 or 1975 (age 51–52); Hong Kong
- Education: Hong Kong Baptist University (BA)
- Occupation: Film critic
- Spouse: Danny Tang (m. 2014)
- Children: 1

Cecilia Wong Lai-ming (Chinese: 王麗明; born 1974/1975), also known by her pen name Cheuknaam (卓男), is a Hong Kong film critic. She served as an editor for City Entertainment Magazine and was the chairperson of the Hong Kong Film Critics Society. In 2021, she moved to Taiwan and became a freelance writer on Hong Kong cinema.

== Early life and education ==
Wong was born in 1974 or 1975 with an older twin sister and resided in Sheung Shui. She has a birthmark around her left eye, which led to her being bullied by peers since primary school. In the 1980s, some of her relatives migrated to Taiwan, and she often visits them there. She was recommended by a Taiwanese doctor to perform plastic surgery to remove her birthmark, and starting at age 12, she underwent over ten surgeries of various scales in Taiwan. She has stated that the bullying she endured sparked her interest in films, which she viewed as an "escape from reality". She was also interested in watching films at cinemas in Taiwan, as she found the experience very different from that in Hong Kong. In the 1990s, she began writing film reviews for magazines. She initially studied physics for a year at the Hong Kong University of Science and Technology but found it unsuitable and considered to study film instead. Her twin sister, who was studying film at a Taiwanese university, advised her to pursue languages for a wider career path. She then transferred to the Department of English Language and Literature at Hong Kong Baptist University, majoring in comparative literature.

== Career ==
After graduating from university, Wong briefly worked as a subtitle editor for a film company before becoming an editor for City Entertainment Magazine. She worked there for two to three years, which she described that period as a low point for Hong Kong cinema. She then served as an editor and executive manager for the Hong Kong Film Critics Society and as a researcher for RTHK, before becoming a programmer at the Hong Kong Film Archive before April 2013. She also worked as the editor of special issues for the Hong Kong Film Awards for around 20 years. In 2017, Wong and film historian Po Fung co-edited Qun Fang Pu: Contemporary Hong Kong Film Actresses, a biography of popular Hong Kong and Taiwanese actresses who debuted in Hong Kong cinema in the 1970s. Kwong Hiu-yan of HK01 praised Wong's use of her experience at the Hong Kong Film Archive to document and archive the actresses from multiple perspectives; while Trista Luo of Orange News described the book as "painting a personal portrait of Hong Kong actresses and showcasing a vibrant collective cinema scene". Wong became the chairperson of the Hong Kong Film Critics Society in 2018. That same year, she and film scholar Stephanie Ng co-edited Ann Hui: Forty, a biography of director Ann Hui. After migrating to Taiwan in 2021, Wong became a freelance writer but continued to focus on Hong Kong cinema. In 2021, she also served as a jury member for the 58th Golden Horse Awards.

== Personal life ==
Wong married Danny Tang Chi-chung, an IT engineer, in 2014. They met while working together at the Hong Kong Film Archive. They gave birth to a son in 2015. Tang later switched careers to become a feng shui consultant to better balance his time for family. The family migrated to Taiwan and settled in Beitou District, Taipei, in 2021 when their son was five, citing concerns that Hong Kong was "unsuitable for children to study". Wong acquired Taiwanese citizenship as of November 2024.

== Bibliography ==
Year	Title	Original title	Publisher	Ref.
2017	Qun Fang Pu: Contemporary Hong Kong Film Actresses	群芳譜：當代香港電影女星	Hong Kong Film Critics Society	
2018	Ann Hui: Forty	許鞍華．電影四十	Hong Kong Film Critics Society	
