= Po Fung =

Hong Kong film historian and critic

- 蒲鋒
- Born: Po Fung; Hong Kong
- Occupations: Film historian; Film critic
- Years active: 1993–present

Po Fung (Chinese: 蒲鋒) is a Hong Kong film historian and critic. He began his career as a film critic in 1993 writing for Sing Tao Wan Po, and became a co-founder and chairperson of the Hong Kong Film Critics Society. He also served as a research officer at the Hong Kong Film Archive and currently works as an independent researcher in Taiwan.

== Early life and education ==
Po was born in the 1960s. (Note: In a September 2019 article by Liberty Times, it was reported that Po Fung was in his fifties.) He developed an interest in literature and history from a young age, especially in reading and watching wuxia novels and films. He studied history at university and remained passionate about reading, citing Frederick Forsyth's books as the spark that ignited his love for literature. He befriended film critic and media executive Lam Chiu-wing, whose influence sparked his interest in cinema. After graduating, he began writing his own film reviews in the 1990s.

== Career ==
=== Early ventures in Hong Kong (1993–2018) ===
After Dora Liu, deputy editor of Sing Tao Wan Po, resigned, Lam Chiu-wing was appointed to substitute her, and he invited Po to contribute film reviews. Po became a full-time film critic from 1993 to 1994 but struggled to make a living. Initially aiming to become a screenwriter, he was referred by Lam to work as a researcher for TVB, where he mainly conducted field research or examined historical and literary materials to assist screenwriters in creating television dramas. While working as a researcher, Po continued writing film reviews part-time until 2010, contributing to tabloids such as Express News and Hong Kong Today. Po explained that when writing for Express News, he primarily covered mainstream films at first, later expanding to include classic Western films. But unlike many critics who were reluctant to review less well-known films, Po was willing to write about them, therefore the chief editors assigned him to focus on niche films, making him one of only two critics with dedicated film review columns alongside Sek Kei.

In 1995, he co-founded the Hong Kong Film Critics Society. In 1997, he co-founded POV Bookstore, a film bookstore with branches in Yau Ma Tei and Wan Chai, with Lam and fellow critic Shu Kei, but the bookstore closed in 1999. He served as chairperson of the Society from 2001 to 2002, and participated in research on Sinophone cinema at the Hong Kong Film Archive, initially working under research officer Wong Ai-ling, including editing Classic 200: The Best 200 Chinese-Language Films in 2005. After Wong left the Archive in 2010, Po took over as the research officer in August of that year. He published The Sword of Light and Shadows: Analyzing the Texture and Context of Wuxia Films in the same year. He spent 15 months on research and the book traced the entire history of wuxia cinema in the 20th century. Matthew Cheng of Wen Wei Po commended it as "the best Hong Kong film review book" and that "no one understands wuxia films better than Po Fung"; while Night Fung of Hong Kong Daily News praised the book for "showing lesser-known breakthroughs by Bruce Lee" and "deepening readers' appreciation of his contributions and significance". In 2012, Po published Mastering Virtue: The Cinematic Legend of a Martial Artist, an essay collection based on 20 years of research into Wong Fei-hung films.

Po left the Hong Kong Film Archive in 2014 to focus on writing Hong Kong film history. That year, he edited Always in the Dark: A Study of Hong Kong Gangster Films, a collection of reviews on Hong Kong triad films. In 2017, he co-edited Qun Fang Pu: Contemporary Hong Kong Film Actresses, a biography of popular Hong Kong and Taiwanese actresses who debuted in Hong Kong cinema in the 1970s, with film critic Cecilia Wong. Kwong Hiu-yan of HK01 praised Po's use of her experience at the Hong Kong Film Archive to document and archive the actresses from multiple perspectives; while Trista Luo of Orange News described the book as "painting a personal portrait of Hong Kong actresses and showcasing a vibrant collective cinema scene".

=== Research in Taiwan (2018–present) ===
In June 2018, Po migrated to Taiwan through the immigrant investor program. He and his wife had considered emigrating after the Umbrella Movement in 2014, citing loss of confidence in Hong Kong's future and political divide of the city as the reasons. In November, he opened Sword of Light and Shadows Bookstore (電光影裡書店) in Ximending, Taipei, named after his book The Sword of Light and Shadows, which he described as the only bookstore in Taiwan dedicated to film books. The store sold videodiscs from the Taiwan Film and Audiovisual Institute and Hong Kong film publications that were rare in Taiwan. The bookstore closed in 2020 due to the COVID-19 pandemic. Po continued to write reviews for Hong Kong media after migrating to Taiwan, and he has focused on research and writing since the bookstore's closure. He also served as a jury member for the 57th Golden Horse Awards in 2020.

In March 2022, Po published Searching for Old Traces: A Genealogy of Chinese Melodramatic Films, a film history book on Sinophone melodramas. Building on his research from the Hong Kong Film Archive, he expanded the scope to include Shanghainese and Taiwanese films he studied while in Taiwan. Film critic Joyce Yang praised the book as "rigorous, substantial, and the research always carries weight" and noted that it "offered important insights into the elements of this genre". That year, he also published No Evil Goes Unpunished: The Texture and Context of Hong Kong Gangster Films, another book on Hong Kong triad films expanding his research from Always in the Dark. In 2023, he released Irresistible Hong Kong Cinema 2021, a journal that served as an add-on to Hong Kong Cinema 2021: Is the World Yours or Ours?, an essay collection by the Hong Kong Film Critics Society, featuring films that were censored or not released in Hong Kong.

== Personal life ==
Po is married and the couple resides in Taipei, Taiwan. He obtained Taiwanese citizenship around September 2019.

== Bibliography ==
Year	Title	Original title	Publisher	Ref.
2010	The Sword of Light and Shadows: Analyzing the Texture and Context of Wuxia Films	電光影裏斬春風—剖析武俠片的肌理脈絡	Hong Kong Film Critics Society	
2012	Mastering Virtue: The Cinematic Legend of a Martial Artist	主善為師—黃飛鴻電影研究	Hong Kong Film Archive	
2013	Golden Harvest: Leading Change in Changing Times	乘風變化—嘉禾電影研究	Hong Kong Film Archive	
2014	Always in the Dark: A Study of Hong Kong Gangster Films	江湖路冷—香港黑幫電影研究	Hong Kong Film Archive	
2017	Qun Fang Pu: Contemporary Hong Kong Film Actresses	群芳譜：當代香港電影女星	Hong Kong Film Critics Society	
2022	Searching for Old Traces: A Genealogy of Chinese Melodramatic Films	閒尋舊蹤跡—華語文藝電影源流考	Bookman Bookstore	
2022	No Evil Goes Unpunished: The Texture and Context of Hong Kong Gangster Films	無惡不作—香港黑幫電影的肌理脈絡	Hong Kong Film Critics Society	
2023	Irresistible Hong Kong Cinema 2021	禁不了的香港電影2021	Sword of Light and Shadows Bookstore	
