= Aatish: Feel the Fire =

- Promotional Poster
- Directed by: Sanjay Gupta
- Written by: Kamlesh Pandey (dialogue)
- Story by: Robin Bhatt; Sujit Sen
- Based on: Deewaar (1975) by Yash Chopra; A Better Tomorrow (1986) by John Woo; State of Grace (1990) by Phil Joanou
- Produced by: G. P. Sippy; Vijay Sippy
- Starring: Sanjay Dutt; Aditya Pancholi; Raveena Tandon; Karishma Kapoor; Atul Agnihotri
- Cinematography: Najeeb Khan
- Edited by: Afaq Hussain
- Music by: Nadeem-Shravan
- Distributed by: Sippy Films
- Release date: 17 June 1994
- Running time: 160 minutes
- Country: India
- Language: Hindi
- Budget: ₹5 crore
- Box office: ₹14 crore

Aatish: Feel the Fire, shortly called Aatish, is a 1994 Indian Hindi-language action crime film directed by Sanjay Gupta in his directorial debut, with an ensemble starcast of Sanjay Dutt, Aditya Pancholi, Raveena Tandon, Karisma Kapoor and Atul Agnihotri in lead roles. The supporting cast includes Shakti Kapoor, Gulshan Grover, Kader Khan, Ajit, Tanuja.

The film reworks and combines elements from three earlier crime films, the Indian film Deewaar (1975), the Hong Kong action film A Better Tomorrow (1986), and the American film State of Grace (1990). Upon release, it grossed ₹145 million (equivalent to ₹1.0 billion or US$11 million in 2026) at the Indian box office.

== Premise ==
Baba and Avinash are brothers who live in a shanty house with their widowed mother, who makes a living by working as a housemaid. When a stalker attempts to assault their mother, Baba kills him and the three, along with an orphan named Nawab, take shelter with a crime boss named Uncle. Baba would like Avinash to study and become a better person, and in order to do this, he decides to earn money in the underworld. Avinash completes his training and becomes an Inspector, where his first assignment is to arrest Baba and Nawab - much to his shock as he had never associated Baba with having any criminal background. Avinash must now decide whether to proceed with apprehending Baba and Nawab or resign from the police force.

== Cast ==
- Sanjay Dutt as Baba
- Aditya Pancholi as Nawab
- Raveena Tandon as Nisha
- Karishma Kapoor as Pooja
- Atul Agnihotri as Inspector Avinash "Avi"
- Tanuja as Baba's Mother
- Ajit as Uncle (Underworld Don)
- Kader Khan as Kadar
- Shakti Kapoor as Sunny
- Gulshan Grover as Kaniya
- Vishwajeet Pradhan as Ghulam
- Ram Mohan as Police Commissioner
- Dinesh Hingoo as Aar Paar
- Tiku Talsania as Jarnail Singh
- Mushtaq Khan as Bhiku
- Ghanshyam Rohera as Kainchi
- K.K.Raj as Tony
- Sumeet Pathak as kid Nawab
- Brij Gopal

== Production ==
While writing the screenplay of Aatish, Gupta took inspiration from John Woo's Hong Kong film A Better Tomorrow (1986), which heavily borrowed its storyline from the 1979 Hong Kong film The Brothers, which in turn was a remake of the 1975 Hindi film Deewaar, written by Salim–Javed. Aatish uses elements fairly similar to Deewaar, with Sanjay Dutt as the older criminal brother (inspired by Amitabh Bachchan's character in Deewaar), Atul Agnihotri as the younger police brother (inspired by Shashi Kapoor's character in Deewaar) and Tanuja as the mother. Aatish had a story "straight out of Deewar" but added a twist, with the mother supporting the criminal brother. In addition, Aatish also reworked some plot-points from the 1990 American film State of Grace.

== Soundtrack ==
The music of the film was composed by Nadeem-Shravan and the lyrics were penned by Sameer. According to the Indian trade website Box Office India, with around 2,500,000 units sold, this film's soundtrack album was the year's tenth highest-selling.

#	Title	Singer(s)
1	"Aa Aa Mere Dilruba"	Kumar Sanu, Sapna Mukherjee
2	"Hasratein Hain Bahut Magar"	Kumar Sanu, Sadhana Sargam
3	"Kaash Tum Mujhse Ek Baar Kaho"	Kumar Sanu
4	"Khaate Hain Hum Kasam"	Kumar Sanu, Alka Yagnik
5	"Dil Dil Dil Main Tere Pyar Mein"	Jolly Mukherjee, Alka Yagnik
6	"Ya Mustafa ya Mustafa"	Jolly Mukherjee, Mukul Aggarwal, Alka Yagnik
7	"Baarish Ne Aag Lagayi"	Udit Narayan, Alka Yagnik
8	"Bolo kahan gaye the"	Kumar Sanu, Alka Yagnik
