= Patsy Kar =

Chinese actress from Hong Kong (1935–2022)

- Chinese: 嘉玲
- Born: Ho Pui Ying; Chinese: 何佩英; 1935; Nanhai District, Guangdong, China
- Died: 21 November 2022 (aged 87); Bangkok, Thailand
- Other names: Ga Ling, Jia Ling, Ka Ling, Kar Ling, He Pei-Ying, Ho Kar Ling, Patsy Ka Ling
- Occupation: Actress
- Years active: 1955–1967

Ho Pui Ying (Chinese: 何佩英; 1935 – 21 November 2022) or Patsy Wongsanguan (Thai: พัฒศรี วงศ์สงวน), known professionally as Patsy Kar (Chinese: 嘉玲), was a Chinese actress from Hong Kong with credits in over 70 films. Kar has a star at Avenue of Stars in Hong Kong.

== Early life ==
Kar was born in Guangdong, China.

== Career ==
Kar started her acting career with Lan Kwong Film Company. Kar debuted in A Broken-Hearted Nurse, a 1953 drama film directed by Chen Huan-Wen. In 1955, Kar appeared in The Strange Case of Three Wives, a crime film directed by Poon Bing-Kuen. Kar was most admired in How to Get a Wife, a 1961 comedy film about the urban middle class with office romance directed by Chun Kim. Kar was in The Strange Girl, a 1967 film directed by Wong Yiu. Kar is credited with over 70 films. Kar is notable for her role as a wealthy lady and a social butterfly. In 1967, Kar retired from acting. After retirement, Kar appeared in Money and I, a 1971 comedy film directed by John Law.

== Personal life and death ==
In 1963, Kar married a Thai-Chinese man.

Kar died of chronic obstructive pulmonary disease at her home in Bangkok, on 21 November 2022, at the age of 87.

== Filmography ==
=== Films ===
This is a partial list of films.

- 1955 The Strange Case of Three Wives - Tung Lai-Ying
- 1956 Dragnet
- 1957 Moon Over Malaya (a.k.a. Ye lin yue, The Whispering Palm) (Chinese: 椰林月); Blood Stains the Valley of Love (血染相思谷); China Wife (唐山阿嫂). Note: Parts of the Nanyang Trilogy (南洋三部曲)
- 1961 How to Get a Wife - Wai Ling
- 1964 The Beau - Nurse Chan Suk-On
- 1967 The Strange Girl
- 1967 The Story of a Discharged Prisoner - Mak Siyan
- 1971 Money and I

== Awards ==
- Star. Avenue of Stars. Tsim Sha Tsui waterfront in Hong Kong.

== See also ==
- Patrick Tse
