= Gary Wong =

Hong Kong film historian

- 王冠豪
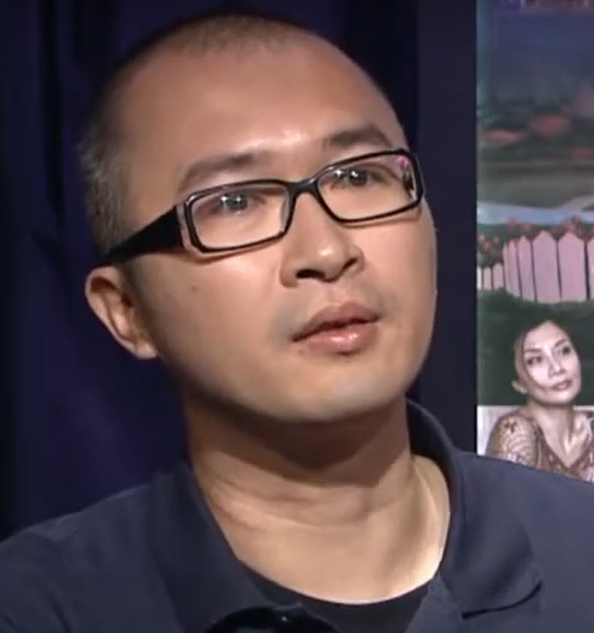
- Wong in May 2014
- Born: Wong Kwun-ho; Kowloon City, Hong Kong
- Occupation: Film historian
- Years active: 2010–present

Gary Wong Kwun-ho (Chinese: 王冠豪) is a Hong Kong film historian known for his research in filming locations. He was a contributor to Hong Kong Cinemagic and founded his film website Film Pilgrimage in 2010.

== Early life and education ==
Wong was born in Kowloon City, Hong Kong, in the 1970s. He has Teochew ancestral roots, with his grandfather and grandmother migrating to Hong Kong before and after the Second World War respectively, settling in San Po Kong. Wong grew up in To Kwa Wan and Kwun Tong, spending most of his childhood in To Kwa Wan and attending secondary school in Kwun Tong during the 1990s. He would also have brief stays in San Po Kong with his grandparents during holidays. He moved to Sha Tin in 1991. He developed a passion for films through the works of Wong Kar-wai, Stanley Kubrick, and Akira Kurosawa, but did not intend to pursue a film-related career. Wong graduated from university with a master's degree in library and information science, during the 1997 Asian financial crisis, which initially led him to seek a stable job. He worked as a property manager, assistant librarian, and archivist for the Hong Kong Tourism Board. His interest in filming locations was sparked when he accompanied Japanese friends on a tour of classic Hong Kong film sites, such as Infernal Affairs. Inspired by the experience, Wong began discovering and visiting filming locations in Hong Kong films, documenting them through his blogs. He later befriended the founder of Hong Kong Cinemagic, an English-French bilingual film news website and database, who was impressed by Wong's blogs and invited him to contribute to the site.

== Film Pilgrimage ==
After developing a deeper interest in film research, Gary Wong left his job at the Hong Kong Tourism Board two years later and founded the film website Film Pilgrimage in 2010. The site operates as both a website and a physical magazine, focusing on filming locations, the history of Hong Kong films, and changes in the cityscape. In 2011, Wong published a non-fiction guidebook also titled Film Pilgrimage, which introduces over 200 filming locations from both domestic and international films, many of which are in Wong's hometown San Po Kong. am730 found the book to be an engaging exploration of familiar film scenes, enhanced by the author's personal journeys through various iconic filming locations, and it serves as practical guidance for fans seeking to experience these sites themselves. Wong explained that he aimed to research films from non-traditional perspectives rather than solely from a textual analysis; while scholar Tong Ching-siu recognized Wong as one of only five writers in Hong Kong who researched and wrote on international film history. In 2014, Wong published Film & Dine, a guidebook about restaurant-related filming locations. In 2017, Wong authored Film Pilgrimage: Taiwan, a sequel documenting filming locations of Taiwanese films. He also began co-hosting guided tours of filming locations with various organizations in the 2020s.

== Bibliography ==
Year	Title	Original title	Publisher	Ref.
2011	Film Pilgrimage	電影朝聖	Green Forest Culture	
2014	Film & Dine	電影美食朝聖遊	Chaoying She	
2017	Film Pilgrimage: Taiwan	電影朝聖: 台灣	Chaoying She	
