= Gun fu =

Style of fictional fighting found in film, television, and videogames

Close range gun fight from the movie Equilibrium, said movie coined the term gun kata.

Gun fu, a portmanteau of gun and kung fu (also known as gun kata, bullet ballet, gymnastic gunplay or bullet arts), is a style of sophisticated close-quarters gunfight resembling a martial arts combat that combines firearms with hand-to-hand combat and traditional melee weapons in a roughly 50/50 ratio. It can be seen in Hong Kong action cinema, and in American action films influenced by it.

The focus of gun fu is both artistic style and the usage of firearms in ways that they were not designed to be used. Shooting a gun from each hand (typically paired with jumping to the side at the same time), dual wielding, shots from behind the back, as well as the use of guns as melee weapons (usually knife fights) are all common. Other moves can involve submachine guns, assault rifles, combat shotguns, rocket launchers, and just about anything else that can be worked into a cinematic shot. It is often mixed with grappling maneuvers.

Gun fu has become a staple of modern action films due to its visual spectacle, a result of impressive choreography and stuntwork, regardless of its unrealistic elements when compared to real-life gun warfare.

== Hong Kong origins ==
As the name suggests, gun fu has roots in martial arts films from Hong Kong action cinema, including wuxia films and kung fu films from the likes of Bruce Lee and Jackie Chan. These films usually involved martial artists fighting large numbers of enemies in stylized choreographed action set-pieces, with a fighting style that was somewhere between brawling and dancing. Hong Kong filmmaker John Woo, who began his career directing martial arts films, took the martial arts style of action and added guns, combining the elegance and precision of kung fu with the brutality and violence of gangster films.

John Woo originated the style that would later be called gun fu in the 1986 Hong Kong action film A Better Tomorrow. The film launched the "heroic bloodshed" genre in Hong Kong, and gun fu action sequences became a regular feature in many of the subsequent heroic bloodshed films. John Woo continued to make several classic heroic bloodshed films, all featuring gun fu, and all starring leading man Chow Yun-fat.

Anthony Leong wrote of the gunfights in A Better Tomorrow,

Before 1986, Hong Kong cinema was firmly rooted in two genres: the martial arts film and the comedy. Gunplay was not terribly popular because audiences had considered it boring, compared to fancy kung fu moves or graceful swordplay of wuxia epics. What moviegoers needed was a new way to present gunplay—to show it as a skill that could be honed, integrating the acrobatics and grace of the traditional martial arts. And that's exactly what John Woo did. Using all of the visual techniques available to him (tracking shots, dolly-ins, slo-mo), Woo created beautifully surrealistic action sequences that were a 'guilty pleasure' to watch. There is also intimacy found in the gunplay—typically, his protagonists and antagonists will have a profound understanding of one another and will meet face-to-face, in a tense Mexican standoff where they each point their weapons at one another and trade words.

Stephen Hunter, writing in The Washington Post said,

Woo saw gunfights in musical terms: His primary conceit was the shootout as dance number, with great attention paid to choreography, the movement of both actors within the frame. He loved to send his shooters flying through the air in surprising ways, far more poetically than in any real-life scenario. He frequently diverted to slow motion and he specialized in shooting not merely to kill, but to riddle—his shooters often blast their opponents five and six times.

Other Hong Kong directors also began using gun fu sequences in films that were not strictly heroic bloodshed films, such as Wong Jing's God of Gamblers (1989) and its sequel God of Gamblers Returns (1994). There were several heroic bloodshed films that did not feature gun fu, but opted for more realistic combat, such as Ringo Lam's City on Fire (1987).

== Spread to the United States ==
The popularity of John Woo films, and the heroic bloodshed genre in general, in the U.S. helped give gun fu greater visibility. Some of the earliest Hollywood productions not directed by Woo that adopted the style were Desperado (1995) and The Replacement Killers (1998), the latter starring Chow Yun-fat.

The success of The Matrix (1999) helped to popularize and develop the style in the U.S. One classic gun fu move consists of reloading two pistols simultaneously by releasing the empty magazines, pointing the guns to the ground, dropping two fresh magazines out of one's jacket sleeves, or strapped to one's legs, into the guns, and then continue shooting. The style is also featured, albeit in a small way and with the assistance of gadgets, in Lara Croft: Tomb Raider (2001). In Equilibrium (2002), the law enforcement responsible for handling "Sense Crime" are trained in "gun kata" to gain an advantage in their raids on armed opponents. In the film Bulletproof Monk (2003), The Monk With No Name (portrayed by Yun-fat) empties two pistols, ejects the magazines and spins to kick the magazines at his assailants. This was parodied in an episode of Brooklyn Nine-Nine (Season 1, Episode 19 "Tactical Village"). Underworld (2003) brought The Matrix's aesthetic from the cyberpunk subgenre into the dark fantasy realm, including its gunplay. In Wanted (2008), assassins belonging to The Fraternity possess the skill of "bending" bullets around obstacles. In a gunfight early in the film, one assassin knocks another bullet out of the air with his own round. In X-Men Origins: Wolverine (2009), Agent Zero (Daniel Henney) reloads his handguns by throwing them into the air and catching them with the magazines he is holding in his hands.

In the 2010 film Kick-Ass, the character Hit Girl, played by Chloë Grace Moretz, frequently uses gun fu. In the 2012 film Django Unchained, the climactic shootout in Candieland is inspired by John Woo, replicating scenes from his 1989 classic The Killer shot-by-shot. The 2013 G.I. Joe: Retaliation utilized gun fu in the climactic fight between Roadblock and Firefly. The style is also heavily featured in 2014's John Wick, as well as 2015's Kingsman: The Secret Service.

A gun fu sequence involving Chris Redfield and Glenn Arias is showcased in the 2017 CGI film Resident Evil: Vendetta. Although produced in Japan, the Resident Evil franchise takes the majority of its inspiration from American horror and action cinema.

== Other media ==
=== Video games ===
Video games, particularly in the shooter and shoot 'em up genres, have implemented gun fu-like gameplay. Below are some examples of video games and video game series which have been specifically compared to or described as gun fu:

- In Tales of, Bandai Namco's JRPG series, there are several characters who use guns as their specialized combat style: Legretta in Tales of the Abyss, Iria Animi and Ricardo Soldato in Tales of Innocence, Hubert Ozwell in Tales of Graces, Alvin in Tales of Xillia, Ludger Will Kresnik in Tales of Xillia 2 and Shionne Vymer Imeris Daymore in Tales of Arise.
- In Square Enix's JRPG Xenogears, Billy Lee Black is a high gun fu expert.
- The "bullet time" gameplay of the Max Payne series has been described as gun fu.
- The "CQC" fighting style in the Metal Gear video game series integrates the use of firearms into martial arts.
- The 2005 first-person shooter game F.E.A.R. also has firefight combat inspired by gun fu.
- The 2007 third-person shooter game Stranglehold, which serves as a sequel to John Woo's 1992 film Hard Boiled, features gun fu gameplay elements.
- The 2008 fighting game series BlazBlue features a fighter who specializes in this fighting style in Noel Vermillion.
- The 2012 video game Sleeping Dogs incorporates gun fu elements into its martial arts gameplay.
- The 2015 action role-playing game Fallout 4 includes an ability, or perk, called "Gun Fu", which awards bonus points to the player for targeting multiple enemies while in the gameplay feature known as the Vault-Tec Assisted Targeting System (V.A.T.S.).
- The 2019 shoot 'em up game My Friend Pedro features gameplay elements that have been referred to as gun fu.
- The 2005 survival horror game Resident Evil 4 emphasizes injuring enemies with gunshots and then performing martial arts on them while they are stunned.
- The hack and slash game series Bayonetta features combat that revolves around using guns in her hands and on her heels to execute kung fu like combos while weaving in shooting.
- The 2019 virtual reality action-rhythm game Pistol Whip allows the player to dual-wield pistols in a homage to gun kata. The game also features other elements from gun fu films like dodging bullets in slow motion and awarding extra points for shooting enemies in rhythm with the music track.
- Planned for release in 2026, SPINE is a cyberpunk action beat 'em up game that highlights gun fu style combat as one of its key features.

=== Comic books ===
Gun Fu is also the name of a series of comic books by Howard M. Shum and Joey Mason, about a Hong Kong police officer in the 1930s who employs a combination of gunplay and martial arts.

=== Pen-and-paper games ===
It is not certain where or when the actual term "gun fu" was invented. One of the earliest written records exists in the tabletop role-playing game Cyberpunk 2020 which was first published in 1988.

Gun fu is a form of specialized martial arts usable in the game and is described as,

Gun Fu: completely geared around mastery of the handgun, this form makes a firearm truly an extension of the user. Students are only taught the basics of surviving a gunfight: stay constantly moving, fire till your opponent is dead (preferably from as close a distance as possible), count your shots, when you are out don't hesitate to find another weapon instead of taking the time to reload yours (the dead guy on the floor won't be needing his anymore right). If you are hit don't think about it till you're dead or your enemies are, never panic and above all keep your opponent on the defensive. Once a student has learned the basics the only way for him to advance in his art is through combat, so beginners don't stay beginners long, they are either killed or they become better. A master is a truly magnificent sight in a gun battle.

Conspiracy X, another tabletop RPG first published in 1996, also included the combat style as a usable skill. In this game, gun fu allowed players' characters to use firearms in close combat and skilled martial artists to string together combinations of moves.

In the Buffyverse role-playing games, gun fu is the name for the firearms skill, but this is more likely meant to be humorous rather than to imply characters practice an actual firearm-based martial art. In the Ninjas and Superspies supplement Mystic China, gun fu is the Triad assassin training, and is a martial arts skill that can be available to player characters. It primarily emphasizes the use of paired 9mm pistols.

In Run & Gun, an expansion of the fifth-edition of the pen-and-paper role-playing game Shadowrun, gun fu is a combat style available.

The GURPS roleplaying system has a Gun-Fu supplement, written by S.A. Fisher, Sean Punch, and Hans-Christian Vortisch.

=== Television ===
In the Japanese series Tokusou Sentai Dekaranger, Banban "Ban" Akaza a.k.a. DekaRed is specifically mentioned as a master of gun fu technique, which in the series is called as "Juu Kun Do" (jū is the Japanese word for 'gun', and the name of the style is a play on Jeet Kune Do). As a result, the mecha for the series, Dekaranger Robo, is also sometimes shown using gun fu. The American adaptation of the series, Power Rangers S.P.D., also shows the Red Ranger Jack Landors and the Delta Squad Megazord using the same technique, though that was more because of the source material – Jack is not specifically mentioned as being a master of gun fu.

In the anime Mazinkaizer SKL, Ryou Magami (one of the two pilots of the titular Mazinkaiser) uses gun fu as his primary style of combat as he wields the Breast Triggers, a pair of handguns which store on Mazinkaiser's chest. Magami's fight scenes contain several visual homages to the film Equilibrium, including a scene in the first episode where Mazinkaiser performs the signature pose of the Grammaton Clerics.

== See also ==
- Apache revolver
- Bayonet
- Buttstroke
- Combat pistol shooting
- Dual wield
- Girls with guns
- Gunspinning
- Heroic bloodshed
- Hōjutsu
- Kayakujutsu
- Krav Maga
- Pistol sword
- Pistol-whipping
- Wire fu
