= The Story of a Discharged Prisoner =

1967 Hong Kong film by Patrick Lung Kong

- Film poster
- Directed by: Patrick Lung
- Written by: Patrick Lung
- Produced by: Ho Kin-yip
- Starring: Patrick Tse; Patsy Ka Ling; Wong Wai; Shih Kien
- Cinematography: Chan Kon
- Edited by: Sung Ming; Wong Yee-Shun
- Music by: Eddie Wang
- Production company: San Aau (Xinyi) Movie-Making Company
- Release date: 13 September 1967
- Running time: 118 minutes
- Country: Hong Kong
- Language: Cantonese

The Story of a Discharged Prisoner (Chinese: 英雄本色; also called Upright Repenter) is a 1967 Hong Kong crime drama film directed by Patrick Lung and starring Patrick Tse, Shih Kien and Patsy Kar.

The film partially inspired the 1986 John Woo film A Better Tomorrow, which has the same Chinese name. A Better Tomorrow combined plot elements of this film with the 1979 movie The Brothers, which in turn was a remake of 1975 Indian movie Deewaar.

== Plot ==
Lee Cheuk-hong (Patrick Tse) was a safecracker who was caught and spent more than 10 years behind bars. When One-Eyed Dragon (Sek Kin), leader of an organized crime syndicate, learns Lee Cheuk-hong will be released, he sends his men to ask Lee to join his gang.

== Cast ==
- Patrick Tse – Lee Cheuk-hong
- Patsy Kar – Mok Si-Yan
- Wong Wai – Lee Chi-sum
- Sek Kin – Boss Lung, One-eyed Dragon
- Mak Kei – Lung's thug
- Patrick Lung – Inspector Lui
- Chan Tsai-Chung – Anna/Siu Yee-Tai
- Sai Gwa-Pau – Ah Hon
- Mang Lee – Betty/Boss' girl
- Chow Gat – Lung's crony
- Do Ping – Kit
- Szema Wah Lung – Chi-Sum's boss
- Ma Siu-Ying – Mother
- Yeung Yip-Wang – Anna's father
- Wong Hak – Cripple
- Hui Ying-Ying – Ah Hon's wife
- Lee Sau-Kei – Anna's uncle
- Lam Yuk
- Chan Chung-Kin – DPAS chief
- Lee Keng-Ching – Shelter resident
- Chan Kau Fai
- Chan Lap-Ban – Squatter's village resident
- Go Chiu – Shelter resident
- Tang Cheung – Night watchman
- Chow Wai-Fong
- Fung Ming – Policeman
- Cheung Chok-Chow – Gang lawyer

== Awards ==
In 2005, Story of a Discharged Prisoner was ranked 39th on the Hong Kong Film Awards list of the Top 100 Chinese Films. In 2012, it was ranked number 21 on TimeOut Hong Kong Greatest 100 Hong Kong Films.
