= Wong Tai Sin Children's Choir =

Location
- 1/F, Wong Tai Sin Community Centre, 104 Ching Tak Street, Wong Tai Sin, Kowloon, Hong Kong

Information
- Type: Children's choir
- Website: www.wtscchk.com

Wong Tai Sin Children's Choir (WTSCC; 黃大仙兒童合唱團) is a well-known children's choirs in Hong Kong. The Director of Music and Chief Tutor is Madam Lola Young, who had her musical training in Italy, and the Choirmaster is Mr Jason Hung.

Founded in 1973, the choir has often been invited to perform/ record songs for various important events such as television/radio shows, films, concerts, advertisements (especially at Christmas and Chinese New Year), etc.

== Introduction ==
Wong Tai Sin Children's Choir, the first district children's choir in Hong Kong, was founded in 1973. Its establishment went back to July in 1972. The former Leisure and Cultural Services Department held a Community Children's Singing Competition. The excellent result reflected that there were numerous musically talented children living in Wong Tai Sin. Wong Tai Sin Children's Choir was established with the help of the Government and non-government organization to become an independent registered charitable organization. Its establishment aims at developing member's musical potential and community consciousness through well-steered musical activities. Formerly members were confined to children of Wong Tai Sin District. To cope with the demand, the choir has extended its membership by considering applications from children of other districts as well. In early 1978, youth group was first established. Wong Tai Sin Youth Choir was established in 1982 because of the expansion of the youth group. Since April 1979, a scholarship / bursary fund has been established for members who have interest and potential to furthering their vocal and instrumental training but are financially unable to pay for the training fees. With its association of the Social and Welfare Department, a suite on the 1st floor of Wong Tai Sin Community Centre is allocated to the Choir in 1980.

== Aims ==
1. To develop the musical and other artistic potentials of children with formal training.
2. To encourage and guide children to pursue music-making as a lifelong passion.
3. To help children develop an all-rounded personality.
4. To promote community consciousness.

== Organization ==
In addition to the Director of Music and the Choirmaster, the executive committees comprise representation from welfare and charitable organizations, schools in the district, as well as religious associations.

== Financial support ==
The following financial support maintains the choir:

1. Charity trust from society
2. Funding from District Council
3. Choir members' training fees
4. Donations from various organizations for the children's participation in concerts by invitations

== Choir members ==
The choir consists of four groups: Infant, Small Children, Junior Children, and Teenage. The children attend regular training sessions each Saturday at the Wong Tai Sin Community under qualified choir conductors and piano accompanists. In addition to vocal training, members are also provided with opportunities to receive private instrumental coaching, such as piano, violin, etc.

== Performances ==
TV shows
Musicals
Movies
Concerts
Advertisements
