= The Brothers (1979 film) =

1979 Hong Kong film by Hua Shan

- Film poster
- Directed by: Hua Shan
- Written by: Lam Chin Wai; Yuen Cheung
- Story by: Salim–Javed
- Based on: Deewaar by Salim–Javed
- Produced by: Runme Shaw
- Starring: Tony Liu; Danny Lee Sau-Yin; Ku Feng; Chau Li Chuan; Nam Hung
- Cinematography: Cheung Tak-Wai; Nico Wong Man-Wan
- Edited by: Chiang Hsing-Lung; Chang Shao-Hsi
- Music by: Frankie Chan
- Production company: Shaw Brothers Studio
- Distributed by: Shaw Brothers Studio
- Release date: 27 April 1979
- Running time: 88 minutes
- Country: Hong Kong
- Languages: Cantonese; Mandarin
- Box office: HK$556,266

The Brothers (Cantonese: 差人大佬搏命仔 Cha yan daai liu bok meng chai, Mandarin: Cha ren da lao bo ming zai) is a 1979 Hong Kong action crime-drama film directed by Hua Shan, written by Lam Chin Wai and Yuen Cheung, and produced by Runme Shaw under the Shaw Brothers Studio. The film stars Tony Liu, Danny Lee Sau-Yin, Chau Li Chuan, Ku Feng, and Nam Hung. It is a remake of Indian action crime-drama film Deewaar (1975), written by Salim–Javed. In turn, The Brothers inspired John Woo's A Better Tomorrow and played a key role in the creation of the heroic bloodshed crime genre of 1980s Hong Kong action cinema.

== Plot ==
Hong Kong Cinemagic provides the following plot summary.

Liu Yung, one of Bruce Lee's favorite co-stars, is the brother whose destiny is to become a top mobster. Danny Lee (future co-star of John Woo's The Killer) is the brother fated to become a cop. More than five years before John Woo was to play out the same conflict in his international film festival favorite A Better Tomorrow, the Shawscope screen was filled with similarly powerful blood, sweat, and tears.

== Cast ==
The following are the film's main cast members.

- Tony Liu (Lau Wing) as Zhang Zhigang
- Danny Lee Sau-Yin as Inspector Zhang Zhiqiang
- Chow Lai-Kuen as Yanfen
- Ku Feng as Boss Qian Laosan
- Nam Hung as Mother Zhang
- Chiang Tao as Zhou Hei / Blackie
- Ricky Wong Chung-Tsu as Young Zhigang
- Harada Riki as Father Zhang
- Chan Shen as Boss Huang Shou Ren
- Alan Chan Kwok-Kuen as Huang's assistant
- Wang Han-Chen as Dock worker
- Yang Chi-Ching as Police chief
- Wong Ching-Ho as Mr. Wang
- Hung Ling-Ling as Mrs. Wang

== Production ==
The Brothers is a remake of Deewaar (The Wall), a 1975 Indian crime film. Written by Salim–Javed (Salim Khan and Javed Akhtar) and directed by Yash Chopra, the story was loosely inspired by the Bombay underworld gangster Haji Mastan. The original film stars Bollywood superstar Amitabh Bachchan (as the criminal brother played by Tony Liu), Shashi Kapoor (as the cop brother played by Danny Lee), Nirupa Roy (as the mother played by Nam Hung) and Iftekhar (in the role played by Ku Feng). The Brothers is a mostly faithful remake, with many of the same scenes, as well as dialogues transcribed directly from the original in many places.

There are some notable differences. It has a shorter 90-minute length, compared to the original's 176 minutes. Other changes reflect the shift from Indian culture to Chinese culture, such as the setting changed from Bombay to Hong Kong, and the Bombay underworld changed to the Chinese triads. There are also cultural references changed to reflect Chinese culture; for example, the number on the criminal brother's badge is changed from 786, a number with symbolic significance in Islam, to 838, which signifies the Chinese Year of the Horse.

== Legacy ==
The Brothers played a key role in the creation of the heroic bloodshed crime genre of 1980s Hong Kong action cinema. Plot elements of The Brothers was reimagined for John Woo's internationally acclaimed breakthrough A Better Tomorrow (1986), which involved a similar conflict between two brothers on opposing sides of the law. In particular, Ti Lung's character in A Better Tomorrow is similar to Tony Liu's character in The Brothers (in turn based on Amitabh Bachchan's character in Deewaar). In turn, A Better Tomorrow was a landmark film, credited with creating the heroic bloodshed genre, which was influential in Hong Kong action cinema, and later Hollywood. The Brothers also established Danny Lee (playing Sashi Kapoor's character from Deewaar) with a police officer persona later seen in Hong Kong crime films such as Woo's The Killer (1989).
