= Hong Kong Cinemagic =

Hong Kong film website

- Hong Kong Cinemagic homepage in March 2009
- Website type: Online movie database
- Available in: English; French
- Creators: Marc Delcambre; Thomas Podvin; Jean-Louis Ogé
- Website: hkcinemagic.com (Archived)
- Commercial: No
- Registration: None
- Launched: November 10, 2004
- Current status: Inactive

Hong Kong Cinemagic, sometimes referred to as HKCinemagic, was a bilingual (French and English) website providing a repository for information about Chinese language films from Hong Kong, China and Taiwan, and the people who created them. The website contained news, interviews, film reviews and a database of people, films and film studios as well as an illustrated glossary of terms. The web magazine existed in various forms for over two decades. As of March 2009, the database contains over 10,000 films. The site was updated for the last time in December 2017.

The site was designed and was maintained by Marc Delcambre, Jean-Louis Ogé and Thomas Podvin. The key staff and editors were Stéphane Jaunin, Arnaud Lanuque, Van-Thuan Ly, Philippe Quevillart and David-Olivier Vidouze.

== History ==
The original HKCinemagic1 site was created in late 1998 by Laurent Henry and Thomas Podvin, and initially hosted on Wanadoo France, it began as a site dedicated to directors Tsui Hark and Wong Kar-wai. As the site expanded with new contributors coming on board and more articles being written, it was transferred to ifrance.com. A database of filmographies, identity photos and biographies was soon put in place by team member Jean-Louis Ogé.

In February 2003, along with editors Arnaud Lanuque, Stéphane Jaunin, Philippe Quevillart and David-Olivier Vidouze, Ogé created HKCinemagic2, an encyclopedia of Hong Kong cinema. The site containing photo galleries of casts and crew members focuses on the films of Shaw Brothers Studio, "gweilos" (foreigners) in the Hong Kong film industry and Category 3 films. The content on the two sites continued to increase and a French forum was installed, initially on Hiwit.com in June 2003. In May 2004, a bilingual French and English board was installed on Invision. As of March 2009, the Invision forum has more than 4,000 registered users.

After Laurent Henry left the project, HKCinemagic1 and HKCinemagic2 were merged, creating the last incarnation of Hong Kong Cinemagic (hkcinemagic.com). The new site was designed by Marc Delcambre, Jean-Louis Ogé and Thomas Podvin and was launched in November 2004. Similar to HKMDB, the database can be searched by film title or by person's name. For the six months up to February 2009, the site attracted an average of 17,700 visitors per month from the US alone.

== Critical reception ==
Industry professionals and Hong Kong films fans have referred to HKCinemagic as a "site with unparalleled depth of information on Hong Kong cinema", and as an indispensable site that "possesses a wealth of articles and interviews (in French and English)".

Hong Kong Cinemagic has been used as a resource for reference and notes by scholars, critics, film institutions such as the Cinémathèque Française, the French film Archive in Paris, and specialised websites.

== Data ==
Hong Kong Cinemagic contained credits for cast and crew members, portrait galleries, screenshots and trailers, as well as reviews written in-house and special notes of information on films. Additional information about alternative titles, titles in Chinese and pinyin, production company, country of origin, genre, release date, box office gross and languages spoken is included where known. Information about cast and crew members may include gender, birth dates and biographies.

In addition to browsing with the website's own search engines, film can be browsed by date, name and genre, and people can be browsed by name and role. A person's filmography can be displayed by date, genre, and activity and/or by selecting solely Hong Kong productions or productions from all countries. The site also provides information on film companies and studios, the dates companies were founded and by whom, and the films they have released or distributed. A glossary of terms specific to Chinese cinema and Chinese culture is also available.

As of March 2009, there are over 10,000 films and over 17,000 people in the database, as well as information on 1,300 studios. There are 26,500 images and 2,000 trailers and other videos. In addition, the site contains biographies, film reviews, interviews, feature articles, and reports.

Hong Kong correspondents and editors have interviewed many key figures of the Hong Kong film industry. In-depth interviews of actors, directors, and film technicians are available in English and/or in French. Past interviewees have included Johnnie To, Patrick Tam, Wong Jing, Anthony Wong, Eric Tsang, Peter Chan, Lawrence Ah Mon, Gordon Liu, Ti Lung, Stanley Kwan and Chen Kuan Tai.

In contrast to databases such as HKMDB and IMDb, Hong Kong Cinemagic does not include the names of the characters that actors played in their films. However, the film pages often do include comprehensive image galleries of cast and crew.

== See also ==
- Hong Kong Movie Database
