= Orange News =

Hong Kong news website

- Type: Online-only news
- Editor-in-chief: Chen Ching-wai
- Founded: 2014
- Political alignment: Pro-Beijing
- Language: Chinese; English
- Website: www.orangenews.hk

Orange News (Chinese: 橙新聞) is a Hong Kong news website established in 2014. The site is owned by Sino United Publishing and funded by the Hong Kong Liaison Office, with its editorial stance generally regarded as pro-Beijing.

== History ==
Orange News was established by Sino United Publishing under its subsidiary, Cloud Connect Technology (Chinese: 雲通科技), in December 2014, targeting both residents of the Greater Bay Area and the Hong Kong diaspora. Mass media scholar Ryan Ho Kilpatrick considered that the name "Orange News" is meant to position the outlet in opposition to the pro-democratic media Apple Daily. Orange News also owns multiple subsidiaries, including the YouTube channels Warm Talking (圍爐), Why Do We Dream (發緊夢), and All About Money (搵錢呢啲嘢), the Facebook page "Culture Is..."(文化本事), and the TikTok channel "Hong Kong Drifters Have A Say" (港漂有話說). In April 2015, Next Magazine reported that Orange News was controlled by the Hong Kong Liaison Office, as investigative reports revealed that Sino United Publishing was owned by a shell company, Guangdong New Culture Development (廣東新文化事業發展), which was fully owned by the Liaison Office and held 99.99% and 88.44% shares in Ta Kung Pao and Wen Wei Po, respectively. The website was also funded by the Liaison Office. Following this revelation, media outlets widely referred Orange News as being under the control of the Liaison Office.

In October 2015, Apple Daily sued Orange News for reproducing two articles related to an undercover investigation on unlicensed cosmetic treatments. By February 2016, a special report on Hong Kong online media by Super Media listed Orange News as not among the top 20 most active online media outlets in Hong Kong, and it ranked 1,174th among Hong Kong websites according to Alexa Internet. In October 2018, the Hong Kong Journalists Association publicly criticized Orange News for publishing articles with biased commentary, labeling it as a propaganda outlet that influences public opinion, while also expressing concern that its stable government funding allowed it to outcompete independent outlets and monopolize voices in the media.

In January 2023, during the national security trial of former Stand News chief editor Chung Pui-kuen, the prosecution cited opinion pieces from Orange News that criticized Stand News for its editorial stance, which allegedly "glorified violent protests" and "violated national security laws". In November 2024, Warm Talking produced a short film titled Birdcage (鳥籠), coinciding with the national security trial of Apple Daily founder Jimmy Lai, where the film was perceived as satirical toward Apple Daily and was reported on by other state-owned media, including Ta Kung Pao.

== Editorial stance ==
The editorial stance of Orange News is perceived as pro-Beijing, with Bloomberg describing it as "propaganda" planted by the Chinese government in Hong Kong. Fu Chun-kit, a non-executive director of Orange News' parent company Cloud Connect Technology, described their journalists only as "having a sense of patriotism" but "maintaining neutrality", stating "they would not publish content according to external editorial instructions". Political commentator Martin Oei criticized Orange News for its close political ties, stating that "people in Hong Kong who know its background do not read it"; while Lee Bat-fong from Apple Daily noted that Orange News was allowed to cut the queue and interview Zhang Xiaoming before other media at a press conference in 2015, and they distributed numerous souvenirs at the Hong Kong Book Fair, raising questions about their editorial independence and suggesting that their financial advantages create unfair competition with other non-governmental outlets. Kilpatrick, in his analysis of articles published by Orange News in the aftermath of the 2019–2020 Hong Kong protests, observed that the political commentaries often "echoed CCP language", while the news reports tended to emphasize or omit critical context in favor of the government and pro-establishment political parties. He also found that Orange News' articles often lack diverse sourcing, with some stories coming directly from government press releases or the official state media China Today.

A 2022 study conducted jointly by City University of Hong Kong and Hong Kong Polytechnic University found that Orange News was one of the online media outlets that maintained a relatively neutral tone when reporting on ethnic minorities in Hong Kong, with only 0.3% of the articles containing racist or stereotypical language.
