= Hong Kong Film Critics Society =

The Hong Kong Film Critics Society (HKFCS; Traditional Chinese: 香港電影評論學會), founded in 1995, is the peak organization of film critics and professionals in Hong Kong. It is also a member of FIPRESCI.

== Objectives ==
The objectives of the Hong Kong Film Critics Society are:

- to unite all critics who share our common goal;
- to foster an independent spirit of film criticism;
- to encourage critical writing on Hong Kong cinema from the perspectives of culture and art;
- to reaffirm the achievements of Hong Kong cinema.

== HKinema ==
The society also places great value on its quarterly journal HKinema, launched in 2007.

== See also ==
- Hong Kong Film Critics Society Award
