= Max Mok =

- Born: Mok Siu-chung; 2 December 1960 (age 65); Hong Kong
- Occupations: Actor; singer
- Years active: 1980–present

Chinese name
- Traditional Chinese: 莫少聰
- Simplified Chinese: 莫少聪
Transcriptions
Standard Mandarin
- Hanyu Pinyin: Mò Shǎo Cóng
Yue: Cantonese
- Jyutping: Mok6 Siu3 Cung1
- Musical career
- Also known as: Benny Mok; Benny Mok Siu-chung; Max Mok Siu-chung
- Genres: Cantopop, Mandopop
- Labels: 可登唱片 藝能動音 金點唱片

Max Mok (Chinese: 莫少聰; born 2 December 1960 in Hong Kong; also credited as Benny Mok, Benny Mok Siu-chung and Max Mok Siu-chung) is a Hong Kong actor and singer. Mok was recruited by the Shaw Brothers Studio and has been a major film star since the 1980s. Mok is perhaps best known as Leung Foon in Once Upon a Time in China II, III, IV and V, after replacing Yuen Biao who was in the first film. In the Philippines, he is known as Bronson Lee.

== History and early career ==
=== Acting ===
In 1980s, Mok played an Interpol Agent in 1986 film Magic Crystal along with Andy Lau, Cynthia Rothrock and Richard Norton. Mok played second member of Col Young's commando in 1987 film Eastern Condors, alongside Sammo Hung, Yuen Biao, Joyce Godenzi, Yuen Wah, Billy Chow, Corey Yuen and Yuen Woo-ping.

In 1990s, Mok replaced Yuen Biao, when Yuen declined to reprise his role after the first film was finished. Mok played Leung Foon in four Once Upon a Time in China movies they were: Once Upon a Time in China II, III, IV and V alongside Jet Li, Rosamund Kwan and Vincent Zhao. After Once Upon a Time in China V, Mok didn't appear in the sixth sequel and nobody will replacing him.

In 2000s, Mok played Suk Gwat in the 2004 film Love Is a Many Stupid Thing alongside Shawn Yue Man-lok. Mok played Big Eyes in 2008 film Run Papa Run alongside Louis Koo and Nora Miao.

== Filmography ==
=== Film ===
- Usurpers of Emperor's Power (1983) ... Prince De Zhao
- The Lady Assassin (1983) ... 14th Prince
- The Enchantress (1983) ... Feng Xiwu
- Holy Flame of the Martial World (1983) ... Yin Tien Chu
- Thunderclap (1984)
- My Mind, Your Body (1985)
- Journey of the Doomed (1985) ... Swallow 13
- Magic Crystal (1986) ... Interpol agent
- Eastern Condors (1987) ... Soldier sitting in staging area
- Hero of Tomorrow (1988) ... Crow Yeung Tin Shin
- The Dragon Family (1988) ... Chung
- Three Wishes (1988) ... Sing
- Lai Shi, China's Last Eunuch (1988) ... Liu Lai-Shi
- Faithfully Yours (1988) ... Big Eye/Ki Ho-Yan
- Blood Call (1988)
- Close Escape (1989) ... Lam Wai Leung
- Long Arm of the Law Part 3 (1989) ... Chicken Heart
- Path of Glory (1989) ... Stanley Tang
- Hearts No Flowers (1989) ... Paul Poon On Dah
- Pedicab Driver (1989) ... Malted Candy
- Seven Warriors (1989) ... Yung
- Little Cop (1989) ... Mei Yen Xin
- City Kids 1989 (1989) ... Chow Chor-San
- Lucky Star (1989)
- Ghost Fever (1989) ... Hui Zen
- Lung Fung Restaurant (1990) ... Lung Ching
- The Outlaw Brothers (1990) ... Bond
- That's Money (1990)
- Never Say Regret (1990) ... Jimmy
- The Fortune Code (1990) ... Little Candy
- Whampoa Blues (1990) ... Luo Ying Cong
- An Eye for an Eye (1990) ... Chung
- Family Honor (1990) ... Chung
- No Way Back (1990)
- Son on the Run (1991) ... Hung Long
- Off Track (1991) ... Joe
- Mission of Condor (1991) ... Chow Man - Stephen
- Sisters in Law (1992) ... Tsui Tung
- Night Life Hero (1992) ... Chung
- Once Upon a Time in China II (1992) ... Leung Foon
- Summer Lover (1992) ... Chung
- The Twilight of the Forbidden City (1992) ... Loy Hay / Eunuch Chun Lu
- Secret Signs (1993) ... Yung Wing Kam
- Slave of the Sword (1993) ... Eunuch Li
- Once Upon a Time in China III (1993) ... Leung Foon
- Once Upon a Time in China IV (1993) ... Leung Foon
- Angel of the Road (1993)
- The Assassin (1993) ... Wang Kou
- No Regret, No Return (1993) ... Victor
- Fait Accompli (1994) ... Wong Chun-Wai
- Lantern (1994)
- Once Upon a Time in China V (1994) ... Leung Foon
- Gambling Baron (1994) ... Chen Chun
- How Deep Is Your Love (1994) ... Joe
- Fire Dragon (1994) ... Yuen Ming
- Heart of Killer (1995) ... Gung Gwan
- Dangerous Duty (1996) ... Chung
- Top Borrower (1997)
- Happy Together (1997) ... Chow Lik Ping
- Nightmare Zone (1998) ... Simon Chu/Ho Sun [2 Roles]
- The Doctor in Spite of Himself (1999) ... Secret Officer Pak Yeung
- The Golden Nightmare (1999) ... Prof. Li Kuo Wan
- One Drop of Blood Per Step (2000)
- D7 SDU (2000)
- Romancing Bullet (2000) ... AK
- Forever Love (2001)
- Revenge (2002) ... Ah Jun
- Crazy Guy (2002)
- No Place to Go (2003)
- Star Runner (2003) ... Bullshit Bill
- Resistless Mission (2004)
- Cho Tai Yan Yuan (2004)
- Love Is a Many Stupid Thing (2004) ... Ghost
- In the Blue (2006)
- Si Da Jin Chai (2007)
- Run Papa Run (2008) ... Big Eyes
- Super Player (2010) ... Martial arts hero
- Just Try Me (2012) ... Doctor
- 7 Assassins (2012) ... Chen Mu Bai
- Fox Fairy (2012)
- Careful Man Without a Shadow (2013)
- Desperado (2014)
- The Gift of the Life (2014)
- The Apparition (2016)

=== TV series ===
- Princess Chang Ping (1980) ATV
- Dynasty (1980)
- Operation Nuwa (1981)
- Ode to Gallantry (1985)
- Maple Leaf Saga (1985 Taiwan TTV TV series) (1985)
- Fire Phoenix (1986 Taiwan TTV TV series) (1986)
- Wong Fei Hung Series (1995)

== Discography ==
=== Albums ===
Album	Title	Language	Year of Release	Label(s)
1st	半个情人	Mandarin	1992.01	可登唱片
2nd	還是愛妳	Cantonese	1993	艺能动音
3rd	與你相逢	Mandarin	1994	金点唱片
4th	牽絆一生的愛	Mandarin	1994	金点唱片
5th	你在九月离开	Mandarin	1995.09	可登唱片

== Awards ==
Years	Awards
1984	Hong Kong Film Award: Nominated Best New Performer (Holy Flame of the Martial World) (武林聖火令)
1989	Hong Kong Film Award: Nominated Best Actor (Last Eunuch in China) (中國最後一個太監)

== Personal life ==
Mok was arrested in Beijing on Friday, 15 April 2011, for alleged drug abuse.

== See also ==
- Tsui Hark-Hong Kong Director
- Once Upon a Time in China about legendary Chinese folk hero, Wong Fei Hung-Hong Kong action film written and directed by Tsui Hark
