= 11th Hong Kong Film Awards =

1992 Hong Kong Film Awards

- Date: 5 April 1992
- Hosted by: Philip Chan and Lawrence Cheng

The 11th Hong Kong Film Awards ceremony, honored the best films of 1991 and took place on 5 April 1992 at Hong Kong Academy for Performing Arts, Wan Chai, Hong Kong. The ceremony was hosted by Philip Chan and Lawrence Cheng, during the ceremony awards are presented in 15 categories.

== Awards ==
Winners are listed first, highlighted in boldface, and indicated with a double dagger (‡).

| **Best Film**: **To Be Number One**‡; Lee Rock; This Thing Called Love; Once Upon a Time in China; Once a Thief | **Best Director**: **Tsui Hark — Once Upon a Time in China**‡; John Woo — Once a Thief; Gordon Chan — Fight Back to School; Poon Man Kit — To Be Number One; Lawrence Ah Mon — Lee Rock |
| **Best Screenplay**: **Johnny Mak and Stephen Shiu — To Be Number One**‡; Lee Chi Ngai — This Thing Called Love; Chan Man-keung — Lee Rock; Barry Wong and Lee Chi Ngai — Alan and Eric: Between Hello and Goodbye; Barry Wong and Gordon Chan — Fight Back to School | **Best Actor**: **Eric Tsang — Alan and Eric: Between Hello and Goodbye**‡; Ray Lui — To Be Number One; Stephen Chow — Fight Back to School; Chow Yun-fat — Once a Thief; Andy Lau — Lee Rock |
| **Best Actress**: **Cecilia Yip — This Thing Called Love**‡; Cheung Man — Dances with Dragon; Anita Mui — Au Revoir Mon Amour; Carol Cheng — Her Fatal Ways 2; Carina Lau — Gigolo and Whore | **Best Supporting Actor**: **Kwan Hoi-san — Lee Rock**‡; Ng Man Tat — Fight Back to School; Aaron Kwok — Saviour of the Soul; Jacky Cheung — Once Upon a Time in China; Kent Tong — The Tigers; Kent Cheng — To Be Number One |
| **Best Supporting Actress**: **Deanie Ip — Dances with Dragon**‡; Carrie Ng — Au Revoir Mon Amour; Chingmy Yau — Lee Rock; Cecilia Yip — To Be Number One; Rosamund Kwan — This Thing Called Love | **Best New Performer**: **Jade Leung — Black Cat**‡; Jackie Lui — Dreams of Glory: A Boxer's Story; Chan Tak Hing — Dreams of Glory: A Boxer's Story; Sonny Song — Fruit Punch |
| **Best Film Editing**: **Marco Mak — Once Upon a Time in China**‡; David Wu — Once a Thief; Marco Mak — A Chinese Ghost Story III; Poon Hung — To Be Number One; Poon Hung and Hai Kit-wai — Saviour of the Soul | **Best Cinematography**: **Peter Pau — Saviour of the Soul**‡; Gigo Lee and Andrew Lau — Lee Rock; Bill Wong, David Chung, Peter Pau and Peter Ngor — Au Revoir Mon Amour; Peter Pau —Bury Me High; David Chung, Bill Wong, Arthur Wong, Ardy Lam, Chan Tung Chuen and Wilson Chan — Once Upon a Time in China |
| **Best Art Direction**: **Yee Chung-Man — Saviour of the Soul**‡; Yee Chung-Man — Once Upon a Time in China; Eddie Ma — Au Revoir Mon Amour; Jason Mok — Lee Rock; Ben Luk — Alan and Eric: Between Hello and Goodbye; James Leung and William Chang Suk Ping — A Chinese Ghost Story III | **Best Action Direction**: **Yuen Cheung-yan, Yuen Shun-yee** **and Lau Kar-wing — Once Upon a Time in China**‡; Yuen Tak — Saviour of the Soul; Jackie Chan Stunt Team — Armour of God II: Operation Condor; Lam Moon Wah — Prison on Fire 2; Tony Ching, Yuen Bun, Ma Yuk Sing and Cheung Yiu Sing — A Chinese Ghost Story III |
| **Best Original Film Score**: **Wong Jim — Once Upon a Time in China**‡; Eugene Pao — This Thing Called Love; Jonathan Lee, Ken Shima — Sisters of the World Unite; Anthony Lun, Terry Chan — Au Revoir Mon Amour; Chris Babida — Bury Me High; Romeo Diaz and Wong Jim — A Chinese Ghost Story III | **Best Original Film Song**: **Composer: Lo Ta-yu • Lyrics: Albert Leung • Singer: Anita Mui** **— Twin Bracelets**‡; Composer: Wu Wai Lap • Lyrics: Leung Mei Wai • Singer: Andy Lau — Casino Raiders II; Composer: Anthony Lun • Lyrics: Wong Jim • Singer: Anita Mui — Au Revoir Mon Amour; Composer: Jonathan Lee • Lyrics: Lam Chun Keung • Singer: Sally Yeh — Sisters of the World Unite; Composer: Lowell Lo • Lyrics: Leung Mei Wa • Singer: Cally Kwong — Dances with Dragon |
**Professional Achievement**: **Tu Haiqing and Barry Wong**‡
