= Hung Yan-yan =

- Born: 25 February 1962 (age 64); Liuzhou, Guangxi, China
- Occupations: Actor; stunts director; stuntman
- Years active: 1982–present
- Spouse: Carrie Choy
- Children: 1

Chinese name
Transcriptions
Standard Mandarin
- Hanyu Pinyin: Xióng Xīnxīn
Yue: Cantonese
- Jyutping: Hung4 Jan1jan1
- Musical career
- Also known as: Xiong Xinxin

Hung Yan-yan (born 25 February 1962, also credited as 熊欣欣 or Xiong Xin Xin) is a Hong Kong martial artist, actor, stuntman and action director originally from Liuzhou, Guangxi, China. He was the stunt double for martial arts superstar Jet Li.

== Early life ==
Hung was born in Liuzhou, Guangxi, China in 1962. He was placed in a martial arts school at age 12 after he was taken away from school. Hung trained for 12 years and won multiple championships.

== Film career ==
After training, he went to Hong Kong and was discovered by famous filmmaker Lau Kar-leung, who was at that time filming Martial Arts of Shaolin starring Jet Li, and hired Hung as Li's stunt double. He then moved to Hong Kong in 1988. There, Hung became a stuntman, later an actor and action director. He had small roles as an actor.

Later, Hung was Jet Li's stunt double in Once Upon a Time in China. Some of the action scenes were too dangerous for Li because of an ankle injury. Hung was then Li's stunt double again in the sequel, Once Upon a Time in China II. He was also featured a role as the leader of the White Lotus Sect, Kau-kung "Priest" Gao.

He featured in Once Upon a Time in China III as Kwai Geuk-Chat known as "Clubfoot Seven" Chiu-Tsat. He was so nicknamed due to his disability, being the seventh member of wealthy rival martial artist, Chiu Tin-bak's gang. A fighting enforcer, he fights Wong Fei-hung (Li), loses and is terribly injured after Leung Foon (Max Mok) accidentally releases a stampede of horses from a stable. Clubfoot Seven is then kicked out and abandoned by his former master, Chiu Tin-bak when he called his student Clubfoot a "useless cripple", and becomes discipled to Wong instead. Despite his clubfoot, he showcases his skills which includes his electrifying acrobats and moves. Hung reprised his role as Clubfoot in the next two sequels which do not feature Li, instead it featured Vincent Zhao, who was much younger than Li and more physical so Hung was not much featured as a stunt double. He reprised his role again in the Once Upon a Time in China TV series and in Once Upon a Time in China and America which again features Jet Li and is the last of the Once Upon a Time in China series.

He was the main villain, Prince Twelve, in Yuen Wo Ping's Hero Among Heroes starring Donnie Yen. His role was first a friend of Yen's character, who turns him into a drug addict and later betrays him.

Hung also followed Tsui Hark to Hollywood in 1998, making a brief performance in Double Team.

After working briefly in Hollywood, he returned to Hong Kong. Hung was action director in Chin Siu-tung's Blacksheep Affair and again in Tsui Hark's 2000 film, Time and Tide starring Nicholas Tse.

He later returned to Hollywood as stunt choreographer for The Musketeer.

== Personal life ==
Hung is married to Carrie Choy, a former actress, and they have one child. He learned English by reading books.

== Filmography ==
=== Actor ===
- Shaolin Temple (1982) – Shaolin student
- Kids From Shaolin (1984) – Shaolin student
- Martial Arts of Shaolin (1986) – Shaolin student
- Tiger on the Beat (1988) – extra/stuntman
- City Cops (1989) – Shikamuka's thug
- Ghost Ballroom (1989) – Mr Lo's thug
- Aces Go Places V (1989) – Thai horse rider
- God of Gamblers (1989) – Shing's man
- Stage Door Johnny (1990) – troublemaker at restaurant
- Tiger on the Beat 2 (1990)
- Skinny Tiger and Fatty Dragon (1990) – Robber
- Bullet for Hire (1991) – extra
- Lee Rock II (1991) – Shrimp Head / Lu
- Once Upon a Time in China (1991) – Shaho gang member
- Once Upon a Time in China II (1992) – Kau-kung (Priest Gao)
- Royal Tramp (1992) – flag holder
- The Musical Vampire (1992)
- Forced Nightmare (1992)
- New Dragon Gate Inn (1992)
- Once Upon a Time in China III (1993) – Kwai Geuk-Chat (Clubfoot Seven Chiu-Tsat)
- Hero Among Heroes (1993) – Prince Barac of Twelve
- Millionaire Cop (1993) – Robber
- Once Upon a Time in China IV (1993) – Kwai Geuk-Chat (Clubfoot Seven Chiu-Tsat)
- To Live and Die in Tsimshatsui (1994) – Bald rascal
- The Other Side of the Sea (1994)
- Once Upon a Time in China V (1994) – Kwai Geuk-Chat (Clubfoot Seven Chiu-Tsat)
- Wonder Seven (1994) – Shaolin Monk
- The Chinese Feast (1995) – Chef Wong Wing
- The Blade (1995) – Fei Lung / Flying Dragon (Falcon)
- The Little Drunken Masters (1995)
- Fist of Fury (1995)
- Wong Fei Hung Series (1996) – Kwai Geuk-Chat (Clubfoot Seven Chiu-Tsat)
- Tristar (1996) – Loanshark Tai
- Black Mask (1996) – Jimmy
- Once Upon a Time in China and America (1997) – Kwai Geuk-Chat (Clubfoot Seven Chiu-Tsat)
- Double Team (1997) - Stavros' Man in hotel
- Till Death Do Us Part (1998)- Bill
- The Blacksheep Affair (1998) – Captain Kiang
- Star Runner (2003) – Spectator irritating Prof. Cheung
- In the Blue (2006)
- Playboy Cops (2008) – Scorpion Yong
- The Butterfly Lovers (2008) – Martial Arts Teacher
- Coweb (2009) – Brief Appearance, Club Manager
- Vampire Warriors (2010)
- Bad Blood (2010) – Kong
- Shaolin (2011) – Sou Xiang Tu
- All Men Are Brothers (2011) – Luan Tingyu
- The Woman Knight of Mirror Lake (2011)
- Tai Chi 0 (2012)
- Tai Chi Hero (2012)
- Glory Days (2012)
- Ip Man: The Final Fight (2013)
- The Master (2015)
- Trivisa (2016)
- The Hidden Sword (2017)
- Our Time Will Come (2017)
- Fate Crisis (2018)
- Kung Fu League (2018)
- Swordsman Nice Kung Fu (2019)
- Assassins and the Missing Gold (2019)

=== Stuntman ===
- Once Upon a Time in China III (1993)
- Once Upon a Time in China (1992)
- Once Upon a Time in China (1991)
- Tiger Cage 2 (1990)
- Tiger On the Beat 2 (1990)
- City Cops (1989)
- Tiger On The Beat (1988)
- Yellow River Fighter (1988)

=== Action director ===
- Tiger on the Beat 2 (1990)
- Skinny Tiger, Fatty Dragon (1990)
- Wonder Seven (1994)
- Tristar (1996)
- ...Till Death Do Us Part (1998)
- Time and Tide (2000)
- Reunion (2002)
- Seven Swords (2005)
- In the Blue (2006)
- Coweb (2009)

=== Assistant action director ===
- Aces Go Places V (1989)
- Once Upon a Time in China (1991)
- Dragon Inn (1992)
- Once Upon a Time in China IV (1993)
- Once Upon a Time in China and America (1997)
- The Blacksheep Affair (1998)

=== Director ===
- Coweb (2009)

=== Executive producer ===
- Into the Blue (2006)
