= Wong Fei Hung Series =

- 黃飛鴻新傳
- Genre: Martial arts
- Based on: Once Upon a Time in China
- Written by: Tsui Hark; Daniel Lee; Lam Kei-to; Chung Ngoi-fong; Cheng Pik-yin; Tang Pik-yin
- Directed by: Tsui Hark; Daniel Lee; Si Mei-yi; Mak Dong-kit
- Starring: Vincent Zhao; Maggie Shiu; Max Mok; Lau Shun; Kent Cheng; Hung Yan-yan; Power Chan; Cheung Chun-hung
- Opening theme: "A Man Should Better Himself" (男兒當自強)
- Country of origin: Hong Kong
- Original language: Cantonese
- No. of episodes: 20

Production
- Producer: Tsui Hark
- Production location: Hong Kong
- Cinematography: Ko Chiu-lam; Ng Wai-kin; Yeung Gwo-leung; Chow Kwan-sing
- Production company: Film Workshop

Original release
- Network: ATV; TVB; Indosiar
- Release: 1995 – 1996

Related
- Once Upon a Time in China (film series)

The Wong Fei Hung Series (黃飛鴻新傳) is a 1995–1996 Hong Kong martial arts television film series of five stories about Wong Fei-hung (Huang Feihong), a Chinese martial artist and folk hero, each told in four episodes. It is a spin-off of the Once Upon a Time in China film series, which is known in Chinese as Wong Fei-hung.

The series was produced by Tsui Hark and stars Vincent Zhao in the titular role and Maggie Shiu as his love interest "13th Aunt" Siu-kwan, along with Max Mok, Lau Shun, Kent Cheng, Hung Yan-yan, Power Chan and Cheung Chun-hung.

== Plot ==
=== The Eight Assassins (八大天王) ===
The story is set in the late Qing dynasty. Empress Dowager Cixi sends Prince Cheng to Foshan to recruit Wong Fei-hung to serve the government but Wong declines. In anger, Prince Cheng secretly gathers a group of eight notorious assassins – the "Eight Great Heavenly Kings", led by Monk Geng-fa – to deal with Wong. While Wong is seeing 13th Aunt off at the dock, the eight assassins attack his clinic, Po-chi-lam, and injure his students and rob his ancestral tablets. They threaten to destroy the tablets unless Wong fights them in a leitai match.

Wong wins three rounds in the match but collapses after the third round as he has been poisoned. Wong's students take his place in the next rounds and marginally win the match. Wong is on the verge of death from poisoning, but, surprisingly, Monk Geng-fa sends him the antidote.

Just before the final fight takes place, Wong rings the temple's bells and reminds Monk Geng-fa of his past. Actually, Monk Geng-fa used to be a Shaolin monk but was expelled from the monastery for bad conduct. He decides to repent and gives up fighting. Prince Cheng also feels ashamed of himself and lets Wong off. Wong returns the ancestral tablets to Po-chi-lam while 13th Aunt returns from her trip to Europe.

=== The Suspicious Temple (少林故事) ===
Hung-chi, the Shaolin abbot, has contracted a serious illness. Wong Fei-hung is invited to help to heal the abbot. He brings his students Porky Wing and Clubfoot with him to Shaolin and discovers that Hung-chi has been poisoned. Just as he is about to heal the abbot, a masked assailant attempts to assassinate the abbot but fails and escapes. Wong pursues the assassin to the Shaolin library, where the latter mysteriously disappears.

After an investigation, Wong learns that some Shaolin monks, led by Mo-gan, have studied abroad in Europe before. They are very dissatisfied with the temple's rules, so they attempted to assassinate the abbot and reform Shaolin. Wong succeeds in persuading Mo-gan and his followers to give up on their radical plan and convey their ideas to the abbot through peaceful dialogue. However, Shaolin's discipline master, Ho-gam, refuses to let them see the abbot and has them arrested and sent to perform hard labour. Clubfoot is captured during the chaos and brought to the labour camp.

Clubfoot escapes and rescues an old monk, Hung-wun, with Mo-gan and Kwai-so's help. Wong discovers that Hung-wun's limbs were injured by someone who uses the "Great Strength Vajra Finger", and decides to do a blood transfusion between Hung-chi and Hung-wun. The operation is successful and the two monks recover. Hung-wun is still crippled but can now use his "Iron Head Skill" again.

Wong bids Hung-chi farewell and returns to Po-chi-lam but Hung-chi insists that he remains for a contest over three days. Wong encounters danger during the third round but manages to escape with Mo-gan, Hung-wun and his students. They are blocked by Shaolin's Eighteen Arhats and Four Prajnas but Wong's father, Wong Kei-ying, appears and saves them. They discover that Hung-chi is actually the mastermind behind a plot to seize the position of abbot. He injured Hung-wun with the "Great Strength Vajra Finger" and imprisoned him in a labour camp. Hung-chi flees after his evil plan is exposed.

Shaolin, now without an abbot, is about to turn chaotic. Eventually, Ho-gam suggests that Wong Fei-hung become the new abbot but Wong Kei-ying is chosen eventually. Wong Kei-ying accepts suggestions from Mo-gan and his followers and reforms Shaolin. He also invites 13th Aunt to help him. Wong Fei-hung sees that now things are back in order, so he bids his father farewell and returns to Foshan. On the way back, he encounters Hung-chi and fights with him. Hung-chi dies and Wong and his companions return to Po-chi-lam safely.

=== The Headless General (無頭將軍) ===
A legend in Canton says of a haunted plum orchid in the western part of the city. General Cheung visits Canton and insists on visiting the haunted orchid. Canton's Governor Hong is afraid that something might happen to the general, so he asks Wong Fei-hung's students to help to protect the general.

One night, the general is assassinated, loses his head, and becomes a "Headless General". The general's subordinate, Lau, orders everyone in Po-chi-lam to be detained. He threatens Governor Hong to find the general's missing head in seven days, or he will summon General Cheung's sworn brother, General Hon, to enter Canton and hunt down the murderer. Yee-long, a Taoist priest who has a past feud with Wong, uses the opportunity to fabricate stories and claims that Wong and his students are responsible for the hauntings. This causes much fear and panic in the city.

To uncover the truth, Wong ventures into the orchid and finds some clues. With assistance from Nip Siu-sin, a mysterious lady, Wong tricks Lau into revealing himself to be the murderer, and that the mastermind is actually General Hon. After his lies are exposed, the furious General Hon attacks the city but his plan is foiled and Wong saves the day.

=== The Final Victory (辛亥革命) ===
This story is set in the period after the Huanghuagang Uprising. Wong Fei-hung travels to Canton with 13th Aunt and students Leung Foon, Clubfoot, Kai and "Bucktooth" So. He sets up a branch for his Po-chi-lam clinic in an inn. He is drawn into the conflict between the Qing government and the Tongmenghui, a revolutionary movement aiming to overthrow the Qing dynasty and establish a republic in China. Beggar So, Wong Kei-ying's junior, is wanted by the Qing government for helping the Tongmenghui.

Wong finds himself in a precarious situation. On one hand, he has to deal with pressures from Canton's governor, who suspects he has been helping the revolutionaries. On the other hand, Wong secretly helps the revolutionaries and pretends he has nothing to do with them. The revolutionaries' missions are undermined by counter-espionage activities by secret agents working for the Qing government. These agents have been impersonating revolutionaries and luring the real revolutionaries and their supporters into traps, where they are killed or captured. Wong is initially reluctant to join the Tongmenghui, but has no choice because his companions are already part of the revolutionary movement.

At one point, Wong feigns death to put the governor off guard, and then disguises himself and infiltrates the secret agents' base. With his help, the revolutionaries successfully attack and destroy the base. The governor sends his soldiers to burn down Po-chi-lam and kill everyone inside but fails. Wong goes to the coast to distract the soldiers and buy time for Beggar So and the revolutionaries to escape by sea. He succeeds, but is captured and sentenced to death by the governor. Wong's students storm the execution ground and manage to rescue their master and escape together. However, they are eventually surrounded and cornered at gunpoint by the governor and his soldiers. Just as they are about to be shot, a messenger shows up and informs the governor that the Wuchang Uprising has taken place. The governor is stunned and does not know what to do. Wong and his companions hug each other in joy.

=== The Ideal Century (理想年代) ===
The Qing dynasty has been overthrown by the 1911 Xinhai Revolution. Wong Fei-hung and his students return from their trip to Japan. Along the way, Wong meets a reporter, Ng Mung-ching, who was a fellow student of 13th Aunt, and starts a romance with her.

Ng introduces Wong to help Chai Kei, a close associate of Yuan Shikai, with printing banknotes. Wong also breaks up a banknote agency controlled by Westerners with Ng's help. Po-chi-lam is recognised by the government as a legitimate banknote printing and distribution organisation.

13th Aunt is jealous of Wong and Ng. At the same time, Chai Kei also displays affections for her. 13th Aunt unexpectedly discovers that Ng is a descendant of the Qing imperial family and she is planning to make use of Yuan Shikai to help her restore the Qing dynasty. In the meantime, Wong learns that Ng has been lying to them: she is using the banknotes from Po-chi-lam to purchase firearms instead of food and medical supplies.

Wong and his companions confront Chai and Ng to put an end to their plans.

== Cast ==
=== Main cast ===
- Vincent Zhao as Wong Fei-hung
- Maggie Shiu as Yee Siu-kwan ("13th Aunt")
- Max Mok as Leung Foon
- Lau Shun as Wong Kei-ying
- Kent Cheng as Lam Sai-wing ("Porky Wing")
- Hung Yan-yan as Kwai Geuk-chat ("Clubfoot Seven Chiu-Tsat")
- Power Chan as So Sai-man ("Bucktooth" So)
- Cheung Chun-hung as Ling Wun-kai ("Kai")

=== Other cast ===
- Jacqueline Law as Aunt Ying
- Toi Bo
- Derek Yee
- Pak Chin-shek
- Yuen Bun
- Choi King-sing
- Lam Man
- Man Shing
- Hung Chi-sing
- Yeung Sai-kuen
- Kwan Yung
- Chan Kin-yat
- Lam Wun-fung
- Elvis Tsui
- Wan Yeung-ming
- James Pax
- Lau Kar-wing
- Bryan Leung
- Cheng Pei-pei as Beggar So
- Hugo Ng as Man Hing-long
- Ng Yiu-li
- Lam Pooi-yee
- Elaine Ng
