= Once Upon a Time in China (film series) =

Hong Kong action film series

Once Upon a Time in China film series
- Once Upon a Time in China DVD box set for the first three films
- Traditional Chinese: 武狀元黃飛鴻
- Simplified Chinese: 武状元黄飞鸿
- Hanyu Pinyin: Wǔ Zhuàngyuán Huáng Fēihǒng Xì Liè
- Jyutping: Mou5 Zong6 Jyun4 Wong4 Fei1 Hung4 Hai6 Lit6
- Directed by: Tsui Hark (I, II, III, V); Yuen Bun (IV); Sammo Hung (VI)
- Written by: Tsui Hark; Leung Yiu Ming (I); Elsa Tang Pik Yin (I, IV); Yun Kai Chi (I); Chan Tin-suen (II, III); Cheung Tan (II, III)
- Produced by: Tsui Hark; Raymond Chow (II); Ng See-Yuen (II-V); Dick Tso (VI)
- Starring: Jet Li (I-III, VI); Vincent Zhao (IV-V)
- Cinematography: Chan Tung-Chuen; Wilson Chan; David Chung; Andy Lam; Arthur Wong; Bill Wong; Andrew Lau; Sammo Hung
- Edited by: Marco Mak; Angie Lam
- Music by: James Wong; Romeo Díaz; Richard Yuen; Johnny Njo; Wu Wai Lap; Lowell Lo
- Production companies: Golden Harvest; Film Workshop
- Distributed by: Orange Sky Golden Harvest; China Star Entertainment; Win's Entertainment; Fortune Star Media Limited (I, II, III & VI only, current); Warner Bros. Pictures (IV & V only, current)
- Running time: 657 minutes
- Country: Hong Kong
- Languages: Cantonese (I-VI); Mandarin (I-VI); English (I-VI); French (I); Russian (III); German (IV)

Once Upon a Time in China is a Hong Kong film and television franchise created and produced by Tsui Hark, consisting of six films and a television series released between 1991 and 1997. Tsui also directed four of the films and co-wrote the first five as well as an episode of the television series.

The films and the series recount fictional exploits and adventures of real-life Chinese martial arts master and folk hero of Cantonese ethnicity Wong Fei-hung, who is portrayed by Jet Li in the first through third and sixth films and Vincent Zhao in the fourth and fifth films and the TV series, his apprentices Leung Foon, Kwai Geuk-Chat and Lam Sai-wing, and his love interest Siu-kwan, a fictional character created for the series and played by Rosamund Kwan in the films and Maggie Shiu on television.

The first two films in the franchise were among the most popular of the Golden Age of Hong Kong cinema (usually dated from 1986 to 1993) and were known for their depiction of Chinese nationalism as well as action choreography. The Once Upon a Time in China films were among Jet Li's best known hits at that time.

== Overview ==
With Chinese folk hero of Cantonese ethnicity, Wong Fei-hung, as the main character, the films deal with the positive and negative effects of Western imperialism in China during the late Qing Dynasty. The second film features as a supporting character Sun Yat-sen, a revolutionary leader and founding father of the Chinese republic. Unlike the majority of Hong Kong action films, the Once Upon a Time in China series is clearly politicized. However, even with its clear showcase of Chinese nationalism, it also displays the inevitable nature of accepting western cultures, and the progression of China into the "modern" century. This theme is repeated through various actions of the characters, but prominently displayed through the character Master Yim, a Kung-Fu master who appears in the first film. Once, he boasted that his Kung-Fu could even withstand bullets, yet he is killed with them. His last words, said to Wong Fei-Hung, are "Martial arts cannot win against guns..." His character represents the dying of old traditions, and the begrudging abandonment of hand-to-hand combat.

== Media ==
Title	HK release date	Director(s)	Screenwriter(s)	Producer(s)
Once Upon a Time in China (黃飛鴻)	15 August 1991	Tsui Hark	Tsui Hark, Yuen Kai-chi, Leung Yiu-ming (梁耀明) & Elsa Tang Pik-yin (鄧碧燕)	Tsui Hark
Once Upon a Time in China II (黃飛鴻之二男兒當自強)	16 April 1992	Tsui Hark	Tsui Hark, Chan Tin-suen & Cheung Tan	Tsui Hark, Ng See-yuen & Raymond Chow
Once Upon a Time in China III (黃飛鴻之三獅王爭霸)	11 February 1993 (Note: Released earlier in Taiwan in December 1992)	Tsui Hark	Tsui Hark, Chan Tin-suen & Cheung Tan	Tsui Hark & Ng See-yuen
Once Upon a Time in China IV (黃飛鴻之四王者之風)	10 June 1993	Yuen Bun	Tsui Hark & Elsa Tang Pik-yin	Tsui Hark & Ng See-yuen
Once Upon a Time in China V (黃飛鴻之五龍城殲霸)	17 November 1994	Tsui Hark	Tsui Hark, Lau Daai-muk & Jason Lam Kee-to	Tsui Hark & Ng See-yuen
TV series (黃飛鴻新傳)	1995-1996	Daniel Lee, Choi Ching Shing, Michael Mak, Zheng Jicheng & Hu Mingkai	Daniel Lee, Jason Lam Kee-to, Zhong Aifang, Elsa Tang Pik-yin, Choi Ching Shing, Leung Yiu-ming, Michael Mak, Tsui Hark, Zheng Jicheng & Hu Mingkai	Tsui Hark
Once Upon a Time in China and America (黃飛鴻之西域雄獅)	1 February 1997	Sammo Hung & Lau Kar-wing	Sze-to Cheuk-hon, Shut Mei-yee, Sharon Hui, Philip Kwok & So Man-sing	Tsui Hark

== Music ==
- The theme song of the Once Upon a Time in China series is based on the Ming Dynasty folk song "Under the General's Orders" (將軍令); the version used in the films is titled "A Man of Determination" (男兒當自強) and was written by James Wong Jim.
- The Cantonese version of the theme song is sung by George Lam and the Mandarin version is performed by Jackie Chan.
- The theme song has long been associated with the Wong Fei-hung legend, appearing in some form in many early films about him. It was used in the 1978 film Drunken Master, starring Jackie Chan, which also had Wong Fei-hung as the main character. It also was notably used in the 1983 film Winners and Sinners, starring Sammo Hung. It was played in a market scene whilst the Five Lucky Stars are watching two men demonstrating the beneficial effects of their medicines and their martial arts stances, obviously in reference to Wong Fei-hung.
- The theme song was also sampled by Ninja Tune artist Quincy for a track titled "Bruce Lee MC", which can be found on the Xen Cuts compilation album. The track also contains samples of Bruce Lee's fight vocalizations.

== Cast ==
Character		Film						
Name	Nickname	I	II	III	IV	V	TV series	China & America
Wong Fei-hung		Jet Li	Jet Li	Jet Li	Vincent Zhao	Vincent Zhao	Vincent Zhao	Jet Li
Siu-kwan	"13th Aunt"	Rosamund Kwan	Rosamund Kwan	Rosamund Kwan		Rosamund Kwan	Maggie Shiu	Rosamund Kwan
Leung Foon		Yuen Biao	Max Mok	Max Mok	Max Mok	Max Mok	Max Mok	
Kwai Geuk-Chat	"Clubfoot Seven Chiu-Tsat"			Hung Yan-yan	Hung Yan-yan	Hung Yan-yan	Hung Yan-yan	Hung Yan-yan
Lam Sai-wing	"Porky Wing"	Kent Cheng				Kent Cheng	Kent Cheng	
So Sai-man	"Bucktooth So"	Jacky Cheung				Roger Kwok	Power Chan	Power Chan
Aunt May	"14th Aunt"				Jean Wang	Jean Wang		
Wong Kei-ying				Lau Shun	Lau Shun	Lau Shun	Lau Shun	

== Home media ==
In addition to the various individual DVD releases, the first three films in the series have been released in a number of collection box sets.

- On 17 July 2001, Columbia Tri-Star / Sony released the films in the US in a two-disc box set, with the second disc being double-sided, containing Once Upon a Time in China II on one side and Once Upon a Time in China III on the other. In creating the discs, Colombia took a non-anamorphic master and interpolated it to make it anamorphic. The films in this release feature Cantonese and Mandarin soundtracks, with English, Spanish and French subtitle options.
- Columbia Tri-Star later re-released the "trilogy" in a three disc version of the box set.
- On 7 April 2003, the films were released by Hong Kong Legends. This release contained extras including interviews. The first film featured an audio commentary by Bey Logan and Mark King. The second and third films featured commentaries by Logan on his own. The films are presented in their original aspect ratio of 2.35:1, with Cantonese audio and English subtitles, as well as English dub tracks.
- In 2004, the trilogy was released in remastered version in Hong Kong by Joy Sales / Fortune Star's under their "Legendary Collection" banner.
- Hong Kong-based company Kam & Ronson Enterprise have announced that they will release the first three films on Blu-ray Disc in June 2009. The first film was released on 18 September 2009.
- In November 2021, The Criterion Collection (under licensed from Warner Bros. Home Entertainment / Studio Distribution Services, LLC & Fortune Star Media Limited) released a box set featuring all of the films.

== Imitators ==
As imitation was relatively common in the Hong Kong film industry, Once Upon a Time in China quickly gained mimics. Whilst these films also focused on Wong Fei-hung, they were not part of the series, and had different cast members and directors. They include:

- Kick Boxer, directed by Wu Ma and starring Yuen Biao as Lau Chat. In some releases this had the alternative titles Once Upon a Chinese Hero and Once Upon a Time in China 6: Kickboxer.
- Once Upon a Time a Hero in China, directed by Lee Lik-chi and starring Alan Tam, Eric Tsang and Simon Yam.
- Once Upon a Time a Hero in China II, a sequel to Once Upon a Time a Hero in China, directed by Lee Lik-chi and starring Alan Tam and Eric Tsang.
- Great Hero from China, directed by Hwang Jang-lee and starring Chin Kar-lok and Lam Ching Ying.

However, one imitator had more direct links with the original series, Last Hero in China (黃飛鴻之鐵雞鬥蜈蚣). This film was released in 1993 after the original Once Upon a Time in China trilogy. It is derivative of these films, and unlike other imitation films, it can be considered a spin-off or parody to some extent. It was directed by Wong Jing in place of Tsui Hark. The film's action director was Yuen Woo-ping and once again it starred Jet Li as Wong Fei-hung. However, it differs greatly in tone from the Once Upon a Time in China series, containing stronger elements of violence and broader slapstick comedy.
