= Once Upon a Time in China IV =

1993 Hong Kong film by Yuen Bun

- Theatrical release poster

Chinese name
- Traditional Chinese: 黃飛鴻之四王者之風
- Simplified Chinese: 黄飞鸿之四王者之风
Transcriptions
Standard Mandarin
- Hanyu Pinyin: Huáng Fēihǒng Zhī Sì Wáng Zhě Zhī Fēng
Yue: Cantonese
- Jyutping: Wong4 Fei1-hung4 Zi1 Sei3 Wong4 Ze2 Zi1 Fung1
- Directed by: Yuen Bun
- Written by: Tsui Hark; Tang Pik-yin
- Produced by: Tsui Hark; Ng See-yuen
- Starring: Vincent Zhao; Jean Wang; Max Mok; Hung Yan-yan
- Cinematography: Arthur Wong; Ko Chiu-lam; Chow Man-keung; Cheung Man-po
- Edited by: Marco Mak
- Music by: William Wu Wai-lap
- Production companies: Golden Harvest; Paragon Films Ltd. Film Workshop
- Distributed by: Golden Harvest; Gala Film Distribution Ltd. Warner Bros. Pictures
- Release date: 10 June 1993
- Running time: 101 minutes
- Countries: Hong Kong; China
- Languages: Cantonese; Mandarin; English; German
- Box office: HK$11,301,790.00

Once Upon a Time in China IV is a 1993 Hong Kong martial arts film, the fourth installment in the Once Upon a Time in China film series. It is the first not to star Jet Li as Wong Fei-hung, with the main role instead played by Vincent Zhao. Tsui Hark was succeeded as director by the previous film's martial arts choreographer Yuen Bun, in his directorial debut, while remaining attached as writer and producer.

== Plot ==
In Beijing, China in 1900 during the Qing dynasty, Wong Fei-hung plans to return to Foshan with his father Wong Kei-ying and apprentices Leung Foon and Clubfoot. He also meets 14th Aunt, 13th Aunt's sister, who has a romantic crush on him.

Just as Wong is about to leave, a Manchu general, Alan Chengdu, shows up and tells him that the Eight-Nation Alliance has challenged China to an international lion dance competition. The general is eager to recruit Wong to join him in representing China in the competition because Wong was the champion of the national lion dance competition. Since the competition is an international one, the contestants are not restricted to using only lion masks; other animal masks, such as dragon, centipede and eagle, are also present. Wong understands the gravity of the situation – China must win to uphold its sovereignty and regain lost national pride - and promises Alan Chengdu that he will join the competition.

The Red Lantern Sect is a feminist and xenophobic cult; that goes around killing foreigners and destroying everything regarded as alien to Chinese culture. Its members are all female and are mainly armed with rope weapons, bows and ether-filled lanterns. When the cult attacks a German medical clinic, Wong intervenes and tries to stop them from killing the foreigners. German soldiers show up and capture Wong and Miao Sanniang, one of the cult members. A Catholic priest, Father Thomas, comes to Wong's aid and helps him and Miao escape from prison. In the meantime, the Red Lantern Sect's leader thinks that Wong has kidnapped Miao so she sends her followers to attack and capture Wong's companions. Wong goes to the cult's headquarters, fights his way through complex formations (with help from Miao) defeats the cult leader and saves his companions.

Wong is late for the lion dance competition because he was busy dealing with the Red Lantern Sect. Alan Chengdu and his dragon dance teams decide to start without Wong. The competition turns out to be a brutal massacre as the other contestants have not only equipped their animal masks with various deadly weapons, but are also resorting to dirty tricks to ensure victory. By the time Wong reaches the arena, it is already too late as Alan Chengdu has been killed by gunfire from a machine gun mounted on top of the stand where the champion's medal is.

After paying his respects at Alan Chengdu's funeral, Wong sends Clubfoot to issue a challenge to the German general who oversaw the competition and request for a rematch. The general agrees. That night, the Red Lantern Sect causes trouble again by attacking a church. Miao attempts to stop her fellow cult members from killing Father Thomas and 14th Aunt but ends up being killed by Iron Fist's accomplices. Wong shows up, defeats the cult members and rescues Father Thomas, 14th Aunt and other foreigners. At the same time, the cult leader fights with Clubfoot while Leung and his friends fight with the rest of her cult members until they are interrupted by German soldiers. Clubfoot, Leung and his friends escape and hide, while the cult leader is slain by the German general's henchmen, Iron Fist and the rapier-wielding Duen Tin-lui, by shooting her and cutting her head off.

The following day, Wong and his well-prepared lion dance teams enter the competition arena to pit themselves against the other contestants. Shortly after they emerge victorious, they receive news that the forces of the Eight-Nation Alliance have defeated Chinese forces and occupied Beijing. Wong is enraged and wants to kill the German general to avenge Alan Chengdu. He teams up with Clubfoot to defeat and kill Iron Fist and Duen, who try to stop them from killing the German general. However, the general manages to escape even though he is seriously injured. Wong realises that it would make no difference even if he killed the German general because he cannot reverse the situation in Beijing, so he returns to Foshan from Beijing by train with his companions.

== Cast ==
- Vincent Zhao as Wong Fei-hung
- Jean Wang as "14th Aunt" Siu-kwan
- Max Mok as Leung Foon
- Hung Yan-yan as "Clubfoot" Kwai Geuk-chat
- Lau Shun as Wong Kei-ying
- Billy Chow as Iron Fist
- Chin Kar-lok as Duen Tin-lui
- Wang Jinghua as Miao Sanniang
- Louis Roth as Father Thomas
- Chen Jiming as A'lan Chengdu
- Wang Zhiwen as A'lan Chengdu's deputy

== Box office ==
The absence of Jet Li and the reduced input of Tsui Hark heavily affected the film's box office earnings. However, these factors also allowed the film to be produced at a much lower budget. Despite many negative reviews, the film grossed HK$11,301,790, a return significant enough for the producers to go ahead with the next film in the franchise, Once Upon a Time in China V.
