= City Kids =

City Kids may refer to:

- "City Kids", the B-side to the song "Motorhead" by Motörhead
- City Kids (album), a 1983 album by Spyro Gyra
- CityKids, a 1993 television show
- City Kids 1989, a 1989 Hong Kong film directed by Poon Man-kit and starring Andy Lau
