= Thirteenth Aunt =

Siu-kwan
- Once Upon a Time in China character
- Created by: Tsui Hark
- Portrayed by: Rosamund Kwan (original); Teresa Mo; Sharon Kwok Sau-wan; Lin Yi-chen; Maggie Shiu; Flora Chan; Huang Ying; Jean wang (14th)

In-universe information
- Aliases: Diana (English name); Aunt Yee or Aunt Yi

Thirteenth Aunt
- Chinese: 十三姨
Transcriptions
Standard Mandarin
- Hanyu Pinyin: Shísān Yí
Yue: Cantonese
- Yale Romanization: Sap^{6}-saam^{1} Yi^{4}
- Jyutping: Sap^{6}-saam^{1} Ji^{4}

Thirteenth Aunt, Chinese given name Siu-kwan or Aunt Yee (少筠; "Siu-kwan", incorrectly translated in some subtitles as "Peony"), is a fictional character created by Hong Kong director Tsui Hark for his 1991 martial arts film Once Upon a Time in China. The character was first portrayed by Rosamund Kwan.

== Fictional history ==
Siu-kwan was the Western-educated aunt and love interest of the protagonist, Chinese folk hero Wong Fei-hung in the film Once Upon a Time in China. Wong Fei-hung respectfully calls Siu-kwan "Thirteenth Aunt", in accordance with Chinese traditions emphasizing generations and family status. In imperial China it was considered disrespectful to refer to Thirteenth Aunt as "Siu-kwan", despite her later insistence that Wong Fei-hung do so. Their romance is forbidden since they are considered relatives due to the fact that Siu-kwan's father was a blood brother of Wong's grandfather.

Siu-kwan later appeared with Kwan reprised her role in four Once Upon a Time in China sequels films: Tsui's Once Upon a Time in China II (1992), Once Upon a Time in China III (1993), Once Upon a Time in China V (1994) and Sammo Hung's Once Upon a Time in China and America (1997). As a result of these films Siu-kwan became linked with the Wong Fei-hung legends, and was played by other actresses in later Wong Fei-hung media.

== Historical basis ==
Wong Fei-hung (1847–1924) had four spouses: Lady Lo (羅氏) (m. 1871), Lady Ma (馬氏) (m. 1896), Lady Sam (岑氏) (m. 1902) and Mok Kwai-lan (m. 1915, nominally a concubine). His first three wives died during their marriage to him. It is unlikely that Thirteenth Aunt was based on any of those wives; Siu-kwan's Chinese surname was not given in the film series, to avoid any association.

== Character overview and analysis ==
After Thirteenth Aunt was educated for three years in Great Britain, she returned to China with interests in photography and filmmaking and went into business. Palmer and Lau (2003) dismissed the notion that Thirteenth Aunt was merely a damsel in distress, calling her "ambiguous": "In many ways, Thirteenth Aunt is the female character most in tune with the actual position of women in Hong Kong." According to the authors, although Thirteenth Aunt receives a Western education, dresses in Western clothes and embraces Western technology she remains Chinese. She does not know any martial arts and defers to Wong in his company but is courageous and assertive, using her knowledge of steam engines and motion pictures to help preserve Chinese tradition (often in the face of foreign pressure). When some of these traditions prove repressive, as in her romance with Wong, she openly defies them. Palmer and Lau wrote, "Thirteenth Aunt negotiates the terrain between tradition and modernity without any sacrifices and she lives in a world of (male) violence without being either destroyed or co-opted by it".

== Other portrayals ==
- Teresa Mo in Once Upon a Time a Hero in China (1992 Hong Kong film) and Master Wong vs. Master Wong (1993 Hong Kong film)
- Jean Wang in Once Upon a Time in China IV (1993 Series) Roled as the 14th aunt.
- Sharon Kwok Sau-wan in Fist from Shaolin (1993 Hong Kong film)
- Lin Yi-chen in Wong Fei-hung and Thirteenth Aunt (1994 Taiwanese series)
- Maggie Shiu in Wong Fei Hung Series (1996 Hong Kong series)
- Flora Chan in Wong Fei-hung and Thirteenth Aunt (2005 Chinese series)
- Huang Ying in Da Hua Huang Feihong (2005 Chinese series)

== Other references ==
The 1999 arcade fighting game Martial Masters has a character, Saojin (サオジン), based on Thirteenth Aunt.

== Notes and references ==
=== Sources ===
- Palmer, Augusta Lee; Lau, Jenny Kwok Wah (2003). "Chapter 11. Of Executioners and Courtesans: The Performance of Gender in Hong Kong Cinema of the 1990s". In Lau (ed.). Multiple Modernities: Cinemas and Popular Media in Transcultural East Asia. Temple University Press. pp. 203–221. ISBN 1-56639-985-8.
