= Ge Cunzhuang =

Chinese actor

Ge Cunzhuang Chinese: 葛存壯) was a Chinese actor. He won the Golden Rooster Award for Best Supporting Actor in 1998, for Zhou Enlai, A Great Friend. On 4 March 2016, he died at the age of 87.

Ge You is his son.

== Selected filmography ==
- Once Upon a Time in China III (1993)
- Spicy Love Soup (1997)
- Waiting Alone (2004)
- Little Soldier Zhang Ga (2005)
- Call for Love (2007)
- The Founding of a Republic (2009)
