= Gigolo and Whore II =

1992 Hong Kong film by Andy Chin

- Directed by: Andy Chin
- Written by: Nga Naam; So Man-Sing
- Produced by: David Lam Tak Luk
- Starring: Simon Yam; Rosamund Kwan; Veronica Yip; Alex Fong; Jackie Lui; Jacqueline Ng; Kong Man-Sing; Lo Fan
- Release date: 12 March 1992 (Hong Kong)
- Running time: 90 minutes
- Country: Hong Kong
- Language: Cantonese
- Box office: HK$8,149,000 (Hong Kong)

Gigolo and Whore II (Chinese: 舞男情未了, Móuh nàahm chìhng meih líuh, The Dancer's Affection Is Not Yet Finished) is a 1992 Hong Kong film directed by Andy Chin and starring Simon Yam, Rosamund Kwan, Veronica Yip, Alex Fong, Jackie Lui, Jacqueline Ng, Kong Man-Sing and Lo Fan. It is a sequel to the 1991 film Gigolo and Whore.

== Plot ==
Sherin (Rosamund Kwan), a rich and beautiful lesbian has acquired the family business of Johnson (Alex Fong), Johnson then go to a gigolo bar and hire a gigolo in order to get his company back. The owner of the gigolo bar Jenny (Veronica Yip) recommends gigolo trainee Bill (Jackie Lui) to go for the mission, but Bill doesn't make it and fell in love with Sherin's girl friend (Jacqueline Ng). Bill's trainer Jack (Simon Yam), Hong Kong number one gigolo then accepts a HK$10 million offer from Johnson and starts to convert Sherin from her current sexual identity into a man-loving heterosexual. Nearly succeeds, Jack finds himself in love with Sherin...

== Cast and roles ==
- Simon Yam – Jack Cheung
- Rosamund Kwan – Sherin Chan
- Veronica Yip – Jenny
- Alex Fong – Johnson Lee
- Jackie Lui – Bill
- Jacqueline Ng – Ching
- Kong Man-Sing – Sherin's Dad
- Lo Fan – Bull Dyke

== Box office ==
The film grossed HK$8,149,000 at the Hong Kong box office during its theatrical run from 12 to 25 March 1992 in Hong Kong.
