= Film Workshop =

Hong Kong film production company and film distributor

Film Workshop Co. Ltd.
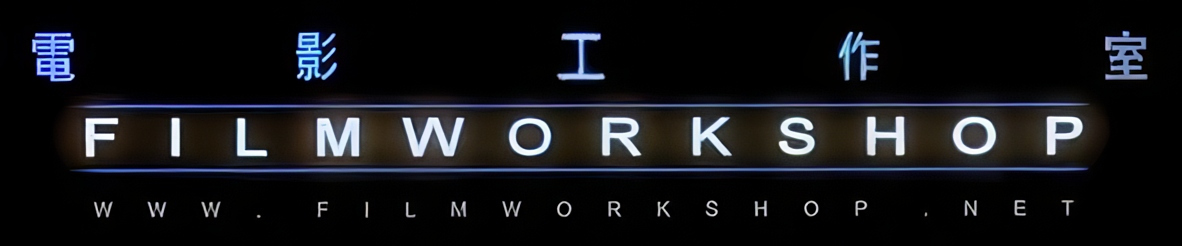
- Type: Production company
- Industry: Hong Kong cinema
- Founded: April 1984
- Headquarters: Kwun Tong, Hong Kong
- Key people: Tsui Hark; Nansun Shi

Film Workshop Co. Ltd. (simplified Chinese: 电影工作室; traditional Chinese: 電影工作室), is a Hong Kong film production company and film distributor. It was co-founded in April 1984 by Tsui Hark and Nansun Shi. Already a director with box office hits, Tsui wanted to create a workshop where the foremost filmmakers could work on films with artistic merit, and at the same time, films that could be commercially rewarding for the financiers behind his projects.

== Films ==
In 1984, Film Workshop's first film, Shanghai Blues, was a critical and commercial success in Hong Kong; as were the two subsequent films that Tsui directed: Working Class and Peking Opera Blues. At this time, Tsui invited other directors to join in. With Tsui producing, John Woo directed A Better Tomorrow, which grossed US$4.5 million locally to set a new record as the highest grossing motion picture in Hong Kong. After having a falling out during the making of A Better Tomorrow 2, they both split to produce their own films.

Film Workshop continues to produce the films that Tsui either produces or directs. This included films such as A Better Tomorrow 2, A Better Tomorrow 3, the Once Upon a Time in China film series and Seven Swords.

== Filmography ==
- 1984 Shanghai Blues (上海之夜)
- 1985 Working Class (打工皇帝)
- 1986 Peking Opera Blues (刀馬旦)
- 1986 A Better Tomorrow (英雄本色)
- 1987 A Better Tomorrow II (英雄本色II)
- 1987 A Chinese Ghost Story (倩女幽魂)
- 1989 The Killer (喋血雙雄)
- 1989 A Better Tomorrow III: Love & Death in Saigon (英雄本色3之夕陽之歌)
- 1990 Swordsman (笑傲江湖)
- 1990 A Chinese Ghost Story II (倩女幽魂II：人間道)
- 1991 A Chinese Ghost Story III (倩女幽魂III：道道道)
- 1991 Once Upon a Time in China (黃飛鴻)
- 1991 King of Chess (棋王)
- 1992 The Master (龍行天下)
- 1992 Once Upon a Time in China II (黃飛鴻之二男兒當自強)
- 1992 Swordsman II (笑傲江湖II東方不敗)
- 1992 New Dragon Gate Inn (新龍門客棧)
- 1993 The Magic Crane (新仙鶴神針)
- 1993 Once Upon a Time in China III (黃飛鴻之三獅王爭霸)
- 1993 Once Upon a Time in China IV (黃飛鴻之四王者之風)
- 1993 Green Snake (青蛇)
- 1994 The Lovers (梁祝)
- 1994 Once Upon a Time in China V (黃飛鴻之五龍城殲霸)
- 1995 Love in the Time of Twilight (花月佳期)
- 1995 The Chinese Feast (金玉滿堂)
- 1995 The Blade (刀)
- 1996 Tristar (大三元)
- 1996 Shanghai Grand (新上海灘)
- 1996 Black Mask (黑俠)
- 1997 Once Upon a Time in China VI (黃飛鴻之西域雄獅)
- 1997 Double Team (雙重火力)
- 1997 Knock Off (迎頭痛擊)
- 2000 Time and Tide (順流逆流)
- 2001 The Legend of Zu (蜀山傳)
- 2001 Black Mask 2: City of Masks (黑俠2)
- 2004 Seven Swords (七劍)
- 2007 Triangle (鐵三角)
- 2008 Missing (深海尋人)
- 2008 All About Women (女人不壞)
- 2010 Detective Dee and the Mystery of Phantom Flame (狄仁傑之通天帝國)
- 2011 Flying Swords of Dragon Gate (龍門飛甲)
- 2013 Young Detective Dee: Rise of the Sea Dragon (狄仁傑之神都龍王)
- 2017 The Thousand Faces of Dunjia (奇门遁甲)
- 2018 Detective Dee: The Four Heavenly Kings (狄仁傑之四大天王)
- 2025 The Legend of the Condor Heroes: The Great Hero (射鵰英雄傳: 俠之大者)
- 2025 Shih, Queen of the Sea
