= Once Upon a Time in China II =

1992 Hong Kong film by Tsui Hark

- Japanese film poster

Chinese name
- Traditional Chinese: 黃飛鴻之二男兒當自強
- Simplified Chinese: 黄飞鸿之二男儿当自强
Transcriptions
Standard Mandarin
- Hanyu Pinyin: Huáng Fēihǒng Zhī Èr Nánér Dāng Zìqiáng
Yue: Cantonese
- Jyutping: Wong4 Fei1-hung4 Zi1 Ji6 Naam4-ji4 Dong1 Zi6-koeng4
- Directed by: Tsui Hark
- Written by: Tsui Hark; Chan Tin-suen; Cheung Tan
- Produced by: Tsui Hark; Ng See-yuen
- Starring: Jet Li; Rosamund Kwan; Max Mok; Donnie Yen
- Cinematography: Arthur Wong
- Edited by: Marco Mak; Angie Lam; Andy Chan
- Music by: Richard Yuen; Johnny Yeung; Chow Gam-wing
- Production companies: Golden Harvest; Paragon Films Ltd. Film Workshop
- Distributed by: Golden Harvest
- Release date: 16 April 1992
- Running time: 113 minutes
- Country: Hong Kong
- Languages: Cantonese; Mandarin; English
- Box office: HK$30,399,676

Once Upon a Time in China II (Chinese: 黃飛鴻之二男兒當自強; lit. 'Wong Fei-Hung 2: A Man Should Better Himself') is a 1992 Hong Kong martial arts film directed, produced, and co-written by Tsui Hark. The second instalment in the Once Upon a Time in China film series, it stars Jet Li as Wong Fei-hung, along with Donnie Yen, Rosamund Kwan and Max Mok. Yuen Woo-ping was the film's martial arts choreographer. It was released by Golden Harvest on 16 April 1992.

== Plot ==
The film is set in China in 1895 during the Qing dynasty. Wong Fei-hung travels by train from Foshan to Canton to attend a seminar on medicine. He is accompanied by his romantic interest 13th Aunt and apprentice Leung Foon. The situation in Canton is rather chaotic. On one hand, there are protests in the streets against the signing of the Treaty of Shimonoseki. On the other hand, the White Lotus Sect, a xenophobic cult, goes around attacking Westerners and destroying everything regarded as alien to Chinese culture. At one point, 13th Aunt is almost captured by the cult when she tries to take a photo of them, but Wong shows up, fights with the cult members, and saves her.

Wong gives a lecture on acupuncture at the seminar while a Western-trained Chinese doctor, Sun Wen, helps him translate for the predominantly non-Chinese audience. The seminar is disrupted when the White Lotus Sect shoot flaming arrows into the building; Wong, Leung and Sun manage to escape safely. Wong feels that Canton is not safe and wants to bring Leung and 13th Aunt with him back to Foshan. However, just as they are about to leave, they learn that the White Lotus Sect is attacking the Tongwen Guan, a school for Chinese children to study foreign languages. They head over and save the children. The innkeeper refuses to allow the children to remain in his inn because he is worried that the White Lotus Sect will find trouble with him.

When Wong goes to the local government office to ask if the children can take shelter there, he encounters a military officer, Nap-lan Yun-seut, who spars with him to test his skill in using the staff. Although Nap-lan is impressed with Wong's skill, he does not approve Wong's request. In the meantime, Leung and 13th Aunt bring the children to hide in the British consulate, which is under siege by the White Lotus Sect. At the consulate, Wong meets Sun Wen again and learns that Sun and his friend, Lu Haodong, are part of an underground movement planning to overthrow the Qing government and establish a republic in China. Nap-lan shows up with his soldiers and tries to enter the consulate to capture Lu but the British consul stops him. That night, Nap-lan orders his men to disguise themselves as White Lotus Sect members and break into the consulate. After some time, he leads his soldiers into the consulate under the pretext of protecting the consul and arresting the cult members while actually using the opportunity to hunt down Lu. He secretly kills the British consul when the latter sees through his ruse.

Lu disguises himself as Leung and follows Wong out of the consulate, while Leung pretends to be Lu to distract Nap-lan. Wong and Lu are then forced to travel to the White Lotus Sect's base to confront Priest Gao, the cult's leader. After fighting with the cult members and engaging Gao in a one-on-one fight, Wong defeats Gao and accidentally kills him by causing him to be impaled on the point of a statue's finger, revealing that he was wearing body armour. Wong, Leung and Lu then proceed to retrieve a book, which contains the names of the revolutionaries, from a secret location. However, they encounter Nap-lan and his soldiers, and Lu is fatally shot. While Wong fights with Nap-lan to buy time, Lu and Leung burn the book to prevent it from falling into the Qing government's hands. Before succumbing to his wounds, Lu stops Leung from burning the cloth used to wrap the book and tells him to meet Sun Wen at the pier and pass him the cloth.

Wong and Leung try to escape but they are cornered by Nap-lan. Wong and Nap-lan fight using a bamboo staff and a "cloth staff" (a twisted, long piece of cloth) respectively. During the fight, Nap-lan manages to wrap the cloth around Wong's neck and tries to strangle him, but Wong manages to free himself and slit Nap-lan's throat with a sharp splinter from his broken bamboo staff. As dawn approaches, Wong and Leung make it to the pier, where they throw the cloth to Sun Wen, who opens it up to reveal Lu's design of the Blue Sky with a White Sun flag.

== Cast ==
- Jet Li as Wong Fei-hung
- Donnie Yen as Admiral Nap-Lan Yun-Seut
- Rosamund Kwan as "13th Aunt" Siu-kwan
- Max Mok as Leung Foon
- David Chiang as Lu Haodong
- Zhang Tielin as Sun Wen
- Yen Shi-kwan as Governor Chung
- Ho Ka-kui as Innkeeper Mak
- Paul Fonoroff as the British consul
- Mike Miller as Dr Thompson
- Dion Lam as Governor Chung's assistant
- Hung Yan-yan as "Priest Gao" Kau-kung

== Theme song ==
The iconic theme song, "A Man Should Better Himself" (男兒當自強), was performed in Cantonese by George Lam at the beginning of the film, and by Jackie Chan in the end credits. Chan also sang the Mandarin version.

== Home media ==
On 2 July 2001, DVD was released in Hong Kong Legends at Europe in Region 2.

Two years later, Hong Kong Legends DVD were released on 7 April 2003 at 3 disc set Tsui Hark's Once Upon a Time in China Trilogy.

Three years later, The Donnie Yen Collection DVD were released on 29 May 2006 at 4 disc set including two films they were New Dragon Gate Inn and 2 disc platinum edition Iron Monkey.

== Alternative version ==
The Taiwanese VHS release distributed by Long Shong opens with a seven-minute-long recap of the first film. It also features some scenes that were cut from the international release.

== Reception ==
=== Box office ===
Once Upon a Time in China II was a rare instance where a sequel to a Hong Kong film earned higher at the box office as compared to the previous film. It grossed a total of HK$30,399,676 during its theatrical run and holds a 93% rating on Rotten Tomatoes.

=== Awards and nominations ===
Awards and nominations
| Ceremony | Category | Recipient | Result |
|---|---|---|---|
| 12th Hong Kong Film Awards | Best Film | Once Upon a Time in China II | Nominated |
| 12th Hong Kong Film Awards | Best Director | Tsui Hark | Nominated |
| 12th Hong Kong Film Awards | Best Supporting Actor | Donnie Yen | Nominated |
| 12th Hong Kong Film Awards | Best New Performer | Hung Yan-yan | Nominated |
| 12th Hong Kong Film Awards | Best Art Direction | Eddie Ma | Nominated |
| 12th Hong Kong Film Awards | Best Cinematography | Arthur Wong | Nominated |
| 12th Hong Kong Film Awards | Best Film Editing | Marco Mak | Nominated |
| 12th Hong Kong Film Awards | Best Action Choreography | Yuen Woo-ping | Won |
| 12th Hong Kong Film Awards | Best Original Film Score | Richard Yuen, Johnny Njo | Nominated |
| 29th Golden Horse Film Festival | Best Actor | Jet Li | Nominated |
| 29th Golden Horse Film Festival | Best Supporting Actor | Max Mok | Nominated |
| 29th Golden Horse Film Festival | Best Action Choreography | Yuen Woo-ping | Nominated |
| 29th Golden Horse Film Festival | Best Original Film Song | James Wong | Won |
