= Hero of Tomorrow =

1988 Hong Kong film by Poon Man-kit

- DVD cover
- Traditional Chinese: 江湖接班人
- Simplified Chinese: 江湖接班人
- Hanyu Pinyin: Jiāng Hú Jiē Bān Rén
- Jyutping: Gong1 Wu4 zip3 Baan1 Jan4
- Directed by: Poon Man-kit
- Screenplay by: Clarence Yip
- Produced by: Wallace Chung
- Starring: Max Mok; Michael Miu; William Ho; Cheung Wing-ching; Joan Tong
- Cinematography: Mark Lee
- Edited by: Robert Choi; Chow Tak-yeung
- Music by: Law Kit
- Production companies: Movie Impact; Mei Ao Movies
- Distributed by: Movie Impact
- Release date: 23 September 1988
- Running time: 86 minutes
- Country: Hong Kong
- Language: Cantonese
- Box office: HK$5,278,572

Hero of Tomorrow (released in the Philippines as Blood of the Protector) is a 1988 Hong Kong crime film directed by Poon Man-kit and starring Max Mok and Michael Miu. Miu's nickname, "Third Brother" (三哥), was originated from his character in this film as a former triad leader.

== Plot ==
Three years ago, Lee Sam was a triad leader who was victimized by his enemy when leads him arrested and imprisoned. Upon his release, he single-handedly takes revenge and flees to Taiwan afterwards and takes refugee from Billy Lee, whom he helped before. Sam decides to conceal his identity and leave the underworld but Billy is belligerent and repeatedly makes fuss and finds a newcomer, Crow, to be his scapegoat. Crow has nothing to do all the time and always dreams of becoming a triad leader. Crow is then appreciated by Billy for being his scapegoat and his reputation rises which gets Billy jealous and arranges him to assassinate a police officer in Hong Kong. Billy hires a collateral killer to kill Crow's girlfriend and older sister. The anger of Sam and Crow forces them to be back in the underworld.

== Cast ==
- Max Mok as Crow Yeung Tin-sun (烏鴉/楊天順), a young man who sells betel nut for a living in Taipei who is ambitious of becoming a triad leader, which caused the death of his girlfriend and older sister.
- Michael Miu as Lee Sam / Third Brother (李森/三哥), a former triad leader who seeks vengeance after release from prison and flees to Taiwan. He was betrayed by his own brothers and dishearteningly leaves the underworld.
- William Ho as Billy Lee Kui (李駒), a ruthless triad leader who would even betray his own brothers. He was later killed by Crow.
- Joan Tong as Naive Ng (吳天真), Crow's girlfriend after she was saved by him in a "Hero to the beauty's rescue" style. She was raped by Billy and committed suicide.
- Chin Su-mei as Yeung Lai-ling (楊麗玲), Crow's older sister who develops a relationship with Sam. She was killed Billy while Crow was absent from Taiwan.
- Cheung Wing-ching as Little Santung (小山東), Crow's good friend. He was corrupt with Billy's money and Crow chopped his own finger off to save him.
- Fong Ming-kit as Little Bread (小肉包), Little's Santung's girlfriend.
- Ku Feng as Uncle Chung (鍾叔), a triad elder who helps Lee Sam to flee to Taiwan (cameo)
- Lung Ming-yan as Lung (阿龍), a triad leader who collides with Billy to use Crow to kill a police officer in Hong Kong. He then tries to kill and silence Crow. (cameo)
- Philip Chan as Officer Chan (陳警官), the police officer who Crow was lured to kill. (cameo)
- Blackie Ko as Peter (阿昆), a triad leader whose territories in Taipei were taken by Billy. While failing to negotiate with Billy, he was killed by Crow. (cameo)
- James Tien as Superintendent Cho (曹警司), a gambler in Billy's casino. (cameo)
- Chen Song-yong as Big Ma (馬老大), a Taiwanese triad leader who was killed by Billy.
- Tommy Wong as Ng Kong (吳江), Billy's sworn brother who framed Lee Sam to prison. He was killed by Sam after his release from prison. (cameo)
- Phillip Kwok as Big B (大B), a police officer who is Ng Kong's friend and helped him when he was attacked by Sam. (cameo)
- Thomas Sin as Bulldog (土狗), Billy's henchman
- Chan King as Hong Kong triad leader
- Lam Chung as Hong Kong triad leader
- Shan Chin-po as Peter's gangster
- Mak Wai-cheung as Monkey
- Wong Yiu as Dwarf
- Wong Hung as Hong Kong triad leader
- Liu Chun-hung as Uncle Chung's chauffeur
- Yiu Man-kei as Billy's thug
- Chang Seng-kwong as bodyguard
- Lam Foo-wai as chauffeur
- San Sin

== Release ==
Hero of Tomorrow was released in Hong Kong on 23 September 1988. In the Philippines, the film was released as Blood of the Protector by South Cinema Films on 9 June 1989; Max Mok and Cheung Wing-ching are credited as Bronson Lee and Henry Chang respectively, while action director Wong Shu-tong is credited as Jimmy Wong.

=== Box office ===
The film grossed HK$5,278,572 during its theatrical run from 23 September to 5 October 1988 in Hong Kong.
