= Once Upon a Time in China V =

1994 Hong Kong-Chinese film by Tsui Hark

- Theatrical release poster

Chinese name
- Traditional Chinese: 黃飛鴻之五龍城殲霸
- Simplified Chinese: 黄飞鸿之五龙城歼霸
Transcriptions
Standard Mandarin
- Hanyu Pinyin: Huáng Fēihǒng Zhī Wǔ Lóng Chéng Jiān Bà
Yue: Cantonese
- Jyutping: Wong4 Fei1-hung4 Zi1 Ng5 Lung4 Sing4 Cim1 Baa3
- Directed by: Tsui Hark
- Written by: Tsui Hark; Lau Daai-muk; Lam Kee-to
- Produced by: Tsui Hark; Ng See-yuen
- Starring: Vincent Zhao; Rosamund Kwan; Max Mok
- Cinematography: Ko Chiu-Lam; Derek Wan; Peter Pau Tak-Hai; Tom Lau; Ardy Lam
- Edited by: Marco Mak
- Music by: Tsui Hark
- Production companies: Film Workshop; Paragon Films Ltd.
- Distributed by: Golden Harvest; Warner Bros. Pictures
- Release date: 17 November 1994
- Running time: 101 minutes
- Countries: Hong Kong; China
- Languages: Cantonese; Mandarin; English
- Box office: HK$4,902,426.00

Once Upon a Time in China V is a 1994 martial arts action film written and directed by Tsui Hark. A Hong Kong-Chinese co-production, the film is the fifth installment in the Once Upon a Time in China film series, with Vincent Zhao reprising his role as Chinese martial arts master and folk hero of Cantonese ethnicity Wong Fei-hung after taking over the character from Jet Li in Once Upon a Time in China IV. The film also saw the return of Hark as director (he only co-wrote and produced the fourth film) and of Rosamund Kwan as "13th Aunt", who was absent in the fourth film.

== Plot ==
After the armies of the Eight-Nation Alliance occupy Beijing, the collapse of the Qing Dynasty is imminent. Wong Fei-hung and his companions return to Foshan in southern China and prepare to move to Hong Kong (then a British colony) in the meantime, Wong Fei-hung develops a love triangle with his romantic interests "13th Aunt" and "14th Aunt".

When they arrive at the port town, they see that the town is in a desolate state, as the authorities have fled with all the public funds, leaving the local army garrison without any money or food. The situation worsens with the presence of pirates, who terrorise the coast and seal off the sea route. Wong and his companions decide to form a local crime prevention force to deal with the threats, leading to three confrontations with the pirates and eventual victory for the protagonists. Wong and his family decide to settle in Hong Kong to help the local government maintain peace and security.

== Cast ==
- Vincent Zhao as Wong Fei-hung
- Rosamund Kwan as "13th Aunt" Yee Siu-kwan
- Max Mok as Leung Foon
- Kent Cheng as Lam Sai-wing ("Porky Wing")
- Roger Kwok as So Sai-man ("Bucktooth" So)
- Hung Yan-yan as Kwai Geuk-chat ("Clubfoot Seven Chiu-Tsat")
- Jean Wang as "14th Aunt" May
- Lau Shun as Wong Kei-ying
- Tam Bing-man as Boss
- Elaine Lui as "Single-eyed" Ying
- Zhang Tielin as Chief constable Xie Sibao
- Stephen Tung as Junior Cheung
- Dion Lam as Flying Monkey
- Sam Hoh as pirate
- Lau Siu-ming as pirate
- James Wong
- Kenji Tanigaki
- Yee Tin-hung as Devil Cheung

== Box office ==
Despite receiving more positive reviews than Once Upon a Time in China IV, the fifth in the series performed poorly at the Hong Kong box office, grossing only HK$4,902,426.
