= Night Life Hero =

1992 Hong Kong film by Yuen Jun-man

- Film poster
- Directed by: Yuen Jun-man
- Written by: Lam Goon-Kiu; Yuen Jun-man
- Produced by: Chan Kin-ting; Sak Lap-fai
- Starring: Max Mok; Fennie Yuen; Chin Ka-lok; Shing Fui-On; Perrie Lau; Bowie Wu
- Cinematography: Puccini Yu
- Edited by: Wong Ming-kong
- Music by: Mak Hiu-lun; Sherman Chow
- Production company: Videocam Film Productions
- Distributed by: Regal Films Distribution
- Release date: 12 November 1992
- Running time: 120 minutes
- Country: Hong Kong
- Language: Cantonese
- Box office: HK$1,970,273

Night Life Hero (released in the Philippines as I Love You Baby) is a 1992 Hong Kong action comedy film written and directed by Yuen Jun-man. This film stars Max Mok, Fennie Yuen and Chin Ka-lok.

== Cast ==
- Max Mok as Chung
- Fennie Yuen as Baby
- Chin Kar-lok as Peter
- Shing Fui-On as Chiu
- Perrie Lai as Pretty
- Bowie Wu as James Lee
- Sam Wong as Smartie
- Ridley Tsui as Wah
- Wong Kar-leung as Thug and servant
- Benny Lai as Kuen
- Stuart Ong as Baby's fiance
- Stephen Tung as Red car owner (cameo)
- Chan Chi-fai as Thug
- James Ha as Thug
- Simon Lung as Restaurant customer
- Chun Hung as Restaurant customer
- Michael
- Fei Ming
- Simon Cheung as Policeman
- William Leung as Thug
- Cheung Siu as Street restaurant owner
- Hui Sze-man as Mrs Chan
- Choi Hin-cheung as Thug
- Chan King-chi as Thug
- Ching Wai-chung as Thug
- Wong Kim-wai as Thug
- Ching Kwok-leung as Thug
- Sep Lap-fai
- Bald Barry

== Release ==
Night Life Hero was released in Hong Kong on 12 November 1992. In the Philippines, the film was released as I Love You Baby by Harvest Films on 11 February 1993.

=== Box office ===
This film grossed HK$1,970,273 during its theatrical run in Hong Kong.
