= The Sting (1992 film) =

1992 Hong Kong film by Nico Wong

- DVD cover
- Traditional Chinese: 俠聖
- Simplified Chinese: 侠圣
- Hanyu Pinyin: Xiá Shèng
- Jyutping: Hap6 Sing3
- Directed by: Nico Wong
- Written by: Johnny Lee; Lee Ying-kit
- Produced by: Billy Chan
- Starring: Andy Lau; Rosamund Kwan; Simon Lui; Bowie Lam
- Cinematography: Louis Yuen; Lee San-yip
- Edited by: Chan Kei-hop
- Music by: Lee Hon-kam; Marco Wan
- Production company: Wong's Film Company
- Distributed by: Regal Films Distribution
- Release date: 19 November 1992
- Running time: 92 minutes
- Country: Hong Kong
- Language: Cantonese
- Box office: HK$6,660,687

The Sting is a 1992 Hong Kong action comedy film directed by Nico Wong and starring Andy Lau, Rosamund Kwan, Simon Lui and Bowie Lam.

== Plot ==
Simon Tam (Andy Lau) is a righteous private detective who is working for free for 3 years and 8 months at the behest of his superstitious mentor. Simon has completed 3 years, 7 months, and 28 days as the backstory is completed.

On the second to last day of that period, his assistant Joe (Simon Lui) accepts a case involving missing money and an advance down payment of HK$1,000,000. The next day, the client mysteriously dies; Simon decides to find the money for the client's wife, Yvonne (Rosamund Kwan). The missing money turns out to amount to ten thousand million (i.e., ten American billion) Hong Kong dollars of triad money; both Simon and the triads chase after it.

== Cast ==
- Andy Lau as Simon Tam
- Rosamund Kwan as Yvonne
- Simon Lui as Joe
- Bowie Lam as Inspector Michael Lee
- Chin Ho
- Shing Fui-On
- Wai Kei-shun
- Lo Hung
- Pau Fong as Simon's mentor
- Henry Fong
- Michael Dinga
- Mandy Chan as bald killer
- Tsang Kan-wing as Tsang
- Hon Ping
- Leung Biu-ching
- Raymond Tsang
- Bill Lung as Biu
- Tse Wai-kit as triad member
- Chun Kwai-po as monk
- Chow Kam-kong
- Chan Sek
- Ng Kwok-kin as policeman
- Jacky Cheung Chun-hung
- Wong Chi-keung
- Choi Kwok-keung as granny assassin
- So Wai-nam
- Lam Kwok-kit
- Leung Kei-hei as thug
- Lee Chuen-hau as thug
- Lui Siu-ming
- Huang Kai-sen

== Box office ==
The film grossed HK$6,660,687 at the Hong Kong box office during its theatrical run from 19 November to 2 December 1992 in Hong Kong.
