= Once Upon a Time in China III =

1993 Hong Kong film by Tsui Hark

- Theatrical release poster

Chinese name
- Traditional Chinese: 黃飛鴻之三獅王爭霸
- Simplified Chinese: 黄飞鸿之三狮王争霸
Transcriptions
Standard Mandarin
- Hanyu Pinyin: Huáng Fēihǒng Zhī Sān Shīwáng Zhēngbà
Yue: Cantonese
- Jyutping: Wong4 Fei1-hung4 Zi1 Saam1 Si1-wong4 Zaang1-baa3
- Directed by: Tsui Hark
- Written by: Tsui Hark; Cheung Tan; Chan Tin-suen
- Produced by: Tsui Hark; Ng See-yuen
- Starring: Jet Li; Rosamund Kwan; Max Mok; Hung Yan-yan
- Cinematography: Andrew Lau; Chow Man-keung
- Edited by: Marco Mak; Angie Lam
- Music by: William Wu Wai-lap; Tsui Hark
- Production companies: Golden Harvest; Paragon Films Ltd. Film Workshop
- Distributed by: Golden Harvest
- Release dates: December 1992 (Taiwan); 11 February 1993 (HK)
- Running time: 105 minutes
- Country: Hong Kong
- Languages: Cantonese; Mandarin; English; Russian
- Box office: HK$27.54 million

Once Upon a Time in China III (Chinese: 黃飛鴻之三獅王爭霸; lit. 'Wong Fei-Hung 3: The Lion King Competition') is a 1992 Hong Kong martial arts film directed, produced, and co-written by Tsui Hark. The third installment of the Once Upon a Time in China film series, it stars Jet Li as Wong Fei-hung, along with Rosamund Kwan, Max Mok and Hung Yan-yan. It was released first in South Korea in December 1992, before being released in Hong Kong by Golden Harvest on 11 February 1993.

== Plot ==
In the late 19th century China during the Qing dynasty Chinese sovereignty is being eroded by foreign imperialism. Empress Dowager Cixi and Li Hongzhang decide to stage a lion dance competition to showcase Chinese martial arts and restore national pride. Interested parties from all over China are invited to participate and compete for the title of "Lion Dance King".

Wong Fei-hung travels by train from Foshan to Beijing with his romantic interest 13th Aunt and apprentice Leung Foon to meet his father, Wong Kei-ying, at the Cantonese Ten Tigers Association. At the train station, 13th Aunt meets Tomanovsky, a Russian diplomat, who was her classmate when she was studying in Britain. He starts vying for her attention and annoys Wong, who is disgusted by the Western custom of kissing a woman's hand. When Wong reaches the Association, he learns that his father has been attacked by a wealthy rival martial artist, Chiu Tin-bak, and Chiu's henchman, Clubfoot. Luckily, the elder Wong sustained only minor injuries. Wong Kei-ying decides to give his blessings to his son and 13th Aunt when he sees their romantic relationship.

Before the competition officially begins, all the lion dance troupes that have gathered in Beijing are already fighting among themselves and holding another competition of their own. Wong does not participate and spectates instead. Unknown to him, Leung and his friends have secretly joined the competition out of mischief. A short chase takes place between Clubfoot and Leung when the latter annoys the former during the contest and flees. Clubfoot's legs are crushed when Leung accidentally releases a stampede of horses from a stable. Chiu abandons Clubfoot when he sees that he is now a useless cripple. Wong takes pity on Clubfoot, brings him in, and heals his legs. Clubfoot is initially hostile towards Wong, but he feels so touched and grateful to Wong that he starts bawling emotionally, and becomes Wong's new apprentice.

With the aid of a camera given to her by Tomanovsky, 13th Aunt inadvertently uncovers a plot to assassinate Li Hongzhang during the competition and learns that Tomanovsky is one of the conspirators. She warns Wong, who joins the contest to stop the assassins. In the final round of the competition, Wong, Leung and Clubfoot fight with dozens of rival lion dancers as they battle their way to the top of a scaffold. Chiu also joins the competition and carries a large and deadly lion mask. Wong ultimately defeats Chiu and wins the competition.

In the meantime, Tomanovsky fails to assassinate Li Hongzhang and is shot dead by his fellow Russians, who claim to the Chinese that he was a spy working for the Japanese. Although Wong wins the prize (a gold medal) he remarks that it is ultimately a defeat for the Chinese because of all the infighting. He then tosses the medal back to Li Hongzhang, turns his back and walks away.

== Cast ==
- Jet Li as Wong Fei-hung
- Rosamund Kwan as "13th Aunt" Siu-kwan
- Max Mok as Leung Foon
- Hung Yan-yan as "Clubfoot" Kwai Geuk-chat
- Lau Shun as Wong Kei-ying
- John Wakefield as Tomanovsky
- Chiu Chin as Chiu Tin-bak
- Wong Tak-yan as Yan
- Ge Cunzhuang as Li Hongzhang
- Meng Chin as Empress Dowager Cixi
- Zhang Chun-zhong as Master Chiu

== Release and reception ==
Once Upon a Time in China III opened during the Christmas season in Taiwan in 1992. It was the eight highest grossing films in Hong Kong box office in 1993, earning 27.54 million Hong Kong Dollars. In Taiwan, it was among the highest grossing Chinese-language films of the year, earning 39.27 million New Taiwan dollars. Marco Mak and Angie Lam were nominated at the 13th Hong Kong Film Awards for Best Editing.

On Rotten Tomatoes, Once Upon a Time in China III got 67%, based on 9 reviews while Marc Salvov of The Austin Chronicle gave it 2.5 out of 5. Panos Kotzathanasis of the Asian Movie Pulse said that "[the film] is the most personal film of the trilogy".

== Alternate versions ==
The film was released in Hong Kong on VHS by Paragon Films in 1996. The opening is in Mandarin while the rest of the film is in Cantonese. It was converted from a LaserDisc and some chapters are incorrectly arranged. The film was released again in Hong Kong on DVD by Hong Kong Legends on 21 January 2002.

The Taiwanese release of the film is in Mandarin and has 15 minutes more footage than the Hong Kong version. It was distributed by Long Shong Pictures and features a 4:3 cropped image with embedded Chinese and English subtitles, and the distributor's logo on the upper left corner of the screen.

Both the Hong Kong and Taiwanese versions were released on DVD in North America by Columbia TriStar. There is also an English export version of the film called The Invincible Shaolin. In comparison with the original version, the end credits of The Invincible Shaolin are in English and some footage is cut out.
