= Once Upon a Time in China =

1991 Hong Kong film by Tsui Hark

- Film poster

Chinese name
- Traditional Chinese: 黃飛鴻
- Simplified Chinese: 黄飞鸿
Transcriptions
Standard Mandarin
- Hanyu Pinyin: Huáng Fēihóng
Yue: Cantonese
- Jyutping: Wong^{4} Fei^{1}-hung^{4}
- Directed by: Tsui Hark
- Written by: Tsui Hark; Yuen Kai-chi; Leung Yiu-ming; Elsa Tang
- Produced by: Tsui Hark
- Starring: Jet Li; Yuen Biao; Jacky Cheung; Rosamund Kwan; Kent Cheng
- Cinematography: Ardy Lam; Bill Wong; David Chung; Arthur Wong; Wingo Chan; Wilson Chan
- Edited by: Marco Mak
- Music by: James Wong
- Production companies: Golden Harvest; Paragon Films; Film Workshop
- Distributed by: Golden Harvest
- Release date: 15 August 1991
- Running time: 134 minutes
- Country: Hong Kong
- Language: Cantonese
- Box office: HK$29,672,278

Once Upon a Time in China (Chinese: 黃飛鴻; lit. 'Wong Fei-hung') is a 1991 Hong Kong martial arts film directed, produced, and co-written by Tsui Hark. It stars Jet Li as Wong Fei-hung, a Chinese martial arts master, physician, and folk hero in late-19th-century Guangzhou. The film also features Yuen Biao, Jacky Cheung, Rosamund Kwan, and Kent Cheng.

The first installment of the Once Upon a Time in China film series, it was a critical and commercial success upon its initial release, and has come to be regarded as one of the most influential martial arts films of all time. At the 11th Hong Kong Film Awards, the film won in four categories, including Best Director and Best Action Choreography.

== Plot ==
The film is set in Foshan, China sometime in the late 19th century during the Qing dynasty. Liu Yongfu, the commander of the Black Flag Army, invites Wong Fei-hung on board his ship to watch a lion dance. Sailors on board a nearby French ship hear the sound of firecrackers and mistakenly think that Liu's ship is firing at them so they return fire and injure the dancers. Wong picks up the lion head and finishes the performance. Liu comments about the perilous situation China is in, and then gives Wong a hand fan inscribed with all the unequal treaties signed between China and other countries.

Wong is the martial arts instructor of the local militia in Foshan. He also runs his own traditional Chinese medicine clinic, Po-chi-lam, and has three apprentices: the hotheaded and heavyset "Porky", the American-born medic "Bucktooth" So, and the levelheaded Kai. He meets Siu-kwan, the daughter of a sworn brother of his grandfather, who recently returned from a sojourn in England. Even though she is around the same age as him, he still has to address her as "13th Aunt" as she is considered more "senior" than him. They have romantic feelings for each other but their relationship is restrained because it is taboo in the conservative Chinese society of their time.

Leung Foon arrives in Foshan with an opera troupe to stage performances. He encounters 13th Aunt by chance, has a few clumsy encounters with her, and develops a crush on her. He also runs into trouble with the Shaho Gang from Liaoning, which terrorises and extorts money from local businesses. A fight breaks out between the gang and the local militia while Wong is meeting the Governor of Foshan in a restaurant. The gangsters flee when they realise they are no match for Wong. The Governor blames Wong for the disturbance, and disbands and arrests the militia members. Wong confronts the Shaho Gang's leader, defeats him and captures him, but the authorities release him because no one wants to help Wong by testifying as a witness in court.

In the meantime, Leung Foon meets a northern martial artist, "Iron Vest" Yim, and decides to follow him. Yim wants to become famous and start a martial arts school in Foshan, but he needs to prove himself first. One night, the Shaho Gang sets fire to Po-chi-lam in revenge. After a Jesuit priest identifies the Shaho Gang to be behind the arson attack, the gang flee and take shelter under Jackson, an American businessman. In return for protection from the foreigners, the Shaho Gang helps Jackson run his underground human trafficking ring by kidnapping Chinese women to be sent to America as prostitutes. When Wong and the Governor are watching an opera performance, the Shaho Gang and Jackson's men ambush them and try to assassinate the Governor and kill Wong. Their plan fails but many innocent people at the theatre are wounded or killed, including the priest who blocks a fatal shot from Jackson's right-hand man, Tiger who was trying to kill Wong. The Governor blames Wong and threatens to arrest and execute him, but allows him to give medical attention to the injured.

While tending to the injured people in his clinic, Wong meets an escaped Chinese labourer from America who relates his story of how he and his fellow labourers were treated in America. Just then, Yim arrives at Po-chi-lam and insists on challenging Wong to a fight to prove he is the better fighter. Yim leaves with Leung Foon, who was fired from the opera troupe, after Yim and Wong's fight was left unresolved. Yim issues a challenge to Wong for a rematch. Shortly after Yim left, the Governor shows up and orders his men to search Po-chi-lam for fugitives. Wong and his apprentices fight with the Governor's men until 13th Aunt, "Bucktooth" So and the labourer have escaped. Wong then surrenders himself and is imprisoned along with his apprentices, resulting in him being unable to appear for the publicized rematch. The Shaho Gang then hires Yim – even though Leung strongly objects to Yim working with the gang. In the meantime, the Shaho Gang kills the labourer, abducts 13th Aunt and takes her to their base. "Bucktooth" So escapes and goes to the prison to inform Wong. The prison guards release Wong and his apprentices out of respect for him.

Wong and his apprentices disguise themselves and infiltrate Jackson's base to find and rescue 13th Aunt. Yim engages Wong in a one-on-one fight and again, Wong defeats Yim convincingly, and realises that Yim has been cheating in fights; there is a small spearhead tied onto the tip of Yim's queue (which Wong uses to tear Yim's queue in retaliation for cheating) at the same time, Wong's apprentices and Leung Foon overcome the Shaho Gang and Jackson's men, and save 13th Aunt and the kidnapped women. Just as Wong is about to board Jackson's ship, Yim shows up, wanting to resume his fight with Wong, and gets fatally shot by Jackson's men. With his dying breath, he tells Wong that "martial arts stand no chance against guns". During the fight on the ship, the Shaho Gang's leader meets his end after being pushed into a furnace. At the critical moment, Jackson takes the Governor hostage at gunpoint, but Wong kills Jackson by using his fingers to flick an unused bullet into Jackson's forehead, and saves the Governor. At the end of the film, Wong accepts Leung as his fourth apprentice and they take a group photo in Po-chi-lam.

== Cast ==
- Jet Li as Wong Fei-hung
- Yuen Biao as Leung Foon
- Jacky Cheung as "Bucktooth" So Sai-man
- Rosamund Kwan as "13th Aunt" Siu-kwan
- Kent Cheng as "Porky" Lam Sai-wing
- Yuen Kam-fai as Ling Wan-kai
- Yen Shi-kwan as "Iron Vest" Yim
- Jonathan Isgar as Jackson
- Steve Tartalia as Tiger
- Mark King as General Wickens
- Lau Shun as Liu Yongfu
- Yau Kin-kwok as Tong, Shaho gang leader
- Wong Chi-yeung as the Governor
- Yuen Cheung-yan as Yim's opponent
- Colin George as Jesuit Priest
- Hung Yan-yan as Shaho Gang member
- Wu Ma as Granduncle Cheung
- Shih Kien as old man who gives advice

== Release and reception ==
Once Upon a Time in China was released in Hong Kong on 15 August 1991. The film was a box office hit and is largely credited with starting the period martial arts craze of the early to mid 1990s. It ran for almost two months, the longest duration for any of the series, and grossed HK$29,672,278 in Hong Kong. In the Philippines, the film was released as Enter the New Game of Death by First Films on 15 October 1992.

=== Critical response ===
Once Upon a Time in China was given highly favorable reviews from film critics. On the review aggregator website Rotten Tomatoes, 90% of 31 critics' reviews are positive.

=== Accolades ===
Awards and nominations
Ceremony	Category	Name	Result
11th Hong Kong Film Awards
11th Hong Kong Film Awards	Best Film	Once Upon a Time in China	Nominated
11th Hong Kong Film Awards	Best Director	Tsui Hark	Won
11th Hong Kong Film Awards	Best Supporting Actor	Jacky Cheung	Nominated
11th Hong Kong Film Awards	Best Film Editing	Marco Mak	Won
11th Hong Kong Film Awards	Best Cinematographer	Ardy Lam, Bill Wong, David Chung, Arthur Wong, Wingo Chan, Wilson Chan	Nominated
11th Hong Kong Film Awards	Best Art Direction	Yee Chung-Man	Nominated
11th Hong Kong Film Awards	Best Action Choreography	Yuen Cheung-yan, Yuen Shun-yee, Lau Kar-wing	Won
11th Hong Kong Film Awards	Best Original Film Score	James Wong	Won

== Bibliography ==
- Morton, Lisa (2009). The Cinema of Tsui Hark. McFarland. ISBN 978-0-7864-4460-1.
