= City Kids 1989 =

1989 Hong Kong film by Poon Man-kit

- DVD cover
- Traditional Chinese: 人海孤鴻
- Simplified Chinese: 人海孤鸿
- Hanyu Pinyin: Rén Hǎi Gū Hóng
- Jyutping: Jan4 Hoi2 Gu1 Hung4
- Directed by: Poon Man-kit
- Screenplay by: Jubic Chui; James Yuen; Clarence Yip
- Produced by: Clarence Yip
- Starring: Andy Lau; Max Mok; Wong Chung; May Lo; Paw Hee-ching
- Cinematography: Mark Lee Ping Bin
- Edited by: Robert Choi
- Music by: Richard Lo
- Production company: Movie Impact
- Distributed by: Movie Impact
- Release date: 5 August 1989
- Running time: 94 minutes
- Country: Hong Kong
- Language: Cantonese
- Box office: HK$10,627,142

City Kids 1989 is a 1989 Hong Kong action film directed by Poon Man-kit and starring Andy Lau and Max Mok. The film shares the same Chinese title and a similar plot to the 1969 film, The Orphan, which stars Bruce Lee.

== Plot ==
In 1962, Chow Wing (Wong Chung) flees to Hong Kong from Chiuchow with son Chow Chong-san, his younger sister, Chow Man-sau (Paw Hee-ching) and his niece Lam So-mui. However, Wing was shot by the People's Liberation Army while protecting his family and was separated from them. Man-sau make it Hong Kong along with So-mui and Chong-san, who was renamed Cho-sam when So-mui was registering with an immigration officer who could not understand her Chiuchow accent. Wing also survives from the gunshot and makes it to Hong Kong where he becomes a police officer.

After the 1967 Hong Kong riots, the child Cho-sam meets pickpocket Big Skin Chuen (Shing Fui-On), who takes him in as an underling, where he also befriends Chuen's adopted son, Sas. By the time he becomes a teenager, Cho-sam scores good grades at school while Chuen also takes him as his godson on the night of the latter's birthday. However, during the same night, Chuen is killed by his rivals, so Sas and Cho-sam sell cocaine for drug trafficker Hon (Hon San). However, they take some of the cocaine to sell for their own profit so Hon captures Cho-sam and injects him with cocaine, turning him into an addict.

Cho-sam (Max Mok) successfully curbs his addiction as he grows up after three tries, but he has become an underling of triad leader, Yellow (Stephen Chang), while Sas follows rival triad leader, Mad Dog (Shing Fui-on), but they are still good friends despite so. Sas turns his flat into a disco where Cho-sam meets May (May Lo), whom he falls in love with and marries after getting her pregnant. On the night of their wedding banquet, Sas finds out Cho-sam cannot afford his wedding bill so Sas helps his friend by robbing a rich man. After the banquet, Sas and Cho-sam gets into a fight with police officers who was called by the rich man and Cho-sam stabs one of the cops during the scuffle.

Sas and Cho-sam were sentenced to six years of imprisonment as a result, where Cho-sam also finds out May aborted their child. In prison, Sas gets into a dispute with Yellow, so in order to settle it, Sas's boss (David Chung) picks him to represent his gang to fight Cho-sam, who was picked by Yellow to represent him. After the fight, Cho-sam says he does not want to. E a triad anymore while Sas wants to open a nightclub in Tsim Sha Tsui and they proceed with Sas's plan after getting out of prison and borrow HK$200,000 from loan shark Brother Fu (Newton Lai). Cho-sam later bumps into May and her boyfriend while hanging in a nightclub where Sas nearly starts a fight with May's boyfriend. However, Cho-sam and May reconcile when they bump into each other again.

With their loaned money, Sas and Cho-sam start a brothel but Wing leads his team to bust it and humiliates Sas in the streets. Wing continually busts their brothel and they were unable to pay off their debt, so Fu captures and beats them. When Was fights back, Fu offers a them to help him kidnap a rich child, Ka-po, who is May's tutor student. Sas and Cho-sam snatched the ransom from Ka-po's father, Mr. Kan, on a motorcycle, and brings it to Fu. However, Cho-sam decides he wants to rescue Ka-po so Sas joins him, fighting off Fu's henchmen and bringing the child to May. Afterwards, while driving to the harbour to flee, Sas and Cho-sam were ambushed by Fu's henchmen leading to a car chase where Cho-sam jumps out of Sas's car and destroys one of the henchmen's car with a forklift. However, Sas is run over by one of the henchmen's car after he jumps out of his exploding car.

Cho-sam carries Sas to the hospital Wing and Man-sau, who had reunited after the latter saw her brother on the news, are also present and Man-sau informs Cho-sam that Wing is his father. After Sas dies from his injuries, Cho-sam angrily drives to Fu's office to avenge his friend while Wing follows. Cho-sam fights Fu and his chief henchman, Yiu (Thomas Sin). Right on the verge of killing Fu, Wing convinces his son to stop and not to ruin his own life.

== Cast ==
- Andy Lau as Sas (沙士), an orphan who adopted by pickpocket Big Skin Chuen and becomes best friends with Cho-sam when the latter was also taken in by his adopted father. He is hot-headed and abrasive, but a very loyal friend
- Max Mok as Lam Cho-sam (林初三), born Chow Chong-san (周創山), a refugee from Chiuchow who was brought up by his aunt after separated from his father. He is best friends with Sas since childhood and is more mild-mannered compared to his friend.
- Wong Chung as Chow Wing (周榮), Cho-sam's father who was separated from his son and sister after he was shot by the People's Liberation Army while fleeing to Hong Kong, where he successfully arrives and becomes a police inspector.
- May Lo as May, Cho-sam's girlfriend whom he marries after getting her pregnant. After he was imprisoned, she aborts their child but eventually reconciles with him.
- Paw Hee-ching as Chow Man-sau (周文秀), Wing's younger sister and Cho-sam's aunt who brought up his nephew.
- Newton Lai as Brother Fu (富哥), a loan shark who loans HK$200,000 to Sas and Cho-sam and forces then to kidnap Ka-po for ransom when they cannot pay off their debt.
- Shing Fui-On as Big Skin Chuen (高佬泉), a pickpocket gang leader who is Sas's adopted father and takes Cho-sam as his godson who is rough-mannered but a kind man inside.
- Blackie Ko as a killer sent by Chuen's rival to kill him.
- Stephen Chang as Yellow (虧哥), Cho-sam's triad boss.
- Chun Kwai-po as Fu's henchman.
- Ho Kit as Lam So-mui (林素梅), Man-sau's daughter and Cho-sam's older cousin who despises and looks down on him.
- Tam Siu-ying as May's mother.
- Hon San as Brother Hon (漢哥), a drug trafficker Sas and Cho-sam worked for as teenager. When they cheated off him, he injects cocaine into Cho-sam and turned him into an addict
- Fong Ka-wai
- Mok Hon-kei
- Chan King-chuen as May's father who thinks Cho-sam is unworthy of his daughter.
- Ngai Ming-yiu
- Thomas Sin as Yiu (阿耀), Fu's chief henchman.
- Kan Sek-ming as Mr. Kan (簡生), a rich man and Ka-po's father.
- Shing Fuk-on as Mad Dog (喪狗), Sas's triad boss who is Yellow's rival.
- John Cheung as a police officer.
- Fei Pak as a police officer
- Lui Siu-ming as a prisoner.
- Fung Kam-hung as a prisoner.
- Cheng Siu as a prisoner.
- David Chung as Sas's boss in prison who is Yellow's rival.
- Chow Chi-ching
- Poon Man-kit as a bus passenger.
- Sze-to Chi-keung as Hon's henchman.
- Chan Yuen-tat as a policeman who unsuccessfully attempted to bust Sas's disco in his flat.
- Yeung Kim-man
- Hau Woon-ling
- Peter Kwok

== Theme song ==
- I am the Only One (祇有一個人)
  - Composer: Huang Ta-chun
  - Lyricist: Lo Wing-keung
  - Singer: Andy Lau

== Box office ==
The film grossed HK$10,627,142 at the Hong Kong box office during its theatrical run 5 to 24 August 1989 in Hong Kong.

== See also ==
- Andy Lau filmography
