= Marco Mak =

Hong Kong director, editor, production manager, actor, writer, producer and composer

- Born: Marco Mak Chi-Sin; 6 November 1951 (age 75); British Hong Kong
- Occupations: Film director, screenwriter, film producer, film editor

Marco Mak Chi-Sin (Chinese: 麥子善, born 6 November 1951) is a Hong Kong film director, film editor, production manager, actor, screenwriter, film producer, music composer and assistant director.

== Filmography ==
=== Production manager ===
- Crazy Romance (1985)
- Why Why Tell Me Why (1986)

=== Director ===
- The Blood Rules (2000)
- Love Correction (2000)
- A Gambler's Story (2001)
- The Replacement Suspects (2001)
- Cop on a Mission (2001)
- The Wall (2002)
- The Peeping (2002)
- Haunted Office (2002)
- XanDa (2003)
- Colour of the Truth (2003)
- Set to Kill (2005)
- Slim Till Dead (2005)
- Wo Hu (2006)
- House of Mahjong (2007)
- Dancing Lion (2007)
- Naked Soldier (2012)

=== Editor ===
- Tiger & Crane Fists (1976)
- The Discharged (1977)
- Bruce and Shaolin Kung Fu 2 (1978)
- Edge of Fury (1978)
- The Tattoo Connection (1978)
- The Wickedness in Poverty (1979)
- The Incredible Kung Fu Master (1979)
- The Killer in White (1980)
- Absolute Monarch (1980)
- The Legal Illegal (1981)
- Don't Kill Me, Brother (1981)
- Trap (1982)
- I Do! (1983)
- Yu Pui Tsuen (1986)
- The Story of Dr. Sun Yat Sen (1986)
- Watch Out (1986)
- A Terra-Cotta Warrior (1989)
- A Better Tomorrow III: Love & Death in Saigon (1989)
- Runaway Blues (1989)
- Chinese Cop Out (1989)
- Erotic Nights (1989)
- Angel III (1989)
- Swordsman (1990)
- Temptation Summary (1990)
- A Chinese Ghost Story II (1990)
- The King of the Kickboxers (1990)
- Red and Black (1991)
- A Chinese Ghost Story III (1991)
- Bullet for Hire (1991)
- Queen's High (1991)
- King of Chess (1991)
- The Banquet (1991)
- Scheming Wonders (1991)
- Once Upon a Time in China (1991)
- The Raid (1991)
- A Kid from Tibet (1991)
- The Master (1992)
- Fight Back to School II (1992)
- Twin Dragons (1992)
- Once Upon a Time in China II (1992)
- Swordsman II (1992)
- The Wicked City (1992)
- A Kid from Tibet (1992)
- Iron Monkey (1993)
- The Magic Crane (1993)
- Once Upon a Time in China III (1993)
- Once Upon a Time in China IV (1993)
- Forging the Swords (1994)
- Once Upon a Time in China V (1994)
- The Lovers (1994)
- Return to a Better Tomorrow (1994)
- Love in the Time of Twilight (1995)
- Sixty Million Dollar Man (1995)
- Mean Street Story (1995)
- The Chinese Feast (1995)
- Shanghai Grand (1996)
- Dr. Wai in "The Scripture with No Words" (1996)
- God of Gamblers 3: The Early Stage (1996)
- Full Alert (1997)
- We're No Bad Guys (1997)
- Once Upon a Time in China and America (1997)
- Mr. Wai-go (1998)
- The Poet (1998)
- Cheap Killers (1998)
- Love Generation Hong Kong (1998)
- Step Into the Dark (1998)
- The Storm Riders (1998)
- The Black Sheep Affair (1998) a.k.a. The Blacksheep Affair a.k.a. Another Meltdown
- Knock Off (1998)
- The Suspect (1998)
- A True Mob Story (1998)
- Young and Dangerous: The Prequel (1998)
- Operation Billionaires (1998)
- Your Place or Mine! (1998)
- A Chinese Torture Chamber Story II (1998)
- How to Get Rich by Fung Shui? (1998)
- The Group (1998)
- Young and Dangerous 5 (1998)
- The Conman (1998)
- The Mirror (1999)
- Body Weapon (1999)
- No Problem (1999)
- Erotic Nightmare (1999)
- Gigolo of Chinese Hollywood (1999)
- The H.K. Triad (1999)
- Horoscope 1: The Voice from Hell (1999)
- The Conmen in Vegas (1999)
- The Legend of Speed (1999)
- Century of the Dragon (1999)
- Prince Charming (1999)
- Fall for You (2000)
- Love Paradox (2000)
- Time and Tide (2000)
- Raped by An Angel 5: The Final Judgement (2000)
- Miles Apart (2000)
- Winner Takes All (2000)
- The Duel (2000)
- Fist Power (2000)
- My Name Is Nobody (2000)
- Those Were the Days... (2000)
- Cop on a Mission (2001)
- Maniacal Night (2001)
- The Replacement Suspects (2001)
- A Gambler's Story (2001)
- The Legend of Zu (2001)
- City of Desire (2001)
- Everyday Is Valentine (2001)
- Love au Zen (2001)
- The Wall (2002)
- The Wesley's Mysterious File (2002)
- Black Mask 2: City of Masks (2002)
- The Era of Vampires (2002)
- Fighting to Survive (2002)
- The Peeping (2002)
- Beauty and the Breast (2002)
- XanDa (2003)
- Colour of the Truth (2003)
- Hidden Heroes (2004)
- Fantasia (2004)
- Set to Kill (2005)
- Himalaya Singh (2005)
- The Shopaholics (2006)
- Just Another Pandora's Box (2010)
- East Meets West (2011)
- Naked Soldier (2012)
- A Chinese Odyssey Part Three (2016)
- Kung Fu League (2018)

=== Assistant director ===
- Don't Kill Me, Brother (1981)
- New York Chinatown (1982)

=== Producer ===
- Forging the Swords (1994)

=== Music composer ===
- The Mirror (1999)

=== Actor ===
- Love Correction (2000)
- A Gambler's Story (2001)
- Happy Family (2002)
- The Spy Dad (2003)

== Writer ==
- The Replacement Suspects (2001)
- The Wall (2002)
