= Once Upon a Time in China and America =

1997 Hong Kong film by Sammo Hung

- Film poster

Chinese name
- Traditional Chinese: 黃飛鴻之西域雄獅
- Simplified Chinese: 黄飞鸿之西域雄狮
Transcriptions
Standard Mandarin
- Hanyu Pinyin: Huáng Fēihǒng Zhī Xīyù Xíongshī
Yue: Cantonese
- Jyutping: Wong4 Fei1-hung4 Zi1 Sai1-wik6 Hung4-si1
- Directed by: Sammo Hung
- Written by: Sze-to Cheuk-hon; Shut Mei-yee; Sharon Hui; Philip Kwok; So Man-sing
- Produced by: Tsui Hark
- Starring: Jet Li; Rosamund Kwan; Hung Yan-yan; Jeff Wolfe; Power Chan
- Cinematography: Walter Gregg; Lam Fai-tai; Koo Kwok-wah
- Edited by: Marco Mak; Angie Lam
- Music by: Lowell Lo
- Production company: Win's Entertainment
- Distributed by: China Star Entertainment Group; Fortune Star Media Limited; The Criterion Collection
- Release date: 1 February 1997
- Running time: 98 minutes
- Country: Hong Kong
- Languages: Cantonese; Mandarin; English
- Box office: HK$30,268,415

Once Upon a Time in China and America, also known as Once Upon a Time in China VI, (Chinese: 黃飛鴻之西域雄獅) is a 1997 Hong Kong martial arts western film directed by Sammo Hung, who also worked on the film's fight choreography. The film is the sixth and final installment in the Once Upon a Time in China film series. The film also saw the return of Jet Li as Cantonese martial arts master and folk hero Wong Fei-hung, who had been replaced by Vincent Zhao in the fourth and fifth films. The film was released theatrically in Hong Kong on 1 February 1997, and garnered positive reviews.

== Plot ==
The film is set in the early 20th century. Wong Fei-hung, along with his romantic interest 13th Aunt and apprentice Clubfoot, travels from China to America to visit another of his apprentices, "Bucktooth" So, who has recently opened a branch of Po-chi-lam, Wong's traditional Chinese medicine clinic, in San Francisco. While travelling by carriage across the wilderness, they pick up a friendly cowboy, Billy, who is almost dying of thirst. When the party stops to have lunch, a bunch of hostile Native Americans ambush them. Although Wong, 13th Aunt and Clubfoot escape unharmed, their carriage is destroyed. 13th Aunt and Clubfoot are rescued and taken to "Bucktooth" So's clinic. Wong, however, hits his head on a rock and loses his memory as a consequence. He is saved by another Native American tribe.

In San Francisco, Billy tries to stop the corrupt mayor from imposing discriminatory laws to make life difficult for the Chinese migrants. Meanwhile, the Native American tribe that saved Wong gets into trouble with a more powerful rival tribe. The chief's son, Fierce Eagle, is injured by the rival tribe's leader. To everyone's surprise, Wong defeats the rival tribe's leader and half of his men, causing the rival tribe to flee in fear. He eventually makes his way to San Francisco and regains his memory with the help of his companions, but forgets everything that happened during his bout of amnesia.

In the meantime, the mayor has fallen into debt, so he hires a Mexican bandit to help him rob the bank and frames the people in Po-chi-lam for the robbery while he secretly plans to abscond with the loot. Wong and his companions are arrested and sentenced to death by hanging. Just then, the Mexican bandit discovers that the mayor has paid him less than he expects so he returns to claim his money, thus revealing the truth. In the ensuing fight, the mayor is killed and Wong manages to capture the bandit and clear Po-chi-lam's name. At the end of the film, Billy is elected as the new mayor while Wong, 13th Aunt and Clubfoot return to China.

== Cast ==
- Jet Li as Wong Fei-hung
- Rosamund Kwan as "13th Aunt" Yee Siu-kwan
- Hung Yan-yan as Kwai Geuk-chat ("Clubfoot Seven Chiu-Tsat")
- Power Chan as So Sai-man ("Bucktooth" So)
- Jeff Wolfe as Billy
- Joe Sayah as Mexican bandit
- Richard Ng as Uncle Han
- Lau Kar-wing as Lion Dance Drummer
- T.J. Storm as Rival Tribe Indian Brave
- Mars (extra) (uncredited)
- Patrick Lung as Uncle Lung
- Deborah Kay Hooker "Mum"
- Ron Ring
- Ryon Marshall
- Freddy Joe
- Chrysta Bell as Sarah
- William Fung as Immigrant worker
- Johnny Koo as Immigrant worker
- Jerry Wu as Opium Den worker
- Alan Chanas
- Wong Choh-wa
- Fan Chin-hung
- Choi Kwok-keung
- Jason De Hoyos as Fierce Eagle
- Daniel Lujan as Flying Eagle
- Roberto Lopez as Mexican (Gang of seven)

== Production ==
The film was shot at the Alamo Village, the film set originally created for John Wayne's The Alamo and other locations in South Texas. Lau Kar-wing served as the film's assistant and second unit director.

== Awards and nominations ==
Awards and nominations
| Ceremony | Category | Recipient | Result |
|---|---|---|---|
| 17th Hong Kong Film Awards | Best Action Choreography | Sammo Hung | Nominated |

== Box office ==
Jet Li's return to the series opened on the weekend of Chinese New Year, and faced stiff competition from director Hung's own film, Mr. Nice Guy. Still, it grossed HK$30,268,415 at the Hong Kong box office.

== Mandarin version ==
A sync-sound Mandarin soundtrack features a number of the Chinese actors speaking their own language (including Jet Li, Patrick Lung - Richard Ng speaks Cantonese however), whilst others are dubbed.
