= Rosamund Kwan =

Hong Kong actress

Rosamund Kwan Chi Lam
- 關之琳
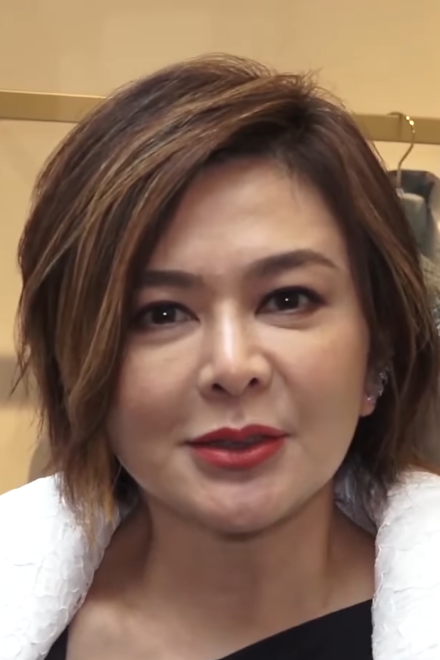
- Kwan in 2018
- Born: Kwan Kar Wai; British Hong Kong
- Occupation: Actress
- Years active: 1982–2004
- Spouses: Chris Wong (m. 1981; div. 1982) Pierre Chen (m. 2014; div. 2015)
- Parent(s): Kwan Shan (father); Cheung Bing Sai (張冰茜) (mother)

Chinese name
- Traditional Chinese: 關之琳
- Simplified Chinese: 关之琳
Transcriptions
Standard Mandarin
- Hanyu Pinyin: Guān Zhīlín
Yue: Cantonese
- Jyutping: Gwaan1 Zi1 lam4

Kwan Kar Wai
- Traditional Chinese: 關家慧
- Simplified Chinese: 关家慧
Transcriptions
Standard Mandarin
- Hanyu Pinyin: Guān Jiāhuì
Yue: Cantonese
- Yale Romanization: Guan Ga Wei
- Jyutping: Gwaan1 Gaa1 wai6

Rosamund Kwan Chi Lam (born Kwan Kar Wai) is a former Hong Kong actress, known for her on-screen pairing with Andy Lau in dramatic films such as Casino Raiders and The Wesley's Mysterious File, and for her role opposite Jet Li as Thirteenth Aunt in the Once Upon a Time in China film series.

== Career ==
Kwan was born in British Hong Kong. Her father, Shaw Brothers star Kwan Shan, was from Shenyang, Liaoning, China, and was of Manchu ethnicity. Her mother, Cheung Bing-sai (張冰茜), was from Shanghai and was also an actress.

Kwan's first acting role was in the ATV soap opera Agency 24 (甜甜廿四味). Her film debut was alongside Chow Yun-fat in the 1982 film, The Head Hunter. She appeared with Jackie Chan, Sammo Hung and Yuen Biao in Twinkle, Twinkle Lucky Stars and again with Chan in Project A Part II and Armour of God. She also appeared with Jet Li in the films Swordsman II, Dr. Wai in "The Scripture with No Words" and as Shao Yun a.k.a. "Sup Sum Yee" ("Shi San Yi" in Mandarin, "13th Aunt" in English) throughout the Once Upon a Time in China film series.

The majority of her acting roles were in dramatic films, notably with Andy Lau in Casino Raiders and The Wesley's Mysterious File. She is known internationally for her roles in Hong Kong action films, alongside a variety of major stars of the genre. Kwan also released a record in 1994, featuring a duet with her on-screen partner Lau called "Love Forever".

In 2001 she appeared in Feng Xiaogang's Chinese comedy, Big Shot's Funeral, along with Donald Sutherland and Ge You. Her last film role was in 2005, and she announced her retirement from acting in 2007.

In 2015, Kwan launched the skincare brand RK Beauty with her socialite friend Helen Ma Tsz-wing. However, after an accountant discovered irregularities in RK’s bank account, suspecting unauthorized and repeated withdrawals of company funds, the brand was ultimately liquidated in 2016.

== Personal life ==
Kwan was married to financial service mogul Chris Wong Kwok Sing in 1981, which had lasted for nine months. They divorced in 1982.

After 7 years of dating, Kwan married Taiwanese businessman Pierre Chen in 2014. She announced their divorce in 2015.

== Selected filmography ==
- The Head Hunter (再見江湖) a.k.a. Long Goodbye (1982) – Vicky Lee
- The Lost Generation (1983) – Shirley
- Feng liu zhong (1984)
- Prince Charming (1984) – Wan Puipui
- Long Road to Gallantry (1984) – Mu Wan Er
- Twinkle, Twinkle Lucky Stars (夏日福星) (1985) – Wang Yi-Ching
- Millionaire's Express (富貴列車) (1986) – Chi
- Armour of God (龍兄虎弟) (1986) – Lorelei
- Project A Part II (A計劃續集) (1987) – Miss Pak
- Profiles of Pleasure (1988) – Chin Chin
- Three Against The World (群龍奪寶) (1988) – Fan's daughter
- Heart to Hearts (1988) – Peggy
- Vengeance Is Mine (1988) – Jane Li-Su
- The Crazy Companies II (最佳損友闖情關) (1988) – Niko
- The Last Duel (再起風雲) (1989) – Pok Mei-Li / Chi Hau
- Proud and Confident (傲氣雄鷹) (1989) – Jennifer Tang
- Ghost Fever (鬼媾人) (1989) – Pinkey
- I Am Sorry (說謊的女人) (1989) – Alice
- Casino Raiders (至尊無上) (1989) – Bo Bo
- What a Small World (我愛唐人街) (1989) – Michelle
- Mr. Smart (瀟洒先生) (1989) – Mona Fong
- Brief Encounter in Shinjuku (錯在新宿) (1990) – Wendy Wan
- Return to Action (喋血風雲) (1990) – Joey Chan
- Tiger Cage 2 (洗黑錢) (1990) – Mandy Chang
- A Bite of Love (一咬OK) (1990) – Anna
- Undeclared War (聖戰風雲) (1990) – Ann Chang
- Tricky Brains (整蠱專家) (1991) – Lucy Ching
- This Thing Called Love (婚姻勿語) (1991) – Janice
- Once Upon a Time in China (黃飛鴻) (1991) – 13th Aunt
- Inspector Pink Dragon (神探馬如龍) (1991) – Julia
- The Banquet (豪門夜宴) (1991) – Gigi
- Pretty Ghost (我老婆唔係人) (1991) – Chia – The Ghost
- Gigolo and Whore II (舞男情未了) (1992) – Sherin Chan
- Swordsman II (笑傲江湖之東方不敗) (a.k.a. The Legend of the Swordsman) (1992) – Yam Ying Ying
- Once Upon a Time in China II (黃飛鴻之二男兒當自強) (1992) – 13th Aunt
- With or Without You (明月照尖東) (1992) – Tweedy
- Gameboy Kids (機Boy小子真假威龍) (1992) – Kwan, Chi-Lam
- Saviour of the Soul 2 (九二神鵰之痴心情長劍) (1992) – The Ice Woman
- The Sting (俠聖) (1992) – Yvonne
- Once Upon a Time in China III (黃飛鴻之三獅王爭霸) (1992) – 13th Aunt
- All's Well, Ends Well Too (花田喜事) (1993) – Snow White
- No More Love, No More Death (太子傳說) (1993) – Tracy Chan
- Love Among the Triad (愛在黑社會的日子) (1993) – Kwok Hoi-Lam
- Blade of Fury (一刀傾城) (1993) – Noblewoman
- The Magic Crane (新仙鶴神針) (1993) – Butterfly Lam
- End of the Road (異域2末路英雄) (1993) – Chei's wife
- Assassin (刺客新傳之殺人者唐斬) (1993) – Yiu
- Love is a Fairy Tale (夏日情未了) (1993) – Michelle
- The Great Conqueror's Concubine (西楚霸王) (1994) – Yu Ji
- Long and Winding Road (錦繡前程) (1994) – Winnie Tsang
- Once Upon a Time in China V (黃飛鴻之五龍城殲霸) (1994) – 13th Aunt
- The Eight Hilarious Gods (笑八仙) (1994) – Ho Sin-gu
- A Touch of Evil (狂野生死戀) (1995) – Coco Xu Liuxin
- The Adventurers (大冒險家) (1995) – Mona
- Dr. Wai in "The Scripture with No Words" (冒險王) (1996) – Monica Kwan / Cammy
- Thanks for Your Love (1/2 次同床) (1996) – Li Lam-Lam
- Once Upon a Time in China and America (黃飛鴻之西域雄獅) (a.k.a. Once Upon a Time in China and America) (1997) – 13th Aunt
- Big Shot's Funeral (大腕) (2001) – Lucy
- The Wesley's Mysterious File (衛斯理藍血人) (a.k.a. The Wesley's Mysterious Story) (2001) – Fong Tin Ai
- Mighty Baby (絕世好B) (2002) – Sabrina
- Hands in the Hair (做頭) (2006) – Aini (final film role)

== Awards and nominations ==
Year	Award	Category	Nominated work	Result
1992	Hong Kong Film Awards	Best Supporting Actress	This Thing Called Love	Nominated
