= Tsui Hark =

Hong Kong filmmaker (born 1951)

- 徐克
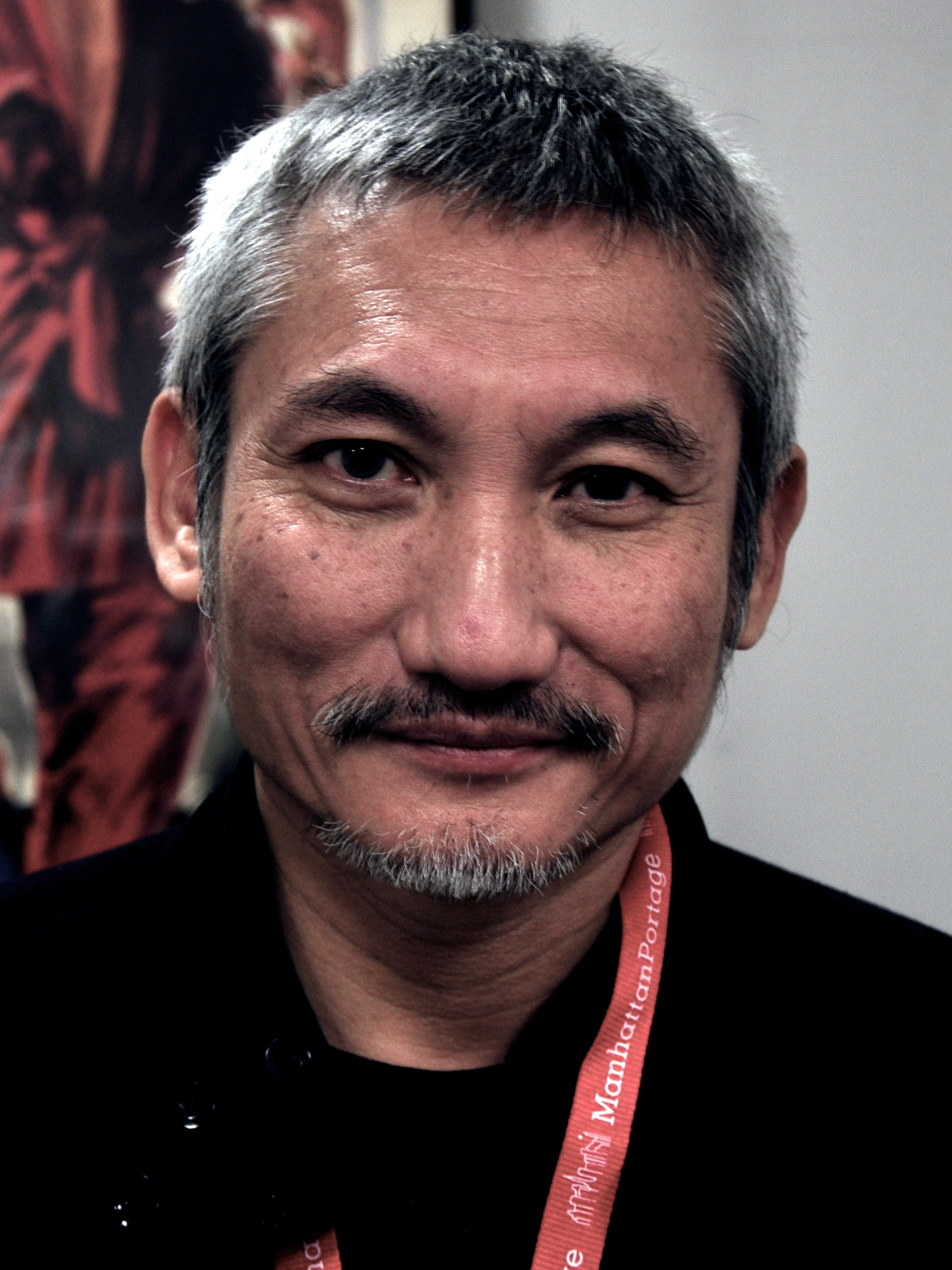
- Tsui at the New York Asian Film Festival on 10 July 2011
- Born: Tsui Man-kong (徐文光); 15 February 1951 (age 75); Saigon, French Indochina (now Ho Chi Minh City, Vietnam)
- Education: Southern Methodist University; University of Texas at Austin
- Occupations: Film director; producer; screenwriter; actor
- Years active: 1977–present
- Spouse: Nansun Shi (m. 1996; div. 2014)
- Awards: See below

Chinese name
- Chinese: 徐克
Transcriptions
Standard Mandarin
- Hanyu Pinyin: Xú Kè
Yue: Cantonese
- Yale Romanization: Chèuih Hāk
- Jyutping: Ceoi4 Hak1

Alternative Chinese name
- Chinese: 徐文光
Transcriptions
Standard Mandarin
- Hanyu Pinyin: Xú Wénguāng
Yue: Cantonese
- Yale Romanization: Chèuih Mahn Gwōng
- Jyutping: Ceoi4 Man4gwong1

Tsui Man-kong (Chinese: 徐文光, Vietnamese: Từ Văn Quang), known professionally as Tsui Hark (Chinese: 徐克, Vietnamese: Từ Khắc, born 15 February 1951), is a Hong Kong filmmaker. A major figure of the Hong Kong New Wave, Tsui gained critical and commercial success with films such as Zu Warriors from the Magic Mountain (1983), the Once Upon a Time in China film series (1991–97), Green Snake (1993), The Lovers (1994), and The Blade (1995). His credits as a writer and producer include A Better Tomorrow (1986), A Chinese Ghost Story (1987), The Killer (1989), Swordsman II (1992), New Dragon Gate Inn (1992), The Wicked City (1992), Iron Monkey (1993), and Black Mask (1996).

Amid the Hong Kong handover, Tsui briefly pursued a career in the United States, directing the Jean-Claude Van Damme–led films Double Team (1997) and Knock Off (1998), before returning to Hong Kong. Since the early 2000s, he has shifted to Mainland–Hong Kong co-productions and found success with blockbusters such as the Detective Dee film series, Flying Swords of Dragon Gate (2011), The Taking of Tiger Mountain (2014), and The Battle at Lake Changjin (2021).

== Early life and education ==
Tsui was born in Saigon, French Indochina, to a large Hoa Chinese family with 16 siblings. He was moved by his father to Guangzhou, China as a child, and grew up there until immigrating to Hong Kong when he turned 14. Tsui showed an early interest in show business and films; when he was 10, he and some friends rented an 8mm camera to film a magic show they put on at school. He also drew comic books, an interest that would influence his cinematic style.

Tsui started his secondary education in Hong Kong in 1966. He proceeded to study film in Texas, first at Southern Methodist University and then at the University of Texas at Austin, graduating in 1975. He claims to have told his parents he wanted to follow in his father's footsteps as a pharmacist, and that it was here he adopted the stage name Hark (克; "overcoming").

After graduation, Tsui moved to New York City, where he worked on From Spikes to Spindles (1976), a noted documentary film by Christine Choy on the history of the city's Chinatown. He also worked as an editor for a Chinese-language newspaper, developed a community theatre group and worked in a Chinese cable TV station. He returned to Hong Kong in 1977.

== Career ==
=== 1977–1981: New Wave period ===
Tsui returned to Hong Kong in 1977 and worked for TVB, the dominant local television station, then moved to its rival, CTV, lured by its general manager Selina Chow. Viewed as having an eye for talent (numerous future New Wave directors got their first directing gigs under Chow) she put Tsui in charge of the martial arts drama, The Gold Dagger Romance, which marked him as a talent to watch.

Producer Ng See-yuen saw Gold Dagger Romance and hired Tsui to direct his first feature, The Butterfly Murders (1979), a technically challenging blend of wuxia, murder mystery and science fiction / fantasy elements. His second film, We're Going to Eat You (1980), was a blend of cannibal horror, black comedy and martial arts. He was quickly typed as a member of Hong Kong's "New Wave" of directors.

Tsui's third film, Dangerous Encounters of the First Kind (1980), was a nihilistic thriller about delinquent youths on a bombing spree. Heavily censored by the British colonial government, it was released in 1981 in a drastically altered version titled Dangerous Encounter – 1st Kind (or alternatively, Don't Play with Fire). The movie out-grossed Tsui's previous two films, however and made him a darling of film critics with writers describing it as "one of those very rare films in the history of Hong Kong cinema that brims with accusation and subversion" and saying that it described "man as trapped animals – this is the popular theme of the New Wave and the one enduring image in their narratives."

=== 1980s–1990s: Golden era ===
In 1981, Tsui joined Cinema City & Films Co., a production company founded by comedians Raymond Wong, Karl Maka and Dean Shek. Cinema City & Films Co. was instrumental in codifying the slick Hong Kong blockbuster films of the 1980s. Tsui played his part in the process with pictures like the crime farce All the Wrong Clues (1981), his first hit, and Aces Go Places 3 (1984), part of the studio's long-running spy spoof series.

In 1983, Tsui directed the wuxia fantasy film Zu Warriors from the Magic Mountain (1983) for the studio Golden Harvest. Tsui imported Hollywood technicians to help create special effects whose number and complexity were unprecedented in Chinese-language cinema.

In 1984, Tsui formed the production company Film Workshop with Nansun Shi. He also developed a reputation as a hands-on and even intrusive producer of other directors' work, fuelled by public breaks with major filmmakers like John Woo and King Hu. His most famous collaboration has probably been with Ching Siu-tung. As action choreographer and/or director on many Film Workshop productions, Ching made a major contribution to the well-known Tsui style.

Film Workshop releases became consistent box office hits in Hong Kong and around Asia, drawing audiences with their visual adventurousness, their broad commercial appeal, and hectic camerawork and pace. With Tsui having been called the 'Steven Spielberg of Asia', Film Workshop became the 'Amblin of Hong Kong'. He produced John Woo's A Better Tomorrow (1986), which launched a craze for Heroic bloodshed movies, and Ching Siu-tung's A Chinese Ghost Story (1987), which did the same for period ghost fantasies. Zu Warriors from the Magic Mountain and The Swordsman (1990) birthed the modern-day special effects industry in Hong Kong.

In fact, Tsui's "movie brat" nostalgia is one of the main ingredients in his work. He often resurrects and revises classic films and genres: the murder mystery in The Butterfly Murders (1979); the Shanghai musical comedy in Shanghai Blues (1985). Peking Opera Blues (1986) plays with and pays tribute to the traditions of the Peking opera that his mother took him to see as a small boy and which had such a strong influence on Hong Kong action cinema. The Lovers (1994) adapts a retold, cross-dressing period romance, best known from Li Han-hsiang's 1963 opera film The Love Eterne. A Chinese Ghost Story remakes Li's supernatural romance The Enchanting Shadow (1959) as a special effects action movie.

The pattern is also seen in perhaps Tsui's most successful work to date, the Once Upon a Time in China film series (1991–97). Jet Li played the role of Chinese folk hero Wong Fei-hung in the first three films and the sixth, Once Upon a Time in China and America. This series is the clearest expression in his oeuvre of Tsui's Chinese nationalism and his passionate engagement with the upheavals of Chinese history, particularly in the face of Western power and influence.

Tsui also dabbled in acting, mostly for other directors. Notable roles include one-third of the comic relief trio in Corey Yuen's film Yes, Madam! (1985) and a villain in Patrick Tam's darkly comic crime story Final Victory (1987), written by Wong Kar-wai. He also made frequent cameo appearances in his own productions, such as a music judge in A Better Tomorrow and a phony FBI agent in Aces Go Places II.

In the face of an industry downturn in the '90s, he directed and produced two expensive movies. Green Snake (1993) was a poetic and lyric movie based on a favourite Chinese fairy tale. The Blade (1995) was a gory, deliberately rough-hewn revision of the 1967 wuxia classic The One-Armed Swordsman.

In the mid-to-late '90s, Tsui tried Hollywood with two films starring Jean-Claude Van Damme: Double Team (1997) and Knock Off (1998). In 2002, he made Black Mask 2: City of Masks, an American market sequel to Jet Li's 1996 film. It was released direct-to-video in the United States in December of that year before being theatrically released in 2003 in Hong Kong.

=== 2000s–present: China-Hong Kong co-productions ===
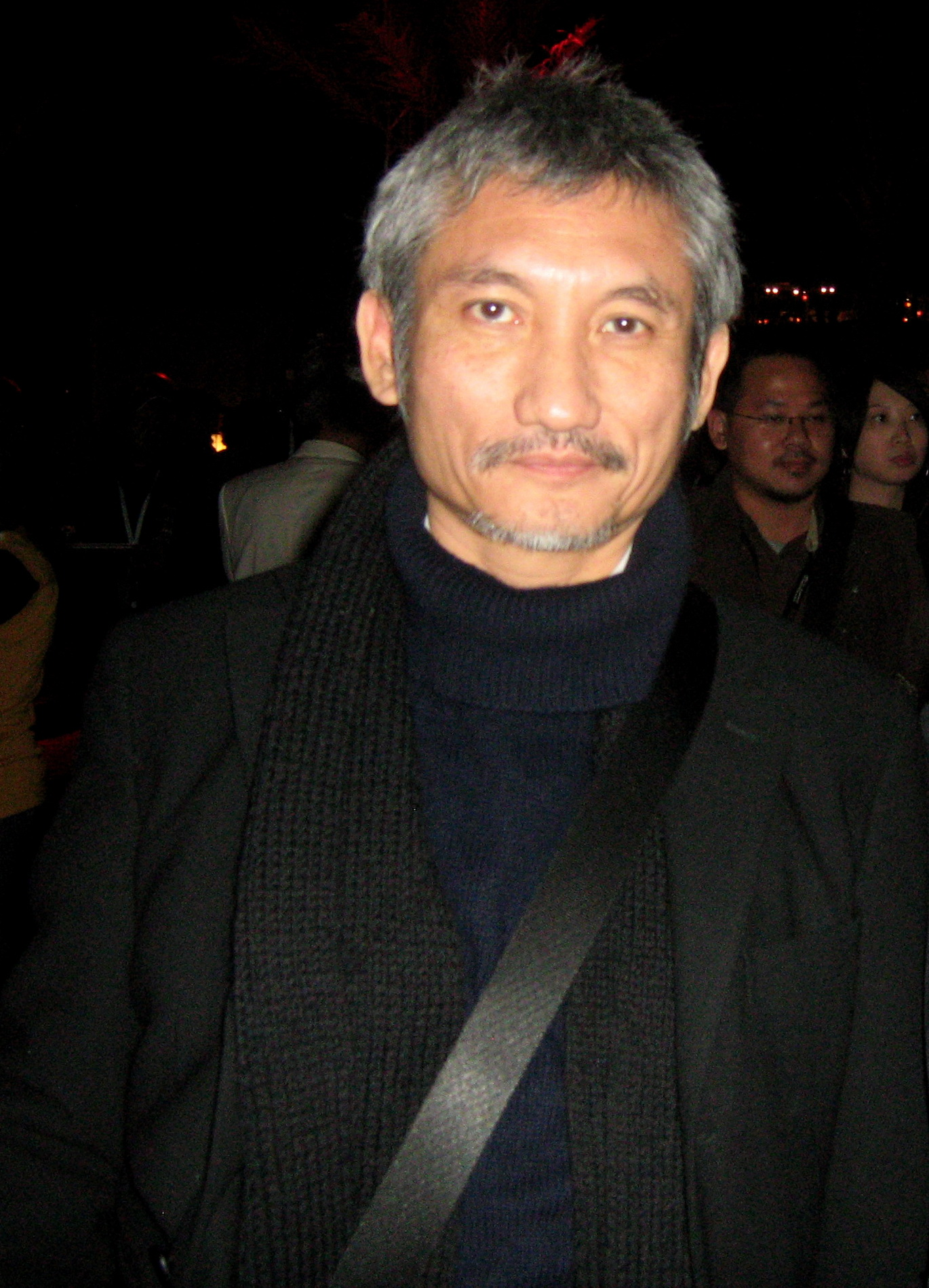
Tsui in 2008

Tsui returned to directing at home in 2000 after not having made a local film since 1996. Time and Tide (2000) and The Legend of Zu (2001) were action extravaganzas with lavish computer-generated imagery that gained cult admirers but no mass success.

Tsui continues to push technical boundaries and revise old favourites. Old Master Q 2001 was Hong Kong's first combination of live action and Pixar-style 3D computer animation. The Era of Vampires (2002; US title, "Tsui Hark's Vampire Hunters") reworked a subgenre popular in the '80s, hybrid martial arts / supernatural horror films featuring the "hopping corpses" of Chinese folk legend. He also directed a short film in 2003, titled Believe It or Not, which was part of the 1:99 Shorts, featuring 11 segments of short films made by various directors and featured many Hong Kong actors to raise awareness against the 2002–2004 SARS outbreak. The following year Tsui also produced a martial arts filmed named Xanda.

In 2005, Tsui launched the multimedia production Seven Swords, a film adaptation of Liang Yusheng's novels Saiwai Qixia Zhuan and Qijian Xia Tianshan. The film came with a television series counterpart (Seven Swordsmen), a comic book series, a cellphone game, clothing brand, and an online multi-player video game. The film was relatively successful, and in February 2006 Tsui announced plans to begin filming the second late in the year. As of 2008, Tsui continues to work on the script for Seven Swords 2 in between filming projects. In 2011 there has been no news nor plans about a Seven Swords 2. Rumors has it that due to lack of interest by the filmmakers of finishing the hexalogy lead the project into being cancelled.

In August 2008, Tsui provided art direction for the direct-to-video anime feature titled Kungfu Master (a.k.a. Wong Fei Hong vs Kungfu Panda), an apparent unofficial sequel to Kung Fu Panda, featuring Chinese folk hero Wong Fei-hung. He also directed the 2008 thriller Missing starring Angelica Lee and the 2008 romantic comedy film All About Women featuring comic graphics and extensive ADR dubbing.

Tsui's latest work in 2010 is Detective Dee and the Mystery of the Phantom Flame, a rare but successful blend of wuxia, suspense-thriller, mystery, and comedy, which was in competition for the Golden Lion award and was also nominated and won numerous other awards.

In 2010, he announced his first 3-D film, The Flying Swords of Dragon Gate, which is a re-imagining of his 1992 film New Dragon Gate Inn starring Tony Leung Ka-Fai, Maggie Cheung and Brigitte Lin. In 2011, Huayi Brothers announced that Tsui will be making a prequel to Detective Dee and the Mystery of the Phantom Flame; shot in 3-D, it was released in 2013 as Young Detective Dee: Rise of the Sea Dragon.

In October 2011, Tsui received the Asian Filmmaker of the Year Award at the 16th Busan International Film Festival for his contributions to Hong Kong cinema. He is the fifth Chinese filmmaker to receive this award at Busan.

His film The Taking of Tiger Mountain premiered in China in December 2014.

Tsui worked on a film with Milkyway Image alongside Ann Hui, Ringo Lam, Patrick Tam, Johnnie To, Sammo Hung and Yuen Woo-Ping. Each director created a segment based on Hong Kong history. The completed film, Septet: The Story of Hong Kong, was shown at the Busan International Film Festival on 21 October 2020 and at the annual Hong Kong International Film Festival in April 2021.

In 2021, Tsui co-directed The Battle at Lake Changjin with Chen Kaige and Dante Lam. The film is the most expensive film ever produced in China, the highest-grossing Chinese film of all time, and the highest-grossing non-English film.

== Personal life ==
Tsui Hark has been married twice. He was briefly married during his time studying in the U.S. in the 1970s. In 1977, he met Nansun Shi while working at Commercial Television in Hong Kong and they began dating a year later. In 1984, they founded a film studio, where Shi was responsible for financing, distribution, and promotion. The couple co-produced over a hundred films. In 1993, rumours circulated about Tsui's affair with Sally Yeh, allegedly causing a temporary split with Shi. In 1996, Tsui and Shi married in Beverly Hills, California. In 2008, Tsui was reported to have been living with Seven Swords (2005) actress Chen Jiajia in Beijing. When asked about their status of marriage, Shi then responded, "Let me give you a standard answer. I've been saying this for years: what happens between two people is private and doesn't concern a third party." By 2011, Tsui began dating his assistant, Lele, whom he had met online during the filming of Flying Swords of Dragon Gate (2011). Shi announced their divorce in 2014, adding that Tsui and Lele had been together for some time.

== Filmography ==
=== Film ===
Year	Title	Functioned as				Notes
Year	Title	Director	Writer	Producer	Other	Notes
1979	The Butterfly Murders	Yes	No	No	No	
1980	We're Going to Eat You	Yes	Yes	No	No	
1980	Dangerous Encounters of the First Kind	Yes	Yes	No	No	
1981	All the Wrong Clues for the Right Solution	Yes	Yes	No	No	
1983	Zu Warriors from the Magic Mountain	Yes	No	No	No	
1983	Search for the Gods	Yes	No	No	No	Short film
1984	Shanghai Blues	Yes	No	Yes	No	
1984	Aces Go Places 3	Yes	No	No	No	
1985	Working Class	Yes	No	Yes	No	
1986	Peking Opera Blues	Yes	No	Yes	No	
1987	A Better Tomorrow II	No	Yes	Yes	No	
1988	The Big Heat	Uncredited	No	Yes	No	
1988	I Love Maria	Uncredited	Uncredited	Yes	No	
1989	A Better Tomorrow III: Love & Death in Saigon	Yes	Yes	Yes	No	
1990	The Swordsman	Uncredited	No	Yes	No	
1990	A Chinese Ghost Story II	No	No	Yes	Yes	Also editor
1991	Once Upon a Time in China	Yes	Yes	Yes	No	
1991	The Raid	Uncredited	Yes	Yes	No	
1991	A Chinese Ghost Story III	Uncredited	Yes	Yes	No	
1991	King of Chess	Uncredited	No	Executive	No	
1991	The Banquet	Yes (Note: Co-directed with Alfred Cheung, Joe Cheung and Clifton Ko)	Yes	No	No	
1992	Twin Dragons	Yes (Note: Co-directed with Ringo Lam)	Yes	No	No	
1992	Once Upon a Time in China II	Yes	Yes	Yes	No	
1992	The Master	Yes	Yes	Yes	No	
1992	Swordsman II	No	Yes	Yes	No	
1992	New Dragon Gate Inn	Uncredited	Yes	Yes	No	
1992	The Wicked City	No	Yes	Yes	No	
1993	Iron Monkey	No	Yes	Yes	No	
1993	The East Is Red	No	Yes	Yes	No	
1993	Once Upon a Time in China III	Yes	Yes	Yes	No	
1993	Green Snake	Yes	Yes	Yes	No	
1993	Once Upon a Time in China IV	No	Yes	Yes	No	
1994	The Lovers	Yes	Yes	Yes	No	
1994	Once Upon a Time in China V	Yes	Yes	Yes	No	
1995	The Chinese Feast	Yes	Yes	Yes	No	
1995	Love in the Time of Twilight	Yes	Yes	Yes	No	
1995	The Blade	Yes	Yes	Yes	Yes	Also editor and production manager
1996	Tristar	Yes	Yes	Yes	No	
1996	Black Mask	No	Yes	Yes	No	
1997	Double Team	Yes	No	No	No	American and English-language debut
1997	A Chinese Ghost Story: The Tsui Hark Animation	No	Yes	Executive	Yes	Also editor
1998	Knock Off	Yes	No	No	No	
2000	Time and Tide	Yes	Yes	Yes	No	
2001	The Legend of Zu	Yes	Yes	Yes	No	
2002	The Era of Vampires	No	Yes	Yes	No	
2002	Black Mask 2: City of Masks	Yes	No	Yes	No	
2003	Believe It or Not	Yes	No	No	No	Segment of 1:99 Shorts
2004	Xanda	No	Yes	Yes	No	
2005	Seven Swords	Yes	Yes	Yes	No	
2006	The Warrior	No	Yes	Yes	Yes	Also action choreographer
2007	Triangle	Yes (Note: Co-directed with Ringo Lam and Johnnie To)	Yes	Yes	No	
2008	Missing	Yes	Yes	Yes	No	
2008	All About Women	Yes	Yes	Yes	Yes	Also editor
2010	Detective Dee and the Mystery of the Phantom Flame	Yes	No	Yes	No	
2011	Flying Swords of Dragon Gate	Yes	Yes	Yes	No	
2013	Young Detective Dee: Rise of the Sea Dragon	Yes	Yes	Yes	No	
2014	The Taking of Tiger Mountain	Yes	Yes	No	No	
2016	Sword Master	No	Yes	Yes	No	
2017	Journey to the West: The Demons Strike Back	Yes	Yes	Yes	No	
2017	The Thousand Faces of Dunjia	No	Yes	Yes	No	
2018	Detective Dee: The Four Heavenly Kings	Yes	Yes	Yes	No	
2020	Septet: The Story of Hong Kong	Yes	Yes	No	Yes	1 segment, also editor
2021	The Battle at Lake Changjin	Yes	No	Yes	Yes	Also editor
2022	The Battle at Lake Changjin II	Yes	No	Yes	No	
2025	Legends of the Condor Heroes: The Gallants	Yes	Yes	Yes	Yes	Also costume and production designer

==== Producer only ====
Year	Title	Director	Notes
1986	A Better Tomorrow	John Woo	
1987	A Chinese Ghost Story	Ching Siu-tung	
1989	The Killer	John Woo	
1990	A Terracotta Warrior	Ching Siu-tung	
1990	Spygame	David Wu	
1994	Burning Paradise	Ringo Lam	
1996	Shanghai Grand	Poon Man-kit	
1997	Once Upon a Time in China and America	Sammo Hung	
2001	Old Master Q 2001	Herman Yau	
2013	Sheng dan mei gui	Charlie Yeung	
2019	The Climbers	Daniel Lee	

==== Acting roles ====
Year	Title	Role	Notes
1980	Dangerous Encounters of the First Kind	Interpol Officer	Uncredited
1982	Aces Go Places	Ballerina Director	
1982	Yi jiu ling wu de dong tian	Li Shutong	
1983	Zu Warriors from the Magic Mountain	Blue Army soldier	
1983	Aces Go Places 2	FBI agent	
1983	Wo ai Ye Laixiang	Japanese Ambassador	
1984	Shanghai Blues	Pedestrian	
1984	Aces Go Places 3	Police Officer	
1984	Run, Tiger, Run	Grandpa Steak	
1985	Kung Hei Fat Choy	Gold Grabber	
1985	Working Class	Sunny	
1985	Yes, Madam	Panadol	
1986	A Better Tomorrow	Music Judge	
1986	Happy Ghost III	Reincarnation Director	
1987	Final Victory	Big Bo	
1988	The Big Heat	Inspector Yiuming Butt	Uncredited
1988	I Love Maria	Whiskey	
1989	A Better Tomorrow III: Love & Death in Saigon	Police Officer	
1992	The Wicked City	Card player	
1997	A Chinese Ghost Story: The Tsui Hark Animation	Solid Gold (voice)	
2000	Time and Tide	Narrator (voice)	Uncredited
2008	All About Women	Taxi driver	Uncredited
2011	A Simple Life	Director Tsui	Also known as Sister Peach
2011	The Great Magician	Warlord	
2016	The Mermaid	Uncle Rich	Credited as "Ke Xu"
2016	The Bodyguard	Old Man	
2017	Journey to the West: The Demons Strike Back	Theatre employee	

==== Other production credits ====
Year	Title	Director	Notes
1983	All the Wrong Spies	Teddy Robin	Production designer
1986	Righting Wrongs	Corey Yuen	Action choreographer

=== Television ===
Year	Title	Director	Writer	Producer	Notes
1986	Spirit Chaser Aisha	Yes	No	Yes	Considered lost
1995–96	Wong Fei Hung Series	Yes	Yes	Yes	Episodes "The Final Victory" and "The Ideal Century"
2005–06	Seven Swordsmen	No	Yes	Yes	

== Awards and nominations ==
=== Golden Horse Awards ===
Year	Category	Work	Result
1981	Best Director	All the Wrong Clues for the Right Solution	Won
1992	Best Adapted Screenplay	Swordsman II	Nominated
1994	Best Adapted Screenplay	The Lovers	Nominated
1997	Best Adapted Screenplay	A Chinese Ghost Story: The Tsui Hark Animation	Nominated
2005	Best Adapted Screenplay	Seven Swords	Nominated
2015	Best Director	The Taking of Tiger Mountain	Nominated

=== Hong Kong Film Awards ===
Year	Category	Work	Result
1985	Best Film	Shanghai Blues	Nominated
1985	Best Director	Shanghai Blues	Nominated
1987	Best Film	A Better Tomorrow	Won
1987	Best Action Choreography	Righting Wrongs	Nominated
1988	Best Film	A Chinese Ghost Story	Nominated
1988	Best Supporting Actor	Final Victory	Nominated
1990	Best Film	The Killer	Nominated
1992	Best Film	Once Upon a Time in China	Nominated
1992	Best Director	Once Upon a Time in China	Won
1993	Best Film	Once Upon a Time in China II	Nominated
1993	Best Director	Once Upon a Time in China II	Nominated
1995	Best Director	The Lovers	Nominated
2006	Best Film	Seven Swords	Nominated
2006	Best Director	Seven Swords	Nominated
2011	Best Film	Detective Dee and the Mystery of the Phantom Flame	Nominated
2011	Best Director	Detective Dee and the Mystery of the Phantom Flame	Won
2012	Best Film	Flying Swords of Dragon Gate	Nominated
2012	Best Director	Flying Swords of Dragon Gate	Nominated
2016	Best Director	The Taking of Tiger Mountain	Won

== General and cited references ==
- Bordwell, David (2000). Planet Hong Kong: Popular Cinema and the Art of Entertainment. Cambridge, Mass.: Harvard University Press. ISBN 0-674-00214-8.
- Dannen, Fredric, and Barry Long (1997). Hong Kong Babylon: The Insider's Guide to the Hollywood of the East. New York: Miramax. ISBN 0-7868-6267-X.
- Hampton, Howard (July–August 1997). "Once Upon a Time in Hong Kong: Tsui Hark and Ching Siu-tung". Film Comment. pp. 16–19 & 24–27.
- Lau, Joyce Hor-Chung (11 July 2011). "Bringing a Wealth of Cinematic Knowledge to the Screen in 3-D" (subscription required). The New York Times. Archive.
- Morton, Lisa (2001). The Cinema of Tsui Hark. Jefferson, NC: McFarland and Company. ISBN 0-7864-0990-8.
- Teo, Stephen (1997). Hong Kong Cinema: The Extra Dimensions. London: British Film Institute. ISBN 0-85170-514-6.
- Yang, Jeff, and Dina Gan, Terry Hong and the staff of A. Magazine (1997). Eastern Standard Time: A Guide to Asian Influence on American Culture. Boston: Houghton Mifflin. ISBN 0-395-76341-X.
