= List of Hong Kong films of 1987 =

This article lists feature-length Hong Kong films released in 1987.

== Box office ==
The highest-grossing Hong Kong films released in 1987, by domestic box office gross revenue, are as follows:

Highest-grossing films released in 1987
| Rank | Title | Domestic gross |
|---|---|---|
| 1 | Armour of God | HK$35,469,408 |
| 2 | Prison on Fire | HK$31,622,805 |
| 3 | Project A Part II | HK$31,459,916 |
| 4 | It's a Mad, Mad, Mad World | HK$27,141,624 |
| 5 | An Autumn's Tale | HK$25,546,552 |
| 6 | A Better Tomorrow II | HK$22,727,369 |
| 7 | The Happy Bigamist | HK$22,358,928 |
| 8 | Spiritual Love | HK$22,098,617 |
| 9 | The Romancing Star | HK$21,720,626 |
| 10 | Eastern Condors | HK$21,606,063 |

== Releases ==
| Title | Director | Cast | Genre | Notes |
|---|---|---|---|---|
1987
| Amnesty Decree | Clifford Choi Gai Gwong | Nina Li, Cecilia Yip, Melvin Wong | | |
| Angel | Raymond Leung, Tony Leung Siu-hung, Ivan Lai Kai-ming | Moon Lee, Elaine Lui, Yukari Oshima | Action | |
| An Autumn's Tale | Mabel Cheung | Chow Yun-fat, Cherie Chung, Danny Chan | Drama | |
| A Better Tomorrow 2 | John Woo | Chow Yun-fat, Ti Lung, Leslie Cheung | Crime, action | |
| The Big Brother | Tommy Fan | Alex Man, Simon Yam, Emily Chu | | |
| The Big Parade | Chen Kaige | | | |
| Bitter Taste Of Blood | Albert Lai, Kin Kwok | | | |
| Born to Gamble | Wong Jing | Natalis Chan, Joyce Godenzi, Stanley Fung | | |
| Brotherhood | Billy Chan | Ko Chun Hsiung, Chow Yun-fat, Lam Wai | Thriller | |
| Buddha's Lock | Yim Ho | James Wood, Zhang Lutong, Hu Xiaobo | | Chinese-Hong Kong co-production |
| The Child Of Peach | Chan Jun Leung | | | |
| A Chinese Ghost Story | Ching Siu-tung | Leslie Cheung Kwok-wing, Joey Wong | Fantasy, horror, romance | |
| City on Fire | Ringo Lam | Chow Yun-fat, Danny Lee, Suen Yuet | Crime | |
| Double Fixation | Yonfan | Cherie Chung, Jacky Cheung, Wang Xiaofeng | | |
| Eastern Condors | Sammo Hung | Sammo Hung, Yuen Biao, Joyce Godenzi | | |
| Easy Money | Stephen Shin | Michelle Yeoh, George Lam, Kent Cheng | Crime, romance | |
| Evil Cat | Dennis Yu | Lau Kar-Leung, Mark Cheng, Tang Lai-ying | Horror | |
| The Final Test | Lo Kin | Miu Kiu-wai, Simon Yam, Cheung Kwowk-keng | Science fiction | |
| Final Victory | Patrick Tam | Eric Tsang, Loletta Lee, Loletta Lee | Comedy thriller | |
| Flaming Brothers | Joseph Cheung | Alan Tang, Chow Yun-fat, Pat Ha | Crime | |
| The Gang Don't Shoot Straight | Stanley Fung | Derek Yee, May Lo, Stanley Fung | Comedy | |
| Golden Swallow | O Sing Pui | Cherie Chung, Anthony Wong, Richard Ng | | |
| Happy Bigamist | Anthony Chan | Kenny Bee, Anita Mui, Anthony Chan | Comedy, Romance | |
| Happy Go Lucky | Lee Tim-sing | Tony Leung Chiu-Wai, Kara Hui, Lee Tim-sing | | |
| The Haunted Cop Shop | Jeffrey Lau | Jacky Cheung, Ricky Hui | | |
| Heartbeat 100 | Kent Cheng, Lo Kin | Maggie Cheung, Lui Fong, Bonnie Law | Thriller | |
| Killer's Nocturne | | Man Chi Leung, Chin Siu Ho, Patricia Ho | | |
| Lady in Black | Sun Chung | Brigitte Lin, Tony Leung Ka-fai, Phillip Kwok | Thriller | |
| The Lady Assassin | Tony Lou Chun-Ku | Lau Wing, Leanne Lau Suet-Wah, Max Mok, Norman Chui, Yeung Ching-Ching | Historical drama martial arts | |
| The Legend of Wisley | Teddy Robin | Samuel Hui, Ti Lung, Teddy Robin | Adventure | |
| Long Arm of the Law II | Michael Mak | Elvis Tsui, Ben Lam, Yuen Yat-chor | Crime | |
| Magic Story | Lau Wing Kei | Bill Tung, Mars | | |
| Magnificent Warriors | David Chung | Michelle Yeoh, Richard Ng, Derek Yee | Action, adventure | |
| Mr. Handsome | David Chiang | Richard Ng, Bill Tung, Carol Cheng, Lydia Shum | Comedy | |
| Mr. Vampire III | Ricky Lau | Richard Ng, Lui Fong, Lam Ching-ying | Horror, comedy | |
| My Cousin the Ghost | Wu Ma | Kenny Bee, Richard Ng, Wan Wan Si, Wu Ma, Mang Hoi | Comedy | |
| People's Hero | Derek Yee | Ti Lung, Tony Leung Chiu-Wai, Tony Leung Ka-fai, Elaine Jin, Paul Chun, Bowie Lam | Crime, drama | |
| Porky's Meatballs | Clifton Ko | Loletta Lee, Nadia Chan, Russell Wong | Comedy | |
| Princess Fragrance | Ann Hui | Zhang Duofu, Chang Dashi, Liu Jia, Aiyinuo | Action | |
| Prison on Fire | Ringo Lam | Chow Yun-fat, Tony Leung Ka-Fai, Roy Cheung | Action, drama | |
| Project A Part II | Jackie Chan | Jackie Chan, Maggie Cheung, Rosamund Kwan | Adventure | |
| Promising Young Boy | Ng Kwok Hao | Collin Chou, Stanley Fung | Action | |
| Reincarnation | Jamie Luk | Kenny Bee, Cecilia Yip, Julia Nickson | | |
| Return of the Demon | Wong Ying | Charlie Cho, Shing Fui On, Dick Wei | Horror, comedy | |
| Rich and Famous | Taylor Wong | Chow Yun-fat, Andy Lau, Alex Man | Crime | |
| Road Warriors | Danny Lee Sau-Yin | Danny Lee Sau-Yin, Jamie Luk Kim-Ming, Ken Lo Wai-Kwong, Billy Ching Sau-Yat, Shing Fui-On, Jessica Chow Bo-San, Sally Kwok | Crime, Bullet Ballet | |
| The Romance of Book and Sword | Ann Hui | Zhang Duofu, Chang Dashi, Liu Jia | Action | |
| The Romancing Star | Wong Jing | Chow Yun-fat, Maggie Cheung, Eric Tsang | Comedy | |
| Scared Stiff | Lau Kar-wing | Eric Tsang, Chow Yun-fat, Michael Miu | | |
| Sister Cupid | Guy Lai | Carol Cheng, Jackie Cheung, Maggie Cheung | | |
| Sworn Brothers | David Lai | Andy Lau, Cheung Kwok Keung | Crime | |
| The Thirty Million Rush | Karl Maka | Karl Maka, Brigitte Lin, Paula Tsui, Eric Tsang, Angile Leung, Mark Cheng, Wong Ching, Lau Kar-leung, John Woo, Wong Jing | Action / Comedy | |
| To Err is Humane | Alfred Cheung | Sammo Hung, Kenny Bee, Joey Wong, Anthony Chan, Wu Ma | Action / Crime | |
| Tragic Hero | Taylor Wong | Andy Lau, Chow Yun-fat, Alex Man, Danny Lee, Carina Lau, Ko Chun Hsiung, Pauline Wong | Action | |
| Trouble Couples | Eric Tsang | Eric Tsang, Anita Mui | Comedy / Drama | |
| The Wrong Couples | David Chiang | Josephine Siao, Richard Ng, Paul Chun | Drama | |
| You OK, I'm OK! | Fung Sai Wai | Cheung Kwok Keung, May Lo, Kent Tong, Carrie Ng, Ku Feng | Drama | |
| You're My Destiny | Eric Tsang | Alan Tam, Hayami Yu, Teddy Robin, Natalis Chan, Albert Au | Romantic comedy | |

== See also ==
- 1987 in Hong Kong
