= List of Hong Kong films of 1990 =

This article lists feature-length Hong Kong films released in 1990.

== Box office ==
The highest-grossing Hong Kong films released in 1990, by domestic box office gross revenue, are as follows:

Highest-grossing films released in 1990
Rank	Title	Domestic gross
1	All for the Winner	HK$41,326,156
2	God of Gamblers II	HK$40,420,842
3	Front Page	HK$26,358,184
4	Heart Into Hearts	HK$23,275,483
5	A Terra-Cotta Warrior	HK$21,038,612
6	A Chinese Ghost Story II	HK$20,784,824
7	Her Fatal Ways	HK$20,476,919
8	The Fun, the Luck & the Tycoon	HK$20,292,057
9	No Risk, No Gain	HK$19,521,606
10	When Fortune Smiles	HK$18,910,729

== Releases ==
Title	Director	Cast	Genre	Notes
1990
A Lang A Lang	Yip Hing Fai			
Against All	Andrew Lau	Danny Lee, Nick Cheung, K. K. Lam King-kong		
All for the Winner	Corey Yuen, Jeff Lau Chun-wai	Stephen Chow, Ng Man Tat, Cheung Man	Comedy, action	
Angel Mission	Godfrey Ho	Ronald Lee, Yukari Oshima		
B B 30	Godfrey Ho Chi Keung			
Best Friend Of The Cops	Wong Wah Kai	Alex Man, Jacky Cheung, Sin Woon Ching	Crime comedy	
The Big Score	Wong Jing	Danny Lee, Lung Fong, Anthony Wong	Crime comedy	
A Bite Of Love	Stephen Shin	George Lam, Rosamund Kwan, Man Tsui	Comedy	
Blood Stained Tradewind	Chor Yuen	Alex Fong, Waise Lee, Carrie Ng, Idy Chan		
Bullet in the Head	John Woo	Tony Leung Chiu-Wai, Jacky Cheung, Simon Yam	Action	
A Chinese Ghost Story II	Ching Siu Tung	Leslie Cheung, Joey Wong	Fantasy, horror	
Curry and Pepper	Blackie Ko	Jacky Cheung, Stephen Chow	Comedy	
Days of Being Wild	Wong Kar-wai	Leslie Cheung, Andy Lau, Maggie Cheung	Drama	
Demoness from Thousand Years	Jeng Wing-Chiu	Joey Wong, Jacky Cheung, Sin-hung Tam	Horror	
Dragon in Jail	Kent Cheng	Andy Lau, Kenny Ho, Gigi Lai	Crime	
The Dragon from Russia	Clarence Fok Yiu-leung	Sam Hui, Maggie Cheung, Nina Li Chi	Crime	
Forsaken Cop	Henry Fong	Alex Fong, Michael Miu, Mark Cheng		
The Fortune Code	Kent Cheng	Sammo Hung, Andy Lau, Alan Tam		
Gangland Odyssey	Michael Chan	Andy Lau, Alex Man, Yiu Wai		
God of Gamblers II	Wong Jing	Andy Lau, Stephen Chow, Charles Heung		
Happy Ghost 4	Clifton Ko	Raymond Wong, Pauline Yeung. Tommy Wong		
Hearts Into Hearts	Stephen Shin	George Lam, Carol Cheng, Maggie Cheung		
In the Line of Duty 5: Middle Man	Cha Chuen-yee	Cynthia Khan, David Wu, Elvina Kong Yan-yin	Action	
Kawashima Yoshiko	Eddie Fong	Anita Mui, Andy Lau, Patrick Tse		
Kung Fu VS Acrobatic	Taylor Wong	Andy Lau, Natalis Chan, Joey Wong	Comedy fantasy	
Look Out, Officer!	Lau Shut Yue	Stephen Chow, Bill Tung, Stanley Fung	Horror comedy	
Love Is Love	Tommy Leung	Stephen Chow, Sandra Ng, Shing Fui-On		
Lung Fung Restaurant	Poon Man-kit	Max Mok, Stephen Chow, Ellen Chan	Crime	
Magic Cop	Stephen Tung	Lam Ching-ying, Wilson Lam, Miu Kiu-wai		
A Moment of Romance	Benny Chan	Andy Lau, Jacklyn Wu, Tommy Wong		
My Hero	Bryan Leung	Stephen Chow, Wilson Lam, Ann Bridgewater		
Never Say Regret	Lau Kwok Ho	Max Mok, Yukari Oshima, Kara Hui		
No Risk, No Gain	Jimmy Heung, Taylor Wong	Alan Tam, Andy Lau, Natalis Chan		
No Way Back	King Lee	Max Mok		
The Outlaw Brothers	Frankie Chan	Frankie Chan, Max Mok, Yukari Oshima, Michael Miu		
Pantyhose Hero	Sammo Hung	Sammo Hung, Alan Tam, Jeff Lau		
Saga of the Phoenix	Nam Nai-choi	Yuen Biao, Gloria Yip, Loletta Lee	Adventure, fantasy	
Shanghai Shanghai	Teddy Robin	Sammo Hung, Yuen Biao, George Lam		
She Shoots Straight	Corey Yuen	Sammo Hung, Joyce Godenzi, Tony Leung Kar-Fai	Action	
Skinny Tiger, Fatty Dragon	Lau Kar-wing	Sammo Hung, Karl Maka, Lau Kar-wing, Carrie Ng Ka-lai	Action, comedy	
Song of the Exile	Ann Hui	Maggie Cheung, Lee Chi-Hung, Waise Lee	Drama	
Story of Kennedy Town	Wu Ma	Waise Lee, Aaron Kwok, Mark Cheng		
Sunshine Friends	David Wu	Eric Tsang, Andrew Lam, Liu Wai-hung		
The Swordsman	King Hu	Sam Hui, Cecilia Yip, Jacky Cheung		
Teenage Mutant Ninja Turtles	Steve Barron	Judith Hoag, Elias Koteas	Superhero action comedy	
That's Money	Benny Wong			
Tiger Cage 2	Yuen Woo Ping	Donnie Yen, Rosamund Kwan, David Wu	Action	
Triad Story	Shum Wai	Stephen Chow, Ng Man-tat, Wu Ma	Crime	
Undeclared War	Ringo Lam	Danny Lee, Olivia Hussey, Peter Lapis		
Unmatchable Match	Parkman Wong	Stephen Chow, Michael Chan, Vivian Chow	Comedy, action, crime, drama	
When Fortune Smiles	Anthony Chan	Stephen Chow, Sandra Ng, Anthony Wong Chau-sang	Comedy	
