= 25th Golden Horse Awards =

Award ceremony for Chinese-language films of 1987 and 1988

- Date: November 5, 1988
- Site: Chung Hwa Sports Stadium, Taipei, Taiwan
- Hosted by: Sylvia Chang and David Tao
- Organized by: Taipei Golden Horse Film Festival Executive Committee

Highlights
- Best Feature Film: Painted Faces
- Best Director: Alex Law; Painted Faces
- Best Actor: Alex Man; Gangland Odyssey
- Best Actress: Carol Cheng; Moon, Star & Sun
- Most awards: Painted Faces (7)
- Most nominations: Painted Faces (9)

Television in Taiwan
- Channel: TTV

The 25th Golden Horse Awards (Mandarin:第25屆金馬獎) took place on November 5, 1988, at the Chung Hwa Sports Stadium in Taipei, Taiwan.

== Winners and nominees ==
Winners are listed first and highlighted in boldface.

| **Best Feature Film**: **Painted Faces**; Love in a Fallen City; People Between Two China; When the Ocean is Blue; Wonder Women; Police Story 2 | **Best Documentary Film**: **Evening Drums and Morning Bells**; 水里陶; 深山猶有讀書聲; 矮人祭之歌; Chiu Lung Kou |
| **Best Director**: **Alex Law — Painted Faces**; Ann Hui — Starry is the Night; Wong Kar-wai — As Tears Go By | **Best Director for a Documentary Film**: **Lin Tsuo-yung — 深山猶有讀書聲**; Liu Kuo-bin — 水里陶; Yang Wen-kan — Evening Drums and Morning Bells |
| **Best Leading Actor**: **Alex Man — Gangland Odyssey**; Sammo Hung — Painted Faces; Ti Lung — People's Hero | **Best Leading Actress**: **Carol Cheng — Moon, Star & Sun**; Chiang Hsia — People Between Two China; Cora Miao — Love in a Fallen City |
| **Best Supporting Actor**: **Stephen Chow — Final Justice**; Lam Ching-ying — Painted Faces; Chin Tu — The Green Trees | **Best Supporting Actress**: **Wang Lai — People Between Two China**; Elaine Jin — People's Hero; Chang Ying-chen — Rouge of the North |
**Special Award**: **The Digger**
