= Golden Swallow =

Golden Swallow may refer to:

- Golden swallow (bird)
- Golden Swallow (1968 film), a 1968 film directed by Chang Cheh
- Golden Swallow, a 1987 film directed by O Sing-pui; see List of Hong Kong films of 1987
