= Stephen Shiu =

Stephen Shiu Yeuk-yuen
- 蕭若元
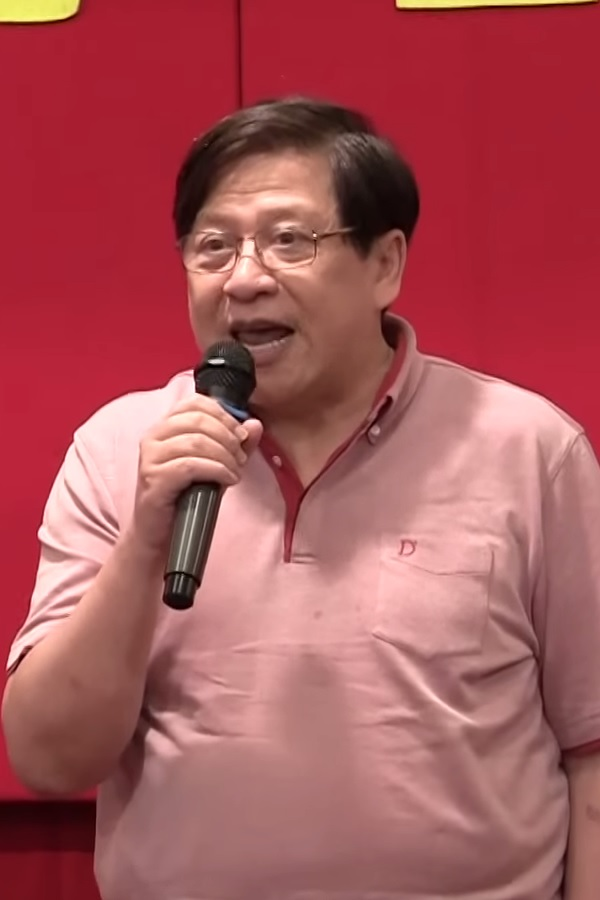
- Born: 22 July 1949 (age 77); British Hong Kong
- Education: University of Hong Kong
- Occupations: Media personality, businessperson, film producer, screenwriter, news presenter, pundit
- Known for: Hong Kong Reporter memehk.com
- Website: www.patreon.com/mrshiu/

Stephen Shiu
- Traditional Chinese: 蕭若元
Transcriptions
Standard Mandarin
- Hanyu Pinyin: Xiāo Ruòyuán
Yue: Cantonese
- Yale Romanization: Sīu Yeuhk yùhn
- Jyutping: Siu1 Joek6 jyun4

Stephen Shiu (born 22 July 1949) is a Taiwan-based Hong Kong media personality, businessperson, film producer, screenwriter, news presenter, and pundit. He founded Hong Kong Reporter in 2004, an internet radio station focused on live talk radio broadcasting. In 2013 he founded memehk.com, a multimedia news site, after Hong Kong Reporter was closed.

== Early life ==
Born to a middle-class family in Hong Kong, Shiu is the third of six children. His father Pak-yin Shiu was an overseas Chinese construction materials businessman. Shiu studied at St. Paul's College, Hong Kong and was classmates with Tsang Tak-sing, former Secretary for Home Affairs. He studied history at the University of Hong Kong following his A-levels. He began studying for a master's degree in History but dropped out.

== Career ==
In 1987, Shiu began collaborating with Wong Yuk-long in creating popular comics such as Zui Quan (醉拳) and Oriental Heroes (龍虎門), on which films Drunken Master and Dragon Tiger Gate were based, respectively.

In 2003 Shiu acquired Rainbow International Ltd (彩虹國際) and changed its name to 變靚D控股 Ltd, a body slimming company.

He founded Hong Kong Reporter (香港人網) in 2004. In recent years, it became a podium for radical ideas and helped garner support for political party People Power, including its protests and activities.

Shiu is a screenwriter and film producer whose works include 1992 Hong Kong Film Awards winner To Be Number One. After the handover, Shiu was a co-host on a Metro Radio current affairs programme before starting up his own stations online.

In 2013 Shiu announced that he is to launch a new radio station, weeks after having closed one of Hong Kong's biggest pro-democracy radio stations. Memehk.com was inaugurated shortly after.

== Political activism ==
Shiu is an outspoken supporter of the Occupy Central with Love and Peace group, a pro-democracy, civil rights advocacy group that organised the 2014 Hong Kong protests.

In May 2012 he announced that he would close Hong Kong Reporter if People Power failed to win at least 3 seats in the city's Legislative Council. In an interview he stated that 'Hong Kong is in grave danger', and that the council needed enough opposition voices to counter Chief Executive-elect Leung Chun-ying. At a People Power hustings in June 2012 he declared his candidacy for the Hong Kong Island geographical constituency.

On 22 March 2013 he announced in his own radio programme that Hong Kong Reporter would cease production, citing his 'disappointment' in many of his former political allies and partners. He made it clear that he has withdrawn support for People Power, and would not support any other political party from that day forth. He founded the purportedly politically unaffiliated memehk.com as its replacement on 1 June 2013.

On 24 November 2014, one day after delivering a speech to the crowd at the 2014 Hong Kong protests, Shiu's vehicle was forcibly stopped by two cars, causing damage to his vehicle. He was not injured as a result of the incident. He believed the attack was in retaliation to his comments and news reports by his own outlet memehk.com, stating 'only criminal gangs are capable of [such acts]'.

== Controversy ==
In 2003 Shiu was involved in a pyramid scheme. The company he co-created was accused of selling electronic currency to its customers, who later discovered they were unable to purchase goods at market value with said currency.

On 18 July 2011, Shiu announced his intention to acquire Hong Kong Golden Forum, a popular internet forum, and to merge it with Hong Kong Reporter. This was met with vocal opposition from the forum's users, some of whom created a number of parodies with profanities.

During the 2019–20 Hong Kong protests, as seen in video footage widely shared online, a man was doused in flammable liquid and set on fire by a protester in Ma On Shan. In response, Shui made misleading comments to argue that the video was faked, but his statement was quickly debunked as false afterwards. The Hong Kong Hospital Authority and the Hong Kong Police Force both confirmed that the incident had happened and that the victim remained in a critical condition. Shui has since retracted his comments and issued an apology.

== Filmography ==
=== Producer ===
- Long Arm of the Law II (1987)
- The Truth (1988)
- The Greatest Lover (1988)
- Moon, Star, Sun (1988)
- Long Arm of the Law Part 3 (1989)
- The Iceman Cometh (1989)
- The Truth – Final Episode (1989)
- Sentenced to Hang (1989)
- Underground Express (1990)
- Sex and Zen (1991)
- To Be Number One (1991)
- It's Now or Never (1992)
- King of Beggars (1992)
- Sisters Outlaw (1992)
- Royal Tramp (1992)
- Royal Tramp II (1992)
- Arrest the Restless (1992)
- Invincible (1992)
- Handsome Siblings (1992)
- The Wrong Bedfellow (1993)
- The Formula (1993)
- The Secret File (1993)
- Whores from the North (1993)
- Manhunt Across the Border (1993)
- Lord of East China Sea (1993)
- Black Panther (1993)
- Fight Back to School III (1993)
- Flirting Scholar (1993)
- The Sword of Many Loves (1993)
- Lord of East China Sea II (1993)
- Hero of Hong Kong 1949 (1993)
- 3D Sex and Zen: Extreme Ecstasy (2011)
- Sex and Zen II: 4D Sexecution (2012)

=== Writer ===
- Rolls, Rolls, I Love You (1982)
- Winner Takes All? (1984)
- Midnight Girls (1986)
- Spiritual Love (1987)
- Rich and Famous (1987)
- Tragic Hero (1987)
- The Greatest Lover (1988)
- Moon, Star, Sun (1988)
- The Truth (1988)
- Midnight Whispers (1988)
- Long Arm of the Law III (1989)
- The Iceman Cometh (1989)
- The Truth – Final Episode (1989)
- Sentenced to Hang (1989)
- Underground Express (1990)
- To Be Number One (1991)
- It's Now or Never (1992)
- Man of the Times (1993)
- Lord of East China Sea (1993)
- The Sword of Many Lovers (1993)
- Lord of East China Sea II (1993)
- Hero of Hong Kong 1949 (1993)
- 3D Sex and Zen: Extreme Ecstasy (2011)
- Sex and Zen II: 4D Sexecution (2012)

=== Actor ===
- On the Wrong Track (1983)

=== Executive producer ===
- Long Arm of the Law II (1987)
- The Greatest Lover (1988)

== Personal life ==
He was in a relationship with Pamela Peck, Mei-lai Kok (sister of director Vincent Kok) and Deanie Ip. Currently he is married to Lai-mei Hau, and they have a son and three daughters.
