= The Truth (1988 film) =

1988 Hong Kong film by Taylor Wong

- DVD cover
- Traditional Chinese: 法內情
- Simplified Chinese: 法内情
- Hanyu Pinyin: Fǎ Nèi Qíng
- Jyutping: Faat3 Noi6 Cing4
- Directed by: Taylor Wong
- Written by: Stephen Shiu; Taylor Mak
- Produced by: Stephen Shiu; Johnny Mak
- Starring: Andy Lau; Deanie Ip; Kathy Chow; Lau Siu Ming; Paul Chun
- Cinematography: Herman Yau
- Edited by: Poon Hung
- Music by: Joseph Chan
- Production companies: Movie Impact; Johnny Mak Production
- Release date: 28 April 1988
- Running time: 116 minutes
- Country: Hong Kong
- Language: Cantonese
- Box office: HK$18,831,625

The Truth is a 1988 Hong Kong trial film directed by Taylor Wong and starring Andy Lau and Deanie Ip. This film is a sequel to the 1985 film The Unwritten Law. It is followed by another sequel, The Truth – Final Episode, which was released the following year and is the last film of the series.

== Plot ==
Raymond Lau (Andy Lau) is a young lawyer who grew up in an orphanage. He had an anonymous “uncle” who had always given him extra money that was used for Raymond's extra schooling. Raymond had fought a lawsuit for a prostitute named Lau Wai Lan (Deanie Ip). He does not know that Wai Lan is actually his mother.

Lau Wai Lan still lives a harsh life as a prostitute, often being extorted by CID officers. Unfortunately, her son's birth certificate falls into the hands of a corrupt police officer, Wong Fat (Kirk Wong), who extorts a large sum of money from Wai Lan. They compose a written agreement on the sum of money. She is forced to somehow raise money so she decides to cheat in a mahjong game, and is caught and beaten. With help from her prostitute sisters, they finally raise the money, however, Wong Fat has gone back on his word, and has amended the written contract. He has added an extra zero, adding to the sum of money that Wai Lan needed to turn over to him. Out of desperation, Wai Lan plots to kill Wong Fat. She successfully kills him but is caught by another prostitute that was with him earlier in the night. Wai Lan was arrested and pending trial.

When Sister Mary, of the orphanage, becomes aware of the matter, she finds Raymond and asks him to again defend Wai Lan.

Wai Lan does not want to let her son know about their relationship. She decides she would rather kill herself than have her lawyer son know that his mother was a prostitute. She survives her suicide attempt. In the hospital, Sister Mary could not help but to tell Raymond the secret, telling him Wai Lan is the unknown “uncle” who paid for his studies abroad, and that she is actually his mother. Raymond visits Wai Lan in the hospital and embrace, for the first time, as mother and son.

Raymond has had friction with the judge and prosecutor (Paul Chun), and with profound grievances, it was a disadvantage for him to defend his mother. For the sake of his mother, Raymond bribed witnesses and his acts of instigating false statements was brought to light and he is on the verge of facing penalties for knowingly violating the law. Raymond tells of his real identity in court, tells the greatness of his mother Wai Lan, which the final jury agreed to Wai Lan not guilty for murder, while accusing the judge for his bad attitude and bring unjust, saying that if the judge can not give a lighter sentence, he clearly has personality problems. Finally, the judge ruled out that Wai Lan is sent to three years incarceration, suspended for five years, and was released immediately.

== Cast ==
- Andy Lau as Raymond Lau
- Deanie Ip as Lau Wai Lan
- Kathy Chow as Eve
- Lau Siu Ming as Old Kwan
- Paul Chun as Prosecutor Chun
- Wai Kei Shun as Eve's father
- Shing Fui-On as Madly
- Kirk Wong as Wong Fat
- Ng Man Ling
- Sita Yeung
- Ng Hoi Tin as Judge
- Chan Ging
- Lee Ying Kit as Inspector Chan
- Mantic Yiu
- Tsang Cho Lam as Ping's father
- Wong Hung as Madly's thug
- Ho Chi Moon as Juror

== Box office ==
The film grossed HK$18,831,625 at the Hong Kong box office in its theatrical run from 28 April to 25 May 1988 in Hong Kong.
