= Raymond Lau =

Raymond Lau or Ray Lau may refer to:

- Raymond Lau, a developer of StuffIt, a computer software
- Raymond Lau, a character of The Unwritten Law (film), portrayed by Andy Lau
- Lau Kong-wah, a Hong Kong politician, also called Ray Lau
