= Peter Yang =

Hong Kong film actor, producer and director (1935–2022)

- Born: Yang Qun; 25 September 1935; Harbin, Manchuria, Japan
- Died: 24 October 2022 (aged 87); Cerritos, California, U.S.
- Occupations: Actor; director; producer; martial artist
- Years active: 1957–2001
- Spouse: Florence Fung-Chi
- Children: 2

Peter Yang Kwan, also known as Yang Qun (Chinese: 楊群; 25 September 1935 – 24 October 2022), was a Hong Kong martial artist film actor, film producer and director, best known for his appearances in Hong Kong action cinema of the 1970s and 1980s.

Yang starred in the 1969 film King of Kings.

== Biography ==
Yang was born in 1935 in Harbin, Manchuria. He left Harbin at the age of 6 and went to Beijing and studied in Yu Ying Secondary School until the age of 12. He then fled to Shanghai with his family because of the Chinese Civil War for 8 months. The family finally sought refuge in Taiwan after their brief stay in Shanghai.

In Taiwan, he studied in a practical Mandarin School for a year in Taipei before again relocating with his family in Hong Kong and studied in the Yin Nan Middle School.

During these years, his family's financial status plummeted significantly. In order to help with his family's situation, Yang took up odd jobs. He was cast in a few films as an extra and did this for several years. He also worked in radio stations and dubbed for Japanese films in Mandarin. He also worked as an auxiliary police officer in Hong Kong.

Yang maintained his multifaceted life until 1960 when he landed a role as a leading actor in "Qin Xiang Lian".

== Filmography ==
=== Films ===
- Our Sister Hedy (1957) - David
- Mambo Girl (1957) - Student
- Golden Lotus (1957) - Hsiao Li
- Scarlet Doll (1958) - Hua Ji Yu
- Jade-Green Lake (1958) - Actor
- The Witch-Girl (1961) - He Yueer
- Mung Li Chuen (1963) - Actor
- The Adulteress (1963) - Actor
- The Story of Qin Xianglian (1964) - Actor
- Dodder Flower (1965) - Actor
- Commander Underground (1967) - Actor
- The Knight of Old Cathay (1968) - Actor
- Greatest Fight (1968) - Actor
- Superior Darter (1969) - Actor
- Son of Swordsman (1969) - Actor
- King of Kings (1969) - Actor
- You, Me and Him (1970) - Actor
- Way Ching Killer the Dragon (1970) - Actor
- The Lost Spring (1970) - Actor
- From the Highway (1970) - Actor
- Four Moods (1970) - Actor
- Dusk (1970) - Actor
- You Can't Tell Him (1971) - Actor
- The Tsu Hong Wu (1971) - Actor
- Legends of Cheating (1971) - Actor
- The Ammunition Hunters (1971) - Actor
- The Escape (1972) - Actor, Director, Presenter
- The Avenger (1972) - Actor
- Tales of Larceny (1973) - Actor
- Morning Goodbye (1973) - Actor
- Illicit Desire (1973) - Actor
- Cheat to Cheat (1973) - Actor
- Lady Blood Boxer (1974) - Actor
- The Golden Lotus (1974) - Actor
- Blood Reincarnation (1974) - Actor
- My Wacky, Wacky World (1975) - Actor (cameo)
- Confession of a Concubine (1975) - Actor
- I Want More (1976) - Actor, Director
- 800 Heroes (1976) - Actor; film about the defense of Sihang Warehouse
- Old Soldiers Never Die (1978) - Actor, Director, Producer
- Enter the Fat Dragon (1978) - Actor, Planning
- The Battle of Ku-ning-tou (1979) - Actor
- The Shell Game (1980) - Actor
- Encore (1980) - Actor
- Man on the Brink (1981) - Producer
- The Gambler's Duel (1981) - Actor
- Big Boss (also known as Ding Ye) (1981) - Actor
- Lily Under the Gun (1982) - Actor
- First Time (1983) - Actor, Manager, Producer
- Twinkle, Twinkle Lucky Stars (1985)
- The Protector (1985) - Actor
- Cop of the Town (1985) - Producer
- Cop Busters (1985) - Actor
- Parking Service (1986) - Actor
- Angel (1987) - Actor
- Tragic Hero (1987) - Actor
- Sworn Brothers (1987) - Actor
- Rich and Famous (1987) - Actor
- Border Line Story (1988) - Actor
- Point of No Return (1990) - Actor
- Never Say Regret (1990) - Actor
- My Hero (1990) - Actor
- The Plot (1991) - Actor
- The Godfather's Daughter Mafia Blues (1991) - Actor
- Fantasy Romance (1991) - Producer
- Gambling Soul (1992) - Actor
- Beauty Investigator (1992) - Actor
- Run for Life - Ladies from China - (1993) Actor
- Possessed (1994) - Actor
- Life Is A Miracle (2001) - Actor

== Personal life ==
Yang was married to Florence Fung-Chi. They had a son and a daughter.
