= Stars and Roses =

1989 Hong Kong film by Taylor Wong

- DVD cover
- Traditional Chinese: 愛人同志
- Simplified Chinese: 爱人同志
- Hanyu Pinyin: Ài Rén Tóng Zhì
- Jyutping: Ngoi3 Jan4 Tung4 Zi3
- Directed by: Taylor Wong
- Screenplay by: Ko Chung Wai
- Produced by: Yuen Kam Lun
- Starring: Andy Lau; Cherie Chung
- Cinematography: Herman Yau; Puccini Yu
- Edited by: A Chik; Chung Chik
- Music by: Lo Tayu; Richard Lo
- Production company: Chun Sing Films
- Distributed by: Chun Sing Films
- Release date: 21 December 1989
- Running time: 100 minutes
- Country: Hong Kong
- Languages: Cantonese; Vietnamese; Mandarin
- Box office: HK$13,098,194

Stars and Roses (orig. Ai ren tong zhi) is a 1989 Hong Kong drama film directed by Taylor Wong and starring Andy Lau as a photo journalist from Hong Kong and Cherie Chung as a Vietnamese translator.

== Plot ==
Lau Kai Cho (Andy Lau) travels to Vietnam for a story. Once in Vietnam, he briefly meets Yuen Hung (Cherie Chung), a translator and is involved in an accident after crashing a motorised rickshaw. The courts hand him a prison sentence in a strict prison where he is subject to a number of horrible punishments.

While in prison, he meets Yuen's brother, upon his release, Lau and Yuen become more friendly until Lau is imprisoned again for anti-government activity. Sentenced to 3 years he plots to escape from prison taking Yuen Hung's brother with him.

== Cast ==
- Andy Lau as Lau Kai Cho
- Cherie Chung as Yuen Hung
- Sheila Chan as Lawyer Chan
- Shing Fui-On as Chen Fei Ehn
- Hung San-Nam
- Lam Wai as Hung's boyfriend
- Lau Chun-Fai
- Leung Ming
- Lung Ming-Yan as Nam
- Wai Gei-Shun

== Production ==
The film was shot in Hong Kong and Vietnam.
