= Triads: The Inside Story =

1989 Hong Kong film by Taylor Wong

- Film poster
- Traditional Chinese: 我在黑社會的日子
- Simplified Chinese: 我在黑社会的日子
- Hanyu Pinyin: Wǒ Zài Hēi Shè Huì De Rì Zi
- Jyutping: Ngo5 Zoi6 Hak1 Se2 Weoi5 Dik1 Jat6 Zi2
- Directed by: Taylor Wong
- Screenplay by: Nam Yin
- Story by: Ko Chun-wai
- Produced by: Richard Cheung
- Starring: Chow Yun-fat; Roy Cheung; Michael Chan; Shing Fui-On
- Cinematography: Herman Yau
- Edited by: A Chik; Ma Chung-yiu
- Music by: Lo Tayu; Richard Lo
- Production company: Cinema City
- Distributed by: Cinema City
- Release date: 4 August 1989
- Running time: 106 minutes
- Country: Hong Kong
- Language: Cantonese
- Box office: HK$14,038,799

Triads: The Inside Story is a 1989 Hong Kong crime drama film directed by Taylor Wong and starring Chow Yun-fat and Roy Cheung.

== Plot ==
Lee Man-ho (Chow Yun-fat) is the son of Uncle Kwan (Tien Feng), the leader of the Hung Hing Gang. Ho was sent to the United States during his childhood to live a stable life where he established a family. Meanwhile, Uncle Kwan is ambushed and killed during a gang fight led by rival leader Shrimp (Kevin Wang). Ho returns to Hong Kong for his father's funeral. Upon his arrival, he is elected to be his father's successor as the leader of the Hung Hing Gang. Ho knows little of the culture and the criminal underworld, as Yeung Kong (Roy Cheung), often chastising Ho due to this fact. Kong also does not get along with Tse Shing (Michael Chan), another respected member. Kong and Shing get into a fight during a banquet. However due to Ho's intervention, they chose to maintain the harmony of the gang. Subsequently all members of Hung Hing Gang became loyal to Ho because Ho was always kind to them, valuing a sense of brotherhood.

Later in the film, during a fight, the members of the Hung Hing gang capture Coffin Rope (Lung Ming-yan), the head of a rival triad. Ho intends to kill the latter, but due to his lenient personality, Ho has Coffin Rope's eyebrows shaved off. Seeing as an opportunity for a counterattack, he colludes with Boss Chow (Pau Hon-lam), a wealthy businessman, then uses Kong and Shing's rivalry to his advantages. Coffin Rope sends his men to kill Shing's family and then frames Kong, worsening the relationship within the Hung Hing gang. He also puts cocaine in Kong's car and informs the police. Ho decides to save Kong and gets rid of Coffin Rope's triad. However, the police arrive and take Kong into custody. Before his arrest, Kong tells Ho that he is a kind leader, but not a good triad member.

Ho returns to the Hung Hing office and sets it on fire, putting an end to the triad society. Apologizing to his father and hoping that he will understand his actions, Ho returns to a normal life in America with his family.

== Cast ==
- Chow Yun-fat as Lee Man-ho, the son of Hung Hing Gang leader Uncle Kwan. He is forced to take up the mantle, and is popular amongst his peers. He later returns to the US alongside his family and Shing.
- Roy Cheung as Yeung Kong, a Hung Hing member and son of Uncle Ping. He is framed due to Coffin Rope planting cocaine in his car.
- Michael Chan as Tse Shing, a Hung Hing member. He leaves with Ho to go to the US at the end of the film.
- Connie Mak as Kuen, Tse Shing's wife. She is killed by Coffin Rope's men.
- Tien Feng as Uncle Kwan, the head of the Hung Hing Gang and Ho's father. He is killed and ambushed by the rival gang when a deal goes wrong.
- Kenneth Tsang as Chan Tin-lok, a superintendent at the Organised Crime and Triad Bureau.
- Sit Chi-lun as Jenny, Ho's wife. She returns with her husband to the US at the end of the film.
- Shing Fui-On as Crazy Keung / Mad Keung, a Hung Hing member. He dies due to an accidental scuffle with Kong after a misunderstanding.
- Lam Kau as Uncle Ping, a triad member and father of Yeung Kong.
- Lung Ming-yan as Coffin Rope, a rival triad leader who shares bad blood with the Hung Hing gang. He is run over by Ho's car when he tries to escape
- Jeffrey Lam as Uncle Bill, a Hung Hing member.
- Kelvin Wong as Shrimp, a rival triad leader and mastermind behind Kwan's death. He is run over by Ho's car when he tries to escape.
- Karel Wong as Shrimp's lieutenant, and was present during Kwan's ambush. He is killed by Shing during a deal.
- Joey Leung as Tak, a student who gets constantly bullied. He is taken in by Kong and inducted into Hung Hing.
- Pau Hon-lam as Chow Sai Lun, a rich businessman. He is run over by Ho's car when he tries to escape.
- Lam Hung
- Sunny Yam
- Robert Zajac as Senior Police Officer
- Robin Shou as Coffin's lieutenant
- Steve Mak as Bad Breath Chuen
- Chow Kong as Tsuen
- Leung Siu-chung as Uncle Kwan's lieutenant
- Cheung Chi-hung
- Wong Wai
- Fan Cheun-hing
- Cheung Chi-ying
- Tou Tam-sam
- Koo Jing-kwong
- Chung Chi-kwong
- Chung Ching-ming
- Mau Chai
- Chow Siu-tam
- Wong Kwok-wai
- Fei Chau
- Robin Shou as one of Coffin Rope's men. He gets captured and is thrown off a building to his death.
- Cheung Kwok-leung
- Chan Ming as Maddy
- Alex Ng as Ho's driver at pier
- Wan Seung-lam as Coffin's gangsters at pier
- Chang Sing-kwong as Coffin's gangsters at pier
- Johnny Cheung as Shrimp's gangster
- James Ha as Kong's man
- Tam Wai-man
- Lam Chi-tai

== Theme song ==
- Shifting Sand Revolving in the Air (飛砂風中轉)
  - Composer: Lo Tayu
  - Lyricist: Richard Lam
  - Singer: Chow Yun-fat

== Reception ==
Mike Fury of Hong Kong Cinemagic gave the film a positive review praising the story being "far more dramatic and character driven rather than being reliant on overuse of action" and containing "a large number of references and cultural and historical traditions of the society, which was in fact quite rare for a film at this time" which stands out among other films in the same genre. Fury also praised the performances of Chow Yun-fat, Shing Fui-On, Michael Chan and Roy Cheung and praises director Taylor Wong for using "a very simplistic and disconnected method of direction, which, at times, gives the film an almost documentary feel in which the camera simply rolls while men are talking in a room and the audience is virtually eavesdropping."

=== Box office ===
The film grossed HK$14,038,799 at the Hong Kong box office during its theatrical run from 4 to 18 August 1989 in Hong Kong.

== Accolades ==
Accolades
Ceremony	Category	Recipient	Outcome
9th Hong Kong Film Awards	Best Original Film Song	Song: Shifting Sand Revolving in the Air (飛砂風中轉) Composer: Lo Tayu; Lyricist: Richard Lam; Singer: Chow Yun-fat	Nominated

== See also ==
- Chow Yun-fat filmography
- List of Hong Kong Category III films
