= Fantasy Romance =

1991 Hong Kong film by Taylor Wong

- Film poster
- Traditional Chinese: 魔畫情
- Simplified Chinese: 魔画情
- Hanyu Pinyin: Mó Huà Qíng
- Jyutping: Mo1 Waa6 Cing4
- Directed by: Taylor Wong
- Screenplay by: Chan Kiu-ying
- Produced by: Peter Yang
- Starring: Joey Wong; Tony Leung; Deanie Ip; Paul Chun; Willie Fung; Tien Feng; Wong Chi-keung
- Cinematography: Herman Yau
- Edited by: Ma Chung-yiu; A Chik
- Music by: Chan Tik-hong
- Production company: Fung Ming Production
- Distributed by: Golden Princess Amusement
- Release date: 4 April 1991
- Running time: 86 minutes
- Country: Hong Kong
- Language: Cantonese
- Box office: HK$1,937,025

Fantasy Romance is a 1991 Hong Kong romantic fantasy comedy film directed by Taylor Wong and starring Joey Wong, Tony Leung and Deanie Ip.

== Plot ==
One time during a traffic accident, Stupid Shing (Tony Leung), a talented but frustrated manhua artist, encounters female ghost Ching-ching (Joey Wong), who was ready to be married to the Blood Demon. During the accident, Shing's car strayed into the underworld and knocks Ching's spirit to the living world.

When Ching arrives to the living world, she has no knowledge about the environment. Fortunately, she meets the Ghost whore (Deanie Ip), where they tell their life experiences to one another. The Ghost whore was a young widow who was accused of adultery and as a result, she and her son were drowned to death.

Ching has a soft spot for Shing and secretly uses her supernatural powers to helps him to move up in his career to become a popular cartoonist, which, however, causes her to become increasingly frail. On the other hand, the Ghost whore's son finally gets the chance to reincarnate as a human. For this to happen, however, the Ghost whore must capture and bring Ching back to the underworld to be married to the Blood Demon. For the sake of her son, the Ghost whore unhesitatingly betrays Ching.

In order to save his lover, Shing is determined to break into the underworld to battle with the Blood Demon. Finally, the Ghost whore sacrifices her soul to save Shing and Ching and battles to the death with the Blood Demon.

== Cast ==
- Joey Wong as Ching-ching
- Tony Leung Chiu-wai as Stupid Shing
- Deanie Ip as Ghost whore
- Paul Chun as Lemon Head
- Willie Fung as Fool
- Tien Feng as Magic Man
- Wong Chi-keung as Ghost bully
- Chan King as Mahjong gambler
- Cheng Siu as Lemon Head's staff

== Reception ==
=== Critical ===
LoveHKFilm gave the film a negative review, criticizing its humor and "unfunny" and the lack of development of the romance between its two main characters.

=== Box office ===
The film grossed HK$1,937,025 at the Hong Kong box office during its theatrical run from 4 to 10 April 1991 in Hong Kong.
