= No Risk, No Gain =

1990 Hong Kong comedy film by Jimmy Heung

- Film poster
- Traditional Chinese: 至尊計狀元才
- Simplified Chinese: 至尊计状元才
- Hanyu Pinyin: Zhì Zūn Jì Zhuàng Yuán Cái
- Jyutping: Zi3 Zyun1 Gai3 Zong4 Jyun4 Coi4
- Directed by: Jimmy Heung; Taylor Wong
- Written by: Wong Jing
- Produced by: Wong Jing
- Starring: Alan Tam; Andy Lau; Natalis Chan; Chen Song-yong; Michelle Reis; May Lo; Christine Ng; Shing Fui-On; Anthony Wong
- Cinematography: David Chung
- Edited by: Robert Choi
- Music by: Lowell Lo; Sherman Chow
- Production company: Win's Entertainment
- Distributed by: Media Asia Entertainment Group; Orange Sky Golden Harvest
- Release date: 5 April 1990
- Running time: 108 minutes
- Country: Hong Kong
- Languages: Cantonese; Mandarin; English
- Box office: HK$19,078,746

No Risk, No Gain is 1990 Hong Kong comedy film directed by Jimmy Heung and Taylor Wong and starring Alan Tam, Andy Lau and Natalis Chan. It is the second installment of the Casino Raiders series.

== Plot ==
Cheung San-ho forces Ray to Macau to compete with him in gambling and has Ray to go to Macau to wait for his arrival. Coming back from the United States to Hong Kong in search of his cousin, he was swindled by con artists Big Dee and Leslie Mo, who take his gambling stake and VIP card (an identification given by Cheung to Ray). The two counterfeit Ray's supreme identity (Leslie acts as Ray while Big Dee acts as his bodyguard) to Macau for gambling. Not long later, Ray catches up and catches them, but decided to let Leslie impersonate him. Unexpectedly, Yeung Sing and Yeung Chun have evil intentions, planning to murder the three of them and then frame Cheung. When Yeung Sing brings his three henchmen to kill them, Yeung Chun and Cheung arrive, and Chun kills Sing. Cheung apologises to Ray for this incident, while Ray suggests Big Dee and Leslie take part in the gambling competition, to which Cheung agrees. During the final round of the competition, due to Cheung and Ray's rivalry for snipe and the clam, it allows Big Dee to get all the spoils of a small card to become the big winner. But after the game, Yeung Chun reveals his true self: he wanted to takes his boss Cheung's spot and hired Big Fool to kill him, but Big Fool did not listen to Chun because he is actually Ray's longtime friend. In the end, Yeung Chun gets his punishment. After that, Ray returns to the United States while Big Dee makes a deal with him that, a year later, he will truly beat Ray again at the gambling table.

== Cast ==
- Alan Tam as Ray
- Andy Lau as Big Dee
- Natalis Chan as Leslie Mau / Snake
- Chen Sung-young as Cheung San-ho
- Michelle Reis as Winnie
- May Lo as Jane Tsang
- Christine Ng as Maureen
- Shing Fui-On as Big Fool
- Anthony Wong as Yeung Sing
- Cutie Mui as Sexy (cameo)
- Tien Feng as Yeung Chun
- Gan Tat-wah as Western Boy
- Benz Kong as Trick gambler in jail
- San Kuai as one of Sing's men
- Paul Wong as one of Sing's men
- Ho Kwok-wah as one of Sing's men
- Chow Chi-hung as one of Sing's men
- Ridley Tsui as one of Sing's men
- Lee Hang as one of Sing's men
- Wan Seung-lam as one of Sing's men
- Kong Lung as Sing's bodyguard
- So Wai-nam as Gangster after Leslie
- Gan Seung-yuk as Gambler at Gambling competition
- Law Shu-kei as Gambling competition's emcee
- Chang Seng-kwong as Fake cop
- Ernest Mauser as Spectator at gambling competition
- Fung Man-kwong as one of Ho's men

== Theme song ==
- "Warm-Blooded Man" (熱血男兒)
  - Composer: Siu Fung
  - Lyricist: Keith Chan Siu-kei
  - Singer: Andy Lau

== Box office ==
The film grossed HK$19,078,746 at the Hong Kong box office during its theatrical run from 5 April to 26 April 1990 in Hong Kong
