= No More Love, No More Death =

1993 Hong Kong film by Herman Yau

- DVD cover
- Traditional Chinese: 太子傳說
- Simplified Chinese: 太子传说
- Hanyu Pinyin: Tài Zǐ Chuán Shuō
- Jyutping: Taai3 Zi2 Cyun4 Syut3
- Directed by: Herman Yau; Taylor Wong
- Screenplay by: Chau Ting
- Produced by: Taylor Wong
- Starring: Jacky Cheung; Rosamund Kwan; Carina Lau; Chin Ho; Hacken Lee; Michael Chan
- Cinematography: Herman Yau
- Music by: Wong Yiu-kwong
- Production companies: Carianna Film & Entertainment Production
- Distributed by: Newport Entertainment
- Release date: 16 April 1993
- Running time: 89 minutes
- Country: Hong Kong
- Language: Cantonese
- Box office: HK$6,917,896

No More Love, No More Death is a 1993 Hong Kong action film directed by Herman Yau and Taylor Wong, starring Jacky Cheung, Rosamund Kwan and Carina Lau. The film is a prequel to the 1992 film, With or Without You, and was produced in response to the popularity of Cheung's character, "Prince".

== Plot ==
Triad leaders White Tiger (Chan Yuen) and Green Dragon (Michael Chan) become enemies while fighting for the objection of Yuk-fung (Yip San). Tiger abducts the child Prince and fabricates a story of how his mother was abducted by Dragon. Since then, Prince was determined to study martial arts in order to kill Dragon and rescue his mother. Prince was trained by Tiger to be a killer, and killing Dragon have become Prince's goal.

One day, when Prince (Jacky Cheung) had the chance to kill Dragon, he sees his dream lover, Tweedy (Rosamund Kwan), and as a result, fails to kill Dragon, breaking his reputation of never making mistakes on missions. Prince's assistant, Ching-ching (Carina Lau), who is deeply in love with him, arranges Tweedy to seemingly disappear for a while for his sake. However, Prince mistakenly believes that Ching-ching betrayed him and killed Tweedy and begins to drink heavily. Because he thinks Tweedy is dead, Prince feels hopeless.

Later, Tiger calls Dragon out to meet with him, telling him that Prince is actually Dragon's son, a fact that Prince did not expect. When Tiger and Dragon were arguing who is truly Prince's father, Tiger points his gun at Prince and blames Prince for his resentments. During a battle, Ching-ching gets shot and killed by Tiger in order to protect Prince. Afterwards, Prince sadly carries Ching-ching away, reminiscing a time when Ching-ching asked him whether he will cry when she dies. Later, Tweedy also tells Prince that Ching-ching entrusted her to not meet with him until he kills Dragon. Prince did not say a word, and silently watches the distant sunset with Tweedy.

== Cast ==
- Jacky Cheung as Prince
- Rosamund Kwan as Tweedy
- Carina Lau as Ching-ching
- Chin Ho as Mute killer
- Hacken Lee as Cop
- Michael Chan as Green Dragon
- Chan Yuen as White Dragon
- Wong Siu-lung as Cop
- Lisa Tung as Lisa
- Tip San as Yuk-fung
- So Wai-nam as Bodyguard
- Lam Kwok-kit as Bodyguard
- Lee Ka-hung as Bodyguard
- Wong Kar-leung as Policeman in elevator
- Jim James as Judge

== Reception ==
=== Critical reception ===
LoveHKFilm gave the film a mixed review, citing cheesy production values and that "nothing really makes sense", but also noting how "the production design and cinematography are overblown to entertaining distraction, and the stars are welcome ones nowadays."

=== Box office ===
The film grossed HK$6,917,896 at the Hong Kong box office during its theatrical run from 16 to 29 April 1993.

== See also ==
- Jacky Cheung filmography
