= Tragic Hero (film) =

1987 Hong Kong film by Taylor Wong

- DVD cover
- Traditional Chinese: 英雄好漢
- Simplified Chinese: 英雄好汉
- Hanyu Pinyin: Yīng Xióng Hǎo Hàn
- Jyutping: Jing1 Hung1 Hou2 Hon3
- Directed by: Taylor Wong
- Written by: Manfred Wong; Stephen Shiu
- Produced by: Johnny Mak
- Starring: Chow Yun-fat; Andy Lau; Alex Man; Danny Lee; Carina Lau; Ko Chun-hsiung; Pauline Wong
- Cinematography: Herman Yau; Abdul M. Rumjahn; Johnny Koo
- Edited by: Ma Chung-yiu; A Chik
- Music by: Joseph Chan; Sherman Chow
- Production company: Johnny Mak Production
- Distributed by: Win's Entertainment; Gala Film Distribution Limited
- Release date: 20 February 1987
- Running time: 97 minutes
- Country: Hong Kong
- Language: Cantonese
- Box office: HK$18,931,893

Tragic Hero (Cantonese Yale: Ying hung ho hon), also known as Rich and Famous II, is a 1987 Hong Kong action-crime film directed by Taylor Wong, and starring Chow Yun-fat, Andy Lau, and Alex Man. The film is the sequel to Rich and Famous but was released first.

== Summary ==
The movie is set in 1980. Ah-chai meets with Chu Lo-tai, his previous rival, now his business partner. Ah-chai warns Chu Lo-tai that Yung is becoming too powerful. Chu Lo-tai acknowledges this threat and plots to have Yung assassinated. Chu Lo-tai and his gang meet for dinner, where Yung stabs Chu Lo-tai to death with a broken bottle. Yung now leads Chu's gang and begins asserting his superiority over Ah-chai and his family.

Ah-chai says that he will call a meeting with the other remaining gangs to wipe Yung out. Ai-chai's lieutenants, Number 6 and Big Eye, fear that their boss has grown soft. Number 6 decides to take matters into his own hands and proceeds with his plot to assassinate Yung. That afternoon, Number 6 tries to kill Yung before his men shoot Number 6 multiple times in the neck and face.

Ah-chai questions Big Eye about how Yung's men knew about Number 6's assassination plot. Big Eye admits to his betrayal and explains that he was only trying to save himself. Ah-chai spares him. Big Eye attempts to get out of the car and is killed by the driver. At a meeting of the triads, Ah-chai is arrested by the police. Yung taunts him that he no longer has friends on either side of the law.

After Ah-chai gets out of custody, he and his family escape to Malacca and visit Kwok. Yung sends assassins to Malacca to leave a bomb in the house.The bomb kills Kwok's wife, his adopted children, and Ah-chai's family. Chai and Kwok swear revenge on Yung.

Yung discovers that his father has been seen in the same area as Ah-chai and Kwok. Yung is enraged that his father has openly betrayed him and admits to the killings. His father attacks him and Yung tells his lackeys to beat his father. Yung's father gets in a waiting taxi. A lackey approaches the back of the car and is shot in the face. Ah-chai and Kwok jump out of the car and kill everybody in the vicinity. Chuan gets out and grabs a large of bag of heavy weaponry. They rush into the house and kill many of Yung's men. In a final showdown, both Yung and his father are killed. Ah-chai falls down in exhaustion and Inspector Cheung shows up to save them.

Chai tells Cheung that he alone killed all those people, and that Kwok and Kwok's father are innocent onlookers. Cheung says he will try to help Kwok at trial. Ah-chai and Kwok are carried out on stretchers as the movie ends.

== Cast ==
- Chow Yun-fat as Lee Ah-chai
- Andy Lau as Lam Ting-kwok
- Alex Man as Tang Kar-yung
- Pauline Wong as Tang Wai-chiu
- Carina Lau as Lau Po-yee
- Danny Lee as Inspector Cheung
- Shing Fui-On as Number 6
- Ko Chun-hsiung as Chu Lo-tai
- Alex Ng as Chuan
- Lam Chung as Big Eye
- Elvis Tsui as Yung's thug
- Peter Yang as Uncle Chi
- Yip San as wife
- Angela Yu Chien as Mrs. Chu

== Reception ==
A retrospective review at the release of the 2003 DVD stated: "The film is so muddled that it becomes incomprehensible and as a viewer your mind begins to wander off to do those algebraic equations that you've been putting off. Either that or it sends you to sleep. The film is dull in story and execution."
