= My Hero (1990 film) =

1990 Hong Kong film by Bryan Leung

- DVD cover
- Traditional Chinese: 一本漫畫闖天涯
- Simplified Chinese: 一本漫画闯天涯
- Hanyu Pinyin: Yī Běn Màn Huà Chuǎng Tiān Yá
- Jyutping: Jat1 Bun2 Man6 Waa2 Cong2 Tin1 Ngaai4
- Directed by: Bryan Leung
- Screenplay by: Bryan Leung; Ho Tung; Cho Chung Sing
- Produced by: Yuen Kam Lun
- Starring: Stephen Chow; Ann Bridgewater; Wilson Lam; Shing Fui-On; Peter Yang; Bryan Leung
- Cinematography: Nico Wong
- Edited by: Cheung Bei Tak
- Music by: Chyi Chin; Wong Man Ching; Taipei Rainbow Music Studio; Norman Wong
- Production company: Chun Sing Films
- Distributed by: D&B Films
- Release date: 22 March 1990
- Running time: 93 minutes
- Country: Hong Kong
- Language: Cantonese
- Box office: HK$15,149,253

My Hero is a 1990 Hong Kong crime action comedy film directed by Bryan Leung, who also served as action director and acts in a supporting role in the film. The film stars Stephen Chow, Ann Bridgewater and Wilson Lam.

== Plot ==
Restaurant waiter Sing (Stephen Chow) has always been obsessed with manhuas featuring triads and hoping to be part of them. One time, Sing rescues triad leader Wai Kit (Peter Yang), who takes Sing under his wing. Sing also becomes good friends with Wai's underlings Chun (Wilson Lam) and Bill (Shing Fui-On). Later, Wai intends to retire and chooses his successor from the aforementioned trio. Then, the trio are sent to the Golden Triangle for trading activities. Although faced with obstacles, they successfully completed the mission. However, after returning to Hong Kong, due to conflicts in the gang, Bill is killed, Sing becomes an outcast and Chun also dies while rescuing Sing. The melancholic Sing then leaves the underworld.

== Cast ==
- Stephen Chow as Sing
- Ann Bridgewater (柏安妮) as Ann
- Wilson Lam as Chun
- Peter Yang as Wai Kit
- Shing Fui-On as Bill Chu
- Bryan Leung as Hung Yee
- Yuen Woo-ping as Yi
- Lung Ming Yan as Vietnamese drug boss
- Lily Li as Heung
- Tung Chi as Ming
- Cheung Miu Hau as Shark Tak
- Cho Chung Sing as Thai General Bai Chai
- Ho Tung
- Chiang Tao as Bai Chai's man / Man in Nightclub
- Pomson Shi as Wai's killer
- Alex Ng as Wai's bodyguard
- James Ha as Hung Yee's gunman at nightclub / Soldier
- So Hon Sang as Hung Yee's gunman at nightclub
- Lau Kwai Fong as Bill's wife
- Yeung Yau Cheung as Nightclub manager
- Cheung Ka Yan
- Cheung Kwok Leung as One of Wai's Men
- Ho Chi Moon as Uncle Chun
- Mai Kei as Rascal harassing Ann
- Lai Sing Kwong
- Cheung Siu

== Box office ==
The film grossed HK$15,149,253 at the Hong Kong box office during its theatrical run from 22 March to 11 April 1990 in Hong Kong.
