= Cecil Chao =

Hong Kong billionaire

- Born: Cecil Chao Sze-Tsung; 27 September 1936 (age 89); Shanghai, China
- Education: University of Durham
- Occupation: Chairman of Cheuk Nang (Holdings) Ltd.
- Children: 3; including Gigi
- Parent(s): Chao Tsong-yea (father); Chao Nyi Ya-tsung (mother)

Chinese name
- Traditional Chinese: 趙世曾
- Simplified Chinese: 赵世曾
Transcriptions
Standard Mandarin
- Hanyu Pinyin: Zhào Shìzēng
- Wade–Giles: Chao Shih-tseng

Cecil Chao Sze-Tsung (Chinese: 趙世曾; born 27 September 1936) is a Hong Kong billionaire who is the owner of Cheuk Nang (Holdings) Ltd, a Hong Kong-based property development and investment company, known for its focus on residential and commercial real estate projects in the region.

The Chao family is a prominent shipping dynasty in Hong Kong, founded by Chao Tsong-yea in the mid-20th century. Chao is the last surviving of the four sons of Wuxi-born shipping tycoon Chao Tsong-yea and his wife Chao Nyi Ya-tsung. His elder brother Frank Chao Sze-bang died in 2001, and his younger brother George Chao Sze-kwong died in 2016.

He claims to have dated over 10,000 women. He has three children by three of them: Wai Yiu (mother of Gigi Chao), Ying Ying (mother of Howard), and Terri Holladay (mother of Roman).

In 2012, Chao gained international attention when he offered $65 million to any man who could convince his lesbian daughter, Gigi Chao, to marry him. Despite criticism, Chao remained unrepentant. In 2014, Chao increased the reward to $120 million. Gigi responded publicly in an open letter printed in the South China Morning Post. He has since rescinded the offer publicly.
