= The Godfather's Daughter Mafia Blues =

1991 Hong Kong film by Fung Hark-on

- Film poster
- Traditional Chinese: 烈火情仇
- Simplified Chinese: 烈火情仇
- Hanyu Pinyin: Liè Huǒ Qíng Chóu
- Jyutping: Lit6 Fo2 Cing4 Sau4
- Directed by: Fung Hark-On
- Screenplay by: Siao Lung
- Produced by: Wong Siu-ming; Norman Cheung
- Starring: Alex Man; Yukari Oshima; Mark Cheng; Dick Wei
- Cinematography: Ma Kam-cheung; Stephen Poon
- Edited by: Yu Tin-hung
- Music by: Chan Tik-hong
- Production companies: High Grow Film; Chun Sing Film
- Distributed by: D&B Films
- Release date: 31 October 1991
- Running time: 91 minutes
- Country: Hong Kong
- Language: Cantonese
- Box office: HK$1,403,609

The Godfather's Daughter Mafia Blues is a 1991 Hong Kong action film directed by Fung Hark-On, who also served as the film's action director and appears in a supporting role, and starring Alex Man, Yukari Oshima, Mark Cheng and Dick Wei.

== Plot ==
Wai (Mark Cheng), a new immigrant from mainland China, works at a fish raft with his friend Nam (Benny Lai). In China, Wai served in the People's Liberation Army's special forces where he was trained intensively in Chinese Kung Fu. One time during a misunderstanding, Wai meets Lee Wah-yu (Alex Man), mastermind of a financial group and triad boss, and becomes Lee's follower.

Tetsuya is the leader of Japan's Yamaguchi-gumi gang and Lee's business partner in Hong Kong and always had pleasant cooperation with Lee. After Tetsuya dies, his son Kuyama (Ken Lo) inherits his position. Kuyama, who is reckless, arrogant and greedy, hopes to use financial power to strike down Lee. In order to prevent his followers from being ruined for life, Lee was forced to deploy cash from his own company to purchase Kuyama's stock rights. Tung (Dick Wei) was Lee's sworn brother in the past who secretly used public funds of the company to run a smuggling business in China. However, his smuggling business was a failure where he went broke and attempts to flee when he was unable to give an explanation to Lee. In order to reduce the outrage of other sworn brothers, Lee wounded Tung's leg with a gunshot.

Amy (Yukari Oshima), Lee's only daughter, returns after studying abroad in Japan. Discontented with Kuyama's actions, Amy confronts him where she injures his face. Holding a grudge, Kuyama conspires with Tung to murder Lee. After Lee died, Wai and Amy investigates into it and find out that Lee was murdered by Kuyama and Tung and were determined to seek revenge. After repeated struggles, Wai and Amy finally eliminates the enemy and traitor together.

== Cast ==
- Alex Man as Master Lee Wah-yu
- Yukari Oshima as Amy Lee
- Mark Cheng as Wai
- Dick Wei as Master Tung
- Ken Lo as Kuyama
- Benny Lai as Nam
- Tung Chi
- Fung Hark-On as Kak
- Wong Yue as Mr. Hung
- Steve Mak as Policeman
- Peter Yang as Senior in Lee Wah-yu's triad (cameo)
- Bryan Leung as Senior in Lee Wah-yu's triad (cameo)
- Fung Fung as Uncle Fung (cameo)
- Tai Po
- Wynn Lau as Master Yung
- Fong Yau
- Chow Fong
- Ko Shut-fung as Kuyama's thug
- Foo Wang-tat as Mr. Yamada
- Ho Tung
- Mark King
- Alice Fung So-bor
- Anthony Chung
- Tong Pau-ching
- Lee Fat-yuen
- To Wai-wo
- Lai Sing-kwong
- Lam Foo-wai as Lee Wah-yu's thug
- Leung Hung as Uncle
- Ho Chi-moon as Club customer
- Ling Chi-hung as Lee Wah-yu's thug
- Christopher Chan as Lee Wah-yu's thug
- Cheng Chi-ho as Bodyguard
- Lau Chi-ming as Rascal
- Pang Hiu-sang as Rascal
- Louis Keung as Kuyama's thug
- Chan Tat-kwong
- Chu Tau
- Hon Chun

== Reception ==
=== Critical ===
The 14 Amazons gave the film a score of 8/10 and praised its plot and action scenes and wrote, "The consistency and attention to detail in the movie show that a lot of care and effort went into its production." Trash Cinema Club rated the film three and a half stars out of five and praised the action scenes and acting from the cast but criticized the inconsistencies that occur later in the film.

=== Box office ===
The film grossed HK$1,403,609 at the Hong Kong box office during its theatrical run from 31 October to 6 November 1991 in Hong Kong.
