= With or Without You (1992 film) =

1992 Hong Kong film by Taylor Wong

- DVD cover
- Traditional Chinese: 明月照尖東
- Simplified Chinese: 明月照尖东
- Hanyu Pinyin: Míng Yuè Zhào Jiān Dōng
- Jyutping: Ming4 Jyut6 Ziu3 Zim1 Dung1
- Directed by: Taylor Wong
- Screenplay by: Lam Kee-to; Lam Chiu-wing
- Produced by: Richard Cheung
- Starring: Jacky Cheung; Leon Lai; Rosamund Kwan; Ng Man-tat
- Cinematography: Herman Yau
- Music by: Tats Lau
- Production companies: Carianna Film & Entertainment Production
- Distributed by: Golden Princess Amusement
- Release date: 21 May 1992
- Running time: 86 minutes
- Country: Hong Kong
- Language: Cantonese
- Box office: HK$9,601,534

With or Without You is a 1992 Hong Kong action film directed by Taylor Wong and starring Jacky Cheung, Leon Lai, Rosamund Kwan and Ng Man-tat. Due to the popularity of Cheung's role as the antagonist, "Prince", a prequel to the film, titled No More Love, No More Death, which focuses on the character of "Prince", was released the following year.

== Plot ==
One day, police officer Ming (Leon Lai) meets Tweedy (Rosamund Kwan) in the streets and develops a crush on her and follows her to a bar where she works at in order to woo her, while in the pretense of interrogating her. Later, when Ming broke up with his girlfriend, he goes to Tweedy's bar where they have a chat before Ming gets drunk and accidentally drops his issued pistol. Fortunately, Ming receives a tip about a firearms trade between Ming's informant, Chiu (Yu Kwok-lok), and triad leader, Mute (Anthony Cho). Chiu then discovers that Tweedy is an accomplice of Mute and chases after her, which caught the attention of Ming. When Chiu tells Ming that his pistol is hidden in the male's bathroom, Ming unexpectedly sees Tweedy outside the bathroom, leading him to mistakenly believe that she was involved in the trade. When Ming was unable to find his pistol, he goes the bar to look for Tweedy, much to the displeasure of her boss, Tung (John Ching). At this time, Mute also shoots and kills Chiu, and Ming chases after Mute before losing him. At the murder scene, Ming discovers that the bullet cannot be found and while he searches for it, Tweedy had given the bullet to Tat (Ng Man-tat). When Mute finds out that Ming is going to arrest Tweedy, Mute surrenders himself to Ming, and tells Ming the whereabouts of his lost pistol. After find his pistol, Ming receives news of triad hitman, Prince's (Jacky Cheung), return to Hong Kong. Through the files of Prince, Ming discovers that Tweedy is Prince's girlfriend. When Prince returns, he goes to Tweedy's bar, where at this time, Tung was causing a scene and bullying women with alcohol. At the same time, Ming also arrives to present a birthday gift to Tweedy, which angers Prince when she choose Ming over him. Using explosives he carries on him, Prince threatens Ming and manages to escape the surrounding of the police by using hostages, where he drives away in his sports car with Tweedy. Ming chases after Prince and a gunfight ensues between them. Later, as Prince attempts to drive away, he was pushed to the docks and surrounded by the police. Seeing how he has no way out, Prince detonates the bombs and tries to run over Ming and Tweedy. But at the last moment, he sees how they’re in love and decides to turn the car around crashing into the ocean as the bombs explode.

== Cast ==
- Leon Lai as Ming
- Jacky Cheung as Prince
- Rosamund Kwan as Tweedy
- Ng Man-tat as Tat
- Margaret Lee as Sister Ha
- John Ching as Tung
- Yu Kwok-lok as Chiu
- James Ha as Tung's thug
- Anthony Cho as Mute
- Chan Tat-kwong as Tung's thug
- Kong Miu-deng as Tung's thug
- Yip San as Ming's girlfriend
- Jacky Cheung Chun-ming as Gangster
- Fan Chin-hung as Gangster
- Chan Wai-to as Gangster

== Theme song ==
- Love Belongs to Abjection (情歸落泊)
  - Composer: Marc Almond
  - Lyricist: Lau Cheuk-fai
  - Singer: Leon Lai
- Understanding My Heart (明明白白我的心)
  - Composer/Lyricist: Jonathan Lee
  - Singer: Jackie Chan, Sarah Chen

== Box office ==
The film grossed HK$9,601,534 at the Hong Kong box office during its theatrical run from 21 May to 4 June 1992.
