= Kung Fu VS Acrobatic =

1990 Hong Kong film by Taylor Wong

- DVD cover
- 摩登如來神掌
- Directed by: Taylor Wong
- Screenplay by: Wong Jing
- Produced by: Jimmy Heung
- Starring: Andy Lau; Natalis Chan; Joey Wong; Yuen Wah; Cutie Mui
- Cinematography: David Chung; Gigo Lee; Chan Siu-kwan
- Edited by: Robert Choi
- Music by: Lowell Lo; Sherman Chow
- Production company: Win's Entertainment
- Distributed by: Newport Entertainment
- Release date: 21 July 1990
- Running time: 99 minutes
- Country: Hong Kong
- Language: Cantonese
- Box office: HK $11,160,216

Kung Fu VS Acrobatic (摩登如來神掌) is a 1990 Hong Kong martial arts fantasy comedy film directed by Taylor Wong and starring Andy Lau, Natalis Chan and Joey Wong. The film is a homage to the 1964 martial arts film Buddha's Palm which starred Cho Tat-wah, who also had a supporting role in the film.

== Synopsis ==
Advertising company staff Mo Tak-fai and his friend Lai Chi go to mainland China for a business trip. Chi smuggles some relics, leading to them being chased by the police. They go into a cave to escape capture, but Chi is bitten by a poisonous snake. He finds a medicine belonging to an ancient hero named Long Jianfei and shares it with Tak-fai. Not only does the medicine detoxifies Chi, it also bestows Tak-fai and Chi internal strengths. They also rescue Princess Yunluo and her maid Xiaoman from the Yuan dynasty after 800 years of slumber but in the process also releasing a two-hundred-year-old evil martial arts expert Tian Can.

Fai and Chi remain skeptical about the things that happened and they bring the two ladies to Hong Kong. Yunluo is able to adapt to modern life in Hong Kong very quickly. On the other hand, in order to defeat Tian Can, Yunluo helps Fai to learn the "Buddha's Palm" technique while Chi, due to poor qualifications, only excel at the "Seven Rotary Slice" technique. However, when Tian Can arrives he effortlessly defeats Fai since he has not mastered the "Ten Thousand Buddhas" technique. Tian Can forces Fai to eat a cursed silkworm, which can cause pain to people who consume it when Tian Can plays his drum.

The next day, Tian Can goes on a spree. He steals money from a bank ATM, threatens Fai and Chi to go to their boss' home and capture his family, as well as defeating the police who come after them. Yunluo saves the two men but Fai is furtherly injured by Tian Can in the process. Fortunately they come across Yim Chan, leader of a supernatural performing troupe from China, who heals Fai from his injuries while also channelling energy to him. A few days later, Fai finally masters the "Ten Thousand Buddhas" technique. He and his friends confront Tian Can in a final duel and Fai uses "Ten Thousand Buddhas" to cripple Tian Can's martial arts ability, becoming a true hero in the end.

== Cast ==
- Andy Lau as Mo Tak-fai
- Natalis Chan as Lai Chi
- Joey Wong as Princess Wan-lo
- Yuen Wah as Tin-chan
- Cutie Mui as Siu-man
- Cho Tat-wah as Ku Se / Lung Kim-fei
- Lau Shun as Yim Chan
- Ngai Ping-lung as Mo Tak-fai's boss
- Lau Chi-wing as Police captain
- Shing Fui-On as Cop on motorcycle
- Chan King as Human smuggler
- San Kuai as Kao Li-chiu
- Kong Chuen as Kao Li-pa
- Lee Siu-kei as One of Pa's men
- Jameson Lam as One of Pa's men
- Lee Hang as One of Chiu's men
- Lam Foo-wai as One of Chiu's men
- Yiu Yau-hung as Taxi driver with spanner
- Kwan Hoi-san as Man in intro (Footage from Buddha's Palm)
- Ko Lo-chuen as Man in intro (Footage from Buddha's Palm)
- Chan Wai-yu as Woman in intro (Footage from Buddha's Palm)
- Yu So-chow as Woman in intro (Footage from Buddha's Palm)
- Lam Fung as Woman in intro (Footage from Buddha's Palm)
- Wong Chi-keung as Bus driver
- Chin Tsi-ang as Old woman with child boarding bus
- Hon San as National treasure seller

== Theme song ==
- Martial Arts Supreme (武林至尊) (Cantonese version)
  - Composer: Lowell Lo
  - Lyricist: Peter Lai
  - Singer: Andy Lau
- Young Hero (英雄出少年) ((Mandarin version)
  - Composer: Lowell Lo
  - Lyricist: James Wong
  - Singer: James Wong

== Box office ==
The film grossed HK$11,160,216 at the Hong Kong box office during its theatrical run from 21 July to 11 August 1990 in Hong Kong.

== See also ==
- Andy Lau filmography
- Yuen Wah filmography
- Wong Jing filmography
