= Gangland Odyssey =

1990 Hong Kong film by Michael Chan

- Film poster
- Traditional Chinese: 義膽雄心
- Simplified Chinese: 义胆雄心
- Hanyu Pinyin: Yì Dǎn Xióng Xīn
- Jyutping: Ji6 Daam2 Hung4 Sam1
- Directed by: Michael Chan
- Screenplay by: Sze-to On
- Produced by: Yuen Sin-kan
- Starring: Andy Lau; Alex Man; Michael Chan; Kelly Yiu; Regina Kent
- Cinematography: Peter Ngor
- Edited by: Cheung Kwok-kuen
- Music by: Tang Siu-lam
- Production company: Hatract Films
- Distributed by: Golden Princess Films
- Release date: 13 September 1990
- Running time: 93 minutes
- Country: Hong Kong
- Languages: Cantonese; Japanese
- Box office: HK$7,385,637

Gangland Odyssey is a 1990 Hong Kong action film directed by Michael Chan and starring Andy Lau, Alex Man and Chan.

== Plot ==
When retired police detective Fan Chi-hung hears that his former superior Brown's son has been kidnapped, he comes back to Hong Kong from the United States to assist in the rescue. Along with Brown's adopted son, Kit, they go through several investigations and finally rescues the child, which Brown is grateful about. Fan also takes the opportunity to see his ex-lover, Shirley. Kit also knows Shirley and gradually falls for her daughter, Cindy. Things suddenly change, when it is revealed that Brown actually engulfed a huge sum of money from a Japanese company, which leads Yakuza member Hoshida to Hong Kong to find out the truth. Hoshida, who was originally named Pu, was Shirley's ex-husband when the former was a triad member in Hong Kong. When Browns learns about this relationship, he tells Fan to depart from Hong Kong and let him negotiate in Japan. Unexpectedly, Brown betrays Fan, and the Yakuza tries to kill Kit and Fan and later kills Kit and Cindy. Fan also unintentionally learns of Hoshida and Shirley's relationship and Fan decides to battle to death with the Yakuza.

== Cast ==
- Andy Lau as Kit
- Alex Man as Fan Chi-hung
- Michael Chan as Pu / Hoshida
- Kelly Yiu as Shirley
- Regina Kent as Cindy
- Shing Fui-On as Maddy
- Ng Man-tat as Uncle Eleven
- Siu Yam-yam as Mrs. Brown
- Alan Tang as Mr. Tang
- Lau Yuk-kei as Cheung
- Fong Yau as Uncle Pin
- Sing Yan as Sisan Triad's boss
- Roger Ball as Mr. Brown
- Lam Shung-ching as thug
- Ching Kong
- Ricky Kwong
- Ng Shek-long
- Ng Chung-man
- Kam Wai-kwong
- Wong Koon-ko
- Luk Chuen as Nakacho
- Suen Kwok-ming as Sisan Triad's thug
- James Ha as Sisan Triad's thug
- Chu Tau as Cheung's thug
- Ridley Tsui as assassin
- Danny Chow as assassin
- Wong Chi-keung as assassin
- Hung Chi-sing as assassin
- Hui Sze-man as Elecen's wife
- Jim James as Mr Brown's party guest
- Fung Man-kwong
- Jack Wong
- Lee Fat-yuen
- Lai Sing-kwong

== Theme song ==
- Farewell Jiang Hu (别了江湖)
  - Composer/Lyricist: James Wong
  - Singer: Andy Lau

== Reception ==
=== Critical ===
So Good Reviews gave the film a mixed review praising its hard boiled style action but stating these are the only aspects worth remembering.

=== Box office ===
The film grossed HK$7,385,637 at the Hong Kong box office during its theatrical run from 13 to 26 September 1990 in Hong Kong.

== See also ==
- Andy Lau filmography
