= A Better Tomorrow II =

1987 Hong Kong film by John Woo

- Original film poster
- Chinese: 英雄本色2
- Hanyu Pinyin: Yīngxióng běnsè èr
- Jyutping: Jing1hung4 bun2sik1 ji6
- Directed by: John Woo
- Written by: John Woo; Tsui Hark; Chan Hing-Ka; Leung Suk-wah
- Produced by: Tsui Hark
- Starring: Dean Shek; Ti Lung; Leslie Cheung; Chow Yun-fat
- Cinematography: Wong Wing-hung
- Edited by: David Wu
- Music by: Joseph Koo; Lowell Lo
- Production companies: Cinema City; Film Workshop
- Distributed by: Golden Princess Film Production
- Release date: 17 December 1987
- Running time: 104 minutes
- Country: Hong Kong
- Languages: Cantonese; English
- Box office: HK$22.7 million

A Better Tomorrow II (Chinese: 英雄本色2; Jyutping: Jing1hung4 bun2sik1 ji6; lit. 'True Colours of a Hero 2') is a 1987 Hong Kong action film directed by John Woo, produced by Tsui Hark, and co-written by both. The sequel to A Better Tomorrow (1986), the film stars returning cast members Chow Yun-fat, Ti Lung and Leslie Cheung alongside new cast member Dean Shek. The film was released in Hong Kong on 17 December 1987. The film director John Woo and producer Tsui Hark had disagreements over the focus of this film. Tsui felt that the film should focus more on Dean Shek's character. This led to the film being edited by both Tsui and Woo. Their disagreements would lead to a split after this film, with Hark directing A Better Tomorrow III and Woo moving on to create The Killer.

Due to the popularity of Chow's break-out performance in the previous instalment, he was cast in a new role as the twin brother of "Mark", who was killed in the previous film. A Better Tomorrow 2 is known for its over the top violence, exaggerated blood and gore, and body counts nearing the hundreds.

== Plot ==
Several years after Sung Tse-ho's arrest and following the killing of Shing in the first film (Note: As depicted in A Better Tomorrow (1986)), he is offered early parole by the police in exchange for spying on his former boss and mentor, Lung Sei, who is suspected of heading a counterfeiting operation. Inspector Wu, the leader of the task force, wants to mark his retirement with the capture of a ß criminal like Lung.

Though Ho initially declines because of his loyalty to Lung, he eventually changes his mind when he discovers that his younger brother, Kit, who is expecting a child along with his pregnant wife Jackie, is working undercover on the same case. While working the case, the two brothers meet and agree to work together.

After being framed for murder, Lung seeks Ho's help, who is able to help him escape to New York City. However, the mafia then did a hit on the church, killing the priest and many church members, and an innocent young girl died in Lung's arms. Lung was driven insane when he realized his daughter is dead, which led him to suffer a psychotic break after witnessing the death of a friend.

Meanwhile, Ho learns that his deceased friend Mark Lee has a long-lost twin brother, Ken, a former gang member who left Hong Kong as a teenager to travel across America, eventually opening a restaurant in New York City. Ho then locates Ken and enlists his assistance in freeing Lung.

Targeted by both assassins attempting to kill Lung as well as American mobsters looking to extort Ken, Ken and a catatonic Lung take refuge in an apartment building where Ken arms himself. During a shoot-out with their attackers, Ken and Lung find themselves cornered; seeing Ken in trouble snaps Lung out of his stupor, and he kills the last of their pursuers.

The two return to Hong Kong and regroup with Ho and Kit. The group discovers that one of Lung's employees, Ko Ying-pui, is responsible for attempt on Lung's life and has since taken over the organization in Lung's absence. Lung decides that he would rather destroy his organization with his own hands than let it fall into dishonor and ruin, and the group starts planning to act against Ko.

After scouting out Ko's mansion alone, Kit is fatally wounded, but is rescued by Ken, who attempts to rush him to the hospital. Knowing that he will not make it however, Kit persuades Ken to stop at a phone booth to call Jackie, where he manages to name his newborn child Sung Ho-yin ("the Spirit of Righteousness") before succumbing to his wounds.

After attending Kit's funeral, Ho, Ken, and Lung take revenge on Ko by attacking his mansion during a meeting with a counterfeiting client. The three manage to kill Ko and many of his men following an intense shootout, but are all critically wounded in the process. Following the shootout, the three men sit down in the mansion and are surrounded by the police forces led by Inspector Wu. Upon seeing the condition of the men, Wu orders his men to stand down, while Ho remarks against Inspector Wu's retirement, as there is "much work left for [him] to do."

== Cast ==
- Dean Shek as Lung Sei
- Chow Yun-fat as Ken Lee
- Ti Lung as Sung Tse-ho
- Leslie Cheung as Sung Tse-kit
- Emily Chu as Jackie, Kit's wife
- Kwan Shan as Ko Ying-pui
- Kenneth Tsang as Ken
- Regina Kent as Peggy, Lung's daughter
- Shing Fui-On and Lam Chung as Ko's partners
- Ng Man-tat as Mr. Wong
- Peter Wang as Sam
- Lung Ming-yan as Chong
- Lau Siu-ming as Chief Inspector Wu
- Louis Roth as New York Mobster
- Cindy Lau as Cindy, Ken's employee
- Ken Boyle as Counterfeiting Client
- Mark King, Mike Abbott, Wayne Archer, and Dean Harrington as New York Hitmen

== Production ==
After the success of A Better Tomorrow many imitators at other Hong Kong studios attempted to copy the film's success. As a result of the film's enduring popularity, a sequel was commissioned with John Woo returning as director as part of the reason Woo wanted to make the film was to give his friend Dean Shek a big part in the film to help alleviate financial troubles he was having at the time.

Filming took place in Hong Kong, New York City, and Hoboken, New Jersey; the first time Woo had shot a film in the United States.

=== Post-production ===
As with the original film, Woo and producer Tsui Hark's working relationship was tumultuous with the two fighting about everything from the script to the editing with Woo delivering an initial cut of two hours and forty minutes which the studio reacted with ire and demanded the film be trimmed down within a week to under two hours. Woo largely disowned the final version calling it "uneven" and "unsatisfying" but does remain proud of the film's final gunfight.

== Music ==
=== Theme song ===
"Will Rush Toward Future Day" (奔向未來日子)
- Lyrics: Wong Jim
- Composition and Arrangement: Joseph Koo
- Performance: Leslie Cheung

=== Music cues ===
This film contains music cues from other films:

- "Birdy's Flight (From 'Not One of Us')"
  - Composer: Peter Gabriel
  - From: Birdy (1984)
- "Leo Gets It"
  - Composer: Gary Chang
  - From: 52 Pick-Up (1987)
- "The Set-Up"
  - Composer: Jerry Goldsmith
  - From: Extreme Prejudice (1987)

== Release ==
The film was theatrically released in Hong Kong on 17 December 1987. In the Philippines, the film was released by First Films as Rapid Fire on 25 August 1988, with free sunglasses, jackets, and watches distributed on opening day.

Anchor Bay Entertainment released the film on DVD in the US in January 2001. Extras include the trailer and biographies. In June 2004, HKflix.com released it again on DVD along with its two sequels in a boxed set. Hong Kong Legends released a special collector's edition in the UK in September 2006.

In January 2025, Shout Factory announced that it had acquired distribution rights to the Golden Princess library. Employees discovered a "workprint" version of the movie that had been thought to be lost. This version has a running time of 140 minutes and is included in the 4K UHD / Blu-ray box set that Shout is releasing in the United States in November 2025.

== Reception ==
Rotten Tomatoes, a review aggregator, reports that 83% of six surveyed critics gave the film a positive review; the average rating was 7/10.

Writing in Sex and Zen & A Bullet in the Head, Stefan Hammond and Mike Wilkins describe the film as "gorged with Woo's trademarks" and "a funhouse exaggeration of its central motifs".

== Accolades ==
Accolades
Ceremony	Category	Recipient	Outcome
7th Hong Kong Film Awards	Best Actor	Leslie Cheung	Nominated
7th Hong Kong Film Awards	Best Action Choreography	Ching Siu-tung	Nominated

== See also ==
- Chow Yun-fat filmography
- List of Hong Kong films of 1987
- List of Hong Kong films
