= Lui Fong =

Hong Kong singer and actor

David / Josh Lui Fong
- 呂方
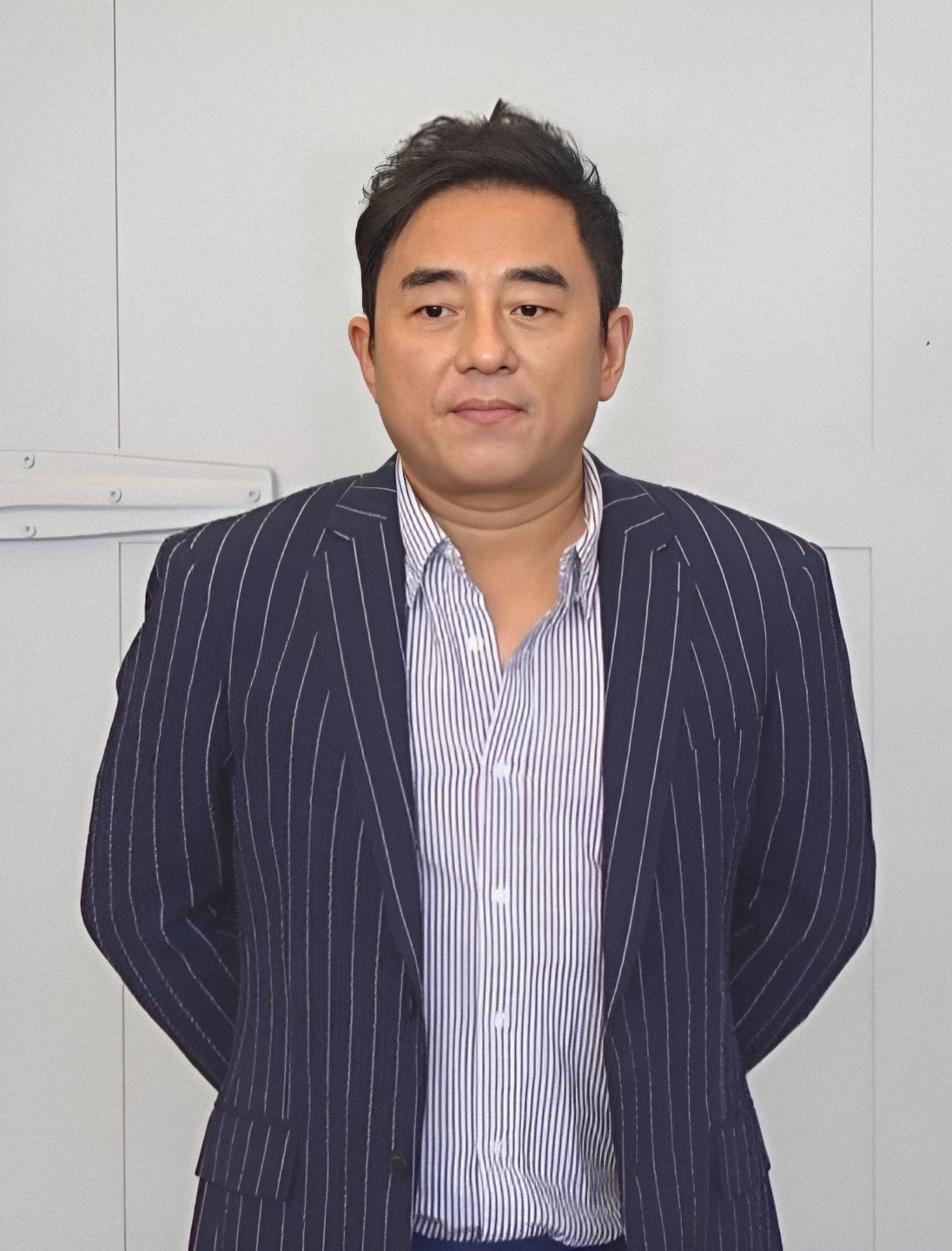
- Fong in 2019
- Born: 19 January 1964 (age 62); Nanjing, Jiangsu, China
- Occupations: Actor; singer
- Years active: 1983–present
- Spouse: Rainbow Ng (m. 2020)
- Children: 1 daughter
- Musical career
- Genres: Mandopop, Cantopop

David / Josh Lui Fong (born 19 January 1964) is a Hong Kong actor and singer.

Lui Fong made his debut in 1983 by participating in the Rookie Singing Contest organised by TVB. He has released several albums and occasionally appeared in TV dramas. His singing career stagnated in the late 1980s, but after signing with Warner Records, he regained popularity with the song "Crooked Moon" (Chinese: 彎彎的月亮). Around the same time, he expanded into the Taiwanese market and became part of the Hong Kong star wave. However, by the mid-1990s, his music career declined. In the following years, he reduced his album production and focused primarily on live performances.

== Early life ==
Lui Fong was born in Nanjing, Jiangsu, China, with ancestral roots in Shanghai. He has a younger sister. When he was young, he moved to Hong Kong with his parents and once lived in Fu Wah Village, Kwun Tong District. His father was an overseas Chinese from Singapore and worked in a travel agency.

Fong studied at Pope Pius XII Primary School (graduating from Primary 6 in 1978), Jacob English Secondary School, Moral Training English College, and Hong Kong Christian College, where he completed Form 5 in 1983. However, he had poor academic performance.

Since childhood, he had a passion for singing but was too shy to perform in front of others. It was not until January 1983, just before his high school graduation, that he was encouraged by his classmates to participate in Happy Tonight's live broadcast programme Sing. Due to his limited Cantonese proficiency, he chose to perform the popular Mandarin song "I Am Chinese" by renowned singer Cheung Ming Man.

Based on Fong's performance, Capital Artists executive Michael Lai Siu-Tin invited him to participate in the Second Rookie Singing Competition, co-organised by TVB and Capital Artists, in March of the same year. Following his mother's advice, he sought vocal training from a singing teacher to prepare for the competition. Through Michael Lai Siu-Tin's recommendation, he also studied under renowned vocal coach Dai Sicong. Fong later expressed his gratitude, saying he would always regard Michael Lai Siu-Tin as his mentor.
He was criticised for imitating Cheung Ming Man's Mao suit image but ultimately won the gold medal with the song "I Am Chinese", successfully entering the music industry.

== Career ==
After entering the industry for half a year, Fong was arranged by his company to perform in lounges and occasionally travelled to Singapore and Malaysia for stage performances.

In 1984, Fong recorded a compilation album with Little Tigers (Chinese: 小虎隊), titled "Will You Forget / Holding Back Tears and Saying Goodbye", featuring all Mandarin songs. Later, due to his youthful and straightforward appearance, he was invited to play the role of Lam Chi-Chuen (Ko Lo-Chuen) in the TV drama Police Cadet '84, marking his acting debut.

Fong rose to prominence with his lovable character and the song "You Make Me Happy" (Chinese: 妳令我快樂過), his first Cantonese song. Shortly after, he released his debut solo album, "Inaudible Speech" (Chinese: 聽不到的說話). The title track, with its nostalgic melody, complemented Lui Fong's mild and indifferent public image, expressing a man's helplessness after a breakup. The album received a positive response and earned him his first Top Ten Jade Solid Gold Award.

In 1985, Fong participated in his first major concert, "Youth Idol Concert", performing alongside Jacky Cheung, Sandy Lamb, Sandy Lam, and Priscilla Chan. In 1986, Jacky Cheung, who had a similar image, held seven consecutive "86 Double Star Concerts" at the Hung Hom Coliseum, with Tony Leung Chiu-wai as the guest performer. The concerts had an impressive attendance rate.

Fong's first three albums—"Inaudible Speech" (Chinese: 聽不到的說話), "Please Make It Clear" (Chinese: 求妳講清楚), and "Crazy Love"—were all certified platinum by the IFPI Hong Kong Top Sales Award (1988). He is best known for his lyrical slow songs but has also experimented with electronic pop and fast-tempo tracks, such as "Dance and Sing Tonight". During the same period, he also ventured into business, co-founding a lounge with friends as a side investment.

In 1990, Fong signed with Capital Artists and later switched to Warner Records. In 1991, he released the album "Eternal Life", with the title track of the same name gaining significant popularity and bringing him back into the spotlight.

In 1992, he released "Curved Moon" (彎彎的月亮), a sentimental pop song adapted from Liu Huan's original version. The song became a major hit in Hong Kong, Guangdong, and overseas Chinese communities, marking another peak in his career.

In 1996, Fong played the role of Gui Yalai in the TVB sitcom A Kindred Spirit. His romantic storyline with the character Ah Chun attracted much public attention.

Fong felt that Warner did not try hard enough to win awards for some of his popular songs such as "Wandering Flower" and "Rumors", the interlude of "True Feelings", and felt a sense of loss. After the contract ended in 1998, he did not sign with any other record company again. Afterwards, he briefly teamed up with Hacken Lee to host the Jade Solid Gold show, and began to reduce his production. He did not release any new songs or albums for a long time, and instead focused on live performances.

After the millennium, he held three concerts at the Hong Kong Coliseum, and has performed in America, Canada and other places as well as in mainland China. He has also served as a guest at concerts, such as the retirement and charity concerts of the music godfather Joseph Koo in 2015 and 2016. Because the song "Don't Cry, My Friend" (朋友別哭) unexpectedly became popular in mainland China and became a popular song for school graduation ceremonies, Fong received many performance opportunities on variety shows such as "Hidden Singer"(隱藏的歌手) and "Singing Like This Is So Beautiful" (這樣唱好美), the concert held at the Guangzhou Gymnasium in 2013 was also titled after this song.

In 2021, Fong joined Dragon TV's "Our Song (Season 3)". In the same year, he sang his famous song "Crescent Moon" with Taiwanese actor Wang Yaoqing at the CCTV Mid-Autumn Festival Gala.

In 2022, he joined Hunan Satellite TV's "Time Concert" (时光音乐会) and sang "Don't Cry, Friend" (朋友別哭).

On March 4–5, 2023, Fong held his 40th anniversary concert "Lui Fong CLASSIC 40 Concert" at the Hong Kong Coliseum.
