= Spiritual Love (film) =

1987 Hong Kong film by David Lai and Taylor Wong

- Film poster
- Traditional Chinese: 鬼新娘
- Simplified Chinese: 鬼新娘
- Hanyu Pinyin: Guǐ Xīn Niáng
- Jyutping: Gwai2 San1 Neong4
- Directed by: David Lai; Taylor Wong
- Written by: Stephen Siu
- Produced by: Johnny Mak
- Starring: Chow Yun-fat; Cherie Chung; Pauline Wong; Deanie Ip
- Cinematography: Jingle Ma; Derek Wan
- Edited by: A Chik; Ma Chung-yiu; Chiu Cheuk-man
- Music by: Joseph Chan
- Production companies: Golden Harvest; Johnny Mak Productions
- Distributed by: Golden Harvest
- Release date: 15 October 1987
- Running time: 85 minutes
- Country: Hong Kong
- Language: Cantonese
- Box office: HK$37,098,000 ($4.735.088 USD)

Spiritual Love, also known as Ghost Bride or The Phantom Bride, is a 1987 Hong Kong fantasy comedy film directed by David Lai and Taylor Wong and starring Chow Yun-fat, Cherie Chung, Pauline Wong and Deanie Ip.

In the film, a man offers years of his own life to release a female ghost from the afterlife. He proceeds to reject his unfaithful girlfriend, and to start a romantic relationship with the ghost. His former girlfriend kills herself in a failed attempt to reclaim his affection. The girlfriend returns as a vengeful ghost, and the other female ghost has to sacrifice herself in order to rescue her lover.

== Plot ==
A man named Pu Yung-tsai lives with his cousin who is a student of Feng shui and Maoshan. Yung-tsai buys an antique desk from a second-hand shop and inside is a suicide letter written by a young woman called Wei Hsiao-tieh. Yung-tsai replies to the letter and gives up 3 years of his life, so the woman is able to come back to Earth as a ghost and get away from her forced marriage in the afterlife. When Yung-tsai splits up with his girlfriend, May, because he caught her having an affair, he begins a relationship with Hsiao-tieh. May wants to get back together with Yung-tsai because her rich boyfriend has dumped her and she is pregnant. She stages a fake suicide attempt to win back Yung-tsai but it backfires and she dies.

May then returns as a ghost in a night club and Yung-tsai, his cousin, his cousin's mentor and his friend attempt to get rid of her spirit. She chases them all around the club trying to kill them. Hsiao-tieh makes a deal with her husband to go back to him, if he will save Yung-tsai and his friends. The husband then turns up and consumes May's ghost before returning to his own realm with Hsiao-tieh.

== Cast ==
- Chow Yun-fat as Pu Yung-tsai
- Cherie Chung as Wei Hsiao-tieh
- Pauline Wong as May
- Deanie Ip as Sai Chin-hua
- Hon Yee-sang as King Ghost
- Alex Ng as Pu's deaf-mute friend
- Paul Chun as Pu's boss
- Luk Yik-sang
- Luk Ying-hung as policeman
- Yu Kwok-lok as hotel manager
- Fung Yuen-chi as gangster
- Kan Tat-wah as bodyguard
- Fan Wing-wah as thug
- Lee Hang as Taoist
- Hung San-nam as bodyguard
- Jackson Ng as bodyguard
- Tang Chiu-yau as bodyguard
- Wong Wai-fai as bodyguard

== Accolades ==
Accolades
Ceremony	Category	Recipient	Outcome
8th Hong Kong Film Awards	Best Supporting Actress	Deanie Ip	Nominated

== Home media ==
=== VHS ===
Release date	Country	Classifaction	Publisher	Format	Language	Subtitles	Notes	REF
14 August 2001	United States	Unknown	Tai Seng Entertainment	NTSC	Cantonese	English		

=== VCD ===
Release date	Country	Classifaction	Publisher	Format	Language	Subtitles	Notes	REF
Unknown	Hong Kong	N/A	Deltamac (HK)	NTSC	Cantonese, Mandarin	English, Chinese	2VCDs	
12 July 2005	Hong Kong	N/A	Universe Laser (HK)	NTSC	Cantonese, Mandarin	English, Traditional Chinese	2VCDs	
1 June 2006	Hong Kong	N/A	Joy Sales(HK)	NTSC	Cantonese, Mandarin	English, Traditional Chinese	2VCDs	

=== DVD ===
Release date	Country	Classifaction	Publisher	Format	Region	Language	Sound	Subtitles	Notes	REF
1 January 2000	Hong Kong	N/A	Universe Laser (HK)	NTSC	ALL	Cantonese, Mandarin	Unknown	English, Traditional Chinese, Japanese, Korean, French		
24 March 2000	Japan	N/A	Pioneer LDC	NTSC	2	Cantonese	Unknown	English, Traditional Chinese, Japanese, Simplified Chinese		
17 July 2001	United States	N/A	Tai Seng	NTSC	ALL	Cantonese	Dolby	English		
13 July 2003	Hong Kong	N/A	Joy Sales (HK)	NTSC	ALL	Cantonese, Mandarin	Dolby Digital 2.0	English, Traditional Chinese, Simplified Chinese		
