= The Unwritten Law (1985 film) =

Hong Kong drama film by Ng See-yuen

- DVD cover
- Traditional Chinese: 法外情
- Simplified Chinese: 法外情
- Hanyu Pinyin: Fǎ Wài Qíng
- Jyutping: Faat3 Ngoi6 Cing4
- Directed by: Ng See-yuen
- Written by: Ng See-yuen
- Produced by: Ng See-yuen
- Starring: Andy Lau; Deanie Ip
- Cinematography: Ma Koon Wah
- Edited by: Poon Hung
- Music by: Tang Siu Lam
- Distributed by: Seasonal Film Corporation
- Release date: 26 September 1985
- Running time: 102 minutes
- Country: Hong Kong
- Language: Cantonese
- Box office: HK$11,618,066

The Unwritten Law is a 1985 Hong Kong trial drama film directed by written, produced and directed by Ng See-yuen and starring Andy Lau and Deanie Ip. The film was a critical and commercial success and was followed by two sequels, The Truth (1988) and The Truth Final Episode (1989). Because the film and its subsequent two sequels displayed a touching mother and son love, Deanie Ip earned the nickname "Andy Lau's mother".

== Plot ==
Raymond Lau grew up in the Dean Maria's orphanage. He is an honors graduate from the University of London School of Law, specializing in criminal law, who just obtained a law license and is returning to Hong Kong for his career. Raymond's fiancée's family also has a background in law. At this time a case occurred, an over 50-year-old prostitute Lau Wai Lan is suspected of killing the son of a dignitary rich client. No one is willing to defend her, and she wants to die. People are not optimistic that the work ethic and sense of justice is still driving. Raymond Lautook over the case.

Raymond Lau, through Old Kwan's help, searches for evidence everywhere — the truth gradually unraveling the case. He is opposed by the father of his fiancée, and the relationship with his fiancée gradually goes down. In an accident, Wai Lan saw Raymond Lau has a pocket watch with "bright future" engraved on it, a gift that she gave her son many years back. She finds out Raymond Lau was her son whom she took to Dean Maria's orphanage. Wai Lan has not abandoned Raymond Lau : She became a dancer, anonymously cared for Raymond Lau , and paid for his tuition and summons for the University of London School of Law. Wan Lan worried about the exposure of her identity would ruin Raymond Lau's honor and identity; she refused to let Raymond Lau defend her.

Raymond Lau cannot accept that Wai Lan refused his defense. Wai Lan does not say anything but, under the persuasion of Old Kwan, Wai Lan finally agreed to let Raymond Lau defend her. Raymond Lau's logic clearly refutes, points out the contradiction of the allegations of witness, and the inference that the deceased is a sexual pervert. Raymond finds victims of sexual abuse — prostitutes — to testify based and looked for the victim's psychiatrist who testified. The psychiatrist, however, denied that the victim is his patient. Fortunately, one of Raymond Lau's orphanage mates, Tang Siu Fan, who is a nurse of the clinic, agrees to testify and comes up with the medical records evidence that the victim is indeed his patient.

Prosecutor summoned Maria, the retired orphanage director, to testify in court about Wai Lan and Raymond Lau's mother and son relationship. According to the British statutes and regulations there shall not have such kinship between lawyer and client, asking the judge to immediately revoke the litigation. However, Mary firmly denies Wai Lan and Raymond Lau's mother and son relationship. The consent of the jury, the judge ruled that Wai Lan was harassed by her client and killed him under self-defense. At the end, Raymond Lau still does not know that Wai Lan is his birth mother.

== Cast ==
- Andy Lau as Barrister Raymond Lau
- Deanie Ip as Lau Wai Lan
- Yammie Lam as Annie, Raymond Lau's girlfriend
- Joann Tang as Tang Siu Fan
- Lau Siu Ming as Old Kwan, Raymond's adviser
- Paul Chun as Chief Public Prosecutor Yim Yat Kong
- Lai Suen as Sister Yung
- Staurt Ong as Tsang Wing Lim, the murdered client
- Wong Wai as Barrister Law
- Andy Tai
- Chan Yau Hau as Boss Tsang
- Joseph Lee as Lawyer Ting
- Kam Biu
- Chan Yuet Yue
- Yau Lai Fong
- Hon Lai Fan
- Ng Yip Kwong
- Felix Lok
- Peter Macintosh as Judge
- Elainor Johnson as Nun
- Lung Cheuk
- Cheung Sak Au as Uncle Wong
- Leung Chi

== Award nominations ==
5th Hong Kong Film Awards

- Nominated: Best Screenplay (Ng See-yuen)
- Nominated: Best Actress (Deanie Ip)

== Box office ==
The film grossed HK$11,618,066 at the Hong Kong box office in its theatrical run from 26 September to 16 October 1985 in Hong Kong.
