= Yiu Wai =

Hong Kong actress

- 姚煒
- Born: 1948 (age 77–78); Shanghai, China
- Other names: Kelly Yao Wei, Wei Yao, Kelly Yao, Yao Wei
- Occupation: Actress
- Years active: 1981–1994

Yiu Wai (Chinese: 姚煒; pinyin: Yáo Wěi; Jyutping: Jiu4 Wai5) is a Chinese actress from Hong Kong. Yiu is credited with over 15 films.

== Early life ==
Yiu Wai was born in 1948, the eldest in a family of seven. Her father was a tailor and came to Hong Kong in the 1950s. Yiu Wai stayed in Shanghai with two of her siblings and came to Hong Kong later and worked in garment manufacturing in her youth. She was gifted in music and began her singing career in the 1970s.

== Relationships and marriage ==
In 1978, Yiu Wai was in a relationship with Cecil Chao. Their daughter is Gigi Chao.

== Filmography ==
=== Films ===
This is a partial list of films.

- 1981 Gui ma zhi duo xing (aka All the Wrong Clues for the Right Solution) – Mrs. Yummy
- 1982 Oi yan nui san (aka My Darling, My Goddess) – Alice / Susie
- 1990 Yu zhong long (aka Dragon in Jail)
- 1992 Naked Killer (aka Chik loh go yeung) – Sister Cindy
- 1994 Deng ai de nu ren (aka Right Here Waiting) – Da Jia Jie
