= Deanie Ip =

Hong Kong singer and actress

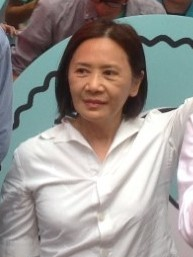
- Ip in 2016
- Born: 25 December 1947 (age 78); British Hong Kong
- Occupations: Singer; actress
- Awards: Volpi Cup; Best Actress; 2011 A Simple Life; Hong Kong Film Awards – Best Actress; 2012 A Simple Life; Best Supporting Actress; 1985 My Name Ain't Suzie; 1991 Dances with Dragon; 2018 Our Time Will Come Hong Kong Film Critics Society Awards – Best Actress; 2011 A Simple Life Golden Horse Awards – Best Actress; 2011 A Simple Life; Best Supporting Actress; 1981 Cream Soda and Milk; 1999 Crying Heart

Chinese name
- Traditional Chinese: 葉德嫻
- Simplified Chinese: 叶德娴
Transcriptions
Standard Mandarin
- Hanyu Pinyin: Yè Déxián
Yue: Cantonese
- Jyutping: jip6 dak1 haan4
- Musical career
- Origin: Hong Kong
- Genres: Cantopop
- Label: Universal Music Group

Deanie Ip (Note: Deanie Ip is frequently referred to as Deanie Yip although her surname is officially romanised as Ip.) (born 25 December 1947) is a Hong Kong singer and actress. Ip released her debut EP Deanie Ip in 1969 before shifting her focus to live performances. She returned to recording in the early 1980s and went on to release several hit songs, but largely stepped away from the music industry in the late 1980s and 1990s to concentrate on film acting. She resumed her singing career in the early 2000s; in 2004, she won the Ultimate Song Award at the Ultimate Song Chart Awards for her duet “Beauty Remains” (美中不足) with Andy Hui, and in 2014 she participated in the ensemble recording of “Raise the Umbrella” (撐起雨傘) in support of the Umbrella Movement. In 2019, she was blacklisted in mainland China for supporting Hong Kong’s pro-democracy protests, with her music removed from streaming services.

As an actor, Ip is acclaimed for her portrayals of grassroots characters. For her performance in the 2011 film A Simple Life, she won nine Best Actress awards, including at the 68th Venice International Film Festival, the 48th Golden Horse Awards, the 6th Asian Film Awards, and the 31st Hong Kong Film Awards. She has also won the Hong Kong Film Award for Best Supporting Actress three times and the Golden Horse Award for Best Supporting Actress twice.

== Music career ==
In the 1980s, Ip released five albums with a local producer. After complaining about the direction of the Cantopop industry and falling out with her then label, Black and White, Ip chose to retire from music in 1988 and went into semi-retirement, with occasional roles in movies. She returned to the Cantopop scene in 2002 with an EP, which, along with a live recording of her 2002 concert in Hong Kong, were both released by Universal Music Group. In the mid-90s, she teamed up with male star Andy Hui to produce the hit duet "教我如何不愛他" (lit. "Teach me how not to love him") and again in 2004 for the award-winner "美中不足" (lit. "A minor defect in something otherwise perfect").

== Film career and recognition ==
Ip has been recognised on several occasions, including in A Simple Life, for which she won Coppa Volpi for the Best Actress at the 68th Venice International Film Festival. Hong Kong Secretary for Commerce & Economic Development Gregory So congratulated her for winning the award, stating the award was not only an international recognition of her outstanding achievement, but a testimony of the level of excellence of the Hong Kong film industry. A Simple Life marked the 10th collaboration between Ip and Andy Lau, with whom she first star in The Unwritten Law in 1985.

Ip has twice won Best Supporting Actress in the Hong Kong Film Awards for her roles in Dances with Dragon (11th Hong Kong Film Awards, 1991), and in My Name Ain't Suzy (5th Hong Kong Film Awards, 1985). She has also been nominated as Best Supporting Actress on three times occasions: Wrong Wedding Trail (4th Hong Kong Film Awards, 1984), Spiritual Love (7th Hong Kong Film Awards, 1987) and Murder (13th Hong Kong Film Awards, 1993).

She has also won Best Supporting Actress at the 36th Golden Horse Awards for Crying Heart (2012).

Before filming A Simple Life, Ip had a 12-year hiatus from acting, about the hiatus she stated “I was viewed by some in the business as a disobedient actress who loves to play the role of a director on set. I am also not great at networking. I guess these are the reasons why I haven’t been offered a lot of work."

== Politics ==
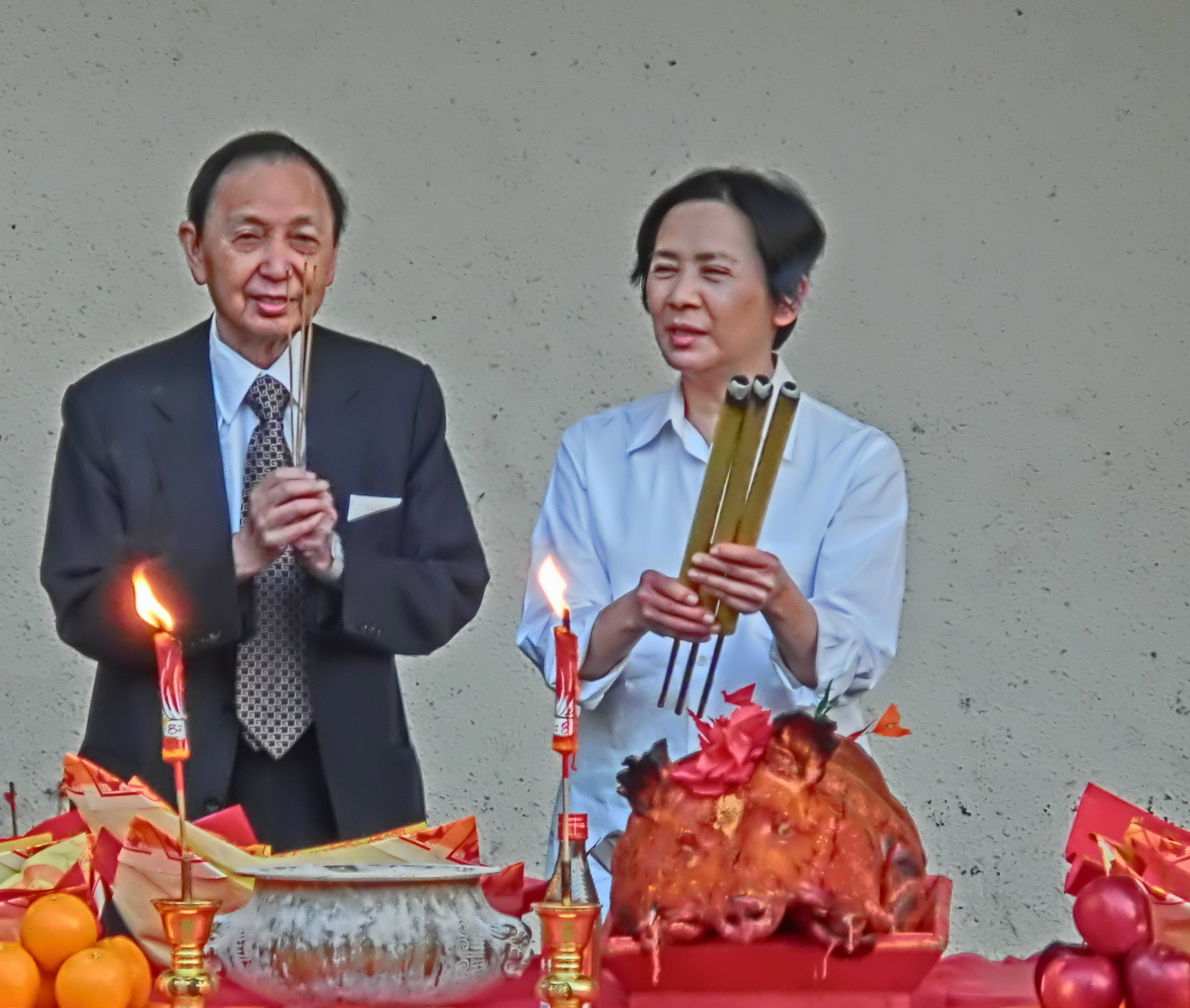
Ip alongside concert promoter Cheung Yiu-wing.

Ip participated in Hong Kong's 2014 Umbrella Movement, where protesters demanded electoral reform from the government. She was involved in recording Denise Ho's Cantopop song "Raise the Umbrella" (撐起雨傘). The song had been described as an inspiring anthem for the pro-democracy movement. During the 2016 Hong Kong legislative election campaign, Ip expressed her support for activist Nathan Law and stated, "I believe that this young man does everything he does for Hong Kong, and for his generation."

In 2019, Ip joined the pro-democracy demonstrations during the 2019–20 Hong Kong protests. Ip was one of few Hong Kong celebrities to voice support for the protesters, leading to her songs being removed from Mainland China's music streaming platforms. Untroubled by the loss of this income stream, she continued to voice her admiration for the young protestors.

== Filmography ==
| Year | Title | Role | Notes/Ref. |
|---|---|---|---|
| 1978 | Killers Two | | |
| 1978 | Jing wang shuang xiong | | |
| 1979 | Lin Ya Zhen lao hu yu xia xie | Madam policewoman | |
| 1980 | Dangerous Encounters of the First Kind | Police Officer | |
| 1981 | The Executor | | |
| 1981 | Love Massacre | | |
| 1981 | Cream Soda and Milk | | Won – Golden Horse Awards for Best Supporting Actress |
| 1981 | Sealed with a Kiss | | |
| 1982 | Carry On Pickpocket | Inspector Ling | |
| 1982 | Mo deng za chai | | |
| 1982 | Love | | |
| 1983 | Di yi ba jiao yi | | |
| 1984 | Pom Pom | Anna | |
| 1984 | Wrong Wedding Trail | | Nominated – Hong Kong Film Award for Best Actress |
| 1984 | The Return of Pom Pom | Anna | |
| 1984 | Before Dawn | | |
| 1984 | The Owl vs Bombo | Joyce Leung | |
| 1985 | Mr. Boo Meets Pom Pom | Anna | |
| 1985 | Welcome | Great-Grandfather's Wife | |
| 1985 | Goodbye Mama | | |
| 1985 | Twinkle, Twinkle, Lucky Stars | Person at the end #18 | |
| 1985 | The Unwritten Law | Lau Wai-lan | Nominated – Hong Kong Film Award for Best Actress |
| 1985 | My Name Ain't Suzie | Wong Ying | Won – Hong Kong Film Award for Best Supporting Actress; Nominated – Golden Horse Awards for Best Supporting Actress |
| 1985 | Seven Angels | Sergeant | |
| 1986 | The Lunatics | Tina Lau | |
| 1986 | Zai jian ma mi | Liza | |
| 1986 | Pom Pom Strikes Back | Anna | |
| 1986 | Soul | Lee Yip-Cheong | |
| 1986 | The Story of Dr. Sun Yat-Sen | | |
| 1987 | Spiritual Love | Chin-Hua | Nominated – Hong Kong Film Award for Best Supporting Actress |
| 1988 | Dragons Forever | Miss Yip | |
| 1988 | The Truth | Lau Wai Lan | |
| 1988 | Fat lut mo ching | Siu Yuk-Fong | |
| 1989 | Carry on Yakuza!! | Mrs. Wong | |
| 1989 | The Truth: Final Episode | | |
| 1991 | Fantasy Romance | Ghost Prostitute | |
| 1991 | Dances with Dragon | Shi-Yi / Baby | Won – Hong Kong Film Award for Best Supporting Actress |
| 1992 | Fight Back to School II | Inspector Yip | Nominated – Hong Kong Film Award for Best Supporting Actress |
| 1992 | Arrest the Restless | Teddy's Mother | |
| 1992 | The Prince of Temple Street | Phoenix | |
| 1992 | Deadly Dream Woman | Witch Woman | |
| 1992 | She Starts the Fire | Big Beer | |
| 1992 | Handsome Siblings | Sissy To | |
| 1993 | Murder | Ma Mei-Chun | Nominated – Golden Horse Awards for Best Supporting Actress; Nominated – Hong Kong Film Award for Best Supporting Actress |
| 1993 | Days of Tomorrow | Ling's Mother | |
| 1993 | Man of the Times | Mary | |
| 1994 | The New Legend of Shaolin | Red Bean's Mother | |
| 1995 | Tragic Commitment | Ngank | |
| 1996 | Thanks for Your Love | Mrs. Li | |
| 1999 | Criss-Cross Over Four Seas | Ming Sing | TV movie |
| 1999 | Prince Charming | 'Babe' Fei | |
| 1999 | Crying Heart | Mrs. Fat | Won – Golden Horse Awards for Best Supporting Actress |
| 2000 | Don't Look Back... Or You'll Be Sorry!! | Marianne Siu | |
| 2000 | Queen of Kowloon | Ah Si | |
| 2011 | A Simple Life | Chung Chun-tao | Won – Coppa Volpi for the Best Actress; Won – Tallinn Black Nights Film Festival Jury Prize for Best Actress; Won – Hong Kong Film Critics Society Awards for Best Actress; Won – Golden Horse Award for Best Leading Actress; Won – Asian Film Award for Best Actress; Won – Hong Kong Film Award for Best Actress; Won – Hong Kong Film Critics Society Awards for Best Actress; Won – Hong Kong Salento International Film Festival for Salento Award; Won – Chinese Film Media Awards for Best Actress; Nominated – Boston Society of Film Critics Award for Best Actress(runner-up) |
| 2011 | No Regret | | |
| 2013 | A Complicated Story | Gypsy | |
| 2013 | The Intruder | | |
| 2017 | Our Time Will Come | Mrs. Fong | Won – Hong Kong Film Award for Best Supporting Actress; Nominated – Golden Horse Award for Best Supporting Actress |
| 2025 | Ballad of a Small Player | Grandma | |
