= People's Hero (film) =

1987 Hong Kong film by Derek Yee

- Film poster
- Traditional Chinese: 人民英雄
- Simplified Chinese: 人民英雄
- Hanyu Pinyin: Rēnmēn Yīngxióng
- Jyutping: Jan4 man4 jing1 hung4
- Directed by: Derek Yee
- Written by: Derek Yee; Keith Lee; Kwan Yiu-wing
- Produced by: John Shum
- Starring: Ti Lung; Tony Leung Chiu-wai; Tony Leung Ka-fai; Elaine Jin; Paul Chun; Bowie Lam; Ronald Wong
- Cinematography: Wilson Chan
- Edited by: Ma Chung-yiu
- Music by: Lowell Lo
- Production companies: Long Shong Pictures; Maverick Films
- Distributed by: Maverick Films
- Release date: 3 December 1987
- Running time: 82 minutes
- Country: Hong Kong
- Language: Cantonese
- Box office: HK$3,983,421

People's Hero is a 1987 Hong Kong thriller film written and directed by Derek Yee and starring Ti Lung. The film was nominated for three Hong Kong Film Awards, where Tony Leung Chiu-wai and Elaine Jin won the Best Supporting Actor and Best Supporting Actress awards respectively, while Ronald Wong was nominated in the former category as well.

== Plot ==
The film is about a bank robbery that goes wrong.

== Cast ==
- Ti Lung as Sunny Koo, ex-con gangster
- Tony Leung Chiu-wai as Sai
- Tony Leung Ka-fai as Captain Chan, hostage negotiator
- Elaine Jin as Lotus
- Siu-Fong Lai
- Paul Chun as Captain Cheung
- Bowie Lam as K.W. Poon
- Ronald Wong as William Wong (Boney)
- Sabrina Ho as Bank customer
- Benz Kong as Bank customer
- Jessie Lee as Bank customer

== Awards and nominations ==
Awards and nominations
Ceremony	Category	Recipient	Outcome
7th Hong Kong Film Awards	Best Supporting Actor	Tony Leung Chiu-wai	Won
7th Hong Kong Film Awards	Best Supporting Actor	Ronald Wong	Nominated
7th Hong Kong Film Awards	Best Supporting Actress	Elaine Jin	Won
Golden Horse Awards	Best Actor	Ti Lung	Nominated
Golden Horse Awards	Best Supporting Actress	Elaine Jin	Nominated
