= Gigi Chao =

Hong Kong prominent lesbian

- Born: Gigi Chao; British Hong Kong
- Citizenship: China (HK)
- Education: Manchester School of Architecture
- Occupation: Vice Chairman of Cheuk Nang (Holdings) Ltd.
- Partner: JW
- Parent(s): Cecil Chao (father); Kelly Yiu, Wai (mother)
Gigi Chao
- Traditional Chinese: 趙式芝
- Simplified Chinese: 赵式芝
Transcriptions
Standard Mandarin
- Hanyu Pinyin: Zhào Shìzhì
- Wade–Giles: Chao Shih-zhi

Gigi Chao (Chinese: 趙式芝; born 23 June 1979) is a Hong Kong business woman and activist, the vice-chair of Cheuk Nang (Holdings) Ltd.

== Education ==
Chao holds a Bachelor of Arts in Architecture with Honours from the Manchester School of Architecture, jointly administered by the University of Manchester and the Manchester Metropolitan University.

== Work and activism ==
Chao, a feminist and lesbian, is an outspoken advocate for LGBT rights in Hong Kong and Asia. She was the first female President of the Hong Kong Aviation Club. She was also an early investor in Tesla and supported the company's early development in Hong Kong with purchasing two of the first generation Tesla Roadsters in 2011.

In 2019, Chao founded the organisation Hong Kong Marriage Equality to advocate for the legalisation of same-sex marriage in Hong Kong. Chao wrote an early thesis on marriage equality and published it for peer review in 2011–2012.

== Personal life ==
In 2012, Chao gained international attention when her father, Cecil Chao, offered $65 million to any man who could marry her. Despite criticism, her father remained unrepentant. In 2014 Cecil Chao increased the reward to $180 million. Gigi responded publicly in an open letter printed in the South China Morning Post. The letter expresses defiance of her father's wishes and asks for respect for the LGBT community.

She is an Anglican.
