= Cherie Chung =

Hong Kong actress (born 1960)

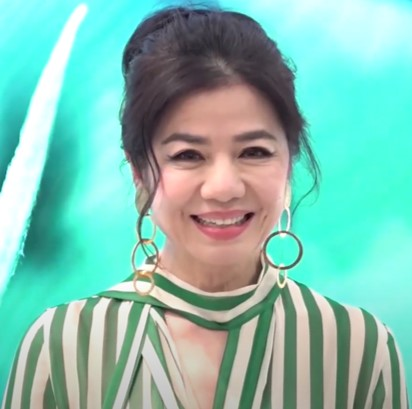
- Chung attending a brand event in April 2019
- Born: Chung Chor-hung; 16 February 1960 (age 66); British Hong Kong
- Citizenship: British
- Occupation: Actress
- Years active: 1973–1994
- Spouse: Michael Chu Ka-ting (m. 1991; died 2007)
- Awards: Asia Pacific Film Festival; Best Actress; 1984 Hong Kong, Hong Kong; Asia Pacific Film Festival; Best Actress; 1987 An Autumn's Tale

Chinese name
- Traditional Chinese: 鍾楚紅
- Simplified Chinese: 钟楚红
Transcriptions
Standard Mandarin
- Hanyu Pinyin: Zhōng Chǔ Hóng
Yue: Cantonese
- Jyutping: Chung Cho Hung

Cherie Chung Chor-hung (Chinese: 鍾楚紅; Jyutping: zung1 co2 hung4; born 16 February 1960) is a retired Hong Kong film actress. Of Hakka ancestry, she was one of the top actresses in Hong Kong film during the 1980s.

== Background ==
Chung participated in the 1979 Miss Hong Kong competition and came in 3rd runner-up. She was later discovered by film director Johnnie To and debuted in his first film The Enigmatic Case (1980).

Her beauty and charm led her to become one of the top actresses in Hong Kong at the time. In her film career, one of her most famous performances was in Mabel Cheung's An Autumn's Tale (1987), where she portrayed Jennifer, an educated middle-class woman who falls in love with a rude and uneducated man played by Chow Yun-fat. She is known as the "Marilyn Monroe of Hong Kong" and the Chinese entertainment industry due to her beauty. Chung retired from acting in the 1990s. Her last film was John Woo's Once a Thief (1991).

She married advertising executive Michael Chu Ka-ting in 1991. Chu died of cancer in August 2007.

She is also very active in promoting environmental protection as a supporter of Friend of the Earth (HK) since the early 1990s.

== Filmography ==
=== Film ===
Year	Title	Role	Notes
1980	The Enigmatic Case	Yao Puipui	
1981	The Story of Woo Viet	Shum Ching	
1982	The Postman Strikes Back	Guihua	
1982	It Takes Two		
1982	The Dead and the Deadly	Miss Yuen	
1982	Eclipse		Nominated—Hong Kong Film Award for Best Actress
1983	Twinkle Twinkle Little Star		
1983	Winners and Sinners	Shirley	
1983	Salt and Pepper		
1983	Hong Kong Playboys	Mei	
1983	Hong Kong, Hong Kong	Man Si Sun	Nominated—Hong Kong Film Award for Best Actress; Nominated—Golden Horse Award for Best Actress
1983	Descendant of the Sun	Princess	
1984	Heaven Can Help	Cathy	
1984	Maybe It's Love		
1984	Prince Charming	Yuk Duk-mei	
1984	My Darling Genie		
1984	The Hidden Power of the Dragon Sabre		
1984	Banana Cop	Amy	
1984	Cher, Last Victory	Cherie Teng	
1985	The Flying Mr. B		
1985	Women		
1985	Fascinating Affairs	Diana	
1985	The Spring Outside the Fence	Li Lin	
1986	Happy Ding Dong	Din-Din	
1986	Peking Opera Blues	Sheung Hung	
1987	Double Fixation		
1987	Goodbye Darling	Josephine	
1987	Spiritual Love	Wei Hsiao-Tieh	
1987	Spooky Kama Sutra		
1987	An Autumn's Tale	Jennifer	Nominated—Hong Kong Film Award for Best Actress; Nominated—Golden Horse Award for Best Actress
1988	Moon, Stars & Sun	GiGi	
1988	One Husband Too Many	Frances	
1988	The Yuppie Fantasia		
1988	Fatal Love	Cecilia Yau Tai-Kam	
1988	Couples, Couples, Couples	Mary Huang	
1988	Walk on Fire	Miss Chung	
1988	Bet on Fire	Hung	
1988	Carry on Hotel		
1988	18 Times		
1988	Golden Swallow	Hsiao-Hsueh / Lu Hsiao-Ping	
1988	The Eight Happiness	Beautiful	
1988	The Good, the Bad and the Beauty	Ko Sau-Ping	
1988	Chaos by Design		
1988	Mr. Mistress	Ho's girlfriend	
1988	Golden Years	Chu So-So	
1988	Last Romance		
1989	Diary of a Small Man		
1989	Wild Search	Cher	Nominated—Golden Horse Award for Best Actress
1989	Happy Together		
1989	Stars & Roses		
1991	Zodiac Killers	Mang Tit Lan	
1991	Once a Thief	Red Bean	

=== Television ===
- Floating Clouds (1981) (RTHK television series "Hong Kong, Hong Kong", no. 1)
