= Rich and Famous (1987 film) =

1987 Hong Kong film by Taylor Wong

- DVD cover
- Directed by: Taylor Wong
- Written by: Stephen Siu; Manfred Wong
- Produced by: Johnny Mak
- Starring: Chow Yun-fat; Andy Lau; Alex Man; Alan Tam; Pauline Wong; Carina Lau; Danny Lee; Ko Chun-hsiung
- Cinematography: Johnny Koo; Abdul M. Rumjahn; Derek Wan
- Edited by: Ma Chung-yiu
- Music by: Chan Wing-Leung
- Distributed by: Win's Film Production Co. Ltd. Gala Film Distribution Limited
- Release date: 28 May 1987
- Country: Hong Kong
- Language: Cantonese
- Budget: HK$21,014,608

Rich and Famous (Chinese: 江湖情; Jyutping: gong1 wu4 cing4; Cantonese Yale: Gong woo ching) is a 1987 Hong Kong action-crime film directed by Taylor Wong, and starring Chow Yun-fat, Andy Lau, Alex Man, and Alan Tam. The film was concluded by a sequel, Tragic Hero which was also released in 1987. The film is also known as Black Vengeance.

== Plot ==
In 1967, Yung and his best friend Kwok get into a fight with the local gang running the gambling hall after Yung runs up a large gambling debt. With the help of Yung's sister Wai-chui, another powerful gangster named Lee Ah-chai bails them out and offers them jobs working for him.

Four years later, Kwok and Yung have advanced in Ah-chai's gang and their sister Wai-chui is now Lee Ah-chai's housekeeper.

Ah-chai has been hiding his friend Fan, who has become gravely ill. Fan apparently has crossed the Thailand drug lords and has now stopped any drug shipments to Hong Kong. This draws the ire of the other gangs who demand that Ah-chai kill or turn in Fan. Ah-chai explains that he owes Fan a personal debt and to turn him in would mean dishonor.

Yung meets secretly with rival gang leader Chu Lo-tai and is paid to kill Fan. Yung shows up at Fan's location and kills him and the guard. Yung then is called to Ah-chai's office. Ah-chai says that he knows that Yung killed Fan and asks his henchman, Number 6 to kill Yung. Kwok barges into the room and begs for Yung's life. Ah-chai shoots Yung in the hand and tells them both to get lost.

Kwok and Yung have a falling out over Yung's behavior. Chu Lo-tai attempts to kill Kwok using gasoline and guns. Kwok hides out with his cousin Mak.

Lee Ah-chai meets with Kwok and Mak after Yung's attack and they become friends again. Ah-chai invites them to his upcoming wedding.

At the wedding occurs, Yung's men ambush Ah-chai on the steps and shoot Ah-chai's fiance. Mak runs Yung down and beats him with a fender. Yung shoots him in the chest. Yung runs and is caught by police. Ah-chai thanks Mak for all he has done as he passes away.

== Cast ==
- Chow Yun-fat as Lee Ah-chai
- Andy Lau as Lam Ting-kwok
- Alex Man as Tang Kar-yung
- Alan Tam as Mak Ying-hung
- Pauline Wong as Tang Wai-chiu
- Carina Lau as Lau Po-yee
- Danny Lee as Inspector Cheung
- Ko Chun-hsiung as Chu Lo-tai
- Shing Fui-On as Number 6

== Release ==
The film was released on Blu-ray in 2023.

== Reception ==
A retrospective review by Dark Side Reviews found that Rich and Famous to have flaws, such as finding the runtime too short to develop aspects of the story and characters, but found it to be a "good Triad film", praising the action sequences in particular.
