= Taylor Wong =

Hong Kong film director (1949 or 1950–2025)

Taylor Wong (Chinese: 黃泰來 (Mandarin: Huáng Tàilái / Cantonese: Wong Tai Lai); 1950 – 16 July 2025) was a Hong Kong film director.

== Life and career ==
Wong was the son of Cantonese film director Wong Yiu. He graduated from the Department of Journalism, National Cheng Kung University in Taiwan. In the 1970s and early 1980s, he worked as a film director at Commercial Television and Asia Television before joining Shaw Brothers Limited in 1980. Throughout his career, he directed a number of films, including Behind the Yellow Line (1984), Rich and Famous (1987), Tragic Hero (1987), Spiritual Love (1987), The Truth (1988), Triads: The Inside Story (1989), Stars and Roses (1989), No Risk, No Gain (1990), Kung Fu VS Acrobatic (1990), Fantasy Romance (1991), With or Without You (1992), No More Love, No More Death (1993) and The Three Swordsmen (1994).

On 16 July 2025, Wong died of throat cancer at the age of 75.
