= Alex Man =

Hong Kong actor

Alex Man Chi-leung
- Born: Hong Kong
- Occupation: Actor
- Years active: 1977–present
- Spouse(s): Tien Niu (1992–1996); Kwok Ming Lai (2002–)
- Awards: Golden Horse Awards – Best Actor; 1988 Gangland Odyssey

Chinese name
- Traditional Chinese: 萬梓良
- Simplified Chinese: 万梓良
Transcriptions
Standard Mandarin
- Hanyu Pinyin: Wàn Zǐliáng
Yue: Cantonese
- Jyutping: Maan^{6} Zi^{2}-loeng^{4}

Alexander Man Chi-leung (萬梓良) better known simply as Alex Man is a Hong Kong actor. Born in Hong Kong to Hakka parents, Alex Man became a television actor for ATV in the 1970s. He joined TVB in the 1980s where he starred in several popular television dramas. Man sang the Hakka song, "客家山歌最出名", during a Hong Kong TVB television show specially made for him. He received a Golden Horse Award.

== Filmography ==
=== Films ===
Year	Title	Role	Notes
1979	The Secret (瘋劫)	Yuen Si-cho	
1981	The Daring Age (I.Q. 爆棚)	Teacher Chow	
1981	Avengers from Hell (鬼域)	Sunny	
1982	My Beloved (花煞)		
1982	Buddha's Palm (如來神掌)	Gu Han-hun	
1983	Bastard Swordsman (天蠶變)	Dugu Wudi	
1983	Hong Kong, Hong Kong (男與女)	Kong Yuen-sang	
1984	Prince Charming (青蛙王子)	Joseph	
1984	New Tales of the Flying Fox (新飛狐外傳)	Miao Renfeng	
1984	Return of the Bastard Swordsman (布衣神相)	Dugu Wudi	
1984	Maybe It's Love (窺情)	Wan Jilang	
1984	The Little Cute Fellow (男女方程式)		
1984	Lust from Love of a Chinese Courtesan (愛奴新傳)	Lin Yun	
1984	The Hidden Power of the Dragon Sabre (魔殿屠龍)	Song Qingshu	
1984	An Amorous Woman of Tang Dynasty (唐朝豪放女)	Tsui Pok-hau	
1984	The Daring Kung-Fu Refugee (傻探出更)		
1984	Hong Kong 1941 (等待黎明)	Wong Hak-keung	
1984	Misfire (走火炮)		
1985	Journey of the Doom (水兒武士)	Shan	
1985	Lucky Diamond (祝您好運)	George	
1985	Let's Have a Baby (替槍老豆)	Peter Mui Te-sang	
1986	Brotherhood (兄弟)	Ah Keung	
1986	The Story of Dr. Sun Yat Sen (國父孫中山與開國英雄)		
1987	Long Arm of the Law II (省港旗兵續集兵分兩路)	Biggy	
1987	Rich and Famous (江湖情)	Tang Kar-yung	
1987	Killer's Nocturne (不夜天)	Yin Li-shan	
1987	Tragic Hero (英雄好漢)	Tang Kar-yung	
1987	The Big Brother (1哥)	Stephen See	
1988	Law or Justice? (法中情)	Fang Wei	
1988	Edge of Darkness (陷阱邊沿)		
1988	Mr. Possessed (撞邪先生)	Shen Zhihang	
1988	Ruthless Family (法律無情)		
1988	As Tears Go By (旺角卡門)	Tony	
1988	He Who Chases After the Wind (捕風漢子)		
1988	Rouge (胭脂扣)	Yuan Ting	
1988	One Way Ticket to Bangkok (勇闖毒龍潭)		
1988	Set Me Free! (我要逃亡)		
1988	Gangland Odyssey (大頭仔)	Ng Chun-sing	Won—Golden Horse Award for Best Actor
1989	China White (轟天龍虎會)	Bobby's father	
1989	Devil Hunters (獵魔群英)		
1989	Missing Man (都市獵人)	Yip Sai-cheung	
1989	Framed (沉底鱷)		
1989	Fight to Survive (我在江湖)		
1989	Crocodile Hunter (專釣大鱷)	Chuen Mak-yuen	
1989	Running Mate (追女重案組)		
1989	Armageddon (城市判官)		
1989	The Last Duel (再起風雲)		
1990	Fatal Recall (大哥大續集)	Liu Wuxiong	
1990	Young Soldier (少爺當大兵)		
1990	Best Friend of the Cops (豬標一族)	Jen Chin-hsing	
1990	The Figures from Earth (出土奇兵)	General Thunderbolt	
1990	Day of Thunder (金牌雙龍)		
1990	Big Brother (鐵漢柔情)	Lee Way	
1990	Fire Phoenix (橫衝直撞火鳳凰)		
1990	King of Gambler (賭王)	Paul	
1990	Gangland Odyssey (義膽雄心)	Fan Chi-hung	
1990	Return to Action (喋血風雲)	Man Yung-keung	
1990	Hong Kong Gigolo (香港舞男)		
1990	Fatal Passion (致命的誘惑)		
1990	The Sniping (奇兵)		
1990	The Dragon Fighter (地頭龍)		
1991	The Killer From China (禁海蒼狼)	Ann Sam	
1991	Yellow Rain (美國博仔)		
1991	The Godfather's Daughter Mafia Blues (烈火情仇)	Master Lee Wah-yu	
1991	Heroic Brothers (虎豹小子)		
1991	Bloody Hero (喋血奇兵)		
1991	All of the Gamblers (賭尊)	Ching's assistant	
1991	Phantom War (英倫越戰)		
1991	The Queen of Gamble (表姐,妳玩野!)	Lik	
1992	Bloody Revenge (風塵十三姨)	Superintendent	
1992	Casino Tycoon (賭城大亨)	Kwok Ying-nam	
1992	Casino Tycoon II (賭城大亨II之至尊無敵)	Kwok Ying-nam	
1992	The Mighty Gambler (勝者為王)		
1992	Super Lady Cop (超級女警)	Chiu Shiu	
1993	The Trail (大路)		
1993	He-Born to Kill (十大槍擊要犯之殺生狀元)		
1994	The Case of the Spirit of Banana (香蕉精奇案)	Detective Ma	
1995	Tough Beauty and the Sloppy Slop (怒海威龍)	Officer Man	
1997	Young and Dangerous 4 (97古惑仔戰無不勝)	Cheung Tin-yeung	
1998	Young and Dangerous 5 (98古惑仔之龍爭虎鬥)	Cheung Tin-yeung	
1999	The Conmen in Vegas (賭俠大戰拉斯維加斯)	Peter Chu	
2000	Born to Be King (勝者為王)	Cheung Tin-yeung	
2001	Fidelity (兄弟)		
2010	The Jade and the Pearl (翡翠明珠)	King of the West	
2010	Bruce Lee, My Brother (李小龍)	Ng Cho-fan	
2012	The Bounty (懸紅)	Innkeeper Sun	Nominated—Hong Kong Film Award for Best Supporting Actor
2013	Young and Dangerous: Reloaded (古惑仔:江湖新秩序)	Cheung Tin-yeung	
2019	Let's Go Home		
2019	I'm Livin' It	Lo Chun-keung	Nominated—Hong Kong Film Award for Best Supporting Actor
2022	Only Fools Rush In		

=== Television ===
Year,	Title	Role	Notes
1979	It Takes a Thief (俠盜風流)	Nam-kung Yat	
1980	Dynasty (大內群英)	Yongzheng Emperor	
1980	Dynasty II (大內群英續集)	Qianlong Emperor	
1980	Tai Chi Master (太極張三豐)	Zhang Sanfeng	
1983	The Return of the Condor Heroes (神鵰俠侶)	Luk Lap-ting	
1985	The Yang's Saga (楊家將)	Han Xiang	
1985	The Legend of the General Who Never Was (薛仁貴征東)	Xue Rengui	
1986	The Return of Luk Siu-fung (陸小鳳之鳳舞九天)	Luk Siu-fung	
1986	The Feud of Two Brothers (流氓大亨)		
1987	Genghis Khan (成吉思汗)	Genghis Khan	
1987	The Seasons (季節)		
1987	The Price of Growing Up (生命之旅)		
1988	And Yet We Live (當代男兒)		
1989	The Justice of Life (他來自江湖)		
1991	Big Family (大家族)		
1992	The Key Man (巨人)		
1992	The Thief of Time (群星會)		Cameo; Television film
1993	The Edge of Righteousness		
1995	Down Memory Lane (萬里長情)		
1995	The Golden Pillow (金枕頭)		
1996	Brave New World (新阿郎)		
1998	Riding the Storm (陌生人)		
2004	Magic Chef (伙頭智多星)	Supreme Taster Law Hon	Special guest appearance
2011	Invincible Knights Errant (七俠五義人間道)	Bao Zheng	
