= Shing Fui-On =

Hong Kong actor (1955–2009)

- Born: 1 February 1955; Sai Kung, British Hong Kong
- Died: 27 August 2009 (aged 54); Hong Kong Baptist Hospital, Hong Kong
- Other names: Dai Saw (大傻; lit. big fool)
- Occupation: Actor
- Years active: 1973–2009
- Height: 1.88 m (6 ft 2 in)

Chinese name
Transcriptions
Standard Mandarin
- Hanyu Pinyin: Chéng Kuí'ān
Yue: Cantonese
- Jyutping: sing4 fui1 on1

Signature
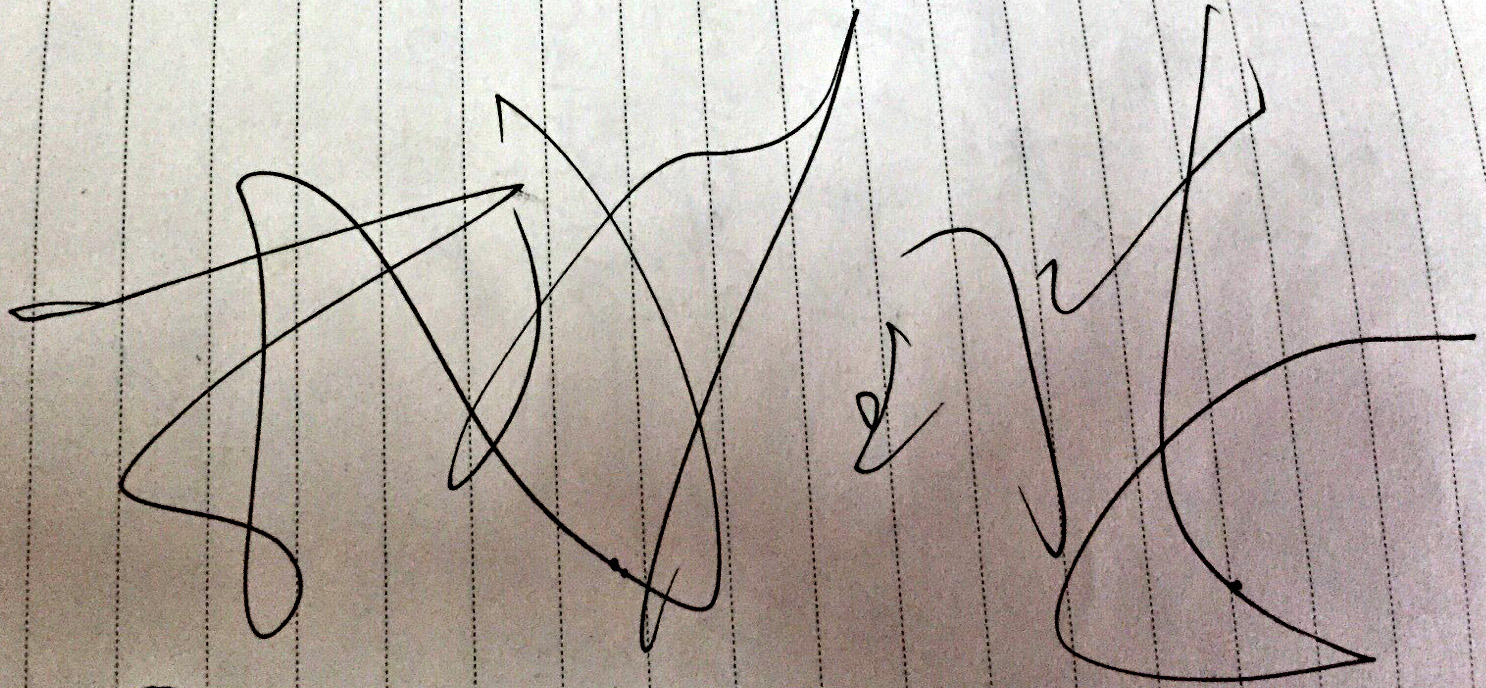

Shing Fui-on (Chinese: 成奎安; 1 February 1955 – 27 August 2009) was a Hong Kong actor, musician, and politician who appeared in over 230 films between 1974 and 2008. He was best known for acting in supporting roles opposite his real-life friend Chow Yun-Fat, and was twice nominated for the Hong Kong Film Award for Best Supporting Actor.

== Life and career ==
Shing was the fourth of five siblings in a Hakka family. Due to family poverty, Shing had to drop out of school at the age of 13. At the age of 15, he worked as an extra at Shaw Brothers, and later moved to Golden Harvest before working at a dance hall.

During his film career, Shing was famous for portraying villains and comedic characters, due to his large stature and deep and grumpy voice. Known for his tall stature and distinctive features, he was affectionately known by the nickname Dai Saw (大傻; literally "Big Head" or "Big Fool").

Shing often appeared as a supporting actor in films with Chow Yun-fat including A Better Tomorrow, A Better Tomorrow II, The Killer, Tiger on Beat, Prison on Fire, and God of Gamblers. His only lead role was in the 1991 film The Blue Jean Monster. His last feature film role was in the 2007 film The Detective.

He worked on a total of 95 feature films in over a four-year span (1988–1991) and earned over 230 credits during his career.

== Personal life ==
Shing was an original resident of Sai Kung's Nam Wai Village. In 2003, he was elected the village chief. In 2007, he was elected to the post for a fifth time.

=== Death ===
In October 2004, Shing discovered that he had been diagnosed with nasopharyngeal carcinoma, which had already reached his lungs. His condition stabilised after radiation and chemotherapy. However, his mouth was no longer able to produce saliva, and Shing was left with 20% hearing in his right ear. In 2008, Shing's condition worsened. While he had beaten the cancer, he also weighed less than 100 pounds. Shing died from complications from Hepatitis B resulting in liver cancer on 27 August 2009 at 11:45 p.m. at the Baptist Hospital in Kowloon.

In September 2023, Sing's son, Sing Yuk-man (head of Nam Wai village), was arrested for having 1kg of marijuana in his village house.
