= List of Hong Kong films of 1988 =

This article lists feature-length Hong Kong films released in 1988.

== Box office ==
The highest-grossing Hong Kong films released in 1988, by domestic box office gross revenue, are as follows:

Highest-grossing films released in 1988
Rank	Title	Domestic gross
1	The Eighth Happiness	HK$37,090,776
2	Police Story 2	HK$34,151,609
3	Dragons Forever	HK$33,578,920
4	Chicken and Duck Talk	HK$29,378,769
5	Tiger on the Beat	HK$27,865,158
6	It's a Mad, Mad, Mad World II	HK$25,814,268
7	Heart to Hearts	HK$24,676,380
8	The Greatest Lover	HK$23,566,173
9	The Crazy Companies	HK$21,822,756
10	The Diary of a Big Man	HK$19,419,539

== Releases ==
Title	Director	Cast	Genre	Notes
1988
18 Times	Joe Cheung	Cherie Chung, Kenny Bee, Eric Tsang, Lowell Lo, John Shum	Comedy / Drama	
Across The River	Chang Cheh			
Angel II	Teresa Woo	Moon Lee, Elaine Lui, Alex Fong	Action	Sequel to Angel (1987)
As Tears Go By	Wong Kar-wai	Andy Lau, Maggie Cheung, Jacky Cheung	Crime	Multiple Hong Kong Film Award nominations
Bed Companion	Cheung Ngan Ting			
Beloved Son Of God	Dick Cho			
Bet On Fire	Joe Cheung			
The Big Heat	Andrew Kam			
Bless This House	Ronny Yu			
Blood Call	Tung Liu	Max Mok, Kamiyama Anna, Maria Tung, Charlie Cho, Eddy Ko, Michael Chow		
Bloody Fight	Wilson Tong			
Border Line Story	Lau Hung Chuen			
Cherry Blossoms	Eddie Fong	Chow Yun-fat, Wong Yuk Ling	Drama	
Chicken and Duck Talk	Clifton Ko	Michael Hui, Ricky Hui, Sylvia Chang, Yan Pak, Ying-Ying Hui	Comedy / Drama	
City War	Sun Chung	Chow Yun-fat, Ti Lung	Action	
Carry On Hotel	Jeffrey Lau	Jacky Cheung, Kent Cheng, Cherie Chung, Eric Tsang, Joey Wong, Richard Ng	Comedy	
Couples, Couples, Couples	Cheung Ji Kok	Jacky Cheung, Cherie Chung	Comedy	
The Crazy Companies	Wong Jing	Andy Lau, Natalis Chan, Stanley Fung, Idy Chan, Chingmy Yau, Sandra Ng	Comedy	
The Crazy Companies II	Wong Jing	Andy Lau, Rosamund Kwan, Carol Cheng, Natalis Chan, Stanley Fung, Chingmy Yau, Sandra Ng, Lawrence Ng	Comedy	
Criminal Hunters	Frankie Chan	Danny Lee, Eric Tsang, Nina Li Chi, Dick Wei, Kwan Hoi-san, Shing Fui-On	Action	
Deadly Lovers		Leon Lai, Prudence Liew, David Siu, Teresa Carpio	Drama	
The Diary of a Big Man	Chor Yuen	Chow Yun-fat, Sally Yeh, Joey Wong, Waise Lee, Carrie Ng, Kent Cheng	Comedy	
Double Fattiness	David Chiang	Lydia Shum, Bill Tung, Eric Tsang, Maggie Cheung, Paul Chun	Comedy	
The Dragon Family	Lau Kar-wing	Andy Lau, Alan Tam, Max Mok	Action / Crime	
Dragons Forever	Sammo Hung, Corey Yuen	Jackie Chan, Sammo Hung, Yuen Biao, Yuen Wah	Action / Comedy / Drama	
Edge of Darkness	Fung Hak On	Alex Man, John Shum, Chin Siu-ho, Idy Chan, Lo Lieh, William Ho	Action / Drama	
The Eighth Happiness	Johnnie To	Chow Yun-fat, Jacky Cheung, Raymond Wong, Cherie Chung, Carol Cheng, Fung Bo Bo		
Faithfully Yours	Wong Wa Kei	Jacky Cheung, Max Mok, Stephen Chow, Sharla Cheung, Richard Ng, Lydia Shum	Comedy	
Final Justice	Parkman Wong	Danny Lee, Stephen Chow	Crime	
Fractured Follies	Wong Chung	Chow Yun-fat, Joey Wong, Nina Li Chi, Wong Jim	Romantic comedy	
Gangland Odyssey	Ulysses Au	Alex Man, Tien Niu	Drama	
Ghost in the House	Jamie Luk	Derek Yee, Carol Cheng, Nina Li Chi, Lawrence Cheng, Lo Hoi-pang	Comedy	
The Greatest Lover		Eric Tsang, Chow Yun-fat, Anita Mui, Shing Fui-On	Comedy	
Gunmen	Kirk Wong	Tony Leung Ka-fai, Adam Cheng, Waise Lee, Mark Cheng, Daid Wu, Elvis Tsui, Carrie Ng, Elizabeth Lee	Action / Drama	
Her Vengeance	Lam Ngai Kai	Pauline Wong Siu-Fung, Lam Ching-ying, Elaine Kam Yin-Ling	Crime	
Hero of Tomorrow	Poon Man Kit	Max Mok, Michael Miu	Crime	
How to Pick Girls Up!	Wong Jing	Eric Tsang, Maggie Cheung, Elizabeth Lee, Chingmy Yau, Sandra Ng, Wong Jing, Stanley Fung	Comedy	
I Love Maria	David Chung	John Shum, Sally Yeh, Tsui Hark, Tony Leung Chiu-Wai, Lam Ching-ying, Paul Chun	Sci-Fi / Comedy	
In the Blood	Corey Yuen	Andy Lau, Siu Hung Mui, Chin Siu-ho, Bil Tung, Wu ma, Corey Yien, Woo Kam, Sammo Hung, Richard Ng, Anthony Chan, Alfred Cheung, Meg Lam	Crime	
In the Line of Duty 3	Brandy Yuen, Arthur Wong	Cynthia Khan, Fujioka Hiroshi, Stuart Ong, Nishiwaki Michiko, Elliot Ngok, Dick Wei, Paul Chun	Action	
The Inspector Wears Skirts	Wellson Chin Sing-Wai			
King of Stanley Market	Jamie Luk	Richard Ng, Sylvia Chang, Lowell Lo, Lydia Shum, Charlie Chin, Elaine Jin, Derek Yee, Bowie Wu, Sandra Ng, Wong Jing	Comedy	
Lai Shi, China's Last Eunuch	Jacob Cheung	Max Mok, Irene Wan	Historical drama	
Law or Justice?	Taylor Wong	Carol Cheng, Alex Man, Joey Wong, Vincent Lam, Ti Lung, Prudence Liew, Paul Chun	Drama	
Love Soldier of Fortune	Stanley Fung	Alan Tam, Maggie Cheung, Stanley Fung, Natalis Chan, Sandra Ng, Michael Miu, Lee Heung-kam	Romance	
The Last Conflict	Raymond Lee	Donnie Yen, Stephen Chow, Francis Ng, Nadia Chan, Lau Kong		TV movie
Men Behind the Sun	Mou Tun-fei	Hsu Gou, Gang Wang, Andrew Yu	War drama	
Mistaken Identity	Tsui Siu Ming	Simon Yam, Richard Ng	Comedy	
Mother Vs Mother	Tommy Leung	Maggie Cheung, Jacky Cheung, Bill Tung, Lydia Shum, Tang Pik-wan	Comedy	
Mr. Possessed	Wong Jing	Kenny Bee, Carol Cheng, Natalis Chan, Tang Pik-wan, Chingmy Yau, Wong Jing, Alex Man, Lau Kar-wing, Francis Ng	Horror / Comedy	
One Husband Too Many	Anthony Chan	Kenny Bee, Anthony Chan, Cherie Chung, Anita Mui, Alfred Cheung, Pat Ha, Michael Chan, Bolo Yeung	Romantic comedy	
One Way Ticket to Bangkok	Lee Ting Lun	Alex Man, Alex To, Ellen Chan, Leon Lai, Pauline Yeung, Francis Ng, Kwan Hoi-san, Carrie Ng	Action	TV-movie
Operation Pink Squad	Jeffrey Lau	Sandra Ng, Elsie Chan, Ann Bridgewater, Suki Kwan, Bowie Wu, Ng Man-tat, Yuen Cheung-yan	Action	
Painted Faces	Alex Law	Sammo Hung, Lam Ching Ying, Cheng Pei-pei	Action / Drama	
Paper Marriage	Alfred Cheung	Sammo Hung, Maggie Cheung, Alfred Cheung, Dick Wei, Joyce Godenzi, Billy Chow	Drama	
Police Story 2	Jackie Chan	Jackie Chan, Maggie Cheung	Action / Adventure / Comedy / Crime / Drama	
Profiles of Pleasure	Tony Au	Rosamund Kwan, Nina Li Chi, Carina Lau, Pauline Wong, Adam Cheng, Paul Chun	Drama	
The Romancing Star II	Wong Jing	Andy Lau, Natalis Chan, Eric Tsang, Stanley Fung, Elizabeth Lee, Carina Lau, Chow Yun-fat	Romantic comedy	
Rouge	Stanley Kwan	Leslie Cheung, Anita Mui	Romantic fantasy	
School on Fire	Ringo Lam	Fennie Yuen, Sarah Lee, Roy Cheung, Damian Lau, Lam Ching-ying	Action	
Spooky, Spooky	Sammo Hung	Alfred Cheung, Anthony Chan, Wu Ma, Joyce Godenzi	Comedy	
Starry Is the Night	Ann Hui	George Lam, Brigitte Lin, Derek Yee	Drama	
Tiger Cage	Yuen Woo-ping	Simon Yam, Carol Cheng, Jacky Cheung, Irene Wan, Donnie Yen, Bryan Leung, Ng Man-tat	Action	
Tiger on Beat	Lau Kar-leung	Chow Yun-fat, Conan Lee, Nina Li Chi	Crime / Comedy	
The Truth	Taylor Wong	Andy Lau, Deanie Ip	Crime	
Walk on Fire	Norman Law	Andy Lau, Cherie Chung, Kent Cheng, Ray Lui, Dick Wei	Action	
