= Qian Nü You Hun =

Qian Nü You Hun (Chinese: 倩女幽魂; pinyin: Qiàn Nǚ Yōu Hún; Jyutping: Sin6 Neoi5 Jau1 Wan4) is the name of many adaptations of Pu Songling's short story Nie Xiaoqian. It may refer to:

== Films ==
- The Enchanting Shadow, a 1960 Hong Kong Shaw Brothers film starring Betty Loh Ti
- A Chinese Ghost Story, a 1987 Hong Kong film produced by Tsui Hark, starring Leslie Cheung, Joey Wong and Wu Ma
- A Chinese Ghost Story II, a 1990 sequel to A Chinese Ghost Story produced by Tsui Hark, starring Leslie Cheung, Joey Wong, Jacky Cheung, Michelle Reis and Wu Ma
- A Chinese Ghost Story III, a 1991 sequel to A Chinese Ghost Story II produced by Tsui Hark, starring Tony Leung Chiu-Wai, Jacky Cheung and Joey Wong
- A Chinese Ghost Story: The Tsui Hark Animation, a 1997 animated film produced by Tsui Hark
- A Chinese Ghost Story (2011 film), alternatively known as A Chinese Fairy Tale, a 2011 Chinese-Hong Kong film directed by Wilson Yip, starring Liu Yifei, Louis Koo and Yu Shaoqun

== Television ==
- Eternity: A Chinese Ghost Story, a 2003 television series starring Daniel Chan and Barbie Hsu
