= Lau Siu-ming =

Hong Kong actor (1931–2026)

- 劉兆銘
- Born: Lau Siu-ming; 13 October 1931; British Hong Kong
- Died: 2 September 2026 (aged 94)
- Other name: Ming sir
- Occupations: Dancer; actor
- Years active: 1979–2026
- Spouse: Cheung Wai Ling

Chinese name
- Traditional Chinese: 劉兆銘
- Simplified Chinese: 刘兆铭
Transcriptions
Standard Mandarin
- Hanyu Pinyin: Liú Zhàomíng

Lau Siu-ming (traditional Chinese: 劉兆銘; simplified Chinese: 刘兆铭, 13 October 1931 – 2 September 2026) was a Hong Kong dancer and actor. He started his acting career in TVB. He starred in the movie "The Butterfly Murders" for the first time in 1979. Though he is best known for his roles in The Legend of the Condor Heroes, the 1990 martial arts film Swordsman, A Chinese Ghost Story, A Chinese Ghost Story II, and A Chinese Ghost Story III. In 2006, he was nominated for the Best Supporting Actor Award at the 11th Hong Kong Golden Bauhinia Awards for playing Uncle Ghost in the film Re-cycle.

== Early life ==
Lau Siu-ming was born on 13 October 1931, and his ancestral home was Longkou Town, Heshan City, Jiangmen, Guangdong. When he was young, he traveled across the ocean alone and worked as a warehouse worker on a cruise ship. Later, he was awarded a scholarship to dance at the Classical Ballet Research Center in Cannes, France.

== Career ==
Lau had profound attainments in dance. He was one of the pioneers of the Hong Kong dance industry and the first Hong Kong dancer to emerge internationally. Later, he opened a dance school to train young actors, so he was called "Ming sir".

His first acting role was in the film The Butterfly Murders in 1979.

In 1987, he starred in the costume film A Chinese Ghost Story directed by Tsui Hark and Cheng Xiaodong, starring Leslie Cheung and Wang Zuxian. In the film, he successfully portrayed the yin and yang of the dryad grandma; It achieved good box office results and made costume ghost films become the trend of Hong Kong films again.

In 1994, he starred in the love drama Goodbye, My Wife directed by Li Guoli, and played Dong Liguang in the series; in the same year, he starred in the action film Drunken Master II directed by Lau Kar-leung (Pinyin: Liu Jialiang) starring Jackie Chan and Anita Mui, and played Chiu in the series; with a box office of 40.97 million Hong Kong dollars, the film won the annual runner-up of the Hong Kong box office, and was selected as "one of the top ten films in the world in 1994" by the American magazine Time.

In 2001, Lau Siu-ming accepted the invitation to perform Hong Kong Ballet's "White Snake" and Hong Kong Dance Company's "Blessings of Love". With his years of performing arts experience, he led the two stage plays and was awarded the 2002 Hong Kong Dance Award.

On 27 June 2007, at the age of 76, Lau was awarded the title of Honorary Fellow by the Hong Kong Academy for Performing Arts in recognition of his achievements.

In 2009, he starred in the commercial war drama Fuguimen directed by Zhuang Weijian, starring Lu Liangwei and Yuan Anita, and played Dong Tianzhu in the series. In 2010, together with Chung King Fai and Lu Weiluan (Xiao Si), he won the Outstanding Artistic Contribution Award of the "2009 Hong Kong Arts Development Award".

On 16 December 2013, Lau won the 46th TVB Thousands of Stars Performing Artist Award.

== Personal life and death ==
Lau Siu-ming's wife of 50 years, Cheung Wai Ling, died of cancer. On 31 October 2012, a funeral ceremony was held at the Holy Cross Church in Sai Wan Ho. Friends in the circle, Liu Songyan, Huang Qiusheng, Guo Aiming and Chen Jinhong, etc. attended the ceremony.

Lau died on 2 September 2026, at the age of 94.

== Filmography ==
=== Television series ===
Year	Title	Chinese title	Role	Ref.
1981	The Shell Game II	千王羣英會	Chou Da Qian	
1981	The Young Heroes of Shaolin	英雄出少年	Lei Ba San	
1982	Hero Without Tears	青鋒劍影	Supporting Role	
1982	The Wild Bunch	十三太保	Zhu Wen	
1982	The Legend of Master So	蘇乞兒	Supporting Role	
1982	Soldier of Fortune	香城浪子	Poon Kai Hang	
1982	The Emissary	獵鷹	Luk Yat Fan	
1982	Demi-Gods and Semi-Devils	天龍八部	Duen Yut-Hing	
1983	Woman on the Beat	警花出更	Ming Ming's father	
1983	The Legend of the Condor Heroes	射鵰英雄傳	Duan Zhixing/Yat Deng	
1984	Police Cadet '84	新紮師兄 I	[Cheung Wai Kit's father]	
1984	The Old Miao Myth	老洞	Tse Kong	
1984	The Return of the Condor Heroes	神鵰俠侶	Monk Yuk Deng	
1984	The Duke of Mount Deer	鹿鼎記	Eunuch Hoi Dai Fu	
1984	Once Upon an Ordinary Girl	儂本多情	Chun Gaan [Siu Maan's father]	
1984	The Smiling, Proud Wanderer	笑傲江湖	Yam Ngo Hun	
1985	Happy Spirit	開心女鬼	Ha Siu Tin	
1985	The Yang's Saga	楊家將	Support Role	
1985	The Battle Among the Clans	大香港	Support Role	
1985	The Rough Ride	挑戰	Tse Kai Cheung [Bik Wah's father]	
1985	The General That Never Was	薛仁貴征東	Emperor Taizong of Tang	
1985	Police Cadet '85	新紮師兄 II	[Cheung Wai Kit's father]	
1986	The New Heaven Sword and the Dragon Sabre	倚天屠龍記	Yeung Ding Tin	
1986	General Father, General Son	薛丁山征西	Lee Sai Man/Tong Tai Chung	
1987	Police Cadet 1988	新紮師兄 III	[Cheung Wai Kit's father]	
1987	The Grand Canal	大運河	Lei Yien	
1991	The Breaking Point	今生無悔	全哥	
1993	The Legendary Ranger	原振俠	Wong Kong	
1994	Filthy Rich	豪門插班生	Mo Tin Dok	
1994	Shades of Darkness	異度凶情	Support Role	
1994	Fate of the Clairvoyant	再見亦是老婆	Gong Bak	
1995	The Criminal Investigator	O記實錄	Support Role	
1996	The Criminal Investigator II	O記實錄II	Gwai [Chi Chung's father]	
2000	At the Threshold of an Era II	創世紀II之天地有情	Chun Kam [Nick's father]	
2003	The Driving Power	非常外父	Ding Ha	
2003	Seed of Hope	俗世情真	Support Role	
2009	Born Rich	富貴門	Tung Teen Chuk	
2011	Wax and Wane	團圓	Support Role	
2017	Bet Hur	賭城群英會	Support Role	
2018	Shadow of Justice	蝕日風暴	Support Role	
2020	The Gutter	歎息橋	[Thomas' father]	

=== Films ===
Year	Title	Chinese title	Role	Ref.
2015	Lost in Wrestling	搏击迷城	Support Role	
2007	The Detective	C+偵探	Uncle Cheung	
2005	Set to Kill	借兵	Uncle Ghost	
2003	The Medallion	飛龍再生	[Antiquerium Dealer]	
2000	China Strike Force	雷霆戰警	Uncle Ma	
1997	Kitchen	我愛廚房	Mr. Chiu	
1994	Mermaid Got Married	第六感奇緣之人魚傳說	Uncle Lau	
1993	The Untold Story	八仙飯店之人肉叉燒包	Cheng Lam	
1992	The Prince of Temple Street	廟街十二少	Hao	
1992	Casino Tycoon II	賭城大亨II之至尊無敵	Nieh Ao Tien	
1992	Casino Tycoon	賭城大亨之新哥傳奇	Nieh Ao Tien	
1991	A Chinese Ghost Story III	倩女幽魂3之道道道	[Uncle Fan's Carer]	
1991	Phantom War	英倫越戰	Lau Min	
1991	An Eternal Combat	天地玄門	Support Role	
1990	Front Page	新半斤八兩	Brother Shun	
1990	A Chinese Ghost Story II	倩女幽魂2之人間道	Lord Fu	
1990	Killer's Romance	浪漫殺手自由人	Uncle Pa	
1990	The Swordsman	笑傲江湖	Ngok Bak Kwan	
1989	The Truth: Final Episode	法內情大結局	Mr. Ming	
1989	Devil Hunters	獵魔群英	Chai Yan	
1989	The Black Wall	黑色迷牆	[Bon's boss]	
1988	The Crazy Companies 2	最佳損友闖情關	Fok Ka Tung	
1988	Last Romance	流金歲月	[Nancy's Father]	
1988	The Vampire Partner	鬼咁串	Support Role	
1988	Police Story 2	警察故事續集	[Senior police official]	
1988	Walk on Fire	獵鷹計劃	Officer Chan	
1988	The Truth	法內情	[Raymond's helper]	
1987	A Better Tomorrow 2	英雄本色II	Inspector Wu	
1987	A Chinese Ghost Story	倩女幽魂	[Tree Devil]	
1985	The Unwritten Law	法外情	Support Role	
