= 100 Ways to Murder Your Wife =

1986 Hong Kong film by Kenny Bee

- Film poster
- Traditional Chinese: 殺妻二人組
- Simplified Chinese: 杀妻二人组
- Hanyu Pinyin: Shā Qī Èr Rén Zǔ
- Jyutping: Saat3 Cai1 Ji6 Jan4 Zou2
- Directed by: Kenny Bee
- Screenplay by: Alex Law
- Produced by: Wong Jing
- Starring: Kenny Bee; Anita Mui; Chow Yun-fat; Joey Wong
- Cinematography: Jimmy Leung
- Edited by: Ma Chung-yin; Chiu Cheuk-man; Siu Fung
- Music by: Kenny Bee; Alan Tsui; So Chan-hung
- Production companies: Golden Harvest; Go Go Film Production
- Distributed by: Golden Harvest
- Release date: 5 June 1986
- Running time: 92 minutes
- Country: Hong Kong
- Language: Cantonese
- Box office: HK$14,106,643

100 Ways to Murder Your Wife (in Chinese 殺妻二人組) is a 1986 Hong Kong comedy film directed by Kenny Bee and starring Bee, Anita Mui, Chow Yun-fat and Joey Wong.

== Plot ==
Two well-respected football players meet one night in a Hong Kong bar. Roberto is a highly rated striker for a popular team while Football Fa is a star goalkeeper. Over a few drinks, the pair share compliments and, as the evening draws on, their problems. As things turn out, both of these cowardly men have the same major problem: their wives. Roberto's wife Anita constantly nags him and designs outrageous outfits that she insists he wears. Meanwhile, Football Fa is insanely jealous about his beautiful wife Wong Siu-yin and her popularity with his team-mates. Falling into a drunken stupor, both men foolishly agree to get rid of each other's wives. Football Fa seems to have succeeded when he goes to Roberto's house and wakes up thinking he has done the deed. In fact, Roberto's wife has left thinking that her husband is with another woman. These two misunderstandings remain hidden though and Football Fa, recovering from the distressing thought of being a murderer, insists that Roberto returns the favour. What follows is an elaborate series of ideas to achieve this dubious goal and get away with it free from blame.

== Cast ==
- Kenny Bee as Roberto
- Anita Mui as Anita
- Chow Yun-fat as Football Fa
- Joey Wong as Wong Siu-yin
- Wong Jing as Mr. Wong
- Eric Yeung as George
- Bennett Pang as Bomb seller
- Anthony Chan as Bridegroom Chan Chi-to (cameo)
- Siu Woon-ching as Bride Tsui Ching-ching
- Danny Yip as Reverend at wedding ceremony
- Lai Mei-po
- Wu Ma as Bathroom attendant (cameo)
- Angela Chan as Anita's neighbour
- Angela Leung as Anita's neighbour
- Sandy Lamb as Anita's neighbour
- Shing Fui-On as Fa's football teammate
- Alex Ng as Fa's football teammate
- Lee Yiu-king as Fa's football teammate
- Shing Fuk-on as Fa's football teammate
- Leung Mei-kei
- Alan Tsui
- Lee Man-piu as Fa's birthday party guest
- Raymond Lee as BBQ Pork seller
- Sze Kai-keung as Love Gay at gay club
- Alan Tam (cameo)
- Ho Kam-kong as Match commentator
- Yat-poon Chai as traffic cop (cameo)
- Cho Yuen-tat as Journey of Love at gay bar
- Poon Man-kit as BBQ Pork seller
- Cheung Yuen-wah as Reporter
- Annabelle Lui as Reporter
- Kobe Wong as Parking valet
- Wan Chi Keung as Party guest

== Box office ==
The film grossed HK$14,106,643 at the Hong Kong box office during its theatrical run from 5 to 19 June 1986 in Hong Kong.

== See also ==
- Anita Mui filmography
- Chow Yun-fat filmography
- Wong Jing filmography
