= Working Class (film) =

1985 Hong Kong film by Tsui Hark

- Theatrical release poster
- Chinese: 打工皇帝
- Literal meaning: Emperor of Migrant Workers
Transcriptions
Standard Mandarin
- Hanyu Pinyin: Dǎgōng huángdì
Yue: Cantonese
- Jyutping: Daa^{2}gung^{1} wong^{4}dai^{3}
- Directed by: Tsui Hark
- Screenplay by: Chan Kan-kuen
- Produced by: Tsui Hark
- Starring: Sam Hui; Teddy Robin; Tsui Hark; Joey Wang
- Cinematography: Henry Chan
- Edited by: David Wu
- Music by: Teddy Robin
- Production companies: Film Workshop; Cinema City & Films Co.
- Distributed by: Golden Princess Amusement Company
- Release date: 10 August 1985 (HK)
- Running time: 98 minutes
- Country: Hong Kong
- Language: Cantonese
- Box office: HK$16,931,337

Working Class (Chinese: 打工皇帝; lit. 'Emperor of Migrant Workers') is a 1985 Hong Kong comedy film directed and produced by Tsui Hark, and starring Sam Hui, Teddy Robin, Joey Wong, and Hark himself. It was released by Golden Princess Amusement on 10 August 1985.

== Plot ==
Yam is convinced that marrying a rich woman leads to problems, so rich girl May pretends not to be rich in order to be close to him. She eventually confesses that she is the daughter of the head of the ramen factory where he works. She ends up working in the same factory in order to learn about the business and embarrasses Yam with her beneficial treatment of him in front of the other workers.

Members of the factory management attempt to set the factory on fire as part of a fraud scheme but are discovered by May, so they lock her inside the factory as they set it on fire. May calls Yam's house and reaches Yam's mother, who finds Yam and the other factory workers playing football against a rival team. They rush to the burning factory and rescue May, then fix the damaged machinery and borrow flour from friends in order to satisfy the existing orders. May's father is pleased and gives half of the company shares to the employees in thanks for saving the factory.

== Cast ==
- Sam Hui as Yam
- Teddy Robin as Hing
- Tsui Hark as Sunny
- Joey Wang as May
- Ng Man-tat as Yue
- Shum Wai as Wu
- Li Yen-ping as Diva Ping
- Kwan Hoi-san as Uncle Ha
- Anglie Leung as Jane
- O Sing-pui as Bo
- Ken Lo as Kickboxer
- Hui Shiu-hung as Kickboxer's Trainer
- Bolo Yeung as Giant Kickboxer
- Wong Kam-bo as Yam's Boss
- Yat Boon-chai as May's Chauffeur
- Yeung Yau-cheung as Interpol Inspector
- Ken Boyle as Police Officer
- Ng Hon-keung as Mad Rooster
- Paul Lai as Health Inspector Lai
- Luk Ying-hong as Motorcycle Policeman
- Nan Hong as Maria
- Pau Hon-lam as May's Father
- David Wu as Supervisor
- Yiu Yau-hung as Boney M

== Production ==
The film was shot in Hong Kong.

== Release ==
The film had a theatrical run in Hong Kong from 10 to 25 August 1985, earning HK$16,931,337, followed by a theatrical release in Taiwan on 19 October 1985.

== Reception ==
=== Critical response ===
Reviewer Andrew Saroch of fareastfilms.com gave the film a rating of 3 out of 5 stars, writing, "Although it doesn't rank as top notch Hui or Hark, there is still much to keep the viewer absorbed here. There's some very well handled comic scenarios that manage to move from cliché to humour; foremost among these is the romance between Samuel Hui and Joey Wong which is oft-seen, but given a fresh treatment here. Those expecting the typical Tsui Hark flair and innovation may be disappointed by this straight-forward comedy, but it still shows his ability to add something to even the most well-trod narratives."

Reviewer Kozo of lovehkfilm.com called the film "a surprisingly effective comedy", writing, "There is a bouncy fifties feel to Tsui’s modern comedy. The factory is a communal place of camaraderie and bright, day-glo dreams. However, there is an abnormal amount of political hubbub mixed in with the four-color fun. [...] Tsui Hark’s direction is as scattershot and screwball as ever, but it works in giving us this minor eighties gem. By eighties HK standards, that is."

A review on RoweReviews reads, "Extremely political but not in a way that is didactic or forceful, Working Class instead utilizes farce to elucidate the absurdities of this system and its false promises towards labor; serfdom hasn't been abolished by merely repositioned - sworn loyalty to a lord is merely replaced by the same expectations from the managerial class in a rapidly booming Hong Kong. The anarchical nature of our main protagonists, their actions represent an implicit refusal to conform to the social order presented in front of them, is not a rejection of labor or hard work but a rejection of the inequalities and subjugation which the newly formed managerial class wields."

A review by Sean Gilman on The Chinese Cinema reads, "Working Class I think gets closer to the heart of what makes Tsui a great filmmaker: the mixing of New Wave politics with popular genre filmmaking. It's not the commodification or assimilation of leftist ideals into a corporate mainstream, but the repackaging of them as a shiny, goofy treat, a cookie full of arsenic for the exploitative middle managers of the world."

In an essay on medium.com, author @jamestkirk83 wrote, "Tsui is an intensely political director, and even his silliest movies can have a double consciousness, delivering absurd jokes and crazy action while they obliquely gesture to a political argument. You can see it in something like his early slapstick comedy Working Class, a feel-good flick about workers changing the conditions in their noodle factory; if the film is frothy and romantic, it's because Tsui wants to deliver its proletariat fantasy in the most palatable and digestible format possible."

The review of the film on sogoodreviews.com reads, "Tsui Hark depicts the struggles between the workers and the employers rather simplistically (work together is the complex moral of the story here) but at a time where Tsui was on a creative roll, Working Class expectedly succeeds as a pleasant product of the era that simply wouldn't have worked as well today. The social commentary on display never goes mature places as such and relies more on wacky comedy but truth of the matter is that most of what we see is very amusing."

Reviewer Simon of the14amazons.co.uk wrote, "All pretty goofy stuff, but a very well crafted film. Characters are rounded, script is good and direction is top notch. Most enjoyable. Besides the comedy, he also works a little bit of politics into the film, the basic working class on the shop floor vs. corrupt management being a non-too subtle statement, but he doesn't try to rub your face in it."

=== Award nominations ===
Samuel Hui was nominated for the Hong Kong Film Award for Best Original Film Song at the 5th Hong Kong Film Awards for the song "The Most Important Thing Is to Have Fun" but did not win.
