= The Diary of a Big Man =

1988 Hong Kong film by Chor Yuen

- Film poster
- Traditional Chinese: 大丈夫日記
- Simplified Chinese: 大丈夫日记
- Hanyu Pinyin: Dà Zhàng Fū Rì Jì
- Jyutping: Daai6 Zeong6 Fu1 Jat6 Gei3
- Directed by: Chor Yuen
- Screenplay by: Philip Cheng; Ng Man-fai
- Produced by: Tsui Hark
- Starring: Chow Yun-fat; Sally Yeh; Joey Wong; Waise Lee
- Cinematography: Lee San-ip; Lam Wa-chiu
- Edited by: David Wu
- Music by: James Wong; David Wu; Romeo Diaz
- Production companies: Cinema City Company; Film Workshop
- Distributed by: Cinema City Company
- Release date: 21 July 1988
- Running time: 89 minutes
- Country: Hong Kong
- Language: Cantonese
- Box office: HK$19,419,539.00

The Diary of a Big Man is a 1988 Hong Kong romantic comedy film directed by veteran producer and actor Chor Yuen, produced by Tsui Hark and starring Chow Yun-fat in the lead role. The film co-stars Sally Yeh, Joey Wong, Waise Lee, Carrie Ng, and Kent Cheng.

== Plot ==
Chow Ting-fat (Chow Yun-fat) dreams of getting rich and marrying a beautiful woman. One night, when his car breaks down in heavy rainfall, he meets two women, Joey (Joey Wong), a boutique owner, and Sally (Sally Yeh), a stewardess. He ends up marrying both women, Joey in America and Sally in Paris.

Chow enlists his best friend and business partner, Chi-hung (Waise Lee), who is aware of Chow's bigamy, to assist him during emergency times including run-ins, close calls, and scheduling conflicts when spending time with both women. Unfortunately, a run-in with police inspector Cheng (Kent Cheng) sends Chow to the hospital, and both wives rush to his side, arousing the suspicions of Inspector Cheng.

When Sally buys a dress at Joey's boutique the two become friends. Sally accompanies Chow to Joey's apartment for her birthday, with Chi-hung posing as Joey's husband. Chi-hung tells Joey that Inspector Cheng, also at the gathering, is a psychopath. But Chi-hung later suffers a breakdown, leading his girlfriend Ka-lai (Carrie Ng) to suspect that something is amiss. During Chow's and his wives' first year wedding anniversary, When Sally and Joey both go to the same photo shop to have their wedding pictures reframed for their first anniversaries, they discover they are both married to the same man.

Angry and desperate, Sally, Joey, and Ka-lai plan a vacation for Chow and Chi-hung at a hotel. There, Chi-hung is confronted by Ka-lai for his role in keeping Chow's bigamy a secret, and Chow, still oblivious to his secret being exposed, is punished by his wives with slaps and being beaten by paid thugs. Finally, Sally and Joey reveal to Chow his secret is out and leaves him tied to his hotel bed and turns on the fire sprinkler system.

After Chow's failed attempt to woo them back, Sally and Joey run into each other at the airport, each thinking about leaving Hong Kong. They discuss who should stay married to and be with Chow. But, after a run-in with Chow there and seeing his desperate attempts to win them back, Sally and Joey both decide to stay. All three inadvertently run into each other at the Casablanca restaurant, where outside they stumbled upon Inspector Cheng and his police force engage in a gun fight with two drug criminals. Chow is grazed by a bullet in the process, prompting his wives to beat up the two crooks, giving the police a leeway to arrest them. After the mayhem, Chow apologizes to Sally and Joey for his bigamy and acknowledges their marriage arrangement will not work. They all then part ways.

Later on, though, Chow is seen in Middle Eastern attire and spending time happily with Sally and Joey, also in Middle Eastern attires, leading to the belief they all either converted to a Middle Eastern religion or moved to a Middle Eastern country where polygamy is legal.

== Cast ==
- Chow Yun-fat as Chow Ting-fat - A businessman at a stock market company, and a bigamist who must prevent secret from being exposed to his wives.
- Sally Yeh as Sally - A stewardess, one of two women married to Chow.
- Joey Wong as Joey - A boutique owner, one of two women married to Chow.
- Waise Lee as Chi-hung - Chow's best friend and business partner, dedicated to help keep Chow's bigamy a secret.
- Carrie Ng as Ka-lai - Chi Hung's over-suspicious girlfriend.
- Kent Cheng as Inspector Cheng - Police detective who became suspicious over Chow's situation.
- Shing Fui-On as Drug criminal.
- David Wu as David, police officer.
- James Wong as Beauty salon employee.
