= List of Born Rich characters =

This is a list of characters in the Hong Kong television series Born Rich. The series ran for one season with 41 episodes.

== Cast ==
=== Cheuk Family ===
Cast	Role	Description
Lau Kong	Cheuk Song-hei 卓崇禧	Marcus, Yat-ming, and Rene's father.
Nancy Sit	Musa "Mu Jie" Sheung Hoi-mei 常開眉	Cheuk Shun-hei's wife and the biological mother of Marcus.
Ray Lui	Marcus Cheuk Yat-yuen 卓一元	Cheuk Shun-hei's eldest son CEO of Cosmo Bank
Jamie Chik	Connie Ho Tseuk-nin 賀爵年	Marcus's wife
Gallen Lo	Sha Fu-loi / Cheuk Yatming 沙富來 / 卓一鳴	A con artist, Fu-loi takes over the identity of Cheuk Yat-ming, Cheuk Shun-hei's second son. Deputy chief executive officer of Cosmo Bank; Yik-yan ex-boyfriend
Anita Yuen	Rene Cheuk Yat-sam 卓一心	Youngest daughter of Cheuk Shun-hei. Corporate communications director of Cosmo Bank
Joe Ma Tak-Chung	"Topman" Ko Tok-man 高拓民	Rene's husband. Chief operating officer of Cosmo Bank

=== Sha Family ===
Cast	Role	Description
Gallen Lo	Sha Fu-loi / Cheuk Yatming 沙富來 / 卓一鳴	A con artist, Fu-loi takes over the identity of Cheuk Yat-ming, Cheuk Shun-hei's second son. Deputy chief executive officer of Cosmo Bank
Kenneth Ma	Sha Po-loi 沙寶來	Fu-loi's younger brother. General department of general services of Cosmo Bank; Yik-yan Boyfriend

=== Tung Family ===
Cast	Role	Description
Kenix Kwok	Angie Tung Ling-chi 董令姿	Tung Tin-chuk's daughter Marcus's ex-girlfriend Lawyer
Lau Siu-ming (劉兆銘)	Tung Tin-juk 董天祝	Angie's father Stockholders of Cosmo Bank

=== Tai Family ===
Cast	Role	Description
Sharon Chan	Yan Tai Yik-yan 戴亦欣	Age 28; Tai Wing-luk and Eva's daughter Po-loi's girlfriend Sha Fu-loi ex Boyfriend; Personal finance director of Cosmo Bank
Benz Hui	Tai Wing-luk 戴永祿	Age 60; Yan's father General Manager of Cosmo Bank
Angelina Lo (盧宛茵)	Eva Pao Siu-nga 鮑笑雁)	Age 56; Yan's mother

=== Cosmo Bank Corporation ===
Cast	Role	Description
Ray Lui	Cheuk Yat-yuen 卓一元 (Marcus)	Cheuk Shun-hei's eldest son CEO of Cosmo Bank
Lau Siu Ming (劉兆銘)	Tung Tin-chuk 董天祝	Angie's father Board of Directors Member of Cosmo Bank
Lily Leung (梁舜燕)	Ma Cheung Wai-Kiu 馬蔣卉翹	Board of Directors Member of Cosmo Bank
Yu Tze Ming (余子明)	Man Ngo-Gwan 文傲君	Board of Directors Member of Cosmo Bank
Kwong Chor Fai (鄺佐輝)	Lai Kei Pui 賴紀培	Board of Directors Member of Cosmo Bank
Kong Hon (江漢)	Lei Wai Seun 李唯信	Board of Directors Member of Cosmo Bank
So Yun Chi (蘇恩磁)		Board of Directors Member of Cosmo Bank
Lee Sing Cheung (李成昌)	Lai Wun Choi 黎允才 (Herman)	Chief financial officer of Cosmo Bank
Gallen Lo	Sha Fu-loi / Cheuk Yatming 沙富來 / 卓一鳴	A con artist, Fu-loi takes over the identity of Cheuk Yat-ming, Cheuk Shun-hei's second son. Deputy chief executive officer of Cosmo Bank; Yik-yan ex-boyfriend
Joe Ma Tak-Chung	Ko Tok-man 高拓民 (Topman)	Rene's husband. COO of Cosmo Bank
Anita Yuen	Cheuk Yat-sam 卓一心 (Rene)	Youngest daughter of Cheuk Shun-hei. Corporate communications director of Cosmo Bank
Sharon Chan	Tai Yik-yan 戴亦欣 (Yan)	Tai Wing-luk and Eva's daughter Po-loi's girlfriend Sha Fu-loi ex-boyfriend Personal finance director of Cosmo Bank
Benz Hui	Tai Wing-luk 戴永祿	Yan's father General manager of Cosmo Bank
Candy Chu		Manager of Cosmo Bank
Kenneth Ma	Sha Po-loi 沙寶來	Age 28; Fu-loi's younger brother. General department of general services of Cosmo Bank; Yik-yan Boyfriend
Vincent Wong (王浩信)	Szto Fung 司徒豐 (Tiger)	Age 28; Yik yan's ex-boyfriend Private banking manager of Cosmo Bank
Grace Wong (王君馨)	Yu Yee-lam 余依琳	Topman's lover Fund manager of Cosmo Bank
Eileen Yeow	Leung Wan-Yee 梁韻怡 (Wendy)	Connie's cousin
Snow Suen (孫慧雪)	Katy	Cheuk Yatming's secretary
Lam Shuk Man (林淑敏)	Fiona	Marcus's secretary

=== Other cast ===
Cast	Role	Description
Savio Tsang (曾偉權)	Ma Dik-Kun 馬狄勤 (Matthew)	Angie's former boyfriend
Bowie Wu (胡楓)	Yeung Yeen-Fun 楊廷勛 (Donald)	Lawyer
Paul Chun	Yip Sin-Sang 葉先生	Cheuk Yat-yuen's grandfather Guest Appearance
Ko Jun Man (高俊文)	Ching Pak-Him 程柏謙 (Carson)	
Patrick Dunn	Kai Fat 啟發	Merchant Banker
Deno Cheung (張松枝)	Kei Pak Bun 紀柏彬	
Hoffman Cheng (鄭世豪)		Passerby
Gill Mohindepaul Singh	Robin	Hotel Bellboy; Guest Appearance (Ep. 16 & 17)
Ricky Wong (王俊棠)		Kidnapped Sha brothers and Rene; Guest Appearance (Ep. 2 & 3)
Peter Pang (彭冠中)		Kidnapped Marcus; Guest Appearance (Ep. 17 & 18)
