= A Chinese Ghost Story =

1987 Hong Kong film by Ching Siu-tung

- Hong Kong film poster
- Chinese: 倩女幽魂
- Literal meaning: Beautiful ghost woman
Transcriptions
Standard Mandarin
- Hanyu Pinyin: Qiàn yǚ yōuhún
Yue: Cantonese
- Jyutping: Sin^{6} neoi^{5} jau^{1}wan^{4}
- Directed by: Ching Siu-tung
- Written by: Yuen Kai-chi
- Based on: "Nie Xiaoqian" by Pu Songling
- Produced by: Tsui Hark
- Starring: Leslie Cheung; Joey Wong; Wu Ma
- Cinematography: Poon Hang-sang; Sander Lee; Tom Lau; Wong Wing-hang
- Edited by: David Wu
- Music by: Romeo Diaz; James Wong Jim
- Production company: Film Workshop; Cinema City
- Distributed by: Golden Princess Amusement
- Release date: 18 July 1987 (HK)
- Running time: 98 minutes
- Country: Hong Kong
- Language: Cantonese
- Box office: US$3.8 million (est.)

A Chinese Ghost Story (Chinese: 倩女幽魂; lit. 'Beautiful ghost woman') is a 1987 Hong Kong romantic xianxia horror film directed by Ching Siu-tung and produced by Tsui Hark. It stars Leslie Cheung, Joey Wong and Wu Ma in the leading roles. The plot is loosely based on the short story "Nie Xiaoqian" from Strange Stories from a Chinese Studio by Pu Songling, and is also inspired by the 1960 Shaw Brothers film The Enchanting Shadow.

The film was popular in Hong Kong and East Asia. Although the film could not gain access to theatres in mainland China when it was first released, it became a cult film among younger mainland Chinese. At that time, the film generated a phenomenal cult following among audiences, especially the generation born in the 1980s. In 2011, the Hong Kong producers screened a restored version officially in mainland China.

The film boosted the stardom of Joey Wong, increased Leslie Cheung's popularity in Japan, and sparked a trend of folklore ghost films in the Hong Kong film industry. In 2005, film was ranked number 50 of the Best 100 Chinese Motion Pictures. It was followed by two direct sequels, an animated reimagining, and two remakes.

== Plot ==
Ning Caichen, a timid debt collector, goes to a rural town and ends up taking shelter in a deserted temple in the forest. That night, he meets Nie Xiaoqian and falls in love with her. In the morning, he becomes fearful and superstitious after hearing from Yan Chixia, a Taoist priest, that he had encountered ghosts in the temple. Later that night, he returns to the temple and confirms that Nie is a ghost.

Nie tells Ning about how she has been enslaved by a Tree Demoness because her remains are buried at the foot of the tree. Ning wants to free her soul, so he seeks help from Yan, who fights the Tree Demoness but loses. As a punishment for betraying her master, Nie's soul is banished to the Underworld.

Unwilling to give up, Ning convinces Yan to help him open a temporary portal into the Underworld to search for Nie, eventually reuniting with her briefly near dawn. Ning learns that the only way to save Nie's soul is to rebury her remains at a more auspicious burial site, which he does so near a hill crest. He burns a joss stick for her and prays while Yan watches solemnly behind him.

== Cast ==
- Leslie Cheung as Ning Caichen
- Joey Wong as Nie Xiaoqian
- Wu Ma as Yan Chixia
- Lau Siu-ming as the Tree Demoness
- Lam Wai as Xiahou
- Xue Zhilun as Xiaoqing
- Wong Jing as the magistrate
- David Wu as the magistrate's secretary

== Production ==
=== Development and writing ===
Tsui Hark was interested in creating A Chinese Ghost Story as early as 1978, when he proposed making a television series to the Hong Kong television station TVB. The producers turned it down, feeling it would not be suitable for television. A Chinese Ghost Story uses elements of several stories from Pu Songling's 17th-century collection Strange Tales from a Chinese Studio. Tsui stated that they changed a lot of the stories for their adaptation as they found out the stories were against their initial interpretation.

On developing the film, Tsui noted that Ching Siu-tung wanted to work with him. Ching had previously worked as a director and an action choreographer on various Film Workshop productions such as Peking Opera Blues and A Better Tomorrow II. Tsui suggested developing A Chinese Ghost Story, describing it as a love story which Ching was not as interested in developing as either a romance film or a non-horror ghost story. Tsui noted that his bosses approached him to develop the film into being about a female cop, not being aware that it was based on a book or that it was a period film. While working on the film, Tsui and Ching did not really know what it would end up being like, as Ching was still apprehensive on creating a romance film and desired to add horror film elements.

Rumours persist around the production suggesting that Tsui effectively ghost directed the film. British critic Tony Rayns stated that, effectively, most Film Workshop productions were "redirected or hijacked by Tsui Hark."

=== Casting ===
Tsui had envisioned Nie Xiaoqian as a crossover between an angel and a demon, and wanted Japanese singer-actress Akina Nakamori to star in the film. Nakamori turned down the offer due to the language barrier and her inability to understand the story. May Lo was Tsui's second choice, but her growing popularity at that time meant she could not fit the filming into her schedule. Joey Wong then approached Tsui's wife, film producer Nansun Shi, for an audition and managed to score an audition with Tsui. During the audition, Wong was seen as a perfect fit for Tsui's vision and was cast as Nie Xiaoqian, being a professional basketball player and model before starting her film career. Prior to working on the film, she appeared in films such as the Taiwanese production It'll Be Very Cold at the Lakeside This Year. She would show up in a few Shaw Brothers Studio films and Tsui's film Working Class.

Actors in the film include Leslie Cheung, who was also a Cantopop singer. Cheung had previously worked with Tsui in A Better Tomorrow and A Better Tomorrow II. Cheung also sung the films theme song. Wu Ma had previously appeared in several Hong Kong horror films such as Spooky Encounters, The Dead and the Deadly and Mr. Vampire.

=== Filming and special effects ===
The film used the services of Cinefex Workshop, Hong Kong's first proper special effects studio, which had previously worked on Tsui's film Zu Warriors from the Magic Mountain. The script called for a giant slithering tongue and zombies, which were developed by Cinefex technician Man Xian Liang, who taught himself stop motion animation in order to make the effects happen.

=== Music ===
James Wong Jim contributed to the score of the film. Wong was primarily known for writing songs for pop stars and television programs and completed his first score for Tsui's Shanghai Blues.

== Release ==
A Chinese Ghost Story opened on July 18, 1987. The film received theatrical release throughout Asia and Europe. The film also received international recognition when it won the special Jury Prize at the Avoriaz festival in France and the Best Film Award at the Opporto Festival in Portugal in 1987.

=== Box office ===
A Chinese Ghost Story performed well at the Hong Kong box office, earning HK$18,831,638 (US$2,414,932) and becoming 1987's fifteenth highest-grossing film in Hong Kong. In Taiwan, it was the 11th highest-grossing film of 1987, selling 187,654 tickets and earning NT$12,684,540 (US$443,515). In South Korea, the film sold 31,639 tickets in Seoul upon release in December 1987, equivalent to an estimated ₩110,736,500 (US$134,623).

In the United Kingdom, the film sold 1,045 tickets in 1996, equivalent to an estimated £3,867 (US$6,042). In China, the film grossed US$328,204 in 2008 and CN¥2.95 million (US$456,553) in 2011, for a total of US$784,860 grossed in China. This adds up to an estimated total of US$3,783,972 grossed worldwide (equivalent to an estimated US$11 million adjusted for inflation).

=== Re-releases and restorations ===
In memory of Leslie Cheung, director Ching Siu-tung and producer Ng See-yuen re-released the film in cinemas across mainland China on 30 April 2011. China Radio International reported that the film was remastered with color timing that took about half a year. In addition, premieres took place in both Beijing and Shanghai. Ching, Ng and Lau Siu-ming were present. However, Wu Ma and Joey Wong, who were invited, did not attend the premiere. Ching had difficulty tracking down Wong and had to contact her through her family in Taiwan. He received a telephone call at the last minute from Wong's father, stating that the actress was in poor health and not in good condition to attend the premiere. Wong's father also quoted his daughter saying that acting in the film was one of her best memories.

In 2025, Cinema City Enterprises produced a 4K restoration of A Chinese Ghost Story, releasing it theatrically in China on 21 March 2025 in standard and 4DX formats. The re-release earned 10 million RMB in its first week. Shout! Factory released digital and Blu-ray versions of the restoration in August and October 2025, respectively, having acquired worldwide rights to production company Golden Princess' catalogue in January.

== Reception and legacy ==
From contemporary reviews, Walter Goodman (The New York Times) noted poor subtitling on the print he viewed, opining that "If there are any Eastern profundities emanating from the temple, this Westerner did not recognize them." and that "The kick you get from all this will depend on how exciting you find explosive exhibitions of extraterrestrial exercises." Kim Newman (Monthly Film Bulletin) described the film as "an excellent example of the distinctive type of ghost/horror film that has been coming out of Hong Kong for many years" and that the film "affords an insight into a movie mythos at least as highly developed and ritualized as the Universal horror cycle of the 30s or the Hammer films of the 50s and 60s". The film was reviewed by a critic credited as "Mel" in Variety who praised the film, stating that "Cinema City is to be congratulated for searching original Chinese material. The art direction, costumes, cinematography and soundtrack music are all exceptional." The review went on to state that the "storyline portray the beauty and fragility of life on earth" which led to "an entertaining love story with a tantalizing horror background, mixed with fantasy escapism that won't insult adult viewers."

From retrospective reviews, The Guardian described the film as "one of the breakthrough films of modern Hong Kong cinema" and that it was "dubious knockabout comedy [...] spiced with frantic set piece stunts (mid-air fights, thousand-foot tongues); not for those who value comprehensibility over panache." Empire gave the film four stars out of five, noting "gorgeous imagery" and that it was not "quite as completely demented as Mr Vampire, but it is truly strange." Donald C Willis wrote in his book Horror and Science Fiction Film IV that A Chinese Ghost Story was "an entertaining fantasy extravaganza" and that "the movie is very inventive, occasionally even poetic, but not quite moving". John Charles gave the film an eight out of ten rating, noting that some horror elements in the film were in debt to the film The Evil Dead, but noted that the "cinematography and art direction are superb, the action is invigorating, and the love story surprisingly touching, making this one of the most captivating and enjoyable fantasies of the post-New Wave period."

In mainland China, before the film was officially released in 2011, it was already widely circulated through unofficial channels- including smuggled videocassettes, pirated VCDs and DVDs, and later, video-sharing websites- and celebrated as a cult classic. The Chinese generation born in the 1980s, aka. the "post-80s" (balinghou), are among the most devout fans of this film, which they see as an embodiment of idealism, rebellion, nostalgia, and social criticism. Some scholars consider its comic nature, or "half-seriousness," to be the main reason for this cult following.

The modern reception of the film in Hong Kong and Taiwan is positive. At the 24th Hong Kong Film Awards various Asian film critics, film makers and actors voted for the top Chinese films from Hong Kong, Taiwan and China. A Chinese Ghost Story was listed at 50th place on the list. In 2011, the Taipei Golden Horse Film Festival had 122 industry professionals take part in the survey. The voters included film scholars, festival programmers, film directors, actors and producers to vote for the 100 Greatest Chinese-Language Films. A Chinese Ghost Story tied with Jia Zhangke's Xiao Wu (1997) and Zhang Yimou's The Story of Qiu Ju (1992) for 35th place on the list.

On the review aggregator website Rotten Tomatoes, 70% of 10 critics' reviews are positive, with an average rating of 7.8/10.

=== Awards and nominations ===
Event	Category	Recipient	Outcome
7th Hong Kong Film Awards	Best Film	A Chinese Ghost Story	Nominated
7th Hong Kong Film Awards	Best Director	Ching Siu-tung	Nominated
7th Hong Kong Film Awards	Best Actress	Joey Wong	Nominated
7th Hong Kong Film Awards	Best Supporting Actor	Wu Ma	Nominated
7th Hong Kong Film Awards	Best Cinematography	Poon Hang-sang, Tom Lau, Sander Lee, Horace Wong	Nominated
7th Hong Kong Film Awards	Best Film Editing	Cinema City Production Co. Ltd. Editing Unit	Nominated
7th Hong Kong Film Awards	Best Art Direction	Kenneth Yee	Won
7th Hong Kong Film Awards	Best Action Choreography	Ching Siu-tung, Philip Kwok, Lau Chi-ho, Alan Chui Chung-San, Bobby Wu	Nominated
7th Hong Kong Film Awards	Best Original Film Score	Romeo Diaz, James Wong	Won
7th Hong Kong Film Awards	Best Original Film Song	Song: Dawn, Please Do Not Come (黎明不要來) Composer/Lyricist: James Wong; Singer: Sally Yeh	Won
7th Hong Kong Film Awards	Best Original Film Song	Song: A Chinese Ghost Story (倩女幽魂) Composer/Lyricist: James Wong; Singer: Leslie Cheung	Nominated
7th Hong Kong Film Awards	Best Original Film Song	Song: Path (道) Composer/Lyricist:/Singer: James Wong	Nominated
24th Golden Horse Awards	Best Feature Film	A Chinese Ghost Story	Won
24th Golden Horse Awards	Best Supporting Actor	Wu Ma	Won
24th Golden Horse Awards	Best Adapted Screenplay	Yuen Kai-chi	Won
24th Golden Horse Awards	Best Film Editing	Cinema City Production Co. Ltd. Editing Unit	Won
24th Golden Horse Awards	Best Art Direction	Kenneth Yee	Nominated
24th Golden Horse Awards	Best Makeup & Costume Design	Shirley Chan	Won
24th Golden Horse Awards	Best Original Film Song	Song: Path (道) Composer/Lyricist: James Wong Singer: Leslie Cheung	Nominated
16th Avoriaz Fantastic Film Festival	Special Jury Award	Tsui Hark	Won
8th Fantafestival	Best Director	Ching Siu-tung	Won
8th Fantasporto Film Festival	Best Film Award	A Chinese Ghost Story	Won
24th Hong Kong Film Awards	Best 100 Chinese Motion Pictures (#50)	A Chinese Ghost Story	Won
1987 Sitges Film Festival	Best Special Effects	Cinefex Workshop Co., Ltd.	Won

== Subsequent media ==
The film was followed by two official sequels: A Chinese Ghost Story II (1990) and A Chinese Ghost Story III (1991), both directed by Ching Siu-tung and starring Joey Wong.

In 1997, producer Tsui Hark wrote and produced A Chinese Ghost Story: The Tsui Hark Animation, a loose animated reimagining of the first film's story.

In 2011, a new adaptation of Pu's short story was released, directed by Wilson Yip and starring Louis Koo and Liu Yifei.

In 2020, a Mainland Chinese remake entitled The Enchanting Phantom was released, directed by Lin Zhenzhao and starring Eleanor Lee and Chen Xing-xu.

== See also ==
- Qian Nü You Hun
- List of ghost films
