= A Chinese Ghost Story II =

1990 Hong Kong film by Ching Siu-tung

- Film poster
- Directed by: Ching Siu-tung
- Written by: Edward Leung Yiu-ming; Lam Kei-to (林紀陶); Lau Tai-muk (劉大木)
- Produced by: Tsui Hark
- Starring: Leslie Cheung; Joey Wong; Michelle Reis; Jacky Cheung
- Cinematography: Arthur Wong
- Edited by: Marco Mak
- Music by: James Wong Jim; Tang Siu-Lam; Romeo Díaz
- Production company: Film Workshop
- Release date: 13 July 1990 (Hong Kong)
- Running time: 104 minutes
- Country: Hong Kong
- Language: Cantonese

A Chinese Ghost Story II (Chinese: 倩女幽魂 II：人間道) is a 1990 Hong Kong romantic comedy horror film directed by Ching Siu-tung and produced by Tsui Hark. It is the sequel to A Chinese Ghost Story and is followed by A Chinese Ghost Story III.

== Plot ==
Following the events of the first film, Ning (Leslie Cheung) parts ways with the Taoist Yin (Wu Ma) and returns to his home village, which has since fallen on desperate times. Fleeing from cannibals, Ning is mistaken for a wanted criminal and imprisoned. Sharing a cell with Elder Chu, a renowned scholar, Ning apparently spends months languishing in prison. On the day of Ning's execution, the scholar reveals that he has dug out an escape tunnel. He gives Ning one of his books and a pendant and sends Ning through the tunnel.

Ning obliviously steals the horse of Autumn (Jacky Cheung), a Taoist sectarian with supernatural powers. When Ning stops for the night in an abandoned villa, Autumn catches up and the two sort out the misunderstanding. But in the middle of the night, rebel soldiers attack the two visitors from the trees. The rebel soldiers pretend to be ghosts, but Autumn, who is able to detect or smell the aura of ghosts and demons, penetrates their disguise. After a short skirmish, the rebel sisters Windy (Joey Wong) and Moon (Michelle Reis) discover Elder Chu's pendant. While Ning mistakes Windy for his love Siu Sin, whom she resembles, the rebels mistake Ning for the Elder Chu.

The sisters explain that their father, Lord Fu (Lau Siu-Ming), was framed for a crime and is now being transported to the place of his execution. The rebels' mission is to free him. They set off and leave Ning and Autumn at the villa. The next night, the two discover that the villa actually is haunted by a corpse-demon. In the ensuing battle, Autumn uses his powers to dismantle the walls of an old building and telekinetically move the walls, ramming them into the demon. He then uses talismans to incinerate the demon, cleaves the demon in two, and then uses a command word to incinerate it again. Despite being crushed by moving brick walls, cleaved in two, and severely burned, the demon still manages to flee. Autumn gives pursuit, using his supernatural powers to burrow through the ground, but ultimately fails to catch the demon.

He emerges at daybreak on a dirt road, causing an altercation with an imperial convoy led by Hu (Waise Lee). Autumn uses a freeze spell, commanding invisible spiritual soldiers to immobilize the soldiers and their horses. Hu and Autumn battle to a stalemate, and then after a brief conversation go their separate ways. Unbeknownst to Autumn, the convoy is the one carrying the sisters' father.

Having failed to catch the convoy earlier, the rebels return to the haunted villa, waiting to ambush the convoy there. As the convoy enters, however, the corpse-demon returns as well, having completely regenerated. Maneuvering Hu into fighting the demon, the rebels are able to rescue the sisters' father. The corpse-demon, despite having been cleaved into separate body parts, manages to continue wreaking havoc on the convoy. Autumn uses his powers to cause the corpse-demon's head and body, which are now fighting independently as separate units, to violently explode, thus killing the demon.

Before long, however, the androgynous Imperial High Monk arrives with his entourage. He incapacitates the rebels with a spell, which Autumn recognizes as an evil chant intended to hypnotize the group. Autumn stops up his ears with pieces of paper and proceeds to awaken the rest of the group. The Imperial High Monk assumes the form of a giant false buddha statue, and shoots lethal rays of golden energy, killing two group members on the spot. Autumn attempts to give fight, using his supernatural powers to try to magically explode the evil false buddha. The explosion is rebuffed by the evil false buddha and magically displaced, causing the group, including Autumn, to fly up into the air instead. Autumn gestures, shifting the cosmic forces of heaven and earth in order to issue a vortex of dark energy, but this attack is easily negated by the evil false buddha as well. Ning and Windy escape to seek the help of Yin, while Lord Fu, Autumn and Moon are captured by the evil monk. The captives are brought back to the High Monk's palace and put into a state of sleep to be eaten later.

Now suspicious, Hu enters the palace only to find the hollow corpses of the entire royal court inside. Recognizing that the monk is in reality a demon, Hu frees the captives and fights valiantly by himself to allow them time to recover. Lacking spiritual magic, however, Hu is not able to overcome the demon and is destroyed, although he manages to destroy the demon's entourage even after losing an arm.

Just then, Yin and the others arrive. Yin utters a mantra and the demon is forced to reveal its true form, a gigantic thousand-year-old centipede. Yin conjures an array of golden swords to attack the creature and draws on cosmic forces to blast the creature with bolts of energy. Autumn uses his powers to dislodge two large bodies of earth to crush the centipede.

The centipede appears dead, but actually survives and swallows both Taoist practitioners. To survive, Yin then recommends that he and Autumn separate their souls from their bodies. Autumn hesitates, saying his skill is insufficient to ensure a safe return to his body. Yin however goads Autumn into attempting it, saying there is no other way. Autumn eventually agrees and, following Yin's cue, also uses his powers to separate his soul from his body. The both of them then combine their efforts to destroy the centipede from the inside. Autumn, however, is not able to return to his body, just as he predicted, and his soul floats away.

The next day is the marriage of Windy to the Ma family. Ning runs down from his inn to the main street and tells Moon that he wishes Windy a long, happy marriage before leaving. In the desert, as Yin and Ning are about to continue their journey, they see two women approach on horseback, which happen to be Windy and Moon. Windy has escaped from her wedding and decides to leave with Ning.

== Cast and roles ==
- Leslie Cheung - Ning Choi San
- Joey Wong - Ching Fung / Windy
- Michelle Reis - Yuet Chi / Moon
- Jacky Cheung - Chi Chau / Autumn
- Wu Ma - Yin Chek Hsia / Swordsman
- Ku Feng - Elder Chu
- Lau Shun - High priest
- Lau Siu-Ming - Lord Fu
- Waise Lee - Hu
- To Siu-Chun
- Yeung Jing-Jing
- Lee Fai
- Lau Siu-Hung
- Johnny Koo

== Controversy in China ==
In 2019, the theme song of A Chinese Ghost Story II, "人間道" ("A Human's Path"), was pulled from Apple Music in China due to its association with the Tiananmen Square Massacre.

The song was pulled from the streaming service after users of Weibo pointed out that the lyrics were a veiled reference to the bloody 1989 incident, which saw the Chinese military violently disperse unarmed pro-democracy student protesters who were occupying the famous square, killing hundreds.
