= Peony Pavilion (film) =

2001 Hong Kong film by Yonfan

- Film poster for Peony Pavilion
- Chinese: 游园惊梦
- Directed by: Yonfan
- Written by: Yonfan
- Produced by: Ann Hui
- Starring: Joey Wang; Rie Miyazawa; Daniel Wu
- Cinematography: Henry Chung
- Release date: 6 April 2001
- Running time: 120 minutes
- Country: Hong Kong
- Language: Mandarin

Peony Pavilion (Simplified Chinese: 游园惊梦) is a 2001 Hong Kong drama film directed by Yonfan. It stars Joey Wang, Rie Miyazawa, and Daniel Wu, with Brigitte Lin as the narrator.

It was entered into the 23rd Moscow International Film Festival where Rie Miyazawa won the award for Best Actress.

== Plot ==
In 1930s Suzhou, Cui Hua, a courtesan from a tea house, marries into a nobleman's family as his fifth wife. During her time at the family mansion, she develops an intense relationship with her husband's female cousin, school teacher Rong Lan, through their shared love for Kunqu Opera.

Cui Hua and her adolescent daughter, Hui Hui, are constantly neglected by her husband. In her loneliness, Cui Hua becomes addicted to opium, and develops a friendship with the butler, who enlists in the army soon after. Eventually, Cui Hua and Hui Hui escape the mansion to live with Rong Lan.

Zhi Gang, a handsome examiner, arrives at Rong Lan's school on assignment from the education ministry. They soon begin seeing each other intimately, unbeknownst to Cui Hua. Rong Lan describes her feelings towards Cui Hua as indulgent, and compares her time spent with Zhi Gang as guilt-free.

Cui Hua receives news that the butler had died in the war, and learns of his feelings for her from his diary. In the same afternon, Cui Hua and Hui Hui bump into Rong Lan and Zhi Gang at the park. Zhi Gang insisted they all spend time together, but Rong Lan refuses. Zhi Gang leaves, and Cui Hua wanders off to cry by the pond alone.

That night, Cui Hua asks Rong Lan to invite Zhi Gang over for dinner, but Rong Lan keeps quiet. Cui Hua leaves to her room to smoke opium, despite her worsening health. Torn between both lovers, Rong Lan breaks down in tears.

Zhi Gang completes his assignment at Rong Lan's school and departs, leaving Rong Lan to grieve the loss of their brief infatuation.

Cui Hua burns the butler's diary, and spends a quiet night with Rong Lan reminiscing the times they've spent together. On a separate day, they visit the park with Hui Hui, and recall the day Cui Hua met Rong Lan and Zhi Gang. Rong Lan asked if Cui Hua cried because of the butler, or because of seeing her with Zhi Gang. Cui Hua doesn't answer. Rong Lan brushes it off and insist they leave it in the past. She reminisces the birthday celebration she threw for Cui Hua years ago, and called it the happiest day of their lives, while Cui Hua falls asleep on her shoulder.

== Cast ==
- Joey Wang as Rong Lan, a school teacher who occasionally dresses as a man.
- Rie Miyazawa as Cui Hua, a former courtesan, opera singer, and fifth wife of Rong Lan's cousin.
- Daniel Wu as Xing Zhi Gang, an examiner working for the education department.
- Brigitte Lin as Narrator
- Yonfan as Dance tutor

== Awards ==
Award	Date of ceremony	Category	Recipients and nominees	Result
38th Golden Horse Awards	December 8, 2001	Best Art Direction	Luo Zhongguo and Yan Zhanlin	Nominated
38th Golden Horse Awards	December 8, 2001	Best Makeup and Costume Design	Yonfan	Nominated
21st Hong Kong Film Awards	April 21, 2002	Best Cinematography	Henry Chung	Nominated
21st Hong Kong Film Awards	April 21, 2002	Best Art Direction	Lou Zhongguo and Yan Zhanlin	Won
21st Hong Kong Film Awards	April 21, 2002	Best Costume Makeup Design	Yonfan	Won
21st Hong Kong Film Awards	April 21, 2002	Best Original Film Song	Song: 明明 Composer: Chan San-Lie Lyricist: Yiu Him Singer: Sandy Lam	Nominated
23rd Moscow International Film Festival	June 21–30, 2001	Best Actress	Rie Miyazawa	Won
