= A Chinese Ghost Story: The Tsui Hark Animation =

1997 Hong Kong film by Andrew Chan

- Film poster

Chinese name
- Chinese: 小倩
Transcriptions
Standard Mandarin
- Hanyu Pinyin: Xiǎoqiàn
Yue: Cantonese
- Jyutping: Siu^{2}sin^{6}
- Directed by: Andrew Chan
- Written by: Tsui Hark
- Based on: "Nie Xiaoqian" by Pu Songling
- Produced by: Tsui Hark
- Edited by: Tsui Hark; Marco Mak Chi-sin
- Music by: Ricky Ho Kwok-kit
- Production company: Film Workshop; Triangle Staff; Win's Entertainment; Cathay Asia Films; PolyGram
- Distributed by: Golden Harvest (HK)
- Release dates: 26 July 1997 (HK); 21 November 1998 (Japan)
- Running time: 82 minutes
- Countries: Hong Kong; Japan
- Language: Cantonese

A Chinese Ghost Story: The Tsui Hark Animation (Chinese: 小倩; lit. 'Xiaoqian') is a 1997 fantasy animated film directed by Andrew Chan, written and produced by Tsui Hark. It is a spin-off and reimagining of the 1987 live-action film A Chinese Ghost Story and its sequels. The film was a co-production between Hark's Film Workshop and Japanese animation studio Triangle Staff.

It was released in Hong Kong on 26 July 1997. It won Best Animated Feature at the 34th Golden Horse Awards.

== Plot ==
Tax collector Ning wanders the land with his pet dog Solid Gold grieving over his lost love Siu Lan, who dumps him for another man. Along the way, he runs into two monks, White Cloud and Ten Miles. The two Buddhist monks, who appear to be trying to purify unholy spirits and send them to the underworld, are in a rivalry with another monk, Red Beard. After a meeting and a hasty farewell to the departing monks, Ning continues his journey.

Somehow, at night, Ning enters a ghost town, inhabited by many different monsters, ghouls and spirits. He tries to adjust himself to the street life there, but he realises that it is hard to fit in the life of the dead. He sees a beautiful woman named Shine in a carriage, and he falls in love with her. Unbeknownst to him, Shine is an agent of Madame Trunk, an evil tree spirit who devours life forces. Ning follows Shine and tries to make her acquaintance, but Shine at first tries selling him to Madame Trunk with the help of her friend, Butterfly. She eventually realises that Ning is a man who seems very different from what she thought.

When mayhem breaks out in the ghost town, it turns chaotic. Ning and Shine are caught up in it, and Ning saves Shine as they jump upon the Immortal Golden Dragon Train that ferries souls to the underworld to be reborn. Shine suggests they hitch a ride to safety, and so they do, getting off sometime later.

When morning arrives, Ning notices Shine is missing. He tries looking for her, only to realise she was hiding in his shadow under sunshine. She is a ghost, and any exposure to the sun will make her disappear, as she explains to Ning, and so he protects her. Ning sets her in his umbrella, then casts the umbrella in the water of a pond where she can survive, while he stays on land nearby and camps out. As they stay together, the two of them form a semi-romantic relationship. During their travels, Ning and Shine encounter Red Beard. Red Beard wants to slay Shine as it his profession, but when the group is attacked by the two monks, they flee to safety, with Red Beard's "robot" being destroyed trying to save them. Ning then pleads with Red Beard to not slay Shine, and Red Beard relents and promises he won't do any harm to Shine.

While Shine is away, Butterfly is heavily questioned by Madame Trunk about where Shine is. Butterfly tries to deny the fact she knew anything, but eventually, under torture, she reveals Shine is with the human man Ning. Madame Trunk, who is running low on life force, is desperate to get Ning so she can live, and enlists Butterfly to get them.

At night, Ning and Shine return to the city, where a celebration is taking place. Mountain Evil, a mountain spirit, seen as a superstar, performs that night and charms Shine into staying with him. But when Shine accidentally pulls one of his long, white, elegant hairs that he claims nobody except him should touch, he is enraged. He tries to punish her, but the two monks appear and attack the ghost town. Ten Miles handles the ghost citizens, while White Cloud takes care of Mountain Evil. In the onslaught, Mountain Evil's hair is completely shaven by White Cloud, who thinks that his hair should be shaven like his to repent. But Mountain Evil tries to flee back into his mountain form, dragging Shine with him. Shine manages to escape, and she and Ning settle in a forest for the night.

Shine reveals her background working for Madame Trunk, and Ning tells her he would do anything to free her, even losing his life force to Madame Trunk. Shine takes him to Madame Trunk, but when she changes her mind at the last moment, realizing that she loves him and letting him be sacrificed for her freedom makes her selfish, she tries to save Ning. Butterfly understands the situation and when she realises humans can coexist with spirits, helps Shine by ensuring Ning and Shine's escape. Because Madame Trunk has no more life force with Ning taken away from her, she rots and disappears, thus breaking the bond Shine is bound to.

Shine admits she loves Ning since he helped her so much, and Ning returns her love, but worries that humans and spirits can't be together. While they share a tranquil moment, Mountain Evil appears and tries to take Shine away for the punishment she evaded from earlier. They hide, and when the Immortal Golden Dragon Train arrives, they seek refuge in it. Mountain Evil tries to attack the train, but is seen by Red Beard who destroys him. Ning asks Red Beard why he would do such a thing. Red Beard claims that he understood spirits now and destroying the unholy ones are what he should do, not just to destroying all spirits indiscriminately.

Shine then suggests that she be reborn to stay with Ning together as they go through the Heavenly gates. Ning agrees that he'll reborn to be with her, but White Cloud and Ten Miles appear to purify the spirits. Red Beard goes to duel with them, while Ning and Shine alter the train's course to take them safely to the gates. In the scuffle that follows, Ning is thrown into the gates as they are sealing shut, the path they took having delayed them too long. Ning struggles to keep the gates open as the train passes through him. Shine catches him and flies into the portal of rebirth, but they then have to get past the hammers of mismemory that will wipe out all spirits' memories before they are reborn.

White Cloud, Ten Miles and Red Beard fall into the portal, where they are reborn into babies. Ning and Shine are separated, but Shine manages to tell Ning the location to look for her when she is reborn. Ning awakens in a village where he sees the two baby monks and a baby Red Beard, and meets his former lover Siu Lan, who carries a newborn child which Ning thinks is Shine. He takes the child to the meeting place, but realises the baby is a boy and Siu Lan arrives, attacking Ning and taking her baby back. Ning thinks he has lost Shine forever, but when he sees his umbrella acting strangely, he casts it in the water of a nearby river and dives in. Shine appears, an ecstatic Ning swims madly down the river, and the two of them reunite as Solid Gold smiles before the film ends, with the scene turned to a Chinese painting as the credits roll.

== Voice cast ==
Role	Cantonese	Mandarin	Japanese	English
Ning	Jan Lamb	Nicky Wu	Akira Ishida	Michael Donovan
Siu Sin (Seen) / Shine	Anita Yuen	Sylvia Chang	Megumi Hayashibara	Nicole Oliver
Siu Lan / Lan	Vivian Lai	Linda Wong	Atsuko Yuya	Janyse Jaud
Solid Gold	Tsui Hark	Tsui Hark	Tsui Hark	Scott McNeil
Ten Miles / Monk Shi Fang	Eric Kot	Alec Su		Matt Smith
White Cloud / Reverend Bai Yun	Raymond Wong	Sammo Hung	Chikao Ohtsuka	Richard Newman
Red Beard / Yan Chi Xia	Wong Jim	Lee Li-chun	Kenji Utsumi	Don Brown
Siu Deep / Butterfly	Charlie Yeung	Rene Liu	Yukari Tamura	Venus Terzo
Madame Trunk	Kelly Chen	Yonfan	Yukari Nozawa	Shirley Millner
Mountain Evil	Jordan Chan	Lo Ta-yu	Akio Otsuka	Scott McNeil
Siu Lan Fu	Ronald Cheng	Ronald Cheng		

== Production ==
The story is loosely based on a short story titled Nie Xiaoqian from the ancient Chinese literary work Strange Stories from a Chinese Studio by Pu Songling. Despite its title, the film has no narrative relationship to the A Chinese Ghost Story film series that were produced by Tsui Hark between 1987 and 1991. The films title in Hong Kong refers to the Shine's name in Chinese. Richard James Havis echoed this, writing for the South China Morning Post, he said the film kept the bare bones of the original film, with the a female ghost seeking to lay her spirits to rest with the help of her mortal lover is where the similarity to the original film ends. The publication said it was close to Japanese anime series like Dragonball Z which was popular at the time.

The director of the film was Andrew Chan. Chan had worked in animated television series in Japan and had eight years experience of making animated television commercials. The film had a budget of HK$40 million, an amount that was expensive for a Hong Kong film production and also took much longer than the average Hong Kong film to make, where it took four years to create. The characters were designed by the Hong Kong-based Frankie Chung. There were only three animators working on the film in Hong Kong. The illustrations were sent to Japan's Japanese studio Triangle Staff or to Korean studios, to be animated. Tetsuya Endō (My Neighbor Totoro) was the film's animation director, and Takashi Nakamura (Akira) was the character designer and layout artist. The 3D animation in the film work was done in Hong Kong by Cinefex.

The films script for the English dub was by Trish Ledoux. It was dubbed into English by Ocean Productions.

== Release ==
A Chinese Ghost Story: The Tsui Hark Animation was released in Hong Kong on July 26, 1997. It grossed a total of HK$ 8,163,420 on its release. It was screened as part of the Midnight Madness selection at the 1997 Toronto International Film Festival. The film had its American premiere in Dallas, Texas as the Kidfilm Festival which ran from January 17 to 18 in 1998.

=== Home media ===
The film was licensed to Viz Video, with a home video release planned for 1999. The film was screened at San Francisco's 4 Star Theater on March 19, 1999 in Cantonese with English subtitles. This was Viz Communication's first theatrical release. A review in the Anime News Network later commented that this theatrical release had poor subtitles.

== Reception ==
=== Critical response ===
Variety gave the film a positive review, calling the film "a considerable accomplishment" with animation that was "reasonably fluid, colorings are vivid, and backgrounds have a fragility that recalls Chinese landscapes, though in an accessible, unscholarly way. Running time could easily take a few trims without losing much."

=== Awards and nominations ===
Institution	Year	Category	Nominee	Result
Asia Pacific Film Festival	1998	Best Animated Film	Andrew Chan	Won
Hong Kong Film Critics Society	1998	Film of Merit	—N/a	Won
Golden Horse Awards	1997	Best Animated Feature	—N/a	Won
Golden Horse Awards	1997	Best Adapted Screenplay	Tsui Hark	Nominated
Golden Horse Awards	1997	Best Original Film Score	Ricky Ho	Nominated
