= Painted Skin (1992 film) =

1992 Hong Kong film by King Hu

Painted Skin 畫皮之陰陽法王
- Theatrical poster
- Directed by: King Hu; Alan Chui Chung-San (Martial Arts Director)
- Written by: King Hu; Ah Cheng
- Starring: Adam Cheng; Joey Wong; Sammo Hung; Lam Ching-ying
- Production company: New Treasurer Films
- Distributed by: Mandarin Films Distribution Co. Ltd.
- Release dates: September 1992 (Tokyo International Film Festival); 18 September 1993 (Hong Kong)
- Running time: 94 minutes
- Country: Hong Kong
- Language: Cantonese
- Box office: HK $1,315,857

Painted Skin
- Traditional Chinese: 畫皮之陰陽法王
- Simplified Chinese: 画皮之阴阳法王
Transcriptions
Standard Mandarin
- Hanyu Pinyin: Huàpí zhī Yīnyáng Fǎwáng
Yue: Cantonese
- Jyutping: waak6 pei4 zi1 jam1 joeng4 faat3 wong4

Painted Skin (Chinese: 畫皮之陰陽法王) is a 1992 Hong Kong supernatural horror film starring Adam Cheng, Joey Wong, Sammo Hung, Lam Ching Ying, and Wu Ma. It was directed by King Hu.

It is based, very loosely, on a famous story in Pu Songling's classic short story collection Strange Stories from a Chinese Studio.

The choreography was designed by Alan Chui Chung-San.

== Story ==
A scholar encounters a beautiful maiden in an alley on his way home and leads her to his house, where he tries to marry her as a concubine. By chance, his wife and he discover that she is in fact a ghost, who must "paint" and graft a facial skin mask over her face to look human. Terrified, the scholar enlists the help of two Taoist priests, who give him a magic whisk to keep the ghost at bay. However, it appears that the ghost is benign – she merely wants to escape the clutches of an evil Yin-Yang King, a faceless, powerful spirit-king who shuttles at ease between the mortal world and the spirit, and who seems to be controlling the destinies of some recently deceased souls.

The two Taoist priests battle the King to release the ghost, but realize their magical prowess is not sufficient. Instead, they use the ghost to track down a highly skilled Taoist Master in the countryside. Meanwhile, the Yin-Yang King has possessed the scholar and is wreaking havoc in the mortal plane. The priests finally discover and convince the Taoist Master, who decides to destroy the evil spirit-king so as to guide the ghost back to Hades.

== Cast ==
- Adam Cheng
- Joey Wong
- Sammo Hung
- Lam Ching-ying
- Wu Ma
- Lau Shun

== Production ==
Painted Skin was the last film directed by King Hu. Its filming locations included Mount Wutai, Ming tombs, and Huairou.

== Reception ==
The film was released in the Tokyo International Film Festival in September 1992, and in Hong Kong in September 1993, and the box office was HK $1,315,857. It received generally mixed to negative reviews when it was released in Hong Kong, and also received some positive reviews in 2020.
