= Yonfan =

Hong Kong film director and photographer (born 1947)

Yon Fan
- 楊凡
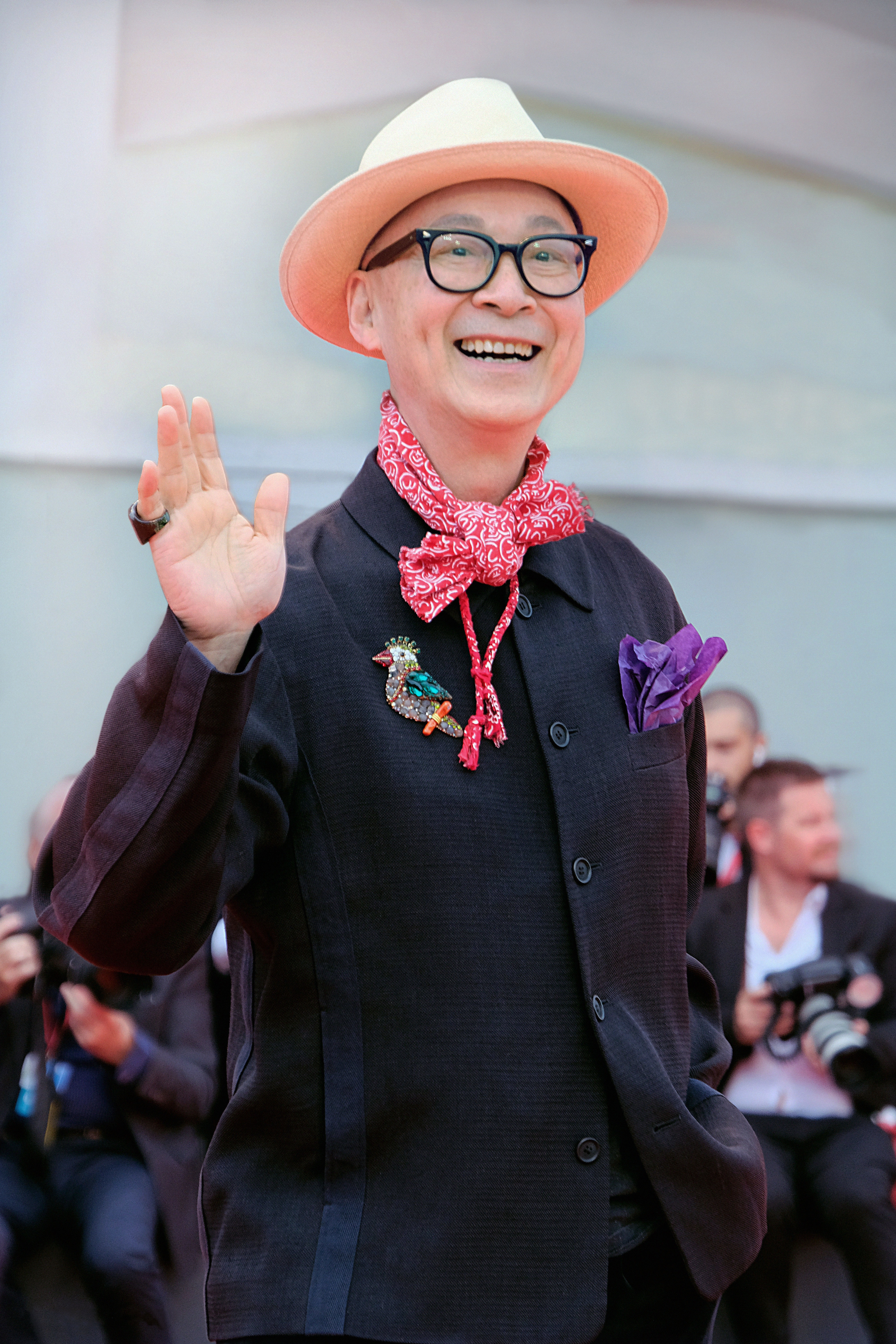
- Yonfan in 2020
- Born: 14 October 1947 (age 78); Wuhan, Hubei, Republic of China

Chinese name
- Traditional Chinese: 楊凡
- Simplified Chinese: 杨凡
Transcriptions
Standard Mandarin
- Hanyu Pinyin: Yáng Fán

Yonfan (born 14 October 1947) is a Hong Kong film director and photographer.

== Biography ==
He was born in Wuhan, Hubei, Republic of China. As the Yang family emigrated from mainland China, they lived first in Hong Kong for 3 years, and then moved to Taiwan when Yonfan was 5 years old. He spent most of his childhood and adolescence in Taichung, Taiwan, and returned to Hong Kong in 1964 as a 17-year-old man to work as a photographer, but left for the United States in 1968 to study film. After a couple of years travelling through the United States, France and Britain, he returned to Hong Kong in 1973, and became a photographer noted for his celebrity portraits.

In 1984, he made his box office debut as a director with A Certain Romance. Two years later, Yonfan adapted the much-loved romantic novel The Story of Rose by Yi Shu. Starring an up-and-coming Maggie Cheung, the passionate Lost Romance was a huge commercial success starring a young Chow Yun-fat.

After In Between (1994), Yonfan started to steer away from the mainstream market and began to introduce characters from the marginalised sections of society. With 1998 came another milestone, Bishonen, best known for its romantic cinematography and explicit portrayal of homosexual onscreen passion. Inspired by a real-life scandal in which a Hong Kong playboy was found to possess more than a thousand nude photographs of local police officers, this melodramatic tale of redemption polarized film critics in Hong Kong, but was very well received at film festivals around the globe. It also launched the acting career of heartthrob Daniel Wu.

His 2001 film Peony Pavilion was entered into the 23rd Moscow International Film Festival.

In 2010, Yonfan was head of the jury at Hong Kong's Asian Film Awards in March and was part of the jury of the Sydney Film Festival in May.

In 2011, Yonfan headed the New Currents jury at the 16th Busan International Film Festival in October. The Festival also hosted a retrospective of the director's films, featuring seven of his restored and re-mastered films from the 1980s through 2000s.

== Filmography ==
Year	English Title	Original Title	Notes
1984	A Certain Romance	少女日記	
1986	Lost Romance	玫瑰的故事	
1986	Immortal Story	海上花	
1987	Double Fixation	意亂情迷	
1988	Last Romance	流金歲月	
1990	Promising Miss Bowie	祝福	
1994	In Between	新同居時代	
1995	Bugis Street	妖街皇后	
1998	Bishonen	美少年の戀	
2001	Peony Pavilion	遊園驚夢	
2003	Breaking the Willow	鳳冠情事	
2004	Colour Blossoms	桃色	
2009	Prince of Tears	淚王子	
2019	No.7 Cherry Lane	繼園臺七號	
2026	Intermission	中场休息	

== See also ==
- Cinema of Hong Kong
- Cinema of China
