= A Chinese Ghost Story III =

1991 Hong Kong romantic comedy horror film

- Film poster

Chinese name
- Traditional Chinese: 倩女幽魂III：道道道
- Simplified Chinese: 倩女幽魂III：道道道
Transcriptions
Standard Mandarin
- Hanyu Pinyin: Qiàn Nǚ Yōu Hún Sān: Dào Dao Dào
Yue: Cantonese
- Jyutping: Sin6 Neoi2 Jau1 Wan4 Saam1: Dou6 Dou6 Dou6
- Directed by: Ching Siu-tung
- Screenplay by: Roy Szeto; Tsui Hark
- Produced by: Tsui Hark
- Starring: Tony Leung Chiu-Wai; Jacky Cheung; Joey Wong; Nina Li Chi
- Cinematography: Tom Lau
- Edited by: Marco Mak
- Music by: James Wong; Romeo Diaz; Chow Kam-wing
- Production companies: Golden Princess Film Production; Film Workshop
- Distributed by: Golden Princess Amusement
- Release date: 18 July 1991
- Running time: 104 minutes
- Country: Hong Kong
- Language: Cantonese
- Box office: HK$15,018,584

A Chinese Ghost Story III (Chinese: 倩女幽魂 III：道道道; Jyutping: Sinneoi Jauwan III: Dou Dou Dou) is a 1991 Hong Kong romantic comedy horror film directed by Ching Siu-tung and produced by Tsui Hark. It is the sequel to A Chinese Ghost Story and A Chinese Ghost Story II.

Joey Wong returns as a ghostly beauty bound in servitude to the Tree Demon. The Tree Demon's seal, as cast by the monk Yin (Wu Ma) in the original film, only lasts for 100 years. Now 100 years later, the Tree Demon awakens.

== Plot ==
The film starts with a flashback to the first film, with Taoist Yin sealing away the tree demon. He tells the scholar Ning Tsai Shen that it will reawaken in 100 years.

100 years later, two Buddhist monks, master Bai Yun and his inept disciple Shi Fang, are transporting a golden statue of Buddha. On their travels, they meet the relatively honorable mercenary Taoist Yin (It is revealed later that he was named after the Taoist swordsman Yin from the first movie and had even been rejected by him when he asked to be his student.) When talking to a merchant, Yin accidentally cuts the roof off Shi fang's backpack revealing the golden Buddha statue. Beset by the thieves and ne'er-do-wells in the villages, the monks go to spend the night at the local temple, which is none other than the Orchid Temple of the first film. Unknown to the monks, they were followed by bandits from town. As the bandits make a move on them, one of them trips over a corpse arm and mistakes it for a ghost tripping him, causing them to run off scared since Lotus Temple was rumored to be haunted. As the bandits run off they hear female ghosts singing and mistake them to be living humans. The bandits then are captured by the tree demon and are all killed.

While meditating, the monks hear the commotion and master Bai Yun goes to investigate, telling Shi Fang to stay in the temple. The tree demon knows of the residing monks and tells a female ghost, Lotus, to go and seduce Shi Fang. Lotus tries to seduce him many times the first night, but after he finds out she is a ghost she attempts to kill him on orders from the tree demon. He saves himself by reciting mantras repelling her. Despite this, he lets Lotus go out of compassion before his master comes back. Over the next few nights, Shi Fang is visited by Lotus again and the two become fond of each other.

However, another ghost, Butterfly, becomes suspicious of Lotus. Being rivals for the favor of the Tree Demon, Butterfly plots to capture the monk and expose her sister's betrayal. When the Tree Demon attempts to take Shi Fang, Bai Yun intervenes and uses his staff to transport his disciple to safety. In the ensuing battle with the Tree Demon, the master himself is captured.

Shi Fang enlists Yin to help rescue his master, and feels he must also help Lotus by recovering her urn. Yin and the master do battle with the Tree Demon using Taoist and Buddhist supernatural skills together, destroying it. Though he disapproves of his disciple's relationship with the ghost, the master helps to save Lotus as well. However, after the Tree Demon's destruction, the Black Mountain Demon takes up the pursuit of Yin, Shi Fang, Master Bai Yun and Lotus. He summons high pillars to block their escape route and darkens the sky so the sunlight cannot shine on earth.

Master Bai Yun then casts a spell on Shi Fang and covers his body with his own blood, which has taken on a golden colour because of his accumulated spiritual energy. Lotus then takes Shi Fang up to the sky above the dark clouds so that Shi Fang can use his golden body to channel the power of the Buddha to break the demon's barrier of darkness so the sunlight can re-enter the earth. In the end, the Black Mountain Demon is killed by sunlight, and the sky clears. Shi Fang thinks Lotus may have been killed by the sunlight, and starts looking for her. He finds Lotus hiding under a pile of rocks, safe from the sun, and Lotus tells Shi Fang that her spirit will follow him when he takes her urn away from the temple.

== Cast ==
- Tony Leung Chiu-Wai as Monk Shi Fang
- Jacky Cheung as Swordsman Yin
- Joey Wong as Lotus
- Nina Li Chi as Butterfly
- Lau Siu-ming as Tree Devil (Lao Lao)
- Lau Shun as Shi Fang's Master/ Reverend Bai Yun
- Lau Yuk-ting as Jade
- Tommy Wong as Man with Yin in teahouse
- Sam Hoh as Rascal
