= Fractured Follies =

1988 Hong Kong film by Wong Chung

- DVD cover
- Traditional Chinese: 長短腳之戀
- Simplified Chinese: 长短脚之恋
- Hanyu Pinyin: cháng duǎn jiǎo zhī liàn
- Jyutping: coeng4 dyun2 goek3 zi1 lyun2
- Directed by: Wong Chung
- Written by: Cheung Yim Kong; Rico Chung Kai Cheong; Lam Goon Kiu; Sunny Leung Yat San; Lung Tin Sang; Wong Chung; Yuen Chun Man
- Produced by: Dean Shek
- Starring: Chow Yun-fat; Joey Wong; James Wong; Nina Li Chi; Wong Ching; Bonnie Law; Cheng Mang-Ha
- Cinematography: James Chan Hau-Ming
- Edited by: Wong Ming-Lam
- Music by: Antonio "Tony" Arevalo Jr.
- Production company: Cinema City
- Distributed by: Cinema City
- Release date: 7 July 1988 (Hong Kong)
- Running time: 95 minutes
- Country: Hong Kong
- Language: Cantonese
- Box office: HK $11,958,211.00

Fractured Follies (Chinese: 長短腳之戀; pinyin: cháng duǎn jiǎo zhī liàn) is a 1988 Hong Kong romantic comedy film directed by Wong Chung, it stars Chow Yun-fat, Joey Wong, James Wong, Nina Li Chi, Wong Ching, Bonnie Law and Mengxia Zheng. The film ran in theaters from 7 July 1988 until 25 July 1988.

== Plot ==
May (Joey Wong), is a girl who was born with one leg an inch shorter than a normal person. One day while she and her family was cleaning their supermarket they had just bought, May gets hit by a taxi driven by Joe (Chow Yun-fat). Thinking he is the one that crippled May, he volunteers to work for May's family supermarket to repay her medical bills. Scarlet (Nina Li Chi), May's cousin, has her sights set on Joe, but Joe himself was falling for May. After some advice from the Buddha, Joe finally has the courage to ask May out. On the other hand, Joe's friend Sea (Wong Ching) was falling for Scarlet, with Joe's help, he managed to win her heart.

== Cast ==
- Chow Yun-fat as Joe Leung (梁少祖) - May's spouse, taxi driver before he worked for May's family
- Joey Wong as May Yau (游靜文) - Joe's spouse, born with one leg an inch shorter than a normal person
- James Wong as Yau Kwong Nam (游江南) - May's father
- Nina Li Chi as Scarlet (紅菱) - Has a crush on Joe, married to Sea in the end
- Wong Ching as Sea (梁少海) - Scarlet's spouse
- Bonnie Law as Cher Leung (梁小珊) - Joe and Sea's friend, gets scammed by a producer for nudes
- Cheng Mang-Ha as May's grandmother
- Chan Lap-Ban as Matchmaker
- Gam Lui as Porno cd producer boss
- Pei Yun as Temple worshipper
- Wang Yi-Fei as Nam's cousin (cameo)
- Lung Tin-Sang as Guest at Joe's wedding (uncredited)
- Lee Sam as Robber (uncredited)

== Critical response ==
"Okay, so it's not sophisticated humor, but this is a great comedy romance with two HK greats, Chow Yun-Fat and Joey Wong......The romance between Joe and May is sweet and has some awfully cute moments......Lots of fun. Put your brain in neutral and give it a watch." ----- IMDb (6.0/10 based on 143 user reviews)

"Fractured Follies is a pleasant little romantic comedy that isn't anything that's really going to make you laugh out loud or cry your eyes out, but it's not going to make you clutch your head in disbelief, either.......Fractured Follies accomplishes what it ostensibly set out to do -- deliver some nice fluffy entertainment." ----- hkfilm.net (6/10)

On the Chinese movie review website, Douban, it received an average rating of 6.8 out of 10 based on 6599 user reviews.
