= Romeo Diaz =

Hong Kong musician and composer

- Born: 1948 or 1949; Hong Kong
- Other names: Lo-dik; Tai Lok-man
- Occupations: Composer, record producer, music director
- Musical career
- Genres: Film score, beat, rock, Cantopop
- Years active: 1960s-1994
- Formerly of: Danny Diaz & The Checkmates, Musicad

Chinese name
- Traditional Chinese: 戴樂民
- Simplified Chinese: 戴乐民
Transcriptions
Standard Mandarin
- Hanyu Pinyin: Dài Lè Mín
Yue: Cantonese
- Jyutping: Daai^{3} Lok^{6} Man^{4}

Alternative Chinese name
- Traditional Chinese: 羅迪
- Simplified Chinese: 罗迪
Transcriptions
Standard Mandarin
- Hanyu Pinyin: Luó Dí
Yue: Cantonese
- Jyutping: Lo^{4} Dik^{6}

Romeo Diaz (born 1948 or 1949), known in Chinese as Tai Lok-man (戴樂民), is a Hong Kong composer, record producer, and musician of Filipino descent.

He was one of the members of the popular band Danny Diaz & The Checkmates in Hong Kong in the 1960s along with his two brothers, Danny Diaz and Rudy Diaz. He later became a composer of film scores, particularly working with filmmakers Tsui Hark, Corey Yuen, and Ching Siu-tung, and musician James Wong Jim. He won the Hong Kong Film Award for Best Original Film Score for A Terra-Cotta Warrior (1990).

== Early life ==
Diaz was born in 1948 or 1949 in Hong Kong and is of Filipino descent. He was initially known by the Chinese name Lo-dik (traditional Chinese: 羅迪; simplified Chinese: 罗迪). His father was a professional musician, and he has eight siblings who were all musically savvy. When Diaz was 17 or 18 years old, his father lost his job, causing Diaz and his brothers to start performing at nightclubs to financially support their family. They attended La Salle College but after school officials found out about their occupation, they had to drop out.

== Career ==
Diaz began his musical career in the 1960s as a member of the Hong Kong pop group Danny Diaz & The Checkmates with his two brothers, Danny Diaz and Rudy Diaz. The trio won The Battle of the Sounds, a music competition hosted by Levi's where musical groups competed in a football stadium for a $10,000 prize and funding to do worldwide travel. Diaz played the organ, piano, saxophone and flute. Teddy Robin received second place in the competition that year. The StarPhoenix's Ned Powers praised a 1974 performance the group had at The A-Four club in Saskatoon, writing, "A convincing piece amidst all of this is 'Joy', by Bach, a fine instrumental built mostly around Romeo's work on organ and flute." The South China Morning Post reviewed a performance the trio did in 1977 at the Harbour Room. The newspaper praised Diaz for being "superb on alto" and for his "show-stopping rendition" of the song "The First Time Ever I Saw Your Face". Noting that Diaz did the group's musical arrangements, the South China Morning Post lauded him for creating "an excellent arrangement along the lines of something that Ray Conniff might have done".

Between early 1969 and April 1973, the band performed at the Mandarin Oriental, Hong Kong. The South China Morning Post's Mansha Daswani said, "until 1972, the trio were regarded as among Hong Kong's premier entertainers". The trio moved from Hong Kong to Acapulco, Mexico, in 1973. In 1975, they moved from Acapulco to Canada. The trio in 1982 ended their band. Danny Diaz explained, "Individually, we each decided it was time. There's life beyond a band and life beyond brothers." In the 1980s, Romeo Diaz relocated back to Hong Kong, where Daswani said he "gained considerable success in the Canto-pop industry".

In the 1970 he started to compose for many singers in Hong Kong and Asia. In 1983 he became the resident musical director for EMI records in Hong Kong. James Wong changed Diaz's Chinese name from Lo-dik to Tai Lok-man (traditional Chinese: 戴樂民; simplified Chinese: 戴乐民) in 1987 as Wong felt the previous name was unsuitable for a musician.

=== Film scoring ===
In 1984 he started music production company, Musicad, that won a lot of awards for advertising campaigns throughout its operation. He has worked in close partnership with a composer and talk-show host, James Wong, and he has also collaborated with film directors such as Louis Ng, Tsui Hark, Zhang Yimou and John Woo.

Diaz received the Hong Kong Film Award for Best Original Film Score three times. He composed music for the 1987 film A Chinese Ghost Story for which he received that award at the 7th Hong Kong Film Awards. The second time he received it was at the 10th Hong Kong Film Awards for a collaboration with Joseph Koo for the 1990 film A Terra-Cotta Warrior. The third time he received the award was at the 11th Hong Kong Film Awards for a collaboration with James Wong Jim for the 1991 film Once Upon a Time in China.

== Personal life ==
Romeo Diaz is married to Christine Samson who was in the 1960s band D'Topnotes. He has two children, Adam and Krystal Diaz. He lives in Hong Kong.

=== Children ===
- Adam Diaz (Chinese: 戴乾亨) is a composer, arranger, record producer, and guitarist of Hong Kong local bands. He was a guitarist in the Hong Kong band Dear Jane.
- Krystal Diaz (Chinese: 戴晶兒) is a singer-songwriter who was a vocal coach on the third season of TVB's singing competition The Voice.

== Filmography ==
Year	Title	Director	Notes
1985	Yes, Madam	Corey Yuen	
1986	Righting Wrongs	Corey Yuen	
1986	Royal Warriors	David Chung	
1987	A Chinese Ghost Story	Ching Siu-tung	
1988	Fury	Wang Lung-wei	
1988	I Love Maria	David Chung	
1988	Bet on Fire	Joe Cheung	
1989	Casino Raiders	Jimmy Heung; Wong Jing	
1989	A Terra-Cotta Warrior	Ching Siu-tung	
1989	Just Heroes	John Woo; Wu Ma	
1990	Bullet in the Head	John Woo	
1990	The Swordsman	King Hu; Ching Siu-tung; Tsui Hark; Raymond Lee	
1991	A Chinese Ghost Story III	Ching Siu-tung	
1991	Once Upon a Time in China	Tsui Hark	
1993	City Hunter	Wong Jing	
1993	Fong Sai-yuk	Corey Yuen	
1993	Jia ri qing wei le	Kevin Chu	
1994	The Great Conqueror's Concubine	Stephen Shin	

== Accomplishments ==
- Best Original Film Score for the film Fight and Love with a Terracotta Warrior at the 10th Hong Kong Film Awards
- Silver place of the Best Commercial Song Awards at the RTHK Top 10 Gold Songs Awards in 1991
