= Sally Yeh =

Hong Kong and Canadian singer and actress

- 葉蒨文
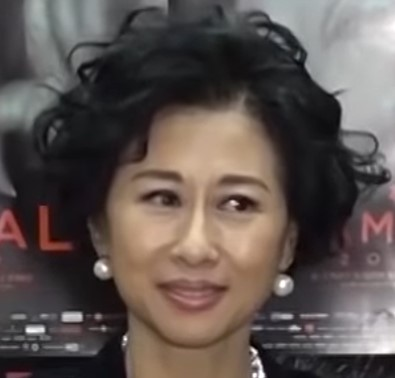
- Yeh in 2019
- Pronunciation: Yip6 Sin6 Man4
- Occupations: Singer; actress
- Years active: 1979–present
- Spouse: George Lam (m. 1996)
- Awards: Hong Kong Film Awards – Best Original Film Song; 1988 A Chinese Ghost Story Golden Melody Awards – Best Female Mandarin Artist; 1994
- Musical career
- Origin: Taiwan
- Genres: Cantopop; Mandopop

Chinese name
- Traditional Chinese: 葉蒨文
- Simplified Chinese: 叶倩文
Transcriptions
Standard Mandarin
- Hanyu Pinyin: Yè Qiànwén
Yue: Cantonese
- Jyutping: jip6 sin3 man4

Sally Yeh, sometimes credited as Sally Yip or Yip Sin-man, is a singer and former actress. She has been described as a cultural icon and a voice of unparalleled grace in Hong Kong during the 1980s and 1990s, when Cantopop music reigned supreme across the region and the city's cinema captivated the world.

== Career ==
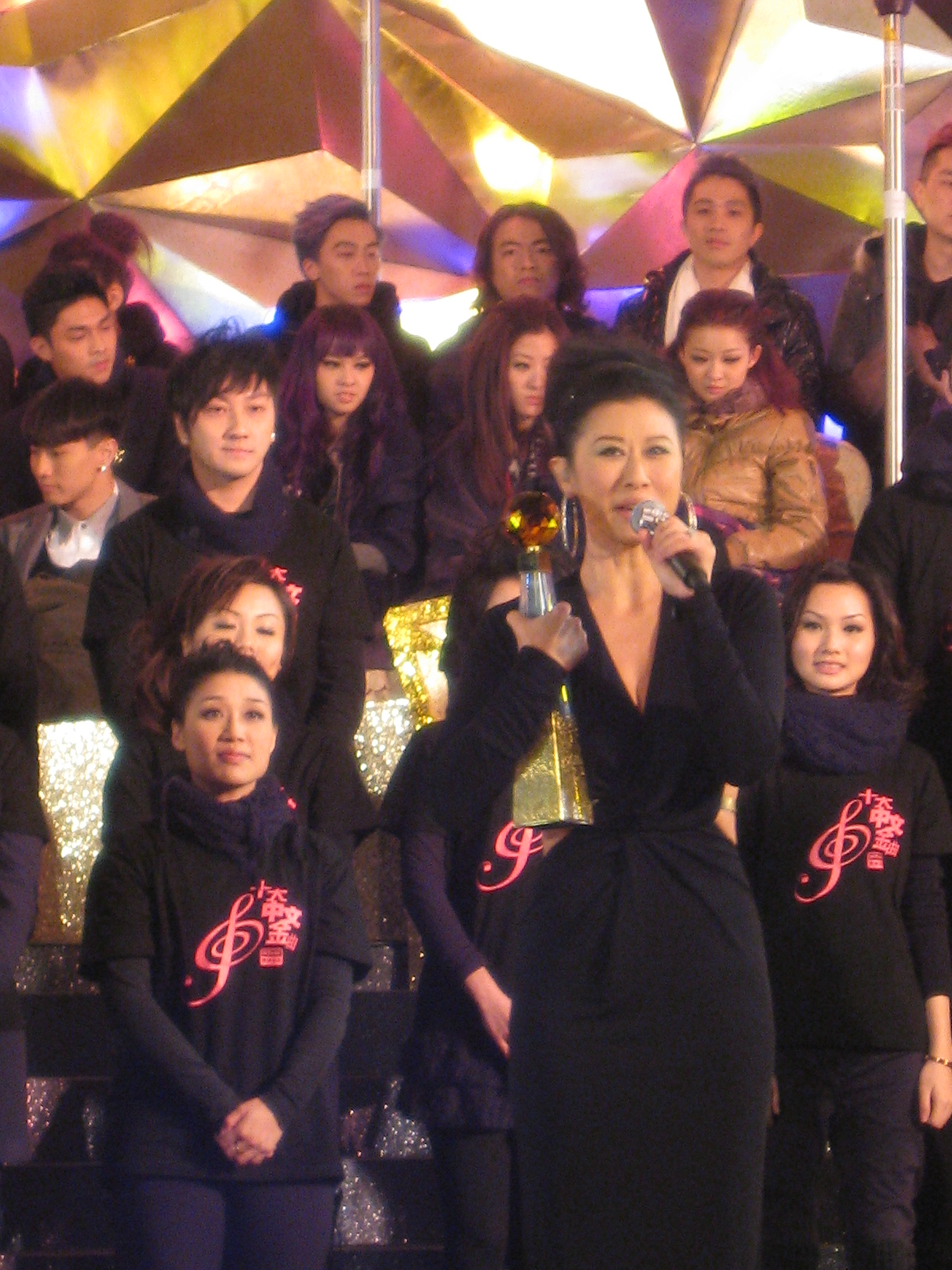
Yeh performing in January 2011

Yeh's singing career started in the early 1980s, and her acting career started shortly thereafter, because she was singing songs specifically written for film soundtracks. She has released a total of thirty studio albums, plus compilations and live recordings.

Yeh first relocated to Taiwan to pursue a career in singing, and later relocated to Hong Kong, which at the time was the primary center of Chinese entertainment, for a better chance at fame. Ng Ching Yuen, who was the CEO of Warner Music Hong Kong, arranged for her then-husband, George Lam, to teach Yeh to sing and speak Hong Kong Cantonese.

Since then, Yeh has focused primarily on the Hong Kong Cantonese entertainment world. With the support of utilizing romanization to read Chinese characters in Mandarin and Cantonese in addition to her interactions within the Chinese entertainment business, she began to make improvements on both her spoken Mandarin and Cantonese, including reading Chinese characters. However, because she never had a formal Chinese education, her proficiency in reading Chinese is still limited on various levels. When Yeh has to read Chinese characters, she still relies on Mandarin romanization and Cantonese romanization for support.

During the 1990s in some of the music award and entertainment shows she participated in, she was able to demonstrate her proficiency in reading Chinese to some extents but struggled at times. In some examples, in the 1993 Jade Solid Gold Awards when she had to read out two written Chinese names of the female singers being nominated for an award that were written on tennis balls, she was able to read out Faye Wong's name, but struggled to read out Vivian Chow's name. In 1994 Jade Solid Gold Awards, she along with other singers were playing a word puzzle on a large board needing to figure out the song titles by filling in the empty spaces next to the few hinted words already written down, Sally was able to figure out the full title of the song she was guessing by seeing a few of the Chinese words already written down without the need for romanizations but upon needing to fill it out, she found it easier to write out the English phonetics of the song titles than to write out the complicated strokes of the Chinese characters needed to be written down.

In a July 2022 interview on CGTN's The Point, Yeh admitted that over the years of her career singing Chinese songs, very often she is not able to fully understand the lyrics and has to listen to the arrangements of the music to be able to appropriately relate to the emotions of the songs.

Yeh has received the Most Popular Hong Kong Female Singer award at the Jade Solid Gold Best Ten Music Awards four times (1990, 1991, 1992, and 1993). In 1992, Yeh collaborated with a couple of other western artists, recording "I'm Always Dreaming of You" with Tommy Page in 1992 and "I Believe in Love" with James Ingram the following year.

In 2002, Yeh re-entered the Cantopop market, released the record "Can You Hear", and performed a series of concerts in different countries. In 2011, Yeh received the Golden Needle Award at the 33rd RTHK Top Ten Chinese Gold Song Music Award Ceremony. Yeh has also collaborated on a number of soundtracks (mostly for Tsui Hark's films with scores by Wong Jim), including "Lai Ming But Yiu Loi" from A Chinese Ghost Story (1987), which won the Best Original Song award at the 7th Hong Kong Film Awards.

== Image and artistry ==
Yeh was one of the earliest Overseas Chinese celebrities to enter the entertainment industry in China during the 1980s and one of the few from an English-speaking country. She was also one of the earliest Mandarin speaking celebrities to enter the Hong Kong entertainment industry. In doing so, she paved a way for future divas such as Faye Wong, whom she collaborated with occasionally in her prime.

== Personal life ==
On 17 July 1996, Yeh married Hong Kong pop star and composer-producer George Lam. She is stepmother to his two children.

== Discography ==
- 1980: 春天的浮雕 Embossing Spring
- 1981: 愛的詩篇 Love Poem
- 1982: 愛的出發點 The Beginning of Love
- 1982: 答應我 Promise Me
- 1983: 再好的離別也會思念 (國/英)
- 1984: 葉蒨文 Sally (Cantonese/English)
- 1985: 長夜 My Love Goodnight (Cantonese), includes 200度 200 Degrees (cover of Madonna's Material Girl)
- 1986: Cha Cha Cha (Cantonese/Mandarin)
- 1987: 甜言密語 Sweet Words (Cantonese), includes 乾一杯 Cheers (林子祥 合) (cover of The Checkers' Song For U.S.A.) and 衝動 Impulse (cover of Madonna's True Blue)
- 1987: 祝福 Blessing (Cantonese)
- 1989: 面對面 Face To Face (Cantonese)
- 1990: 珍重 (Cantonese)
- 1990: 秋去秋來 Fall Has Come and Gone (Cantonese)
- 1991: 關懷 (Cantonese), includes 信自己 Believe Myself (cover of Janet Jackson's Love Will Never Do (Without You) (杜德偉 合) and 無盡暖柔情 "Endless Warmth and Tenderness" (cover of Jose Mari Chan's "Please Be Careful with My Heart" (duet with Regine Velasquez) (雷有曜 合)
- 1991: 瀟灑走一回 Cool Walk (國/英)
- 1992: 紅塵 Red Ashes (Cantonese / English)
- 1992 真心真意過一生 (Mandarin), includes 不了情 Endless Love
- 1993: 與你又過一天 Another Day With You (Cantonese/Mandarin), includes 走火入魔 (Cover of Whitney Houston's Queen of the Night)
- 1993: 明月心 Moon's Heart
- 1994: 女人的弱點 A Woman's Weakness (Cantonese cover of Chage and Aska's "You are Free")
- 1994: 離開情人的日子 The Day Lovers Split (Cover of Chage and Aska's "You are Free")
- 1995: Simple Black & White (Cantonese), includes 深呼吸 Deep Breath (Cover of Toni Braxton's Breathe Again)
- 1995: 真心 True Hearted
- 1996: True (Cantonese)
- 1996: 燭光 Candlelight
- 1997: 蒨意 (Cantonese)
- 1997: 關心 Concern (Cantonese)
- 1998: 繫我心弦 My Heart Will Go On (Cantonese cover of Celine Dion's song of the same name)
- 2002: 你聽到 You Heard
- 2003: 出口 Inside Out

== Filmography ==
- Honest Little Ma 一根火柴 (1980)
- Marianna 賓妹 (a.k.a. 你要活著回去) (1982)
- Crimson Street 殺人愛情街 (1982)
- Golden Queen Commando (a.k.a. Amazon Commando / Jackie Chan's Crime Force / Sexy Commando) 紅粉兵團 (1982)
- Pink Force Commando (Sequel to Golden Queens Commando) 紅粉游俠 (a.k.a. 烈血長天) (1982)
- A Flower in the Storm (a.k.a. Falling in the Rain Flowers) 飄零雨中花 (1983)
- A Certain Romance 少女日記 (1984)
- Funny Face (cameo) 醜小鴨 (1984)
- Shanghai Blues 上海之夜 (1984)
- The Occupant (a.k.a. The Tenant) 靈氣迫人 (1984)
- Teppanyaki (a.k.a. New Mr. Boo, Teppanyaki / Mr. Boo 6) 鐵板燒 (1984)
- Seven Foxes X陷阱 (1984)
- Mob Busters 惡漢笑擊隊 (a.k.a.情報販子) (1985)
- Cupid One 愛神一號 (1985)
- Just For Fun 空心少爺 (1985)
- The Protector 威龍猛探 (1985) (Hong Kong version)
- Welcome 補鑊英雄 (1985)
- Aces Go Places 4 (a.k.a. Mad Mission IV / You Never Die Twice) 最佳拍擋IV之千里救差婆 (1986)
- Peking Opera Blues 刀馬旦 (1986)
- The Laser Man (1988)
- The Diary of a Big Man 大丈夫日記 (1988)
- I Love Maria (a.k.a. RoboForce) 鐵甲無敵瑪利亞 (1988)
- The Killer 喋血雙雄 (1989)
- Swordsman (Uncredited / She had to leave this troubled production before filming completed, but a couple shots of her remain in the film, her role was filled by Sharla Cheung Man) 笑傲江湖 (1990)
- The Banquet (cameo) 豪門夜宴 (1991)
- Sisters of the World Unite 莎莎嘉嘉站起來 (1991)
- Love Under the Sun (2003)

== See also ==
- Cantopop
- Cinema of Hong Kong
