= Joey Wong =

Taiwanese–Hong Kong actress and recording artist

- 王祖賢
- Born: 31 January 1967 (age 59); Taipei, Taiwan
- Other names: Joey Wang; Joey Ong Jyo Han/Hen (Taiwanese), Wang Tsu Hsien
- Education: Guoguang Arts School
- Occupations: Actress; Singer
- Years active: 1983–2005
- Height: 1.73 m (5 ft 8 in)
- Partner: Chyi Chin (1985-2002)

Chinese name
- Traditional Chinese: 王祖賢
- Simplified Chinese: 王祖贤
Transcriptions
Standard Mandarin
- Hanyu Pinyin: Wáng Zǔxián
Yue: Cantonese
- Jyutping: Wong4 Zou2jin4

Joey Wong Cho-Yee (AKA Joey Wang, Wang Tsu Hsien) (Chinese: 王祖賢, born 31 January 1967) is a Taiwanese former actress and singer who rose to pan-Asian fame for her roles in Hong Kong films, particularly the film series A Chinese Ghost Story (1987–1991). After the film Shanghai Story (2004), she retired to Canada.

== Early life ==
Wong was born on 31 January 1967 and raised in Taipei, where she completed her secondary school. She has an older brother, a younger brother and a sister. Her father was a basketball player who encouraged her to become a professional basketball player. At 14, she shot a TV commercial for sport shoes which drew the attention of a film producer, who cast her in a leading role of the film It'll Be Very Cold by the Lakeside This Year. Her film debut attracted the attention of producer Mona Fong of Shaw Brothers who invited her to Hong Kong, where Wong appeared in the film Let's Make Laugh II, opposite Derek Yee Tung Sing.

== Career ==
Wong's breakthrough came with her role of Nip Siu-sin in Tsui Hark's A Chinese Ghost Story (1987), which established her as a film icon across East Asia, including China, Japan and South Korea. Initially, Hark had wanted Japanese singer-actress Akina Nakamori to star in the film. Due to the language barrier and Nakamori unable to understand the story, she did not accept the invite. May Lo was Hark's second choice but her growing popularity at that time could not fit the filming into her schedule. Wong then approached Hark’s wife, film producer Nansun Shi, for an audition and managed to score an audition with Hark. During the audition, Wong became a perfect fit for Hark's vision and was cast as Nip

In the following years, she starred in numerous films, often playing supernatural or mythical characters such as ghosts or vixens. In 1989, Wong starred in the Japanese television series A Woman From Hong Kong. She made her singing debut in 1992 with the release of a single, Hold You in My Arms Forever, in both Japanese and Mandarin. The following year, she played the White Snake opposite Maggie Cheung's Green Snake in Tsui Hark’s Green Snake (1993), a reimagining of the Legend of the White Snake.

In 1994, largely due to the fatigue of the film industry, Wong announced her intention to retire from acting and largely withdrew from the public eye. She made a brief return in 1997, starring in the Japanese film Peking Genjin (Peking Man) and releasing a companion CD single, Who Are You?. In 1998, she released the extended Japanese CD Angelus and her first and only full-length Mandarin album, Isolation (also known as Isolated From the World). Following the album’s release, she entered semi-retirement but returned to film in 2001 with Peony Pavilion, which she announced as her last film. In 2004, however, she made a return in Shanghai Story to support producer Hsu Feng. She subsequently retired to Vancouver, Canada, where she has led a devout Buddhist life.

In 2024, she opened a moxibustion center in Vancouver. In 2026, she opened a second one in Silicon Valley.

== Personal life ==
Wong had a 15-year-long, on-and-off relationship with Taiwanese singer Chyi Chin between 1985 and 2002. During a period of separation from Chin in the early 1990s, Wong was in a relationship with Hong Kong businessman Peter Lam, who at the time was married to Tse Ling-ling. The affair received significant media attention, compounded by strong opposition from Lam’s parents, who were aligned with Tse and accused Wong of breaking up their family.

== Filmography ==
=== Film ===
Year	Title	Chinese	Role	Notes
1984	Lake Sprite / It Was Cold By the Lakeside	今年湖畔會很冷	Gong Yu Ping	
1985	How to Choose a Royal Bride	天官賜福	Nalan Qiong Yao	
1985	Working Class	打工皇帝	Amy	
1985	Let's Make a Laugh II	再見七日情	Joey	
1986	The Ghost Snatchers	俾鬼捉	Hsueh	
1986	Last Song in Paris	偶然	Julia	
1986	Walking Beside Me	心動	Joey Ling	
1986	A Hearty Response	義蓋雲天	Kwong Sun	
1986	100 Ways to Murder Your Wife	殺妻二人組	Wang Hsiao Hsien	
1986	Where's Officer Tuba?	霹靂大喇叭	Joanne	
1987	To Err Is Humane	標錯參	Jo Chou	
1987	Private Life	香港小姐寫真	Sam Lee Shing-Pui	a.k.a. Miss Hong Kong
1987	Pretty Girl / Flower Love / Flowerly Love	紅粉情佳人	Lin Yun Fung	
1987	A Chinese Ghost Story	倩女幽魂	Lip Siu Sin	Nominated Hong Kong Film Award for Best Actress
1987	The Legend of Wisely	衛斯理傳奇	Sue Pak	a.k.a. Legend of the Golden Pearl
1988	Law or Justice?	法中情	Joey Ling	
1988	My Dream Is Yours	夢過界	Yik Man Sing	
1988	The Big Heat	城巿特警	Nurse Ada	
1988	The Diary of a Big Man	大丈夫日記	Joey	
1988	Fractured Follies	長短腳之戀	May Yau	
1988	Carry On Hotel	金裝大酒店	Sunflower	
1988	Picture of a Nymph	畫中仙	Mo Chiu	
1989	Deception	驚魂記	Queenie / Catherine	a.k.a. Web of Deception
1989	God of Gamblers	賭神	Jane	
1989	Mr. Coconut	合家歡	Ling	
1989	My Heart is That Eternal Rose	殺手蝴蝶夢	Lap	
1989	Spirit Love	飛越陰陽界	Ginny / Ah Fun	
1989	The Reincarnation of Golden Lotus	潘金蓮之前世今生	Lotus	
1989	Missing Man	都市獵人	Rebecca / Yat	
1989	Gift from Heaven	打工狂想曲	Angie	
1990	Spy Games	中日南北和	Inspector Wong	
1990	Demoness from Thousand Years	千年女妖	Yun Yuk Yi	
1990	An Eye for an Eye	唯我獨尊	Wong Fung Yee	
1990	Ming Ghost	阿嬰	Ying	
1990	Kung Fu VS Acrobatic	摩登如來神掌	Princess Yun Lo	a.k.a. Modern Buddha's Palm
1990	A Tale from the East	漫畫奇俠	Chu Kor Yee	
1990	The Big Score	絕橋智多星	Penny Shang	
1990	Family Honor	無名家族	Hor Yee	
1990	Point of No Return	都市煞星	Julie Kao	
1990	Killer's Romance	浪漫殺手自由人	Paula	
1990	The Cyprus Tigers	東方老虎	Joey	
1990	A Chinese Ghost Story II	倩女幽魂II人間道	Windy Fu Ching Fung	
1991	Hong Kong Godfather	衝擊天子門生	Mrs Leung Chun Bong	
1991	A Chinese Ghost Story III	倩女幽魂III 道道道	Lotus	Won Catalonian International Film Festival for Best Actress
1991	Lady Wolf	狼女		
1991	Fox Legend	靈狐	Suet Gei	a.k.a. Foxy Spirits
1991	Fantasy Romance	魔畫情	Ching	
1991	The Banquet	豪門夜宴	Jacky's wife	
1991	Red and Black	鬼幹部	Shan	
1991	A Chinese Legend	追日	Ku Moon Cher	
1991	An Eternal Combat	天地玄門	Gigi Wong Yi San	
1992	Casino Tycoon	賭城大亨之新哥傳奇	Vivian Cheng Le Erh	
1992	Casino Tycoon II	賭城大亨II之至尊無敵	Vivian Cheng Le Erh	Guest star
1992	Painted Skin	畫皮之陰陽法王	Yau Fung	
1992	The Prince of Temple Street	廟街十二少	Teresa	
1993	Butterfly and Sword	新流星蝴蝶劍	Butterfly	
1993	The Beheaded 1000	千人斬	Blood Lotus	
1993	The Eagle Shooting Heroes	射鵰英雄傳之東成西就	Suqiu	
1993	City Hunter	城市獵人	Carrie / Kaori	
1993	Green Snake	青蛇	White Snake	
1993	Chez n' Ham Story	芝士火腿	Joey Chan	
1993	The East Is Red	東方不敗─風雲再起	Cici / Snow	
1993	All Men Are Brothers	水滸傳之英雄本色	Lin Chung's wife	
1997	Peking Man	北京猿人	Hao Yan	
2001	Peony Pavilion	遊園驚夢	Rong Lan	Nominated Golden Bauhinia Awards for Best Actress
2004	Shanghai Story	美麗上海	May	

=== Television ===
Year	Title	Notes
1998	世纪末之诗	Japanese television series

== Discography ==
=== Singles ===
Title	Release date
永遠に抱きしめて	11 March 1992
Who are you?	3 December 1997

== Awards and nominations ==
Year	Award	Nominated work	Category	Result
1987	Hong Kong Film Awards	A Chinese Ghost Story	Best Actress	Nominated
1992	Catalonian International Film Festival	A Chinese Ghost Story III	Best Actress	Won
2002	Golden Bauhinia Awards	Peony Pavilion	Best Actress	Nominated
