= David Wu (Hong Kong actor) =

Hong Kong-Canadian filmmaker

David Wu Tai Wai (Chinese: 胡大為; born 31 July 1952) is a Hong Kong-Canadian editor, director, and actor of film and television, known for his collaborations with directors John Woo and Ronnie Yu. He is also the editor of several international cult classics such as A Chinese Ghost Story (1987), Hard Boiled (1992), Bride of Chucky (1998), and Brotherhood of the Wolf (2001).

He has been nominated 12 times for the Hong Kong Film Award for Best Editing, winning twice for Hard Boiled and The Crossing (2014). He has also been nominated for several Directors Guild of Canada and Leo Awards.

== Life and career ==
Wu was born on 31 July 1952. While studying graphic design at Hong Kong Polytechnic, he got a job in 1970 as a film editing apprentice at Shaw Brothers. The first editing credit he officially received was for The Spiritual Boxer (1975). He then moved to editing for TVB, where he also acted in several television dramas from 1976 to 1979.

Wu directed the mini-series Iron Road (2009), a Chinese-Canadian co-production about Chinese workers building the Canadian Pacific Railway.

== Selected filmography ==
=== Actor ===
- The Buddhist Fist 佛掌羅漢拳 (1980) as Sheriff
- Bitter Taste of Blood 亡命天涯 (1987)
- A Chinese Ghost Story 倩女幽魂 (1987)
- Fatal Love 殺之戀 (1988)
- I Love Maria (1988) as Vice Captain
- Mother Vs Mother 南北媽打 (1988)
- Sunshine Friends 笑星撞地球 (1990)
- Doctor Vampire 僵屍醫生 (1990)
- Once a Thief 縱橫四海 (1991)
- Twin Dragons 雙龍會 (1992)
- C'est La Vie, Mon Cheri 新不了情 (1993)
- Flying Dagger 神經刀與飛天貓 (1993)
- Killer's Love 兩廂情願 (1993)
- Master Wong VS Master Wong 黃飛鴻對黃飛鴻 (1993)
- A Roof with a View 天台的月光 (1993)
- Shadow Cop 神探乾濕褸 (1993)

=== Director ===
- The Bride with White Hair 2 白髮魔女2 (1993)
- Snow Queen 冰雪女王 (2002)
- Plague City: SARS in Toronto (2005)
- Merlin's Apprentice 聖杯傳說 (2006)
- Cold Steel (2011) (Chinese: 遍地狼煙 pinyin: Biandi Lang Yan)
