= Walk on Fire (film) =

1988 Hong Kong film by Norman Law

- DVD cover
- Traditional Chinese: 獵鷹計劃
- Simplified Chinese: 猎鹰计划
- Hanyu Pinyin: Liè Yīng Jì Huá
- Jyutping: Lip6 Jing1 Gai3 Waak6
- Directed by: Norman Law
- Screenplay by: Wong Kar-wai
- Produced by: Ng See-yuen
- Starring: Andy Lau; Cherie Chung; Kent Cheng; Ray Lui; Dick Wei
- Cinematography: Horace Wong
- Edited by: Poon Hung
- Music by: Tang Siu-lam
- Production company: Seasonal Films
- Distributed by: Seasonal Films
- Release date: 24 June 1988
- Running time: 104 minutes
- Country: Hong Kong
- Language: Cantonese
- Box office: HK$12,936,236

Walk on Fire is a 1988 Hong Kong action film starring Andy Lau and Cherie Chung. It is directed by Norman Law.

== Plot ==
In Macau, criminal Tong Heung-tung of the Hunan Gang, who bombed the Hong Kong police headquarters, was being send back to Hong Kong by Kowloon OCTB inspectors Lee Ho-lung and Lo Mo. During the process, the police van was ambushed by the Hunan Gang who helped Tong escape. Lee chased the gang all the way past the Mainland border and arrested them causing mass destruction which maddened his superior officer Chan.

Complaints Against Police Unit inspector Lau Kwok-wah is Lee's good friend. During one night while Lau, Lo Mo, Lee, his wife and daughters were dining, Lee's informant Miss Chung came for help. Leader of the Hunan Gang, Wai, used Chung to lure Lee out to seek revenge for his brothers. When Lee made it to Chung's house, he fought with Wai's henchmen before being knocked out by Wai. Chung was also knocked and pretended to be unconscious and heard everything the gang said. After she got up, she left her house but the gang chased her and she mistakenly thought that she killed one of the henchmen. Wai and his gang brought Lee to the pier and brutally beat him before making him drunk and having him drive himself into the ocean, killing him.

The next morning, Lee's wife, May, gave birth to a baby boy and was saddened when she heard of her husband's death. When she retrieved Lee's belongings at the police station, Lau told Chan that Lee's death was suspicious which Chan refused to believe. Lau and Lo Mo decided to investigate Lee's death and first, tries to find Lee's informant, Chung. They saw Chung crashing out of a nightclub and was harassed by narcotic officers before Lau went to the rescue. Lau and Lo Mo took Chung to a restaurant where Chung escaped. Just as expected by the two, she went to her grandmother's house where the Hunan Gang attempted to kill them by burning the house. Lau and Lo Mo came to rescue them. Lau took Chung to the police station where she told Chan that she saw Wai and his gang taking Lee, which Chan still refused to believe. Chan had his own inefficient ways to arrest the Hunan Gang and refused to let Lau interfere.

Angered, Lau decided to take this case in his own hands. Lau also allowed Chung to stay in his house since she had nowhere to stay. There, Chung agreed to help Lau find the head of the Hunan Gang, Squid Chiu, when he jokingly threatened her that he would use her as bait to catch the Hunan Gang. Chung took Lau to see a low-life Triad member, Al, to help them get Squid Chiu to cooperate with Lau. When Al refused, Lau revealed that he had used Al's name to call Chiu and would either frame him for drug possession or that he had betrayed Chiu. Al agreed to help when Chiu arrived and told him about Lau, posing as the son of a jewelry store owner, wanting him to rob his store. Afterwards, Lau rewarded Al with what Al thought was heroin but was actually laundry detergent.

When Chiu wanted to take a look at Lau's jewelry store, Lau asked Lo Mo for help to have his future father-in-law lend him his store. Lo Mo's girlfriend told them that her father would not be at the store if a girl could take him out. They thought of a plan to have Chung to go out with him.

Chung, who was addicted to drugs, had two heroin-laced cigarettes in her purse. Lau however threw these cigarettes down the toilet before leaving with her and encountered a traffic jam. As a result, they ran and made it to the store just on time. When Chung's addiction came while at the store, Lo Mo quickly got some methadone for her before she proceeded to leave with Lo Mo's father-in-law and Chiu arrived right after.

At home, Lau scolded Chung telling her that she almost foiled his plan and to stop using drugs while Chung blamed him for throwing her cigarettes away. At night, Chung cried and told Lau that it was not easy to quit drugs with no support. Lau then promised Chung that after avenging Lee, he would take her to a quiet place in Lantau Island and help her quit it.

The next day, Lau gave a call to Chiu, who wanted HK$200,000 before staging the robbery. Lo Mo went to Chan for help, who refused to do so. When Chung told them that a Taiwanese drug dealer was coming to Hong Kong the next day, Lau thought of a plan to rob him. At first, the timid Lo Mo refused to join before Lau told him that Lee treated him as a best friend and advised him to do it for avenging his friend, to which Lo Mo finally agreed to help.

At the airport, Lau disguised with a mustache and sunglasses kidnapped the drug dealer when Lo Mo and Chung came to pick them up with a van and drove away while being chased by the police. While Lau was forcing the drug dealer out of the car, Lo Mo accidentally revealed that they were police officers. They finally got his money and left while the police were firing at them.

At the OCTB headquarters, Chan told his subordinates that yesterday, Interpol Agent Chan Kwok-chiu, who was working undercover as the Taiwanese drug dealer, was robbed and suspected it was done by the police. The Interpol agent described one of them as an overweight man of 200 pounds and every 200-pound police officer in Hong Kong would be going to the Interpol headquarters for identification. Lo Mo told Lau and Chung about this and tried have him lose 10 pounds in one day by working out all day but obviously failed to do so. Later they suggested that him to speak Cantonese with a false Chiuchow accent.

At the Interpol headquarters, Lo Mo successfully tricked the police by faking the accent before he was caught speaking accurate Cantonese. They called him in once again for identification before he was freed to go although they were suspicious of him.

Later, Lau brought the HK$200,000 to Chiu. At night, while Lau was typing a report on the case, Chung came out and asked him why he was not sleeping yet. Lau then gave Chung a large sum of money, telling her to go to Lantau Island alone if the case was going to go on longer. She refused the money and they later go to a bar and had a drink where Chung sang a song to Lau, expressing her love to him and they later kissed outside.

The next day, Lau brought Chung to the harbour to send her off to Lantau Island. Then Lo Mo came and drove Lau to the store where he would observe the robbers. Lau told Lo Mo to inform Chan about the robbery before 12:30PM. Lo Mo attempted to tell Chan about this but he was at a meeting. While Lau was inside his car, two beat cops thought he was parking illegally before he revealed his identity to them and told them to leave. When Chan's meeting was finally over, Interpol Superintendent Lai wanted to arrest Lo Mo while he was still talking to Chan. Lo Mo asked him to listen before having him arrested. Outside the jewelry store, Chung took a taxi back and wanted to help Lau. There, the Hunan Gang, led by Wai, arrived. Chung told Lau that Wai captured Lee at the night of his death. The Hunan Gang then proceeded to rob the store but the police has not arrive yet. Lau asked the two beat cops for help. Later, a big chase and gunfight occurred where Lau killed several gang members and Wai killed one of the beat cops. Lau and the other beat cop chased Wai and two gang members as Chung followed taking the gun of the dead beat cop and during the process, Lau killed another gang member. Later, they end up at the top of a building where Lau shot another gang member and Wai killed the other beat cop. As they were shooting at each other, they ran out of bullets after each making a shot. Then they fought to get the dead beat cop's gun where Wai triumphed and Chung arrived holding a gun behind Wai. However, the gang member that Lau shot came back up attempting to attack Chung when she turned around and shot him while at the same time Wai shot her as well. Lau and Wai were engaged in a fight when the police arrived at the store. Lau delivered a final kick to Wai before Lo Mo and the police arrived. When the police arrest him, Wai took a gun from a policeman and killed him while Lau took Lo Mo's gun and shot Wai multiple times, killing him. Lau later went to see Chung, who was fatally wounded. Chung told Lau that no one had cared for her as much as he had and she could not quit drugs without him. She then died in Lau's arms. Afterwards, Lau and Lo Mo were arrested for robbing Chan Kwok-chiu at the airport.

== Cast ==
- Andy Lau as Lau Kwok-wah
- Cherie Chung as Miss Chung
- Kent Cheng as Lo Mo (Tang)
- Ray Lui as Inspector Lee Ho-lung
- Dick Wei as Wai
- Lau Siu-ming as Chan Sir
- Kam Hing-yin as Interpol Superintendent Lai
- Maria Cordero as Narcotic officer
- Shum Wai as Squid Chiu
- May Ho as May
- Yung Wai-man as Mother's girlfriend
- Teddy Yip as Mr. Chan
- Ng Hong-sang as Wai's thug
- Tony Leung as policeman
- Lo Wing
- Jeffrey Ho
- Chan Chik-wai as Narcotic officer
- Charlie Chan
- Lam Kai-wing as thug
- Bruce Law as Wai's thug
- Hung San-nam as Chan Kwok-chiu
- Barry Wong
- Cheung Miu-hau as Al
- Lo Yuen-ming
- Sing Chiu-kwong
- Hak Chai

== Theme song ==
- "Nobody Is Willing to Love Me" (無人願愛我)
  - Composer: Tokiko Kato
  - Lyricist: Keith Chan
  - Singer: Anita Mui

== Box office ==
The film grossed HK$12,936,236 at the Hong Kong box office during its theatrical run from 24 June to 14 July 1988 in Hong Kong.
