= Wu Ma =

Hong Kong actor and film director

- 午馬
- Born: Fung Wang-yuen; 22 September 1942; Tianjin, China
- Died: 4 February 2014 (aged 71); Hong Kong
- Other name: Ng Ma
- Occupations: Actor; film director; producer; screenwriter
- Years active: 1964–2014
- Height: 1.68 m (5 ft 6 in)
- Spouse: Ma Yan (m. 1995)
- Partner: Agassi Wang (former)
- Children: 1 daughter
- Awards: Golden Horse Awards – Best Supporting Actor; 1987 A Chinese Ghost Story

Chinese name
- Traditional Chinese: 午馬
- Simplified Chinese: 午马
Transcriptions
Standard Mandarin
- Hanyu Pinyin: Wǔ Mǎ
Yue: Cantonese
- Jyutping: Ng5 Maa5

Fung Wang-yuen
- Traditional Chinese: 馮宏源
- Simplified Chinese: 冯宏源
Transcriptions
Standard Mandarin
- Hanyu Pinyin: Féng Hóngyuán
Yue: Cantonese
- Jyutping: Fung4 Wang4jyun4

Fung Wang-yuen (Chinese: 馮宏源; 22 September 1942 – 4 February 2014), better known by his stage name Wu Ma (午馬), was a Hong Kong actor and filmmaker. He made his screen debut in 1963, and with over 240 appearances to his name (plus 49 directorial credits within a 50-year period).

During his lifetime, he was considered one of the most familiar faces in the history of Hong Kong cinema, and was widely known for his portrayal of Taoist ghosthunter Yan Chixia in A Chinese Ghost Story. He was a four-time Hong Kong Film Award nominee, three for Best Supporting Actor and one for Best Director, and a Golden Horse Award winner.

== Early years ==
Wu was born Fung Wang-yuen in Tianjin, China. At 16 he moved to Guangzhou and became a machinist before migrating to Hong Kong in 1960. In 1962, Feng enrolled in the Shaw Brothers acting course. Graduating a year later, he became a contract player for the studio and made his first appearance in Lady General Hua Mu-lan. He then appeared in such films as Temple of the Red Lotus (1965), The Knight of Knights (1966) and Trail of the Broken Blade (1967). He took on the stage name 'Wu Ma' as it reflected the animal in the year of his birth (the horse), and believed it was short enough for audiences to remember.

During an interview, Wu explained that he had stumbled upon directing when he was offered an unexpected trip to Japan for a movie. The film's original assistant director was unable to clear his visa in time, and Wu was called upon to take his place. After the experience, Wu decided to become a director.

== Career ==
=== 1970s ===
In 1970, Wu became a director in his own right. His directorial debut, Wrath of the Sword, was released the same year. In 1971, Wu released one of his seminal works, The Deaf and Mute Heroine. He concentrated on directing in the 1970s, directing several movies – such as The Young Tiger (1973) and Wits to Wits (1974). Wits to Wits has been noted as one of the precursors of the knockabout comedy kung fu genre that was later made famous by Sammo Hung and Jackie Chan. Another movie Wu directed, Manchu Boxer (1974), featured Sammo Hung, then a young choreographer and later one of the trend-setters of Hong Kong cinema. This marked the beginning of a strong working relationship between the two, which would become prominent towards the 1980s. He co-directed with his former mentor Chang in several movies – The Water Margin (1972), The Pirate (1973), All Men Are Brothers (1975) and The Naval Commandos (1977).

While most of his output during this period was as a director, Wu continued to appear as an actor and appeared both in his own movies and in several others, although his roles were generally limited to small appearances. During the mid-1970s, Wu joined a small exodus who were leaving Shaw Brothers due to corruption within the studio and became an independent director. Despite becoming an independent director, Wu was still able to work closely with some Shaw Brothers stars such as Ti Lung.

=== 1980s ===
As the 1970s and the era of the martial arts film mania slowed down albeit very slightly, Wu Ma's output as a director also slowed. His acting output, however, increased as he became increasingly well known as a popular character actor. Wu had made appearances in Sammo Hung's 1970s movies (such as The Iron-Fisted Monk), his association with Hung began in earnest in the early 1980s. Wu appeared in Encounters of the Spooky Kind (1980). Throughout the 1980s, Wu and Hung had a close working relationship, often with Wu as the director and Hung as the producer (such as My Cousin The Ghost (1986)). Wu worked in Hung's production company Bo Ho as the production manager, and made appearances in Hung-directed films during the 1980s, including Millionaire's Express (1986) and Wheels on Meals (1984).

Towards the mid-1980s, Wu became one of the most prolific character actors in Hong Kong, his now-rubbery face able to shift effortlessly across a spectrum of emotions. During the 1980s, he received three Hong Kong Film Award nominations for Best Supporting Actor – for Righting Wrongs (1986), where he played a policeman having to deal with his son's death; the classic A Chinese Ghost Story (1987) as Yin Chek-Ha, which is considered one of the greatest films ever made; and in The Last Eunuch in China (1988), as Lord Ting. He began a working relationship with Tsui Hark, and appeared in several of Hark's movies. Aside from A Chinese Ghost Story, Wu also appeared in the earlier classic Peking Opera Blues (1986).

After A Chinese Ghost Story, said by Wu to be among his most favorite movies, Wu began to focus on the supernatural genre. Much of his directorial efforts after 1987 were within that genre, such as Picture of a Nymph look alike mini sequel from Chinese Ghost Story directed by Eric Tsang (1988), Burning Sensation (1989) and Fox Legend (1991). He also co-directed Just Heroes (1989) with John Woo.

=== 1990s ===
Wu continued his working relationship with Hark, and appeared in Once Upon a Time in China (1991) and The Swordsman (1991). The early 1990s were an especially prolific period in Wu's career – with Wu appearing in over 14 movies during one year. As the Hong Kong film industry began to slump, Wu's career also slowed considerably. After appearing in High Risk (1995), many of his appearances were either in low-budget movies or in television series.

== Personal life ==
Wu Ma had a relationship with actress Agassi Wang (王玉環) from the mid-1980s to early 1990s.

In 1995, Wu went to Shenzhen to film and met a real estate agent Ma Yan (馬艷), who was 23 years younger than him. After their marriage, she became his agent. They have one daughter.

=== Death ===
Wu was diagnosed with lung cancer and it was announced that the disease started to spread in 2013. His wife stated that "He had enjoyed every precious minute with his family, which explained that he had casually walked his path with pride and dignity." He died peacefully at his home in Hong Kong on 4 February 2014 at the age of 71.

== Filmography ==
=== Films ===
Year	English title	Chinese title	Role as actor	Function	Notes
1965	Temple of the Red Lotus				
1969	Return of the One-Armed Swordsman	獨臂刀			
1971	The Deaf and Mute Heroine			Director	
1972	The Water Margin	水滸傳			
1974	Wits to Wits			Director	a.k.a. From China With Death a.k.a. Conman and the Kung Fu Kid
1977	The Iron-Fisted Monk	三德和尚与舂米六	Boatman in brothel		
1978	The Massive				
1978	Showdown at the Cotton Mill			Director	
1978	Half a Loaf of Kung Fu	一招半式闖江湖	Urinating man		
1980	The Heroes			Co-director	
1980	By Hook or by Crook				
1980	Encounters of the Spooky Kind	鬼打鬼			
1981	Prodigal Son	敗家仔	Iron Palm		
1982	The Dead and the Deadly	人嚇人	Ma Lun Cheung	Director	Nominated – Hong Kong Film Award for Best Director
1983	Project A	A計劃	Mahjong cheat		
1984	Wheels on Meals	快餐車	Mental patient		
1984	Hong Kong 1941	等待黎明	Liu Yan-mau		
1984	Hocus Pocus	人嚇鬼		Production manager	
1984	Pom Pom	神勇雙響炮	Police station employee		
1985	Twinkle, Twinkle Lucky Stars	夏日福星	Witch-doctor		
1985	Mr Vampire	殭屍先生	Rice shop boss		
1986	Peking Opera Blues	刀馬旦	Mr. Wong		
1986	Righting Wrongs	執法先鋒	Uncle Tsai		Nominated – Hong Kong Film Award for Best Supporting Actor
1986	Millionaire's Express	富貴列車	Security officer / convict / bank robber		
1987	A Chinese Ghost Story	倩女幽魂	Yin Chek Hsia		Nominated – Hong Kong Film Award for Best Supporting Actor; Won Golden Horse Award for Best Supporting Actor
1987	Scared Stiff				
1988	Mr Vampire IV				
1988	Picture of a Nymph				
1988	Last Eunuch in China	中國最後一個太監	Lord Ting, the head eunuch		Nominated – Hong Kong Film Award for Best Supporting Actor
1988	Police Story 2	警察故事續集	Shopping Center Security Guard		
1989	Miracles	奇蹟	Uncle Hoi		
1989	Just Heroes	義膽群英	Ma	Also co-director	
1990	Magic Cop	驅魔警察	Ma		
1990	A Chinese Ghost Story II	倩女幽魂II：人間道	Yin Chek Hsia		
1990	Story of Kennedy Town	西環的故事	Detective Sergeant Huang	Also writer and director	
1990	Spooky Family	捉鬼合家歡 II – 麻衣傳奇	Ma Yi ancestor Priest		
1991	The Gambling Ghost				
1991	The Magnificent Scoundrels	情聖	Fatt		
1991	The Swordsman	笑傲江湖	Liu Zhengfeng		
1991	Once Upon a Time in China	黃飛鴻	So		
1992	Painted Skin	畫皮之陰陽法王	Zhang's Senior		
1993	The Buddhist Spell	菩薩戒	Mong Fa Da		
1993	The Sword Stained with Royal Blood	新碧血劍	Suen Chung-Sau		
1994	The Chinese Ghostbuster	鍾馗嫁妹	Zhong Kui, the Older Brother		
1994	Deadful Melody				
1994	Master of Zen	達摩祖師	Shenguang's master		
1995	High Risk	鼠胆龍威	Frankie's father		
1996	Iron Monkey 2	街頭殺手	Jin's father		
2005	House of Fury	精武家庭	Uncle Chiu		
2008	Ticket	車票			
2009	Chongqing Girl				
2010	Here Comes Fortune				
2010	Jeet Kune Do				
2010	14 Blades	錦衣衛	Qiao Yong		
2011	White Vengeance	鴻門宴	Grand Tutor		
2011	I Love Hong Kong				
2011	Legendary Amazons	楊門女將之軍令如山	Imperial Tutor Pang		
2011	What's Under the Bed				
2011	Hand in Hand				
2011	My Own Swordsman				
2012	If I Were You	变身男女			
2012	Common Heroes				
2012	Pen Fairy	畫聖			Won – Shanghai International Film Festival for Best Male Actor
2012	No Retreat				
2012	Moonlight Love				
2012	Decrepit Dream				
2012	The Immemorial Magic				
2013	Mark of Youth				
2013	Don't Talk about High – Rich and Handsome				
2013	A Funny Wedding				
2014	Shigeshoshi			Also director	
2014	Fighting				
2014	A Stupid Journey				
2015	Love Will Be Back	等爱归来			
2016	Ya Hai Er	哑孩儿			

=== Television ===
Year	English title	Chinese title	Role	Notes
2003	Diao Man Gong Zhu Xiao Yao Wang	刁蠻公主逍遙王	Tie Wencheng	
2005	Lost City in Snow Heaven	雪域迷城	Yang An	
2007	The Legend and the Hero	封神榜之鳳鳴岐山	Shang Rong	
2007	Sword Stained with Royal Blood	碧血劍	Wen Fangda	
2008	When East Meets West	東邊西邊		
2008	Taste of Happiness	幸福的味道	Mei Lan's grandfather	
2008	The Qin Empire	大秦帝國	Baili Yao	
2008	Bing Sheng	兵聖	Yan Ying	
2010	Journey to the West	西遊記	Elder Jinchi	
2012	Cong Ming De Kong Kong	聪明小空空	Monk of Black Mountain	

== See also ==
- Chang Cheh
- Sammo Hung
- Lam Ching-ying
