= Tales from the Dark 1 =

2013 Hong Kong film by Simon Yam, Lee Chi-ngai and Fruit Chan

- Theatrical release poster
- Directed by: Simon Yam; Lee Chi-ngai; Fruit Chan
- Screenplay by: Lilian Lee; Lee Chi-ngai; Fruit Chan
- Story by: Lilian Lee
- Produced by: Mathew Tang; Bill Kong
- Starring: Tony Leung; Kelly Chen; Simon Yam; Siu Yam-yam
- Cinematography: Jason Kwan; Wade Muller; Lam Wah-chuen
- Edited by: Kwong Chi-leung; Lee Kar-wing; Lee Chi-ngai; Fruit Chan
- Music by: Kenji Kawai
- Production companies: Edko Films; Movie Addict Productions
- Distributed by: Edko Films
- Release dates: 28 June 2013 (New York Asian Film Festival); 11 July 2013 (Hong Kong)
- Running time: 112 minutes
- Country: Hong Kong
- Language: Cantonese
- Box office: HK$7,677,402

Tales from the Dark 1 (Chinese: 李碧華鬼魅系列: 迷離夜; lit. 'Li Bihua's Ghost Series: Mysterious Night') is a 2013 Hong Kong horror anthology film directed by Simon Yam, Lee Chi-ngai, and Fruit Chan. The film is split into three segments, each based on a short story by Lilian Lee. The first part, titled Stolen Goods (贓物), starred Simon Yam as a jobless man who steals funerary urns and forces the dead's relatives to pay him to get back the urns. The second part, titled A Word in the Palm (放手), starred Tony Leung Ka-fai as a fortune-teller who teams up with his neighbour (Kelly Chen) to help the ghost of a schoolgirl (Cherry Ngan). The final part, titled Jing Zhe (驚蟄), starred Susan Shaw as a "villain-hitter" who is approached by a woman (Dada Chan) to curse four people.

The first segment also marked the directorial debut of actor Simon Yam. The film was shown at the New York Asian Film Festival on 28 June 2013 and released theatrically in Hong Kong on 11 July 2013. It was followed by Tales from the Dark 2, which was released four weeks later on 8 August 2013.

== Plot ==
Stolen Goods

Kwan, an odd-job worker who lives in a "coffin home", gets fired from his job as a restaurant assistant. Out of desperation to pay rent, he breaks into a columbarium at night and randomly steals funerary urns, leaving behind ransom notes for the relatives to contact and pay him to get back the urns. On one occasion, he successfully collects ransom from the cousin of one of his "victims", who turns out to be the ghost of the "victim" himself. The money he received also turns into hell banknotes. Shocked, Kwan tries to burn the hell banknotes but the fire gets out of control and he burns himself to death.

A Word in the Palm

Ho, a fortune-teller who can see ghosts, is retiring from his trade to spend more time with his wife and son. His last clients are Cheung, a swimming coach, and Cheung's pregnant wife, who claims she is being haunted by a ghost. Ho teams up with his neighbour Lan, a crystal seller and fellow fortune-teller, to unravel the mystery. It turns out that Cheung had an affair with his student, Chan Siu-ting, and made her pregnant. After Cheung scorned her, Chan drowned herself at sea and became a vengeful ghost. Ho and Lan manage to convince Chan's ghost to give up her desire for revenge and find peace in the afterlife. Ho later learns that his son has inherited his ability to see ghosts.

Jing Zhe

Chu is a "villain-hitter" who chants curses and hits paper effigies of people for a fee during the jing zhe period. Her customers come to her with the names, photographs, personal belongings, etc. of people they want to curse. She meets all sorts of customers, including a wealthy woman who has a grudge against her daughter-in-law and others, and a man with a similar-sounding name as the Hong Kong Chief Executive's. Her last customer, a young woman, says she wants three men and a woman cursed and she wants to do the hitting herself. Chu soon realises that she is the ghost of a woman raped and murdered by three men, of whom one is Chu's son. That day, Chu had witnessed her son and his two accomplices kidnapping the woman into a car but had turned a deaf ear to the woman's cries for help. The four of them meet their ends as the hitting intensifies.

== Cast ==
Stolen Goods

- Simon Yam as Kwan Fu-keung
- Yuen Qiu as the restaurant owner
- Felix Lok as Chu Wing-kit
- Maggie Shiu as Kwok Wing-nei
- Lam Suet as the eating ghost
- Jonathan Wong as a policeman
- Ariel and Audrey Chan as the ghost girls

A Word in the Palm

- Tony Leung Ka-fai as Ho Ho
- Kelly Chen as Lan
- Eileen Tung as Ho's wife
- Cherry Ngan as Chan Siu-ting
- Eddie Li as Cheung Ka-chun
- Jeannie Chan as Cheung's wife

Jing Zhe

- Susan Shaw as Chu
- Josephine Koo as Koo
- Dada Chan as the ghost
- Lo Hoi-pang as Leung Chun-ying
- Sir JBS, Kit Leung and Phat Chan as the three men

== Production and style ==
The film's story was adapted from the second book in Lilian Lee's five-volume book series that were originally published in newspaper form. The film's directors included Fruit Chan and Lee Chi-ngai who have not directed many films in the past decade and Simon Yam who made his directorial debut with this film.

Derek Elley of Film Business Asia described the film as a "portmanteau horror film" and felt it was similar in tone and style to 1980s and early 1990s Hong Kong horror films. The Hollywood Reporter echoed this statement, referring to it as a "film that harkens back to the glory days of Hong Kong horror in the 1980s."

== Release ==
Tales from the Dark 1 was the opening night film at the New York Asian Film Festival on 28 June 2013. It was released theatrically in Hong Kong on 11 July 2013. The film was followed by a sequel titled Tales from the Dark 2, was released four weeks later on 8 August 2013.

== Reception ==
Variety gave the film a mixed review, stating that "this somewhat uneven but engrossing mini-triptych should please fans of Asian horror without necessarily scaring their pants off". The Hollywood Reporter referred to the film as a "mostly engaging film" and that "Anthologies are by definition hit and miss endeavors and often swing wildly in quality from one segment to the next. That’s exactly what happens here, except the producers have wisely managed to bottom load the film so that sitting through the first entry eventually pays off."
