= Chasing the Dragon (disambiguation) =

"Chasing the dragon" refers to inhaling the vapor of a powdered psychoactive drug off a heated sheet of aluminium foil.

Chasing the Dragon may also refer to:

- Chasing the Dragon (film), a 2017 Hong Kong film
  - Chasing the Dragon II: Wild Wild Bunch, its 2019 sequel
- "Chasing the Dragon" (Juliet Bravo), a 1985 British television episode
- "Chasing the Dragon" (Holby City), a 2000 British television episode
- "Chasing the Dragon" (song), by Epica from the 2007 album The Divine Conspiracy
- Chase the Dragon, a 1982 studio album by English rock band Magnum
