= Robo Force =

Robo Force or Roboforce may refer to:

- Robo Force (toy line), created by the Ideal Toy Company in 1984
- Roboforce (film), a 1988 Hong Kong film also known as I Love Maria
- Roboforce, a Lego Space theme introduced in 1997
