= Giselle Lam =

Hong Kong actress and singer (born 1986)

- 林慧倩
- Born: July 2, 1986 (age 40); Hong Kong
- Occupations: Actress; singer; TV host
- Years active: 2011–present

Giselle Lam Wai Sin (Chinese: 林慧倩) is a Hong Kong actress, singer, and host.

== Early life ==
Lam was born in Hong Kong to parents of Indonesian Chinese origin. She graduated with a BA in Media and Communication Studies at the University of Western Australia.

== Career ==
Lam first appeared in a minor role in the 2008 film La Lingerie, and in a bid to increase her profile, she entered the 2011 Miss Hong Kong Pageant. Lam made it to the final six in the pageant.

After participating in the pageant, she mainly worked as an emcee and host for events. She also had minor roles in many Hong Kong and overseas films and TV series, including Cold War, Overheard 2, and Rigor Mortis. In 2017, she joined Taoxing Network Power (2017–2019) and became an artist under the company. In August 2019, She released her first solo single "Flower Bud" (花蕾). The same year, she had a major role as an MMA fighter in the action movie MMA Diva (擊鬥女神). She trained in MMA. Muay Thai and Brazilian Jiu-Jitsu for the role. She later took part in a boxing match in the TV series TVB All Star Games (明星運動會). In 2023, she appeared in the TV drama Legal Affairs (法與情), and in 2024, she had a significant role as a policewoman in I Did It My Way.

In 2024, she participated in the alternative beauty pageant "Beautiful Life Towards 40" hosted by ViuTV, and finally only made it to the top 15.

== Filmography ==
=== Film ===
List of Kit Harrington film credits
| Year | Title | Role | Notes | Ref. |
|---|---|---|---|---|
| 2008 | La Lingerie | Female colleague | | |
| 2011 | Overheard 2 | | | |
| 2011 | Don't Go Breaking My Heart | | | |
| 2012 | Cold War | | | |
| 2012 | Love Is... Pyjamas (男人如衣服) | | | |
| 2012 | Supercapitalist | Model 4 | as Giselle Halim | |
| 2012 | The Shadow of Death | Mandy | as Giselle Halim | |
| 2013 | Rigor Mortis | Siu-Ho's Wife | | |
| 2013 | My Lucky Star | | | |
| 2016 | Cold War 2 | Anchor | | |
| 2016 | PG Love | | | |
| 2016 | The Gigolo 2 | Sushi's friend | | |
| 2018 | Distinction (非同凡響) | Teacher | | |
| 2018 | Rhapsody of Kidnapping (3個綁匪7條心) | Kong's secretary | | |
| 2019 | The Fatal Raid (不義之戰) | Master of Ceremonies | | |
| 2019 | MMA Diva (擊鬥女神) | Yiu Ching Lam | | |
| 2023 | Twilight of the Warriors: Walled In | News anchor | | |
| 2024 | I Did It My Way | Lee Tze Man | | |
| 2025 | Hybrid Storm (棋拳風暴) | Fat Bun's wife | | |
| 2025 | Under Current | | | |

=== Television ===
List of Kit Harrington television credits
| Year | Title | Role | Notes | Ref. |
|---|---|---|---|---|
| 2017 | Psycho Detective (詭探) | Leung Kin Wah's Wife | ViuTV, 1 episode | |
| 2017 | 100 Days Of Love (閃婚100天) | Mandy | Miniseries | |
| 2018 | Celebrity Chef: East vs West | as judge | 1 episode | |
| 2021 | TVB All Star Games (明星運動會) | as herself | Boxing match | |
| 2023 | Legal Affairs (法與情) | Prisoner | ViuTV | |
| 2024 | Expats | Nurse | Amazon Prime series | |
| 2024 | Beautiful Life Towards 40 (美麗40路) | Contestant | Beauty pageant on ViuTV | |
| 2025 | City of Light (光明大押) | Vice-Principal Chan | 1 episode | |
| 2026 | J Sport | as herself | 1 episode | |
