= Farewell My Concubine (novel) =

1985 novel by Lilian Lee

Farewell My Concubine (simplified Chinese: 霸王别姬; traditional Chinese: 霸王別姬; pinyin: Bàwáng Bié Jī; lit. 'The Hegemon-King Bids Farewell to His Concubine') is a 1985 novel by Lilian Lee (Li Bihua). The novel contains scenes not present in the film adaptation and scenes which were altered in the film version. In 1993, Lee published a revised version of Farewell My Concubine after the release of the film.
