= Celebrity Chef: East vs West =

Celebrity Chef: East vs West is a television show produced by Fox Networks Group Asia. The show features Hong Kong singer and chef Nicholas Tse and Canadian chef David Rocco cooking local food in competition with each other. The show was filmed in China, Macau, the Philippines and Malaysia and aired on Fox Life on 25 March 2018.

Episode	Location	Guess Host	Dish	Judges	Score	Total Score After Each Round
1	Macau	Chef David Wong	African Chicken	Chef David Wong Chef David Lai Giselle Lam	Nicholas Tse: 22 David Rocco: 21	Nicholas Tse: 22 David Rocco: 21
2	Shunde, District	Chef Steven Liu	Stuffed Mud Carp	Chef Steven Liu Wu Sufen Lee Zhaoji	Nicholas Tse: 24 David Rocco: 23	Nicholas Tse: 46 David Rocco: 45
3	Manila, Philippines	Chef Bruce Lim	Sinigang	Chef Bruce Lim Chef Bruce Ricketts Maureen Wroblewitz	Nicholas Tse: 22 David Rocco: 24	Nicholas Tse: 68 David Rocco: 68
4	Ipoh, Malaysia	Chef Wan	Rendang Tok	Chef Wan Chef Boon Ili Sulaiman	Nicholas Tse: 24 David Rocco: 23	Nicholas Tse: 92 David Rocco: 91
5	Kuala Lumpur, Malaysia	Bobby Chinn	Nasi Lemak and Bubur Cha Cha	Bobby Chinn Chef Rodolpe Onno Anis Nabilah	Nicholas Tse: 23 David Rocco: 21 40 People Votes Nicholas Tse: 23 votes David Rocco: 17 votes	Final score Nicholas Tse: 138 (Winner) David Rocco: 129
