= Jason Kwan =

Hong Kong cinematographer and film director (born 1964)

- 關智耀
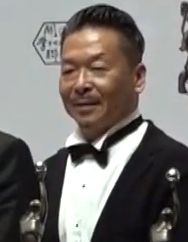
- Kwan in April 2019
- Born: Kwan Chi-yiu; 1964 (age 61–62); Hong Kong
- Education: Tokyo College of Photography
- Occupations: Cinematographer; Director
- Years active: 2004–present

Jason Kwan Chi-yiu (Chinese: 關智耀; born 1964) is a Hong Kong filmmaker. Debuting as a cinematographer in the Hong Kong cinema with All About Love (2005), Kwan was known for his collaborations with director Pang Ho-cheung, which include Love in a Puff (2010), its sequel Love in the Buff, Vulgaria (both 2012), and Aberdeen (2014). He received seven nominations for Best Cinematography at the Hong Kong Film Awards, winning with Chasing the Dragon (2017) and Project Gutenberg (2018).

Kwan also made his directorial debut with A Nail Clipper Romance (2017), an adaptation of Pang Ho-cheung's novella of the same name. He co-directed Chasing the Dragon and its sequel Chasing the Dragon II: Wild Wild Bunch (2019) with Wong Jing, and made his second solo directing effort with I Did It My Way (2024).

== Early life and education ==
Kwan was born in 1964 in Hong Kong. He studied at Pui Ying Secondary School and joined the photography club in his freshman year, which sparked his interest in cinematography. Kwan moved to Japan in 1990 and enrolled in the Tokyo College of Photography the following year to study film production. He graduated in 1993 and returned to Hong Kong, beginning to work as a freelance cinematographer. He focused on filming advertisements and music videos, including the music video for Andy Lau's "Practice", directed by Daniel Yu.

== Career ==
=== Early ventures and critical recognition (2004–2016) ===
Kwan was recommended by Daniel Yu to join the production of the 2004 Malaysian drama film Puteri Gunung Ledang, directed by Saw Teong Hin, which marked his debut in feature-film cinematography. He made his Hong Kong feature film debut with the 2005 romance film All About Love, which was also directed by Daniel Yu and starring Andy Lau. Paul Fonoroff, writing for South China Morning Post, described Kwan's cinematography in All About Love as "truly breathtaking". In the following year, he went on to cinematograph the drama film My Mother Is a Belly Dancer, produced by Andy Lau. In 2010, Kwan served as the cinematographer for Pang Ho-cheung's romantic comedy film Love in a Puff, starring Shawn Yue and Miriam Yeung. Russell Edwards of Variety praised the film's intimacy, which was achieved through the combination between Pang's helming and Kwan's lensing. The film also marked the beginning of Kwan and Pang's close collaboration, with Pang later saying that Kwan has a "keen-eyed observation of acting performances". That same year, Kwan shot the drama Merry-Go-Round, co-directed by Yan Yan Mak and Clement Cheng, and the martial arts film Bruce Lee, My Brother, directed by Raymond Yip. He earned a nomination for Best Cinematography in the 30th Hong Kong Film Awards for the former.

In 2012, Kwan returned to cinematograph the romantic comedy film Love in the Buff, the sequel to Love in a Puff, and work on another Pang comedy film, Vulgaria. He also served as the cinematographer for Longman Leung and Sunny Luk's action thriller film Cold War and Wong Jing's period drama film The Last Tycoon, receiving two nominations for Best Cinematography in the 32nd Hong Kong Film Awards with both projects. Kwan went on to film the 2013 back-to-back horror films Tales from the Dark 1 and Tales from the Dark 2, as well as the 2014 disaster film As the Light Goes Out. He was once again nominated for Best Cinematography in the 33rd Hong Kong Film Awards for As the Light Goes Out, with Maggie Lee of Variety praising the film's "monumental sense of space" achieved through Kwan's wide-angle shots of the sets. Kwan cinematographed Pang's drama film Aberdeen in 2014. Richard Kuipers, writing for the Chicago Tribune, praised Kwan's cinematography of "beautifully composed widescreen images".

In 2015, Kwan participated in the sports comedy film Full Strike. He also served as the cinematographer for Helios, another crime thriller film co-directed by Leung and Luk, shot the same year. James Marsh of Screen Daily praised Kwan's cinematography for capturing "the sheen and shadows of present-day Hong Kong" in Helios; while Maggie Lee of Variety labelled Kwan's lensing as "solid", although occasionally featuring unnecessary and flashy aerial shots. The following year, Kwan collaborated with Leung and Luk once again in the action thriller film Cold War 2, the sequel to the 2012 film, which earned him another nomination for Best Cinematography in the 36th Hong Kong Film Awards. Lan Tsu-wei, writing for Liberty Times, referred to Kwan as the key figure behind-the-scenes, whose ability to capture the actors' emotions enhanced the film's tension.

=== Directorial debut and multi-faceted career (2017–present) ===
In 2017, Kwan made his directorial debut with the fantasy romance film A Nail Clipper Romance. Starring Zhou Dongyu and Joseph Chang in lead roles, the film was adapted from Pang Ho-cheung's novella of the same name, with Pang also serving as the film's producer. Edmund Lee of South China Morning Post appreciated Kwan's development of a "vibrantly coloured" film with tones of both humour and sadness; while Lau Ying-tsz of HK01 noted that Kwan infused fresh romantic elements with absurdity, resulting in an innovative and uniquely chaotic vibe. He continued serving as the cinematographer for the drama film 29+1 and the Chinese fantasy action film Wu Kong. Kwan co-directed his second feature film Chasing the Dragon alongside Wong Jing in the same year, also serving as the film's cinematographer. Scott Clark of Starburst specifically commended Wong's choice of co-directing the film with Kwan as "a smart move", because his camera work enhanced the film's visuals in terms of period details and action scenes; and Clarence Tsui of The Hollywood Reporter credited Kwan for the film's "lavish production design and strong camerawork". Kwan won Best Cinematography in the 37th Hong Kong Film Awards with the film.

Kwan served as the cinematographer for Felix Chong's 2018 action film Project Gutenberg, for which he once again won Best Cinematography in the 38th Hong Kong Film Awards. Sarah Ward of Screen Daily described Kwan's cinematography in Project Gutenberg as "glossy, purposefully faded", providing the film "a suitably twisty but energetic sheen"; while Elizabeth Kerr of The Hollywood Reporter acknowledged Kwan's "meticulously washed-out images". In 2019, Kwan reprised his roles in Chasing the Dragon II: Wild Wild Bunch, the standalone sequel of the 2017 film, co-directing with Wong Jing and co-cinematographing with Jimmy Kwok. Edmund Lee of the South China Morning Post offered a rather critical review, panning Kwan and Wong for missing the suspense and emotional tones of the film and steering the story towards "a familiar parade of shoot-outs and car chases"; Richard Kuipers, writing for Variety, also noted the film's lack of suspense but praised the "slickly shot" widescreen visuals. He also shot the action thriller film Line Walker 2: Invisible Spy in the same year, and co-cinematographed the 2022 comedy film Chilli Laugh Story with Alan Koo.

Kwan made his second solo directing effort with the action film I Did It My Way, featuring Andy Lau, Gordon Lam, and Eddie Peng, which was produced in 2022 and released theatrically in 2024. Kwan received another nomination for Best Cinematography in the 42nd Hong Kong Film Awards, but the film was negatively received. Noel Wong stated in Free Malaysia Today that "as soon as bullets start flying, good camerawork goes out the window", criticising the plot, character motivations, and "stumbling" cinematography; Edmund Lee of South China Morning Post bashed on the "foolish" visuals and the nonsensical script, which "turn the film into an unintended comedy"; while Simon Abrams of RogerEbert.com noted that Kwan shifted his usual focus on actors to deliver a "formulaic cops-and-crooks plot". Kwan shot Nick Cheung's psychological horror film Peg O' My Heart, which premiered at the Far East Film Festival in the same year, and the 2025 direct-to-digital film Beyond the Sin.

== Filmography ==
Key
†	Denotes films that have not yet been released

Year	Title	Cinematographer	Director	Notes
2004	Puteri Gunung Ledang	Yes	No	
2005	All About Love	Yes	No	
2006	My Mother Is a Belly Dancer	Yes	No	
2010	Love in a Puff	Yes	No	
2010	Merry-Go-Round	Yes	No	
2010	Bruce Lee, My Brother	Yes	No	
2012	Love in the Buff	Yes	No	
2012	Vulgaria	Yes	No	
2012	Cold War	Yes	No	
2012	The Last Tycoon	Yes	No	
2013	Tales from the Dark 1	Yes	No	
2013	Tales from the Dark 2	Yes	No	
2014	As the Light Goes Out	Yes	No	
2014	Aberdeen	Yes	No	
2015	Full Strike	Yes	No	
2015	Helios	Yes	No	
2016	Cold War 2	Yes	No	
2017	A Nail Clipper Romance	No	Yes	
2017	29+1	Yes	No	
2017	Wu Kong	Yes	No	
2017	Chasing the Dragon	Yes	Yes	
2018	Project Gutenberg	Yes	No	
2019	Chasing the Dragon II: Wild Wild Bunch	Yes	Yes	
2019	Line Walker 2: Invisible Spy	Yes	No	
2022	Chilli Laugh Story	Yes	No	
2024	I Did It My Way	Yes	Yes	
2024	Peg O' My Heart	Yes	No	
2025	Beyond the Sin	Yes	No	
TBA	Raging Havoc †	Yes	No	

== Awards and nominations ==
Year	Award	Category	Work	Result	Ref.
2011	30th Hong Kong Film Awards	Best Cinematography	Merry-Go-Round	Nominated	
2013	32nd Hong Kong Film Awards	Best Cinematography	The Last Tycoon	Nominated	
2013	32nd Hong Kong Film Awards	Best Cinematography	Cold War	Nominated	
2014	33rd Hong Kong Film Awards	Best Cinematography	As the Light Goes Out	Nominated	
2016	36th Hong Kong Film Awards	Best Cinematography	Cold War 2	Nominated	
2017	37th Hong Kong Film Awards	Best Cinematography	Chasing the Dragon	Won	
2018	38th Hong Kong Film Awards	Best Cinematography	Project Gutenberg	Won	
2024	42nd Hong Kong Film Awards	Best Cinematography	I Did It My Way	Nominated	
