= A Terra-Cotta Warrior =

1990 Hong Kong film by Lilian Lee

- Theatrical poster
- Traditional Chinese: 秦俑
- Simplified Chinese: 古今大战秦俑情
- Hanyu Pinyin: Gǔ Jīn Dà Zhàn Qín Yǒng Qíng / Qín Yǒng
- Jyutping: Gu2 Gam1 Daai6 Zin3 Ceon4 Jung2 Cing4 / Ceon4 Jung2
- Directed by: Ching Siu-tung
- Written by: Lilian Lee
- Produced by: Hon Pau-chu; Zhu Mu; Tsui Hark
- Starring: Zhang Yimou; Gong Li
- Cinematography: Hsin-Yeh Li; Peter Pau
- Edited by: Marco Mak
- Music by: Romeo Diaz; James Wong; Joseph Koo
- Production companies: Art & Talent Groupe Inc.
- Distributed by: D & B Film Distribution (Hong Kong)
- Release date: 12 April 1990; (Hong Kong)
- Running time: 106 minutes
- Country: Hong Kong
- Languages: Mandarin; Cantonese

A Terra-Cotta Warrior, also known as Fight and Love with a Terracotta Warrior, is a 1990 Hong Kong film based on the novel by Lilian Lee, directed by Ching Siu-tung, starring Zhang Yimou and Gong Li. Producer Tsui Hark also got credited as the special effect supervisor.

The film is about a forbidden love between a court lady and a soldier of the Qin dynasty. Gong Li plays the female protagonists Dong'er (the court girl) and Zhu Lili (the actress), and Zhang Yimou plays the terracotta warrior Meng Tianfang. Warner Bros. has included the film in the catalogue of Warner Archive Collection.

== Plot ==
The First Emperor searches for the elixir of immortality, and he despatches 500 teenage boys and girls to help him accomplish this task. One of his soldiers, General Meng Tianfang falls in love with one of the despatched maiden by the name Dong'er. When their forbidden love is exposed, the girl reveals she has found the elusive elixir and secretly gives it to Meng. The emperor orders their execution and the soldier is sentenced to death by being encased alive in clay as a terracotta warrior, only to be reawakened in the 1930s when a struggling actress, Zhu Lili, the reincarnation of the girl who remembers nothing of her past life, accidentally stumbles upon the tomb of the First Emperor. The soldier struggles to adapt to a new era while the two are pursued by archeological looters and thugs.

== Cast ==
- Zhang Yimou as General Meng Tianfang (Mong Tin-Fong) / Terra-Cotta Cleaner
- Gong Li as Han Dong'er / Zhu Lili (Hon Tung Yee) / Japanese Tourist
- Yu Rongguang as Bai Yunfei (Pak Wan Fei)
- Wu Tianming as movie director
- Lu Shuming as First Emperor
- Che Bok-man as Xu Fu / tour guide (Tsui-Fok)
- David Cheung as Yuen Mong Ling
- Chiu Chi-gong
- Choi Hin-cheung

== Production ==
The film was part of a trend that started in the 1980s of Chinese ghost films, usually with a central figure of a beautiful female ghosts. Along with Clarence Fok's film The Iceman Cometh (1989), the film adds a time travel theme.

The film was shot in China in 1989. The film was Gong Li's first Hong Kong action film. In the film she portrays three incarnations of the same character.

== Release ==
A Terra-Ccotta Warrior was released in Hong Kong on April 12, 1990. The film was among the top ten highest grossing films in Hong Kong in 1990, earning $20,991,782.

== Reception ==
From contemporary reviews, Variety described it as "one of the most lavish films ever produced out of Hong Kong". They complimented that it looked expensive and was "robust fare, handled in over-the-top style." The review found the production design to be "splendid and stunt work good (except for a shakily staged escape on horseback)"

The Hong Kong film Awards for 1990 were announced on April 21, 1991. A Terra-Ccotta Warrior had eight nominations at the Hong Kong Film Awards. Romeo Diaz, James Wong, and Joseph Koo won the award for "Best Music" for their work in the film.

Lisa Morton, in her overview of Tsui Hark's filmography echoed the earlier Variety review, calling it "Unquestionably one of the lushest and loveliest films to emerge from Hong Kong in the '90s".

== See also ==
- List of Hong Kong films of 1990
