= Farewell My Concubine (film) =

1993 Chinese-Hong Kong film by Chen Kaige

- Theatrical release poster

Chinese name
- Traditional Chinese: 霸王別姬
- Simplified Chinese: 霸王别姬
- Literal meaning: The Hegemon-King Bids Farewell to His Concubine
Transcriptions
Standard Mandarin
- Hanyu Pinyin: Bà Wáng Bié Jī
- Directed by: Chen Kaige
- Screenplay by: Lu Wei; Lilian Lee
- Based on: Farewell My Concubine by Lilian Lee rewritten from Qiuhaitang by Qin Shouou
- Produced by: Hsu Feng
- Starring: Leslie Cheung; Zhang Fengyi; Gong Li
- Cinematography: Gu Changwei
- Edited by: Pei Xiaonan
- Music by: Zhao Jiping
- Production companies: Beijing Film Studio; China Film Co-Production Corporation; Tomson Films; Maverick Picture Company
- Distributed by: Miramax (United States); Artificial Eye (United Kingdom)
- Release dates: 1 January 1993 (Hong Kong); 15 October 1993 (United States)
- Running time: 171 minutes 157 minutes (censored & Miramax cuts)
- Countries: China; Hong Kong
- Language: Mandarin
- Budget: $4 million
- Box office: ¥40 million (Mainland China) $7.1 million (international)

Farewell My Concubine (Chinese: 霸王别姬, lit. 'The Hegemon-King Bids Farewell to His Concubine') is a 1993 epic historical drama film directed by Chen Kaige, starring Leslie Cheung, Gong Li and Zhang Fengyi. Based on the novel of the same name by Lilian Lee, the film is set in unstable 20th-century China, from the early formations of the Republic of China, to the aftermath of the Cultural Revolution. Its narrative depicts the troubled relationships between Peking opera actors Cheng Dieyi, Duan Xiaolou, and Xiaolou's wife Gong Juxian, and their interactions with Chinese politics and society.

The film's themes include identity confusion and blurred lines between real life and the stage, embodied by the revered opera actor Dieyi, whose unrequited love for Xiaolou persists throughout. It also addresses themes of political and societal disturbances in 20th-century China, which is typical of Chinese Fifth Generation cinema.

A co-production between mainland China and Hong Kong, Farewell My Concubine premiered on 1 January 1993 in Hong Kong. Upon release, the film received generally positive reviews from contemporary critics, and jointly won the Palme d'Or with The Piano at the 1993 Cannes Film Festival, becoming the first Chinese-language film to receive the award. It won further accolades, including a Golden Globe for Best Foreign Language Film and a BAFTA for Best Film Not in the English Language, and received two nominations at the 66th Academy Awards for Best Cinematography and Best Foreign Language Film.

A few weeks after its release in China, the Politburo of the Chinese Communist Party demanded changes be made to the film, due to unconventional depictions of traditional values and political sensitivities in its portrayal of the Communist Youth League of China. While allowing a premiere in Shanghai, the government objected to the film's representation of homosexuality and gender identity, the suicide of a leading character, and its recreation of China's 1960s turmoil.

The film was approved for further exhibition in September 1993, less than a year after its original release. However, this re-release had 14 minutes trimmed by state censors. Chinese officials felt that a re-release, as opposed to maintaining a full ban, would silence an ever-growing international backlash, and would also help their bid to host the 2000 Olympic Games in Beijing. Distributor Miramax also cut the film by 14 minutes for its United States theatrical release. In 2023, for its 30th anniversary, Film Movement released an uncut 4K restoration of Farewell My Concubine theatrically, followed by a physical media release by The Criterion Collection the following year.

Farewell My Concubine is considered one of the landmark films of the Fifth Generation movement that brought Chinese film directors to worldwide attention. In 2005, the film was selected as one of the "100 Best Films in Global History" by Time magazine.

== Plot ==
In 1924 Peking, a young boy by the name of Douzi is abandoned by his prostitute mother to a Peking opera troupe supervised by Master Guan, who like many other opera troupe leaders, would take in orphaned children as apprentices. There, Douzi is mocked by the other children for his mother's origin, but nonetheless is befriended by another boy about his age, Shitou, a boy with a talent for breaking stones with his head.

As teenagers, Douzi trains to play dan (female heroine roles), while Shitou learns jing (male hero roles). When practicing the play Dreaming of the World Outside the Nunnery, Douzi repeatedly misspeaks the line "I am by nature a girl, not a boy" as "I am by nature a boy, not a girl," for which he receives severe physical punishment. Douzi and another student, Laizi, attempt to run away; Laizi buys candied hawthorns using Douzi's few coins, but Douzi decides to pursue acting seriously after being moved by an opera performance. Upon returning, they find the whole troupe being punished for their desertion, and Douzi steps in and is beaten in Shitou's place. As a result, Laizi eats the hawthorns and later hangs himself.

Na Kun, an agent who provides funding for opera plays, comes to the troupe to seek potential actors. When Douzi repeats the same mistake in front of the agent, Shitou commands him to start over. Douzi finally delivers the entire monologue successfully and secures Na Kun's patronage. The troupe is invited to perform for eunuch Zhang. Shitou and Douzi are brought to Zhang's house where they find a finely crafted sword, which Shitou promises to one day gift to Douzi, as the hero would do for his concubine. Zhang asks to meet Douzi in his room and sexually assaults him. Shitou implicitly knows what happened, although Douzi does not speak of the assault. On their way home, Douzi rescues an abandoned baby, who later comes under Master Guan's training.

Years later, Douzi and Shitou have become Peking opera stars, taking the names Cheng Dieyi and Duan Xiaolou, respectively. Their signature performance is the play Farewell My Concubine, where Cheng Dieyi plays Consort Yu and Duan Xiaolou plays Xiang Yu; before every play, Dieyi would finish the stage makeup for Xiaolou as a small act of love. Their fame attracts the attention of the high-ranking Yuan Shiqing when he attends their performances. Yuan has come to possess the sword from Zhang's house, which he gives to Dieyi as a gift. Though pursued by Yuan, Dieyi is secretly in love with Xiaolou. Xiaolou later meets Juxian, a headstrong prostitute who buys her freedom and seeks an ordinary life with him. After Xiaolou marries her, Dieyi feels betrayed, and the relationship among Dieyi, Xiaolou, and Juxian becomes the central emotional conflict in the film. When Master Guan dies, the abandoned baby, now Xiao Si, comes under Dieyi's training to continue learning dan roles.

During the Second Sino-Japanese War, Xiaolou is arrested after confronting Japanese soldiers, and Juxian asks Dieyi to help secure his release. Dieyi performs for the Japanese in exchange for Xiaolou's freedom, but after Japan's surrender, the Kuomintang authorities charge him with treason. Xiaolou and Juxian seek Yuan's help to save him, but Juxian miscarries during the crisis. Dieyi is eventually released, yet the incident deepens the emotional distance between him, Xiaolou, and Juxian. As his personal and professional life declines, Dieyi becomes addicted to opium.

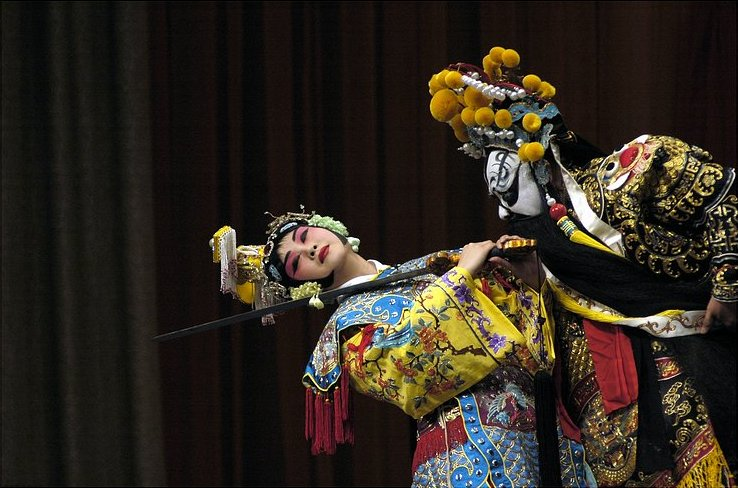
Ending of the play of the same name performed in 2007. In the film, the hegemon-king (right) is played by Xiaolou, and the concubine (left) is played by Dieyi.

When the communist forces win the civil war, Yuan is sentenced to death, and Xiao Si becomes an avid follower of the new government, questioning his teacher about his position regarding the new government approved plays and after receiving a negative answer, accuses him of being a capitalist. Dieyi's addiction negatively affects his performances and renders him unable to sing, but he ultimately quits opium with the help of Xiaolou and Juxian. Xiao Si nurtures resentment against Dieyi because of his rigorous teachings and usurps his role in Farewell My Concubine in the middle of a performance. Xiaolou initially refuses to perform with Xiao Si, but the latter implicitly threatens him with the politics of not performing for the masses, and Xiaolou continues the performance. Devastated by the betrayal, Dieyi secludes himself and refuses to reconcile with Xiaolou.

As the Cultural Revolution continues, the Peking Opera is prohibited and replaced with Maoist plays. The entire opera troupe, accused by Xiao Si and Na Kun, is forced into a struggle session by Red Guards. The opera troupe is forced to dress up and is paraded around town while being ridiculed by their captors as well as bystanders. Xiaolou's mighty and meaningful stage makeup becomes smudged after being beaten up by the Red Guards: Dieyi, in full costume of Consort Yu, calmly picks up the brush and finishes the stage makeup for a humiliated and weakened Xiaolou. Then, under pressure, Xiaolou accuses Dieyi of counterrevolutionary acts. After Xiaolou implies Dieyi is homosexual, Dieyi tells the guards that Juxian was a prostitute. To protect himself from further persecution, Xiaolou swears that he does not love Juxian and will "make a clean break" with her.

Although humiliated, neither Xiaolou or Dieyi are convicted, but must continue to reenact the play for the new government. Juxian is heartbroken and returns the sword to Dieyi before committing suicide. Xiao Si is caught by the Red Guards singing Consort Yu's lines while admiring the lavish stage jewelry he took from Dieyi.

In 1977, Dieyi and Xiaolou reunite, seeming to have mended their relationship. They once again practice Farewell My Concubine. During a break, Xiaolou begins reciting the line "I am by nature a boy," to which Dieyi makes the same mistake of finishing with "I am not a girl." As their performance reaches its climax, Dieyi takes Xiaolou's sword and kills himself, completing the role of Consort Yu and merging his own fate with the opera's tragic ending. Xiaolou screams Dieyi's name, then softly calls out "Douzi..."

== Cast ==
Actor	Character
Leslie Cheung	Cheng Dieyi (程蝶衣, Pinyin: Chéng Diéyī) / Douzi (小豆子, Pinyin: Xiǎo Dòuzi)
Yin Zhi	Cheng Dieyi (teenager)
Ma Mingwei	Cheng Dieyi (child)
Zhang Fengyi	Duan Xiaolou (段晓楼) / Xiaoshitou (小石头)
Zhao Hailong	Duan Xiaolou (teenager)
Fei Yang	Duan Xiaolou (child)
Gong Li	Juxian (菊仙 Júxiān)
Ge You	Yuan Shiqing (袁世卿 Yuán Shìqīng)
Lü Qi	Master Guan (Simplified: 关师傅, Traditional: 關師傅, Pinyin: Guān Shīfu)
Ying Da	Na Kun (那坤 Nā Kūn)
Yidi	Eunuch Zhang (Simplified: 张公公, Traditional: 張公公, Pinyin: Zhāng Gōnggong)
Zhi Yitong	Saburo Aoki (青木 三郎, Chinese Pinyin: Qīngmù Sānláng, Japanese: Aoki Saburō)
Lei Han	Xiao Si
Li Chun	Xiao Si (teenager)
Li Dan	Laizi (Simplified: 小癞子, Traditional: 小癩子, Pinyin: Xiǎo Làizǐ)
Yang Yongchao	Laizi (child)
Jiang Wenli	Mother of Xiao Douzi
Wu Dai-wai	Red Guard (Simplified: 红卫兵, Traditional: 紅衛兵, Pinyin: Hóngwèibīng)

== Production ==
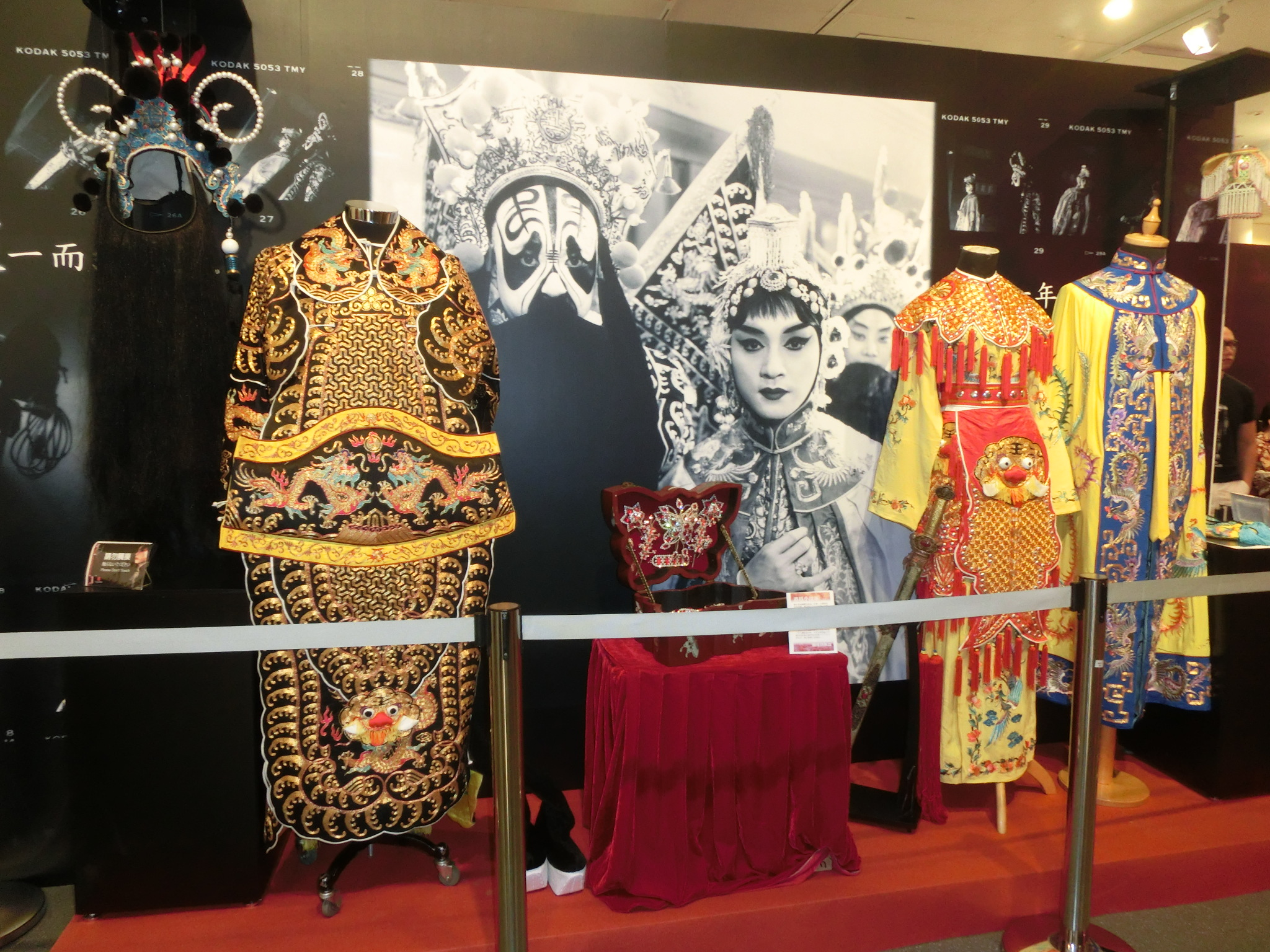
Memorabilia from the film exhibited at "The Art of Leslie Cheung's Movie Images", April 2013, Hong Kong Central Library.

Chen Kaige was best known for his previous work, Yellow Earth, which followed a "personal, direct and primitive" approach, but with Farewell My Concubine, he was looking to make a more commercialized artistic film. Chen Kaige was first given a copy of Lilian Lee's novel in 1988, and although Chen found the story of the novel to be "compelling", he thought its emotional subtext was "a bit thin". After meeting with Lee, they together recruited Chinese writer Lu Wei for the screenplay, and in 1991, he completed the first draft. The entire writing process took six months.

Jackie Chan was originally considered for the role of Cheng Dieyi due to his own childhood experience training in the China Drama Academy (a Peking opera school), but he declined the offer. John Lone, who had previously co-starred with Chen Kaige in The Last Emperor, later lobbied for the role. Kaige thought he was a good fit, but Lone failed to progress past contractual negotiations with producer Hsu Feng.

Eventually, screenwriter Lu Wei suggested popular Hong Kong actor Leslie Cheung for the role of Dieyi. He believed Cheung could attract audiences to the film, as melodramas were an unpopular genre in China at the time. Kaige was unfamiliar with the actor and had difficulty envisioning him in the role. The two argued but could not convince each other of their positions. They decided to hold a vote with three other members of the crew, including cinematographer Gu Changwei. The final vote was four in favor of Cheung, with only one dissent (director Kaige). Kaige relented and hired Cheung. Not long after his casting, Cheung arrived in Beijing. He stayed for six months to learn the art of Peking opera. Despite the widespread belief that Cheung also learned Mandarin Chinese for the role, most of his vocal performance was dubbed by Beijing actor Yang Lixin. Director Chen left Cheung's voice intact in two scenes where it is distorted by physical and mental distress.

Anita Mui was considered for the role of Juxian. However, due to Gong Li's international stardom, she was cast in the role instead.

Principal photography on Farewell My Concubine lasted from 24 February 1992 to 27 July 1992. The film was shot in chronological order. Leslie Cheung lost weight, shaved his eyebrows and altered his posture to portray the slender, effeminate Dieyi. Chen Kaige's father Chen Huai'ai, whom Kaige had denounced in the Cultural Revolution, served as the film's art director. He died two years later.

== Historical background and themes ==
Farewell My Concubine can be understood not only as the story of two Peking opera performers, but also as a reflection on modern Chinese history. Through the changing fate of opera artists, the film presents Chinese history from the early twentieth century to the late 1970s.

The film depicts five different periods in Chinese history, including the late Qing Dynasty and Warlord Era, the Republican Era, the Japanese occupation, and the Cultural Revolution. These settings were significant, as they helped in developing the structure of the film and connecting the characters' individual experiences with Chinese history.

By incorporating traditional Chinese opera, the film delves deeply into the psychological and emotional complexities of its central characters. Peking opera, as a classic Chinese traditional element, is interspersed throughout the film's narrative. The audience watches the opera's drama while simultaneously watching the movie, creating a double layered visual experience. Such addition of opera clips also contextualizes the plot, expressing the characters' state of mind while giving the audience space to interpret their actions. Each facial makeup and mask in the Peking opera represents a specific opera role: in the film, Cheng Dieyi rejects the dan mask (associated with female opera roles) at the beginning, then actively identifies with it, and finally becomes confused with his own gender. This makes his role as the Concubine blur the lines between performance and reality, leaving him unable to separate his true self from the character he plays. In this way, Peking opera is not only used as a cultural background. It also becomes a way to explore art, gender, and personal identity.

Roger Ebert noted that Dieyi was "essentially raised by the opera as a homosexual whether or not he consents", further highlighting the film's exploration of identity. Besides the rigid and grueling training of the Peking opera, Dieyi is also shaped by the societal, cultural and political forces of his time, which profoundly influence his identity as both an artist and a person.

The film also examines the survival of traditional art forms, with Peking opera being presented as both a cultural foundation and a site of personal conflict. This is especially the case in the film's Cultural Revolution segment, where Peking opera as an artform directly challenges the rigid gender norms that were upheld in Maoist China. During this segment, the political class targets Cheng's identity and "ideological performances" based on its denunciation of bourgeois traditions. In this way, the story illustrates how expressions of identity were dictated by the political organizations of Maoism. In addition, director Chen Kaige's personal experiences during the Cultural Revolution, including denouncing his own father, informed his vision for the film, adding authenticity to its depiction of the era's hardships.

Pauline Chen wrote that the violence of the Cultural Revolution recalls the abuse of Dieyi and Xiaolou's childhood. Although the Cultural Revolution was supposed to purge China's traditions and usher in a new era, Chen noted disquieting parallels between the "old" and "new" societies: "Despite Communism's promises of class and gender equality, Juxian is still reviled for her sex work, just as Dieyi's mother had been decades earlier. Like Dieyi and Xiaolou's childhood classmate Laizi, Juxian hangs herself—both figures so powerless that suicide feels like their only possible form of protest. More and more, the new society seems not the antithesis but rather a mirror image of the old, with the same groupthink and submission to authority." She believed there was only one major difference between these eras: the betrayal of friends and family in the Cultural Revolution's struggle sessions.

Jen-Hao Hsu argues that Farewell My Concubine connects personal relationships with modern Chinese history, showing how history shapes private feelings, gender roles, and artistic identity. Hsu also uses the idea of qing, or emotional attachment, to discuss Dieyi's queer identity and his deep attachment to Xiaolou.

== Release ==
=== Release in China ===
Kaige's debut Yellow Earth had been denounced by Chinese press and state censors, although it avoided a complete ban. Farewell My Concubine also faced hurdles with the censors. The film premiered in Shanghai in July 1993 but was removed from theaters after two weeks for further censorial review, and was subsequently banned in August. State censorship was a common aspect in post-Mao cinema, where films that were politically unacceptable, such as Ju Dou and Raise the Red Lantern, were removed from theaters. However, after the film won the Palme d'Or at the 1993 Cannes Film Festival, the ban was met with an international outcry. Feeling that there was "no choice" and fearing the ban hurt China's bid for the 2000 Summer Olympics, officials allowed the film to resume public showings in September. This release was censored; scenes dealing with the Cultural Revolution (led by the Chinese Communist Party) and homosexuality were edited, and the final scene was revised to "soften the blow of the suicide".

This release pattern has also been discussed in relation to other early-1990s mainland Chinese festival films. Film scholar Xudong Zhang groups Farewell My Concubine with The Blue Kite and To Live. He writes that these films retell modern Chinese history through personal and family trauma. Zhang also notes that they were often banned or heavily censored in China, but praised by critics in the West.

The 1990s saw the Chinese government trying to improve the country's image after political protests, especially in events such as the 1989 Tiananmen Square protests and massacre. Scholar David Shambaugh writes that the government's new agenda focused on "restoring the appearance of unity in the leadership, ensuring the loyalty of the military, reestablishing social order, reasserting central control over the provinces, recentralizing and retrenching the economy, and redefining China's role in a post-Cold War international environment".

The film's treatment of homosexuality and gender performance also affected its censorship and reception in Chinese-speaking contexts. Katherine Hui-Ling Chou links this response to conservative views of homosexuality and to state policy.

=== Box office ===
Despite the film's censorship woes and delayed release, it grossed approximately 40 million yuan in mainland China.

In the United States, the film was given a limited release. It opened in three theaters on 15 October 1993, grossing $69,408 in its opening weekend. The film eventually expanded to 69 theaters. At the time of its original release, the film set a box office record for mainland Chinese films in the United States. Overall, Farewell My Concubine has grossed $5,216,888 domestically (including its 2023 re-release). Outside mainland China, the film has grossed $7,133,997.

Farewell My Concubine was released in Japan in 1994, where it received a strong reception and ran in theaters continuously for 43 weeks. In addition, a 25th anniversary re-release grossed an estimated 1.57 million yuan at the Taiwanese box office.

=== International audience ===
Some critics have argued that Chen shaped the film for both domestic and international audiences, including international viewers' perceptions of sexuality in China. The film's international appeal has also been linked to its use of traditional cultural symbols. Wenxi Zhu identifies Peking opera as a key symbol in the film, connecting the protagonists' personal relationships with themes of identity and historical change. Chih-Yun Chiang reads the film as a work of transnational Chinese cinema. Chiang argues that Chen Kaige made Chinese culture visible to international viewers by turning images of Chineseness into a form of cross-cultural film language.

=== Miramax edited version ===
After the film's Cannes premiere, Miramax mogul Harvey Weinstein purchased distribution rights and removed fourteen minutes, resulting in a 157-minute cut. This was the version seen theatrically in the United States and United Kingdom in 1993.

According to Peter Biskind's book, Down and Dirty Pictures: Miramax, Sundance and the Rise of Independent Film, Louis Malle, Cannes jury president that year, said: "The film we admired so much in Cannes is not the film seen in this country [the U.S.], which is twenty minutes shorter – but seems longer because it doesn't make any sense. It was better before those guys made cuts."

The uncut 171-minute version was eventually released by Miramax on DVD.

=== 4K re-release ===
In the fall of 2023, distributor Film Movement released the 4K restoration of the film theatrically in celebration of its 30th anniversary. It was the first time the uncut version was released in North American theaters.

The Criterion Collection later announced a 4K Ultra HD/Blu-ray package for a July 2024 release.

== Music and soundtrack ==
Song type	Name	Composer	Lyrics	Singer
Theme song	Bygone Love	Jonathan Lee	Jonathan Lee	Original singer: Sandy Lam; Jonathan Lee; MV Director: Xueer Qu: Leslie Cheung covered the theme song "When Love Has Gone" in 1995.
Episode	Don't get it	Jonathan Lee	Lin Huang	Jonathan Lee; MV Director: Kaige Chen: "Don't get it" does not appear in this film, but is only included in Farewell My Concubine Movie Soundtrack.
Episode	Ode to the Motherland	Xin Wang	Xin Wang	
Episode	March of Chinese People's Liberation Army	Lüchen Zheng	Mu Gong	
Episode	Sailing the Seas Depends on the Helmsman	Shuangyin Wang	Yuwen Li	

== Reception ==
=== Critical reception ===
Roger Ebert awarded the film four stars, praising the plot as "almost unbelievably ambitious" and executed with "freedom and energy". The New York Times critic Vincent Canby hailed it for "action, history, exotic color", positively reviewing the acting of Gong Li, Leslie Cheung and Zhang Fengyi. In New York, David Denby criticized the "spectacle" but felt it would excel internationally, portraying a triumph of love and culture through the darkness. Hal Hinson, writing for The Washington Post, highlighted "its swooning infatuation with the theater- with its colors, its vitality and even its cruel rigors". Desson Howe for the same publication was less positive, writing that the first half had impact but gives way to "novel-like meandering", with less point, as the film reaches its conclusion.

Farewell My Concubine was included in The New York Times's 2004 list of The Best 1000 Movies Ever Made and Time's 2005 list of Best Movies of All Time. It was ranked No. 97 in Empire magazine's "The 100 Best Films of World Cinema" in 2010, and No. 1 in Time Out's "100 Best Mainland Chinese Films" feature in 2014. The film has a 90% approval rating on Rotten Tomatoes based on 52 reviews, with an average rating of 8.40/10. The critics consensus reads, "Chen Kaing's epic is grand in scope and presentation, and, bolstered by solid performances, the result is a film both horrifying and enthralling." Metacritic, which uses a weighted average, assigned the film a score of 84 out of 100, based on 28 critics, indicating "universal acclaim". The BBC placed the film at number 12 on its 2018 list of the 100 greatest foreign language films. It ranked at number 55 on the Hong Kong Film Awards Association (HKFAA)'s list of the Best 100 Chinese-Language Motion Pictures in 2005. The same year, to commemorate the centenary of Chinese cinema, Henderson Land Development and Hong Kong Ferry (Group) Limited conducted a poll to determine the Hong Kong public's top ten favorite Chinese-language films; Farewell My Concubine topped the list at number one.

The film's international success generated debate among Chinese critics over its relationship to Western audiences. Its emphasis on Peking Opera, political turmoil, and marginalized figures was interpreted by some as reflecting the influence of international film markets and festival expectations, while others viewed such readings as overlooking the film's critique of Chinese history and political ideology.

=== Criticism and analysis of queer portrayal ===
The film, one of the few mainstream Chinese productions featuring a queer protagonist, has become part of the queer canon in Chinese cinema. However, its treatment of homosexuality—particularly in comparison with the original novel—has been the subject of debate. Compared with Lilian Lee's novel, the film places greater emphasis on the relationship between Xiaolou and Juxian, creating a more prominent heterosexual narrative. The adaptation also alters the ending: whereas the novel concludes with the surviving protagonists leaving for Hong Kong and then going their separate ways, the film ends with Cheng Dieyi's suicide in mainland China. These changes place greater emphasis on a national historical narrative and limit some of the transgressive queer possibilities present in the source material. However, Cheng Dieyi's characterization and Leslie Cheung's performance continue to sustain queer interpretations of the film. These interpretations have noted that homosexuality is frequently portrayed through themes of gender inversion, coercion, and personal tragedy. The narrative also links sexuality to broader structures of violence, political repression, and social discipline in twentieth-century China. At the premiere of Farewell My Concubine, Leslie Cheung recalled: "Chen Kaige once said to me, 'This is 1992, not 1929. Attitudes toward homosexuality should no longer be as sensitive as before.' I was very moved when I heard that." Nevertheless, in 2002, Cheung stated in a lecture at the Chinese University of Hong Kong: "In the novel version of Farewell My Concubine, Lilian Lee's treatment of homosexuality is relatively clear, tolerant, and natural. By contrast, Chen Kaige's film adaptation is marked by extreme homophobia, distorting the autonomy and independence of gay people." In later interviews, Cheung expressed disappointment that the relationship between Cheng Dieyi and Duan Xiaolou was treated largely as a subtext in the film, despite regarding Cheng Dieyi as one of his most important roles.

Cheung believed that the expansion of the character Ju Xian, played by Gong Li, was intended "to balance the gay elements in the story", which he said reflected "the director's reluctance to address same-sex relationships". Cheung also remarked: "During filming, my performance had to compensate for the director's avoidance of homosexual themes, and I could only do my best within my ability. I thought that if the film adaptation of Farewell My Concubine had been faithful to the novel and had further developed its gay themes, its standing among films on the subject would certainly have surpassed that of Happy Together, which I later made."

The film was well received by international audiences, who praised its depiction of modern Chinese history and its engagement with taboo subjects such as the Cultural Revolution and a queer protagonist. Its international reach was facilitated by previous co-productions between China and Hong Kong, which enabled Chinese filmmakers to access global markets while bypassing certain domestic restrictions, as well as Deng Xiaoping's liberal reforms.

=== Year-end lists ===
- 6th – Joan Vadeboncoeur, Syracuse Herald American
- Top 10 (not ranked) – Dennis King, Tulsa World

=== Accolades ===
At the Cannes Film Festival, the film shared the Palme d'Or with Jane Campion's The Piano from New Zealand. Farewell My Concubine was the first, and as of 2026 remains the only, Chinese-language film to win the Palme d'Or.

Year	Award	Category	Recipient(s)	Result	Ref(s)
1993	Boston Society of Film Critics	Best Foreign Language Film	Chen Kaige	Won	
1993	Camerimage	Silver Frog	Gu Changwei	Won	
1993	Cannes Film Festival	Palme d'Or	Chen Kaige	Won	
1993	Cannes Film Festival	FIPRESCI Prize	Chen Kaige	Won	
1993	Los Angeles Film Critics Association	Best Foreign Language Film	Chen Kaige	Won	
1993	National Board of Review	Best Foreign Language Film	Chen Kaige	Won	
1993	National Board of Review	Top Foreign Language Films	Chen Kaige	Won	
1993	New York Film Critics Circle	Best Foreign Language Film	Chen Kaige	Won	
1993	New York Film Critics Circle	Best Supporting Actress	Li Gong	Won	
1994	Academy Awards	Best Foreign Language Film	Chen Kaige	Nominated	
1994	Academy Awards	Best Cinematography	Gu Changwei	Nominated	
1994	British Academy Film Awards	Best Film not in the English Language	Hsu Feng, Chen Kaige	Won	
1994	César Awards	Best Foreign Film	Chen Kaige	Nominated	
1994	Golden Globe Awards	Best Foreign Language Film	Chen Kaige	Won	
1994	London Film Critics' Circle	Best Foreign Language Film	Chen Kaige	Won	
1994	Mainichi Film Awards	Best Foreign Language Film	Chen Kaige	Won	

== See also ==
- Cinema of China
- Cinema of Hong Kong
- List of submissions to the 66th Academy Awards for Best Foreign Language Film
- List of Hong Kong submissions for the Academy Award for Best International Feature Film
- The Blue Kite, a 1993 Chinese-Hong Kong film on various political movements
- To Live, a 1994 Chinese film by Zhang Yimou spanning 1940s–1970s
