= David Rocco =

Canadian television producer

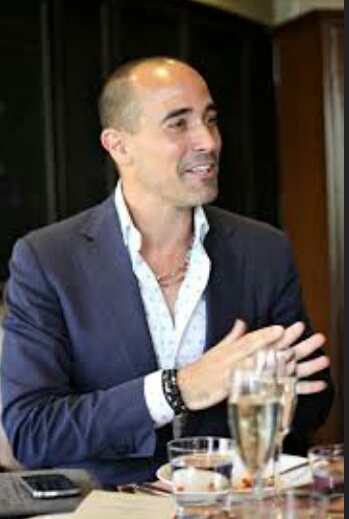
- Born: July 27, 1970 (age 56); Scarborough, Ontario, Canada
- Spouse: Nina Rocco (m. 1995)
- Children: 3
- Culinary career
- Cooking style: Italian
- Television shows
- David Rocco's Dolce Vita; David Rocco's Dolce Napoli; David Rocco's Amalfi Getaway; David Rocco's Dolce India; David Rocco's Dolce Africa; David Rocco's Dolce Italia; David Rocco's Dolce Southeast Asia; David Rocco's Dolce HomeMade

David Rocco (born July 27, 1970) is a Canadian author, chef, and host of several internationally syndicated television series. He is most known for producing and hosting the television series David Rocco's Dolce Vita, and publishing four cookbooks Avventura, David Rocco's Dolce Vita, Made in Italy, and David Rocco's Dolce Famiglia.

== Early life ==
David Rocco was born on July 27, 1970, in Scarborough, Ontario, Canada, to Italian immigrants from Naples, Italy. His parents were both hairdressers, and he is the youngest of three children. Rocco later moved with his family to Woodbridge, Ontario as a teenager.

In 1995, he married his high school sweetheart, Nina. The couple later moved to Rosedale, Toronto, and have twin daughters and a son.

Rocco was a model as a teenager, and worked for agencies including Elite and Armstrong Men. He and Nina took acting classes together and both also studied at York University. The couple ran a restaurant, La Madonnina, in Woodbridge, but gave it up a year later to pursue acting.

== Career ==
In 1997, without success in the feature film world, Rocco figured a food show would be better. He and his wife, on holiday in Italy, shot a video showcasing different foods, and later showed it to a Toronto production company. This led to a 26-episode TV series featuring food and travel called Avventura: Journey in Italian Cuisine.

In 2005, Rocco's self-produced TV series David Rocco's Dolce Vita premiered on Food Network Canada. It ended in 2010 after five seasons, and reached an international audience, including in the U.S. on the Cooking Channel.

Several spin-offs of the show followed including, David Rocco's Dolce Napoli (2011–17), David Rocco's Amalfi Getaway (2012), David Rocco's Dolce India (2013–14), David Rocco's Dolce Africa (2018), David Rocco's Dolce Italia (2020), David Rocco's Dolce Southeast Asia (2020), and David Rocco's Dolce HomeMade (2022).

In 2018, Rocco and Hong Kong singer Nicholas Tse co-hosted FOX Life's Celebrity Chef: East vs West.

== Cook books ==
Rocco has published four cookbooks:

- Avventura (Bay Books; January 2001)
- David Rocco's Dolce Vita (HarperCollins; November 2008)
- Made In Italy (Clarkson Potter, HarperCollins; October 2011)
- Dolce Famiglia (HarperCollins; November 2016)

== Other ventures ==
In 2015, Rocco launched a line of wines, a Chianti, a Prosecco and a Pinot Grigio named David Rocco's Dolce Vita.

In 2021, Rocco opened a Yorkville, Toronto restaurant called David Rocco - Bar Aperitivo. In 2022, Rocco launched his own line of Italian-made pastas (orecchiette, strozzapreti, and fusilli pugliesi) and sauces (pomodoro & basilico, arrabbiata, puttanesca, and ricotta & pecorino).
