= Lilian Lee =

Hong Kong writer and screenwriter

- 李碧華
- Born: Li Pi-Hua; 1959 (age 66–67) Ancestral hometown: Taishan, Guangdong
- Other names: Lilian Lee; Lillian Lee; Lee Pik-wah
- Occupations: novelist, screenwriter, reporter
- Years active: circa 1990s–present

Li Pi-Hua (traditional Chinese: 李碧華; simplified Chinese: 李碧华; Sidney Lau: Lee^{3}Pik^{1}Wah^{4}; born 1959 as 李碧華 Li Pi-Hua), also known as Lilian Lee, Lillian Lee and Lee Pik-wah, is a Hong Kong novelist, screenwriter and reporter.

Lee's writing is known for blending traditional Chinese, supernatural and everyday Hong Kong elements into her narratives. Her works, Rouge, Farewell My Concubine, and Green Snake, were adapted for films in the 1980s and 1990s, giving her greater international visibility. In those instances, Lee also co-wrote the screenplays. Her novels and essays have appeared in newspapers across Singapore, Malaysia, and Hong Kong.

One of Hong Kong's best-selling authors, Lee has published more than 120 titles (as of 2018) through Hong Kong's bookseller Cosmos Books (天地圖書). With the exception of Farewell My Concubine and Kawashima Yoshiko, most of her books have yet to be translated from Chinese into English or made widely available.

== Biography ==
=== Family and early life ===
Lee's ancestral homeland is Taishan, Guangdong Province, China. She was born Li Pak (李白) to a rich and big family in Hong Kong. Her wealthy paternal grandfather had four wives and passed the family business of traditional Chinese medicine to her father. She was brought up in a large old house and heard many stories which would later become her source of inspiration.

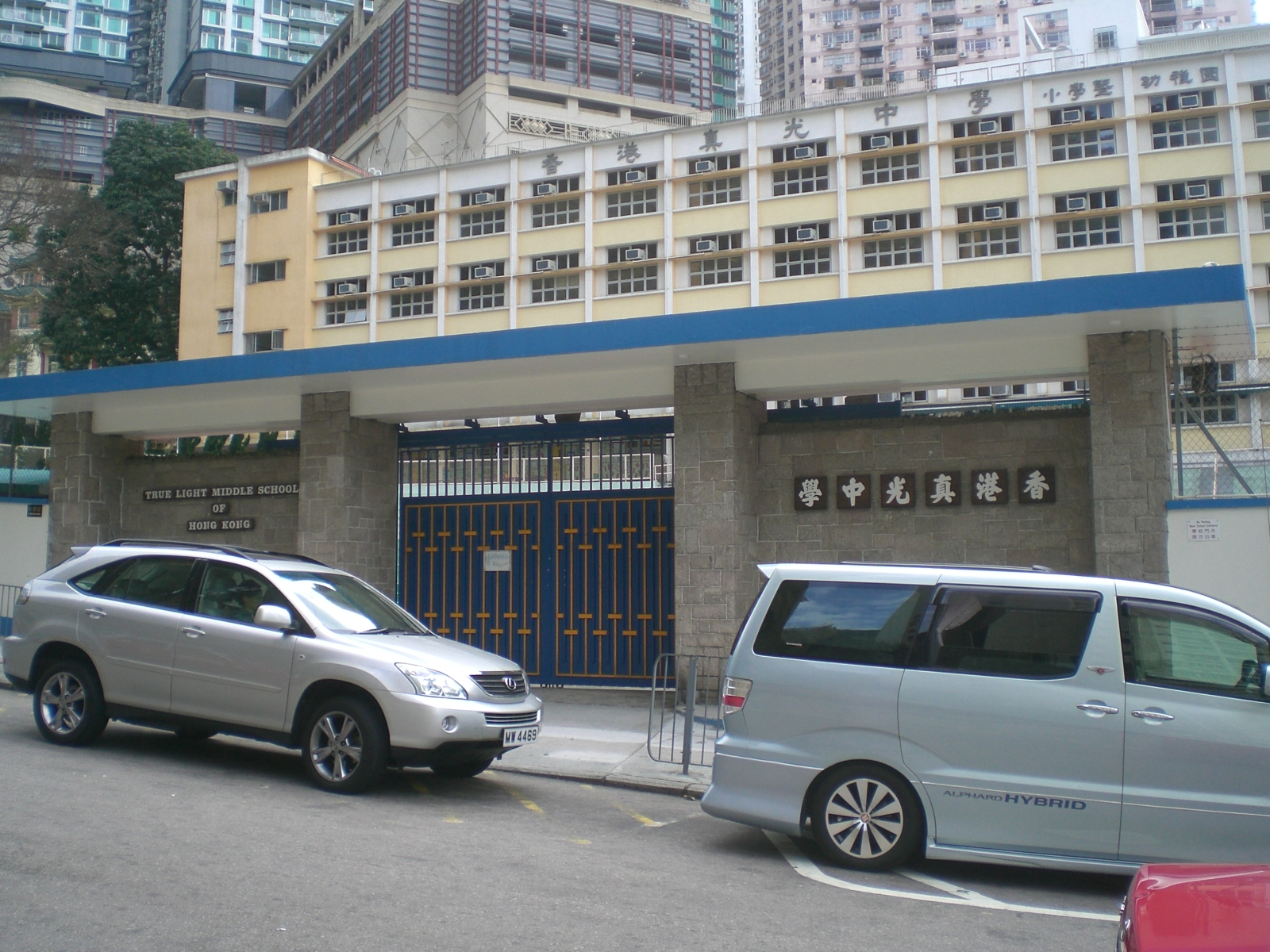
True Light Middle School of Hong Kong

=== Education and occupation ===
Since her youth, Lee has developed a strong passion for literature. As a student of True Light Middle School of Hong Kong, she actively contributed to Happy Family and Chinese Student Weekly (中國學生周報). She once studied at Kyoto University, Japan, and has had various jobs. She was a primary school teacher while working as a reporter. Lee has worked as a screenwriter for TV series, movie and dramas.

At a young age, she learned Traditional Chinese Dance for about ten years. Lee has danced for a dance company in New York. With her experience as a dancer, Lee helped organize several dance dramas for the Hong Kong Dance Company. In 2001, Lee directed a dance drama adapted from her novel Fen Mo Chun Qiu (粉墨春秋), performed by Hua Jin Dance Company. In 2013, she worked with the National Theatre Company of China and adapted her novel Green Snake into a dance drama.

=== Literary style ===
Lee's novels depict romantic relationships and tensions between men and women that are tinged with sadness. She has said they are inspired by personal experience. Lee often adapts elements of early Chinese vernacular literature and the supernatural, to retell a well-known theme or story from an underdog perspective. Her novel Green Snake was based on White Snake, an ancient Chinese novel in which two snakes become humans and learn about love and suffering. This treatment is an evolution from the original story, White Snake, where Green Snake is only a supporting character. Green Snake, the emotional and beautiful Green Snake is the main character, who is in love with Xu Xian.

In Rouge, the main character Fleur, who worked in one of Hong Kong's "flower houses," and comes back to life 50 years later to be reunited with her lover Chan Chen-Pang whom she involved in a double suicide. In Terracotta Warrior, the immortal Mong Tiang Fong wakes up after 2000 years. Golden Lotus in The Reincarnation of Golden Lotus is a spirit.

== Novels ==
- Rouge (胭脂扣)
- Farewell My Concubine (霸王别姬)
- Green Snake (青蛇)
- Sheng Si Qiao (生死橋)
- The Reincarnation of Golden Lotus (潘金蓮之前世今生)
- Fight and Love with a Terracotta Warrior (秦俑)
- Kawashima Yoshiko (滿洲國妖艷——川島芳子)
- Temptation of a Monk (誘僧)
- Dumplings (餃子)

== Films adapted from Lee's novels ==
- Heritage: The Young Concubine (1980)
- Father and Son (1981)
- Rouge (1988)
- The Reincarnation of Golden Lotus (1989)
- Fight and Love with a Terracotta Warrior (1990)
- Kawashima Yoshiko (1990)
- Red and Black aka Gui Gan Bu (Ghost Cadre) (1991)
- Farewell My Concubine (1993)
- Green Snake (1993)
- Temptation of a Monk (1993)
- Dumplings (2004)
- Sheng Si Qiao (2007)
- Tales from the Dark 1 (2013)
- Tales from the Dark 2 (2013)

== Awards ==
- Father and Son, Hong Kong Film Award for Best Film, 1982
- Rouge, Hong Kong Film Award for Best Screenplay 1985
- Fight and Love with a Terracotta Warrior, Hong Kong Film Award for Best Screenplay (Nominated), 1989
- Kawashima Yoshiko, Asian Pacific Film Festival, Academy Award for Best Art Direction, 1990
- Temptation of a Monk, Golden Horse Award for Best Original Screenplay (Nominated), 1993
- Farewell My Concubine, Palme d'Or, 1993
- Farewell My Concubine, Golden Globe Award for Best Foreign Language Film, 1993
