= All About Love (2005 film) =

2005 Hong Kong film by Daniel Yu

- Theatrical poster
- Directed by: Daniel Yu; Kung LOk Lee
- Written by: Daniel Yu; Kung LOk Lee
- Starring: Andy Lau; Charlie Yeung; Charlene Choi
- Cinematography: Jason Kwan
- Release date: 20 October 2005
- Running time: 102 minutes
- Country: Hong Kong
- Language: Cantonese
- Box office: $1,479,325

All About Love (traditional Chinese: 再説一次我愛你; simplified Chinese: 再说一次我爱你; pinyin: zài shuō yī cì wǒ aì nǐ; Cantonese Yale: joi3 syut yat1 chi3 ngo5 oi nei5) is a 2005 Hong Kong romance film directed by Daniel Yu Wai-Kwok starring Andy Lau, Charlie Yeung and Charlene Choi.

== Plot summary ==
Ko (Andy Lau) is a hard working doctor who has little time to spend with his wife (Charlene Choi). When she dies in a car accident her heart is given to another woman, Tse Yuen Sam (Charlie Yeung). Ko later changes careers and becomes a paramedic. One night while on call in an ambulance, Ko attends a traffic accident involving Sam. He discovers she is the recipient of his wife's heart and that her husband Derek (also played by Lau) has left her. Ko decides to use their resemblance as a means of making amends for both his and Derek's treatment of their wives.

== Cast ==
- Ko/Derek: Andy Lau
- Tse Yuen Sam: Charlie Yeung
- Zi Qing: Charlene Choi
- Ko's colleague: Lam Suet
- Ko's father: Benz Hui
- Heart surgeon: Anthony Wong
- Sasha Hou
- Andrew Lin
- Gigi Wong
- Joe Cheung

== See also ==
- List of Hong Kong films
