= Tales from the Dark 2 =

2013 Hong Kong film by Gordon Chan, Lawrence Ah Mon and Teddy Robin

- Theatrical release poster
- Directed by: Gordon Chan (Pillow); Lawrence Ah Mon (Hide and Seek); Teddy Robin (Black Umbrella)
- Written by: Gordon Chan (Pillow); Mathew Tang (Hide and Seek); Lilian Lee (Black Umbrella)
- Based on: short stories by Lilian Lee
- Produced by: Mathew Tang; Bill Kong
- Cinematography: Chan Chi-ying (Pillow); Wade Muller (Hide and Seek); Jason Kwan (Black Umbrella)
- Edited by: Chan Ki-hop (Pillow); Lawrence Ah Mon (Hide and Seek); Wenders Li (Black Umbrella)
- Music by: Kenji Kawai
- Production company: Movie Addict Productions
- Release date: 8 August 2013
- Running time: 87 minutes
- Country: Hong Kong
- Languages: Cantonese; Mandarin

Tales from the Dark 2 (Chinese: 李碧華鬼魅系列: 奇幻夜; lit. 'Li Bihua's Ghost Series: Fantasy Night') is a 2013 Hong Kong horror anthology film directed by Gordon Chan, Lawrence Ah Mon and Teddy Robin. A sequel to Tales from the Dark 1, the film is also divided into three segments based on short stories by Lilian Lee. The first part, titled Pillow (枕妖), starred Fala Chen as an insomniac woman who purchases a cursed pillow after the apparent disappearance of her boyfriend (Gordon Lam). The second part, Hide and Seek (迷藏), is about a group of youngsters who return to their old primary school to play hide-and-seek at night. The final part, Black Umbrella (黑傘), starred Teddy Robin as an umbrella-carrying man who encounters lowlifes as he travels along the streets of Hong Kong late at night. The film was released on 8 August 2013, about four weeks after the release of the first film.

== Plot ==
Pillow

Ching-yi is a nurse who struggles with insomnia after her boyfriend Ho-hong leaves her and disappears following a quarrel between them. After buying a new pillow stuffed with aromatic herbs, she finally manages to fall asleep and starts having dreams of herself having sex with Ho-hong. Over time, the more she uses the pillow, the more her health degenerates. It turns out that Ching-yi had accidentally stabbed Ho-hong in the neck and killed him during the quarrel. She had then cleaned and vacuum-sealed his body in a bag before hiding it in the closet. The man whom Ching-yi has been having sex with in her dreams is actually an incubus-like demon in disguise as her dead boyfriend and he has been draining her "life force". One day, after receiving a mysterious tip-off, security officers force their way into the apartment and find Ching-yi in critical condition.

Hide and Seek

A group of youngsters visit the old primary school which they graduated from. The school is about to be demolished and has been completely abandoned except for the old caretaker still living there. Ignoring the caretaker's warning to leave before dark, they play a variation of hide-and-seek around the campus and unknowingly attract the attention of the ghosts haunting the school. It is revealed at the end that all the youngsters had been lost to the netherworld and did not survive that night.

Black Umbrella

Uncle Lam, a short elderly man carrying a black umbrella, travels along the streets at night during the Ghost Festival. For each good deed he does, he carves a mark on the umbrella handle. He saves a woman from getting knocked down by a bus, alerts the police to a thug beating up a man, and lectures a young robber attempting to rob him and a minibus driver. Later, he encounters Jenny, a prostitute who tricks him into accompanying her to her apartment after pretending to sprain her foot. When he declines her services, she turns nasty and tries to extort money from him. He attempts to leave but she screams for help from her bodyguard, who turns out to be the thug whom Lam confronted earlier. Cornered and about to be attacked, Lam reveals his true identity as a demonic creature. He kills both of them and devours Jenny's innards, much to the horror of those whom enter the room and witness it.

== Cast ==
Pillow

- Fala Chen as Chow Ching-yi
- Gordon Lam as Yun Ho-hong
- Tony Ho as Dr Kwan
- Joman Chiang as Mabel
- Lam Chiu-wing as the shop owner
- Ian Yim as a policeman
- Crystal Black as a policewoman

Hide and Seek

- Chan Fat-kuk as Fatty Keung
- Kaki Sham as Char-siu
- Kiki Tam as Ceci
- Pam Cheung as Princess
- Ronny Yuen as Tat
- Tong Kit-leung as C Hing
- Wong Yat-ho as Sissy
- Jacqueline Chan as Little Bo
- Eric Leung as Mr Lee
- Lai Hon-chi as Uncle Chan
- Lam Suk-ching as the principal
- Chan Lai-ling as Fatty Keung's mother

Black Umbrella

- Teddy Robin as Uncle Lam
- Aliza Mo as Jenny
- Cheung Kwok-keung as the minibus driver
- Kelvin Kwan as the young robber
- Vincent Wan as the thug
- Lana Wong as the woman in red
- Yick Tin-hung as Keung

== Reception ==
In Film Business Asia, Derek Elley gave it a 5 out of 10 and said that "two strong stories bookend a weak central one." In The Hollywood Reporter, Clarence Tsui said the "three half-hour horror shorts attain uneven levels of scary moments, with Lawrence Lau’s old-school shock-and-awe approach coming out tops."

== See also ==
- List of Hong Kong Category III films
