= I Did It My Way (film) =

2023 Hong Kong film by Jason Kwan

- Theatrical release poster
- Traditional Chinese: 潛行
- Simplified Chinese: 潜行
- Literal meaning: Sneak
- Hanyu Pinyin: Qián Xíng
- Jyutping: Chim4 Hang4
- Directed by: Jason Kwan
- Written by: Chiu Nga-fei; Tse Ching-wah
- Produced by: Andy Lau; Connie Wong
- Starring: Andy Lau; Gordon Lam; Eddie Peng; Cya Liu; Simon Yam
- Cinematography: Jason Kwan
- Edited by: Alan Cheng
- Music by: Day Tai
- Production companies: Infinitus Jupiter Productions; Shanghai Ben Xiao Hai Film & TV Culture Media; Alibaba Pictures; Super Lion Culture Communication; Universe Entertainment; Infinitus Entertainment; Beijing Bad Monkey Cultural Industry Development; Huawen Pictures
- Distributed by: Universe Films Distribution; Focus Films (Hong Kong, Worldwide); Edko Films (Hong Kong)
- Release dates: 29 December 2023 (China); 11 January 2024 (Hong Kong)
- Running time: 115 minutes
- Country: Hong Kong
- Language: Cantonese
- Box office: US$55.7 million (Note: See Box office)

I Did It My Way is a 2023 Hong Kong action film directed by Jason Kwan, produced by and starring Andy Lau. The film focuses on the physical and psychological warfare between undercover drug enforcement police officers.

Production for I Did It My Way began in April 2022 and ended on 10 August of the same year. The film was released on 29 December 2023 in China and on 11 January 2024 in Hong Kong.

== Plot ==
Four tons of drugs secretly arrived in Hong Kong and disappeared. The man behind the scenes was actually the seemingly harmless lawyer George Lam. With the help of live streaming drug trafficking on the dark web, his close friend and beloved wife encountered changes one after another. Reaching a dead end, Lam went completely crazy and wanted to make the whole world pay the price.

== Cast ==
- Andy Lau as George Lam, a barrister who is actually a major drug lord known as "The Boss" and utilizes the dark web to traffick mass amounts of drugs throughout the world. He turned to drug trafficking after his fiance, Vivian, was raped and developed depression.
- Gordon Lam as Sau Ho, Lam's trusted enforcer and close friend who is actually an undercover police officer of the Narcotics Bureau of the Hong Kong Police Force. After being undercover for over a decade, he feels torn between his friendship with Lam and his duties as a police officer.
- Eddie Peng as Eddie Fong, superintendent of the Cybercrime Investigation Unit.
- Simon Yam as Chung Kam-ming, Assistant Commissioner of Police and Fong's superior officer. (special appearance)
- Cya Liu as Vivian Ha, Lam's pregnant fiance.
- Lam Suet as Yuen Muk-yu, chief inspector of the Narcotics Bureau and Sau's undercover handler.
- Kent Cheng as Uncle Cat, owner of a dai pai dong which Lam frequently visits.
- Philip Keung as Chan Chiu-sang, nicknamed Uncle Chiu, a drug dealer who is believed to be "The Boss" but is actually an executer for Lam's drug deals.
- Hedwig Tam as Maggie Kong, Sau's wife. (guest appearance)
- Terrance Lau as Davis, a hacker who works for Lam. (guest appearance)
- Kevin Chu as Chan Sun-nam, an undercover officer of the Cybercrime Investigation Unit sent to infiltrate Uncle Chiu and then Lam after Chiu's arrest and suicide. (guest appearance)
- Angie Cheung as Chan Chiu-sang's wife.
- Mike Leeder as Javier Escobar, a South American military leader and Lam's business partner.
- Tony Ho
- Chan Chun-fung
- Motor Cheng
- Giselle Lam
- Justin Chu

== Theme song ==
The theme song for the film played over the end credits, titled "Understanding the Reasoning" (道理都懂), available in both Cantonese and Mandarin versions, is composed by Qin Lei and is sung by Andy Lau, with Lau also writing the lyrics for the Cantonese version of the song while the lyrics for the Mandarin version of the song are written by Tang Tian. An alternate Mandarin version of the song sung by Cya Liu, which is not played in the film, was also released for promotion.

== Production ==
News for the film was first reported by the Hong Kong media on 13 June 2022 that a new action film tentatively titled Bring in the Wine (將進酒) directed by Jason Kwan and starring Andy Lau, Gordon Lam, Eddie Peng and Kevin Chu is set to begin production, with Lau also producing while Chin Ka-lok and Dion Lam serve as action directors. On 18 June 2022, Lau mentioned in a video for the 34th anniversary of his fan club, Andy World Club, that he was working on the film in Hong Kong, which has a new Chinese title (潛行, lit. "Sneak) as the previous title has been registered and cannot be used. The following day (19 June), filming of a scene took place at a noodle stall in Ngau Tau Kok where Lau, Lam, Peng, Simon Yam and Kent Cheng while it was also reported that the film has begun production in the month of April.

On 12 July 2022, the film released it first teaser poster which featured Lau, Lam and Peng and unveiled its official English title, I Did It My Way, displaying a slated release date of 2023. The following day (13 July) it was reported that Lam had sustained an injury while filming a stunt sequence in Tsing Yi and was hurt when he protected a child actor that he was holding from falling on uneven ground with gravels and rocks. Lam was temporarily immobilized and was conveyed to the hospital but later responded to the media and assured it was not a serious injury and he was recovering while four days later, Lam can be seen discharged from the hospital as he attended the 40th Hong Kong Film Awards on 17 July.

Filming for an action sequence which is set in an island in Malaysia where Lau's character, George Lam, is ambushed by South American mercenaries during the wedding of Lau and Liu's character, Vivian, took twelve nights to complete. The production encountered heavy rain storms every night on the location, including RED rainstorm signals on certain nights. A large set was built on the beach where a major shootout occurs which accumulates into a major explosion which took 3–4 hours to film. As producer, Lau worked extensively with action director Chin on each shot of the scene including the position and blocking of the actors and how the action and dialogue complement each other.

Production for I Did It My Way officially wrapped up on 10 August 2022.

== Marketing ==
On 4 November 2023, producer and star Lau alongside director Kwan and cast members Lam, Peng, Liu, Yam, Terrance Lau and Chu promoted the film at the 36th Golden Rooster Awards. At the press conference, Lau's portrayal of a "fierce" villain in the film became a focus while Kwan and the cast also praised Lau as being a "fierce" actor and producer who set high standards for the film and himself. Photos where each attendee personally took with Lau in the past were also showcased. Each of them spoke of their experiences working with Lau and expressed gratitude for Lau's past favors to them.

On 22 December 2023, a promotion song for the film was released, with Lau and George Lam singing a cover version of the 1982 song, "Hard to Separate Good and Evil" (難為正邪定分界), which was originally sung by Johnny Yip and Mak Chi-sing, composed by Joseph Koo and lyrics written by Cheng Kwok-kong. The music video for the song was made using AI generated visuals of Lau and Lam and was directed by female director Junie Lau, who had previously won an international competition for a self-made AI music video and was discovered by Lau through social media.

== Release ==
I Did It My Way was theatrically released on 29 December 2023 in China and on 11 January 2024 in Hong Kong. The first teaser trailer for the film was released on 17 January 2023.

== Reception ==
=== Box office ===
I Did It My Way has grossed a total of US$55.7 million worldwide combining its box office totals from Hong Kong (US$1.4 million), China (US$54.1 million), North America (US$198,405) and Russia (US$1,119).

In Hong Kong, the film debuted at No. 2 during its opening weekend, grossing HK$4,891,447 (US$625,457) during its first four days of release including previews. The film remained at second place during its second weekend grossing HK$3,580,373 (US $458,008), and has grossed a total of HK$8,469,121 (US$1,083,386) by then. During its third weekend, the film grossed HK$1,690,604 (US$216,328), remaining at No. 3 for its third consecutive week, while accumulating a total gross of HK$10,159,725 (US $1,300,029) so far. The film grossed HK$749,557 (US$95,833) in its fourth weekend, coming in at No. 4, while having grossed a total of HK$10,909,522 (US$1,394,819) so far.

In China, the film debuted at No. 3 during its opening weekend, grossing US$26.6 million during its first three days of release. The film grossed US$5.6 million in its second weekend, coming in at No. 3, and had grossed a total of US$31.4 million by then. During its third weekend, the film grossed US$2.7 million, coming No. 5, having accumulated a total gross of US$47.7 million so far.

During its limited theatrical run in North America, the film grossed US$75,873 in its opening weekend playing at 36 theatres, coming in at No. 27. In its second weekend, the film grossed US$25,610, coming in at No. 34, while accumulating a total gross of US$147,970 by then. During its third weekend as the number of theatres playing the film dropped to only 13, the film grossed US$11,727, coming in at No. 40, and has accumulated a total gross of US$175,531 by then. With theatre counts reduced to only four, the film grossed US$6,912 during its fourth weekend, coming in at No. 44, while having grossed a total of US$190,686 by then. The film's theatre counts were reduced to only two during its fifth weekend where it grossed US$2,100, coming in at No. 56, while accumulating a total gross of US$198,405 so far.

=== Critical reception ===
Simon Abrams of RogerEbert.com, stating the film "exemplifies the current state of mass-oriented Hong Kong genre cinema, leaning hard on its seasoned cast to both remind viewers of better movies and carry this one around the bases fast enough that you still get your money's worth", while also praising Lau's performance as the villain being the film's main draw. Dan Skip Allen of the Critics Association of Central Florida praises the film's realistic cinematography and depiction of technology as well as the action sequences which he describes as one of the best parts of the film, while also giving praise the performances of main cast members Lau, Lam, Peng and Liu. Christopher Cross of Asynchronous Media praises Chin Ka-lok's action choreography while criticizing the film's inaccurate portrayal of technology and one-dimensional characters, noting Lau and Lam's performances are the only ones carrying the film. Avi Offer of The NYC Movie Guru praises the film's action sequences but criticizes the convoluted plot and unmemorable characters. Tay Yek-keak of Today Online gave the film a score of 3/5 praising Lau and Lam's performance and the undercover angle of the story which reminances Infernal Affairs while feeling that Peng is underused in his role. Edmund Lee of the South China Morning Post gave the film a score of 2/5 stars, criticizing its illogical screenplay and inaccurate depiction of the internet while praising Lam's performance as the film's highlight.

== See also ==
- Andy Lau filmography
