= A Nail Clipper Romance =

2017 Chinese-Hong Kong film by Jason Kwan

- Theatrical release poster
- Traditional Chinese: 指甲刀人魔
- Simplified Chinese: 指甲刀人魔
- Hanyu Pinyin: Zhǐjiǎdāo rén mó
- Jyutping: Zi^{2} Gaap^{3} Dou^{1} Jan^{4} Mo^{1}
- Directed by: Jason Kwan
- Screenplay by: Jody Luk; Duan Li; Frances You
- Produced by: Pang Ho-cheung; Subi Liang
- Starring: Zhou Dongyu; Joseph Chang
- Cinematography: Radium Cheung
- Edited by: Wenders Li
- Music by: Gabriele Roberto
- Production companies: Beijing Jiaying Spring Film; Sun Entertainment Culture; Beijing J.Q. Pictures; Donghai Xuri Film
- Distributed by: Bravos Pictures
- Release dates: 10 April 2017 (KITEC); 14 April 2017 (China & Hong Kong)
- Running time: 99 minutes
- Countries: China; Hong Kong
- Languages: Mandarin; Cantonese

A Nail Clipper Romance (Chinese: 指甲刀人魔) is a 2017 fantasy romance film directed by Jason Kwan in his directorial debut. The film is a co-production between China and Hong Kong and is adapted from a novella of the same name by Pang Ho-cheung, who also serves as the producer. Starring Zhou Dongyu and Joseph Chang, the story revolves around a recently broken-up man (Chang) who meets and falls in love with a girl claiming to be a monster that feeds on nail clippers (Zhou).

Pang Ho-cheung initially intended to adapt his novella in 2007 while producing the anthology film Trivial Matters. In 2010, he adapted it into a short film directed by Derek Tsang and starring Zhou Xun and Lawrence Chou. Upon release, Pang decided to extend the story beyond its original open ending and develop it into a feature-length film, with the project first announced in early 2014. Principal photography began that same year and concluded before March 2015, with the film entering its promotional cycle in early 2016.

The film was originally scheduled to have its world premiere in competition at the 11th Osaka Asian Film Festival in March 2016, but it was withdrawn a month prior. It eventually premiered on 10 April 2017, followed by theatrical releases in China and Hong Kong on 14 April.

== Plot ==
After catching his girlfriend cheating and breaking up with her, Sean goes surfing to cope with his emotions but accidentally drowns. Hospitalized, his friends mistakenly think he is attempting suicide and try to cheer him up by taking him to a party at a bar. He is approached by a group of girls, one of whom, a Chinese-speaking girl, licks his face and leaves.

The next day, while delivering a surfboard to a local store, he meets the girl, Emily, again. She explains that she was drunk and lost a game with her friends, which required her to lick a stranger's face as punishment. They chat and get to know each other better, and Emily decides to take Sean graffitiing on the street. As they begin to bond, Sean invites Emily to dinner, although she insists she is on a diet and refuses to eat anything. Afterwards, Sean shows Emily a vintage car left behind by his deceased father, which he is reluctant to sell. As their relationship develops, Emily begins staying at Sean's place. One day, Sean discovers a nail clipper that has been bitten in half in the bathroom and asks Emily about it. She panics, throws it away, and makes an excuse to leave. Feeling that her secret is exposed, Emily later confesses to Sean that she is actually a "nail clipper monster", a creature that resembles humans but feeds on nail clippers. Sean is confused and skeptical at first, but Emily gives him an elaborate explanation about her race, detailing how her ancestors came to America during the Gold rush to find metals for nail clippers.

Sean shares this information with his friends, who all think Emily is bluffing, except for Sean, who begins to consider that she might be telling the truth. His friends suggest testing Emily by asking her to eat a nail clipper or explaining why she needs a fridge in her house, but Emily cleverly dodges all these challenges. She shares her dream with Sean, expressing a desire for her race to be accepted by humans and no longer have to hide, even mentioning the idea of opening a café for nail clipper monsters. To Emily's surprise, Sean sells his father's vintage car and gives her the money as startup funds for the café. Moved by his gesture, Emily confesses her love for Sean. The couple buys a shop and begins renovating it, deciding not to include a kitchen and to create a large wall adorned with nail clipper decorations, in line with the café's theme. They enthusiastically run the café for a short time, but find that there are no customers at all. Realizing Sean is about to lose all his money, Emily decides to close the café and leaves him, urging Sean to sell the shop to at least recover some capital.

Heartbroken by Emily's departure, Sean fulfills her wish and puts the café up for sale. However, due to its lack of a kitchen and its unusual design, potential buyers refuse to make offers, forcing Sean to lower the price until a man agrees to buy it. Sean's friends think Emily is a scammer and encourage him to move on. His best friend even hires an investigator to look into Emily's background, revealing that she is actually a Chinese woman who grew up in Hawaii, not a Joseon expatriate hiding from the world as she claimed. The buyer of the café turns out to be her cousin's boyfriend, who easily adds a kitchen by removing the nail clipper decoration wall that connects to an empty attic. Unwilling to believe this, Sean insists on traveling around the globe to find Emily.

Six months later, Sean returns to attend his best friend's wedding and considers developing a relationship with a friend who has secretly loved him for years. Meanwhile, Emily receives a parcel at her new place containing a pack of nail clippers from her favorite brand. At last, Emily is seen happily munching on a roof with several nail clippers missing from the pack.

== Cast ==
- Zhou Dongyu as Emily, a young "nail clipper monster" who feeds on nail clippers
- Joseph Chang as Sean, a surfboard shaper and Emily's love interest
- Zaizai Lin as Lulu, Sean's friend who adores him in secret
- Nadow Lin as Matt, Sean's best friend

Also featuring special appearances by Evonne Sie as Fion, Sean's cousin; Ekin Cheng as Master, Sean's surfboard-shaping mentor; and Tiffany Ann Hsu as Carman, Sean's ex-girlfriend.

== Production ==
=== Development ===
In 2007, Pang Ho-cheung adapted all seven novellas from his short story collection Trivial Matters into an anthology film of the same name, serving as the producer. Pang found one of the novellas, A Nail Clipper Romance, could not be fully represented within the film's 30-minute segment limit, so he decided to exclude it from the adaptation and sought other opportunities to bring it to the screen. The novella centers on a monster that feeds on nail clippers, inspired by Pang's childhood experiences of frequently losing nail clippers at home and imagining a monster secretly eating them. In 2010, Pang adapted A Nail Clipper Romance as one of the four segments of the horror anthology film 4+1 Project, where he also served as producer, while Derek Tsang and Jimmy Wan directed. This segment was a 40-minute short film featuring Zhou Xun and Lawrence Chou in lead roles, and both the novella and the short film end with an open ending. Following positive reviews, Pang aimed to adapt the story into a feature film, expanding the plot beyond the original open ending. He invited his frequent collaborator and cinematographer Jason Kwan to direct the project, marking Kwan's directorial debut. Casting choices included actors from China, Taiwan, and Hong Kong, a decision based on the actual demographics of Chinese Hawaiians to enhance the characters' authenticity.

The project was officially announced in January 2014, and was presented at the Asia Film Financing Forum in March 2014, with Kwan announced as the director and Subi Liang as co-producer, raising a production budget of HK$4.9 million, including HK$3 million from Making Film Productions. Bravo Pictures acquired the distribution rights in May 2015. In March 2016, a teaser was released, along with the announcement of Zhou Dongyu and Joseph Chang as the lead cast. In November, Zhou revealed that she had invited Tiffany Ann Hsu, the girlfriend of her The Unbearable Lightness of Inspector Fan co-star Ethan Juan, to make a cameo appearance. In February 2017, an official trailer and poster were released, along with the announcement of the release date in China, and Evonne Sie and Ekin Cheng were revealed to be part of the cast. Cheng agreed to make a cameo appearance after learning that the film would be shot in Hawaii. He delivered his lines entirely in Cantonese, as Kwan noted that the crew wanted the actors to perform in their native languages for a more natural delivery, and Pang found that many Chinese Hawaiians are also native Cantonese speakers. A behind-the-scenes compilation was released on 8 March, followed by a promotional press conference held in Beijing on 21 March.

=== Filming ===
Principal photography took place in late 2014, with the entire shoot taking place on Oahu, Hawaii, primarily around Honolulu. Kwan noted that he chose to film in Hawaii because of its large Chinese population, yet very few Chinese-language films had been made there before, describing the decision as "a refreshing experience" for the audience. Zhou Dongyu, along with the film's producer, Pang Ho-cheung, learned surfing during the shoot in Hawaii to prepare for her role. Filming wrapped up before March 2015, and was reportedly in post-production by May 2015.

=== Music ===
The film featured Richie Jen's 1998 single "A Sad Pacific" as its theme song, which was rearranged and covered by Taiwanese singer Jiro Wang. Aska Yang's song "Onion" was also included in the film.

== Release ==
A Nail Clipper Romance was originally set to have its world premiere in competition for the Grand Prix at the 11th Osaka Asian Film Festival in March 2016, but the production team withdrew from the lineup on 18 February. The film premiered at Kowloonbay International Trade & Exhibition Centre, Kowloon Bay, Hong Kong on 10 April 2017, followed by a screening at the 7th Beijing International Film Festival on 11 April, and was released theatrically in both Hong Kong and China on 14 April.

== Reception ==
=== Box office ===
A Nail Clipper Romance grossed RMB$710,000 in the opening weekend, and concluded its theatrical run with RMB$4.49 million.

=== Critical response ===
Edmund Lee of South China Morning Post gave A Nail Clipper Romance 3.5/5 stars, describing it as a "bittersweet and sometimes ridiculous romantic fable" that skillfully balances fantasy and reality and praising the charming performances of both the leads and the supporting cast while exploring the complexities of love and trust. Lee also ranked the film eighth out of the 45 Hong Kong films theatrically released in 2017. Wong Wing-leung, writing for CommonWealth Magazine, appreciated the film as a refreshing departure from typical Chinese-Hong Kong co-productions, highlighting its unique storytelling that effectively explores themes of love and trust without relying on local elements or clichés, while also commending Jason Kwan's pragmatic approach that avoids the plot deficiencies often found in Pang Ho-cheung's films, ultimately delivering a compelling and thought-provoking narrative that transcends traditional boundaries.

Cheung Shan-tei of Hong Kong Economic Times also gave the film 3.5/5 stars and described the film as a quirky yet thought-provoking exploration of the complexities of love and trust through its absurd premise of "nail clipper monsters", while it effectively combines humor and animation, the chemistry between the leads feels lacking, which ultimately diminishes the impact of the darker themes. Lau Ying-tsz of HK01 regarded the film as a thought-provoking exploration of love, emphasizing the infusion of fresh romantic elements with an absurd premise that creates a distinctly chaotic vibe. Siu Yu of am730 described the film as a "love story of youngsters", vibrantly portraying youthful love filled with dreams and fantasies, though he noted that the leads, Joseph Chang and Zhou Dongyu, fell into stereotypical roles and their performances were not as captivating as Zhou Xun's in the 2010 version, yet the story's unique themes about trust in relationships are still effectively conveyed.

== Awards and nominations ==
Year	Award	Category	Nominee	Result	Ref.
2018	9th Golden Broom Awards	Most Disappointing Film	—N/a	Nominated	
