= Heritage: The Young Concubine =

Heritage: The Young Concubine (歲月河山：我家的女人) is a 1980 Hong Kong TV drama by RTHK starring Leslie Cheung. It was directed by David King, Wong Chi and Wong King Keung. Written by Lilian Lee. Runtime: 92 minutes.

== Synopsis ==
The story takes place in the New Territories in the 1920s. Leslie Cheung is a student who returns to his home village and becomes embroiled in a love affair with his father's concubine.

== Cast ==
- Leslie Cheung
- Hon Kong
- Hui Ying Ying
- Law Kar Ying
- Law Keung
- Lee Pang Fei
- Lo Hung

== Awards ==
- 16th Chicago International Film Festival
- First Commonwealth Film and Television Festival
