= Villain hitting =

Folk sorcery practice in China and Hong Kong

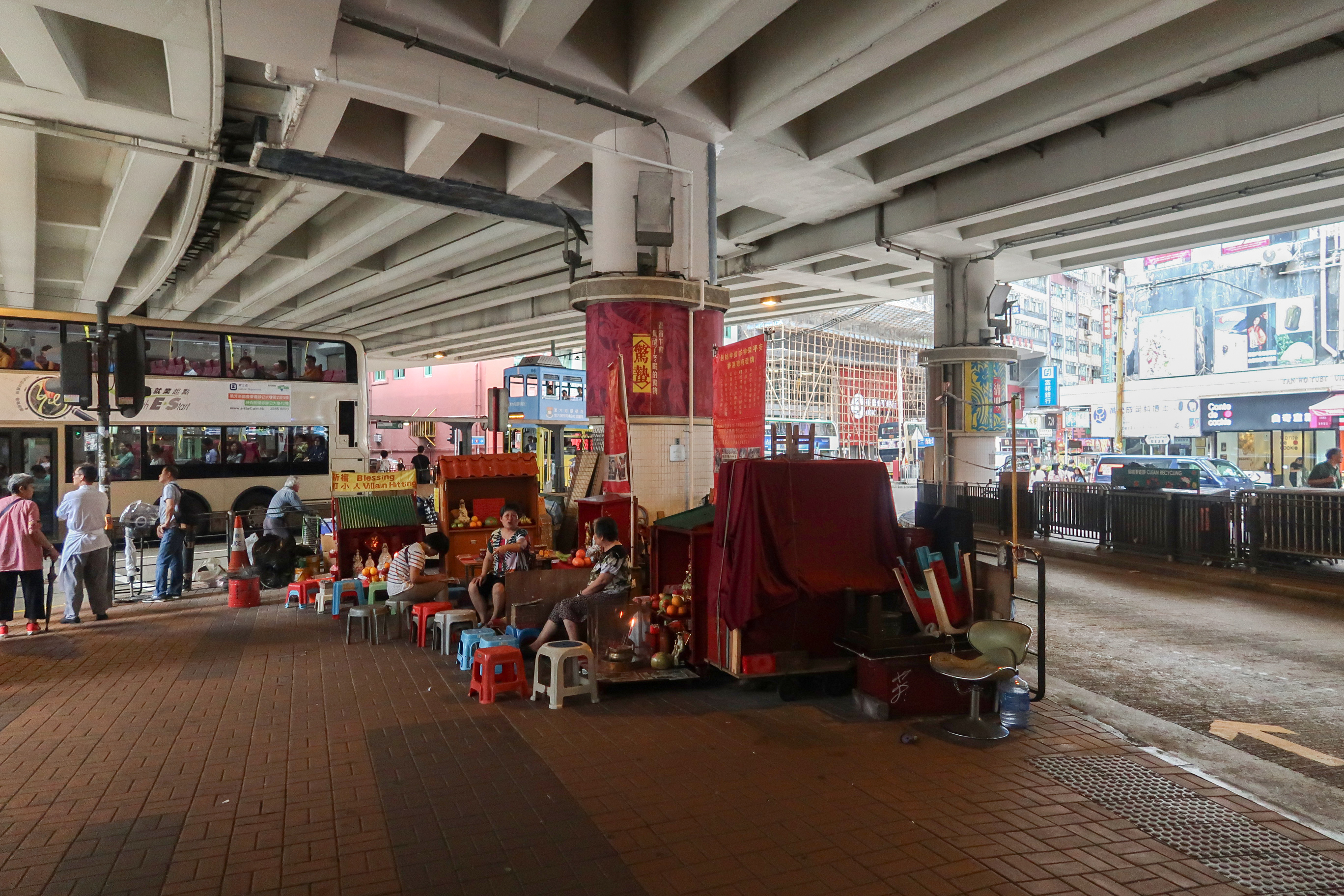
- A villain hitter and her client under the Canal Road Flyover in Hong Kong
- Chinese: 打小人
- Literal meaning: striking little people
Transcriptions
Standard Mandarin
- Hanyu Pinyin: dǎ xiǎorén
Yue: Cantonese
- Yale Romanization: dá síu yàhn
- Jyutping: daa2 siu2 jan4

Villain hitting, also known as da siu yan (Chinese: 打小人), demon exorcising, or petty person beating, is a form of folk sorcery practiced in the Guangdong region of China and in Hong Kong, particularly within Cantonese communities. The ritual is intended to symbolically curse, drive away, or otherwise neutralize one’s enemies through the targeted application of magic—usually by striking paper effigies representing the offending party with a shoe.

In contemporary practice, villain hitting is often regarded as a modest, quasi-informal occupation typically performed by elderly women in roadside or underpass shrines, although commercial "DIY" kits are also available for the self-motivated. The practice has been preliminarily included on Hong Kong’s list of "intangible cultural heritage" by the Home Affairs Bureau, and was selected as the "Best Way to Get It Off Your Chest" in TIME magazine’s 2009 "Best of Asia" feature.

== Background ==
In the ritual context, a "villain" (小人) may refer either to a specific individual—such as a personal rival, workplace adversary, or occasionally a widely disliked public figure—or to a general category of persons perceived as potentially harmful to the client’s well-being or fortunes.

Traditional Chinese cosmology, which incorporates elements of dualism, frequently frames human relationships in terms of opposing forces. The conceptual pairing of Villains (小人) and Gui Ren (貴人; benefactors who may assist the client) is often interpreted through a broader yin and yang worldview.

The timing of villain hitting ceremonies varies, but the Jingzhe solar term is widely considered the most auspicious date for performing the ritual. In traditional folklore, Jingzhe marks the awakening of hibernating creatures by spring thunder; by extension, malevolent forces—including the mythical baihu (White Tiger) and human villains—are also believed to become active. Conducting the ritual on this date is therefore thought to provide pre-emptive protection against interpersonal misfortune.

Villain hitting is often conducted in liminal or transitional spaces such as beneath overpasses or flyovers. In Hong Kong, the Canal Road Flyover between Causeway Bay and Wan Chai is a well-known site for the practice, particularly during Jingzhe.

== History ==
The origins of villain hitting are commonly traced to agricultural customs in the Guangdong region. According to the traditional Chinese calendar, the year is divided into twenty-four solar terms, one of which—spring’s "Awakening of Insects"—signals the return of animal activity after winter dormancy.

To prevent attacks from the feared White Tiger, farmers historically offered ritual sacrifices by smearing pig’s blood on paper tiger effigies as a form of symbolic feeding. Over time, the role of the White Tiger as a dangerous external threat was gradually replaced by that of the socially disruptive "villain," who became the primary target of ritualized exorcism and symbolic punishment.

== Ceremony ==
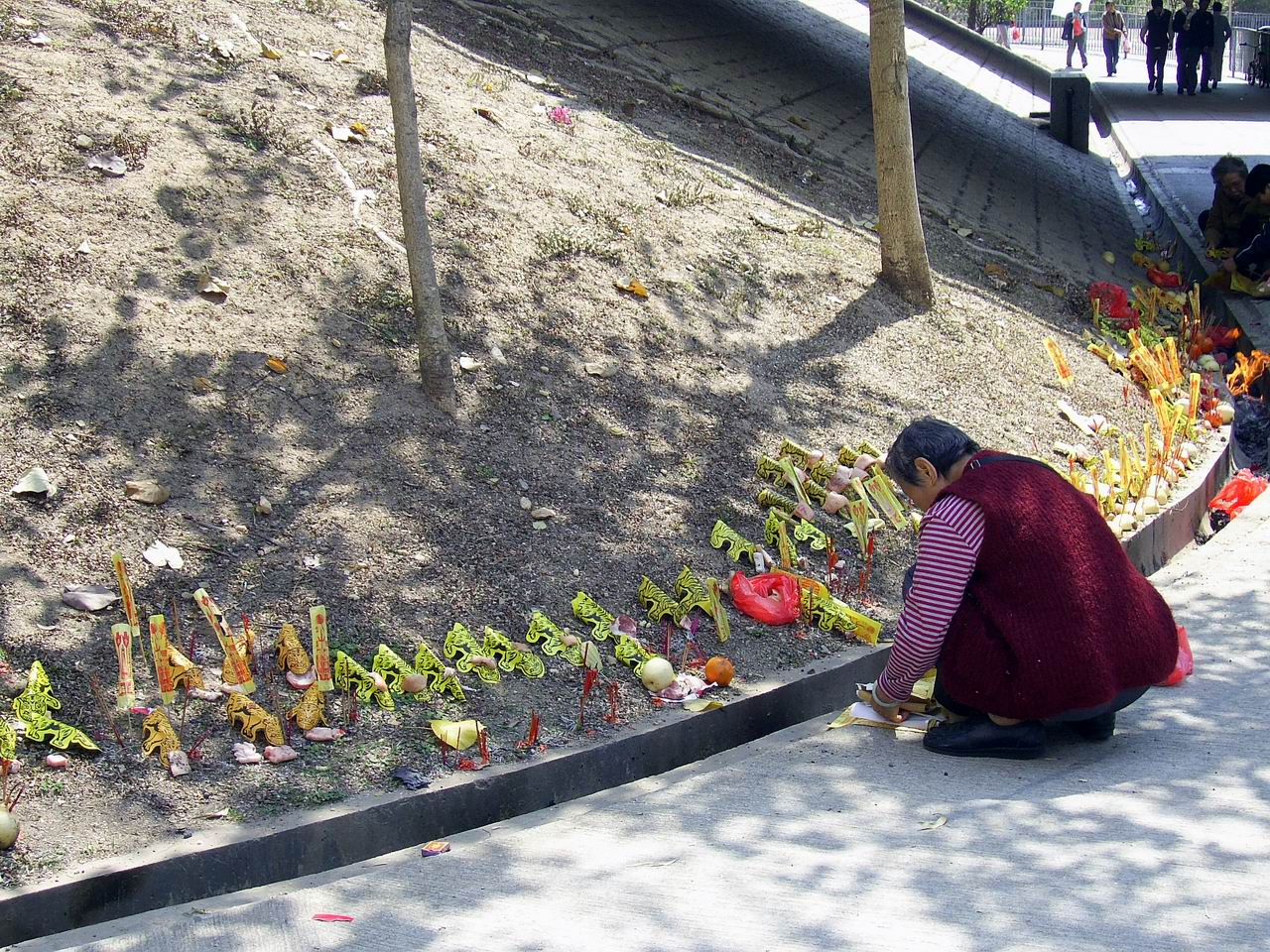
Sacrifice to Baihu

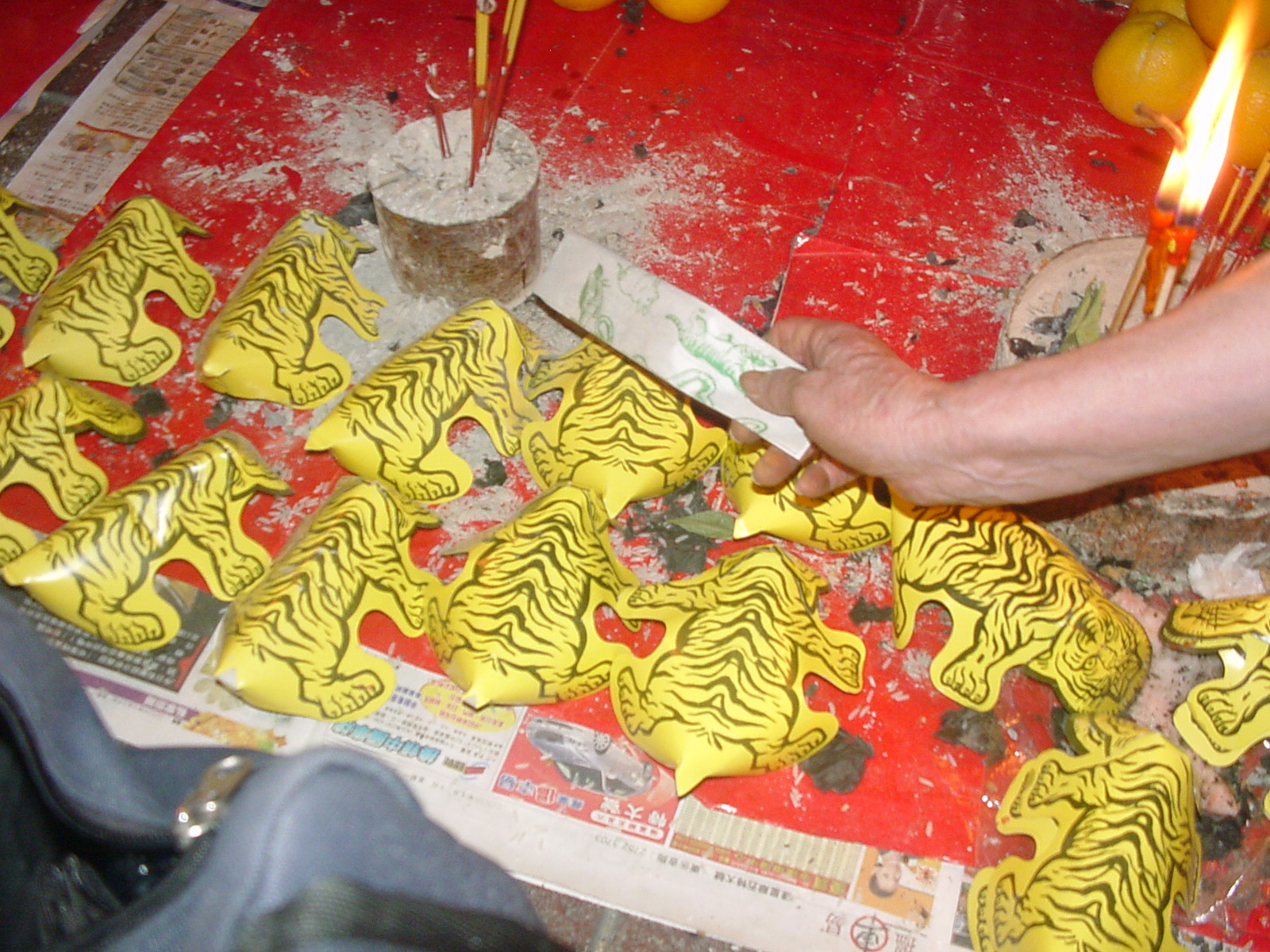
Paper tigers used in villain hitting

Upon receiving a client’s request, the villain hitter prepares human-shaped paper effigies, sometimes incorporating identifying details of the intended target. The effigy is then ritually struck—most commonly with a shoe—during a ceremony typically divided into eight stages:

1. Sacrifice to divinities (奉神): Deities are worshipped using incense and candle offerings.
2. Report (稟告): The client’s name and date of birth are written on a Fulu (符籙). If a specific villain is targeted, identifying details such as name, birth date, photograph, or clothing may be affixed to the effigy.
3. Villain hitting (打小人): The effigy is struck using symbolic implements such as shoes or incense sticks. Variants of the effigy may include representations of men, women, or the "five ghosts."
4. Sacrifice to Baihu (祭白虎): Particularly on Jingzhe, a yellow paper tiger representing Baihu is ritually fed pork soaked in pig’s blood. In some traditions, its mouth is also smeared with fatty meat to ensure it remains too well-fed to cause further harm. The paper tiger may subsequently be burned or decapitated.
5. Reconciliation (化解)
6. Pray for blessings (祈福): A red Gui Ren paper is used to invoke assistance from benefactors.
7. Treasure Burning (進寶): Paper offerings representing wealth are burned for the spirits.
8. Zhi Jiao (擲筊), or "cup hitting" (打杯): Two crescent-shaped wooden blocks are cast to determine whether the ritual has been successfully completed.

== See also ==
- Lingnan culture
- Chinese spiritual world concepts
