= PG Love =

2016 Rom-Com Hong Kong-Chinese film

- Starring: Angie Shum; Jacqueline Chong; Anita Chui; Jumbo Tsang; Bella Law; Alycia Chan
- Release date: 2016
- Running time: 98 minutes
- Country: Hong Kong
- Language: Cantonese

PG Love is a 2016 Hong Kong romantic comedy film starring Jennifer Shum, Jacquelin Chong, Jennifer Choi, Tsang Suk-nga, Law Choi-ling, Chan Yuen-hang, and Ma Chi-wai, and directed by Choi Kit-ling.

== Story synopsis ==
Several girls from different backgrounds and experiences embark on different life paths because of their work as promotion girls (PGs). Vicky and Sammy are college classmates who hope to attract attention online through their PG work and break into the modeling world, shamelessly showing off their figures to gain attention...

== Cast ==
- Cen Rijia
- Zhuang Simin
- Cui Biga
- Zeng Shuya
- Luo Cailing
- Chen Wanheng
- Lin Shengbin
- Zhao Jinhao
- Ma Zhiwei
- Lu Junguang
- Shao Yinyin
- Chen Jiahuan
- Hu Weikang
- Zou Wenzheng
- Zhuang Siming
- Yang Shimin
- Chen Jiajia
- Chen Yuxi
- Lu Yong
- C Jun

== Theme song ==
The theme song of this movie, "Fairy Aura," is sung by Cen Rijia.
