= Chasing the Dragon II: Wild Wild Bunch =

2019 Hong Kong film by Wong Jing and Jason Kwan

- Film poster

Chinese name
- Traditional Chinese: 追龍II：賊王
- Simplified Chinese: 追龙II：贼王
Transcriptions
Standard Mandarin
- Hanyu Pinyin: Zhuī Lóng: Zéi wáng
Yue: Cantonese
- Jyutping: Zeoi1 Lung4 Ji6: Caak6 Wong4
- Directed by: Wong Jing; Jason Kwan
- Written by: Wong Jing; Philip Lui
- Produced by: Wong Jing
- Starring: Tony Leung; Louis Koo; Gordon Lam; Simon Yam
- Cinematography: Jason Kwan; Jimmy Kwok
- Edited by: Li Ka-wing; Sin Man-chiu
- Music by: Day Tai
- Production companies: Mega-Vision Project Workshop; Bona Film Group Company; Alibaba Pictures; Television Broadcasts Limited; Wanda Media; Sun Entertainment Culture; Sil-Metropole Organisation
- Distributed by: Intercontinental Film Distributors (HK)
- Release date: 6 June 2019
- Running time: 103 minutes
- Countries: Hong Kong; China
- Language: Cantonese
- Box office: US$45.7 million

Chasing the Dragon II: Wild Wild Bunch, previously known as Master of Ransom, is a 2019 Hong Kong crime action film directed by Wong Jing and Jason Kwan, starring Tony Leung, Louis Koo and Gordon Lam, with Simon Yam making a special appearance. The film is a standalone sequel to the 2017 film, Chasing the Dragon, and features a new storyline and new characters.

== Plot ==
Before 1997, criminal genius Logan Lung (Tony Leung Ka-fai) savages Hong Kong with a series of notorious kidnaps. He abducts the first sons of Hong Kong regals, Li and Lui, ransoming over HK$2 billion. In fear of the offenders avenging, the subjects promise not to report to the police after ransoming the hostages, hence letting Logan and his team evade justice.

The police forces of Hong Kong and the mainland are highly concerned with Logan's case and send Sky Ho (Louis Koo), a Hong Kong undercover agent, to infiltrate Logan's gang. After various challenges, Sky manages to get close to Logan and quietly awaits the opportune moment to take action. However, Logan is cautious and cunning. Since no one has reported his crimes, the police cannot arrest him until he makes his next move.

After numerous probing attempts, Sky finally unveils the identity of Logan's next kidnap target. Sky believes he has already gained Logan's trust, hence secretly contacts the police to plan their next move, only to realise it is just another test by Logan.

Logan then evades the police. They end up at an overhead bridge, where Logan is captured. Sky resigns and Logan gets executed.

== Cast ==
- Tony Leung Ka-fai as Logan Lung (龍志強; based on Cheung Tze-keung)
- Louis Koo as Sky Ho (何天)
- Gordon Lam as Doc (博士)
- Sabrina Qiu as Bunny (兔兔)
- Sherman Ye as Farrell Lung (龍志飛)
- Willie Wai as Chu-kot (諸葛)
- Phat Chan as Genie (嫦娥)
- Jason Wong as Fiery (火爆)
- Lukian Wang as Luna (嫦娥)
- Simon Yam as Lee Keung (李強; special appearance)
- Du Jiang as Captain Zhou (周隊長; special appearance)
- Candice Yu as Rebecca (guest appearance)
- Michael Wong as Stanford Ho (賀不凡; based on Stanley Ho)
- Angie Cheung as Stanford's concubine
- Natalie Meng as Stanford's concubine
- Connie Man as Doc's wife
- Chun Wong as Ma Hung-tang (馬空騰)
- Dominic Ho Ho Ka-wai (賀家偉)
- Rainbow Ching as Sky's mother
- Law Wing-cheung as Kau (阿九)

== Release ==
Chasing the Dragon II: Wild Wild Bunch was theatrically released on 6 June 2019. On 28 April 2019, the film held its first press conference in Beijing.

== Box office ==
Chasing the Dragon: Wild Wild Bunch grossed a total of US$45,733,356, combining its box office gross from Hong Kong, China, the United States, Australia and New Zealand.

In Hong Kong, the film grossed a total of HK$9,152,244 during its theatrical run from 6 June to 10 July 2019, making it the 10th highest-grossing domestic film of the territory in 2019.

In China, the film grossed a total of ¥309,310,000 at the box office.
