= I Love Maria =

1988 Hong Kong film by David Chung

- Promotional release poster
- Traditional Chinese: 鐵甲無敵瑪利亞
- Simplified Chinese: 铁甲无敌玛利亚
- Hanyu Pinyin: Tiě Jiǎ Wú Dí Mǎ Lì Yǎ
- Jyutping: Tit3 Gaap3 Mou4 Dik6 Maa5 Lei6 Ngaa3
- Directed by: David Chung
- Screenplay by: Yuen Kai Chi
- Produced by: Tsui Hark; John Shum
- Starring: John Shum; Sally Yeh; Tsui Hark; Tony Leung; Lam Ching-ying
- Cinematography: Law Wan Shing
- Edited by: David Wu
- Music by: James Wong; Romeo Diaz; David Wu
- Production companies: Film Workshop; Golden Princess Film Production
- Distributed by: Golden Princess Film Production
- Release date: 10 March 1988
- Running time: 96 minutes
- Country: Hong Kong
- Language: Cantonese
- Box office: HK$5,259,522

I Love Maria (also known as Roboforce) is a 1988 Hong Kong science fiction film directed by David Chung, produced by Tsui Hark and John Shum, and starring Hark and Shum alongside Sally Yeh, Tony Leung, and Lam Ching-ying.

== Plot ==
On one evening, Hong Kong's largest gang, the Hero Gang, uses an armed robot named Pioneer I to rob a bank and the police was unable to stop it. Maria is a loyal member to the Hero Gang and its leader and did not hesitate to kill the mechanical maintenance staff who tried to escape. Master, an elder member of the gang was dissatisfied with Maria's style of cold-blooded killing. Maria later discovers that the leader is obsessed with robots and he created a female armed robot named Pioneer II, which was modeled after Maria's face. This leads Maria to develop a strong hatred towards Pioneer II.

Reporter Chong Chi Keung was fired because he was unable to photograph Pioneer I during the bank robbery. Curly, who works at the Research Department of the police force, invents a cannon that may be able to fight robots, which attracts jealousy from his superior. Whiskey, a young member of the Hero Gang, feels dissatisfied about the gang's development and resigns. Later, Whiskey meets and befriends Curly at a bar and he is suspected to have betrayed the gang and the Hero Gang sends Pioneer II to kill him. While chasing Whiskey, Pioneer II malfunctions and is taken away by Whiskey (who has a secret crush on Maria) and Curly. Afterwards, Curly was wanted by the police for suspected collision with the Hero Gang.

Curly and Whiskey flees with the malfunctioned Pioneer II to a shack where Curly repairs its vanguard and reprogrammed it so that would only obey his commands, which also inadvertently causes it to produce human responses. Maria then brings Pioneer I to the shack to kill Whiskey. Curly commands Pioneer II to attack Pioneer I but the latter was armed with a "Counteract Bullets Device" making the former's attack ineffective. At this time, Master comes in masked and helps Whiskey and Curly escape the gang and flee to s shipyard. Reporter Chong also tracks them to the shipyard and performs a comedy skit with Pioneer II, who is gradually developing more human reactions. Chong then informs the police and Curly and Whiskey were arrested while Pioneer II fell into the hands of the Hero Gang again to be reprogrammed.

Later, Chong begins to sympathize for Curly and Whiskey and sneaks into the base of the Hero Gang. With the hep of Master, Chong was able to escape with Pioneer II from there while Master gets into a fight. Master, who raised every member of the gang from childhood, was dissatisfied with the gang's recent development and wants to terminate the leader's plan to create robots. When he was fighting with the leader, Master discovers that he himself has been made into a robot by the leader. Master soon lost the fight and was captured.

Chong gets Pioneer II to help Curly and Whiskey to escape from prison where afterwards, the four of them bring Curly's cannons to confront the Hero Gang at its base. Pioneer II fights the gang, Curly and Whiskey installs cannons around the base and Chong goes to save the soon-to-be executed Master. After defeating the gang, however, Pioneer II was captured by Pioneer I and Curly and Whiskey were suppressed by Maria and were unable to fire the cannons. At this time, Whiskey knocks down Maria to save Pioneer II and Pioneer II also ignores her own safety and shoots a cannon near herself and Pioneer I and destroys the robot it while saving Curly and Whiskey. The leader wants to activate the giant robot Pioneer III: The Ultimate Pioneer and escape. As the leader enters the navigation space of the robot, he was kicked off by Chong and Master whom had earlier sneaked in. Master and the leader fight on top of the robot's shoulder where Master uses the robots' giant joint to defeat the leader. Chong, however, mishandled the robot and flew up in the air but fortunately, Chong and Master successfully jumped out. The leader falls to his death from the roof and Maria also jumps off to die with him.

In the end, Curly, Whiskey and the now anthropomorphic Pioneer II lead a happy lives together while Chong dashingly abandons the pictures he took.

== Cast ==
- John Shum as Curly
- Sally Yeh as Maria / Pioneer II
- Tsui Hark as Whiskey
- Tony Leung Chiu-Wai as Chong Chi Keung
- Lam Ching-ying as Master
- Paul Chun as Police Captain
- Ben Lam as Hero Gang leader
- Dennis Chan as CEO of Secret Police Research Department
- Cho Yin Ling as Policewoman
- Benz Kong as Police Sergeant
- Pomson Shi as AB
- David Wu as Vice Captain
- Kirk Wong as Bartender
- Yip Chung Ping
- Ankee Leung
- Chiu Kwok Chi as Bar bully
- Steve Mak as Bar bully
- Chow Kong as Bar bully
- Lam Foo Wai as Bar bully
- William Leung as Bar bully
- Sin Ho Ying as Hero Gang's member
- Chang Sing Kwong as Hero Gang's member
- Cho Wing as Hero Gang's member
- Lau Shung Fung as Hero Gang's member
- Lee Chuen Hau as Hero Gang's member
- Ng Kwok Kin as Policeman
- To Wai Wo as Policeman
- John Woo as Police officer at end credits (cameo)
- Yat Boon-Chai as Police officer at end credits
- Teddy Chan
- Ernest Mauser as Hero Gang's engineer
- Lee Wah Kon as Hero Gang's engineer

== Reception ==
=== Box office ===
The film grossed HK$5,259,522 at the Hong Kong box office during its theatrical run from 10 to 16 March 1988 in Hong Kong.

=== Critical response ===
James Mudge of Beyond Hollywood called the film "a wonderfully creative and imaginative affair", as well as "hugely enjoyable and a film not to be missed by any aficionados of far out cinema."
