= Sing girls =

Term for actresses starring alongside Stephen Chow

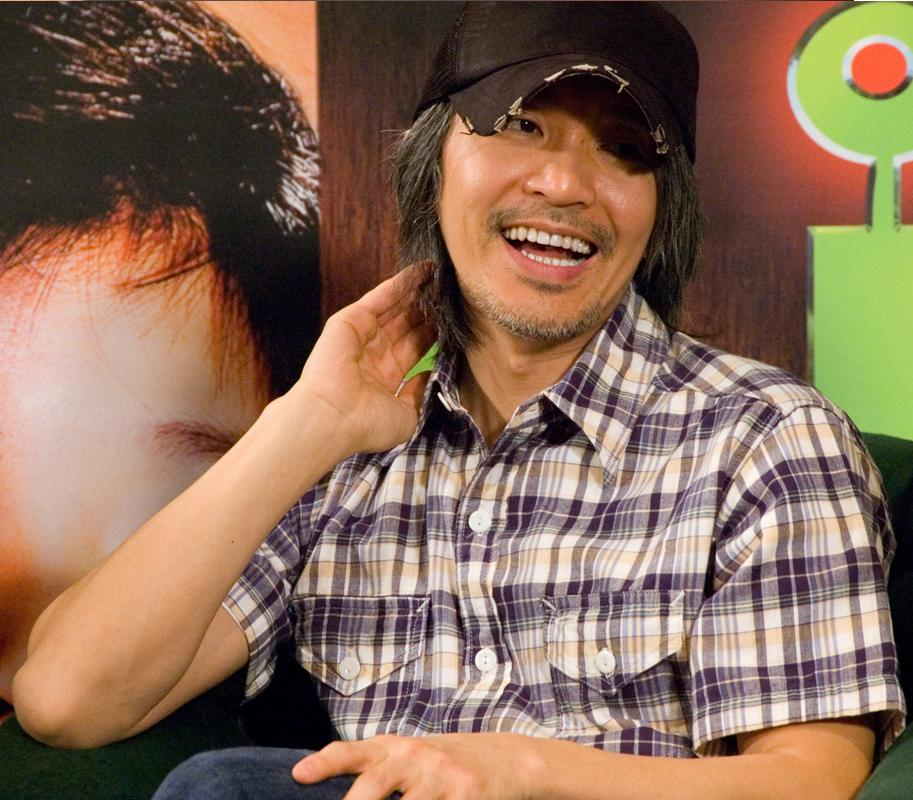
Actresses who have starred alongside Stephen Chow are often known as "Sing girls".

"Sing girls" (Chinese: 星女郎; Jyutping: Sing1 neoi5 long4; pinyin: Xīng nǚláng) is a nickname for actresses who starred alongside Stephen Chow or starred in Stephen Chow's movies, often as the main character's romantic interest.

== Introduction ==
Many "Sing girls"are young, new actresses who go on to receive considerable media attention after appearing in one of Chow's films, and their success is often attributed to the attention brought to them by Chow—Zhang Yuqi, for example, has been referred to as Chow's "protégée" after appearing in the 2007 film CJ7. The Chinese word 星 (Sing1, Xīng) refers both to Chow's nickname 星爷 (Sing Yeh, "Grandmaster Sing") and to 明星 (ming4 sing1; míngxīng), the word for a star or celebrity.

Chow has not always chosen newcomer actresses to co-star with him; for example, Vicki Zhao already had a successful music and film career when she appeared as the female lead in Shaolin Soccer, and Gong Li was already famous as an "Yimou girl" (谋女郎) for her frequent collaboration with director Zhang Yimou before she starred in two Stephen Chow films in the early 1990s. Many times, though, starring with Chow has been a "Sing girl"'s first major role and has kick-started her career, as King of Comedy did for Cecilia Cheung. Eva Huang and Zhang Yuqi both gained considerable attention from media and netizens after appearing in Kung Fu Hustle and CJ7, respectively, even though their roles were relatively small.

Kingdom Yuen appeared in numerous 1990s Stephen Chow films not as a lead female or romantic interest, but rather in minor roles as a comedic stock character.

The youngest "Sing girl" is 7-year-old Zhang Yuwen, who appears in Journey to the West: Conquering the Demons.

== List ==
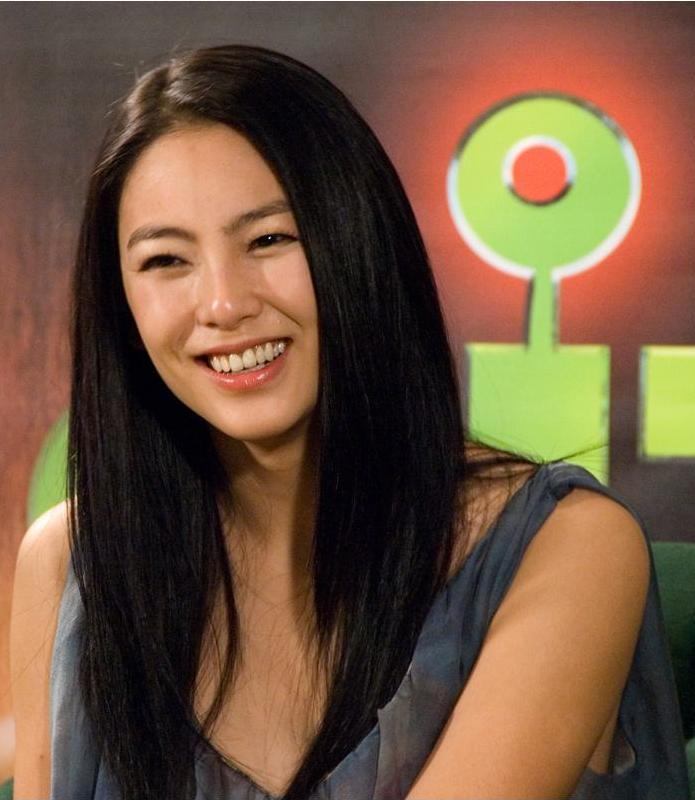
Zhang Yuqi became a well-known celebrity after appearing in with Chow in CJ7.

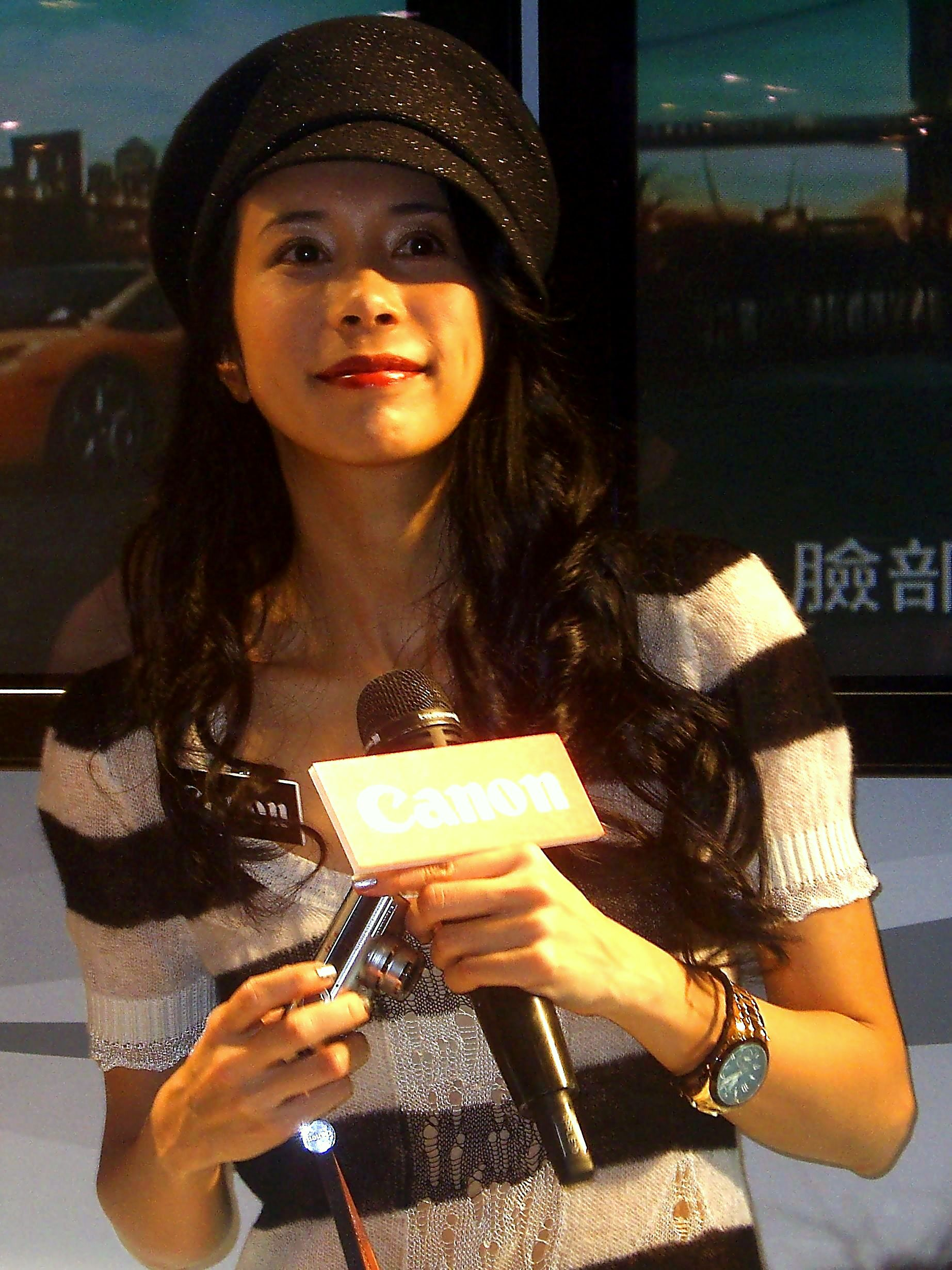
Karen Mok has appeared in five Stephen Chow films.

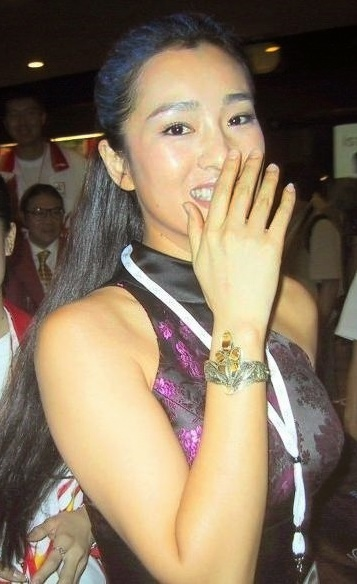
While most famous for her collaboration with Zhang Yimou, Gong Li has also starred in two films with Chow.

Sing girls
Name	First appeared with Chow in	Other films with Chow
Sandra Ng	My Father's Son (TV series, 1988)	Thunder Cops II (1989), Love Is Love (1990), All for the Winner (1990), When Fortune Smiles (1990), The Magnificent Scoundrels (1991), God of Gamblers III: Back to Shanghai (1991), All's Well, Ends Well (1992), Royal Tramp (1992), Royal Tramp II (1992),The Lucky Guy (1998), The Tricky Master (1999)
Sharla Cheung	Faithfully Yours (1988)	All for the Winner (1990), God of Gamblers II (1991), God of Gamblers III: Back to Shanghai (1991)**, Fist of Fury 1991 (1991), Fist of Fury 1991 II (1991), Fight Back to School (1991), Fight Back to School II (1992), Royal Tramp (1992), Royal Tramp II (1992), Fight Back to School III (1993), King of Beggars (1992), Hail the Judge (1994)
Jacqueline Law	The Final Combat (TV series, 1989)	
Yammie Lam	The Final Combat (TV series, 1989)	Flirting Scholar (1993), A Chinese Odyssey (1994)
Teresa Mo	The Justice of Life (TV series, 1989)	Legend of the Dragon (1990), Magnificent Scoundrels (1991), All's Well, Ends Well (1992)
Ann Bridgewater	Thunder Cops II (1989)	My Hero (1990), Curry and Pepper (1990)
Nina Li Chi	Dragon Fight (1989)	
Vivian Chow	The Unmatchable Match (1989)	
Sibelle Hu	Sleazy Dizzy (1990)	
Vivian Chen	Look Out, Officer! (1990)	Royal Tramp (1992), Royal Tramp II (1992)
Monica Chan	God of Gamblers II (1991)	
Kingdom Yuen	Fight Back to School (1991)	Justice, My Foot! (1992), King of Beggars (1992), Flirting Scholar (1993), The Mad Monk (1993), Forbidden City Cop (1996), God of Cookery (1996), The Tricky Master (1999)
Gong Li	God of Gamblers III: Back to Shanghai (1991)	Flirting Scholar (1993)
Chingmy Yau	Tricky Brains (1991)	Royal Tramp (1992), Royal Tramp II (1992), Lawyer Lawyer (1997)
Rosamund Kwan	Tricky Brains (1991)	
Athena Chu	Fight Back to School II* (1992)	A Chinese Odyssey (1994)
Anita Mui	Justice, My Foot! (1992)	The Top Bet (1991), Fight Back to School III (1993), The Mad Monk (1993)
Brigitte Lin	Royal Tramp (1992)	Royal Tramp II (1992)
Michelle Reis	Royal Tramp II (1992)	
Maggie Cheung	All's Well, Ends Well (1992)	The Mad Monk (1993)
Kathy Chow	Fight Back to School III (1993)	
Christy Chung	Love on Delivery (1994)	Hail the Judge (1994), God of Cookery** (1996), All's Well, Ends Well 1997 (1997)
Ada Choi	Hail the Judge (1994)	A Chinese Odyssey (1994)
Karen Mok	A Chinese Odyssey (1994)	Out of the Dark (1995), God of Cookery (1996), Lawyer Lawyer (1997), King of Comedy (1999), Shaolin Soccer** (2001)
Anita Yuen	From Beijing With Love (1994)	
Gigi Leung	Sixty Million Dollar Man (1995)	
Carina Lau	Forbidden City Cop (1996)	
Carmen Lee	Forbidden City Cop (1996)	
Gigi Lai	All's Well, Ends Well 1997	
Christine Ng	All's Well, Ends Well 1997	
Jacklyn Wu	All's Well, Ends Well 1997	
Sammi Cheng	The Lucky Guy (1998)	
Kristy Yang	The Lucky Guy (1998)	
Shu Qi	The Lucky Guy (1998)	Journey to the West: Conquering the Demons*** (2013)
Cecilia Cheung	King of Comedy* (1999)	Shaolin Soccer** (2001)
Vicki Zhao	Shaolin Soccer (2001)	
Eva Huang	Kung Fu Hustle* (2004)	
Kitty Zhang	CJ7* (2007)	Shaolin Girl*** (2008), The Mermaid*** (2016)
Xu Jiao	CJ7* (2007)	
Lin Yun	The Mermaid* (2016)	Journey to the West: The Demons Strike Back (2017)***
E Jingwen	The New King of Comedy*** (2019)	
*Film debut **Minor appearance only ***Film produced or directed, but not acted in, by Chow

== See also ==
- Rat Pack, Brat Pack, and Frat Pack: American actors grouped together through frequent collaboration
- Bond girl
- Yimou girl
- Cinema of Hong Kong
- Cinema of China
