= Flirting Scholar 2 =

- Hong Kong Theatrical poster
- Directed by: Lee Lik-Chi
- Written by: Tsang Kan-cheung; Chan Man-keung
- Produced by: Jimmy Heung
- Starring: Huang Xiaoming; Zhang Jingchu; Natalis Chan; Richie Ren; Zhou Libo; Kingdom Yuen; Mimi Chu; Louis Fan; Cheung Tat-ming; Law Kar-ying
- Cinematography: Poon Hang Sang; Lai Yiu-fai; Keung Kwok-Man
- Edited by: Cheung Ka-fai
- Music by: Raymond Wong
- Production company: Win's Entertainment
- Release dates: 8 July 2010 (Hong Kong); 9 July 2010 (China)
- Running time: 102 minutes
- Country: China
- Language: Mandarin

Flirting Scholar 2 (simplified Chinese: 唐伯虎点秋香2之四大才子; traditional Chinese: 唐伯虎點秋香2之四大才子; pinyin: Táng Bóhǔ diǎn Qiūxiāng èr zhi Sì Dà Cáizǐ; Jyutping: tong4 baak3 fu2 dim2 cau1 heong1 ji6 zi1 sei3 daai6 coi4 zi2) is a 2010 Chinese comedy film directed by Hong Kong director Lee Lik-Chi and starring Huang Xiaoming, Zhang Jingchu, Natalis Chan, Zhou Libo and Richie Ren. It is a prequel to the 1993 Hong Kong film Flirting Scholar, which starred Stephen Chow and was also directed by Lee.

== Cast ==
- Huang Xiaoming as Tang Bohu
- Zhang Jingchu as Qiu Xiang
- Natalis Chan as Chuk Chi Shan
- Cheng Pei-pei as Madame Wah
- Kingdom Yuen as Shek Lau
- Mimi Chu as Chussy
