= Lu Shuming =

Chinese actor (1956–2022)

- 陆树铭
- Born: 15 August 1956; Qingdao, Shandong, China
- Died: 1 November 2022 (aged 66); Xi'an, Shaanxi, China
- Occupation: Actor
- Years active: 1983–2021
- Spouse: Gao Lan
- Children: 2

Chinese name
- Simplified Chinese: 陆树铭
- Traditional Chinese: 陸樹銘
Transcriptions
Standard Mandarin
- Hanyu Pinyin: Lù Shùmíng

Lu Shuming (Chinese: 陆树铭; 15 August 1956 – 1 November 2022) was a Chinese actor best known for his role as Guan Yu on the 1994 television series Romance of the Three Kingdoms, and also garnered recognition for his roles as Bull Demon King and Li Guang on A Chinese Odyssey (1995) and The Emperor in Han Dynasty (2005), respectively.

== Biography ==
Lu was born in Qingdao, Shandong, on 15 August 1956, while his ancestral home is in Yantai. Due to his father having participated in supporting the construction of the northwest China, they relocated to Weinan and then Xi'an in Shaanxi province, where he attended Xi'an Road Primary School and Jiefang Road Middle School. At school, he loved basketball and Beijing Opera.

Lu began his acting career in 1980, when he was accepted to Shaanxi Provincial Drama Troupe, but soon he was forced to leave the stage for falling in love with an actress.

In 1983, Lu was cast as Li Hu in Man in the Desert, making his television debut. In the same year, the Communist government began to crack down on people with "Bad Style" (作风不良). Lu was jailed for 16 months for "mental pollution" (精神污染), a "crime" originated from when he danced seven or eight times at his friend's uncle's house. He went on to appear in other works, including Sing a Romantic Song for You (1986), Exterminate the Banditi in Western Hunan (1986), and Bleak Youth (1988).

In 1989, he was cast as Qin Shi Huang in A Terra-Cotta Warrior, opposite Zhang Yimou and Gong Li.

Lu gained national fame for his starring role as Guan Yu in the 1994 television series Romance of the Three Kingdoms, adapted from Luo Guanzhong's classical novel of the same title.

He co-starred with Stephen Chow and Ng Man-tat in the 1995 film A Chinese Odyssey as Bull Demon King.

In 1997, he co-starred with Li Jingfei and Sun Yanjun in the historical television series Sun Wu as general Wu Zixu.

In 2005, he acted in the historical television series The Emperor in Han Dynasty, playing the role of general Li Guang. That same year, he starred with Du Yulu in The Rice is Ripe.

In 2019, he appeared in Battle Between Song and Liao Dynastles, a historical war film starring Siqin Gaowa.

Lu played a supporting role in the comedy film Stop! Thieves, starring Bruce Leung, Lawrence Ng and Rain Lee and directed by Jacky Zheng.

In 2021, he played the male lead role of Guan Yu in the historical war film Green Dragon Crescent Blade, alongside Kenny Kwan and Jin Song.

== Personal life and death ==
Lu married opera singer Gao Lan (高岚), with whom he had a son and a daughter.

On 1 November 2022, Lu died due to sudden illness in Xi'an, Shaanxi, at the age of 66.

== Filmography ==
=== Film ===
Year	English title	Chinese title	Role	Notes
1986	Exterminate the Banditi in Western Hunan	湘西剿匪记	Liu Dazhu	
1990	A Terra-Cotta Warrior	秦俑	Qin Shi Huang	
1995	A Chinese Odyssey	大话西游之月光宝盒	Bull Demon King	
2019	Battle Between Song and Liao Dynastles	大破天门阵	Mu Yu	
2020	Stop! Thieves	站住！小偷	Hu Jiuwan	
2021	Green Dragon Crescent Blade	青龙偃月刀	Guan Yu	
2021	Seven Doors	七扇门	Chang Lezu	

=== Television ===
Year	English title	Chinese title	Role	Notes
1983	Man in the Desert	大漠中的男人	Li Hu	
1983		未粉刷完的墙壁	Bicycle coach	
1986	Sing a Romantic Song for You	为君唱首风流歌	Road builder	
1994	Romance of the Three Kingdoms	三国演义	Guan Yu	
1997	Sun Wu	孙武	Wu Zixu	
2005	The Emperor in Han Dynasty	汉武大帝	Li Guang	
2005	The Rice is Ripe	谷穗黄了	Fan Tianbao	
2005	Fight Against Evil	阻击罪恶	An Ke	
2006	Grassland Sentiment	草原情		
2011	Strange Destiny of Fragrant Hills	香山奇缘	King Miaozhuang	
2015	The Legendary Broadsword	大刀记	Wang Shenghe	

=== Stages ===
Year	English title	Chinese title	Role	Notes
1988	Bleak Youth	苍凉青春	Erwanzi	
1989	Vortex in Spring Tide	大潮中的漩涡	Li Banzheng	
1999	In This Family	在这个家庭里	Master Huang	
1999	Xuanyuan Huangdi	轩辕黄帝	Emperor Huangdi	
2009	Zhong Kui	钟馗	Zhong Kui	

== Song ==
- A Pot of Old Wine (一壶老酒) (2015)

== Book ==
- 我遇关公 [I met Guan Gong] (in Chinese). Shanghai: Oriental Publishing House. 2016. ISBN 9787506083652.
