= Troublesome Night 3 =

1998 Hong Kong film by Herman Yau

- DVD cover

Chinese name
- Traditional Chinese: 陰陽路之升棺發財
- Simplified Chinese: 阴阳路之升棺发财
Transcriptions
Standard Mandarin
- Hanyu Pinyin: Yīn Yáng Lù Zhī Shēng Guān Fā Cái
Yue: Cantonese
- Jyutping: Jam1 Joeng4 Lou6 Zi1 Sing1 Gun1 Faat3 Coi4
- Directed by: Herman Yau
- Written by: Kenneth Lau; Chang Kwok-tse
- Produced by: Nam Yin
- Cinematography: Joe Chan
- Edited by: Chan Kei-hop
- Music by: Mak Chun Hung
- Production companies: Win's Entertainment Ltd. Nam Yin Production Co., Ltd.
- Distributed by: China Star Entertainment Group
- Release date: March 1998
- Running time: 99 minutes
- Country: Hong Kong
- Language: Cantonese
- Box office: HK$5,730,755

Troublesome Night 3 (Chinese: 陰陽路之升棺發財; lit. 'Yin Yang Road: Raising the Coffin to Make a Fortune') is a 1998 Hong Kong comedy horror film produced by Nam Yin and directed by Herman Yau. It is the third of the 20 films in the Troublesome Night film series.

== Plot ==
The film consists of three loosely connected segments based on the theme of a mortuary.

Shishedo, a mortician, is grief-stricken when his favourite singer, Lam Wing-si, is killed in an accident. Lam's face was badly marred so Shishedo takes her place in the coffin by disguising himself as the deceased singer. He disappears and leaves his colleagues to deal with the ghostly aftermath.

In the next segment, Gigi wants a memorial service for her mother, who had hanged herself. The ghost of Gigi's mother is displeased when the greedy morticians try to trick her daughter into using their services, so she haunts them.

The last segment involves Hung, a mortician, who commits suicide after her boyfriend dumps her because of her job. Her boyfriend faces retribution when her ghost returns to haunt him and he dies after being stabbed by muggers.

== Cast ==
- Louis Koo as Cheng Lik
- Vincent Kok as policeman
- Lee Kin-yan as Man
- Lee Lik-chi as Bill Chan
- Helen Poon as Mrs. Wong
- Simon Lui as Chan Tai-cheung
- Fennie Yuen as Hung
- Rain Lau as Ann
- Allen Ting as Shishedo
- Frankie Ng as Sun Kwai
- Emotion Cheung as Trump
- Chin Kar-lok as Rock
- Natalie Wong as Elaine
- Michael Tse as Daviv
- Wallis Pang as Beauty Chan's sister
- Shing Fui-On as loanshark
- Law Lan as Gigi's mother
- Christine Ng as Gigi Cheung
- Vicky Hung as Daviv's new girlfriend
- Oliveiro Lana as Beauty Chan
- Lo Mang
