= Law Kar-ying =

Hong Kong Cantonese opera singer

Dr Law Kar-ying BBS MH
- 羅家英
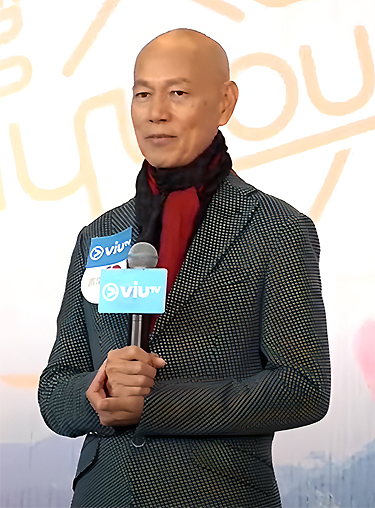
- Law at a press conference for the ViuTV variety show Taiwan Meimei in 2019.
- Born: Law Hang-tong; September 22, 1946 (age 80); Shunde, Guangdong, Republic of China
- Education: Northern State University
- Occupation: Actor
- Years active: 1970s–present
- Spouse: Liza Wang (m. 2009)
- Parents: Law Kar-kuen (father); Lee Ngan-guen (mother)
- Family: Law Yiu-tong (brother); Law Yau-tong (brother); Law Shiu-tong (brother); Law Sok-ching (sister)
- Awards: Hong Kong Film Awards – Best Supporting Actor; 1995 Summer Snow Golden Horse Awards – Best Supporting Actor; 1995 Summer Snow

Chinese name
- Traditional Chinese: 羅家英
- Simplified Chinese: 罗家英
Transcriptions
Standard Mandarin
- Hanyu Pinyin: Luó Jiāyīng
Yue: Cantonese
- Jyutping: lo4 gaa1 jing1

Law Hang-tong
- Traditional Chinese: 羅行堂
- Simplified Chinese: 罗行堂
Transcriptions
Standard Mandarin
- Hanyu Pinyin: Luó Xíngtáng

Dr Law Kar-ying BBS MH (born September 22, 1946) is a Hong Kong Cantonese opera singer and actor.

== Life and career ==
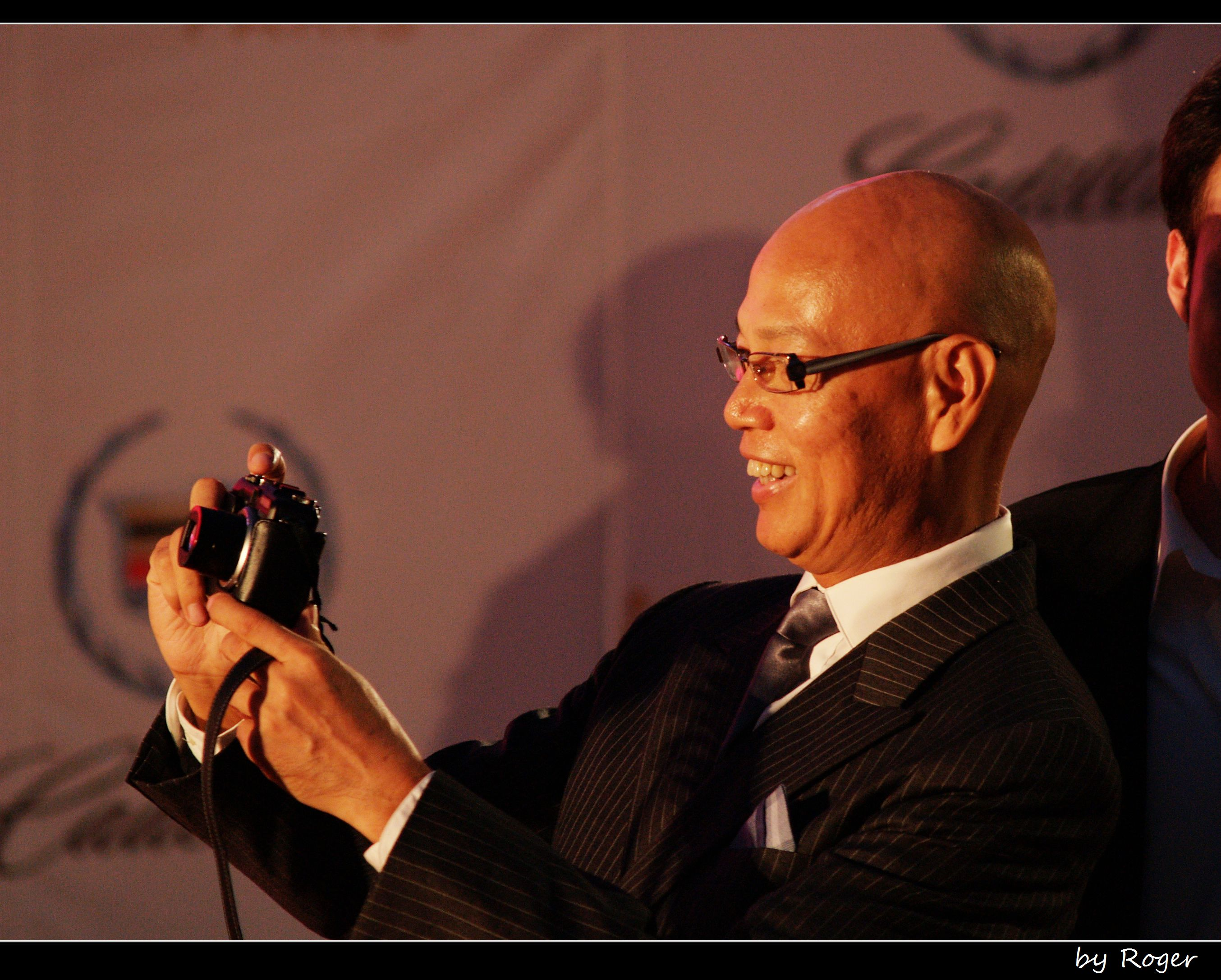
Law at the 2007 Shanghai International Film Festival.

Born Law Hang-tong on September 22, 1946 in Shunde, Guangdong as the eldest son of actor Law Kar-kuen (羅家權) and his wife Lee Ngan-guen (李銀娟). His younger brothers are Law Yiu-tong (羅耀堂), Law Yau-tong (羅友堂), and Law Shiu-tong (羅紹堂). His younger sister is Law Sok-ching (羅素貞). In 1949, his family moved to Hong Kong.

He was originally a Cantonese opera singer in the 1970s. And a practitioner of the Ng Ying Kungfu (Chinese: 五形功夫) Five Animal Kung Fu arts. In 1990 he turned to acting in movies. He became popular after being cast in From Beijing with Love, which also starred Stephen Chow, as Da Vinci, an inventor whose list of (useless) gadgets include a solar-powered torch.

In 1990s, Law played Wong Yat-fei in his first movie debut in 1993 film Crime Story along with Jackie Chan. In 1994 he was cast in Jeff Lau's film duology A Chinese Odyssey, in which he played the verbose Longevity Monk (Xuanzang), singing a Cantonese cover of "Only You (And You Alone)" midway during the film.

Law has rarely acted in television, especially on TVB, the television station of his wife, Liza Wang. He is most known for cooperating with ATV, which is TVB's rival.

In September 2022, Law apologized after mainland Chinese netizens criticized Law after he made a post, which he later deleted, stating "Hong Kong was a blessed land during her reign", in reference to Queen Elizabeth II.

== Cantonese opera performances ==
In the 2018 HK Arts Festival, Law was cast as Xiang Yu along with Yau Sing Po in the classic opera Farewell My Concubine.

== Filmography ==
Sources:

- Crime Story (1993) – Wong Yat-fei
- From Beijing with Love (1994) – Da Mansi
- He's a Woman, She's a Man (1994) – Joseph
- He and She (1994) – The Magistrate
- Easy Money (1994) – Chiang Chia-Cheh
- Whatever You Want (1994) – Keanu/Kwok-Wing/Actor on Television
- A Chinese Odyssey Part One: Pandora's Box (1995) – Tang Sanzang
- A Chinese Odyssey Part Two: Cinderella (1995) – Tang Sanzang
- Heaven Can't Wait (1995) – Ng Kong
- Dream Lover (1995) – Dr. Law – Kitty's uncle
- Man Wanted (1995) – Bald Yin
- Summer Snow (1995) – Bing Sun
- Tricky Business (1995) – Lau Kar-Lin
- The Chinese Feast (1995) – Au Siu-Fung
- Because of Lies (1995) – Ho Siu B
- Mack the Knife (1995) – Street preacher
- Passion 1995 (1995) – Johnny, man in photograph
- Ten Brothers (1995) – Wonderful Eyes
- 1941 Hong Kong on Fire (1995) – Hoi
- God of Cookery (1996) – Competition Master of Ceremonies
- Once Upon a Time in Shanghai (1996) (TV series)
- Dr. Wai in "The Scripture with No Words" (1996) – Headmaster
- Forbidden City Cop (1996) – Fat-Yan
- Feel 100% (1996) – Robert
- Feel 100%... Once More (1996) (uncredited) – Director
- Bodyguards of the Last Governor (1996) – Last Governor of Hong Kong
- Combo Cops (1996) – Tiger
- Dragon from Shaolin (1996)
- Viva Erotica (1996) – Chung
- Those Were the Days (1996) – Feng Siu-Tien
- Twinkle Twinkle Lucky Star (Yun cai zhi li xing) (1996) – Cup Noodle
- Another Chinese Cop (1996) – Li, Tai-Chu
- A Recipe for the Heart (1997) (TV series)
- Kitchen (1997) – Emma
- We're No Bad Guys (1997) – Bond Chu/Jade Dragon
- Lawyer Lawyer (1997) – Fong Tong-Ken
- Love: Amoeba Style (1997)
- S.D.U. '97 (1997) – Wong, Yan-Kwai
- Made in Heaven (1997) – Dr. Law
- Those Were the Days (1997) – Wong Fei-hung
- Cause We Are So Young (1997) (uncredited)
- Ah Fai, the Dumb (1997) – Uncle Ying/Iron Pen
- A Tough Side of a Lady (1998) – Mulan's father
- Chinese Midnight Express (1998) – Guard
- Criss-Cross Over Four Seas (1999) (TV series) – Clergyman
- Gorgeous (1999) – Chan's assistant
- The Tricky Master (1999) – Sing
- Funny Business (2000)
- When I Fall in Love... with Both (2000) – Owner of bridal shop
- 2002 (2001) – Paper Chan
- City of Desire (2001)
- Far from Home (2002)
- Windfall Profits (2002) – Uncle Sixth
- Perfect Education 3 (2002)
- The Monkey King (2002) (TV series) – Golden Star
- Dragon Loaded 2003 (2003) – Mr. Lung
- 6 A.M. (2004) – Taxi Driver
- Escape from Hong Kong Island (2004) – Raymond's boss
- Osaka Wrestling Restaurant (2004) – Dragon
- Enter the Phoenix (2004) – Father Eight
- Magic Kitchen (2004) – Yau's Dad
- House of Fury (2005) – Cab driver
- Central Affairs 2 (2006) (TV series) – Kong So
- The Shopaholics (2006) – West Ho
- PK.COM.CN (2007)
- Crazy Money & Funny Men (2007)
- The Deserted Inn (2008)
- Chongqing Girl (2009)
- Metallic Attraction: Kungfu Cyborg (2009)
- On His Majesty's Secret Service (2009)
- 14 Blades (2010)
- Future X-Cops (2010)
- Flirting Scholar 2 (2010)
- Adventure of the King (2010)
- Legend of the Swordsman (2010)
- Painted Skin (2011) (TV series)
- The Sorcerer and the White Snake (2011)
- The 33D Invader (2011)
- Single Terminator (2011)
- The Assassins (2012)
- Mr. and Mrs. Gambler (2012)
- To Forgive (2012)
- Tears in Heaven (2012)
- Murcielago (2013)
- The Twins' Code (2013)
- A Stupid Journey (2014)
- The Buddha's Shadow (2014)
- Who Moved My Dream (2014)
- Death Trip (2015)
- The Ghost House (2015)
- Super Models (2015)
- From Vegas to Macau III (2016)
- The Great Detective (2017)
- Staycation (2018)
- The Incredible Monk (2018)
- Comedy Star (2018)
- A Home with a View (2018)
- White Bone Lady Fights the Wolf Demon (2018)
- Bajie Subdues Demons (2018)
- Amazing Spring (2019)
- A Home with a View (2019)
- The Great Detective (2019)
- Bajie Subdues Demons 2 (2019)
- The Duke of Royal Tramp (2019)
- Dynasty Warriors (2021)

=== Music video appearances ===
Year	Title
2022	Edan Lui - "Elevator"

== Personal life ==
In 2004, Law was diagnosed with stage III liver cancer. In 2005, Law had surgery and recovered at home. In 2013, his liver was found to have a two-centimeter tumor and went for surgery again. He has led a healthy lifestyle since then. In 2019, doctors found cancerous cells after Law went for a prostate biopsy earlier in the year. He went to the hospital in last June for an operation to remove the prostate and has recovered since.

On May 2, 2009, Law married longtime partner Liza Wang in Las Vegas. They announced their union on TVB through Stephen Chow. On July 1, 2018, Law was awarded Bronze Bauhinia Star (BBS) by the Chief Executive of Hong Kong Special Administration Region, in recognition of his contribution to the Cantonese opera in Hong Kong.

Awards
Preceded by Jordan Chan for Twenty Something	Hong Kong Film Awards for Best Supporting Actor; 1996 for Summer Snow	Succeeded by Eric Tsang for Comrades: Almost a Love Story
