= The Tricky Master =

1999 Hong Kong film by Wong Jing

- Film poster
- Directed by: Wong Jing
- Written by: Wong Jing
- Produced by: Wong Jing
- Starring: Stephen Chow; Nick Cheung; Sandra Ng; Wong Jing; Kelly Lin; Suki Kwan
- Cinematography: Ko Chiu Lam
- Edited by: Sue Woo
- Music by: Lincoln Lo
- Production company: BoB and Partners
- Release date: 5 August 1999
- Running time: 95 minutes
- Country: Hong Kong
- Language: Cantonese
- Box office: HK$19,141,640 (Hong Kong)

The Tricky Master (千王之王2000) is a 1999 Hong Kong crime comedy film directed by Wong Jing.

The film is set in Happy Valley, Hong Kong. A police detective requests work on a major case, in hopes of a promotion. He is assigned with spying on a high-profile con-artist, and he loses his job when he is tricked by his subject. The disgraced detective then requests lessons in becoming a con-artist by an experienced master of the trade, as he seeks revenge.

== Plot ==
Leung Foon is a happy-go-lucky man with a girlfriend named Pizza. He is a police detective in the Happy Valley Police Station. He is tasked as a small-time undercover with his superior nicknamed "Thousand Faced Man". After their undercover case of protecting a millionaire's daughter nearly failed, Leung was tired of taking undercover work and even protested to quit the police force if he is not given a big-time case. Eventually "Thousand Faced" gave Leung the biggest task of bringing a big-time swindler named Ferrari to justice. If he succeeds, he will be rewarded with a promotion, despite Leung failing his "preparedness test".

Leung first starts the investigation by doing what he does best, going undercover as a "invited guest" heading towards Ferrari's beach. As he arrived on the shore, he met First Love, a con-woman in disguise of a sweet, cool girl and asking for her phone number (she typed a vulgarity on his mobile phone). After one of Ferrari's henchmen, Fat Pig splashed on Leung at the beach, he was taken to Ferrari's mansion to become one of his security guards.

After Leung realized he was tricked by Ferrari and one of his con-women, First Love along with losing his job after Ferrari encrypted all his server's data with a computer virus. He knew what was going on when Leung tried to burn a CD with some data from one of his computers to take as evidence. Leung was forced to approach Pizza's brother-in-law Master Wong, a gifted conman whom he and Pizza met in Macau (and hated by Leung) to learn his skills and become a conman with a vengeance.

== Cast ==
- Nick Cheung as Leung Foon
- Stephen Chow as Master Wong
- Sandra Ng as Wasabi
- Kingdom Yuen as Teacher
- Tin Kai-Man as Prison guard
- Law Kar-ying as Sing
- Bowie Wu as Brother Tone
- Ken Lo as Lan
- Lee Siu-kei as Prison guard
- Lee Kin-yan as Guard
- Wong Jing as Ferrari
- Kelly Lin as First Love
- Tats Lau as Leung Foon's superior, "Thousand Faced Man"
- Suki Kwan as Pizza
- Bobby Yip as Brother 5
- Frankie Ng as Prison guard
- Samuel Leung
- William Duen as Fat Pig
- Nancy Lan
- Tsang Kan Wing as Uncle Lin
- Celia Sze as Rich girl
- Aman Chang as Long hair
- Bowie Lau as Ken
- Chui Chan Wa as Card dealer
- Sunny Luk
- Andy Tsang
- Poon An Ying as Cleaning lady
- Cheung Bing Chuen as Kidnapper
- Lee Kim Wing as Kidnapper
- Leung Kei Hei as Kidnapper
- Lee Tat Chiu as Guard
- So Wai Nam as Guard
- Chow Kam Kong as Guard
- Ma Yuk Sing as Guard
- Chan Hing Hang
- Yuen Man Chun
- Chan Kin Yung as Policeman
- Lam Kwok Kit
- Tam Tin Bo as Mahjong player
- Sin Yan Kin as Gambler
- Choi Chi Fung as Hon's thug
- Keung Hak Shing
- Wong Kwan Hong
- Wong Siu Keung

== Reception ==
The film grossed HK19,141,640 (US$2.46 million) in Hong Kong.

== See also ==
- Tricky Brains, another film directed by Wong Jing centering around trickery
