= Fight Back to School III =

1993 Hong Kong film by Wong Jing

- DVD cover
- Directed by: Wong Jing
- Written by: Wong Jing
- Produced by: Stephen Shiu
- Starring: Stephen Chow; Anita Mui; Cheung Man; Natalis Chan; Kathy Chow; Anthony Wong; Bryan Leung
- Cinematography: Gigo Lee Ji-Hang
- Edited by: Poon Hung
- Music by: Lowell Lo
- Distributed by: Win's Movie Production & I/E Co. Ltd. Gala Film Distribution Limited
- Release date: 14 January 1993
- Running time: 89 minutes
- Country: Hong Kong
- Languages: Cantonese; Mandarin

Fight Back to School III (Chinese: 逃學威龍3之龍過雞年) is a Hong Kong comedy film written and directed by Wong Jing, who took over as director for the final installment in the series, following Gordon Chan's work on the 1991 film Fight Back to School and its 1992 sequel, Fight Back to School II. The film stars Stephen Chow, Anita Mui, and Anthony Wong.

== Plot ==
Chow Sing-Sing, an obnoxious undercover cop, finds himself in all sorts of trouble. This time, instead of returning to school, Chow goes undercover as the husband of a wealthy socialite. His fiancée disapproves and attempts to convince him to abandon his undercover work.

== Cast and roles ==
- Stephen Chow as Star Chow and Million Wong
- Anita Mui as Judy Tong Wong
- Sharla Cheung as Man
- Anthony Wong as Tailor Lam
- Natalis Chan as Man's Cousin
- Philip Chan as Superintendent, Officer Chan
- John Ching as Devil of Gamblers
- Kathy Chow as Ching Man Ching
- Paul Chun as Mr. Hung 'King of Gamblers'
- Bryan Leung as Superintendent, Officer Lai
- Mimi Chu as Japanese Housekeeper “呢卷厕子”

== Reception ==
Fight Back to School III was the tenth highest grossing films in Hong Kong in 1993, earning 25.77 million Hong Kong dollars.

Phil Mills of FatEastFilms.com criticized Fight Back to School III as the weakest installment in the series, noting that "no attempt is made to connect it to its predecessors".
