= Lee Lik-chi =

Hong Kong actor and director

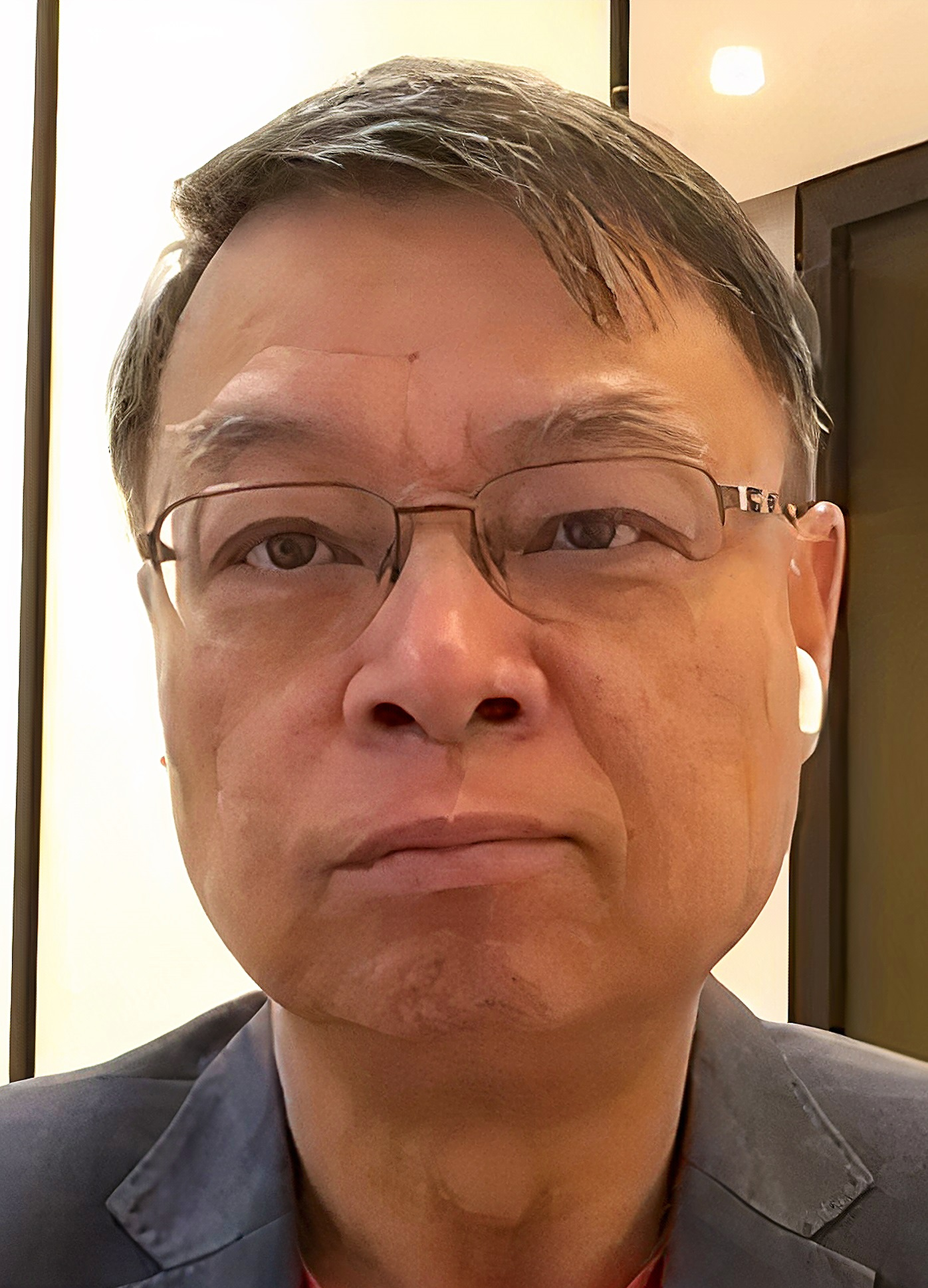
- Lee Lik-chi in 2021
- Born: 10 May 1961 (age 64); Hong Kong
- Occupations: Film director Screenwriter

Lee Lik-chi (李力持) (born 10 May 1961) is a Hong Kong–based actor, director, and screenwriter. He is best known for his collaborations with Stephen Chow before disassociating each other due to frequent clashes.

He is also an active contributor to local education, lecturing and organising filmmaking programs to students.

== Biography ==
Lee was born into a working-class family and grew up in government housing. His father was a metalworker and his mother was a textile worker. He has two brothers and a sister.

His chemistry teacher taught him how to use a camera. Lee started in the entertainment industry as a production assistant at ATV.

== Filmography ==
- Kill the Monster (2021; director)
- Four in Life (2013; director, writer)
- Flirting Scholar 2 (2010; director, writer)
- The King of Comedy (1999; director)
- Gorgeous (1999; actor)
- The Lucky Guy (1998; director, writer)
- Troublesome Night 3 (1998; actor)
- Killing Me Tenderly (film) (1997; director, writer)
- Troublesome Night (1997; actor)
- The God of Cookery (1996; director)
- Ten Brothers (1995; director, producer, actor)
- Tricky Business (1995; director, writer)
- Romantic Dream (1995; director, writer)
- Out of the Dark (1995; actor)
- From Beijing with Love (1994; director, writer, actor)
- Love on Delivery (1994; director, actor)
- Modern Romance (1994; director, writer, actor)
- The Tigers: The Legend of Canton (1993; director, writer)
- Flirting Scholar (1993; director, writer)
- Master Wong vs. Master Wong (1993; director, writer)
- The Thief of Time (1992; director, producer)
- Once Upon a Time a Hero in China (1992; director)
- Magnificent Scoundrels (1991; director, writer)
- The Set Up (1990)
