= Kungfu Cyborg =

2009 Hong Kong film by Jeffrey Lau

- Theatrical poster
- Directed by: Jeffrey Lau
- Written by: Jeffrey Lau
- Produced by: Charley Zhuo
- Starring: Hu Jun; Betty Sun; Alex Fong; Ronald Cheng; Wu Jing
- Cinematography: Edmond Fung
- Edited by: Angie Lam
- Music by: Ronald Cheng; Mark Lui
- Production company: Shanghai Film Group Corporation
- Distributed by: Mei Ah Entertainment; Shanghai Film Group Corporation
- Release dates: 13 August 2009 (China); 20 August 2009 (Hong Kong)
- Running time: 102 minutes
- Country: Hong Kong
- Languages: Cantonese; Mandarin

Kungfu Cyborg (simplified Chinese: 机器侠; traditional Chinese: 機器俠; pinyin: Jīqì Xiá) is a 2009 Hong Kong science fiction action film directed by Jeffrey Lau.

== Plot ==
In the near future, De Ming is a top law enforcement officer in China. He is a cyborg designed to handle assignments too dangerous for traditional methods and is the first in the TN Research Bureau's "K Series," a line of cybernetic organisms programmed with a sophisticated social conscience.

De Ming is sent to a remote town as part of a covert training operation, under the supervision of the local police captain, Xu Dachun. Xu's mission is to help De Ming integrate into the community undercover while keeping his true identity a secret. De Ming gains the trust of the town residents, particularly Su Mei, a fellow officer who is also the object of the captain's affection.

One of De Ming's cybernetic counterparts, K-88, goes missing after a critical neural meltdown. Xu and De Ming track down the malfunctioning cyborg, leading to a confrontation that leaves Xu injured and De Ming conflicted about his role in human society.

Although the mission is successful, De Ming is haunted by the consequences of his actions. Xu's behavior becomes increasingly erratic after the battle with K-88, a fact De Ming hides from his colleagues and superiors. Su Mei also struggles with her feelings for De Ming, who, as a machine, cannot reciprocate her emotions.

Faced with a group of cyborg assassins seeking revenge for his perceived betrayal, De Ming must reconcile his connection to humanity with the realization that he will never fully be a part of it.

== Cast ==
- Hu Jun as Xu Dachun (Note: Chin Kar Lok provides the Cantonese voice dubbing.)
- Betty Sun as Zhou Sumei (Note: Stephy Tang provides the Cantonese voice dubbing)
- Alex Fong as De Ming/K-1
- Gan Wei as Zhou Suqing
- Ronald Cheng as Jiang
- Wu Jing as K-88
- Eric Tsang as Lin Xiang
- Law Kar-ying as Ying Ming
- Lee Kin-yan as Yu Hua

== Awards and nominations ==
29th Hong Kong Film Awards

- Nominated: Best Visual Effects (Cecil Cheng Man Ching and Don Ma Wing On)
