= Lee Kin-yan =

Hong Kong actor

Lee Kin-yan (Chinese: 李健仁; pinyin: Lǐ Jiànrén; born 12 May 1961) is a Hong Kong actor, who frequently makes comic cameo appearances in Stephen Chow's films, as a cross-dressing man with a finger up his nose known as Yu Fa (Chinese: 如花; Cantonese: yu fa; Mandarin: ru2 hua1), meaning "flower-like" in Chinese, and he also acquired his nickname from this character.

== Personal life ==
Lee has one son and two daughters. In September 2019, he suffered a stroke and collapsed at a sauna in Shenzhen. While Lee survived, the stroke caused him to be partially paralysed and have difficulties speaking.

== Filmography ==
- The Legend of Zu 2 (2019)
- Hunter Bounty 2 (2019)
- Hunter Bounty 1 (2019)
- A Stupid Journey (2014)
- Long's Story (2014)
- Just Another Margin (2014)
- Ameera (2014)
- Kungfu Cyborg (2009) as Yu Fa
- The Lady Iron Chef (2007)
- Bet to Basic (2006)
- A Chinese Tall Story (2005)
- Kung Fu Mahjong 2 (2005)
- China's Next Top Princess (2005)
- Sex and the Beauties (2004) as Restaurant owner
- Shaolin Soccer (2001) as Manny
- Street Kids Violence (1999) as Uncle San
- Troublesome Night 5 (1999) as Ghost Policeman
- 9413 (1998) as Fatty Chuen
- The Lucky Guy (1998)
- Troublesome Night 3 (1998) as Edgy Funeral Director
- 03:00 A.M. (1997) as Shing
- Lawyer Lawyer (1997)
- We're No Bad Guys (1997) as Tinny's manager
- Cause We Are So Young (1997) (uncredited)
- Killing Me Tenderly (film) (1997)
- God of Cookery (1996) as Fan Club Member
- Forbidden City Cop (1996) as Emperor's Mistress
- Out of the Dark (1995)
- Once Upon a Time in Triad Society 2 (1996)
- Sixty Million Dollar Man (1995) as Siu-Fu
- From Beijing with Love (1994) as Whore
- Hail the Judge (1994) as Servant
- A Chinese Odyssey Part Two: Cinderella (1994)
- A Chinese Odyssey Part One: Pandora's Box (1994)
- Flirting Scholar (1993)
