= Sixty Million Dollar Man =

1995 Hong Kong film by Raymond Yip

- Film poster
- Directed by: Wai Man Yip
- Written by: Wai Man Yip
- Produced by: Wong Jing
- Starring: Stephen Chow; Ng Man Tat; Gigi Leung; Paulyn Sun; Charles Shen; Joe Cheng
- Cinematography: Andrew Lau
- Edited by: Marco Mak
- Music by: Marco Wan; Lee Hon-Kam
- Distributed by: Win's Entertainment, Ltd.
- Release date: 19 August 1995
- Running time: 90 minutes
- Country: Hong Kong
- Language: Cantonese
- Box office: HK$35,234,481.00

Sixty Million Dollar Man (Chinese: 百變星君) is a 1995 Hong Kong comedy film written and directed by Raymond Yip and starring Stephen Chow, Ng Man Tat, and Gigi Leung.

== Plot ==
Lee Chak-Sing (Stephen Chow) is a rich kid living in Hawaii. He's arrogant and fond of playing mean tricks on everyone around him. His life changes when he meets Chung-Chung (Gigi Leung), a young woman whom he declares is very ugly.

Sing offends local crime lord Fumito (Joe Cheng) by dancing with Fumito's girlfriend in a Pulp Fiction-inspired dance contest. In a fit of rage, Fumito orders his henchman Mark (Charles Shen) to kill Sing.

Tat (Ng Man Tat), Sing's loyal assistant, is revealed by Sing's mother to be his true father. He is then faced with a decision: Accept Tat as his father and lose his inheritance or continue to call the other man his father and live in the lap of luxury. He chooses his father.

When Tat comes to rescue his son, both are caught by Mark and tied together in a bathroom stall, where Mark planted a bomb. Sing chops off his arm and manages to let his father escape on an ejector toilet seat, leaving Sing to apparently die in the explosion.

Sing's brain and lips are recovered. There is technology to construct a new body for him at the cost of $60,000,000. However, since Sing renounced his rich father, he doesn't have the money. Tat can only provide $6,000.

Chang (Elvis Tsui), offers to create a body for $6,000. After some trial and error, such as creating legs out of arms, Sing is transformed into a cyborg.

To fool Fumito, however, a funeral is staged for Sing, where he hides to watch. The only person to attend is Chung-Chung, who is unaware of Sing's true fate, and mourns his death. When Sing sees this, he feels remorse for mistreating her (and everyone else).

Two years later, he gets a job as a teacher at one of the worst schools in the area. He is harassed and assaulted by the students, culminating in Sing being "crucified" on the front gate of the school with his (low-cost) garden hose genitalia hanging out. Chung-Chung also works at the school, but has matured and is no longer the awkward, unattractive girl that Sing knew. She also has a rich fiancé with a fancy sports car.

That evening, in a fit of despair, Sing attempts suicide but is stopped when Chang delivers a new microchip he's been working on. The microchip enables Sing to transform into many different household appliances and makes him nearly indestructible.

Sing returns to the school and corrects the anarchy, serving as a superhuman disciplinarian. Under his care, all the students become diligent and hardworking.

Sing's fame catches Fumito's attention. He sends Mark to finish Sing off, but Mark fails. The henchman tries to escape, but Sing kills him by twisting his body into a human basketball. Using his wealth, Fumito has Mark rebuilt into a powerful cyborg with shape-shifting abilities.

Mark infiltrates Sing's wedding party as Sing's old friend Siu-Fu, but Sing sees through the disguise. In the ensuing chaos, Sing is apparently killed in an explosion. To everyone's surprise, Sing returns as a powerful old lady, resembling a Park'n Shop mascot, in a bulletproof robe. Ultimately, Sing transforms into a microwave oven and traps Mark inside, burning him to death. Fumito is disposed of soon after.

== Cast ==
- Stephen Chow – Lee Chak-Sing
- Ng Man-tat – Tat
- Gigi Leung – Chung-Chung
- Elvis Tsui – Professor Chang Sze
- Charles Shen – Mark/ Cyborg Mark
- Joe Cheng – Fumito
- Paulyn Sun – Bonnie
- Chan Chi-Fai – Teacher
- Dang Siu-Juen – Chung Chung's Fiancé
- Hung Siu-Wan
- Alvina Kong – Aunt
- Guy Lai – Uncle
- Dion Lam – Man in Zebra Suit
- Lee Kin-yan – Siu-Fu
- David John Saunders – Bodyguard
- Darren Shahlavi – Bodyguard
- Sung Boon-Chung – Student Leader (with shaved head)
- Manfred Wong – Principal
- Wong Yut-Fei – Lee Yat-Fai
- Mimi Zhu – Sing's Mother

== Release ==
Sixty Million Dollar Man was released in Hong Kong on 19 August 1995. In the Philippines, the film was released as My Magic Professor on 29 May 1996.

== Trivia ==
The opening theme of this film has a resemblance to Barry Manilow's hit song Copacabana.
