= From Beijing with Love =

1994 Hong Kong film by Stephen Chow and Lee Lik-chi

- Hong Kong film poster

Chinese name
- Traditional Chinese: 國產凌凌漆
- Literal meaning: The Domestically-produced 007
Transcriptions
Yue: Cantonese
- Jyutping: gwok3 caan2 ling4 ling4 cat1
- Directed by: Stephen Chow; Lee Lik-chi
- Written by: Stephen Chow; Roman Cheung\Vincent Kok; Lee Lik-chi
- Produced by: Charles Heung; Jimmy Heung
- Starring: Stephen Chow; Anita Yuen; Law Kar-ying; Lee Lik-chi
- Cinematography: Lee Kin-keung; Tom Lau
- Edited by: Ma Chung-yiu
- Music by: William Hu
- Production company: Win's Movie Production Ltd.
- Distributed by: Golden Harvest
- Release date: 14 September 1994
- Running time: 83 minutes
- Country: Hong Kong
- Language: Cantonese
- Box office: HK$37,523,850.00

From Beijing With Love (Chinese: 國產凌凌漆) is a 1994 Hong Kong spy comedy film directed by Stephen Chow and Lee Lik-chi. The film is a very direct spoof of the James Bond films.

== Plot ==
002 is able to recover a valuable Tyrannosaurus fossil skull stolen from the Government of China, but is killed by a mysterious gunman with a golden gun. Pressured by the Prime Minister to find the skull, the Commander reactivates 007, the son of a great operative but was ruled unfit for duty due to low aptitude scores, to investigate.

For the past 10 years, 007 has been undercover as a butcher in Shenzhen, frequenting local hookers and drinking dry martinis. When he's called back in by quartermaster Tat Man-sai, he eagerly reports in for duty. In his mission briefing with the Commander, he's given orders to meet with a contact in Hong Kong and to start surveillance on notorious smuggler Lai who may be moving the skull, and to be careful of the mysterious Golden Gunman. He also gives 007 some money for a new suit. The Commander's decision to send 007 is questioned by Northern Commander Chan, who doesn't trust the Southern Commander and has already sent agents to investigate the skull's disappearance. The Commander's personal operative Kam murders Chan, and the Commander, revealing himself to be the Golden Gunman, burns the body with an incendiary round from the Golden Gun. He sends Kam to be 007's contact and to kill him when she gets the chance.

Receiving instructions to meet with his contact at Triangle Park, 007 meets with Kam. During their initial meeting, Kam casually sings a song by Jacky Cheung, whose title is the same as her mom's name. 007 shows off his spy gadgets, which all seem to be centered around grooming (hair dryers and shavers), while Kam shows off her arsenal of guns, including a "UFO long range rifle" that uses her own specialized ammunition. 007 reveals that his expertise is not in guns, but in blades and knife throwing and tries to demonstrate on a Mickey Mouse doll, missing it entirely. Despite her best efforts, Kam is unable to kill 007 after shooting herself with 007's trick gun that shoots backwards then forwards. Immediately reporting in to the Commander on a communicator in the toilet, Kam confirms that contact has been made, but is told to wait until a party at Lai's home to kill 007 and set up Lai for his death. 007 walks in on this meeting, with the Commander quickly changing tone and wishing the two success in their mission and ending the transmission with a flush of the toilet.

Stuck with waiting to kill 007, both Kam and 007 are eating at a restaurant when 007 has a chance encounter with a group of men about to rob a jewelry store. After the robbery, Kam looks on as they take 007 and a child hostage after killing the child's father. 007, armed with his butcher's knife, kills one robber before throwing a slew of daggers at the other robbers in an elevator. Kam realizes that in his previous demonstration on knife throwing, he missed the doll because he was aiming for a fly on the wall instead. Reporting to the Commander on the toilet again about this failed attempt to kill 007 and wanting to understand why 007 needs to die, he chews her out and reminds her that she is alive because he saved her from the fate of her family, who were traitors to the country. When expressing doubts about who 007 is, the Commander tries to convince her that he's a child murderer and rapist of pregnant women and that he deserves to die. 007 walks in after Kam finishes her report and flushes the toilet, asking for money to donate to the family of the child who was taken hostage earlier.

Kam brings 007 to the home of Lai to sneak him into a party he's holding. Knowing that they will go their separate ways after this mission, 007 asks Kam what she'd like before he leaves, jokingly saying some white roses. 007 asks if the name of Kam's mother is the same as the song, because it was the name of a national traitor. Kam punches him for asking such a sensitive question, but both continue with the mission. Using a special "magic box" to launch him into the party (after Kam used keys to open the door for him), 007 infiltrates the mansion, which is just holding a pool party. Hoping to listen in on Lai taking a phone call, 007 hears him talking about bones (even though Lai is just giving instructions on how to make bone broth). Directing 007 to an open area so she can take him out with her UFO rifle, Kam tells 007 to play a song on the piano since he likes to sing. 007 then sings the Jacky Cheung song, which causes Kam to reconsider taking him out.

A mysterious woman appears, saying that she's here looking for 007 and Kam. A man attacks the party from afar by throwing a lamppost at 007, and the woman takes out a gun and starts shooting. After incapacitating her with a dagger, 007 tells Kam to get out, but Kam starts firing at 007 with her rifle. Seeing 007 run across the yard, she hits him multiple times, also killing Lai in the process. Back in the car, Kam prepares to leave when 007 suddenly appears and jumps in, showing that he wore his bulletproof vest but also getting hit in the leg. Presenting her with white roses, which he went to grab when he got shot by Kam, 007 is bleeding out and needs medical attention. The man from who attacked earlier grabs the car and lifts it up, but Kam is able to run him over and escape. Dragging 007 back into her apartment, Kam prepares to take the bullet out when she gets a transmission from the Commander. She hangs up on him and attends to 007, clutching the white roses he gave her. Using his butcher knife to open the bullet wound, 007 tells Kam she needs to take the bullet out. Equipped with nothing but a hammer and a chisel and using a porn video to distract 007 in lieu of anesthetics, Kam works to take the bullet out, learning that 007 is also and orphan like her and telling him that a painting in her home is of her parents. After removing the bullet and cauterizing the wound, Kam hugs 007 in joy until 007 recognizes the bullet round as her specialized ammunition. 007 asks Kam about her connection to the Golden Gunman, but she refuses to expose anything. Confused as to why she tried to kill him but ended up saving his life, 007 doesn't want to take part in the mission anymore and leaves Kam. When 007 reappears at the doorway, Kam tells him that the Commander is the Golden Gunman and that he has the dinosaur skull, but is confused with 007 is suddenly a lot taller than before. It's actually the mysterious woman from the party in disguise, one of Commander Chan's operatives, as is the man from the party, who crashes in through the window. He tells Kam to lead them to the Golden Gunman.

007 reports back to the Commander about what happened during the mission, telling him that Kam is missing. The Commander hastily has him sign some forms to send him to a hospital, but it turns out that 007 signed a confession that he is a national traitor and is taken out to be executed. With 007 out of the way, the Commander has the skull packed up to be taken to a buyer when he is confronted by Chan's operatives and Kam. He shoots Kam to silence her, but she was wearing a bulletproof vest. Kam and the operatives dispatch the Commander's soldiers, but he has gone to put on the Golden Gunman armor. Both of Chan's operatives are killed by the Commander, who prepares to kill Kam when Tat Man-sai appears with 007. Revealing that he used some of the money the Commander gave him to bribe off the firing squad meant to execute him, 007 is determined to take out the Commander. Tat Man-sai takes out his latest invention the "Lifetaker 3000", which is just 10 different weapons tied together with rope, but is quickly shot by the Commander. 007, using his butcher knife, takes on the Commander and slashes through his gun and armor, killing him.

Back at 007's butcher stand in Shenzhen, the stand rocks violently as a woman comes up to buy some pork. 007 and Kam, half-dressed, get out from beneath the stand and tell her to get lost. Tat Man-sai, the newly promoted Commander, briefs 007 on a spy satellite that just got lost in space and requests he report in for the good of national security. 007 tells him he's occupied, and he and Kam go back to having sex under the stand. Embedded in the chopping block is a brand new butcher knife, with the calligraphy of Deng Xiaoping saying "民族英雄," meaning "national hero".

== Cast ==
- Stephen Chow as Ling Ling Chat (Homophonic pun of '007' in Cantonese)
- Anita Yuen as Lee Heung-kam
- Law Kar-ying as Tat Man-sai (Homophonic pun of Leonardo da Vinci in Cantonese)
- Wong Kam-kong as the Commander/Golden Gunman, a corrupt commander of the Guangzhou Military Region
- Pauline Chan as Mystery woman
- Lee Lik-chi as Executed martial arts master
- Wong Yat-fei as Executed illiterate person
- Yu Rongguang as 002, agent killed by Golden Gun
- Lee Kin-yan as Regent Motel manager
- Yip Chun as Deputy commander Chan
- Leung Hak-shun as Lai Yau-wai
- Spencer Leung as Man about to be executed
- Johnny Dang Siu-Juen as Man about to be executed
- Raymond Tsang as Man from Hunan
- Joe Cheng Cho as Metal Death Killer (based on Jaws from Moonraker)
- Indra Leech as Guard
- Jerry Ku as Firing squad commander
- Chow Yee-Fan as Bald waiter
- Quinton Wong Liu-Che as Photographer
- Wong Kar-Leung as Soldier
- So Wai-Nam as Soldier
- Tang Tai-Wo as Soldier
- Lam Kwok-Kit as Soldier
- Chung Wing as Soldier
- Wong Shiu-Keung as Hotel clerk
- Lo Gwok-Wai as Firing squad soldier

== References to other films ==
DVD cover.

- The name of the film in Chinese means "the domestically-produced 007".
- The scene where Stephen Chow meets Anita Yuen wearing a green blouse in the park feeding dogs is a direct reference to a scene in the film C'est la vie, mon chéri, also featuring Anita Yuen.
- The scene where the commander explains the Tyrannosaurus fossil to Chat includes the two using Jurassic Park as direct references when the commander describes Tyrannosaurus as "the one that roars".
- The name of the "ultimate weapon" invented by Tat Man-sai, 攞你命3000 (Lifetaker 3000), is also the name of a Hong Kong, low-budget blue movie.
- The Universe Laser DVD cover (pictured on right) of the movie parodies that of the 1987 James Bond movie The Living Daylights.
- The Golden Gun's signature weapon is a spoof of the golden gun used in the James Bond novel The Man with the Golden Gun. Unlike the one from the James Bond series, this one shoots out extremely powerful explosive bullets instead of a one-hit fatal fragmentation bullet.
- In Tat Man-sai's briefing at the end of the movie, he mentions a space satellite that's gone missing. This is probably a reference to the James Bond film You Only Live Twice, where US satellite is taken in space in the opening scene.

== Music ==
Multiple references are made to the song 李香蘭 by Jacky Cheung throughout the film. Released in 1990, 李香蘭 (Lǐxiānglán; the chinese name of Yoshiko Yamaguchi) is a Chinese-language adaptation of the 1989 Japanese song "Ikanaide" (行かないで) by Kōji Tamaki. It is considered one of Cheung's signature songs.

== Box office and reception ==
The film grossed HK$37,523,850 in Hong Kong and has garnered positive reviews in Taiwan as well. The review aggregator Rotten Tomatoes reported an approval rating of 50%, based on 6 reviews.

== Award nominations ==
Year	Award	Category	Nominee	Result
1995	14th Hong Kong Film Awards	Best Actor	Stephen Chow	Nominated
1995	14th Hong Kong Film Awards	Best Supporting Actor	Law Kar-ying	Nominated
