= King of Comedy (film) =

1999 Hong Kong film by Lee Lik-chi and Stephen Chow

- Hong Kong release poster

Chinese name
- Traditional Chinese: 喜劇之王
- Simplified Chinese: 喜剧之王
Transcriptions
Standard Mandarin
- Hanyu Pinyin: Xǐjù zhī wáng
Yue: Cantonese
- Jyutping: hei2 kek6 zi1 wong4
- Directed by: Stephen Chow; Lee Lik-chi
- Screenplay by: Stephen Chow; Tsang Kan-cheung; Erica Li; Cheng Man-fai; Fung Min-hun; Leung Ka-kit
- Produced by: Yeung Kwok-fai
- Starring: Stephen Chow; Karen Mok; Cecilia Cheung; Ng Man-tat
- Cinematography: Horace Wong
- Edited by: Hai Kit-wai; Yau Chi-wai
- Music by: Raymond Wong; Daisuke Hinata; Jonathan Platt
- Production company: The Star Overseas
- Release date: 13 February 1999
- Running time: 90 minutes
- Country: Hong Kong
- Language: Cantonese
- Box office: HK$29,848,860 (US$3.85 million)

King of Comedy (Chinese: 喜劇之王) is a 1999 Hong Kong comedy film directed by Lee Lik-chi and Stephen Chow. The New King of Comedy, a remake set in mainland China, was released in 2019.

Unlike Chow's typical mo lei tau films, King of Comedy verges on comedy-drama, describing the trials and tribulation an aspiring actor experiences on his way to stardom. Some commentators say the story is based on Chow's early career, as he started off as a temporary actor, before becoming a successful and popular comedy actor over the course of a decade. The film features a short cameo by Jackie Chan, who also got his start as an extra.

== Plot ==
The film is a black comedy which tells the story of an actor who tries hard but cannot rise above being a movie extra.

Wan Tin-sau is the head of his village's community centre, where he gives acting lessons and host community plays. On the side, he is an aspiring actor moonlighting as a movie extra, often taking his work too seriously for the roles he receives.

One day, a group of club girls come to ask Wan to help them act like innocent schoolgirls so they can make more money. One of the girls, Lau Piu-piu, although skeptical of advice from an unsuccessful actor, becomes a better actress through Wan's instruction and falls in love with him.

When both characters finally make love, Wan searches his home for enough money to pay Piu-piu for her "services", since he thinks she slept with him for money. After Piu-piu leaves him in anger, he goes back to the film studio and receives a part as leading actor next to a legendary actress, Sister Cuckoo. During this time, Wan reconciles with Piu-piu and he pledges to support her for the rest of his life.

Just as Wan is about to settle in the life of a movie star, his part is given back to a highly sought after male lead. Luckily, he regains his confidence with the help of the misanthropic lunchman at the studio, who is secretly a C.I.B. agent. Wan is used in an undercover operation, where he is disguised as a delivery boy and made to deliver a hidden gun and listening device inside take-out food. Although the ruse is discovered and the C.I.B. undercover agent is shot, Wan takes up the gun and saves the day. The lunchman is rushed to the hospital and survives his wounds.

After a somewhat successful sting, Wan finally becomes famous through a performance of the Thunder Storm. The actors include Piu-piu, Sister Cuckoo, and his wanna-be Triad students. The end of the film involves a blatant marketing plug for Pringles brand potato chips. The entire cast of the play stands backstage rehearsing their lines while literally stuffing their mouths full of Pringles, with the logos of all five cans clearly facing towards the camera. At one point, Wan and one of his triad students argue over who should play the role of Bruce Lee's character, when another actor screams "don't fight, eat chips!" When the closing credits roll, a quick Pringles advertisement appears on the screen.

== Cast ==
- Stephen Chow as Wan Tin-sau
- Karen Mok as Sister Cuckoo / Cuckoo To
- Cecilia Cheung as Lau Piu-piu
- Ng Man-Tat as Mao
- Johnson Lee as Movie Director
- Tin Kai-man as student #3 / Hung's man
- Lee Siu-kei as Brothe Kei
- Jackie Chan (uncredited) as stunt double on set (cameo)
- Joe Cheng Cho as informer
- Lam Tsz-sin as Hung
- Cheng Man-Fai as Hung's man
- Steven Fung Min-Hang as Pui's first boyfriend
- Clarence Hui Yuen as nightclub mobster
- Baat Leung-Gam as Pierre
- Dai Lung as Master Lung
- Terence Tsui Chi-Hung as delivery boy
- Ben Yuen Foo-Wa as Ben
- Roderick Lam Chung-Kei as Kee
- Sunny Luk Kim-Ching as Johnny
- Hau Woon-Ling as Hung's granny
- Robert Sparks as Hollywood Producer
- Vincent Chik Miu-Chan as C.I.B
- Sherwin Ming Tak-Fung as hitman in the church
- Kong Foo-Keung as hitman in the church
- Choi Kwok-Ping as hitman in the church
- Tsim Siu-Ling as hitman in the church
- Chan Po-Chun as Peter
- Sin Yan-Kau
- Bruce Law Lai-Yin
- Mok Wai-Man

== Box office ==
In Hong Kong, the film opened over the Chinese New Year and grossed US$1.6 million in its opening week. It went on to gross HK$29,848,860 (US$3.85 million).

== Award nominations ==
Year	Award	Category	Nominee	Result
2000	19th Hong Kong Film Awards	Best New Performer	Cecilia Cheung	Nominated
