= Out of the Dark (1995 film) =

1995 Hong Kong film by Jeffrey Lau

- Film poster
- Traditional Chinese: 回魂夜
- Simplified Chinese: 回魂夜
- Hanyu Pinyin: Huí Hún Yè
- Jyutping: Wui4 Wan4 Je6
- Directed by: Jeffrey Lau
- Written by: Jeffrey Lau
- Produced by: Mona Fong
- Starring: Stephen Chow; Karen Mok; Bryan Leung; Wong Yat-fei; Lee Lik-chi; Carol Tam; Ben Wong
- Cinematography: Wong Chi-wai (H.K.S.C)
- Edited by: Kai Kit-wai
- Music by: Wu Wai-lap
- Distributed by: Cosmopolitan Film Productions
- Release dates: 30 June 1995 (Taiwan); 6 July 1995 (Hong Kong)
- Running time: 86 minutes
- Country: Hong Kong
- Language: Cantonese
- Box office: HK$16,281,325

Out of the Dark (回魂夜; literal translation: "Night of Returning Soul") is a 1995 Hong Kong comedy horror film directed by Jeffrey Lau, starring Stephen Chow and Karen Mok.

== Synopsis ==
Out of the Dark has earned a reputation as Stephen Chow's darkest film yet, adding brutal violence, gore, blood, and a wealth of black humour, including Chow's signature nonsense jokes.

The film is directed by Hong Kong director Jeffrey Lau. Chow plays Leo, a mental patient/ghostbuster who is a parody of the character Léon from the 1994 French film, The Professional, who talks to his plant for assistance, and co-starring Karen Mok as Kwan, a curious young girl who gets caught up with all the spooky situations. The pair are then joined by a brigade of quirky security guards in an attempt to get rid of the evil lurking in a supposedly haunted apartment building situated in Hong Kong.

== Cast ==
Sources:

- Stephen Chow as Leo
- Karen Mok as Kwan
- Bryan Leung as Mr. Wu
- Wong Yat-fei as Tit-dam, Security Guard
- Lee Lik-chi as a Security Guard
- Ben Wong as Keung
- Lee Kin-yan as Fat Cat
- Lam Suet as Eatery assistant
- Carol Tam as Mrs. Lee
- Lo Hung as Captain Lo
- Bruce Mang as Ming
- Chow Chi-fai as Mr. Lee
- Heung Dip as Beard/Chang
- Hau Woon-ling as Mr. Lee's dead mother
- Hui Si-man as Mrs. Cheung
- Wong Kam-tong as Kwan's father
- Bill Chan Wing-biu
- Wong Hei-yeung
- Jackson Ha Chak-san
