= The Final Combat =

- Promotional poster
- Also known as: 蓋世豪俠
- 蓋世豪俠
- Genre: Wuxia, Comedy
- Written by: Mok Shi Yee 莫淑娥; Chan Suk Yin 陳淑賢; Lee Lik Chi 李力持; Yip Kwong Yam 葉廣蔭; Sit Ga Wai 薛家華
- Directed by: Lau Ga Ho 劉嘉豪
- Starring: Stephen Chow; Francis Ng; Richard Ng; Jacqueline Law; Yammie Nam; Cutie Mui
- Opening theme: Small Timer 無名小卒 by David Lui 呂方
- Ending theme: Still in Love with You 始終愛你 by David Lui 呂方
- Country of origin: Hong Kong
- Original language: Cantonese
- No. of episodes: 30

Production
- Producer: Lau Ga Ho 劉嘉豪
- Production location: Hong Kong
- Camera setup: 45 minutes
- Production company: Television Broadcasts Limited

Original release
- Network: TVB Jade
- Release: 3 April – 12 May 1989

The Final Combat (simplified Chinese: 盖世豪侠; traditional Chinese: 蓋世豪俠; Jyutping: Koi Sai Ho Hap) is a 1989 Hong Kong TVB wuxia comedy drama series starring Stephen Chow, Richard Ng, Francis Ng, Jacqueline Law and Yammie Nam as the main cast . It aired on April 3, 1989, to May 12, 1989, with 30 episodes total. Chow also introduced his famous catch phrase "Sit down, drink a cup of tea, eat a bun, and talk slowly"「坐低飲啖茶，食個包」in this drama.

== Synopsis ==
Ku Fung and Duen Hoi, are apprentices under the Celestine Sect, must fight off their former sect brother Ku Yim Yeung. Ku Yim Yeung is also Ku Fung's twin brother, who has turned evil and women like due to learning the Maiden scripture and then formed his own Maiden Force cult. In order to stop his former disciple Yim Yeung, Fung and Duen's teacher took it upon himself to learn the Blissful scripture, but because this skill requires so much strength and power from the person using it they will die after only using the fighting move once. Not wanting his teacher to sacrifice his life because of his twin brother, Fung plots with Duen to steal the Blissful scripture and learn the skill himself so that he can defeat his own twin brother and his teacher will not die.

Fung and Hoi failed to get the scripture and Duen accidentally kills one of their own sect brothers in the process of trying to steal it from their teacher. Fung is framed for the death of the sect brother, while trying to escape his sect brothers who are after him now for a murder they think he committed. Fung falls down a cliff and is presumed dead. Duen, feeling guilty for what has happened, raises Fung's son Yuk Lau as his own, but in the process neglects the upbringing of his own son Duen Fei. Yuk Lau grows up to be a filial son and good at martial arts where as Duen Fei grows up to be mischievous and hates martial arts. Yuk Lau meets Suet An who is a disciple of Ku Yim Yeung and falls in love with her. Yuk Lau becomes power hungry and uses Suet to try to get the Maiden scripture. Yuk Lau eventually gets the Maiden scripture through a sorceress who had stolen it from Ku Yim Yeung. Yuk Lau learns the fighting skills from the Maiden scripture and becomes like Ku Yim Yeung. He takes over the Maiden Force cult from Ku Yim Yeung, in order to stop his adopted brother Duen Fei must learn the Blissful scripture.

== Cast ==
=== Main cast ===
- Stephen Chow as Duen Fei 段飛

The main protagonist of the story. Duen Hoi's son and Yuk Lau's adopted younger brother. His mother died when he was young. Due to his father's guilt of the death of his sect brother he was neglected while growing up. He hates martial arts and loves mischief. He meets Ku Fung when he ran away from home. Had a crush on Suet An but learns to love and marries Lee Ju later on.

- Ng Man-tat as Ku Yim Yeung 古艷陽 & Ku Fung 古峰

Ku Yim Yeung - Former disciple of the Celestine Sect. Ku Fung's older twin brother. Due to being power hungry he learns the Maiden scripture and becomes lady like and evil. Forms his own cult. Lee Ju's biological father. Lee Gil's former husband.
Ku Fung - Celestine Sect disciple. . Yuk Lau biological father. He feels guilty and his sect brothers don't trust him because his twin Ku Yim Yeung who was part of the Celestine Sect had turned evil after learning the Maiden scripture. He gets framed for the death of a sect brother Hoi accidentally killed.

- Francis Ng as Duen Yuk Lau 段玉樓

Duen Fei's adopted older brother. Ku Fung's biological son. Due to Duen Hoi's guilt on causing the assumed death of Ku Fung he adopts Yuk Lau and raises him as his own. He is a filial son and good at martial arts but due to being power hungry he is willing to turn against anyone. He loves Suet An but due to his hunger for power he uses her to try to get the Maiden scripture.

- Jacqueline Law as Lee Ju 李珠

Ku Yim Yeung and Lee Gil's daughter. She manages a wine shop with her mother. She doesn't know that Ku Yim Yeung is her biological father because her mother had left her father and took her with her when he was learning the Maiden scripture. At first she hated Duen Fei because of his prank on her as it caused her almost-to-be spouse to cancel her earlier arranged marriage. She later falls in love with Duen Fei and marries him.

- Yammie Nam as Suet An 雪雁

She's an orphan that Ku Yim Yeung took in and raised as a disciple. She was a filial disciple until she met and fell in love with Duen Yuk Lau. Ku Yim Yeung knowing of her relationship with Yuk Lau banishes her from the Maiden Force cult.

=== Supporting cast ===
- Cutie Mui as Ah Lan
- Lau Kong as Duen Hoi
- Lily Li as Lee Kiu
- Lee Hin Ming (李顯明) as Ah Wah
- Derek Kok as Ah Bil
- Kwan Hoi San as Tung Oh Tin
- Ko Miu Si (高妙思) as Ku Fung's wife
- Chan Ga Yin (陳嘉賢) as Ah Yin
- Chan Dik Hak as Yeung Sum
- Lee Yiu Ging as Ah Fai
- Raymond Tsang as Ah Bun
- Eddie Ko as Ai Ding Shan
- Brian Wong as Ai Lap Bong
- Benz Hui as Chin Man Lee
- Wong Wai Tak
- Lau Man Chun (劉文俊)
- Cheng Ka Sang as Ju Sing Cheung
- Wilson Tsui as Han Mo Ki
- Yip Bik Won (葉碧雲) as Hau Yi
- Jatfei Wong as Tin Pang
- Wong Sing Seung (黃成想)
- Chan Ga Bik (陳家碧)
- Lam Ga Lai (林嘉麗)
- Lee Gui Ying (李桂英)
- Wong Fung King
- Lam Yin Ming
- Evergreen Mak
- Bobby Tsang
- Han Jun (韓俊)
- Chu Kong (朱剛)
- Stella Wong as Chiu Hung
- Teresa Carpio (杜麗莎)
- Chan Wai Yu (陳恵瑜)
- Ng Bok Kwan
- Cho Chai (曹濟)
- Mak Chi Won as Won Chung Long
- Yu Tin Wai
- Chan Min Leung
- Kwong Ming Fai (江明輝)
- Gordon Lam as the prince's guard
- Bak Man Bil (白文彪)
- Yu Ming (俞明)
- Ma Hing Sung as General Wu
- Chan On Ying as Ah Fan 阿芬
- Ling Lai Man
- Bau Fong as Happy Elder
