= The Lucky Guy =

1998 Hong Kong film by Lee Lik-chi

- Film poster
- Directed by: Lee Lik-Chi
- Written by: Lee Lik-Chi; Man-Fai Cheng
- Starring: Stephen Chow; Eric Kot; Daniel Chan; Sammi Cheng; Kristy Yang; Shu Qi; Ng Man Tat
- Cinematography: Cheng Siu-Keung
- Edited by: Cheung Ka-Fai
- Music by: Dennie Wong; Shu Man
- Distributed by: Cameron Entertainment Co. Ltd.
- Release date: 16 January 1998
- Running time: 100 minutes
- Country: Hong Kong
- Languages: Cantonese; Mandarin
- Box office: HK$27,387,890.00

The Lucky Guy (Chinese: 行運一條龍) is a 1998 Hong Kong comedy film directed by Lee Lik-Chi (李力持) and starring Stephen Chow, Sammi Cheng (鄭秀文), Daniel Chan (陳曉東) and Shu Qi.

== Synopsis ==
"Lucky" Coffee Shop, a Cha Chaan Teng, is well known for its egg tarts and tea. Waiter Sui, named as Prince Egg Tart, attracts many girls but only loves Candy. He and his friends, Nam, and Fok, all have love problems. At the same time, the coffee shop may collapse since the landlord is increasing the rent tremendously.

== Cast and roles ==
- Stephen Chow – Ho Kam Sui (Prince Egg-Tart)
- Ng Man-tat (吳孟達) – Mr. Li
- Eric Kot (葛民輝) – Fook
- Daniel Chan – Ah Nam (Shin Chan)
- Sammi Cheng – Candy Yip Yuk Fun
- Kristy Yang – Fanny
- Shu Qi – Fon Fon
- Vincent Kok
- Sandra Ng
- Lee Kin-yan
- Lee Siu-kei
- Tin Kai Man
- Wong Jing
- Wong Yut Fei
- Joyce Chan
