= The Magnificent Scoundrels =

1991 Hong Kong film by Lee Lik-chi

- Film poster
- Traditional Chinese: 情聖
- Simplified Chinese: 情圣
- Hanyu Pinyin: Qíng Shèng
- Jyutping: Cing4 Sing3
- Directed by: Lee Lik-chi
- Screenplay by: Edward Leung Yiu-ming; Lee Lik-chi (李力持)
- Story by: Wellington Fung; Chan kwok-tse Ma Chang-yat
- Produced by: Danny Lee; Karl Maka
- Starring: Stephen Chow; Teresa Mo; Tien Niu; Amy Yip; Wu Ma; Roy Cheung; Yuen Wah; Mimi Chu; Karl Maka; Sandra Ng
- Cinematography: Abdul Rumjohnn
- Edited by: Ma Cheung-yiu
- Music by: Richard Lo
- Production companies: Magnum Films; Cinema City & Films Co. Cinema City Enterprises
- Distributed by: Golden Princess Amusement
- Release date: 10 October 1991
- Running time: 96 minutes
- Country: Hong Kong
- Language: Cantonese
- Box office: HK$16,548,021

The Magnificent Scoundrels (情聖) is a 1991 Hong Kong comedy film directed by Lee Lik-chi and starring Stephen Chow, Teresa Mo, Tien Niu, Amy Yip, Wu Ma, Roy Cheung, Yuen Wah and Mimi Chu, with special appearances by Karl Maka and Sandra Ng.

== Plot ==
Romeo (Stephen Chow) is a mediocre con artist who crosses paths with Betsy Kwan (Teresa Mo), a fellow con artist. Together they impersonate various people and create numerous schemes to make money. Meanwhile, gangsters are making a scheme of their own.

== Cast and roles ==
- Stephen Chow as Romeo / Ching Sing
- Teresa Mo as Betsy Kwan
- Tien Niu as Ping
- Amy Yip as Apple / Bor-bor
- Wu Ma as Fatt
- Roy Cheung as Brother Tai-te
- Yuen Wah as Brother Wah
- Mimi Chu as Black magic master
- Karl Maka as Master (special appearance)
- Sandra Ng as Jenny Chen (special appearance)
- Gabriel Wong as Driver in car crash
- Kwai Chung as Arm-wrestler
- Chan Yuet-yue as One of Master's wives
