= Love on Delivery =

1994 Hong Kong film by Lee Lik-chi

- Film poster
- Directed by: Lee Lik-Chi
- Written by: Vincent Kok
- Produced by: Mona Fong; Wong Jing
- Starring: Stephen Chow; Christy Chung; Ng Man Tat; Philip Chan; Joe Cheng
- Cinematography: David Chung
- Edited by: Ma Chung-Yiu; Chu San-Kit
- Music by: William Wu Wai-Lap
- Production companies: Cosmopolitan Film Productions Co., Ltd. Shaw Brothers Studio
- Release date: 3 February 1994
- Running time: 100 minutes
- Country: Hong Kong
- Languages: Cantonese; Mandarin

Love on Delivery (破壞之王; aka. King of Destruction) is a 1994 Hong Kong comedy film starring Stephen Chow and directed by Lee Lik-Chi.

== Plot ==
Ho Kam-ang (Stephen Chow), a weak, disadvantaged but kind lunch delivery boy, happens to fall in love with Lily (Christy Chung), the girl of his dreams from a local fitness center. However, his dream is crushed after Judo master Black Bear, who also admires Lily, intervenes a date between them. That night, in a brutally straightforward fashion, Lily tells Ho that she dislikes weak and pathetic men.

After being further humiliated at the fitness center by Black Bear, Ho seeks shelter at a convenience shop owned by Gwai-wong Tat (Ng Man Tat), an eccentric handicap. Tat promises to teach Ang kung-fu to cure him of his weakness and cowardice, in exchange for money. In fact, however, Tat is merely a swindler taking advantage of Ho's gullibility, and teaches Ho useless, fantasy kung fu techniques.

Later, when Ho loses his job and runs out of money, he tells Tat he will follow him for life. Tat attempts to rid of him by persuading him to use a false technique called "The Invincible Windfire Spin," a move that will certainly seriously injure anyone – which involves holding onto the enemy and rolling down a huge flight of stairs, using the enemy to soften all the blows of the stairs. Ho is considering implementing the move, but decides against it. However, he becomes reassured of this so-called technique when he witnesses Tat himself falling down the stairs and surviving it, though that was an accident. Emboldened, Ho thanks Tat and leaves.

Determined to change Lily's views about him, Ho comes to Lily's rescue when Black Bear tries to force her to be his girlfriend after Lily rejected him at the parking lot. He wears a Garfield mask a'la superhero. After a scuffle, Ho manages to defeat Black Bear by using the "Spin". The next day, Ho tries to tell Lily that it was he who saved her, but before he can do it, Lily introduces her ex-schoolmate Dai-si-hing, a karate champion from Japan who lies that he is the "Garfield Warrior" who saved Lily. Infuriated, Ho plans on challenging Dai Si-hing to a combat match to prove his mettle. Upon seeing Tat at the garbage dump, he drags him along to the fitness centre with a challenge proposal.

However, Ho and Tat, upon arriving, unexpectedly sees Dai-si-hing effortlessly defeating a Taekwondo master, a Kendo master, a boxer and Black Bear together. Frightened, Ho and Tat wants to retract the challenge, but Dai-si-hing manages to get the letter first and accepts it, while revealing that Tat is in fact a world-renowned martial arts champion and has defeated many karate masters in tournaments, only until Dai-si-hing's sensei broke his leg in a match in Japan, which left Tat living in obscurity ever since. To redeem himself, Tat promises to prepare Ho for the match against Dai Si-hing after receiving one month's training. In a side bet made by Tat, if Ho can survive all three rounds, kung fu will regain its public image at the center. The upcoming match receives much publicity and reporters follow Ho and Tat, wanting to see how a delivery boy can be transformed to a rival martial artist. To everyone's amusement and puzzlement, Ho and Tat are only seen partying and eating. When asked, Tat replies that this is their training, unnerving many.

On the day of the match, Lily, worrying for Ho's life, rushes to the stadium to cancel it, but is stranded in a malfunctioning elevator. At the boxing ring, Ho is voted the odds-on favourite to win by the judges because of his lack of fear, which ironically increases Dai-si-hing's own trepidation. As the match commences with round one, Dai-si-hing rushes in to attack, but stops abruptly when Ho simply turns around and keeps still to confuse him. In the second round, Tat instructs Ho to wear down Dai-si-hing with submissions and sucker punches while deliberately distracts him by juggling things in the air. A commercial break ends round two.

In the third round, Ho surprisingly grapples and locks him with the "Golden Snake Restraint" technique. Visibly irate, Dai-si-hing unsuccessfully tries to throw Ho off. Finally, round three ends, and Duan is announced the winner, though Ho wins the cheers since he survives the match. Incensed, Dai-si-hing starts ravaging the place, beating up even the referee and judges. To stop him, Ho decides to use the "Invincible Wind and Fire Spin" on him, using an immense lottery wheel as help. The two spin wildly inside the wheel, and it explodes. Out of the rubble emerges Ho, exhausted but victorious, and Duan collapses in defeat. Lily, realising Ho is the "Garfield warrior," rushes over to kiss him, and Tat reintroduces kung fu to the public.

== Cast and roles ==
- Stephen Chow as Ho Kam-ang (何金銀 or 阿銀)
- Christy Chung – Lily (阿麗)
- Ng Man-tat – Gwai-wong Tat (鬼王达), Ho's master and a former wushu fighter
- Ben Lam – Dai Si-hing (大師兄, aka. the number-one schoolmate), the best fighter of Dyunsui Liu (断水流), a fictional style of karate
- Philip Chan – Television commercial pitchman
- Joe Cheng – Black bear, a Judo master
- Jacky Cheung – himself (cameo)
- Joey Leung - ringside commentator
- Billy Chow – Taekwando master
- Paul Chun – Chan, the Principal of Elite Center
- Vincent Kok – Niu
- Wong Yut Fei – Ho's boss
- Leo Ku
- Lee Lik-Chi
- Radium Cheung
- Peter Lai – Customer with a fly in his soup
- Gabriel Wong – Turtle

== Trivia ==
- Jacky Cheung has a cameo appearance as himself, in which he gives away the best seat tickets to Ho.
- The introduction scene of Ho is a parody of the Terminator, in which he walks naked (since he gave away his clothes to a beggar as an act of kindness) in a street before being taken away by police.
- Christy Chung couldn't speak a word of Cantonese during the time of filming, so all of her Cantonese dialogue was dubbed.
- Lau's glasses and haircut parody Clark Kent (Superman).
- Tat performs Spacium Beam, known as Killing Cross, used by Ultraman.
- The 1996 Malaysian film Siapa Dia was based on this film.
