= Lawyer Lawyer =

1997 Hong Kong film by Joe Ma

- Film poster

Chinese name
- Traditional Chinese: 算死草
- Jyutping: syun3 sei2 cou2
- Directed by: Joe Ma
- Written by: Joe Ma; Wong Ho-Wa
- Produced by: Joe Ma
- Starring: Stephen Chow; Eric Kot; Karen Mok; Chingmy Yau
- Cinematography: Cheung Man-Po
- Edited by: Cheung Ka-Fai; Kong Chi-Leung
- Music by: Lincoln Lo
- Distributed by: Cameron Entertainment
- Release date: 1 August 1997
- Running time: 85 minutes
- Country: Hong Kong
- Language: Cantonese

Lawyer Lawyer (Chinese: 算死草; Jyutping: syun3 sei2 cou2; lit. 'compute death weed') is a 1997 Hong Kong comedy film produced, directed and co-written by Joe Ma.

== Plot ==
Stephen Chow stars as Chan Mong-Gut, a famous Chinese lawyer who was killed in the Qing dynasty. He must defend his apprentice, Foon, who has been framed for murder in Hong Kong. Being the third worst lawyer in China, he challenges the British legal system with no evidence on hand and manages to identify the killer in a hilarious way.

== Cast ==
- Stephen Chow as Chan Mong-Gut (credited Steven Chow)
- Eric Kot as Foon
- Karen Mok
- Chingmy Yau
- Law Kar-ying (credited as Law Ka Ying)
- Cheung Tat Ming
- Vincent Kok
- Tats Lau (credited as Lau Yee Tat)
- Paul Fonoroff
- Bowie Lam
- Spencer Lam (credited as Lam Sheung Yee)
- Lee Siu-kei (credited as Lee Siu Kee)
- Simon Lui
- Wyman Wong
- Moses Chan
- Chung King Fai
- Bobby Yip (credited as Bat Leung Gam)
- Lee Kin Yan
- Quinton Wong (credited as Quin Tin Wong)
- Madam Nancy
- Tin Kai Man

== Political themes ==
The film was released during the same year as the transfer of sovereignty over Hong Kong. As the film deals specifically with the issue of justice, it can be interpreted as responding to the fears of the PRC takeover and to the general uncertainty of what that meant to the people of Hong Kong, as long as you ignore the content of the movie itself, which implicates the UK as the source of injustice. The film promotes a normative vision of justice that can prevail over any tyranny, suggesting that knowledge of law, and the freedom to express it, is more important than brute strength (as embodied by the trials and tribulations of Chang Mong-Gut over countless foes).
