= Flirting Scholar =

1993 Hong Kong film by Lee Lik-chi

- Film poster
- Directed by: Lee Lik-chi
- Written by: Wen-Qiang Chen; Lee Lik-Chi; Vincent Kok
- Produced by: Charles Heung; Stephen Shiu
- Starring: Stephen Chow; Gong Li; Natalis Chan; Bryan Leung; Cheng Pei-pei; Liu Chia Hui
- Cinematography: David Chung; Peter Ngor
- Edited by: Ma Chung-Yiu
- Music by: William Hu
- Production company: Win's Movie Production Ltd.
- Release date: 1 July 1993 (Hong Kong)
- Running time: 102 minutes
- Country: Hong Kong
- Language: Cantonese
- Box office: HK$40.17 million

Flirting Scholar (Cantonese: 唐伯虎點秋香; Jyutping: tong⁴ baak³ fu² dim² cau¹ heong¹) is a 1993 Hong Kong comedy film directed by Lee Lik-Chi. It parodies famous works of literature which feature the same characters and settings.

The title is itself a pun. The phrase "點秋香" means "to light Autumn incense", but as "秋香" is the actual name of a character, the title can also mean "courts Chow Heung".

== Plot ==
In the Ming Dynasty, there were four scholars, whose literary and artistic skills are unmatched in China. Tong Pak Fu (Stephen Chow) is the most famous, for having eight wives in addition to his expertise as an artist, poet, and calligrapher. However, Tong's wives are all gambling addicts and unappreciative of Tong's artistic skills. This leads to Tong's quest for a woman who can truly appreciate his strengths.

The Tong Family comes from a pedigree of martial arts masters. They have two major enemies: the Evil Scholar, a notorious swordsman known for The Deadly Scholastic Sword (書生奪命劍), and an evil ex-girlfriend of his father's. Due to these rivalries, Tong Pak Fu is forbidden by his mother to use any form of martial arts.

One day, Tong stumbles upon the convoy of the House of Wah and meets Chow Heung ("Autumn Fragrance") (Gong Li), one of the four maids in the House of Wah (Who are named after the four seasons). This chance encounter convinces Tong that he has finally found his true love. On the advice of a boatman, Tong pretends to be a lowly servant 9527 in order to gain employment in the House of Wah.

Tong finds life as a servant very difficult, until after a night incident (which involved the saving of Chow Heung from rape by the Wolf gang), Madame Wah (Cheng Pei-pei) discovers that Tong is actually educated. After some persuasion by Chow Heung, Tong is hired as an assistant tutor for Madame Wah's two young sons, Madame Wah named him as Washington but Tong insisted use lower status name and Madame Wah named him as Wah On. After the accidental death of the main tutor of the House of Wah, Tong is promoted to senior tutor and manages to get closer to Chow Heung.

The House of Wah is then suddenly visited by Chancellor Wah's political rival, Prince Ning, who is planning a coup. During the visit Prince Ning shows off a painting of Tong Pak Fu. Slowly the showing turns violent as the Evil Scholar, now a subordinate under Prince Ning, fights and injures Madam Wah. Tong steps in to stop the battle but, in turn, destroys the Tong Pak Fu painting Prince Ning brought. Prince Ning seizes the opportunity to blame the House of Wah for insulting him and destroying the painting. Tong quickly grabs Chow Heung, lies to Prince Ning that the painting they had was a fake and the real one is in the Wah House. Chow Heung attempts to recreate the painting in the study to pacify the situation, but doubts that her painting skills can fool Prince Ning. While she was rambling, Tong completed a re-creation of the painting. Prince Ning doubts the painting, but has his own scholar verify that is it indeed a Tong Pak Fu painting and not a fake. Embarrassed Prince Ning leaves hastily and vows to kill the entire House of Wah.

However, in reproducing a painting and fighting off the Evil Scholar, Madame Wah is able to deduce Tong's true identity and poisons him. It is then revealed that Madame Wah was the former love rival of Tong's mother and still hold grudges against his father. With his strength nullified, Tong is then held prisoner in the Wah's tinder room.

Several days later, the Evil Scholar returns to annihilate the entire House of Wah. Madame Wah attempts to defend the family but is almost killed. At the last minute, Tong appears and, after a fierce battle, kills the Evil Scholar. As a reward, the House of Wah gives Tong Chow Heung's hand in marriage. Tong then discovers that Chow Heung is just as much a gambling addict as his other eight wives.

== Cast ==
- Stephen Chow - Tong Pak-Fu / Pak-Fu's father
- Gong Li - Chow-Heung
- Natalis Chan - Chuck Chi-Shan
- Bryan Leung - Mo Chong-Yuen
- Cheng Pei-pei - Madame Wah
- Gordon Liu - Evil Scholar
- Francis Ng - Member of The Four Scholars
- Vincent Kok - Tu Chuen-Chang
- Wong Jim - Chancellor Wah
- Mimi Zhu - Chussy
- Yuen King-Tan - Shek-Lau
- Lee Kin-yan - ladyboy robber
- Jessica Hsuan - Ha-Heung
- Joey Leung Wing-Chung - poor man (cameo)
- Peter Lai - teacher
- Lam Wai - Prince Ning
- Carol Wan - Tung-Heung
- Gabriel Wong - Wah-Man
- Dickson Lee Ga-Sing - Wah-Mo
- Yammie Lam - one of the eight wives
- Chan Fai-hung - one of four scholars
- Chu Tiet-Wo- Ning's envoy
- Ku Ting-Yi - Chun-Heung
- Chang Kin-Ming - Fu's servant
- Ling Hon - doctor

== Release and reception ==
Flirting Scholar was released in Hong Kong on 1 July 1993. It grossed a total of HK $40.17 million at the 1993 Hong Kong box office. It was only outgrossed by Jurassic Park (1993). Derek Elley commented that this was the first time since the release of E.T. the Extra-Terrestrial (1982) that an American film was the highest grossing film at the year-end Hong Kong box office.

In a retrospective review from 2023 in the Chinese newspaper The Paper, an anonymous reviewer described the film as "the pinnacle of nonsensical comedy" and that, as Stephen Chow's later films grew more profound or animated, it de-emphasized the comedy and made it less entertaining. They found the pairing of Stephen Chow and Gong Li as having acting styles that were in contrast to each other, as Gong Li was known for more serious minded films of the period, like The Story of Qiu Ju and Farewell My Concubine.

== See also ==
- The Three Smiles, a 1969 Huangmei opera film based on the same story
