= Stephen Chow =

Hong Kong actor and filmmaker (born 1962)

- 周星馳
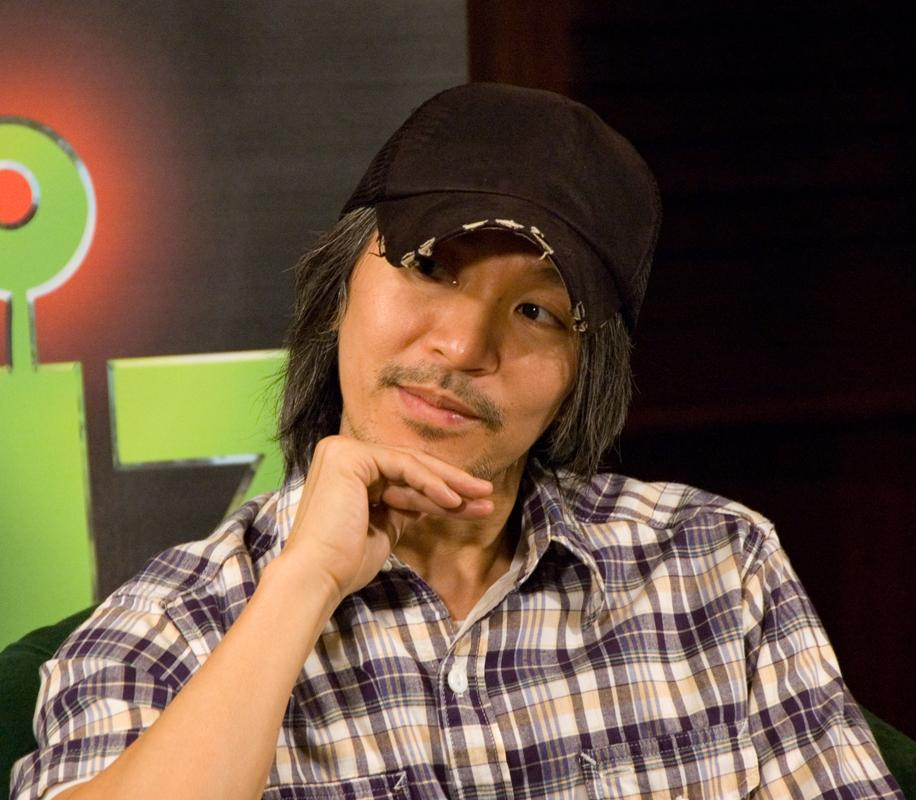
- Chow in 2008
- Born: Stephen Chow Sing-chi; 22 June 1962 (age 64); British Hong Kong
- Occupations: Director, actor, comedian, screenwriter, producer
- Years active: As an actor: 1982–2008; As a director: 1994–present

Chinese name
- Traditional Chinese: 周星馳
- Simplified Chinese: 周星驰
Transcriptions
Standard Mandarin
- Hanyu Pinyin: Zhōu Xīngchí
- Bopomofo: ㄓㄡ ㄒㄧㄥ ㄔˊ
Yue: Cantonese
- Yale Romanization: Jāu Sīng-chìh
- Jyutping: Zau1 Sing1-ci4
- IPA: [tsɐ́u séŋ.tsʰȉ]

Stephen Chow Sing-chi (Note: Chinese: 周星馳; pinyin: Zhōu Xīngchí; Jyutping: Zau1 Sing1-ci4; Cantonese Yale: Jāu Sīng-chìh) (born 22 June 1962) is a Hong Kong filmmaker and former actor, known for his mo lei tau comedy, which has a significant influence on Chinese popular culture. His career began in television, where he gained recognition through variety shows and TV dramas. Chow's breakthrough came in 1989 with the comedy dramas The Final Combat and The Justice of Life, the latter marking the beginning of his on-screen collaboration with Ng Man-tat. He consecutively broke Hong Kong’s box office records in the next two years with films All for the Winner (1990) and Fight Back to School (1991), cementing his status as one of the region's most popular actors.

Since the early 1990s, Chow began working as a screenwriter and director, serving as a de facto director for Flirting Scholar (1993) before receiving his first directorial credit with From Beijing with Love (1994). His first two attempts at Hong Kong–mainland co-productions, Flirting Scholar and A Chinese Odyssey (1995), received mixed reviews and underperformed at the box office in both markets upon release. However, they gained popularity over time, and by the 2000s, A Chinese Odyssey had particularly elevated his status as a cultural icon in China.

In 2001, he directed and starred in Shaolin Soccer (2001), which brought him international recognition, furthered by Kung Fu Hustle (2004). His final on-screen performance was in CJ7 (2008), after which he transitioned fully to filmmaking, achieving great success with comedies such as Journey to the West (2013) and The Mermaid (2016).

== Early life and education ==
Stephen Chow was born in Hong Kong on 22 June 1962 to Ling Po-yee (凌寶兒), an alumna of Guangzhou Normal University, and Chow Yik-sheung (周驛尚), an immigrant from Ningbo, Zhejiang. Chow has an elder sister named Chow Man-kei (周文姬) and a younger sister named Chow Sing-ha (周星霞). Chow's given name "Sing-chi" (星馳) derives from Tang dynasty (618–907) Chinese poet Wang Bo's essay Preface to the Prince of Teng's Pavilion. After his parents divorced when he was seven, Chow was raised by his mother. Chow attended Heep Woh Primary School, a missionary school attached to the Hong Kong Council of the Church of Christ in China in Prince Edward Road, Kowloon Peninsula. When he was nine, he saw Bruce Lee's film The Big Boss, which inspired him to become a martial arts star. Chow entered San Marino Secondary School, where he studied alongside Lee Kin-yan. After graduation, he joined the TVB's acting classes.

== Career ==
=== 1982–1987: Early television career ===
Chow began his career as an extra for Rediffusion Television. Around 1980 he applied for TVB's famous artist training course alongside his friend, Tony Leung Chiu-wai. Leung Chiu-wai won a place in the class, but Chow was rejected and became an office assistant for a shipping company, a job he describes as "so boring." A year later, his friend and neighbor, Jaime Chik Mei-jan, a veteran of the previous year's training course, put in a word for Chow and he was admitted to the 1982 training class.

He captured the attention of the public as host of the TVB Jade children's program 430 Space Shuttle. He stayed with the show for five years. Producer and actor Danny Lee signed him to a two year contract with his company, Magnum Films, and cast him in a supporting role in the crime drama Final Justice (1988), which won him the Golden Horse Award for Best Supporting Actor at the Golden Horse Awards.

=== 1988–2000: Rise to prominence ===
For the next two years, Chow capitalized on that success, working non-stop. He shot to further television stardom in the TVB wuxia series The Final Combat (1989). In addition to shooting the 30 episodes of The Final Combat, he also appeared in 12 feature films during that same period, most of them triad movies, action films, or dramas. Jeff Lau directed him in the police thriller Thunder Cops II (1989) and remembered him in early 1990 when producer Ng See-yuen tried to capitalize on the success of the previous year's hit Chow Yun-fat vehicle God of Gamblers. Chow would not return to shoot a sequel and so, sensing a hole in the marketplace, Ng hired Jeff Lau to direct a parody. Remembering his work with Stephen Chow, Lau hired him to star, pairing him with Sharla Cheung (who would appear as Chow's co-star in 12 more films) and Ng Man-tat, a big star in the Seventies before a gambling addiction wrecked his career. He was then trying to make a comeback as a character actor.

All for the Winner (1990) became the highest grossing Hong Kong film of all time and the number one film for the year. Wong Jing hired Chow to star in the official sequels God of Gamblers II (1990) and God of Gamblers III: Back to Shanghai (1991) sequels which Wong wrote and directed (Chow Yun-fat would return to the role he made famous in 1994's God of Gamblers Return, also written and directed by Wong). Lau had vowed never to work with Stephen Chow again after All for the Winner and so when it came time to make the sequel to that hit, Stephen Chow only appeared in a brief cameo.

After All for the Winner, Chow had two more major hits, God of Gamblers II and Tricky Brains, which grossed HK$40 million and HK$31 million respectively at the box office, but they were followed by what appeared to be a fall from grace as the sequel to All for the Winner, The Top Bet, under-performed at the local box office, and his next films Legend of the Dragon and Fist of Fury 1991 failed to crack the HK$25 million barrier. City Entertainment magazine reported that Chow's career was over and he was repeating himself after the hit that was All for the Winner. Win's Entertainment courted writer and director Gordon Chan to helm Chow's next project, Fight Back to School (1991). Chan claims he was unsatisfied with the script and rewrote the film as an outline with 15 bullet points and the rest of the movie was improvised. The result was a movie that cast Chow in a heroic lead role and the result was HK$43 million at the local box office, a new franchise (there would be sequels in 1992 and 1993), and in what's considered a local benchmark of success, it represented the first time Chow unseated Jackie Chan from the number one spot at the Hong Kong box office.

Over the next decade, Chow appeared in more than 40 films, and wound up taking the number one spot at the box office eight times over the course of his career. Often, more than one of his movies would appear in the top ten, as in 1992 when all five of the top spots were held by Chow's films (Jackie Chan would not retake the number one spot until 1995).

In 1994, Chow teamed up with director Lee Lik-chi and writer Vincent Kok for Love On Delivery, a movie that would only be the sixth highest-grossing movie of the year, a significant step down in status. Fortunately, Chow re-teamed with Kok and Lee again that same year for a James Bond parody he's credited as co-writing and co-directing, and From Beijing with Love became the number three movie at the annual box office, beaten only by Chow Yun-fat's return to the God of Gamblers franchise and Jackie Chan's return to the character of a young Wong Fei-hung in Drunken Master II, a character he'd last played in 1978 in the first Drunken Master.

Around this time, Chow established his own film production company, Choi Sing Company (variously translated as Caixing Film Company and Hong Kong Color Star Film Company), and approached Jeff Lau about writing and directing his next movie. Lau told Chow that if he kept making the same movie over and over again he would never find popularity with female audiences and he needed to play a romantic lead. In a hotel meeting, he pitched Chow on filming a two-part adaptation of the classic Chinese novel, Journey to the West, and Chow agreed. In order to shoot on Mainland locations the movie became a Mainland-Hong Kong co-production between Chow's Choi Sing Company and Xi'an Film Studios. The remote Xi'an Studios had always encouraged innovation and become home to China's celebrated wave of Fifth Generation arthouse directors like Zhang Yimou and Chen Kaige and they were reluctant to work with a commercial, Hong Kong production. However, recent cuts in government subsidies forced them to look for new sources of financing and they embraced the co-production model. The resulting shoot was chaotic, with the Hong Kong crew speaking only Cantonese and the Mainland crew speaking Mandarin. Actors like Lu Shuming and Wu Yujin said they had very little idea of what was going on and actor Law Kar-ying described Chow as "arrogant." The two films were titled A Chinese Odyssey Part One - Pandora's Box and A Chinese Odyssey Part Two - Cinderella and released in January and February, 1995 where they underperformed at the box office, leading to Choi Sing Film Company declaring bankruptcy. Chow, however, earned substantial money from the movie over the years through licensing and advertising opportunities and in the late '90s and early 2000s it became a cult favorite in the Mainland with phrases, expressions, and memes from the two films becoming a foundational part of early Chinese internet culture. This also became known in part as the Stephen Chow Phenomenon (周星驰现象).

=== 2001–2008: International stardom ===
In 2001, his film Shaolin Soccer grossed over US$50 million worldwide. Chow won Best Director and Best Actor at the 2002 Hong Kong Film Awards, and the film went on to garner additional awards including a Blue Ribbon Awards for Best Foreign Language Film and the Golden Bauhinia Award for Best Picture and Best Director. It was the highest-grossing domestic film in Hong Kong at the time, grossing $46 million in the Asia region.

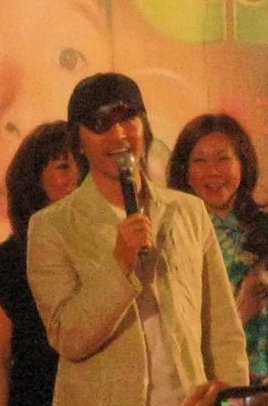
Chow promoting CJ7 in Malaysia (2008)

In 2004, his film Kung Fu Hustle grossed over US$106 million worldwide. Chow also won Best Director at the Taiwan Golden Horse Awards and Best Picture of Imagine Film Festival as well as over twenty international awards. Comedian Bill Murray said that the film was "the supreme achievement of the modern age in terms of comedy".

His final role film CJ7 began filming in July 2006 in the eastern Chinese port of Ningbo. In August 2007, the film was given the title CJ7, a play on China's successful Shenzhou crewed space missions—Shenzhou 5 and Shenzhou 6.

For his work in comedy, he has received praise from notable institutions such as the Brooklyn Academy of Music, which has called him the King of Comedy.

=== 2009–present: Focus on directing ===
In 2010, he became the executive director and major shareholder of Bingo Group.

In 2013, his film Journey to the West: Conquering the Demons was the highest-grossing Chinese film of all time.

In 2016, his film The Mermaid broke numerous box office records, and became the highest-grossing film of 2016 in China. The Mermaid was released in Vietnam on 10 February 2016. On 14 March, it became the third-highest-grossing film of all time in Vietnam. It has now grossed over US$553.81 million worldwide. Chow became the ninth-top-grossing Hollywood director in 2016.

Chow spent 4 years writing, directing and producing the remake of his 1999 film King of Comedy, the film was titled The New King of Comedy, released in February 2019.

In 2026, Chow's film Kung Fu Soccer, where he makes a cameo in the end, was released.

== Personal life ==
Chow and Jacqueline Law met while filming the TV series The Final Combat in 1989 and began dating shortly thereafter. In the autumn of 1992, they broke up. Law later struggled with depression and recalled mentioning marriage to Chow, only to be dismissed as “crazy,” which left her heartbroken: “I longed to start a family with him, but he treated me like a lunatic.” Years later, when Law announced she had cancer, Chow was working on Journey to the West: Conquering the Demons. Among other memorial references, he named the film’s female lead Miss Duan, referencing The Final Combat, where Chow and Law portrayed Mr. and Mrs. Duan. The film premiered after Law's death.

Chow and Athena Chu started dating after working together on Fight Back to School. Their secret relationship lasted for more than three years, ending due to Chow's alleged infidelity. In a 2008 interview on Be My Guest, Chu recalled the breakup: "One day, after wrapping up work, I went to visit my boyfriend’s room. The door was locked, and when he opened it, he looked flustered. I touched the bed, and it was warm, while the bathroom door was locked from the inside." Chu stated that she didn't know who the other person was and suspected there were more than just one. Despite this, Chu continued to work alongside Chow until the film finished. Karen Mok, the often suspected mistress at the time, denied being involved with anyone during the filming of A Chinese Odyssey. According to Tiffany Chen, however, during the filming Chow had relationships with Yammie Lam, Chu and Mok. From 1995 to 1998, Chow had a public relationship with Mok, who starred alongside him in several films.

Chow had a relationship with Alice Yu Man-fung, daughter of business mogul Yu Ching-Po, for 12 to 13 years until March 2010, during which Yu also assisted Chow with personal investments and was paid a salary based on a written contract from 2002, initially at HK$20,000 a month. Chow had paid Yu HK$19.5 million at her request between 2007 and 2011, and an additional HK$10 million in February 2012 in “appreciation for [her] friendship and support over the years”. In September 2012, Yu filed a lawsuit against Chow, asserting that there was an additional oral agreement purportedly reached around Christmas of 2002 for Chow to pay her a 10 per cent share of net profits on all successful investments she recommended. Yu’s claim for damages of some HK$80 million was based on her purported share of the profits from Chow’s investments in his current luxury home at 12 Pollock’s Path on The Peak, three houses at The Beverley Hills in Tai Po and a private equity fund. In 2021, a lower court ruled the pair never made that deal, a decision that was upheld on appeal.

Additionally, Chow has been noted for strained relations with former friends and colleagues, though he has rarely commented on them publicly. His high-profile feuds include those with Charles Heung and Tiffany Chen of China Star Entertainment, Wong Jing, and Sammo Hung. He has also faced complaints from Ng Man-tat, Tony Leung Chiu-wai, Lee Lik-chi, Danny Lee, Eva Huang, Law Kar-ying, and Johnnie To, mostly alleging that he was greedy, selfish, and autocratic.

== Politics ==
In 2013, Chow was elected a member of the 11th Guangdong Provincial Committee of the Chinese People's Political Consultative Conference (CPPCC). According to media exposure, Chow often arrives late and leaves early at the conference, and has not put forward any proposals.

== Filmography ==
=== Film ===
Acting roles

| Year | English title | Chinese title | Role | Notes |
|---|---|---|---|---|
| 1987 | Back To The Beyond | 陰陽界 | | |
| 1988 | Final Justice | 霹靂先鋒 | Boy | |
| 1988 | Faithfully Yours | 最佳女婿 | Puddin Lai | |
| 1988 | The Last Conflict | 刑警本色 | Lau Ting Kin | |
| 1988 | He Who Chases After the Wind | 捕風漢子 | Sing | |
| 1989 | Thunder Cops II | 贼公差婆 | Sui Yuen | |
| 1989 | Just Heroes | 義膽群英 | "Jacky" Yuen Kei-hao | |
| 1989 | Dragon Fight | 龍在天涯 | Yao | |
| 1990 | Love Is Love | 望夫成龍 | Shi Jinshui | |
| 1990 | My Hero | 一本漫畫闖天涯 | Sing | |
| 1990 | Lung Fung Restaurant | 龍鳳茶樓 | Rubbish Pool | |
| 1990 | Curry and Pepper | 咖喱辣椒 | Chiu Man-keung / "Pepper" | |
| 1990 | Sleazy Dizzy | 小偷阿星 | Sing | |
| 1990 | Look Out, Officer! | 師兄撞鬼 | Sing | |
| 1990 | All for the Winner | 賭聖 | Sing | |
| 1990 | When Fortune Smiles | 無敵幸運星 | Vincent Hing | |
| 1990 | Triad Story | 江湖最後一個大佬 | Sing | |
| 1990 | Legend of the Dragon | 龍的傳人 | Chow Siu-lung | |
| 1990 | The Unmatchable Match | 風雨同路 | Cheung Long | |
| 1991 | Crazy Safari | 非洲和尚 | Narrator | Voice |
| 1991 | God of Gamblers II | 賭俠 | Chow Sing-cho | |
| 1991 | The Top Bet | 賭霸 | Sing | Cameo |
| 1991 | Fist of Fury 1991 | 新精武門1991 | Lau Ching / Saint of Gamblers | |
| 1991 | Fight Back to School | 逃學威龍 | Star Chow / Chow Sing-Sing | |
| 1991 | God of Gamblers III: Back to Shanghai | 賭俠2之上海灘賭聖 | Chow Sing-cho | |
| 1991 | The Magnificent Scoundrels | 情聖 | Romeo / Ching Sing | |
| 1991 | The Banquet | 豪門夜宴 | Himself | Cameo |
| 1991 | Tricky Brains | 整蠱專家 | Jing Koo / Man-yuk | |
| 1992 | Fist of Fury 1991 II | 漫畫威龍 | Lau Ching | |
| 1992 | All's Well, Ends Well | 家有囍事 | Seung Foon | |
| 1992 | Fight Back to School II | 逃學威龍2 | Chow Sing-sing | |
| 1992 | Justice, My Foot! | 審死官 | Sung Sai Kit | |
| 1992 | Royal Tramp | 鹿鼎記 | Wai Siu-bo | |
| 1992 | Royal Tramp II | 鹿鼎記2神龍教 | Wai Siu-bo | |
| 1992 | King of Beggars | 武狀元蘇乞兒 | So Chan | |
| 1992 | The Thief of Time | 群星會 | Duen Siu-fei | |
| 1993 | Fight Back to School III | 逃學威龍3之龍過雞年 | Star Chow | |
| 1993 | Flirting Scholar | 唐伯虎點秋香 | Tong Pak-Fu | |
| 1993 | The Mad Monk | 濟公 | Ji Gong / Dragon-Fighter Lohan / Lee Xu Yuen | |
| 1994 | Love on Delivery | 破壞之王 | Ho Kam-ang | |
| 1994 | Hail the Judge | 九品芝麻官 | Judge Bao Sing / Pao Lung Sing | |
| 1994 | From Beijing with Love | 國產凌凌漆 | Ling-ling-chat | |
| 1995 | A Chinese Odyssey Part One: Pandora's Box | 西遊記第壹佰零壹回之月光寶盒 | Sun Wukong / Joker | |
| 1995 | A Chinese Odyssey Part Two: Cinderella | 西遊記大結局之仙履奇緣 | Sun Wukong / Joker | |
| 1995 | Out of the Dark | 回魂夜 | Leo | |
| 1995 | Sixty Million Dollar Man | 百變星君 | Lee Chak-Sing | |
| 1996 | Forbidden City Cop | 大內密探零零發 | Ling Ling-fat | |
| 1996 | The God of Cookery | 食神 | Stephen Chow | |
| 1997 | All's Well, Ends Well 1997 | 97家有囍事 | Lo Kung | |
| 1997 | Lawyer Lawyer | 算死草 | Chan Mong-Gut | |
| 1998 | The Lucky Guy | 行運一條龍 | Ho Kam Sui | |
| 1999 | Gorgeous | 玻璃樽 | Policeman | Cameo |
| 1999 | King of Comedy | 喜劇之王 | Wan Tin-sau | |
| 1999 | The Tricky Master | 千王之王2000 | Master Wong | |
| 2001 | Shaolin Soccer | 少林足球 | Sing / Mighty Steel Leg | |
| 2004 | Kung Fu Hustle | 功夫 | Sing | |
| 2008 | CJ7 | 長江七號 | Chow Ti | |

=== Filmmaking credits ===
Feature film

| Year | English title | Director | Writer | Producer | Notes | Ref. |
|---|---|---|---|---|---|---|
| 1994 | From Beijing with Love | Yes | Yes | No | Co-directed with Lee Lik-chi | |
| 1996 | Forbidden City Cop | Yes | Yes | No | Co-directed with Vincent Kok | |
| 1996 | The God of Cookery | Yes | Yes | No | Co-directed with Lee Lik-chi | |
| 1999 | King of Comedy | Yes | Yes | No | Co-directed with Lee Lik-chi | |
| 2001 | Shaolin Soccer | Yes | Yes | No | | |
| 2004 | Kung Fu Hustle | Yes | Yes | Yes | | |
| 2008 | CJ7 | Yes | Yes | Yes | | |
| 2008 | Shaolin Girl | No | No | Yes | | |
| 2009 | Jump | No | No | Yes | | |
| 2009 | Dragonball Evolution | No | No | Yes | | |
| 2010 | CJ7: The Cartoon | No | No | Yes | | |
| 2013 | Journey to the West: Conquering the Demons | Yes | Yes | Yes | Co-directed with Derek Kwok | |
| 2016 | The Mermaid | Yes | Yes | Yes | | |
| 2017 | Journey to the West: The Demons Strike Back | No | No | Yes | | |
| 2019 | The New King of Comedy | Yes | Yes | Yes | | |
| 2019 | Journey to the West: Conquering the Demons TV | No | No | Yes | | |
| 2019 | The Mermaid TV | No | No | Yes | | |
| 2026 | Kung Fu Soccer | Yes | Yes | Yes | | |

=== Television ===
| Year | English title | Chinese title | Ref. |
|---|---|---|---|
| 1983 | The Nuts | 黑白殭屍 | |
| 1983 | Crossroads – Pocket Money | 臨歧：零用錢 | |
| 1988 | Behind Silk Curtains | 大都會 | |
| 1988 | My Father's Son | 鬥氣一族 | |
| 1989 | The Final Combat | 蓋世豪俠 | |
| 1989 | The Justice of Life | 他來自江湖 | |
| 1990 | It Runs in the Family | 孖仔孖心肝 | |

== Awards and nominations ==
| Award | Year | Category | Nominated work | Result | Ref. |
|---|---|---|---|---|---|
| Amsterdam Fantastic Film Festival | 2005 | Silver Scream Award | Kung Fu Hustle | Won | |
| Asia Pacific Film Festival | 1992 | Best Actor | Justice, My Foot | Won | |
| BAFTA Awards | 2006 | Best Film not in the English Language | Kung Fu Hustle | Nominated | |
| Blue Ribbon Awards | 2002 | Best Foreign Language Film | Shaolin Soccer | Won | |
| Boston Society of Film Critics Awards | 2005 | Best Foreign Language Film | Kung Fu Hustle | Won | |
| Broadcast Film Critics Association Awards | 2005 | Best Foreign Language Film | Kung Fu Hustle | Won | |
| Dallas-Fort Worth Film Critics Association Awards | 2005 | Best Foreign Language Film | Kung Fu Hustle | Won | |
| Florida Film Critics Circle Awards | 2005 | Best Foreign Language Film | Kung Fu Hustle | Won | |
| Golden Bauhinia Awards | 1996 | Best Actor | A Chinese Odyssey | Won | |
| Golden Bauhinia Awards | 1996 | Best Director | Shaolin Soccer | Won | |
| Golden Globe Award | 2006 | Best Foreign Language Film | Kung Fu Hustle | Nominated | |
| Golden Horse Awards | 1998 | Best Supporting Actor | Final Justice | Won | |
| Golden Horse Awards | 2005 | Best Picture | Kung Fu Hustle | Won | |
| Golden Horse Awards | 2005 | Best Director | Kung Fu Hustle | Won | |
| Hong Kong Film Awards | 2002 | Best Picture | Shaolin Soccer | Won | |
| Hong Kong Film Awards | 2002 | Best Director | Shaolin Soccer | Won | |
| Hong Kong Film Awards | 2002 | Best Actor | Shaolin Soccer | Won | |
| Hong Kong Film Awards | 2002 | Best New Director | Shaolin Soccer | Won | |
| Hong Kong Film Awards | 2005 | Best Picture | Kung Fu Hustle | Won | |
| Hong Kong Film Critics Society Awards | 1996 | Best Actor | A Chinese Odyssey | Won | |
| Hong Kong Film Critics Society Awards | 1996 | Best Director | The Mermaid | Won | |
| Hong Kong Film Directors' Guild Awards | 2016 | Best Director | The Mermaid | Won | |
| Hundred Flowers Awards | 2006 | Outstanding Feature Film | Kung Fu Hustle | Won | |
| Las Vegas Film Critics Society Awards | 2005 | Best Foreign Language Film | Kung Fu Hustle | Won | |
| Phoenix Film Critics Society Awards | 2005 | Best Foreign Language Film | Kung Fu Hustle | Won | |
| Southeastern Film Critics Association Awards | 2005 | Best Foreign Language Film | Kung Fu Hustle | Won | |
| Utah Film Critics Association Awards | 2005 | Best Foreign Language Film | Kung Fu Hustle | Won | |

== See also ==
- Sing girls
- Cinema of China
- Cinema of Hong Kong
