= A Chinese Odyssey =

1995 Hong Kong film by Jeffrey Lau

- Hong Kong Blu-ray disc box set
- Directed by: Jeffrey Lau
- Screenplay by: Jeffrey Lau
- Based on: Journey to the West by Wu Cheng'en
- Produced by: Yeung Kwok-fai
- Starring: Stephen Chow; Athena Chu; Ng Man-tat; Yammie Lam; Karen Mok; Law Kar-ying; Jeffrey Lau; Lu Shuming; Ada Choi
- Cinematography: Poon Hang-sang; Ray Wong; William Yim
- Edited by: Hai Kit-wai
- Music by: Zhao Jiping; Lowell Lo
- Production companies: Xi'an Film Studio; Choi Sing Film Company
- Distributed by: San Bo; Mega Star; Media Asia
- Release dates: 21 January 1995 (Part 1); 4 February 1995 (Part 2)
- Running time: Part 1: 87 minutes Part 2: 95 minutes
- Country: Hong Kong
- Language: Cantonese
- Box office: Part 1: HK$25,093,380; Part 2: HK$20,872,117; CN¥189.202 million (mainland China)

A Chinese Odyssey Part One: Pandora's Box
- Traditional Chinese: 西遊記第壹佰零壹回之月光寶盒
- Simplified Chinese: 西游记第一百零一回之月光宝盒
Transcriptions
Standard Mandarin
- Hanyu Pinyin: Xīyóujì Dì Yībǎilíngyī Huí Zhī Yuèguāng Bǎohé
Yue: Cantonese
- Jyutping: Sai1-jau4-gei3 Dai6 Jat1-baak3-ling4-jat1 Wui4 Zi1 Jyut6-gwong1 Bou2-hap6

A Chinese Odyssey Part Two: Cinderella
- Traditional Chinese: 西遊記大結局之仙履奇緣
- Simplified Chinese: 西游记大结局之仙履奇缘
Transcriptions
Standard Mandarin
- Hanyu Pinyin: Xīyóujì Dà Jiéjú Zhī Xiānlǚ Qíyuán
Yue: Cantonese
- Jyutping: Sai1-jau4-gei3 Dai6 Git3-guk6 Zi1 Sin1-leoi5 Kei4-jyun4

A Chinese Odyssey is Chinese film series directed by Jeffrey Lau. It is a spin-off of the 16th-century novel Journey to the West, following the adventures of Sun Wukong when he gets sidetracked while escorting Tang Sanzang on their quest for the Buddhist scriptures. The original series consisted of two back-to-back films released in 1995: A Chinese Odyssey Part One: Pandora's Box (西遊記第壹佰零壹回之月光寶盒) and A Chinese Odyssey Part Two: Cinderella (西遊記大結局之仙履奇緣), starring Stephen Chow, Athena Chu, Ng Man-tat, Yammie Lam, Karen Mok, Law Kar-ying, Lu Shuming and Ada Choi. A third film, A Chinese Odyssey Part Three, with a largely different cast and less popularity, was released on 14 September 2016.

The two-part A Chinese Odyssey, the first project produced by the Choi Sing Film Company co-founded by Chow, met with a lukewarm critical and commercial reception upon its premiere in 1995. By the 2000s, however, it had developed a cult following among young people in mainland China and helped establish Chow as a cultural icon.

== Synopsis ==
=== Part One ===
500 years ago, Monkey got annoyed with Longevity Monk while escorting him on his quest to fetch the Buddhist scriptures, and betrayed him. He was subdued by Guanyin, who gave him a second chance after Longevity Monk pleaded for leniency and sacrificed himself.

In the present, Monkey has been reincarnated as Joker, an outlaw chief, and has no memory of his past life. He and his gang are attacked by two demonesses, Spider Woman and Bai Jingjing. Joker's second-in-command, who is actually Pigsy reincarnated, overhears the demonesses' plan to capture and eat Longevity Monk, and gets forced into servitude by Spider Woman. Joker later falls in love with Bai Jingjing. Grandpa Buddha shows up to warn Joker about danger and gives him a magic mirror that can reveal a being's true form.

The group is attacked by Bull King; Joker and Pigsy flee with Bai Jingjing and Spider Woman to a cave, where the demonesses start fighting over Joker. Bai Jingjing and Joker escape, while Spider Woman is accidentally impregnated with Pigsy's child. As Bai Jingjing has been poisoned, Joker goes back to ask for the antidote and gets imprisoned by Spider Woman. Meanwhile, Bai Jingjing is captured by Bull King, who heals her in exchange for her helping him take revenge against Monkey.

In the cave, Joker finds Pandora's Box, which can open a time portal under moonlight when "Prajñāpāramitā" is chanted. He also overhears Guanyin's voice, telling him about his destiny to accompany Longevity Monk to complete his quest. Meanwhile, Bull King and Bai Jingjing enter the cave and fight with Spider Woman. Bai Jingjing commits suicide after mistakenly believing that Joker has betrayed her and now has a child with Spider Woman.

Joker uses the Pandora's box to travel back in time to stop Bai Jingjing from committing suicide. He fails on the first three attempts. The fourth time, he ends up going back to 500 years ago, where he encounters the fairy Zixia, who confiscates the box and sears three dots on the sole of his foot to mark him as her servant, revealing Joker as Monkey.

=== Part Two ===
Joker learns more about his past life and reunites with Longevity Monk, Pigsy and Sandy. However, he only wants to get back the Pandora's box and return to 500 years later to save Bai Jingjing. Zixia falls in love with him after he unsheathes her sword as she has promised to marry whoever manages to do that.

When Zixia and Longevity Monk are captured by Bull King, Joker and his companions fight to save her but Joker falls off a cliff. Joker was rescued and directed his rescuers to the same cave. He is killed by Spider Woman, and only realises moments before his death that his true love is Zixia. As a ghost, he hears Guanyin's voice reminding him about his destiny. Finally deciding to accept his fate, he puts on the golden headband, transforms into Monkey, and returns to fight Bull King. Now that he has reclaimed his true identity, he must relinquish all worldly desires, including love, so he cannot be together with Zixia anymore. Monkey fights Bull King and in an attempt to save everyone, he is attacked by Bull King. Zixia sacrifices herself to save him. As she dies, Monkey confesses his love for her and the headband tightens, giving him an extreme headache. He beats up Bull King before using the Pandora's Box to escape with his master and two juniors.

Monkey awakes and sees the incarnations of Joker and Zixia in a standoff on a city wall. He uses his powers to possess Joker and give Zixia a long and passionate kiss before walking away. The embracing couple continue their romantic relationship, while Monkey races off to join his companions on their journey to the west.

== Cast ==
- Stephen Chow as Sun Wukong / Joker
- Law Kar-ying as Longevity Monk
- Ng Man-tat as Zhu Bajie / Joker's second-in-command
- Johnnie Kong as Sha Wujing / Blindy
- Athena Chu as Zixia
- Yammie Lam as Spider Woman
- Karen Mok as Bai Jingjing
- Jeffrey Lau as Grandpa Buddha / The Grapes
- Lu Shuming as Bull King
- Ada Choi as Princess Iron Fan

== Production ==
In 1994, Chow established his own film production company, Choi Sing Company (variously translated as Caixing Film Company and Hong Kong Color Star Film Company), and approached Jeffrey Lau about writing and directing his next movie. Lau told Chow that if he kept making the same movie over and over again he would never find popularity with female audiences and he needed to play a romantic lead. In a hotel meeting, he pitched Chow on filming a two-part adaptation of the classic Chinese novel, Journey to the West, and Chow agreed. In order to shoot on China's locations, the movie became a China-Hong Kong co-production between Chow's Choi Sing Company and Xi'an Film Studios. The remote Xi'an Studios had always encouraged innovation and become home to China's celebrated wave of Fifth Generation arthouse directors like Zhang Yimou and Chen Kaige and they were reluctant to work with a commercial Hong Kong production. However, cuts in government subsidies forced them to look for new sources of financing and they embraced the co-production model.

The resulting shoot was chaotic, with the Hong Kong crew speaking only Cantonese and the Chinese crew speaking Mandarin. Actors like Lu Shuming and Wu Yujin said they had very little idea of what was going on and actor Law Kar-ying described Chow as "arrogant".

== Release ==
The two films were titled A Chinese Odyssey Part One - Pandora's Box and A Chinese Odyssey Part Two - Cinderella and released in January and February 1995.

== Reception ==
=== Box office ===
The first part grossed HK$25,093,380 and the second HK$20,872,117 in Hong Kong. The second part has grossed CN¥189.202 million on its 2017 release in mainland China.

Both films underperformed at the box office, leading to Choi Sing Film Company declaring bankruptcy. Chow, however, earned substantial money from the movie over the years through licensing and advertising opportunities.

=== Critical reception ===
The Austin Chronicle gave Part Two a positive review saying that "if you missed the original film — forget it, you'll never understand what's happening in this picture, but if you saw and enjoyed the first part, you'll no doubt have a great time with this terrific follow-up".

The line "10,000 years" in the film became one of the most popular buzzwords for Chinese-language films, with a Google search count of 21.9 million. In the late '90s and early 2000s, the films became a cult favorite in China with phrases, expressions, and memes from the two films becoming a foundational part of early Chinese internet culture. This also became known in part as the Stephen Chow Phenomenon (周星驰现象).

=== Accolades ===
Ceremony	Year	Category	Recipient	Result	Ref.
2nd Hong Kong Film Critics Society Award	1995	Best Screenplay	Jeffrey Lau	Won	
2nd Hong Kong Film Critics Society Award	1995	Best Actor	Stephen Chow	Won	
2nd Hong Kong Film Critics Society Award	1995	Film of Merit	A Chinese Odyssey	Won	
15th Hong Kong Film Awards	1996	Best Screenplay	Jeffrey Lau (Part 1)	Nominated	
15th Hong Kong Film Awards	1996	Best Screenplay	Jeffrey Lau (Part 2)	Nominated	
15th Hong Kong Film Awards	1996	Best Actor	Stephen Chow (Part 2)	Nominated	
1st Golden Bauhinia Awards	1996	Best Film	A Chinese Odyssey Part Two: Cinderella	Nominated	
1st Golden Bauhinia Awards	1996	Best Actor	Stephen Chow (Part 2)	Won	
24th Hong Kong Film Awards	2005	Best 100 Chinese Motion Pictures	A Chinese Odyssey (#19)	Won	

== See also ==
- Other films directed by Jeffrey Lau based on Journey to the West:
  - A Chinese Tall Story
  - Just Another Pandora's Box
  - A Chinese Odyssey Part Three
- List of media adaptations of Journey to the West
- Journey to the West: Conquering the Demons, a 2013 action comedy film loosely based on Journey to the West, directed by Stephen Chow.
