= Fight Back to School II =

1992 Hong Kong film by Gordon Chan

- DVD cover
- Directed by: Gordon Chan
- Written by: Gordon Chan; Chan Kin-chung
- Produced by: Jimmy Heung
- Starring: Stephen Chow; Cheung Man; Ng Man-tat; Athena Chu; Deanie Yip
- Cinematography: Cheng Siu-Keung
- Edited by: Marco Mak
- Distributed by: Win's Entertainment, Ltd. Gala Film Distribution Limited
- Release date: April 9, 1992
- Running time: 106 minutes
- Country: Hong Kong
- Languages: Cantonese; Mandarin

Fight Back to School 2 (Chinese: 逃學威龍2) is a 1992 Hong Kong action comedy film directed by Gordon Chan and co-written by Chan Kin-chung, and produced by Jimmy Heung. The film stars Stephen Chow, Ng Man-Tat and Cheung Man. It is a sequel to the 1991 film Fight Back to School.

As per the original Fight Back to School, this film is set in 2 schools in Hong Kong: Shatin College and Chinese International School.

== Plot ==
Star Chow is an officer in the Royal Hong Kong Police's elite Special Duties Unit (SDU). During a meeting with his senior officer, Superintendent of Police, Madam Yip, Star jokingly suggests he wish to be reassigned to the traffic unit.

Star immediately finds himself demoted to Constable engaging in traffic duty on the streets of Hong Kong. After being made the scapegoat for a failed high school terrorist investigation, Star hastily resigns from the police.

He decides to enroll at the high school to launch his own private investigation. However, Star realises the investigation will not be easy when he discovers that the bumbling, incompetent CID detective Tat is also undercover at the high school.

== Cast and roles ==
- Stephen Chow as Chow Sing-sing, undercover student
- Cheung Man as Miss Ho
- Ng Man-tat as Uncle Tat, undercover and Discipline teacher
- Athena Chu as Sandy Lai, student
- Deanie Ip as Superintendent of Police, Madam Yip
- Michael Chow as Special Branch officer and Undercover student
- Cheung Chi-Kwong as Maths teacher
- Michael Dingo as Peter
- Mark Houghton as Terrorist
- Jonathan Isgar as Terrorist
- Mark King as Terrorist
- Blackie Ko as Belligerent hood
- Spencer Lam as Judo Teacher
- Gabriel Wong
- Sarah Lee
- Indra Leech
- Tam Sin-hung
- John Wakefield
- Wong Jim as Minister Wong
- Sen Wong

== Alternative versions ==
The Taiwanese DVD release from Scholar contains 17 minutes of extended footage:

- An 11-minute flashback of the first film in Mandarin without any English subtitles.
- Stephen Chow pushing the bus.
- Extended scene of Stephen Chow and the principal of the school sit down on a chair.
- The sequence where Stephen is on a cross of Jesus Christ had been removed from the Taiwanese version for the sake of pacing.
- Extended extra scene of Chow coming towards Sandy in the sports area then her sister drags her to play tennis.
- Chow and Sharla Cheung look for a new apartment. Chow senses something suspicious between his girlfriend and Sharla also senses that Chow is hiding something away from her which explains why in the end of the movie Sharla Cheung gets the maths teacher for a boyfriend.
- An extended scene of Sandy and her sister talk about chow in the cafeteria scene.
- The scene of Stephen forced to go home by his fake mother who is a cop. There is an alternate shorter scene when Stephen gets expelled by Ng Man Tat and an extended scene of him walking down the stairs.
- The battle sequence at the school is shorter in the Taiwanese version.
- The montage at the end of the film is more than five minutes long and has a different music soundtrack.

The original director's cut contains a scene where during the sequence where Chow punches right through a basketball right before Ng Man Tat is shown holding a yellow ruler and playing with it and an extended scene during the roll call scene with Stephen Chow and his classmate admiring him this part can be shown at the extended montage at the end of the film.
