= Kung Fu Soccer =

Kung Fu Soccer may refer to:

- Kung Fu Soccer (TV series), a 2004 Hong Kong television series
- Kung Fu Soccer (film), a 2026 film
- Shaolin Soccer, a 2001 film
