= Journey to the West (1996 TV series) =

Hong Kong fantasy television series

- VCD cover art

Chinese name
- Traditional Chinese: 西遊記
- Simplified Chinese: 西游记
Transcriptions
Standard Mandarin
- Hanyu Pinyin: Xī Yóu Jì
Yue: Cantonese
- Jyutping: Sai1 Jau4 Gei3
- Genre: Chinese mythology, shenmo fantasy, adventure
- Based on: Journey to the West by Wu Cheng'en
- Screenplay by: Yip Kwong-yam; Chung Ching; Chung Yeuk-si; Ding Sam; So Chi-wai; Leung Siu-yan
- Directed by: Lo Lun-seung; Wong Kin-fan; Lee Kim-wo; Lee Man-lung; Chan Seung-kuen; Lau Kwok-fai
- Starring: Dicky Cheung; Kwong Wah; Wayne Lai; Evergreen Mak
- Narrated by: Jimmy Kwok
- Theme music composer: Ng Tung-ming; Chu Ging-yin; Kwan Bo-syun
- Opening theme: Sai Yau Kei (西遊記) performed by Dicky Cheung
- Ending theme: Tin Ngoi Yau Tin (天外有天) performed by Dicky Cheung
- Country of origin: Hong Kong
- Original language: Cantonese
- No. of episodes: 30

Production
- Producer: Lau Sze-yu
- Production location: Hong Kong
- Editors: Cheung Wah-biu; Yip Kwong-yam
- Running time: 45 minutes per episode
- Production company: TVB

Original release
- Network: TVB Jade

Related
- Journey to the West II (1998)

Journey to the West is a Hong Kong television series adapted from the 16th-century novel of the same title. Starring Dicky Cheung, Kwong Wah, Wayne Lai and Evergreen Mak, the series was produced by TVB and was first broadcast on TVB Jade in Hong Kong in November 1996. A sequel, Journey to the West II, was broadcast in 1998, but the role of the Monkey King was played by Benny Chan instead, due to contract problems between Dicky Cheung and TVB. Cheung later reprised the role in another television series The Monkey King: Quest for the Sutra (2002), which was broadcast on TVB but not produced by the station.

== Cast ==
=== Main cast ===
- Dicky Cheung as Sun Wukong
- Kwong Wa as Tang Sanzang
- Wayne Lai as Zhu Bajie
- Evergreen Mak as Sha Wujing
- Tong Chun-ming as White Dragon Horse

=== Other cast ===
Note: Some cast members played multiple roles.

- Lee Lung-kei as Jade Emperor
- Angelina Lo as Queen Mother of the West
- Wah Chung-nam as Taishang Laojun
- Cheung Ying-choi as Taibai Jinxing
- Joe Ma as Erlang Shen
- Lee Wong-sang as Li Jing
- He Meitian as Nezha
- Chun Hung as Juling Shen
- Kwok Tak-shun as Old Man under the Moon
- Wong Man-biu as Barefoot Immortal
- Yau Biu as Duke of Thunder
- Marco Lo as Thousand Li Eye, Cowherd
- Luk Yuen-fan, Ng Lit-wah, Lulu Kai, Chan Chor-kiu, Wong Je-yi, Lee Bo-hin and Wong Chun-kam as Seven Fairies
- Ben Wong as Earth Deity
  - Wu Yiu-fung as young Earth Deity
- Chor Yuen as Buddha
- Mimi Kung Chi Yan as Guanyin
- Ng Wai-san as Longnü
- Siu Cheuk-yiu, Doi Siu-man, Chu Lok-fai, Luk Hei-yeung as Four Heavenly Kings
- Chan Wing-chun as Lü Dongbin
- Mak Ka-lun as Lan Caihe
- Koo Ming-wah as Zhongli Quan
- Wong Wai-lam as Iron Crutch Li
- Leung Kin-ping as Royal Uncle Cao
- Lee Hoi-sang as Elder Zhang Guo
- Wong Wai-tak as Han Xiangzi
- Wong Fung-king as He Xiangu
- Chan Kwok-kuen as Ksitigarbha
- Cheng Ka-sang as King Yama
- Tang Yu-chiu as Hell Judge
- Chan Fung-bing as Meng Po
- Wong Wai as Subhuti
- Rebecca Chan as Princess Iron Fan
  - Lee Si-yan as young Princess Iron Fan
- Gordon Liu as Bull Demon King
  - Cheng Chung-hin as young Bull Demon King
- Lo Tze-lok as young Kitchen God
- Fong Kit as Night Patrol Deity, Village chief
  - Chan Chung-tak as young Night Patrol Deity
- Lee Ying as Chang'e
- Lee Yiu-ging as Houyi
- Derek Kok as Wu Gang
- Wong Chun-ning as Marshal Tianpeng's deputy
- Cheung Hon-ban, Ng Man-sang as Monkeys
- Kiu Hung as Magician performer
- Tung Ngan as Little Demon
- Chung Wai-yi as Little Aunt
- Tam Yat-ching as Dragon King of the East Sea
- Cheung Hak as Third Dragon Prince
- Chan Min-leung as Turtle Immortal
- Cheng Pak-lun as Emperor Taizong of Tang
- Ho Pik-kin as Abbot
- Joseph Lee as Dragon King of Jing River
- Shek Wun as Turtle Chancellor
- Leo Tsang as Wei Zheng
- Cheung Jit, Zuki Lee, Wong Chun-kam as Devil Girls
- Ho Cheung-kwan, Eric Li, Wun Man-ying as Hell Guards
- Chan Hiu-wun as Ching-ching
- Ling Hon as Squire Gao
- Lily Liew as Mrs Gao, Queen of Xinglin
- Suen Kwai-hing, Lai Sau-ying as Gao family villagers
- Chan Chung-kin as Dragon King of the West Sea, Tie Yushu's father, King of Xinglin
- Maple Hui as Red Boy
- Michelle Fung as Jade Faced Vixen, Princess consort of Xinglin
- Akina Hong as Silver Fox
- Leung Suet-mei as Little Fox
- Kwan Ching as Dream Demon
- Damon Law, Lau Wing-chun as Dream Demon's minions
- Wang Kai-tak, Dai Yiu-ming as Red Boy's minions
- Lui Ying-yi as Chuntao
- Angela Tong as Weaver Girl
- Au Ngok as Village chief
- Chung Kit-yi as Ugly Girl, Spider Demon (Cuicui)
- Tang Yuk-wing as Yawang
- Lee Chi-wai, Leung Chiu-ho as Villagers
- Mariane Chan as White Bone Demon
- Edward Mok as Crown Prince Qianye
- Cheung Yuen-mei as Baihuaxiu
- Lo Kwok-wai as King of Baoxiang
- Wong Kin-fung as Guard commander
- Suen Yan-ming as Guard, Priest Chen
- Wun Seung-yin as Lady Mo
- Chan Po-ling as Zhenzhen, Spider Demon (Jingjing)
- Ho Mei-yu as Chuchu
- Lulu Kai as Lianlian
- Chan Yin-hong as Bai Susu
- Fung Sui-jan as Aunt Bai
- Lui Kim-kwong as Uncle Bai
- Lo Cheuk-nam as Prince of Loulan, Priest Li
- Andy Tai as Immortal of Tiger Power
- Lee Wai-man as Immortal of Elk Power
- Daniel Kwok as Immortal of Antelope Power
- Lau Kong as King of Chechi
- Lee Hung-kit as Abbot of Zhiyuan Monastery
- Chin Kar-lok as Centipede Demon / Song Yushu / Tie Yushu
- Angie Cheung as Spider Demon (Shishi)
- Law Lan as Spider Demon (Shishi and En'en's mother)
- Rain Lau as Spider Demon (En'en)
- Tang Lai-man as Spider Demon (Meimei)
- Tang Siu-chun as Rooster Demon
- Siu Yuk-yin as Flower Demon
- Suen Kwai-hing as Song Yushu and Shishi's teacher
- Wong Siu-lung as Song Yushu's classmate
- Cheng Lui as Travelling monk
- Lau Gwai-fong as Song Yushu's mother
- Lisa Lui as Ruler of Women's Kingdom
- Chan Pui-san as Princess of Women's Kingdom
- Kara Hui as Flying Tiger General
- Cheung Jit as Flying Bear General
- Chan Heung-ying as Flying Eagle General
- Tsang Wai-wun as Women's Kingdom official
- Joyce Chan as Bull Girl / Mingyue
- Yu Mo-lin as Imperial physician
- Ng Man-tat as Street Magician
