= In the Realm of Fancy =

- Promo poster
- 繾綣仙凡間
- Genre: Ancient, Fantasy, Romance
- Starring: Kwong Wah; Shirley Yeung; Louis Fan; Marco Ngai; Mark Kwok; Winnie Young; Ruby Wong; Suet Nei; Chan Hung Lit
- Opening theme: "未悔用情 Love without Regret" by Kwong Wa
- Country of origin: Hong Kong
- Original language: Cantonese
- No. of episodes: 20

Production
- Producer: Tsui Ching Hong Stephen 徐正康
- Running time: 45 minutes (approx.)

Original release
- Network: TVB
- Release: May 5 – May 30, 2003

In the realm of Fancy is a 2003 TVB fantasy costume drama, set in the Tang dynasty, it was produced by Tsui Ching Hong. Consisting of 20 episodes it was first aired from May 5, 2003 to May 30, 2003 in the peak 8:00 to 9:00 pm weekday slot, and was repeated in 2005 in the late afternoon (18.00-18.30) slot and again in 2009 in the late night (22.00-2300) slot.

== Synopsis ==
Lei Xuan (Kwong Wah) is the prefect of Tiānpíng Prefecture in Tang dynasty China. In the course of his duties he confronts a group of what he believes to be religious charlatans who claim to be in possession of divinely inspired magical powers and who demand money to placate their deity. Despite his sceptism Lei Xuan pretends to have powers of his own to combat the fraudsters, who seem to have genuine powers. After a battle of wits Lei Xuan exposes the fraudsters for what they are and that the majority of their so-called magical powers are tricks, however even when exposed the fraudsters continue to claim that some of their powers are real and derive from a magical treatise.

With the treatise in his possession Lei Xuan uses the populaces belief in magic to solve crimes in his jurisdiction by pretending to consult and use the manual. Even when magical formulations from the manual appear to work Lei Xuan puts the results down to co-incidence and the gullibility of the uneducated. However, when Lei Xuan is targeted by a witch who uses her powers to steal the life essence of men to maintain an illusion of eternal youth he cannot but admit that magic is real, and with the aid of the manual defeats the witch and saves his own life.

Lei Xuan is aided in his adventures by his man servant Ching Ao Gum and his betrothed Bei Chur Wun (Shirley Yeung). Chur Wun is the daughter of the Tang chancellor and Lei Xuan's betrothed, despite her devotion to him Lei Xuan doubts his own love for her and in a moment of confusion asks the manual to show him what true love is. The manual taking Lei Xuan at his word leads Lei Xuan's astral body on a journey in which he encounters lovers of various times and eras, including the past and future. Early in his voyage Lei Xuan becomes frustrated by lovers who out of misunderstandings or circumstances appear to be drifting apart and uses the manual to smooth their paths, with each subsequent pair that he is shown Lei Xuan's powers increase as is his desire to aid those in love, so that those who truly love one another can be together.

The last couple that the manual shows Lei Xuan is Chur Wun and his man servant Ching Ao Gum (Louis Fan). Although in his astral form no time seems to have passed in the real world seven years have passed, Lei Xuan material body empty of a soul for seven years has been kept from decay by the efforts of Chur Wun and Ching Ao Gum who use ice from a mountain to preserve the body. Lei Xuan realises that the love he is being shown is that between Chur Wun and Ao Gum, who have grown to love each other, and not between Chur Wun and his own lifeless body. Wishing to free Chur Wun from their betrothal Lei Xuan accidentally destroys his material body in a fire, however Ao Gum because of his own lowly status refuses to acknowledge his love for Chur Wun. Finding himself powerless with the breaking of his ties to the material world, Lei Xuan's astral body occupies the body of a recently deceased beggar.

Using his knowledge of the couple and not magic Lei Xuan convinces Ao Gum to express his love for Chur Wun, and to compete in a competition to find a champion to lead the Tang vanguard. Through his supernatural strength, skill with an axe and an unwillingness to give up, Ao Gum wins and is accepted by the chancellor as a suitable match for Chur Wun (it is hinted that Ao Gum will become the famed Tang general of the same name, known in folklore as the Tang dynasty's lucky general who would always arrive in the right place at the right time to save the day).

With Ao Gum united with Chur Wun, Lei Xuan proceeds to abandon the material realm for that of the immortals, during his ascent and farewell to Ao Gum it is revealed that the beggar is Lei Xuan and that Lei Xuan is Tieguai Li, Iron-Crutch Li of the Eight Immortals.

== Cast ==
Note:the romanisation of the characters' names uses a Cantonese romanisation.

Cast	Role	Description
Kwong Wah	Lei Xuan 李玄	
Shirley Yeung	Bei Chur Wun 裴翠雲	
Louis Fan	Ching Ao Gum 程咬金	
Marco Ngai	Yeung Chung 楊宗	
Mark Kwok	Yu Yurk Tung 庾若冬	
Winnie Young	Chun Yee Shuet 秦凝雪	
Ruby Wong	Lau Yu Sin 柳如仙	
Suet Nei	Ching Dai Leung 程大娘	
Chan Hung Lit	Bei Shum Yuen 裴沈元	
