= Kwong Wa =

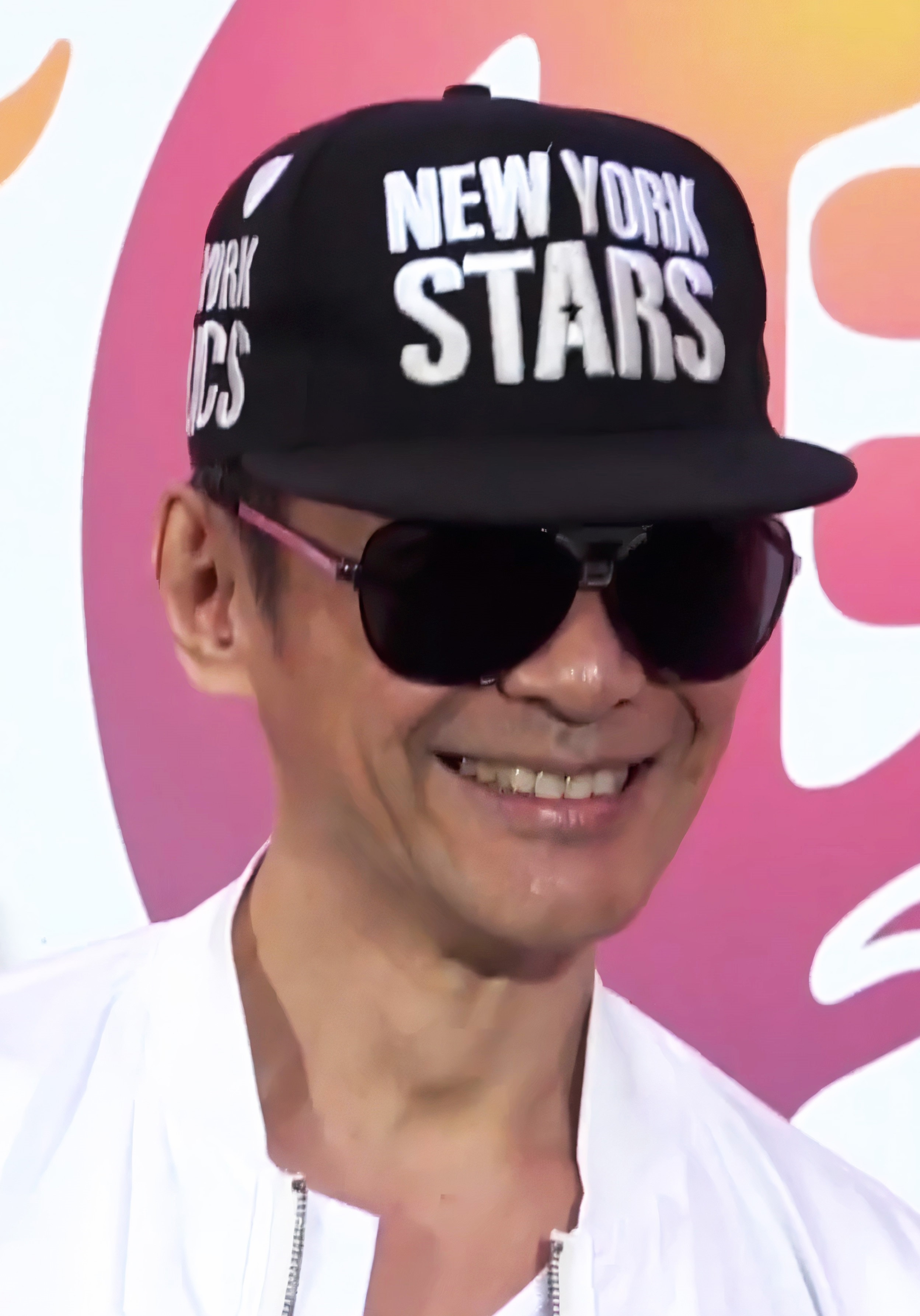
- Kwong in 2019
- Born: Chan Muk-wah (陳木華); 19 November 1961 (age 64); British Hong Kong
- Occupation: Actor
- Years active: 1986–2009
- Spouse: Kitman Mak (m. 1992)
- Children: 2
- Awards: Hong Kong Film Awards – Best New Performer; 1990 Life Goes On TVB Anniversary Awards – My Favourite Television Character; 2003 The King of Yesterday and Tomorrow

Chinese name
- Traditional Chinese: 江華
- Simplified Chinese: 江华
Transcriptions
Standard Mandarin
- Hanyu Pinyin: Jiāng Huá
Yue: Cantonese
- Jyutping: Gong1 Waa4
- Musical career
- Also known as: Kwong Wah; Kong Wah; Kong Wa
- Origin: Shantou, Guangdong, China
- Labels: ATV (1986–1995); TVB (1996–2004)

Kwong Wa (born Chan Muk-wah on 19 November 1961) (Note: 據《華僑日報》引述《新亞社》提供的法庭新聞、 於1987年5月9日刊登的報導「電視藝員陳木華 涉嫌毆人押候訊」，「被告陳木華，廿五歲 ……」一句顯示江華當時被捕那刻的年紀是25歲，而文章刊登日期為5月9日，並非11月19日之後，即代表江華作案時仍未過生日。故此在同年11月19日過後，江華應為26歲，1961年才是其正確的出生年份。) is a Hong Kong actor and singer. He is known for his portrayals of Chinese historical characters such as Lao Ai (A Step into the Past), Xiang Yu (The Conqueror's Story), Tang Sanzang (Journey to the West), Emperor Xuanzong of Tang (The Legend of Lady Yang), Yongzheng Emperor (The King of Yesterday and Tomorrow), and Qianlong Emperor (Happy Ever After).

== Career ==
Chan had his acting debut in the 1989 film Life Goes On as a cancer patient, which won him the Best New Actor Award in the 9th Hong Kong Film Awards. He then gained wider fame as Tang Sanzang in the television series Journey to the West (1996) and its sequel Journey to the West II (1998). After appearing in other dramas such as The Legend of Lady Yang (1999), Crimson Sabre (2001), and A Step into the Past (2001), Chan reached the peak of his fame as the Yongzheng Emperor in 2003's The King of Yesterday and Tomorrow. The show gained extremely high ratings and Chan was acclaimed for his charismatic performance as the emperor who travelled through time to 21st century Hong Kong. Afterwards, he has appeared in The Conqueror's Story (2004).

== Personal life ==
During a 2018 interview, Chan stated that he had suffered an accident that rendered him with a temporarily paralysed foot. Not knowing whether or not he would recover, let alone ever walk, he found consolation through Christianity and, during this time, made his conversion.

== Filmography ==
=== Film ===
Year	Title	Role	Notes
1989	Life Goes On 但願人長久		Hong Kong Film Award for Best New Performer
1991	The Real Me 喋血邊緣		
1991	Running On Empty 正紅旗下		
1992	Sisters in Law 積奇瑪莉		
1993	Lamb Killer 富貴狂花	Michael	
1994	To Live and Die in Tsimshatsui 新邊緣人		
1996	I'm Your Birthday Cake 不道德的禮物 / 桃色禮物	Lam Lok-shan	
2003	Left Alone 歷劫驚濤	Mike	
2007	Love Is... 真的戀愛了?		

=== Television ===
Year	Title	Role	Notes
1986	Heroes of Shaolin 少林英雄		
1986	時光倒流70年		
1988	幽靈		
1988	烈士忠魂		
1990	Housekeeper, My Honey 烈士忠魂		
1991	第三間電台		
1991	Rebuilding Prosperity 再造繁榮		
1991	Return to the Truth 還我今生 / 本是同根	Ko Sai-hong	
1991	The Good Fella from Temple Street 廟街豪情	Sheung Tin-chee	
1992	Spirit of the Dragon 李小龍傳 / 龍在江湖	Ko Tin-pang	
1992	The Shen Saga 新朱門怨	Third Young Master	
1993	The Silver Tycoon 銀狐	Sung Chak-yuen	
1993	Who's the Winner III 勝者為王III王者之戰	Fong Tsun	
1993	Gamblers' Dream 賭神秘笈'93 / 賭神秘笈之賭魔	Chin Tin-long	
1994	The Movie Tycoon 戲王之王	Po Tsun	
1994	A Cruel Lover 郎心如鐵 / 失落真心	Shum Man-ho	
1994	Secret Battle of the Majesty 九王奪位 / 君臨天下	Imperial Prince Yan-tsan / Yongzheng Emperor	
1995	I Have a Date with Spring 我和春天有個約會	Shum Ka-ho	
1995	棘手神探俏嬌娃 / 女幹探		
1996	Journey to the West 西遊記	Tong Sam-chong / Golden Cicada	
1997	Lady Flower Fist 苗翠花	Fong Tak	
1998	Journey to the West II 西遊記（貳）	Tong Sam-chong / Golden Cicada	
1999	Feminine Masculinity / Mr. Diana 先生貴性	Andrew Cheung Ho-wa	
1999	Happy Ever After 金玉滿堂	Qianlong Emperor	
2000	Ups and Downs 無業樓民	Ling Hei-sz	
2000	The Legend of Lady Yang 楊貴妃	Emperor Xuanzong of Tang	
2000	Crimson Sabre 碧血劍	Ha Suet-yee / Golden Snake	
2001	Seven Sisters 七姊妹	Mau Lin-sin	
2001	The Stamp of Love 肥婆奶奶扭計媳	Hanson Sung Hon-man	
2001	A Step into the Past 尋秦記	Lin Chun / Lo Oi	
2002	In the Realm of Fancy 繾綣仙凡間	Lee Yuen / Iron-Crutch Lee	
2003	The King of Yesterday and Tomorrow 九五至尊	Yongzheng Emperor / Lee Dai-ha	TVB Anniversary Award for My Favourite Television Character (Top 12); Nominated — TVB Anniversary Award for Best Actor (Top 5)
2003	Riches and Stitches 鳳舞香羅	Wing Ho-tung	
2004	The Conqueror's Story 楚漢驕雄	Hung Yu	
2004	新聊齋之畫皮	Wang Anxu	
2006	Romance of Red Dust 風塵三俠之紅拂女	Dugu Cheng	
2009	Life in Sanyuan County 跟紅頂白大三元	Man Pok-yan	
2010	Criminal Investigation 證義搜查線	Inspector Chan Kwok-king	

== Awards ==
- Hong Kong Film Awards – Best New Performer
  1990 Life Goes On
- TVB Anniversary Awards – My Favourite Television Character
  2003 The King of Yesterday and Tomorrow
