= Andy Kwong =

Hong Kong cinematographer

- Traditional Chinese: 鄺庭和
- Simplified Chinese: 邝庭和
Transcriptions
Standard Mandarin
- Hanyu Pinyin: Kuàng Tìnghé
Yue: Cantonese
- Jyutping: Kwong^{3} Ting^{4}-wo^{4}

Andy Kwong, also known as Ting Wo Kwong, is a Hong Kong cinematographer. He was nominated for the 2002 Hong Kong Film Award for Best Cinematography for his work in Shaolin Soccer (2001). He has been active in the cinema industry since 1979, and directed several commercials beginning in 2004. He is also a board member of the Hong Kong Society of Cinematographers and a judge for the Hong Kong Film Awards.

== Filmography ==
=== As lighting director ===
Name	Starring	Year
Little Cop (小小小警察)	Eric Tsang, Andy Lau, Alfred Cheung	1989
Tristar (大三元)	Leslie Cheung, Anita Yuen, Lau Ching-Wan	1996
The Dragon from Russia (紅牆飛龍)	Samuel Hui, Maggie Cheung, Nina Li Chi,	1990
Dance with Dragons (與龍共舞)	Andy Lau, Cheung Man	1991
Au Revoir, Mon Amour (何日君再來)	Anita Mui, Tony Leung Ka-Fai	1991
Royal Tramp (鹿鼎記)	Stephen Chow, Cheung Man, Ng Man Tat	1992
Handsome Siblings (絕代雙驕)	Brigitte Lin, Andy Lau	1992
Days of Tomorrow (天長地久)	Andy Lau	1993
Love and the City (都市情緣)	Leon Lai, Jacqueline Wu, Ng Man Tat	1994
The Returning (等著你回來)	Tony Leung Chiu Wai, Jacqueline Wu	1994
The Age of Miracles (麻麻煩煩)	Alan Tam, Anita Yuen	1995
Big Bullet (衝鋒隊之怨火街頭)	Lau Ching-Wan, Francis Ng, Jordan Chan	1996
God of Gamblers 3: The Early Stage (賭神三之少年賭神)	Leon Lai, Anita Yuen, Jordan Chan	1997

=== As director of cinematography ===
Television

Name	Year	Starring
Dragon Hall (龍堂)	1998	Jordan Chan, Chang Fengyi, Carrie Ng
Legend... (美麗的傳說)	2000	Simon Yam, Loletta Lee, Kristal Tin, Monica Chan, Kenneth Tsang
The World Is Not Enough (縱橫天下)	2001	Micheal Tao, Patrick Tam Yiu Man, Damian Lau, Kenneth Tsang, Kathy Chow Hoi-Mei
親情回歸 (Television movie)	2002	Loletta Lee, 蓋克, 黃一飛
回家看看 (Mainland television movie)	2005	
新不了情	2006	薛海琪, 陳坤, 方中信, 陳小藝, 余安安, 許少雄, 爾冬昇

Music videos and commercials

Name	Year	Starring
McDonald's commercial	2002	Stephen Chow
World Children Fund commercial	2002	Stephen Chow, Fan Zhiyi (范志毅)
諾曼奇服裝.廣告	2002	Zhao Wei
Miriam Yeung music video	2002	Miriam Yeung
Hong Kong Film Awards short film	2002	Andrew Lau, 麥邵輝
高科電器	2004	Fan Bingbing

Movies

Name	Year	Starring
老泥妹	1993	
尖東雙虎	1994	張耀楊
深圳之虎	1994	林文龍
我是一個賊	1995	任達華, 邱淑貞
Knock Off	1997	Directed by Tsui Hark
還我情深	1998	蔡少芬, 吳奇隆
緣份2000	1999	趙薇, 吳奇隆
15歲半	1999	尹楊明, 黎耀祥, 麥家琪
山狗1999	1999	黃秋生
古女:2	1999	楊恭如, 何超儀, 唐文龍
暗鬥	2000	何潤東, 張文慈, 倉田保昭
鐵男本色	2000	尹楊明, 吳家麗, 于榮光, 黃光亮
無期徒刑	2000	Francis Ng
千蟲與化骨龍	2000	李修賢, 張家輝
洪興大飛傳	2000	黃秋生, 麥家琪, 魏駿
古鏡怪談	2000	林心如, 謝霆鋒, 徐帆
千等一天	2000	沈傲君, 尹子慧
紫色的夢	2001	譚小燕, 李樂
Shaolin Soccer	2001	Stephen Chow (周星馳), 趙薇, 莫文蔚, 張柏芝
飄揚中的紅領巾 (Mainland children's theme film)	2002	
Highblinders (U.S. foreign language film)	2002	Jackie Chan
非一般刑警	2003	國內 (合拍片)
12.58	2004	蘇華偉
Ultraviolet (U.S. foreign language film)	2004	
龍威父子	2005	洪金寶, 黃曉明
The Last Hour (France foreign language film)	2005	
俏黄容	2006	錢昇瑋
Deep Gold (U.S. foreign language film)	2007	
合約情人	2007	范冰冰, 任賢齊, Alfred Cheung, directed by 元華
分身情侶	2007	馮德倫, 應采兒

=== As director ===
Name	Year	Starring
高科電器 (commercial)	2004	Fan Bingbing
親情回歸 (television movie)	2002	Loletta Lee, 蓋克, Wong Yut Fei (黃一飛)
大件事 (music video)	2006	Patrick Tang (鄧健泓)
戒不掉妳 (music video)	2006	Patrick Tang (鄧健泓)
