= Journey to the West II =

Hong Kong fantasy television series

- Cover art

Chinese name
- Traditional Chinese: 西遊記 (貳)
- Simplified Chinese: 西游记 (贰)
Transcriptions
Standard Mandarin
- Hanyu Pinyin: Xī Yóu Jì Èr
Yue: Cantonese
- Jyutping: Sai1 Jau4 Gei3 Ji6
- Genre: Chinese mythology, shenmo, fantasy, adventure
- Based on: Journey to the West by Wu Cheng'en
- Screenplay by: Cheung Wah-biu
- Directed by: Fong Chun-chiu
- Starring: Benny Chan; Kwong Wah; Wayne Lai; Evergreen Mak
- Narrated by: Jimmy Kwok
- Theme music composer: Aki Kubota
- Opening theme: Chui Yat Nim (取一念) performed by Benny Chan
- Country of origin: Hong Kong
- Original language: Cantonese
- No. of episodes: 42

Production
- Producer: Lau Sze-yu
- Production location: Hong Kong
- Running time: 45 minutes per episode
- Production company: TVB

Original release
- Network: TVB Jade
- Release: 26 October – 19 December 1998

Related
- Journey to the West (1996)

Journey to the West II is a Hong Kong television series adapted from the 16th-century novel Journey to the West. The series was produced by TVB and was first broadcast on TVB Jade in Hong Kong from October to December 1998. It is a sequel to the 1996 television series Journey to the West, also produced by TVB, which covered only the first half of the novel. Benny Chan replaces Dicky Cheung as Sun Wukong in this installment, while the other principal cast members Kwong Wah, Wayne Lai and Evergreen Mak reprise their roles from the previous installment.

== Cast ==
=== Main cast ===
- Benny Chan as Sun Wukong
- Kwong Wah as Tang Sanzang
- Wayne Lai as Zhu Bajie
- Evergreen Mak as Sha Wujing
- Tong Chun-ming as White Dragon Horse

=== Other cast ===
Note: Some cast members played multiple roles.

- Rebecca Chan as Princess Iron Fan
- Gordon Liu as Bull Demon King, Golden Horned King
- Chillie Poon as Mantangjiao
- Derek Kok as Interconnected-Arm Gibbon
- Kingdom Yuen as Crow Demon
- Joyce Chan as Little Cloud Sparrow, Xiaocui
- Angie Cheung as Python Demon (formerly the Sparrow Fairy until she's cursed by another Python Demon)
- Danny Summer as Yellow Brows Great King
- Joyce Koi as Guanyin
- Chor Yuen as Buddha
  - Wong Wai-leung as Siddhartha (the Buddha before he attained nirvana)
- Lau Dan as Venerable Zhihui
- Wong Wai as Subhuti
- Paul Chun as Maitreya, Elephant Demon
- Lee Lung-kei as Jade Emperor
- Leung Bo-jing as Queen Mother of the West
- Louisa So as Eldest Fairy Xueliang, Queen
- Joe Ma as Erlang Shen
- Ken Lok as Celestial Hound
- Cheung Ying-choi as Taibai Jinxing
- Melissa Ng as Nüwa
- Wah Chung-nam as Taishang Laojun
- Suen Kwai-hing as Nanji Xianweng, Constable
- Yu Tze-ming as Day Duty Star, Turtle Chancellor
- Kwok Tak-shun as Old Man under the Moon, Master Cheng
- Cindy Au as Shancai (Red Boy)
- Lo Mang as Li Jing
- Mimi Lo as Nezha
- Wong Tin-dok as Earth Deity
- Chan Chung-kin as Manjusri
- Ron Ng as Mahākāśyapa
- Yau Biu as Duke of Thunder
- Suen Yan-ming, Doi Siu-man, Siu Cheuk-yiu, Kon Tze-cheng as Four Heavenly Kings
- Fung Sui-jan as Granny of Wind
- Lily Liew as Woman of Clouds
- Au Kar-wai as Deity of Thunder
- Chan Wing-chun as Lü Dongbin, Immortal Zhenyuan
- Wong Wai-tak as Han Xiangzi, Crown prince of Wuji
- Wong Fung-king as He Xiangu
- Mak Ka-lun as Lan Caihe
- Leung Kin-ping as Royal Uncle Cao
- Koo Ming-wah as Zhongli Quan
- Wong Wai-lam as Iron Crutch Li
- Lee Hoi-sang as Elder Zhang Guo
- Sherming Yiu as Chang'e, Princess Wencheng
- Ng Man-sang as An Jing Si
- Lee Chi-wah as Ning Shen Si
- Tong Chun-sang as Mingyue
- Elton Loo as Cowherd
- Lo Cheuk-nam as Juling Shen
- Lau Kong as Old Dragon King
- Lily Li as Dragon Queen
- Law Lok-lam as Dragon King of the East Sea, Chen Guangrui (King of Wuji)
- May Kwong as Princess Pearl
- Akina Hong as Oyster Spirit, Meticulous Devil
- Yu Mo-lin as Turtle Chancellor's wife, Fish Demon
- Yip Chun-sing as Shrimp General
- Cheng Ka-sang as King Yama
- Tang Yu-chiu as Hell Judge
- Cheung Chung-ji as Hell guard
- Poon Chi-man as Emperor Taizong of Tang
- Choi Kwok-hing as Wei Zheng
- Wong Man-biu as Yuchi Gong
- Mak Tze-wun as Fang Xuanling
- Chiu Shek-man as Xu Shiji
- Yu Tin-wai as Du Ruhui
- Chun Hung as Cheng Yaojin, Silver Horned King, Beggar
- Cheung Hung-cheung as Li Jiancheng
- Leung Kin-ping as Li Yuanji
- Joey Leung as Black Bear Demon
- Mariane Chan as White Bone Demon
- Rain Lau as Spider Demon (En'en)
- Law Lan as Spider Demon (En'en's mother) / Golden and Silver Horned Kings' mother
- Lee Wai-kei as Lion Demon
- Lam Chun-leung as Six-Eared Macaque
- Andy Tai as King of Spiritual Touch
- Irene Wong as Little Peng Girl
- Kenny Wong as Dream Demon
- Kwan Ching as King of Rakshasa, Rhinoceros Demon
- Lau Kwai-fong as Queen of Rakshasa
- Tsang Kin-ming as King of India
- Lee Hung-kit as King of Xinluo, Abbot of Pulin Monastery
- Law Kwok-hung as King of Gaochang
- So Yan-tze as Queen of Gaochang
- Chan On-ying as Witty Bug
- Felix Lok as Elder Jinchi
- Yim Man-hin
- Candy Chiu as Porcupine Demon
- Samuel Yau as Golden-Haired Hou
- Lee Kwok-lun as Yang Songbai (Erlang Shen's father)
- Emily Kwan as Second Fairy Xueyao Bingqing
- Dickson Li as Dragon King of Qingshui River
- Safina Lam as Little Snow Demon
- Poon Bing-seung as Queen of Zhuzi
- Law Kwan-tso as Qingfeng
