= The Kung Fu Scholar =

1993 Hong Kong film by Norman Law

- Taiwanese film poster with alternate Chinese title
- Traditional Chinese: 倫文敘老點柳先開
- Simplified Chinese: 伦文叙老点柳先开
- Hanyu Pinyin: Lún Wénxù Lǎodiǎn Liǔ Xiānkāi
- Jyutping: Leon4 Man4 Zeoi6 Lou5 Dim2 Lau2 Sin1 Hoi1
- Directed by: Norman Law
- Written by: Yip Kai; Lai Man Cheuk
- Produced by: Rover Tang; Alan Tang
- Starring: Aaron Kwok; Vivian Chow; Dicky Cheung; Ng Man-tat; Bryan Leung; Gordon Liu
- Cinematography: Joe Chan; Lau Hung-chuen
- Edited by: Poon Hung
- Music by: Henry Lai Wan-man; Tang Siu-lam
- Distributed by: In-Gear Films
- Release dates: 31 December 1993 (VHS); 13 January 1994 (Hong Kong)
- Running time: 91 minutes
- Country: Hong Kong
- Language: Cantonese
- Box office: HK$8,384,786

The Kung Fu Scholar is a 1993 Hong Kong martial arts comedy film directed by Norman Law and starring Aaron Kwok, Vivian Chow and Dicky Cheung.

== Plot ==
Lun Man-chui (Dicky Cheung) and Lau Sin-hoi (Aaron Kwok) are students at Ming College who always disputed with each other. Lun is a poor but smart scholar who liked to do petty tricks on others. Lau is a straightforward and smart man who is martial artist since he was a kid. They both fall for their beautiful classmate Ching-ching (Vivian Chow), who is Headmaster Heung's (Ng Man-tat) niece. Later, a competition arises between Ming College and its rival, Oriental College. To win in the competition, Headmaster Heung hires martial arts expert Lee Tai-chun (Bryan Leung) to teach the students. Lee is being pursued by Imperial Secret Agents and took the job to cover up his real identity. On the day of the competition, Lee was found by the Imperial Secret Agents, however, with the help of Lun and Lau, Lee manages to escape and they make their way back to the competition and triumphed. From then on, Lun and Lau become best friends.

== Cast ==
- Dicky Cheung as Lun Man-chui
- Aaron Kwok as Lau Sin-hoi
- Vivian Chow as Ching-ching
- Ng Man-tat as Headmaster Heung
- Bryan Leung as Lee Tai-chun / Lee Man-lung
- Gordon Liu as His Excellency
- Kent Cheng as Fat Cat
- Kingdom Yuen as Lun Man-chui's mother
- Johnny Tang as Tang Lin-yu
- Anderson Junior as Oriental College's spectacled bully
- Michael Chow as Oriental College's bully
- Wong San as Mr. Chin
- Sam Wong as Eunuch Ngai
- Hoi Sang Lee as Copper Head
- Chan Tik-hak as Casino manager
- Teresa Ha as Granny beggar
- Wong Yat-fei as Oriental College's servant
- Wong Wai-wu as Waiter Shui
- Bobby Yip as Lau Sin-hoi's servant beating Fat Cat
- Joey Leung as Lau Sin-hoi's friend
- Gabriel Wong as Oriental College's quiz contestant
- Lo Hung as College quiz moderator
- Peter Lai as Lu Restaurant's boss
- Pak Yan as Tang Lin-yu's mother
- Baby Bo as Ching-ching's cousin
- Ho Pak-kwong as Cantonese Association representative
- Ling Hon as Oriental College headmaster
- Wong Hung as tea house waiter
- Cheng Ka-sang as lecherous customer
- Tony Tam as one of Eunuch's men
- Wong Ka-leung as one of Eunuch's men

== Box office ==
The film grossed HK$8,384,786 at the Hong Kong box office during its theatrical run from 13 to 16 January in Hong Kong.
