= Young Hero Fong Sai Yuk =

Hong Kong TV series

- Also known as: Young Master of Shaolin; Young Hero Fong Sai-yuk
- Genre: Costume drama, martial arts, comedy
- Written by: Chan Sap-sam; Lee Yee-wah
- Directed by: Wen Weiji; Tan Youye; Li Huizhu
- Opening theme: "Jui Fan Chan" ("醉凡塵") performed by Johnny Yip
- Country of origin: Hong Kong
- Original language: Cantonese
- No. of episodes: 40

Production
- Producer: Yeung Siu-hung
- Production location: Hong Kong
- Running time: 45 minutes per episode
- Production companies: ATV; TVB

Original release
- Network: ATV/TVB (Hong Kong); Sanlih E-Television (Taiwan)

Young Hero Fong Sai Yuk
- Chinese: 少年英雄方世玉
Transcriptions
Standard Mandarin
- Hanyu Pinyin: Shàonián Yīngxíong Fāng Shìyù
Yue: Cantonese
- Jyutping: Siu3 Nin4 Jing1 Hung4 Fong1 Sai3 Juk6

Young Hero Fang Shiyu is a 1999 Hong Kong television series based on the story of Chinese folk hero Fang Shiyu. It starred Dicky Cheung as the titular protagonist.

== Plot ==
In the beginning, Fang Shiyu was a troublemaker in Guangzhou, constantly fighting. His mother, Miao Cuihua, helps him in clearing him of his troubles when he is confronted by his father Fang De. Fang De is harsh and gives punishments, however Fang Shiyu works with his mother on ways to get them out of trouble. After many instances, Fang De decided to have a tutor school him. One of Fang Shiyu's adversaries decided to play a trick on him. They stole Hong Xiguan's money and made it seem that Fang Shiyu stole the bag. Hong Xiguan believed that Fang Shiyu was the thief and fought him in public. After more violence, Fang De decides to send his son to Hangzhou so that Fang Shiyu could be schooled.

== Cast ==
- Dicky Cheung as Fang Shiyu
- He Meitian as Ling Xiaoxiao
- Louis Fan as Hong Xiguan
- Miki Lee as Yan Yongchun
- Tien Niu as Miao Cuihua
- Zhang Zhenhuan as Fang De
- Wong Yat-fei as Miao Xian
- Zheng Guolin as Hu Huigan
- Xie Na as Xiaoli
- Cheng Pei-pei as Wumei
- Shen Meng-sheng as Sande
- Sin Ho-ying as Zhineng
- Yu Liwen as Zhishan
- Wang Weiguo as Yan Zhan
- Liu Dacheng as Guan Fuzi
- Lu Xingyu as Tong Qianjin
- Zhuo Fan as Lei Renwang
- Zhao Jian as Lei Laohu
- Kiki Sheung as Li Xiaohuan
- Li Haixing as Li Bashan
- Huang Haibing as Chou Wanqian
- Chan Hung-lit as Pak Mei
- Zhu Yan as Sun Qing
- Zhang Chunzhong as Feng Daode
- Zhang Shaohua as Matchmaker
- Elvis Tsui

== See also ==
- Fong Sai-yuk (1993 film)
