= Dicky Cheung =

Hong kong actor and singer

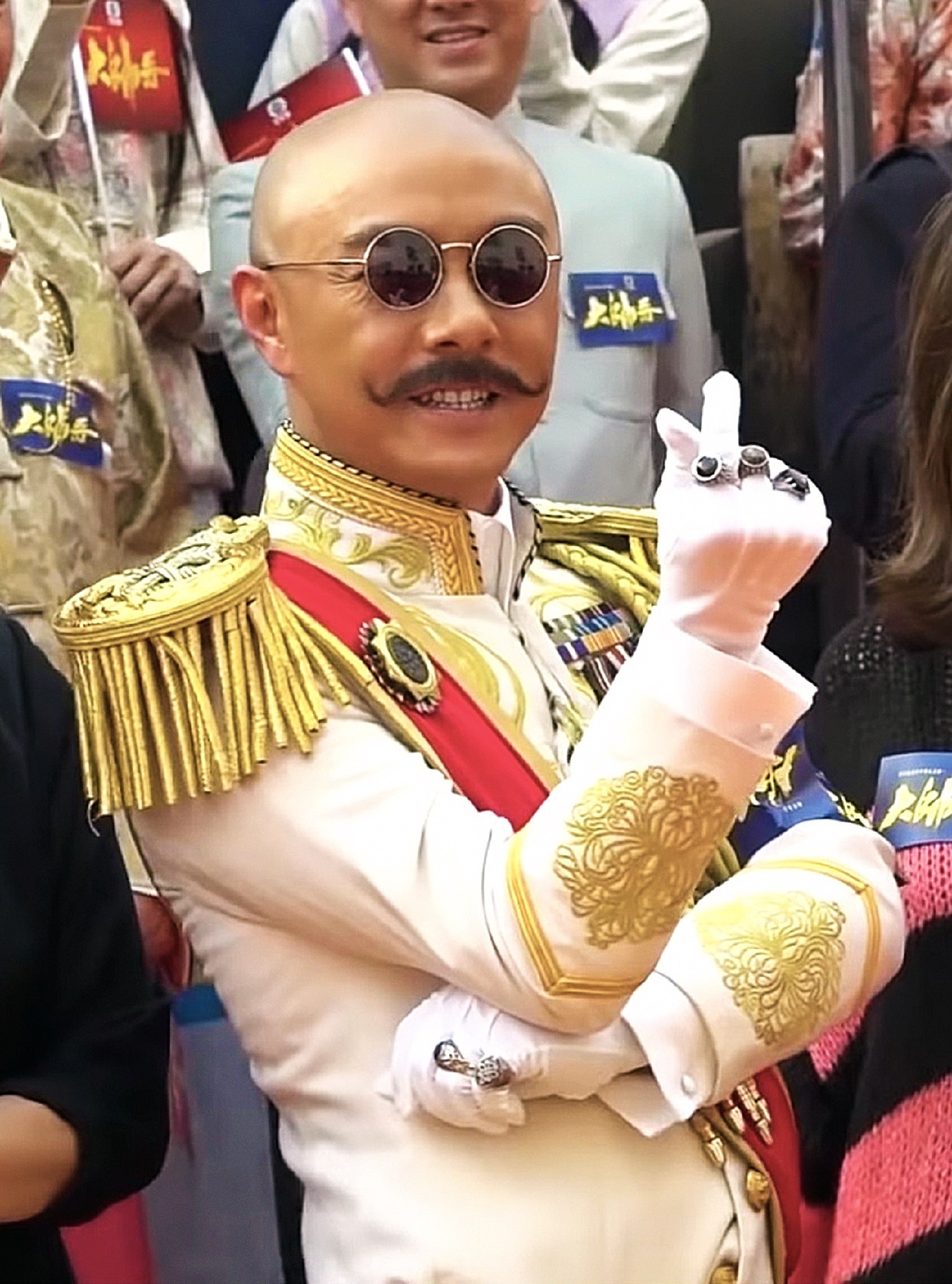
- Cheung in 2018
- Born: Cheung Wai-kin; Hong Kong
- Occupations: Actor; singer
- Years active: 1984–present
- Spouse: Jess Zhang Qian (m. 2004)
- Awards: New Talent Singing Awards; 1984 Winner TVB Anniversary Awards – All-Time Most Memorable Male Leading Roles; 1996 Journey to the West; My Favourite Television Character; 2001 The Duke of Mount Deer

Chinese name
- Traditional Chinese: 張衛健
- Simplified Chinese: 张卫健
Transcriptions
Standard Mandarin
- Hanyu Pinyin: Zhāng Wèijiàn
Yue: Cantonese
- Jyutping: Zoeng1 Wai6 Gin6
- Musical career
- Also known as: Dicky, WaiKin, Killer, Jianzai, Dicky Zai
- Genres: Pop
- Instrument: Vocal
- Member of: Big Four

Dicky Cheung Wai-kin (Chinese: 張衛健; Jyutping: Zoeng1 Wai6 Gin6) is a Hong Kong actor and singer.

== Early childhood ==
Cheung grew up with a physically abusive father. His parents divorced when Cheung was 14.

Cheung was educated in St Francis Xavier's College in Hong Kong. He became interested in acting when he was in elementary school, stemming from his interest in analyzing human behaviour. For example, he always loved being in crowded streets or buses, where he could observe people and hear conversations. In plays, he would work as director, actor, and scriptwriter.

In 1984, he won the TVB International Chinese New Talent Singing Championship. However, it was not a good start of his singing career. No record company wanted to sign a contract with him. So he changed his career path to acting. In 1985, he signed a contract with TVB. However, the following eight years he only acted in small parts until 1991 when he finally got the chance to be the main actor in the TVB drama called "Laoyou Guigui" ("A Step Beyond"). Later, he gained the lead role in Journey to the West, where he gained many fans and supporters in Hong Kong.

== Career ==
He entered show business in the early 1980s, signing a contract with television station TVB. He won the third annual New Talent Singing Awards in 1984. Up until the mid-90s, Cheung struggled for many years working as a low-paid actor, singer and appeared occasionally in films. It was not until his portrayal of the Monkey King character in the 1996 TVB drama Journey to the West, an adaptation of the classical Chinese novel Journey to the West, that his popularity began to skyrocket. A sequel to the TV adaptation was planned, but due to a contract dispute with TVB, Cheung left before production began. Benny Chan Ho Man took over the role of the Monkey King in the sequel. Cheung then went abroad to Taiwan to continue his career.

Cheung's most notable performance that made him famous was his portrayal of the Monkey King in the 1996 TVB adaptation of the classic Chinese tale Journey to the West. As well as being the lead character, Cheung also sang the theme song as well as many other songs throughout the series. This series was very popular during its run on TVB Jade, it was even dubbed in English and broadcast on TVB Pearl, the only TVB series to receive this treatment to date. Cheung was also due to play the Monkey King in the sequel. However, due to a dispute regarding the contract, the role was given to Benny Chan Ho Man.

He has appeared in many Taiwanese television productions since going to Taiwan. In 1999, TVB's rival station ATV acquired the Hong Kong broadcasting rights to his Taiwanese television series Young Hero Fong Sai Yuk. Cheung played Fong Sai Yuk, a character also portrayed by Jet Li in his film Fong Sai Yuk. The show was an instant hit in Hong Kong and managed to gain much higher ratings than TVB's own television series. The TVB series showing at that time was Dragon Love, starring Benny Chan Ho Man, who replaced Cheung in the Journey to the West sequel,

In one of the TV adaptations of Louis Cha's Wuxia novel The Deer and the Cauldron. Cheung played the anti-hero Wai Siu-Bo, a character previously portrayed by Tony Leung Chiu-Wai, Stephen Chow and Jordan Chan in many television and film adaptations, in The Duke of Mount Deer.

In 2001, Andy Lau's NMG production company produced another television adaptation of Journey to the West. Cheung was given a chance to once again portray the role in The Monkey King: Quest for the Sutra. The series was broadcast in 2002 on TVB. Although it received high ratings, many felt it was not as good as the 1996 version.

Cheung played Shun in Kung Fu Soccer, a young talented soccer player originated from rural Guangdong whose also excels in kung-fu, yet suffers from short-term memory loss. The series was broadcast by TVB from December 2004 to January 2005, with Cheung sang the opening theme of the series.

After a 20-year absence, Cheung made his TVB comeback. He starred in TVB's 50th anniversary drama, The Learning Curve of a Warlord <大帥哥>, which was produced by Steven Tsui.

== Personal life ==
At the end of 1997, Cheung met his wife Jess Zhang (Zhang Qian), an actress in China. They were filming in the same location on separate productions. They formally met each other when Jess was humming the tune of "哎呀哎呀親親你" (Aiya, Aiya, Kissing You) and did not know who originally sang the song nor realize the original singer was in her presence. Their relationship then further developed when Cheung purchased a water bottle for Jess. In 2004，Cheung married Jess in Nanjing and had a separate wedding ceremony in Boracay in 2009.

Prior to his marriage with Jess, he was involved in brief relationships with the actresses Elvina Kong and Jessica Hsuan.

He has said that he would like to eventually leave the acting business and seriously consider doing something more meaningful in life such as volunteering to give back to the society.

== Filmography ==
=== Television ===
- Lego Monkie Kid (2020)
- The Learning Curve of a Warlord (Chinese: 大帥哥) (2018)
- Swordsman (2013)
- Heroes of Sui and Tang Dynasties 1 & 2 (2012)
- The Legend of Hundred Family Surnames (2011)
- The Next Magic (2011)
- Shi Da Qi Yuan (2008)
- The Kung Fu Master Wong Fei Hung (2008) – Wong Fei Hung
- Project A (2007)
- Ayo (2007)
- The Proud Twins (2005)
- Magic Chef (2005)
- The Royal Swordsmen (2005)
- The Luckiest Man (2005)
- The Legend of the Treasure Basin (2004)
- Kung Fu Soccer (2004)
- The Luckiest Man (2003)
- The Monkey King: Quest for the Sutra (2002) – Sun Wukong
- Mr. Winner (2002)
- Taiji Prodigy (2002)
- Smart Kid (2001)
- The New Adventures of Chor Lau-heung (2001)
- The Duke of Mount Deer (2000)
- Chess Warriors (1999)
- Swordsman I (1999)
- Young Hero Fang Shiyu (1999) – Fang Shiyu
- Happy Flying Dragon I, II, III (1997)
- The Witty Attorney (1997)
- Journey to the West (1996) – Sun Wukong
- The Buddy Gang (1995)
- Money and Fame (1992)
- Edge of Righteousness (1992)
- Wong Fei Hung Returns (1992) – Wong Fei Hung
- Mystery of the Twin Swords II (1992)
- Mystery of the Twin Swords (1991)
- The Little boy from China (1991)
- The Legend of the Book and the Sword (1987)

=== Films ===
Year	English title	Chinese title	Role
1985	Crazy Games	瘋狂遊戲	
1985	Young Cops	青春差館	Lan Pili
1985	Puppy Love	鬥氣小神仙	Mi Gao
1988	The Good, the Bad & the Beauty	鬼馬保鏢賊美人	Policeman
1989	The Last Duel	再起風雲	Genghis Khan
1989		福祿雙星	
1989	The Mentor	變節小人物	Zhang Chengming
1991	The Dare Devils	特技雙雄	Wang Guoxing
1992	The Thief of Time	Chinese: 羣星會	Xiao Bing
1992	To Miss With Love	逃學外傳	Zhang Yijian
1993	My Hero 2	一本漫畫闖天涯2之妙想天開	Zhang Jiankang
1993	Last Hero in China	黃飛鴻之鐵雞鬥蜈蚣	Yacasu
1993	Hero of Hong Kong 1949	壹九四九之劫後英雄傳	Chang Xiedi
1993	Holy Weapon	武俠七公主	Wu Tong
1993	Hero – Beyond the Boundary of Time	正牌韋小寶之奉旨勾女	Ya Chao
1993	Even Mountains Meet	情天霹靂之下集大結局	
1993	Future Cops	超級學校霸王	Chen Daxiong
1993	Vampire family	壹屋哨牙鬼	Di Long
1993	Chez'n Ham	芝士火腿	Zhi Shi
1993	Prince of Portland Street	缽蘭街大少	Da Dou
1993	The Black Panther Warriors	黑豹天下	Computer child prodigy
1994		欲霸天下	Qiu Zihong
1994	The Kung Fu Scholar	倫文敘老點柳先開	Lun Man Chui
1994	Shaolin Popey II: Messy Temple	笑林小子II之新烏龍院	Huang Ningmeng
1997	The Dicky's Music Love Story	音樂愛情故事	
1997		知解時空	Zhang Haobei
2003	Golden Chicken 2	金雞2	Gao Shuiwen
2008	The Winners	奪標	Zhang Feng
2010	72 Tenants of Prosperity	72家租客	Zhi Dashi
2011	Summer Love Love	夏日戀神馬	Paranoid
2012	I Love Hong Kong 2012	2012我愛HK 喜上加囍	
2013	The Palace	宮鎖沈香	Eunuch

Preceded by Fong Lui 呂方	New Talent Singing Awards winner 1984	Succeeded by Alex To 杜德偉
