= The King of Yesterday and Tomorrow =

- Official poster
- 九五至尊
- Genre: Comedy drama Time travel
- Written by: Chan Ching-yee; Choi Ting-ting
- Starring: Kwong Wa; Maggie Cheung Ho-yee; Melissa Ng
- Theme music composer: Tse Hak-lam
- Opening theme: Choi Kau Bo (彩構步) by Kwong Wa
- Ending theme: Yin Juk Yat Sang Dik Mei Lai (延續一生都美麗) by Kwong Wa
- Country of origin: Hong Kong
- Original language: Cantonese
- No. of episodes: 20

Production
- Executive producer: Siu Hin-fai
- Production location: Hong Kong
- Camera setup: Multi camera
- Running time: 45 mins. (each)
- Production company: TVB

Original release
- Network: TVB Jade
- Release: 27 January – 21 February 2003

The King of Yesterday and Tomorrow (Chinese: 九五至尊; Jyutping: gau2 ng5 zi3 zyun1) is a Hong Kong comedy television drama produced by Siu Hin-fai and TVB. It originally aired on TVB Jade from 27 January to 21 February 2003. According to legend, the Yongzheng Emperor of the Qing dynasty may not have died of natural causes and was actually assassinated. The plot is an imaginative time-traveling story based on the continuation of what happens after the assassination attempt.

With an average of 2.21 million viewers (34 points), the drama is the fourth highest rating drama series of 2003. It received five nominations at the TVB Anniversary Awards, winning four. Maggie Cheung Ho-yee won the TVB Anniversary Award for Best Actress and one of twelve My Favourite Television Character awards, while Paul Chun won My Favourite Powerhouse Actor. Kwong Wa was nominated for the TVB Anniversary Award for Best Actor, and won one of twelve My Favourite Television Character awards.

The name of the show is a pun as 九五 refers to both the scope of the Emperor's power (九五至尊 means the most respected person who holds dominion over the nine X and five X) and also to office work hours (九五 is short for 九到五, meaning Nine to Five).

== Plot ==
=== Qing dynasty ===
The story begins in the Qing dynasty, China with Yongzheng Emperor disguising himself among commoners to have a meal outside the imperial courts. At the restaurant he encounters a woman named Lui Sei-leung who was under attack by loan sharks for not returning debts. The emperor comes across her situation, and pays off the debt for her. Later during a ship departure, Lui approaches the emperor and thanks him for his deed. She suddenly reveals herself to be a Ming Dynasty revolutionist and attempts to kill the emperor. The boat is then all of a sudden caught in a time-traveling vortex/hurricane.

=== Modern Hong Kong ===
When they wake up, they are both warped to modern Hong Kong in 2003. The assassin continues her mission to assassinate the emperor in the city, only to find out that he became a commoner and impersonates Lee Dai-ha (literally Big Shrimp Lee). The emperor is somewhat fascinated by the Bermuda Triangle and was looking for explanations of his time travel. They also learn about the fall of the Qing dynasty including the rise of the 1911 Xinhai Revolution and founding of modern China through a historic TV video, which also mentioned the emperor's death was shrouded in some mystery.

Both the emperor and the assassin encounter difficulties with HK daily life, culture and society. They both end up working in a company that sells kitchen tiles. The assassin saved a company owner from a kidnapping and becomes his bodyguard. The emperor, likewise, ends up working for the same company through a chance encounter. The emperor's talents are noticed and appreciated by the owner, the owner's third son, as well as many other employees. Likewise, after some initial difficulties, the assassin becomes well-liked by her the owner, the owner's third son, as well as many other coworkers for her honesty, friendliness, loyalty, and willingness to help others. The emperor later fell in love with Rachel, the fourth child of the company's owner. The story then becomes a more romantic drama, as the assassin also falls in love with him. She feels there is a special connection between them since they both were from the same dynasty. They end up living together with a host of other characters. The show also contains mini plots such as Ko King getting accused of carrying illegal drugs in a club, Hugo and Kenneth's homosexual relationship, and many other side stories.

== Cast ==
- Kwong Wa as Yongzheng Emperor / Lee Dai-ha (李大蝦)
- Maggie Cheung Ho-Yee as Assassin Lui Sei-leung (呂四娘)
- Melissa Ng as Rachel Shum Yat-oi (岑日愛)
- Gilbert Lam as Frankie Shum Yat-lai (岑日禮)
- Paul Chun as Shum Shiu-hong (岑兆康)
- Anthony Tang as Hugo Shum Yat-hau (岑日孝)
- Ram Chiang as Brian Shum Yat Chung (岑日忠)
- Halina Tam as Tina Wan Tin-la (尹天娜)
- June Chan as Po Chu (寶珠)
- Lo Meng as Po Fei (寶飛)
- Joe Cheng as Ko King (高勁)
- Jack Wu as Po On (寶安)
- Gordon Liu as Heung Yeung (向陽)
- Akina Hong as Szeto Yuk-ming (司徒旭明)
- Edmond So as Kenneth Ma
- Mark Kwok as Marco
- Derek Kok as 14th Imperial Uncle (十四皇爺)
- Savio Tsang as 8th Imperial Uncle (八皇爺)

== Viewership ratings ==
The following is a table that includes a list of the total ratings points based on television viewership. "Viewers in millions" refers to the number of people, derived from TVB Jade ratings, in Hong Kong who watched the episode live. The peak number of viewers are in brackets.

Week	Episode(s)	Average points	Peaking points	Viewers (in millions)	References
1	1 — 5	32	36	2.08 (2.34)	
2	6 — 10	29	N/A	1.88	
3	11 — 15	37	39	2.40 (2.53)	
4	16 — 20	40	46	2.60 (2.98)	

== See also ==
- A Step into the Past
