= Magic Chef (TV series) =

Hong Kong television series

- Official poster
- 伙頭智多星
- Genre: Comedy drama
- Written by: Mark Wu; Lau Man-wai; Cheung Yin-wah; Shum Sek-yin
- Directed by: Poon Man-kit; Tam Long-cheong; Lee Ping-kwong; Tsui Wai-hong
- Starring: Gallen Lo; Francis Ng; Dicky Cheung; Andy Hui
- Theme music composer: Chan Kwong-wing
- Opening theme: Toying With Life (玩玩世) by Dicky Cheung
- Ending theme: Open Mouth (開口) by Gallen Lo
- Composers: Duck Lau; Ken Chan
- Country of origin: Hong Kong
- Original language: Cantonese
- No. of episodes: 30

Production
- Executive producers: Daneil Lam; Huang Jing; Stephen Shiu Jr.
- Producers: Poon Man-kit; Stephen Shiu Jr.
- Production locations: Hong Kong; Shenzhen, China
- Cinematography: Suen Chun-chiu; Wong Sek-wah; Yeung Choi-loi; Yeung Fat-leung
- Editor: Kwan Yiu-hung
- Camera setup: Multi camera
- Production companies: Universe (China) Development; Beijing Top Times Entertainment Investment; Guangzhou City Ying Ming Culture Communication; One Dollar Production

Original release
- Network: TVB Jade
- Release: 7 July – 17 August 2005

Magic Chef
- Traditional Chinese: 伙頭智多星
- Simplified Chinese: 伙头智多星
- Literal meaning: "The Mastermind Head Chef"
Transcriptions
Standard Mandarin
- Hanyu Pinyin: Huǒ Tóu Zhì Duō Xīng
Yue: Cantonese
- Jyutping: Fo2 Tau2 Zi3 Do1 Sing1

Magic Chef is a 2005 Hong Kong comedy-drama television series co-produced and distributed by Universe Entertainment and starring Gallen Lo, Francis Ng and Dicky Cheung as three brothers who work together to revive their family business of selling Wonton noodles after being framed by a rival.

== Cast ==
- Gallen Lo as Cheng Chung (鄭中)
- Francis Ng as Cheng Fat (鄭發)
- Dicky Cheung as Cheng Pak (鄭白)
- Andy Hui as Jack Yuen (元顏北)
- Law Kar-ying as Man Sai (文西)
- Kenny Kwan as Yip Siu-tung (易小東)
- Jess Zhang as Lok Man-yu (駱敏如)
- Chloe Chiu as Fei (阿菲)
- Chen Yichi as Lee Lai-lai (李麗麗)
- Gabriel Wong as Ship Bow Fai (船頭輝)
- Gabriel Harrison as Chan On (陳安)
- Emme Wong as Lucky Leung (梁好彩)
- Mango Wong as Wong Yeuk-nam (王若男)
- Alice Pang as Ngau Siu-wai (牛小慧)
- Wang Huichun as Lee Ping-woon (李炳煥)
- Wen Zhangrong as Cheung Siu-lei (張小莉)
- Chow Hin as Shum Sei (沈四)
- Jiang Kai as Yuen To (元滔)
- Lu Xingyu as Andy
- Zhang Shaohua as Plain Noodles Granny (齋面婆婆)
- Niu Zhenhua as Lau Sing (劉誠)
- Mandy Chiang as Yee (阿儀)
- Elanne Kong as Enomoto Lan (甜品姊妹花-榎本嵐)
- Bunchi Chan as Enomoto Nai (甜品姊妹花-榎本奈)
- Alex Man as Supreme Taster Law Hon (味至尊羅漢) (Special guest appearance)
