= Lun Wenxu =

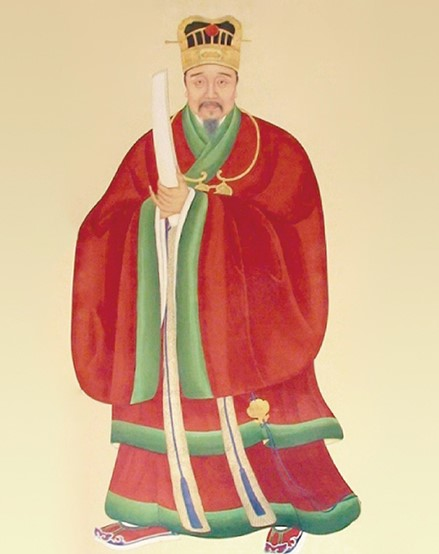
Lun Wenxu (1467-1513)

Lun Wenxu (Chinese: 倫文敘; Cantonese: Leon Man-zeoi; 1467–1513), also known as Lun Wen‑sui and Lun Man‑sui, courtesy name Bozhou (伯疇), style name Yugang (迂岡), was a native of Nanhai County (南海縣) in Guangdong, present-day Shiwan Town (石灣鎮), Chancheng District (禪城區), Foshan City, Guangdong Province. He was a renowned zhuangyuan (狀元; top scorer in the imperial examinations) and a celebrated man of letters during the Ming dynasty, widely praised as a "ghostly genius" (鬼才) for his extraordinary wit. Though born into poverty, he applied himself diligently to his studies from a young age and displayed literary talent early on. In popular folklore, he is remembered for his quick thinking, humor, and poetic talent, and his legendary contests of wit with Liu Xiankai (柳先開) have been retold for generations.

== Life ==
In the 2nd year of the Hongzhi reign (1489 AD; 弘治二年), Lun Wenxu placed 11th in the provincial examination for Guangdong in the jiyou circle (己酉科), earning the degree of juren (舉人). In the 12th year (1499 AD), he ranked first in the metropolitan examination for the jiwei cycle (己未科), becoming the huiyuan (會元, lit. top scorer). In the palace examination, he again took first place in the first class, attaining the title of zhuangyuan (狀元). His examination mentor was Xu Mu (徐穆), and he was appointed Compiler (修撰) in the Hanlin Academy (翰林院). In the 18th year of Hongzhi (May 1505), when the Zhengde Emperor (武宗) ascended the throne, Lun Wenxu was dispatched as chief envoy to announce the new reign to Annam (安南). The following year, while en route, he received news of his father’s death and returned home for mourning.

In the 5th year of Zhengde (November 1510), after completing the mourning period, he returned to the capital and resumed his post as Compiler. He also served as a lecturer in the imperial study sessions. In the 6th year (May 1511), he was promoted to Right Assistant Instructor of the Right Spring Palace and concurrently served as Lecturer, participating in the compilation of the imperial genealogical records. In the 8th year of Zhengde (July 1513), he was appointed chief examiner for the provincial examination in Yingtian Prefecture (應天府). After completing his duties and returning to the capital, he passed away in November of the same year.

== Family ==
Lun Wenxu’s ancestor Lun Cilu (倫次陸) was originally from Nanxiong Prefecture (南雄州) in the Eastern Circuit of Guangnan (廣南東路) in Song dynasty. He rose to the rank of Rulin Lang (儒林郎), served as Instructor (教諭) of Guangzhou Prefecture in Guangdong, and later moved to Kuigang (魁岡) in Nanhai, present‑day Liyong Village (黎涌村), Shiwanzhen, Foshan. His descendants thereafter became residents of Nanhai.

His grandfather was Lun Yu (倫敔), and his grandmother was of the Pang clan. His father was Lun Ming (倫明), and his mother was of the He clan. Under this household were four sons: Lun Wenxu, Lun Wenjing (倫文敬), Lun Wenfu (倫文敷), and Lun Wenze (倫文澈), with Lun Wenxu being the eldest. Lun Wenxu himself had five sons. The eldest, Lun Yiliang (倫以諒); the second, Lun Yixun (倫以訓); the third, Lun Yishen (倫以詵); and the fourth, Lun Yimo (倫以謨), were all born to his principal wife of the Ou clan. The fifth son, Lun Yie (倫以諤), was born to his secondary wife of the Kuang clan.

The eldest son, Lun Yiliang, placed first in the Guangdong provincial examination (解元; jieyuan) in the bingzi cycle (丙子科) of the 11th year of Zhengde (1516), and later became a jinshi (進士) in the xinsi cycle (辛巳科) of the 16th year (1521 AD). The second son, Lun Yixun, ranked first in the metropolitan examination (會元; huiyuan) in the dingchou cycle (丁丑科) of the 12th year of Zhengde (1517 AD), and in the same year placed second in the first class of the jinshi (榜眼; bangyan). The third son, Lun Yishen, became a jinshi in the wuxu cycle (戊戌科) of the 17th year of Jiajing (1538). Among them, Lun Wenxu, his eldest son Lun Yiliang, and his second son Lun Yixun each attained a “first place” title in their respective examinations. Father and sons, as well as brothers within the same household, all achieved top honors in the imperial examination system, earning them the collective reputation of the "Three Luns of Nanhai" (南海三倫).

== Works ==
Lun Wenxu authored The Yugang Collection (迂岡集) and The Baisha Collection (白沙集), among other writings.。

== Spin-offs ==
=== The Gifted Lun Wen‑sui ===
The Gifted Lun Wen‑sui (鬼才倫文叙) is a 1976 Cantonese opera historical comedy-drama film, starring Leung Hon‑wai (梁漢威) as Lun Wen‑sui; Chan Ho-kau (陳好逑), Lam Kar‑sing (林家聲), among others.

=== The Cunning Hustler ===
The Cunning Hustler (倫文敘與沙三少) is a classic comedy film released in Hong Kong on July 30, 1978. Directed by Wang Feng (王風) and written by Situ An (司徒安), the film revolves around the humorous adventures of its two protagonists, Lun Wenxu and Sha Sanshao. The main cast includes Chan Sze‑ka (陳思佳), Lo Kwok‑hung (盧國雄), Pan Bing‑chang (潘冰嫦), Ho Lin‑tai (何蓮蒂), and Lou Wan‑yin (盧宛茵), among others.

=== Lun Wenxu outwits Liu Xiankai ===
Lun Wenxu outwits Liu Xiankai (倫文敘智鬥柳先開, 1979) is a film directed by Wang Feng and written by Sita An. In the film, Lun Wenxu (played by Leung Tin, 梁天) and Liu Xiankai (played by Ku Kuan‑chung; 顧冠忠) not only trade wits and barbs, but also become entangled in a number of exaggerated, farcical romantic episodes typical of the era’s comedy style.

=== The Kung Fu Scholar ===
The Kung Fu Scholar (倫文敘老點柳先開, alt. 流氓狀元) is a 1993 Hong Kong comedy film, starring Dicky Cheung (張衛健) as Lun Wenxu and Aaron Kwok (郭富城) as Liu Xiankai (柳先開). This film is the best‑known cinematic portrayal, depicting their rivalry in the academy and their journey to the capital for the examinations.

=== The Legend of Lun Wen‑sui ===
The Legend of Lun Man‑sui (倫文敘傳奇) is a Cantonese opera directed by Leung Kin‑chung (梁建忠), written by Lam Yu (林榆) and performed by the First Troupe of the Guangdong Cantonese Opera Theatre (廣東粵劇院一團). The story follows Lun Man‑Siu, born into poverty and making a living selling vegetables. Diligent, eager to learn, and exceptionally gifted, he soon becomes widely admired for his talent. A wealthy gentry, Master Wu, wishes to take him as a son‑in‑law and sends his maid Sau to propose the match. Lun Wenxu refuses the Wu family’s offer, but instead takes a liking to Sau herself—insisting that the matchmaker should be the one to enter the bridal sedan chair. People say the threads of fate have been amusingly tangled.

Though poor, Lun Man‑sui consistently demonstrated ambition and gradually developed greater understanding through his experiences. At the imperial examination in the Golden Throne Hall (金鑾殿), the emperor himself called him "a mind blessed by Heaven" (天縱聰明). Lun Man‑sui surpassed his rival Lau Sin‑hoi and won first place, becoming the zhuangyuan, the top scholar of the realm. But becoming zhuangyuan means he must also become the emperor’s son‑in‑law. Lun Man‑sui, however, has never forgotten the pure‑hearted Sau from his village. Truly, winning the laurels was glorious, but becoming a royal groom was no easy fate.

== Anecdote ==
It is said that one day, Lun Wenxu delivered vegetables to the home of a local gentryman. Impressed by the young man’s talent, the gentryman invited him to compose a poem for his treasured painting—Su Dongpo’s authentic masterpiece Hundred Birds Returning to the Nest.

Lun Wenxu, who had always admired Su Dongpo’s poetry and calligraphy, lifted the brush and wrote:

Heaven gives one bird and then another;

Three four five six seven eight birds.

天生一隻又一隻，

三四五六七八隻。

Those watching were deeply disappointed. The lines seemed plain, lacking elegance or poetic charm.

Lun Wenxu merely smiled at their reaction. Calm and unhurried, he added another couplet:

Why so few phoenixes, why so many birds?

Pecking away the people’s grain by the tens of thousands.

鳳凰何少鳥何多？

啄盡人間千萬石。

The gentry asked him to explain the meaning to dispel everyone’s confusion. Lun Wen‑sui replied:

Hundred Birds Returning to the Nest—the word ‘nest’ (巢; Chao) sounds the same as ‘court’ (朝; Chao) [in Chinese]. The whole poem is saying that loyal and virtuous ministers are few, while treacherous officials dominate the court, draining the people’s wealth until they can no longer survive.	百鳥歸巢圖，巢、朝字同音，整篇文意是說，忠良賢士不多，奸佞當朝，搜括民脂民膏，以致民不聊生。

As for the earlier lines—"Heaven gives one bird and then another; three four five six seven eight birds"—what did they mean?

The answer lay in arithmetic: "One bird and then another" is 2 birds; "three four" means 3 times 4, equal to 12; "five six" means 5 times 6, equal to 30; "seven eight" means 7 times 8, equal to 56. And add them altogether is 100 — the exact number of birds in Su Dongpo’s Hundred Birds painting.

At this, everyone suddenly understood and praised him with raised thumbs, marveling at the brilliance of the poem.

== Bibliography ==
- 費宏等，《大明武宗毅皇帝實錄》
- 劉仕義，《新知錄摘抄》
- 李調元，《制義科瑣記》
- 李信明，《李學數說數學故事》，九章出版社，1998
