= Chess Warriors =

- DVD cover
- Also known as: Chinese Swordsman; Chess Swordsman
- Chinese: 棋武士
- Hanyu Pinyin: Qí Wǔshì
- Screenplay by: Kuo Cheng
- Directed by: Kuk Kok Leung
- Starring: Dicky Cheung; Howie Huang; Amy Fan; He Meitian; Che Xuan; Shen Meng-sheng; Wong Yat-fei; Chan Hung-lit
- No. of episodes: 20

Production
- Running time: 45 minutes

Chess warriors was a TV programme in 2001. It has a mixture of action and romance in the programme.

== Cast ==
- 張衛健 (Dicky Cheung) as Xuē Yípiào (薛一驃)- the red horse (later)
- 樊亦敏 as Lěng Yàn (冷豔)- the red Minister (later)
- 黃文豪 as Yuè Huáixiān (岳懷仙)- the red chariot and then the Marshal (later)
- 何美鈿 (He Meitian) as Yè Yèxīn (葉夜心)- the red advisor
- 車軒 as Lěng Zijīng (冷子京)- the King's chancellor
- 沈孟生 as Bā Léiwǔ (巴雷武)- the red chariot (later)

== Story ==
The story starts with a match of Chinese chess played between the ruler of the Chinese court, represented by the red pieces, and the Khitan king, represented by the black pieces. The match is staged using real people on the chess board, and each captured piece is killed in combat. As the game progresses, the Chinese king steadily loses ground, largely due to the secret betrayal of his chancellor, who is covertly allied with the Khitan ruler. Outside the palace, the chess enthusiast Xuē Yípiào observes the match and openly criticizes the king's poor strategy. Near the end of the game, the Chinese side is reduced to only two remaining pieces: the chariot and the minister. The chariot, Yuè Huáixiān, proves exceptionally skilled and manages to defeat several opponents. Alarmed by Yuè's effectiveness, the chancellor resolves to have him killed if he survives the match.

Yuè Huáixiān is ultimately overwhelmed by the Khitan chariot. Though he survives the encounter, he loses his right arm in battle. Witnessing his injury, the spectators—who had earlier been encouraged by his success—fall into despair. Yè Yèxīn, the daughter of a loyal general and a close friend of Yuè Huáixiān, is particularly distressed. Before the minister can be killed, the Chinese king concedes defeat, ending the match.

Yuè Huáixiān and the general are taken for medical treatment, but the chancellor falsely claims to be acting under royal orders and has them condemned to death. The general is executed, while Yuè Huáixiān narrowly survives and is discarded in a pigs pen to die. He is discovered by Xuē Yípiào, who brings him home to be treated by his blind mother. Meanwhile, Yè Yèxīn and her mother are expelled from the city; Yè escapes, but her mother is killed during the attempt.

Yuè Huáixiān recovers and forms a close friendship with Xuē Yípiào, marking the beginning of their shared journey. Xuē later develops romantic feelings for Yè Yèxīn. Upon learning that Yuè Huáixiān is still alive, the chancellor orders his daughter, Lěng Yàn, to arrange his assassination. Although she hires an assassin, Lěng Yàn begins to question her father's claims after observing Yuè's character. She grows close to Yuè Huáixiān and falls in love with him, concealing her identity as the chancellor's daughter. This leads to jealousy from Yè Yèxīn, and when Yuè later learns the truth, he distances himself from Lěng Yàn.

Over time, Lěng Yàn forms a close bond with Xuē Yípiào, and she gradually develops feelings for him as well. Yè Yèxīn and Yuè Huáixiān eventually reconcile and grow close again.

Finally, Lěng Yàn is revealed to be the biological daughter of Xuē Yípiào's adoptive mother, making her his half-sister by birth. It is also revealed that Xuē is the emperor's long-lost son, born to a late empress. Recognizing his true identity, the emperor appoints Xuē to lead the decisive chess match against the Khitan forces. The Khitan warriors are defeated, the chancellor is executed, and the emperor abdicates the throne in Xuē Yípiào's favor, naming him crown prince.
