= The Duke of Mount Deer (2000 TV series) =

2000 Hong Kong-Taiwanese TV series

- Official poster
- 小寶與康熙
- Genre: Wuxia; Comedy; Historical fiction
- Based on: The Deer and the Cauldron by Jin Yong
- Starring: Dicky Cheung; Patrick Tam
- Opening theme: "One Life, One Dream" (一輩子一場夢) by Dicky Cheung
- Ending theme: "You Love Me to be Like Who" (你愛我像誰) by Dicky Cheung
- Countries of origin: Hong Kong; Taiwan
- Original language: Mandarin
- No. of episodes: 40 (DVD); 48 (VCD)

Production
- Producers: GTV; TVB
- Running time: ≈45 minutes per episode (DVD); ≈35 minutes per episode (VCD)

Original release
- Network: GTV; TVB
- Release: 25 July 2000

The Duke of Mount Deer (小寶與康熙) is a Hong Kong-Taiwanese wuxia-comedy television series adapted from the novel The Deer and the Cauldron by Jin Yong. It was first broadcast in 2000 in Taiwan and followed by subsequent broadcasts in other regions.

== Synopsis ==
The story is set in the early Qing dynasty. Wei Xiaobao is an uneducated street urchin born and raised by his mother in a brothel in Yangzhou. Through a series of misadventures, he makes his way from Yangzhou to Beijing, where he accidentally bumbles into a fateful encounter with the young Kangxi Emperor. By hook or by crook, but also through a genuine concern and fierce loyalty towards the emperor, Wei finds himself in the greatest of confidences and a complicated friendship with one of the most eminent monarchs in Chinese history.

The plot follows Wei on a rags-to-riches journey as he becomes embroiled in political and court intrigues, helping the Kangxi Emperor overcome his enemies, and accomplishing amazing achievements. Along the way, Wei meets and successfully woos seven beautiful women, climbs his way up the social ladder from brothel boy to nobleman, acquiring titles such as "Imperial Emissary and Plenipotentiary", "Ambassador", "General", and "Admiral", as well as finding himself in positions completely at odds with the above: "Green Wood Lodge Master" of the Heaven and Earth Society, and "White Dragon Marshal" of the Mystic Dragon Cult.

In the end, however, Wei cannot reconcile his two separate lives — as an anti-Qing rebel and the Kangxi Emperor's devoted courtier. He chooses to give up his life to repay the emperor's munificence towards him and also as an honourable way out of the Heaven and Earth Society. Pained and aggrieved beyond words, the Kangxi Emperor orders the execution of his one and only true friend. Afterwards, plagued by loss and guilt, the emperor takes a long walk along the Great Wall, asking Heaven for guidance — only to be happily surprised by the appearance of Wei, who has survived. After saving his friend's life once again, Wei bids the emperor farewell, reaffirming their friendship which will, from that point onwards, remain only in their minds and memories.

== Cast ==
- Dicky Cheung as Wei Xiaobao
- Patrick Tam as the Kangxi Emperor
- Ruby Lin as Princess Jianning
- Annie Wu as Shuang'er
- Athena Chu as Ake
- Teresa Mak as Fang Yi
- Monica Chan as Long'er
- Shu Qi as Xiao Jinyu
- Jess Zhang as Mu Jianping
- Wong Yat-fei as Duolong
- Bryan Leung as Hu Dedi
- Ekin Cheng as Chan Jinnan
- Ng Man-tat as Hai Dafu
- Chen Kuan-tai as Hong Antong
- Zheng Guolin as Zheng Keshuang
- Elvis Tsui as Oboi

== VCD release ==
In 2002, Hong Kong's Television Broadcasts Limited (International) released The Duke of Mount Deer in a 24-disc VCD set with a total of 48 episodes, each about 35 minutes long. Viewers can choose to have the dialogue in Cantonese or Mandarin, along with subtitles in Traditional Chinese.
