= Wong Yat-fei =

Hong Kong actor (born 1946)

- Born: 19 August 1946 (age 80)
- Occupation: Actor
- Awards: Hong Kong Film Awards – Best Supporting Actor for Shaolin Soccer Golden Bauhinia Awards – Best Supporting Actor for Shaolin Soccer

Chinese name
- Traditional Chinese: 黃一飛
- Simplified Chinese: 黄一飞
Transcriptions
Yue: Cantonese
- Jyutping: Wong4 Yat1 Fei1

Wong Yat-fei (born 19 August 1946) is a Hong Kong cinema actor who has acted in numerous Cantonese films. Wong is best known for his role as Iron Head in Shaolin Soccer for which he won popular awards. He has appeared in more than 139 films in his career thus far.

== Selected filmography ==
=== Films ===
- The Royal Scoundrel (1991)
- Justice, My Foot! (1992)
- Hail the Judge (1994)
- Love in the Time of Twilight (1995)
- Out of the Dark (1995)
- Forbidden City Cop (1996)
- Shaolin Soccer (2001)
- Love Me, Love My Money (2001)
- Stolen Love (2001)
- Beauty and the Breast (2002)
- My Kung-Fu Sweetheart (2006)
- Kung Fu Dunk (2008)
- Magic Barber (2015)
- Lovely Devil (2015)
- Insomnia Lover (2016)
- Witch Walker (2018)

=== TV ===
- Mutual Affection (1996)
- State of Divinity (1996)
- The Hitman Chronicles (1997)
- Young Hero Fong Sai Yuk (1999)
- The Duke of the Mount Deer 2000 (2000)
- Chess Warriors (2001)
- Kung Fu Soccer (2004)
- Hail the Judge (2006)
- Justice, My Foot (2012)
