= Holy Weapon =

1993 Hong Kong film by Wong Jing

- Promotional poster
- 武俠七公主
- Directed by: Wong Jing
- Written by: Lam Wai-lun
- Produced by: Thomas Ng; Pooi Cheung-chuen
- Starring: Carol Cheng; Michelle Yeoh; Maggie Cheung; Simon Yam; Sharla Cheung; Dicky Cheung; Ng Man-tat; Sandra Ng; Damian Lau; Esther Kwan; Charline Chan
- Cinematography: Gigo Lee
- Edited by: Keung Chuen-tak; Chun Yu
- Music by: Danny Chung
- Production companies: Wong Jing's Workshop; Regal Films; Scholar Films
- Distributed by: Regal Films Distribution
- Release date: 3 June 1993
- Running time: 98 minutes
- Country: Hong Kong
- Language: Cantonese

Holy Weapon (武俠七公主), also known as The Seven Wuxia Princesses, is a 1993 Hong Kong wuxia comedy film directed by Wong Jing, starring an ensemble cast which included the titular seven "princesses" – Michelle Yeoh, Carol Cheng, Maggie Cheung, Sharla Cheung, Sandra Ng, Esther Kwan, and Charline Chan – and Damian Lau, Simon Yam, Dicky Cheung, and Ng Man-tat.

== Synopsis ==
The film is set in 17th-century China during the Ming dynasty when the wokou are harassing China's coastal regions. The Yagyū clan of Japan wishes to conquer the wulin of China so they send their best warrior Yagyū Seishin to challenge Shangguan Wuji, the top swordsman in the wulin. With the help of his friend Ghost Doctor, Shangguan manages to master a technique that allows him to defeat Yagyū, but it also causes him to enter a zouhuorumo state and kill innocents. His fiancée, Meng Qingsi, leaves him in anger, renames herself Dugu Zhen, and vows to kill all men who let their lovers down.

Ghost Doctor's apprentice Wu Tong escapes during his wedding as he does not want to marry Doll, who is eight years older than him. During this time, he encounters Princess Tianxiang, who is also running away from home, and her bodyguard Ren Jianhui. Meanwhile, two swordswomen, Butterfly and Spider, have come in search of a swordplay manual for their master. The seven women eventually converge at a brothel, where they realise that they have a common purpose.

== Cast ==
- Sandra Ng as Ren Jianhui
- Damian Lau as Shangguan Wuji
- Michelle Yeoh as Meng Qingsi / Dugu Zhen
- Sharla Cheung as Spider
- Maggie Cheung as Princess Tianxiang
- Carol Cheng as Doll
- Simon Yam as Yagyū Seishin
- Ng Man-tat as Ghost Doctor
- Dicky Cheung as Wu Tong
- Charine Chan as Butterfly
- Esther Kwan as Blonde
- Lee Siu-kei as Green Demon
