= He Meitian =

Chinese actress and gymnast

- Born: 2 December 1975 (age 50); Chaozhou, Guangdong, China
- Education: South China University of Technology
- Occupation: Actress
- Years active: 1995–present

Chinese name
- Traditional Chinese: 何美鈿
- Simplified Chinese: 何美钿
Transcriptions
Standard Mandarin
- Hanyu Pinyin: Hé Měitián
Yue: Cantonese
- Jyutping: Ho4 Mei5-tin4

He Meitian (born 2 December 1975) is a Chinese actress. She was previously a contracted artist under the Hong Kong television network TVB. After her contract with TVB ended, she returned to mainland China and continued her career with the talent agency Feiteng (飞腾).

== Filmography ==
=== Television series ===
- State of Divinity (1996)
- Journey to the West (TVB, 1996)
- Demi-Gods and Semi-Devils (1997)
- Smart Kid (2001)
- Lian Cheng Jue (2004)
- The Patriotic Knights (2006)
- Ben Xiao Hai (ATV, 2007)
- Young Hero Fong Sai Yuk (2001)
- Chess Warriors (2001)

=== Films ===
- Protégé (2007)
- Beauty Pageant (2011)
- East Meets West 2011 (2011)
- The Flight of Youth (2012)
- The Extreme Fox (2014)
