= My Hero 2 =

1993 Hong Kong film by Joe Chu

- DVD cover
- Directed by: Joe Chu
- Starring: Dicky Cheung; Ng Man Tat
- Release date: March 20, 1993
- Running time: 93 minutes
- Country: Hong Kong
- Languages: Cantonese; Mandarin

My Hero 2 (一本漫畫闖天涯2之妙想天開) is a 1993 Hong Kong comedy film directed by Joe Chu, starring Dicky Cheung and Ng Man Tat. Despite the title, it is not a sequel to the movie "My Hero (1990)", starring Stephen Chow.

== Synopsis ==
The movie is about Cheung Kin-Hong's (Dicky Cheung) ploy to get a good story involving triads for his comics. He is a comics artist and writer who has not been very successful in the past. Then one day, he encounters his hero Brother Tat (Ng Man-Tat) at his regular cafe. He manages to convince Tat, who happens to be also involved with the triads, to help him get the information he needed for his comics. How did it turn out? Did it help him to succeed?

== Cast ==
Name	Role
Dicky Cheung	Cheung Kin Hong
Ng Man-tat	Brother Tat
Vivian Lai Shui-yan	Angel
Meg Lam	Pauline, Cheung's mother
Joe Chu Kai-Sang	Gang member
Bowie Wu	Ah Sau, Angel's father
Hoh Dung	Waiter
Pak Man-Biu	Sau's buddy
Rico Chu Tak-On	Brother Hairy
William Ho Ka-Kui	Brother Siu
Lee Ho-Kwan	Brother Kwan
Lee Siu-Kei	Brother Chi
Ha Chun-Chau
Mak Hiu-Wai	Cheung's boss
Simon Lui Yue-Yeung	Cheung's colleague
Jeffrey Ho Wai-Lung	Supermarket manager
Law Shu-Kei	Senior police officer
Chan Ging-Cheung
Stephen Chow	(from "My Hero" footage)
Lam Chi-Pao
Ernest Mauser	Police officer
Victor Hon Kwan	Triad
Lui Siu-Ming	Thug
Choi Kwok-Ping	Rascal
Benny Lai Keung-Kuen	(extra / stunt)
Go Shut-Fung	(extra / stunt)
Rocky Lai Keung-Kun	(extra / stunt)
Johnny Cheung Wa	(extra / stunt)
