= The Monkey King: Quest for the Sutra =

- Promo poster
- 齊天大聖孫悟空
- Genre: Comedy; Shenmo; Fantasy
- Written by: Siu Yeuk Yuen; Chan Man keung Yip Kwong Yu
- Directed by: Fung Pak Yuen; Wong Wai Man
- Starring: Dicky Cheung; Edmond Leung; Eric Kot; Sam Lee; Charlene Choi; Gillian Chung; Nicholas Tse
- Theme music composer: Ng Kwok King
- Opening theme: "高高在下" by Dicky Cheung and Andy Lau
- Ending theme: "至情至聖" by Dicky Cheung
- Country of origin: Hong Kong
- Original language: Cantonese
- No. of episodes: 40; 35 (TVB)

Production
- Production location: Hong Kong
- Running time: 45 minutes
- Production companies: Yat Yuen Productions; Hsin Feng Company Ltd. Mo Bin International Ltd.

Original release
- Network: TVB
- Release: 10 July – 2 September 2002

The Monkey King: Quest for the Sutra (Chinese: 齊天大聖孫悟空) is a 2002 Hong Kong TV series based on the 16th-century novel Journey to the West. It is also a remake of the 1996 TVB version.

This is the second Monkey King that is portrayed by Dicky Cheung, the other one being Journey to the West (1996). It is also the first Monkey King series that is not titled Journey to the West. It was only broadcast on TVB, even though it is a Hong Kong-Taiwanese co-production.

This series consists of 40 episodes.

== Cast ==
Leading stars

- Dicky Cheung as Sun Wukong
- Edmond Leung as Tang Sanzang
- Eric Kot as Zhu Bajie
- Sam Lee as Sha Wujing
- Andy Hui as White Dragon Horse

Other stars

- Charlene Choi as Purple Orchid
- Gillian Chung as Purple Rose
- Sammi Cheng as Guan Yin
- Nicholas Tse as Chung Kwai
- William So as East Sea Dragon Emperor
- Fennie Yuen as The Snake Evil
- Kristy Yang as White Bone Demon
- Ai Iijima as Black Spider Demon
- Bryan Leung as Lee Ching
- Jimmy Lin as Ne Zha
- Alien Sun as White Spider Demon
- Yuki Hsu as Red Boy
- Anita Yuen as The Goddess of Nine Heaven
- Law Kar-ying as Golden Star
- Barbie Hsu as Ice Goddess
- Xiao Qiang as Steel Fan Princess
- Cheung Sai as SuSu
- Lee San-San as Seven Treasure Umbrella 七寶羅傘
