= Shaolin Soccer =

2001 Hong Kong film by Stephen Chow

- Theatrical release poster

Chinese name
- Traditional Chinese: 少林足球
Transcriptions
Standard Mandarin
- Hanyu Pinyin: Shàolín Zúqiú
Yue: Cantonese
- Jyutping: Siu3Lam4 Zuk1Kau4
- Directed by: Stephen Chow
- Screenplay by: Stephen Chow; Tsang Kan-cheong; Steven Fung; Andrew Fung; Lo Mei
- Produced by: Yeung Kwok-fai
- Starring: Stephen Chow; Zhao Wei; Ng Man-tat; Patrick Tse
- Cinematography: Kwan Pak-huen; Kwong Ting-wo
- Edited by: Kai Kit-wai
- Music by: Raymond Wong
- Production companies: Star Overseas; Universe Entertainment
- Distributed by: Universe Entertainment
- Release date: 12 July 2001
- Running time: 112 minutes
- Country: Hong Kong
- Languages: Cantonese; Mandarin
- Budget: $10 million
- Box office: $42.8 million

Shaolin Soccer (Chinese: 少林足球) is a 2001 Hong Kong sports comedy film directed by Stephen Chow, who also stars in the lead role. The film revolves around a former Shaolin monk who reunites his five brothers, (Note: "Brothers" here does not mean biological brothers, but "master-brothers", aka fellow disciples in martial arts under the same master. Therefore the "biggest brother" is the first one to be adopted by his mentor (the "master-father"), not necessarily the oldest one.) years after their master's death, to apply their superhuman martial arts skills to play soccer and bring Shaolin kung fu to the masses.

Shaolin Soccer received critical acclaim from critics and has grown as a cult film over the years. A spiritual successor, Kung Fu Soccer, was released in 2026.

== Plot ==
In an opening flashback scene, "Golden Leg" Fung, a Soccer star in the 1980s, misses a penalty kick in a crucial game. It transpires that he had been manipulated by his teammate Hung, who had made a large bet against his own team and offered Fung a piece of the proceeds if he missed the kick on purpose. After missing the kick, angry spectators attack Fung and break his leg.

Twenty years later, Fung walks with a limp and is the mistreated lackey of Hung, now a successful businessman. When Fung asks to coach Hung's soccer squad, Hung mocks him and reveals that he tricked him with a bad cheque and hired those who broke his leg. While drinking his sorrows in the streets, Fung comes across Sing, a Shaolin kung fu master who wants to promote the practical benefits of the martial art to the world. Nobody takes kung fu classes from Sing, however, as he is dirty and poor. He steals mantou (steamed buns) from Mui, a woman with severe acne, who uses tai chi to cook the food.

At first disdainful, Fung soon discovers the power of Sing's leg and offers to coach him in soccer. Compelled by the idea of promoting kung fu through soccer, Sing asks his former Shaolin brothers to join his team. Sing's brothers eventually agree. As a test, Fung arranges a game with a team known for their vicious cheating. The thug team gives the Shaolin team a beating. When all seems lost, the Shaolin team members reawaken their powers and utilize them to defeat the other team. The thugs ask to join Sing's team, which takes the name Team Shaolin, or Team Good in the American version of the film.

Feeling confident about this new development in his life, Sing takes Mui to try on expensive dresses at a high-end department store after hours and offers to buy her one. She gets a makeover to impress him, though the team and her boss mock her exaggerated 1980s look. When Mui hints at her feelings for Sing, he tells her he only wants to be friends. She disappears after her boss fires her.

Team Shaolin enters the open cup competition in Shanghai, where they achieve ridiculously one-sided victories due to their powers. They only meet their match in the final against Hung's Team Evil, who have superhuman strength and speed due to an American drug. The referee has also been bought out by Hung. Team Evil badly injures two of Team Shaolin's goalkeepers; the powerless members of Team Shaolin then flee. As the team is about to lose by default, Mui, who has shaved her head and overcome her acne problem, suddenly appears on the field and offers to be their goalkeeper. When Team Evil's striker kicks the ball with flaming force towards Mui, she stops it with tai chi. She and Sing combine their skills and rocket the ball downfield. The ball blows through Team Evil's goal while hurling all its players off the field, scoring the sole and winning goal.

Later, Hung is imprisoned for doping, while the Team Evil players receive lifetime bans. Sing goes out for a jog and is pleased to see people around him using kung fu in their everyday lives, his lifelong dream having become a reality. A large ad on the side of a building shows that Sing and Mui, now a famous married couple, have applied kung fu to other sports and won the world championship in bowling.

== Cast ==
- Stephen Chow as Sing / Mighty Steel Leg (#10):
  A Shaolin kung fu practitioner and former monk who wants to promote the martial arts form to the world. He is the team's striker and uses his extremely powerful legs to produce unstoppable soccer shots.
- Zhao Wei as Mui:
  A baker and Sing's love interest, who is skilled at manipulating objects with tai chi. She rarely speaks Cantonese, but everyone else still understands her and vice versa.
- Ng Man-tat as Fung / Golden Leg:
  A homeless man and former football player from the 1980s who became crippled after being beaten by an angry mob after a match, which he deliberately lost after taking a bribe from Hung, the coach of Team Evil.
  - Pu Ye Dong portrays younger Fung in the flashback.
- Patrick Tse as Hung:
  The coach of Team Evil and Fung's former teammate, who has maintained a rivalry with Fung after forcing him to take a bribe during a match in the 1980s.
  - Mingming Zhang portrays younger Hung in the flashback.
- Wong Yat-fei as Iron Head (#11):
  The eldest of the Shaolin monk brothers, who is now working in a club. His style of kung fu utilizes his immensely hard head, and he specializes in headers during matches.
- Mok Mei-lam as Hooking Leg (#2):
  The second eldest of the Shaolin monk brothers, who is now working as a dishwasher. As the team's full-back, Hooking Leg's Shaolin skills resemble ground tumbling boxing, which he uses to keep the ball away from the opponent and confuse them.
- Tin Kai-man as Iron Shirt (#3):
  The third of the Shaolin monk brothers, who is now working as a businessman. As the team's full-back, Iron Shirt can absorb blunt force attacks without injuries, as well as hold and propel the ball with his abdomen.
- Danny Chan Kwok-kwan as Empty Hand / Lightning Hand (#1):
  The fourth of the Shaolin monk brothers, who is now unemployed and job-hunting. Empty Hand resembles Bruce Lee to the point of wearing his yellow and black jumpsuit from Game of Death. As the team's goalkeeper, his fast hands and powerful arms allow him to instantly and accurately catch objects thrown at him.
- Lam Chi-chung as Light Weight Vest (#6):
  The sixth and youngest of the Shaolin monk brothers, who has become obese and gluttonous after being diagnosed with a pituitary disease. He is the team's winger. Despite his illness, he is capable of utilizing his style of kung fu to leap incredible heights, giving the illusion of flight.
- Shik Zi-yun as Team Evil's striker (#9), who can back flip and soar into the sky to kick a fiery ball to its target.
- Cao Hua as Team Evil's goalkeeper (#21), who can guard his goalpost with one hand in his pocket. His incredibly strong hands can crush a thick metal crossbar.
- Cecilia Cheung and Karen Mok as Team Dragon players #7 & #11, who can run so fast that they appear to be inches above the ground.
- Fung Min-hun as the captain of Team Rebellion, a vicious mobster who wields a crescent wrench and steel mallet as weapons.
- Vincent Kok as the captain of Team Tofu, the team that Team Shaolin faces in the preliminary match.

== Production ==
=== Inspiration ===
The inspiration for Shaolin Soccer came from Chow wanting a unique premise for a martial arts action film. According to an interview with Premiere Magazine, Chow stated,

Actually the 'over the top' CG and kinetic soccer moves were an inspiration that came from the classic Japanese manga series Captain Tsubasa. The animation was very big in Hong Kong over ten years ago when it swept kids of all ages and even adults loved it. It has a cult following in Europe as well. But it was only possible with pen and ink back then, now with the advent of CGI, it can really be done....(the idea of combining it with Kung Fu was in my head for many years but we had to wait for the CG technology to mature).

Chow had intended for this film to appeal to a global audience, stating, "I can't rely on the local market, because it's too small, so since Shaolin Soccer it's always my ambition to go international".

=== Casting ===
Apart from several veteran actors, Chow stated in an interview with Premiere magazine that he cast several people in his entourage who had no prior acting experience before Shaolin Soccer. For example, Lam Chi Chung (Light Weight) had worked as Chow's screenwriter and Danny Chan Kwok-kwan (Empty Hand) was the dance choreographer hired to design the "Michael Jackson dance number" that followed Sing and Mui's first meeting early in the film. Chow comments he made Chan wear Bruce Lee's yellow-and-black tracksuit because only the goalkeeper "can wear a special uniform." Tin Kai-man (Iron Shirt) had been Chow's production manager on several movies, but had acted in numerous minor roles in previous films. For instance, he played a young wanna-be Triad member in Chow's preceding movie, King of Comedy. Cecilia Cheung and Karen Mok, who briefly appear as Team Dragon Players 7 & 11 in Shaolin Soccer, had major roles in King of Comedy. Chow defended his decision to hire non-actors, saying, "In terms of finding talent, I try to bring out the funniest thing I notice about them during casting, if it made us laugh at the casting, it will also do on the big screen."

Three of the principal cast members later appeared in Chow's Kung Fu Hustle: Danny Chan Kwok-kwan (Empty Hand) portrayed Brother Sum, boss of the "Axe Gang"; Tin Kai-man (Iron Shirt) portrayed the loud-mouthed advisor of Brother Sum; and Lam Chi-chung (Light Weight) portrayed Bone, Chow's sidekick and partner in petty crime. Fung Min-hun (Team Rebellion Captain) briefly appeared as Cecilia Cheung's abusive boyfriend in King of Comedy and the Four Eyes Clerk who beats up Sing and Bone when they make fun of him on the bus in Kung Fu Hustle. According to Zhao Wei, she was cast as Mui after Chow saw her performance in the television show My Fair Princess.

== Release ==
The film had special screening in the NYAFF 25th Anniversary Rediscoveries section of the 25th New York Asian Film Festival on 17 July 2026 as part of the 25th anniversary of the festival.

=== United States release ===
Following the film's success in Asia, Miramax Films acquired the United States distribution rights. The company subsequently delayed the release for approximately two years while preparing several altered versions, including an English-dubbed edition with additional editing and music changes.

The film eventually received a limited United States theatrical release in April 2004 in a shortened subtitled version. Chow later said that he did not resent Miramax's changes, but regarded the delayed and altered release as a learning experience in distributing his films internationally.

=== Home media ===
In Hong Kong, the film was released on DVD and Video CD on 14 September 2001. The DVD release was shortened by 10 minutes, with the option for viewers to access the deleted scenes in the middle of the film. The scenes deleted from the DVD version are the dance sequence in front of Mui's bakery, much of the conversation over Mui's makeover and the blooper reel before the end credits. Viewers can also access the making of key special effects scenes as well.

The film was also released in UMD format for the Sony PSP on 23 December 2005. The Japanese version of the film was released by Pioneer LDC on 22 November 2002. It was reissued by The Clockworks Group on 21 December 2003.

The 2004 US DVD release by Miramax Films deleted 23 minutes of footage from the original cut; the omitted footage includes "Golden Leg" Fung's flashback opening sequence and Sing's interactions with Mui. This version features an English dub with Chow dubbing his own voice and Bai Ling as the voice of Mui. In addition, the DVD gives viewers the option to play the original Hong Kong version. In April 2020, ViacomCBS (now known as Paramount Skydance) acquired the rights to Miramax's film library after buying a 49% stake in the studio from Qatari company beIN Media Group. They later made the film available on their subscription streaming service Paramount+, and on their free streaming service Pluto TV. In July 2021, Paramount Home Entertainment reissued it on DVD in the United States, in addition to issuing it on Blu-ray in Japan.

In the UK, the film was released on Blu-ray by Optimum Releasing on 26 January 2010. The Italian dub of the film features the voices of professional footballers Damiano Tommasi (as Mighty Steel Leg Sing), Vincent Candela (as Empty Hand), Marco Delvecchio (as Iron Head), Siniša Mihajlović (as Hooking Leg), Giuseppe Pancaro (as Iron Shirt) and Angelo Peruzzi (as Light Weight Vest).

== Reception ==
=== Box office ===
Shaolin Soccer was a major commercial success in Hong Kong. It grossed HK$60,739,847, becoming the highest-grossing film in the territory's history at the time and the highest-grossing film in Hong Kong during 2001. The record was later surpassed by Chow's Kung Fu Hustle in 2004. Contemporary industry coverage described Shaolin Soccer as Hong Kong's highest-grossing local production to that point.

The film also performed strongly internationally. Japan was its largest overseas market, where it grossed approximately $20.4 million, compared with $7.4 million in Hong Kong, $4.36 million in South Korea and $3.25 million in France. Its worldwide gross was approximately $42.8 million.

=== Critical response ===
On Rotten Tomatoes, the film has an 89% approval rating based on 95 reviews; the average rating is 7.10/10. The site's critical consensus reads: "The plot is utterly ridiculous, and the soccer in the movie is unlike any ever played anywhere on Earth, but watching Shaolin Soccer, you will probably find it impossible to care." On Metacritic, the film has a score of 68 out of 100 based on 24 critics, indicating "generally favorable reviews".

=== Mainland China ban ===
In 2001, Chow clashed with the movie bureau of the State Administration of Radio, Film and Television (SARFT) during the examination of Shaolin Soccer. Shaolin Temple complained about putting "soccer" alongside "Shaolin", which they worried would insult Buddhists. Chow refused to change the title to "Kung Fu Soccer", and the film's producer was banned from shooting on the mainland for one year. According to Wong Jing, the film's release ban was largely due to Chow's refusal to alter its title, as the term “Shaolin” had been commercially registered by the Shaolin Temple and could not be used without approval. Wong claimed that although Universe Entertainment proposed alternatives such as "Kung Fu Soccer", Chow rejected the change and declined to meet temple representatives, which Wong alleged led to the film's near loss-making performance and circulation mainly through pirated copies in mainland China.

== Accolades ==
Awards & Nominations
Award	Category	Nominee	Result	Ref.
Blue Ribbon Awards	Best Foreign Language Film		Won	
2nd Chinese Film Media Awards	Best Film		Nominated	
2nd Chinese Film Media Awards	Best Actor	Stephen Chow	Nominated	
2nd Chinese Film Media Awards	Best Actress	Zhao Wei	Nominated	
38th Golden Horse Awards	Best Action Choreography	Ching Siu-tung	Won	
38th Golden Horse Awards	Best Visual Effects	Centro Digital Pictures Ltd.	Won	
7th Golden Bauhinia Awards	Best Picture		Won	
7th Golden Bauhinia Awards	Best Director	Stephen Chow	Won	
7th Golden Bauhinia Awards	Best Supporting Actor	Wong Yat-fei	Won	
21st Hong Kong Film Awards	Best Picture		Won	
21st Hong Kong Film Awards	Best Director	Stephen Chow	Won	
21st Hong Kong Film Awards	Best Young Director	Stephen Chow	Won	
21st Hong Kong Film Awards	Best Screenplay	Stephen Chow; Tsang Kan-cheung	Nominated	
21st Hong Kong Film Awards	Best Actor	Stephen Chow	Won	
21st Hong Kong Film Awards	Best Supporting Actor	Wong Yat-fei	Won	
21st Hong Kong Film Awards	Best Action Choreography	Ching Siu-tung	Nominated	
21st Hong Kong Film Awards	Best Cinematography	Kwan Pak-suen; Kwong Ting-wo	Nominated	
21st Hong Kong Film Awards	Best Costume & Make Up Design	Choi Yim-man	Nominated	
21st Hong Kong Film Awards	Best Editing	Hai Kit-Wai	Nominated	
21st Hong Kong Film Awards	Best Sound Effect	Kinson Tsang	Won	
21st Hong Kong Film Awards	Best Visual Effect	Frankie Chung; Ken Law; Ronald To	Won	
21st Hong Kong Film Awards	Best Original Film Score	Raymond Wong	Nominated	
21st Hong Kong Film Awards	Best Original Film Song	Kick to the Future (song); Jacky Chan (composer); Andy Lau (lyricist/performer)	Nominated	
Hong Kong Film Critics Society Awards	Best Picture		Won	

== Media adaptations ==
=== Comic books ===
==== Chinese ====
The first of a four volume Shaolin Soccer manhua was published in Hong Kong roughly nine months after the film originally premiered in 2001. The characters were drawn with large manga-like eyes and cartoonish bodies, but the artists were careful to retain the likenesses of each actor who portrayed them.

==== American ====
ComicsOne approached noted comic book artist Andy Seto with the idea of creating a two volume manhua-style graphic novel adaptation of the feature film. Seto attached himself to the project because the film was very popular and, therefore, had "a certain level of marketing value". The project was officially announced on 30 June 2003 and the release of vol. 1 was scheduled to coincide with the film's US premiere in August, but the film was pushed back. The Miramax film corporation bought the American film rights to Shaolin Soccer before its release in China, so they helped publish the comic book along with two Chinese film companies who originally produced the film. Volumes 1 (ISBN 1-58899-318-3) and 2 (ISBN 1-58899-319-1) were released in August and November 2003 and sold for US$13.95 each. Their suggested reading level was age 13 and above.

Seto worked to make the novel as faithful to the film as possible but he admits that Stephen Chow's brand of Mo lei tau comedy does not translate well into illustrations. He stated in an interview that "the Shaolin Soccer comic is 80% movie adaptation with 20% new content." This new content includes a backstory about Steel Leg's training in Shaolin before the death of his master, as well as completely rewriting entire sections of the movie. For example, in the film a group of bar thugs beat up Sing and Iron Head after listening to their lounge-style tribute to Shaolin kung fu. The following day, Sing seeks out the group and uses his Shaolin skills to beat the thugs using a football. Fung sees the brawl and comes up with the idea of fusing kung fu and football. However, in the comic book, Sing is meditating in the park when he gets hit in the head with a football. The cocky players mock him and destroy a stone statue of his deceased master. Sing proceeds to use the football as a weapon.

Another example is the fact the characters are visually different from the film. All of their comic book personas look to be in their twenties to thirties, with highly toned athletic physiques (with the exception of Light Weight); even Iron Head, who was the eldest of the six brothers, appears younger than he should.

Several online reviews have criticised the American adaptation for its apparent lack of story line coherence, mixture of realistic and cartoonish drawing styles, and bad Chinese-to-English translation, among other issues. In regards to the translation, one reviewer stated, "It's almost as if the book was translated with a first-year English student referencing a Chinese-to-English dictionary, with strangely assembled sentences and strange bursts of dialogue peppering the pages." Another common complaint was that the comics seemed to be geared towards those people who had previously seen the movie. Without this familiarity, a newcomer would lose track of the storyline because of the overcrowded pages and rapidly shifting plot.

== Legacy ==
- Stephen Chow produced Shaolin Girl, a Japanese film inspired by Shaolin Soccer.
- Michael Dante DiMartino and Bryan Konietzko, co-creators of the Avatar: The Last Airbender animated television series, stated in an interview that "Shaolin Soccer is one of our favorite movies. It has tons of fantastic action and lots of funny moments. Some of the effects provided inspiration for how bending (the art of controlling the elements) might look on the show."
- It was referenced in the PlayStation videogame Super Shot Soccer, released by Tecmo in 2002. This is shown in one of the unlockable teams, which appears as "Hong Kong". The uniform is exactly the same as the one in Sing's team, the power-ups the team use are consistent with the ones they use throughout the movie, and the entire cast is referenced in the names of the players (For example, the lead striker is named "Stephen C." to reference Sing).
- One episode of Keroro Gunso had a football theme which parodied this movie.
- The music video for the American R&B singer-songwriter and rapper Lumidee's song "Dance" launched and the 2006 FIFA World Cup album soundtrack has scenes of the movie.
- A clip of Shaolin Soccer was played on the big screen of the venue before the match Ivory Coast vs Serbia and Montenegro in the 2006 FIFA World Cup.
- Edgar Wright named the film as one of the influences on his Scott Pilgrim vs. the World.
- Eiichiro Oda, creator of the manga One Piece, reconsidered his opposition to a live-action adaptation after watching Shaolin Soccer, which convinced him it was feasible. He subsequently took an active role in overseeing the live-action television adaptation for Netflix.

== Sequel ==
In June 2023, Stephen Chow took to social media to announce the completion of the script for his latest cinematic venture, titled Shaolin Women's Soccer.

A standalone sequel, Kung Fu Soccer, was released in July 2026 in China. Co-written and directed by Stephen Chow, the film follows the journey of a fictional Chinese women's soccer team called "Emei" as they compete in a soccer tournament.

== See also ==
- Four Oddballs of Saigon
- List of association football films
