= Kung Fu Soccer (TV series) =

2004 Hong Kong TV drama series

- 功夫足球
- Genre: Modern drama
- Directed by: Ho Wai Chan; Sin Ming Ko; Ping Kwong Lee; Man Kit Poon
- Starring: Dicky Cheung; Anthony Wong; Bowie Lam; Sandra Ng; Gillian Chung (Guest Star); Charlene Choi (Guest Star)
- Opening theme: "足球小將" by Dicky Cheung
- Ending theme: "貪慕虛榮" by Joey Yung
- Countries of origin: Hong Kong; China
- Original language: Cantonese
- No. of episodes: 33

Production
- Running time: 45 minutes (approx.)
- Production company: Ting Yut Siu

Original release
- Network: TVB
- Release: December 6, 2004 – January 9, 2005

Kung Fu Soccer (Chinese: 功夫足球) is a Hong Kong television drama series that aired on TVB from December 6, 2004 to January 9, 2005.

== Plot ==
Kung Fu Soccer is about the soccer world intertwined with talented people from the world of Kung Fu. Each character has a special Kung Fu talent that they use to play soccer.

Lam Chung Fu (Anthony Wong) was once a great soccer player in China. While at the top of his soccer-playing career, his brother Pau set him up and he was forced to give up playing.

One day, Fu meets a young man named Shun/Little Sun (Dicky Cheung) and is impressed by his kung-fu and soccer skills. Shun has a disease that causes him to have a really bad memory and he can not remember people. The only thing he can remember is everything relating to soccer (for example soccer players, soccer teams and soccer matches).

Fu comes up with the idea to form a Kung Fu soccer team and apply martial arts skills to the game of soccer. They lose their first game 16–2, however after training hard, the team becomes better and soon wins most of its games.

Then Shun meets a traditional Chinese doctor who has a new medication that can help him. However this new medication has a huge risk—if it goes wrong the medication can kill him. Shun's sister (Sandra Ng), who also has many kung fu skills, gives Shun the choice and he chooses to take the new medication. Shun survives, his memory becomes normal and he is soon elected as captain of the team.

The story continues with the team winning many matches and having many sponsors. Near the end, Lam Chung Fu's brother, the evil Lam Chung Pau, wants their team to lose, so he creates another Kung Fu soccer team to compete against them.

Pau has many evil people working for him and even kills two people from Fu's soccer team (a goalkeeper who tried to save his teammates while they were trapped in a building by Pau and a defence player who tried to save another player from his team by donating his kidney because one of Pau's players kicked one of Fu's players during a soccer match). The defence player was unlucky and dies after the operation but the player who he tried to save survives.

At last with Lam Chung Fu's and the other players' training, the players succeed in defeating Pau's team and become world famous.

== Cast ==
- Dicky Cheung
- Anthony Wong
- Sandra Ng
- Bowie Lam
- Joey Yung
- Rain Li
- Lam Hiu Fung
- Gillian Chung
- Charlene Choi
- Gallen Lo (guest star)
