= Ng Man-tat =

Hong Kong actor (1952–2021)

- 吳孟達
- Born: Ng Man-tat; 2 January 1952; Xiamen, Fujian, China
- Died: 27 February 2021 (aged 69); Tai Wai, Hong Kong
- Occupation: Actor
- Years active: 1973–2021
- Awards: Hong Kong Film Awards – Best Supporting Actor; 1990 A Moment of Romance

Chinese name
- Traditional Chinese: 吳孟達
- Simplified Chinese: 吴孟达
Transcriptions
Standard Mandarin
- Hanyu Pinyin: Wú Mèngdá
Yue: Cantonese
- Jyutping: Ng4 Maang6-daat6
- IPA: [ŋ maŋ˨.tat̚˨]
Southern Min
- Hokkien POJ: Ngô͘ Bēng-ta̍t

Richard Ng Man-tat (Chinese: 吳孟達, 2 January 1952 – 27 February 2021), commonly called Uncle Tat (達叔), was a Hong Kong actor originally from Fujian. He was a veteran with dozens of awards in the Hong Kong film industry, including Best Supporting Actor at the 10th Hong Kong Film Awards for his role in A Moment of Romance. Ng was best known for his comedic roles alongside Stephen Chow and was a versatile actor with many memorable performances throughout his career.

== Early life ==
Richard Ng Man-tat was born on Gulangyu island in Xiamen, Fujian, on 2 January 1952. He had an older sister and two younger brothers. As such, his mother tongue was actually Hokkien, but his younger brothers cannot speak it at all. Ng's family migrated to Hong Kong when he was five. The family relied on his father's monthly income of HK$500 to survive. Ng studied at Aberdeen Technical School, where he taught a mechanical course to help provide for the family.

== Career ==
=== Early acting career and bankruptcy ===
Ng noticed TVB's Chinese Folklore, which had an actor, Lin Wei Tu (林偉圖), who was Ng's coworker at the factory where he was working. Ng thought he met the requirements of being an actor and signed up for TVB's acting classes in 1973. In 1974, he graduated fifth in his batch of trainees, alongside veteran actor Chow Yun-fat, and debuted when he was 22. He was one of the seven from his batch to sign an acting contract with TVB.

Ng's breakout film was the 1979 edition of the television series Chor Lau-heung in which he played Wu Tit-fa. This role allowed him to become one of the more sought-after actors of that time. However, he became caught up in the fame and fortune that he gained, and starting gambling. By 1980, he owed HK$300,000 to loan sharks and was declared bankrupt. TVB then minimised his appearances. Ng wanted to borrow money from his friends, including Chow, but he was turned away by them, and then considered suicide as a possible recourse. After some consideration, Ng decided to restudy and improve his acting skills, reading up on Konstantin Stanislavski's An Actor Prepares and Zheng Junli's The Birth of a Role (角色的誕生). To pay off his debts, two-thirds of Ng's salary was used for repayments. While repaying his debts, Ng was cast in 1981's Heroic Cops, in which his efforts were recognised, thus enabling him to continue acting in films and television series. The debts were paid off by 1984.

=== Acting career resurgence ===
In 1985, Ng acted in the television series Police Cadet '84 which was well-received by local television audiences, and allowed his peers in the industry to re-evaluate him in a positive manner. He began to receive new work at a more consistent rate. In 1988, Ng began to co-star with Stephen Chow with their first TVB television series together, The Final Combat, and also the popular 1990 film All for the Winner, where he played the role of Chow's uncle. From then on, the two collaborated in numerous "mo lei tau" films in the same style as All for the Winner. He was best known for co-starring with Chow in comedy films that broke Hong Kong box office charts in the 1990s.

Through 1991, Ng carried a grudge against Chow Yun-fat for not lending him money. When Ng won the Best Supporting Actor award at the 10th Hong Kong Film Awards for A Moment of Romance, he openly snubbed Chow. Benny Chan, the director of A Moment of Romance, then revealed to Ng that it was on Chow's recommendation that Ng had gotten the role for the film. Chow also had similarly assisted him to get the role for Heroic Cops. Chow said that he didn't want to lend money to him as he feared that it would turn into a form of reliance, making it harder for Ng to recover from his gambling habit. Both Ng and Chow reconciled thereafter.

Although Ng owed much of his popularity to co-starring in comedy films, he showed himself to be a versatile actor in successfully portraying various roles. An example of such was in his portrayal of Sister 13's father in Portland Street Blues, where he played a man who could not feel anything but abuse and rejection. It proved to be the perfect complement to his usual "mo lei tau" style with Chow. He also played Andy Lau's sidekick in the Lee Rock series in a more serious role, which won him Best Supporting Actor at the 10th Hong Kong Film Awards. In Hong Kong, Ng was often known as "Uncle Tat", a nickname most likely derived from his role as Stephen Chow's sidekick (often as his uncle) in their films. Ng was sometimes credited as Richard Ng.

In 2001, Ng and Stephen Chow collaborated for the last time in Shaolin Soccer. In 2006 Ng starred in the Taiwanese drama The Hospital as Tang Guotai (唐國泰), a professor and director of surgery. He was subsequently nominated for Best Supporting Actor at the 42nd Golden Bell Awards in 2007.

In 2019, Ng starred in the science fiction film The Wandering Earth, in which he played the grandfather of the male lead. Ng nearly rejected the role as he believed that the Chinese film industry was not fit to make science fiction movies, and he had to undergo heart surgery at the time. During the filming, he had to bear the weight of a 35 kilograms (77 lb) spacesuit while still recovering from his heart failure in 2014.

== Personal life ==
Ng married Mak Lee Lee, a Hong Kong artist, in 1976. They met during a TVB training class. Mak gave birth to twin daughters. After Ng's gambling debts had risen to HK$300,000, Mak filed for a divorce which was granted in 1994. While Ng and Mak were still married, Ng cohabited with Lo Siu Chi (卢少慈), also a Hong Kong artist, and had a daughter together. In 1993, while Ng was filming All's Well, Ends Well Too in Singapore, he met Hou Shanyan (侯珊燕), a Malaysian beauty pageant runner-up and artist. Ng married Hou in 1996, and they had a daughter and son. He lived with his family in Johor Bahru, Malaysia, until shortly before his death, when he asked to spend time in Hong Kong.

Being a native of Xiamen, he was fluent in Hokkien. He was reported to be speaking Hokkien with the cast when he was filming in Taiwan.

== Illness and death ==
Ng was admitted to the hospital in 2014 for heart failure due to a viral infection. After this incident, Ng had a will drawn up, and remained in poor health from that point. In February 2021, he confirmed that he suffered from liver cancer and had been undergoing chemotherapy followed by rest and recuperation, but his condition had turned critical.

At 17:17 on 27 February 2021, Ng died in his sleep at Tai Wai's Union Hospital at the age of 69.

== Filmography ==
=== Film ===
- Hong Kong Emmanuelle (香港艾曼妞) (1977)
- Heaven Sword and Dragon Sabre (1978)
- Heroic Cops (1981)
- Everlasting Love (1984)
- Crazy Games (瘋狂遊戲) (1985)
- Working Class (1985)
- Smile Again (花女情狂) (1985)
- Seven Angels (1985)
- Legacy of Rage (1986)
- To Err is Humane (標錯參) (1987)
- A Better Tomorrow 2 (1987)
- Tiger Cage (1988)
- Operation Pink Squad (1988)
- Blood Ritual (血裸祭) (1989)
- All About Ah-Long (1989)
- Chinese Cop Out (省港雙龍)(1989)
- Killing Angels (1989)
- God of Gamblers (1989)
- Satanic Crystals (奪寶龍虎鬥) (1989)
- A Fiery Family (龍虎家族) (1989)
- My Heart Is That Eternal Rose (1989)
- A Moment of Romance (1990)
- Triad Story (1990)
- Blood Stained Tradewinds (1990)
- Hong Kong Gigolo (1990)
- That's Money (越軌行動) (1990)
- Story of My Son (1990)
- Gangland Odyssey (1990)
- God of Gamblers II (1990)
- All for the Winner (1990)
- Lung Fung Restaurant (1990)
- Royal Scoundrel (1991)
- Queen of Underworld (夜生活女王霞姐傳奇) (1991)
- Her Fatal Ways (1991)
- Mainland Dundee (表哥我來也) (1991)
- To Catch a Thief (1991)
- Fight Back to School (1991)
- Son on the Run (帶子洪郎) (1991)
- To Be Number One (1991)
- Fist of Fury 1991 (1991)
- Lee Rock (1991)
- Lee Rock II (1991)
- Dances with Dragon (1991)
- The Banquet (1991) – cameo
- God of Gamblers III: Back to Shanghai (1991)
- Top Bet (1991)
- Money Maker (1991)
- Tricky Brains (1991)
- Angel Hunter (女校風雲之邪教入侵) (1992)
- Shogun and Little Kitchen (1992)
- The Night Rider (1992)
- With or Without You (1992)
- King of Beggars (1992)
- It's Now Or Never (1992)
- Best of the Best (1992)
- True Love (真的愛妳) (1992)
- To Miss With Love (1992)
- Fight Back To School II (1992)
- Truant Heroes (1992)
- Royal Tramp (1992)
- Handsome Siblings (1992)
- Once Upon a Time a Hero in China (黃飛鴻笑傳) (1992)
- Justice, My Foot (1992)
- The Prince of Temple Street (1992)
- Gameboy Kids (1992)
- Man Of The Times (一代梟雄之三支旗) (1993)
- My Hero II (1993)
- Millionaire Cop (1993)
- Laughter of "Water Margins" (1993)
- Holy Weapon (1993)
- Taxi Hunter (1993)
- Chez N'Ham Story (1993)
- All's Well End's Well, Too (1993)
- Flying Dagger (1993)
- The Eight Hilarious Gods (1993)
- Angel Of The Road (馬路天使) (1993)
- Even Mountains Meet (情天霹靂之下集大結局) (1993)
- End of the Road (1993)
- Master Wong VS Master Wong (黃飛鴻對黃飛鴻) (1993)
- The Sword Stained with Royal Blood (1993)
- The Mad Monk (1993)
- Heroes Among Heroes (1993)
- The Kung Fu Scholar (1994)
- Love on Delivery (1994)
- Hail the Judge (1994)
- Love and the City (1994)
- Shaolin Popey II Messy Temple (1994)
- Lantern (燈籠) (1994)
- A Chinese Odyssey Part One - Pandora's Box (1995)
- A Chinese Odyssey Part Two - Cinderella (1995)
- China Dragon (1995)
- Teenage Master (小飛俠) (1995)
- Trouble Maker (1995)
- Saint of Gamblers (1995)
- Super Mischieves (無敵反斗星) (1995)
- Armed Policewoman (1995)
- Sixty Million Dollar Man (1995)
- Killer has No Return (殺手三分半鐘) (1996)
- On Fire (玩火) (1996)
- Adventurous Treasure Island (黃金島歷險記) (1996)
- God of Cookery (1996)
- The King of Comic (顽皮炸弹) (1996)
- Jail in Burning Island (火燒島之橫行霸道) (1997)
- Happy Together (1997)
- Chinese Midnight Express (1997)
- Ninja Kids (1997)
- The Lucky Guy (1998)
- Portland Street Blues (1998)
- King of Comedy (1999)
- Lord of Amusement (1999)
- The Marvellous Cook (真味小和尚) (2000)
- Everyday is Valentine (2001)
- Shaolin Soccer (2001)
- Market's Romance (2002)
- One Stone and Two Birds (2005)
- Kung Fu Dunk (2008)
- The Musician (少年星海) (2010)
- Big Big Man (2011)
- Choy Lee Fut Kung Fu (蔡李佛拳) (2011)
- To My Wife (與妻書) (2012)
- Blockbuster (大片) (2013)
- Kara King (2013)
- Aberdeen (2014)
- Overheard 3 (2014)
- Time Is Money (2015)
- Dealer/Healer (2017)
- Oolong Courtyard: KungFu School (2018)
- The Duke of Royal Tramp (一品爵爷) (2019)
- The Wandering Earth (2019)
- The Country of the Demon (万妖国) (2019)
- The Real vs. Fake Monkey King (2020)
- Kill the Monster (2021)
- The Legend of Shaolin Temple (2021)

=== Television ===
- God of River Lok (1975)
- The Legend of the Book and the Sword (1976)
- The Romantic Swordsman (1978)
- Chor Lau-heung (1979)
- Police Cadet '84 (1984)
- The Duke of Mount Deer (1984)
- Police Cadet '85 (1985)
- Sword Stained with Royal Blood (1985)
- The Battlefield (1985)
- Heir to the Throne Is... (1986)
- The Legend of the Book and the Sword (1987)
- The Final Combat (1989)
- The Justice of Life (1989)
- The Witty Attorney (1999)
- The Duke of Mount Deer (2000)
- The New Adventures of Chor Lau Heung (2001)
- Drunken Kung Fu (醉无敌) (2002)
- Money No Problem (恭喜发财) (2004)
- The Hospital (2006)
- Love Strategy (2008)
- OCTB (2017)
