= Li Tieguai =

One of the Eight Taoist Immortals

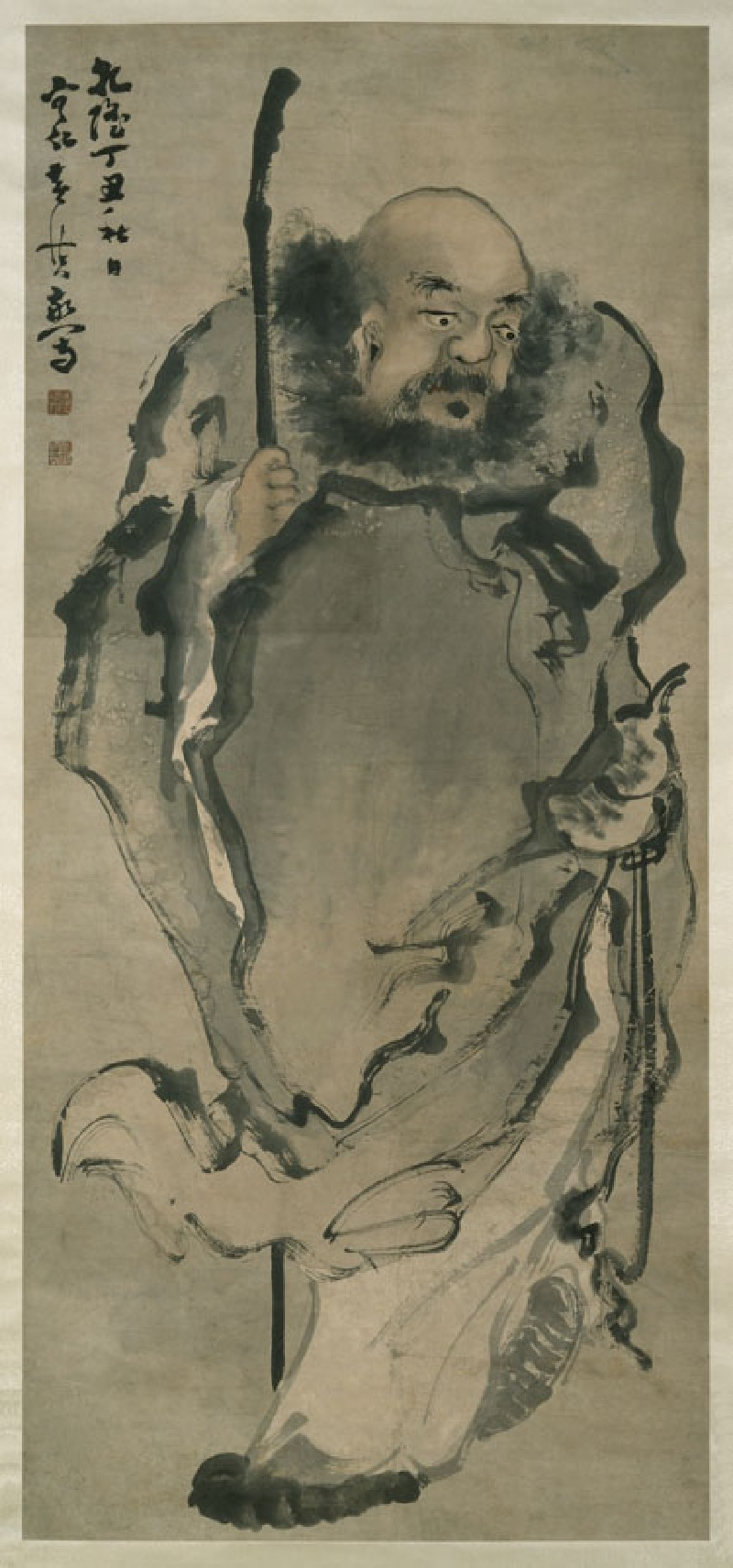
- The hermit Li Tieguai by Huang Shen, 1757
- Traditional Chinese: 李鐵拐
- Simplified Chinese: 李铁拐
Transcriptions
Standard Mandarin
- Hanyu Pinyin: Lǐ Tiěguǎi
- Wade–Giles: Li^{3} T'ieh^{3}-kuai^{3}
- IPA: [lì tʰjè.kwàɪ]
Yue: Cantonese
- Yale Romanization: Léih Tit-gwáai
- Jyutping: Lei5 Tit3-gwaai2
- IPA: [lej˩˧ tʰit̚˧ kʷaj˧˥]
Southern Min
- Hokkien POJ: Lí Thiat-koái

Li Tieguai (Chinese: 李鐵拐; lit. 'Iron Crutch Li') is a figure in Chinese folklore and one of the Eight Immortals in the Taoist pantheon. He is sometimes described as irascible and ill-tempered, but also benevolent to the poor, sick and the needy, whose suffering he alleviates with special medicine from his bottle gourd. He is often portrayed as an ugly old man with a dirty face, a scraggly beard, and messy hair held by a golden band. He walks with the aid of an iron crutch and often has a gourd slung over his shoulder or held in his hand. He often is depicted as a clown figure who descends to earth in the form of a beggar who uses his power to fight for the oppressed and needy, and to heal others.

The legend says that Li was born in the Yuan dynasty (1279–1368), and was originally named "Li Xuan". However, in folklore, he is depicted as Laozi's apprentice, hence he should have lived in the sixth century BC.

== Apotheosis ==
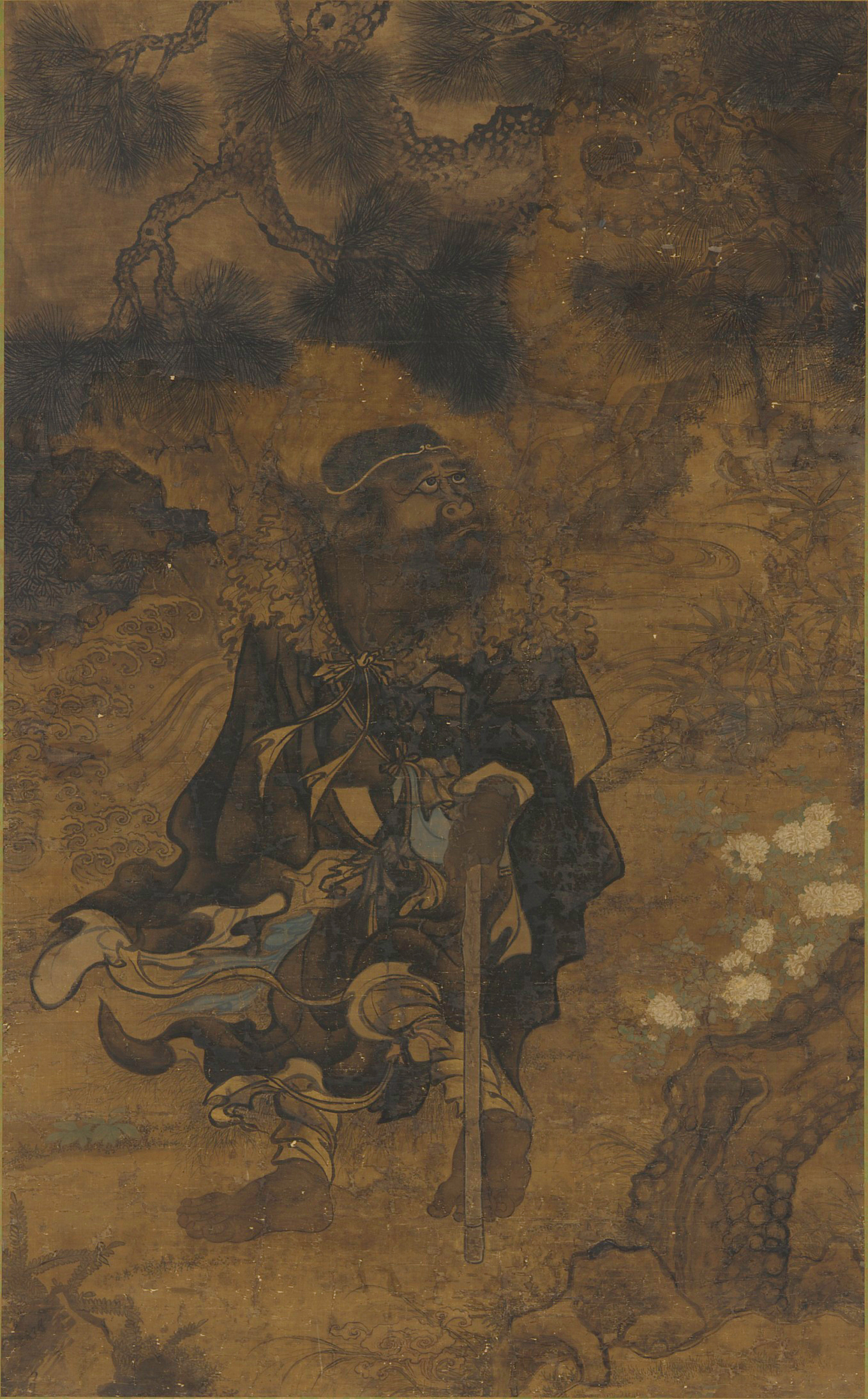
Li Tieguai under a Pine, ca. 1500

The Eight Immortals became immortals by means of practising Taoist magical arts. According to the myth, they lived on an island paradise, Mount Penglai in eastern China, which only they could traverse due to the "weak water" which would not support ships. Among the Eight Immortals, Li Tieguai was one of the more popular, and was depicted as a man leaning on a crutch and holding a calabash gourd. Some say that in the myth the "gourd had spirals of smoke ascend from it, denoting his power of setting his spirit free from his body." Others say that the gourd was full of medicine which he dispensed to the poor and needy.

Li studied with Laozi. He is said to have renounced material comforts and led a life of self-discipline as an act of religious devotion for 40 years, often going without food or sleep.

Li lived in a cave in the early stage of his Taoist training. Laozi tempted him with a beautiful woman he had made of wood. After refusing to acknowledge the presence of this woman and therefore defeating his temptation, Laozi told him of his trick and rewarded him with a small white tablet. After consuming this tablet, Li was never hungry nor ill. Laozi tempted Li again with money. Some robbers had buried money in Li's field without knowing he was watching. Laozi approached him in disguise and told him he should take any money that came to him. After Li refused, saying that he did not care if he remained poor his whole life, Laozi rewarded him with another pill. This pill bestowed upon Li the ability to fly at amazing speeds.

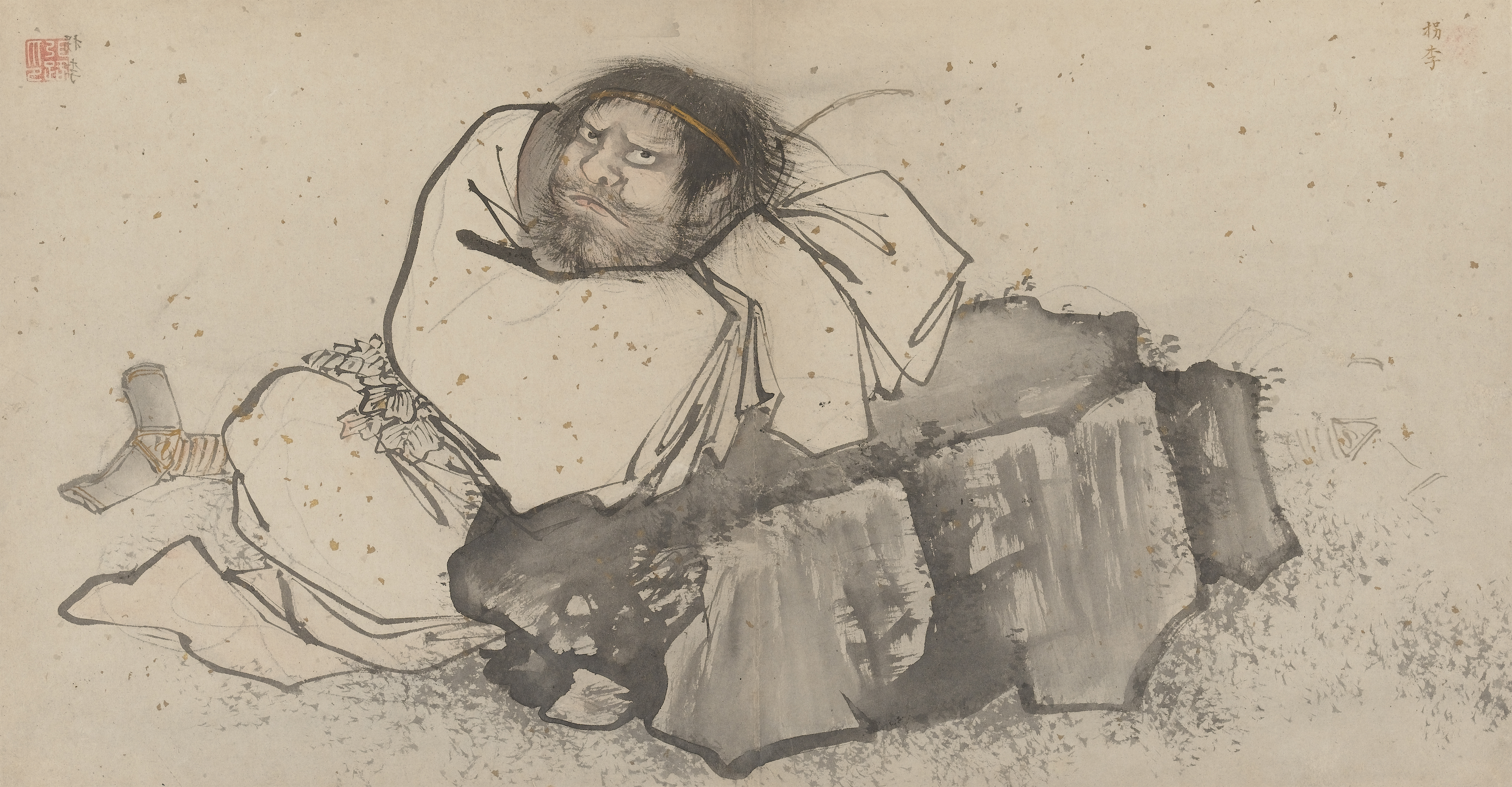
The Daoist Immortal Li Tieguai by Zhang Lu, early 16th century

Before becoming an immortal, it was previously stated that Li was a very handsome man. However, on one occasion, his spirit travelled to Heaven to meet other immortals. He had told his apprentice, Li Qing, to wait for seven days for his spirit to return. If he did not return by then, Li Qing was to burn the body because that meant that he had become an immortal; but after six and a half days Li Qing had to go home to see to his sick mother one last time before she died. Li Qing thus cremated Li Tieguai's body. He passed by a dying beggar on his way to his mother's but did not have time to bury him. Upon returning, Li Tieguai's spirit found that his body had been cremated and had to enter the only body available at the time, the corpse of the homeless beggar who had just died of starvation. The beggar, unfortunately, had a long and pointed head, large ears with one large brass earring, a woolly and dishevelled beard and hair. He also had long, scraggly, and dark eyebrows, dark eyes, and he had a pan lid on his head and a lame leg. Laozi appeared and gave him a medicine gourd that could cure any illness and never emptied. Li then brought his apprentice's mother back to life using the liquid from his gourd. Li Qing was then dismissed as his apprentice, after being given a small pill and being told that he would work hard enough to become an immortal himself. This turned out to be true.

"The gourd served as a bedroom for the night and held medicine, which Li dispensed with great beneficence to the poor and needy." Laozi also used the bottle to make him an iron crutch that would never rust nor break. He then told Li that he was ready to join the immortals. From then on, Li was tasked with curing the sick and he travelled to many lands and "could be found wherever the sick lay dying or the poor were persecuted."

== Religious influence ==
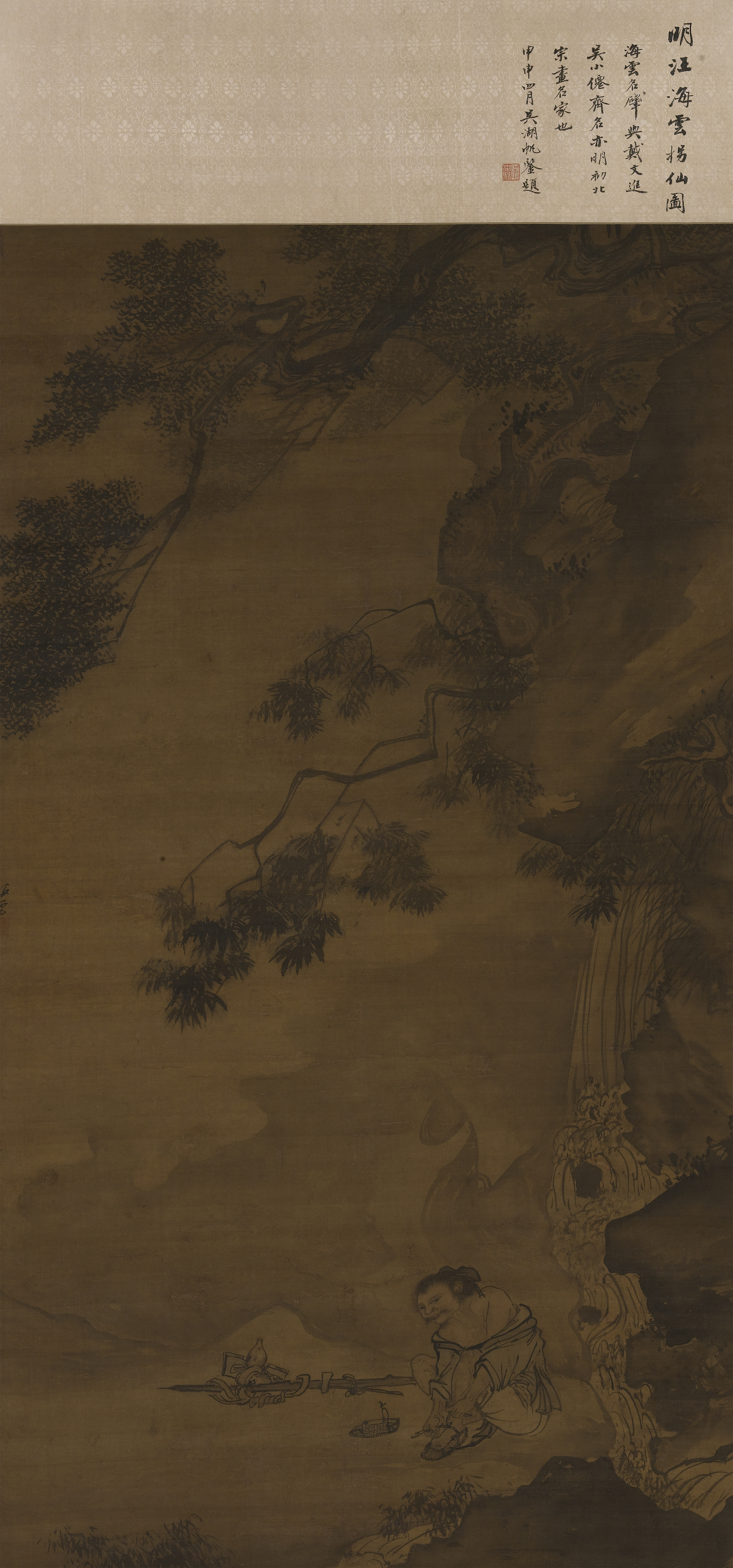
Iron-crutch Li by Wang Zhao, 16th century

Probably the second most popular of the Eight Immortals, Li is associated with medicine. His symbol of an iron crutch still hangs outside some traditional apothecaries. One of the reasons for him not being extremely popular is due to his "renowned bad temper and eccentricities." Sometimes, the non devout seek out prescriptions from him through certain Taoist priests. His magical, medical gourd is his more popular sign which is favoured by professional exorcists. As a beggar, he uses his form to "fight for the rights of the poor and those in need." "He is...a clown figure and his popularity rests upon the twin attractions of being seen as one of the downtrodden, who is really more powerful than the strongest, and the clown who is irascible."

The Eight Immortals are examples of how all can obtain immortality. Most of the immortals (including Li) were common folk who attracted the attention of the gods through suffering unjust treatment, without complaint, and gave more to others than themselves. They were admitted to eternal life as a reward for their acts on earth and bearing gifts to the Old Man of the South Pole, the god of longevity. "The path to immortality includes achieving physical and spiritual harmony through meditation, diet, exercise, breath control, and the use of herbs. To achieve this state, one also had to eliminate all disease and evil from the body and spirit".

He was thought to make medicine "that could revive the dead."

== Iconography ==
His characteristic emblems are the calabash gourd-bottle, which identifies him as one of the Eight Immortals, and his signature iron-crutch (which is now used as the symbol for Traditional Chinese medicine and such apothecaries, similar to the use of the Rod of Asclepius for modern medicine).

A vapour cloud emanates from the gourd, and within it is the sage's hun (soul); which may be depicted as a formless shape or as a miniature double of his bodily-self.

== Modern depictions ==
In the television show Jackie Chan Adventures, Li was shown to be the Immortal who sealed away Bai Tza, The Water Demon.

== See also ==
Media related to Li Tie Guai at Wikimedia Commons

- Asclepius
  - Rod of Asclepius
