= Diasporama: Dead Air =

- Screenshot, the subtitle reads "I don't think 1997 is a time limit."
- 另起爐灶之耳仔痛
- Directed by: Yau Ching
- Produced by: Yau Ching
- Cinematography: Yau Ching
- Edited by: Yau Ching
- Release date: 4 June 1997 (Hong Kong)
- Running time: 89 minutes
- Language: Cantonese

Diasporama: Dead Air (Chinese: 另起爐灶之耳仔痛) is a 1997 Hong Kong semi-experimental documentary independently produced by Yau Ching. Funded by the Hong Kong Arts Development Council, the 89-minute film explores migration, identity, and the political uncertainties surrounding 1997 handover of Hong Kong. It is Yau's first feature-length documentary.

== Synopsis ==
Following the 1989 Tiananmen Square massacre, a wave of emigration swept Hong Kong, many left for Western democratic countries. The dilemma of whether to stay or leave Hong Kong became particularly vocal in the activists communities. Many of the interviewees in this documentary were actively involved in Hong Kong's early democratic or social movements. Fear of the same tragedy might occur after 1997 handover, they ultimately chose to leave.

Over several years, Yau interviewed eight Hongkongers who emigrated overseas or returned to Hong Kong preceding the 1997 handover, exploring their reasons, their perceptions of identity, and their anxieties about Hong Kong's future. Among those is former Legislative Councillor Christine Loh, a British citizen, who tells the story of how she began involving in politics and explains why she became a supporter of democracy; Mabel, who returned from America, was a reporter in her 30s working at a local newspaper at the time of filming in 1996; Grace Ma Lai-wa (Note: Chinese name 馬麗華 Ma Lai-wa, born 1953, was an activist, co-founder of "64 bar" (1990-2004) and owner of "71 bar" (2004-?). She still identifies with the Chinese national identity as with many older generation Hongkongers in 2017.), owner of the "71 bar" in Sheung Wan was in her 40s, temporarily left Hong Kong to Toronto with her kids in early 1990s, returned herself and operated her bar ever since; Denise Tang Chi-san, who went to Vancouver to study and stayed there from early 1990s; the academics couple, Tsing Nam-kiu and Ho Chi-kwan, a mathematician and a social scientist respectively, who returned to Hong Kong in late-1992 with their 8-month-old daughter. Yau also incorporates her own image and personal experiences into the work.

== Themes and style ==
The Chinese title, 另起爐灶之耳仔痛, evokes the discomfort of displacement and the difficulties of adapting to changing political and cultural environments. The phrase 另起爐灶, literally building a new stove, refers to the emigration or the "Diaspora" in the title. The Chinese subtitle "耳仔痛", literally ear pain, and its English version "Dead Air" refer to the pain caused by air pressure during airplane landing. It correlates to the situation of pre-1997 Hong Kong. As it is changing hand from British to Chinese, the political identity of the Hongkongers faced a crisis. Some accepted and identifies themselves as Chinese citizens, while others refused to and sought to leave. Both present in the film.

Footages were filmed at least from 1992 to 1996. As a work centered around the pre-handover anxieties of Hongkongers in the 1990s, she explained in an interview with Gina Marchetti that the process helped her cope with her own pre-handover anxieties as well. After the 1989 Tiananmen Square massacre, Yau went to study and taught in New York, and she participated film festivals in American and Canada. She ultimately returned to Hong Kong. The work also considers gender and sexuality alongside questions of political identity, reflecting Yau's broader interest in feminist and queer perspectives.

== Release and reception ==
The film premiered in Hong Kong on 4 June 1997, the eighth anniversary of the 1989 Tiananmen Square massacre. A subsequent screening was scheduled for 30 June 1997, the final day of British colonial rule in Hong Kong, at Hong Kong Arts Centre. These historical dates underscored the film's political message, connecting with the political anxieties surrounding the 1989 crackdown and the impending 1997 handover.

In May 2017, the newly founded Hong Kong Actual Images Association (香港真實影像協會) held a retrospective programme titled "From '80s to '97" (從八十到九七) at HKICC Lee Shau Kee School of Creativity. The programme featured eleven documentaries and non-fiction films made between 1987 and 1998, including Blackbird (1987), Sunless Days (1990), In Big Trouble (1995), Hong Kong Road Movie (1996), Neon Goddesses (1996), As Time Goes By (1997), Yang ± Yin: Gender in Chinese Cinema (1997), Still Love You After All These (1997), Celebration in the Bitter Songs 97 (1997), Journey to Beijing (1998), and this film.

A short version of the film won the 1st IFVA Hong Kong Independent Short Film and Video Awards (Gold or silver prize, unspecified).

While Yau included her own experience, she later examined her earlier works in an article published in 2012 and pointed out the film didn't explore her family legacy and its connection to political histories, including the ways it is related to her works. In 2017, the 20th anniversary of the handover, some of the interviewees' choices and struggles to whether stay or leave Hong Kong were revisited. Mabel, Grace, Tsing Nam-kiu and Ho Chi-kwan ultimately stayed in Hong Kong until at least 2017. (another wave of emigration happened post-2019 Anti-ELAB Movement)

== See also ==
- Emigration from Hong Kong
