= Thunder Cops II =

1989 Hong Kong film by Jeffrey Lau

- Film poster bearing the alternative title 來自江湖 (From the jianghu)
- Traditional Chinese: 流氓差婆
- Hanyu Pinyin: Liúmáng chà pó
- Directed by: Jeffrey Lau
- Screenplay by: Jeffrey Lau
- Produced by: Wong Hoi (黃海)
- Starring: Sandra Ng; Stephen Chow
- Cinematography: Peter Ngor
- Edited by: Cheung Ka-fai; Hai Kit-wai
- Music by: Lowell Lo
- Production companies: First Films; Golden Flare Films Company
- Distributed by: Golden Harvest Productions (Hong Kong)
- Release date: 18 November 1989; (Hong Kong)
- Running time: 93 minutes
- Country: Hong Kong
- Language: Cantonese
- Box office: HK $5,624,622

Thunder Cops II (Chinese: 流氓差婆; pinyin: Liúmáng chà pó; lit. 'rogue policewoman'; also known as Chinese: 雌雄雙辣; pinyin: Cíxióng shuāng là; lit. 'as sexy as a woman but as fierce as a man' and Chinese: 來自江湖; pinyin: Láizì jiānghú; lit. 'From the jianghu') is a 1989 Cantonese-language Hong Kong action film directed by Jeffrey Lau. The film's English title frames it as a sequel to the 1989 film Operation Pink Squad II, which was also known as Thunder Cops, though its various Chinese titles do not indicate any connection between the films.

== Plot ==
Policewoman Fong Ngai Nam interferes with her father's investigation of Chan Leung. Chan Leung captures Nam and forces her father to drop his gun, then he shoots her father and escapes. Nam trains hard to become a better officer and seeks to avenge her father's death.

Fong Ngai Nam brings the heroin-addicted informant Mo Sui Tsan drugs and money and obtains information that Chan Leung and Fei Tsat are planning to meet in a restaurant called Taiyun to make a deal. The police set up a capture, but Fong Ngai Nam sneaks into the restaurant and attempts to shoot Chan Leung, who dodges the bullet and escapes with Fei Tsat. While they are hiding, Fei Tsat steals Chan Leung's money at gunpoint. Nam is later berated by her superior for spoiling the capture.

In exchange for heroin, Mo Sui Tsan tells Nam to find Chan Leung's younger brother, who is working at a bar called Scotties. Later, Mo Sui Tsan calls Nam to her apartment, but it is a setup orchestrated by Fei Tsat, who is waiting for her. Mo Sui Tsan and Nam's new partner Tin Lai Sum are both killed as they try to protect Nam, who hides and survives.

The police discover that Nam has been taking drugs from the exhibit store to pay off her informant, so they arrest her and interrogate her in a freezing room. Nam's father gave testimony against her interrogator Jeff Lau two years earlier, so Lau now takes revenge on Nam by accusing her not only of stealing the drugs but also of first-degree murder, concocting a story that she and Tin Lai Sum were drug dealers and that Nam killed Tin Lai Sum to take her share of the profits. After Lau leaves, Nam begs policeman Sao Ko to let her escape, which he does.

Chan Leung's younger brother Siu Yien, who is on bad terms with Fei Tsat for refusing to deal drugs for him, is found by Chan Leung's associate Lung Ko, who wants to find Fei Tsat and retrieve what Fei Tsat stole from them. When Siu Yien says that he does not know Fei Tsat's location, Lung Ko shoots and kills Siu Yien's friend and shoots Siu Yien in the inner thigh. Nam enters and kills Lung Ko's men, but Lung Ko is only wounded in the shoulder before Nam carries Siu Yien away and removes the bullet from his thigh.

Siu Yien helps Nam locate Fei Tsat in a public place, but as she attempts to capture him, Lung Ko and his men attack and begin shooting. Several innocent bystanders are shot, and Jeff Lau appears and shoots Nam while Lung Ko takes Fei Tsat prisoner and flees. Siu Yien carries Nam to safety and has a doctor remove the bullet from her body.

Nam surprises Chan Leung, but instead of killing him, she demands that he release Fei Tsat so that she can arrest him. Chan Leung's men overpower her by throwing rocks, then Siu Yien comes to her rescue and hides her behind some sheets of cloth. The criminals attack with swords, but Siu Yien manages to hold most of them off. Chan Leung slices Nam's back, but she grabs a sword off the ground and cuts off his head.

== Cast ==
- Sandra Ng as Fong Ngai Nam
- Stephen Chow as Siu Yien
- Ann Bridgewater as Mo Sui Tsan
- Shing Fui-On as Fei Tsat Ko
- Wu Fung as Sao Ko
- Eddy Ko Hung as Nam's father
- Lin Hsiao-Lu as Tin Lai Sum
- Jeffrey Lau as Police Chief Jeff Lau
- Wong Chi-Keung as Thug in restaurant
- Sunny Fang Kang as Chan Leung
- Rico Chu as Siu Chu
- Lo Hung as Policeman
- Jobic Wong Lai-Keung
- Lai Kim-Sing
- Wong Man-Shing as Chan Leung's Man
- Yuen Lung-Kui
- Chan Yuen-Kai
- Peter Ngor
- James Cheung Ying-Wa as Chan Leung's man
- Pomson Shi as Lung Ko
- Wong Aau
- Bruce Law Lai-Yin as Chan Leung's man
- Faan Man-Fan
- Ruby Wong
- Fan Wing-Wah
- Che Kwok-Wa
- Gregory Charles Rivers
- Lawrence Lau Jun-Wai
- Hai Kit-Wai
- Wong Kit (黃傑)
- Simon Cheung Yuk-San
- Lee Wah-Kon
- Wong Chi-Hok
- Cho Yuen-Tat
- Joe Chu Cho-Kuen
- Choi Hin-Cheung

== Production ==
The action director was Yuen Cheung-Yan.

== Reception ==
Reviewer Paul Bramhall of cityonfire.com wrote, "Impacts, hard falls, and some impressive choreography are all present and accounted for. When it comes to everything else though, Thunder Cops 2 doesn't really hit the mark. While it's well known that many Hong Kong movies had their scripts made up as they went along during the golden era, here it's never felt truer. There's a real feeling that, outside of the plot outline of a police woman looking to avenge the death of her father, everything else was simply made up on the fly. Notably Stephen Chow doesn't even turn up until over an hour in, and he's never really around long enough to feel like a significant character, despite his appearance in the finale being reliant on the audience being invested in him."

A review on sogoodreviews.com reads, "This one gets complicated already at the title stage. A sequel in name only to Jeff Lau's horror-comedy Thunder Cops (an effort that in itself was a sequel to Lau's Operation Pink Squad), supposedly it was made to cash in on title and its lead Sandra Ng. Throwing out almost all comedy and horror to instead bring us a downbeat vigilante actioner, Lau's handling is rough and routinely plotted in several ways. However, despite being more or less the queen of comedy at this time, Sandra Ng goes down admirable dramatic roads as an actress for this one, something that would develop into something greater during the latter half of the 90s. Yuen Chueng Yan's action directing is also gritty and brutal (the stair shoot-out is a stylish piece of work in the 80s Hong Kong cinema tradition) and possibly employed due to the impact Tiger Cage made. Finally, the movie features a slight comedic supporting turn by Stephen Chow, before his stardom, as Ng's informant."

Reviewer Phil Mills of fareastfilms.com gave the film a rating of 2 out of 5 stars, writing, "Although it features both Sandra Ng and Stephen Chow, 'Thunder Cops II' is a far cry from the comic capers that they are both known for. This is in fact a dramatic take on the 'Battling Babes' genre that sees Ng thrust firmly into the spotlight." The review concludes, "'Thunder Cops II' is an uncharacteristically poor Jeff Lau movie that really has very little to recommend. Admittedly some of the action is passable but the rest of the movie is generally so damn depressing and sloppy that I wouldn't personally want to sit through it again." In an earlier review, Phil Mills wrote, "'Thunder Cops II' is a highly depressing film and one that I found difficult to enjoy, especially with the unnecessary violence and dislikeable characters/scenarios. Stephen Chow's star status is now a handy way to market the DVD but don't be fooled by his name on the packaging as this is not his film and is probably one he would rather leave off his filmography."

A review on brns.com gave the film a rating of 7 out of 10 and reads, "If you came here for a comedy, turn around and leave. If you came here to be slapped across the face till you are black and blue this is the right place to be. This film is a continuous assault against your senses. It is absolutely brutal and intense from beginning to end. I am in dire need of a Stephen Chow film after this. Wait a second, this was a Stephen Chow film. How did I manage to rent three Chow films and none of them were comedies?" The review concludes, "I think in the end that I appreciated this film - great acting jobs, intriguing cinematography and good action - but by the end credits you may be reaching for your prozak medication."

Reviewer Boris Khokhlov of hkcinema.ru wrote, "One of Hong Kong's most talented directors, Jeff Lau, built a career on mystical and action comedies, but from time to time he tried to break out of these genres, trying himself on another field – in 'Thunder Cops 2', which he shot immediately after two parts of 'Operation Pink Squad', Lau tried himself as a drama director. Unfortunately, without much success. [...] Jeff Lau has shot a lot of good pictures in his long career, but 'Thunder Cops 2' is perhaps his worst project. Unbalanced, unpleasant and slurred – a film that will remain in my memory only because of the unusual role of Ann Bridgewater and as a rare example of a film that Steven Chow does not improve, but only spoils."

Reviewer Senesi Michele Man of asianfeast.org wrote that Thunder Cops II is "a brutal and ruthless, as well as unusual, crime film in which Sandra Ng takes on all the evils and despair of the world. There had already been several female-led crime films, including by the same director (Operation Pink Squad), but in this case, the violence and brutality of the events are astonishing, thanks in part to Sandra Ng, who is unpleasant, masculine, immoral, and violent, yet tenderly sweet at the same time. [...] On top of all this pulp culture and rough directing, we have a dirty, crude, and rather clumsy film. But, just when things are at their best, the director's mastery explodes. Jeff Lau decides to take a leaf out of John Woo's book and devote himself entirely to the action sequences, trying to renew them and make them an emotional experience for both the characters and the viewer."
