= Fist of Fury (disambiguation) =

Fist of Fury or Jing Wu Men may refer to:

- Fist of Fury, a 1972 Hong Kong martial arts film directed by Lo Wei and starring Bruce Lee
- New Fist of Fury, a 1976 Hong Kong martial arts film directed by Lo Wei and starring Jackie Chan
- Fist of Fury (1995 TV series), a 30 episodes TV series produced by ATV and starring Donnie Yen
- Fist of Fury 1991, a 1991 Hong Kong martial arts film starring Stephen Chow
- Fist of Fury 1991 II, a sequel film to Fist of Fury 1991 released in the same year

== See also ==
- Fists of Fury
