= Jing Wu Men =

Jing Wu Men (simplified Chinese: 精武门; traditional Chinese: 精武門; Cantonese: Ching Mou Mun) may refer to:

- Chin Woo Athletic Association, a Chinese martial arts school founded by Huo Yuanjia
- Fist of Fury, a 1972 film starring Bruce Lee
- Fist of Fury 1991, a 1991 film starring Stephen Chow
- Fist of Fury (TV series), a 1995 TV series starring Donnie Yen
