= Love Is Love (film) =

1990 Hong Kong film by Tony Leung

- Traditional Chinese: 望夫成龍
- Simplified Chinese: 望夫成龙
- Hanyu Pinyin: Wàngfū Chénglóng
- Directed by: Tony Leung Siu Hung
- Written by: Tut-hei Tang; Kwong Kim Yip
- Produced by: He Lichang
- Starring: Stephen Chow; Suki Kwan; Sandra Ng
- Cinematography: Zhao Weijian
- Music by: Lu Guanting
- Release date: 15 February 1990
- Running time: 91 minutes
- Country: Hong Kong
- Language: Cantonese

Love Is Love is a 1990 Hong Kong romantic comedy film directed by Tony Leung Siu Hung and written by Tut-hei Tang and Kwong Kim Yip. The film stars Stephen Chow, Suki Kwan, and Sandra Ng. The film premiered in Hong Kong on 15 February 1990.

== Plot ==
Shi Jinshui and Wu Daidi were raised in the countryside and are childhood sweethearts, but Wu Daidi's father is against their marriage. They elope from their hometown to begin a new life in the city. After a marital squabble, Wu Daidi goes missing and Shi Jinshui leaves for Singapore with his superior.

== Cast ==
- Stephen Chow as Shi Jinshui
- Sandra Ng as Wu Daidi
- Suki Kwan as Nancy, Shi Jinshui's superior
- Shing Fui-On as Wu Daidi's father
- Pauline Kwan
- Fung Woo
- Peter Lai (Chinese: 黎彼得, Lai Bei-Dak) as Mr Lai

== Release ==
The film was released in Hong Kong on 15 February 1990.
