= The Haunted Cop Shop II =

1988 Hong Kong sequel film by Jeffrey Lau

- Film poster
- Traditional Chinese: 猛鬼學堂
- Hanyu Pinyin: Měng guǐ xuétáng
- Directed by: Jeffrey Lau
- Screenplay by: Jeffrey Lau; Barry Wong Ping-Yiu; Lawrence Lau Jun-Wai (劉俊偉)
- Produced by: Alan Tang
- Starring: Wong Yue
- Cinematography: Koo Kwok-Wah
- Edited by: Cheong Bei-Dak
- Music by: Chan Fei-Lit
- Production company: In-Gear Film Production Co., Ltd.
- Release date: 28 April 1988 (Hong Kong)
- Running time: 92 minutes
- Country: Hong Kong
- Language: Cantonese
- Box office: HK $10,188,536

The Haunted Cop Shop II (Chinese: 猛鬼學堂; pinyin: Měng guǐ xuétáng; lit. 'Haunted Academy'), also known as The Haunted Cop Shop of Horror II, is a 1988 Cantonese-language Hong Kong comedy horror film directed by Jeffrey Lau. It is the sequel to his debut film The Haunted Cop Shop (1987).

== Plot ==
Representatives of various industries meet at the police station to decide how to eliminate the vampire threat. Superintendent Shun inadvertently takes on responsibility for the task just as it is discovered that there are vampires in the police station. Kam Mak-Kei has the police hold mirrors to reflect the sunlight from outdoors up to the top floor, burning a vampire to ash who was biting Man Chiu. Shun puts Man Chiu and Kam Mak-Kei in charge of his new ghostbuster team (the Hong Kong Royal Police Monster & Special Crime Research & Action Unit).

P.C. 37119, a.k.a. Little Bald, eagerly joins the unit due to the promise of a higher salary, but finds out that the salary is the same. Meanwhile, a Senior Inspector sends an unlucky officer named Bad Luck to train the new unit in order to move her bad luck further away from his office. Officer 2643, a.k.a. Romeo, is selected to guard a crime scene in the house of a man who has been beheaded by an employee for not increasing his salary. At the police station, Hung Dai-Dai is put in charge of interrogating the beheaded man's murderer to learn the location of the missing head. After officer 2643 finds the head in a basketball, he requests a transfer for himself and his partner Hung Dai-Dai. They are both sent to training for the new special unit.

The special unit's training is carried out at a military training academy. That night, Man Chiu turns into a doglike vampire when the moon comes out, but reverts to a person when it is covered by clouds. Sneaky Ming's twin brother Lazy Bone and his friend Ma Siu-Kung sneak into the camp and are told that they can join the special unit if they dress up like a vampire and a ghost respectively and scare the recruits, but P.C. 37119 notices this and tells the other recruits, who capture and tie up the two fake monsters.

Man-Chiu encounters a real female vampire in a nearby crypt who begins terrifying the special unit. The next day during training, Man-Chiu sneaks off to hammer a stake through her heart, but her chest is so hard that it breaks the stake. That night, Man-Chiu brings her back to the training academy, where tries to attack the recruits.

At the suggestion of recruit Little Witch, the recruits dress up and play the roles of the Taoist Eight Immortals in an attempt to fight off the vampire. This fails, so they enter the labyrinthine crypt and find Man-Chiu, who intermittently turns into doglike vampire form as they search for the vampire. They find more vampires in the crypt and eventually destroy them by flooding the crypt with water and running and electrical charge through the water, with Lazy Bone creating the final electrical connection to the female vampire using his urine.

== Cast ==
- Ricky Hui as Man Chiu
- Jacky Cheung as Kim Mak-Kei
- Sandy Lam as Bad Luck
- Billy Lau as Lazy Bone
- Prudence Liew as Little Witch
- Kitty Chan as Hung Dai-Dai
- Wu Fung as Superintendent
- James Yi Lui as Romeo
- Chan Fan-Hung as Little Bald
- Wan Lai-Yin as Vampire in red
- So Ga-Bo as Vampire in white
- Meg Lam (林建明) as Madame Ming
- Helena Law Lan as Ms Yellow
- Koo Kwok-Wah as Ma Siu-Keung
- Gam Biu as Manager Lau
- Charlie Cho as Representative of Hair Dressing Association
- Lo Hung as Representative of the tax department
- Wong Kar-Wai as Sir Wong
- Barry Wong Ping-Yiu as Senior Inspector
- Jeffrey Lau as Police Sergeant
- Pak Sha-Lik as Police Sergeant
- Lai On-Yi as Police Sergeant
- Ngai Tim-Choi as Police Sergeant 2812
- Piggy Chan (陳錦泉) as Police negotiator
- Rico Chu as Policeman
- Lee Ho-Kwan as Policeman
- Luk Ying-Hong as Participant in vampire meeting
- Wai Ching as Participant in vampire meeting
- Ho Chi-Moon as Participant in vampire meeting
- Kan Tat-Wah as Military officer
- Sam Kin-Sang as Policeman
- Jonnie Kong (江約誠)

== Reception ==
In his essay "Animated Pasts and Unseen Futures: on the Comic Element in Hong Kong Horror" contained in the 2018 book Hong Kong Horror Cinema, Andrew Grossman writes that "Attempts at social satire in jiangshi farces are rarely developed, however. For instance, Jeff Lau's Haunted Cop Shop 2 (1988), with a screenplay by Wong Kar-wai, contains an early, amusing scene in which a police administrator besieged by vampires asks whether he can tax the undead to cover budget shortfalls. But the satire is soon dropped in favour of frantic slapstick."

A review on the website theaterofguts.com reads, "HCS2 doesn't start, so much as burst forth like a juggernaut of Chinese vampires and headless ghosts. [...] Cop Shop 2 is extremely slapstick and very wacky with the police office banter, it goes out of its way for cheap laughs beyond the scenes of ghost hunting and vampire slaying. The film switches gears for awhile and basically goes into a Hong Kong Police Academy only with severed heads stuck in basketballs! [...] This film is out of its gourd and even with all the random moments and insanity, its [sic] a total blast!"

A review on sogoodreviews.com reads, "That Jeff Lau manages to maintain such a frantic pace without losing sight of the entertainment value (even though this type of film is very uniquely Hong Kong so your Hollywood movie fan friends may scratch their heads) is a testament to his particular skills. While thoroughly silly, low-brow and downright childish, Lau has a great pulse on the energy to his horror-comedy, even delivering dependent scares and gore along the way."

A review by Boris Khokhlov on hkcinema.ru reads, "In 'The Haunted Cop Shop 2' there is nothing even remotely memorable and original, but, like many horror-comedies of that time, it looks good and is very benign - even despite the fact that in the finale, the screenwriters for some reason go crazy and brutally kill several main characters. In principle, such changes in mood and plot are one of the distinctive features of 80s Hong Kong trash, so there is nothing surprising about it."

The website 10000tip.com gave the film a rating of 7 out of 10, writing, "This installment was even more fun than the previous one. The characters had distinct personalities, and the scarier, more hilarious moments (thanks to the character's idle cop style). The final fight against the ghosts was incredibly suspenseful. The final battle was exhausting. There were so many sacrifices. It's like the people who died weren't the ones who were killed, but they died to save others. This is something I remember a lot from watching it for the first time as a child. Most Chinese ghost-fighting films didn't feature the main characters dying, but this one had so many deaths, and they were sacrifices. In other films back then, if a good person tried to save someone, they usually survived. But in this one, so many good people have to die before your very eyes, the film manages to be more heartbreaking than you might think. It's fun, hilarious, and has all the elements. I liked it even more than the first one. The horror aspect is excellent. There's blood and gore, and the ghosts are so brutal that even the faint of heart might want to cover their eyes. But if you like this style, you won't be disappointed."

A brief review in the 1993 book The Illustrated Vampire Movie Guide states, "This improved sequel to the 1984 original features non-stop action. The vampire creature is destroyed by the hero relieving himself into a swimming pool and completing an electrical circuit!"

In the book Asian Trash Cinema 001, author Craig Ledbetter writes, "Don't be misled by the title. Nor by the fact that it's 'Part 2.' This movie is really hot. It's nonstop action (even before the credits role [sic]) and the ending is....well, yes...unforgettable. The hero kills the vampire/creature by urinating into a pool, thus completing an electrical circuit, frying the monster. The hero's buddy laments his friend’s unfortunate (yet noble) death by saying: 'I'll think of him every time I piss.' They don’t make 'em like that in America!"

Taliesin Meets the Vampires gave the film a rating of 4.5 out of 10, writing, "I was struck, when I watched the first Haunted Cop Shop, that the ostensibly comedic vehicle was rescued by its surprisingly high level of gore. Unfortunately this sequel pretty much eschewed the gore for comedy. [...] The decision to really concentrate on the comedy, for me, knocked this a notch below the first film. The scenes with the zompires could have been really effective but, again, comedy was the order of the day rather than horror". The review concludes, "This wasn't terrible but it could have been much better."
