= Queen of Kowloon =

2000 Hong Kong film by Clarence Fok

Queen of Kowloon 九龍皇后
- Film poster
- Directed by: Clarence Fok
- Written by: Sharon Hui
- Starring: Suki Kwan; Deanie Ip; Wayne Lai; Kwan Hoi-san; Teresa Ha
- Production companies: The Storm Riders Management Company; Universe Entertainment
- Release date: 17 November 2000
- Running time: 100 minutes
- Country: Hong Kong
- Language: Cantonese
- Box office: HK$0.397 million

Queen of Kowloon (Chinese: 九龍皇后; pinyin: Gau lung wong hau) is a 2000 Hong Kong drama film directed by Clarence Fok.

Tsang Tsou Choi, nicknamed the "King of Kowloon", made an appearance in the film.

== Cast ==
- Suki Kwan
- Deanie Ip
- Wayne Lai
- Kwan Hoi-san
- Teresa Ha
- Lau Kong
- Helena Ma Hoi Lun
- Hui Fan
- Fung Wai Hang
- Debbie Tam Kit Man
- Tang Wing San
