= Hu-Du-Men =

1996 Hong Kong film by Shu Kei

- Film poster
- Traditional Chinese: 虎度門
- Simplified Chinese: 虎度门
- Literal meaning: Tiger Pass Gate
- Hanyu Pinyin: hǔ dù mén
- Jyutping: fu2 dou6 mun4
- Directed by: Shu Kei
- Written by: Raymond To
- Produced by: Clifton Ko
- Starring: Josephine Siao; Anita Yuen; Daniel Chan; Waise Lee; Chung King-fai
- Cinematography: Bill Wong Chung-Piu
- Edited by: Eric Kwong Chi-Leung; Shu Kei
- Music by: Otomo Yoshihide
- Production companies: Filmtown International; Ko Chi Sum Films
- Release date: 4 April 1996
- Running time: 87 minutes
- Country: Hong Kong
- Language: Cantonese

Hu-Du-Men (Chinese: 虎度門, lit. Tiger Pass Gate), also known as Stage Door, is a 1996 Hong Kong comedy film directed by Shu Kei. The film was selected as the Hong Kong entry for the Best Foreign Language Film at the 69th Academy Awards, but was not accepted as a nominee.

== Meaning ==
"Hu-Du-Men" (虎度門) refers to the "stage door" where actors and actresses enter the stage to perform in a Cantonese opera. The stage door is a gateway between the actor (or actress) and the role he (or she) is going to play; once goes out of that door and gets on stage, he has to forget who he is and be the person he is tasked to act.

It is believed that "Hu-Du-Men" (literally means "Tiger Passing Gate") is a mistranslation of "Kwai-Du-Men" (鬼度門, literally means "Ghost Passing Gate") or "Du-Gu-Men" (渡古門, literally means "Gateway to the Past"). The stage door is called "Ghost Passing Gate" or "Gateway to the Past" by non-Cantonese troupe (外江戲班) because actors and actresses are playing historical figures who have died a long time ago. When actors and actresses pass the stage door and step on stage, they are no longer themselves but the roles they are given.

== Plot ==
A famous Cantonese opera actress Lang Kim-Sam (冷劍心, played by Josephine Siao Fong-Fong, 蕭芳芳) has been in the theater industry for thirty years, and finally has to face the "stage door" of her life: Cantonese opera has reached the time when it needs subtle reform, but there are many difficulties in implementing it. Meanwhile, her husband, Chan Yiu-Jo (陳耀祖, played by Chung King-Fai, 鍾景輝) has reached a dead-end in his career and wants to move to Australia. He wants Kim-Sam to leave the theater troupe and joins him. To make things worse, her best friend and the male lead in the troupe, Ah Lung (應文龍, played by Waise Lee Chi-Hung, 李子雄) has a crush on her and her fifteen-year-old daughter, Mimi Chan Man (陳雯, played by Michelle Wong Man, 黃雯), is suspected of having homosexual tendencies and has a girlfriend. Even worse, her illegitimate son Wong Man-Chun (王文俊, played by Daniel Chan Hiu-Tung, 陳曉東) who was born and abandoned in Nanyang twenty-two years ago, who happens to fall in love with Yip Yuk-Seung (葉玉霜), the female lead in the troupe (played by Anita Yuen Wing-Yee, 袁詠儀) flies from Canada to watch Yuk-Seung's performance, and meet Kim-Sam for the first time. On her last performance, with her abandoned son sitting in the audience and who appears to know nothing about his biologicial mother performing on stage, Kim-Sam choked with sobs and was almost unable to go on. She finally dries her tears and steps out of the "Hu-Du-Men" and plays the role on stage.

== Cast ==
- Josephine Siao as Lang Kim-Sum
- Anita Yuen as Yip Yuk-Sum
- Daniel Chan as Wong Man-Chun
- Waise Lee as Lung
- Chung King-fai as Chan Yiu-Cho

== See also ==
- List of submissions to the 69th Academy Awards for Best Foreign Language Film
- List of Hong Kong submissions for the Academy Award for Best Foreign Language Film
