= Shu Kei =

Hong Kong film director and screenwriter

Shu Kei (Chinese: 舒琪; Jyutping: syu1 kei4) or Kenneth Ip is a Hong Kong film director, screenwriter, and film critic active during the 1980s and 1990s. A graduate of The University of Hong Kong, he is best known for the 1990 film Sunless Days (沒有太陽的日子), a documentary exploring the Tiananmen Square massacre and its influence on the people of Hong Kong in the days preceding the 1997 handover of the territory to the People's Republic of China. The documentary received an OCIC Award at the 1990 Berlin International Film Festival.

Prior to filmmaking, Shu worked as a film critic, and is one of the co-founders of the Hong Kong Film Critics Society. Funscreen Weekly referred to him as "an important film critic in Hong Kong" even before he began his career in film distribution and filmmaking. He was the dean of film and television at the Hong Kong Academy for Performing Arts from 2005 to 2016.

== Selected filmography ==
- Sunless Days (1990)
- Hu-Du-Men (1996)
- Tracey (2018)
