= Operation Pink Squad II =

1989 Hong Kong film by Jeffrey Lau

- Film poster
- Traditional Chinese: 猛鬼大廈
- Hanyu Pinyin: Měng guǐ dàshà
- Directed by: Jeffrey Lau
- Screenplay by: Jeffrey Lau
- Produced by: Wong Hoi (黃海)
- Cinematography: Koo Kwok-Wah
- Edited by: Mok Git-Wai; Cheung Kwok-Kuen
- Music by: Chung Ting-Yat
- Production companies: First Films; Golden Flare Films Company
- Distributed by: First Films (Hong Kong); First Fistributors (Hong Kong)
- Release date: 1 April 1989; (Hong Kong)
- Running time: 93 minutes
- Country: Hong Kong
- Language: Cantonese
- Box office: HK $11,151,575

Operation Pink Squad II (Chinese: 猛鬼大廈; pinyin: Měng guǐ dàshà; lit. 'Haunted Tower'), also known as Operation Pink Squad 2: The Haunted Tower and Thunder Cops, is a 1989 Cantonese-language Hong Kong ghost film directed by Jeffrey Lau. The film's English title frames it as a sequel to the 1988 film Operation Pink Squad, whereas its Taiwanese title Kui Xing Kicks the Dipper 2: The Haunted Tower (Chinese: 魁星踢斗2 猛鬼大廈; pinyin: Kuíxīng tī dòu 2 měng guǐ dàshà) frames it as a direct sequel to the 1987 film The Haunted Cop Shop, which was titled Kui Xing Kicks the Dipper (Chinese: 魁星踢斗; pinyin: Kuíxīng tī dòu) in Taiwan.

== Plot ==
Yì Bànshì hears his new wife Hīn Ngàuh Fāa calling out "Johnny", the name of her former pet pig, and believes that it is the name of her former lover. He slips a radio transmitter into her bag so that he can listen in on her activities. She is selected to be part of a sting operation involving an undercover team of policewomen posing as prostitutes to entrap the criminal Maddy in a forgery sting operation, and Yì Bànshì inevitably repeatedly mistakes what he hears for infidelity.

The landlady of the apartment building where the policewomen are being housed brings in a monk to capture the ghosts in the building. All of the residents are told to leave during the monk's activities that night, but the policewomen are busy with their operation and are not notified. The monk captures the ghosts and stores them in drawstring bags, which he places behind a "door to hell" in the basement that he covers with fulu. The landlady drops one of the bags, however, enabling a female ghost to escape.

The policewomen return to the apartment building and find it empty. Yì Bànshì finds them and attacks the inspector leading the sting operation, believing him to be his wife's lover. During the tussle, the group is attacked by the female ghost, who gets her head caught between a double door being slammed. The inspector chops off her head, but her floating head and headless body are then able to attack separately. Maddy enters with a bag of money to purchase the currency printing plates from the undercover policewomen, but he trips and falls. The bag slips out of his hands and is caught by Yì Bànshì, who catches the floating head in it. Maddy grabs the bag and leaves. A fulu accidentally falls onto the body, stopping it from stabbing Yì Bànshì.

Maddy checks to make sure that his money is in the bag and finds the head. Because it is dawn, the head tells Maddy not to open the bag until it is dark. Maddy opens the bag in the sunlight to turn the head to ash, but the head makes him think that the money will burn to ash too, so he protects the head in his bag as he walks back to the building. The monk returns to the building and insists that the head will return for its body. The police hide in a room guarding the body while the monk goes outside to fight the head, but Maddy returns and holds the monk at gunpoint, forcing the police to open the door. The head reunites with its body, but the police blow up the body using a remote-controlled bomb that they implanted within it. The head explodes and covers them in blood, invoking a "blood out" revenge technique whereby the ghost gives up her second life in order to call all nearby ghosts to take revenge on those covered in her blood. Maddy and Min do not have blood on them, so the police spread the blood on Maddy but let Min leave untouched so that she can get help.

The others head to the basement, but they encounter ghosts. The monk says that a male virgin must be sacrificed and the others beat on a drum while the monk prays to summon an elf, and the elf will tear off the fulu on the "door to hell", causing all of the attacking ghosts to be sucked into hell. Maddy, the only virgin in the group, is killed by the ghosts, so the inspector offers himself to be castrated and become a born-again virgin but then reconsiders. Hīn Ngàuh Fāa offers the monk her unborn child as a sacrifice, but is unable to force the birth of the child she may or may not be carrying. The praying and beating of the drum eventually summon heavenly protectors, who force the ghosts into the door to hell and seal it again.

The end of the film shows the inspector and policewomen visiting Hīn Ngàuh Fāa after she has given birth. She discovers that her child is the elf that they were summoning. She asks the inspector not to put her undercover as a prostitute again. The inspector says that he has found someone better for job, and Yì Bànshì walks in wearing women's clothes and makeup.

== Cast ==
- Billy Lau as Yì Bànshì (易辦事), a jealous newlywed policeman
- Sandra Ng as Hīn Ngàuh Fāa (牽牛花), a newlywed policewoman
- Man Cheung as Min
- Ann Bridgewater as Anna
- Suki Kwan as Policewoman
- Wu Fung as Inspector Shin
- Cheung Choi-Mei as Ghost
- Shing Fui-On as Maddy
- Charlie Cho as Lecher
- Yuen Cheung-Yan as Buddhist monk
- Helena Law Lan as Landlady
- Walter Tso as Elf
- Lo Hung as Jealous policeman's boss
- Ernest Mauser as Police officer
- Jeffrey Lau as Man moving out of building

== Production ==
The action director was Yuen Cheung-Yan.

== Reception ==
Reviewer Angus of heroic-cinema.com gave the film a rating of 6.5 out of 10, writing, "Yes, it's the demented oddity Operation Pink Squad 2. It's trashy, over the top, illogical and cheap (even by HK standards). It's also good clean fun. The entire cast overact their little hearts out, especially Billy Lau, who's made a habit out of delivering these kinds of performances (Mr Vampire). Most of the jokes are so obvious, overplayed and tasteless that they become funny. It's also true that no matter what the context, seeing a Taoist priest casting spells and banishing beasties is always cool. So, lower your standards, invite some friends over and enjoy some crappy supernatural fun."

A review in the first issue of Asian Trash Cinema by Craig Ledbetter reads, "For the sequel, director Jeff Lau takes the girls, puts them into a horror motif and adds a touch of humor. The result is a prominent excursion into the outlandishly bizarre. [...] And the FX are so good that one almost believes it all. There's lots more, including legions of 'Living Dead-type' zombies and four Kung Fu mystics who arrive through a 'door to heaven.' These priests, armed only 'with the power of musical instruments,' go into battle against the creatures and (like an MTV video) kill them with music. This film is a must see extravaganza."

Reviewer Steve Kopian of unseenfilms.com wrote, "Broad humor mixes with supernatural chills in a film that is light on plot but big on wild and over the top action set pieces. The humor is a matter of taste and frequently falls flat. On the other hand the action set pieces are really good with the toy helicopter chase alone being worth the price of the DVD. The sequence involving toy helicopters chasing the flying head of the ghost is a wonder. The zombie attack that follows it isn't bad either-though how it's resolved has to be a zombie film first-elves. Its a wild and wacky film that is, once it gets going, an absolute blast and a half. Track it down."

Reviewer Cherycok of darksidereviews.com gave the film a rating of 7 out of 10 stars, writing, "Operation Pink Squad II is a sequel that changes course, emphasizing even more nonsensical humor and adding the supernatural. The result is sometimes hilarious, as it goes so far in its delusions. However, it is not recommended for those allergic to Cantonese humor."

The website brns.com gave the film a rating of 7.5 out of 10, writing, "While the first one was a combination of comedy, girls with guns and drama – here he throws out any attempts at drama but adds horror to the mix. It makes for 90-minutes of rarely slow down wacky fun like the way they used to do it back in the 80's. With no big stars in the cast, Lau makes this into a fast moving ensemble piece that gives everyone plenty of screen time and lots of out of breath moments. [...] But this is more comedy and the supernatural than girls with guns and thankfully with its low budget look it keeps the special effects to a minimal but enjoyably tacky level."

Reviewer Ken Miller of monsterzone.org wrote, "this movie is crammed with very broad, farcical humour, much of it centred around a buffoonish, newlywed policeman (Lau) believing that his cop wife (Ng) is having a fling with her boss, Inspector Shin (Fung). [...] The overly slapstick film gives us such silliness as Inspector Shin posing as a cross-dressing pimp, a parody of the slo-mo Chow Yun-Fat corridor moment from A BETTER TOMORROW and a scene where two of the guys take part in a literal pissing contest."

Reviewer Andrew Pragasam of thespinningimage.co.uk gave the film a rating of 6 out of 10, writing, "Embracing the radical tonal shifts that were part and parcel with the New Wave era of HK cinema, Lau's typically scattershot pop culture riffs encompass a dream sequence parodying Chow Yun-Fat's iconic shootout from A Better Tomorrow (1986), a climax wherein the cast morph into mythological characters to do battle with bloodthirsty zombies and the obligatory tasteless sexual humour. Yet also the odd instance of sly satire. In a dig at the money-mad mentality of Eighties Hong Kong here even a murderous ghost can negotiate a deal with a crooked businessman. [...] Remarkably the scary sequences deliver solid visceral thrills, employing ingenious practical effects with effective results. Most notably in the film's most infamous scene wherein a fleet of remote-controlled toy helicopters chase after a flying severed head!"

Reviewer Kenneth Brorsson of sogoodreviews.com wrote, "Combining action, comedy and darker drama for the original Operation Pink Squad, it's a testament to the at that time new director Jeff Lau that he could strike so much gold when combining elements that ultimately are not a good fit for each other. [...] Some bursts of cheap mayhem ranks as almost excellent though." The review concludes, "You can't go wrong with taking on the experience of Jeff's 87-89 work but remember it's not a constant carnival of quality. The sights overall across his initial 5 movies are enough to rank as wonderfully entertaining though."
