= Yau Ching =

Hong Kong writer, filmmaker and scholar (born 1966)

- 游靜
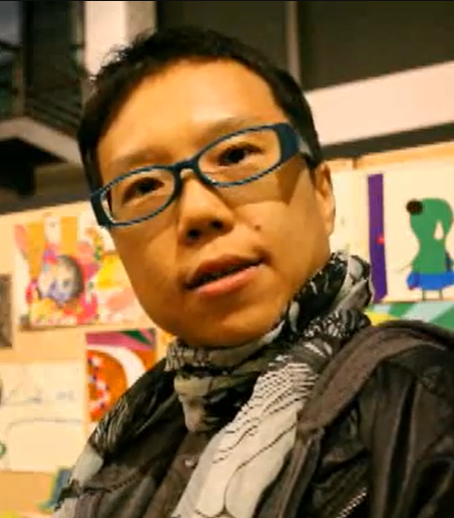
- Yau in April 2014
- Born: 1966 (age 59–60); Hong Kong
- Education: University of Hong Kong (BA); The New School for Social Research (MA); Royal Holloway, University of London (PhD)
- Occupations: Writer; filmmaker; scholar

Yau Ching (Chinese: 游靜; born 1966) is a Hong Kong writer, filmmaker, and scholar. She is considered a queer and independent filmmaker and is one of the founding members of Videotage (錄影太奇). She is openly lesbian.

== Biography ==
Yau was born and raised in Hong Kong. She majored in English and comparative literature at the University of Hong Kong and graduated in 1988. She briefly attended California State University to pursue a master's degree in theatre arts but withdrew after three months. After "what happened in 1989", she decided to study abroad again in 1990 and completed a master's degree in media studies at The New School for Social Research. During her studies, she was also accepted into the Whitney Museum of American Art's Independent Study Program in Studio Art, where filmmaker Yvonne Rainer, impressed by a short film she produced, invited her to spend a year studying filmmaking. From 1998 to 2003, she earned a PhD in Media Arts at Royal Holloway, University of London, and conducted postdoctoral research as a Rockefeller Humanities Fellow at the University of Hawaii from 2004 to 2005. She has taught at the University of Michigan, the University of California, San Diego, and Lingnan University. Currently, she is a professor at National Central University in Taiwan.

== Career ==
Let's Love Hong Kong won the Critic's Grand Prize for Fiction at the 2002 Figueira da Foz International Film Festival.

== Work ==
=== Bibliography ===
- Yau, Ching (1996). Building a New Stove 另起爐灶 (in Traditional Chinese). Hong Kong: Youth Literary Press. ISBN 962-7258-52-0.
- Yau, Ching (2011) [1999]. Stripping Skirts and Trousers 裙拉褲甩 (in Traditional Chinese) (2nd ed.). Taiwan: Mirage. ISBN 9789868606623.
- Yau, Ching (2017) [2000]. The Impossible Home 不可能的家 (2nd ed.). Hong Kong: dirty press. ISBN 9789881796936.
- Yau, Ching (2002). Ho Yuk–Let’s Love Hong Kong: Script and Critical Essays 好郁：電影劇本及評論. Hong Kong: Youth Literary Press. ISBN 962-8158-64-3.
- Yau, Ching (2004). Filming Margins: Tang Shu Shuen, a Forgotten Hong Kong Woman Director. Hong Kong University Press. ISBN 962-209-689-1.
- Yau, Ching (2005). Sexing Shadows: Gender and Sexuality in Hong Kong Cinema 性/別光影：香港電影中的性與性別文化研究 (in Traditional Chinese). Hong Kong Film Critics Society. ISBN 978-962-8271-62-7.
- Yau, Ching, ed. (2006). Sexual Politics 性政治 (in Traditional Chinese). Hong Kong: Cosmos. ISBN 9789882115316.
- Yau, Ching (2008). "Chapter 8: Performing Contradictions, Performing Bad-Girlness in Japan". Gender and Globalization in Asian and the Pacific: Method, Practice, Theory. University of Hawai'i Press. pp. 138–158. ISBN 978-0-8248-3159-2.
- Yau, Ching, ed. (2010). As Normal as Possible: Negotiating Sexuality and Gender in Mainland China and Hong Kong. Hong Kong University Press. ISBN 978-962-209-987-6.
- Yau, Ching (April 2011). Big Hairy Egg 大毛蛋 (in Traditional Chinese). Hong Kong: kubrick. ISBN 9789881935960.
- Yau, Ching (2012). "Stigma in Coalition vs. Stigma as Metaphor". Queer, Affect, Politics: Selected Essays by Heather Love 酷兒、情感、政治—海澀愛文選 (in Traditional Chinese). Taiwan: Mirage. pp. 297–307. ISBN 978-986-86066-5-4.
- Yau, Ching (2014). I Never Promised You a Rose Garden: Hong Kong Cultural Critique 我從未應許你一個玫瑰園：香港文化政治生態 (in Traditional Chinese). Hong Kong: Culture Plus. ISBN 9789881304834.
- Yau, Ching (2017). Yau Ching’s Critical Writings on Film 1987–2016 游動的影：游靜影評集1987–2016 (in Traditional Chinese). Hong Kong: Culture Plus. ISBN 9789887784517.

=== Feature films ===
- Diasporama: Dead Air (另起爐灶之耳仔痛; 1997), documentary
- Let's Love Hong Kong (好郁; 2002), aka Ho Yuk, drama
- We Are Alive (壞孩子; 2010), documentary

=== Other works of visual arts ===
- Is There Anything Specific You Want Me to Tell You About? (你有什麼特別的要我告訴你?; 1991)
- Flow (流; 1993), 39-minute
- The Ideal/Na(rra)tion (理想家／國; 1993)
- Video Letters 1-3 (錄像書簡 1-3; 1993-4)
- June 30, 1997 (慶回歸; 1997), aka Celebrate What?
- Finding Oneself (揾自己; 2000), commissioned by RTHK
- In My Father's House, There are Many Mansions (為父親命名; 2004)
