= The Haunted Cop Shop =

1987 Hong Kong film by Jeffrey Lau

- Film poster
- Traditional Chinese: 猛鬼差館
- Hanyu Pinyin: Měng guǐ chāi guǎn
- Directed by: Jeffrey Lau
- Screenplay by: Wong Kar-wai; Jeffrey Lau
- Produced by: Alan Tang
- Cinematography: Peter Ngor
- Edited by: Jeung Kwok-Ming
- Music by: Alastair Monteith-Hodge; Anders G. Nelsson
- Production company: In-Gear Film Production Co., Ltd.
- Distributed by: Golden Harvest
- Release date: 19 November 1987; (Hong Kong)
- Running time: 88 minutes
- Country: Hong Kong
- Language: Cantonese
- Box office: HK $11,748,296

The Haunted Cop Shop (Chinese: 猛鬼差館; pinyin: Měng guǐ chāi guǎn; lit. 'Haunted Police Station'), also known as The Haunted Cop Shop of Horror, is a 1987 Cantonese-language Hong Kong comedy horror film directed by Jeffrey Lau.

== Plot ==
A former policeman now living as a Buddhist monk seeking redemption revisits his old station to make amends with Chief Shun, the man he hated most before becoming a monk, by warning him firstly not to let a woman in pink enter the police station on the night of the Hungry Ghost Festival and secondly not to swear.

Kim Mak-Kei and Man Chiu arrest petty thief Sneaky Ming for stealing a bejeweled crucifix and throw him in a cell, where he is visited by a woman in a pink dress. After she releases him from his cell, he loses track of her and finds himself in a club from the time of the Japanese occupation. He attempts to play mahjong at a high-rollers table but only has his life to bet. When he loses the game, the players transform into jiangshi. They command Sneaky Ming to bring General Issei back into the physical world and transform him into a vampire. Kim Mak-Kei and Man Chiu do not believe Sneaky Ming, so they open the curtains and expose him to sunlight, turning him to ash. Their new superior Fanny Ho gives them 48 hours to re-arrest Sneaky Ming, but the only way they can explain his disappearance is to convince her that vampires are real.

When they go to the morgue to inspect the corpse of a dead woman, Kim Mak-Kei and Man Chiu bet Fanny Ho that the woman will rise as a vampire before midnight or she can use their heads as stools. After the clock reaches midnight, the woman comes alive and escapes from the morgue. The three police officers enlist the aid of two traffic cops to help them find the missing woman, but she bites them and turns them into vampires who chase after the police. Chung Fat Pak, the owner of a local establishment, saves them with his martial arts and Taoist spells, killing the traffic cops. General Issei appears and kills Chung Fat Pak, then becomes distracted by the music from a cassette recorder, enabling Fanny Ho, Kim Mak-Kei and Man Chiu to escape.

Chief Shun is annoyed with their excuse that they couldn't find Sneaky Ming because they were stopped by vampires, so he tells them to catch one for him. Fanny Ho, Kim Mak-Kei and Man Chiu go to the haunted house where the woman and General Issei are lying in their coffins, but a solar eclipse occurs before Fanny Ho can drive a stake through their hearts. The vampires rise and attack for three minutes, then the sunlight returns and burns the woman to ash. Meanwhile, General Issei has bitten Man Chiu.

The three police officers tell their story to Uncle Chung, a retired exorcist, who tells them to take seven nails from a coffin that has been buried for exactly seven years and nail them to his two arms, his two legs, his nose, his mouth and his heart. The three police officers spend the night together at Fanny Ho's house for safety, but General Issei appears and takes Fanny Ho prisoner. Man Chiu goes to the cemetery to collect coffin nails, while Kim Mak-Kei goes to the haunted house to wait for him. Chief Shun follows Kim Mak-Kei into the haunted house, where they are attacked by General Issei, who sets the house afire. Man Chiu arrives with the coffin nails and nails them into the arms of General Issei, who releases them. Day breaks, giving the men an advantage. They break the boards covering a window and let light in, burning General Issei to ash. Fanny Ho is found safe in a coffin, but the men ask her to check if she has been bitten. She says that she merely has a hickey on her breast, which they excitedly demand to investigate.

== Cast ==
- Jacky Cheung as Kim Mak-Kei
- Ricky Hui as Man Chiu
- Billy Lau as Sneaky Ming
- Kitty Chan as Chief Superintendent Fanny Ho
- Wu Fung as Chief Shun
- Chung Fat as Chung Fat Pak
- Rico Chu as General Issei (Head Vampire)
- Michelle Si-Ma Yin as Millie
- Fung Ging-Man as Uncle Wah
- Chan Kim-Wan as Uncle Chung
- Lee Yeung-Diy as Traffic policeman
- Lee Ho-Kwan as Policeman
- Liu Chun-Hung as Policeman
- Lee Sam as Policeman
- Lee Ho-Kwan as Policeman
- Liu Chun-Hung as Policeman
- Lee Sam as Policeman
- Steve Mak as Muscle man punching Chiu Man
- Chow Kong as Muscle man
- Lee Ging-Fann as Ghost bartender
- Lau Lee-Lee (劉莉莉)
- Chi Yin as Beautiful ghost in jail
- Gam Biu as Ghost playing mahjong with Sneaky
- Wai Ching as Ghost playing mahjong with Sneaky
- Jeff Lau Chun-Wai as Ghost blowing kiss to Sneaky
- Kobe Wong Kam-Bo as Monk Wai Chin
- Leung Sam (梁心) as Policeman
- Ng Kwok-Kin as Policeman
- Ting Tung as Ghost playing mahjong with Sneaky
- Sam Feng-San as Traffic policeman

== Reception ==
In the book Asian Trash Cinema 001, author Craig Ledbetter writes, "Vampires have infested a meat-packing plant. The special 'Monster Police Squad' must eradicate them. However, when they botch the job, their division looses [sic] status with the police commissioner. And they are relegated to menial jobs until the vampires invade the county hospital. Some good and scary FX, but it's mostly just silly. The sequel is better."

The website 10000tip.com gave the film a rating of 6.5 out of 10, writing, "It's a movie that combines the right amount of horror and comedy. However, I was a bit annoyed by the ending, which 'copycats' the original Fright Night, with almost every scene exactly the same. I was shocked, as I'd never seen such a complete copycat before. In conclusion, it's an enjoyable cop-and-ghost movie. It might not be as great as 'Magic Cop,' because the suspense and plot connections in old Chinese films tend to be like this. They tend to mix things up without really coherently blending them together. The story doesn't really cohere. It's like they're constantly putting different situations into the story, one scene at a time, to fill up the time. Nevertheless, the film is quite funny. The horror aspect is also quite scary. It's perfect for fans of Chinese horror films."

The review on moriareviews.com gave the film a rating of two stars, writing, "Jeffrey Lau directs with a madcap slapstick energy (the form of Hong Kong comedy known as mo lei tau)." The review concludes, "The major problem in all of this is that the film lacks anything that can be considered a plot – it is just frenetically madcap happenings where the characters move from one location to another. The film introduces the ghosts of Japanese prisoners and then forgets all about them and then we just suddenly have a vampire appear inside the prison. Typically the film introduces Fat Chun's vampire hunter in mid film, has him take on vampires and then equally abruptly forgets all about him as the scene moves on where you cannot help but think that such a character might have made a huge difference to the outcome of the action."

Reviewer Ben Stykuc of Asian Movie Pulse wrote, "Imitation is not always flattery and in Hong Kong cinema, imitation is usually about box office. In the wake of 'Mr Vampire' a whole wave of imitators followed. “The Haunted Cop Shop”, whilst sharing cast members, at least does things a bit differently with a modern setting and some excellent direction. Whilst its humour may not appeal to everyone and the ending is a bit of a letdown, it’s a perfectly enjoyable hour and a half of spooky highjinks."

A review by Paul Andolina published on bandsaboutmovies.com reads, "Most of the comedy in this film is either slapstick, or potty humor, but it really works. It's not only funny but it is pretty dang spooky as well. The ghosts and vampires in the film are scary looking and the film uses its sets to great effect to create an unsettling atmosphere. This is used extremely effectively during the fake haunting the cops use to scare Ming. The special effects for the vampires are gross as well and I couldn't help but love the whole feel of the movie."

Reviewer Kenneth Brorsson of sogoodreviews.com wrote that "it was a very entertaining Hong Kong horror comedy! [...] The emphasis is on the comedy (what else with Ricky Hui in a starring role?) and generally I'm not too much in love with the kind of humour sometimes present in Hong Kong movies but here Jeff Lau manages to put in some genuinely funny and silly moments. It helps that pretty much all the humour is visual and that creates highlights such as our main characters imitating vampires to get out of a tight spot. Simple but very amusing. [...] The horror can almost be divided into two parts, one that consciously is geared more towards the humour but there are also scenes that are pretty tense and atmospheric. Lau's very non-stylish way of directing helps create a wonderful mood where certain viewers will most certainly be slightly on the edge of their seat. [...] Jeff Lau has made a fun, sometimes scary and very entertaining horror- comedy but don't expect any huge surprises though."

Reviewer YTSL of brns.com gave the film a rating of 5.5, writing, "As many a film fan can undoubtedly attest, Hong Kong cinema is full of flabbergasting celluloid sights. [...] On still other occasions, no less bona fide “you gotta see this to believe it” moments are the products of enacted ideas that are just plain weird or bizarre as well as of questionable taste. [...] Although those Peter Ngor lensed images pretty much entirely consisted of the kind of busy plus 'exotic' looking scenes that really do occur in many ethnic Chinese communities during the Hungry Ghost Festival (that also is known as the Feast of Yu Lan), they could be said to have been imbued with the type of sophisticated verve and lively vibes that make them seem like stylistic cousins or precursors of some of those later but still contemporary Hong Kong scenes in which certain other more famous plus photogenic Wong Kar Wai movie cops would feature."

Reviewer Kozo of lovehkfilm.com wrote, "Viewing this sort of slapdash cinema with 20-20 hindsight can reveal a needlessness that renders movies like Haunted Cop Shop disposable. The film is certainly funny enough, but it lacks any qualities that could possibly propel it to the status of a Mr. Vampire. When it all comes down to it, the only necessity Haunted Cop Shop may have is as archival material. Now you can claim that you own every film with Wong Kar-Wai's paws on it. And, you can file it on your shelf under 'H'."

Reviewer John Charles of dighkmovies.com gave the film a rating of 6 out of 10, writing, "The script (co-written by Lau and Wong Kar-wai -- yes, THAT Wong Kar-wai) contains a few too many throwaway bits that don't really pay off but there are also others that amuse through sheer audacity (Macky and Chiu get revenge on their Madam by fooling her into eating dog meat, which they got by slaughtering the commander's favorite police dog!) and the horror sequences are atmospherically staged. While it does not have quite the inventiveness or comic momentum of its 1988 sequel and Lau's OPERATION PINK SQUAD II, THE HAUNTED COP SHOP is lively fun and worth tracking down."

Reviewer thechinesecinema.com wrote, "I suppose it's a kind of missing link between classic Hui Brothers comedy (with Cheung in the Sam role and a Michael figure sorely missing) and the later, much better Jeffrey Lau stuff. Maybe he needed Stephen Chow to set him on the right track."
