= The Wrong Couples =

1987 Hong Kong film by David Chiang

- Directed by: David Chiang Da Wei
- Produced by: John Shum Kin-fun
- Starring: Richard Ng; Josephine Siao
- Cinematography: Yee Tung-Lung
- Edited by: Cheung Kwok-kuen; Lee Yim-hoi
- Release date: 11 June 1987
- Country: Hong Kong
- Language: Cantonese

The Wrong Couples (Chinese: 不是冤家不聚頭; pinyin: Bat si yuen ga bat jui tau) is a 1987 Hong Kong comedy film directed by David Chiang. Da Wei starring Josephine Siao as May Wong and Richard Ng Yiu Hon as Yu Tai Dai. Josephine Siao won the Best Actress Award at the 7th Hong Kong Film Awards.

== Plot ==
Yu, a sailor, returns home and is shock to discover that not only his wife left him, but the house has also been sub-letted to an old maid, May Wong. Both Yu and Wong both having own strange habits, and having them living together under the same roof causes numerous hilarious situations.

== Cast ==
Actor	Role
Josephine Siao Fong-Fong	Wong Mui
Richard Ng Yiu-Hon	Yu Tai Dai
Paul Chun Pui	Councillor Mou Fook Lee
Dennis Chan Kwok-San	Ho Ho Ho
Pauline Kwan Pui-Lam	Yu Sam Yee
Maggie Li Lin-Lin	Ms Small
Ku Feng	Popeye
Billy Ching Sau-Yat	Ah Yau
Lam Chung (1)	Lai Wah's boyfriend
Wan Ling-Kwong	Hawker
Leung Hak-Shun	Mr Lam
Chan Yuet-Yue	Simon Yip Fai-Wong
Ma Suk-Jan	Nannie Un
Robert Mak Tak-Law	Tai Dai's apprentice
Lisa Chiao Chiao	Fong Lai Wah
Seung Yee	Judge
Tang Yuk-Wing	Street vendor
Amy Au-Yeung Suk-Lan	Popeye's wife

== Nomination and awards ==
Josphine Siao was nominated as the Best Actress in the 7th Hong Kong Film Award and won the Best Actress Title.

== Release ==
The Wrong Couples was released in June 1987 and was shown just before summer school holidays in Hong Kong. It grossed HK $8,969,422.00
