= An Orphan's Tragedy =

1955 Hong Kong film by Chu Kei

- DVD cover
- Traditional Chinese: 孤星血淚
- Simplified Chinese: 孤星血泪
- Literal meaning: tiny orphan, tears of blood
- Hanyu Pinyin: Gū xīng xuèlèi
- Jyutping: Gu1 Sing1 Hyut3 Leoi6
- Directed by: Chu Kei
- Screenplay by: Ching Kong; Chu Kei; Lau Fong
- Based on: Great Expectations by Charles Dickens
- Starring: Bruce Lee; Ng Cho-fan; Lau Hak-suen; Josephine Siao; Cheung Wood-yau
- Cinematography: Suen Lun
- Music by: Chow Long
- Production company: Union Film Enterprise
- Release date: 11 February 1955
- Running time: 113 minutes
- Country: Hong Kong
- Language: Cantonese

An Orphan's Tragedy is a 1955 Hong Kong drama film co-written and directed by Chu Kei and starring Bruce Lee, Ng Cho-fan, Lau Hak-suen, Josephine Siao and Cheung Wood-yau. The film is a loose adaptation of Charles Dickens' 1861 novel Great Expectations.

== Plot ==
Profiteer To Chai-yan (Lau Hak-suen) framed Dickson Fan (Ng Cho-fan) for selling counterfeit medicine which led Fan to ten years of unjust imprisonment. Fan escapes prison to a rural farm where he meets teenager Frank Wong (Bruce Lee), who helps him escape arrest from the police. Later on, Fan discovers that Frank is his biological son and he finds a job outside at the provincial capital in order to earn money and anonymously pay for Frank to study medicine outside of town. Frank, not knowing that Fan is his father, believes that Fan is donating money to him out of gratitude. After graduating, Frank works at To's medical company. To has always suspected Frank to be Fan's son. In order to force Fan to come out of hiding, To frames Frank the way that he framed Fan back then.

== Cast ==
- Bruce Lee as child Frank Wong Fuk-wan (based on Philip Pirrip)
  - Cheung Wood-yau as adult Frank Wong Fuk-wan
- Ng Cho-fan as Dickson Fan (based on Abel Magwitch)
- Wong Cho-san as Sam Wong (based on Joe Gargery)
- Lau Hak-suen as To Chai-yan (based on Compeyson)
- Josephine Siao as child Polly/Pui-yee (based on Estella Havisham)
  - Yung Siu-yee as adult Polly/Pui-yee
- Mui Yee - Rainbow/Choi-Hung
- Chow Chi-sing as Chow
- Ko Lo-chuen as Kwai
- Lee Pang-fei as Joseph Chan
  - Wong Fei-fei as child Rainbow/Choi-hung
- Yip Ping as Mrs. Fan
- Ling Mung as Yau
- Kam Lau as Polly's mother (based on Miss Havisham)
- Cheung Sang as Village neighbor (based on Mr. Hubble)
- Chan Lap-ban as Village neighbor (based on Mrs. Hubble)
- Chu Yau-ko as Dancing at nightclub
- Yuen Lap-cheung as Pharmacy customer
- Lam Liu-ngok as To's goon
- Fung King-man as To's goon

== See also ==
- Bruce Lee filmography
