= Sunless Days (film) =

- VCD cover
- Directed by: Shu Kei
- Produced by: Masami Ogahara
- Cinematography: Wong Chung-Piu
- Edited by: Sammy Chow Cheung-gan
- Music by: Danny Chung Teng-yat
- Production companies: NHK; Creative Workshop
- Release date: 1990
- Running time: 90 minutes

Sunless Days (沒有太陽的日子) is a Hong Kong documentary directed by Shu Kei, produced by NHK and Creative Workshop (Note: Chinese 創造社, founded by director Shu Kei). Made in the aftermath of the 1989 Tiananmen Square protests and massacre, the film examines the event through the personal experiences of people in Hong Kong and Chinese dissidents.

== Synopsis ==
Shu Kei interviews friends from his cultural circle, including director Alfred Cheung, who witnessed the massacre; actress Deanie Ip, who temporarily abandoned her plans to emigrate; screenwriter Manfred Wong, who accompanied his wife to Canada to give birth; Yang Lai-kwan, a retired editor of The New Evening Post; Taiwanese director Hou Hsiao-hsien, who had directed A City of Sadness (1989); poet and overseas Chinese dissidents Duo Duo; artist Wong Yan-kwai, who participated in reconstructing the Goddess of Democracy in Hong Kong; and members of his own family. Their conversations explore differing responses to the crackdown, including political disillusionment, grief, questions of Chinese identity, and the Hong Kong Question before the 1997 handover.

The film particularly connect the political crisis with questions of family, migration, and belonging. With just several years away from the handover, Shu Kei's conversations with his family presents a range of responses to political uncertainty. The filmmaker's second elder brother had emigrated to Australia; his eldest brother emigrated to Canada soon after 4 June; and his mother was unwilling to leave Hong Kong.

The film also features the destruction of the 28-foot-tall original Goddess of Democracy in Tiananmen Square, which was constructed on 30 May by a group of art students and only stood for days, as well as the construction of its replica in Hong Kong on 18 June.

== Production ==
The film was originally conceived as a film about Taiwanese singer Hou Dejian, who had moved to mainland China, but the 1989 Tiananmen Square protests prompted Shu Kei to change direction and instead explore how the crackdown affected Hong Kong people and overseas Chinese. Before this work, Shu Kei had previously explored the relationship between local and national politics in his script for TVB’s film 1977, directed by Yim Ho.

Opening with a poem titled "Mad Woman" (瘋女人) posted at the Tiananmen Square in May 1989 by an unknown student and a modern-dance sequence titled "Today is June 8, 1989, 4:00 P.M." choreographed by Lin Hwai-min, the film combines interviews and personal narration with artistic material. Other materials include Wang Dan's poetry, paintings by Duo Duo, and music by Cui Jian, whose song "Stepping Out" concludes the film.

Shu Kei also traveled across different parts of the world to interview different figures. He interviewed a Chinese-American dramatist in Canada, a Hong Kong doctor in Australia, Hou Hsiao-hsien in Venice, and Duo Duo in London, extending beyond Hong Kong and mainland China. It further echoes the concern with diaspora and migration in the aftermath of 4 June.

== Release and reception ==
Financed and broadcast by NHK’s Hong Kong branch, film premiered in 1990 and was released in VCD. It was shunned by major distributors because of its politically sensitive topic and 16 mm format, receiving only limited screenings at venues such as the Hong Kong Arts Centre. In June 2012, Hong Kong Inmedia screened this film. In 2013, the film was selected for Hong Kong International Film Festival (HKIFF) "Cine Fan" section.

Anna of HKEJ describes the film as "deeply personal journal", focusing on individual responses rather than historical events. She praises its sincerity, contrasting views and Shu Kei's reflections on his family and emigration.
