= Fist of Fury 1991 II =

1992 Hong Kong film by Cho Chung-sing and Corey Yuen

- Film poster
- Directed by: Cho Chung-sing; Corey Yuen
- Written by: Jeffrey Lau; Ho Tung
- Produced by: Corey Yuen; Jeffrey Lau
- Starring: Stephen Chow; Kenny Bee; Sharla Cheung; Josephine Siao
- Cinematography: Jimmy Leung; Chan Yuen-kai
- Edited by: Hai Kit-Wai
- Music by: Lowell Lo
- Production company: Chun Sing Film Company
- Distributed by: Golden Princess Amusement Company
- Release date: 1 January 1992 (Hong Kong)
- Running time: 93 minutes
- Country: Hong Kong
- Language: Cantonese
- Box office: HK$22,946,994

Fist of Fury 1991 II (漫畫威龍) is a 1992 Hong Kong comedy film co-directed by Cho Chung-sing and Corey Yuen and starring Stephen Chow in the lead role. It is a sequel to the film Fist of Fury 1991 and likewise parodies Hong Kong martial arts films, including Chow appearing in a yellow tracksuit similar to the one worn by Bruce Lee in the 1973 film Enter the Dragon. Josephine Siao stars as Peony, a masked hero named after a flower parodying Black Rose, a popular character in Hong Kong films directed by Chor Yuen in the 1960s.

== Plot ==
After Kwok Wai is defeated by Lau Ching in the final round of the martial arts tournament, his elder brother, Cheung Wan-To and his gang seek revenge. When Ching begins acting strangely due to his sorrow over the loss of his mentor, his four teachers from the New Jingwu School pledge to take care of him. Ngou Pi is a fervent Lau Ching fan who meets his hero then returns home to find his aunt Ngou Chat pretending to commit suicide out of shame that he is not yet married. Ngou Pi tells her his intention to learn kung fu, then he seeks out Ching in Kowloon and becomes his student.

Wan-To and his gang attack Ching and Ngou Pi in the street, but a masked woman intervenes and saves them. Ching takes refuge at Ngou Pi's house and meets his cousin Yuen Chuen, who looks exactly like his girlfriend Min, and his aunt Ngou Chat, whom Ching recognises as the mysterious masked woman. Ngou Pi finally works up the courage to confess his love to his cousin Yuen Chuen and she agrees to marry him. Ngou Chat explains to Ching that she does not want Ngou Pi to learn kung fu because his father was killed in a duel.

Ngou Pi and Yuen Chuen are kidnapped by Wan-To, who forces Ching to battle him in a public match for their release. Ngou Chat teaches Ching martial, including a special skill known as the Electric Fist, while his friend, Smartie, attempts unsuccessfully to woo her. Ching battles Wan-To in the ring and defeats him. During the closing credits Wan-To is shown living as a beggar following his defeat.

== Cast ==
- Stephen Chow as Lau Ching
- Josephine Siao as Peony/Ngou Chat
- Kenny Bee as Chu Kor Chun a.k.a. "Smartie"
- Sharla Cheung as Man/Yuen Chuen
- Pak-Cheung Chan as Ngou Pi
- Yuen Wah as Cheng Wan-To
- Rico Chu as Maddy
- Wan Yeung-ming as Cheung Wai
- Tak Yuen as Ngou Feng
- Siu-Wai Mui as Chu-Chu
- Feng Ku as Chu-Chu's Father
- Yuen-Yee Ng as Landlady
- Dung Hoh as Referee
- Yan Sing as Fisherman
- Chi Tung as Keung
- Fung Woo as Ching's Trainer
- Man-Biu Pak as Uncle Bill
- Szema Wah Lung as Ching's Trainer
- Hsin Liang as Ching's Trainer
- Yuen Kai Chan as Market Merchant
- Tak-Kan San as Tournament Judge
- Adam Chung-Tai Chan as To's Thug
- Stone Chan as To's Thug
- Sang Wook Kim as To's Thug
- Miu Ting Kong as To's Thug
- Shung Fung Lau as To's Thug
- Pomson Shi as To's Thug
- Chin-Hung Fan as To's Thug
- Derek Cheung Chi-Chuen as Cornerman

== Reception ==
Reviewer Kozo of lovehkfilm.com called Fist of Fury 1991 II a "generally funny but overall not-so-spectacular comedy featuring Mr. Comedy himself, Stephen Chow."

Reviewer Ryo Saeba of darksidereviews.com gave the film a rating of 5/10, writing, "Still, even if the film is uneven, there are still some very good gags and the presence of Cheung Man is always a pleasure for the eyes, especially when you have two for the price of one."

onderhond.com gave the film a rating of 3.0/5.0, writing, "A simply but amusing sequel that sees Stephen Chow taking another jab at the famous Bruce Lee classic. If you like Chow's trademark comedy, there's plenty to enjoy here. Some crazy fight scenes, some utterly daft but hilarious jokes and solid pacing. It's not the greatest film ever, but it's damn good filler."
