= Operation Pink Squad =

1988 Hong Kong film by Jeffrey Lau

- Film poster
- Traditional Chinese: 霸王女福星
- Hanyu Pinyin: bà wáng nǚ fú xīng
- Jyutping: baa3 wong4 neoi5 fuk1 sing1
- Directed by: Jeffrey Lau
- Written by: Jeffrey Lau
- Produced by: Wong Hoi
- Starring: Sandra Ng; Ann Bridgewater; Suki Kwan; Elsie Chan
- Cinematography: Johnny Koo
- Edited by: Cheung Kwok-kuen; Hai Kit-wai
- Music by: Danny Chung
- Production company: Golden Flare Films
- Distributed by: First Distributors
- Release date: 17 November 1988
- Running time: 92 minutes
- Country: Hong Kong
- Language: Cantonese

Operation Pink Squad (Chinese: 霸王女福星; Jyutping: baa3 wong4 neoi5 fuk1 sing1, released in the Philippines as Lady Enforcers Strike Again) is a 1988 Hong Kong action comedy film written and directed by Jeffrey Lau and starring Sandra Ng, Ann Bridgewater, Suki Kwan, Elsie Chan, Wu Fung, Ng Man-tat, Yuen Cheung-yan, and Ricky Hui. The film was released in Hong Kong on 17 November 1988.

== Plot ==
Inspector Wu assigns a group of female detectives to look after a blind suspect named Piu, while a female robber who previously kidnapped him is out to retrieve some diamonds she thinks he possesses.

== Cast ==
- Sandra Ng as Ng Siu-mui
- Ann Bridgewater as Plastic Flower
- Suki Kwan as dumb female cop
- Elsie Chan as Shy Grass
- Wu Fung as Wu
- Ng Man-tat as Uncle Wong
- Yuen Cheung-yan as Tired-out triad
- Ricky Hui as Dumb Ying
- Pal Sinn as Piu
- Law Ching-ho
- Billy Lau as Big Nose
- Charlie Cho as cop who gets transferred
- Chan Fai-hung
- Jeffrey Falcon as caucasian killer
- Melanie Barter as Diana
- Anna Strike as superintendent's wife

== Release ==
Operation Pink Squad was released in Hong Kong on 17 November 1988. In the Philippines, the film was released as Lady Enforcers Strike Again by First Films on 7 April 1989, connecting it to the unrelated film The Inspector Wears Skirts (released as Lady Enforcer).

== Home media ==
Operation Pink Squad was released on VHS in Japan by TDK.

The film was released on DVD by Winson Entertainment Distribution in Hong Kong on 8 February 2002. In the United States, the film was released on DVD by Televista on 20 March 2007.

== Sequel ==
The film was followed by a sequel, Operation Pink Squad II, in 1989.
