= Suki Kwan =

Hong Kong actress and model

- Chinese: 關秀媚
- Born: March 11, 1966 (age 60); British Hong Kong
- Other names: Kwan Sau Mei; Shooky Kwan; Suki Kwan; Sau Mei; Suki Kuan
- Occupations: Actress; model
- Years active: 1986–2005, occasional public appearances (2024–present)

Suki Kwan Sau Mei (Chinese: 關秀媚; born 11 March 1966) is a Hong Kong actress and former model. She was one of the notable on-screen figures in Hong Kong cinema in the late 1980s through the early 2000s, credited with over 50 film roles. Although she largely retired from entertainment after 2005, she has recently re-emerged into the public spotlight and expressed interest in potential acting projects.

== Life and career ==
=== 1966–1985: Early life ===
Suki Kwan was born on 11 March 1966 in British Hong Kong. Before entering the entertainment industry, she worked as a dance teacher, a detail noted in published profiles of her career trajectory.

=== 1986–1993: TVB Era and Miss Hong Kong Pageant ===
In 1986, Kwan signed as a contract artist with TVB and made her onscreen debut. She competed in the 1987 Miss Hong Kong Pageant but did not reach the final 12. She made her film debut in the 1987 comedy The Romancing Star directed by Wong Jing.

=== 1994–2002:Film career and 2-year break ===
After finishing her TVB contract in 1993, Kwan transitioned to mainly film work, signing with Debao and later China Entertainment Company. She briefly stepped away from acting in 1995 before returning in 1997.

=== 2003–2005: Car crash and retirement ===
In 2003, Kwan was involved in a car crash while intoxicated. After attempting to deceive police by swapping seats with a friend, she was convicted and sentenced to 14 days' detention for obstruction of justice. Kwan said the experience changed her perspective on life and took a year-long break from acting.

Her final film role before retiring was in Wong Jing and Billy Chung's triad film Colour of the Loyalty (2005). She never formally announced her retirement, but did not appear in media or film after 2005, choosing a low-profile lifestyle in Hong Kong.

=== 2006–2023: Post retirement and entrepreneurship ===
After leaving the show business, Kwan maintained a private life and occasionally appeared at social events with former colleagues. She was long reported to be in a relationship with actor Lee Wai Sheung (李煒尚), a former actor turned yoga instructor, whom she quietly married after retiring from entertainment. Their marriage ended in divorce after several years.

During her time away from acting, Kwan invested in business ventures and pursued personal interests while maintaining a low-profile lifestyle.

=== 2024–present: Public resurgence and potential comeback ===
In 2024 and 2025, Kwan began re-emerging publicly. After her divorce was reported, she appeared on television talk shows and engaged with fans via social media.

She has expressed interest in returning to acting and considering film or television projects, although no new roles have yet been confirmed.

== Filmography ==
=== Films ===
- 1987 The Romancing Star – Chu
- 1988 Operation Pink Squad – Shy Grass' partner
- 1989 Operation Pink Squad 2: The Hunted Tower – Policewoman
- Miracles (1989)
- City Cops (1989)
- Love Is Love (1990)
- Heart Into Hearts (1990)
- Ghostly Vixen (1990)
- BB 30 (1990)
- His Fatal Ways (1991)
- Mr. Vampire 1992 (1992)
- Heart Against Hearts (1992)
- The Happy Massage Girls (1992)
- The Tale of a Heroine (1993)
- The Supreme Winner (1993)
- Nobody Ever Cheats (1994)
- Drunken Master II (1994)
- Twist (1995)
- High Risk (1995)
- Passionate Nights (1997)
- Your Place or Mine! (1998)
- A True Mob Story (1998)
- The Victim (1999)
- The Tricky Master (1999)
- Raped by an Angel 4: The Raper's Union (1999)
- Prince Charming (1999)
- Gigolo of Chinese Hollywood (1999)
- Crying Heart (1999)
- Century of the Dragon (1999)
- Sausalito (2000)
- Queen of Kowloon (2000)
- The Blood Rules (2000)
- A Gambler's Story (2001)
- Cop on a Mission (2001)
- The New Option (2002)
- Colour of Loyalty (2005)
