= Josephine Siao =

Hong Kong actress (born 1947)

- 蕭芳芳
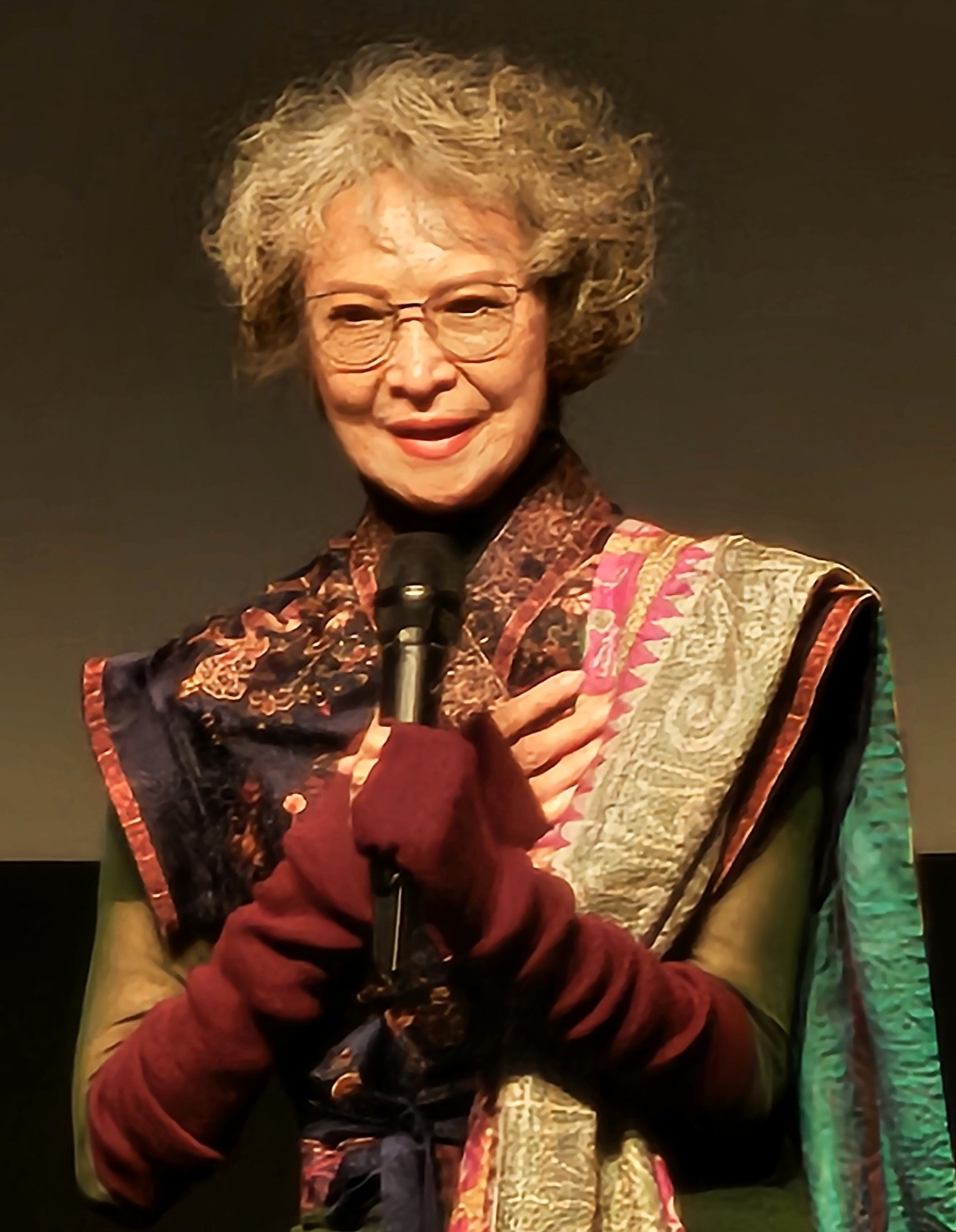
- Siao in 2026
- Born: Siao Loeng (蕭亮); 13 March 1947 (age 79); Shanghai, China
- Education: Seton Hall University, Regis University
- Occupations: Actress; television personality
- Years active: 1954–1997
- Spouses: Charlie Chin (m. 1976; div. 1978) Clarence Chang (m. 1980; died 2022)
- Children: Two
- Parents: Xiao Naizhen (father); Cheng Fenghui (mother)
- Awards: Asia-Pacific Film Festival – Best Child Actor; 1955 The Orphan Girl; Best Actress; 1996 Hu-Du-Men Berlin International Film Festival – Silver Bear for Best Actress; 1996 Summer Snow Hong Kong Film Awards – Best Actress; 1988 The Wrong Couples; 1996 Summer Snow; Lifetime Achievement Award; 2009 Golden Bauhinia Awards – Best Actress; 1996 Summer Snow Hong Kong Film Critics Society Awards – Best Actress; 1995 Summer Snow Asian Film Awards – Outstanding Contribution to Asian Cinema; 2007 Golden Horse Awards – Best Supporting Actress; 1975 Girl Friend; Best Leading Actress; 1995 Summer Snow; 1996 Hu-Du-Men Golden Bell Awards – Best Actress; 1995 Autumn Water & Vast Sky

Chinese name
- Traditional Chinese: 蕭芳芳
- Simplified Chinese: 萧芳芳
Transcriptions
Standard Mandarin
- Hanyu Pinyin: Xiāo Fāngfāng
Yue: Cantonese
- Jyutping: siu1 fong1 fong1
- Musical career
- Also known as: Sister Fong-fong (芳芳姐)
- Origin: British Hong Kong

Josephine Siao Fong-fong MBE (simplified Chinese: 萧芳芳; traditional Chinese: 蕭芳芳; pinyin: Xiāo Fāngfāng; Jyutping: siu1 fong1 fong1; born March 13, 1947) is a Hong Kong film star who became popular as a child actress and continued her success as a mature actress, winning numerous awards including Best Actress at the 45th Berlin International Film Festival (for Summer Snow). Since retiring from show business (partly due to her increasing deafness), she has become a writer and a psychologist, known for her work against child abuse.

Born in Shanghai, Ciao emigrated to Hong Kong at the age of two, and began her acting career at the age of six. In 1955, she appeared alongside Bruce Lee in An Orphan's Tragedy. Her performance in The Orphan Girl (1956) garnered the Best Child Actor Award at the second Southeast Asian Film Festival. Ciao subsequently became one of the biggest teen idols in Hong Kong during the late 1960s, along with frequent co-star Connie Chan Po-chu. The two were often cast in wuxia films and contemporary dramas. Colourful Youth (1966), in which they both appeared, is credited with popularising Cantonese film musicals. Siao briefly retired from acting in 1968 to attend Seton Hall University in the US. After graduating with a bachelor's degree in communications in 1970, she returned to Hong Kong, where she went on to become one of the city's most prolific actresses. In 1982, she starred in Plain Jane to the Rescue, which became one of her most famous roles.

Siao won the Best Actress Award at the Hong Kong Film Awards twice, for The Wrong Couples (1987) and Summer Snow (1995). Her performance in the latter also won her Best Actress at both the Berlinale and the Golden Horse Awards, while Hu-Du-Men (1996) saw her named Best Actress at the Asia-Pacific Film Festival and the Golden Horse Awards. Siao appeared in the critically acclaimed martial arts film Fong Sai-yuk (1993), where she played Miu Tsui-fa, the kung fu–fighting mother of the titular character, portrayed by Jet Li. She reprised her role in Fong Sai-yuk II (1993). Her other memorable martial arts films include Fist of Fury 1991 (1991) and Fist of Fury 1991 II (1992).

== Biography ==
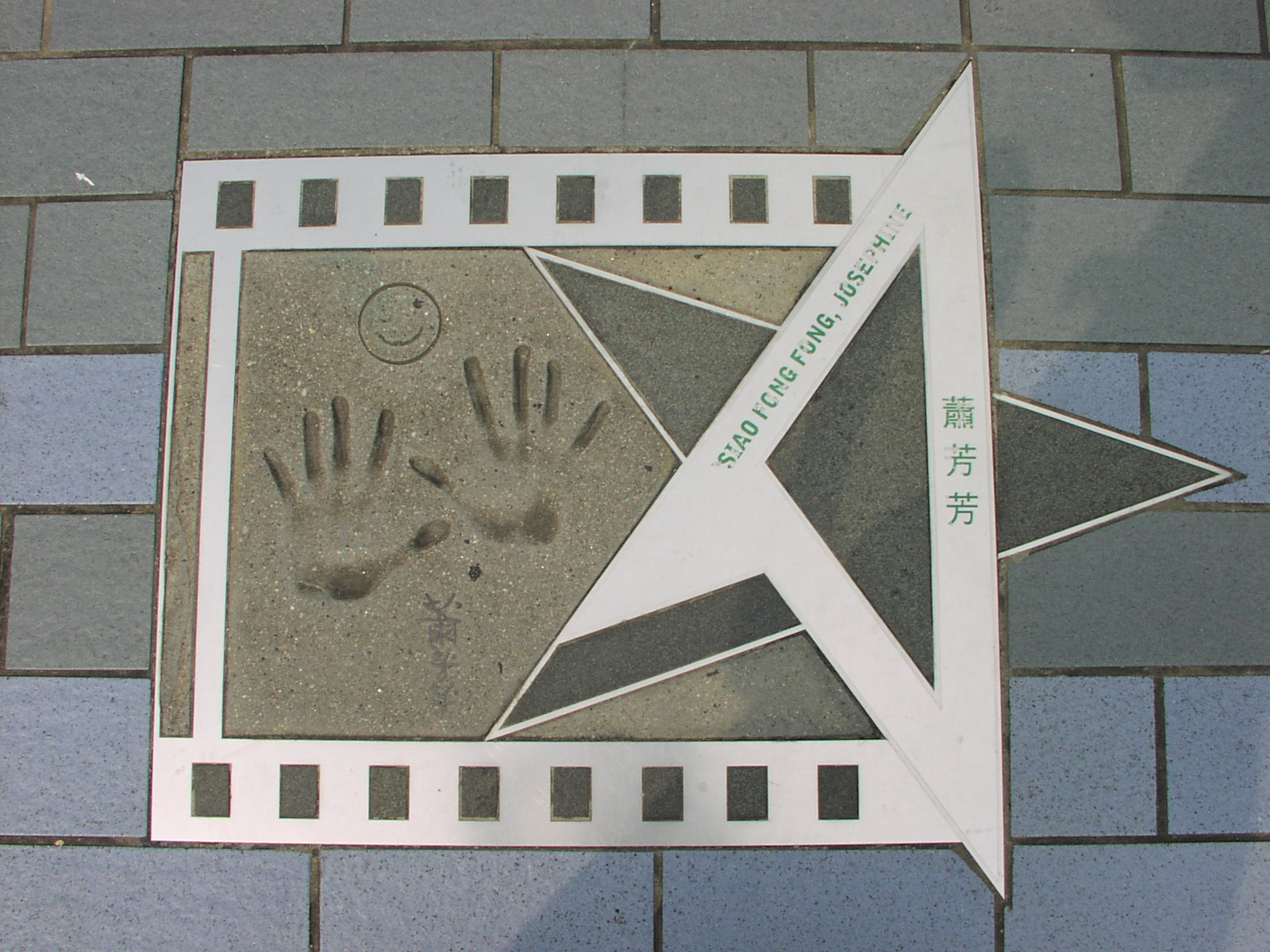
Hand prints of Siao on the Avenue of Stars, Hong Kong

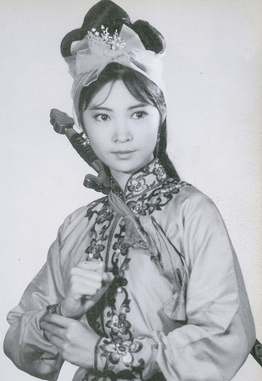
Siao in the 1960s

Siao was born as Siao Liang in Shanghai, with her ancestral home in Luzhi, Suzhou, Jiangsu. At the age of two, she was brought to Hong Kong by her parents.

Soon after her father died, at the age of six (1953), she began to become a child star to solve the family's financial problems. When she was seven years old, she took on the first film and art film Little Star Tears (1954). In 1956, she performed "Aunt Mei" for the Shaw Brothers Company. Her famous work is "The Wandering Children" (1960) and this made her became one of the biggest teen idols in Hong Kong during the late 1960s, along with frequent co-star Connie Chan Po-chu. The two were often cast in wuxia films as disciples of the same master and sometimes—when Connie played the male lead—as young heroes in love. Back in the 1960s, Josephine's and Connie's fans maintained a heated rivalry. News of their fans getting into catfights was not uncommon in those days.

Unlike many child stars, Siao made a successful transition to adult stardom, remaining one of Hong Kong's most prolific and popular actresses. She was also one of the directors (co-directing with Leung Po-Chih, 梁普智) and writers of Jumping Ash (跳灰). This film is regarded as a prelude to the Hong Kong New Wave in the 1980s by film critics.

Having largely missed out on formal education because of her acting career as a child, Siao pursued her studies in later years despite her increasing deafness and the demands of raising a family (she has two daughters by her second husband). During this time she made fewer films, but her output included highly praised work such as her award-winning performance in Summer Snow (1995) as a middle-aged widow trying to cope with her father-in-law's Alzheimer's Disease.

Western fans of martial arts films will probably know her best from the Fong Sai-yuk films made in 1993, in which she played Jet Li's kung fu–fighting mother. (These films were released on Western DVD as The Legend and The Legend II.)

Siao has been retired from show business since 1997 in favour of her work in child psychology. In particular, she is a noted campaigner against child abuse, and founded the End Child Sexual Abuse Foundation, which she now chairs, in 1999. She is also a published author.

Some of the milestones in her life include:

- 1970: Bachelor's degree in Mass Communications and Asian Studies at Seton Hall University
- 1974: won the best actress award at Spain Film Festival and Taiwan Film Festival
- 1990: obtained a master's degree in child psychology from Regis University
- 1995: won the best actress award at the Berlin Film Festival for Summer Snow
- 1996: member of the Most Excellent Order of the British Empire
- 2009: Life Achievement Award of the 28th Hong Kong Film Awards

== Filmography ==
=== Films ===
This is a partial list of films.

- 1954 Tears of a Young Concubine - Hsiao-Yu
- 1955 An Orphan's Tragedy
- 1967 A Sweet Girl
- 1967 Blood Stains The Iron Fist - Ting Wai-Kuen
- 1967 The Blue Bees
- 1967 Diamond Robbery
- 1967 The Flying Red Rose
- 1967 The Golden Cat - Golden Cat
- 1967 Happy Years - Mei-Yuk/Yuk
- 1967 The Horrifying Adventure of a Girl
- 1967 How the Sacred Fire Heroic Winds Defeat the Fire Lotus Array - To Kuen-Yee
- 1967 I Love A-Go-Go - So So
- 1967 Lady in Pink - Kwok Siu-lan
- 1967 The Lady Killer - Wong Fuk-Mui
- 1967 Lau Kam Ding - the Female General
- 1967 Lightning Killer - Fong Ching-Wah
- 1967 Maiden Thief
- 1967 The Professionals - Kam Ngau, Gold Bull
- 1967 Rocambole - Ching Yuk-Chu
- 1967 Romance of a Teenage Girl - Kit-Fong
- 1967 Seven Princesses (Part 1) - Luk Sau-King
- 1967 Seven Princesses (Part 2) - Luk Sau-King
- 1967 Shaky Steps - Lui Suk-Chong
- 1967 The Three Swordsmen
- 1967 You Are the One I Love - Law Oi-Lin
- 1974 Rhythm of the Wave
- 1976 Jumping Ash (1976) (跳灰)
- 1978 Lam Ah Chun (林亞珍)
- 1980 The Spooky Bunch
- 1982 Plain Jane to the Rescue
- 1982 The Perfect Match (佳人有約)
- 1984 A Friend from Inner Space (奸人鬼)
- 1987 The Wrong Couples
- 1991 Fist of Fury 1991
- 1992 Fist of Fury 1991 II
- 1992 Too Happy for Words (兩個女人，一個靚，一個唔靚兩個女人)
- 1993 Fong Sai Yuk
- 1993 Fong Sai-yuk II
- 1993 Always on My Mind (搶錢夫妻)
- 1993 Kin Chan No Cinema Jack (陳健沒有傑克電影院)
- 1995 Summer Snow
- 1996 Hu-Du-Men
- 1996 Mahjong Dragon (麻雀飛龍)

== Bibliography ==
- 洋相 : 英美社交禮儀. OCLC 950437557.

== Legacy ==
The Siao Fong-fong Performing Art Hall was established in 1998 at Shantang Street of Luzhi township in the Siao family's former residence.

Awards and achievements
Preceded by Sylvia Chang for Passion	Hong Kong Film Awards for Best Actress; 1988 for The Wrong Couples	Succeeded by Anita Mui for Rouge
Preceded by Crissy Rock for Ladybird, Ladybird	Silver Bear for Best Actress; 1995 for Summer Snow	Succeeded by Anouk Grinberg for Mon Homme
Preceded by Joan Chen for Red Rose, White Rose	Hong Kong Film Critics Society Awards for Best Actress; 1995 for Summer Snow share with Siqin Gaowa	Succeeded by Maggie Cheung for Comrades: Almost a Love Story
Preceded by Anita Yuen for He's a Woman, She's a Man	Hong Kong Film Awards for Best Actress; 1996 for Summer Snow	Succeeded by Maggie Cheung for Comrades: Almost a Love Story
Preceded by None	Golden Bauhinia Awards for Best Actress; 1996 for Summer Snow	Succeeded by Maggie Cheung for Comrades: Almost a Love Story
Preceded by Raymond Chow	Hong Kong Film Awards Life Achievement Award; 2009	Succeeded by Lau Kar-leung
