= Jeffrey Lau =

Hong Kong filmmaker

- Born: 5 February 1955 (age 71); British Hong Kong
- Occupations: Film director; screenwriter; producer; actor
- Awards: Hong Kong Film Awards – Best Film; 2005 Kung Fu Hustle Hong Kong Film Critics Society Awards – Best Screenplay; 1996 A Chinese Odyssey; Best Film; 2002 Chinese Odyssey 2002

Chinese name
- Traditional Chinese: 劉鎮偉
Transcriptions
Yue: Cantonese
- Jyutping: Lau4 zan3 wai5

Jeffrey Lau Chun-wai (Chinese: 劉鎮偉; born 5 February 1955) is a Hong Kong filmmaker and actor. Lau is famous for writing and directing "mo lei tau" comedies. His comedies include A Chinese Odyssey (with Stephen Chow) and Chinese Odyssey 2002, the latter which was voted Best 2002 Film by the Hong Kong Film Critics Society.

== Filmography ==
=== As director ===
- The Haunted Cop Shop (1987)
- The Haunted Cop Shop II (1988)
- Carry on Hotel (1988)
- Operation Pink Squad (1988)
- Operation Pink Squad II (1989)
- Thunder Cops II (1989)
- Mortuary Blues (1990)
- All for the Winner (1990)
- The Top Bet (1991)
- Saviour of the Soul (1991)
- The Top Bell (1991)
- 92 Legendary La Rose Noire (1992)
- The Eagle Shooting Heroes (1993)
- Days of Tomorrow (1993)
- Treasure Hunt (1994)
- Love and the City (1994)
- A Chinese Odyssey Part One: Pandora's Box (1994)
- A Chinese Odyssey Part Two: Cinderella (1994)
- Out of the Dark (1995)
- Black Rose II (1997)
- Mahjong Dragon (1997)
- Timeless Romance (1998)
- Second Time Around (2002)
- Chinese Odyssey 2002 (2002)
- A Chinese Tall Story (2005)
- Metallic Attraction: Kungfu Cyborg (2009)
- Just Another Pandora's Box (2010)
- The Fantastic Water Babes (2010)
- East Meets West 2011 (2011)
- Just Another Margin (2014)
- Lock Me Up, Tie Him Down (2014)
- A Chinese Odyssey Part Three (2016)
- Soccer Killer (2017)
- A Chinese Odyssey: Love You a Million Years a.k.a. A Chinese Odyssey: Love of Eternity (2017 55-episode TV series)
- Kung Fu League (2018)

=== In other roles ===
- Nomad (1982)
- My Darling, My Goddess (1982)
- Coolie Killer (1982)
- Yellow Peril (1984)
- Hong Kong Butcher (1985)
- Eastern Condors (1987)
- Flaming Brothers (1987)
- Fist of Fury 1991 (1991)
- Lethal Contact (1991)
- Today's Hero (1991)
- Rose Rose I Love You (1993)
- The Bride with White Hair (1993)
- Ashes of Time (1994)
- Fallen Angels (1995)
- Kung Fu Hustle (2004)
