= IFVA =

ifva
- Location: Hong Kong
- Founded: 1995
- Hosted by: Hong Kong Arts Centre
- Language: International
- Website: www.ifva.com

ifva is organised by Hong Kong Arts Centre. Since its establishment in 1995, it has been serving as a platform that promotes and encourages creative talents in Asia, making short films, videos, animation and interactive media. It organizes the "ifva Awards" and "ifva Festival" annually.

The ifva Awards commends talented filmmakers in the field of short films, videos, animation and interactive media. It has five major categories, including 'Open', 'Youth', 'Animation', 'Media Art' and 'Asian New Force', where each category has three awards.

The ifva Festival is held in March every year. It includes the award ceremony of the ifva Awards, live performances and media art exhibitions.

== History ==
The Independent Short Film Competition was first announced by the Urban Council in 1992. The jury panel consisted of Ng Ho, Ann Hui, Allen Fong, Gloria Chan, and Freddie Wong. These awards were presented at the 17th International Hong Kong Film Festival on 8 April 1993.

Simultaneously, the Urban Council provided a grant to the Hong Kong Arts Centre to support their Hong Kong Independent Video Awards, held in association with the Crossover Cultural Institute.

The two competitions were merged as the Independent Short Film and Video Awards in 1995. The name was later changed to "Incubator for Film and Visual Media in Asia".

== ifva Awards ==
The ifva Awards aims to discover and nurture the next currents for local creative industry of moving images, encourage creativity, aesthetics and innovative use of medium and encourage cross-fertilization of creativity, knowledge and experience on media creation among different regions in Asia. There are five categories, 'Open', 'Youth', 'Animation', 'Media Art' and 'Asian New Force'.

== ifva Festival ==
Each year, the ifva Festival features a specific theme and shows films related to the theme.

== See also ==
- Hong Kong Film Archive
- Hong Kong Arts Centre
