= Fist of Fury 1991 =

1991 Hong Kong film by Cho Chung-sing

- Film poster
- Directed by: Cho Chung-sing
- Written by: Jeffrey Lau; Ho Tung
- Produced by: Jeffrey Lau; Corey Yuen
- Starring: Stephen Chow; Kenny Bee; Sharla Cheung; Corey Yuen; Wan Yeung-ming; Shing Fui-On
- Cinematography: Jimmy Leung; Chan Yuen-Kai
- Edited by: Hai Kit-Wai
- Music by: Lowell Lo; Sherman Chow
- Production company: Chun Sing Film
- Distributed by: D&B Film Distribution
- Release date: 23 March 1991 (Hong Kong)
- Running time: 97 minutes
- Country: Hong Kong
- Language: Cantonese
- Box office: HK$24,245,510

Fist of Fury 1991 (新精武門1991) is a 1991 Hong Kong comedy film directed by Cho Chung-sing and starring Stephen Chow in the lead role. Aside from a few parodied scenes, including the dojo fight in which a Japanese man is forced to eat the sign, the film bears no other similarities to the Bruce Lee film Fist of Fury apart from its title. A sequel, Fist of Fury 1991 II, directed by Cho Chung-sing and Corey Yuen, was released the following year.

The opening scene parodies the opening scene in All for the Winner, with the main character (played by Chow in both films) having recently arrived in Hong Kong, encountering the same policeman, and using his special power on a vending machine. The film calls attention to this fact by referring to his character Lau Ching as the "Saint of Gamblers" and having Chow cameo as his other character.

== Synopsis ==
Lau Ching (Chow) is a mainland country boy hoping to earn a living in Hong Kong. Upon reaching the city, he finds his luggage stolen by Smart, a low level thug whom Ching easily takes down with his inhuman right arm. However, Ching loses his hometown friend Ah Keung's address in the ensuing kerfuffle. With nowhere left to go, he forcibly moves into Smart's apartment as his roommate. Together, they fail to make a living through various odd jobs. As a witness to Ching's strength, Smart convinces him to enroll enter a MMA tournament with a $10 million cash prize.

However, the competition requires competitors to be enrolled with a martial arts school, so Ching and Smart enroll with the Chiu Tung school, which in reality is a front for a gang. And as a part of the gang, their first assignment is to ambush Master Fok Wan of the Fok's school. The attack is mostly unsuccessful as Fok's head student, Cheng Wai, and daughter, Fok Man, comes to his rescue. In the ensuing chaos, Ching defects and defends Master Fok from the other thugs. Realizing Ching and Smart are good-in-nature, Master Fok later takes them on as students.

It didn't take Ching and Smart too long to begin earning beautiful Man's affection. As they race to deliver their love letters, Man mistakes Smart's letter as Lau's and obliviously admits to him that she loves him as a brother. Unable to pursue her, Smart decides to play cupid for Ching and Man and facilitate their love letters instead. After spending a few months as Master Fok's student, Ching finally reunites with Ah Keung, albeit as he is stealing from the Fok residence. When questioned, Keung informs Chow that he was not the only thief in the house, as he witnessed another individual sneaking into Man's room. There, they discover Cheng about to rape Man. When Master Fok approaches, Cheng promptly refutes the allegation and accuses Ching of both rape and theft. Framed by the circumstances, Master Fok expels Ching and Smart from the premises. Ching and Smart split shortly after Ching misconstrues Smart's intentions as jealousy.

With nowhere to go, Ah Keung leads Ching to four elderly underground teachers. Ching decided to join the MMA tournament under alias of New Jingwu School. With refined skills and rigorous training, Ching breakthrough the match by overcoming various foes like his former master, Chiu, as the aloof Smart watch his advances secretly.

Master Fok, who had overheard Cheng Wai's confession prior to the match, apologizes to Lau Ching in the semi-finals and gives Ching his blessings if he were to pursue Man. After a long and honorable fight, Ching overcomes his former master. In the locker room, Master Fok disavows Cheng and expels him from the school. Unable to convince Master Fok otherwise, Cheng Wai mercilessly chokes his own master. Weakened by his illness and his fight with Ching, Master Fok is unable to fight back and dies.

Prior to the final match, Cheng claims Master Fok has succumbed to the injuries from the previous battle and challenges Ching to a fight to the death. Ching is unable to fight Cheng under the perceived guilt of having killed his master and relents to Cheng's barrage. In the locker rooms, unable to bear the guilt, one of Cheng Wai's lackeys confesses reveals the truth to Man. However, the other rogue students find out and prevent her from leaving the room. Overhearing the commotion, Smart intervenes and holds back the students as Man makes her to the main stage. When she arrives, Ching is almost beaten to a pulp by Cheng. She then cheers Ching on and clears up Cheng's lies. No longer having to hold back, Ching deals a flurry of punches with his right fist and easily overcomes Cheng, thus winning him the tournament.

Outside the arena, Ching and Man see Smart limping out the stadium's front door with an assortment of injuries. Ching apologizes for having mistaken Smart's actions and they make amends for the sake of their friendship.

== Cast ==
- Stephen Chow as Lau Ching / Saint of Gamblers
- Kenny Bee as Smart
- Sharla Cheung as Mandy Fok
- Corey Yuen as Master Fok Wan
- Wan Yeung-ming as Cheng Wai
- Shing Fui-On as Master Chiu Tung
- Bowie Wu as One of the four brothers
- Bak Man-biu as Bill
- Lee Siu-kei as Boss Hung
- Jeffrey Ching as Tournament official
- Dion Lam as Triad member
- Natalis Chan as Man outside tournament arena (cameo)
- Josephine Siao as Woman outside tournament arena (cameo)
- Ng Man-tat as Saint of Gamblers' assistant (cameo)
- Chen Jing as Brother Leung
- Choh Chung-sing as Man buying newspaper
- Ha Chi-chun as Flutty Ping

== See also ==
- Fist of Fury 1991 II
