= Bowie Wu =

Hong Kong actor

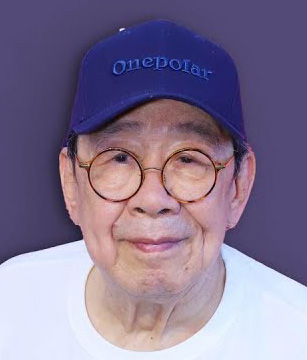
- Wu in 2024
- Born: Wu Gai Sau; 18 January 1932 (age 94); Liwan, Guangzhou, China
- Occupation: Actor
- Years active: 1953–present
- Spouse: Lui Wing Ho (married 1957–2016 (her death))
- Awards: Golden Bauhinia Awards – Lifetime Achievement Award; 2003 TVB Anniversary Awards – Lifetime Achievement Award; 2003 Hong Kong Film Awards – Lifetime Achievement Award; 2023

Chinese name
- Traditional Chinese: 胡楓 胡繼修
- Simplified Chinese: 胡枫 胡继修
Transcriptions
Standard Mandarin
- Hanyu Pinyin: Hù fēng
Yue: Cantonese
- Jyutping: Wu4 fong1
- Musical career
- Also known as: 修哥 (Sau Gor)
- Origin: Hong Kong

Bowie Wu Fung (born 18 January 1932) is a Hong Kong veteran actor and director with family roots in Guangdong, China. A matinée idol in the 1950s and 1960s, he began his acting career in long form Cantonese films 1953, becoming an overnight success with his debut film, Men's Hearts. In his long career he has starred opposite many of Hong Kong cinema's leading ladies, and of particular note are his many collaborations with Josephine Siao in 1960s musicals. For these roles he earned the nickname the "Dance King" for his dancing skills. In the 1970s Woo Fung began working in television and continues to do so as a contract artist to Hong Kong's TVB, with occasional guest appearances in films.

Woo Fung was born at Third Affiliated Hospital of Guangzhou Medical University in Liwan, Guangzhou, He grew up at Xiguan, Guangzhou started in his childhood, He grew up in Hong Kong, His family was antique business from his grandparents, He graduated at Pui Ying Secondary School in 1952.

Woo Fung remains a respected elder in Hong Kong's entertainment industry, and is "godfather" to both Jacky Cheung and Nick Cheung.

Woo Fung held a concert on 19 Jun 2021, at the Hong Kong Coliseum. His granddaughters and great-grandchildren also attended live, with his sons and daughters also joining in via web conferencing.

== Filmography ==
=== Film ===
This is a partial list of films.

- 1953 Men's Hearts
- 1953 Tears for an Absent Love
- 1954 The Supernatural Go In-Between
- 1954 Motherly Love
- 1970 The Young Girl Dares Not Homeward (aka Girl Wanders Around) - Mr. Ho
- 1987 Scared Stiff
- 1987 The Haunted Cop Shop - Chief Shun
- 1988 Operation Pink Squad - Inspector Wu
- 1989 Operation Pink Squad II - Inspector Shin
- 1989 Thunder Cops II - Sao Ko
- 1992 Cageman - Officer Lam Tsung
- 1992 Fist of Fury 1991 II - Ching's trainer
- 1993 Boys Are Easy (Voice actor: Corey Burton, Frank Welker, April Winchell, Bill Farmer, Wayne Allwine
- 1999 The Tricky Master - Brother Tone.
- 2002 Marry a Rich Man - Uncle D
- 2003 Love Undercover 2: Love Mission (Voice actor: Tony Anselmo, Bill Farmer, Tress MacNeille, Russi Taylor, Bret Iwan)
- 2010 72 Tenants of Prosperity - Bookstore owner. (had English voice)
- 2011 Overheard 2 - Sze-ma Cheung (Voice actor: Daniel Ross, Gael García Bernal, Jim Cummings, Rob Paulsen, Tress MacNeille, Bill Farmer, Tony Anselmo, Bret Iwan)

=== Television series ===
(This list is incomplete.)

==== Asia Television Limited ====
- Rise of the Great Wall (1985)

==== TVB ====
- The Final Verdict (1988)
- Looking Back in Anger (1989)
- The Seasons (1989)
- Blood of Good and Evil (1990)
- Drifters (1991)
- One Step beyond (1991)
- Angel's Call (1992)
- The Vampire Returns (1993)
- Forty Something (1995)
- Night Journey (1996)
- Corner the Con Man (1997)
- Justice Sung (1997)
- A Recipe for the Heart (1997)
- Untraceable Evidence (1997)
- Healing Hands (1998)
- Secret of the Heart (1998)
- Game of Deceit (1999)
- Happy Ever After (1999)
- Justice Sung II (1999)
- Healing Hands II (2000)
- The Legendary Four Aces (2000)
- War of the Genders (2000)
- Law Enforcers (2001)
- Reaching Out (2001)
- Screen Play (2001)
- A Case of Misadventure (2002)
- The Trust of a Life Time (2002)
- A Herbalist Affair (2003)
- Life Begins at Forty (2003)
- Riches and Stitches (2003)
- Seed of Hope (2003)
- Virtues of Harmony II (2003–2005)
- The 'W' Files (2003)
- To Catch the Uncatchable (2004)
- Shine On You (2004)
- The Academy (2005)
- Fantasy Hotel (2005)
- The Prince's Shadow (2005)
- At Home With Love (2006)
- The Biter Bitten (2006)
- Maidens' Vow (2006)
- Men in Pain (2006)
- Men Don't Cry (2007)
- Steps (2007)
- Survivor's Law II (2007–2008)
- D.I.E. (2008)
- Born Rich (2009)
- Just Love II (2009)
- A Watchdog's Tale (2009–2010)
- You're Hired (2009)
- Every Move You Make (2010)
- My Better Half (2010)
- Show Me the Happy (2010)
- Forensic Heroes III (2011)
- Men with No Shadows (2011)
- My Sister of Eternal Flower (2011)
- Only You (2011)
- Til Love Do Us Lie (2011–2012)
- Daddy Good Deeds (2012)
- Gloves Come Off (2012)
- The Hippocratic Crush (2012)
- Inbound Troubles (2013)
- Come On, Cousin (2014)
- The Executioner (2014–2015)
- Tiger Cubs II (2014–2015)
- House of Spirits (2016)
- Another Era (2018)
- Legal Mavericks 2020 (2020)
- The Offliners (2020–2021)
- The Forgotten Day (2021)
- Childhood In A Capsule (2022)
- Speakers of Law (2023)

== Awards and nominations ==
Year	Award	Category	Nominated work	Result	Ref.
2023	Hong Kong Film Awards	Lifetime Achievement Award	-	Won	
