= Hong Kong Arts Centre =

Arts organisation and venue in Hong Kong

Coordinates: 22.280236°N 114.170839°E

- Traditional Chinese: 香港藝術中心
- Simplified Chinese: 香港艺术中心
- Jyutping: Hoeng1 gong2 Ngai6 seot6 Zung1 sam1
Transcriptions
Standard Mandarin
- Hanyu Pinyin: Xiānggǎng Yìshù Zhōngxīn
Yue: Cantonese
- Jyutping: Hoeng1 gong2 Ngai6 seot6 Zung1 sam1

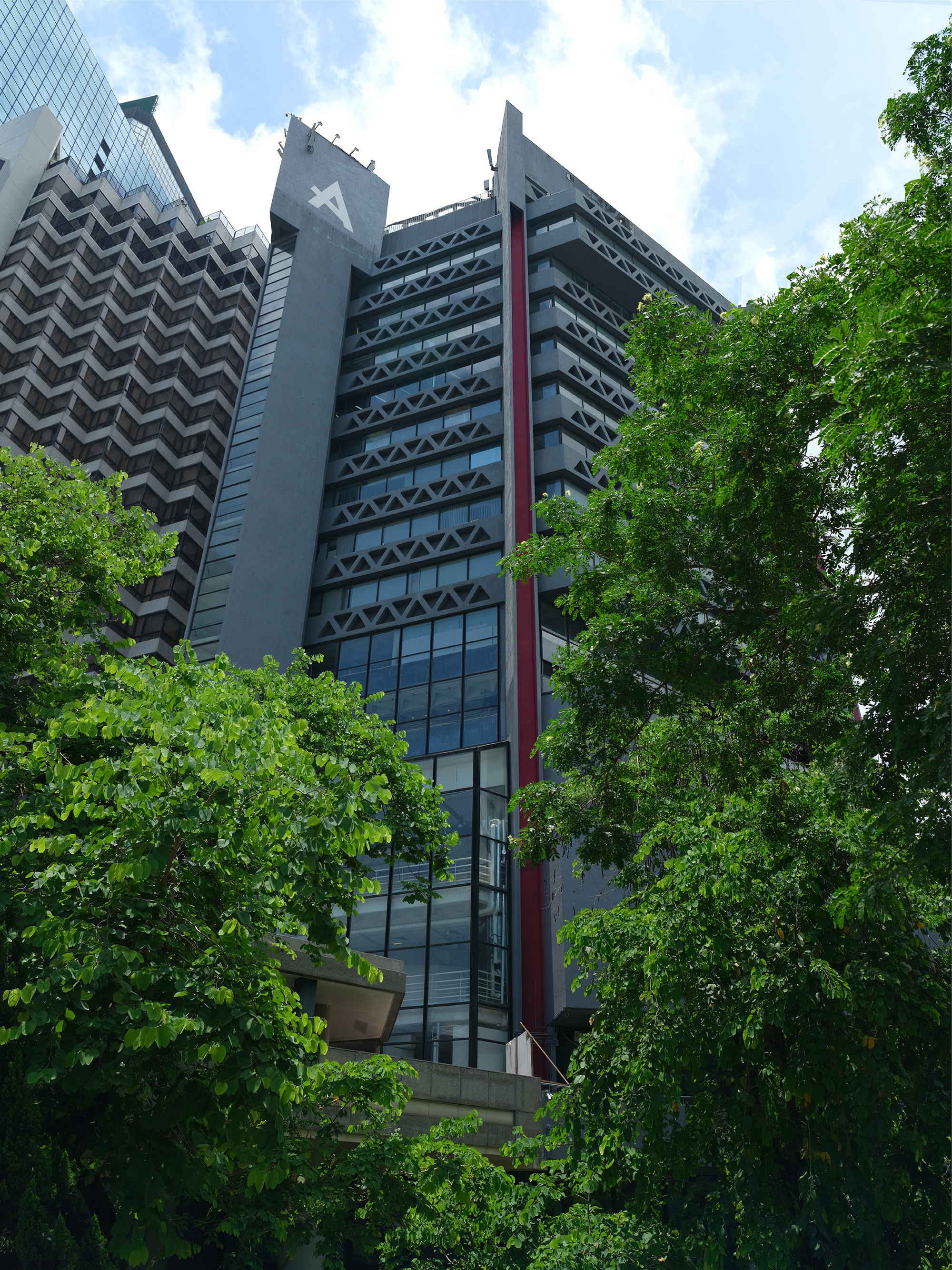
Hong Kong Arts Centre

Hong Kong Arts Centre (HKAC; Chinese: 香港藝術中心) is a non-profit arts institution and art museum established in 1977. It promotes contemporary performing arts, visual arts, film and video arts. It also provides arts education. Its rival is the government-managed Hong Kong Museum of Art. These two museums are considered to be the top two art museums in Hong Kong that dictate the discourse of art in Hong Kong.

The centre comprises presentation spaces and venues including galleries, theatres, a cinema, classrooms, studios, restaurant and offices. It also includes sculpture, photography, ceramics, illustrations, and sound and visual installations.

== History ==
During the late 1960s, the City Hall was the only venue for contemporary arts in Hong Kong. In 1968, local art associations and groups petitioned the Hong Kong government for a piece of land on which to build an arts centre. S. F. Bailey, the secretary general of the University Grants Committee, led the campaign. In June 1971, a piece of reclaimed land near Gloucester Road in Wan Chai was successfully obtained after years of negotiation.

When only half of the required $28 million had been raised, construction was halted and was not resumed until Hong Kong Governor Sir Murray MacLehose facilitated loans using a government warrant. Li Choh-ming, the first vice-chancellor of the Chinese University of Hong Kong, was the first chairman of the Arts Centre, Sir Run Run Shaw was the first vice-chairman, and Neil Duncan was the first general manager.

The Hong Kong Arts Centre was inaugurated by the governor on 14 October 1977.

== Venues ==
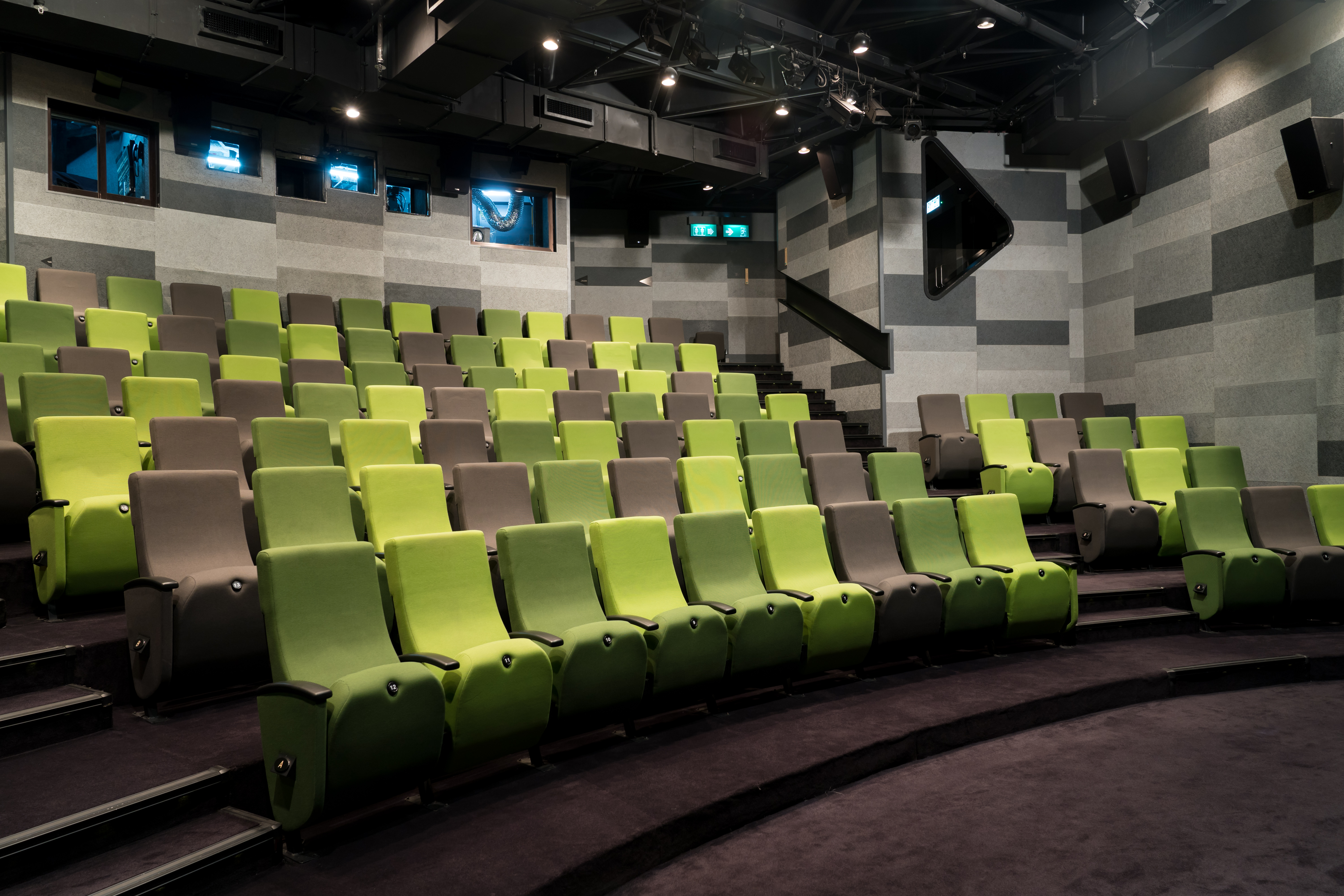
Louis Koo Cinema

- Louis Koo Cinema

The Louis Koo Cinema is equipped for film screenings, and suitable for seminars, recitals, ceremonies and press conferences. The venue's capacity is 119.

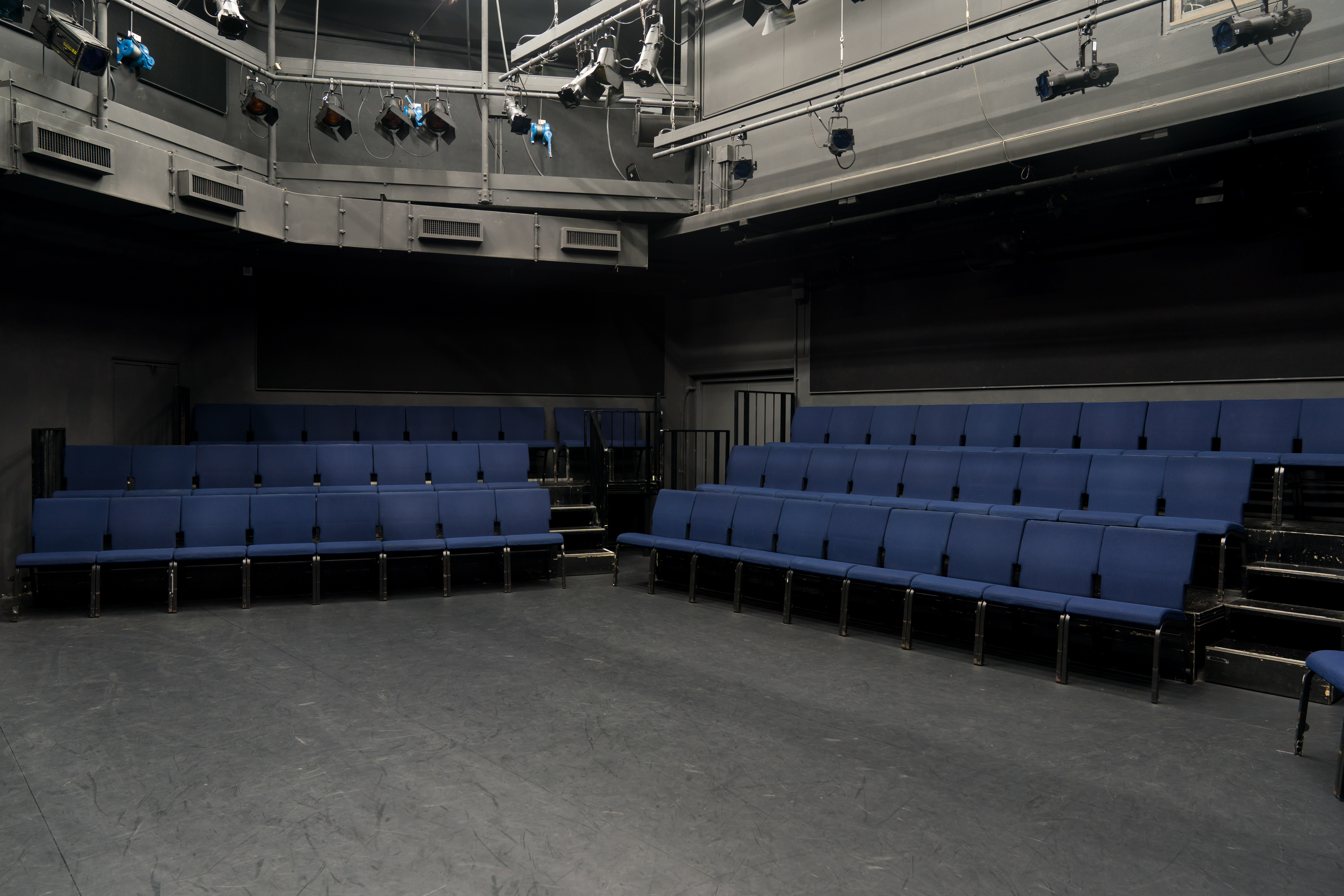
McAulay Studio

- McAulay Studio

The McAulay Studio has movable seating. It is used for small-scale drama performances and workshops. The seating capacity is 76 – 100.

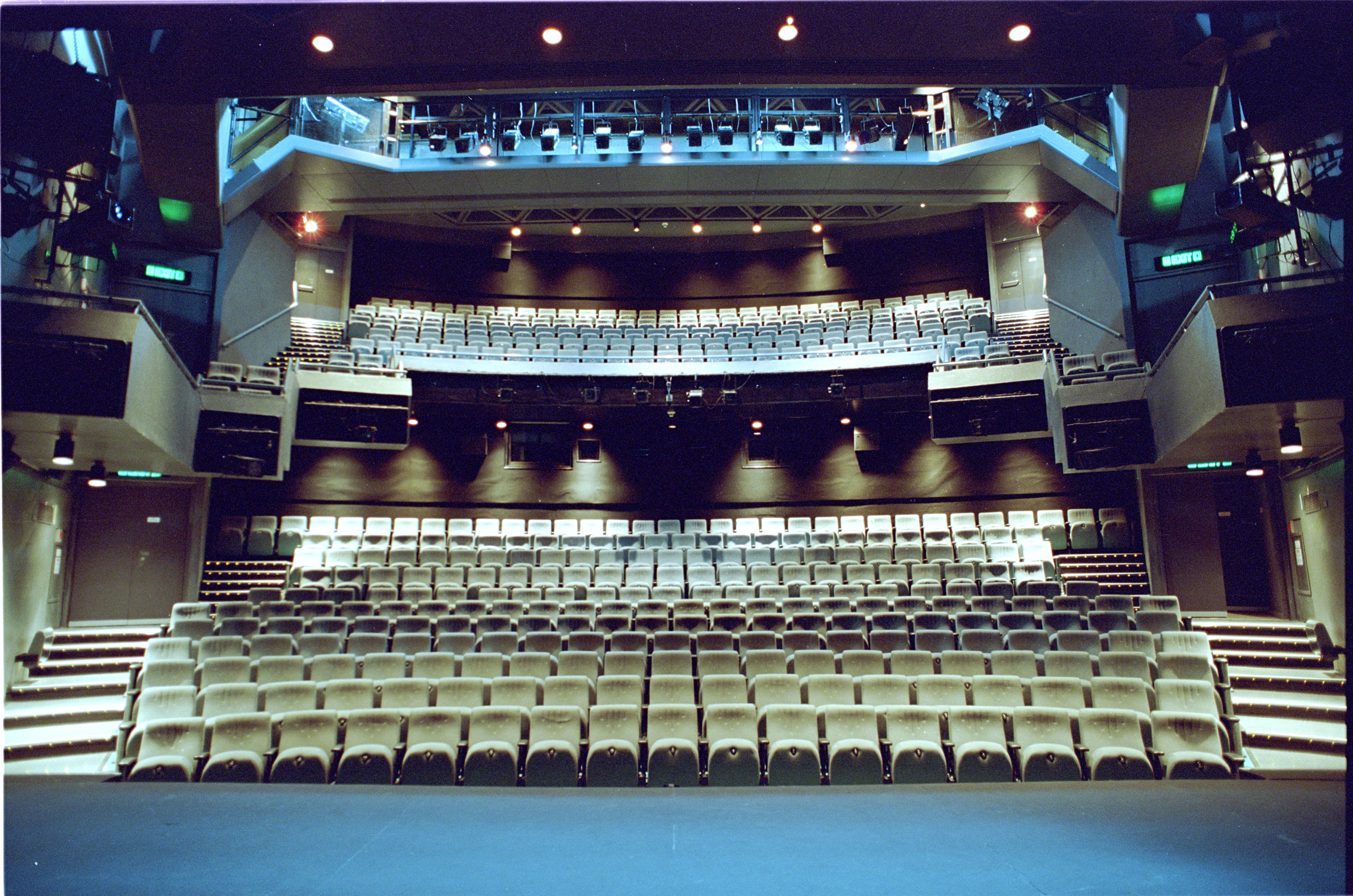
Shouson Theatre

- Shouson Theatre

The Shouson Theatre has seats arranged at the stall and the circle. The venue is used for large-scale drama and dance performances, concerts, film shows and seminars. The seating capacity for drama is 439 (Stall – 260, Circle – 179); for film screenings is 425 (Stall – 246, Circle – 179)

- Goethe Institute

The Goethe Institute is a German Cultural Institute that provides language courses and cultural exhibits.

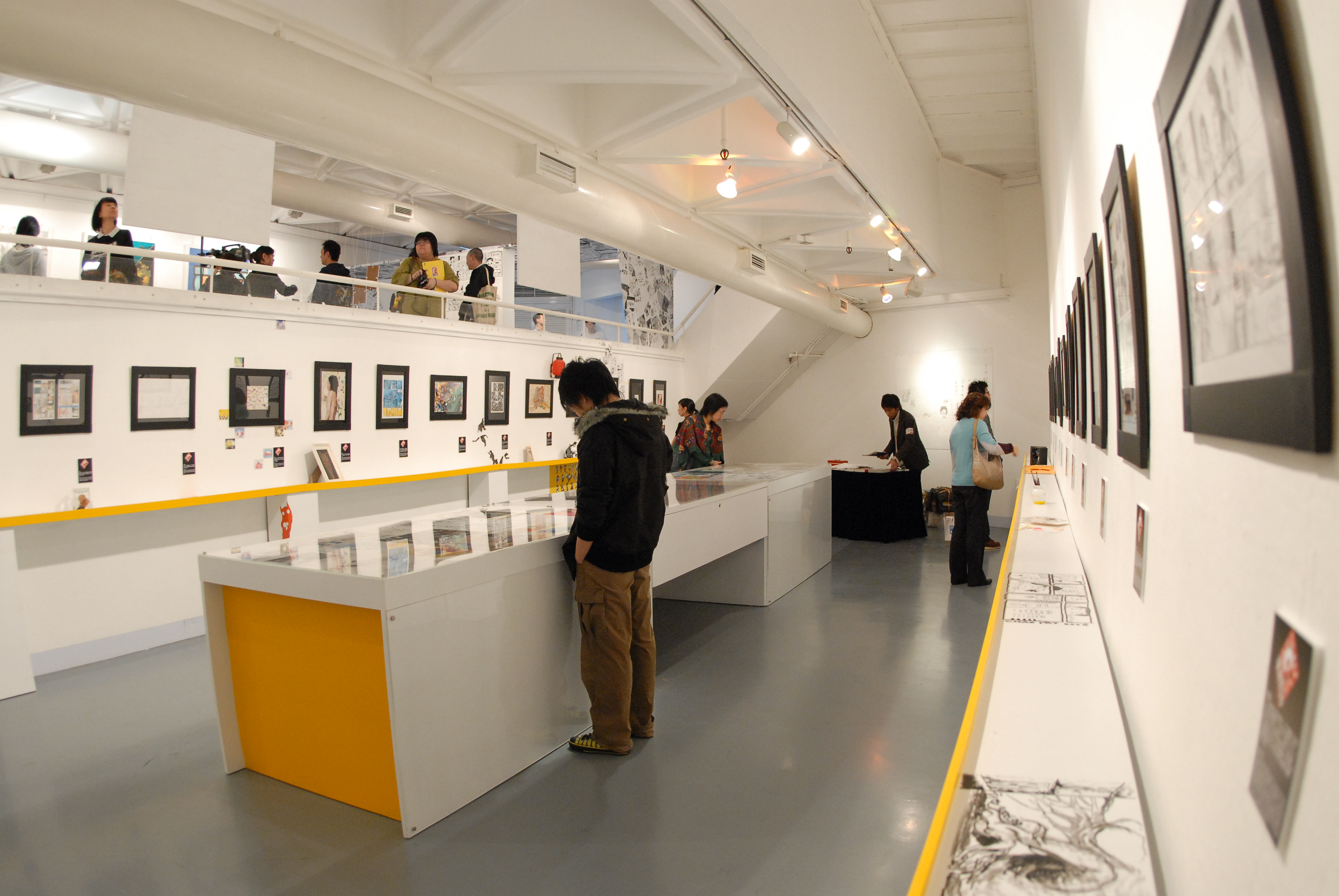
Pao Galleries

- Pao Galleries

The split-level exhibition gallery houses exhibitions of art and crafts all year round.

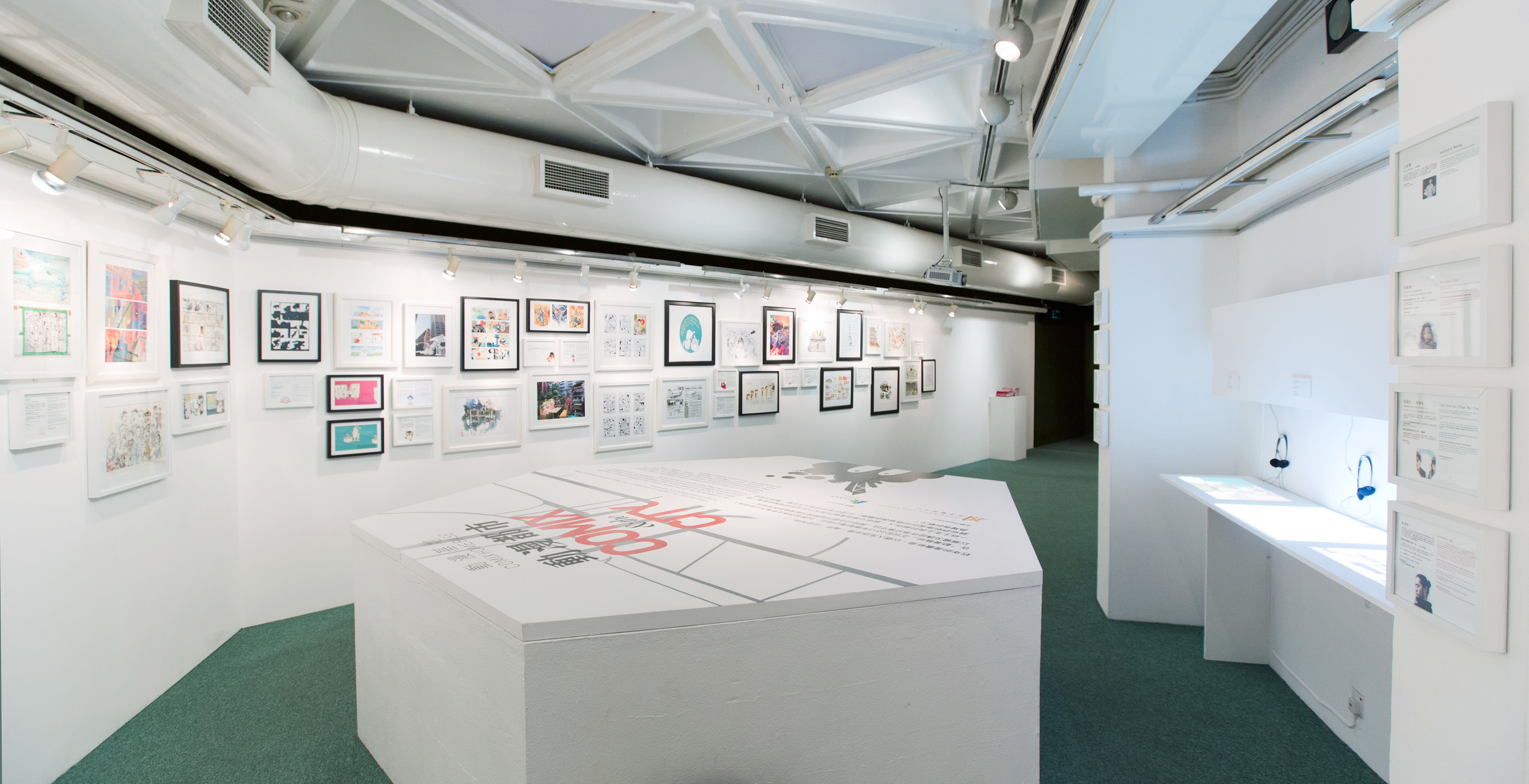
Experimental Gallery

- Experimental Gallery (3/F)

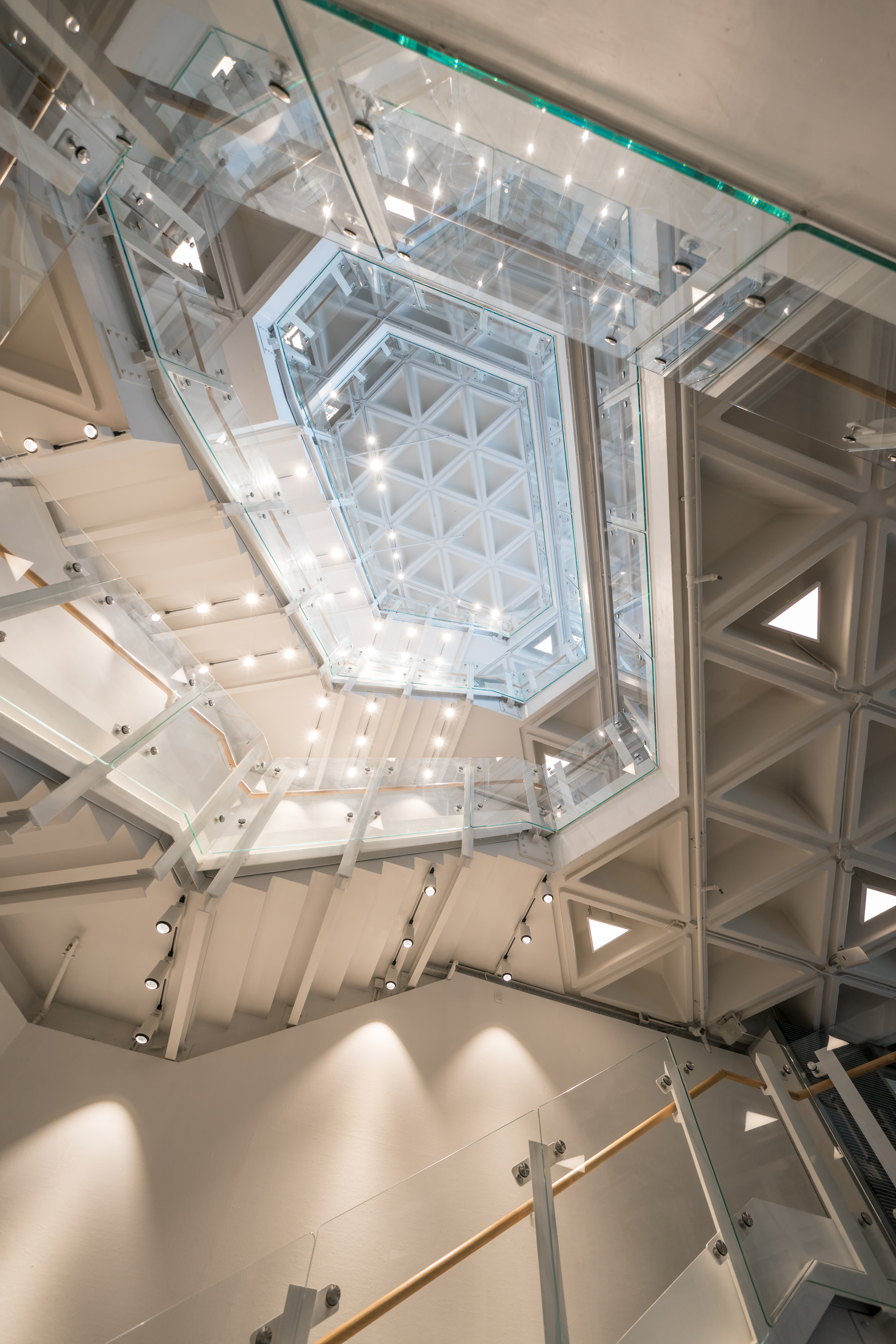
Jockey Club Atrium

- Jockey Club Atrium (G-3/F)
- HKAC Art Shop (G/F)

== Hong Kong Art School ==
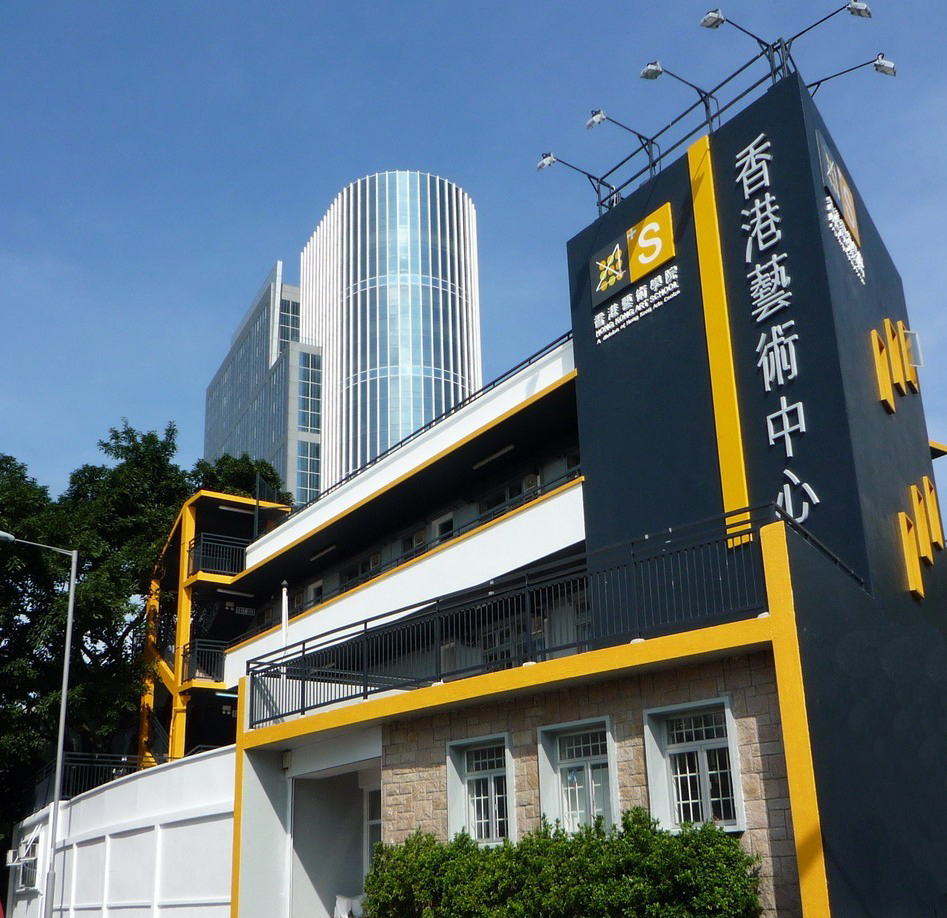
Hong Kong Art School

Hong Kong Art School (香港藝術學院, HKAS) was officially established as a division of the Hong Kong Arts Centre.

The school is an accredited institute. The programmes offered by the school focus on four core academic areas that include Fine Art, Applied Art, Media Art and Drama Education. Its academic levels include Foundation Diploma, Higher Diploma, Bachelor's degree, and master's degree.

It has a campus site in Shau Kei Wan and additional studio space at the Jockey Club Creative Arts Centre in Shek Kip Mei.

== Programmes organized by the Hong Kong Arts Centre ==
- Public Art Hong Kong (PAHK)
- ifva: Incubator for Film and Visual media in Asia
- Street Music Series
- Art of Commercials
- AFI Project 20/20
- A Lean Night
- Community projects e.g. Go Green Competition

== Publication ==
ArtsLink ArtsLink is a publication featuring programmes and activities held at the centre. It is published in the last week of each month. ArtsLink is available for free at more than 150 locations and provides information about exhibition events, film programmes, theatre performances, and courses of the Arts Centre and the Hong Kong Art School.

== Support for other Arts organizations ==
The Arts with the Disabled Association (ADA) Hong Kong

ADA was formed as a non-government organization in 1986. The association provides equal opportunity for persons with disabilities to have access to, participate in and enjoy the arts, and works with the general public to promote integration and inclusion in society through the arts.

Art in Hospitals (AIH)

AIH was established In 1994, under financial, administrative and office rental support of the center, and was registered as a non-profit making charitable organization in 2003.

Aesthetic Education Programme

The programme was founded in 2001 by the Hong Kong Arts Centre's Art School, based on the model of aesthetic education that is practiced at the Lincoln Center Institute (LCI), New York, bringing art to primary and secondary schools.

Theatre Ensemble

Theatre Ensemble uses the centre as the home base for its theatre programmes presentation, it is a pilot scheme launched by HKAC since 2004. The centre also helped the ensemble run an artistic concept “PIP”(Pleasure In Play), conducting drama workshops.

== See also ==
- Hong Kong Academy for Performing Arts
- IFVA
