= Karen Mok discography =

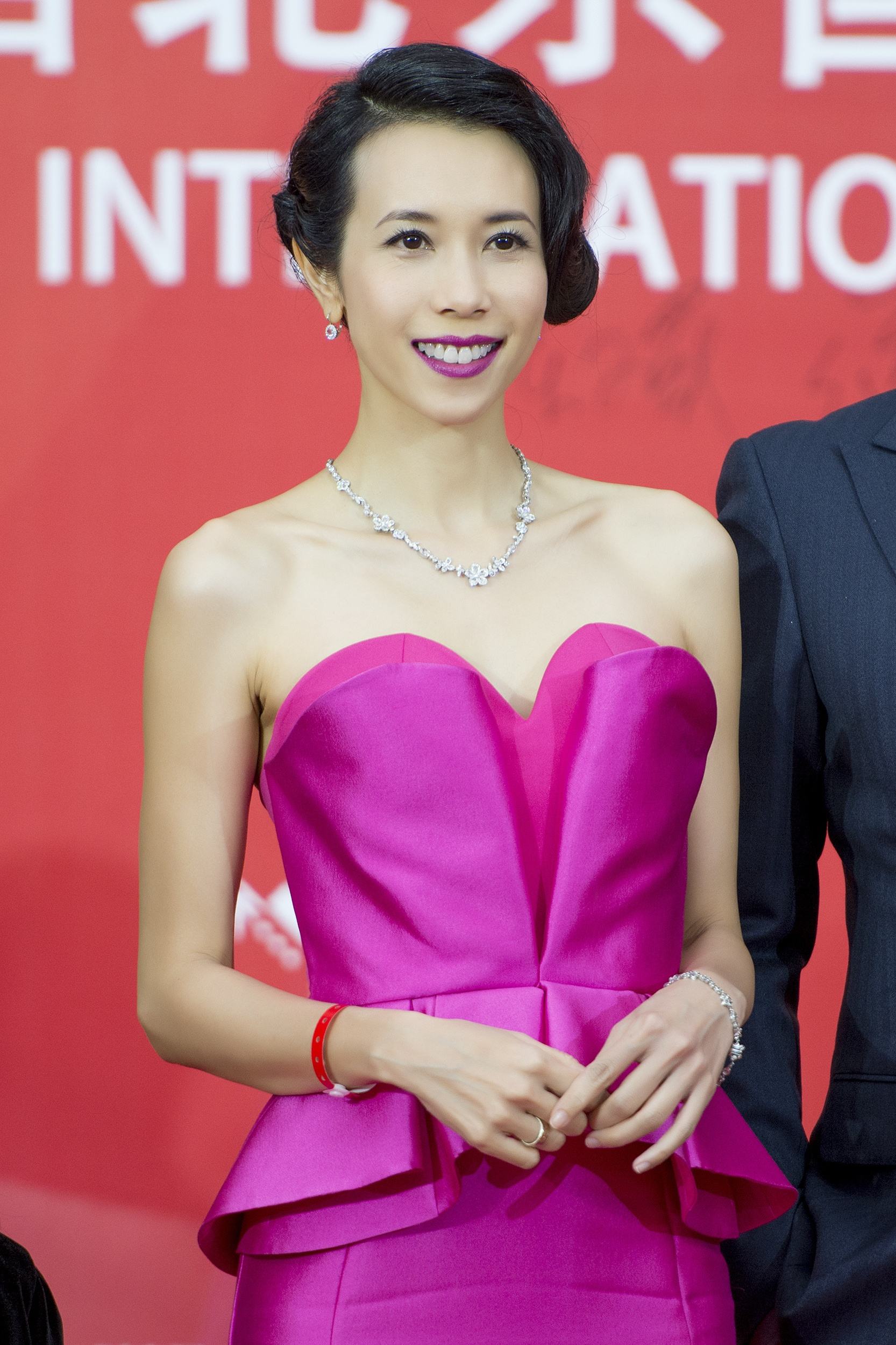
- Mok in 2014
- Studio albums: 18
- EPs: 7
- Compilation albums: 9

The discography of Hong Kong recording artist Karen Mok (Chinese: 莫文蔚) consists of 18 studio albums, including 4 recorded in Cantonese, 13 in Mandarin, and 1 in English. Mok has additionally released 7 extended plays, 9 compilation albums, and 3 soundtrack albums.

== Studio albums ==
=== Mandarin albums ===
Title	Album details	Peak chart positions	Sales
Title	Album details	TWN	Sales
To Be (做自己 )	Released: 21 October 1997; Label: Rock Records; Formats: CD, digital download	2	Asia: 800,000; TWN: 500,000
I Say (我要說)	Released: 2 June 1998; Label: Rock Records; Formats: CD, digital download	2	
You Can (你可以)	Released: 20 April 1999; Label: Rock Records; Formats: CD, digital download	3	
This Is Karen Mok (就是莫文蔚)	Released: 16 December 1999; Label: Rock Records; Formats: CD, digital download	—	
Karen Mok on the Twelfth Floor (十二樓的莫文蔚)	Released: 26 October 2000; Label: Rock Records; Formats: CD, digital download	—	
[i]	Released: 18 April 2002; Label: Sony Music; Formats: CD, digital download	—	
X	Released: 28 August 2003; Label: Sony Music; Formats: CD, digital download	—	Asia: 500,000
Without You (如果沒有你)	Released: 7 April 2006; Label: Sony Music; Formats: CD, digital download	3	
Live is… Karen Mok (拉活...莫文蔚)	Released: 30 November 2007; Label: Sony Music; Formats: CD, digital download	—	
Hui Wei (回蔚)	Released: 23 June 2009; Label: Universal Music; Formats: Digital download, streaming, CD	—	CHN: 2,000,000 (dig.)
Precious (寶貝)	Released: 26 July 2010; Label: Universal Music; Formats: CD, digital download, streaming	—	
Departures (不散, 不見)	Released: 26 December 2014; Label: Universal Music; Formats: CD, digital download, streaming	—	
Half Time (我們在中場相遇)	Released: 31 May 2018; Label: Sony Music Entertainment; Formats: CD, digital download, streaming	—	

=== Cantonese and English albums ===
Title	Album details	Peak chart positions	Sales
Title	Album details	HK	Sales
Karen (同名專輯)	Released: 15 August 1993; Label: Starlight Records; Formats: CD, digital download	—	
Karen Mok in Totality (全身莫文蔚)	Released: 15 October 1996; Label: Rock Records; Formats: CD, digital download	—	Asia: 300,000
Golden Flower (一朵金花)	Released: 16 March 2001; Label: Rock Records; Formats: CD, digital download	—	
Somewhere I Belong	Released: 18 January 2013; Label: Universal Music; Formats: CD, digital download, streaming	7	
The Voyage	Released: 25 May 2021; Label: Sony Music Entertainment; Formats: CD, digital download, streaming	1	

== Compilation albums ==
Title	Album details
莫文蔚NO.1新曲+精選 Karen More	Released: June 2000; Label: Rock Records
戀上莫文蔚 Love Karen	Released: 20 December 2001; Label: Rock Records
莫文蔚 & Friends Karen Mok & Friends	Released: 28 December 2001; Label: Rock Records
含情莫莫 全精選 Greatest Hits	Released: 14 March 2002; Label: Rock Records
就i Karen 莫文蔚精選 I Love Karen Mok Best Collection	Released: 30 June 2008; Label: Sony Music
超級金曲精選 The Ultimate Collection	Released: 12 August 2011; Label: Sony Music
我的.莫文蔚五光十色最精彩選輯 My.Way Best Collection	Released: 10 October 2011; Label: Sony Music
最愛回味 影音典藏精選 Ultimate Karen Mok	Released: 23 March 2012; Label: Sony Music
莫后年代 莫文蔚20週年世紀典藏 The Age of Moknificence 20th Anniversary Compilation	Released: 15 March 2014; Label: Sony Music

== Extended plays ==
Title	Album details	Peak chart positions
Title	Album details	HK
I Love You (我愛你)	Released: 20 March 1998; Label: Rock Records; Formats: CD, digital download	—
Back (回家)	Released: 12 October 1999; Label: Rock Records; Formats: CD, digital download	6
Karen Mok	Released: July 2000; Label: Rock Records; Formats: CD, digital download	5
再生	Released: 11 October 2000; Label: Rock Records; Formats: CD, digital download	—
The Sound of Heaven (天籟)	Released: 12 October 2017; Label: Rock Records; Formats: Digital download, streaming	—
Mok-A-Bye Kitty Trilogy	Released: 29 September 2023; Label: Asia Music Entertainment; Formats: Cassette, digital download, streaming	—

== Singles ==
Title	Year	Language
愛自己 Love Yourself	1997	English / Mandarin / Cantonese
Silently	1998	English
實況轉播 Live Show	1999	Mandarin
密流 Mi Liu	2009	Mandarin
我杯茶 My Cup of Tea – Eason Chan featuring Karen Mok	2010	Cantonese
偷情 Love By Stealth	2012	Cantonese
娘娘駕到 Niang Niang Jia Dao	2013	Mandarin
傾國傾城 The Face That Launched A Thousand Ships	2013	Mandarin
Killing Me Softly With His Song – Sergio Mendes & Karen Mok	2013	English
選擇題 Multiple Choice	2014	Mandarin
看看 Regardez	2014	Mandarin
瑕疵 Defect – Juno Mak & Karen Mok	2015	Cantonese
一念之間 Yi Nian Zhi Jian – Jason Zhang & Karen Mok (Digital single)	2015	Mandarin
當你老了 When You Are Old	2015	Mandarin
Cheek to Cheek – Andrea Bocelli & Karen Mok	2015	English
世間始終你好 You're the Best – Adam Cheng & Karen Mok	2016	Cantonese
Stardust – MIKA & Karen Mok	2016	English
扶搖 Legend of Fuyao	2016	Mandarin
I Do	2017	Mandarin
如初之光 Let There Be Light	2018	Mandarin
慢慢喜歡你 Growing Fond of You	2018	Mandarin
半生緣（我們在這裡相遇） Half a Lifelong Romance: Here Is Where We Meet (Digital single)	2018	Mandarin
可惜了 Ke Xi Le – Chyi Chin & Karen Mok	2018	Mandarin
只是不夠愛 Not Enough Love	2019	Mandarin
呼吸有害 Breathing is Hazardous (Digital single)	2020	Cantonese
Let The Future In – Far East Movement & Karen Mok	2020	Mandarin & English
這世界那麼多人 Empty World	2021	Mandarin
月光光 Moonlight	2023	Mandarin

== Soundtracks ==
Title	Year	Album
"The Way You Make Me Feel"	1999	King of Comedy OST
"So Close"	2002	So Close OST
"Fuyao"	2018	The Legend of Fuyao OST
