= Harbin International Convention Exhibition and Sports Center =

Convention center and sports facility in Harbin, Heilongjiang, China

Harbin International Convention and Exhibition Centre Stadium
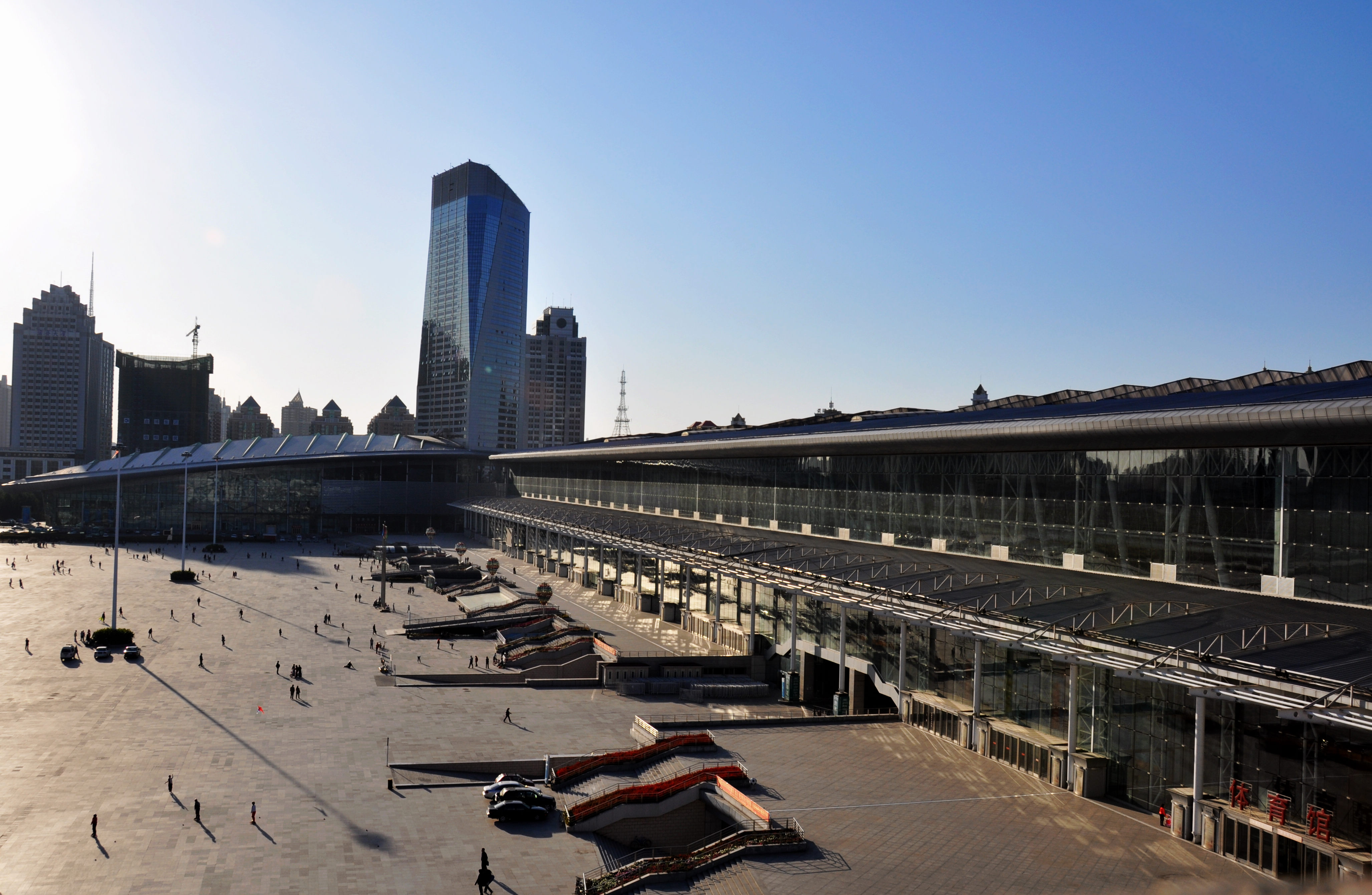
- Harbin International Convention and Exhibition Centre Stadium
- Interactive map of Harbin International Convention and Exhibition Centre Stadium
- Full name: 哈尔滨国际会展中心体育场
- Location: Harbin, China
- Coordinates: 45.752066°N 126.701074°E
- Capacity: 48,000
- Public transit: 3 at Conference and Exhibition Center

Construction
- Opened: 2004

Tenant
- Heilongjiang Ice City

The Harbin International Conference Exhibition and Sports Center (simplified Chinese: 哈尔滨国际会展体育中心; traditional Chinese: 哈爾濱國際會展體育中心; pinyin: Hāěrbīn Guójì Huì Zhǎn Tǐyù Zhōngxīn) is a convention center in Harbin, China with a 48,000-seat multi-purpose stadium known for short as the Harbin ICE Center Stadium. It hosts various conventions and also hosted the 2007 Cup of China figure skating competition. The complex was the main venue of the 2009 Winter Universiade and hosted the 2025 Asian Winter Games. The facility has a floor space of 63,000 square meters (about 700,000 square feet and is home to a 10,603-seated indoor arena.

== Stadium ==
The Harbin International Convention and Exhibition Center Stadium (Chinese: 哈尔滨国际会展体育中心体育场) is a multi-purpose stadium and is the main venue of the convention center. It is currently used mostly for football matches. The stadium has a seating capacity of 48,000 spectators.

Despite being designated as a stadium, its primary use since its completion in 2004 has been to host concerts and automobile trade events; it lacks both a lawn and a synthetic track. On August 17, 2009, the China national football team announced a warm-up match against the Senegal national football team in Harbin on September 19, prompting the city to invest over 6 million RMB in stadium renovations.

On April 1, 2011, Dalian Yiteng Football Club declared their relocation to the Convention and Exhibition Center Stadium in Harbin and rebranding as Harbin Yiteng Football Club. In June 2012, media outlets claimed that the turf of the Harbin Convention and Exhibition Center Stadium had completely deteriorated owing to climatic and maintenance issues, putting Harbin Yiteng at risk of needing to relocate their home stadium. The grass at the Convention Center venue had not grown since the onset of spring, rendering the venue nearly akin to a dirt pitch for prior matches. The game was ultimately deferred, and the stadium expended 800,000 RMB to restore the turf. Notwithstanding the subpar condition of the ground, Harbin Yiteng achieved an unprecedented 15-game home victory streak on the field.

On September 9, 2014, the China national football team and the Jordan national football team competed in a friendly match at the stadium. In 2016, the Heilongjiang Volcanic Mingquan Football Club relocated to the stadium as their home ground and competed in the China Football League B that same year. On November 5, 2017, the Heilongjiang Volcanic Springs soccer team secured the 2017 China Football League B championship with a 3:0 triumph against the Meixian Tiehan Ecological soccer team in the league final held at home.

The Harbin International Convention and Exhibition Sports Center Stadium has also hosted many concerts, including Andy Lau's Vision Tour China (September 25, 2004), Jay Chou's Unparalleled Tour (September 24, 2005), Hak Yau Light Years World Tour (May 25, 2007), Jacky Cheung 1/2 Century Tour (June 26, 2011), and A Classic Tour (July 15, 2017); A-Mei's Ameizing World Tour (September 12, 2011); Karen Mok's The Ultimate Karen Mok Show (August 30, 2019); Joker Xue's Extraterrestrial World Tour (June 10, 2023); JJ Lin's Sanctuary World Tour (June 29, 2019) and JJ20 World Tour (June 23 and June 24, 2024), among others.

== Arena ==
Harbin International Conference Exhibition and Sports Center Arena
- Interactive map of Harbin International Conference Exhibition and Sports Center Arena
- Full name: Harbin International Conference Exhibition and Sports Center Arena
- Location: Harbin, China
- Owner: Heilongjiang Government
- Operator: Heilongjiang Government
- Capacity: 10,603

Construction
- Opened: 2004

Harbin International Conference Exhibition and Sports Center Gymnasium is an indoor sporting arena located at the convention centre. The capacity of the arena is 10,603 spectators. It hosts indoor sporting events such as basketball and volleyball, and also hosted the opening and closing ceremonies of the 2009 Winter Universiade.

=== Exhibition ===
The Harbin International Convention and Exhibition Sports Center comprises four exhibition halls, designated A, B, C, and D, which host a diverse array of exhibitions and events throughout the year.

It has curated the subsequent exhibitions:

- Harbin Automotive Exhibition
- Harbin Cultural Fair
- China-Russia Expo
- Harbin Youth ACG Exhibition
- China Ice ACG Exhibition

== See also ==
- Sports in China
- 2007 Cup of China
- 2009 Winter Universiade
