= Sorrowful Rice =

Hong Kong rice dish created for a 1996 film

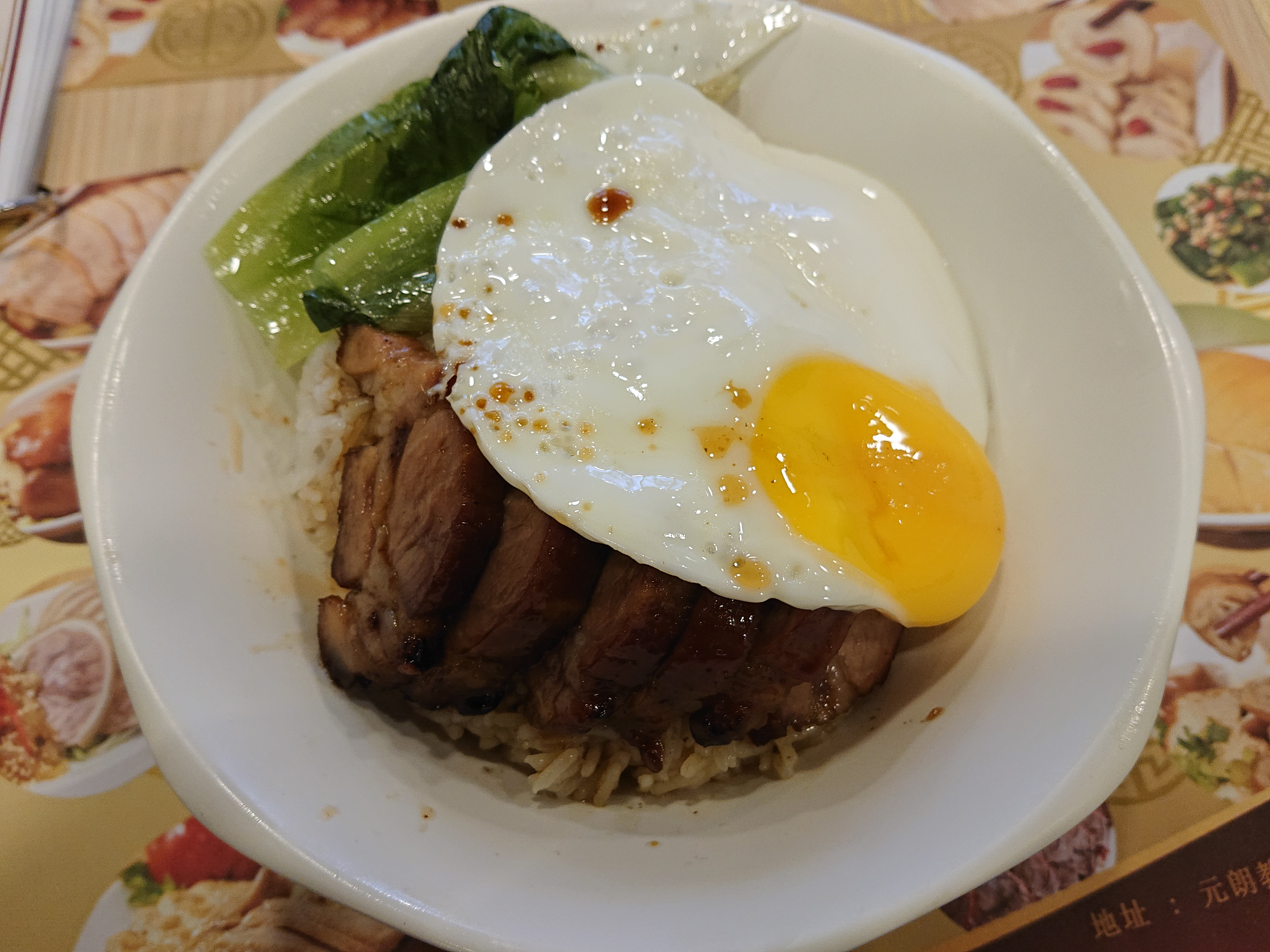
- Alternative names: Char siu egg rice
- Place of origin: Hong Kong
- Created by: Dai Lung
- Main ingredients: Cooked rice, fried egg, char siu,a hint of onion

Sorrowful Rice (Chinese: 黯然銷魂飯; pinyin: ànránxiāohún fàn; Cantonese Yale: gam yin siu wan fan), or simply char siu egg rice, is a Hong Kong rice dish popularised by Stephen Chow's 1996 comedy film The God of Cookery. The dish typically consists of cooked rice, char siu, and a fried egg accompanied by vegetables such as choy sum, and a hint of onion.

== Origins ==
In 1992, the creator of the dish, Dai Lung, was head chef at a Chinese restaurant in Hong Kong frequented by Stephen Chow. After getting to know Lung, Chow expressed interest in making a film about chefs and asked him to create this dish for his film, The God of Cookery. In the film, the protagonist played by Chow creates this simple dish of cooked rice, char siu, and a fried egg, naming it 'Sorrowful Rice'. The dish became popular in Hong Kong in the wake of the film.

== See also ==
- The God of Cookery
