= The Coffin =

2008 Thai-South Korean-Hong Kong film by Ekachai Uekrongtham

- Thai film Poster
- Directed by: Ekachai Uekrongtham
- Produced by: Harrison Kordestani
- Starring: Ananda Everingham; Karen Mok; Florence Faivre; Napakpapha Nakprasitte
- Distributed by: Arclight Films
- Release date: October 30, 2008
- Running time: 90 minutes
- Countries: Thailand; South Korea; Hong Kong
- Languages: Thai; English

The Coffin is a 2008 Thai / South Korean / Hong Kong horror film starring Ananda Everingham and Karen Mok.

== Plot ==
A young man named Chris (Ananda Everingham), and several years later, a woman named Zoe (Karen Mok), undergo a Thai ritual of lying in a coffin, which is supposed to ensure long life and banish bad luck. The ritual is also seen as a solution to diseases like liver cancer. The movie is not continuous as it shows scenes of the past and the present. Chris wakes and is brought to the hospital where doctors say he has hallucinations. Chris has a current girlfriend whom he wants to marry. However, the ex-girlfriend tries to kill the current girlfriend. The woman on the other hand is rid of her lung cancer, however is haunted by her boyfriend, Jack, whom she was supposed to marry. The woman consults an expert in the paranormal, and later Chris, to try to solve her supernatural difficulties.

== Cast ==
- Ananda Everingham – Chris
- Karen Mok – Zoe
- Aki Shibuya – Mariko (Chris's girlfriend)
- Andrew Lin – Zoe's fiancé Jack
- Florence Faivre – Zoe's friend
- Michael Pupart – Professor Thanachai
- Napakpapha Nakprasitte
