= The God of Cookery =

1996 Hong Kong film by Stephen Chow and Lee Lik-chi

- Hong Kong film poster

Chinese name
- Traditional Chinese: 食神
Transcriptions
Standard Mandarin
- Hanyu Pinyin: Shíshén
Yue: Cantonese
- Jyutping: Sik6san4
- Directed by: Stephen Chow; Lee Lik-chi
- Written by: Stephen Chow; Edmond Lo; Tsang Kan-cheong
- Produced by: Yeung Kwok-fai
- Starring: Stephen Chow; Karen Mok; Vincent Kok; Richard Ng
- Cinematography: Jingle Ma
- Edited by: Cheung Ka-Fai
- Music by: Ronald Ng
- Production company: Star Overseas Ltd.
- Distributed by: Universe Entertainment Limited
- Release date: 21 December 1996 (Hong Kong)
- Running time: 92 minutes
- Country: Hong Kong
- Language: Cantonese
- Box office: HK$40,861,655

The God of Cookery
- Chinese: 食神
- Literal meaning: Food God
Transcriptions
Standard Mandarin
- Hanyu Pinyin: Shíshén
Yue: Cantonese
- Yale Romanization: Sik Sàhn
- Jyutping: Sik6san4

The God of Cookery (Chinese: 食神) is a 1996 Hong Kong comedy film which was co-directed by Stephen Chow and Lee Lik-chi. The film features an ensemble cast include Stephen Chow, Karen Mok, Vincent Kok and Richard Ng.

== Synopsis ==
Stephen Chow is a corrupt celebrity chef who runs a successful business empire. Dubbed the "God of Cookery", he humiliates other chefs in a culinary competition where he appears as a judge, despite knowing very little about cooking himself.

Bull Tong, posing as an understudy and conspiring with Chow's business partner, exposes Chow as a fraud and is declared the new "God of Cookery", taking over Chow's empire. Ruined, Chow arrives at Temple Street where he orders a bowl of "assorted noodles" from disfigured food cart vendor Turkey, reveals himself to be the fallen "God of Cookery", and asks her for money. Thugs beat him for his panhandling, but Turkey orders them away, taking pity on Chow and giving him a bowl of barbecue pork on rice, moving Chow to tears.

Turkey and her rival street vendor Goosehead are engaged in gang warfare, both trying to monopolise the sale of beef balls and "pissing" shrimp in the area. Chow unites them by combining the two dishes into "Pissing Beef Balls", which becomes a huge success. The vendors convince Chow to enroll in a culinary school in order to reclaim his lost title, revealing that Turkey still worships him as the "God of Cookery", receiving her scars from fighting a gang member who once insulted a picture of Chow.

The success of "Pissing Beef Balls" alarms Bull, who arranges for Chow to be assassinated. While searching for the school, Chow finds that Turkey has followed him. Turkey asks Chow to complete a drawing of a heart for her to remember him by, but Chow callously rebuffs Turkey, saying he never asked for any of the sacrifices she made for him. As the assassin approaches, Turkey is shot trying to protect Chow, and both are assumed dead.

One month later, Bull enters the "God of Cookery" competition (a parody of Iron Chef) as the heavy favourite to retain his title. Chow arrives at the competition and reveals what had happened: Chow escaped the assassin and found his way to the Shaolin Monastery, where he was nursed back to health by the abbot Wet Dream (a spoof on the Chinese word for nocturnal spermatorrhea). The culinary school Chow had been searching for was in fact the monastery's kitchen, Bull being an escaped monk who had once trained there. The abbot, witnessing Chow's remorse, allowed him to leave the monastery.

Chow and Tong compete by making identical "Buddha Jumping Wall" dishes, each trying to sabotage the other in comedic wuxia fashion. Chow's dish is destroyed by a hidden bomb planted by his former business partner. With little time remaining, Chow prepares a dish of barbecue pork rice, and names it "Sorrowful Rice". Despite it being the better dish, the judge, having been blackmailed, declares Bull the winner. Chow remarks that there is no one "God of Cookery" and that any person who cooks with heart can be the "God of Cookery". In an act of divine intervention, the Imperial Court of Heaven descends upon the competition and reveals that in a previous life, Chow was an assistant to the Kitchen God, before being sent to Earth to live as a human as punishment for revealing culinary secrets to mankind. The deities declare that the Jade Emperor, moved by Chow's penitence, has pardoned him. They then transform Chow's former business partner into a bulldog and perforate Bull's chest with a large hole.

After the competition, Chow reunites with and celebrates Christmas with his vendor friends on Temple Street, where Goosehead reveals that Turkey had in fact survived the assassination. Having caught the bullet meant for Chow with her gold-plated teeth and thereafter received reconstructive surgery, Turkey arrives and asks Chow how she looks. Chow responds by throwing her the completed drawing of two arrow-pierced hearts.

== Cast ==
- Stephen Chow as 'Stephen Chow' (史提芬周 Sitaifan Chow)
- Karen Mok as Turkey (火雞, Fo Gai) / Guanyin
- Vincent Kok as Bull Tong (唐牛, Tong Ngau)
- Ng Man-tat as Uncle
- Lee Siu-Kei as Goosehead (鵝頭, Ngo Tau)
- Tats Lau as Wet Dream (夢遺, Mung Wai)
- Christy Chung as the girl in the dream sequence (cameo)
- Nancy Sit as herself (cameo)
- Lee Kin-yan as the nose-picking transvestite (cameo)
- Law Kar-ying as competition host
- Stephen Au as emcee for Stephen
- Lam Suet as Fat Snow
- Tin Kai-Man as Turkey's gang with green hair
- Kingdom Yuen as Fortune teller (cameo)

== In-film references ==
- The scenes in the Buddhist monastery reference 18 Bronzemen, as the monks call themselves the "18 Brassmen".
- "Sorrowful Rice" (黯然銷魂飯) is a reference to Yang Guo's Melancholic Palms (黯然銷魂掌) technique.
- The final battle between Chow and Bull Tong itself contains a couple of tongue-in-cheek references to Jin Yong's (Louis Cha) The Heaven Sword and Dragon Saber and The Legend of the Condor Heroes in the original Cantonese dialogue, which is however obscured in the English subtitles.

== Canceled Remake ==
In 1998, director and star Stephen Chow planned to remake God of Cookery for English markets with Jim Carrey playing the lead role. The film was being adapted into English by writer Marc Hyman, and film rights were purchased by 20th Century Fox, but the film failed to come to fruition.

== Awards and nominations ==
Awards	Category	Name	Result
34th Golden Horse Awards	Golden Horse Award for Best Leading Actress	Karen Mok	Nominated
16th Hong Kong Film Awards	Hong Kong Film Award for Best Actress	Karen Mok	Nominated

== See also ==
- Chūka Ichiban! (1995 debut), a cooking manga and anime series set in China
- Cook Up a Storm (2017), a Chinese cooking film
- God of Gamblers II (1990), a Stephen Chow gambling film
- God of Gamblers III: Back to Shanghai (1991), a Stephen Chow gambling film
