= The Ultimate Karen Mok Show =

2018–2021 concert tour by Karen Mok

- Tour by Karen Mok
- Associated album: Various
- Start date: 23 June 2018
- End date: 13 June 2021
- No. of shows: 48
- Attendance: 600,000

Karen Mok concert chronology
- Regardez World Tour （2015/2016）; The Ultimate Karen Mok Show （2018–21）; The Big Big Show (2024/2025)

The Ultimate Karen Mok Show (Chinese: 绝色25周年世界巡回演唱会) is the sixth headlining concert tour by Hong Kong singer Karen Mok (莫文蔚). The tour began on 23 June 2018, at the Hongkou Football Stadium in Shanghai, China. It concluded on 13 June 2021, at the Hong Kong Coliseum in Hong Kong.

== Gallery ==
Tour gallery
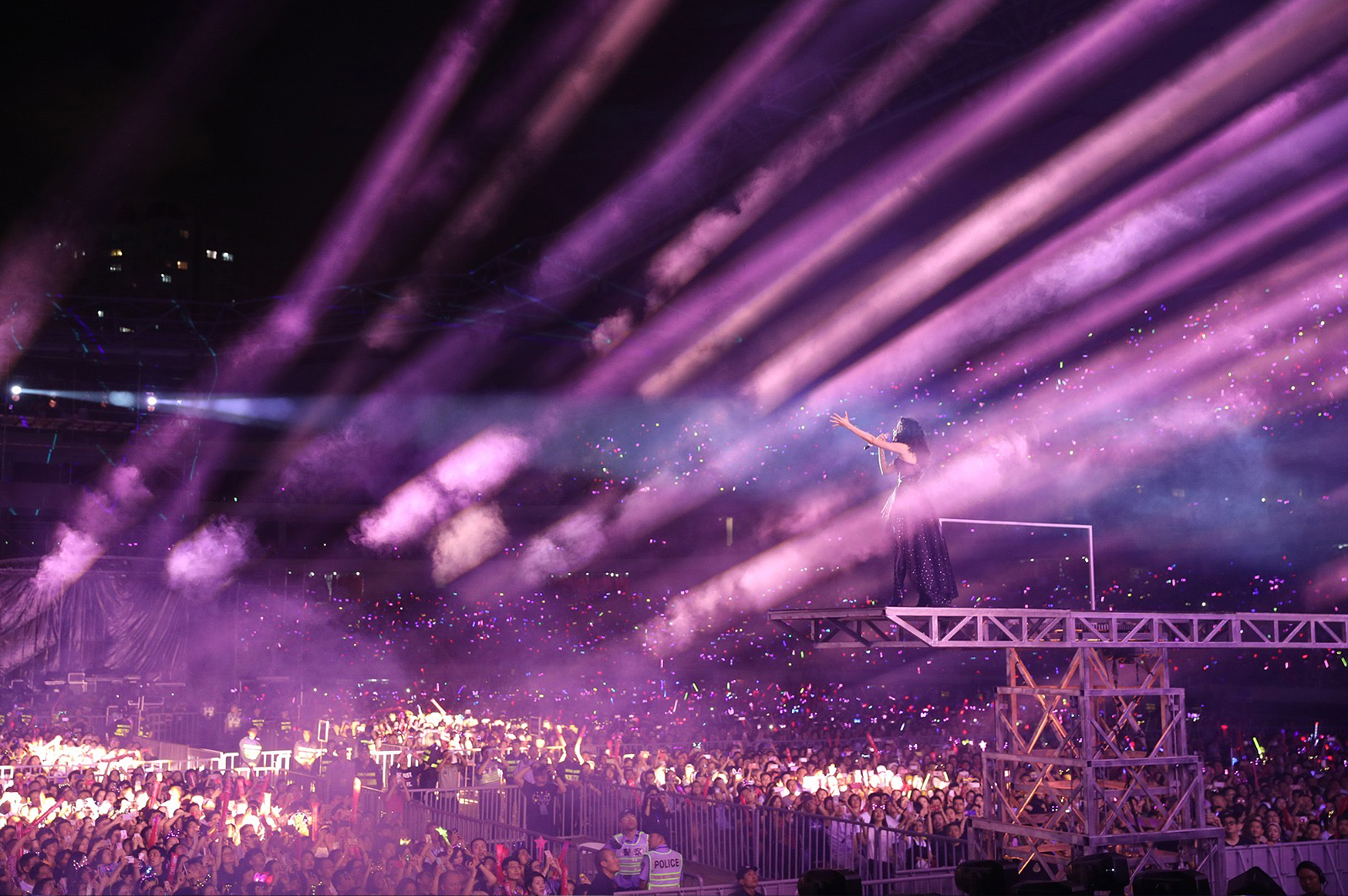
Shanghai concert

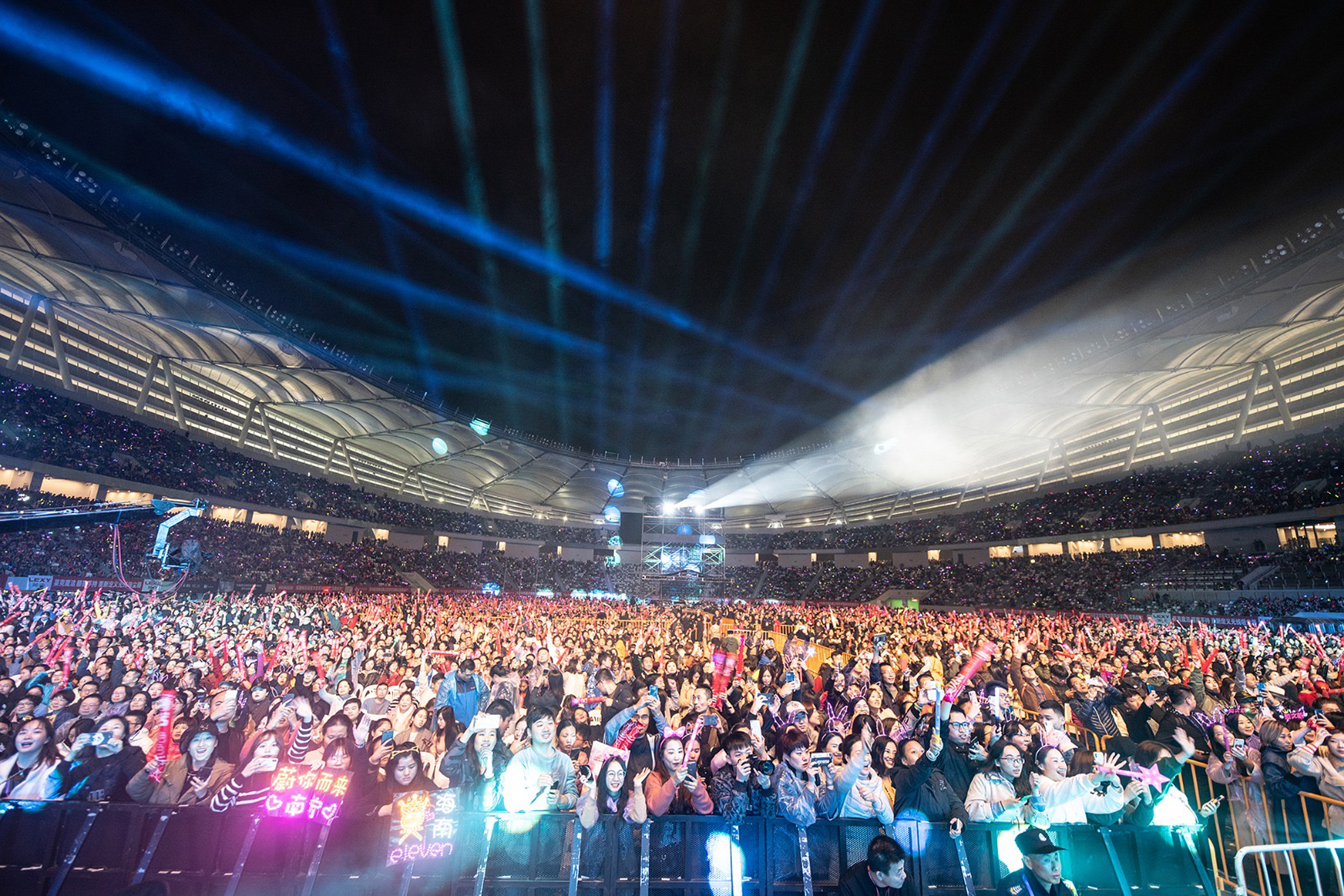
Haikou concert

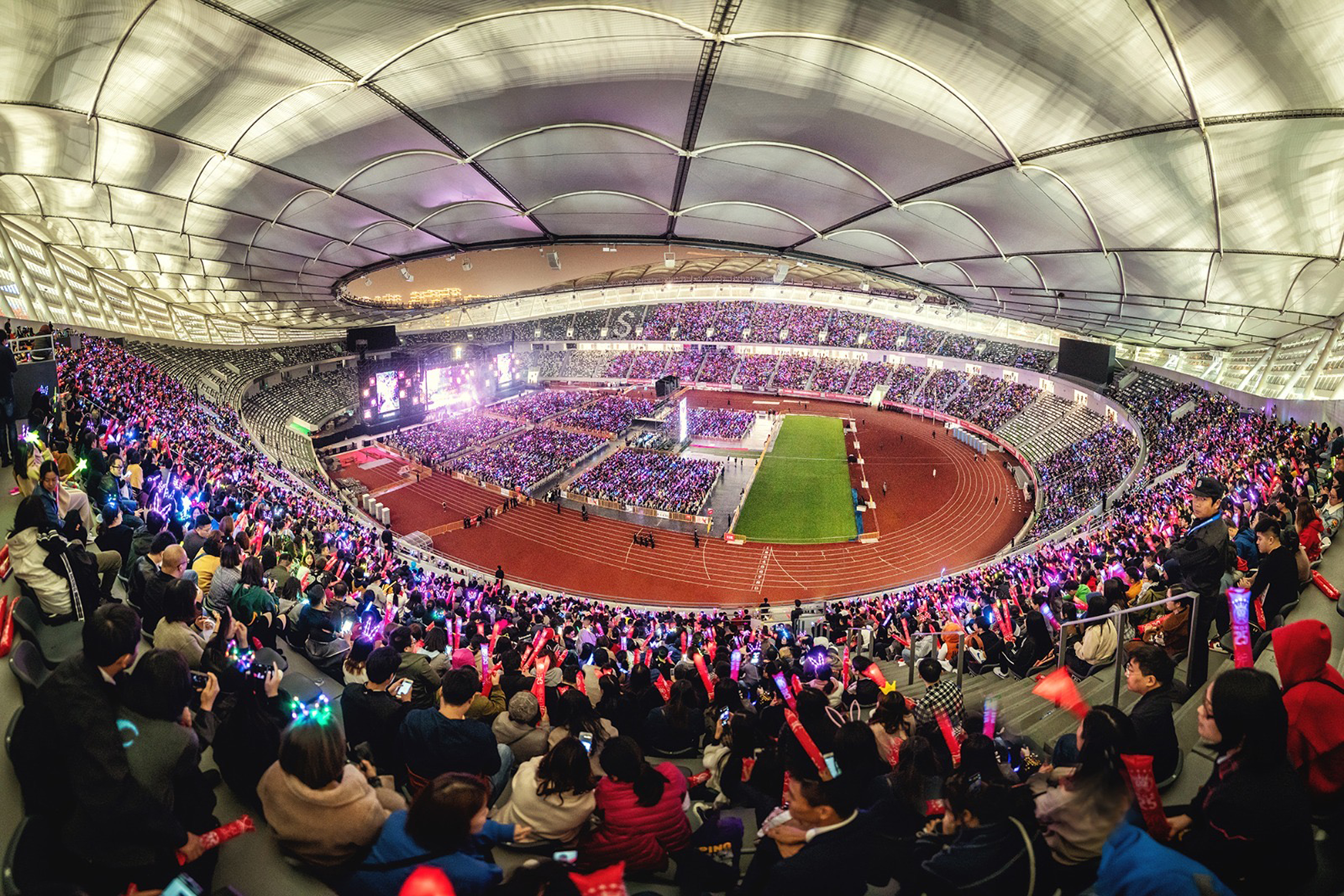
Suzhou concert

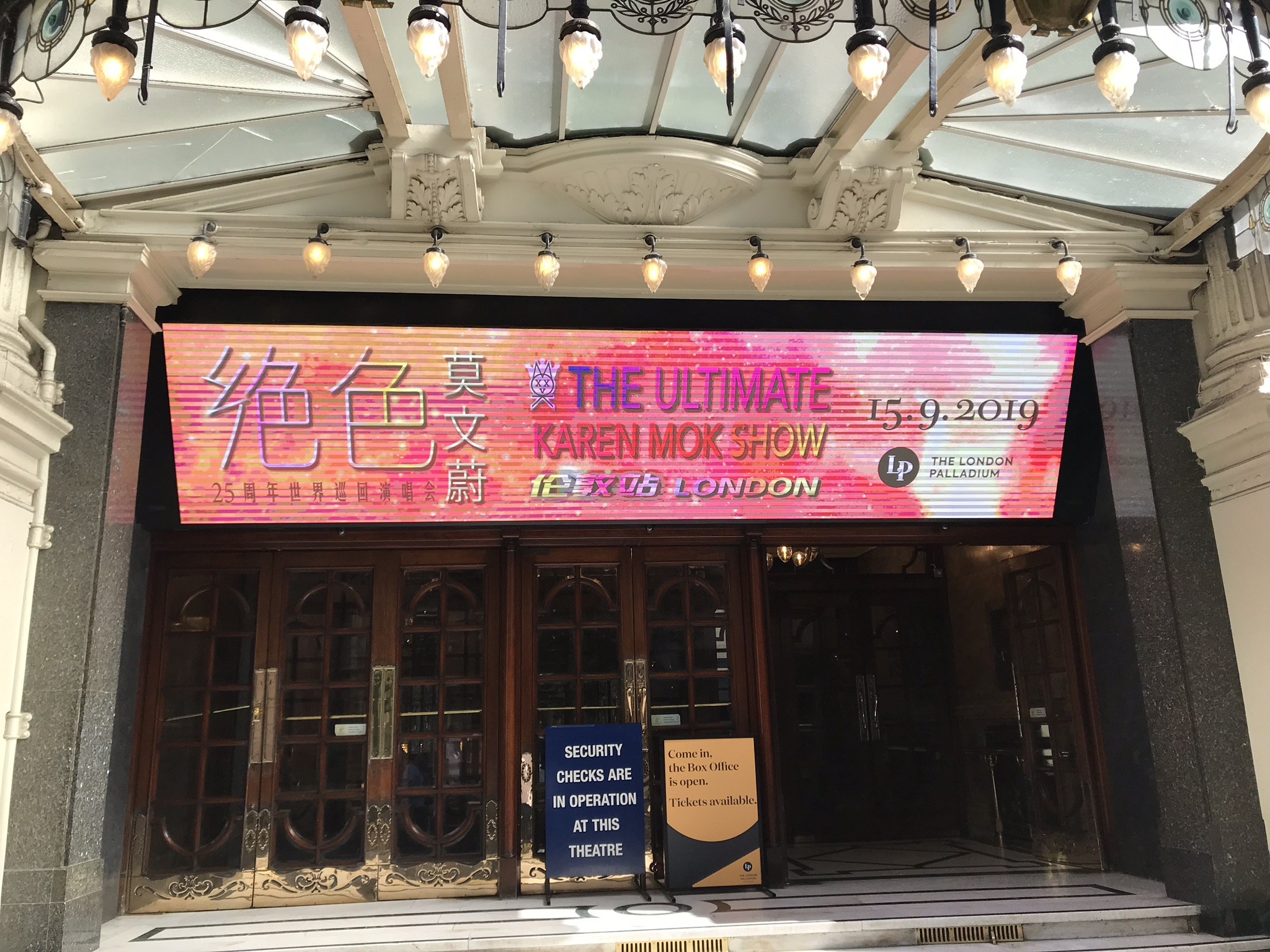
London concert

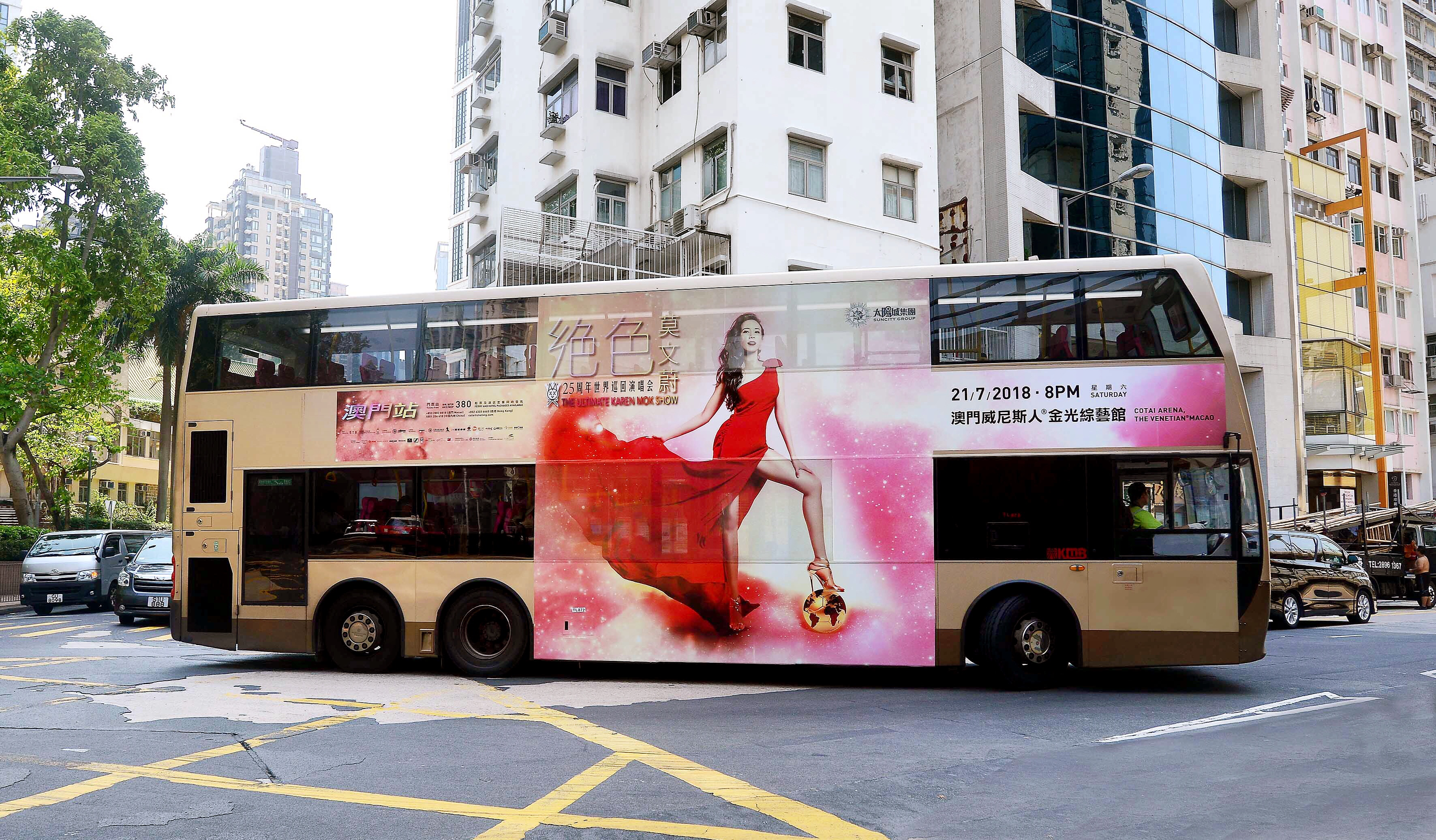
Macau concert poster on a bus in Hong Kong

== Tour dates ==
List of tour dates
Date	City	Country	Venue	Attendance
23 June 2018	Shanghai	China	Hongkou Football Stadium	25,000
7 July 2018	Nanning	China	Guangxi Sports Center	—
14 July 2018	Shenzhen	China	Shenzhen Bay Sports Center	—
21 July 2018	Macau	China	Cotai Arena	—
4 August 2018	Shenyang	China	Tiexi New District Sports Center	—
11 August 2018	Wuhan	China	Optics Valley International Tennis Center	—
25 August 2018	Nanjing	China	Wutaishan Sports Center	20,000
1 September 2018	Changsha	China	Hunan International Convention & Exhibition Center	—
8 September 2018	Guiyang	China	Guiyang Olympic Sports Center	—
22 September 2018	Beijing	China	Workers' Stadium	40,000
27 October 2018	Chongqing	China	Chongqing International Expo Center	—
3 November 2018	Dalian	China	Dalian Sports Centre Stadium	—
10 November 2018	Suzhou	China	Suzhou Olympic Sports Centre	—
24 November 2018	Quanzhou	China	Quanzhou Sports Center	—
1 December 2018	Chengdu	China	Wuliangye Chengdu Performing Arts Center	—
22 December 2018	Taipei	Taiwan	Taipei Arena	—
30 March 2019	Tianjin	China	Tianjin Arena	—
6 April 2019	Qingdao	China	Conson Stadium	—
27 April 2019	Haikou	China	Wuyuan River Stadium	30,000
4 May 2019	Lanzhou	China	Anning Central Business District	—
11 May 2019	Guangzhou	China	Haixinsha Asian Games Park	—
25 May 2019	Changzhou	China	Changzhou Olympic Sports Center	—
1 June 2019	Hangzhou	China	Yellow Dragon Sports Center Stadium	30,000
15 June 2019	Singapore		Singapore Indoor Stadium	—
13 July 2019	Ningbo	China	Ningbo Sports Center	—
20 July 2019	Fuzhou	China	Haixia Olympic Center	—
3 August 2019	Hefei	China	Hefei Olympic Sports Center	25,000
17 August 2019	Linyi	China	Linyi University Stadium	—
24 August 2019	Enshi	China	Enshi Sports Center Stadium	—
30 August 2019	Harbin	China	HICEC Stadium	—
12 September 2019	Paris	France	Folies Bergère	—
15 September 2019	London	England	London Palladium	—
3 October 2019	Tokyo	Japan	Tokyo Dome City Hall	—
12 October 2019	Lhasa	China	Lhasa Mass Culture and Sports Center	10,000
19 October 2019	Xianyang	China	Xianyang Olympic Sports Centre Stadium	37,000
27 October 2019	Sydney	Australia	Star City Casino	—
16 November 2019	Jiaxing	China	Jiaxing Stadium	—
24 November 2019	Beijing	China	Cadillac Center	—
30 November 2019	Kuala Lumpur	Malaysia	Axiata Arena	10,000
7 December 2019	Taipei	Taiwan	Taipei Arena	—
8 December 2019	Taipei	Taiwan	Taipei Arena	—
14 December 2019	Jinhua	China	Jinhua Stadium	—
21 December 2019	Shanghai	China	Mercedes-Benz Arena	—
22 December 2019	Shanghai	China	Mercedes-Benz Arena	—
31 December 2019	Kunming	China	New Asia Sports City	—
11 June 2021	Hong Kong	China	Hong Kong Coliseum	—
12 June 2021	Hong Kong	China	Hong Kong Coliseum	—
13 June 2021	Hong Kong	China	Hong Kong Coliseum	—
Total				N/A

== Accolades ==
Year	Ceremony	Category	Result	Ref.
2019	Music Pioneer Awards	Most Influential Concert – Asia Pacific	Won	
2019	Guinness World Records	Highest Altitude Mass-Attended Music Concert with over 10,000 people - The Lhasa concert	Won	
