= Wait 'til You're Older =

2005 Hong Kong film by Teddy Chan

- Film poster
- Traditional Chinese: 童夢奇緣
- Simplified Chinese: 童梦奇缘
- Hanyu Pinyin: Tóng Mèng Qí Yuán
- Jyutping: Tung4 Mung6 Kei4 Jyun4
- Directed by: Teddy Chan
- Written by: Cheung Chi-kwong; Susan Chan
- Produced by: Teddy Chan; Cheung Chi-kwong
- Starring: Andy Lau; Karen Mok; Felix Wong; Cherrie Ying; Gordon Lam
- Cinematography: Anthony Pun
- Edited by: Kwong Chi-leung
- Music by: Peter Kam
- Production companies: Media Asia Films; Sil-Metropole Organisation; Sum-Wood Productions
- Distributed by: Media Asia Distribution
- Release date: 29 September 2005 (Hong Kong)
- Running time: 89 minutes
- Country: Hong Kong
- Language: Cantonese
- Box office: US$2,577,734 (Hong Kong)

Wait 'til You're Older (traditional Chinese: 童夢奇緣; simplified Chinese: 童梦奇缘) is a 2005 Hong Kong fantasy comedy-drama film produced and directed by Teddy Chan and starring Andy Lau.

== Plot ==
Chan Chi-kwong (Howard Sit) is a young boy who lives with his father (Felix Wong) and stepmother (Karen Mok). He blames his stepmother for the suicide of his mother 3 years earlier and continually runs away from home. One day, while walking to school, he meets an eccentric old man (Feng Xiaogang) in the park who accidentally pours a magic potion he has created down a drain. The next day, a huge tree has grown from a seedling in the drain. Kwong goes to the man's house and steals the potion, falling and breaking it as he tries to run away. Some of the potion enters a cut in his hand, and the next day he wakes up to find he has grown to the age of 20 overnight. Kwong (Andy Lau) is thrilled that he has become an adult and is able to finally run away from home without being recognized. As he gets older each day, he learns more about being an adult and about the situations of those around him.

== Cast ==
- Andy Lau as Chan Chi-kwong
  - Howard Sit as Young Chan Chi-kwong
- Karen Mok as Tsui Mun
- Felix Wong as Chan Man
- Cherrie Ying as Miss Lee
- Gordon Lam as Vice Principal as Chow
- Chim Pui-ho as Bear
- Jacky Wong as Billy
- Feng Xiaogang as Bum, the drifter (special appearance)
- Li Bingbing as Kwong's mum (guest appearance)
- Chapman To as Policeman (guest appearance)
- Kristal Tin as Policewoman (guest appearance)
- Nicola Cheung as Miss Wong (guest appearance)
- Simon So as Jack, the basketball team captain
- Joe Cheung as Joe
- Lee Yee-man as Beer lady

== Awards and nominations ==
Awards and nominations
Ceremony	Category	Recipient	Outcome
12th Hong Kong Film Critics Society Award	Best Actress	Karen Mok	Nominated
25th Hong Kong Film Awards	Best Actress	Karen Mok	Nominated
25th Hong Kong Film Awards	Best Actor	Andy Lau	Nominated
25th Hong Kong Film Awards	Best Original Film Song	Song: Won't Dare to Next Time (下次不敢); Composer: Peter Kam; Lyricist / Singer: Andy Lau	Nominated
25th Hong Kong Film Awards	Best Screenplay	Cheung Chi-kwong, Susan Chan	Nominated
11th Golden Bauhinia Awards	Best Screenplay	Cheung Chi-kwong, Susan Chan	Nominated
11th Golden Bauhinia Awards	Best Actor	Andy Lau	Nominated
11th Golden Bauhinia Awards	Most Popular Actor	Andy Lau	Won
11th Golden Bauhinia Awards	Top Ten Chinese-language films		Won

== See also ==
- Big, a 1988 fantasy-comedy film about a boy who makes a wish "to be big".
