= Karen Mok =

Hong Kong singer

- 莫文蔚
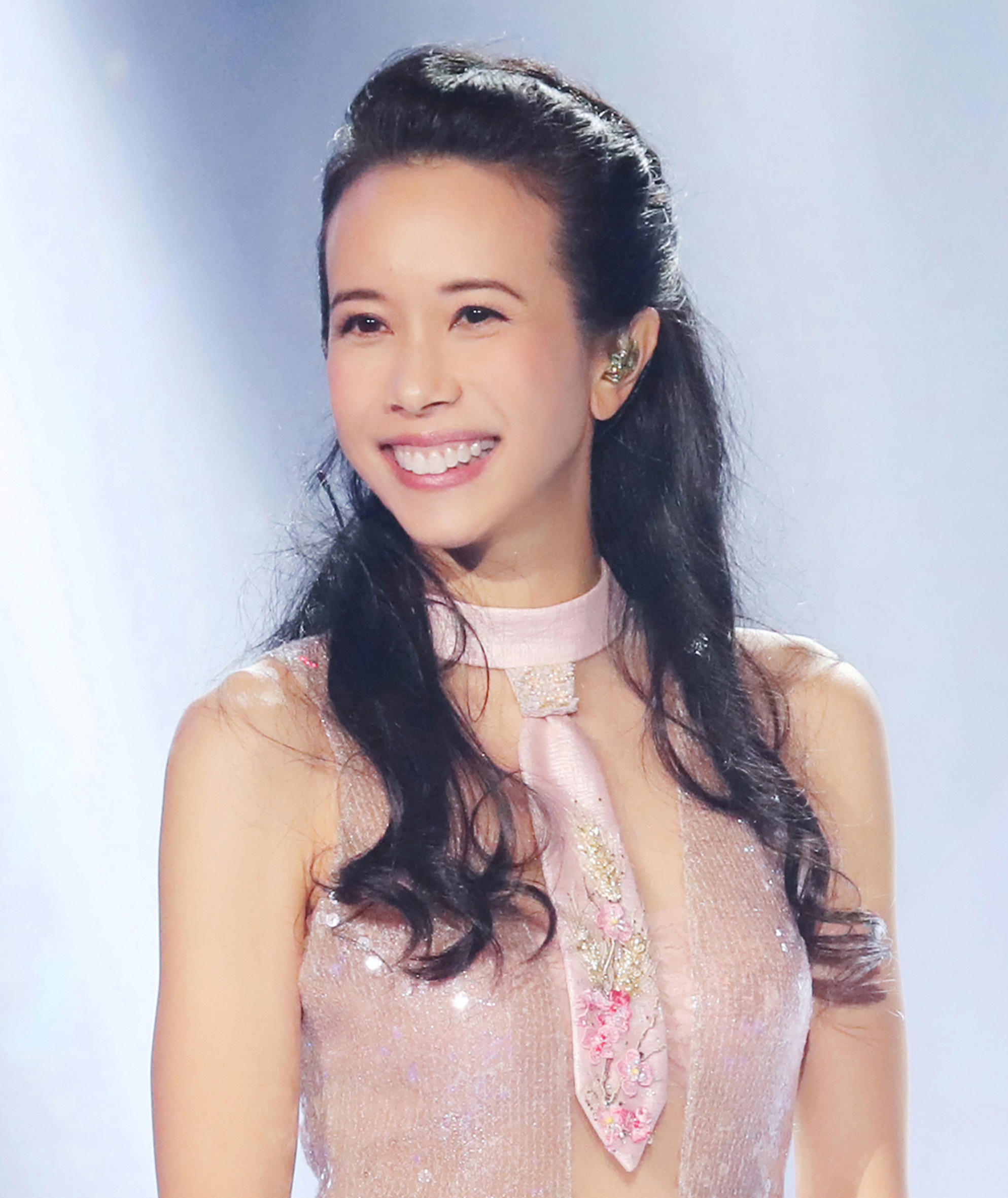
- Mok in October 2016
- Born: Karen Joy Morris; 2 June 1970 (age 56); British Hong Kong
- Occupations: Actress; singer
- Years active: 1993–present
- Spouse: Johannes Natterer (m. 2011)
- Musical career
- Genres: Cantopop; C-rock; alternative pop; pop rock; jazz; Mandopop
- Instruments: Vocals; piano; Gu Zheng
- Labels: Star Records (1993–1995); Rock Records (1996–2001); Sony BMG (2002–2008); Universal Music (2009–2017); Sony Music (2018–2022); Mok-A-Bye Baby Records (2018–present)

Chinese name
- Chinese: 莫文蔚
Transcriptions
Standard Mandarin
- Hanyu Pinyin: Mò Wén Wèi
Yue: Cantonese
- Jyutping: Mok6 Man4-wai3
- Website: karenmok.com

Karen Joy Morris (Chinese: 莫文蔚; pinyin: Mò Wénwèi; Jyutping: Mok6 Man4wai3; born 2 June 1970), better known as Karen Mok, is a Hong Kong actress and singer. She is considered one of the leading East Asian pop singers and actresses with a career spanning three decades. Mok is the first female Hong Kong singer to win the Golden Melody Award, and to date has won it three times.

Mok has released 18 solo studio albums, starred in over 50 movies, and has over 15 million followers on leading Chinese social media site Weibo. With the Lhasa concert during The Ultimate Karen Mok Show (2018–2021) she set the Guinness World Record for the Highest Altitude Mass-Attended Music Concert. In 2024, Mok was the first female singer to do a solo concert in Beijing National Stadium, the Bird's Nest. In 2025, Karen Mok teamed up with long-term collaborateurs, producers and musicians, Terry Chan, Araiz and James Lee to form the band Karen Mok & The Masters and released the first album in that new formation.

== Early life ==
Karen Mok was born on 2 June 1970 as Karen Joy Morris in Hong Kong. She is of mixed ancestry: her mother is half Chinese, quarter German and quarter Persian, while her father is half Welsh and half Chinese. Her grandfather was Alfred Morris, the first principal of King's College, Hong Kong. She speaks English, Cantonese, Mandarin, Italian, German and French.

Mok attended Diocesan Girls' School from primary to secondary grade in Hong Kong. When she was a F.4 student, she received the 1st Hong Kong Outstanding Students Awards. In 1987, she won a scholarship for the United World College of the Adriatic in Duino (Trieste, Italy) from which she graduated in 1989 with the International Baccalaureate. She subsequently studied Italian Literature at Royal Holloway, University of London.

== Music career ==
=== 1993–2004: Career beginnings and musical breakthrough ===
While studying in London, Mok auditioned for the West End Musical Miss Saigon. At the same time, she recorded music demo tapes together with fellow students, which landed her first recording contract with Star Records. She decided to put her theatre aspirations on hold, headed back to Hong Kong and released in 1993 her first Cantonese album, Karen. Later in 1996, Mok signed with Rock Records, where she came under the mentorship of legendary songwriter and producer Jonathan Lee. Recognising her distinctive voice and artistic potential, Lee helped shape her musical direction. She achieved her musical breakthrough with the launch of her first Mandarin album To Be in 1997. In 2000, she gave her debut solo concert, The Very Karen Mok Show, in Taipei in front of 20,000 spectators.In 2003, she became the first female Hong Kong singer to win the Golden Melody Award for Best Mandarin Female Singer, cementing her status as one of the region's leading Mandopop artists.

Alongside her music career, Mok established herself as one of Hong Kong's leading actresses. She gained widespread recognition through her performances in A Chinese Odyssey and acclaimed director Wong Kar-wai's Fallen Angels, winning the Hong Kong Film Award and the Hong Kong Film Critics Society Award for Best Supporting Actress for her performance in the latter.

=== 2005–2014: International efforts ===
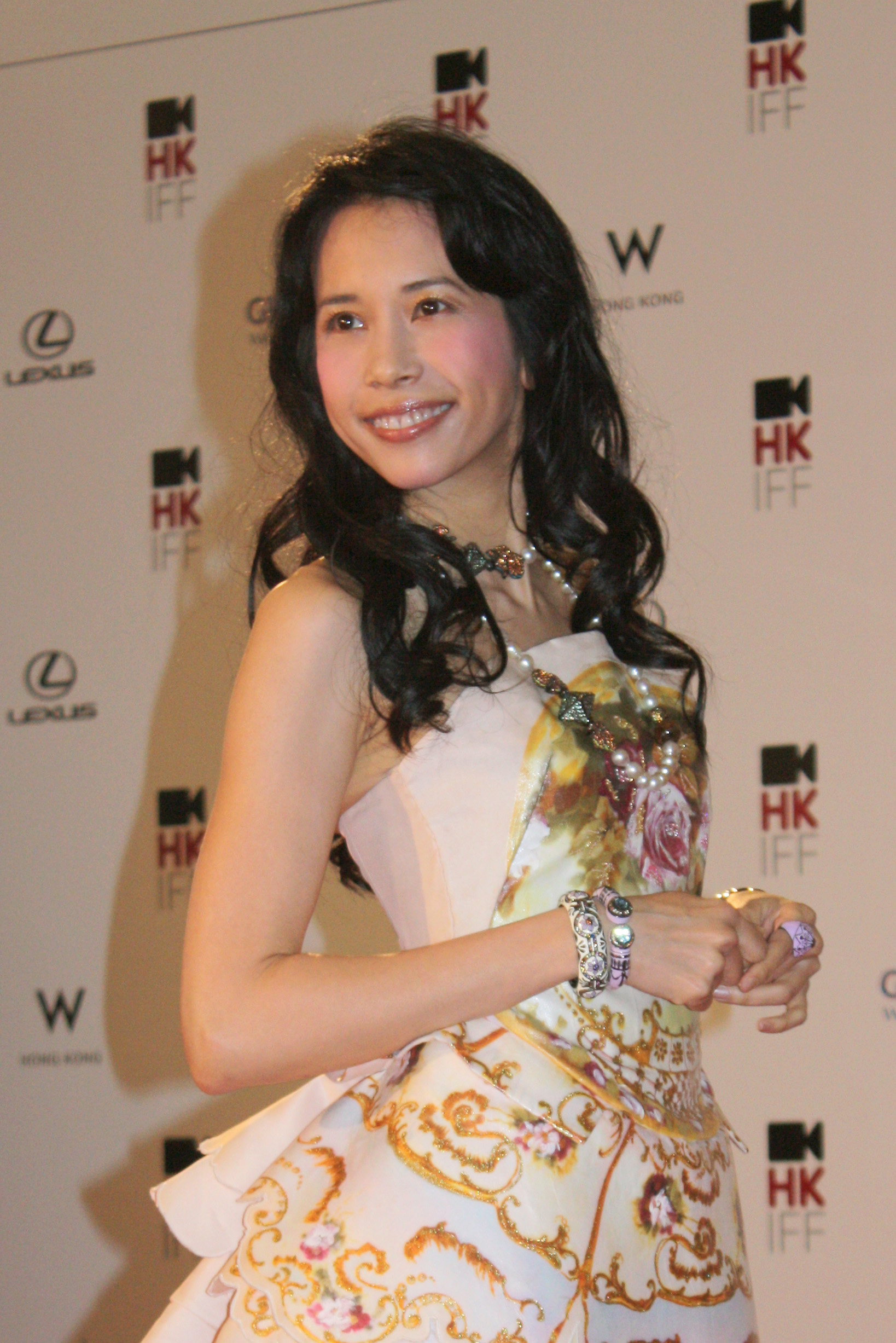
Mok at the 2009 Hong Kong International Film Festival

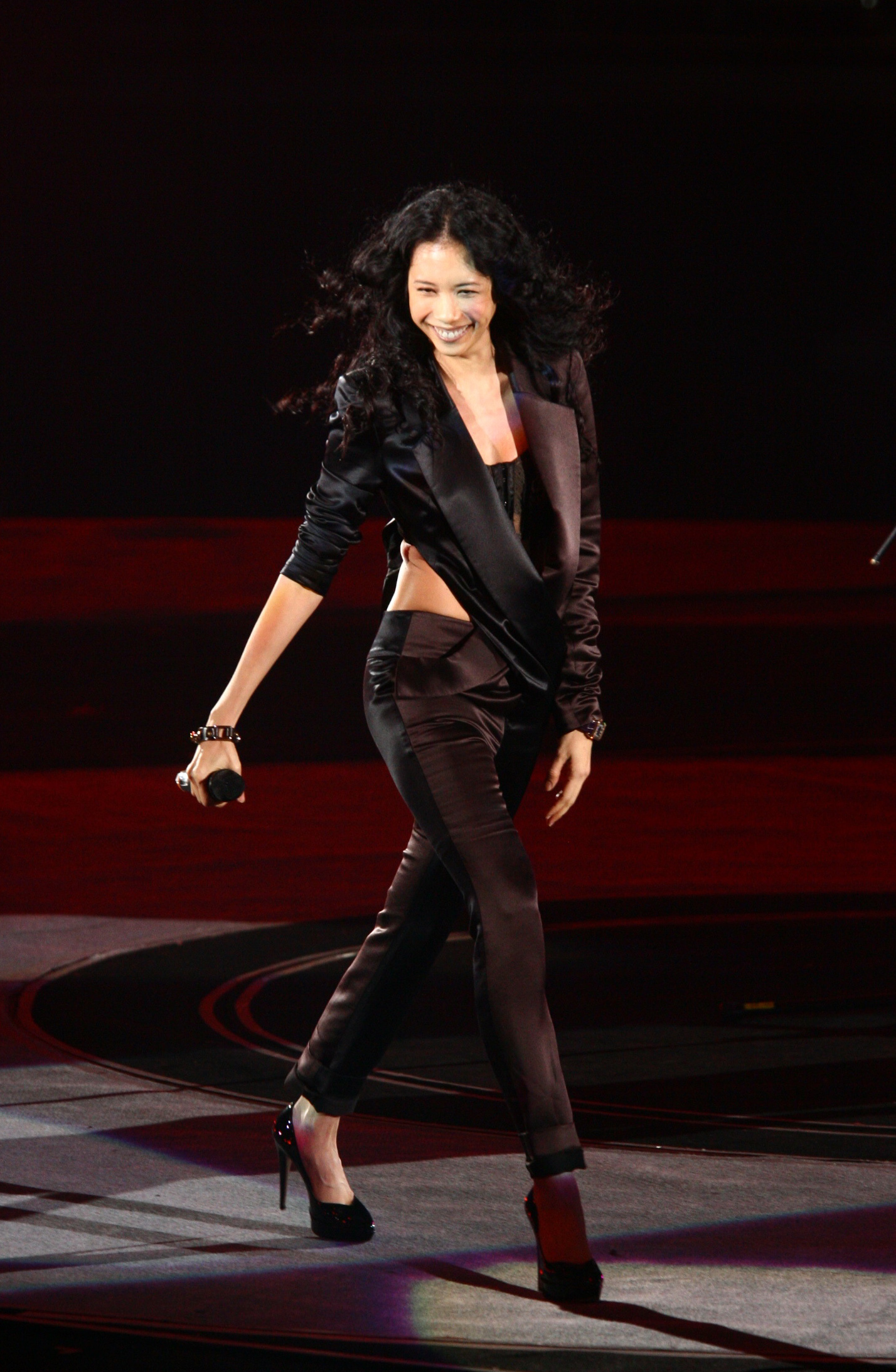
Mok in 2010

In 2005, she started her international concert tours with the Extremely Karen Mok Show. She also assumed the role of creative director and producer in her concert tours.

In 2013, she launched her English album Somewhere I belong, an East-meets-West reinterpretation of jazz classics. The album is recorded in China with East Asian musicians and adding the guzheng on several tracks. She showcased this album at Ronnie Scott's Jazz Club, London, on 30 May 2013. Mok said about the title of the album: "It's about what I do, when I feel comfortable, that's when I'm doing what I love most, that's singing, that's when I'm performing on stage, and just singing my heart out, sharing my emotions," she said. "So that's where I belong." The Age of Moknificence Tour (2014–2015) celebrated her 20th anniversary in show business.

=== 2015–2020: Tours and world records ===
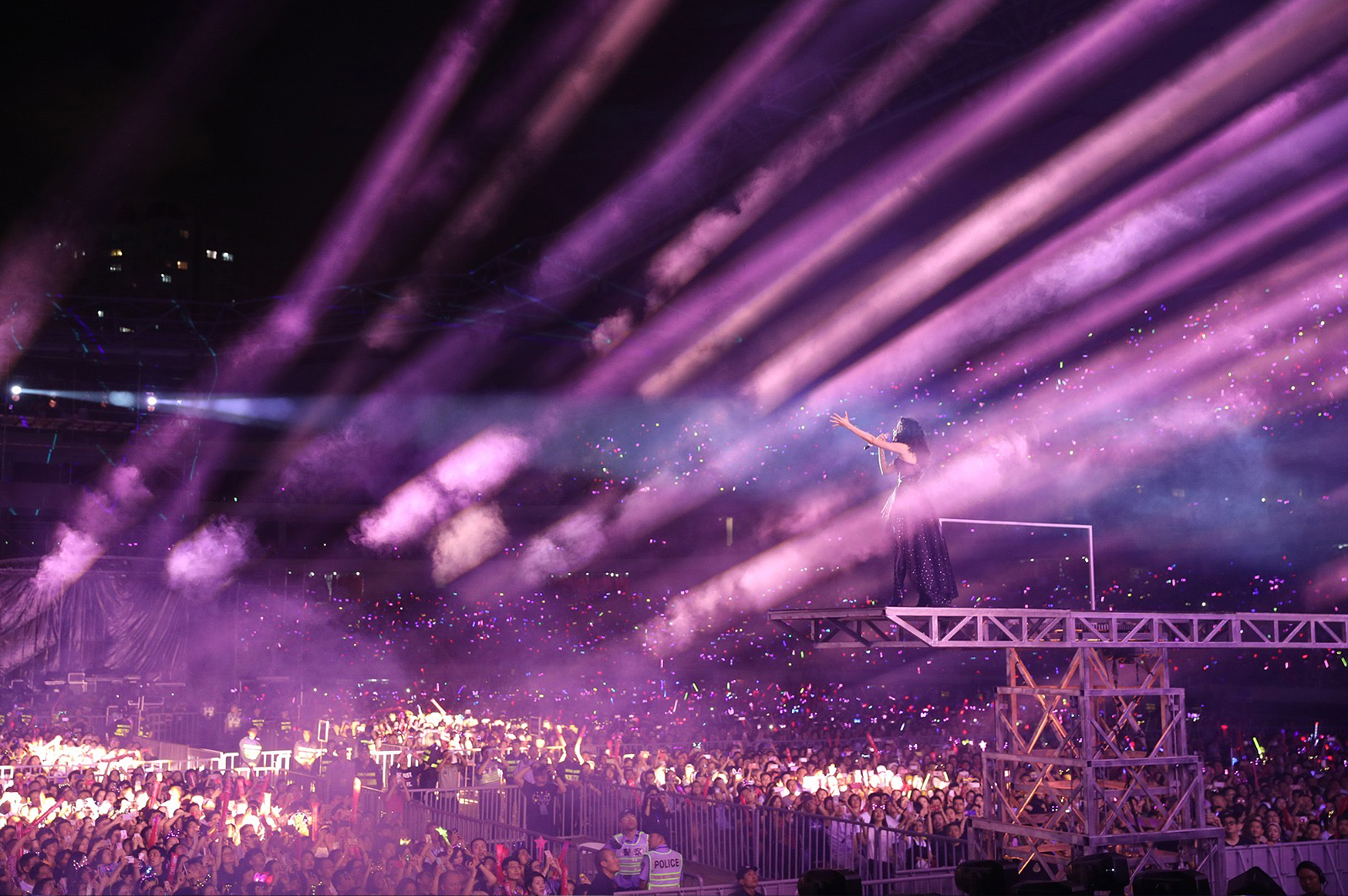
Mok performing at her concert in Shanghai on 23 June 2018.

The Regardez Tour (2015–2016) started in Taipei and led Mok to 27 cities in Asia, North America, Europe, Australia, and New Zealand. As part of this tour, she was the first Chinese pop artist to give solo concerts in Madrid and Milan.

The Ultimate Karen Mok Show started on 23 June 2018 with the concert in the Hongkou Football Stadium in Shanghai 23 June 2018 in front of more than 20,000 spectators and totaled 48 concerts in 40 cities in Asia, Europe and Australia. The tour was largely conducted in outdoor stadiums, with the maximum attendance of 40,000 in the Beijing Workers' Stadium, Beijing, on 22 September 2019. On 12 October 2019, she performed in Lhasa at an altitude of 3650m, setting the Guinness World Record for the Highest Altitude Mass-Attended Music Concert and being the first solo stadium concert in Tibet. Her concerts in the Taipei Arena on 7 and 8 December 2019 had the special feature that she performed entirely different song lists on each night. The European leg of the tour brought her to London at the Palladium and to Paris at the Folies Bergère, making her the first Chinese pop singer to perform in this venue..

Interrupted by the events around the global Covid pandemic, the tour finished with three concerts in Hong Kong in June 2021.

In May 2021, Mok won the Starlight Weibo Award 星耀年度金曲 award with Breathing is Hazardous at Weibo Starlight Awards 2020.

=== 2021–present: Top of her Game ===
Karen Mok's 2018 release《慢慢喜欢你 Growing to love you》 had topped the charts already three years before she released in 2021 her single《這世界那麼多人 Empty World》，propelling her to even more stardom and which became a national anthem in mainland China during the Covid pandemic.

In 2023, Karen Mok celebrated the 30th anniversary of her career in show business with dedicated exhibitions in Hong Kong, Shanghai, Beijing, Taipei and Chengdu, titled "Reign of Moknificence", featuring materials from her careers across music, film and charity.

In 2024 and 2025, Mok ran a series of large-scale stadium concerts titled "The Big Big Show", commencing in Beijing on 15 June 2024 in front of an audience of 60,000, followed by concerts in Shanghai, Chengdu, Shenzhen, Hangzhou and Wuhan in the later part of 2024. In 2025, the series continued with concerts in Suzhou, Chongqing, Nanjing, Shanghai, Tianjin and Xian. In the course of this concert series "The Big Big Show", she was the first female singer to perform a solo concert in Beijing's Bird's Nest stadium.

=== Karen Mok & The Masters ===
In 2024, Mok formed the rock band Karen Mok & The Masters, fulfilling a long-held ambition to form a rock band dating back to her youth. The group consists of Mok alongside musicians Terry Chan (陳明道), Arai (荒井十一) and James Lee (李銖銜).

The band was originally conceived as a limited project for Mok's The Big Big Show concert tour, with plans to perform together during the tour and produce one album. The project provided Mok with an opportunity to further explore rock music through a collaborative band format.

In 2025, Karen Mok & The Masters released their self-titled debut album. The four members have continued their collaboration beyond the project's original scope, subsequently creating and performing new material together, including the single "想想忘忘".

=== Notable collaborations ===
Mok has collaborated on stage and in the studio with numerous leading global artists. Amongst others, she performed together with The Black Eyed Peas, Andrea Bocelli, Far East Movement, Lang Lang, John Legend, Sergio Mendes, Mika, Keanu Reeves and Pharrell Williams.

== Acting career ==
=== Films ===
Mok gave her film debut in 1993 with a cameo role in the movie The Tigers – The Legend of Canton. Her first starring role was in 1995 together with Stephen Chow in A Chinese Odyssey. In the same year, she acted in Wong Kar Wai’s movie Fallen Angels, for which she received the award for Best Supporting Actress at the Hong Kong Film Award and the Golden Bauhinia Awards. In total, she starred in more than 50 movies.

Outside Greater China, she acted in the 2004 Hollywood production Around the World in 80 Days with Jackie Chan (credited as Karen Joy Morris, her birth name) and in the Thai horror movie The Coffin. She also played the female lead role in Keanu Reeves’ directorial debut Man of Tai Chi.

2024 saw her returning to the film screens with her role as Cecilia Fong in the Hong Kong radiation-disaster thriller Cesium Fallout (焚城).

=== Theatre and TV ===
Throughout her career, Mok has frequently branched into adjacent areas of performances. In 2005/2006, she played the female lead Mimi in the 10th Anniversary Asian Tour of the Broadway musical Rent. In 2001, she supplied the voice of Princess Kida for the Cantonese dub of Walt Disney's Atlantis: The Lost Empire. In 2020, Mok sang the theme song of the Hong Kong TVB drama Flying Tiger II. The theme song, "呼吸有害, Breathing Is Hazardous", topped all radio, TV and digital platforms in Hong Kong, a first in Cantopop.

In 2016 and 2017, she starred in the two reality TV productions Up Idol (我们来了), of Hunan Television and The Next (天籁之战), season 1 and season 2 (天籁之战 and 天籁之战 (第二季)), of Dragon Television.

Selected subsequent appearances on TV shows were in 2023 for Hunan TV's / Mango TV's music variety show Infinity and Beyond 2023: Treasure Island Season (声生不息·宝岛季) as well as in 2025 at Zhejiang TV's music show National Music Unrivaled (国乐无双).

== Public image ==
=== Special events ===
She was a torch bearer for the 2008 Summer Olympics held in Beijing and performed at the opening and closing ceremonies. In 2016, she was awarded the title of Cultural Ambassador of the Italian city of Bergamo, being the first Chinese to be awarded this title.

=== Brands ===
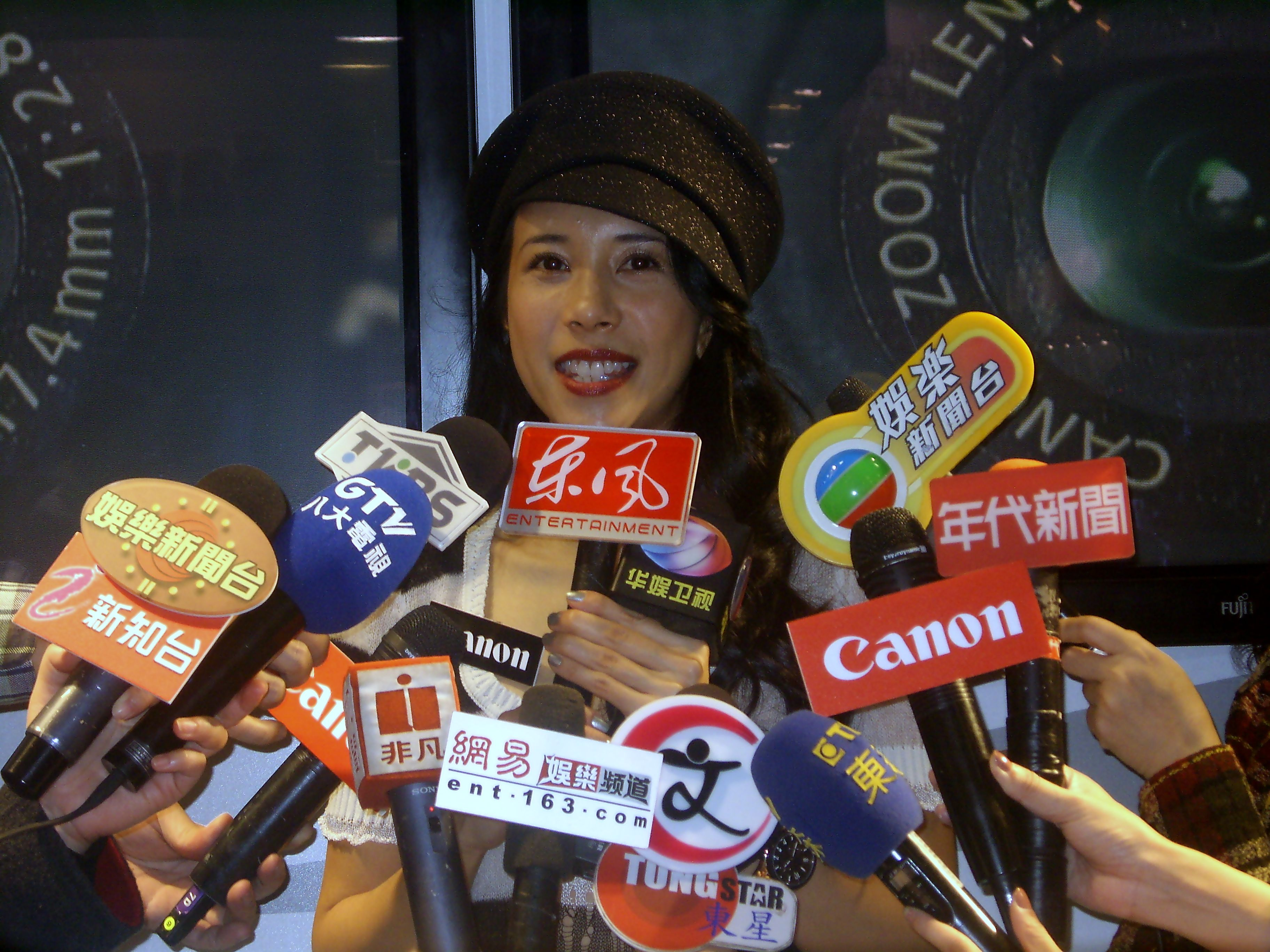
Mok being interviewed in 2007 at a Canon event in Taipei.

In October 2008, she launched her own line of perfume. Starting in 2015, she collaborated with the Italian brand Rucoline, also developing her own designs. In the following year, she initiated a crossover collection with Replay, leading up to a launch event and pop-up store at Harvey Nichols in London in 2018. Mok has been the face of leading global brands such as Cadillac, Canon, Cartier, Chow Tai Fook, Clear, Kappa, Lux, Mandarin Oriental, Schwarzkopf, Schweppes and Solvil et Titus.

=== Activism and charity ===
Mok is a strong advocate for animals and has been involved in numerous campaigns for this purpose. Amongst others, she has joined efforts with Animals Asia to help Asiatic black bears which are exploited for the extraction of bile, and has been on an expedition with Society for the Prevention of Cruelty to Animals (SPCA) to demonstrate against the culling of baby seals. She has also been involved with People for the Ethical Treatment of Animals (PETA).

In 2007, Mok was involved with MTV EXIT, a campaign against human trafficking in Asia, presenting Traffic: An MTV EXIT Special, a documentary on trafficking. In 2013 she championed in the campaign Roll Back Malaria (RBM). Mok currently serves as an ambassador for UNICEF, SPCA, Animals Asia Foundation and Care for Children. In 2017, Mok created the Morris Charity Initiative, providing support in animal welfare, education and the environment. As a first initiative, the charity raised money for a scholarship at the United World College Changshu. Since then, the charity has provided numerous donations to charities across the target areas and has set up scholarships to support university studies for graduates of Hong Kong King's College and Li Po Chun United World College.

== Creative ventures ==
Beyond her music and acting career, Mok has pursued a number of creative projects. In 2008, she created Mok-A-Bye Kitty, an original cartoon cat character inspired by her pet cat, Beethoven. The character became the focus of a multimedia project, including a three-issue comic series and a range of merchandise.

Later that year, Mok launched Karen Mok The Fragrance, which was promoted as Asia's first celebrity fragrance. The collection included a perfume, body lotion, and shower gel, with the fragrance inspired by Mok's personality and style. The launch was featured by Variety magazine and was regarded as a pioneering celebrity fragrance by an Asian artist.

== Personal life ==
Mok married her first boyfriend, German-born Johannes Natterer, at a church near Florence, Italy, on 1 October 2011. Mok has three adult step-children and spends her time between London and her international engagements. In 2017, they celebrated their sixth wedding anniversary with an elaborate party at Kensington Palace.

== Filmography ==
Year	English title	Chinese title	Role
1993	The Tigers – The Legend of Canton	廣東五虎之鐵拳無敵孫中山	Feminist
1994	Family Affair	清官難審	Diana
1995	Fallen Angels	墮落天使	Blondie
1995	Out of the Dark	回魂夜	Kwan
1995	Heaven Can't Wait	救世神棍	Joan
1995	A Chinese Odyssey Part One: Pandora's Box	西遊記之月光寶盒	Pak Jing-jing
1995	A Chinese Odyssey Part Two: Cinderella	西遊記之仙履奇緣	Pak Jing-jing
1996	The God of Cookery	食神	Twin Dagger Turkey
1996	Viva Erotica	色情男女	May
1996	Black Mask	黑俠	Tracy Tsui
1996	Best of the Best	飛虎II之傲氣比天高	Karen Kook
1996	Kitchen	我愛廚房	Jenny
1996	Four Faces of Eve	四面夏娃	Mistress of Chan Giu's husband
1996	Young and Dangerous 3	古惑仔III之隻手遮天	Lam Shuk-fan
1996	Sexy and Dangerous	古惑女	Van Chai / Chan Lai-wan
1996	Those Were the Days	4個32A和一個香蕉少年	Patricia (adult)
1996	wkw/tk/1996@7'55"hk.net		
1997	Task Force	熱血最強	Shirley Lau
1997	Lawyer Lawyer	算死草	Wu Man
1997	First Love: The Litter on the Breeze	初纏戀後之二人世界	
1997	Young and Dangerous 4	97古惑仔之戰無不勝	Wasabi / Lam Shuk-fan
1999	King of Comedy	喜劇之王	Sister Cuckoo
1999	Tempting Heart	心動	Chen Li
2000	Dragon Heat	龍火	
2000	The Teacher Without Chalk	流氓師表	Sister Teresa
2000	Roaring Wheels	車神傳說	Suki Fung
2000	Bruce Law Stunts	特技猛龍	(herself)
2001	Goodbye, Mr. Cool	九龍冰室	Helen Poon / Macau Hung
2001	Shaolin Soccer	少林足球	Dragon Twin
2001	La Brassiere	絕世好bra	Shirley
2002	Haunted Office	Office有鬼	Pat
2002	The Irresistible Piggies	豬扒大聯盟	So Mei
2002	So Close	夕陽天使	Kong Yat-hung
2002	Red Snow	極地營救	
2003	The Twins Effect	千機變	Ivy
2003	Love Under the Sun	愛在陽光下	
2004	Enter the Phoenix	大佬愛美麗	Julie Lui
2004	Around the World in 80 Days	環遊世界80天	General Fang
2005	DragonBlade: The Legend of Lang	龍刀奇緣	Ying Ying (voice)
2005	Wait 'til You're Older	童夢奇緣	Tsui Man
2006	The Heavenly Kings	四大天王	(herself)
2006	Magic & Me	千變魔手	(herself)
2007	Mr. Cinema	老港正傳	Luk Min
2008	Lost Indulgence	秘岸	Su Dan
2008	The Coffin	棺材	Zoe
2010	Go Lala Go!	杜拉拉升職記	Rose
2010	The Road Less Traveled	一路有你	Susan
2011	The Law of Attraction	萬有引力	Mei
2011	East Meets West	東成西就2011	Chung Siu-ming / Sammi
2013	Man of Tai Chi	太極俠	Sun Jing Shi
2013	Better and Better	越來越好·村晚	
2014	The Great Hypnotist	催眠大師	Ren Xiaoyan
2016	A Chinese Odyssey Part Three	大話西遊 – 叁	Pak Jing-jing
2024	Cesium Fallout	焚城	Cecilia
2026	Cold War 1994	寒戰1994	Poon Yi-Chi

== Discography ==
- Karen (1993)
- Karen Mok in Totality (1996)
- To Be (1997)
- I Say (1998)
- You Can (1999)
- This is Karen Mok (1999)
- Karen Mok on the Twelfth Floor (2000)
- Golden Flower (2001)
- [i] (2002)
- X (2003)
- Without You (2006)
- Live is… Karen Mok (2007)
- Hui Wei (2009)
- Precious (2010)
- Somewhere I Belong (2013)
- Departures (2014)
- Half Time (2018)
- The Voyage (2021)
- Karen Mok & The Masters (2025)

== Concert tours ==
- Very Karen Mok Live Tour (2000–2001)
- Karen Mok China Tour (2003)
- The Extremely Karen Mok Show (2005–2006)
- The Original Karen Mok Show (2009–2011)
- The Age of Moknificence Tour (2013–2015)
- Regardez World Tour (2015–2016)
- The Ultimate Karen Mok Show (2018–2021)
- The Big Big Show (2024–2025)

== Awards and nominations ==
=== Baidu Entertainment Hot Point Awards ===
Year	Nominated work	Category	Result	Ref.
2010 Seanson 2	Go Lala Go!	Most Popular Female Actor (Hong Kong)	Won	

=== Golden Bauhinia Awards ===
Year	Nominated work	Category	Result	Ref.
1996	Fallen Angels	Best Supporting actress	Won	
2000	Tempting Heart	Best Supporting actress	Nominated	

=== Golden Horse Awards ===
Year	Nominated work	Category	Result	Ref.
1997	The God of Cookery	Golden Horse Award for Best Leading Actress	Nominated	

=== Golden Rooster Awards ===
Year	Nominated work	Category	Result	Ref.
2007	Mr.Cinema	Golden Rooster Award for Best Supporting Actress	Nominated	

=== Hong Kong Film Awards ===
Year	Nominated work	Category	Result	Ref.
1996	Fallen Angels	Hong Kong Film Award for Best Supporting Actress	Won	
1997	Viva Erotica（色情男女）with Jordan Chan	Hong Kong Film Award for Best Original Film Song	Nominated	
1997	God of Cookery	Hong Kong Film Award for Best Actress	Nominated	
2006	Wait 'Til You're Older	Hong Kong Film Award for Best Actress	Nominated	
2008	Mr.Cinema	Hong Kong Film Award for Best Supporting Actress	Nominated	

=== Hong Kong Film Critics Society Award ===
Year	Nominated work	Category	Result	Ref.
1996	Heaven Can't Wait	Best Actress	Nominated	
1996	Out of the Dark	Best Actress	Nominated	
1998	First Love: The Litter on the Breeze	Best Actress	Runner-up	
1998	Task Force	Best Actress	Nominated	
2006	Wait 'Til You're Older	Best Actress	Nominated	
2012	East Meets West	Best Actress	Nominated	

=== Huading Awards ===
Year	Nominated work	Category	Result	Ref.
2011	Go Lala Go!	Best Supporting Actress in a Motion Picture	Nominated	
2015		Best Female Singer（China）	Won	
2022	Empty World（"Love Will Tear Us Apart"）	Best Global Original Song	Nominated	

=== Macau International Movie Festival ===
Year	Nominated work	Category	Result	Ref.
2010	Go Lala Go!	Golden Lotus Award for Best Supporting Actress	Nominated	
2016	A Chinese Odyssey Part Three	Golden Lotus Award for Best Supporting Actress	Nominated	

=== Hundred Flowers Awards ===
Year	Nominated work	Category	Result	Ref.
2012	Go Lala Go!	Hundred Flowers Award for Best Supporting Actress	Nominated	

=== Asia Song Festival ===
Year	Category	Result	Ref.
2008	Best Female Asian Artist（China）	Won	

=== Asia Pop 40 ===
Year	top 140 songs in Asia	Category	Result	Ref.
2018	"Growing Fond of You"（Yearly Ranking：5）	Best Female Singer（Mandarin version）	Bronze	
2019	"Not Enough Love"（Yearly Ranking：26）		Won	
2020	"Breathing Is Hazardous"（Yearly Ranking：20）		Won	
2021	"Empty World"（Yearly Ranking：9）		Won	

=== Asian Pop Music Awards ===
Year	Nominated work	Category	Result	Ref.
2021 (Chinese)	The Voyage	Top 20 Albums of the Year	Won	
2021 (Chinese)	The Voyage	Best Female Singer	Nominated	
2021 (Chinese)	"Empty World"	Song of the Year	Nominated	
2021 (Chinese)	"Empty World"	Best OST	Won	
2021 (Chinese)	"Empty World"	Top 20 Songs of the Year	Won	
2024 (Chinese)	"I Miss You"	Top 20 Songs of the Year	Won	
2024 (Chinese)	"I Miss You"	Best OST	Nominated	

=== Beijing Pop Music Awards ===
Year	Nominated work	Category	Result	Ref.
2007		Best Female Stage Performance	Won	
2009		Best Female Stage Performance	Nominated	
2009		Most Popular Female Singer	Nominated	
2009		Best All-Round Artist（Hong Kong/Taiwan）	Won	
2009	"The Outside World"	Top 30 Songs	Won	
2009	Hui Wei	Best Female Singer	Nominated	
2009	Hui Wei	Best Album（Hong Kong/Taiwan）	Won	
2010	"Precious"	Best Album（Hong Kong/Taiwan）	Nominated	
2010	"Precious"	Best Composer	Nominated	
2010	"Precious"	Best Female Singer（Hong Kong/Taiwan）	Nominated	
2010	"Precious"	Top 30 songs	Won	
2010		Most Popular Female Singer(Hong Kong/Taiwan)	Won	
2010		Best Female Stage Performance	Nominated	
2010		Best Singer-Songwriter（Hong Kong/Taiwan）	Nominated	

=== China Central Television – MTV Music Awards ===
Year	Nominated work	Category	Result	Ref.
1999		Best New Singer（Asia）	Won	
2003		Best Female Singer (Hong Kong)	Won	
2008		Most Popular Female Singer（Hong Kong）	Won	
2010	"In that Far-Off Place"	Best Music Video（Hong Kong/Macau/Taiwan）	Nominated	
2010		Best Female Singer （Hong Kong/Macau/Taiwan）	Nominated	
2012		Best Female Singer （Hong Kong/Macau/Taiwan）	Won	
2012		Most Popular Female Singer(HK/Macau/Taiwan)	Nominated	

=== China Music Awards ===
Year	Nominated work	Category	Result	Ref.
1998	"Too Little Time"	Top 20 Songs	Won	
2000	"Overcast"	Top 20 Songs	Won	
2001	"Lazy to Bother"	Top 20 Songs	Won	
2003	"Ai"	Top 20 Songs	Won	
2003	Most Popular Fashionable Female Singer（Hong Kong/Taiwan）		Won	
2010	Hui Wei	Best Female Singer（Hong Kong）	Nominated	
2011		Most Popular Female Singer (Hong Kong/Taiwan)	Nominated	
2011		Best Crossover Singer	Nominated	
2011		Best Female Singer (Hong Kong/Taiwan)	Nominated	
2012		Best Female Singer (Hong Kong/Taiwan)	Won	
2012		Asia Fashionable Singer	Won	
2013	Somewhere I Belong	Best Crossover Album	Won	
2013		Best Crossover Singer（Asia-Pacific）	Won	
2014		Best Female Singer (Hong Kong/Taiwan)	Nominated	
2015		Best Female Singer (Hong Kong/Taiwan)	Nominated	
2015		All-Round Singer（Asia）	Won	
2015		Most Popular Influential Singer（Asia）	Won	
2016	"A Moment Between" with Jason Zhang	Channel V Best Film Song of the Year	Won	
2016		Best Influential Crossover Singer（Asia）	Won	
2016		Best Female Singer (Hong Kong/Taiwan)	Won	
2018		Best Female Singer (Hong Kong/Taiwan)	Nominated	

=== Chinese Music Awards ===
Year	Nominated work	Category	Result
2014	Somewhere I Belong	Best Jazz/Blues Artist	Won
2014	Departures	Best Mandarin Female Singer	Nominated
2018	"I Do"	Best Mandarin Song	Nominated
2018	"I Do"	Top 10 Mandarin Songs	Won
2020	Half Time	Top 10 Mandarin Albums	Won
2020	Half Time	Best Mandarin Female Singer	Nominated
2020	Half Time	Best Mandarin Album	Nominated
2021	"Breathing Is Hazardous"	Top 10 Cantonese Songs	Won
2021	"Breathing Is Hazardous"	Best Cantonese Song	Won

=== Chinese Top Ten Music Awards ===
Year	Nominated work	Category	Result	Ref.
2018		Outstanding Singer of the Year（Asia）	Won	
2018		Earthshaking Achievement Award	Won	
2019	"Growing Fond of You"	Song of the Year	Won	
2022	"Empty World"	Song of the Year	Won	

=== CMIC Music Awards ===
Ceremony	Nominated work	Category	Result	Ref.
3rd	Half Time	Best Pop Album	Nominated	
3rd	Half Time	Female Singer of the Year	Nominated	
4th	"Not Enough Love"	Female Singer of the Year	Nominated	
5th	"Breathing Is Hazardous"	Female Singer of the Year	Nominated	

=== Ultimate Song Chart Awards Presentation ===
Year	Nominated work	Category	Result	Ref.
2000	Artist of the Year（Ultimate 903 / ERC Chinese Top Ten / UFO Radio）		Won	
2021	"Breathing Is Hazardous"	Ultimate 903 Song of the Year	Won	

=== CASH Golden Sail Music Awards ===
Year	Nominated work	Category	Result	Ref.
2015	"Flaw" with Juno Mak	Best Vocal Collaborations	Won	
2018	"Growing Fond of You"	Best Vocal Performance by a Female Artist	Won	
2019	"Growing Fond of You"	Most Performed Works Awards – Mandarin Pop Work	Won	

=== Global Chinese Golden Chart Awards ===
Year	Nominated work	Category	Result	Ref.
2015	"Regardez"	Top Twenty Hits	Won	
2018	San Francisco Sing Tao Chinese Radio Recommended Singer		Won	
2019	"Growing Fond of You"	Top Twenty Hits	Won	
2019	Half Time	Best Album	Won	
2019		Most Popular Female Singer	Won	

=== Global Chinese Music Awards ===
Year	Nominated work	Category	Result	Ref.
2018	"Growing Fond of You"	Top Twenty Hits	Won	
2018		Top Five Most Popular Female Artistes	Won	
2019		Top Five Most Popular Female Artistes	Won	
2019		Versatile Artiste	Won	

=== Global Chinese Pop Chart ===
Year	Nominated work	Category	Result	Ref.
2018		Best Female Stage Performance	Nominated	
2018		Best Female Singer（HK/Taiwan & Overseas）	Nominated	
2018		Most Popular Female Singer(HK/Taiwan&Overseas)	Won	
2018		Best All-Round Female Artist	Won	
2018	"Growing Fond of You"	Top 20 Songs	Won	
2018	Half Time	Best Album（HK/Taiwan & Overseas）	Nominated	

=== Golden Melody Awards ===
Year	Nominated work	Category	Result
1998	To Be	Album of the Year	Nominated
2000	"You Can"	Best Female Mandarin Singer	Nominated
2001	Karen Mok On the 12th Floor	Best Female Mandarin Singer	Nominated
2001	Karen Mok On the 12th Floor	Album of the Year	Nominated
2003	I	Best Female Mandarin Singer	Won
2007	"Same World"	Song of the Year	Nominated
2008	L!VE IS...KAREN MOK	Best Female Mandarin Singer	Nominated
2008	L!VE IS...KAREN MOK	Best Mandarin Album	Won
2010	Hui Wei	Best Mandarin Album	Nominated
2010	Hui Wei	Best Female Mandarin Singer	Nominated
2011	Precious	Best Female Mandarin Singer	Won
2011	Precious	Best Mandarin Album	Nominated
2011	"Perfect Loneliness"	Song of the Year	Nominated
2011	"Perfect Loneliness"	Best Composition	Nominated
2015	Departures	Best Female Mandarin Singer	Nominated
2015	Departures	Best Mandarin Album	Nominated
2015	Departures	Best Vocal Recording Album	Nominated

=== Hit FM Top 100 Singles of the Year ===
Year	Nominated work	Ranking	Result	Ref.
1998	"Too Little Time"	21	Won	
1998	"Love"	31	Won	
1999	"Overcast"	15	Won	
2000	"Oh Lonely Lovers"	45	Won	
2002	"Ai"	50	Won	
2003	"Love You to Death"	59	Won	
2006	"Without You"	100	Won	
2014	"Regardez"	78	Won	
2015	"Departures"	65	Won	
2018	"Growing Fond of You"	63	Won	

=== Hito Music Awards ===
Year	Nominated work	Category	Result	Ref.
2003		Hito Recommended Singer（Hong Kong）	Won	
2019		Most Popular Female Singer	Nominated	
2019	"Growing Fond of You"	Top Ten Chinese Songs of the Year	Won	
2019		Global Media Recommended Artist	Won	

=== Jade Solid Gold Best Ten Music Awards Presentation ===
Year	Nominated work	Category	Result	Ref.
2002 Season 2	"I"	Most Popular Mandarin Song	Won	
2003 Season 4	"See Through"	Most Popular Mandarin Song	Won	
2004	"See Through"	Most Popular Mandarin Song	Gold	
2020 Season 1	"Breathing Is Hazardous"	Top 25 Songs	Won	
2021	"Breathing Is Hazardous"	Gold Song Gold Award	Won	
2021	"Breathing Is Hazardous"	Top 10 Song awards	Won	

=== Joox Top Music Awards ===
Year	Nominated work	Category	Result	Ref.
2020 Season 2	"Breathing Is Hazardous"	Joox Top Recommended OST（First Place）	Won	
2020 Season 3	"Breathing Is Hazardous"	Joox Top Sing Recommended Karaoke Song（First Place）	Won	
2021	"Breathing Is Hazardous"	Joox Top Sing Recommended Karaoke Song（First Place）	Won	
2021	"Breathing Is Hazardous"	Joox Top Recommended OST（First Place）	Won	
2021		Joox Top Ten Recommended Artist	Won	

=== KKBox Music Awards ===
Year	Category	Result	Ref.
2019	Top 10 Artist of the Year（Taiwan）	Won	
2021	Top 10 Artist of the Year（Hong Kong）	Won	

=== Ku Music Asian Music Awards ===
Year	Nominated work	Category	Result	Ref.
2016	"A Moment Between" with Jason Zhang	Best Film / Television Song of the Year	Won	

=== MAMA Awards ===
Year	Category	Result	Ref.
2017	MAMA Award for Best Asian Artist（Mandarin）	Won	

=== Metro Radio Hits Music Awards ===
Year	Nominated work	Category	Result	Ref.
1996	"Viva Erotica"	Hits Alternative Song	Won	
1999	"The Way You Make Me Feel"	Hits Film Song	Won	
1999	Four Stations Joint Music Awards – Outstanding Achievement Award		Bronze	
2002	"I"	Hits Mandarin Song	Won	
2002		Hits Mandarin Female Singer	Won	
2003		Hits Female Singer（Asia）	Won	
2003	"Transparent"	Hits Karaoke Song	Won	
2003	"Transparent"	Hits Song	Won	
2020	"Breathing Is Hazardous"	Hits Song	Won	
2020	"Breathing Is Hazardous"	Artist of the Year	Won	

=== Migu Music Awards ===
Year	Nominated work	Category	Result	Ref.
2008		奧運推廣傑出歌手	Won	
2009	"Mi Liu"	Best Selling Electronic Song	Won	
2009	Hui Wei	First Published Digital Album	Won	
2018		Best Popularity Female Singer	Nominated	
2018		Most Popular Female Singer (Hong Kong/Taiwan)	Won	
2018	"Growing Fond of You"	Top 10 Songs of the Year	Won	

=== MTV Asia Awards ===
Year	Category	Result	Ref.
2008	The Inspiration Award	Won	

=== MTV Video Music Awards ===
Year	Nominated work	Category	Result	Ref.
1998	"He Doesn't Love Me"	International Viewer's Choice: MTV Mandarin	Nominated	
2001	"Lazy to Bother"	International Viewer's Choice: MTV Mandarin	Nominated	

=== Music Pioneer Awards ===
Year	Nominated work	Category	Result	Ref.
2020		Most Influential Singer（Asia-Pacific）	Won	
2020	The Ultimate Karen Mok Show	Most Influential Concert（Asia-Pacific）	Won	

=== Music Radio China Top Chart Awards ===
Year	Nominated work	Category	Result	Ref.
2003	"Single Room, Double Bed"	Top Ten Songs（Hong Kong/Taiwan）	Won	
2008 (Hong Kong/Taiwan)	L!VE IS...KAREN MOK	Most Popular Female Singer	Nominated	
2008 (Hong Kong/Taiwan)		Best Female Singer	Nominated	
2011 (Hong Kong/ Taiwan)		Best Female Singer	Nominated	
2011 (Hong Kong/ Taiwan)		Most Popular Female Singer	Nominated	
2011 (Hong Kong/ Taiwan)	"Precious"	Best Composer	Nominated	
2011 (Hong Kong/ Taiwan)	"Precious"	Top 15 Songs	Won	
2011 (Hong Kong/ Taiwan)	Precious	Best Album	Won	
2014		Most Popular Female Singer (Hong Kong/Taiwan)	Nominated	
2015 (Hong Kong/ Taiwan)		Most Popular Female Singer (Hong Kong/Taiwan)	Nominated	
2015 (Hong Kong/ Taiwan)		Best Female Singer	Nominated	
2015 (Hong Kong/ Taiwan)	Departures	Most Popular Album	Nominated	
2015 (Hong Kong/ Taiwan)	Departures	Best Album	Won	
2015 (Hong Kong/ Taiwan)	"Regardez"	Top 15 Songs	Won	
2018	Half Time	Most Popular Female Singer	Nominated	

=== Southeast Music Chart Awards ===
Ceremony	Nominated work	Category	Result	Ref.
1st	"I"	Top 10 Songs (Hong Kong/Taiwan)	Won	
1st		Most Popular Female Singer (Hong Kong)	Won	
2nd		Best Female Singer (Hong Kong/Taiwan)	Nominated	
2nd	X	Perfect Album (Hong Kong/Taiwan)	Nominated	
2nd		Best Record Sales Female Singer	Nominated	
4th		Mandopop Outstanding Singer	Nominated	
4th		Mandopop Most Popular Singer	Nominated	
7th	Hui Wei	Best Digital Album	Won	
7th	"Beat Your Drum and Sing Your Song"	Top 10 Songs	Won	
7th		Best Female Singer (Hong Kong/Taiwan)	Won	
8th		Best Female Singer (Hong Kong/Taiwan)	Nominated	
8th	Precious	Best Album	Nominated	
8th	The Original Karen Mok Show	Perfect Concert	Nominated	

=== Tencent Music Entertainment Awards ===
Year	Nominated work	Category	Result	Ref.
2021	"Empty World"	Top 10 Songs of the Year	Won	

=== Top Chinese Music Awards ===
Year	Nominated work	Category	Result	Ref.
2001 (Hong Kong/ Taiwan)	"Fruits of Mid Summer"	Top 10 Songs	Won	
2001 (Hong Kong/ Taiwan)		Leap award for Female Singer	Won	
2001 (Hong Kong/ Taiwan)	"Why Do I Love You So Much" with Wong Bun-yun	The Best Group Songs	Nominated	
2001 (Hong Kong/ Taiwan)		Best Female Singer	Nominated	
2003 (Hong Kong/ Taiwan)	"I"	Best Female Singer	Nominated	
2003 (Hong Kong/ Taiwan)	"I"	Best Music Video	Nominated	
2003 (Hong Kong/ Taiwan)	"I"	Top 10 Songs	Won	
2010(Hong Kong/ Taiwan)	"I"	Top 10 Songs in 10 Years	Won	
2010(Hong Kong/ Taiwan)		Most Influential Singer in 10 Years	Won	
2011(Hong Kong/ Taiwan)	Precious	Best Female Singer	Nominated	
2011(Hong Kong/ Taiwan)	Precious	Best Album	Nominated	

=== Top Ten Chinese Gold Songs Award ===
Year	Nominated work	Category	Result	Ref.
1996	"Viva Erotica"	Best C-pop song award	Nominated	
1999		Leap Award for Female Singer	Nominated	
2001	"Why Do I Love You So Much?" with Wong Bun-yun	Outstanding Mandarin Song Award	Silver	
2003	"I"	Outstanding Mandarin Song Award	Bronze	
2003		National Most Popular Female Singer Award	Bronze	
2021	"Breathing Is Hazardous"	Top 10 Song Awards	Won	
2021	"Breathing Is Hazardous"	International Chinese Award	Won	

=== TVB8 Mandarin Music on Demand Awards Presentation ===
Year	Nominated work	Category	Result	Ref.
2002		Global Media Female Singer	Won	
2002	"Single Room, Double Bed"	Top 15 Songs	Won	
2003	"Love You to Death"	Top 15 Songs	Won	
2003		Most Popular Female Singer	Won	
2008	"Matinees, Evening Shows"	Top 10 Songs	Won	
2008		Favorite Female Singer（Mainland China Audience）	Won	

=== Weibo Music Awards ===
Year	Nominated work	Category	Result	Ref.
2019		Influential Singer（Asia）	Won	
2019	"Growing Fond of You"	Best Planning Song of the Year	Won	
2023		Achievement of the Year Award	Won	
2025	Karen Mok & The Masters	Breakout Band of the Year	Won	
2025		All-Round Artist of the Year	Won	
