= Without You (Karen Mok album) =

Studio album by Karen Mok
- Released: 7 April 2006
- Recorded: 2005–2006
- Genre: C-pop; Cantopop; Chinese rock; alternative pop; pop rock
- Language: Mandarin, Cantonese
- Label: Sony BMG Music Entertainment

Karen Mok chronology
X (2003)	Without You (2006)	Live is… Karen Mok (2007)

Without You (Chinese: 如果没有你; pinyin: Rúguǒ Méiyǒu Nǐ) is an album by Hong Kong singer Karen Mok, released on 7 April 2006 by Sony. Most of the lyrics are in Mandarin, with two tracks in Cantonese.

== Track listing ==
1. 野
2. 一口一口 (Yì Kǒu Yì Kǒu, "One Mouthful, One Mouthful")
3. 如果没有你 (Rúguǒ Méiyǒu Nǐ, "Without You")
4. 24 hrs
5. 一个人睡 (Yígè Rén Shuǐ, "Sleeping Alone")
6. 甜美生活 (Tiānměi Shēnghuǒ, "Happy Life")
7. 手 (Shǒu, "Hand")
8. 薄荷 (Bòhe, "Peppermint")
9. AM PM
10. 天下大同 (Tiān Xià Dà Tóng, "Same World") (Writer: Jay Chou)
11. Fire
12. 24 hrs (Cantonese)
13. 众生缘 (Cantonese)
