= To Be (album) =

Studio album by Karen Mok
- Released: 21 October 1997
- Recorded: 1997
- Genre: Mando-Pop
- Length: 54:36
- Label: Rock Records

Karen Mok chronology
Karen Mok in Totality (1996)	To Be (1997)	I Say (1998)

To Be (Chinese: 做自己; pinyin: Zuò zìjǐ, "be yourself") is the 1997 debut Mandarin-language pop album by Hong Kong singer Karen Mok. It was first released on 21 October 1997 by Rock Records and it was Mok's first album for the Taiwan and PRC markets. Then in 1998, "Diamond Shining Edition" was released, and the "I Love You" EP was included. A vinyl collector's edition was released on December 21, 2018.

== Information ==
Considered her commercial breakthrough, To Be skyrocketed Mok to fame throughout Asia with many of the songs receiving heavy rotation on radio stations and music video channels across the Sinophone world. The album was a huge hit, eventually selling over 800,000 copies, and included the massive hit single and one of her signature songs, Ta Bu Ai Wo ("He Loves Me Not"). It also contained other hit singles such as "Hiroshima Mon Amour" and "Radio Love Song." After the lukewarm commercial response to her previous efforts To Be helped Mok cross over to singing and is considered a massive stepping stone to Mok becoming one of Mandopop's lead divas.

== Track listing ==
1. Love Yourself
2. Tā bù ài wǒ (他不愛我 He Loves Me Not)
3. Xiǎng yīgè nánshēng (想一個男生 Thinking of Him)
4. Gēngyī shì (更衣室 changing room)
5. Guǎngdǎo zhī liàn (廣島之戀 Hiroshima Mon Amour)
6. Snacks
7. Diàntái qínggē (電台情歌 Radio Love Song)
8. Wǔyè qián de shí fēnzhōng (午夜前的十分鐘 Ten Minutes Before Midnight）
9. Xìntú (信徒 Devoted)
10. Live for Romance
11. Zhǐyǒu bīngqílín de zhúguāng wǎncān (只有冰淇淋的燭光晚餐 A Candlelight Dinner With Only Ice Cream)
12. Chāi xìn (拆信 Letter Opening)
13. Love Yourself ài zìjǐ (愛自己 Love Yourself)

== See also ==
- List of best-selling albums in Taiwan
