= Karen Mok in Totality =

Studio album by Karen Mok
- Released: October 1996
- Recorded: 1995–1996
- Genre: Cantopop
- Length: 50:43
- Label: Rock Records

Karen Mok chronology
| Karen (1993) | Karen Mok in Totality (1996) | To Be (1997) |

Karen Mok in Totality (Chinese: 全身莫文蔚; pinyin: Quánshēn Mò wén wèi) is a 1996 Cantonese language pop album by Karen Mok. It was released in October 1996 by Rock Records. A version for Mandarin markets with a more decorous cover showing only Mok's face was released for mainland China and Taiwan, though Mok's first album specifically created for, and achieving great success in the Mandarin markets, did not come till the following year with To Be.

== Track listing (Cantonese version) ==
Sung in Cantonese, but transcription in Mandarin pinyin

1. Cháoshī 潮湿 Damp
2. Qíngrén kàn jiàn 情人看剑 Lover to see the sword
3. Sèqíng nánnǚ 色情男女(Karen独唱版) Erotica
4. Fēirén shēnghuó 飞人生活(一) Trapeze life
5. Fú shā 浮沙 Quicksand
6. Wǒ bù xūyào liánmǐn 我不需要怜悯 I do not need pity
7. Àilìsī yǒngyuǎn zhù zài zhèlǐ 爱丽丝永远住在这里 Alice lives here forever
8. Lǎo dìfāng 老地方 Old place
9. Shuí hé shuí 谁和谁 Whom and who
10. Fēirén shēnghuó 飞人生活(二) Trapeze life 2
11. Bǐ yè gèng hēi 比夜更黑 Blacker than night
12. Wèiliǎo qíng 未了情 Unfinished love
13. Dàole wǎnshàng 到了晚上 When evening comes
14. Zěnmele 怎么了 How?
15. Fēirén shēnghuó 飞人生活(三) Trapeze life (three)
