= Song Wenshan =

Taiwanese talent manager

Song Wenshan (Chinese: 宋文善) is one of the first generation of Taiwanese talent managers. In 1988, through the TV mode, he founded the Nicky Wu, Banny Chen, Alec Su these three Youth Sunshine Boy "Xiao Hu Dui" (The Little Tigers), became fashionable for a time, the achievements are still read the Chinese music scene in the first idol group. Before "The Little Tigers", he did the auxiliary work. He has also worked for Teresa Teng, Liu Wen-cheng, Feng Feifei, Tsai Chin and other music superstars.

== Early life ==
Song grew up in southern Taiwan, and was admitted to Taipei to go to university. Since then the home economic condition is not very good, his record company part-time when film packaging to subsidize life. His father is a music lover, listening to the Shanghai thirty-four's move, white light, love opera, so the childhood made him fall in love with music. But he felt his appearance condition is not good enough, so he chose to be behind the record company.

In 1975 the army back, Song after a friend introduced a friend into the record companies to do publicity, did not think 2 years for him to pop diva Teresa Teng. The 15 annual expenditure records, the same age Song is her small fan, "I can't believe I dream of idol in front of me, even a feeling of fear." He recalled that the case is still very clear, "but Teresa Teng know, if she feared that her wrong, so she tries various devivies to let me not be afraid that is, much more difficult? At that time, she was very major suit, a super day, and I'm just small enterprise promotion. She is very kind, very polite to me, but her relationship, her movie resources are safely delivered to me. She is really modest. I learned her singing, she learned her speech, she treats people, be strict with oneself generous to others. So, until now I still very grateful to her."

From 1975 to 1988, it's the birth of Xiao Hu Dui. He has been the role "Enterprise mission". During that time, he honed his entertainment experience, thinking with the singer how to develop contact with the media. These are the embryonic form of the broker. "But when the media in Taiwan is not much, the singer doesn't need breakout, recorded on the TV play songs on the radio album, visiting it."

Talk about the birth of Xiao Hu Dui, Song said that it was influenced by Japanese entertainment. Then in 1988, through the TV "Draft by the way", he found Nicky Wu, Banny Chen and Alec Su. The three Youth Sunshine Boy form the success of "Xiao Hu Dui" (The Little Tigers), they became fashionable for a time, still be regarded as Taiwan's No.1 male idol group.
