= Yoo Ha-na =

South Korean actress (born 1986)

- Born: Yoo Ha-na; March 22, 1986 (age 40); Seoul, South Korea
- Occupation: Actress
- Years active: 2007–present
- Height: 1.69 m (5 ft 6 1/2 in)
- Spouse: Lee Yong-kyu (m. 2011)
- Children: 2

Korean name
- Hangul: 유하나
- Hanja: 劉荷娜
- RR: Yu Hana
- MR: Yu Hana

Yoo Ha-na (Korean: 유하나; born March 22, 1986) is a South Korean actress. She has starred alongside Jimmy Lin in the Taiwanese TV drama series My Lucky Star, and has also appeared in the music video for "White Windmill" by Taiwanese singer Jay Chou.

== Personal life and career ==
Born in Seoul, South Korea, Yoo Ha-na originally got her start in the entertainment business by posing for pictures in various magazines in South Korea. One of Yoo's photos caught the eye of Chen Yu-shan (producer for the Taiwanese drama My Lucky Star) from a magazine she picked up while at a beauty salon. Chen made arrangements afterwards with Yoo's agent to fly Yoo from South Korea to Taiwan to audition for My Lucky Star, which landed Yoo the lead female role in that drama. At the time, Yoo had already appeared in the music video "White Windmill" for Taiwanese singer Jay Chou.

Yoo went on to appear in a few Taiwanese films such as Exit No. 6 before returning to South Korea, where she starred in TV dramas such as My Too Perfect Sons, First Wives' Club, and Paradise Ranch.

On December 17, 2011, Yoo married professional baseball player Lee Yong-kyu. She delivered a 3 kg son in September 2013. Her agency announced that she decided to suspend her acting career for the time being to focus on raising her son and taking care of her family.

== Filmography ==
=== Television ===
Television
Year	Title	Role	Notes	With
2007	My Lucky Star	Xia Zhi Xing "Ah Xing"	Lead Role	Jimmy Lin
2007	First Wives Club	Choi Hyun-sil	Supporting Role	Lee Joon-hyuk
2009	My Too Perfect Sons	Oh Eun-ji	Main Cast	N/A
2011	Paradise Ranch	Park Jin-young	Main Cast	None
2011	Lie to Me	Herself/Cameo	Guest	None

=== Film ===
Film
Year	Title	Role	Notes	With
2004	Wo Ye Hui Lai Le	N/A	N/A	N/A
2006	Exit No. 6	Fion	Main Cast	None

== Theatre ==
- Mad Kiss (2007)
- Dead Poet Society (2007)
- Monday P.M. (2008)

=== Musical theatre ===
- Oh! While You Were Sleeping (2005)
- Our Town (2006)
- Greese (2008)
- Wait for You (2009)
