= School Days (1995 film) =

1995 Taiwan teen drama film

- School Days original Taiwan release poster
- Traditional Chinese: 學校霸王
- Simplified Chinese: 学校霸王
- Hanyu Pinyin: Xuéxiào Bàwáng
- Wade–Giles: Hsüeh2-hsiao4 Pa4-wang2
- Directed by: Kevin Chu
- Written by: Lin Cheng-hsin; Yun Chiao Yeh
- Produced by: Hui Pei-yung; Lin Li-Yin
- Starring: Jimmy Lin; Takeshi Kaneshiro; Ruby Lin; Franco Jiang; Chin Ho
- Cinematography: Liang Shu-nan
- Edited by: Chen Bo-Wen
- Music by: Huang Chuo-Ying
- Production companies: Chang-Hong Channel Film & Video Co.
- Distributed by: Mei Ah Entertainment
- Release date: April 27, 1995 (Taiwan)
- Running time: 89 minutes
- Country: Taiwan
- Languages: Mandarin; Cantonese dubbed
- Box office: HK $271,776.00

School Days (Chinese: 學校霸王; pinyin: Xuéxiào Bàwáng) is a 1995 Taiwan teen drama film distributed for Hong Kong and Taiwan. It stars Jimmy Lin, Takeshi Kaneshiro, Ruby Lin, Franco Jiang and Chin Ho, and was directed by Kevin Chu. The original Taiwan release title of the film was "Campus Squad" (校園敢死隊, Xiàoyuán Gǎnsǐduì); the film was retitled for its Hong Kong release and dubbed in Cantonese to appeal to the Hong Kong audience.

== Plot ==
Hui Chi Ho (Jimmy Lin) comes from a well to do family. On the first day at his new school he has the family chauffeur drop him off at school. Everyone at school is in awe of the new rich and handsome student. Chi Ho likes his new school and class a lot since the prettiest girl at school Xin Fu "Princess" (Ruby Lin) is in the same class as him. Crow (Franco Jiang) and his small gang immediately target Chi Ho for protection money. Chi Ho refuses to pay and does not tell his parents about being bullied at his new school since he does not want to be treated special by the school administrators. Crow and his gang wait for Chi Ho after school everyday to harass him for money and beat him up.

One day another new student with a bad rep sheet arrives, Eagle (Takeshi Kaneshiro). He has been expelled from all his previous schools. The school dean makes it clear to Eagle that if he gets in trouble he will be expelled immediately. Eagle is put in the same class as Chi Ho, Princess and Crow. Everyone at school is afraid of him since he was rumored to have served prison time for killing someone. Eagle immediately notices that Chi Ho is being bullied by Crow and his gang on his first day. He decides to protect Chi Ho and soon the two become good friends. Chi Ho finds out about Eagle's past and realizes that his bad rep from his previous schools comes from fighting while protecting the weak from bullies.

Crow and his gang does not dare to offend Eagle and soon the school is no longer afraid of Crow and his gang. Crow not being able to stand that he no longer has control of school hires outside triad member Bull (Chin Ho) to teach Eagle a lesson. Bull and his gang beats up and destroys Eagle's motorbike at school. Not wanting to go through the cycle he went through in his previous schools Eagle does not fight back and decides to no longer attend school. Crow thinking he has won and rid of Eagle soon finds out his plan has backfired as Bull and his gang tell him that they want control him and the school.

Crow in desperate need of help teams up with Chi Ho to rebuild Eagle's motorbike and begs Eagle to return to school to help rid the Triad gang from their school. Crow, Chi Ho and some of their friends agree to meet and fight Bull and his gang under an expressway overpass to settle things. Chi Ho, Crow and their friends are no match for Bull and his gang, just when the classmates think they have lost the fight, Eagle arrives and beats up Bull and his members.

All of the classmates become friends and the school is finally peaceful. The movie ends with all who were involve in the fight thinking they're in trouble with the school dean because of fighting with outsiders, but the school dean has decided to let it slide seeing how they were protecting the school.

== Casts ==
- Jimmy Lin as Hui Chi Ho (Chinese: 許志浩; pinyin: Xǔ Zhìhào)
- Takeshi Kaneshiro as Eagle (老鷹; Lǎoyīng; 'Eagle')
- Ruby Lin as Xin Fu "Princess" (公主; Gōngzhǔ; 'Princess')
- Franco Jiang as Crow (烏鴉; Wūyā; 'Crow')
- Chin Ho (秦豪; Qín Háo) as Bull (鐵牛; Tiě Niú; 'Iron Bull')
- Jue Ga-Lun as the class nerd
- Wong Yuk-Yin as Princess's friend
- Cheung Laap-Wai as Fatty (Crow's gang)
- Lo Suk-Fong as Homeroom teacher
- Tin Ping-Chun as School dean
- Lee Cheung-On as Chi Ho's father
- Lee Yan as Chi Ho's mother

== Facts ==
Cover of DVD release

- The movie was actually filmed and released in Taiwan in 1994, but due to Jimmy Lin's popularity and massive following during the mid-1990s in Hong Kong the movie was renamed and dubbed in Cantonese for release in Hong Kong in 1995.
- Jimmy Lin was the most popular teen idol in Taiwan and Hong Kong during the production of the movie.
- One of Takeshi Kaneshiro earliest films, before he became an international superstar.
- This is Ruby Lin's debut film.
- Jimmy Lin and Ruby Lin met while working together on this film and started dating in real life during filming.
- By the time the DVD was released for the movie, Jimmy Lin was serving his mandatory 2 year government army term. Takeshi Kaneshiro, who was not required to serve a Taiwan army term because he is a Japanese citizen, had surpassed Lin in popularity and his image was enlarged to show as the star on the DVD cover instead.
