= Forever Friends (film) =

- Forever Friends HK DVD cover
- Traditional Chinese: 四個不平凡的少年, 號角響起
- Simplified Chinese: 四个不平凡的少年, 号角响起
- Jyutping: Sei goh bat ping faan dik siu nin
- Directed by: Kevin Chu
- Written by: Wu Nien-jen
- Produced by: Hui Pooi-Yung
- Starring: Nicky Wu; Alec Su; Takeshi Kaneshiro; Jimmy Lin
- Cinematography: Chan Shu-Wing
- Edited by: Chen Bo-Wen; Mui Tung-Lit
- Production companies: Chang Hong Channel Film & Video Ltd. Co. (HK)
- Distributed by: Upland Films Corporation Limited; Mei Ah Entertainment
- Release dates: 11 August 1995 (Taiwan); 23 March 1996 (Hong Kong)
- Running time: 83 minutes
- Country: Taiwan
- Languages: Mandarin; Cantonese
- Box office: HK$149,270

Forever Friends or "號角響起" (lit: "sound the horns"; pinyin: Hao jiao xiang qi) is a 1995 Taiwanese war-comedy film directed by Kevin Chu, starring Taiwan's popular "four little heavenly kings" (Nicky Wu, Alec Su, Takeshi Kaneshiro and Jimmy Lin). With the raising popularity of the "four little heavenly kings" in Hong Kong, the Mandarin Chinese-language film was released in Hong Kong in 1996, under the new Cantonese title "四個不平凡的少年" (Sei goh bat ping faan dik siu nin). It was dubbed in Cantonese, and the more comical title literally translates to "four uncommon young men", to cater to Hong Kong audiences.

== Plot ==
Because of rumors of China invading Taiwan, tensions rise on both sides in fear of war. Taiwan, to demonstrate its military power and prepare for war, gives its troops strict combat training. Private Luo Zhi-Jiang has taken the college entrance exam three times without passing. Unable to enter any university, he is forced to serve his army term. As the army DJ in his former unit, he accidentally played the wrong song over the loud speaker and was sent to Special Squad. He is physically weak, which makes it hard for him to complete most of his training tasks.

Captain Li Wei-Han arrives as the newly appointed captain of the "Special Squad" unit, which consist of misfits and rejects from other army units. He is young for his ranking, and others mistake him for a private at first.

Private Li Ta-Wei is a former triad member with a tattoo on his shoulder. Because of his history and appearance, he is stereotyped by others. He served a two-year prison sentence for a gang-related killing, and regrets his past because his triad boss never visited him while he was in jail. He thinks that no one will ever want to be friends with him and that he will never be respected as a human being. He has a hot temper and gets into fights with a taekwondo expert from another unit.

Private Zeng Zhi-Xiang is a fortune teller and wizard, able to put curses on people. He has two wives back home. He was transferred to the Special Squad because while trying to get on the good side of his previous captain, he gave him lucky numbers to bet on. They did not work and caused the captain to lose money. While punishing Zhi-Xiang with intense training and yelling, the captain had an epileptic seizure. No one else believes it was a seizure and think that Zhi-Xiang put an hex on the captain.

Due to Zhi-Jiang's clumsiness during training, Captain Li is scolded for inadequately training his unit. The Special Squad is labelled the Cheerleading Squad by the captain's superiors and made fun of by the other squads. On the first official day of training, he is embarrassed in front of his superiors when his unit does not arrive at the finish point, but rather falls asleep in the middle of the training field.

During a visit from the colonel, Zhi-Jiang is asked about his feelings about the army. He tells the colonel how he feels and is scolded for crying about the squad's poor performance and his guilt about their captain's kindness. A soldier from another squad is also questioned and tells the colonel about how much he enjoys army life. The colonel then orders a form for voluntary enlistment to be brought to the soldier. Not wanting to extend his service, the private admits to lying. Furious, the colonel tells all the officers that they should be truthful and encourage truthfulness in their soldiers.

During a mock war exercis, Luo, Li, Zeng and Wei are assigned to distribute water to the troops on their team. While driving around the training grounds, they encounter vehicles from the rival team. Not wanting to surrender or accept being "killed", they fight with bayonets and announce they would fight to their deaths. The captain on the rival team tells his troops to drive on. The four then go into town and visit Zhi-Xiang's home. After a meal, he stays overnight to be with his wives and perform wizardry, while the others visit Ta-Wei's mother.

In the morning, returning to the army base, they stop to buy breakfast and run into the top military personnel from the rival team and the official judge of the war games. Since the superiors were eating and not prepared for combat, the four politely tie them with rope and bring them back to camp as hostages, winning the mock war for their team.

Encouraged by their behavior, the captain signs them up to sing military training songs in a competition. They practice singing so loudly that they end up hoarse on competition day, but win a Most Improved award.

== Cast ==
- Nicky Wu as Captain Li Wei-Han
- Alec Su as Private Luo Zhi-Jiang
- Takeshi Kaneshiro as Private Li Ta-Wei
- Jimmy Lin as Private Zeng Zhi-Xiang
- Wu Ming as Ta-Wei mother
- Cheung Laap-Wai as Private Wei Yu-nan
- Wang De-Zhi as Army Sergeant
- Cheung Ching-Yung as Private Li Wei Hon

== Production ==
Taiwan theatrical poster showing original movie title.

The film was commissioned by the Republic of China Army to serve as a training guide in army life, since Taiwan has an compulsory military service.

Jimmy Lin was the more popular of the "four little heavenly kings" and had an established fan base in Hong Kong in the mid 1990s. After the filming, Lin was required to serve his compulsory military service, which saw his popularity in both Taiwan and Hong Kong diminish when the film was released in Hong Kong.

After the finish of filming, the popular Taiwanese boyband Xiao Hu Dui, of which Nicky Wu and Alec Su were members, officially disbanded. The former members embarked on solo careers.

The film was released in Japan with Takeshi Kaneshiro billed as the main star due to his growing popularity in the country.

== Production credits ==
- Production Manager: Lee Ging-Suen, Chan Gei-Yuen
- Assistant Director: Chung Bing-Wong, Chui Gwok-Yin
- Art Director: Lu Chun
- Script Supervisor: Kelly Mang Cheung-Lee
- Lighting: Choi Sam-Kat
- Costume Designer: Lok Sai-Gwong
- Makeup: Yau Yee-Chu
- Props: Lam Sing-Kwok
- Presenter: Ng Dui
