= My Girl (2005 TV series) =

2005 South Korean television series

- Hangul: 마이걸
- RR: Maigeol
- MR: Maigŏl
- Genre: Romance; Comedy; Drama
- Written by: Hong Jung-eun; Hong Mi-ran
- Directed by: Jeon Ki-sang
- Starring: Lee Da-hae; Lee Dong-wook; Lee Joon-gi; Park Si-yeon
- Opening theme: "첨부터 (From the Start)" by Yeon Woo
- Ending theme: "Never Say Goodbye" by Mario and Nesty
- Country of origin: South Korea
- Original language: Korean
- No. of episodes: 16

Production
- Executive producer: Kim Young-sup
- Producer: Bae Tae-sup
- Production locations: Jeju Island; Seoul
- Running time: 60 minutes Wednesdays and Thursdays at 21:55 (KST)
- Production companies: DSP Media; Kallista

Original release
- Network: Seoul Broadcasting System
- Release: December 14, 2005 – February 2, 2006

Related
- My Girl (2008); Rainbow Sweetheart

My Girl (Korean: 마이걸; RR: Maigeol) is a 2005 South Korean television series starring Lee Da-hae, Lee Dong-wook, Lee Joon-gi, and Park Si-yeon. A joint production of Kallista Co. Ltd. and DSP Entertainment (now DSP Media), it aired on SBS from December 14, 2005 to February 2, 2006 on Wednesdays and Thursdays at 21:55 for 16 episodes. The romantic comedy series was a hit during its run—it placed number one in its timeslot and reached a peak viewership rating of 24.9%. It also catapulted actors Lee Da-hae, Lee Dong-wook and Lee Joon-gi into the Korean wave stardom.

== Synopsis ==
A native of Jeju Island, Joo Yoo-rin lives with her father, who is addicted to gambling. Because of her father's debts, Yoo-rin has become particularly skilled at lying and grifting. When her father escapes the island to hide from his debtors, Yoo-rin is determined to support herself and clear up the debts. One day, she meets Seol Gong-chan, the sole heir to the L'Avenue Hotel fortune.

To grant his grandfather's dying wish, Gong-chan employs Yoo-rin to act as his grandfather's long-lost granddaughter. Offering a monthly salary plus a bonus, he asks her to do what she does best—to put on an act. Not wishing to lie to a dying man, yet desperate for the money, Yoo-rin takes the offer and starts playing the long-lost granddaughter. Through a strange twist of fate, however, finding his granddaughter makes the grandfather so happy that he makes a complete recovery. Since they have claimed to be cousins, Gong-chan and Yoo-rin are forced to live together under one roof, and as time passes, the attraction between them grows. However, love is forbidden for these two, who must pass as cousins...

== Cast ==
=== Main ===
- Lee Da-hae as Joo Yoo-rin

A tour guide in charge of running mini tours in Jeju Island. Her father is a gambling addict, but despite all the debts that he runs up, Yoo-rin always finds a way to help repay them. She leads a below-average life but is happy as long as she has her father with her. Because of her father's gambling ways, she has had to move from country to country whenever her father runs from one place to another to avoid their debtors. This has in turn brought her the ability to converse fluently in Chinese and Japanese, which are of great help as a tour guide whenever she has to entertain tourists from China and Japan.

- Lee Dong-wook as Seol Gong-chan

The only heir of the owner of L'Avenuel Hotel, which is one of the top hotels in Korea. His grandfather, Seol Woong, charges him with the duty of finding his granddaughter, who is Gong-chan's cousin.

- Lee Joon-gi as Seo Jung-woo

The son of one of the major shareholders of L'Avenuel Hotel, and Gong-chan's best friend. Unlike Gong-chan who is responsible and hardworking, Jung-woo is a playboy who is known to have many girlfriends.

- Park Si-yeon as Kim Se-hyun

Gong-chan's ex-girlfriend. A rising star in the tennis world, she returns to Korea hoping to reconcile with Gong-chan.

=== Supporting ===
- Jo Kye-hyung as Ahn Jin-gyu
- Hwang Bo-ra as Ahn Jin-shim
- Byun Hee-bong as Seol Woong (Gong-chan's grandfather)
- Ahn Suk-hwan as Jang Il-do
- Choi Ran as Bae In-sun (Gong-chan's maiden aunt)
- Lee Sa-bi as Yoon Jin-kyung
- Kim Yong-rim as Jang Hyung-ja (Jung-woo's mother)
- Jung Han-heon as Joo Tae-hyung (Yoo-rin's father)
- Oh Ji-young as Se-hyun's assistant/traveling companion
- Han Chae-young as Choi Ha-na (the real granddaughter, cameo)
- Jae Hee as Lee Mong-ryong (Ha-na's husband, cameo)

== Ratings ==
Date	Episode	Nationwide	Seoul
2005-12-14	1	14.6% (8th)	18.8% (6th)
2005-12-15	2	15.7% (8th)	17.0% (5th)
2005-12-21	3	16.5% (5th)	17.5% (4th)
2005-12-22	4	18.8% (4th)	19.9% (4th)
2005-12-28	5+6	20.3% (3rd)	21.7% (3rd)
2006-01-04	7	22.8% (2nd)	24.2% (2nd)
2006-01-05	8	23.3% (2nd)	25.0% (2nd)
2006-01-11	9	21.3% (3rd)	22.1% (2nd)
2006-01-12	10	24.1% (2nd)	24.7% (2nd)
2006-01-18	11	21.0% (5th)	22.1% (4th)
2006-01-19	12	24.3% (2nd)	26.0% (2nd)
2006-01-25	13	21.1% (3rd)	23.1% (3rd)
2006-01-26	14	23.5% (3rd)	22.8% (3rd)
2006-02-01	15	23.2% (3rd)	23.7% (3rd)
2006-02-02	16	24.9% (3rd)	26.0% (3rd)
Average		19.7%	20.7%

== Awards ==
2005 SBS Drama Awards

- Excellence Award, Actress in a Drama Special: Lee Da-hae

2006 SBS Drama Awards

- Top 10 Stars: Lee Da-hae
- New Star Award: Park Si-yeon
