= A Home Too Far =

- DVD cover
- Traditional Chinese: 異域
- Simplified Chinese: 异域
- Hanyu Pinyin: Yì Yù
- Jyutping: Ji6 Wik6
- Directed by: Kevin Chu
- Written by: Shiao Yun-chiao; Yeh Yun-chiao; Chang Kwang-dou; Lin Ching-sin
- Based on: The Alien Realm by Bo Yang
- Produced by: Jimmy Heung; Wallace Cheung
- Starring: Andy Lau; Tou Chung-hua; Ko Chun-hsiung
- Cinematography: Chen Yung-shu
- Edited by: Huang Cheng-chang; Chou Te-yang
- Music by: Ricky Ho
- Production companies: Yen Ping Films Production; Movie Impact
- Distributed by: Scholar Films Company Limited
- Release date: 28 August 1990
- Running time: 122 minutes
- Country: Republic of China
- Language: Mandarin

A Home Too Far is a 1990 Taiwanese war drama film directed by Kevin Chu, starring Andy Lau, Tou Chung-hua and Ko Chun-hsiung. The film is based on Bo Yang's novel, The Alien Realm, which is the story of the Republic of China Army's 93rd Division taking refuge in Santikhiri (Mae Salong) on the border between Myanmar and Thailand.

== Plot ==
In the early 1950s, the Chinese Civil War has ended with the defeat of Republic of China and the establishment of the People's Republic of China by the communists. Soldiers from the 93rd Division of the Republic of China Army take their families with them and leave southwestern China by entering northern Burma (Myanmar). The hike through the jungle is full of disasters and shortages of supplies, but the survivors reach and settle within the China–Burma border. They build a village and form an alliance with a local armed gang to resist attacks from the Burmese government. Later, the relocated government of the Republic of China offers to take the soldiers and their families to Taiwan, but some are disappointed with the government and decide to stay.

== Cast ==
- Andy Lau as Little Tu/Hua Chung-hsing
- Tou Chung-hua as Deng Ke-pao
- Ko Chun-hsiung as General Li Kuo-hui
- Ku Feng as General Li Mi
- Siqin Gaowa as Li Kuo-hui's wife

== See also ==
- Andy Lau filmography
- Chiang Kai-shek
- Kuomintang in Burma
