= My Too Perfect Sons =

- Promotional poster
- Also known as: The Sons of Sol Pharmacy House
- Genre: Family; Romance; Comedy; Drama
- Written by: Jo Jung-sun
- Directed by: Lee Jae-sang
- Starring: Son Hyun-joo; Lee Pil-mo; Han Sang-jin; Ji Chang-wook
- Country of origin: South Korea
- Original language: Korean
- No. of episodes: 54

Production
- Production location: Korea
- Running time: 60 minutes Saturdays and Sundays at 19:55 (KST)
- Production companies: Samhwa Networks; Hunus Entertainment

Original release
- Network: Korean Broadcasting System
- Release: 11 April – 11 October 2009

My Too Perfect Sons (Korean: 솔약국집 아들들; RR: Soryakgukjip adeuldeul; lit. 'The Sons of Sol Pharmacy House') is a 2009 South Korean television series starring Son Hyun-joo, Lee Pil-mo, Han Sang-jin, Ji Chang-wook, Park Sun-young, Yoo Sun, Yoo Ha-na, Kang Eun-bi, Byun Hee-bong, Baek Il-seob, Yoon Mi-ra, Kim Yong-gun, Kim Hye-ok, Cho Jin-woong and Choi Ji-na. It aired on KBS2 from April 11 to October 11, 2009 on Saturdays and Sundays at 19:55 for 54 episodes.

== Plot ==
The Song family is headed by patriarch Kwang-ho and spunky mother Ok-hee. They have four sons—Jin-poong, Dae-poong, Sun-poong and Mi-poong. Ok-hee has doted on her four sons all their lives, but has interfered with their relationships when deeming the girlfriends "not good enough" for her perfect sons. Now she despairs that they are growing older and will never marry.

Eldest son Jin-poong is nearing his 40th birthday. He's a pharmacist whose store is in the same neighbourhood as his home. His personality is shy and awkward around women, although he's a gentle and caring person. He's never quite gotten over his first love Kim Hye-rim, and feels conflicted when she moves back to her childhood home across the street from the pharmacy, along with her husband Brutus and their two children. Then Jin-poong meets Brutus's younger sister Lee Soo-jin, a smart, tough lawyer who graduated Harvard University and got the qualification when Soo-jin resided in California, US.

In contrast to his older brother's cautious and responsible personality, second son Dae-poong is a playboy doctor who gets out of scrapes with his boyish charm. He passed CSAT with the highest score along his colleague and graduated Medical school of Seoul National University. He runs a small Paediatric clinic right above Jin-poong's pharmacy, with one employee, nurse Kim Bok-shil. Bok-shil doesn't have any family and lives by herself in an apartment in the neighbourhood, and comes by to the Song household daily to help their mother cook and clean. Dae-poong takes Bok-shil for granted, not knowing that she's a little bit in love with him.

Third son Sun-poong is a vegetarian and animal-lover who works as a news reporter at broadcast station KBC. He's earnest, sweet, honest, and a little dense when it comes to romance. Sun-poong's direct boss, TV station director Oh Young-dal sets him up with his daughter, newcomer actress Eun-ji. Eun-ji has a spoiled princess complex and she doesn't think Sun-poong is her type, but when he doesn't seem interested in her, her ego takes a blow and his obliviousness makes him attractive to her.

The youngest son is 19-year-old Mi-poong, who just graduated from high school and has failed to be accepted to university, so he's in the middle of studying for a retest. He's extremely sensitive, and speaks to everyone in super-formal language. Gifted in sewing and crafts, Mi-poong often gets mocked for being too girly. Mi-poong's best friend Park Yong-chul got a girl, Choi Soo-hee pregnant, and she leaves her five-month-old baby Hana with him. As Yong-chul works multiple jobs to earn money, Mi-poong looks after Hana and grows attached to the baby. When Yong-chul receives his army papers, Mi-poong agrees to take care of Hana until he gets discharged.

== Cast ==
=== Song family ===
- Son Hyun-joo as Song Jin-poong, pharmacist
- Lee Pil-mo as Song Dae-poong, paediatrician who graduated Medical School of Seoul National University with good qualification
- Han Sang-jin as Song Sun-poong, TV reporter
- Ji Chang-wook as Song Mi-poong, student
- Baek Il-seob as Song Kwang-ho, father who is a Civil Engineer
- Yoon Mi-ra as Bae Ok-hee, mother
- Byun Hee-bong as Song Shi-yeol, grandfather

=== Oh family ===
- Yoo Ha-na as Oh Eun-ji, actress
- Kim Yong-gun as Oh Young-dal, father, TV station director
- Kim Hye-ok as Ahn Moon-sook, mother

=== Lee family ===
- Park Sun-young as Lee Soo-jin who is a lawyer and graduated from Harvard College and Harvard University Law School. She has license to practice in both California (US) and Korea
- Cho Jin-woong as Brutus Lee, Soo-jin's brother
- Choi Ji-na as Kim Hye-rim, Brutus's wife
- Joo Hye-rin as Lee Ma-ri, Brutus and Hye-rim's daughter
- Jung Joon-hwi as Lee Sung-jin, Brutus and Hye-rim's son

=== Extended cast ===
- Yoo Sun as Kim Bok-shil/Jennifer Kim, nurse and Surgeon. She has Medical Qualification of Korea and New York State, USA due to her career in US
- Kang Eun-bi as Choi Soo-hee
- Yoon Hee-kyung as Kim Yoo-ra, Dae-poong's girlfriend/Soo-jin's roommate
- Ha Jae-sook as Jo Mi-ran, Ok-hee's niece and an actress
- Kim Joo-hwan as Park Yong-chul, Mi-poong's friend
- Kim Ye-rang as Lee Hye-ri, Eun-ji's assistant
- Song Jong-beom as Mr. Jang, Sun-poong's PD
- Bang Eun-jin as Diana Yoon, fashion designer
- Lee Deok-hee as Lee Eun-jung, hairdresser
- Yoon Young-joon as Dr. Park Hyun-woo
- Yoon Joo-sang as Dr. Kim Yoon-jong, hospital director and father of Boksil
- Seo Yeon-joo as Dr. Kim Mi-yeon, Yoon-jong's daughter
- Go Jung-min as Jung-hee
- Kim Dong-young as Park Yong-chul, Song Mi-poong's friend.
- Jo Yeon-hee as Child's guardian
- Jeon Hee-sun as Yu-ri
- Kim Jin-woo as Sun-poong's son
- Sung Chang-hoon as In-bae

== Awards and nominations ==
Year	Award	Category	Recipient	Result
2009	Korean Culture and Entertainment Awards	Excellence Award, Actress in a Drama	Yoo Sun	Won
2009	KBS Drama Awards	Top Excellence Award, Actor	Son Hyun-joo	Won
2009	KBS Drama Awards	Top Excellence Award, Actress	Yoon Mi-ra	Nominated
2009	KBS Drama Awards	Excellence Award, Actor in a Serial Drama	Lee Pil-mo	Nominated
2009	KBS Drama Awards	Excellence Award, Actor in a Serial Drama	Son Hyun-joo	Nominated
2009	KBS Drama Awards	Excellence Award, Actress in a Serial Drama	Park Sun-young	Nominated
2009	KBS Drama Awards	Excellence Award, Actress in a Serial Drama	Yoo Sun	Won
2009	KBS Drama Awards	Best Supporting Actor	Cho Jin-woong	Nominated
2009	KBS Drama Awards	Best Supporting Actor	Han Sang-jin	Nominated
2009	KBS Drama Awards	Best Supporting Actor	Yoon Joo-sang	Won
2009	KBS Drama Awards	Best Supporting Actress	Kim Hye-ok	Nominated
2009	KBS Drama Awards	Best Writer	Jo Jung-sun	Won
2009	KBS Drama Awards	Popularity Award, Actor	Lee Pil-mo	Nominated
2009	KBS Drama Awards	Popularity Award, Actress	Yoo Sun	Nominated
2009	KBS Drama Awards	Best Couple Award	Lee Pil-mo and Yoo Sun	Won
2010	Golden Rose Awards	Best Soap & Telenovela	My Too Perfect Sons	Nominated
