= My Lucky Star (TV series) =

- Promotional poster by SETTV
- Also known as: 放羊的星星 fāng yáng de xīngxīng
- Genre: Romance, Comedy
- Created by: Chen Yushan (陈玉珊)
- Written by: Du Xinyi (杜欣怡)
- Directed by: Chen Mingzhang
- Starring: Jimmy Lin; Yoo Ha-na; Leon Jay Williams
- Opening theme: "極速愛情" Jisu Aiqing by Shivia Lee
- Ending theme: "對望" Dui Wang by Jimmy Lin
- Country of origin: Republic of China (Taiwan)
- Original language: Mandarin
- No. of episodes: 20

Production
- Executive producers: Fang Xiaoren, Hu Hanxin, Chen Yushan
- Running time: 90 mins (Sundays from 21:30 to 23:15)
- Production company: Sanlih E-Television

Original release
- Network: Taiwan Television (TTV)
- Release: 11 March – 22 July 2007

Related
- Engagement For Love (愛情經紀約); Ying Ye 3 Jia 1

My Lucky Star (Chinese: 放羊的星星; pinyin: fàng yáng de xīngxīng; lit. 'the stars who tend the sheep') is a 2007 drama starring Jimmy Lin, Leon Jay Williams, and Yoo Ha-na. It was produced by Sanlih E-Television and directed by Chen Ming Zhang (陳銘章).

The series was first broadcast in Taiwan on free-to-air Taiwan Television (TTV) from 11 March 2007 to 22 July 2007, every Sunday from 21:30 to 23:15 and cable TV Sanlih E-Television (SETTV) on 17 March 2007 to 28 July 2007, every Saturday at 21:00. The premiere episode on TTV achieved an average rating of 2.24 and peaked at 2.4.

== Synopsis ==
In the beginning, Xia Zhixing (Ah Xing) was a jewelry con artist, posing as various jewellery company representatives to trick customers into purchasing fake goods. Just like the boy who cried wolf, she had told one too many lies. As a result of this, she is caught for covering up for Shisan Ge (the man she ran off and started jewellery conning with many years ago) and is put in jail for a year. But when she crosses paths with Zhong Tianqi, a rebellious young master of a jewellery empire who is on the run having stolen an important jewel called the "Queen Mary" from his father's company, E-shine, the pair gradually become more and more involved with each other, though reluctantly at first. Ah Xing is drawn to him because, unlikely as it is, he seems to be the only one who believes in her. Eventually, several events after they first meet, they fall in love.

However, because Tianqi is from a wealthy background and Ah Xing is not, his father will not let them see each other, provoking Tianqi to leave with Ah Xing in anger and demands he no longer wants to be part of the family company. He inspires Ah Xing to become a jewellery designer after seeing some of the forged copies she has produced, though Tianqi's father does everything he can to separate his son from the girl he sees as nothing but shameful.

Ou Yaruo — a worker at the company who previously had a relationship with Tianqi but then betrayed him by trying to marry his brother, Tianjun, because he was the first young master of Eshine — is also hateful towards Ah Xing as she still has feelings for Tianqi. Tianjun, however, is in love with Ou Yaruo but knows she does not love him back.

Tianqi is a passionate and skilled racer and helps to save the residents of Tomorrow Town (Ah Xing's hometown) from the gang led by Fa Ge, where he is seen as a local hero afterward. After Tianqi is brutally beaten up when they aim to seek revenge on him, Ah Xing agrees on Tianqi's father's orders not to see Tianqi anymore when she sees how much pain he has had to suffer because of her. Tianqi is told he cannot race in the future due to a broken hand.

Once Tianqi has recovered, Ah Xing throws away the blue sapphire earring Tianqi presented to her when they first fell in love to convince him that her feelings now are real. Tianqi searches through the rain for the earring but cannot find it and is then led away by Ou Yaruo when he starts to become agitated. Ah Xing has a change of heart and tries to tell Tianqi she's sorry but the car is already driving away.

Tianqi learns his father is suffering from Parkinson's disease and tries for his family's sake to forget about Ah Xing. But he still has strong feelings for her no matter how hard he tries, so does not and cannot give up on their love. In the end she agrees to meet him at the cable cars in Tomorrow Town as she, too, cannot hide the way she feels. Tianjun drives Ah Xing to meet Tianqi, not realising that Ou Yaruo has tampered with the car as she thought her father would be driving it. The car crashes, killing Tianjun and leaving Ah Xing crawling on her knees to find help. Meanwhile, Tianqi waits for Ah Xing to arrive, which she never does. He finds out about his brother's death and from then on blames Ah Xing for leaving Tianjun to die and breaking his heart. He vows he will never forgive her and will hate her forever.

5 years later, Zhong Tianqi is a changed man. He is now the ruthless young boss of Eshine, and has become very cold and bitter since his brother and father's deaths. Ah Xing is living with her uncle, Guang Ming, and is the guardian of Shisan Ge's 5-year-old daughter, Nini, because he is in prison and cannot look after her. Nini is eager for Ah Xing to accompany her to meet the famous superstar Han Zhiyin who just so happens to have signed a contract with Eshine. Ah Xing agrees to go and as a result ends up winning the chance to spend 8 hours handcuffed to Han Zhiyin.

This leads to Ah Xing and Tianqi becoming reunited after several long years during which he publicly reveals his hate about her and what type of person he has been led to believe she is. He still believes she was the one who killed his brother and vows to find out the truth. However, his old feelings are rekindled and he finds himself falling for her all over again, after the pair are involved in several events together. During this, Han Zhiyin discovers that Tianqi is his older half-brother because of a secret romance between Tianqi's father and Han Zhiyin's mother many years ago. Han Zhiyin feels resentment and jealousy towards Tianqi because Tianqi had been brought up well by their father (who abandoned Han Zhiyin and his mother and wanted nothing to do with them), whereas Han Zhiyin lived most of his life on the streets before becoming a celebrity.

The two newly discovered brothers fight for Ah Xing's love for a while, but Ah Xing tells Han Zhiyin that what he feels for her isn't real and that he is just trying to take what Tianqi has for his own. Tianqi and Ah Xing have a fight about the contract they signed, but it was a misunderstanding. Tianqi was trying to make a new contract with Ah Xing which she could never break. That was to marry Tianqi. Tianqi also learns the truth about that fateful day in which Tianjun died but does not blame Ou Yaruo for it. As they stand by Tianjun's grave, Ou Yaruo allows herself to be escorted away by the police because she says that with Tianjun by her side, she is not afraid. She puts on the wedding ring that Tianjun presented to her before his death and recalls the memory of his proposal.

The drama ends 2 months later where Han Zhiyin is running Eshine and Ah Xing is revealed to be pregnant with Tianqi's child. Han Zhiyin refuses to give Tianqi a 10-month break so easily. He challenges Tianqi to one last car race to determine who will run the company for the next 5 years.

== Cast ==
- Jimmy Lin as Zhong Tianqi (仲天騏)
- Yoo Ha-na as Xia Zhixing (夏之星)
- Hong Xiaoling as Ou Yaruo (歐雅若)
- Leon Jay Williams as Zhong Tianjun (仲天駿)
- Lee Wei as Han Zhiyin (韓志胤)
- Wang Dao as Zhong Wei (仲威)
- Dong Zhicheng as Guang Ming (光明)
- Huang Yurong as Zhao Shisan (趙十三)
- Chen Weimin (陳為民) as Fa Ge (發哥)
- Zheng Xiaohui (鄭曉慧) as He Baozhu (何寶珠)
- Tsai Pei-lin as Jin Shanmei (金善美)
- Guo Shi Lun as Wu Renyao (吳仁耀)
- Niu Chengze
- Meng Tingli (孟庭麗)
- Song Zhiai as Ming Mei (明美) (ep. 01)
- Fu Peici (傅佩慈) as Nini (妮妮)
- Li Zhiqin (李之勤) as Zhong Hua (仲華)
- Cheng Boren (程伯仁) as George
- Lin Yihong as Jason
- Renzo Liu as Hedda

== Soundtrack ==
My Lucky Star

Soundtrack album by Jimmy Lin, Shivia Li, James He
- Released: 11 August 2008
- Genre: Mandopop
- Language: Mandarin
- Label: Decca Records (TW)

My Lucky Star Original TV Soundtrack (放羊的星星 電視原聲帶) was released on 11 August 2008 by Jimmy Lin, Shivia Li and James He under Decca Records (TW). It contains eighteen songs, in which eleven songs are various instrumental versions of the seven original songs. The opening theme song is "Ji Su Ai Qing" or "Extreme Speed of Love" by Shivia Lee, while the ending theme song is by Jimmy Lin entitled "Dui Wang" or "Looking At Each Other".

=== Track listing ===
No.	Title	Singer(s)	Length
1.	"Looking At Each Other Korean ver." (Dui Wang)	Bii
2.	"Extreme Speed of Love" (極速愛情 (Ji Su Ai Qing))	Shivia Li
3.	"Looking At Each Other" (對望 (Dui Wang))	Jimmy Lin
4.	"Paradise"	Shivia Li
5.	"Our Commemoration" (我們的紀念 (Wo Men De Ji Nian))	Shivia Li
6.	"Goodbye My Love"	He Jun Ming
7.	"Be Brave Breaking Up" (堅強分手 (Jian Qiang Fen Shou))	He Jun Ming
8.	"Magnificent Sadness inst." (Hua Li De Bei Shang)
9.	"Keep Me Company in Jail Cell #107 inst." (Pei Wo Zai 107 Hao Lao Fang)
10.	"Whirlpool in the corner of the Eye inst." (Yan Jiao De Xuan Wo)
11.	"Keep the Commemoration inst." (Liu Zhu Ji Nian)
12.	"First Time Goodbye inst." (Goodbye Chu Ti Yan)
13.	"Stars in Heaven inst." (Tian Tang Shang De Xing Xing)
14.	"White Window Screen inst." (Bai Sha Chuang)
15.	"Slow Heated Notes inst." (Man Re Bi Ji)
16.	"Love Paradise inst." (Lian Ai Paradise)
17.	"Underground Racing inst." (An Biao)
18.	"Holy War Lucifer inst." (Sheng Zhan Lu Xi Fa)

== International Broadcast ==
- Philippines - Q-11 dubbed in Tagalog and aired daily at 14:30
- New Zealand - TV9 dubbed in English and aired daily at 12:00, 19:00
- Vietnam - HTV7 dubbed in Vietnamese and aired daily at 17:00
- Thailand - Channel 7 dubbed in Thai and aired Wednesday to Friday at 08:30
