= Takeshi Kaneshiro =

Japanese-Taiwanese actor and singer

- 金城 武
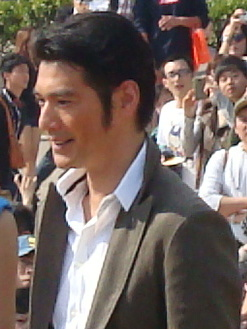
- Kaneshiro in 2011
- Born: October 11, 1973 (age 52); Taipei, Taiwan
- Citizenship: Japan
- Occupations: Actor; singer
- Years active: 1989-present

Chinese name
- Chinese: 金城武
Transcriptions
Standard Mandarin
- Hanyu Pinyin: Jīnchéng Wǔ
Yue: Cantonese
- Jyutping: Gam^{1}-sing^{4} Mou^{5}
Southern Min
- Hokkien POJ: Kim-siâⁿ Bú
- Tâi-lô: Kim-siânn Bú

Japanese name
- Kanji: 金城 武
- Kana: かねしろ たけし
Transcriptions
- Romanization: Kaneshiro Takeshi
- Musical career
- Also known as: Aniki
- Genres: Mandopop; Cantopop
- Instruments: Vocals; guitar

Takeshi Kaneshiro (金城 武, Kaneshiro Takeshi; born October 11, 1973) is a Japanese actor and singer active in the Chinese world. He began his career as a pop idol before shifting his focus to acting. His notable films include Chungking Express (1994), Fallen Angels (1995), House of Flying Daggers (2004), Perhaps Love (2005), The Warlords (2007), Red Cliff (2008), Dragon (2011), and The Crossing (2014–2015).

== Early life ==
Kaneshiro was born and raised in Taipei to a Japanese businessman and a Taiwanese homemaker. He holds Japanese citizenship. Kaneshiro has two elder half-brothers: one who is seven years his senior, and another who is just one year older.

After graduating from Taipei Japanese Junior High School, he enrolled into Taipei American School. During his time at secondary school, Kaneshiro began working in television commercials, and he decided to leave school to pursue a full-time career in music and acting. Kaneshiro is fluent in Mandarin, Hokkien, Japanese and conversational in Cantonese and English.

== Career ==
=== 1992 to 1999: Early years and career breakthrough ===
In 1992, Kaneshiro made his singing debut with the nickname "Aniki", meaning 'older brother' in Japanese. His debut album was Heartbreaking Night (1992). Contracted to EMI, he wrote many of his own Mandarin and Cantonese songs. The following year, his popularity propelled him into acting. He no longer produces any commercial music, although certain notable roles, such as those in Peter Chan’s Perhaps Love (2005) and See You Tomorrow (2016) have required him to sing onscreen.

Kaneshiro made his film debut in Executioners (1993) and this was followed by Wong Kar-wai's Chungking Express (1994), Fallen Angels (1995) and a string of other Hong Kong films, such as Lost and Found (1996), and Anna Magdalena (1998). It was through his collaboration with the auteur director Wong Kar Wai in Chungking Express that Kaneshiro first developed what would become his onscreen signature, namely quirky, character-driven performances that often played against type and ran counter to his idol image. Later, Kaneshiro starred in the Japanese Drama God, Please Give Me More Time (1998), allowing him to branch into Japanese films such as Returner (2002), as well as K-20: Legend of the Mask (2009) and Accuracy of Death (also titled Sweet Rain), (2010).

=== 2000 to 2010: Mainstream success ===
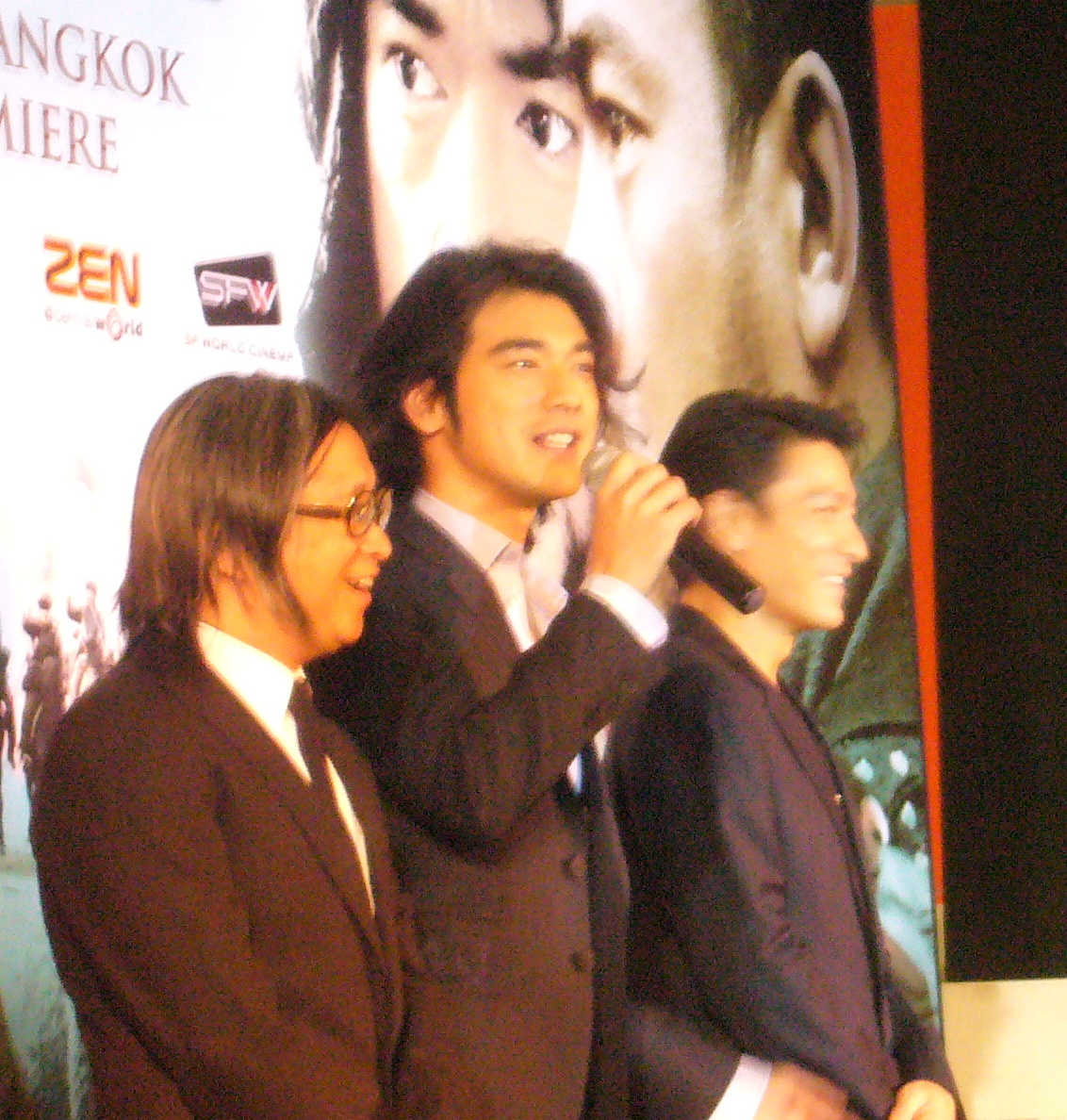
Kaneshiro (center) in 2007 promoting The Warlords, alongside director Peter Chan and co-star Andy Lau

Kaneshiro’s work, however, is more heavily concentrated in China, Hong Kong, and Taiwan. In 2005, he sang his way through Perhaps Love, the first modern musical to be produced in China. It was the first of many collaborations with Hong Kong-based director Peter Chan. In 2008 and 2009 he starred in Red Cliff, a high budget film by Hong Kong director John Woo. He has also played the romantic lead in Zhang Yimou's House of Flying Daggers, and starred alongside Jet Li and Andy Lau in The Warlords. He expressed excitement when he received the news that he would have an opportunity to work with Director Zhang Yimou.

Kaneshiro has become well known in the video game industry portraying the samurai warrior Samanosuke in Capcom's Onimusha. In a June 2007 article on the film site Ain't It Cool News, it was revealed that Kaneshiro was going to be in the Onimusha film, reprising his role as Samanosuke and for a 2011 release, but that project was derailed. The producer Samuel Hadida had to delay the filming of Onimusha, which has resulted in the film's Japanese cast working on other film projects during the delay, and being unavailable to start filming. These factors were enough that French director Christophe Gans will now direct an adaptation of Leo Perutz's novel The Swedish Cavalier first, taking over the reins from Gilles Mimouni. Satomi Ishihara and Tsuyoshi Ihara remain attached to the project.

In 2003, Kaneshiro was featured in Time magazine and was dubbed the Johnny Depp of the East Asian film industry. Moreover, Kaneshiro was interviewed by journalist Hugh Riminton for CNN in the network’s TalkAsia segment in 2006.

=== 2011 to present: Selective films ===
In 2011, Kaneshiro appeared in the historical martial arts thriller Dragon, directed by Peter Chan. The film premiered at the 2011 Cannes Film Festival in the Midnight Screenings category.

In 2017, Kaneshiro won the Best Leading Actor at the Golden Screen Awards for his role in the romantic comedy This Is Not What I Expected, directed by Derek Hui and produced by Peter Chan.

Kaneshiro became a member of the Academy of Motion Picture Arts and Sciences in 2018. In that same year, he completed filming for Juno Mak's Sons of the Neon Night, with an ensemble cast that includes Tony Leung Ka Fai, Louis Koo, and Sean Lau. The film was shelved until its release in 2025.

== Personal life ==
Kaneshiro is a practicing Buddhist, having converted in 1997, and has said his mother is also a devout Buddhist. Throughout his career, Kaneshiro has been given titles such as "heartthrob" and "dream guy", but he has maintained a steady sense of humility. Kaneshiro is also known for trying to avoid the media spotlight. He has been quoted as saying:

"If one day I get married and have kids, I will probably be one of those men who really care for the family. I will eat at home every day, and help with the house work and take care of the children."

== Filmography ==
=== Film ===
Year	English title	Original title	Role	Notes/Ref.
1993	Executioners	現代豪俠傳	Chong Hon	
1994	Mermaid Got Married	人魚傳說	Kenji	
1994	The Wrath of Silence	沉默的姑娘	Dr. Patrick Ko	
1994	Chungking Express	重慶森林	Ho Chi-wu, Cop 223	
1994	No, Sir!	報告班長3	Chin Tieh-sheng	
1995	Don't Give a Damn	冇面俾 / 摩登笑探	Tang Chuen-shek	
1995	Young Policemen in Love	新紮師兄追女仔 / 逃學戰警	Chin Ying-chun	
1995	Fallen Angels	墮落天使	He Zhiwu	
1995	China Dragon	中國龍	Tom Hao	
1995	School Days	學校霸王 / 校園敢死隊	Eagle	
1995	Trouble Maker	蠟筆小小生 / 臭屁王	A Miu	
1996	The Feeling of Love	重慶愛情感覺 / 泡妞專家	Hing	
1996	Lost and Found	天涯海角	Worm	
1996	Forever Friends	四個不平凡的少年 / 號角響起	Li Ta-wei	
1996	Dr. Wai in "The Scripture with No Words"	冒險王	Shing	
1996	First Love: The Litter on the Breeze	初纏戀后的二人世界	Lin Chia-tung	
1997	Downtown Torpedoes	神偷諜影	Jackal	
1997	Hero	馬永貞	Ma Wing-ching	
1997	The Odd One Dies	兩個只能活一個	Mo	
1997	Island of Fire 2	火燒島之橫行霸道	Yang Chung	
1997	Misty	—N/a	Takehiro	
1998	Too Tired to Die	—N/a	Kenji	
1998	Fuyajo	不夜城	Kenichi Ryuu	Also titled Sleepless Town
1998	Anna Magdalena	安娜瑪德蓮娜	Chan Kar-fu	
1999	Tempting Heart	心動	Lin Ho-jun	
1999	Tarzan	—N/a	Tarzan	Voice for Cantonese, Mandarin and Japanese versions
2000	Lavender	薰衣草	Angel	
2000	Space Travelers	スペーストラベラーズ	Nishiyama	
2002	Returner	リターナー	Miyamoto	
2003	Turn Left, Turn Right	向左走．向右走	John Liu	
2004	House of Flying Daggers	十面埋伏	Jin	Titled Lovers for the Japanese release
2005	Perhaps Love	如果愛	Lin Jian-dong / Zhang Yang	Titled Winter Song for the Japanese release
2006	Confession of Pain	傷城	Yau Kin-bong	
2007	The Warlords	投名狀	Jiang Wuyang	
2008	Accuracy of Death	死神の精度	Chiba	
2008	K-20: Legend of the Mask	K-20 怪人二十面相・伝	Heikichi Endo	
2008	Red Cliff Part I	赤壁	Zhuge Liang	
2009	Red Cliff Part II	赤壁:決戰天下	Zhuge Liang	
2011	Dragon	武俠	Xu Bai-jiu	
2014	The Crossing	太平輪：亂世浮生	Yan Zekun	
2015	The Crossing 2	太平輪：驚濤摯愛	Yan Zekun	
2016	See You Tomorrow	擺渡人	Guan Chun	
2017	This Is Not What I Expected	喜歡你	Lu Jin	
2025	Sons of the Neon Night	風林火山	Moreton Li	

=== Television ===
Year	English title	Original title	Role	Notes/Ref.
1991	Grass Scholar	草地狀元	Chen Nai-chien	
1995	Colour Of Amour	富士彩色顯人生		
1995	The Miracle on a Christmas Night	聖夜の奇跡	Mr. Bell	
1998	God, Please Give Me More Time	神様、もう少しだけ	Keigo Ishikawa	
2000	Love 2000	二千年の恋	The Assassin / Yurij Maroev	
2002	Golden Bowl	ゴールデンボウル	Shu Akutagawa	

=== Video games ===
Year	Title	Role	Notes
2001	Onimusha: Warlords	Samanosuke Akechi	Voice, Japanese version
2004	Onimusha 3: Demon Siege	Samanosuke Akechi	Voice, Japanese version
2018	Onimusha: Warlords	Samanosuke Akechi	Voice, Japanese version / Guest creator

== Discography ==
=== Studio albums ===
Title	Album details	Track listing
Heartbreaking Nights (分手的夜裡)	Released: September 1992; Language: Mandarin	Track listing: 1. A Summer Affair; 2. Heartbreaking Night; 3. The unlicensed youth 4. Still Love You; 5. Classmate; 6. Comfortable life away 7. Tokyo Blues; 8. 108 Call Me; 9. I do not 10. Distant cherry rain
Just You And Me (只要你和我)	Released: June 1993; Language: Mandarin	Track listing: 1. Just You And Me; 2. Because love you 3. Looking back at you 4. I etc.; 5. Be My Girl ...... Be My Girl....; 6. Love was not sure 7. Kikuko girl 8. Lying eyes 9. Friends; 10. Good night to You
Tender Superman (溫柔超人)	Released: February 1994; Language: Mandarin	Track listing: 1. Tender Superman; 2. Let's Fall In Love; 3. Love Me Once Again; 4. It is not known 5. You Sweetheart; 6. Valentine's Day gift of flowers 7. A Thousand Temptations; 8. The gray sky 9. You; 10. Heart Pain Inside
Ideal Lover (標準情人)	Released: December 1994; Language: Mandarin	Track listing: 1. Standard lover 2. The trouble is you do not want to 3. Let me say to you 4. Blue smile 5. Deciduous season 6. Pure tears 7. I really treasure 8. Courageous say goodbye 9. No love pm 10. Tell Laura I Love Her (remake)
Missed Date (失約)	Released: December 1994; Language: Cantonese	Track listing: 1. Scam; 2. Will love return 3. Lonely and others 4. Paranoia; 5. You want to ever 6. Loving Heart; 7. Love Me Once Again; 8. I see the paradise 9. Love; 10. Cover Girl
Dear My Beloved (給我心愛的人)	Released: June 1995; Language: Cantonese	Track listing: 1. Who can 2. The occasion 3. Love me!; 4. Still love you like before 5. Burning Passion; 6. Dear My Beloved; 7. Sunshine Lover; 8. I do not want to cry 9. With your life 10. Or are you lucky
Secretly Drunk (偷偷的醉)	Released: October 1995; Language: Mandarin	Track listing: 1. I cried to stop carrying 2. Love You Deeply; 3. Don't want to leave 4. And I miss not meet 5. Road Of The Heart; 6. Secretly Drunk; 7. In the summer of love burning 8. Lonely people fear most crying 9. That love 10. Love Rhapsody
No Matter How Hard (多苦都願意)	Released: October 1996; Language: Mandarin	Track listing: 1. No Matter How Hard; 2. I love her with your shadow 3. Green space 4. Capricorn; 5. Happier; 6. A love so much 7. Because of your 8. My tears 9. New Day Of The City; 10. Taipei Aniki

=== Compilation albums ===
Title	Album details	Track listing
Best Collection: Takeshi Kaneshiro's Best Songs (金城武的精選歌集)	Released: June 1998; Language: Mandarin	Track listing: 1. Ideal Lover; 2. No Matter How Hard; 3. Don't Gry Behind My Back; 4. Don't Wanna Be In Trouble; 5. Crazy Love Song; 6. Secretly Drunk; 7. Route To South; 8. Taipei Aniki; 9. Say Goodbye; 10. Love You Deeply; 11. Love Me; 12. Sunshine Lover; 13. Tender Superman; 14. Only You And Me; 15. Road Of The Heart; 16. Heartbreaking Night

=== Soundtrack appearances ===
Title	Year	Album
"Who Are You?" (忘了我是誰) (with Zhou Xun)	2005	Perhaps Love OST
"A Beautiful Story" (美麗故事) (with Ji Jin-hee)	2005	Perhaps Love OST
"Crossroad" (十字街頭) (with Zhou Xun)	2005	Perhaps Love OST
"What If" (假如)	2005	Perhaps Love OST

== Awards and nominations ==
Takeshi Kaneshiro is one of 10 recipients of the 2010 Green Planet Film Award for Ten Best International Actors of the Decade (Asia).

Year	Award	Category	Nominated work	Result
1995	1st Golden Bauhinia Awards	Best Actor	Fallen Angels	Nominated
1998	18th The Television Drama Academy Award	Best Actor	God, Please Give Me More Time	Won
2002	33rd The Television Drama Academy Award	Best Actor	Golden Bowl	Nominated
2006	43rd Golden Horse Awards	Best Original Film Song	Perhaps Love (as performer of song "Crossroad")	Won
2006	7th Changchun Film Festival	Best Actor	Perhaps Love	Nominated
2017	54th Golden Horse Awards	Best Actor	See You Tomorrow	Nominated
2017	2nd Golden Screen Awards	Best Actor	This Is Not What I Expected	Won

== See also ==
- Takeshi Kaneshiro Tree
