= Takeshi Kaneshiro Tree =

Tree in Taiwan

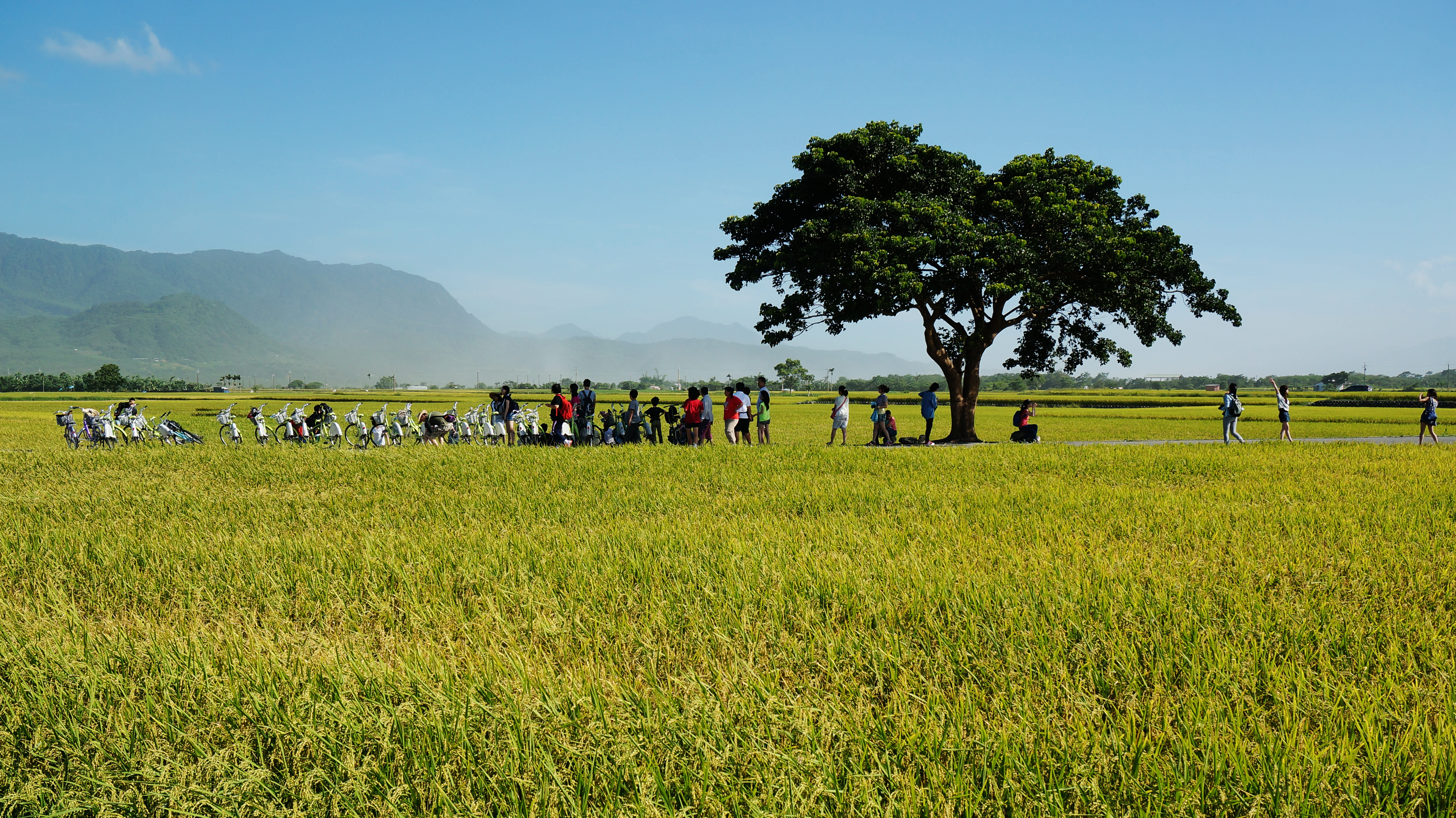
- The original appearance of Takeshi Kaneshiro tree before being blown down by Typhoon Matmo, taken in June 2014

- Location within Taiwan
- Native name: 金城武樹 (Chinese)
- Species: Bishop wood (Bischofia javanica)
- Location: Chishang, Taitung, Taiwan
- Coordinates: 23.097389°N 121.204491°E
- Height: 10 m (33 ft)
- Girth: 10 m (33 ft)

Takeshi Kaneshiro Tree is a bishop wood located on Mr. Brown Avenue, Chihshang Township, Taitung County, Taiwan. Because of advertisements made in June 2013 by EVA Air with Takeshi Kaneshiro in this tree, it was named Takeshi Kaneshiro Tree. Since then, this tree has become a famous landmark attracting countless tourists to visit this place like a pilgrimage. It is estimated that the annual output value of tourism will reach NT$500 million. However, after the increase of tourists, a small number of people littering and destroying of crops by trampling has caused concern by local citizens to the extent that local farmers wanted to cut down the tree.

Takeshi Kaneshiro tree fell during Typhoon Matmo on July 23, 2014. After treatment by Japanese and Taiwanese arborists, the tree has been raised back and gradually restored.

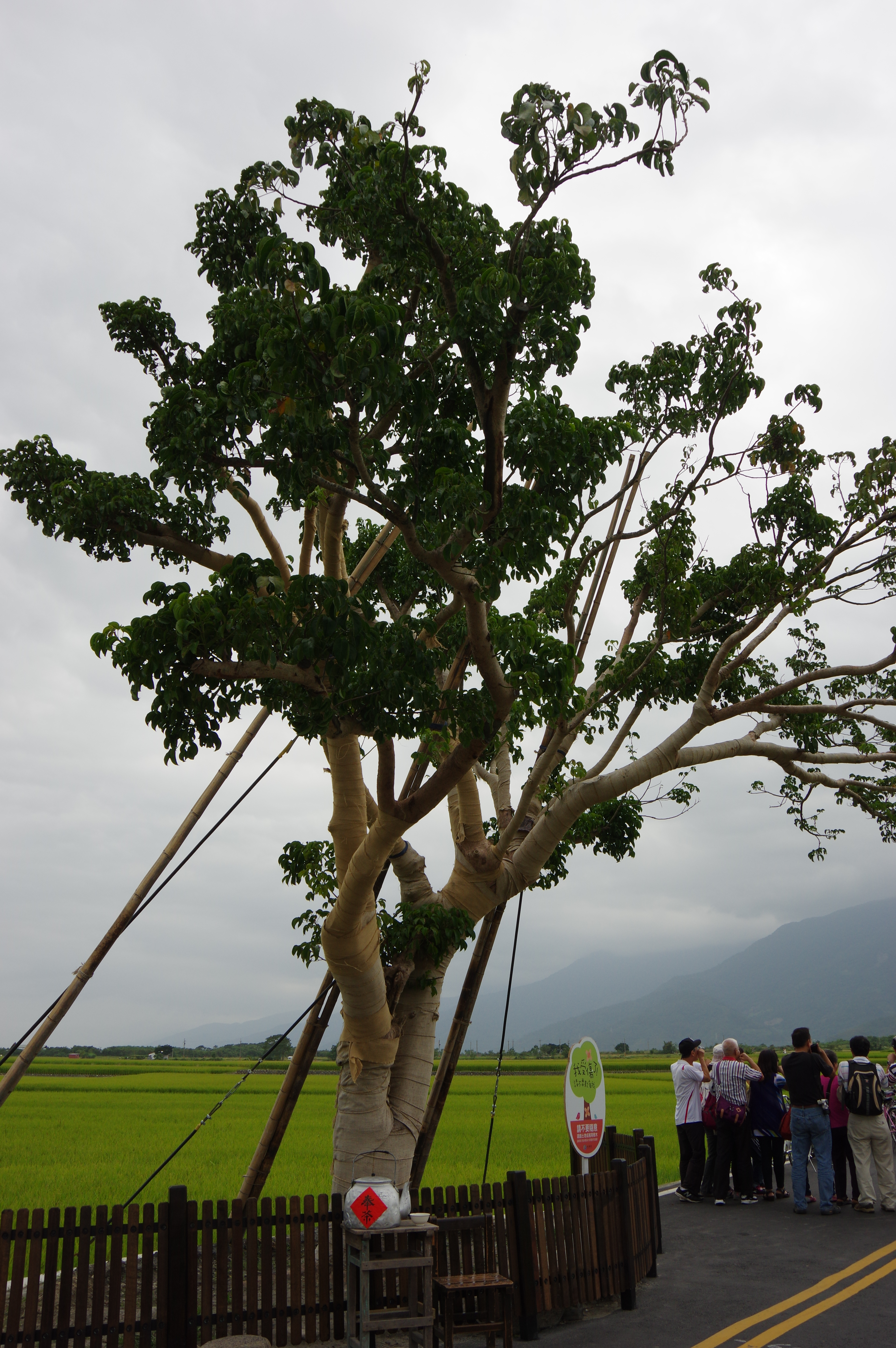
After being blown down by Typhoon Medham, the replanted Takeshi Kaneshiro tree. (Photographed on October 11, 2014)

== See also ==
- List of individual trees
