= Young Policemen in Love =

1995 Taiwanese-Hong Kong film by Kevin Chu

Young Policemen in Love 新紮師兄追女仔
- Young Policemen in Love Taiwan promo poster
- Traditional Chinese: 新紮師兄追女仔
- Simplified Chinese: 新扎师兄追女仔
- Jyutping: Sun Jat Si Hing Zhui Nui Zi
- Directed by: Kevin Chu
- Written by: Kelly Mang Cheung-Lee
- Produced by: Wong Jing
- Starring: Takeshi Kaneshiro; Nicky Wu; Charlie Yeung
- Narrated by: Law Tiu-Wai
- Cinematography: Chan Wing-Shu
- Edited by: Chen Bo-Wen
- Music by: Li Fu
- Production company: Wong Jing's Workshop Ltd.
- Distributed by: Mei Ah Entertainment
- Release date: 1 November 1995 (Taiwan)
- Running time: 82 minutes
- Countries: Taiwan; Hong Kong
- Languages: Mandarin; Cantonese dubbed
- Box office: HK $4,555,698.00

Young Policemen in Love (Chinese: 新紮師兄追女仔; Jyutping: Sun Jat Si Hing Zhui Nui Zi) is a 1995 action comedy film directed by Taiwanese director Kevin Chu and produced by Hong Kong director Wong Jing. Jointly created by Taiwan and Hong Kong, the film stars Taiwanese actor-singer Takeshi Kaneshiro, Nicky Wu and Hong Kong actress-singer Charlie Yeung. The Hong Kong Chinese title 新紮師兄追女仔 literally translates as "Moving Targets Chasing Girls". The movie was first released in Taiwan under the title "Student Men 逃學戰警". The movie was renamed and dubbed in Cantonese to cater to Hong Kong audiences.

== Plot ==
Garlic (Nicky Wu) and Gimmick (Takeshi Kaneshiro) are both young CID police officers who are assigned to crack a drug case. While waiting for their informant at a park, we find out that Garlic is named Garlic because he likes to eat raw garlic, comes from a rich family, and doesn't need to work, but he is a cop because he enjoys his work. Gimmick is dirt poor; he lives off Garlic, and even the clothes and underwear he is wearing belong to Garlic. Both are also extremely arrogant and think they are handsome and God's gift to women.

Their informant is outed and reaches Garlic and Gimmick while he is dying but can tell them where the drugs are located before he dies. Garlic and Gimmick are happy and brag about how they don't have to pay their informant now. They are successful in their drug bust and brag about it on the nightly news by showing off all the drugs they have confiscated from the drug dealers. The drug lord sees the news and is furious; he sends out his thugs to lure Gimmick out of the bar where Garlic and Gimmick are celebrating their drug bust victory. They use an attractive woman to act intimately with Gimmick and then snap pictures of them to blackmail him. Garlic comes out to save Gimmick, and they find a note telling them that they must return the drugs they have confiscated from the drug dealers or else the pictures of Gimmick will be published in the newspapers.

While trying to catch the thugs that set them up, they cause a lot of damage to the city and their supervisor, Police Chief C.K. Wong (Wong Yat Fei), finds out what happened. Garlic and Gimmick don't seem to care and even praise how great Gimmick looks in the blackmail photos. Chief Wong tells them with the mess they have caused, they need to leave the police force for a few years and lie low. He suggests they go undercover on assignment; he gives them three undercover assignments to choose from. The first, go to Thailand and pretend to be transvestites to see if they are involved in drugs or not. They both turn it down, Gimmick saying his mom won't allow him to do that and Garlic saying he would get molested easily. The second, pretend to be gay lovers and investigate a gay club homicide. Both tell the chief "NO" immediately. The third, go to "Wong Fei Hong High School" to protect Kong Mei-lai (Charlie Yeung), the future Hong Kong Police Commissioner's daughter. They have no choice but to accept the 3rd assignment since they turned down the first two.

At school, both Garlic and Gimmick don't seem to fit in with the rest of the other students. The school dean gives a stern lecture on their first day that if they don't do good at school, they will be beaten to a bloody pulp with famous kung fu moves. Both don't care and think the school dean is crazy. Gimmick falls asleep in class and gets beaten to make sure he stays awake. Garlic gets a math answer right but is also beaten because he is too cocky about it. Both are late to class after lunch and get beaten badly. They regret accepting the assignment and try to get transferred to the first two cases instead.

The school dean introduces them to Miss Yip (Yip Chuen Chan), who will be their private tutor since both are the worst students at school. Once the dean leaves, both flirt on Miss Yip immediately until they find out she is also an undercover police officer sent by Chief Wong to make sure they pass their classes. Chief Wong puts both Garlic and Gimmick through torturous courses to make sure they know their school material. Not certain if Garlic and Gimmick will pass their tests, Chief Wong sends in the SWAT team to distract the dean to help Garlic and Gimmick cheat on their tests.

Once they pass their tests, their assignment finally begins when Kong Mei-lai arrives at the school.

== Cast ==
- Takeshi Kaneshiro as Gimmick
- Nicky Wu as Garlic
- Charlie Yeung as Kong Mei-lai
- Wong Yat Fei as Police Chief C.K. Wong
- Yip Chuen Chan as Miss Yip

== Filming location ==
Poster and DVD art for Hong Kong version of the movie

The movie was filmed on location in Taipei, Taiwan, with a mostly Taiwanese cast. The storyline mostly references Hong Kong events and also mentions the handing over of Hong Kong to Mainland China in 1997 in order to cater to the Hong Kong audiences for a bigger box office gross. Takeshi Kaneshiro and Nicky Wu, who were already household names in Taiwan, were unknowns during the mid 1990s in Hong Kong and were looking into crossing over to the Hong Kong market by riding on the popularity of Jimmy Lin, who had a huge following in Hong Kong during that time.

== Production credits ==
- Action Director: Cheung Aau-Tang
- Production Manager: Bowie Lau Bo-Yin, Chow Chik-Gwan
- Lighting: Choi Sam-Kat
- Costume Designer: Lam Chi-Wing
- Makeup: Yau Yee-Chu
- Props: Lam Sing-Kwok
- Car Stunts: Chan Man-Fai
