= Trouble Maker (film) =

1995 Taiwanese-Hong Kong film by Kevin Chu

- Trouble Maker HK promo and DVD poster
- Traditional Chinese: 蠟筆小小生
- Simplified Chinese: 蜡笔小小生
- Jyutping: Laap6 bat1 siu2 siu2 sang1
- Directed by: Kevin Chu
- Written by: Kuo Cheng; Hsin Wei
- Produced by: Wong Jing; Law Tiu-Wai
- Starring: Takeshi Kaneshiro; Ng Man-tat; Athena Chu
- Cinematography: Chan Wing-Shu
- Edited by: Chen Bo-Wen
- Music by: Takeshi Kaneshiro (songs)
- Production company: Wong Jing's Workshop Ltd.
- Distributed by: Mei Ah Entertainment
- Release date: 25 March 1995 (Hong Kong)
- Running time: 85 minutes
- Countries: Taiwan; Hong Kong
- Languages: Mandarin; Cantonese
- Box office: HK $3,955,293.00

Trouble Maker (Chinese: 蠟筆小小生; Jyutping: Laap but siu siu sang) is a 1995 romantic comedy film directed by Taiwanese director Kevin Chu and produced by Hong Kong director Wong Jing. Jointly created by Taiwan and Hong Kong, the film stars Taiwanese actor singer Takeshi Kaneshiro, Hong Kong actor Ng Man-tat, Hong Kong actress Athena Chu and Taiwanese child actor Steven Hao Shao Wen. The Hong Kong Chinese title 蠟筆小小生 translates as "Crayon Siao Siao San" which is derived from the popular Japanese manga "Crayon Shin-chan" about a mischievous little boy.

The film was first released in Taiwan under the title Fart King 臭屁王. The movie was renamed and dubbed in Cantonese for all the Taiwanese actors to cater to the Hong Kong audiences. Hong Kong actors Ng Man-tat, Athena Chu and Gabriel Wong Yat-San (known by his nickname "Small Turtle") filmed their lines in Cantonese which was dubbed over by an actor for the Mandarin version. The movie was released in Taiwan on 25 March 1995 and then a week later on 1 April 1995 in Hong Kong.

== Plot ==
Siao San (Steven Hao Shao Wen) is a mischievous little boy from a well off family, but he feels neglected by his father because of his marriage to a younger woman. After being punished by his father for playing a trick on his new step-grandmother, San decides to run away from home. Tat (Ng Man-tat) is a middle-aged High School grounds keeper who has a crush on a blind floral girl (Athena Chu). He takes advantage of her blindness by pretending to be a rich man who often buys her flowers only to give it back to her as a gift. One day while at the park, Tat is hit with a bat by a woman chasing San for stealing candy from a baby. To retaliate, Tat uses the bat to throw at the women but hits a police officer instead. Both Tat and San fled from the officer and were forced to get familiar with each other to rid the officer. San decides to follow Tat after their run-in with the police officer and though Tat tries to get rid of him, San persists to following him home and even to the high school where he works.

At the high school where Tat works at, Mo (Takeshi Kaneshiro) is the popular school boy who has a crush on Ah Jane (Chen Yu) and often attempts to get her attention through immature means only to be ignored by her. However, Mo and Jane are in the same class, class 5D, which also happens to be the infamous class full of misfits that Mo is the leader of. The misfits often pull dangerous pranks to scare off teachers. A new teacher arrives, but he falls into the pranks, causing him to pass out, and having to be carried out of the school in an ambulance. San sits outside of Tat's door that night in the rain until Tat decided to take him in, which he finally decides to care for him temporarily. Tat takes San out to the city the next day to do various jobs, even resorting to conning others, to earn some money so that Tat can continue to buy flowers from the blind girl again. He learns that surgery costing HKD 500,000 is required in order for her to see, which she works effortlessly to sell her flowers.

Seeing how class 5D has gone through eight teachers already since the school year started, the school advertises in hiring another teacher while the deaf headmaster decides to personally teach the class temporarily. He gives them a pop quiz, threatening to expel anyone who fails the quiz. This prompted the class to cheat in which ever way they can to cheat while keeping him blinded and deaf. When this fails, the school decides to offer HKD $500,000 salary to anyone who is able to handle class 5D. Though San encourages Tat to take the job, Tat refuses due to class 5D's reputation with former teachers. San offers the solution of introducing him to someone who can teach him martial arts, but Tat is still skeptical. After school, Jen is being harassed by a biker; Mo jumps into the fight only to get beaten instead and then humiliated. After this event, Mo starts to lose respect from other students. Though Jane continues to ignore him, she acknowledges what he had done for her, after which he spontaneously tells her that he was Bruce Lee in his past life.

That same night, San brings a monk apprentice to personally meet Tat, but Tat shrugs him off, thinking he was a homeless man instead. The monk apprentice then flies away, in which Tat was amazed and finally decided to pursue martial arts. The Head monk then takes him as an apprentice after his persistent presence at the temple's entrance. Through vigorous and somewhat foolish training, the Head monk decides both San and Tat are ready for hypnotism but decides to graduate the two even though the training was insufficient and incomplete.

Tat takes on as the instructor of class 5D and counters all the pranks previously used on the last teacher. The next few days, Tat trains the student similar to boot camp using very severe methods to get the students to study to retake the quiz. Tat then goes to visit the blind girl and offers to pay for the surgery to fix her eyes. One night, Mo tries to convince Tat to hypnotize him to his past life but Tat refuses. Mo continues to be shamed by the biker, who is very persistent in asking Jane out on a date. When Jane continually refuses, he threatens to beat Mo until she changes her answer. When Tat stops the fight, Mo again persuades Tat to hypnotize him, which he then turns into Bruce Lee and finally defeats the biker. Although Jane and Mo ends being closer, Tat is fired from his teaching position by aiding in the fight and he loses the bonus to help the blind girl in her surgery.

Seeing Tat sulking, San and Tat goes to San's previous home at night to get the money. He goes to his father's safe in the bedroom but paused to cry over him. When his father wakes up, San had no choice but to toss the money to Tat and Tat leaves San behind. After giving the stolen money to the blind girl, Tat returns to confess his crimes to San's father and promises to pay them back. Even though he was offered to stay with San, he refuses and takes on various jobs working as an honest homeless man. He happens upon the blind girl's floral shop, but she does not recognize Tat because of his refusal to speak. When he finally speaks, the blind girl is shocked to see his state of living. When her husband approaches them, Tat leaves them. Tat is reunited with San when he ran away from home again.

== Cast ==
- Takeshi Kaneshiro as Mo
- Ng Man-tat as Tat
- Athena Chu as the blind girl
- Steven Hao Shao Wen as San
- Hui-Wen Pai
- Yuen Lai
- Wong Hin
- Wong Yuk-Yin
- Cheung Laap-Wai
- Gabriel Wong Yat-San
- Lau Shun
- Gu Bao-Ming
- Chen Yu (陈妤)
- Chan Wai-Lau
- Wu Min
- Kuo Tze-Cheng
- Chow Tung-Wan

== Filming ==
Taiwan promo poster showing the movie's original title.

The movie was filmed around the Daan district of Taipei, Taiwan. Noticeable places in the movie are the "Shangri La Far Eastern Plaza Hotel", "The Mall", and "Daan Forest Park". Ng Man-tat, Athena Chu and Gabriel Wong Yat-San who were constant collaborators on Stephen Chow movies at that time were brought on the movie to cater to Hong Kong audiences for the Hong Kong release of the film since comedy movies starring Chow and Ng were a big hit in Hong Kong during that period. The storyline of the film is supposedly to be based in Hong Kong but noticeable things that differentiate Hong Kong and Taiwan can be seen in the movie (such as the taxi cabs in the movie are yellow instead of red and the currency has Sun Yat-sen on it instead of Queen Elizabeth II because Hong Kong was still a British Colony when the movie was filmed).

== Production credits ==
- Production Manager: Tok Chung-Man, Chan Gei-Yuen
- Planning: Yiu Kei-Wai
- Lighting: Choi Sam-Kat
