= Flying Dagger =

1993 Hong Kong film by Kevin Chu

- DVD cover art
- Traditional Chinese: 神經刀與飛天貓
- Simplified Chinese: 神经刀与飞天猫
- Hanyu Pinyin: Shénjīng Dāo Yǔ Fēitiān Māo
- Jyutping: San4 Ging1 Dou1 Jyu2 Fei1 Tin1 Maau1
- Directed by: Kevin Chu
- Written by: Wong Jing
- Produced by: Hui Pooi-yung
- Starring: Tony Leung; Sharla Cheung; Jacky Cheung; Maggie Cheung; Jimmy Lin; Gloria Yip; Ng Man-tat; Chan Hung-lit
- Cinematography: Chan Wing-shu
- Edited by: Ma Chung-yiu
- Music by: Chan Daai-lik; Foo Laap
- Production companies: Chang Hong Channel Film & Video Ltd. Co. (HK)
- Distributed by: SYS Entertainment
- Release date: 6 May 1993
- Running time: 86 minutes
- Country: Hong Kong
- Language: Cantonese

Flying Dagger (Chinese: 神經刀與飛天貓; lit. 'Nervous Knife and Apsara Flying Cat') is a 1993 wuxia comedy film directed by Kevin Chu and written and produced by Wong Jing. The film features a large cast of stars and parodies numerous Hong Kong films.

== Plot ==
The Hon [Dagger] Brothers, Chung and Lam, who are in fact uncle and nephew, are rival bounty hunters to the Fung [Bewitchment] Sisters, and take glee in thwarting each other because Chung refused to marry Lady Fung. Fung Ling and Lam are also in love, but do not acknowledge it.

Emperor Tsao hires the Hons to capture the Nine-Tails Fox, whom he claims has made a major robbery of his household, including the rape and murder of his daughter and the murder of 41 servants. The Hons are distracted when they find the Fungs captured by Never Die and his brothers, who in spite of decapitation and loss of a hand, proceed to chase the Hons (the severed hand grabbing at one of them) to the lair of Nine-Tails Fox, who has recently caused his wife, the apsara known as Flying Cat to walk out on him. The group discovers that Never Die is allergic to glib talk, and begin speaking to each other glibly. Chung, too embarrassed to speak to Lady Fung in that way, instead speak to Nine-Tails Fox, the two pulling off each other's shirts, and trap Never Die, where he soon dissolves. The four bounty hunters and Never Die's hand escort Nine-Tails Fox away. Flying Cat returns to find drawn images of what has gone on previously, including what she interprets as her husband's homosexual behavior, and chastises the old man who sends the drawings out through a slot for not intervening, which he says is not his place.

Nine-Tails Fox, who proudly admits to being a thief but insists he never hurts anyone, escapes from the bounty hunters to the inn of Pang Tin-hong, where he becomes involved with numerous courtesans. The bounty hunters follow him, but not before Flying Cat catches up with him. Still other bounty hunters, including the burly Western Ace, a gay man who sings 1980s American pop tunes, and a transsexual who delivers poisoned kisses, arrive at the inn. Because the Hons and Fungs pay well and are supported by the police, Pang sides with them against the new bounty hunters, claiming that he and his wife are Leslie Cheung and Anita Mui. The transsexual kisses Chung, causing him to turn green and infect him with poison. After the other bounty hunters are defeated, Pang sends Lam and Ling outside, insisting that they are under eighteen, although both claim to be eighteen, in order to explain that the cure for the poison is to have sex nine times, then eat the strange fetus that will be born three days later. Chung tries to take Lady Fung to bed, but inadvertently passes the disease to Pang, whose wife and he fight a lot and never want it at the same time.

While Ling and Lam are outside, Never Die's hand grabs Ling's shoulder, and she thinks it is Lam's and rests her head on his shoulder. Thus distracted, Tsao captures the two of them, and the thieves and the bounty hunters team up against their common enemy and rescue the young ones.

At the end of the film, Lady Fung gives birth to the strange fetus, and the Hons, Fungs, Fox, Cat, and Pang seemingly forgetting about the idea that it is to be eaten and ready and excited to receive it as if a normal birth, are horrified to see that the baby is in fact Never Die.

== Cast ==
- Tony Leung Ka-fai as Hon Cheung (Big Dagger)
- Jacky Cheung as Nine Tail Fox
- Jimmy Lin as Hon Lam (Little Dagger)
- Sharla Cheung as Big Bewitchment
- Maggie Cheung as Flying Cat
- Ng Man-tat as Pang Ting-hong (Innkeeper)
- Gloria Yip as Fung Ling (Little Bewitchment)
- Chan Hung-lit as Dicky Lui
- Kingdom Yuen as Brothel keeper
- Yuen Cheung-yan as Never Die
- Lee Ka-ting as Erotomania man
- Lo Lieh as Must Die
- Pauline Chan as Evil Lady of Yi Ho
- David Wu as Western Ace
- Ku Pao-ming
- Fang Fang
- Sam Hoh
- Wong Chung-kui

== Music ==
The stock music score is created by Chan Daai-lik and Foo Laap. Among the sources of the music are "The Attack" from Quigley Down Under by Basil Poledouris as the theme for the Hon Brothers, the main theme from A Fish Called Wanda by John Du Prez as the theme for the Fung sisters, as well as music from Jay Chattaway's Maniac, Alan Silvestri's Death Becomes Her, and David Newman's Heathers, among others.
