= Treasure Venture =

Chinese comedy TV series

- Also known as: Sword Girl
- 侠女闯天关
- Created by: Zhu Yanping
- Starring: Zhao Wei; Nicky Wu; Gu Baoming; Lin Fangbing
- Countries of origin: Taiwan; China
- No. of episodes: 30

Production
- Running time: 1 hour per episode(including commercials)

Original release
- Release: April 3, 2000

Treasure Venture (侠女闯天关) is a comedy TV series which was produced in mainland China and Taiwan in 2000. It starred Zhao Wei and Nicky Wu.

== Cast ==
- Zhao Wei starred as Lu Jianping and Du Huixin
- Nicky Wu starred as Shui Ruoyan
- Lin Jianhuan starred as Prince Zhu Yulong
- Ku Pao-ming starred as Wu Ma
- Lin Fangbing - Ye Yinniang
- Liu Zi - Bai Ruixue
- Liu Xun - Cao Youxiang
- Cao Jun - Xiao Long
- Hao Shaowen - Xiao Fu
- Niu Ben - Bai
- Li Baoan - Lu Dingwen

== International broadcast ==
Country or Region	Network	Premiere	Title
China	Shanghai Television	2000	侠女闯天关
Hong Kong	Asia Television	2000	俠女闖天關
Taiwan	TTV	2000	俠女闖天關
South Korea	Gyeongin Broadscast Television iTV	2000	협녀틈천관
Indonesia	Indosiar	2001	Pendekar Chien Ping
