= Rainbow Sweetheart =

- Also known as: Chai Hong Tian Xin; My Girl
- Genre: Romance, Comedy, Drama
- Based on: My Girl by Hong sisters
- Directed by: Lin He Long
- Starring: Jimmy Lin; Cherrie Ying; Zou Ting Wei; Hou Shu
- Opening theme: Xing Xing hao" by Lai Ya Yan
- Country of origin: Taiwan
- Original language: Mandarin dialogues
- No. of episodes: 35

Production
- Producer: Chai Zhi Ping
- Running time: 30 minutes
- Production companies: Comic Rich Television Culture (Beijing) Co., Ltd. Shenzhen Meixun Jiarun Movie Industry Investment Co., Ltd. Youku

Original release
- Network: JSTV
- Release: October 19 – November 1, 2011

Related
- My Girl (2005 TV series); My Girl (Philippine TV series)

Rainbow Sweetheart is a Taiwanese TV series remake of the South Korean drama My Girl, directed by Lin He Long and produced by Chai Zhi Ping. Starring by Jimmy Lin, Cherrie Ying, Zou Ting Wei, and Hou Shu .

== Synopsis ==
ShaoFeng is an honorable young man whose family is in charge of the business of a large-scale hotel called BaiHe Hotel. In reality, ShaoFeng is the only one in his family who has the ability to lead the big company because his grandfather, the former chairman of the company, is too old to take such a heavy burden. ShaoFeng's grandfather is in poor health and all he wishes before his death is to see his lost granddaughter, Zhang HuaXiu. Therefore, he asks ShaoFeng to employ every means to look for Huaxiu. When ShaoFeng is told by his secretary that his cousin has died in a fire, he is very upset because he can't carry out his grandfather's last wish. In order to help his grandfather recover, he hires an intelligent young girl called PengXiaoQian, who comes from a poor family with a heavy debt to pay, to play the role of his cousin. Out of her need for money, she agrees to act as his cousin and moves into Shao Feng's house. Under Xiaoqian's considerate care, ShaoFeng's grandfather recovers his health quickly and begins to like his granddaughter before long. Living in the same house, the two young people gradually take to each other. However, they never express their feelings to each other because they are cousins in the eyes of the others. Unexpectedly, ShaoFeng's ex-girlfriend LuoYingYing, an excellent pianist who left ShaoFeng two years ago, comes back from Paris with the wish to patch up their broken relationship. Although Shao Feng is still dating her, he pays more attention to Xiaoqian, which makes Yinging unhappy.

XuKai(徐凯), ShaoFeng's best friend falls in love with Xiaoqian after several meeting several times. Though he has a clear idea that Xiaoqian doesn't love him but her so-called cousin instead, he still tries his best to help Xiaoqian to deal with all her problems. When Yingying accidentally finds out that Xiaoqian is not ShaoFeng's true cousin, she threatens Xiaoqian to leave ShaoFeng in order to keep her from telling everything to ShaoFeng's grandfather. Nevertheless, instead of giving up their love, Xiaoqian chooses to face all the difficulties with ShaoFeng. Eventually, they acquire not only forgiveness but also the wishes of ShaoFeng's grandfather.

== Cast ==
- Jimmy Lin as Shao Feng
- Cherrie Ying as Peng Xiao Qian
- Zou Ting Wei as Xu Kai
- Hou Shu as Luo Ying Ying
- Wang Gang as Peng Da Qian
- Liang Guo Rong as Chairman Shao
- Du Shi Wu as Song Yue Mei
- Wu Hao Ze as Tian Bao Yuan
- Wang Jian Ying as Tian Bao Ling
- Wang Yi Jun as Marry
- Li Quan You as Din Yi

== TV music ==
- Opening theme: "Xing Xing hao" by LaiYaYan
- Middle theme: "If It Were Not You" LaiYaYan
- End theme: "Color"(颜色) by Jimmy Lin
- Middle theme: "You Are The One" by Jimmy lin
