= Grandpa's Love =

- Film poster
- Traditional Chinese: 祖孙情
- Directed by: Kevin Chu
- Screenplay by: Wang Yi-Pai
- Based on: Misunderstood by Florence Montgomery
- Produced by: Kevin Chu
- Starring: Jimmy Lin; Hung Long; Fok Siu-Man
- Cinematography: Chen Jung-shu
- Edited by: Chen Po-wen
- Music by: Li Fu
- Production companies: Chang Hong Channel Film & Video
- Distributed by: Modern Films Distribution (Hong Kong); Upland Films Corporation Limited (Taiwan); Mei Ah Entertainment (DVD)
- Release date: 24 June 1995 (Taiwan)
- Running time: 90 minutes
- Countries: Taiwan; Hong Kong
- Languages: Mandarin; Cantonese

Grandpa's Love (Chinese: 祖孙情) is a 1995 Taiwanese film about the relationship between a grandfather and his grandson, with a plot similar to the 1966 Italian film Incompreso, which starred Anthony Quayle. The film starred Jimmy Lin (林志颖).

== Cast ==
- Jimmy Lin (林志颖) as Jiang Xing Jian (江行健)
- Hung Long (郎雄) as Grandpa (爷爷)
- Fok Siu-Man (郝劭文) as Jiang Xing Kang (江行康)

== Basic information ==
Director: Kevin Chu(朱延平) Video Title: Grandpa's Love Chinese name: 祖孙情 Dialogue language: South Fujian Dialect(闽南语) Production area: Taiwan(台湾)

== Synopsis ==
Jiang Xingjian and his four-year-old little brother' parents die in a plane crash. Their two boys have to live with their grandfather, who is the leader of a big company. The grandfather hopes that Ken (阿健) can take responsibility for the whole family, especially his little brother. He requires Ken not to tell the little brother Allcorn (阿康) about their parents' death. Ken wants to set a good example, but he is misunderstood by his grandfather because of Allcorn's faults. Under his uncle's advice, his grandfather decides to re-recognize him. While Ken is absorbed in the harmonious relationship established between him and his grandfather, Allcorn accidentally damages his precious video, taken on his birthday. He tries to repair it but fails. He is so depressed that get drunk. His grandfather decides to send him to boarding school after finding out. Ken is very upset and he climbs a tall tree. He falls, landing on a large rock, due to Allcorn's unexpected appearance. The grandfather finds the unfinished composition and has a better understanding of Ken. However, Ken is gone.

== See also ==
- Jimmy Lin
- Kevin Chu
