= Jimmy Lin =

Taiwanese singer & actor

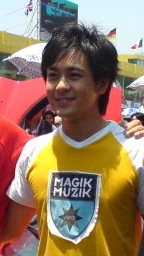
- Lin in Zhuhai, 2006
- Born: Taipei, Taiwan
- Occupations: Actor, singer, race car driver, entrepreneur, photographer
- Years active: 1992-present
- Spouse: Kelly Chen (m. 2009)

Chinese name
- Traditional Chinese: 林志穎
- Simplified Chinese: 林志颖
Transcriptions
Standard Mandarin
- Hanyu Pinyin: Lín Zhìyǐng
Yue: Cantonese
- Jyutping: Lam4 Zi3 Wing6
Southern Min
- Hokkien POJ: Lîm Chì-éng
- Musical career
- Also known as: Xiaozhi (小志); Little Whirlwind Zhiying (志颖), Xiaoying (小颖) Lin Xiaozhi (林小志)
- Genres: Mandopop

Jimmy Lin Chih-ying (Chinese: 林志穎; Pe̍h-ōe-jī: Lîm Chì-éng) is a Taiwanese singer, actor, and race car driver.

== Early life ==
Lin was the second child in a family of five children. Lin graduated from Zhong Xiao Primary School and Huai Sheng Secondary School. At the age of 16, while he was studying Drama and Photography in Hua Gang, Lin was discovered during a performance in school. During this time, he was the star of the campus. At first, Lin declined his first manager's offer to enter the entertainment industry but later took up the offer. In 1992, at the age of 17, he became a superstar overnight following the release of his debut album, Not Every Love Song Has Fond Memories (不是每個戀曲都有美好回憶). Lin's sweeping fame across Asia gained him the nickname "Little Whirlwind". He was also known as one of the "Little Four Heavenly Kings" (四小天王) in Taiwan. Lin became the youngest singer ever to hold a concert at the Hong Kong Coliseum (香港紅館), being only 18 years old at the time. Lin went on to record and release thirteen more albums, including special editions and compilations, and has since filmed many movies and series, as well as endorsed many products. Throughout his singing career, he also received many awards for his hit songs and albums.

Lin enjoyed great popularity until 1994, when he had to serve compulsory military service. Despite knowing it would affect his career tremendously, Lin did not seek special treatment from the government. In October 1994, he entered service. In a 2005 talk show, he revealed that in addition to the arduous training, Lin was bullied by seniors, and was expected to perform better than other soldiers due to his fame. Lin also mentioned that one of the causes for this treatment was his status as a celebrity. During his service he served primarily in the entertainment section of the military and was discharged after two years in the military where he returned to acting and singing.

== Career ==
Lin's career as an actor and singer was momentarily postponed by his compulsory military service and upon his return, he was overshadowed by many newcomers. Despite the difficulties Lin faced in re-entering showbiz, he worked hard and even set up his own company, Jimmy Creative, which produced his recent 5 albums under Forward music label. The most noteworthy album was 1999 album Scarecrow (稻草人), which contained a song of the same title.

In 1997, Lin decided to realize his dream of car racing. In one of the races that year, he encountered a crash which nearly cost him his life. Seconds after limping out of the wreck, the car exploded. The only reminder of the accident now is a few metal plates in the foot that was crushed. Despite the accident, Lin did not give up on racing, and constantly strove to better himself. With regard to this, he often says, "When I race, I am not racing against others, but against myself." Today, Lin is one of the top 10 rally racers in Mainland China. In 2005, he signed a contract with Hong He, the top team in China, as a racer. He trained under top racing coach Ma Jun Kun. Lin hopes to become a Formula 3 racer someday, and become a full-time professional racer. In 2005 he and two friends founded the Ping Tzuo Racing Advisory Company at the Zhuhai International Circuit. On 23 October 2005, Lin hosted the first "Jimmy Cup", a racing event where mainly male celebrities race. The event's aim was to increase the awareness of traffic safety to the masses and to promote the love of car racing. In 2006 he formed the Jimmy Lin Rally Team to compete in the China Rally Championship. His team won Overall 3rd place in the 2006 China Rally Championship. On 26 October 2008 he was formally inducted into the China F1 TianRong Powerboat Racing team in Shenzhen, China. He will train with the team in 2009/2010 in order to get his F1 powerboat racing license.

In 1999, Lin performed within the Suntec City Fountain of Wealth in Singapore, becoming the first singer to ever hold a concert there.

While being a racer, Lin has not neglected his showbiz career. Lin concentrated on filming after his last album "Going for a Walk" in 2000. The grandest production in recent years was Demi-Gods and Semi-Devils (天龙八部), where he took the role of the Dali crown-prince Duan Yu.

Despite having not released an album since 2006, which his last album was titled Can't stop me (擋不住我), Lin continues to sing theme songs for television series and films, and give regular live performances for various events including mini concerts, fund-raising events, festivals and even state events. He was one of the celebrity performers at the Third "Beijing 2008" Olympic Cultural Festival (2005), where the theme motto "One World, One Dream" was officially announced. In 2007, he starred in his first Taiwanese idol series, My Lucky Star, which got the number one rating for 13 weeks in a row. In 2010, he starred in his first Chinese modern series, Hunan TV's "Single Princess and Blind Dates".

On 17 October 2008, Lin held his first concert in Shanghai, China after 14 years. It was a stunning success in front of 25,000 screaming fans who sang Happy Birthday to celebrate his 34th birthday. On 21 November 2009, he held his 2nd concert in Shanghai in front of 10,000 fans. It was a family event where his parents and siblings attended, and he sang a duet with his younger brother Jason Lin.

In addition to his entertainment and racing career, Lin is also a very successful businessman. In 2000 he started the IT company Inwellcom Tech. with friends that specialize in writing software for surveillance and banking. He himself became the youngest director in the Taiwan Network Association. His own house in Taipei has the latest high tech surveillance equipment manufactured by his own company. He can remotely control more than 100 home appliances from his PDA. He talked about this in talk shows in 2006. He also set up a business on the internet with his brother, naming his own brand "JR" (Jimmy Racing). The online venture sells goods ranging from sunglasses to bikinis. It has since grown in scale from operating solely on auction sites to selling his goods on shopping sites. In 2004 he opened Roadstar, a car dealership in Taipei that sells high-end sports cars. In 2005 he founded the PingTzuo International Racing Sports Advisory Company in Zhuhai, China with his best friend Chen Wei Liang. Lin is also on the PingTzuo racing team. In 2006 he opened a restaurant, The Dream Family Cafe in the Jing Hua Cheng shopping mall in Taipei, Taiwan. In 2009 he became a part-time wedding photographer for the Shanghai Chuech studio. He also owns real estates in Taiwan, Shanghai, and Beijing.

Lin also contributed to the society by becoming an ambassador for many youth and government campaigns in Taiwan and other places. On 17 October 2003, Jimmy was presented with the "Outstanding Chinese Award" at the 51st San Francisco Chinese Festival. The award was mainly to commend him for starting a series of fund-raisers for schools, for being an anti-drug ambassador, and for participation in public community events.

On 16 April 2011, Jimmy Lin interviewed the F1 racing driver Michael Schumacher for the international magazine GQ (May 2011 issue). Jimmy did his homework before he met with Schumacher and did the entire interview in English. He asked more than 20 questions in different areas: life, racing experiences and charity. Jimmy said, "Schumacher is my most admired F1 racer. Besides his remarkable racing records, I also highly respect his charity works. He donated money to help the refugees rebuild their homes after the 2004 tsunami." Schumacher gave Jimmy a pair of limited edition shoes that he designed and invited him to a private dinner the following day.

== Personal life ==
Lin dated actress Ruby Lin, his co-star in the 1995 film School Days. At that time he was very popular, having already released several albums in Asia, while Ruby was an unknown, acting in her first project. Their relationship lasted for 2–3 years, and Ruby was the only girlfriend Lin had ever taken home to see his father. In a later talk show together, both parties stated that it was due to the distance and fading of feelings that led to their breakup.

In October 2009, Lin announced his engagement to model Kelly Chen Ruoyi (陳若儀). A wedding ceremony was held on 30 July 2013 in Phuket, Thailand. They have three sons.

On 22 July 2022, Lin and his son were injured in a car accident but were not in critical condition. Both were recovering well as they received treatment at a hospital.

== Discography ==
- Not Every Love Song Has Fond Memories (1992)
- Summer of '92 (1992)
- Why Am I Always Hurt (1992)
- Thinking of You (1993)
- Fiery Heart (1994)
- Goodbye My Friend (1994)
- Saying Goodbye to Yesterday (1994)
- Dream Is Ahead (1995)
- Expect (1996)
- Men Are Easily Deceived (1997)
- I Am Still Myself (1997)
- Before Dawn Breaks (1998)
- Scarecrow (1999)
- Go for a Walk (2000)
- Best of Jimmy Lin (2004)
- Jimmy F1ght (2006)
- My Lucky Star (2007)
- Black (2010 single with Wallace Chung)
- Celebrate Youth (2010 The 16th Asian Games youth camp theme song with Zhang Li)
- You Are the One (Sept 2010 Theme songs of Single Princesses)(Oct 2011 Theme songs of Rainbow Sweetheart)
- Color (Sept 2010 Theme songs of Single Princesses)(Oct 2011 Theme songs of Rainbow Sweetheart)
- Flying with You, Flying (Aug 2012 Theme songs of the movie Flying With You)

== Filmography ==
Year	Title	Role	More Information
2015	Emperor Holidays		
2014	City Hunter 城市獵人	He Xiao	TV
2013	Super Speaker		Anhui TV show
2013	Where Are We Going? Dad 爸爸去哪兒？		Hunan TV show
2012	Flying With You 一起飛	Xu Yifan	Film - China
2012	Legend of Chinese Titans 雲動故事		Animation - Taiwan
2012	If I Were You 變身男女		Film - China
2011	Speed Angels 極速天使		Film - China
2011	Rainbow Sweetheart	Shao Feng	Television series - Jiangsu TV
2010	Single Princesses and Blind Dates	Ji Fan	Hunan TV
2009	Shao Lin Si Chuan Qi 2	Li Shi Min	Henan TV
2008	Live With Chivalry	Jon	Musical by Chivas
2007	My Lucky Star (Fang Yang De Xing Xing)	"Vernon" Zhong Tian Qi	Television series by SETTV (Taiwan)
2004	Liao Zhai: Xiao Cui 聊齋	Wang Yuan Feng	Television series
2004	Shu Jian Qing Xia Liu San Bian	Liu San Bian	Television series
2004	Wolf 狼	Assassin	Film - Taiwan
2004	The Love Winner		Film - Hong Kong
2003	Demi-Gods and Semi-Devils 天龍八部	Duan Yu	Television series
2003	Boxing Hero 龍虎英雄	Dragon	Film - Hong Kong
2002	Secretly Loving You		Television series - guest appearance (in episodes 27, 28 and 29)
2002	The Monkey King: Quest for the Sutra 齊天大聖孫悟空	Na Ja	Television series
2002	The Legendary Siblings 2 (Jue Shi Shuang Jiao)	Jiang Fei Yu / Jiang Xiao Yu	Television series
2001	Feng Chen Wu Die	Journalist	Television series
2001	My Heart Will Go On	Bao Yi	Film - China
2000	Lotus Lantern 寶蓮燈	Liu Chen Xiang	Television series
2000	Master Swordsman Lu Xiaofeng	Lu Xiaofeng	Television series
1999	The Legendary Siblings 絕代雙驕	Jiang Xiao Yu	Television series
1999	Red Word	Ah Hu	Film - Thailand
1999	Ang Yee: Luuk chaai phan mangkawn		Film - Thailand
1998	Chirvalous Legend	Liao Tian Ding	Film - Taiwan
1998	Heavenly Legend	The Monkey King / Sun Wu Kong	Film - Hong Kong
1995	Forever Friends	Wizard	Film - Hong Kong
1995	School Days 學校霸王	Xu Zhi Hao / Xiao Zhi	Film - Hong Kong/Taiwan
1994	Grandpa's Love 侄孫情	Jiang Xing Jian	Film - Hong Kong
1994	No Sir 3 報告班長3	Lin Xiao Ying	Film - Hong Kong
1993	Shaolin Popey 笑林小子	Pi Shi Ting / "Spinach"	Film - Hong Kong
1993	Vampire Family 一屋肖牙鬼	David Jen	Film - Hong Kong
1993	Boys Are Easy 追男仔	Ching Siu Pei / Xiao Bei	Film - Hong Kong
1993	End of the Road 一屋子沒落英雄	Ah Ding	Film - Taiwan
1992	Flying Dagger 神經刀與飛天貓	Han Lin / Little Dagger	Film - Hong Kong
1992	Butterfly and Sword 新流星蝴蝶劍	Prince Cha	Film - Hong Kong/Taiwan
1992	To Miss With Love 逃學外傳	Lin Chi Yin	Film - Hong Kong

== Awards received ==
- 2011 6th Huading Awards - Best Actor in Idol Dramas 2011华鼎励志偶像最佳男演员奖

== Racing records ==
- Teams raced for: Renault Tire Racing Team, HongHe Rally Team, 香港代纳10方程式车队, Mitsubishi Lancer ManYu Rally Racing Team, Guangxi Speedone Rally Team
- Team owned: ESSO Jimmy Racing Team, Jimmy Lin Rally Team
- Team racing for now: PingTzuo Racing Team
- Team owns now: PingTzuo Racing Team

In 2011, he announced that he will quit rally racing due to the death of one of his racing buddies and that he wanted to devote more time to acting and singing.

=== 1997 ===
- September Super Car Challenge, Ferrari 348, 3rd place

=== 1998 ===
- February 555 Taiwan Rally Race
- March Super Car Challenge Cup, BMW M3, 2nd place
- August Impreza Challenge Cup
- November World Rally Championship Australia Hyundai Rally Car, got FIA International Class A

=== 1999 ===
- February went to Japan to study racing under a famous Japanese racer
- June Super Car Challenge, BMW M3, 3rd place
- August Super Car Challenge, BMW M3, 3rd place

=== 2000 ===
- 17 May Super Car Challenge, BMW using new M3 race car, 2nd place, broke Taiwan LungTam BMW M3 single lap record
- July Super Car Challenge, BMW M3, 2nd place, broke Taiwan LungTam BMW M3 single lap record
- 7 August formed ESSO Jimmy Racing Team and Racing Company, became spokesman for ESSO
- 28 August Zhuhai International Circuit Renault Spider Challenge, 4th round 1st place, 6th round, 2nd place
- 4 December Super Car Challenge, broke Taiwan's single lap record in Taiwan LungTam Super Car

=== 2001 ===
- 11 March Impreza race, group A, first round, 3rd place
- 1 April Super Car, 1st round, used M3 race car, 1st place
- 3 June Super Car, 2nd round, used M3 race car, 1st place
- August China Formula International Race, 1st place
- August Super Car, 3rd round, used M3 race car, 1st place
- September China Formula International Race, 1st place
- October Super Car, 4th round, used M3 race car, 1st place.
- October China Renault Formula, 5th round, Group A, 1st place.
- October China Renault Formula, 6th round, Group A, 1st place.
- 31 December Taiwan Oil year end Challenge, competing with the best 36 races in Taiwan, 4th overall. This established Jimmy's status in Taiwan's racing circle
- won 9 winner cups: seven 1st place, one 2nd place, one 3rd place. Became Champion of the Year for winning all 4 rounds of the Taiwan Super Car Race. He still holds this record.

=== 2002 ===
- 10 March China Renault Formula
- 2 March China Rally Championship, Shanghai representing Radial Tire Rally Racing Team
- 7 April Taiwan Super Car Race, used BMW M3, 2nd place
- 4–5 May Asian Formula
- 16 June China Renault Formula, 7th place
- 2 June Taiwan Super Car Race, used BMW M3, 1st place
- 2 July China Renault Formula, 3rd place
- 4 August Taiwan Super Car Race, used BMW M3
- 1 October Taiwan Super Car Race, used BMW M3, 2nd place

=== 2003 ===
- Contracted to race for Radial Tire Racing Team for 2 years.
- 20 March Shanghai Rally Race
- 12 April China Renault Formula Race, Zhuhai, 2nd place
- 8 June Malaysia PORSCHE GT3 CUP
- 17 July ChangChun Rally Race, 8th place
- 19 August China Rally Championship, Beijing
- 13 September China Rally Championship, Beijing
- 25 October Porsche Carrera Cup Asia, PORSCHE 911 GT3 CUP, Beijing
- 12 November Macau Grand Prix, Renault Formula Race, 17th place out of 25

=== 2004 ===
- March Shanghai Rally Race, 9th place
- 30 May Beijing Rally Race, dropped out at 10th place
- 6 June Shanghai Renault Formula Race, dropped out after collision at 7th place
- 27 June Asia Renault Formula Race, Shanghai, 6th place out of 30
- 26 September Asia Renault Formula Race, Shanghai, 10th place out of 30

=== 2005 ===
- Contracted to race for Honghe Rally Team, the largest racing team in China, for the reported sum of TW$10 mil
- March China Rally Championship, Shanghai 9th place
- April China Rally Championship, Zhejiang 9th place
- 8 May Asia Renault Formula F2000, Zhuhai 5th place out of 31
- August China Rally Championship, Guizhou
- September China Rally Championship, Yunan, 8th place
- September Coach for Jackie Chan Charity Race
- October Held the 1st Jimmy Lin Charity Stars Race at Zhuhai International Circuit
- November China Rally Championship, Shaoguan, Guangdong, eighth place.
- December ranked 8th overall in China Rally Championship 2005

=== 2006 ===
- 3/22/06 Formed Jimmy Racing Team and became his own boss. He signed British racer, Alister McRae, who ranked 3rd in 2003 and 26th in 2006 in the world. The other 2 racers in his team are Jimmy himself and the 7th ranked Chinese racer. Jimmy ranked 8th in China in 2005. McRae was paid US$50,000 per race, 5 races a year.
- 3/24/2006 Jimmy Lin Racing Team won both team 1st place and racer 1st place in Shanghai Rally Race.
- June Became Zhuhai Super Car Club Honorary President
- July China Rally Championship, Guizhou
- July Jimmy Lin Racing Team 3rd place at China Rally Championship, Guizhou
- August Celebrity Charity Race, team 1st place, men 1st place
- September China Rally Championship, Kaiyang, Guizhou, Jimmy Lin Racing Team, 1st place
- October Ford Celebrity Race, professional group 1st place
- November China Rally Championship, Longyou, Zhejiang
- 27 November Jimmy Racing Team won Overall 3rd place in 2006 China Rally Championship.

=== 2007 ===
- May Formed WSCC PingTzuo Racing Team with International Supercar Club at Zhuhai International Circuit. Jimmy will represent PingTzuo in the 2007 China Open Formula.
- May China Open Formula Renault Formula, Zhuhai 15th place
- 6/15/07 to 6/17/07 Raced for Mitsubishi Lancer Wan Yu Rally Team in the China Rally Championship in Beijing. His team won the race and Mitsubishi won the Sponsor's Cup. Jimmy placed 10th overall among 71 international and 5th among Chinese racers.
- July Jet Li Celebrity Charity Race, 2nd place
- 11/12/07 The Mitsubishi Lancer Rally Team won the grand championship of the 2007 China Rally Championship. Jimmy only participated in the Beijing Rally Race in June. He is not ranked this yr because he missed most of the races due to filming and showbiz conflicts but did contribute points to the team for completing the race in Beijing.
- November World Drifting Championship, Hangzhou, guest of honor

=== 2008 ===
- 1/27/08 Test drove the new British Radical Race car.
- 3/15/08 to 3/16/08 Drove a Radical SR3 at the Frestech Pan Delta Super Racing Festival - Spring Race at Zhuhai International Circuit.

Round 1: 1st place
Round 2: 2nd place

- 6/21/08 to 6/22/08 Tian Si Light Weight Sports Car Challenge Race - Summer Race at Zhuhai International Circuit. Drove a Radical SR3 and achieved double win.

Round 1: 1st place, Time 1:44.978
Round 2: 1st place, Time 17:41.700

- On 26 October 2008 he was formally inducted into the China F1 TianRong Powerboat Racing team in Shenzhen, China. He will train in 2009 in order to get his F1 racing license before he can race for the team.

=== 2009 ===
- On 1 March 2009 he signed with the Guangxi Speedone Rally Racing Team and will race in 3 rally races in 2009. His 1M yuan Mitsubishi EVO-10 race car was unveiled at the signing ceremony.
- 13–14 June 2009 China Rally Championship at Naning, Nanking. 12th place in Group N4 (International) out of 87 international racers, 7th place out of all Chinese racers. Earned 1 point for Speedone.
- 9–10 July 2009 China Rally Championship at Shanghai. 6th place out of all Chinese racers in group N4 (International). Won 6th place cup for Speedone, its first cup.
- 28–30 August 2009 China Rally Championship at Fugang, Guangzhou. Withdrew from the race after his EVO-9 race car had mechanical problems during the 1st day of the race.
- 2 November 2009 Race of Champions at The Bird's Nest in Beijing. 2nd place in the Celebrity Race.
- 15 November 2009 His PingTzuo Racing Team won the championship in the Asian category of the 2009 Asian AFR Championship.

=== 2010 ===
- 22 April 2010 PingTzuo racer Zhang Shanqi won 3rd place in the 2010 Asian Renault Formula Race at Zhuhai
- 23 May 2010 PingTzuo racers Zhang Shan Qi & Li Zhi Cong Respectively won Champion in Race 1 & 2 in the AFR Championship!
- 14 August 2010 AFR International Formula Renault at Shanghai F1 International Circuit. Got 1st place IFC trophy.
- 5–7 October 2010 PingTzuo won 1st place in the International Le Mans Cup (ILMC) 1000 km Zhuhai FLM division

=== 2011 ===
- 13 November 2011 PingTzuo won 1st place in the International Le Mans Cup (ILMC) 1000 km Zhuhai FLM division
