= Nicky Wu =

Taiwanese singer and actor (born 1970)

- 吳奇隆
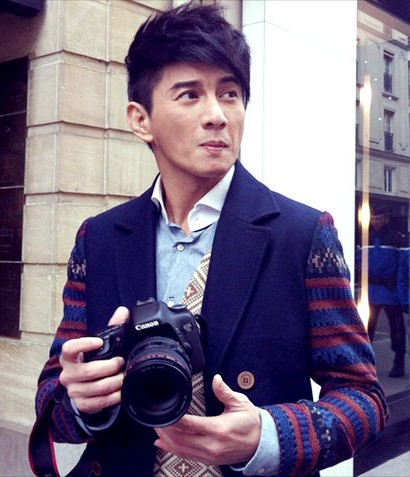
- Wu in 2012
- Born: Nicholas Wu Qilong; 31 October 1970 (age 56); Taipei, Taiwan
- Education: Taiwan Provincial Junior College of Physical Education; Fu Jen Catholic University; Peking University
- Occupations: Actor, singer
- Years active: 1988–present
- Spouses: Ma Yashu (m. 2006; div. 2009) Cecilia Liu (m. 2015)
- Children: 1 son (BuBu)
- Musical career
- Also known as: Thunderbolt Tiger (霹靂虎)
- Genre: Mandopop
- Instruments: Vocals, guitar
- Label: UFO (Taiwan)
- Formerly of: Xiao Hu Dui

Chinese name
- Traditional Chinese: 吳奇隆
- Simplified Chinese: 吴奇隆
Transcriptions
Standard Mandarin
- Hanyu Pinyin: Wú Qílóng
Yue: Cantonese
- Jyutping: Ng4 Kei4-lung4

Nicky Wu (born 31 October 1970) is a Taiwanese singer, actor and producer. He found fame in 1988 as a member of boyband Little Tigers. He later embarked on a solo career, known for his roles in TV series At the Threshold of an Era (1999), Treasure Raiders (2002) and Scarlet Heart (2011).

== Career ==
In 1988, Wu was discovered by an agency when he set up a roadside stall to support his family. Following an audition, he joined the boyband Little Tigers, where he was given the nickname "Thunderbolt Tiger" (霹靂虎), alongside Alec Su and Julian Chen. The group achieved success across Asia but was suspended in 1991 due to Chen's compulsory military service. Wu then pursued a solo career. Over the next five years, he released 13 Mandarin and Cantonese albums, and gained popularity for his role in Tsui Hark's film The Lovers (1994) with Charlie Yeung. After that, Chen was demobilized in late 1993 but the Little Tigers was effectively disbanded in 1995.

Wu enlisted for mandatory military service in February 1997 and returned to the entertainment industry in late 1998. He starred in the popular Hong Kong series At the Threshold of an Era (1999), before shifting his focus to mainland China, where he acted mainly in TV series, such as Treasure Venture (2000) and Treasure Raiders (2002). In February 2010, Wu and the other members of the Little Tigers reunited to perform at the CCTV Spring Festival Gala. Wu experienced a major resurgence in popularity for his starring role in the television series Scarlet Heart (2011).

== Personal life ==
Wu is the second child in his family, with a brother Wu Qizhan and brother Wu Qilin.

He married actress Ma Yashu in December 2006. They divorced in August 2009.

In 2015, after two years of dating, Wu married Cecillia Liu. They had official marriage registration in Beijing on January 20, 2015 and held their wedding in Bali, Indonesia on March 20, 2016. On April 27, 2019, Liu gave birth to their son, nicknamed BuBu.

== Filmography ==
=== Film ===
Year	English title	Chinese title	Role	Notes
1990	Wandering Heroes	好小子之游侠儿	Xiao Long	
1992	To Miss With Love	逃學外傳	Nicky Wu	
1994	In Between	新同居時代	Steven Chan	
1994	The Lovers	梁祝	Leung San-pak (Liang Shanbo)	
1995	Young Policemen in Love	新扎師兄追女仔 (逃学战警)	Suantou	
1995	Remember M Remember E	哪有一天不想你	Ziqi	
1995	Love in the Time of Twilight	花月佳期	Jiang Jiwei	
1996	Forever Friends	號角響起 (四个不平凡的少年)	Xiao Dingzhong	
1996	King of Comics	漫畫王（顽皮炸弹）	Young gangster master	
1996	Thunder Cops	新喋血雙雄	Wu Zhilong	
1996	Naughty Boys & Soldiers	狗蛋大兵	Captain Chen	
1997	The Kid vs The Cop	天生絕配	Wu Zhengying	
1997	Jail in Burning Island	火燒島之橫行霸道	Lin Jian'er	
1997	Stand Behind the Yellow Line	生日多戀事 （边缘青年）	Little Master	
1999	Deja-Vu	緣, 妙不可言 (缘分2000)	Nicky	
1999	My Heart Will Go On	还我情心	Leo	
1999	Grim Guys	好孩子（男生女生配）	Awu	
2000	A Matter of Time	新賭國仇城	Ye Shaolong	
2001	Never Say Goodbye	有人說愛我	Gao Zhaowen	
2001	First Story of Love	初戀的故事	Yu Bo	
2006	A Battle of Wits	墨攻	Zi Tuan	
2007	The Valiant Ones New	新忠烈圖	Cao Ding	
2008	Ticket	车票	Zhi Kan	

=== Television series ===
Year	English title	Chinese title	Role	Notes
1991	Little Hero, Dragon Whirlwind	小俠龍旋風	Yu Zimin	
1996	First-Rate Idol	偶像一级棒	Chen Dawei	Cameo
1999	IT Files	IT檔案	Computer genius	
1999	At the Threshold of an Era	創世紀	Joe Yip	
1999	At the Threshold of an Era II	創世紀	Joe Yip	
2000	Treasure Venture	俠女闖天關	Shui Ruohan/Lin Xiaolong	
2002	Treasure Raiders	蕭十一郎	Xiao Shiyilang	also co-director
2002	Pursuing Dreams	追夢	Shao Bing	
2003	Wesley	冒險王衛斯理	Wesley	
2003	Musketeers and Princess	名捕震關東	Wu Qing and Yinteng Gongchen	
2004	Heroes on a Silk Road	絲路豪俠	Yan Xiaoyao	
2004	Six-Fingered Demon Lute	六指琴魔	Fu Yunjun	
2005	Jing Wei Tian Hai	精衛填海	Xing Tian	Cameo
2005	How Much Sorrow Do You Have	問君能有幾多愁	Li Yu	
2006	Iron Fisted Drifter	鐵拳浪子	Kang Jie	also producer
2007	Cheerful Get-Together in Beijing	十全十美之相聚北京	Li Dongjun	
2007	Da Ma Tou	大碼頭	Wen Alu	
2007	The Fairies of Liaozhai	聊斋奇女子之连成	Qiao Sheng	
2007	Around Winter	大约在冬季	Gong Jun	
2008	You Are my Dream	你是我的梦	Tao Ziting and Ye Ting	
2008	Remember I Love You	记得我爱你/牽牛花開的日子	Xia Qing'en	
2009	Legend of the Book's Tower	風滿樓	Ao Xietian	
2010	Yue Erte Sonata	约尔特奏鸣曲	Murong Yu	
2010	Prequel of the Dart Hero	镖行天下前传	Wang Zhaoxing	
2011	Mystery Cases	江湖奇案	Chai Fei	Cameo
2011	The Sanctuary	圣堂风云	Liu Moyuan	
2011	The Hand Fan Lady	扇娘	Inoue Soratsuki	
2011	Scarlet Heart	步步惊心	Yinzhen	
2012	Lord of Legal Advisors	刑名师爷	Duan Ping	
2012	The Bride with White Hair	新白发魔女传	Zhuo Yihang	also producer
2012	To Advance Toward The Fire	向着炮火前进	Lei Zifeng	
2013	To Advance Toward The Victory	向着胜利前进	Zhan Lang	also chief planner
2014	Scarlet Heart 2	步步惊情	Yin Zheng	
2014	Incisive Great Teacher	犀利仁师	Liu Aotian	also producer
2015	Severe Winter	寒冬	Deng Zihua	
2015	Legend of Zu Mountain	蜀山战纪之剑侠传奇	Shangguan Jingwo/Lv Pao	also producer
2016	Impossible Mission	不可能完成的任务	Lan Zhibing	Cameo also producer
2017	To Advance Toward The Happiness	向着幸福前进	Yan Peiqing	also executive producer
2017	Fly the Youth	飞吧！骚年	Ji Haowei	
2017	April Star	繁星四月	Xiao Han	also producer and art director
2017	My Ruby My Blood	一粒红尘	Qi Tang	
2017	A Step into the Past	寻秦记	Zhan Feng	Cameo also art director
2018	The Legend of Zu 2	蜀山战纪2踏火行歌	Xiao Yue/ Baili Liuguang	also producer
2018	Mr. Nanny	月嫂先生	Shen Xinwei	
2020	Marry Me	三嫁惹君心	Shi Boyin	
TBA	Goodbye Las Vegas	别了，拉斯维加斯	Olive	
2021	My Bargain Queen	我的砍价女王	Qin Hebo	

=== Others ===
Year	Title	Chinese title	Role
2003	Qi Ji Ying Hua	奇迹影画	as producer
2010	Hai Di Tao Fa	海底淘法	as executive producer
2010	Wu Han Qing Chun	无憾青春	as executive producer
2011	A Perfect Husband	完美丈夫	as producer
2015	Death Trip	夺命旅行	as producer

== Discography ==
=== Studio albums ===
Year	English title	Chinese title	Language
1992	Wind Chaser	追风少年	Mandarin
1993	Chase after the Dreams	追梦	Mandarin
1993	Suddenly Looking Back	蓦然回首	Mandarin
1994	A Future Out of Love	爱出个未来	Cantonese
1994	Want to Find a Place	想找一个地方	Mandarin
1994	My Summer Dream	My Summer Dream	Cantonese
1994	Fly Together	双飞	Mandarin
1995	To Persist	坚持	Mandarin
1995	Lone Star 119	孤星119	Mandarin
1996	'Sound and Shadow	有声有影	Mandarin
1996	Look for Me	找我	Cantonese
1997	Hero	英雄	Mandarin
2016	Journey	旅程	Mandarin
2018	Different World	異世界	Mandarin

=== Extended plays ===
Year	English title	Chinese title	Language
2003	Nicky's Full Mandarin Video Record in 2003	吴奇隆2003国语影音全记录	Mandarin

=== Compilation albums ===
Year	English title	Chinese title	Language
1993	Waiting Day after Day	一天一天等下去	Cantonese, Mandarin
1994	Loving You Magic Colored CD	Loving You 幻彩 CD	Cantonese
1994	Intense Nicky: New Songs + Selected Best	奇而浓新歌+精选	Mandarin, Cantonese
1996	Thunderstorm	霹雳暴风	Mandarin, Cantonese
1999	Warner's I Love series — Nicky Wu	华纳我爱经典系列 吴奇隆	Mandarin, Cantonese

=== Soundtrack appearances ===
Year	English title	Chinese title	Production	Notes
1994	"The Butterfly Lovers"	梁祝	The Lovers	
1994	"You You Me Me"	你你我我	The Lovers	
1999	"My Heart Won't Die'	我心不死	My Heart Will Go On	Unreleased
1999	"You Don't Know You Love Me"	你不识爱我	At the Threshold of an Era	
1999	"Actually I Deeply Love You"	其实我深深爱着你	Deja-Vu	
2000	"Handkerchief"	手帕	Treasure Venture	Cantonese version
2000	"Not Willing To Be Separated"	不願分離	Treasure Venture	Unreleased; Mandarin version
2002	"Turning Point"	转弯	Treasure Raiders (萧十一郎)	
2002	"Secret Pain"	隐痛	Treasure Raiders (萧十一郎)	OST
2003	"Rather Be Free"	宁愿洒脱	Musketeers and Princess	
2004	"When The Dream Is Over"	做完梦	Iron Fisted Drifter（鐵拳浪子）	
2004	"Migratory Birds"	候鸟	Iron Fisted Drifter（鐵拳浪子）	
2007	"Actually I Love You"	其实我爱你	The Valiant Ones New	
2008	"Fated"	注定	You Are My Dream	
2008	"You Are The One For Me"		You Are My Dream	
2010	"Wolf Fangs Colored Ground"	狼牙色大地	The Sanctuary	
2012	"Fragrance"	留香	The Bride with White Hair	
2012	"Flowing Love"	流戀	The Bride with White Hair	with Yan Yidan
2012	"Impermanence"	無常	The Bride with White Hair	
2014	"Me Who Loves You, Is Like This Today"	爱你的我今天长这样	Incisive Great Teacher	
2014	"The Promises Which Can't Be Said"	不能说出口的诺言	Incisive Great Teacher	
2014	"Snowy Night"	雪夜	Severe Winter	
2014	"Freezing Night"	寒冬	Severe Winter	
2015	"Between Love and Hate"	爱恨之间	Legend of Zu Mountain	
2015	"Snow in the Desert"	沙漠飛雪	Legend of Zu Mountain	
2015	"Enemy"	宿敵	Legend of Zu Mountain	with Xu Zhian
2017	"Thousand Years of Moment"	千年一刻	My Ruby My Blood	
2017	"Bring You To See The World"	带你看世界	My Ruby My Blood	

=== Singles ===
Year	English title	Chinese title	Notes
1993	"A Lifetime Promise"	今生有约	
1994	"A Future out of Love"	爱出个未来	
1995	"Can't Decide Myself"	一生不可自决	
1995	"Sleeping Beauty"	睡美人	
1998	"Dance Together"	一起跳舞	
1994	"Good News on Chinese New Year"	新春报喜	
2000	"Breaking Through Changes"	冲破万变	

== Awards ==
Year	Award	Category	Nominated work	Ref.
2014	Chinese Opera Festival	The Most Influential Actor	Himself	
2017	18th Shanghai Television Festival	Most Popular Actor	Scarlet Heart	
