= Xiao Hu Dui =

Taiwanese boy band

- From left to right: Alec Su, Nicky Wu, Julian Chen

Background information
- Origin: Taiwan
- Genres: Mandopop
- Years active: 1988–1992; 1994–1995
- Label: UFO Records
- Past members: Nicky Wu; Julian Chen; Alec Su

Xiao Hu Dui (Chinese: 小虎隊), also known as the Little Tigers, was a Taiwanese boy group formed in 1988. The group, consisted of Alec Su, Nicky Wu and Julian Chen, became a runaway success across the Chinese-speaking world. After the disbandment in 1995, the three members went on to pursue solo careers primarily in mainland China.

== Musical career ==
=== 1988: Formation ===
In the late 1980s, due to the rise in popularity of campus folk songs amongst the Taiwanese society, members of the local music circles and scouts began looking for potential new faces, and Chinese pop music became active.

In July 1988, Taiwan's Chinese Television System broadcast the talent show “TV Rookie Hegemony Station” hosted by Chang Hsiao-yen, which consisted of three girls’ “Kit Team” (Chinese: 小貓隊) as program assistants. In order to achieve balance, agents from Carrier Entertainment Agency scouted three boys as assistants. In the end, 18-year-old Nicky Wu, 17-year-old Chen Zhipeng and 15-year-old Alec Su stood out amongst the candidates. The group consisting of these three was named "Little Tigers". At the time, Wu was a sports student studying in Taichung, where he had a judo and a Taekwondo foundation. The iconic movement was a clean and backward backflip, which gained his nickname of "Thunder Tiger" (Chinese: 霹雳虎). Chen studied ballet, has music and dance foundation, which is similar to Hong Kong star Leslie Cheung. He is known as "Little Shuai Tiger" (Chinese: 小帅虎). Alec was the youngest performer. He was a high school student at the prestigious Taipei Municipal Jianguo High School. At the end of 1988, they signed a contract with UFO Records.

=== 1989–1992: Release of first single and compilation ===
The original position of the band was based on Japanese boy bands in the late 80s, specifically Shonentai. With a fast-paced music and dynamic dance moves, they released their first single, titled "Green Apple Paradise" (Chinese: 青蘋果樂園), which is a cover of "What's Your Name?" by Shonentai. In January 10, 1989, they teamed up with Yu Huan Pai Tui for the release of their first compilation album titled "Happy New Year", which also include "Green Apple Paradise" as the second track. Originally a supporting role, Xiao Hu Dui developed a vibrant image, which gained popularity among teenagers.

=== 1994–1995, 2010: Chen Zhipeng's return from the army, comeback, concert, disbandment and Spring Festival Gala reunion ===
After Chen Zhipeng's discharge from Taiwan's mandatory conscription, Xiao Hu Dui released "The Stars are Still Brilliant" on December 9, 1993, which a release party is held in conjunction with the album. At this time, the entertainment industry in Taiwan has changed, which members of the group prefers developing in their solo careers. In 1994 and 1995, they released "The Feeling of Happiness is Always the Same" and "Much Ado about Nothing" respectively. In 1995, they held their first concert, titled "Screaming Dragons" (Chinese: 虎嘯龍騰狂飆1995年演唱會), which was held in Taiwan, Singapore and Mainland China. Due to disagreement between Warner Music and UFO Records, and the acquisition of UFO Records by Warner Music, the band is disbanded officially, and they continue to pursue their solo careers.

In February 13, 2010, the band made a brief reunion on China's Spring Festival Gala, performing three of their songs, including "Love" (Chinese: 愛), "Butterflies Fly" (Chinese: 蝴蝶飛呀) and "Green Apple Paradise". In March 2016, Su and Chen both attended Wu's wedding in Bali.

== Members ==
English name	Chinese name	Nickname	Date of birth
Nicky Wu	吳奇隆	Quick-Thunder Tiger (Thunderbolt Tiger)	31 October 1970 (age 55)
Julian Chen	陳志朋	Little Handsome Tiger	19 May 1971 (age 55)
Alec Su	蘇有朋	Well-Behaved Tiger (Obedient Tiger)	11 September 1973 (age 52)

== Works ==
=== Discography ===
	Chinese	Year
01.	新年快樂	10 January 1989
02.	逍遙遊	30 April 1989
03.	男孩不哭	21 September 1989
04.	紅蜻蜓	28 February 1990
05.	星星的約會	30 September 1990
06.	愛	31 August 1991
07.	再見	22 December 1991
08.	BEST – Dance Remix	31 January 1992
09.	星光依舊燦爛	9 December 1993
10.	快樂的感覺永遠一樣	10 December 1994
11.	庸人自擾	15 December 1995
12.	虎嘯龍騰 – 狂飆，1995年演唱會全紀錄	22 March 1996

=== Film ===
- "You xia er" (1990)

== Other ==
=== Advertising ===
- SYM Motors (1989)

== See also ==
- Forever Friends – a 1996 Taiwanese film featuring Nicky Wu and Alec Su
- My Fair Princess (season 1) – a 1998 Taiwanese period drama in which Alec Su and Julian Chen stars
- TFBoys, an idol group in China
