= Kevin Chu (filmmaker) =

Taiwanese film director

Chu Yen-ping
- Born: December 1950 (age 75); Taiwan
- Occupation: Film director

Kevin Chu or Chu Yen-ping (Chinese: 朱延平; pinyin: Zhū Yánpíng; Wade–Giles: Chu Yen-ping; born December 1950) is a Taiwanese film director.

== Career ==
Chu studied in Soochow University, and began to work in a studio of Central Motion Picture Corporation next to the school.

In 1980 Chu directed his first film, The Clown. The film is a successful comedy, which boosted the career of Taiwanese comedian Hsu Pu-liao, and began a series of successful and formulaic collaboration between Chu and Hsu. Hsu became known as "Taiwanese Chaplin", and Chu's The Funny Couple in 1984 with Hsu and child talent "Little Bing-bing" pays heavy homage to Chaplin's City Lights. Though the collaboration was a big success, Hsu and Little Bing-bing suffered from exploitation and Hsu died in 1985 due to stress and alcoholism. Chu met difficulties until he established his own company and came back in 1987 with Bighead Brigade (also known as Naughty Cadets on Patrol in Hong Kong), a farce-comedy series about military drill. Chu also began another series, The Kung-fu Kids, featuring child talents Yen Cheng-kuo, Tsuo Hsiao-hu and Chen Tsung-jung. Both series were successful until the formula got worn out. In 1985 Chu also made Seven Foxes starring Taiwanese pop singers Dave Wong, Tom Chang, and Samuel Tai, and actress Yip Chuen Chun. The film was shot when these young Taiwanese talents became famous in Hong Kong.

In 1990 Chu directed A Home Too Far based on Bo Yang's novel about the Chinese troop taking refuge in Santikhiri (near Golden Triangle). The two films were a commercial success and were nominated for Golden Horse Award. The controversial issues it featured stirred wide discussion. Chu considered this to be his best film. He also directed its sequel in 1993.

Throughout the 1990s Chu made a variety of films ranging from physical comedy, action, wuxia (swordsman), drama to erotic films. Slapsticks and body part jokes were staple. Collaboration with Cantonese speaking talents was common and their lines were dubbed with Mandarin. Most notably, Chu worked with the child talents Hao Shao-wen and Shaolin-trained Shi Xiaolong (Ashton Chen) in many comedy-kungfu-flicks. Chu's Shaolin Popey II: Messy Temple in 1994 starring the two was a local success in the face of strong competition from Hong Kong and Hollywood, and Chu was considered as an alternative to art films of "Taiwanese New Wave".

In the 2000s Chu again met difficulties in Taiwanese market, with two of his film breaking the record of lowest ticket sale (less than twenty tickets sold in Taipei City). Some of his films earned well in China. In 2009 Chu ambitiously made The Treasure Hunter, an action film shot on location in Gobi Desert, starring Jay Chou and Lin Chi-ling. The film was screened in China, Taiwan, and Hong Kong but met serious box office failure.

Chu once said in an interview that he is "not an artist," but rather "a movie factory that puts out products to match the season", and is compared to Hong Kong director Wong Jing.

== Selected filmography ==
(Some films have different English and Chinese titles in Hong Kong.)

- My Geeky Nerdy Buddies (2014)
- New Perfect Two (2012) (新天生一對, Xīn Tiānshēng Yīduè, also known as The Funny Couple)
- "Citizens Without Nationality" (short sequel to A Home Too Far II, collected in the anthology film 10+10, 2011)
- Just Call Me Nobody (2010) (Da Xiao Jiang Hu)
- The Treasure Hunter (2009) (Ci Ling)
- Kung Fu Dunk (2008) (Gong fu guan lan)
- How Young (2003)
- Expect a Miracle (2001)
- Treasure Venture (2000) (TV series)
- Lady in Heat (1999)
- Forever Friends (1996)
- The King of Comics (1996)
- The Feeling of Love (1996)
- Young Policemen in Love (1995)
- Super Mischieves (1995)
- Trouble Maker (1995)
- Shaolin Poppy (1995)
- Angel Hearts (1995)
- No Sir (1994)
- Grandpa's Love (1994)
- Hunting List (1994)
- Shaolin Popey (1994) (笑林小子)
- Shaolin Popey II: Messy Temple (1994) (笑林小子2新烏龍院)
- A Home Too Far II (1993)
- Slave of the Sword (1993)
- Flying Dagger (1993) (credited as Kevin Chu)
- Requital (1992)
- You xia er (1990) (also known as Wandering Heroes)
- A Home Too Far (1990)
- Island of Fire (1990) (credited as Lawrence Full)
- Seven Wolves (1989)
- To Miss with Love (1988)
- A Book of Heroes (1987)
- Bighead Brigade (Naughty Cadets on Patrol, 1987)
- Young Dragons: Kung Fu Kids (1987)
- The Funny Family (1986)
- Happy Union (1985)
- Seven Foxes (1985)
- Phoenix the Raider (1985) (credited as Ulysses Au-Yeung)
- The Funny Couple (1984)
- The Demon Fighter (1984)
- Seven Black Heroines (1983)
- Fantasy Mission Force (1982)
- Golden Queen's Commando (1982) (credited as Lawrence Full)
- Pink Force Commando (1982)
- Island Warriors (1981)
- Victims of the Killer (1980)
- The Clown (1980)
- The Ghost's Sword (1971)

== Reference and further reading ==
- Teng Sue-feng. tr. by Brent Heinrich (1996), "King of the Pop Flick--Film Director Chu Yen-ping", Taiwan Panorama, archived from the original on 2012-06-07
- Wang, George Chun-han. (2011), "Taiwan's King of Comedy: An Interview with Kevin Chu", Roger Garcia (Ed.) Asia Laughs! A Survey of Asian Comedy Films (pp. 173-179), Udine: Centro Espressioni Cinematografiche
