= Golden Horse Award for Best Adapted Screenplay =

Taiwanese film award

- Country: Taiwan
- Presented by: Taipei Golden Horse Film Festival Executive Committee
- First award: 1962
- Currently held by: Pan Ke-yin for Family Matters (2025)
- Website: goldenhorse.org.tw

The Golden Horse Award for Best Adapted Screenplay (Chinese: 金馬獎最佳改編劇本) is presented annually at Taiwan's Golden Horse Film Awards.

It was first awarded in 1962 as Best Screenplay. Starting from the 16th Golden Horse Awards in 1979, it was split into two separate categories, the other being Golden Horse Award for Best Original Screenplay.

== Winners and nominees ==
indicates the winner

=== 1970s ===
Year	Recipient(s)	English Title	Original Title	Source Material
1979 (16th)	Li Han-hsiang	The Voyage of Emperor Chien Lung	乾隆下揚州	The history of the Qianlong Emperor's Southern Inspection Tour
1979 (16th)	Li Yuan	Off to Success	成功嶺上	The novel by Li Yuan
1979 (16th)	Lin Chan-wai	—N/a	寶島警騎	

=== 1980s ===
Year	Recipient(s)	English Title	Original Title	Source Material
1980 (17th)	Liu Cheng-chien	A City of Vengeance	賭國仇城	
1980 (17th)	Hou Hsiao-hsien	Good Morning, Taipei	早安台北	
1980 (17th)	Chang Yung-hsiang, Chang Yi	The Pioneers	源	
1981 (18th)	Chang Yung-hsiang	If I Were for Real	假如我是真的	
1981 (18th)	Li Han-hsiang	The Tiger and the Widow	徐老虎與白寡婦	
1982 (19th)	No nominees			
1983 (20th)	Chu Tʽien-wen, Hou Hsiao-hsien, Ding Yah-ming, Hsu Shu-chen	Growing Up	小畢的故事	
1983 (20th)	Wu Nien-jen	The Sandwich Man	兒子的大玩偶	
1983 (20th)	Huang Chun-ming	A Flower in the Raining Night	看海的日子	
1984 (21st)	Hou Hsiao-hsien, Liao Hui-ying	Ah Fei	油麻菜籽	
1984 (21st)	Chu Tʽien-wen	A Summer at Grandpa's	冬冬的假期	
1984 (21st)	Chang Yi	Jade Love	玉卿嫂	
1985 (22nd)	Hsiao Sa, Chang Yi	Kuei-Mei, a Woman	我這樣過了一生	
1985 (22nd)	Wang Zhenhe	Rose Rose I Love You	玫瑰玫瑰我愛你	
1985 (22nd)	Hsu Shu-chen, Ding Yah-ming	His Matrimony	結婚	
1986 (23rd)	Wu Nien-jen	The Two of Us	父子關係	
1986 (23rd)	Huang Chun-ming	Sayonara Goodbye	莎喲娜啦！再見！	
1986 (23rd)	Yu Kwang-chung, Tsai Ming-liang	Papa's Spring	陽春老爸	
1987 (24th)	Yuen Kai-chi	A Chinese Ghost Story	倩女幽魂	The short story Nie Xiaoqian from the ancient Chinese literary work Strange Tales from a Chinese Studio by Pu Songling; The 1960 film The Enchanting Shadow by Li Han-hsiang
1987 (24th)	Chang Yi	The Sea Plan	大海計畫	
1987 (24th)	Li Yuan	Edelweiss	白色酢漿草	
1988 (25th)	No nominees			
1989 (26th)	No nominees			

=== 1990s ===
Year	Recipient(s)	English Title	Original Title	Source Material
1990 (27th)	Li Yuan	The Story of a Gangster	刀瘟	
1990 (27th)	Alfred Cheung, Keith Wong	Her Fatal Ways	表姐，你好嘢！	
1990 (27th)	Kwan Man-leung, Wong Ying, Jason Lam Kee-to, Lao Taimuk, Leung Yiu-ming, Tai Foo-ho	The Swordsman	笑傲江湖	
1991 (28th)	No nominees			
1992 (29th)	Stan Lai	The Peach Blossom Land	暗戀桃花源	
1992 (29th)	Tsui Hark, Chan Tin-suen, Tang Pik-yin	Swordsman II	笑傲江湖之東方不敗	
1992 (29th)	Yang Li-kao	Battle of Chocolate	巧克力戰爭	
1992 (29th)	Sandy Shaw	Justice, My Foot!	威龍闖天關	
1993 (30th)	David Hu, Tang Pik-yin, Jason Lam Kee-to, Ronny Yu	The Bride with White Hair	白髮魔女傳	
1993 (30th)	Ho Ping, Kuo Cheng	18	十八	
1993 (30th)	Lau Chia Hua, Xiao Mao, Yeh Hung-wei	Five Girls and a Rope	五個女子和一根繩子	
1993 (30th)	Tsai Der-ming, Chou De-yung	Green, Green Leaves of Home	青春無悔	
1994 (31st)	Edward Lam Yik-wah	Red Rose White Rose	紅玫瑰白玫瑰	The novella Red Rose, White Rose by Eileen Chang
1994 (31st)	Wong Kar-wai	Ashes of Time	東邪西毒	The novel The Legend of the Condor Heroes by Jin Yong
1994 (31st)	Tsui Hark, Sharon Hui	The Lovers	梁祝	
1995 (32nd)	Chu Tʽien-wen	Good Men, Good Women	好男好女	
1995 (32nd)	Ng See-yuen	Evening Liaison	人約黃昏	
1995 (32nd)	Sylvia Chang, Ang Lee	Siao Yu	少女小漁	The novel Siao Yu by Geling Yan
1995 (32nd)	Steve Wang	Daughter-in-Law	阿爸的情人	
1996 (33rd)	Jiang Wen	In the Heat of the Sun	陽光燦爛的日子	The novel Wild Beast by Wang Shuo
1996 (33rd)	Raymond To	Hu-Du-Men	虎度門	
1997 (34th)	Raymond To	The Mad Phoenix	南海十三郎	
1997 (34th)	Tsui Hark	A Chinese Ghost Story: The Tsui Hark Animation	小倩	The short story Nie Xiaoqian from the ancient Chinese literary work Strange Tales from a Chinese Studio by Pu Songling
1997 (34th)	Yuan Chyong Chyong, Ju Yeong Kuen, Tan Chin Hwa	Love Story	捉姦、強姦、通姦	
1998 (35th)	Joan Chen, Geling Yan	Xiu Xiu: The Sent Down Girl	天浴	The short story The Sent-down Girl by Geling Yan
1998 (35th)	Xie Yang, Yang Shin Yu	My Rice Noodle Shop	花橋榮記	
1998 (35th)	Chen Kuo-fu, Chen Shih-chieh	The Personals	徵婚啟事	
1999 (36th)	No nominees			

=== 2000s ===
Year	Recipient(s)	English Title	Original Title	Source Material
2000 (37th)	Hu Ann, Huang Dan, Tang Louyi, Kate Raisz, Bob McAndrew	Shadow Magic	西洋鏡	
2000 (37th)	Wang Hui-ling, Tsai Kuo Jung, James Schamus	Crouching Tiger, Hidden Dragon	臥虎藏龍	The novel Crouching Tiger, Hidden Dragon by Wang Dulu
2000 (37th)	Siu Kwun-hung, Samson Chiu	When I Fall In Love With Both	月亮的秘密	
2000 (37th)	Chen Yi-hsiung, Tso Shih Chiang, Liu Huai Chu	Lament of the Sand River	沙河悲歌	
2001 (38th)	Jimmy Ngai	Lan Yu	藍宇	The novel Beijing Comrades
2001 (38th)	Cheuk Wan-chi	Merry-Go-Round	初戀嗱喳麵	
2001 (38th)	Yeeshan Yang	From the Lueen to the Chief Executive	等候董建華發落	
2002 (39th)	No nominees			
2003 (40th)	Li Yang	Blind Shaft	盲井	The novel Shen Mu by Liu Qingbang
2003 (40th)	Dai Sijie, Nadine Perront	Little Chinese Seamstress	巴爾札克與小裁縫	
2003 (40th)	Wai Ka-fai, Yau Nai-hoi, Yip Tin-shing, Au Kin-yee	Turn Left, Turn Right	向左走‧向右走	
2004 (41st)	Lin Cheng-sheng	The Moon Also Rises	月光下，我記得	The story Xi-lien by Li Ang
2004 (41st)	Yan Yan Mak	Butterfly	蝴蝶	
2004 (41st)	Lee Chi Ngai	Magic Kitchen	魔幻廚房	
2005 (42nd)	Feng Xiaogang, Wang Gang, Lin Lisheng and Zhang Jialu	A World Without Thieves	天下无贼	The novel A World Without Thieves by Zhao Benfu
2005 (42nd)	Tsui Hark, Cheung Chi-sing, Chun Tin-nam	Seven Swords	七劍	
2005 (42nd)	Felix Chong	Initial D	頭文字D	The Japanese manga Initial D by Shuichi Shigeno
2006 (43rd)	Ning Dai, Zhang Yuan	Little Red Flowers	看上去很美：小紅花	The novel Could Be Beautiful by Wang Shuo
2006 (43rd)	Li Qiang	The Postmodern Life of My Aunt	姨媽的後現代生活	The novel Postmodern Life of My Aunt by Yan Yan
2006 (43rd)	Edmond Wong	Dragon Tiger Gate	龍虎門	
2007 (44th)	Hui-Ling Wang, James Schamus	Lust, Caution	色，戒	The novella Lust, Caution by Eileen Chang
2007 (44th)	Shuping, Jiang Wen, Guo Shi Xing	The Sun Also Rises	太阳照常升起	
2007 (44th)	Izo Hashimoto, Szeto Kam-Yuen	Shamo	軍雞	
2007 (44th)	Jacob Cheung	A Battle of Wits	墨攻	
2008 (45th)	Liu Heng	Assembly	集結號	The novel Lawsuit by Yang Jinyuan
2008 (45th)	Pang Ho-cheung	Trivial Matters	破事兒	
2009 (46th)	Guan Hu	Cow	斗牛	A legend
2009 (46th)	Gu Xiaoni	Death Dowry	米香	
2009 (46th)	Chen Kuo-fu, Chang Chia-lu	The Message	风声	The novel The Message by Mai Jia

=== 2010s ===
Year	Recipient(s)	English Title	Original Title	Source Material
2010 (47th)	Essay Liu	Seven Days in Heaven	父後七日	The story 7 Days in Heaven by Essay Liu
2010 (47th)	Cun Wenxue, Liu Jie	Deep in the Clouds	碧罗雪山	The novel Biluo Snow Mountain by Cun Wenxue
2010 (47th)	Heiward Mak	Ex	前度	The novel Ex by Heiward Mak
2011 (48th)	Junli Guo, Jiang Wen, Bukong Li, Ping Shu, Xiao Wei and Sujin Zhu	Let the Bullets Fly	让子弹飞	The story The story of mayor position stealing by Ma Shitu
2011 (48th)	Zhang Jiajia, Tang Que, Ma Luoshan, Wuershan	The Butcher, the Chef and the Swordsman	刀见笑	
2011 (48th)	Xu Haofeng	The Sword Identity	倭寇的踪跡	The novel The Sword Identity by Xu Haofeng
2011 (48th)	Chang Chia-lu, Cheng Hsiao-Tse	KORA	轉山	
2012 (49th)	Bao Jingjing	Love Is Not Blind	失恋33天	The online novel Love Is Not Blind by Bao Jingjing
2012 (49th)	Wang Quan'an	White Deer Plain	白鹿原	The novel White Deer Plain by Chen Zhongshi
2012 (49th)	Xu Haofeng	Judge Archer	箭士柳白猿	
2012 (49th)	Tom Lin Shu-yu	Starry Starry Night	星空	
2012 (49th)	Guan Hu	Design of Death	殺生	
2013 (50th)	Li Qiang	So Young	致我们终将逝去的青春	The novel To Our Youth that is Fading Away by Xin Yiwu
2013 (50th)	Stephen Chow, Derek Kwok, Lee Sheung-ching, Y. Y. Kong	Journey to the West: Conquering the Demons	西遊·降魔篇	
2013 (50th)	Liu Zhenyun	Back to 1942	一九四二	
2014 (51st)	Ma Yingli	Blind Massage	推拿	The novel Massage by Bi Feiyu
2014 (51st)	Chen Jianbin	A Fool	一个勺子	
2014 (51st)	Chan Fai-hung, Kong Ho-yan, Fruit Chan	The Midnight After	那夜凌晨，我坐上了旺角開往大埔的紅VAN	
2014 (51st)	Zou Jingzhi	Coming Home	归来	The novel The Criminal Lu Yanshi by Geling Yan
2014 (51st)	Li Xiao-feng, Wang Mu, Pan Yu	Nezha	少女哪吒	
2015 (52nd)	Pema Tseden	Tharlo	塔洛	The story Tharlo by Pema Tseden
2015 (52nd)	Sylvia Chang	Office	華麗上班族	The play Design for Living by Sylvia Chang
2015 (52nd)	Chu T’ien-wen, Ah Cheng and Hsieh Hai-Meng	The Assassin	刺客聶隱娘	The story Nie Yinniang by Pei Xing
2015 (52nd)	Xu Haofeng	The Master	師父	The novel The Master by Xu Haofeng
2015 (52nd)	Cheng Yu-Chieh and Lekal Sumi	Panay	太陽的孩子	The documentary The Desire Sea Rice by Lekal Sumi
2016 (53rd)	Mei Feng, Huang Shi	Mr. No Problem	不成问题的问题	The novella Mr. No Problem by Lao She
2016 (53rd)	Lam Wing Sum, Li Yuan, Xu Yi-meng, Wu Nan	Soul Mate	七月與安生	The short story Qiyue and Ansheng by Anni Baobei
2016 (53rd)	Fire Lee, Lily He, Frankie Tam Kwong Yuen	Robbery	老笠	
2016 (53rd)	Liu Zhenyun	I Am Not Madame Bovary	我不是潘金莲	
2016 (53rd)	Tashi Dawa, Zhang Yang	Soul on a String	རྒྱུད་སྐུད་སྟེང་གི་རྣམ་ཤེས	
2017 (54th)	Huang Hsin-yao	The Great Buddha+	大佛普拉斯	
2017 (54th)	Li Baoluo	Bangzi Melody	村戏	
2017 (54th)	Wong Kar-wai, Zhang Jiajia	See You Tomorrow	擺渡人	
2017 (54th)	Geling Yan	Youth	芳华	
2017 (54th)	Xu Haofeng	The Hidden Sword	刀背藏身	
2018 (55th)	Hu Bo	An Elephant Sitting Still	大象席地而坐	The story An Elephant Sitting Still from 2017 novel Huge Crack by Hu Bo
2018 (55th)	Sung Hsin-yin	On Happiness Road	幸福路上	
2018 (55th)	Pema Tseden	Jinpa	撞死了一只羊	
2018 (55th)	Li Wei, Zhang Yimou	Shadow	影	
2018 (55th)	Yuan Yuan, Ho Shing-ming, Pan Yu, An Wei, Rene Liu	Us and Them	后来的我们	
2019 (56th)	John Hsu, Fu Kai-ling, Chien Shih-keng	Detention	返校	The video game Detention by Red Candle Games
2019 (56th)	Richard Smith	The Garden of Evening Mists	夕霧花園	
2019 (56th)		Stand by Me	陪你很久很久	

=== 2020s ===
Year	Recipient(s)	English Title	Original Title	Source Material	Ref.
2020 (57th)	Kiwi Chow, Felix Tsang	Beyond the Dream	幻愛	The short film Upstairs (2006) by Kiwi Chow	
2021 (58th)	Jun Li	Drifting	濁水漂流		
2022 (59th)	Au Kin-yee, Shum Kwan-sin	Limbo	智齒	The novel The Wisdom Tooth by Lei Mi	
2022 (59th)	Ryan Tu	My Best Friend's Breakfast	我吃了那男孩一整年的早餐		
2023 (60th)	Wu Chin-jung, Cheng Wei-hao	Marry My Dead Body	關於我和鬼變成家人的那件事		
2023 (60th)	Wong Yee-lam	The Lyricist Wannabe	填詞撚		
2023 (60th)	Sasha Chuk	Fly Me to the Moon	但願人長久		
2023 (60th)	Chong Keat Aun	Snow in Midsummer	五月雪		
2024 (61st)	Wang Xiaoshuai	Above the Dust	沃土	The novel Grandpa's Ghost Trick by Li Shijiang	
2024 (61st)	Michihito Fujii, Hirokawa Hayashida	18×2 Beyond Youthful Days	青春18×2 通往有你的旅程		
2024 (61st)	Red Chang, Liu Lei-shuan, Chiang Hsi-wen, Shih Cheng-yu	GATAO: Like Father Like Son	角頭－大橋頭		
2025 (62nd)	Pan Ke-yin	Family Matters	我家的事	The short film Jie Jie (2021) by Pan Ke-yin	
2025 (62nd)	Polly Yeung	Another World	世外	The fantasy novel Sennenki: Thousand-Year Journey of an Oni by Naka Saijo	
2025 (62nd)	Lu Hsin-chih, Shen Ko-shang	Deep Quiet Room	深度安靜	The novel Deep Quiet Room by Sho-her Lin	
2025 (62nd)	Marilyn Fu	Rosemead		Los Angeles Times article "A Dying Mother’s Plan" by Frank Shyong	
2025 (62nd)	Lloyd Lee Choi	Lucky Lu		The short film Same Old (2022) by Lloyd Lee Choi	

== See also ==
- Academy Award for Best Adapted Screenplay
- Asian Film Award for Best Screenplay
- BAFTA Award for Best Adapted Screenplay
- Blue Dragon Film Award for Best Screenplay
- Hong Kong Film Award for Best Screenplay
- Japan Academy Film Prize for Screenplay of the Year
