= 2020 in Taiwan =

- Decades: 2000s; 2010s; 2020s
- See also: Other events of 2020; History of Taiwan • Timeline • Years

Events from the year 2020 in Taiwan, Republic of China. This year is numbered Minguo 109 according to the official Republic of China calendar.

== Incumbents ==
- President: Tsai Ing-wen
- Vice President: Chen Chien-jen, Lai Ching-te
- Premier:
  - Su Tseng-chang
- Vice Premier:
  - Chen Chi-mai, Shen Jong-chin

== Events ==
=== January ===
- 2 January – A Black Hawk helicopter of the Republic of China Air Force crashed. Eight people were killed, and five were injured.
- 11 January
  - 2020 Taiwanese legislative election
  - Tsai Ing-wen is reelected in the 2020 Taiwanese presidential election with a record 8.17 million votes.
- 15 January – The Anti-infiltration Act takes effect.
- 19 January – The Taiwan Action Party Alliance disbands.
- 21 January – The index case of the 2020 coronavirus outbreak in Taiwan announced.

=== February ===
- 25 February – Special Act for Prevention, Relief and Revitalization Measures for Severe Pneumonia with Novel Pathogens promulgated.

=== March ===
- 7 March – 2020 Kuomintang chairmanship election won by Johnny Chiang.

=== June ===
- 6 June – 2020 Kaohsiung mayoral recall vote removed mayor Han Kuo-yu from office.

=== July ===
- 25 July – The opening of Huannan Market in Wanhua District, Taipei.

=== August ===
- 30 August – Milos Vystrcil President of the Czech Senate arrived in Taiwan. It is the second high-profile visit by a foreign delegation to the island, after a visit by US Health Secretary Alex Azar who came (August 9, 2020) was the first US cabinet official to visit Taiwan since 1979.

=== September ===
- 12 September – Chen Chi-mai won 2020 Kaohsiung mayoral by-election.

== Deaths ==
- 2 January — Shen Yi-ming, 62, Taiwanese Air Force commander, Chief of the General Staff (since 2019), helicopter crash.
- 7 January – Chang Chiu-hua, 83, Taiwanese politician, mayor of Miaoli (1973–1982), Miaoli County Magistrate (1989–1993), liver cancer.
- 2 February – Jimmy Chang (張振民), 69, Taiwanese chef.
- 15 February – Sheu Yu-jer, 67, Taiwanese economist and politician, Minister of Finance (2016–2018).
- 13 March – Yang Mu, 79, Taiwanese poet.
- 17 March – Hsiao Feng Hsien, 79, Taiwanese opera performer.
- 22 March – Serena Liu, 44, Taiwanese dancer, complications from heart surgery.
- 29 March – Wang Wen-hsieh, 87, Taiwanese general and public official, traffic collision.
- 30 March – Hau Pei-tsun, 100, Taiwanese military officer and politician, Chief of the General Staff (1981–1989), Minister of National Defense (1989–1990), Premier (1990–1993), multiple organ failure.
- 21 April – Liu Ping-wei, 67, Taiwanese politician, MLY (1999–2002), oral cancer.
- 16 May – Chung Chao-cheng, 95, Taiwanese writer.
- 25 May – Wu Pong-fong, 55, Taiwanese actor and choreographer, stroke.
- 5 June – Ko Si-chi, 90, Taiwanese photographer.
- 6 June – Hsu Kun-yuan, Taiwanese politician, speaker of the Kaohsiung City Council (since 2018), suicide by defenestration.
- 24 June – Ding-Shinn Chen, 76, Taiwanese hepatologist, pancreatic cancer.
- 2 July - Chiu Chuang-huan, 94, Taiwanese politician, Minister of the Interior (1978–1981), Vice Premier (1981-1984), President of the Examination Yuan (1993-1996).
- 7 July – Sheng-Chang Chiang, 56, Taiwanese technology executive (Micro-Star International), fall.
- 30 July – Lee Teng-hui, 97, Taiwanese politician, President (1988–2000), Vice President (1984–1988), Chairman of the Kuomintang (1988–20000), septic shock and multiple organ failure.
- 3 August – Luo Pei-ying, 59, Taiwanese actress. (body discovered on this date)
- 16 September – Alien Huang, 36, Taiwanese singer, actor (Already Famous, Din Tao: Leader of the Parade) and television presenter (100% Entertainment), aortic dissection.
- 30 September – Mai Chia-je, 33, Taiwanese baseball player (Brother Elephants), traffic collision.
- 1 November – Chang Yi, 68, Taiwanese film director (Jade Love, Kuei-Mei, a Woman), co-founder of Liuli Gongfang.
- 7 November – Chung Laung Liu, 86, Chinese-born Taiwanese computer scientist.
