= 21st Golden Horse Awards =

Award ceremony for Chinese-language films of 1983 and 1984

- Date: November 21, 1984
- Site: Sun Yat-sen Memorial Hall, Taipei, Taiwan
- Hosted by: Wang Kuan-hsiung and Yiu Wai
- Organized by: Taipei Golden Horse Film Festival Executive Committee

Highlights
- Best Feature Film: Old Mao's Second Spring
- Best Director: Johnny Mak Tong-hung; Long Arm of the Law
- Best Actor: Danny Lee; Law with Two Phases
- Best Actress: Loretta Yang; Teenage Fugitive
- Most awards: Jade Love (3)
- Most nominations: Jade Love (7)

Television in Taiwan
- Channel: CTS

The 21st Golden Horse Awards (Mandarin:第21屆金馬獎) took place on November 21, 1984 at the Sun Yat-sen Memorial Hall in Taipei, Taiwan.

== Winners and nominees ==
Winners are listed first and highlighted in boldface.

**Best Feature Film**: **Old Mao's Second Spring**; Law with Two Phases; Jade Love; Teenage Fugitive; The Boys from Fengkuei; Long Arm of the Law	**Best Documentary Film**: **四季如春的台北**; This Crowded Land; 台灣的廟會; 枕戈待旦; 尋根
**Best Director**: **Johnny Mak Tong-hung — Long Arm of the Law**; Chang Yi — Jade Love; Hou Hsiao-hsien — The Boys from Fengkuei	**Best Leading Actor**: **Danny Lee — Law with Two Phases**; Jackie Chan — Project A; Sun Yueh — Old Mao's Second Spring
**Best Leading Actress**: **Loretta Yang — Teenage Fugitive**; Jang Chuen-fang — Old Mao's Second Spring; Yiu Wai — The Last Night of Madam Chin	**Best Supporting Actor**: **Chang Feng — The Warmth of an Old House**; Chen Jen-lei — Old Mao's Second Spring; Tai Bo — Law with Two Phases
**Best Supporting Actress**: **Chen Chiu-yen — Ah Fei**; Lam Hoi-ling — An Amorous Woman of Tang Dynasty; Chen Hsiu-ying — Teenage Fugitive	**Best Child Star**: **Lin Ting-feng — Jade Love**; Wang Chi-kuang — A Summer at Grandpa's; Wang Chun-po — Teenage Fugitive
