= 22nd Golden Horse Awards =

Award ceremony for Chinese-language films of 1984 and 1985

- Date: November 2, 1985
- Site: Kaohsiung Cultural Center, Kaohsiung, Taiwan
- Hosted by: Sun Yueh and Terry Hu
- Organized by: Taipei Golden Horse Film Festival Executive Committee

Highlights
- Best Feature Film: Kuei-Mei, a Woman
- Best Director: Chang Yi; Kuei-Mei, a Woman
- Best Actor: Chow Yun-fat; Hong Kong 1941
- Best Actress: Loretta Yang; Kuei-Mei, a Woman
- Most awards: Kuei-Mei, a Woman (4)
- Most nominations: His Matrimony (7)

The 22nd Golden Horse Awards (Mandarin:第22屆金馬獎) took place on November 2, 1985, at the Kaohsiung Cultural Center in Kaohsiung, Taiwan.

== Winners and nominees ==
Winners are listed first and highlighted in boldface.

**Best Feature Film**: **Kuei-Mei, a Woman**; The Loser, the Hero; Hong Kong 1941; The Time to Live and the Time to Die; Run Away; His Matrimony	**Best Documentary Film** -
**Best Director**: **Chang Yi — Kuei-Mei, a Woman**; Hou Hsiao-hsien — The Time to Live and the Time to Die; Chen Kun-hou — His Matrimony	**Best Leading Actor**: **Chow Yun-fat — Hong Kong 1941**; Hou Hsiao-hsien — Taipei Story; Alex Man — Hong Kong 1941
**Best Leading Actress**: **Loretta Yang — Kuei-Mei, a Woman**; Chang Ying-chen — Run Away; Cora Miao — Women	**Best Supporting Actor**: **Chen Bor-jeng — Super Citizen**; Cheung Ying — Love Me Love My Dad; Ku Feng — Love Me Love My Dad
**Best Supporting Actress**: **Tang Ru-yun — The Time to Live and the Time to Die**; Chan Yuen-lai — Hong Kong Graffiti; Deanie Ip — My Name Ain't Suzie
**Special Award**: **Hu Die**
