= Jade Love =

Jade Love may refer to:

- Jade Love (novella), a 1960 novella by Pai Hsien-yung, published in Taiwan but set in mainland China
- Jade Love (film), a 1984 Taiwanese film based on Pai's novella
- Jade Love (1997 TV series), a 1997 Taiwanese TV series based on Pai's novella
- Jade Love (2006 TV series), a 2006 Chinese TV series based on Pai's novella
