= Beyond the Dream =

2019 Hong Kong film by Kiwi Chow

- Film poster
- Traditional Chinese: 幻愛
- Directed by: Kiwi Chow
- Written by: Felix Tsang; Kiwi Chow
- Based on: Upstairs (short film) by Kiwi Chow
- Produced by: Andrew Choi; Felix Tsang
- Starring: Cecilia Choi; Terrance Lau
- Cinematography: Yat Lui Danny Szeto
- Edited by: Man Shan Emily Leung
- Music by: InterMusic Production; Julian Chan; Lam Kwan-Fai
- Production companies: Golden Scene; Iner; Photon Films
- Distributed by: Golden Scene
- Release dates: 14 November 2019 (Hong Kong Asian Film Festival); 2 July 2020 (Hong Kong)
- Running time: 120 minutes
- Country: Hong Kong
- Language: Cantonese
- Box office: HK$15.25 million

Beyond the Dream (Chinese: 幻愛) is a 2019 Hong Kong romantic drama film directed by Kiwi Chow and written by Felix Tsang, starring Cecilia Choi and Terrance Lau. The film is based on the award-winning short film Upstairs (2006), which was also directed by Chow. Beyond the Dream enjoyed box office success in Hong Kong, and the film also became the highest-grossing domestic film in Hong Kong in 2020 since the COVID-19 pandemic. The film also won the Best Adapted Screenplay award at 57th Golden Horse Awards, which is Taiwan's equivalent to the Academy Awards.

== Plot ==
Lee Chi Lok (Lok) is a primary school PE teacher who suffers from recurrent schizophrenic episodes. He regularly attends group therapy meetings hosted by the Give Grace Charity. One night, he stumbles upon Ling, another group therapy member, on the street. Ling laments about voices whispered in her ears and begins to strip in public. When a crowd begins to gather around Ling, Lok rushes to comfort her and attempts to stop the pedestrians from taking pictures of her. A young woman also comes to Ling's aid and covers her body with a scarf. After accompanying Ling to the hospital, Lok returns to his apartment. He takes great care of the scarf and becomes infatuated with its owner.

One night, Lok catches a glimpse of the aforementioned young woman on the way back home. She introduces herself as Yan Yan (Yan) who lives right above Lok. Yan's father, an alcoholic, regularly scolds and beats her. Desperate to escape from her father, Yan starts to take refuge at Lok's home. As they grow closer, Lok and Yan share their first kiss at a pedestrian tunnel on their way back to their homes. Torn between losing Yan and lying to her about his past, Lok ultimately decides to write Yan a letter to explain his schizophrenic history. Lok wants to give the letter to Yan but he leaves abruptly at the sight of Yan's father.

Signs of relapse begin to emerge as Lok hallucinates children calling to him at school. One night, Lok is suddenly awoken by sounds of beatings coming from Yan's apartment. Fearful for Yan's safety, Lok sprints to Yan's apartment and starts banging at the security gate of her home. Lok pleads with Yan's father to spare a crying Yan, who appears without any bruises and cuts. When Lok tries to desperately prove his love for Yan, Yan's father enters a scuffle with Lok and beats him repeatedly. Lok struggles to stand up and is shocked to see another Lok suffering the same bruises at the other end of the corridor.

An unknown time has passed and Lok sits alone at a light rail station. Yan arrives and lovingly reveals that she knows ‘everything’ about him. An alarmed Lok takes out his mobile phone, and records the conversation between him and Yan. To his shock, Yan is revealed to be Lok's hallucination as her voice cannot be heard in the recording. Lok spends the next six months in therapy and loses his job at the primary school.

One day at the Give Grace centre, Lok surprisingly finds ‘Yan’ sitting with the therapy group. Fearful of his return of schizophrenia, Lok rises cautiously to greet ‘Yan’, before holding her hand tightly to make sure she is not his imagination. Joe, a social worker at the Give Grace Charity, leads a nervous Lok away from the group. On her way out, ‘Yan’ recognizes Lok as the man who has leapt to Ling's aid before. This ‘Yan’ is revealed to be Yip Nam (Nam), a master's student studying to be a clinical psychologist (C.P.). Nam wishes to use a patient suffering from erotomania (hallucinations involving love) as the subject of her research. Dr Fung, her dissertation supervisor and head of the Department of Psychology, dismisses Nam's choice as premature unless Nam has a relevant patient at hand. Worried about her thesis falling apart, Nam initiates a sexual relationship with the married Dr. Simon, the vice director of the same department, who can help her recruit potential research subjects.

Nam starts volunteering at Give Grace Charity, offering free psychological counseling to scout for erotomania patients. One day, after finishing up with her scheduled meetings, Lok approaches Nam and wishes to join the program. To Nam's surprise, Lok is the perfect subject of her research. Nam shares her initial notes with Dr. Fung who gives Nam approval to proceed with her research. As part of the therapy, Nam asks Lok to write about his love story with Yan. Still nervous and under the influence of medications, Lok can only present a short piece of writing. To ease Lok's mind in their second session, Nam shares her troubling childhood with him as a victim of domestic abuse and neglect at the hands of her mother. Nam had been oblivious to her anger towards her mother until Nam took up therapy herself and forgave her mother. After a short recess, Nam returns with her hair tied as a ponytail. It triggers Lok's memory of Yan as he starts revealing details about Yan to a delighted Nam. Nam asks if Lok fantasizes about Yan sexually but Lok is reluctant to share, not wanting to desecrate his pure and innocent image of Yan. Embarrassed, Lok skips his third session with Nam. Nam concedes to losing Lok for good and prepares to defer her graduation. Feeling responsible, Lok resumes his therapy with Nam.

During the next session, as she looks identical to Yan, Nam asks Lok to remember what makes him notice her before hallucinating Yan. Lok calls Nam an angel, protecting Ling and himself as well as giving him the courage to love. Nam is visibly touched by Lok's remarks about her, before grounding herself back to treating Lok for the rest of the session. Lok provides a more detailed piece of writing about his imagined adventure with Yan. Nam, touched by Lok's passion and tenderness towards Yan, fantasizes herself as Yan in the story when she fervently reads Lok's writings. As Nam heads home afterwards, Lok silently follows her as they live in the same area. The awkwardness is broken when Nam notices him and invites Lok to walk with her. On the train back, Nam reveals that it is her birthday and invites Lok to her apartment. At her doorstep, Nam kisses Lok to both their shock and Lok makes a hasty exit. Nam apologizes to Lok and reminds herself to maintain a strictly professional relationship with Lok. However, despite Dr. Fung's warning not to fall for a patient, Nam begins a relationship with Lok in secret and ends her affair with Dr. Simon.

One night, while walking back to her place, Lok and Nam encounter Uncle Wong, an ex-boyfriend of her mother's, who wishes to ‘reconnect’ with a visibly shaken Nam. At her home, Nam tearfully reveals that as much as she hates her mother's promiscuity, she had been sleeping with men (including Uncle Wong) for favors or gifts. Ashamed of herself and deeming herself unworthy of Lok's affection, Nam kicks Lok out and weeps for the rest of the night. At dawn, Nam finds Lok at her doorstep, having stayed the entire night. Lok professes his love saying, ‘I have thought about it all night, and I do not mind any of that.’ Moved by Lok's words, Lok and Nam consummate their relationship. However, their newfound happiness is short-lived. Ahead of the last therapy session, Dr Fung learns of the romance between Nam and Lok. A desperate Lok tries to shoulder all the blame on himself to no avail. Lok speculates that Joe, with an unrequited crush on Nam, has filmed Nam kissing Lok as payback. Dr Fung manages to calm Lok down before leading a teary-eyed Nam back to the university. After reprimanding Nam for the taboo against a relationship between a client and a C.P., Dr Fung convinces a reluctant Nam to break things off with Lok so that the situation does not become worse for the sakes of both Lok and Nam.

Nam visits Lok's apartment and finds him having relapsed in worsened conditions. Nam admits to regarding Lok initially as a means to her ends; but she has genuinely come to care for him. When Nam cannot promise not to leave Lok again, Yan appears to Lok and preys on his insecurity about being with Nam. In a fit of anger, Lok calls Nam filthy for her promiscuity. Yan argues that unlike Nam who can choose any men she wants, Yan is Lok's only chance of a ‘real’ romance because she will never abandon him. Despite Yan's seductive words, Lok reaffirms his commitment to Nam. Nam, determined to snap Lok out of his hallucinations, tells him to look at her as she is a real person. Lok imagines being wrestled back and forth by Nam and Yan before he finally snaps. Lok pushes Nam to the ground and repeatedly bangs his head at a wall while he laments his failure for being a normal man for Nam. Nam manages to calm Lok down eventually by holding him tenderly for the rest of the night. As dawn breaks, a dejected Lok looks at Nam and comes to a tragic conclusion – no matter who she is, she will leave him eventually. Lok retreats to his room alone while Nam arranges for Lok to receive urgent psychiatric treatment, ending their relationship.

Lok and Nam do not contact each other for the next 3 months. Lok has been discharged from the hospital and Nam is due to appear in front of a disciplinary committee. Nam is stripped of her student status with immediate effect as punishment for her unprofessionalism. Thanks to Dr. Fung's influence, the committee may let her reenrol in the future if Nam agrees to: abide by the professional guideline of a C.P., never set foot again on the property of Give Grace Charity or approach their patients without the charity's consent, and finally never contact Lok again. No longer able to deny how much Lok means to her, Nam apologetically declines to meet the last condition and leaves her dream of becoming a C.P. behind.

Nam rushes to Lok's workplace. Lok tells her to leave out of worries about his possible relapses and repercussions from Give Grace towards Nam. Nam reiterates her love for Lok, echoing Lok's words ‘I have thought about it too and I do not mind any of that’. Despite his love for Nam, Lok does not want to be a burden for her and chooses not to act on his feelings. Lok thanks Nam for her help during his time of difficulty; however, he says it is time for them to ‘wake up from the dream’. Lok then disappears into the staff's room, leaving a heartbroken Nam in tears.

As night comes, Lok and Nam, alone in their apartments, fall asleep uneasily. The scene cuts to Lok and Nam/Yan standing at the opposite ends of the pedestrian tunnel, where Lok imagined his first kiss with Yan and held Nam's hand for the first time, on a rainy night. The lovers, wearing the same clothes as they did at the beginning of the movie, approach each other with hesitation. However, upon seeing Nam/Yan's radiant smile, Lok and Nam/Yan rush to each other and kiss passionately as the movie ends, leaving this scene and their future to the interpretations of the audiences.

== Cast ==
- Cecilia Choi as Yan / Yip Nam
- Terrance Lau as Lee Chi Lok
- Nina Paw as Dr. Fung, the mentor of Yip Lam.
- Chan-Leung Poon as Dr. Simon

== Production ==
=== Script ===
The script of this film can be traced back to 2006. Director Kiwi Chow returned to school as a part-time lecturer two years after he was graduated from Hong Kong Academy for Performing Arts. At that time, a student talked about the story of filming the story of psychiatric patients, which inspired him to start information gathering, and found that it was very difficult for them to fall in love, so it made him to create a 30-minute short film, named "Upstairs". The short film was well received and won several local and international film festival awards, including the Special Award for Young Film Art at the 2nd Student Television Festival which held in Warsaw, Poland, the Grand Prize of the 2006 Kodak Cinematography Competition (Hong Kong Region), the Silver Award of 2006 Hong Kong Independent Short Film and Video Competition (Open Category). The impressive achievements encouraged him to extend the story into a feature film, Beyond the Dream. However, it unfortunately was not favored by investors, and the result was nothing. A few years before the film started, the director co-founded "Lightseed Films" with Felix Tsang, another producer and screenwriter. They cooperated to complete several scripts. Chow suddenly hooked the movie that have been shelved for years since they're failed to find funds to start filming. They made further revisions to Beyond the Dream and later obtained government funding successfully.

=== Funding ===
Beyond the Dream was received HK $1.2 million through the Film Development Fund, which accounting for 20% of the total cost. The director had directed a film with sensitive theme, Ten Years, and some investors have indicated that they would not invest in his film, which made him to face difficulties in raising funds. The film was released on the big screen because of some benefactor had donated generously as they don't want to witness the decline of Hong Kong-produced films.

=== Casting ===
The director Chow found that Terrance Lau performed in a different way within the audition, he's presents a Psychosis patient who seemed to be no different from the normal person, which coincides with his message. As for the heroine, because of someone had introduced her to the director, and the director had seen her performance at "My Very Short Marriage" and thought that she was very refreshing. She plays a professional role in the TV series, which is quite similar to the setting of this movie. In addition, combined with her looks like a highly educated person and her natural performance in audition, those various factors made her the best choice for the heroine.

=== Filming ===
Most of the scenes in this film were filmed at Tuen Mun, Hong Kong. however it was not arranged by the director deliberately. When he discussed with the screenwriter about the character and background of the male protagonist, Chow believed that he was a character with low self-esteem, introverted, and avoids crowds, which was not suitable for living in the city center, but in a more remote location, so it made Tuen Mun as one of the options.

=== Music ===
The music was done by Julian Chan and Lam Kwan-fai of Intermusic Production, and the sound design was done by Taiwanese sound designer Tu Du-Chih.

== Release ==
Beyond the Dream was released in Hong Kong on 2 July 2020, by Golden Scene Films. On the opening day, the box office was bleak for $140,000 Hong Kong dollars only. Fortunately, the box office rose sharply with the urgent support of the actors Chapman To, Kristal Tin, Harriet Yeung, director Wong Ho Yin and the yellow economic circle, and with many film critics were praised the film also, the box office as high as HK$750,000 on 4 July, and HK$900,000 on 5 July, becoming the single-day box office championship for two consecutive days. The box office has accumulated to about 2.4 million Hong Kong dollars within the 4 days of opening. By 9 July, the accumulated box office exceeded 4 million Hong Kong dollars, became the box office champion of the week. The 5 main creators of the movie went to multiple theaters in person for thank the tickets, more than 100 people had lined up for a photo with the main creator in each theater. As of 13 July, the box office has exceeded 8 million Hong Kong dollars. Beyond the Dream had reached HK$15.25 million at the Hong Kong box office finally, became one of the top ten movies with the highest Hong Kong box office in 2020.

The DVD/Blu-ray disc of the movie was released in Hong Kong on 3 December 2020, and according to the Hong Kong Record Merchants Association, Beyond the Dream had once topped the weekly DVD sales chart.

Director Chow pointed out that Beyond the Dream was to be able to make profits by relying on the local market of Hong Kong alone, which is a very rare case for Hong Kong movies in recent years.

The movie in Taiwan box office received NT$943,000.

== Accolades ==
Year	Ceremony	Category	Recipient(s)	Result
2020	The 26th Hong Kong Film Critics Society Award	Best Picture	Beyond the Dream	Nominated
2020	The 26th Hong Kong Film Critics Society Award	Featured Movies	Beyond the Dream	Won
2020	The 26th Hong Kong Film Critics Society Award	Best Director	Kiwi Chow	Nominated
2020	The 26th Hong Kong Film Critics Society Award	Best Screenplay	Felix Tsang and Kiwi Chow	Nominated
2020	The 26th Hong Kong Film Critics Society Award	Best Actress	Cecilia Choi	Won
2020	The 26th Hong Kong Film Critics Society Award	Best Actor	Terrance Lau	Won
2020	The 12th Hong Kong Film Directors Guild Annual Awards	Best Newcomer	Terrance Lau	Won
2020	The 3rd Kongest Film Awards	The Kongest Actor	Terrance Lau	Won
2020	The 3rd Kongest Film Awards	The Kongest Picture	Beyond the Dream	Nominated
2020	The 3rd Kongest Film Awards	My Favorite Movie	Beyond the Dream	Nominated
2020	The 3rd Kongest Film Awards	The Kongest Director	Kiwi Chow	Nominated
2020	The 3rd Kongest Film Awards	The Kongest Actress	Cecilia Choi	Won
2020	The 39th Hong Kong Film Awards	Best Actress	Cecilia Choi	Nominated
2020	The 39th Hong Kong Film Awards	Best Director	Kiwi Chow	Nominated
2020	The 39th Hong Kong Film Awards	Best Screenplay	Felix Tsang and Kiwi Chow	Nominated
2020	The 39th Hong Kong Film Awards	Best Cinematography	Danny Szeto	Nominated
2020	The 39th Hong Kong Film Awards	Best Music Score	Duu-Chih Tu and Shu-yao Wu	Nominated
2020	The 39th Hong Kong Film Awards	Best New Performer	Terrance Lau	Nominated
2020	Hong Kong Film Screenwriters Association Award 2020	Best Movie Character of the Year	Terrance Lau	Nominated
2020	Hong Kong Film Screenwriters Association Award 2020	Best Movie Character of the Year	Cecilia Choi	Nominated
2020	Hong Kong Film Screenwriters Association Award 2020	Recommended Screenplay of the Year	Felix Tsang and Kiwi Chow	Nominated
2020	Hong Kong Film Support for the People's Choice Awards 2020	Most Supportive Actress	Cecilia Choi	Nominated
2020	Hong Kong Film Support for the People's Choice Awards 2020	Most Supportive New Performer	Terrance Lau	Nominated
2020	The 57th Golden Horse Awards	Best New Performer	Terrance Lau	Nominated
2020	The 57th Golden Horse Awards	Best Adapted Screenplay	Felix Tsang and Kiwi Chow	Won
2020	The 57th Golden Horse Awards	Best Music Score	Duu-Chih Tu and Shu-yao Wu	Nominated

== Influence ==
=== Set a trend of Tuen Mun fever ===
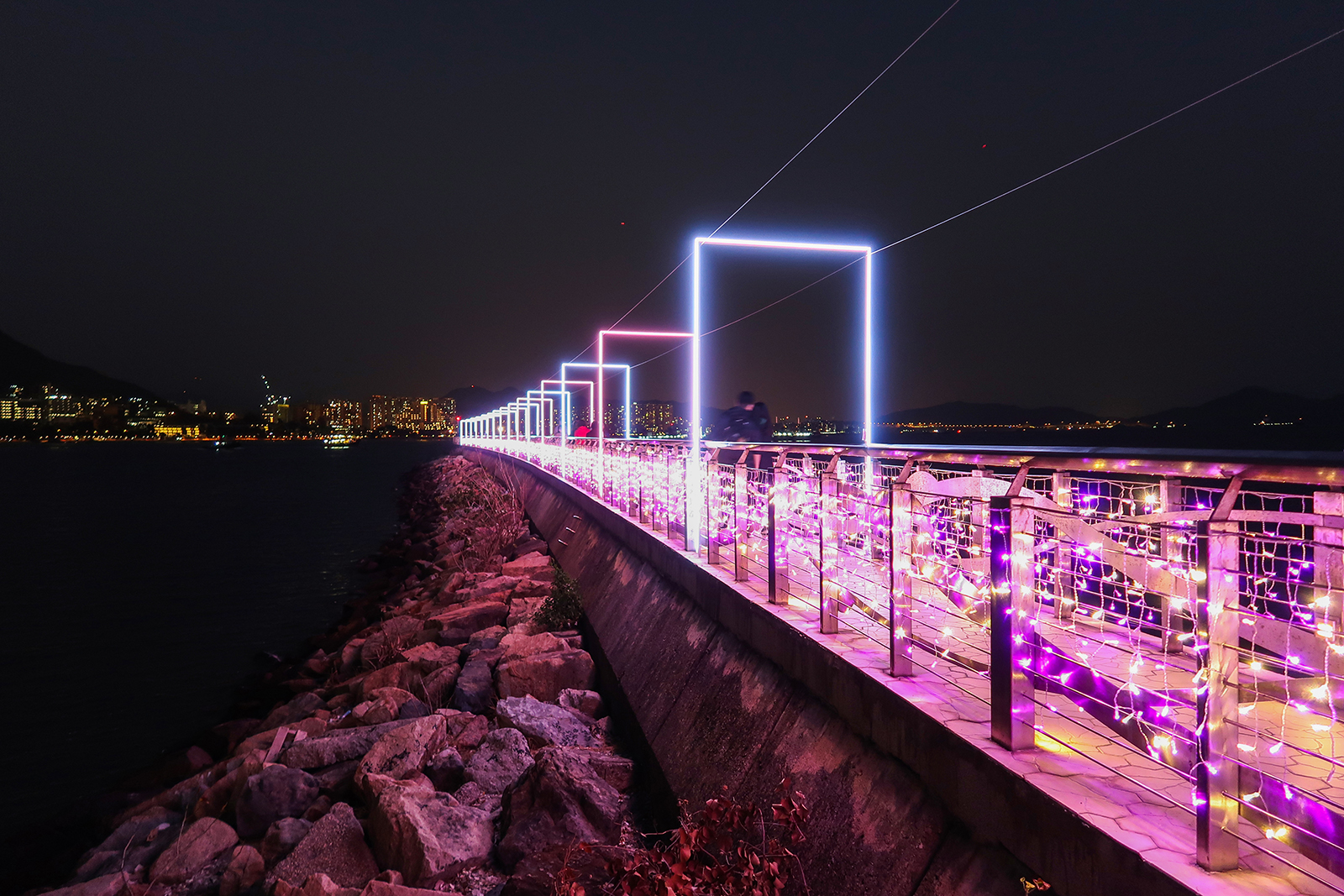
2021年年初設置在屯門碼頭海濱長廊「幻愛橋」的節日裝飾，雖然被《幻愛》導演周冠威批評觀感不好，但成為市民拍攝熱點

The background was set in Tuen Mun, and the filming locations were considered to be very romantic, which like thee Japanese style painting, and attracting the audiences to revisit the filming scenes in groups.

=== Reinvigorating Hong Kong-produced films ===
Affected by the COVID-19 epidemic, there is a shortage of international blockbusters during June and July, and the release of Beyond the Dream made Hong Kong-produced films to fill this window period indirectly. "My Prince Edward" and "Suk Suk" were officially released subsequently, the media collectively referred to the above three films as "3 Treasures of Golden Scene". The "3 Treasures of Golden Scene" not only have their own characteristics, but also arouse different audiences' re-attention to Hong Kong-produced films. It can be regarded as an Indian summer for the Hong Kong films. Those three films were very popular among Hong Kong people, and a variety of peripheral products, such as postcards, novels, theme coffee, etc. were launched rarely in Hong Kong film history.

=== The romance of the leads ===
The male and female leads, Lau and Choi, had known each other prior to filming, but they were not familiar with each other. They gradually fell in love with each other during the filming and became a real couple. In an interview, Lau expressed that during a scene filmed at a light rail station, he released extremely intense emotions causing him to feel exhausted, but constant encouragement from Choi on set made him fall in love. The couple married in 2025.

=== The derivative work by the bus company ===
Kowloon Motor Bus had uploaded a derivative poster on its Facebook page, which was of derivative from the film, the promotional phrase of the poster was "I don't mind—don't you?". The title was "Sit Down", urging passengers to remember to sit still while the bus was moving, and hold the handrail tightly while standing, and wear a mask most importantly to avoid fines. The poster was warmly welcomed by netizens.
