= Revolution of Our Times =

2021 Hong Kong film by Kiwi Chow

- Official poster
- Traditional Chinese: 時代革命
- Directed by: Kiwi Chow
- Music by: Gil Talmi
- Release date: 16 July 2021 (Cannes)
- Running time: 152 minutes
- Country: Hong Kong
- Language: Hong Kong Cantonese

Revolution of Our Times
- Traditional Chinese: 時代革命
- Simplified Chinese: 时代革命
- Literal meaning: (the) age (of) revolution
Transcriptions
Standard Mandarin
- Hanyu Pinyin: Shídài Gémìng
Yue: Cantonese
- Yale Romanization: sìh doih gaak mihng
- Jyutping: si^{4} doi^{6} gaak^{3} ming^{6}

Revolution of Our Times (Chinese: 時代革命) is a 2021 Hong Kong documentary film directed by Kiwi Chow. The film covers the 2019–2020 Hong Kong protests through interviews and footage of the frontline protest scenes. The documentary takes its name from a locally well-known political slogan "liberate Hong Kong, revolution of our times" which has been ruled as illegal by the Hong Kong High Court. The film had its debut in the 2021 Cannes Film Festival in France and is currently banned in mainland China and Hong Kong.

== Synopsis ==
For many years, Hong Kongers have fought for freedoms and democracy but haven't succeeded yet. In 2019, a proposed extradition legislation ignited heated debates in Hong Kong and gave birth to wave after wave of protests. The documentary features seven groups of protesters and pieces their tales together into one big story to chronicle the protest movement.

== Legality issues ==
The documentary gets its name from the second half of a ubiquitous political slogan of "liberate Hong Kong, revolution of our times". In July 2021, three specially designated national security law judges of the Hong Kong High Court unanimously convicted a Hong Kong protester, Tong Ying-kit, for secession and terrorism over ramming his motorcycle into three police officers while flying a flag emblazoned with the slogan. The judges ruled that the display of the phrase was "capable of inciting others to commit secession" and thus violated the national security law implemented in Hong Kong by the central government of China. Per this ruling and the national security law, it is believed that the documentary is also illegal.

In addition, the national security law contains provisions for extraterritorial jurisdiction which means the law covers every person everywhere on earth, including foreign cinemagoers and film festival organisers for their actions outside Hong Kong. Legal scholars have warned that anyone who has done anything that might offend the Hong Kong government should stay out of Hong Kong. Quite a few countries have issued travel warnings about it, including Australia, Canada, Ireland, New Zealand, the UK, and the US.

== Production ==
The documentary is officially credited as produced "by Hong Kongers" as the political situation and legal environment of Hong Kong compels strict secrecy and anonymity over the making of the film. The only individual who was involved in the production of the documentary but has since revealed their own identity is the director, Kiwi Chow. He has explained to the press that the revelation of his identify was his way to fight back against self-censorship.

Yet, other than Chow, all members of the film crew and production team have remained anonymous. Who funded the making of the film is also unknown, but Chow has mentioned that a businessperson invited him to make the documentary. Many individuals had also decided to quit midway during the two-year production of the documentary. Chow has also been deeply grateful to other filmmakers and photographers who had given him a lot of footage and materials to use, especially when one of them had decided to stop creating their own film projects out of fear that they could run into trouble with the controversial national security law implemented in Hong Kong by the central government of China.

The use of the iconic song "Glory to Hong Kong" at the end of the documentary film became embroiled in copyright controversies. DGX Music, composer of the song, accused Kiwi Chow of stealing the song and demanded Chow to remove the soundtrack. Chow apologised for the mistakes over handling of copyrights, but insisted the contract of copyright is still being drafted and is willing to increase the copyright fee. The deadlock was resolved after both sides issued joint statement on 6 April 2022, with DGX Music authorizing the soundtrack in the film for free and apologised for negative impacts caused.

== Screenings, releases, and reception ==
According to Hong Kong's film classification system, "Revolution of Our Times" contains violence and is classified as IIA not suitable for children. However, it has been judged that the action of displaying the phrase "liberate Hong Kong, revolution of our times" is an illegal activity, it is not possible to screen or show the documentary anywhere in its homeland. However, it has been able to screen the film outside Hong Kong as the copyrights, masters, and materials of the film have already been sold abroad. The documentary made its debut in 2021 Cannes Film Festival.

=== Australia ===
Local Hong Kongese expat community organisations in Australia organised special screenings in six major cities, including Adelaide, Brisbane, Canberra, Melbourne, Perth, and Sydney. These screenings were available from 1 April 2022 to 10 April 2022.

=== Canada ===
The film had its first screening in Canada in February 2022 across several cities: Calgary, Edmonton, Toronto, Vancouver, and Victoria. The documentary has been very popular, and tickets quickly sold out. The film was originally intended to be screened in February only, but the organisers decided to have extra screenings in March.

=== France: Cannes Film Festival ===
The 2021 Cannes Film Festival saw the world premiere of the film, but the existence of the film was not known to the public until the day before the awards ceremony. The documentary had long been accepted into the film festival, but it was kept as a secret. The organisers explained that they had done so because the film had not been completed until the very last moment. Yet, it was reported that the film festival organisers had actually been concerned that the potential backlash from Chinese authorities would have caused Chinese filmmakers of other films to withdraw from the festival if the news of the inclusion of the documentary had been made public in advance. In any case, the festival only held a confidential screening of the film to a small group of journalists and waited until the day before the ceremony to make a statement about the film.

=== Japan: Tokyo Filmex ===
Similar to Cannes, the Tokyo Filmex did not make known to the public in advance there would be any screening of the film in case of Chinese sabotage. The documentary got a surprise screening on the last day of the film festival. Even though the announcement of the special showing of the documentary did not get made until the day before, it was reported that the whole venue of 700 seats was full.

=== Taiwan ===
In Taiwan, the documentary was initially scheduled for a four-day premiere during the 2021 Taipei Golden Horse Film Festival. Tickets sold out within one hour of their release. Due to high demand, two additional screenings were added, with tickets selling out within five minutes. The film won Best Documentary at the Golden Horse Awards, often described as the Chinese-speaking world’s equivalent of the Oscars, prompting a prolonged standing ovation and shouts of support for Hong Kong from members of the audience. The documentary saw its first public release in the world in Taiwan on 25 February 2022.

On the night prior to the documentary's public release in Taiwan, its official YouTube channel and trailers were temporarily removed following a significant number of complaints. Several hours later, the content was reinstated after a successful appeal by the film's team in Taiwan.

Taiwanese media reported that Facebook posts containing the documentary's title experienced significantly reduced reach. Additionally, the film's marketing team was reportedly prevented from placing advertisements on the platform, despite submitting a complaint to Facebook.

The film received a positive reception in Taiwan, achieving a record-breaking box office performance for an overseas documentary during its first week of release.

==== Support from local governments and politicians ====
Notably, the documentary has won widespread support from the political class in Taiwan. Some local governments, like Kaohsiung City and Keelung City, even sponsored and hosted special screenings for free for students. The Taipei Economic and Cultural Representative Office in the United States also hosted a screening in Washington, DC.

Many politicians have also come out in support of the public release of the film and even publicly promoted and recommended it to the general public. Taiwanese President Tsai Ing-wen recommended the film to the public through her social media accounts on multiple occasions. In a Tweet written entirely in English, she shared the poster of the documentary and praised, "The Hong Kong people’s courage & commitment to democracy are an inspiration to us all, as we work to preserve our own freedoms & way of life." She also hosted a special screening session on her own for her advisors and supporters.

Taiwanese politicians publicly endorsing the documentary:

- Tsai Ing-wen, President of the Republic of China
- Lai Ching-te, Vice President of the Republic of China
- Su Tseng-chang, Premier of the Republic of China
- You Si-kun, Speaker of parliament
- Lee Yung-te, Minister of Culture
- Lin Chia-lung, Ambassador-at-large
- Lin Yu-chang, Mayor of Keelung City
- Huang Wei-che, Mayor of Tainan
- Lin Chih-chien, Mayor of Hsinchu City
- Cheng Wen-tsan, Mayor of Taoyuan City
- Chen Chi-mai, Mayor of Kaohsiung
- Lin Fei-fan, Deputy Secretary-General of Democratic Progressive Party
- Enoch Wu, Chairman of the Taipei Chapter of Democratic Progressive Party
- More than a dozen of MPs

=== United Kingdom ===
==== Hong Kong Film Festival in UK ====
Revolution of Our Times was first shown in Britain as the opening gala for the very first Hong Kong Film Festival in the UK. Upon the initial release of tickets for online sale, the website experienced technical difficulties due to high traffic volume.

As part of the film festival, the documentary was screened in Bristol, Edinburgh, Manchester, and London. It was reported that long queues were formed outside the cinema an hour before the first British screening started on 19 March 2022. Kiwi Chow also hosted a virtual question-and-answer session after the opening gala.

==== Public release ====
On 26 March 2022, it was announced that the documentary would be publicly released through various commercial cinema chains across the UK. The film's team also revealed that they had not been able to do so even after many attempts prior. However, as a large number of community organisations and expat Hong Kongers in the country joined the worldwide special release project and contacted various cinema chains to arrange private screenings, some of the cinema chains reserved course and proactively got in touch with the film team to organise the public release.

The documentary has been publicly released via commercial cinema chains in the UK since 6 April 2022.

=== United States ===
The start of the premiere week in the US coincided with 2021 Human Rights Day. The film was available at selected cinemas in seven cities: Boston, Chicago, Los Angeles, New York, San Francisco, Seattle, and Washington DC.

=== Worldwide special release project ===
Screening of the film in Poland, April 2022

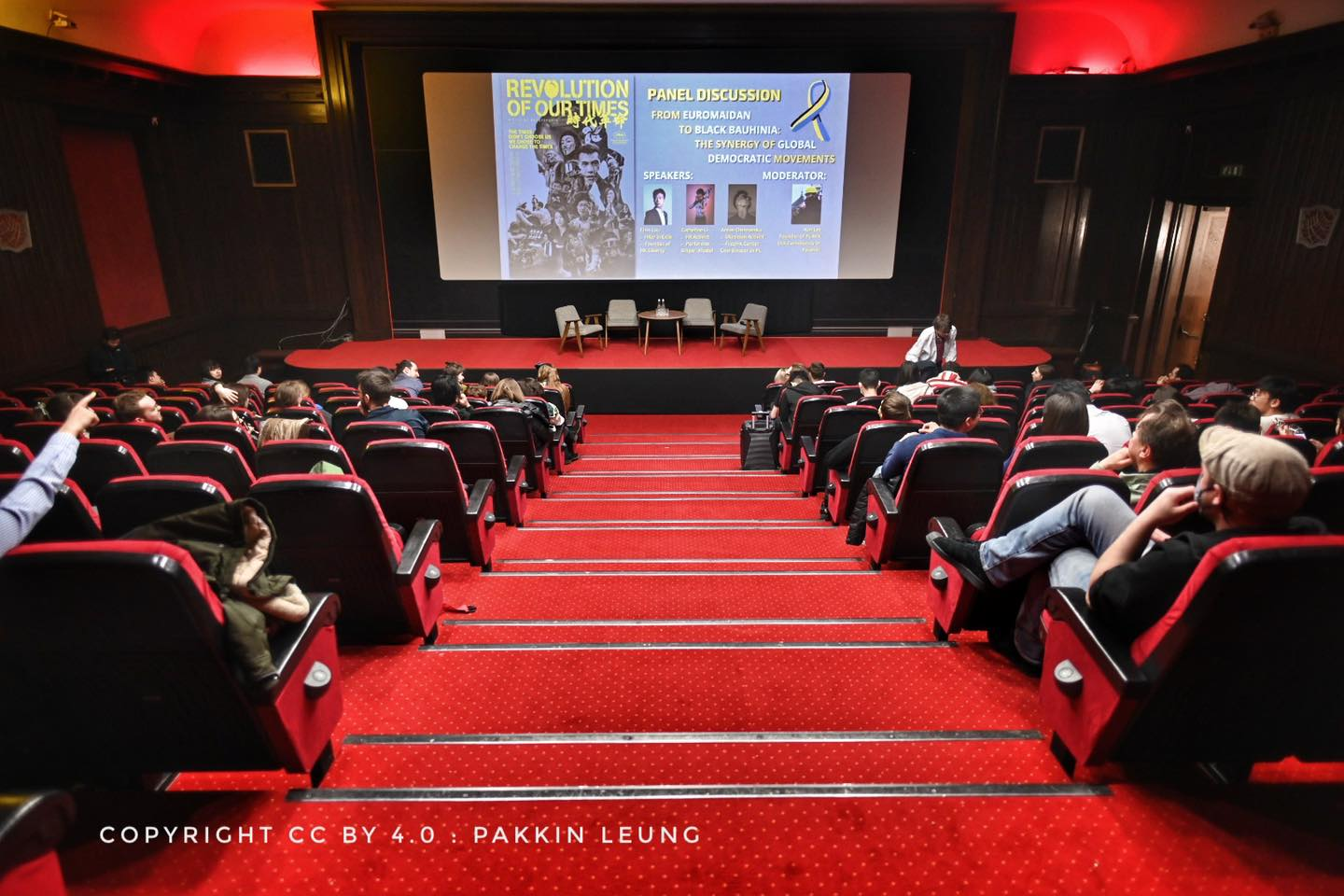
Attendees of the screening

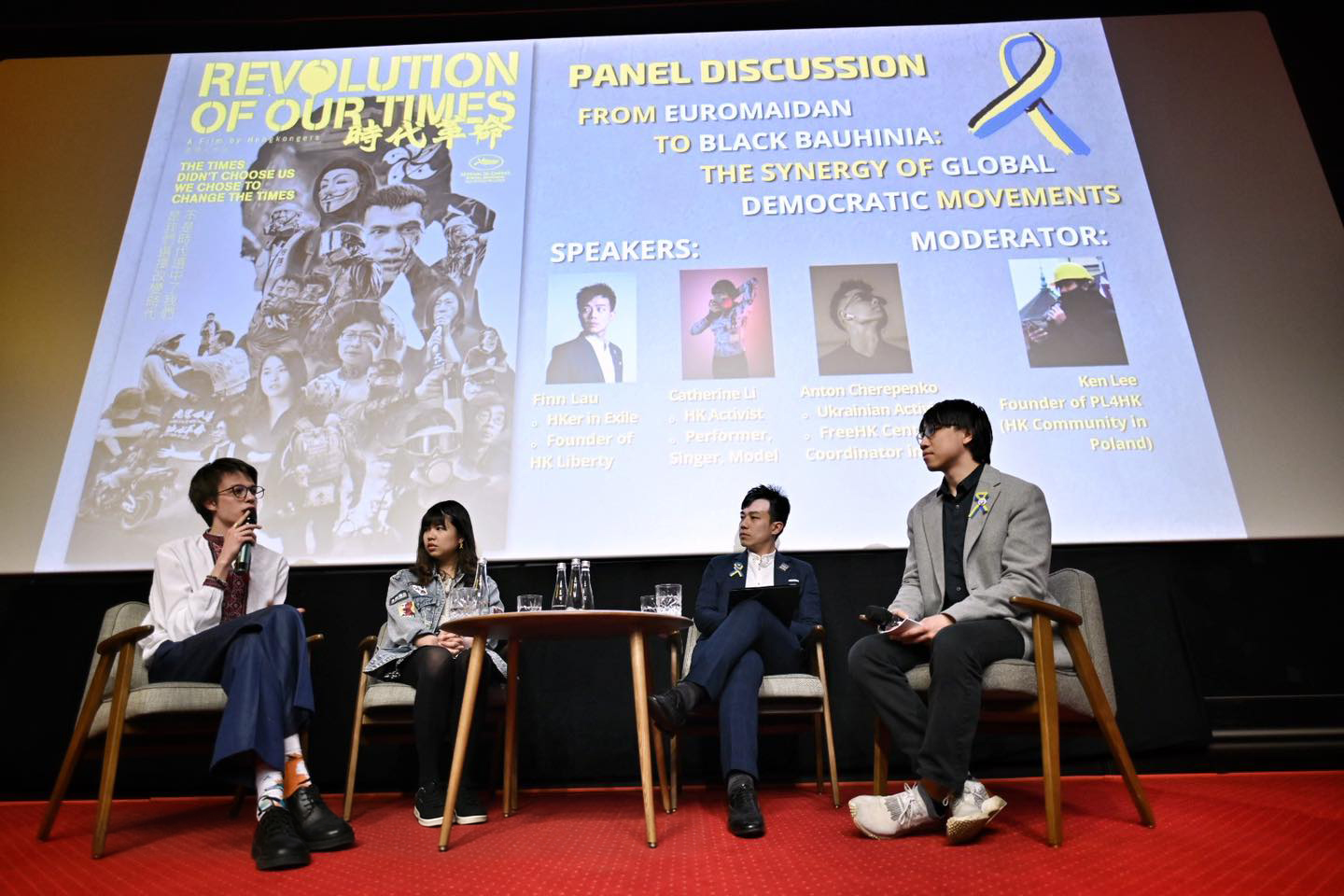
Finn Lau, Hong Kong activist-in-exile in the panel discussion

On 4 March 2022, it was announced that the distributor was planning to have a special release across the globe and extend an invitation to the world, especially Hong Kongers in exile, to come together and take part in the project. The special release would allow participating individuals and civil society organisations to host special screenings for 10 days continuously, starting from 1 April 2022. Each screening would have to have a minimum of 50 seats, but there would be no restriction on the maximum number of screenings a participant could host.

On the first day of the worldwide release, it was announced that near 130 screenings would be hosted throughout the world during the period.

Available Countries during Special Worldwide Release:

- Australia
- Austria
- Belgium
- Czech Republic
- Denmark
- Estonia
- Finland
- France
- Germany
- Ireland
- Lithuania
- Malaysia
- Netherlands
- New Zealand
- Norway
- Philippines
- Poland
- Portugal
- Sweden
- Switzerland
- Taiwan
- Thailand
- United Kingdom
- United States

== Accolades ==
Award/Film Festival	Date of ceremony/Announcement	Category	Recipient(s)	Result	Ref.
Golden Horse Award	27 November 2021	Best Documentary	Kiwi Chow	Won	
Golden Horse Film Festival	28 November 2021	Audience Choice	The film itself	Top 1	
FIPADOC	23 January 2022	Impact Documentary	The film itself	Grand Prize	
FIPADOC	23 January 2022	CNC Cultural Images	The film itself	Grand Prize	
