= A Complicated Story =

2013 Hong Kong film by Kiwi Chow

- Film poster

Chinese name
- Traditional Chinese: 一個複雜故事
- Simplified Chinese: 一个复杂故事
Transcriptions
Standard Mandarin
- Hanyu Pinyin: Yī Gè Fù Zá Gù Shì
Yue: Cantonese
- Jyutping: Jat1 Go3 Feok1 Zaap6 Gu3 Si6
- Directed by: Kiwi Chow
- Screenplay by: Shu Kei; Kiwi Chow
- Based on: A Complicated Story by Yi Shu
- Produced by: Shu Kei; Ding Yun Shan
- Starring: Jacky Cheung; Jacqueline Zhu; Stephanie Che; Zi Yi
- Cinematography: Cheung Wing
- Edited by: Chak Hoi Ling
- Music by: Cheung Ngai
- Production companies: Milkyway Image; Edko Films; Hong Kong Film Development Fund; Big Star Production
- Distributed by: Edko Films
- Release dates: 26 March 2013 (Hong Kong International Film Festival); 16 January 2014 (Hong Kong)
- Running time: 107 minutes
- Country: Hong Kong
- Language: Cantonese

A Complicated Story is a 2013 Hong Kong drama film directed by Kiwi Chow based on the novel of the same title by Yi Shu. The film is headlined by actors Jacky Cheung, Jacqueline Zhu, Stephanie Che, and Zi Yi. The film had its world premiere at the Hong Kong International Film Festival on 26 March 2013, and was theatrically released in Hong Kong on 16 January 2014.

== Cast ==
- Jacky Cheung as Yuk Cheung
- Jacqueline Zhu as Liu Yazi
- Stephanie Che as Kammy Au
- Zi Yi as Law Chun Ming
- Lo Hoi-pang as Wan
- Cherrie Ying as Tracy T.
- Deanie Ip as Gipsy
- Elaine Jin
- Leo Ou-fan Lee
- John Shum as Steven
- Tina Lau
