= Liberate Hong Kong, revolution of our times =

Hong Kong political slogan

- Traditional Chinese: 光復香港，時代革命
- Simplified Chinese: 光复香港，时代革命
- Cantonese Yale: Gwōngfuhk Hēunggóng, sìhdoih gaakmihng
Transcriptions
Standard Mandarin
- Hanyu Pinyin: Guāngfù Xiānggǎng, shídài gémìng
Yue: Cantonese
- Yale Romanization: Gwōngfuhk Hēunggóng, sìhdoih gaakmihng
- Jyutping: Gwong1fuk6 Hoeng1gong2, si4doi6 gaak3ming6

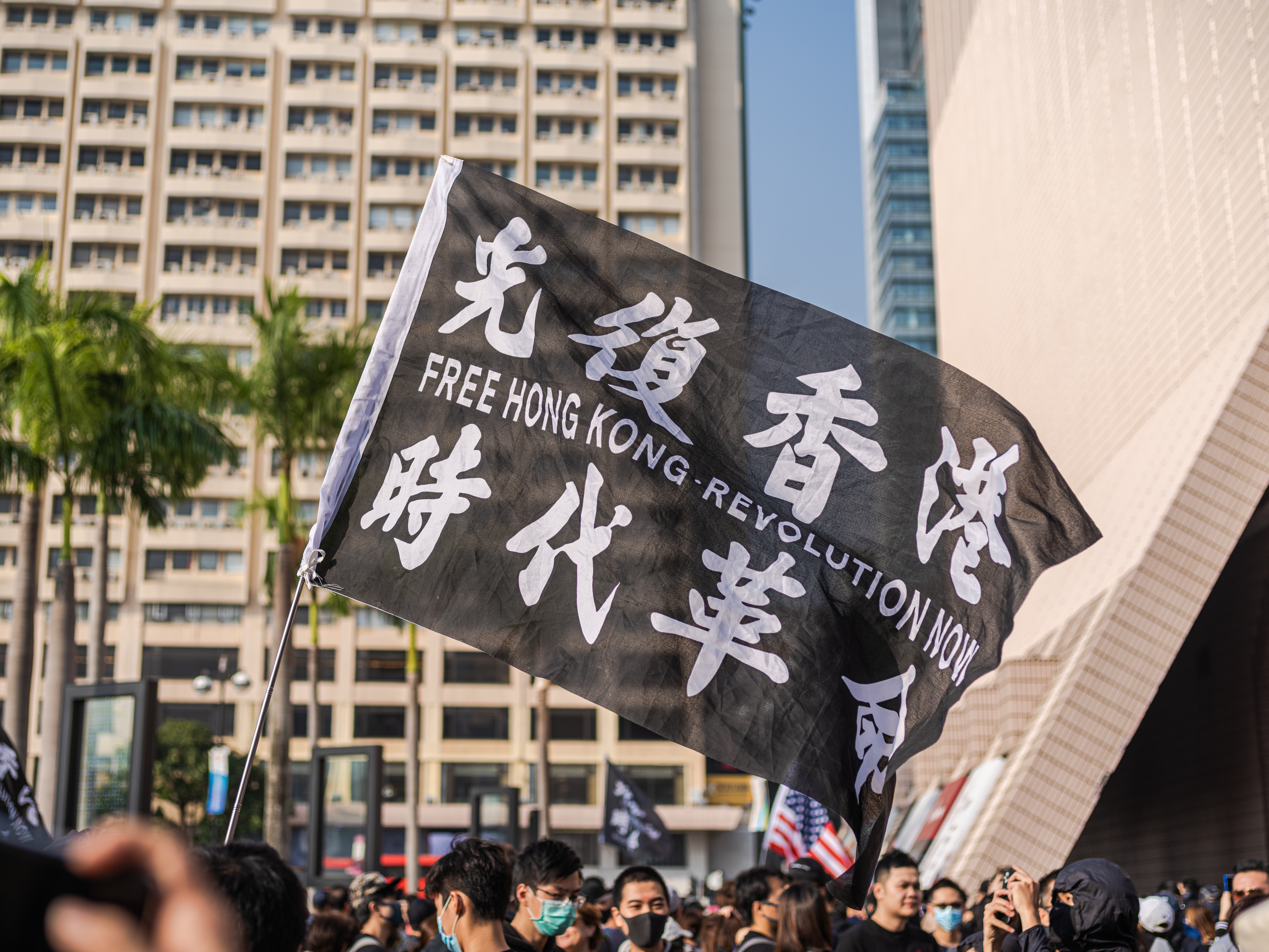
A flag with the slogan at an anti-extradition bill protest

"Liberate Hong Kong, revolution of our times" (Chinese: 光復香港，時代革命; also translated variously) is a slogan used by social movements in Hong Kong. The slogan was first used in 2016 by Hong Kong Indigenous spokesman Edward Leung as his campaign theme and slogan for the 2016 New Territories East by-election. He emphasised that anyone could take part in innovation and change regardless of age, hence the use of the phrase "revolution of our times." In the legislative election held later that year, Youngspiration, which was cooperating with Hong Kong Indigenous as Leung was banned from running by the Electoral Affairs Commission, also used the slogan for their campaign.

The slogan underwent a resurgence in 2019 as Hongkongers started using it for the protests against Hong Kong's extradition bill, leading to international attention. Annie Zhang, the former editor in chief of Initium Media, said the slogan was a strong wish for an escalation of tactics and a revolution, stating the wish of protesters for "Hong Kong to become a Hong Kong for Hongkongers." In contrast, former Chief Executive of Hong Kong Tung Chee-hwa, pro-Beijing political parties, editor of the Global Times Hu Xijin, and Xinhua News Agency consider the slogan to involve Hong Kong independence and test the principle of "one country, two systems."

Beginning in July 2020, the Hong Kong government announced that anyone who uses the slogan can be prosecuted under the newly implemented national security law. In a landmark ruling a year later, the first person to be charged was found guilty for displaying a banner bearing the slogan. The court ruled that such display constituted incitement of others to commit secession.

== Origin ==
"Liberate Hong Kong, revolution of our times" was first suggested by Hong Kong localist camp activist Edward Leung as a slogan for social movements. Leung has continually advocated Hong Kong independence and localism and self-determination, considering Hong Kong to be a sovereign state, Hongkongers to be of the same group, and hoping to unite the "inner strength" of Hongkongers. At the press conference where Leung originally announced his bid for the 2016 New Territories East by-election, his campaign slogan was "Walk the talk, innovation for our generation" (知行合一，世代革新). However, campaigners brainstormed another slogan in January 2016, as they considered the original slogan to be unable to attract voters to vote, alienating younger and older generations, and that its stance was not clear enough.

The term "liberate" (光復) was first used by the Guangfuhui (Restoration Society), founded in Shanghai in 1904, and by the revolutionaries of the Tongmenghui (Revolutionary Alliance), the predecessor to the Kuomintang. Its first use in Hong Kong's localist movement was in Reclaim Sheung Shui Station in 2012. In its early stages, Hong Kong Indigenous was most notable for its opposition to parallel trading in Hong Kong, and its series of "liberation protests" organised in 2015 in places like Tuen Mun, Sha Tin, Yuen Long and Sheung Shui in the New Territories. Thus, the use of the term "liberate" in its campaign slogan was to remind voters of the group's use of street resistance to advocate Hongkongers' rights. Although the by-election was held in the New Territories East constituency, "Liberate Hong Kong" was chosen over "Liberate New Territories East" (光復新東) because the latter was more difficult to pronounce. The second half of the slogan was a modification of "generational innovation" in the original slogan, with "revolution" reflecting the group's political ideals and ideological position.

Between "revolution of our times" (時代革命) and "revolution of our generation" (世代革命), Leung opted for "revolution of our times" as the campaign slogan to emphasise that innovation and change can be undertaken by people of all ages, and that it would not be a conflict between different generations because it only requested people to believe and embrace liberty. He also pointed out that a belief in liberty is enough to embrace a new generation, and that people should grasp and advocate for their future. At the same time, he also said that many people were unwilling to give in to totalitarianism and the existing political framework, believing that they can have a government for themselves. After his bid for the 2016 Hong Kong legislative election was disqualified, he said that Hong Kong had become a dictatorship, adding that revolution was the only solution to the situation at hand.

== Translation variations ==
Various English translations of the slogan have emerged since it became more widely used by anti-establishment protesters. The English version of Edward Leung's election platform used the translation "Ignite revolution to reclaim our Hong Kong, our age." Other variations include:

- "Liberate Hong Kong, revolution of our time"
- "Liberate Hong Kong, the revolution of our times"
- "Liberate Hong Kong, revolution of our age"
- "Free Hong Kong, revolution now"
- "Reclaim Hong Kong, revolution of our times"

== Usage ==
=== 2016 Legislative Council campaigns ===
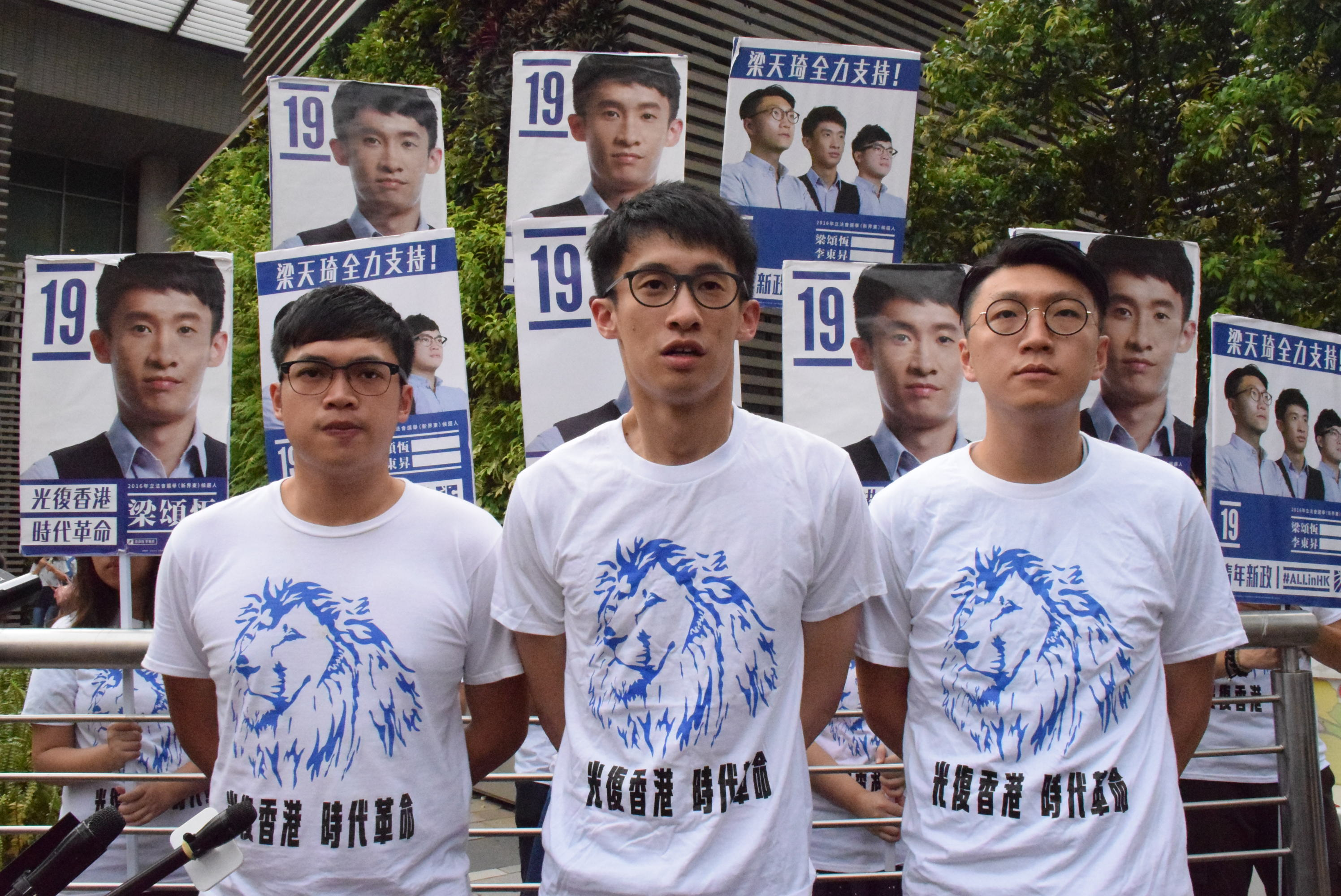
Hong Kong Indigenous politicians at a campaign press conference in 2016, wearing shirts featuring the slogan

In January 2016, Edward Leung announced his candidacy for the Legislative Council's New Territories East by-election, with the main purpose being the promotion of the ideologies of Hong Kong Indigenous and the localist camp. Previously, Hong Kong Indigenous suggested "Safeguarding local values with force" in order to achieve the goal of "My city, therefore I defend it." On 8 February the same year, after the Mong Kok civil unrest, Leung presented "Liberate Hong Kong, revolution of our times" and "Confronting violence with force" as campaign themes and slogans. The Registration and Electoral Office allowed "Liberate Hong Kong, revolution of our times" to be listed in Leung's election platform in their election guide, but refused to deliver his pamphlets for free because the Office considered the use of the terms "autonomy" and "self-rule" to be a "fundamental breach" of Article 1 of the Basic Law.

During the election, Leung advocated the stances of "Using force to resist violence" and "Liberate Hong Kong," leading to a polarised public opinion. Although forceful resistance and the Hong Kong independence movement attracted mainstream attention in Hong Kong, it also led to resistance from the Government of Hong Kong and the traditional pro-democracy camp. After his arrest following the Mong Kok civil unrest, his popularity increased, with many in the localist camp expressing support for him. He came third in the by-election, receiving 66,524 votes or 15.38% of the vote, of which the majority was from young voters. Subsequently, the radical localist camp in Hong Kong represented by Leung also received support from many young people.

In the LegCo election held later that year, Youngspiration also used "Liberate Hong Kong, revolution of our times" as their campaign slogan, naming three candidates including Baggio Leung and Yau Wai-ching. After the election, the localist camp faced severe restrictions on their ability to participate in politics, with both Leung and Yau being disqualified from LegCo in the oath-taking controversy, and the Hong Kong National Party, another localist group, being banned. In June 2018, the High Court sentenced Leung to six years imprisonment for taking part in a riot on the night of the unrest and assaulting a police officer during the protests, while acquitting him of inciting a riot.

=== 2019–2020 Hong Kong protests ===
Protesters chant the slogan while protesting outside the Hong Kong Liaison Office on 21 July 2019.

During the 2019–2020 Hong Kong protests, protesters initially focused on opposing the introduction of the government-proposed extradition bill. At first, they used slogans such as "Be water," "No injury, no bleeding, no arrest; no disassociation, no snitching, no blaming," "We fight on, each in his own way," "Nobody left behind," etc. By mid-July, as the demonstrations had spread to more districts, the spectrum of protests widened, and the public had grown more tolerant of the use of force by protesters.

Around that time, more and more young people started reminiscing Edward Leung. Protesters stuck posters reading "Liberate Hong Kong, revolution of our times" on Lennon Walls in the districts of Sha Tin and Tai Po, sometimes with "Thank You Edward Leung" written next to the posters. Protesters also commonly used the colloquial Cantonese term "攬炒," which means "mutual destruction," as well as the slogan "If we burn, you burn with us." As the protests escalated and became more frequent, "Liberate Hong Kong, revolution of our times" gained popularity as a slogan among protesters.

On 21 July, protesters stormed the China Liaison Office, chanting the slogan. At around 7:45 pm, protesters hurled eggs and ink balloons at the building, with some ink hitting the building's Chinese emblem. Police dispersed the crowd with tear gas and rubber bullets. In response, political parties and LegCo members of the pro-Beijing camp issued a joint statement, in which they said the behaviour of "liberation" and "revolution" promoted Hong Kong independence and were illegal acts against the Basic Law and the principle of one country, two systems.

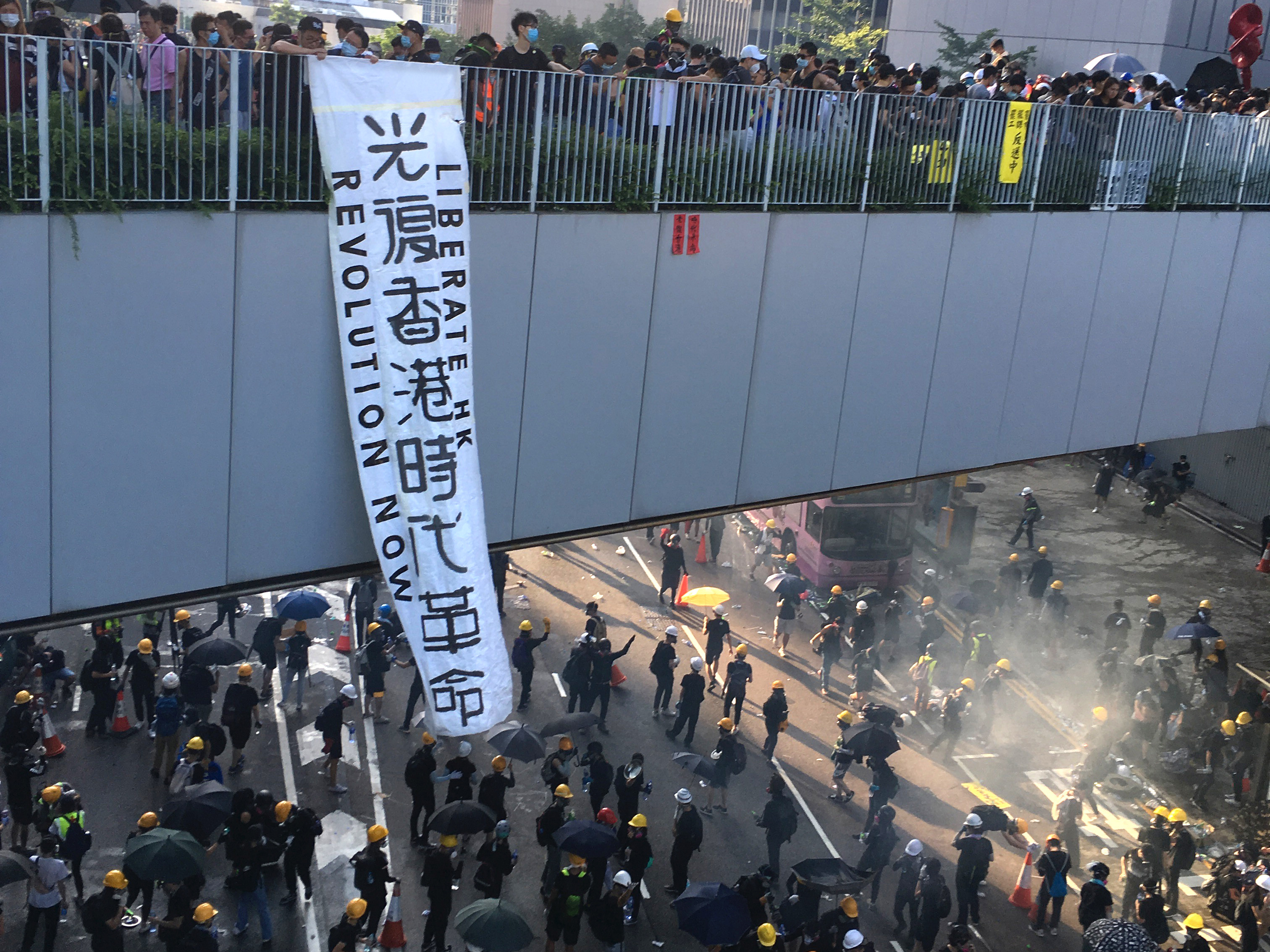
Protesters unfurl a banner with the slogan on a footbridge over Harcourt Road in Admiralty, 5 August 2019

Protesters organised a general strike and gatherings in seven districts on 5 August. On that day, Chief Executive of Hong Kong Carrie Lam condemned the slogan, saying that the slogan advocates revolution and challenges Chinese sovereignty. In response, many non-governmental organisations rebuked Lam's remarks as an attempt to defame the anti-extradition bill movement; for example, the Scholars' Alliance for Academic Freedom said that the slogan, which had been used in social movements since 2015, meant emphasising innovation and change and campaigning for rights via action; it did not carry a meaning of Hong Kong independence and did not ask for an actual revolution.

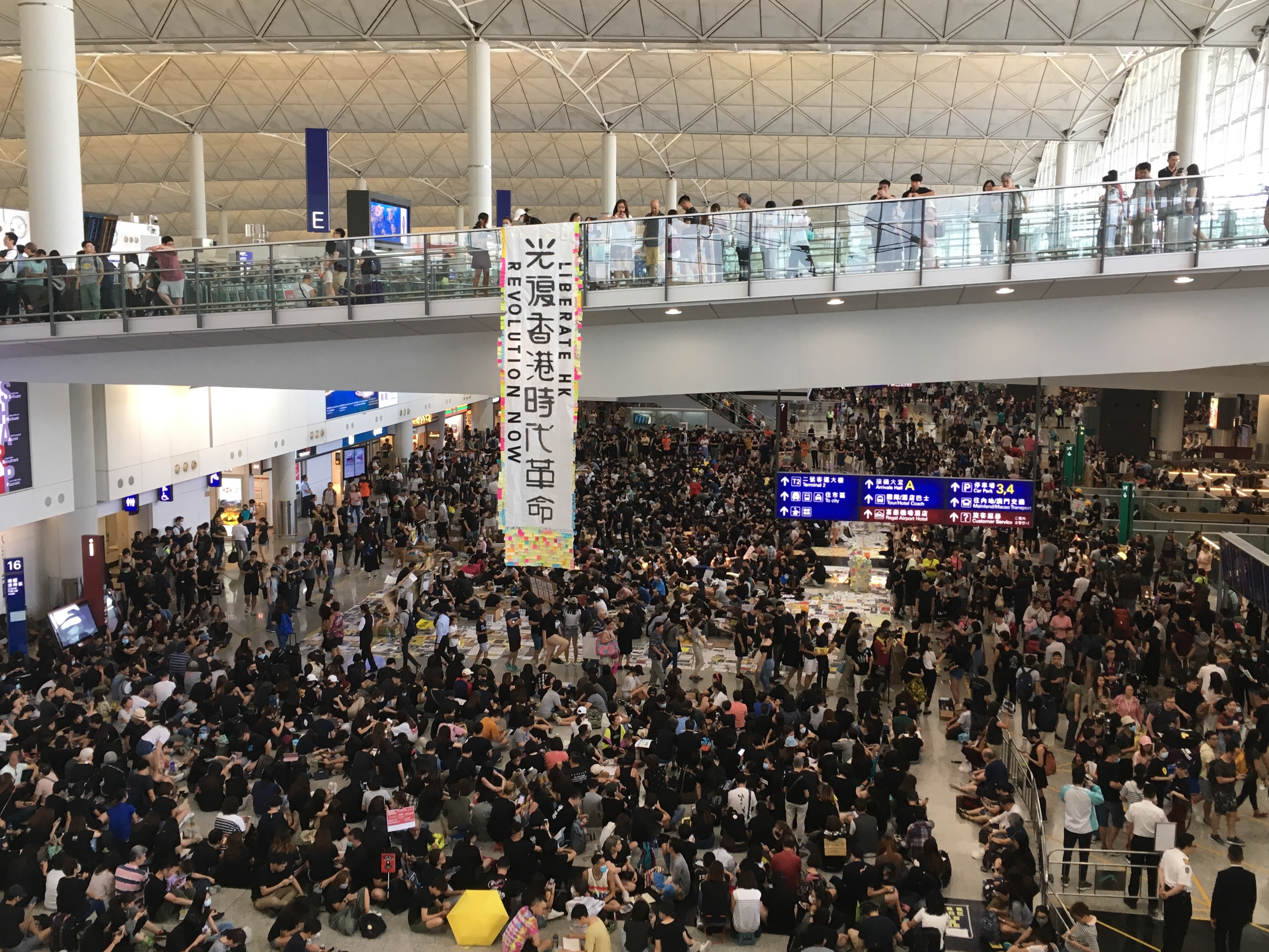
A protester unfurls a handwritten banner with the slogan over a footbridge inside Hong Kong International Airport, 10 August 2019

During the Hong Kong International Airport sit-ins held between 9 and 11 August, a protester unfurled a banner carrying the slogan (modified as "Liberate HK, Revolution Now") from a footbridge inside the airport terminal. Protesters at the scene cheered and clapped, chanting the slogan multiple times. Protesters jeered and aimed laser pointers at the banner in support when Airport Authority staff requested that the banner be removed.

The slogan is incorporated in the lyrics of "Glory to Hong Kong," a song created in August and soon became the anthem of the protests. When people gathered to sing the song in public, the slogan is often chanted after the song.

==== Hearthstone controversy ====
On 6 October 2019, during a post-match interview at the Hearthstone Grandmasters streaming event in Taiwan, Ng Wai Chung, a professional Hearthstone player and Hong Kong resident professionally known as "Blitzchung," donned a gas mask similar to those worn by Hong Kong protesters, and uttered the phrase "Liberate Hong Kong, revolution of our times" in Mandarin. Blitzchung's camera feed was cut off shortly after. The following day, Blizzard Entertainment, the developer of Hearthstone, announced that Blitzchung had been banned from the current tournament, forfeiting any prize money (approximately US$4,000 by that point), and was banned for any further Grandmasters tournaments for one year. Blitzchung stated in an interview afterwards that he had done the act of protest because "I put so much effort in that social movement in the past few months, that I sometimes couldn't focus on preparing my Grandmaster match." In addition, Blizzard terminated the contracts of the two stream casters who had been conducting the interview, "Virtual" and "Mr. Yee."

Many felt that Blizzard was cautious of potential repercussions from China's government, which has been censoring any support for the Hong Kong protests, including recent actions directed towards the National Basketball Association and South Park, after the premiere of the episode "Band in China" the same week. Additionally, as Blizzard is partially owned by the Chinese technology giant Tencent through Activision Blizzard, there were also concerns that the business relationship between Blizzard and Tencent was also at stake. Others spoke out that Blizzard's actions were unacceptable, as it appears to make them an agent for the Chinese government. Some United States lawmakers such as Senators Ron Wyden and Marco Rubio spoke out against the ban. Several long-term players of Blizzard's games discussed a boycott of Blizzard to encourage Blizzard to revoke the ban on Blitzchung. On Twitter, the hashtag #BoycottBlizzard trended worldwide, with notable participation of former Blizzard employee and World of Warcraft team lead Mark Kern, who showed he was cancelling his subscription to his own game. Supporters of the Hong Kong protest began to use Blizzard's own Overwatch character Mei, a Chinese native, as a sign of support for Blitzchung and the protests following the ban.

==== In video games ====
In October 2019, an anonymous developer under the pseudonym "Spinner of Yarns" released the Android game The Revolution of Our Times, a choice-based story game where the player roleplays as a Hong Kong protester during 2019–2020 protests. The app was removed from the Play Store within a week of its announcement for violating Google's "sensitive events policy." Another game Liberate Hong Kong was also released.

== Impact of the 2020 national security law ==
On 1 July 2020, the day after the Hong Kong national security law entered into force, ten protesters who carried or displayed flags or banners which contained the slogan or variations of it were arrested for violating the national security law. This included a 19-year-old male who was arrested for a sticker on his smartphone case which read "Free Hong Kong, Revolution Now," as well as stickers in his bag. Also on 1 July 2020, Tong Ying-kit, a 24-year-old waiter, became the first person charged under the security law after he struck police officers with his motorcycle while carrying a flag with the slogan printed on it.

On 2 July, the Hong Kong government issued a statement declaring the slogan as having separatist and subversive connotations, and that it may seek to prosecute those displaying or chanting the slogan under the new law. The national security law, combined with the government statement on the slogan, has caused some pro-democracy businesses and media to remove material that became potentially illegal. Some Hong Kong bookstores covered the phrase with tape when it appeared on book covers. Dennis Kwok, the LegCo member representing the Legal functional constituency, described the government statement as literary inquisition (文字獄) and that it suppresses freedom of speech, in contrast with previous statements by the government that it would not criminalise speech. Maria Tam, vice-president of the NPCSC's Basic Law Committee, said that she had long considered the slogan to be problematic, and that it was a leakage (走漏) that no candidates were disqualified from the 2019 Hong Kong local elections for using the slogan.

== Debate on connotations ==
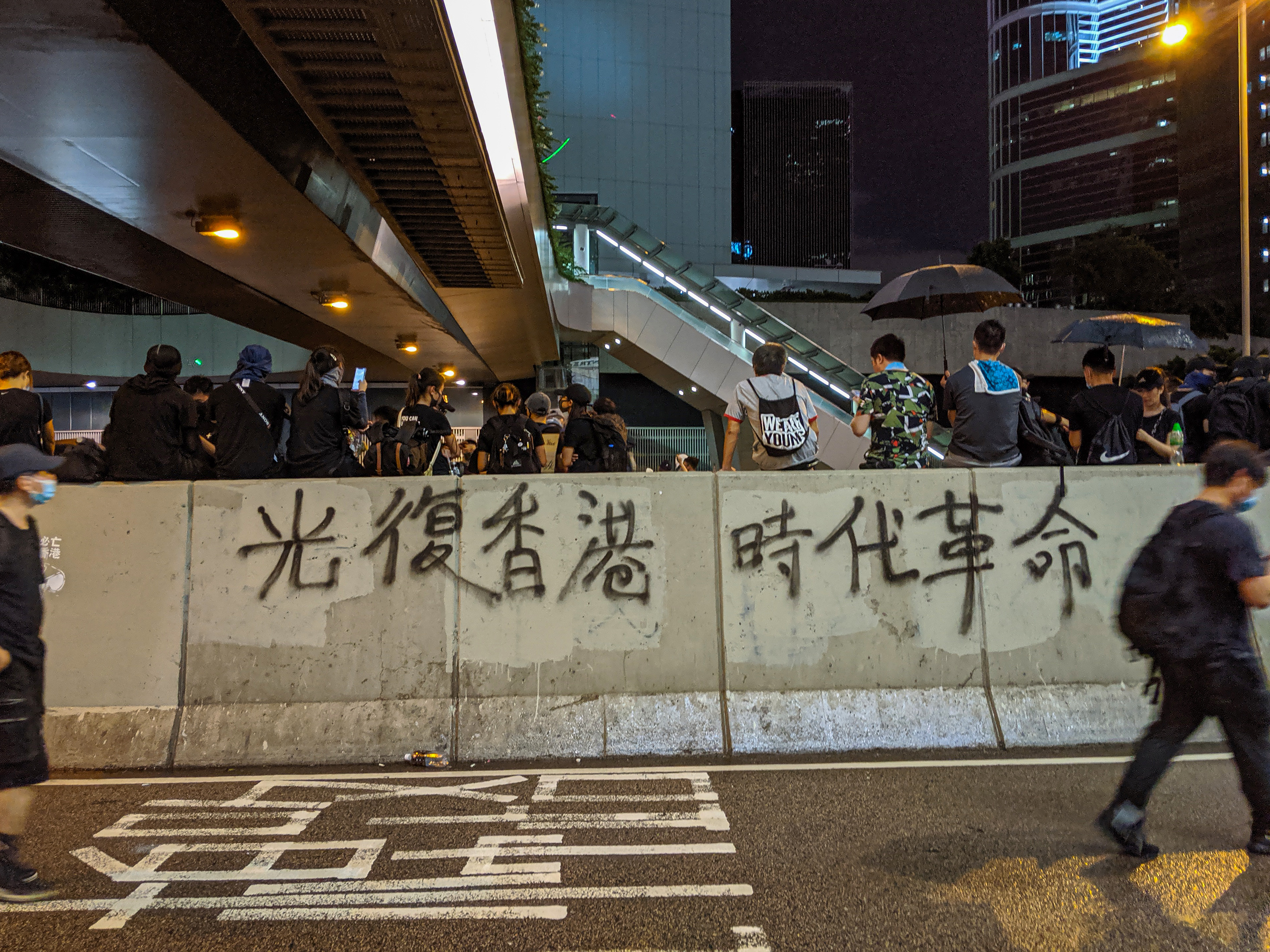
Graffiti of the slogan in front of the Central Government Complex in Tamar, 18 August 2019

The use of the slogan for protests initially led to significant debate online. Annie Zhang, the former editor in chief of Initium Media, said that the slogan was the result of the protest movement not achieving its goals, leading to a strong wish for an escalation of tactics and a revolution. She said that "the people of this generation needed Hong Kong to become a Hong Kong for Hongkongers." Teddy Tang, chairman of the Hong Kong Association of the Heads of Secondary Schools, said that the slogan demonstrated the belief held by protesters that what they were doing was just, and that they were willing to deal with any consequences in achieving their goals.

Vice Chairperson of the Chinese People's Political Consultative Conference and former Chief Executive of Hong Kong Tung Chee-hwa said that protesters' behaviour began challenging the principle of "one country, two systems" and the Central People's Government's authority when the protests turned from surrounding the legislature to storming the Liaison Office and the slogans turned from "anti-extradition bill" to "Liberate Hong Kong, revolution of our times." Hu Xijin, editor in chief of the Global Times, published an opinion piece on Sina Weibo, in which he said that the use of the "extremist slogan" "Liberate Hong Kong, revolution of our times" by "radical protesters" in Hong Kong causes people to think of colour revolutions and the Hong Kong independence movement. In August 2019, a Xinhua News Agency opinion piece thought that the term "liberate" demonstrated the "political conspiracy" of "radical figures" in Hong Kong, "severely challenging the baseline of 'one country, two systems'."

In 2016, the Registration and Electoral Office considered "Liberate Hong Kong, revolution of our times" to be a "fundamental breach" of Article 1 of the Basic Law. In 2019, chairman of the Hong Kong Federation of Trade Unions Wong Kwok thought that the slogan may potentially encourage Hong Kong independence, and that violence cannot solve problems, but would rather increase tension in society. Chan Wai-keung, lecturer at the Hong Kong Polytechnic University College of Professional and Continuing Education, said that using the slogan signalled an intention of protesters to overthrow the existing regime, and that the rise of the Hong Kong independence movement had already reached a point where it affects national security. Gideon Rachman of the Financial Times opined that protesters chanting the slogan and their "radical sentiment" should alarm the Government of China. LegCo member Junius Ho thought that the slogan promoted Hong Kong independence and should be banned from demonstrations.

Following the entering into effect of the 2020 national security law, scholars and politicians from mainland China and Hong Kong have expressed various interpretations on the slogan's connotations. The Chinese word used for "liberate" in the slogan is "光復," meaning to reclaim or recapture, as opposed to "解放," the usual Chinese translation of "to liberate." Tam Yiu-chung, a pro-Beijing politician and NPCSC member, expressed on a radio talk show that the term "liberate" (光復) does not carry a positive connotation and should be avoided. On the same radio programme, Albert Chen Hung-yee, a professor of the University of Hong Kong, said that there exist "grey areas" regarding the slogan, and that simply displaying or chanting the slogan may not necessarily result directly in an offence. Helena Wong, a LegCo member from the Democratic Party, disputed the government's interpretation, saying that she considered the phrase "liberate Hong Kong" to mean a return to "true and uneroded one country, two systems" and freedom of speech which previously existed in Hong Kong, rather than having connotations of Hong Kong independence.

On 27 July 2021, three judges specially designated by the Chief Executive of Hong Kong to try cases under the national security law convicted the first person to be charged under the law of "incitement to secession" for displaying a banner bearing the slogan. The court ruling stated that such display of the words was capable of inciting others to commit secession.

== Effect ==
Some protesters who went to the Liaison Office on 21 July 2019 considered the actions that night to be a revolution, reusing the slogan "Liberate Hong Kong, revolution of our times" for the protests. The slogan has been used by some candidates in the 2019 District Council elections. A number of candidates who used the slogan in Facebook posts, including Tommy Cheung, Liu Qing and Billy Chan Shiu-yeung, received letters from Returning Officers questioning the meaning of the slogan. In his publicly published response, Cheung stated that "liberate Hong Kong" referred to a return of Hong Kong to an era when citizens enjoyed various freedoms, whereas "revolution of our times" referred to a need for large social changes rather than a movement to overturn the regime.

Following the July 2020 government statement on the legality of the slogan, a Facebook spokesperson said that when the company processes requests by governments to remove content, it would reject requests that violate international human rights law as much as possible. Anita Yip, vice-president of the Hong Kong Bar Association, said on a radio programme that she "cannot agree" that the slogan alone is enough to prosecute a person under the national security law. She argued that the government's statement on the slogan's legality carries no legal weight and cannot be submitted as evidence in court.

== See also ==
- 2014 Hong Kong protests
- Art of the 2019–2020 Hong Kong protests
- Black Bauhinia flag
- "Glory to Hong Kong"
- Lennon Wall (Hong Kong)
- Liberate Hong Kong, a 2019 video game
- Revolution of Our Times, a 2021 documentary
