= Law with Two Phases =

1984 Hong Kong film by Danny Lee

- Film poster
- Directed by: Danny Lee
- Written by: Danny Lee
- Produced by: Frankie Chan; Guy Lai
- Starring: Danny Lee
- Cinematography: Chan Hwa Ming
- Edited by: Fung Shui
- Music by: Wai Lam
- Distributed by: Always Good Film Co. Ltd.
- Release date: 17 June 1984
- Running time: 95 minutes
- Country: Hong Kong
- Language: Cantonese

Law with Two Phases (traditional Chinese: 公僕; simplified Chinese: 公仆; pinyin: Gong pu; Cantonese Yale: Gung buk), also known as Law with Two Faces, is a 1984 Hong Kong film written and directed by the film's lead star Danny Lee in his second directorial outing.

== Reception ==
=== Impact on Hong Kong cinema ===
Law with Two Phases launched Danny Lee's career as an actor. At the time, Lee was not well known to Chinese audiences, having appeared in low-budget productions such Heroic Cops, a film which marked early appearances by then-unknowns Chow Yun-fat and Ng Man Tat.

Hong Kong films centering on Hong Kong police at the time often relied on comedy rather than action. The American film Dirty Harry is said to have inspired filmmakers to bring a more true-to-life representation of life "behind the shield" to the screen (it is probably no small coincidence that Lee later named his production company "Magnum", after Harry Callahan's weapon of choice).

Lee's performance in the film earned him a Hong Kong Film Award, as well as a Golden Horse Award. The film also helped usher in a new version of the police drama with its own visual styles and trademarks, such as everything being painted in shades of grey, and tinged with social resonance and blows of violence. The gritty, almost documentary-like style and cinematography was a bold charge against the almost cartoonish look of many action films of the time, and audiences, critics, and fellow directors responded.

=== Awards and accolades ===
At the 4th Hong Kong Film Awards, Danny Lee won Best Actor for his performance in Law with Two Phases. The film was also nominated for Best Director (Lee) and Best Supporting Actor (Tai Bo). Lee also won Best Leading Actor at the 21st Golden Horse Awards, where it was further nominated for Best Narrative Feature and Best Supporting Actor in Tai Bo.
