= Kiwi Chow =

Hong Kong film director (born 1979)

- 周冠威
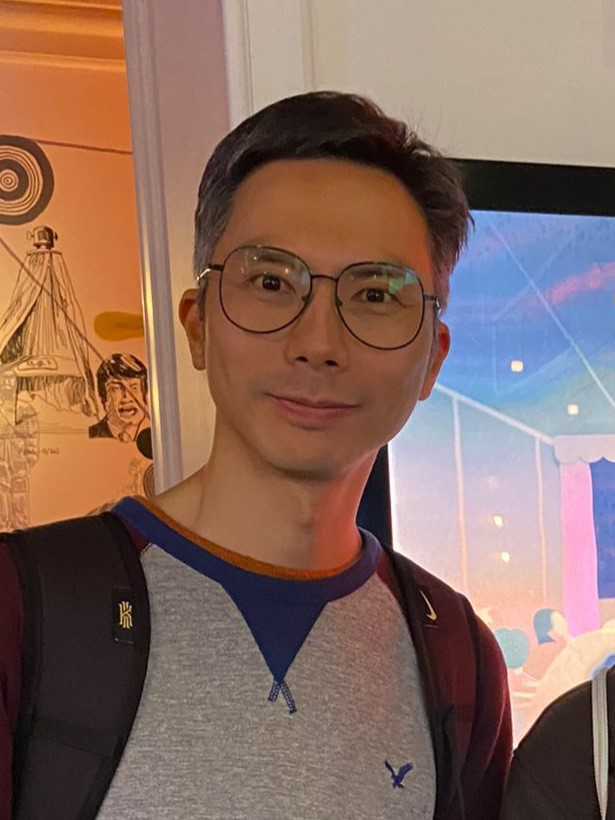
- Chow in 2023
- Born: 16 April 1979; Hong Kong
- Education: Bachelor of Fine Arts, Hong Kong Academy for Performing Arts Master of Film Production, Hong Kong Academy for Performing Arts Ancestral hometown: Dongguan city, Guangdong province
- Occupations: Director, producer, screenwriter
- Notable work: Beyond the Dream; Ten Years; Revolution of Our Times

Kiwi Chow Kwun-wai
- Chinese: 周冠威
Transcriptions
Standard Mandarin
- Hanyu Pinyin: Zhōu Guànwēi
Yue: Cantonese
- Jyutping: zau1 gun3 wai1

Kiwi Chow Kwun-wai (Chinese: 周冠威; born 16 April 1979) is a Hong Kong filmmaker.

== Career ==
Since his graduation, Kiwi Chow has participated in different processes of film production, including as a continuity supervisor, editor, and assistant director. Since 2005, he has been working as a guest lecturer at the Hong Kong Academy for Performing Arts. In 2013, his first feature-length film A Complicated Story had its world premiere at the Hong Kong International Film Festival. His most successful and well-known film Ten Years won the Best Film Award at the 35th Hong Kong Film Awards. He released his third feature-length film Beyond the Dream in 2020. It was among the top ten highest-grossing films in Hong Kong that year.

In 2021, Chow's new film Revolution of Our Times, a documentary about the 2019–2020 Hong Kong protests, was invited to be shown in the "Special Screening" section of the 2021 Cannes Film Festival. This film also won the Golden Horse Award for Best Documentary in 2021.

== Feature films ==
Year	Title	Role					Note
Year	Title	Director	Screenwriter	Producer	Editor	Actor	Note
2013	A Complicated Story	Yes	Yes				
2015	Ten Years: Self-immolator	Yes	Yes		Yes	Yes	Anthology film segment
2020	Beyond the Dream	Yes	Yes	Yes			
2021	Revolution of Our Times	Yes			Yes		Documentary
2023	Say I Do To Me	Yes	Yes	Yes			
2025	Deadline	Yes					
