= Old Mao's Second Spring =

1984 film

- Film poster
- Directed by: Lee You-ning
- Written by: Wu Nien-jen
- Produced by: Lin Yung-feng; Sun Ming-chuan; Sibelle Hu
- Starring: Sun Yueh; Chang Chun-fang
- Cinematography: Chang Hui-kung
- Music by: Lee Shou-chuan
- Production companies: Cos Films Co., Ltd.
- Release date: 31 July 1984
- Running time: 90 minutes
- Country: Taiwan
- Language: Mandarin

Old Mao's Second Spring (lit. 'Lao Mo de di er ge chun tian') is a 1984 Taiwanese drama film directed by Lee You-ning. The film was selected as the Taiwanese entry for the Best Foreign Language Film at the 57th Academy Awards, but was not accepted as a nominee. It won the Golden Horse Award for Best Feature Film in 1984.

== Cast ==
- Sun Yueh as Lao Mo
- Chang Chun-fang as Yumei

== See also ==
- List of submissions to the 57th Academy Awards for Best Foreign Language Film
- List of Taiwanese submissions for the Academy Award for Best Foreign Language Film
