= Luo Pei-ying =

Taiwanese television personality and actress (1960–2020)

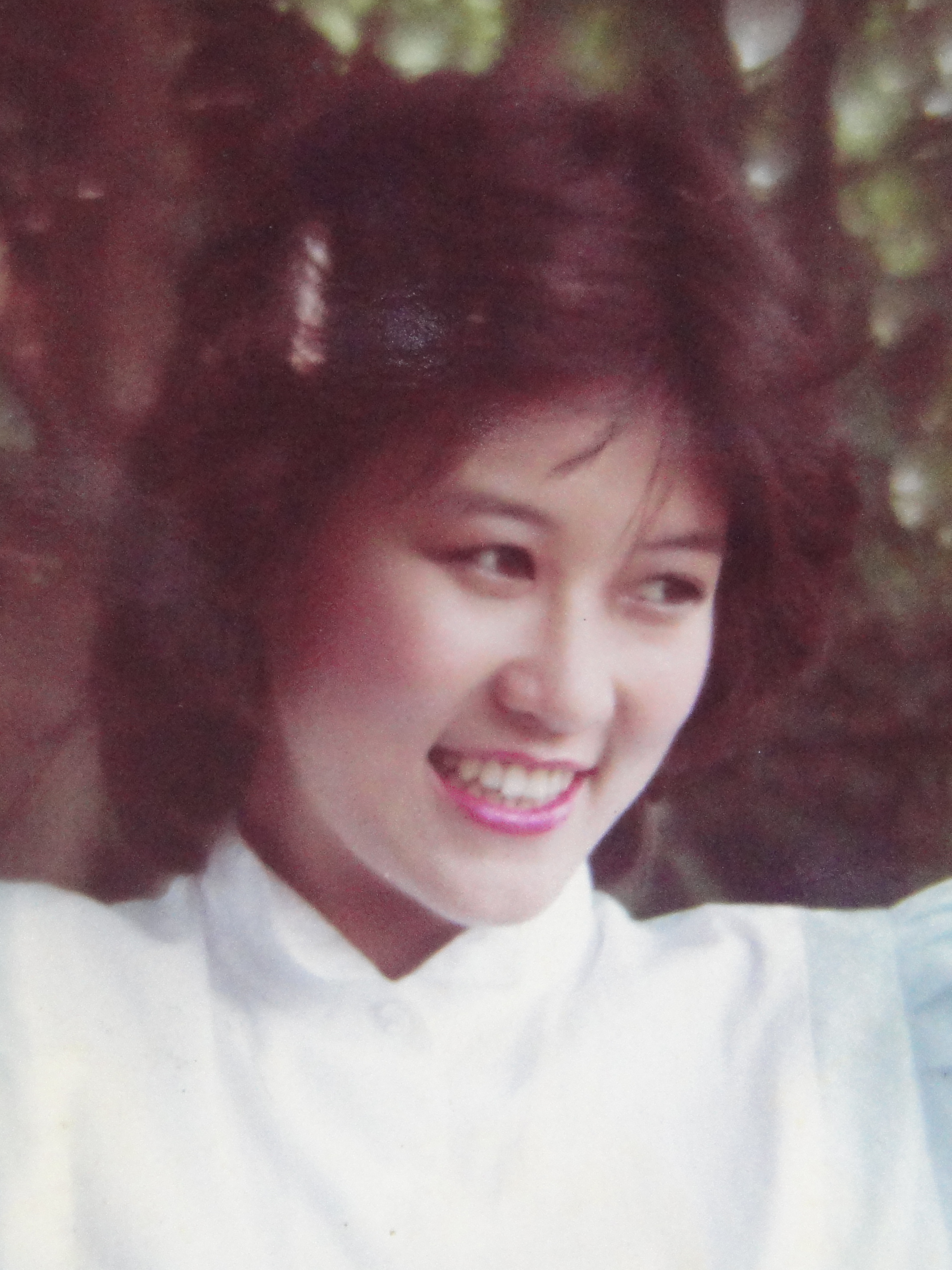
- Luo in 1982
- Born: Luo Pi-ling; 12 August 1960; Keelung, Taiwan
- Died: Bade Road, Taipei, Taiwan
- Body discovered: 3 August 2020 (aged 59)
- Resting place: Taoyuan, Taiwan
- Other names: Lo Pei-ying; Luo Biling
- Education: Christ's College Taipei
- Occupations: Television personality, actress, businesswoman
- Years active: 1980–2020
- Relatives: Luo Qing (brother)

Luo Pei-ying (Chinese: 羅霈穎; pinyin: Luó Pèiyǐng; 12 August 1960 – 3 August 2020), formerly known as Luo Pi-ling (罗璧玲; Luó Bìlíng), was a Taiwanese television personality, actress and businesswoman.

Luo was born on 12 August 1960 in Keelung. She began her career as an actress, appearing in a 1980 Chinese Television System drama. She later became known for her comedic and outspoken style on variety and talk shows, such as Kangsi Coming. Until 2005, Luo used the stage name Luo Pi-ling.

Luo was discovered dead at her home in Taipei on 3 August 2020, after friends were unable to contact her. Blood toxicology results determined her cause of death to be accidental overdose from heart and antidepressive medications, and has ruled out suicide.
