= Hsiao Sa =

Hsiao Sa (Xiao Sa) (Chinese: 蕭颯; pinyin: Xiāo Sà; Wade–Giles: Hsiao^{1} Sa^{4}; born March 4, 1953) is the pen name of Hsiao Ching-yu/Hsiao Ch’ing-yü (Chinese: 蕭慶餘), a Taiwanese educator and writer.

Hsiao Sa's family was from Nanjing and went to Taiwan where she was born. She studied at the Girl's Teacher Institute and then taught primary school in Taipei. Her first collection of stories was published when she was 17. Hsiao married director Chang Yi; the couple divorced in 1986.

Her 1981 book Xiafei zhi jia (A family from Xiafei) was made into a 1985 film Wo zhe yang guo le yi sheng (The life of Guimei). Her novella Wo er Hansheng was also made into a movie.

Her work has received a number of literary awards, as well as a Golden Horse Award for script writing.

== Selected works ==
- 《日光夜景》 (Night scenes in daylight), short stories (1977)
- 《小葉》 (1980)
- 《我兒漢生》 (My son Hansheng), novella (1981)
- 《少年阿辛》 (The youth Ahxin), novel (1984)
- 《返鄉劄記》 (Diaries of homecoming), novel (1987)
