= Jade Love (novella) =

Jade Love (玉卿嫂) is a 1960 Taiwanese novella by Pai Hsien-yung, first published in the magazine Xiandai wenxue (co-founded by Pai). Written in first person and told through the eyes of a 10-year-old boy, the story takes place in Guilin, China (the author's hometown) during the Second Sino-Japanese War.

== English translation ==
- Pai Hsien-yung (1962). "Jade Love". New Chinese Writing. The Heritage Press. pp. 1–63. (translated by Nancy Chang Ing)

== Adaptations ==
- Jade Love (film), a 1984 Taiwanese film starring Elsa Yang as Jade Love
- Jade Love (1997 TV series), a 1997 Taiwanese TV series starring Hsu Kuei-ying as Jade Love
- Jade Love (2006 TV series), a 2006 Chinese TV series starring Jiang Wenli as Jade Love
