= Loretta Yang =

Taiwanese actress and glass artist

Loretta H. Yang
- Born: Yang Hui Shan; 16 July 1952 (age 74); Taipei, Taiwan
- Education: University
- Occupations: Actress, Glass Artist
- Years active: 1975–1987
- Spouse: Chang Yi
- Awards: Asian Film Awards – Best Actress; 1984 Jade Love Golden Horse Awards – Best Actress; 1984 Teenage Fugitive; 1985 Kuei-Mei, A Woman

Chinese name
- Traditional Chinese: 楊惠姍
- Simplified Chinese: 杨惠姗
Transcriptions

Loretta Hui-shan Yang or Yang Hui-shan (Chinese: 楊惠姍) is a Taiwanese film actress and contemporary glass artist.

She is a two-time winner of the Best Leading Actress award at the Golden Horse Awards and winner of the Best Actress prize at the Asia-Pacific Film Festival.

She graduated from Taiwan Women Providence University.

== Personal life ==
Loretta Yang starred opposite Chang Yi in several movies in the 80s. Yang and Chang both left the film industry and restarted life in glass art.

== Film ==
=== Jade Love or Yuqing Sao (1984) ===
In Jade Love, Loretta Yang played the main protagonist. The movie is based on a novella with the same name written by Kenneth Pai Hsien-yung. The story revolves around a female domestic worker who falls in love with a younger man. The film was well-known for the love-making scenes between Loretta Yang and Chang Yi, who continue to work together after this initial appearance.

=== Kuei-Wei, a Woman or Wo Zheyang Guo Le Yisheng (1985) ===
The next film they worked on together – Kuei-Wei, a Woman – was a widespread success. The film won Loretta Yang Best Actress at the 1985 Golden Horse Awards and also took Best Film, Best Director and Best Adapted Screenplay. The adapted screenplay was written by Chang Yi| and his then wife, Hsiao Sa. The film depicts the transition of Taiwanese women as the society moved from an agricultural based society in the 1950s to an industrial society in the 1980s.

== Contemporary Glass Artist ==
"May the moment come when I attain enlightenment that my body, my soul, my spirit becomes like crystal. Pure. Transparent. Flawless."

In 1987 Yang left the film industry to create art. She, along with her husband, film director Chang Yi, and several other people from the film industry established the glass workshop and studio Liuli Gongfang near Taipei, Taiwan. The industrious group invested their resources in rehabilitating a dilapidated factory and learned the techniques and process of glass casting, pâte de verre in the French manner, similar to the luxury glass made by Lalique and Daum. Today, Liuli Gongfang owns factories on Taiwan (Tamshui) and in Shanghai, a museum/nightclub in Shanghai, and numerous galleries on Taiwan and in China, Hong Kong, and Singapore. The group decided to use the Chinese word liuli as opposed to more common names for glass in the Chinese language. It is commonly believed that the word liuli first appeared during the Western Zhou dynasty (about 1045–771 BCE), which referred to the glass being produced at the time. For Yang especially, using the term liuli, greatly references her own body of work which draws upon traditional Chinese motifs and such Buddhist teachings as enlightenment and transparency, evoking an almost meditative practice and devotional purpose. Yang's work has been exhibited both nationally and internationally and can be found in the collections of Palace Museum, Beijing, The Shanghai Fine Arts Museum, the Yakushaji Temple, Nara, Japan, the Victoria and Albert Museum, London, The National Museum of Women in the Arts, Washington, DC and The Corning Museum of Glass, Corning, NY.

=== Notable works ===
- The Proof of Awareness, 2007 The Corning Museum of Glass, Corning, NY
- Between heaven and Earth, 1998 Palace Museum, Beijing
- Life Eternal, 1998, Palace Museum, Beijing
- Releasing Light, 1998, Palace Museum, Beijing
- The Pumpkin Box, 1998, Victoria and Albert Museum, London
- Releasing Light, 1998, Victoria and Albert Museum, London
- A Great Wish, 1997, National Museum of Women in the Arts, Washington, DC
- Bowers Museum of Cultural Art. 2001. Formless, but not without form: Loretta Yang Hui-Shan. [Taipei, Taiwan]: Yang, Chang & Newworkshop Co.
- Brewerton, Andrew. 2010. "Glass Sutra: the Art of Loretta Yang Hui-Shan." Craft Arts International, no 78, 2010, pp. 18–24.

== Animation ==
In 2002, Loretta Yang and Chang Yi founded A-hha Studio. The studio worked on 2D and 3D animated shorts, features and games.

== See also ==
- Liuli Gongfang
