= Liuli Gongfang =

Glass studio in Taiwan

- Trade name: LIULI
- Native name: 琉璃工房
- Romanized name: Liúlí Gōngfáng
- Company type: Private
- Industry: Luxury Glass
- Founded: 1987
- Headquarters: Tamsui, New Taipei, Taiwan
- Products: Lead Crystal
- Number of employees: 900
- Website: www.liuliusa.com

Liuli Gongfang or Liuligongfang (Chinese: 琉璃工房; pinyin: Liúlí Gōngfáng) is Taiwan's only contemporary glass studio devoted to artistic Chinese glassware.

Liuligongfang was founded in 1987 by actress Loretta Yang and director Chang Yi. Their name refers to liuli, a form of archaic Chinese glasswork; the founders chose to use the word liuli, rather than the common name for glass, boli (玻璃) to honor their cultural origin. The founders aimed to revive the art of antique Chinese art glass, the production of which had dwindled following the First and Second Opium Wars in the 19th century. Yang mortgaged her house and those of all her family members in order to gain start-up capital. After much trial and error, costing $1 million and taking more than three years, she and Chang were able to master the French pate-de-verre or lost-wax casting method. At the time of their founding, they operated a two-person workshop in Tamsui, Taipei County (now New Taipei City). Yang and Chang originally had a fairly strict division of labour, with Yang handling the artistic aspects of their work, while Chang managed finances and other business responsibilities; with Chang's 1997 heart attack, Yang has taken over more of Chang's responsibilities as well, including contact with the media.

Works created by Liuli Gongfang have become part of the permanent collection of London's Victoria and Albert Museum as well as the Palace Museum in Beijing's Forbidden City. People First Party chairman James Soong, during his visit to mainland China (the second Taiwanese politician to do so, after that of Lien Chan), presented Communist Party General Secretary Hu Jintao with a Liuli Gongfang sculpture; Hu gave him Jingde porcelain in return.

== Collections around the world ==
Since its founding, LIULIGONGFANG has attracted collectors from diverse backgrounds around the world. Its works are held in private collections as well as corporate, cultural, and institutional collections, and have been acquired by public figures, business leaders, and heads of state.

In addition to being displayed in private homes and public venues, LIULIGONGFANG artworks have also been selected as diplomatic, commemorative, and ceremonial gifts, including gifts exchanged among members of royal families and international dignitaries. https://www.businessweekly.com.tw/careers/indep/1005750 CEO Note: SeaChange Summer Party a Huge Success for the Oceans | Oceana

Liuligongfang art works have been exhibited in Taiwan, Japan, Mainland China, Europe, and United States. Several pieces have become part of the permanent collection of some of the most well known museums. Including The Palace Museum, Beijing, Shanghai Fine Arts Museum, Tsui Museum of Art, HongKong, Medicine Buddha Temple in Nara, Japan, The National Museum of Women in the Arts in Washington D.C., United States, Victoria and Albert Museum in United Kingdom, Bowers Museum in California, United States.

== See also ==
- List of companies of Taiwan
