= Kuei-Mei, a Woman =

1985 film

- Film poster
- Directed by: Chang Yi
- Written by: Chang Yi
- Produced by: Hui San-Chi
- Starring: Hui San Yang; Lichun Lee
- Cinematography: Yang Wei-han
- Edited by: Wang Chin-Chen
- Music by: Chang Hung-Yi
- Production company: Central Motion Picture Corporation
- Release date: 9 October 1985
- Running time: 152 minutes
- Country: Taiwan
- Language: Mandarin

Kuei-Mei, a Woman (Chinese: 我這樣過了一生) is a 1985 Taiwanese drama film directed by Chang Yi. The film was selected as the Taiwanese entry for the Best Foreign Language Film at the 58th Academy Awards, but was not accepted as a nominee. It won the Golden Horse Award for Best Feature Film in 1985.

== Cast ==
- Hui San Yang as Kuei-Mei
- Lichun Lee as Kuei-Mei's husband

== See also ==
- List of submissions to the 55th Academy Awards for Best Foreign Language Film
- List of Taiwanese submissions for the Academy Award for Best Foreign Language Film
