= Jade Love (film) =

- Film poster
- Chinese: 玉卿嫂
- Literal meaning: Aunt Yuqing
- Hanyu Pinyin: Yùqīng Sǎo
- Directed by: Chang Yi
- Written by: Chang Yi
- Based on: Jade Love by Pai Hsien-yung
- Produced by: Li Hsing
- Starring: Elsa Yang; Lin Ding-feng; Juan Sheng-tien; Fu Chuen
- Cinematography: An Hao-kuo
- Music by: Chang Hung-yi
- Production company: New City International Film
- Release date: 1984
- Running time: 105 minutes
- Country: Taiwan
- Language: Mandarin

Jade Love, aka Madam Yu Ching (Chinese: 玉卿嫂), is a 1984 Taiwanese film directed and written by Chang Yi, based on Pai Hsien-yung's 1960 novella of the same name and starring Yang Hui-Shan. The novella on which it was based was published in Modern Literature (Chinese: 現代文學) magazine in 1960. It is a tragic story set in Guilin, Province of Guangxi, in China, during the Second Sino-Japanese War, about a young widow’s pursuit of her desire.

Censors from the Government Information Office removed four minutes (including an explicit sex scene) from the film. The uncensored version was not released until 2012.

== Plot ==
The film is set during the Second Sino-Japanese war. The entire story is told from the perspective of Rong ge (Chinese: 容哥), a ten-year-old boy of a wealthy family in Guilin, Province of Guangxi, in China. He meets his nanny Madam Yu Ching (Chinese: 玉卿嫂), who is a beautiful widow in her early thirties. Rong ge likes Madam Yu Ching and becomes dependent to her, who is tender and caring towards him. Madam Yu Ching disregards the attentions from men and the marriage proposal from the family where she works, leading to the rumors about her keeping a secret lover.

Curious, Rong ge follows Madam Yu Ching when she leaves Rong ge’s family house. He discovers that she keeps a young lover, Ching-Sheng (Chinese: 慶生), in a small hut outside the village. Madam Yu Ching tells Rong ge that Ching-Sheng, who is too fragile to work due to pulmonary disease, is her sworn brother. She says that Rong ge can come again if he promises not to tell anyone about Ching-Sheng. Rong ge is fond of Ching-Sheng and promises to keep the secret. Next day, Rong ge takes Ching-Sheng to see the traditional Chinese opera and hang out with the troupe. Ching-Sheng is attracted by the leading actress of the troupe, Jin Fei Yan. Rong ge even introduces Ching-Sheng to play erhu for the troupe. After they return to the hut, Rong ge tells Madam Yu Ching about their day at the troupe, which enrages Madam Yu Ching. Madam Yu Ching says that the troupe is not a good place and Rong ge should not take him there ever again.

Rong ge feels that Madam Yu Ching, who forbids Ching-Sheng from leaving the hut, has a strange obsession towards Ching-Sheng. Accidentally, he sees Madam Yu Ching having sex with Ching-Sheng and is shocked by the scene. One day, Rong ge finds Ching-Sheng having an affair with the leading actress in the troupe, Jin Fei Yan, and tells Madam Yu Ching about it. Madam Yu Ching falls apart when she arrives at the troupe and sees Ching-Sheng and Jin Fei Yan together.

On the night of the Lantern Festival, Madam Yu Ching takes Rong ge to visit Ching-Sheng. Ching-Sheng wants to join the crowds on the streets, but Madam Yu Ching forbids him from going out. Ching-Sheng insists on leaving, saying that he is only twenty years old and asks Madam Yu Ching to leave him alone from now on.

A few days later, Madam Yu Ching tells Rong ge that she has some business to take care of and leaves the family house. Early morning, Rong ge finds the Madam Yu Ching still has not come back, so he goes to the secret hut, only to see that Ching-Sheng lying in blood. Madam Yu Ching, who is next to Ching-Sheng, is holding a knife and stabs herself as she sees Rong ge. She falls onto Ching-Sheng’s body and holds him as she dies.

== Cast ==
Yang Hui-Shan (Chinese: 楊惠姍) as Madam Yu Ching （Chinese: 玉卿嫂）

Lin Ding-Feng (Chinese: 林鼎峰)as Rong ge（Chinese: 容哥）

Ruan Sheng-Tian （Chinese:阮勝田） as Ching-Sheng (Chinese: 慶生)

Liu Yin-Shan（Chinese: 劉引商） as Pang daniang (Chinese: 胖大娘)

Fu Chuan (Chinese: 傅娟) as Jin Fei Yan(Chinese: 金飛燕)

== Production ==
The adaptation of Pai Hsien-Yung’s novella, Jade Love, was a project of Li Hsing (Chinese: 李行), produced by his film company, Tian Xia Film Company (Chinese: 天下電影公司). It was originally set to be directed by Fred Tan (Chinese: 但漢章), but it did not go well. Eventually, producer Li Hsing invited Chang Yi, who was one of the Taiwan New Cinema directors, to direct the film. Although the story of Madam Yu Ching was set in Guilin, China in the 1940s, the film was shot in Taiwan.

The lead actor, Yang Hui-Shan, was not Chang Yi’s first choice as Madam Yu Ching because Yang Hui-Shan was known for her sexualized image in many Taiwan exploitation films. Later, Yang Hui-Shan’s dedication to her role won her recognition.

== Reception and controversy ==
The sex scene in the film, which showed Madam Yu Ching raising her legs across Ching-Sheng’s shoulders, was deleted out by the censorship board of the Government Information Office. The reason for the deletion was that the scene would “damage the good image of Chinese women (有礙中國婦女良好形象).” According to Chang Yi, the deleted scene was almost six minutes in total. Because of the controversial around the sex scene in the film, Jade Love failed to win any award at the Golden Horse Award. Yang Hui-Shan did not receive the nomination of the Best Actress Award for her performance in Jade Love, but she was nominated and won the Best Actress Award for her role in Teenage Fugitive (1984).

According to film scholar Shen Shiao-Ying (Chinese: 沈曉茵), the reason why the film arouses controversies and fear in the government officials is that the character, Madam Yu Ching, is a woman who actively pursuits her desires and passion, rather than a sex object to be looked at.

In 2012, the complete, un-edited version of Jade Love was screened at Taipei Film Festival for the first time in Taiwan.

== Awards and nominations ==
Award	Category	Individual	Result
21st Golden Horse Awards	Best Original Film Score	Chang Hung-yi	Won
21st Golden Horse Awards	Best Child Star	Lin Ding-feng	Won
21st Golden Horse Awards	Best Sound Recording	Wang Yung-fang	Won
21st Golden Horse Awards	Best Feature Film		Nominated
21st Golden Horse Awards	Best Director	Chang Yi	Nominated
21st Golden Horse Awards	Best Adapted Screenplay	Chang Yi	Nominated
21st Golden Horse Awards	Best Art Direction	Chou Chih-liang, Wang Hsia-chun	Nominated
29th Asia-Pacific Film Festival	Best Music	Chang Hung-Yi	won
	Best Actress		won

Award	Category	Name	Result
21st Golden Horse Award	Best Original Score	Chang Hung-yi (Chinese: 張弘毅)	Won
	Best Child Star	Lin Ding-Feng	Won
	Best Sound Recording	Wang Rong-Fang 王榮芳	Won
	Best Feature Film		nominated
	Best Director	Chang Yi	nominated
	Best Adapted Screenplay	Chang Yi	nominated
	Best Art Direction	Wang Xia-Jun (Chinese: 王俠軍) Zou Zhi-Liang (Chinese: 鄒志良)	nominated
29th Asia-Pacific Film Festival	Best Music	Chang Hung-Yi	won
	Best Actress		won
