= Chang Yi (director) =

Taiwanese director (1951–2020)

Chang Yi 張毅
- Born: December 14, 1951; Taipei, Taiwan
- Died: November 1, 2020 (aged 68)
- Occupation(s): film director, screenwriter
- Years active: 1980-1986
- Notable work: Jade Love (1984), Kuei-Mei, a Woman (1985)
- Spouse(s): Hsiao Sa (divorce); Loretta Yang
- Awards: Asia Pacific Film Festival – Best Director; 1985 Kuei-Mei, a Woman Golden Horse Awards – Best Screenwriter; 1980 The Pioneers Golden Horse Awards – Best Director; 1985 Kuei-Mei, a Woman

Chang Yi (張毅; 14 December 1951 – 1 November 2020) was a Taiwanese film director.

== Career ==
Chang was born in Taipei and studied film at Shih Hsin University. He is listed in the New Taiwan Cinema directors. He won the Golden Horse Award for Best Director and Asia Pacific Film Festival because of 1985 film Kuei-Mei, a Woman (Chinese: 我這樣過了一生). He had an extramarital affair with Loretta Yang, the leading actress in many of Chang's movies. After the affair was exposed by Hsiao Sa, Chang Yi and Loretta Yang left Taiwan film industry and became the founders of contemporary glass studio Liuli Gongfang.

Chang Yi died on November 1, 2020. Lorretta Yang acknowledged that Chang had health issues from 2018, particularly with his immune system and kidneys, and that Chang had sought medical treatment in hospital since February 2020.

== Filmography ==
=== Screenwriter ===
- 1980 : The Pioneers (源)
- 1981 : Re Xue (熱血)
- 1982 : Steamrolling (人肉戰車)
- 1982 : Bird's Fly (野雀高飛)
- 1982 : In Our Time (光陰的故事) part 4
- 1983 : Kendo Kids (竹劍少年)
- 1983 : The Great Surprise (一九八三大驚奇)
- 1983 : (魔輪)
- 1984 : Jade Love (玉卿嫂)
- 1985 : Kuei-Mei, a Woman (我這樣過了一生)
- 1986 : My son Hansheng (我兒漢生)
- 1986 : This Love of Mine (我的愛)
- 1987 : The Sea Plan (大海計劃)

=== Director ===
- 1982 : Bird's Fly (野雀高飛)
- 1982 : In Our Time (光陰的故事) part 4
- 1983 : Kendo Kids (竹劍少年)
- 1984 : Jade Love (玉卿嫂)
- 1985 : Kuei-Mei, a Woman (我這樣過了一生)
- 1986 : My son Hansheng (我兒漢生)
- 1986 : This Love of Mine (我的愛)
- 2005 : Black Bum (黑屁股, Animation)
- 2018 : A Dog’s Life (狗狗傷心誌, Animation)
