= Nong Ben Duo Qing =

Nong Ben Duo Qing may refer to:

- Love Is Payable, a 1997 Taiwanese-Chinese TV series
- Entangling Love in Shanghai, a 2010 remake
