= The Fourth Portrait =

- Film poster
- Directed by: Chung Mong-hong
- Screenplay by: Chung Mong-hong; Tu Hsiang-Wen
- Story by: Chung Mong-hong
- Produced by: Tseng Shao-Chien
- Starring: Bi Xiao-Hai; Chin Shih-Chieh; Hao Lei; Leon Dai; Nadow Lin; Terri Kwan
- Cinematography: Nakashima Nagao aka Chung Mong-hong
- Edited by: Luo Shijing
- Music by: Xu Qianxiu
- Production companies: 3 NG Film; Cream Production
- Release date: October 22, 2010 (Taiwan)
- Running time: 105 minutes
- Country: Taiwan
- Languages: Taiwanese Mandarin; Taiwanese Hokkien

The Fourth Portrait (Chinese: 第四張畫), released in 2010, is Taiwanese director Chung Mong-hong's second feature film, following his critically acclaimed Parking (2008). The screenplay was co-written by Chung Mong-hong himself and Tu Hsiang-wen. With its narrative revolving around the child protagonist, Xiao Xiang, portrayed by the then eleven-year-old actor Bi Xiao-Hai, the film draws inspiration from Chung's documentary film The Doctor from 2006. Specifically, the young boy, Wan Yu-Ho (aka Felix) depicted in The Doctor, tragically ended his life in his closet at a young age. Alongside Bi Xiao-Hai, whose cinematic debut won him the Best Actor Award at the Taipei Film Awards, The Fourth Portrait stars an impressively strong cast, including Chin Shih-Chieh, Hao Lei, Leon Dai, Nadow Lin, and Terri Kwan. Garnering much praise when it was screened at the Taipei Film Festival, The Fourth Portrait went on to receive seven major awards nominations at the Golden Horse Film Festival and Awards.

While Chung Mong-hong drew from his documentary film, The Doctor, to set the theme of The Fourth Portrait, the approach of organizing the narrative with four portraits sketched by Xiao Xiang originated from news coverage about child abuse resulting in death, as well as the experience of Chung searching for hand-drawn doodles by Wan Yu-Ho that could represent the deceased young boy's state of mind when he shot the documentary film, The Doctor. "Chung pays careful attention to lighting and colors, with cold blue grays offset by occasional saturated richness. Landscapes, and especially magical skies, reveal a painter’s palette of tones and provide an uplift when fate appears less generous." As Chung Mong-hong meticulously incorporated and adapted the existing artwork into The Doctor and later transformed the same storytelling technique into The Forth Portrait, Chung's genuine and heartfelt approach toward Taiwanese society and his attentive observation of essential human compassion is revealed through the outstanding cinematography and the mastery of visual storytelling.

== Plot ==
Xiao Xiang is ten years old this year. His father, who Xiao Xiang relies on for everything, passes away at home due to illness. With no means to sustain himself, Xiao Xiang, after stealing a lunchbox at school, befriends a rough-looking but kind-hearted janitor, played by Chin Shih-Chieh, at school. As the two of them salvage old items together, Xiao Xiang believes he has found a new place that he can call home. However, Xiao Xiang's long-lost mother, played by Hao Lei, suddenly appears and takes him to a new family.

With the arrival of Xiao Xiang's birth mother and his stepfather, played by Leon Dai, we discover that Xiao Xiang not only experiences the loss of his birth father but also has a complex family background. Relocating to the home of his birth mother and stepfather that never belonged to him, Xiao Xiang not only feels unfamiliar with his mother but also faces disapproval from his stepfather, who can not stand him in any way. Facing his brooding stepfather, Xiao Xiang becomes confused and lost. Fortunately, he meets "Gun Boy" by chance and they begin wandering and stealing together.

Xiao Xiang always remembers that he has an older brother who left with his birth mother when he was young. While knowing nothing about his brother's whereabouts, Xiao Xiang dreams repeatedly about his brother wandering alone on the beach. Seeing Xiao Xiang's drawing that depicts a fragile body walking on the river bank, Xiao Xiang's art teacher confronts Xiao Xiang's mother about the brother's absence in Xiao Xiang's school records, only to learn about his brother's mysterious disappearance. As the truth slowly unfolds, the police also get involved in the investigation, putting strain on Xiao Xiang's already tense relationship with his stepfather. It is only through a significant monologue by the stepfather, that the entire event unfolds, revealing the truth behind the disappearance of Xiao Xiang's brother and the intricacies of the case.

== Xiao Xiang's Four Portraits ==
=== The First Portrait ===
Ten-year-old Xiao Xiang's father died at the beginning of the film. Unable to fulfill his father's final wish, Xiao Xiang creates his first portrait: a pencil drawing of his father, which replaces his father's photograph at the funeral. Representing both the presence and absence of Xiao Xiang's father, the father's face in the drawing appears emotionless and eerie, leaving little trace for the audience to learn about Xiao Xiang's true feelings toward his father's death.

=== The Second Portrait ===
The second portrait is the genitalia of the delinquent character Gun Boy, played by Nadow, whom Xiao Xiang meets in the public restroom by chance. This portrait is an assignment for an art class. Xiao Xiang's teacher asks the class to depict their best friends. The second painting, showing a cropped view of Gun Boy's body, likely inspired by their chance encounter in the restroom, represents Xiao Xiang's limited and naive understanding of friendship. This portrait also delves into the concept of friendship from a child's perspective, which often differs from societal expectations.

=== The Third Portrait ===
The third portrait depicts Xiao Xiang's recurring dream of his brother wandering alone on the beach. Xiao Xiang's brother was taken away when their mother remarried, and it is only after Xiao Xiang moves in with his mother and his stepfather after his birth father's death that he discovers his brother has gone missing. Behind this portrait lies a shocking secret. The third painting exposes the cruelest part of Xiao Xiang's childhood: the unwilling separation between the two brothers and the brother's permanent disappearance, and represents the loss Xiao Xiang has experienced, including the separation from his brother, his birth mother, his birth father, and himself.

=== The Fourth Portrait ===
The fourth painting is a self-portrait of Xiao Xiang himself, depicting Xiao Xiang's own face. Xiao Xiang's face looks squarely at the viewer. While looking confused and hurt, it lacks tears or signs of emotion. Like the other three portraits, this fourth portrait, even though portraying Xiao Xiang's face fully on paper, offers limited view for the audience to interpret Xiao Xiang's state of mind or to find an expression that would evoke sympathy.

== Cast ==
- Xiao Xiang, played by Bi Xiao-Hai: a ten-year-old school boy who goes through different passages of separation and loss.
- School janitor, played by Chin Shih-Chieh
- Xiao Xiang's long-lost birth mother, played by Hao Lei: a destitute bride from China, Xiao Xiang's mother works at a KTV at night to make a living.
- Xiao Xiang's stepfather, played by Leon Dai: A man of rough temper and dark secrets, Xiao Xiang's stepfather owns a goldfish stall in the night market.
- "Gun Boy," played by Nadow Lin
- Xiao Xiang's teacher, played by Terri Kwan
- Police officer, played by Vincent Liang
- Funeral Musician, "Fat Uncle," played by Lo Pei-An
- Boss Li, played by Chen Hsi-Sheng
- Temple janitor, played by Bai Yun "White Cloud"
- Xiao Xiang's father, played by Chen Tien-Te
- Xiao Xiang's older brother, played by Shih Heng-Li and Lin Sheng-Hsiang
- Doctor, played by Liu Chen-Hsiung
- Nurse, played by Cheng I-Pin
- Funeral Directors, played by Chen Chia-Kuei and Chen Tsung-Chin
- Emcee, played by Li Mu-Hsing
- Funeral musicians, played by Jih Hsin Band
- Xiao Xiang's classmate, played by Chiang Chih-Yuan
- Xiao Xiang's younger brother, played by Chen Kuan-Chia
- Younger brother of "Gun Boy," played by Lin Li-Hsiang
- The tall, skinny man at the showroom, played by Chang Shih-Hui
- KTV Bouncer, played by Chung Mong-hong
- KTV Attendant, played by Cheng I-Hsiang

Characters are listed in the order of appearance.

== Awards ==
Award	Category	Awardee	Result
The 47th Golden Horse Film Festival and Awards	Best Narrative Feature		Nominated
The 47th Golden Horse Film Festival and Awards	Best Director	Chung Mong-hong	Won
The 47th Golden Horse Film Festival and Awards	Best Supporting Actress	Hao Lei	Won
The 47th Golden Horse Film Festival and Awards	Best New Performer	Bi Xiao-Hai	Nominated
The 47th Golden Horse Film Festival and Awards	Best Original Screenplay	Chung Mong-hong and Tu Hsiang-Wen	Nominated
The 47th Golden Horse Film Festival and Awards	Best Cinematography	Nakashima Nagao	Nominated
The 47th Golden Horse Film Festival and Awards	Outstanding Taiwanese Filmmaker of the Year		Won
The 47th Golden Horse Film Festival and Awards	FIPRESCI Prize		Won
The 11th Chinese Film Media Awards	Most Popular Film		Nominated
The 12th Taipei Film Awards	Best Narrative Feature		Won
The 12th Taipei Film Awards	Best Actor	Bi Xiao-Hai	Won
The 12th Taipei Film Awards	Audience's Choice Award		Won
