= The Smiling, Proud Wanderer (disambiguation) =

The Smiling, Proud Wanderer is a novel by Jin Yong.

The Smiling, Proud Wanderer may also refer to:

- The Smiling, Proud Wanderer (1984 TV series), a 1984 Hong Kong television series
- Swordsman (TV series), Chinese television series

== See also ==
- State of Divinity (disambiguation)
