= Secret Love for the Peach Blossom Spring (film) =

1992 film

- Film poster
- Directed by: Stan Lai
- Written by: Stan Lai
- Produced by: Ting Nai-chu; Wang Ying-hsiang
- Starring: Brigitte Lin
- Cinematography: Christopher Doyle
- Edited by: Chen Po-wen
- Music by: Fumio Itabashi; Kazutoki Umezu
- Production companies: Long Shong Pictures; Performance Workshop Films
- Release date: 10 September 1992 (Taiwan)
- Running time: 107 minutes
- Country: Taiwan
- Language: Mandarin

Secret Love for the Peach Blossom Spring (Chinese: 暗戀桃花源) is a 1992 Taiwanese comedy film written and directed by Stan Lai based on the play Secret Love in Peach Blossom Land. The film was selected as the Taiwanese entry for the Best Foreign Language Film at the 65th Academy Awards, but was not accepted as a nominee.

== Cast ==
- Brigitte Lin as Yun Zhifan
- Wei-Hui Li as Mysterious woman
- Ku Pao-ming as Master Yuen (as Paoming Ku)
- Li Li-chun as Old Tao (as Lichun Lee)
- Chin Shih-chieh as Chiang Pin-Liu (as Shi-Jye Jin)
- Ismene Ting as Spring Flower
- Shih-Chieh King as Chiang Pin-Liu
- Pao-Ming Ku as Master Yuen
- Li-Chun Lee as Old Tao
- Lih-Ching Lin as Mrs. Chiang
- Li-Mei Chen as Nurse
- Lung-Chieh Chen as Flyman
- Chung Ding as Ding Chung
- Xiaofei Guo as
- Ching-Ming Hsu as Make-up artist
- Han-Chang Hu as Mr. Wang
- Wei-Hui Li as Lost woman (as Li Wei-hui)
- Ju-Ping Lin as Assistant
- Li-Chin Lin as Scenic Painter

== See also ==
- List of submissions to the 65th Academy Awards for Best Foreign Language Film
- List of Taiwanese submissions for the Academy Award for Best Foreign Language Film
