= Chin Shih-chieh =

Taiwanese actor

- 金士傑
- Born: 29 December 1951 (age 74); Pingtung County, Taiwan, Republic of China
- Education: National Pingtung University of Science and Technology (BS)
- Occupation: Actor
- Years active: 1978–present

Chinese name
- Simplified Chinese: 金士杰
- Traditional Chinese: 金士傑
Transcriptions
Standard Mandarin
- Hanyu Pinyin: Jīn Shìjié
Southern Min
- Hokkien POJ: Kim Sū-kia̍t

Chin Shih-chieh (Chinese: 金士傑; Pe̍h-ōe-jī: Kim Sū-kia̍t; born 29 December 1951) is a Taiwanese actor, director and playwright.

== Biography ==
Chin was born in Pingtung County, Taiwan, on 29 December 1951, while his ancestral home in Hefei, Anhui. He graduated from the National Pingtung University of Science and Technology.

== Career ==
Chin is known for his work with the Performance Workshop, the Lanling Theatre, and the Godot Theater Company. By 1980, he was known as a director, leading the performances of Ho Chu’s New Match for Lanling. He directed the 2002 production of She is Walking, She is Smiling staged at the National Theatre in Taipei, by the Performance Workshop. He was cast in Art, a Gadot production, the next year alongside Ku Pao-ming and Lee Li-chun. Chin was cast in Irma la Douce in 2007, and performed several times at Sun Yat-sen Memorial Hall, the National Theatre, and the Hsinchu Performing Arts Auditorium. In 2008, Chin starred in Othello alongside Lee. Performances were held throughout Taiwan, marking Godot's twentieth anniversary. As Othello's run stretched into January 2009, Chin remained on the cast. Chin directed Ho Chu’s New Match a second time in May 2009. In July 2009, Chin shared the National Award for Arts with Wang Da-hong and four others. In 2010, Chin appeared in The 39 Steps for Godot. This was the first production to be licensed in Chinese while still on an original run in New York and London. The next year, Chin took the stage in Tuesdays with Morrie, based on a memoir of the same name. The performance ran in Taipei and Taichung through March 2012. In 2013, Chin joined the cast of Stan Lai's A Dream Like A Dream.

Chin film roles include Cho Li's directorial debut, Zoom Hunting (2010), and Lin Fu-ching's first film Jumping Boy (2012). Chin has often worked with director Chung Mong-hong, appearing in The Fourth Portrait (2010), and Soul (2013). Chin narrated the 2015 documentary The Rocking Sky, and portrayed a business tycoon in Love in Vain (2016).

== Selected filmography ==
- Wo ta lang er lai (1978)
- Liu chao guai tan (1979)
- Ho Chu's New Match (1980, 2009)
- You wo wu di (1980)
- Xin hai shuang shi (1981)
- Terrorizers (1986) - Zhou's lover
- Soursweet (1988) - Night Brother
- A Brighter Summer Day (1991) - Ming's 7th Uncle
- Qi wang (1991) - Lanky Ngai
- Secret Love for the Peach Blossom Spring (1993) - Chiang Pin-Liu
- The Great Conqueror's Concubine (1994)
- Tian Di (1994) - Shantung Cat
- Island of Greed (1997) - Fai's Supervisor
- The Personals (1998)
- Guo jong (1999) - Mr. Liu
- Born to Be King (2000)
- She is Walking, She is Smiling (2002)
- Art (2003)
- The Rise of the Tang Empire (2006, TV Series) - Wei Zheng
- Irma La Douce (2007)
- Ting che (2008)
- Dou cha (2008)
- Othello (2008–2009, TV Series)
- Black & White (2009, TV Series)
- Empire of Silver (2009) - Manager Liu
- Tai bei piao xue (2009) - Master Ma
- Zoom Hunting (2010) - Doorman
- The Fourth Portrait (2010) - Chang
- Reign of Assassins (2010) - Doctor Li
- 17th Exit (公視人生劇展—十七號出入口) (2010) - Yuesheng Du
- Mang ren dian ying yuan (2010)
- The 39 Steps (2010) - Grandfather
- The Invaluable Treasure 1949 (2011, TV Series) - Yang Lei
- In Time with You (2011, TV Series) - Uncle Pai
- Tuesdays with Morrie (2011-2012, TV Series)
- Jumping Boy (2012) - Tian Bian
- The Guillotines (2012) - Wan Jiang
- A Dream Like A Dream (2013)
- The Grandmaster (2013)
- Soul (2013) - Messenger
- Rock N' Road (2014, TV Series) - Ko Chung-Ming
- Brotherhood of Blades (2014) - Wei Zhongxian
- Black & White Episode I: The Dawn of Assault (2014) - Shih Yung-Kuang
- Mr. Right Wanted (2015, TV Series) - Yu Wen
- Double Date (2015)
- Du yi wu er (2015)
- The Last Women Standing (2015) - Sheng's Father
- The Final Master (2015) - Zheng Shan'ao - The Grandmaster
- Detective Chinatown (2015) - Mr. Yan
- The Rocking Sky (2015, Documentary) - Narrator (voice)
- E ling zhi men (2016)
- Big Fish & Begonia (2016) - Ling Po (voice)
- Godspeed (2016) - Nadow's Father
- See You Tomorrow (2016) - God of Bing
- Ni hao, feng zi! (2016) - Nai'en Xiao
- The Apparition (2016)
- Love in Vain (2016)
- Provoking Laughter (2016)
- The Rise of a Tomboy (2016)
- Duckweed (2017) - Police director
- Once Upon a Time in the Northeast (2017) - Jiang Dong
- Surgeons (2017, TV Series) - Xiu Minqi
- Brotherhood of Blades II: The Infernal Battlefield (2017) - Wei Zhongxian
- Reset (2017) - Director
- Princess Agents (2017, TV Series) - Yuwen Xi
- Da Hu Fa (2017) - Ji'an
- Le portrait interdit (2017) - General Intendent Chen
- Inference Notes (2017) - Zhou
- Midnight Diner (2017, TV Series)
- Hua jia da ren zhuan nan hai (2018) - Mr. Fang
- The Way of the Bug (2018) - Uncle Da
- Great Expectations (2018, TV Series) - Huang Shang
- Ren jian, xi ju (2019) - Yang Taijun
- A Live Kidnap Show (2019)
- Wo de qing chun dou shi ni (2019) - Professor Wang
- Qi Huan Zhi Lv (2019)
- San Cha Ji (2020)
- Winter Begonia (2020)
- A Place Called Silence (2024) - Fang Juezhong
