= State of Divinity =

State of Divinity may refer to:

- State of Divinity (1996 TV series), a 1996 Hong Kong television series
- State of Divinity (2000 TV series), a 2000 Taiwanese television series
- The Smiling, Proud Wanderer or State of Divinity, a novel by Jin Yong
