= Soul (2013 film) =

2013 film

- Theatrical release poster
- Directed by: Chung Mong-hong
- Written by: Chung Mong-hong
- Produced by: Tseng Shao-chien; Yeh Ju-feng
- Starring: Joseph Chang; Jimmy Wang
- Cinematography: Nagao Nakashima
- Edited by: Lo Shih-ching
- Music by: Tseng Seu-ming
- Distributed by: Ifilm
- Release date: 30 August 2013 (Taiwan)
- Running time: 111 minutes
- Country: Taiwan
- Language: Mandarin

Soul (Chinese: 失魂; pinyin: Shī hún) is a 2013 Taiwanese horror film written and directed by Chung Mong-hong. The film was selected as the Taiwanese entry for the Best Foreign Language Film at the 86th Academy Awards, but it was not nominated. The film was screened in the Vanguard section of the 2013 Toronto International Film Festival.

== Plot ==
A young man, ah-Chuan, falls unconscious at work. At his bedside, a boy offers him his room in a few days, as he (the boy) will be leaving.

Ah-Chuan is sent to stay with his father, Mr. Wang, in the mountains. Ah-Chuan's older sister comes by, but is disturbed by his behaviour upon waking. Ah-Chuan kills her.

When confronted by Mr. Wang, Ah-Chuan says he entered the body because the real ah-Chuan left it, but will return shortly. Mr. Wang hides his daughter's body, kills his son-in-law when he arrives, and buries the son-in-law's car. He confines ah-Chuan to a shed. A messenger appears and tells ah-Chuan that the real ah-Chuan won't be back for a while.

At the clinic, Mr. Wang reveals that his late wife killed herself due to depression. Later, he uncovers an old well and persuades ah-Chuan to jump in. Ah-Chuan jumps in and sees visions of ah-Chuan and his mother, then awakens in the house. Mr. Wang reveals that his wife didn't kill herself, but asked him for a mercy killing in the shed.

A city cop arrives to investigate the disappearance of Mr. Wang's daughter and son-in-law. Ah-Chuan kills the city cop.

Ah-Chuan's police friend, Wu, checks on Ah-Chuan, who injures him in the eye, pursues him through the woods, then saves him from drowning. As ah-Chuan walks away, Wu shoots him in the back.

Mr. Wang takes them down the mountain while concocting a different version of events - taking all blame for the murders - for Wu to use.

One year later, ah-Chuan works in the mountains and Mr. Wang has been transferred to a sanitorium due to poor health. Ah-Chuan visits and tells him about the first time he met the real ah-Chuan (in spirit form), who said he was going home.

== Cast ==
- Joseph Chang as Ah-Chuan
- Jimmy Wang as Wang
- Chen Shiang-chyi as Yun
- Leon Dai as Son-in-law
- Jag Huang as Ah-Chuan's Workmate
- Chen Yu-hsun as Doctor Wu
- Chin Shih-chieh as Messenger
- Wu Pong-fong
- Tou Chung-hua

== See also ==
- List of submissions to the 86th Academy Awards for Best Foreign Language Film
- List of Taiwanese submissions for the Academy Award for Best Foreign Language Film
