= Sun Xing =

Hong Kong singer and actor (born 1963)

- Born: Guangzhou, Guangdong, China
- Occupations: Actor; singer
- Years active: 1987–present
- Musical career
- Also known as: Suen Hing, Sun Hsing, Coco Sun
- Origin: Hong Kong
- Genres: Mandopop

Sun Xing is a Hong Kong actor and singer born in Guangzhou, China. He became well-known across Taiwan, Hong Kong, and mainland China with his role in the 1991 fantasy romantic comedy My Fairy Wife. Later he portrayed heroes in a number of Taiwanese wuxia TV dramas, including The Heaven Sword and Dragon Saber (1994). His other significant roles in the 1990s including The Seven Heroes and Five Gallants (1994) and The Return of the Condor Heroes (1998). During the 2000s, he mostly appeared in comedies. The 2000 romantic fantasy comedy-drama Sunny Piggy is considered one of his most beloved roles, with ratings over 30% in several provinces. State of Divinity (2000) and Aliens at Home (2009) are among his biggest TV series in the 2000s.

== Biography ==
Sun Xing was born in China, grew up in Beijing and immigrated to Hong Kong with his parents as a teenager. He started his acting career in Hong Kong, and moved to Taiwan in the 1990s where he appeared on popular TV series.

== Selected filmography ==
=== Films ===
Year	English title	Chinese title	Role	Notes
1988	Devil's Curse	猛鬼咒		
1990	Chicken à la Queen	快樂的小雞		
1990	The Dragon from Russia	紅場飛龍		
1991	Lover at Large	難得有情郎		
1992	Laser Drama: Action in Space	航天行動		
1993	Her Judgement Day	剃刀情人		
1994	Urban Cop	特警神龍		
1994	The Lovers	梁祝	Ruoxu	
1996	Hong Kong Show Girl	癲馬女郎之一夜情		
1998	My Wife, My Boss	给太太打工	Su Yang	
2003	Double Dating	非常浪漫	Jiahui	
2009	The Founding of a Republic	建國大業	Du Yuming	
2010	The Swordsman Dream	嘻遊記		
2010	Don Quixote	唐吉可德		
2010	Love Tactics	爱情36计		
2010	Super Player	大玩家		
2010	The Kidnap	绑架冰激凌		
2012	Truth or Dare	真心话大冒险	Mr. Wang	
2012	Dark Wedding	诡婚		
2012	The Death of the Jade	聚客镇	Master Wen	
2012	Three Miracle Heroes: Miracles of Cards	奇迹三雄之扑克牌游戏	Luo Qi	
2012	Chrysanthemum to the Beast	给野兽献花		
2012	Save the 365th Day	拯救第365天		voice acting
2013	The King of Comedy	喜剧王	Lin Zhuosheng; Shi Dawei	
2013	Lover Run	粉红女郎之爱人快跑		
2013	The Twins' Code	孪生密码		
2013	Love You for Loving Me	我爱的是你爱我	An Dong	
2018	Three Lives Three Worlds			
2019	Medicine God			

=== Television ===
Year	English title	Chinese title	Role	Notes
1987	Genghis Khan	成吉思汗	Jamukha	
1987	Hong Kong Love	香港情		
1987	Gambler	賭徒		
1988	Those Famous Women in Chinese History	歷代奇女子		
1989	Temptresses of a Thousand Faces	千面俏嬌娃		
1989	Delightful Meals	安樂茶飯		
1989	Police Archives	皇家檔案		
1989	Storm in Shanghai	上海風雲		
1989	Hey, Big Brother	司機大佬	Fung Tai-loi	
1991	The Fiery Daddy and His Three Sweeties	乖女也瘋狂		
1991	The Good Fella from Temple Street	廟街豪情	Kwan Chi-yung	
1991	The Burning Rain	暴雨燃燒		
1992	Casanova in China	伯虎為卿狂	Tang Yin	
1994	The Heaven Sword and Dragon Saber	倚天屠龍記	Yang Xiao	
1994	The Seven Heroes and Five Gallants	七俠五義	Bai Yutang	
1996	Taiwan Paranormal Events	台灣靈異事件		
1997	Love Is Payable	儂本多情	Ma Xianliang	
1998	The Return of the Condor Heroes	神鵰俠侶	Guo Jing	
2000	State of Divinity	笑傲江湖	Tian Boguang	
2000	Sunny Piggy	春光燦爛豬八戒	Taibai Jinxing	
2002	Wind and Cloud	風雲	Nameless	
2003	Flying Daggers	飛刀又見飛刀	Xue Qingbi	
2004	Hi! Honey	嗨！親爱的	Xu Shu De	
2004	Amor de Tarapaca	紫藤戀	Zhao Erxiang	
2004	Wind and Cloud 2	風雲2	Xiongba	
2004	Lady Wu: The First Empress	至尊紅顏	Zhangsun Wuji	
2005	The Prince Who Turns into a Frog	王子變青蛙		
2006	Sound of Colors	地下鐵	Cheng Gao	
2006	Iron General Agui	鐵將軍阿貴	Agui	
2007	The Fairies of Liaozhai	聊齋奇女子	Prefect Lin	
2008	The Last Princess	最後的格格	Shen Shihao	
2009	Happiness 3+2	幸福3+2	Yao Mingyuan	
2009	Weaving Fairy and Cowherd	牛郎織女	Kitchen God	
2009	The Diamond Family	鉆石豪門	Yu Botao	
2009	Aliens at Home	家有外星人	Tang Chao	sitcom
2010	Entangling Love in Shanghai	儂本多情	Qiao Xiannong	remake of Love Is Payable
2010	Fashion Kingdom	时尚王国	Wang Yang	
2011	Dark War in the Dawn	黎明前的暗戰	Chen Mingren	
2011	The Holy Pearl	女媧傳說之靈珠	Shi Youming	
2013	Forward Contracts	远期的合约	Fan Yong	
2015	Master of Destiny	縱橫天地	Yiu Dai-ming	

== Discography ==
=== Album ===
Ke Da Xin Li Mian (可達心裡面)

Studio album
- Released: August 1991
- Genre: Mandopop
- Length: 40:00
- Label: Dianjiang (點將)
- Producer: Joe Butler

No.	Title	Lyrics	Music	Length
1.	"Ke Da Xin Li Mian" (可達心裡面; "Able to Reach My Heart")	Yao Chien	Sun Chung-wei, Huang Chuo-ying	3:11
2.	"Wo de Xin Ru Jia Bao Huan" (我的心如假包換; "Replacement Guaranteed if My Heart Is Fake")	Yao Chien	Sun Chung-wei	4:10
3.	"Rang Wo Likai" (讓我離開; "Let Me Leave")	Li Yao	Chang Han-chun	5:03
4.	"When a Man Meet a Woman"	Yen Shu	Huang Chuo-ying	3:24
5.	"Bie Shuo Hai Zao Hai Zao" (別說還早還早; "Don't Say 'Still Early, Still Early'")	Wakin Chau	Wakin Chau	4:03
6.	"Fei Ba! BABY" (飛吧！BABY; "Fly! Baby")	Yao Chien	Huang Chuo-ying	4:12
7.	"Shuo Fu Xinqing" (說服心情; "Persuade Mood")	Li Yao	Huang Chuo-ying	4:19
8.	"Sha Wenti" (傻問題; "Stupid Question")	Yen Shu	Sun Chung-wei	3:23
9.	"Daodi Wo Zai Deng Shui" (到底我在等誰; "Who Am I Waiting For After All")	Kevin Tsai	Huang Chuo-ying	4:26
10.	"Aiqing Woniu" (愛情蝸牛; "Love Snail")	Li Yao	Huang Chuo-ying	3:48

=== Other songs ===
Year	Song	Lyrics	Music	Notes
1987	"Si Haau Zan Tin" (獅吼震天; "The Heaven-Shaking Lion Roar")	Chung Kai Cheong	Kwan Sheng-yau	opening theme for King of the Lion Dance
2000	"Yuwang" (欲望; "Desire")	Qian Qian	San Bao	opening theme for Desire
2004	"Xiao Ao Feng Yun" (笑傲風雲; "Proudly Smiling in Wind and Cloud")	Ardor Huang	Chou Chih-hua	opening theme for Wind and Cloud 2
2004	"Fengliu Rensheng" (風流人生; "Playboy Life"), ft. Zhu Jialiang	Chen Xuanping	Zhou Jinjin	opening theme for The Romantic King of Dramas (風流戲王)
2009	"Qimiao Zhi Jia" (奇妙之家; "Fantastic Home")	Wang Juan	Yang Fan	ending theme for Aliens at Home

== Scandal ==
Sun was arrested by the police in Beijing on April 22, 2011 for taking illegal drugs. He served 19 days in detention.
