= Chen Zihan =

Chinese actress

- Born: Chen Shasha (陈莎莎); 2 April 1978 (age 48); Chongqing, China
- Occupation: Actress
- Years active: 1990s–present
- Agent: Huayi Brothers
- Spouse: Dai Xiangyu (m. 2016)

Chinese name
- Traditional Chinese: 陳紫函
- Simplified Chinese: 陈紫函
Transcriptions
Standard Mandarin
- Hanyu Pinyin: Chén Zǐ Hán

Birth name
- Traditional Chinese: 陳莎莎
- Simplified Chinese: 陈莎莎
Transcriptions
Standard Mandarin
- Hanyu Pinyin: Chén Shā Shā

Chen Zihan (born 2 April 1978 as Chen Shasha) is a Chinese actress. She graduated from the Beijing Film Academy. While the majority of sources state Chen's birth date as 2 April 1978, some claim that she was born on 2 April 1975. In September 2025, Chen revealed that she had to pause acting for three years to try for a child through IVF.

== Filmography ==
=== Film ===
Year	English title	Chinese title	Role	Notes/Ref.
1996	Battles for Glory Over Taihang Mountains	浴血太行	student	
1997		家和万事兴	Tan Shasha	
1998		报应		
1999	The Mirror	怪谈之魔镜	Miss Wang	
1999	Madam Li Zhifan	李知凡太太	Hu Xingfen	
2005		明星制造	Xiaofan	
2007	Mr. An! Happy Birthday	生日快樂!安先生	Zhao Na	
2010	The Hero Special Police	特警英雄	Ye Feng	
2011	Legendary Amazons	杨门女将之军令如山	Yang Yanqi	
2012	Death Zone	地域无门	Xia Meng	
2018	Dream Stealer	盗梦者		

=== Television series ===
Year	English title	Chinese title	Role	Notes/Ref.
1996		东周列国春秋篇	Zhen E	
1997	Love Is Payable	侬本多情	Yang Ming	
1997		至高荣誉	Biyu	
1997		传奇人生	Liu Cai	
1997		绿野之恋	Lin Zhen	
1997		同一片蓝天	Kuniu	
1998		女巡按	Ma Tiantian	
1998		春风得意猪八戒		
1998		绝地苍狼	Laixi	
1998		金融大风暴	Fang Ming	
1999		无情海峡有情天	Wen Suxin	
1999		我们的生活	Ding Nannan	
2000	Forever Melody	人鬼情缘	Huanniang	
2000	Crouching Tiger, Hidden Dragon	卧虎藏龙	Xie Qianqian	
2000	State of Divinity	笑傲江湖	Lan Fenghuang	
2000		南北一家亲	You Rou	
2001	The Prince of Han Dynasty	大汉天子	Princess Pingyang	
2001	Love Stories of Northern Africa	情定北非	Guo Min	
2001	Su Xiaoxiao	一代名妓苏小小	Wansu	
2001		如影随形	Lin Hong	
2001		汽车城	Pan Xinming	
2002	Lies	谎言	Xia Haozhen	
2003	The Heaven Sword and Dragon Saber	倚天屠龙记	Yin Li	
2003	A Chinese Ghost Story	倩女幽魂	Shangguan Yu'er	
2003		非常小院	Mu Xiaoyu	
2004	Honghai'er	红孩儿	Vixen spirit	
2004	My Fair Lady	我爱钟无艳	Xia Yingchun	
2004		律政佳人	Chen Birou	
2005		站在你背后	Chi Hanxiang	
2005		爱上天使	Tang Baolin	
2006	Madame White Snake	白蛇传	Green Snake	
2006	The Return of the Condor Heroes	神雕侠侣	Guo Fu	
2006		非常女警	Chen Nan	
2006	True Blood	雪在烧	Luo Rou	
2007	Love Strategy	恋爱兵法	Ouyang Mingming	
2008	The Blue Files	蓝色档案	Wen	
2008		延安锄奸	Yanxi	
2008	Mysterious House	滴血深宅	Gege	
2008		善良背后	Yang Ling	
2009		上海锄奸		
2009	Black Rose	黑玫瑰	Li Zihan	
2010	Our Team to the Sun	我们队伍向太阳	Chaduo	
2010	The Myth	神话	Lü Zhi	
2010	The Legend of Crazy Monk	活佛济公	Yanzhi	
2010	Down With Love	就想赖着你	Ding Huifan	
2012	Secret Agent	密使	Luo Meihui	
2012		黎明绝杀	Yezi	
2012	Bandit of the Brothers	东北往事	Kangtian Meihui	
2012		搜神记	Xiangyao	
2012	The Legend of Crazy Monk 3	活佛济公3	Yanzhi	
2012		妈妈你到底在哪里	Zhang Ruoyun	
2013	A Happy Life	天天有喜	Bai Lanying	
2013	Beau-Care Clinic	美人季		
2013	Protect Love Fearlessly	爱情面前谁怕谁	Luo Meiqi	
2013	The Demi-Gods and Semi-Devils	天龙八部	Xiao Yuanshan's wife	
2014		猎魔		
2014	Earth God and Earth Grandmother	土地公土地婆	Jiang Qiulian	
2014		天下一碗	Meng Zihui	
2014	Swords of Legends	古剑奇谭	Hong Yu	
2014	New Mad Monk	新济公活佛	Zhang Wanrou	
2014		我姥爷1945	Liu Yiran	
2014	The Romance of the Condor Heroes	神雕侠侣	Qiu Yinong	
2015	Singles Villa	只因单身在一起	Ren Xiaoxiao	
2015	My Amazing Bride	极品新娘	Empress Dowager	
2015	The Female Assassins in the Palace	金钗谍影	Ruimin Princess	
2015	The First Column	第一纵队	Jian Yi	
2016	A Happy Life 2	天天有喜之人间有爱	Wang Jinzhu	
2016	The Story of Liu Hai and Jinchan	刘海戏金蟾	Hu Yingxiu	
2016	Impossible Mission	不可能完成的任务	Shangguan Yu	
2016	Demon Girl	半妖倾城	Hua Yuenong	
2016	Happy Mitan	欢喜密探	Hong Baniu	
2016	Pearl Earrings	珍珠耳环	Yan Zhi	
2016	Demon Girl II	半妖倾城第二季	Hua Yuenong	
2018	Cover The Sky	素手遮天	Empress	
2018	24 Hours	限定24小时	Ying Xi	
2018	The Dark Lord	夜天子	Madame Ya	
2018	Chong Er's Preach	重耳传	Zhou Yuji	
2019	Moli	茉莉	Ye Moli	
2020	Rebirth of Shopping Addict	我不是购物狂	Yan Yanran	
2020	A Chinese Ghost Story	只问今生恋沧溟	Lao Lao	
2021	Word of honor	山河令	Tragic ghost	
TBA	The Fated General	大漠骠骑—霍去病	Wei Zifu	
TBA	Beautiful Temptation	美丽的诱惑	Zhang Mei	
TBA	Cold Love Be Passionately in Love	冷爱热恋	Tang Na	
TBA	Tian Si Chuan	填四川		
TBA	Nezha and Yang Jian	哪吒与杨戬	Yin Lianhua	
TBA	Shanghai Picked Flowers	十里洋场拾年花	Lin Ruo'ning	
TBA	The Corridor Pavilion	回廊亭		
2026	Where the Mask Ends	Wei Heng'e		

== Awards and nominations ==
Year	Event	Category	Nominated work	Result	Ref.
2020	7th The Actors of China Awards	Best Actress (Sapphire)	—N/a	Nominated	
