= Far North (2007 film) =

- Directed by: Asif Kapadia
- Written by: Asif Kapadia; Tim Miller; Sara Maitland (story)
- Starring: Michelle Yeoh; Michelle Krusiec; Sean Bean
- Cinematography: Roman Osin
- Edited by: Ewa J. Lind
- Music by: Dario Marianelli
- Release date: 26 December 2007
- Running time: 89 minutes
- Countries: United Kingdom; France
- Language: English

Far North is an independently produced film by director Asif Kapadia, based on a short story by Sara Maitland. It was screened at various film festivals in 2007 and 2008 before an American DVD release on 23 September 2008.

== Plot ==
The film opens up with a voiceover of a woman named Saiva telling the listener that a shaman said she was cursed at birth and would bring harm to anyone she cared for. While she and a young woman named Anja are camping in a subarctic region of Siberia, in desperation, she takes one of her sled dogs and after calming it, slits its throat. She and Anja then set out to relocate their camp. On the way, they almost get caught by Soviet/Russian soldiers. Fearing the worst, Saiva ventures out with Anja into the far north to the arctic tundra, passing abandoned telephone wire trees and to the area where she believes no one would ever find them. After a long paddle north, they pitch camp on a beach, where they set up their yurt.

While sleeping in the night, Saiva has a flashback to her past among the reindeer tribes, after being shunned by her own tribe. In her flashback, she encounters a man who invites her into his tribe to help with the reindeer round-up. The two fall in love with each other, and after a time he gives her a wolf claw necklace. Going back to the present, Saiva and Anja live a harsh brutal life in the tundra hunting animals for their survival. One day while hunting alone, Saiva encounters a badly wounded man nearly frozen and starved to death. After his collapse, she tries to loot him, but the man regains consciousness briefly and asks for her help. Accepting him, Saiva brings him to the yurt and cleans his wounds.

Later the man claims the name of "Loki". The next day on a hunting trip with them, Loki asks what he can do for them in return for their kindness; Saiva replies "We'll see", but Anja asks him to bring a reindeer. After a successful seal hunt, Loki tells Saiva in their yurt that he was an escapee from soldiers that came to clear out the tundra, and that if they find him they will shoot him. He then shows them his portable hand-cranked radio. Later, Loki tries to keep his promise by bringing them a reindeer. But as he is about to shoot one, he is detained by a couple of Soviet soldiers. Just as they are about to put him in their boat, he fights back and kills both of them. He then comes back with their looted supplies and gives them to Saiva and Anja. Saiva tries to warn him about her secret, but Anja interrupts her and they hang out with each other more and more. Another flashback scene shows Saiva finding all of her tribe dead, except for the man that she fell in love with, who is tied up. One of the soldiers slits the man's throat, after he spit in his face. When she tries to run away, the soldiers catch her and the same one who killed the man rapes her. She finds a baby girl after that in one of the yurts. One of the soldiers asks her to lead them to the mainland, as they are lost, and in return promises to keep her and the baby alive. It is implied that this baby is Anja. Later when she and the soldiers were crossing a glacier, she uses a knife to cut the rope and then pulls all of the soldiers into a crevasse.

Anja and Loki spend more and more time together during the following months. One night when Saiva is out hunting, they have intercourse. Loki eventually fulfills his promise on killing a reindeer. As their love builds up, and Anja is pregnant, Loki and Anja plan on leaving to go to civilization and have a family of their own. When Anja tells this to Saiva one evening, Saiva is visibly shaken and speechless. As tension builds up Saiva's mind gets more and more worked up with depression of her daughter's leave; even when Anja asks her to come with them she is speechless. That night Loki goes out hunting. Saiva tricks by offering Anja to comb and braid her hair, but suddenly chokes her to death with the braid. She then skins Anja's face and disguises herself with it. When Loki comes back, he has sex with Saiva, assuming that she is Anja. Saiva says she loves him. When he then discovers Saiva's identity, he is horrified and flees the yurt naked into the frozen tundra. The film ends with Saiva sobbing alone in her yurt.

== Cast ==
- Michelle Yeoh as Saiva
- Michelle Krusiec as Anja
- Sean Bean as Loki

== Reception ==
On the review aggregator website Rotten Tomatoes, 86% of 7 critics' reviews are positive.
