= The Great Conqueror's Concubine =

1994 Hong Kong film by Stephen Shin

- DVD cover art
- Traditional Chinese: 西楚霸王
- Simplified Chinese: 西楚霸王
- Directed by: Stephen Shin; Wei Handao
- Written by: Liu Heng; Stephen Shin; Xiao He; Shi Yangping
- Produced by: Zhang Yimou
- Starring: Ray Lui; Rosamund Kwan; Zhang Fengyi; Gong Li
- Cinematography: Lee Chi-wa; Muk Tak-yuen; Cheng Siu-keung; Wong Bo-man
- Edited by: Huang Yongming
- Music by: James Wong; Romeo Diaz
- Production company: Long Shong Pictures
- Release date: 9 June 1994
- Running time: 181 minutes
- Country: Hong Kong
- Language: Mandarin
- Box office: HK$15,735,456

The Great Conqueror's Concubine, alternatively known as King of Western Chu, is a 1994 Hong Kong historical drama film directed by Stephen Shin and Wei Handao, starring Ray Lui, Rosamund Kwan, Zhang Fengyi and Gong Li. The film is based on the events in the Chu–Han Contention, an interregnum between the fall of the Qin dynasty and the founding of the Han dynasty.

The Hong Kong cut of the film is 3 hours long and was released in two instalments of 1.5 hours each, which opened one day apart (respectively June 9 and 10). For the mainland Chinese market, the material was edited down into a single 2-hour film.

== Cast ==
- Ray Lui as Xiang Yu
- Rosamund Kwan as Consort Yu
- Zhang Fengyi as Liu Bang
- Gong Li as Lü Zhi
- Chin Shih-chieh as Zhang Liang
- To Siu-chun as Xiao He
- Lau Shun as Fan Zeng
- Wu Hsing-kuo as Yu Ziqi
- Hsu Chan as Qin Shi Huang
- Chang Shih as Qin Er Shi
- Chen Sung-young as Fan Kuai
- Yeh Chuan-chen as Liu Bang's servant
- Yu Hai as Xiang Liang
- Jin Demao as Xiang Bo
- Xu Xiangdong as Xiang Zhuang
- Elvis Tsui as Zhongli Mo
- Kwan Hoi-san as Zhao Gao
- Yang Fan as Tian Rong
- Ku Pao-ming as King Huai II of Chu
- Xu Guanglin as Cao Shen
- Xue Liang as Ziying
- Li Yanping as Eunuch
- Nige Mutu as Wang Li
- Zhang Lihua as Ying Bu
- Zhang Xuehao as Zhang Han
- Liu Hen as Liu Taigong
- Han Xiuli as Liu Bang's grandmother

== See also ==
- List of Asian historical drama films
