= Secret Love for the Peach Blossom Spring =

Chinese stage play

Secret Love in Peach Blossom Land (Chinese: 暗戀桃花源; pinyin: Anlian Taohuayuan), also known as Secret Love for the Peach Blossom Spring, written by Stan Lai (賴聲川) was the second stage play by the Performance Workshop (表演工作坊) in 1986, and also the first successful modern stage play in Taiwan. It combines two unrelated plays – a tragedy (Secret Love) and a comedy (The Peach Blossom Land) – on the same stage, mixing seriousness with banters. The play for which the Performance Workshop is best-known, it is "considered an iconic mainstay of contemporary Chinese theater."

This play starts with two drama troupes arranged to have a rehearsal at the same time by mistake; one of the workshops is playing the early-modern tragedy Secret Love, and the other one is playing the period comedy The Peach Blossom Spring based on a classical poem. The problem is, both these plays have to perform in two days. Since they have only one stage for their rehearsals, issues and conflicts follow. Secret Love for the Peach Blossom Spring creates a unique experience of stage play by mixing up the costume and modern, sorrow and delight.

A feature of this play is that is it was extemporized by the director, Stan Lai, all actress and actors. The originality renewed the view of Taiwan's drama, and then affected the Asian performing arts.

This play was first performed on March 3, 1986. In these twenty years, the play has been adapted to a movie and revised thrice: the first revision was in 1999, the second was in September 2006, and the third was in April 2015. Each performance has its own specificity. The first performance addressed the creation of style of modern play, the first revision in 1999 included some young performers and implied the translation between two generations of performer. The second revision in 2006 involved a famous Taiwanese opera (歌仔戲) group, Ming Hwa Yuan (明華園). The combination between stage play and Taiwanese opera is another innovation of modern theatre in Taiwan. The third revision was also a translation to English, and was performed at the Oregon Shakespeare Festival. This adaption mentioned the issues with translation between languages and cultures, like the first revision which implied the translation between generations. It also added many location-specific jokes in the spirit of the play as an improvisation.

The success of this play led to a film in 1992, directed also by Stan Lai. It stars Brigitte Lin and some of the actors from the stage version of the play, such as Chin Shih-chieh. The title is identical in Chinese but its English title is shortened to The Peach Blossom Land.

In 2007 Lai and his troupe took the play to the mainland. Up until then the play had been performed widely and video recordings circulated freely, but only in unauthorized versions. The 2007 production received massive attention in the media and played several dozen sold-out performances in Beijing before touring Chongqing, Hong Kong, and Shanghai, among other cities. Lai used the occasion to challenge the mainland theater world. He said that when he originally produced it under martial law in Taiwan, the play was taboo. "With the opening up of China", he went on, "I thought there'd be so many great playwrights and directors. Where are they?"
