= Time's Orphan =

- Star Trek: Deep Space Nine episode
- Episode no.: Season 6 Episode 24
- Directed by: Allan Kroeker
- Story by: Joe Menosky
- Teleplay by: Bradley Thompson; David Weddle
- Cinematography by: Jonathan West
- Production code: 548
- Original air date: May 18, 1998

Guest appearances
- Rosalind Chao as Keiko O'Brien; Hana Hatae as Molly O'Brien; Michelle Krusiec as 18-year-old Molly

Episode chronology
| ← Previous "Profit and Lace" | Next → "The Sound of Her Voice" |
- Star Trek: Deep Space Nine season 6

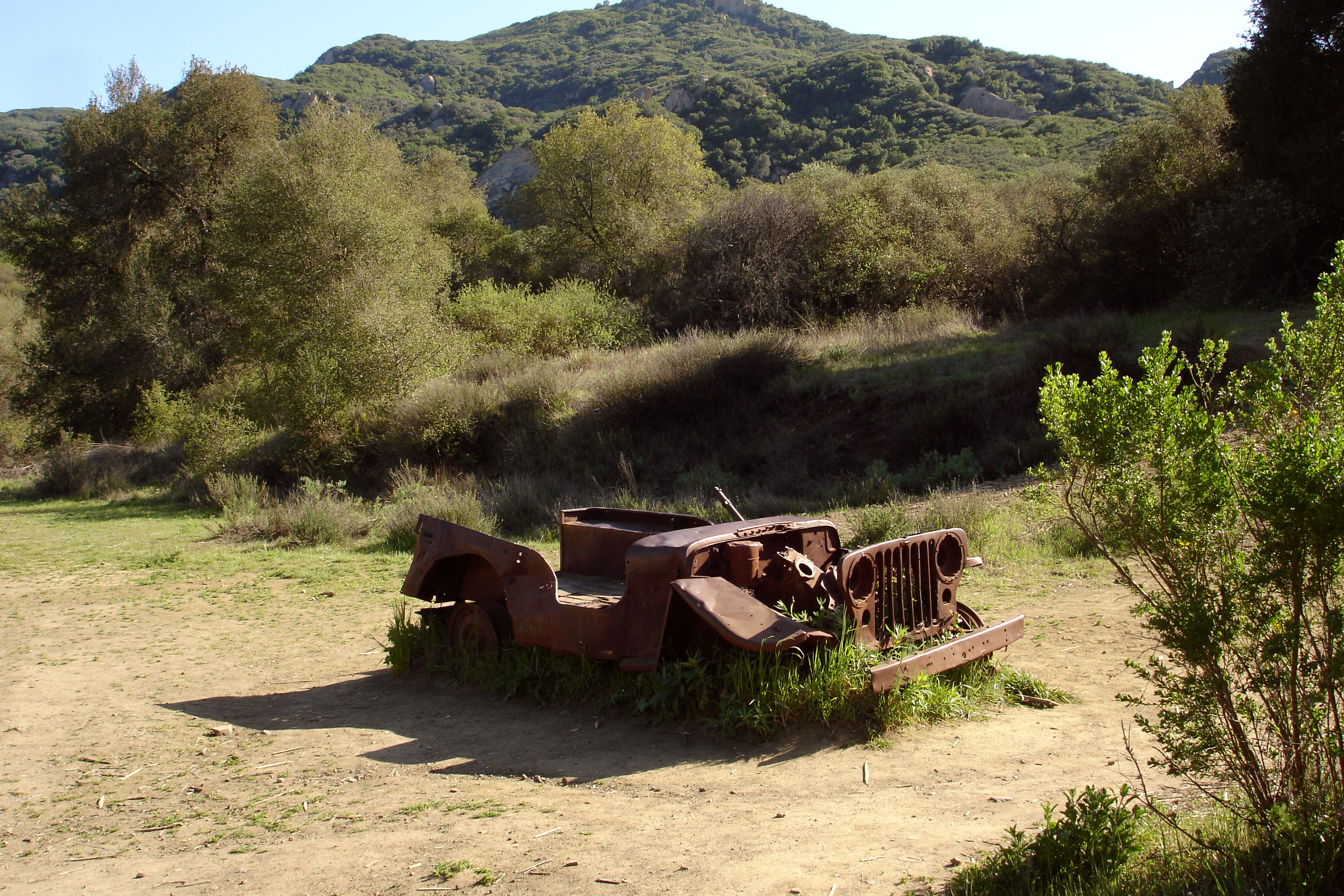
Outdoor scenes of Golana were filmed in Malibu Creek State Park

"Time's Orphan" is the 148th episode of the syndicated American science fiction television series Star Trek: Deep Space Nine, the 24th episode of the sixth season.

Set in the 24th century, the series follows the adventures on Deep Space Nine, a space station located near a stable wormhole between the Alpha and Gamma quadrants of the Milky Way Galaxy. In this episode, young Molly O'Brien (Hana Hatae) falls into an alien time portal and is rescued ten years older as a feral 18-year-old. Michelle Krusiec guest stars as time-portal Molly.

Aired on television the week of May 18, 1998, it received Nielsen ratings of 4.6 points corresponding to about 4.5 million viewers.

== Plot ==
Miles and Keiko O'Brien take their children to the planet Golana for a picnic. While playing, eight-year-old Molly falls into an abandoned time portal, which closes after Molly passes through. It sends her 300 years into the past to a time when the planet was uninhabited. The crew of Deep Space Nine helps the O'Briens recover Molly by reopening the portal and using a transporter to lock onto her signal. However, they find the portal has opened at a different time. The Molly they rescue is 18 years old and has grown feral, having survived alone for ten years. She is brought back to the station and placed in a special habitat made to resemble Golana.

Molly slowly remembers her parents, but is still barely controllable. She asks her parents to take her home, but later makes it clear that she wants to be returned to Golana. Her parents take her to a holosuite simulation of Golana. She responds positively, but when the simulation is deactivated, she becomes violent and assaults a man. Starfleet informs the O'Briens that it plans to put Molly into a mental institution, which worries them. With help from a sympathetic Odo, they arrange to return Molly to Golana, planning to destroy the portal afterwards to prevent Starfleet from finding her. Molly returns through the portal but encounters her younger self shortly after she had fallen through. The older Molly points her younger self back through the portal, then as soon as the younger Molly returns, the older Molly disappears. Molly reappears moments before Miles is about to destroy the portal, and the family reunites happily.

== Production ==
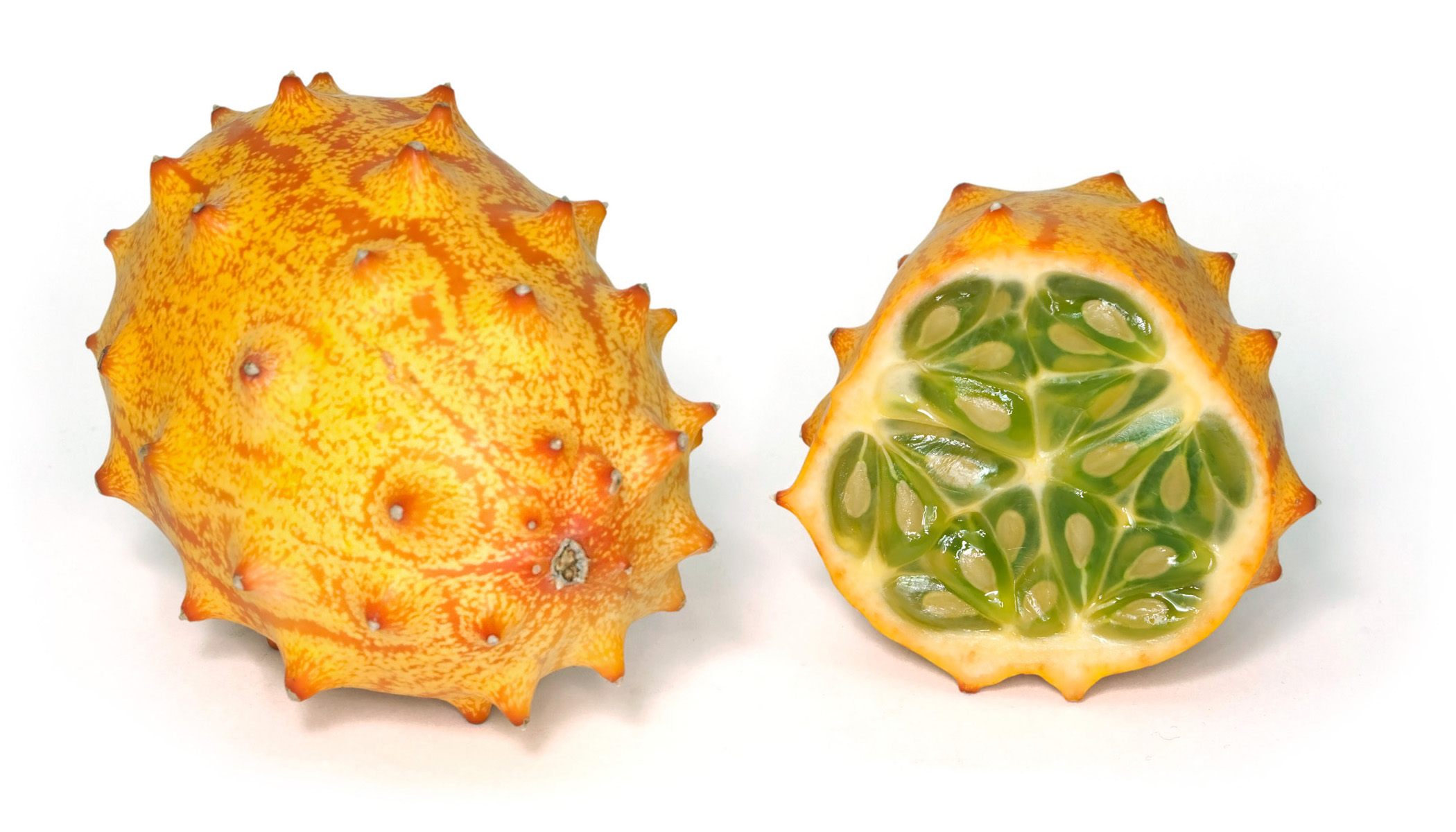
A kiwano, which plays the role of a Golanan fruit in this episode.

The outdoor shots of the exoplanet the O'Brien's visit, later recreated in the holosuite, were filmed at Malibu Creek State Park in California. The nature park is in the Santa Monica Mountains of that region, on the west coast of the continental United States. According to the Deep Space Nine Companion the rocks for the "stonehenge" were fiberglass props.

The melon from Golana that the O'Briens feed Molly was an actual fruit, the kiwano (Cucumis metuliferus) which has a yellowish exterior and green interior.

== Reception ==
Keith DeCandido of Tor.com rated the episode 4 out of 10.

A 2015 binge-watching guide for Star Trek: Deep Space Nine by Wired recommended skipping this episode.

== See also ==
- Feral child
