= Profit and Lace =

- Star Trek: Deep Space Nine episode
- Episode no.: Season 6 Episode 23
- Directed by: Alexander Siddig
- Written by: Ira Steven Behr; Hans Beimler
- Production code: 547
- Original air date: May 11, 1998

Guest appearances
- Henry Gibson as Nilva; Jeffrey Combs as Brunt; Max Grodénchik as Rom; Aron Eisenberg as Nog; Cecily Adams as Ishka; Chase Masterson as Leeta; Tiny Ron as Maihar'du; Sylvain Cecile as Uri'lash; Symba Smith as Alura; Wallace Shawn as Grand Nagus Zek

Episode chronology
| ← Previous "Valiant" | Next → "Time's Orphan" |
- Star Trek: Deep Space Nine season 6

"Profit and Lace" is the 147th episode of the television series Star Trek: Deep Space Nine, the 23rd episode of the sixth season. It was first broadcast on May 11, 1998.

Set in the 24th century, the series follows the adventures on the space station Deep Space Nine. This episode is one of several episodes focusing on the Ferengi, an alien race characterized by their love of monetary profit and their sexist social norms. In this episode, Deep Space Nine's Ferengi bartender Quark helps out when Zek's status as the Grand Nagus of the Ferengi Alliance is put in jeopardy by his proposal of equal rights for female Ferengi.

The episode received Nielsen ratings of 4.2 points corresponding to about 4.1 million viewers. It is regarded by some fans and critics as one of the worst episodes of the series.

== Plot ==
The episode opens with Quark sexually harassing one of his best waitresses. Rom rushes in to declare that, while trying to contact their mother, Ishka, he has lost contact with their home planet of Feringinar. He fears that the Dominion have taken over the planet. When they go and explain the situation to Captain Sisko, sensors pick up an incoming ship which is carrying both Grand Nagus Zek and Ishka.

The Nagus explains that by changing the Ferengi Bill of Opportunities to allow women to wear clothes, he has caused planet-wide upheaval and has been replaced by Former Liquidator Brunt who will be officially installed by the commission at its next meeting.

Quark, Rom and Nog contact all 432 of the Ferengi commissioners to come to DS9 to meet and talk about the situation. Only one commissioner agrees. Brunt finds out about the upcoming meeting and arrives on the station to torment Quark and thwart his plans. After standing up to Brunt and throwing him out of the bar, Quark and his mother return to Quark's quarters. They get into a shouting match, with Quark blaming his mother for everything that has happened to Zek, while Ishka argues that before Zek met her, he was a lonely man. The shouting match causes her to suffer a heart attack, and Dr. Bashir performs a transplant. Without Ishka to stand up and speak for herself at the meeting, Quark poses as a woman named Lumba to try and fool the commissioner.

Over dinner Quark/Lumba has to fend off the advances of the commissioner while explaining the benefits of the increase in the workforce and consumer base that Ferengi women would bring. Once in the commissioner's room, the commissioner goes into full assault, chasing Quark around the apartment. Finally Brunt bursts in and tries to unmask Lumba as an impostor and a man. This fails when "she" removes her dress, revealing her female anatomy to Brunt and the commissioner. Convinced, the commissioner pledges his support for Zek. Later Quark's sex change is reversed and Zek and Ishka leave the station anticipating Zek's restoration as Grand Nagus. Quark apologizes to his mother, who accepts his apology. She tells him that while he was a lousy son, he made a wonderful daughter. After Zek and Ishka leave, Quark apologizes to the waitress he harassed at the start of the episode and gives her a raise.

== Reception ==
A 2015 binge-watching guide for Star Trek: Deep Space Nine by Wired recommended skipping this episode.

In 2016, SyFy included this episode in a group of Star Trek franchise episodes they felt were commonly disliked but "deserved a second chance".

In 2018, CBR included this episode in a list of Star Trek episodes that are "so bad they must be seen."
