= Stan Lai =

Taiwanese film director (born 1954)

- 賴聲川
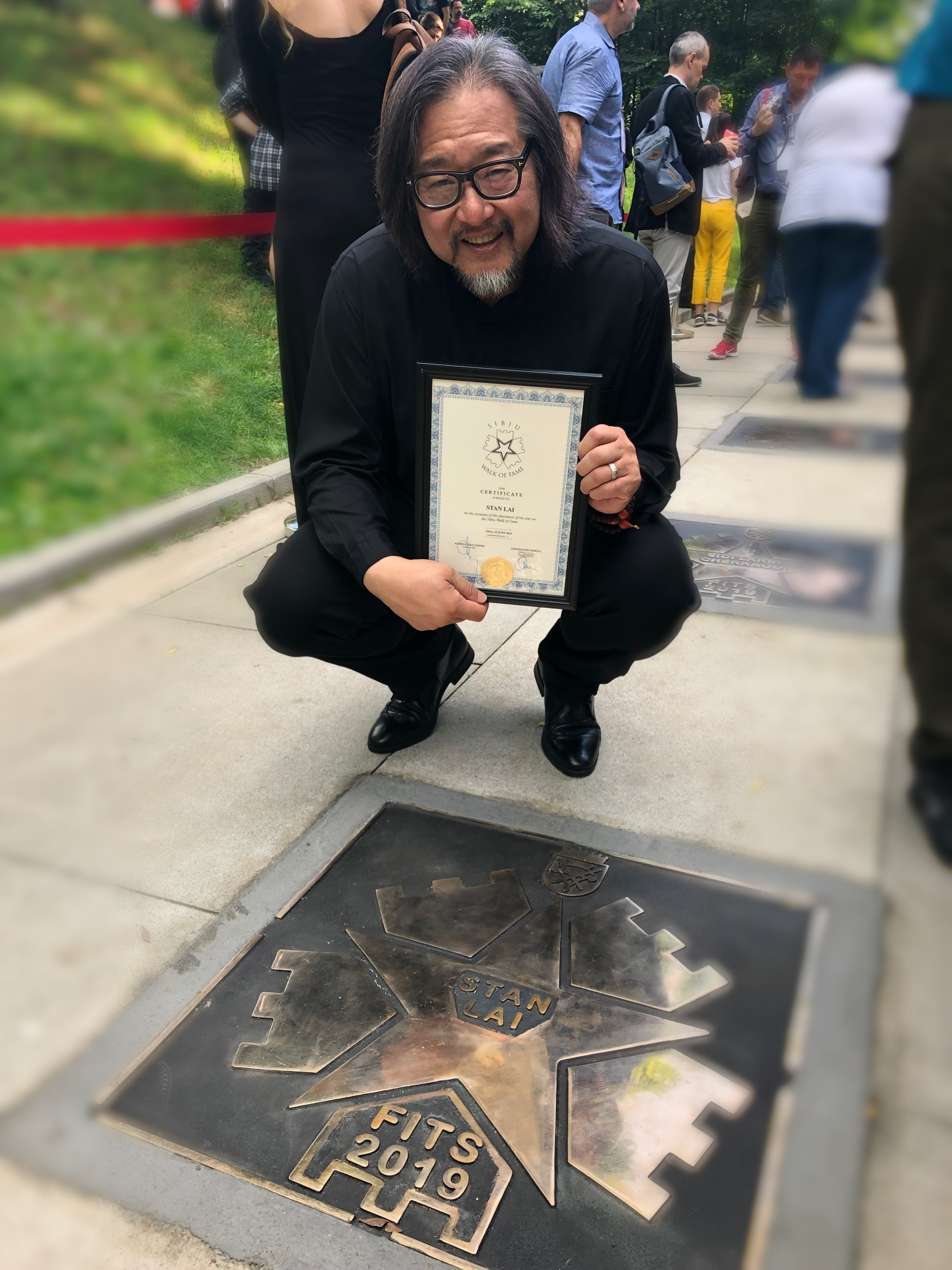
- Lai in 2019
- Born: 25 October 1954 (age 72); Washington D.C., U.S.
- Education: Doctor of Philosophy
- Alma mater: Fu Jen Catholic University; University of California, Berkeley
- Occupations: Playwright, Theatre director, festival director, professor
- Spouse: Ding Nai-chu (m. 1978)
- Children: 2
- Relatives: Pawo Choyning Dorji (son-in-law)
- Writing career
- Years active: 1984-present
- Notable works: Secret Love in Peach Blossom Land, The Village, A Dream Like a Dream, AGO
- Notable awards: Secret Love in Peach Blossom Land: Silver Sakura Award Tokyo International Film Festival; Caligari Prize Berlin International Film Festival; Silver Screen Award for Best Film, Best Director, NETPAC-FIPRESCI Award Singapore International Film Festival
- Website: pwshop.com

Stan Lai or Lai Sheng-chuan (traditional Chinese: 賴聲川; simplified Chinese: 赖声川; pinyin: Lài Shēngchuān, born 25 October 1954) is an American-born Taiwanese playwright and theater director who is perhaps best known for his play Secret Love in Peach Blossom Land, chosen by The New York Times as one of ″The Essential Works of Theater Since World War I.″. Lai is also a filmmaker, and a practitioner of Tibetan Buddhism and has translated multiple books on the subject. Robert Brustein has called Lai "The major contemporary Asian playwright of his time, perhaps of all time."

In 2007, Lai became a best-selling author in Taiwan and China with his book on creativity called Stan Lai On Creativity (Chinese Pinyin: Lai Shengchuan de Chuangyixue), based on a course on Creativity he taught at Stanford University. This book has gained a reputation in business as well as artistic readers as a unique take on how one can train in creativity. Lai published the English version Creativitry in 2025.

== Life ==
Lai was born on 25 October 1954 in Washington D.C., where his father was serving in the Republic of China's Embassy. He returned to Taiwan with his mother in 1966. Lai studied English literature at Fu Jen Catholic University and graduated in 1976. In 1978, Lai married Ding Nai-chu (丁乃竺). After the marriage, the couple went to the US for further studies. The couple have two daughters.

Lai received his Ph.D. in Dramatic Art from University of California, Berkeley in 1983. After his return to Taiwan, Lai taught and served as Dean of School of Theatre Arts at Taipei National University of the Arts. In 1984, Lai and Ding, along with Taiwanese actors Lee Li-chun and Lee Kuo-hsiu, founded Performance Workshop, a contemporary theatre group that has become one of the most celebrated in the Chinese world. Lai became the Artistic Director while Ding served as the managing director. Their work has revitalized theatre in Taiwan and continually pioneered new horizons in modern Chinese theatre. Since its founding in 1984, Performance Workshop has produced more than 40 of Lai's theatrical works and collaborations, including iconic pieces such as Secret Love in Peach Blossom Land, The Village, A Dream Like a Dream, and AGO.

In 2006 and 2007, Lai taught at Stanford University as Visiting Professor and Resident Artist for the I.D.A. program. In 2013 he lectured at Berkeley as Avenali Fellow and Artist in Residence. In 2019 he taught at Berkeley as Artist-in-Residence.

A prolific author of 40 original performed plays to date, Lai was also commissioned by the government of the Republic of China to work on a number of large-scale events in Taiwan. In 2009 Lai was Creative Director of the acclaimed opening and closing ceremonies for the International Deaflympics Games in Taipei. In 2010, Lai worked as Creative Director for the Gala in Celebration of the 100th Anniversary of the Founding of the Republic of China. Also In 2010 he served as Creative Director for the Taipei International Flora Exposition. Lai took on the position of General Consultant for the 2011 Taiwan Lantern Festival held in Miaoli County, attracting a whopping 8.02 million visitors. In May 2013, along with Chen Xianghong, actor Huang Lei, and theatre director Meng Jinghui, Lai co-founded the Wuzhen Theatre Festival, for which he serves as Festival Director. In April 2015, Lai's opus magnum Secret Love in Peach Blossom Land had its professional American premiere, in English, at the Oregon Shakespeare Festival, running from April 15 through October 31.

In December 2015, Lai opened Theatre Above, a 699-seat theatre located in Xujiahui, Shanghai, dedicated to the performance of his works.

In 2016, Lai directed the San Francisco Opera's production of the Chinese classic Dream of the Red Chamber.

In September 2018, Lai's Nightwalk in the Chinese Garden had its premiere at the Huntington Library. The site-specific piece was produced in collaboration with the Huntington and CalArts Center for New Performance, and in association with the Shanghai Kunqu Troupe.

As of 2024, now in his 70s, Lai continues to create new works as Artistic Director of Performance Workshop, Taipei, and Theatre Above, Shanghai. He is also the Festival Director and Head of the Jury at the Wuzhen Theatre Festival, and Artistic Founder of the Huichang Theatre Village, a project that has brought world-class theatre to a once impoverished town in Jiangxi Province, China.

== Works ==
Stan Lai's plays have been described as "The pinnacle of our era of theatre." (The Beijing News) Since 1984, his over 30 original plays have continually pioneered the way toward new horizons in modern Chinese theatre. China's prominent literary critic Yu Qiuyu says that Lai's work “always has the ability to touch the heartstrings of countless audiences.”

Lai's most famous works includes That Evening, We Performed Crosstalk (1985), which revived the dying art of "Crosstalk" in Taiwan; The Village (2008), described by the China Times as "a collectible treasure for our generation" and by the Beijing News as "The pinnacle of our era of theatre"; the 8 hour epic A Dream Like A Dream (2000), described by prominent theatre critic Raymond Zhou as "a major milestone in Chinese theater, possibly the greatest Chinese-language play since time immemorial"; and perhaps his best known play Secret Love in Peach Blossom Land (1986), described by The New York Times as "may be the most popular contemporary play in China…by the end, the audience is left to contemplate the burdens of memory, history, longing, love and the power of theater itself." Unauthorized productions of the play in China alone number over an astounding 1,000 performances. In 2007, Lai directed his own English translation of the play at Stanford University and professionally at the Oregon Shakespeare Festival in 2015.

Lai's “crosstalk” (xiangsheng) plays, starting with That Evening, We Performed Crosstalk (1985) have virtually forged a new theatrical genre. These popular works have resuscitated the dying traditional performing art form of Xiangsheng. His 8 hour A Dream Like A Dream (2000), which has been compared to Peter Brook's Mahabharata, “may be the most cosmic piece of theater in the Chinese-language canon," revealing Buddhist and universal themes of suffering and recurring life cycles in its performance format devised by Lai that places the audience in the center of the space, with performance surrounding audience.

Lai remains a significant cultural bridge between Taiwan and China, and his influence on contemporary Chinese culture continues to grow. Aside from his creative bases in Shanghai and Taipei, Lai has been commissioned to create new works in Hong Kong, Singapore, and Beijing. In 2009 Lai was also chief director of the Deaflympics Opening and closing ceremonies held in Taipei, which received high acclaim for their aesthetic beauty and representation of the deaf spirit. The Far Eastern Economic Review describes his work as "the most exciting theatre in the Chinese-speaking world." Newsweek calls it "the most recent piece of evidence that Taiwan is creating the boldest Chinese art in Asia today." International Herald Tribune says "His work is never one dimensional or linear, there are always layers to it." In 2013, Lai served as the Artistic Director of the Inaugural Wuzhen Theatre Festival in the scenic water town of Wuzhen, China. A Dream Like A Dream opened the festival, and he has created new works for the Festival such as Dream Walk (2014) and The Long, Narrow Passageway (2023). In 2023, Lai inaugurated and served as Head of the Artistic Committee of the Nanjing Festival of New Theatre, and in 2024 inaugurated the Huichang Theatre Village in his father's hometown, Huichang, Jiangxi, China, for which he wrote and directed a new work Flower in the Mirror, Moon in the Water.

Lai's main tool for playwriting in his earlier work is his use of improvisation in collaboration with the actors, which include many of the most respected names of the time. This is a method he learned from his mentor Shireen Strooker of the Amsterdam Werkteater, and he is one of the world's foremost exponents of using improvisation as a creative tool. His over 40 plays are widely varied in style and reflect on the individuality of each project he undertakes, as well as the uniqueness of each cast he works with.

Lai has also written and directed two widely acclaimed feature films, The Peach Blossom Land (1992) and The Red Lotus Society (1994). The former received top prizes at the Berlin, Tokyo, and Singapore international film festivals. His improvisational experiment in television, All In the Family are Humans (1995–97), was a surprising alternative hit on Taiwan TV and ran for 600 episodes. Lai occasionally directs the works of others, including the Chinese language premiere of Angels in America, Part I, which he translated. He has also directed innovative versions of Western classics, including an evening of Samuel Beckett plays in an ancient Chinese garden environment, Mozart’s operas Don Giovanni, Cosi fan tutte and The Marriage of Figaro, all set in Chinese backgrounds, in collaboration with Taiwan's National Symphony Orchestra.

In 2007, Lai became a best-selling author in Taiwan and China with his book on creativity called Stan Lai On Creativity (Chinese Pinyin: Lai Shengchuan de Chuangyixue), based on a course on Creativity he taught at Stanford University. This book has gained a reputation in business as well as artistic readers as a unique take on how one can train in creativity. His plays have been published in numerous Chinese editions in both Taiwan and China, as well as in English versions from Oxford and Columbia University Press. In 2011 Lai embarked on a book tour with his Stan Lai On Theatre, sharing his experience as a playwright/director for the past three decades. A collection of nine major Lai plays was published in Chinese by CITIC Press Group in 2019. A collection of 12 plays in 3 volumes by Lai, Selected Plays of Stan Lai (3 vols., Translated by Stan Lai, Edited by Lissa Tyler Renaud, University of Michigan Press, 2002) was published in English in 2022.

=== Plays, as writer and director ===
Note: Lai's plays are often written in collaboration with his actors over a process of creative rehearsals which he initiates, structures and supervises, and is responsible for the original idea, the outline, and the writing of the final script. Credit to collaborative members is given in each individual house program. Performances are in Taiwan unless otherwise noted.

- We All Grew Up This Way - 《我們都是這樣長大的》 (1984)
- Plucking Stars - 《摘星》 (1984)
- The Passer By - 《過客》 (1984)
- That Evening, We Performed Crosstalk - 《那一夜,我們說相聲》 (1985,revived for Taiwan and international tour, 1993 & 1994)
- Bach Variations - 《變奏巴哈》 (1985)
- Secret Love in Peach Blossom Land - 《暗戀桃花源》 (1986, revived 1991, 1999, Beijing production 2006 to today, Taiwanese Opera version 2006, English version at Stanford University 2007, joint Cantonese/Mandarin version 2007, Yueju opera version 2010, Hangzhou, China, Taiwan tour 2010, Oregon Shakespeare Festival 2015, Theatre Above version 2016, Anniversary version, Taiwan and on tour in China and Australia 2016; new Hakka Tea Harvest version, 2024, Huichang Theatre Village, China)
- Pastorale - 《田園生活》 (1986)
- Circle Story - 《圓環物語》 (1987, Theatre Above version 2017, on tour in China through 2019)
- Journey to the West - 《西遊記》 (1987)
- Look Who's Cross-talking Tonight? - 《這一夜,誰來說相聲?》 (1989, international tour 1989-90)
- The Island and the Other Shore - 《回頭是彼岸》 (1989)
- Strange Tales from Taiwan - 《台灣怪譚》 (1991)
- Red Sky - 《紅色的天空》 (1994, international tour 1994, new production for Hong Kong Repertory Theatre 1998, new production for historical first China/Taiwan joint production 1998-99)
- The Complete History of Chinese Thought - 《又一夜,他們說相聲》 (1997)
- Open the Door, Sir! - 《先生,開個門！》(one-act, 1998, revived 2000)
- I Me He Him - 《我和我和他和他》 (1998)
- Ménage à 13 - 《十三角關係》 (1999, Beijing production 2012 and on tour in China through 2016; new version 2022, Theatre Above, Shanghai and on tour in China)
- Lear and the 37fold Path of a Bodhisattva - 《菩薩之三十七種修行之李爾王》 (one-act, 2000, revived 2001)
- A Dream Like A Dream - 《如夢之夢》 (2000, Cantonese version 2002, Mandarin version revived 2005, Beijing production 2013 and on tour in China till today, Wuzhen Theatre Festival inaugural opening performance 2013, new Hong Kong version by Hong Kong Repertory Theatre at Freespace, West Kowloon 2019; new Taipei version, 2022; new Theatre Above version, Shanghai, 2022)
- Millennium Teahouse - 《千禧夜,我們說相聲》 (2000, China tour 2001, portion performed at CCTV's annual Chinese New Year Gala 2002 broadcast to 1 billion viewers, Theatre Above version 2017, on tour in China through 2018)
- Singapore Impromptu - 《新加坡即興》 (one-act, 2002)
- Mumble Jumble - 《亂民全講》 (2003, Theatre Above version 2015, and on tour in China through 2016)
- Sand and a Distant Star - 《在那遙遠的星球,一粒砂》 (2003, Theatre Above version 2015, and on tour in China through 2017)
- Total Woman - 《這一夜, Women說相聲》 (2005, on tour in China and US 2007-09)
- Shanghai Story - 《上海故事》 (2005, Shanghai Theatre Academy)
- Stories for the Dead - 《中间道》(in English, Stanford University, 2006)
- Like Shadows - 《如影隨行》 (2007, on tour in China 2008; Chinese version of Stories for the Dead; reading in English at the Lark Center, New York, 2016)
- Light Years - 《陪我看電視》 (2008, on tour in China and Taiwan through 2009)
- The Village - 《寶島一村》 (2008, China tour 2010-today, US tour 2011, 2014)
- Writing in Water - 《水中之書》 (in Cantonese, 2009, new Theatre Above version 2016)
- Happiness Lessons - 《快樂不用學》 (2010, Taiwan version of Writing in Water)
- Crosstalk Travelers - 《那一夜,在旅途中說相聲》 (2011, on tour in Taiwan and China through 2013, portion performed at Beijing TV's annual Chinese New Year Gala 2014 broadcast, Beijing version 2015, on tour in China through 2018)
- Dreamers - 《夢想家》 (book and lyrics, 2011)
- The Bridge - 《大橋上的對話與獨白》 (2012, Shanghai Theatre Academy)
- Dream Walk - 《梦游》 (2014, Wuzhen Theatre Festival)
- The Blue Horse - 《蓝马》 (2016, children's play, Shanghai and on tour in China, Taiwan version 2019)
- The Concealed Treasure - 《隐藏的宝藏》 (2018, Shanghai and on tour in China; new production, 2023 Taipei)
- The Whale Library - 《鲸鱼图书馆》 (2018, children's play, Shanghai and on tour in China)
- Nightwalk in the Chinese Garden - 《游园·流芳》 (2018, Huntington Chinese Garden, San Marino, California, joint production of the Huntington Library, Galleries, and Botanical Gardens, and CALARTS Center for New Performance)
- AGO - 《曾经如是》(2019, workshop performance, University of California, Berkeley, full Theatre Above production, 2019; Wuzhen Theatre Festival 2021)
- ONE ONE ZERO EIGHT - 《幺幺洞捌》 (2019, Theatre Above, Shanghai, and on tour in China; Wuzhen Theatre Festival 2019)
- River/Cloud - 《江雲之間》 (2021, National Theatre, Taipei; Wuzhen Theatre Festival 2024)
- The Long, Narrow Passageway -《長巷》(2023, Wuzhen Theatre Festival)
- Flower in the Mirror, Moon in the Water - 《鏡花水月》(2024, Huichang Theatre Village, China; Wuzhen Theatre Festival 2025)
- Descent - 《那一年，我們下凡》(2025, Taipei Performing Arts Center)
- Dreamwalk - 《夢遊》(2026, Xiuchun Theatre, Huichang Theatre Village, China)
- Twilight Sky - 《黃昏的天空》(2026, Taipei Performing Arts Center)

=== Plays, as director ===
- Footfalls: Beckett in the Ancient Chinese Garden, 6 plays by Samuel Beckett, translated by Stan Lai, 1988. Chinese-language premieres of Play, Footfalls, Ohio Impromptu, What Where, Come and Go performed in traditional garden setting, Taipei.
- The Seagull, by Anton Chekhov, translated by Stan Lai, 1990.
- The Interview, by Jean-Claude Van Italie, translated by Stan Lai, 1991.
- A Servant of Two Masters, by Carlo Goldoni, adapted by Stan Lai, 1995.
- Angels in America, Part I: Millennium Approaches, by Tony Kushner, translated by Stan Lai, 1996.
- The Spirits Play, by Kuo Pao Kun, 1998.
- The Comedy of Sex and Politics, adapted by Stan Lai from Carlo Goldoni's The Mistress of the Inn, 2001.
- Waiting for Godot, by Samuel Beckett, translated by Stan Lai, 2001.
- I Take Your Hands in Mine, by Carol Rocamora, adapted and translated by Stan Lai, 2014. Beijing and on tour in China; new version 2022, Theatre Above, Shanghai and on tour in China
- The Seagull, by Anton Chekhov, translated by Stan Lai, Beijing and on tour around China, 2014–16.
- Winter Journey, by Wan Fang, Beijing and on tour around China, 2015–17.
- Peking Man -《北京人》, by Cao Yu, Beijing and on tour around China, 2018–19.
- Idea House was Here - 《艾迪亚曾经在此》 (2023, theatre concert)
- Beckett in the Lai Family Mansion - 《貝克特在賴家老屋》, 5 plays of Samuel Beckett in Lai’s ancestral home (Huichang Theatre Village, 2025), in translations by Stan Lai.
- Beckett Above - 《貝克特在樓上》，5 plays of Samuel Beckett at Theatre Above, Shanghai, 2025) , in translations by Stan Lai.

=== Plays, as scenic designer ===
Director Stan Lai unless otherwise noted.

- Plucking Stars - 《摘星》 (1984)
- Open the Door, Sir! - 《先生,開個門！》(one-act, 1998, revived 2000)
- We Won’t Pay! We Won’t Pay - 《絕不付帳！》(Director Ismene Ting, 1998)
- Ménage à 13 - 《十三角關係》 (1999, Beijing production 2012 and on tour in China through 2016; new version 2022, Theatre Above, Shanghai and on tour in China)
- Lear and the 37-fold Path of a Bodhisattva - 菩薩之三十七種修行之李爾王 (one-act, 2000, revived 2001)
- Millennium Teahouse - 《千禧夜,我們說相聲》 (2000, China tour 2001, portion performed at CCTV's annual Chinese New Year Gala 2002 broadcast to 1 billion viewers, Theatre Above version 2017, on tour in China through 2018)
- Waiting for Godot, by Samuel Beckett, translated by Stan Lai, 2001.
- Dream Walk - 《梦游》 (2014, Wuzhen Theatre Festival)
- The Whale Library - 《鲸鱼图书馆》 (2018, children's play, Shanghai and on tour in China)
- ONE ONE ZERO EIGHT - 《幺幺洞捌》 (Theatre Above, 2019)
- A Dream Like a Dream - 《如梦之梦》(new versions, 2022)
- The Long, Narrow Passageway -《長巷》(2023, Wuzhen Theatre Festival)
- Flower in the Mirror, Moon in the Water - 《鏡花水月》(2024, Huichang Theatre Village, China)
- Dreamwalk - 《夢遊》(2026, Xiuchun Theatre, Huichang Theatre Village, China)
- Twilight Sky - 《黃昏的天空》(2026, Taipei Performing Arts Center)

=== Opera, as director ===
- Journey to the West, National Theatre, Taipei, 1987.
- Don Giovanni, National Concert Hall, Taipei, 2004.
- Cosi fan Tutte, National Concert Hall, Taipei, 2006.
- The Marriage of Figaro, National Concert Hall, Taipei, 2006.
- Dream of the Red Chamber, San Francisco Opera, 2016; Hong Kong Arts Festival, 2017; revived 2022, San Francisco Opera.

=== Film, as screenwriter and director ===
- The Peach Blossom Land - 暗戀桃花源 (1992 ; Silver Sakura Prize, 1992 Tokyo International Film Festival; Best Screenplay, Best Supporting Actor, 1992 Golden Horse Awards Taiwan; Caligari Prize, 1993 Berlin International Film Festival; Best Picture, Best Director, FIPRESCI prize, 1993 Singapore International Film Festival)
- The Red Lotus Society - 飛俠阿達 (1994, Toronto, New York, Tokyo Film Festivals)

=== Film, as producer ===
- A Brighter Summer Day - 《牯嶺街少年殺人事件》 (directed by Edward Yang, 1991)
- Shangri-La, Mon Amour - 《這兒是香格里拉》 (directed by Ismene Ting, 2009)

=== Television, as writer and director ===
- All in the Family are Human (1995–97, wrote and directed 244 episodes).
- All in Two Families are Human- 《我們兩家都是人》 (2004, wrote and directed 57 episodes).
- Rich House, Poor House - 《王子富愁记》 (2017, sit-com webseries on Youku).

=== Radio, as host ===
- Inspiration and Improvisation in Jazz, BCC, 1988–91.

=== Large scale events ===
- Opening and closing ceremonies, 2009 Deaflympics Games, Taipei. Creative Director.
- Opening Ceremony, 2010 Taipei International Flora Exposition. Artistic Director.
- 2011 Taiwan Lantern Festival. Miaoli, Taiwan. Creative Director.

=== Selected published work ===
- That Evening, We Performed Crosstalk. - 《那一夜,我們說相聲》 (in Chinese) Taipei: Crown Culture, 1986.
- Secret Love in Peach Blossom Land. - 《暗戀桃花源》 (in Chinese) Taipei: Crown Culture, 1986.
- Circle Story. - 《圓環物語》 (in Chinese) Taipei: Crown Culture, 1987.
- Old Times: Two Plays by Harold Pinter. - 《今之昔》 Translated by Stan Lai. (in Chinese) Taipei: Crown Culture, 1987.
- Journey to the West. - 《西遊記》 (in Chinese) Taipei: Crown Culture: 1988.
- The Island and the Other Shore. - 《回頭是彼岸》 (in Chinese) Taipei: Crown Culture: 1989.
- “The Peach Blossom Land.” Oxford Anthology of Contemporary Chinese Drama. Translated by Martha Cheung. Oxford: Oxford University Press, 1997.
- Stan Lai: Plays. 4 volumes. - 《賴聲川：劇場》 (16 plays, in Chinese) Taipei: Yuan-Zun Culture, 1999.
- A Dream Like A Dream. - 《如夢之夢》 (in Chinese) Taipei: Yuan-Liou Publishing, 2001.
- Stan Lai On Creativity. - 《賴聲川的創意學》 (in Chinese) Taipei: CommonWealth Magazine, 2006. Beijing: CITIC Press Group, 2006. Beijing: Guangxi Normal University Press, 2011.
- Comparisons: Plays by Stan Lai. - 《對照：賴聲川劇作》 (2 plays, in Chinese) Taipei: Chun-Sheng, 2005.
- Two Night Stands: Plays by Stan Lai. - 《兩夜情：賴聲川劇作》 (2 plays, in Chinese) Taipei: Chun-Sheng, 2005.
- Collages: Plays by Stan Lai. - 《拼貼：賴聲川劇作》 (2 plays, in Chinese) Taipei: Chun-Sheng, 2005.
- Millennium Voices: Plays by Stan Lai. - 《世紀之音：賴聲川劇作》 (2 plays， in Chinese) Taipei: Chun-Sheng, 2005.
- Mythical City: Plays by Stan Lai. - 《魔幻都市：賴聲川劇作》(2 plays， in Chinese) Taipei: Chun-Sheng, 2005.
- Plays by Stan Lai, (in Chinese) Vol. 1. - 《賴聲川劇場，第一集》(2 plays， in Chinese) Beijing: Oriental Press, 2007.
- Plays by Stan Lai, (in Chinese) Vol. 2. - 《賴聲川劇場，第二集》 (2 plays， in Chinese) Beijing: Oriental Press, 2007.
- The Village. - 《寶島一村》 (in Chinese, illustrated with photos) Taipei: Performing Arts Review, 2011.
- A Dream Like A Dream. - 《如夢之夢》 (in Chinese, illustrated with photos) Taipei: Performing Arts Review, 2013.
- Major Stan Lai Plays. - 《賴聲川劇作集》(in Chinese) 9 volumes. Beijing: CITIC Press Group, 2019.
- Major Stan Lai Plays. - 《賴聲川劇作集》(in Chinese) 7 volumes. Beijing: CITIC Press Group, 2020.
- Selected Plays of Stan Lai. 3 vols, 12 plays, Translated by Stan Lai, Edited by Lissa Tyler Renaud, University of Michigan Press, 2022.
- Creativitry: Asia’s Iconic Playwright Reveals the Art of Creativity. New York, London and New Delhi: Anthem Press, 2025.

=== Translations of Lai's work into English and other languages ===
- Pining in Peach Blossom Land, in An Oxford Anthology of Contemporary Chinese Drama, edited by Martha P.Y. Cheung and Jane Lai, translated by Martha P.Y. Cheung. Oxford University Press, 1997.
- Secret Love in Peach Blossom Land, in The Columbia Anthology of Modern Chinese Drama, edited by Xiaomei Chen, translated by Stan Lai. Columbia University Press, 2010.
- Selected Plays of Stan Lai, Volume 1: Secret Love in Peach Blossom Land and Other Plays. Translated by Stan Lai, Edited by Lissa Tyler Renaud, University of Michigan Press, 2022. Contains Secret Love in Peach Blossom Land, Look Who's Cross-talking Tonight, The Island and the Other Shore, I Me She Him and Ménage à 13.
- Selected Plays of Stan Lai, Volume 2: The Village and Other Plays. Translated by Stan Lai, Edited by Lissa Tyler Renaud, University of Michigan Press, 2022. Contains Millennium Teahouse, Sand on a Distant Star, Like Shadows, The Village and Writing in Water.
- Selected Plays of Stan Lai, Volume 3: A Dream Like a Dream and AGO. Translated by Stan Lai, Edited by Lissa Tyler Renaud, University of Michigan Press, 2022. Contains A Dream Like a Dream and AGO.

=== Translations ===
- Harold Pinter, Old Times: Two Plays by Harold Pinter. Taipei: Crown Culture, 1987.
- Matthieu Ricard, The Monk and the Philosopher. Taipei: Prophet Press, 1999.
- Dario Fo, Accidental Death of an Anarchist. Taipei: Tonsan, 2001.
- Matthieu Ricard, The Life of Dilgo Khyentse. Taipei: Oak Tree Publishing, 2001.
- Dilgo Khyentse, Enlightened Courage: An Explanation of Atisha’s Seven Point Mind Training. Taipei: Oak Tree Publishing, 2005.
- Matthieu Ricard, Happiness: A Guide to Developing Life’s Most Important Skill. Taipei: CommonWealth Magazine, 2007.
- Anton Chekhov, The Seagull. in New Drama. Vol. 1, Beijing, 2015, pp 49-77.

=== Full Length Works Written about Stan Lai ===
- Tao, Qingmei and Hou Suyi. In the Moment: The Theatre of Stan Lai. 陶慶梅、侯淑怡作，《剎那中：賴聲川的劇場藝術》台北：中國時報， Taipei: China Times Press, 2003.
- He, Mingyan. Magnificence of the Seven-Tiered Pagoda: The Multi-level Aesthetics of Stan Lai's Theatre Works. 何明燕：《七宝楼台的光华：赖声川舞台剧的多重美学特征》上海三联书局， Sanlian Press, Shanghai, 2014.
- Hu, Minghua. Stan Lai's Plays from the Perspective of Cultural Integration. 胡明华：《文化融合视野中的赖声川戏剧》中国戏剧出版社， China Drama Press, Beijing, 2020.

=== Academic Conferences about Stan Lai ===
- “International Conference on Lai Sheng-chuan.” October 2006, Taipei, Taiwan.
- “The International Symposium on Stan Lai’s Theatre Studies.” 首届赖声川戏剧作品研究国际学术研讨会, Sept 2022, Nanjing, China.

=== Exhibitions ===
- Installation, "China Journey," Hong Kong Arts Centre, 1998.
- Monologue for Anna May Wong Exhibit, Museum of Chinese in America, New York, 2008.
- "No Need for a Reason -- Photographs of Stan Lai, Yu Jian, Duan Zhengqu and Zhang Yadong." 无需理由——赖声川 于坚 段正渠 张亚东作品展, 中国摄影画廊首展 Photo Exhibition at China Photography Exhibition Hall, Beijing 2019.
- "Secret Space of the Artist: International Director Stan Lai." 「藝術家的創作角落：賴聲川創作空間大揭秘」, Exhibition at National Theatre Library, Taipei, 2021.
- "Image/Theatre/Life: Stan Lai's Creativity and Art." 剧相人生：赖声川创作艺术展, Exhibition at Eslite Bookstore, Suzhou, China 2021. Tour to Beijing, 2022, and Huichang, China 2024.

== Awards and honors ==
Lai has been the recipient of Taiwan’s highest award for the arts, the National Arts Award, twice - 1988 and 2001, among many other awards, including being inducted into the Chinese Theatre Hall of Fame in 2007. His films have won international awards at the Berlin, Tokyo and Singapore International Festivals. In 2007, Lai was named Creative Person of the Year by Innovation China Awards, Entrepreneur of the Year by EY, and received the 11th Taipei Cultural Award presented by then Mayor of Taipei Hau Lung-pin. In 2010, he was chosen by Newsweek China as Man of the Year in the field of Culture and was named Person of the Year at the One Drama Awards in Shanghai. In 2011, he received the Grand Cordon, Order of Brilliant Star from the Presidential Office, the highest civilian decoration for Taiwan. Also in 2011, Lai won Best Director at the One Drama Awards. In 2013 Lai won Annual Creativity Grand Prize presented by the Beijing News. In June 2019, Lai became the first Chinese theatre professional to be inducted into the Sibiu Walk of Fame at the Sibiu International Theatre Festival, Romania's pre-eminent performing arts event. In the ceremony organised for the event, Lai's award was presented by theatre critic Octavian Saiu.
