= Ku Pao-ming =

Taiwanese actor and comedian (1950–2022)

Ku Pao-ming (Chinese: 顧寶明; Pe̍h-ōe-jī: Kò͘ Pó-bêng; 8 April 1950 – 19 March 2022) was a Taiwanese actor and comedian.

He appeared with the Godot Theater Company in Art (2003), alongside Chin Shih-chieh and Lee Li-chun, as well as The Apartment (2006). Ku also performed in Legitimate Crimes (2009) with the Ping-Fong Acting Troupe and its founder Hugh Lee.

Ku died of congestive heart failure on 19 March 2022, at the age of 71.

== Selected filmography ==
- Terrorizers (1986)
- The Book and the Sword (1992)
- Secret Love for the Peach Blossom Spring (1992)
- Flying Dagger (1993)
- The Great Conqueror's Concubine (1994)
- The Heaven Sword and Dragon Saber (1994)
- Tian Di (1994)
- Wolves Cry Under the Moon (1997)
- The Personals (1998)
- Romance of the White Haired Maiden (1999)
- Treasure Venture (2000)
- Art (2003)
- Romantic Princess (2007)
- Hot Shot (2008)
- Letter 1949 (2008)
- Down with Love (2010)
- Sunny Girl (2011)
- Prince William (2014)
- The Village of No Return (2017)
- End of Summer (2017)
