= Michelle Krusiec =

American actress (born 1974)

- 楊雅慧
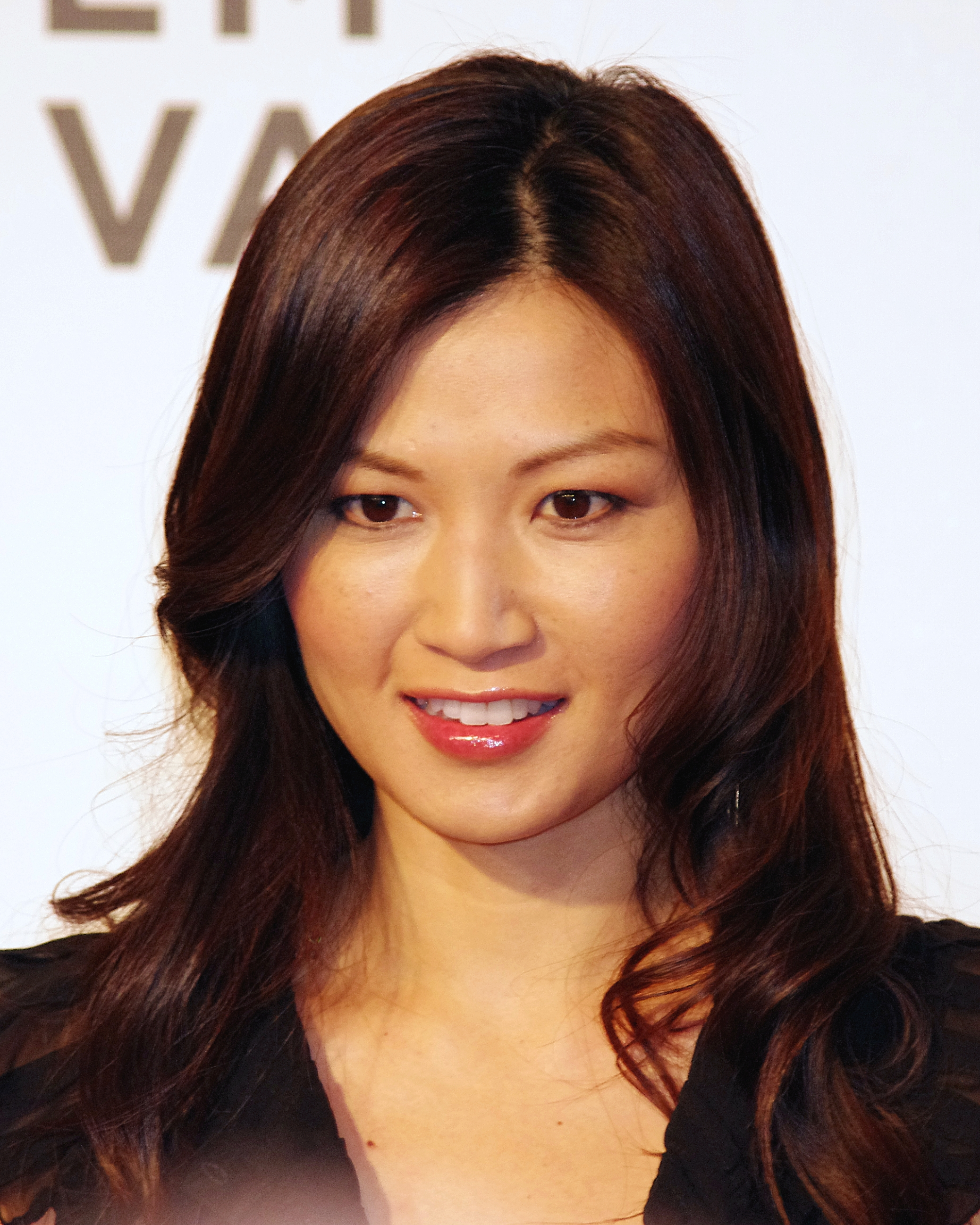
- Krusiec at the 2012 Tribeca Film Festival premiere of Knife Fight
- Born: Ya-Huei Yang; October 2, 1974 (age 52); Taiwan
- Education: Virginia Tech (BA); University of Oxford
- Occupations: Actress, writer, producer
- Years active: 1986–present

Chinese name
- Traditional Chinese: 楊雅慧
- Simplified Chinese: 杨雅慧
Transcriptions
Standard Mandarin
- Hanyu Pinyin: Yáng Yǎhuì
- Website: www.michellekrusiec.com

Michelle Jacqueline Krusiec (born Ya-Huei Yang; Chinese: 楊雅慧; pinyin: Yáng Yǎhuì; October 2, 1974) is an American actress, writer and producer.

== Early life and education ==
Krusiec was born in Taiwan. She was adopted at age five and raised in Virginia Beach, Virginia by her father's elder sister, who had married a Polish American, longtime U.S. Navy officer Carl Andrew Krusiec. Her adoptive father renamed her Michelle Jacqueline because he wanted her to have a French name.

Krusiec studied theater at Virginia Polytechnic Institute and State University (Virginia Tech), graduating with a B.A. She also studied Shakespeare and women's literature at the University of Oxford on a scholarship.

== Career ==
=== Television and voicework ===
Krusiec was recruited to be one of six globe-trotting travel reporters for the Discovery Channel series Travelers in 1996. She traveled to over 50 different locations on the show. Krusiec played the 18-year-old Molly O'Brien in the Star Trek: Deep Space Nine episode "Time's Orphan". She co-starred in the NBC Saturday morning sitcom One World and played the role of Exquisite Woo on Popular. She played Mei-Ling Hwa Darling, one of the Darling family's daughters-in-law, in ABC's dramedy, Dirty Sexy Money. She appeared in The Mind of the Married Man as Sachiko, a massage parlor employee. She had a recurring role as "Nadine Park" on Season 4 of Fox's Fringe, and has also appeared on TV shows such as NBC's Community as "Wu Mei", a love interest of Chevy Chase's character, Pierce Hawthorne, General Hospital as Attorney Grace Yang, The Secret Life of the American Teenager as Emily, Touch as Lanny Cheong, Nip/Tuck as Mei, CSI: Miami as Susan Lee, CSI: NY as Lisa Kim, NCIS, Grey's Anatomy, Weeds, Without a Trace, Cold Case as Kara Dhiet (2004), Monk as Maria, ER as Tong-Ye, and Titus as recurring character Nancy.

In 2020, Krusiec played Anna May Wong in Ryan Murphy's Netflix series, Hollywood.

Krusiec provided various voices for multiple episodes of Seth MacFarlane's animated series American Dad!.

=== Film ===
Krusiec was a Best Actress nominee in the Golden Horse Film Festival for her performance in an American independent film Saving Face (2005), written and directed by Alice Wu, in which she plays a Chinese American surgeon named Wilhelmina Pang ("Wil") juggling the demands of her girlfriend, Vivian Shing (played by Lynn Chen) and pregnant mother (played by Joan Chen). Krusiec appeared in a number of feature films including Knife Fight as Shannon, Sunset Stories as Nova, Relative Insanity as Marsha, Far North as Anja, the daughter of Michelle Yeoh's character, What Happens in Vegas as Chong, Cameron Diaz's character's competitive co-worker, Dumb and Dumberer as Cindy, The River Murders as Sung Li opposite Ray Liotta, Christian Slater, and Ving Rhames, Daddy Day Care as the English teacher, Take Me Home as Suzanne, Shuffle as Kevin's Mother, and independent film projects including Tanuj Chopra's Nice Girls Crew alongside Lynn Chen and Sheetal Sheth, Shawn Chou's Tomato and Eggs opposite Keiko Agena and Sab Shimono, and Erin Li's L.A. Coffin School opposite Elizabeth Sung and Megan Lee.

=== Theater ===
Krusiec wrote, directed, and performed a one-woman show entitled "Made in Taiwan" that premiered in Los Angeles and in New York at the New York International Fringe Festival of Theater, among other venues. She has received funding from Visual Communications to develop the play into a feature film.

Krusiec toured with the cast of David Henry Hwang's play, Chinglish, in the role of Xi Yian. The first stop of the play was at the Berkeley Repertory Theatre, and then the South Coast Repertory (as the play is a joint production between the two theaters), and then to the Hong Kong Arts Festival in Hong Kong. The production of the play is directed by two-time Obie winner Leigh Silverman.

In 2018, Krusiec starred in The Public Theatre's production of Hansol Jung's play Wild Goose Dreams, in the co-leading role of Yoo Nanhee.

== Filmography ==
=== Film ===
Year	Title	Role	Notes
1995	Nixon	Student #2	
2000	For the Cause	Layton	
2001	Pursuit of Happiness	Miko	
2002	Pumpkin	Anne Chung	
2002	Sweet Home Alabama	Pan	
2002	Tomato and Eggs	Evelyn Wang	Short
2003	Daddy Day Care	English Teacher	
2003	Dumb and Dumberer: When Harry Met Lloyd	Cindy "Ching-Chong"	
2003	Duplex	Dr. Kang	
2004	Best Actress	Darla Hennings	Short
2004	Saving Face	Wilhelmina 'Wil' Pang	
2005	Cursed	Nosebleed Co-Worker	
2007	Nanking	Yang Shu Ling	
2007	Far North	Anja	
2008	Henry Poole Is Here	Young Nurse	
2008	What Happens in Vegas	Chong	
2010	Zoom Hunting	Cheating Man's Wife	
2011	Take Me Home	Suzanne	
2011	The River Murders	Sung Li	
2012	Knife Fight	Shannon Haung	
2013	Four of Hearts	Christy	
2015	The Invitation	Gina	
2017	20 Weeks	Dr. Chen	
2022	They Live in the Grey	Claire	
2023	A Million Miles Away	Miss Young	
2023	Float	Rachel	

=== Television ===
Year	Title	Role	Notes
1992	CBS Schoolbreak Special	Lisa	Episode: "Sexual Considerations"
1996	Travelers	Host	
1998	Star Trek: Deep Space Nine	Older Molly O'Brien	Episode: "Time's Orphan"
1998–2001	One World	Sui Blake	3 seasons
1999	Popular	Exquisite Woo	2 episodes
2000	Providence	Dong-Lu	Episode: "The Storm"
2000–2002	Titus	Nancy	6 episodes
2001	Special Unit 2	Parasite	Episode: "The Grain"
2001	The Mind of the Married Man	Sushiko, Japanese masseuse	Episode: "The God of Marriage"
2002	ER	Tong-Ye	Episode: "Tell Me Where It Hurts"
2003	Monk	Maria	Episode: "Mr. Monk and the Sleeping Suspect"
2003–2005	Without a Trace	Ariel - Hostess / Call Girl	2 episodes
2004	Cold Case	Kara Dhiet	Episode: "Who's Your Daddy"
2005	Weeds	Helen Chin	Episode: "Free Goat"
2005	Grey's Anatomy	Anna Chue	Episode: "Bring the Pain"
2005	NCIS	Maya	Episode: "Under Covers"
2006	Standoff	Kim Lau	Episode: "Shanghai'd"
2007–2009	Dirty Sexy Money	Mei Ling Hwa Darling	5 episodes
2008	My Own Worst Enemy	Paula / Ellen	Episode: "That Is Not My Son"
2009	CSI: NY	Lisa Kim	Episode: "Blacklist"
2010	CSI: Miami	Susan Lee	Episode: "Die by the Sword"
2011	Community	Wu Mei	Episode: "Competitive Wine Tasting"
2011–2012	Fringe	Nadine Park	3 episodes
2012	Touch	Lanny Cheong	Episode: "Lost & Found"
2012–2013	Nice Girls Crew	Geraldine	10 episodes
2014	Getting On	Andrea Conrad	2 episodes
2016	Hawaii Five-0	Michelle Shioma	3 episodes
2018	Supergirl	Natalie Hawkings	Episode: "Parasite Lost"
2020	Hollywood	Anna May Wong	4 episodes

=== Video game ===
Year	Title	Role	Notes
2003	Tenchu: Wrath of Heaven	Ayame	English Dub
