= Entangling Love in Shanghai =

- Poster
- Also known as
- Traditional Chinese: 儂本多情
- Simplified Chinese: 侬本多情
- Literal meaning: You Are Sentimental at Heart
- Hanyu Pinyin: Nóng Běn Duō Qíng
- Written by: Bo Hua
- Directed by: Raymond Lee; Yu Mang San
- Starring: Alyssa Chia; Huang Shao-chi; Liao Xiaoqin; Sun Xing; He Saifei; Chen Long; Xu Rongzhen; Gao Xin; Liu Yanyan
- Opening theme: "Duo Qing" (多情) performed by Freya Lim
- Ending theme: "Buneng Yongbao de Tiankong" (不能擁抱的天空) performed by Dr. Q and Alex Lee
- Country of origin: China
- No. of episodes: 40

Production
- Producer: Zhang Linlin
- Running time: 45 minutes

Original release
- Network: Shanghai Television
- Release: January 4, 2010

Related
- Love Is Payable (1997)

Entangling Love in Shanghai is a 2010 Chinese television series with 40 episodes. It is a remake of the 1997 series Love Is Payable.

== Cast ==
- Alyssa Chia as Xiangxue'er
- Huang Shao-chi as Bai Lang
- Liao Xiaoqin as Bai Ping
- Sun Xing as Qiao Xiannong
- Gao Xin as Zhang Guiting
- Chen Long as Ma Xianliang
- Feng Shaofeng as Chen Congming
- He Saifei as Hu Ying
- Xu Rongzhen as Liao Wanzhen
- Yu Hongliang as Han Dong
- Xu Qiwen as Yang Ming
- Bi Hanwen as Da Mi
- Liu Yanyan as Lu Manli

== Broadcast ==
Country	Known as	First Aired on	Debut date
China	儂本多情	Shanghai Television	January 4, 2010
Vietnam	Phận Má Hồng	Vietnam Television	January 7, 2010
Taiwan	儂本多情	Azio TV	June 4, 2010
Cambodia	មានស្នេហ៍តែគ្មាននិស្ស័យ	?	
