= Parking (2008 film) =

- Film poster
- Traditional Chinese: 停車
- Simplified Chinese: 停车
- Hanyu Pinyin: Tíngchē
- Directed by: Chung Mong-Hong
- Written by: Chung Mong-Hong
- Produced by: Hsu Chaohui; Tseng Shao-chien
- Starring: Chang Chen; Gwei Lun-mei; Leon Dai; Chapman To; Jack Kao; Peggy Tseng; Lin Kai-jung
- Cinematography: Chung Mong-Hong
- Edited by: Lo Shih-Jing
- Music by: An Dong
- Production company: Cream Film Production
- Release date: November 28, 2008 (Taiwan)
- Running time: 106 minutes
- Country: Taiwan
- Language: Mandarin

Parking (Chinese: 停車; pinyin: Tíngchē) is a 2008 Taiwanese film directed and written by Chung Mong-Hong.

== Synopsis ==
On Mother's Day in Taipei, Chen-Mo (Chang Chen) makes a dinner date with his wife (Gwei Lun-mei), hoping to improve their estranged relationship. While he is buying a cake on his way home, a car double-parks next to his, preventing his exit. For the entire night, Chen-Mo searches for the owner of the car and encounters a succession of strange events and eccentric characters: an old couple living with their precocious granddaughter who have lost their only son; a one-armed barbershop owner cooking fish-head soup; a mainland Chinese prostitute trying to escape her pimp’s cruel clutches; and a Hong-Kong tailor embroiled in debt and captured by underground loan sharks.

== Cast ==
- Chang Chen as Chen Mo
- Gwei Lun-mei as Chen Mo's Wife
- Leon Dai as Pimp
- Chapman To as Tailor
- Jack Kao as Barber
- Peggy Tseng as Hooker
- Tou Chung-hua as Gang Leader
- Lai-Yin Yang
- Lin Kai-jung as Barber's Granddaughter
- Holger Chen as Gang Member

== Festivals ==
- Cannes Film Festival 2008 – Un Certain Regard
- Montreal World Film Festival 2008
- Bangkok International Film Festival 2008
- Vancouver International Film Festival 2008
- Pusan International Film Festival 2008
- Hong Kong Asian Film Festival 2008
- Stockholm International Film Festival 2008
- Thessaloniki International Film Festival 2008
- Taipei Golden Horse Film Festival 2008 – Opening Film
- !f Istanbul International Independent Film Festival 2009
- Spokane International Film Festival 2009
- 2009 Adelaide Film Festival
- Osaka Asian Film Festival 2009
- Bradford International Film Festival 2009
- Taiwan London Cinefest 2009
- Barcelona Asian Film Festival
- Silk Screen Film Festival 2009
- Wisconsin Film Festival 2011

== Awards ==
- Golden Horse Award, Best Art Direction – FIPRESCI Critics Award: Taipei Golden Horse Film Festival 2008
- Best New Talent - Audience Favourite Film: Hong Kong Asian Film Festival 2008

== See also ==
- List of films set around Mother's Day
