= Love Is Payable =

- Vietnamese VHS cover
- Also known as
- Traditional Chinese: 儂本多情
- Simplified Chinese: 侬本多情
- Literal meaning: You Are Sentimental at Heart
- Hanyu Pinyin: Nóng Běn Duō Qíng
- Written by: Bo Hua
- Directed by: Raymond Lee; Lai Shui-ching; Lo Leun Seung
- Starring: Steve Ma; Carina Lau; Leanne Liu; Lee Li-chun; Song Chunli; Sun Xing; Angus Tung; Lawrence Ng; Lu Wen
- Opening theme: "Duo Qing Ren" (多情人) performed by Mindy Quah
- Ending theme: "Ditu" (地圖) performed by Chiang Yu-heng
- Composer: Chen Ming-chang
- Countries of origin: Taiwan; China
- Original language: Mandarin
- No. of episodes: 40

Production
- Producer: Young Pei-pei
- Cinematography: Lin Ho-lung; Hsiao Bi-tsun
- Running time: 45 minutes
- Production companies: Young Pei-pei Studio; Tianjin Television

Original release
- Network: Formosa Television
- Release: July 23, 1997

Related
- Entangling Love in Shanghai (2010)

Love Is Payable is a 1997 Chinese-language period romance television series produced by Young Pei-pei, set in the Shanghai International Settlement during the Second Sino-Japanese War (which was policed by British and Americans before 1941 even after Shanghai fell to the Japanese in 1937). The series was filmed in Tianjin and Shanghai and first broadcast on Taiwan's Formosa Television.

Originally, Anita Mui was the first choice to play Xiangxue'er, and Stephen Chow was the first choice for the role of Bai Lang. However, they were unavailable, so Carina Lau and Steven Ma were cast instead.

In 2010, Young Pei-pei produced a remake, titled Entangling Love in Shanghai in English (the Chinese title remains the same).

== Cast ==
- Carina Lau as Xiangxue'er
- Steve Ma as Bai Lang
- Leanne Liu as Bai Ping
- Lee Li-chun as Qiao Xiannong
- Lawrence Ng as Zhang Guiting
- Sun Xing as Ma Xianliang
- Angus Tung as Chen Congming
- Song Chunli as Hu Ying
- Lu Wen as Liao Wanzhen
- Yue Yueli as Han Dong
- Chen Zihan as Yang Ming
- Doze Niu as Da Mi
- Chu Zhong-heng as Rong San
- Dong Xiaoyan

== Awards and nominations ==
#	Award	Category	Individual	Result
34th	Golden Bell Awards	Best Television Series		Nominated
34th	Golden Bell Awards	Best Supporting Actor	Lee Li-chun	Nominated
34th	Golden Bell Awards	Best Sound Effect	Hu Lianzhong, Huang Gaoping	Nominated
34th	Golden Bell Awards	Best Lightning	Lin Helong, Chen Zelin	Nominated
