= State of Divinity (2000 TV series) =

2000 Taiwanese TV series

- DVD box art
- Also known as: The Smiling, Proud Wanderer
- 笑傲江湖
- Genre: Wuxia
- Based on: The Smiling, Proud Wanderer by Jin Yong
- Starring: Richie Ren; Anita Yuen
- Opening theme: "Can't Die" (死不了) by Richie Ren
- Ending theme: "Heaven's Edge" (天涯) by Richie Ren
- Country of origin: Taiwan
- Original language: Mandarin
- No. of episodes: 52

Production
- Producer: Young Pei-pei
- Production location: Taiwan
- Running time: ≈45 minutes per episode

Original release
- Network: CTV
- Release: 2000

State of Divinity (笑傲江湖) is a Taiwanese wuxia television series adapted from the novel The Smiling, Proud Wanderer by Jin Yong. Starring Richie Ren and Anita Yuen, the series was first broadcast on CTV in 2000.

== Cast ==
- Richie Ren as Linghu Chong
- Anita Yuen as Ren Yingying
- Vivian Chen as Yue Lingshan
- Leanne Liu as Dongfang Bubai
- David Chiang as Qu Yang
- Norman Chui as Xiang Wentian
- Chang Fu-chien as Liu Zhengfeng
- Ku Kuan-chung as Zuo Lengshan
- Lee Li-chun as Ren Woxing
- Ma Chi-chin as Dingyi
- Sun Xing as Tian Boguang
- Chu Chung-heng as Lu Dayou
- Tsai Tsan-te as Yilin
- Song Ta-ming as Lin Pingzhi
- Li Chih-hsi as Yang Lianting
- Tieh Meng-chiu as Lüzhuweng
- Chang Li-wei as Peach Flower Immortal
- Yu Wen-chung as Feng Qingyang
- Chen Baoguo as Lin Zhennan
- Yue Yaoli as Yue Buqun
- Liu Li-li as Ning Zhongze
- Pan Hung as Yu Canghai
- Chen Zihan as Lan Fenghuang
- Tu Peng as Lao Denuo
- Liu Jia as Lin Zhennan's wife
- Ch'ang Ju-yen as Dingxian
- K'ung Ching-shan as Peach Leaf Immortal
- Liu Ch'ang-sheng as Fangzheng
- Hsia Te-sheng as Elder Monk
- Yuen Hung-chi as Shangguan Yun
- Chao Wen-liang as Huang Zhonggong
- Hou Chun as Heibaizi
- Tsao Pao-yeh as Tubiweng
- Wu Chen-su as Danqingsheng
- He Chiang as Mu Gaofeng
- Wang Chien-hung as Lan Yi
- Li Hung-wei as Zhong Zhen
- Sun Nien-pin as Adviser Yi
- Lo Cheng-yen as Wang Yuanba
- Chao Kai as Wang Jiajun
- Fu Hung-chin as Zu Qianqiu
- Tang Yung-te as Laotouzi
- Wang Piao as Long-haired Monk
- Yen Mei as Single-eyed Woman
- Fu Hui as You Xun
