= Lee Li-chun =

Taiwanese actor

Lee Li-chun (Chinese: 李立群; Pe̍h-ōe-jī: Lí Li̍p-kûn; born 2 May 1952) is a Taiwanese actor and xiangsheng performer.

== Career ==
Lee is known for his work on stage with Godot Theater Company, starring in Art alongside Chin Shih-chieh and Ku Pao-ming in 2003. In 2005, Lee took the lead role in Godot's My First Wives. Lee and Chin shared the stage for Godot's 2008 production Othello. The performance premiered in Kaohsiung on 30 August 2008, and traveled across the island, to Hsinchu, Tainan, and Taipei, to mark Godot's twentieth anniversary. Lee remained on the cast as the show's run stretched into January 2009. Later that year, Lee starred in Godot's adaption of Fools.

== Selected filmography ==
- Terrorizers (1986)
- Secret Love for the Peach Blossom Spring (1992)
- Love Is Payable (1997)
- State of Divinity (2000 TV series) (2000)
- Art (2003)
- Othello (2008–2009)
- Fools (2009)
- The Qin Empire (TV series) (2009)
- Young Sherlock (2014)
- Goodbye Mr. Loser (2015)
- The Sleuth of the Ming Dynasty (2020)
