= Zoom Hunting =

- Directed by: Cho Li
- Written by: Li Cho, Kelly Yuan-Ling Yang
- Starring: Chun-Ning Chang, Zhu Zhi-Ying
- Production company: Ocean Deep Films
- Release date: April 16, 2010
- Running time: 87 minutes
- Country: Taiwan
- Language: Mandarin

Zoom Hunting (獵豔) is a 2010 Taiwanese thriller film directed by Cho Li. The film stars Janine Chang and Jacqueline Zhu as two sisters who become voyeurs of a couple engaged in a heated moment near a window. When they discover that the couple is married, they become obsessed with them and investigate their lives.

The film is a mystery drama that explores voyeurism, obsession, and the dangers of prying into other people's lives.

== Cast ==
- Janine Chang as Yang Ruyi
- Jacqueline Zhu as Yang Ruxing
- Sheng-hao Wen as Mr. Chen
- Heng-yin Chuo as Mr. Chen's mistress
- Michelle Krusiec as Mrs. Chen
- Shih-chieh Chin - Doorman
- Jack Kao - Editor
- Chien-wei Huang as the police officer

== Plot ==
In the vibrant heart of Taipei, two sisters, Yang Ruyi, a lively fashion photographer, and Yang Ruxing, a reclusive novelist, live in a comfortable apartment. One day, Ruyi captures a steamy encounter between a neighboring married couple, Mr. and Mrs. Chen, using her long-range camera lens. She is intrigued by the illicit affair and shares her discovery with Ruxing, who struggles to find inspiration for her novel. The sisters start a voyeuristic adventure in which they grow curious about their neighbors' troubled relationship. Ruxing, who seeks inspiration for her novel, begins to chronicle the couple's interactions and later secretly incorporates their neighbor's story into her novel. As her involvement in the Chen's lives deepens, Ruyi grows suspicious of her.

One day, Ruyi witnesses a heated argument between the Chens until a shadowy figure enters their apartment, and a scream pierces the night. Ruyi is shaken by the unsettling incident and rushes to the scene, only to find the Chens have mysteriously vanished and their apartment is empty.

Ruyi's suspicions about her sister intensify until she uncovers Ruxing's secret novel, revealing her intimate knowledge of the Chens' lives and her growing obsession with their story. Ruyi confronts Ruxing about her clandestine involvement, questioning her motives and the extent of her responsibility in the Chens' disappearance, leading to rising tension between the sisters.

Ruyi digs deeper until she discovers that the Chens were involved in a complex web of illegal relationships and financial deals, that one of these shady business deals went wrong, that the mysterious figure Ruyi witnessed entering their apartment is a ruthless businessman seeking revenge, and that he is responsible for their disappearance.

Ruyi's suspicions about her sister are confirmed when her investigation leads her to a secret meeting between the businessman and Ruxing. There, she overhears a plot to eliminate the Chens permanently. Realizing the danger her sister is in, Ruyi intervenes, but finds it's too late. The businessman has already set his plan in motion.

Ruyi confronts the businessman and his men in a climactic confrontation, determined to protect her sister and expose the truth. A violent struggle ensues, and Ruyi finds herself facing off against the businessman's ruthless henchmen. With quick wit and determination, Ruyi turns the tables, saving her sister and bringing the perpetrators to justice.

== Reception ==
The film was shown at the following festivals:

- 2010 (15th) Pusan International Film Festival - October 7–15 - A Window on Asian Cinema
- 2010 (23rd) Tokyo International Film Festival - October 23–31 - Taiwanese Cinema Renaissance
