= 30th Golden Horse Awards =

Award ceremony for Chinese-language films of 1992 and 1993

- Date: December 4, 1993
- Site: Sun Yat-sen Memorial Hall, Taipei, Taiwan
- Hosted by: Sun Yueh and Fang Fang-fang
- Preshow hosts: Isabel Kao
- Organized by: Taipei Golden Horse Film Festival Executive Committee

Highlights
- Best Feature Film: The Wedding Banquet
- Best Director: Ang Lee; The Wedding Banquet
- Best Actor: Jackie Chan; Crime Story
- Best Actress: Carrie Ng; Remains of a Woman
- Most awards: The Wedding Banquet (5)
- Most nominations: Temptation of a Monk (7)

Television in Taiwan
- Channel: CTS

The 30th Golden Horse Awards (Mandarin:第30屆金馬獎) took place on December 4, 1993 at the Sun Yat-sen Memorial Hall in Taipei, Taiwan.

== Winners and nominees ==
Winners are listed first and highlighted in boldface.

**Best Feature Film**: **The Wedding Banquet**; Cageman; Autumn Moon; Five Girls and a Rope; End of the Road; The Puppetmaster	**Best Documentary Film**: **Voice of Orchid Island**; Black-faced Spoonbill in Taiwan (1992 spring ~ 1993 winter); The Beautician
**Best Director**: **Ang Lee — The Wedding Banquet**; Clara Law — Autumn Moon; Derek Yee — C'est la vie, mon chéri; Jacob Cheung — Cageman	**Best Leading Actor**: **Jackie Chan — Crime Story**; Wu Hsing-kuo — Temptation of a Monk; Kent Cheng — Crime Story; Tony Leung Ka-fai — A Roof with a View
**Best Leading Actress**: **Carrie Ng — Remains of a Woman**; Monica Lu — 18; Anita Yuen — C'est la vie, mon chéri; Veronica Yip — A Roof with a View	**Best Supporting Actor**: **Sihung Lung — The Wedding Banquet**; Paul Chun — C'est la vie, mon chéri; Ng Man-tat — End of the Road; Chang Shih — Five Girls and a Rope
**Best Supporting Actress**: **Gua Ah-leh — The Wedding Banquet**; Fung Bo-bo — C'est la vie, mon chéri; Deanie Ip — Murder; Yang Chieh-mei — Five Girls and a Rope	**Best Original Screenplay**: **Neil Peng, Ang Lee — The Wedding Banquet**; Eddie Ling-Ching Fong — Autumn Moon; Derek Yee — C'est la vie, mon chéri; Eddie Ling-Ching Fong, Pik Wah Lee — Temptation of a Monk
**Best Cinematography**: **Mark Lee Ping-bin — The Puppetmaster**; Andrew Lesnie — Temptation of a Monk; Peter Pau — The Bride with White Hair; Ho Ping — 18	**Best Film Editing**: **Cheung Yiu-chung — Fong Sai-yuk**; Angie Lam — Tai Chi Master; Cheung Yiu-chung — Crime Story; Ang Lee — The Wedding Banquet
**Best Adapted Screenplay**: **David Hu, Tang Pik-yin, Jason Lam Kee-to, Ronny Yu — The Bride with White Hair**; Ho Ping, Kuo Cheng — 18; Lau Chia Hua, Xiao Mao, Yeh Hung-we — Five Girls and a Rope; Tsai Der-ming, Chou De-yung — Green, Green Leaves of Home	**Audience Choice Award**: **The Wedding Banquet**
**Jury's Special Award -** **Honourable Animation Production Award**: **Away A Way**	**Lifetime Achievement Award**: **Wong Cheuk-hon**
