= Where the Wind Settles =

- Film poster
- Traditional Chinese: 風中家族
- Simplified Chinese: 风中家族
- Literal meaning: The Family in the Wind
- Hanyu Pinyin: Fēng Zhōng Jiāzú
- Directed by: Wang Toon
- Written by: Kuo Cheng; Carol Li; Lin Chi-shiang; Wu Jing
- Produced by: Huang Chih-ming; Tang Tsai-yang
- Starring: Tony Yang; Mason Lee; Bea Hayden; Amber Kuo; Ko Chia-yen; George Hu; Li Xiaochuan; Zou Xuanqi
- Music by: Peng Yen-kai
- Production company: Renaissance Film
- Release dates: June 26, 2015 (P.R. China); July 24, 2015 (Taiwan)
- Running time: 126 minutes
- Country: Taiwan
- Languages: Mandarin; some Taiwanese Hokkien, Shanghainese

Where the Wind Settles is a 2015 Taiwanese historical period film directed by Wang Toon. Spanning the years from 1949 to 2010, the film chronicles the lives of several mainland Chinese people who resettled in Taiwan near the end of the Chinese Civil War.

== Plot ==
During the last phase of the Huaihai Campaign in 1949, injured Republic of China Army captain Sheng Peng (Tony Yang) and subordinate soldiers Huang Te-shun (Li Xiaochuan) and Fan Chung-yueh (George Hu) retreat when it becomes clear the battle is irretrievably lost. As they trek across the countryside in northern Jiangsu, they encounter an abandoned boy named "Dog Two" (Zou Xuanqi), whom they carry along. They rejoin the nationalist troops and soon board a ship bound for Keelung, Taiwan. On board they meet Chiu Hsiang (Bea Hayden) and her intellectual family.

In Taiwan, Sheng is discharged for his injury, while Huang and Fan desert the army to join him. The trio squeeze into a flat in a military dependents' village in Taipei, but military police soon arrive in the village to catch deserters like Huang and Fan, who face possible execution. Their crisis is solved when Sheng bribes government clerks to acquire National ID Cards. They begin to work, and the boy—now named Feng-hsien—starts school. Sheng re-encounters Chiu Hsiang, who offers to teach Feng-hsien piano lessons at her residence. Through the lessons, Sheng and Chiu Hsiang grow closer, as do Feng-hsien and Chiu Hsiang's baby sister Chiu Mei.

Both Huang and Fan fancy Lin Ah-yu (Ko Chia-yen), a Taiwanese woman who barely speaks Mandarin. Despite their language barrier, Huang and Lin fall in love and get married. Fan, very unhappy, moves out to live in the mountains in the south. Years later, Huang dies in a fire trying to save a child and Fan comes back to mourn him.

Sheng, having left his wife in mainland China for more than a decade, is by now secretly in love with Chiu Hsiang. Chiu Hsiang tells Sheng she will go to the United States to marry Chang Ming-jui, an old acquaintance. They exchange gifts, and when they sit down to talk on another occasion, Chiu Hsiang confesses her love for him. Their new-found happiness is abruptly terminated when Chiu's professor father is taken away by secret police for alleged dissidence. As Chang Ming-jui has many "connections" who may secure her father's safety, Chiu Hsiang has no choice but to leave Sheng.

Sheng is heartbroken, and it hasn't escaped Lin Ah-yu's attention. Already widowed for a few years but still sharing the same hut (but not the same room) as he, Lin secretly loves Sheng. But when she confesses her love, he rejects her. She moves out the next day.

In the 1970s, Feng-hsien (Mason Lee) and Chiu Mei (Amber Kuo) resume their friendship which soon blossoms into love. Sheng Peng meets Lin by accident, and invites her to Feng-hsien and Chiu Mei's wedding. During the wedding she also meets Chiu Hsiang who now lives in the United States. Sheng Peng dies of a heart attack in 1987, the same year Taiwan ends its White Terror (and lifts the travel ban to mainland China). In 2010, Sheng Feng-hsien (Tao Chuan-cheng), already an old man, travels to Sheng Peng's hometown in Shandong to meet with Sheng Peng's brother-in-law (Fan Kuang-yao). He learns that Sheng Peng's wife Ma Chiao-lin (Jiang Ruijia) and baby died within a year after Sheng Peng went to Taiwan.

== Cast ==
- Tony Yang as Sheng Peng
- Jiang Ruijia as Ma Chiao-lin, Sheng Peng's wife
- Peng Ling as Chiao-lin's brother
  - Fan Kuang-yao as Chiao-lin's brother (old)
- Li Xiaochuan as Huang Te-shun
- Ko Chia-yen as Lin Ah-yu
- Tsai Ming-hsiu as Lin Ah-yu's father
- George Hu as Fan Chung-yueh
- Zou Xuanqi as "Dog Two" (child), later renamed Feng-hsien
  - Mason Lee as Sheng Feng-hsien (teen/adult)
  - Tao Chuan-cheng as Sheng Feng-hsien (old)
- Bea Hayden as Chiu Hsiang
- Lin Yu-ju as Chiu Mei (child)
  - Amber Kuo as Chiu Mei (teen/adult)
- Lei Zhenyu as Chiu Hsiang's father
- Huang Tsai-yi as Chiu Hsiang's mother
- Lin Wen-yi as Chang Ming-li, Chiu Hsiang's best friend
- Liu Yanchen as Chang Ming-jui, Ming-li's brother
- Chang Shih as Sichuanese customer
- Liu Yueh-ti as Uncle Tang
- Wang Dao-nan as Colonel Tung
- Chu Chung-heng as Commander
