= Estrella Lin =

Taiwanese singer

- Born: 1980 (age 45–46); Taiwan

Chinese name
- Traditional Chinese: 林韋伶
- Simplified Chinese: 林韦伶
Transcriptions
Standard Mandarin
- Hanyu Pinyin: Lín Wéilíng
- Musical career
- Also known as: E-Lin

Estrella Lin (Chinese: 林韋伶; pinyin: Lín Wéilíng; born 1980) is a pop music singer from Taiwan, formerly a member of the girl group 3EP Beauties, and the author of a Chinese-language book detailing alleged abuses in South Korea's pop music industry.

== Career ==
In the 1990s, Lin was a member of Taiwan-based girl group 3EP Beauties (3EP美少女) under the stage-name "E-Lin" (韋伶), along with "Jin" (Jade Chou) and "Tin-Tin" (婷婷). One music video of theirs, "All Right", in which all three members wore bikinis, attracted considerable attention at the time; however, the group later dissolved. In 2002, Lin made her only appearance on the silver screen, in Ho Ping's movie The Rule of the Game; she played the role of a married woman who has an affair with a frequent customer at her hot pot restaurant, played by Hsia Ching-ting. For her role in the film, credited as "Wei Ling", she won the "Best New Actress" award at the 47th Asia-Pacific Film Festival in Seoul.

Lin had made plans to leave Taiwan and move to South Korea to attempt to break into the K-pop industry; however, her nude sex scene in The Rule of the Game, a departure from her "pure and cute" image as a member of 3EP Beauties, caused her difficulties in this regard and forced her to delay her plans. She finally moved to South Korea in 2007 to work with the talent management agency AntzStar (앤츠스타), run by South Korean actor Phillip Choi. There, she faced grueling conditions, including 15-hour days filled with rehearsals. She claims to have had to take injections of painkillers every two weeks in order to find relief from knee pain caused by dancing for five hours straight each day. Unable to bear the pressure, Lin aimed to go back home, but claims that her management company held her prisoner in her house in South Korea; in December 2009, with the aid of a friend, she escaped and successfully returned to Taiwan.

In August 2010, Lin published a book detailing alleged mistreatment of aspiring stars in South Korea's entertainment industry, including pressure on singers of both genders to provide sexual services to prospective investors. In response to the controversy, her former management agency made a public announcement to the South Korean media that they had inserted a new clause into their contracts with their trainees making clarifications that they had the right to refuse unnecessary body contact. However, another trainee at the same institute, Cherry (巧巧), noted primarily for her G-cup breasts, refuted some of Lin's accusations in an appearance on talk show Gossip Queen (麻辣天后宮), claiming that Lin had not been forced into unwanted sexual contact but rather had actively sought a sexual relationship with her manager.

In July 2010, Lin appeared nude in the Taiwan promotional materials for the Canadian film Splice. That same month, she also began guest appearances in the CTV television drama series Scent of Love (就是要香戀), giving the much younger Fok Siu-man (郝劭文) an on-screen kiss. In December 2010, she released a new photo collection book, "Angel's Stars" (天使的星星). However, at the press conference announcing its release, she was careful to emphasise that the book contained no nudity.

== Works ==
- 韓國星夢 [Korea Star Dream] (in Traditional Chinese), 青朝國際, 2010, ISBN 978-2-7025-2027-7
