= The Rule of the Game =

- Film poster
- Chinese: 挖洞人
- Literal meaning: Hole-Digging People
- Hanyu Pinyin: Wā Dòng Rén
- Directed by: Ho Ping
- Written by: Kuo Cheng
- Produced by: Wade C. Yao
- Starring: Chang Shih; Hsia Ching-ting; Lee Tien-chu; Ku Jung-kao; Kao Ming-wei; Ni Min-jan; Cheng Hsiu-ying; Chuang Shin-fu; Estrella Chen
- Cinematography: Han Yun-chung
- Edited by: Ho Ping; Gu Hsiao-yun
- Music by: Jerry Huang
- Production companies: Plaza Films; The Heat Production
- Release date: February 8, 2002 (Berlin International Film Festival)
- Running time: 103 minutes
- Country: Taiwan
- Language: Mandarin

The Rule of the Game is a 2002 Taiwanese black comedy film directed by Ho Ping and written by Kuo Cheng. The film focuses on a bunch of criminals and murderers whose paths crisscross in a small suburban town.

According to director Ho Ping, "this movie is about destiny and irony of my generation in Taiwan".

== Plot ==
Ox (Lee Tien-chu) had made a lot of money from killing people, but he had lost the money gambling. After his wife Xia (Estrella Chen)—who works at a small diner—had a child, Ox goes to Ji (Ni Min-jan) for his last assignment. He tells Ji he'll immigrate with his family after receiving the payment. A girl he knew from his gambling days (and likely slept with), Xiu-Xiu (Cheng Hsiu-ying), is staying with Ji apparently as a result of gambling away all her money. Ox and Xiu-Xiu dress as a couple and sneak into a Karaoke bar the hit target frequents. In an adjacent room to the bathroom, they drill a hole on the wall and successfully assassinate the mob boss using a suppressed gun.

Ju (Chang Shih) and Turtle (Hsia Ching-ting) are burglars who have collaborated in crimes since their schooldays. Turtle is upset that another alumnus Wu (Kao Ming-wei) used his property as a collateral to cheat him of NT$8 million, and they plan to murder him. Ju tells Turtle that they need to dig a hole deep enough for the corpse, so they find a spot up on a mountain and begin digging. They stop in Xia's eatery for their meals, and Turtle begins to seriously flirt with Xia. But when they are having sex, Ox returns home.

Wu tells his young wife Mei (Ku Jung-kao) how he got hold of Turtle's NT$8 million. Mei in turn discloses the secret to her lover Johnny (Chuang Shin-fu), and they plan to kidnap Wu for the sum. Johnny kidnaps Wu from his car and stuffs him in the trunk, before he and Mei realize they cannot acquire the fund without Wu's personal seal. Johnny opens the trunk, not knowing that Wu has found the gun he had hidden there. Wu opens fire and seriously injures Johnny, but Mei sits on the lid and the trunk again closes. Mei drags Johnny for a long distance for help, but Johnny dies. Meanwhile, Wu fires several shots from inside the trunk but cannot open the lid.

In the eatery, Ox tries to strangle Turtle, but is killed by Ju with a shovel. Ju and Turtle carry Ox's corpse and dump it into the grave they dug. During a quarrel, Ju insists it was Xia who killed Ox with a high-heel shoe. Turtle discovers Ju is hiding a corpse in his car trunk, and when he asks Ju whether it's his girlfriend or his dog, Ju does not answer. They find the money left behind by Ox from his assassination assignment. Ju tells Turtle he is free to decide what to do with it.

As Ox has left some money for Xiu-Xiu, she leaves Ji and begins a new life. Mei returns home, Wu is still trapped in the car, and Ju adopts a Rottweiler puppy. His car is dripping blood from the trunk.

== Awards and nominations ==
| Award | Category | Individual | Result |
|---|---|---|---|
| 47th Asia-Pacific Film Festival | Best New Actress | Estrella Chen | Won |
| 47th Asia-Pacific Film Festival | Special Jury Award | | Won |
| 47th Asia-Pacific Film Festival | Best Editing | Ho Ping, Gu Hsiao-yun | Won |
| 52nd Berlin International Film Festival | Don Quixote Award | | Won |
| 4th Deauville Asian Film Festival | Best Screenplay | Kuo Cheng | Won |

== Reception ==
Derek Elley of Variety wrote: "as in [Wolves Cry Under the Moon], Ho Ping and regular scripter Kuo Cheng take a group of eccentric characters and build an elaborate puzzle that mirrors much of the aimlessness and broken dreams of sections of modern Taiwanese society."
