= Four Hands =

Four Hands may refer to:

- Four Hands (film), a 2014 Taiwanese film
- Four Hands, Two Sonatas, a 2026 South Korean television series
- Piano four hands, a type of piano duet

== See also ==
- Four Hands Dinner, a 1999 Russian film
