= Kuo Cheng =

Taiwanese author (born 1955)

- Born: Tao Te-san; August 24, 1955 (age 71); Taipei, Taiwan
- Children: 3
- Relatives: Tao Te-chen, brother; Jing-shen Tao, uncle
- Writing career
- Pen name: Kuo Cheng; Ying Tianyu (應天魚)
- Language: Mandarin Chinese

Chinese name
- Traditional Chinese: 郭箏
- Simplified Chinese: 郭筝
Transcriptions
Standard Mandarin
- Hanyu Pinyin: Guō Zhēng
- Wade–Giles: Kuo^{1} Chêng^{1}

birth name
- Chinese: 陶德三
Transcriptions
Standard Mandarin
- Hanyu Pinyin: Táo Désān
- Wade–Giles: T'ao^{2} Te^{2}-san^{1}

Tao Te-san (born 24 August 1955), better known by his pen name Kuo Cheng, is a Taiwanese fiction writer. He is perhaps best known for writing the screenplays of several films directed by Ho Ping and Kevin Chu.

His older brother Tao Te-chen (陶德辰) was a filmmaker-actor in the 1980s. Their family originated in Huanggang, Hubei, China.

== Works ==
Year	Chinese title	Translated English title	Translator
1988	彈子王	"King of the Pool Players"	Ying-tsih Hwang
1991	狼行千里	"The Journey of the Wolf"	Susan Wilf
1991	上帝的骰子	"God's Dice"	

"The Journey of the Wolf" was one of the stories Kuo used when he and director Ho Ping wrote the screenplay for Ho's 1997 film Wolves Cry Under the Moon.

== Filmography ==
=== Films ===
Year	English title	Chinese title	Director	Notes
1985	One Bright Day	好個翹課天	Fu Wei-te	original story (adapted by Wu Nien-jen)
1986	Gallery of Fools	哥們的糗事	Fu Wei-te	original story (adapted by Yeh Yun-chiao and Chang Chien)
1993	18		Ho Ping	
1995	Heartbreak Island	去年冬天	Hsu Hsiao-ming	co-wrote with John S.C. Chiang
1995	Trouble Maker	臭屁王	Kevin Chu	
1996	The Feeling of Love	重慶愛情感覺	Kevin Chu	
1996	Naughty Boys & Soldiers	狗蛋大兵	Kevin Chu	
1997	Wolves Cry Under the Moon	國道封閉	Ho Ping	
1998	Chivalrous Legend	俠盜正傳	Tsai Yang-ming	co-wrote with Wu Nien-jen
2000	The Spy Tycoon	匪諜大亨	Ho Ping	TV film
2002	The Rule of the Game	挖洞人	Ho Ping	
2005	One Stone and Two Birds	一石二鳥	Kevin Chu	co-wrote with Lin Man-hsu
2008	Red Cliff	赤壁	John Woo	historical film, co-wrote with Woo, Sheng Heyu and Chan Khan
2015	Where the Wind Settles	風中家族	Wang Toon	co-wrote with Carol Li, Lin Chi-shiang, and Wu Jing

=== TV dramas (incomplete) ===
Year	English title	Chinese title	Notes
1997	The Strange Cases of Lord Shi	施公奇案	
1999	Lord of Imprisonment	神捕	
1999	Resurrecting the Husband	聊齋怪談之打鬼救夫	
2001	Legend of the Martial Alliance	少林七崁	
2001	Chess Warriors	棋武士	
2001	Swordsman	多情刀客無情刀短刀行	
2001	Pretty Twins	偷龍轉鳳	
2004	Thirteen Sons of Heaven Bridge	天橋十三郎	
2016	Xiao Shiyilang	新萧十一郎	

== Awards and nominations ==
Year	#	Award	Category	Film	Result
1993	30th	Golden Horse Awards	Best Adapted Screenplay	18	Nominated
2001	36th	Golden Bell Awards	Best Screenwriter (TV Film or Miniseries)	The Spy Tycoon	Nominated
2002	4th	Deauville Asian Film Festival	Best Screenplay	The Rule of the Game	Won
