= A Flower in the Raining Night =

1983 Taiwanese film by Wang Toon

- Film poster
- Chinese: 看海的日子
- Hanyu Pinyin: Kànhǎi de rìzǐ
- Directed by: Wang Toon
- Written by: Huang Chun-ming
- Based on: Days of Watching the Sea by Huang Chun-ming
- Produced by: Mei Chang-Kun; Zhang Mei-Jun
- Cinematography: Lin Hong Zhong
- Edited by: Chen Sheng Chang
- Music by: Zhang Hong Yi
- Production company: Montage Film Co.
- Distributed by: Montage Film Co. (Hong Kong)
- Release date: 7 October 1983 (Taiwan)
- Running time: 100
- Country: Taiwan
- Language: Mandarin
- Box office: TWD$23 million (Taiwan); HKD$2.53 million (Hong Kong)

A Flower in the Raining Night is a 1983 Taiwanese film directed by Wang Toon. Adapted from the novel Days of Watching the Sea written by Huang Chun-ming, the film portrays the journey of a prostitute who is determined to become a mother to regain her dignity as a human being. It is one of the few commercially successful films of Taiwan New Cinema in the 1980s, in which its box office reached TWD$23,000,000, HKD$2,536,132.00 and was nominated for Best Narrative Feature at the 20th Golden Horse Awards.

== Plot ==
Bai Mei (白梅) is an adopted girl to an impoverished family living in Jiufen. She was sold to a private brothel in Zhongli by her father when she was still young. She later works at Nanfangao, a fishing port in northern Taiwan, during the harvesting season. After her father dies, Bai takes the train back to Jiufen for his funeral, during which is insulted by one of her brothel customers. Bai Mei meets Ying Ying, one of her best friends in the brothel who was able to escape prostitution early via marriage.

Bai's chance encounter with Ying Ying brought back bad memories of their life as prostitutes. Because of her social status, Bai Mei was shunned by the younger brothers and sisters she helped raise with her blood money, with her sister-in-law refusing to let Bai hold her son. Disappointed and heartbroken, Bai decides to leave prostitution behind. Out of the belief that she could be viewed as a normal member of society by becoming a mother, she decides on the train back to Nanfangao to have a baby of her own. Bai consents to letting Wu Tiantu, a kind and honest fisherman, impregnate her. The following day, she returns to her family of origin at Kengdi (坑底), where villagers grew sweet potatoes to barely make a living.

Bai discovers that she is pregnant as planned. She helps pay for her elder brother's leg amputation to save his life. Bai suggests controlling the provision of sweet potatoes in the market, helping the villagers sell their harvest for a better price and winning their respect. After a long and difficult labor, she gives birth to a son.

== Cast ==
Role	Actor
Bai Mei	Lu Hsiao-fen
Wu Tiantu	Ma Ju-feng
Yin Yin	Su Ming-ming
Little Bai Mei	Lin Hsiu Ling
Yin Yin’s client	Weng Chia Ming
Birth Mother of Bai Mei	Ying Ying
Older Brother of Bai Mei	Hsiao Hou Tou
Bai Mei’s sister-in-law	Mei Fang
Villager	Fang Lung
Bawd 1	Su Chu
Bawd 2	Ah-Pi Po

== Production ==
Some scenes of A Flower in the Raining Night were shot at Yilan (Shuang-lian-pi), Jiufen, Hualien and Jinshan. In one of his interviews, Wang Toon mentioned that it is the intimate relationship between people and the ocean that made him choose Hualien and Jinshan as the shooting locations for this film.

The set design of private brothels in the film was based on those at Baodou Village (寶斗里) in Taipei, Huang Chun-ming complained about the brothels in the film being much more spacious than those in reality. Wang Toon defended his portrayal by pointing out the practical need of filmmaking.

Wang Toon graduated from the National Taiwan College of Arts, majoring in fine arts and worked as an art director for many movies before making his first film, If I Were for Real in 1981. As the art director of this film, he tried to use the contrast of light and shadow to represent the different emotions of Bai Mei, especially in the sex scene in which Bai Mei hopes to be impregnated by the fisherman Wu Tiantu.

It is noted that Wang Toon also made use of windows in some key shots to represent the inner emotions of Bai Mei, such as the different stages of Bai Mei’s life from oppression to the new life.

The scene in which Bai Mei breastfed her child was cut because of film censorship at that time in Taiwan, despite Wang Toon’s explanation that the scene is necessary for the film to show Bai Mei’s motherhood.

Moreover, Taiwanese characters in the film have to speak Mandarin even when they are conversing with each other because of the language policy of Taiwan during the martial law. Wang Toon asked most of the actors and actresses to dub their own characters except Lu Hsiao-fen, whose voice was not that good on screen according to Wang Toon.

When asked if he had a chance to modify A Flower in the Raining Night, what he would like to change the most? Wang Toon said that he would reshoot the film in Taiwanese.

A Flower in the Raining Night grossed TWD$23,000,000.00 in Taiwan and HK$2,536,132.00 Hong Kong. The film became the second highest-grossing Taiwanese film of 1983, after Papa, Can You Hear Me Sing?

== Awards ==
At the 20th Golden Horse Awards, the film won Best Leading Actress (Lu Hsiao-fen) and Best Supporting Actress (Ying Ying). It was also nominated for Best Narrative Feature, and Best Adapted Screenplay (Huang Chun-ming).
