= Public housing in Taiwan =

Housing programmes of the Taiwan government

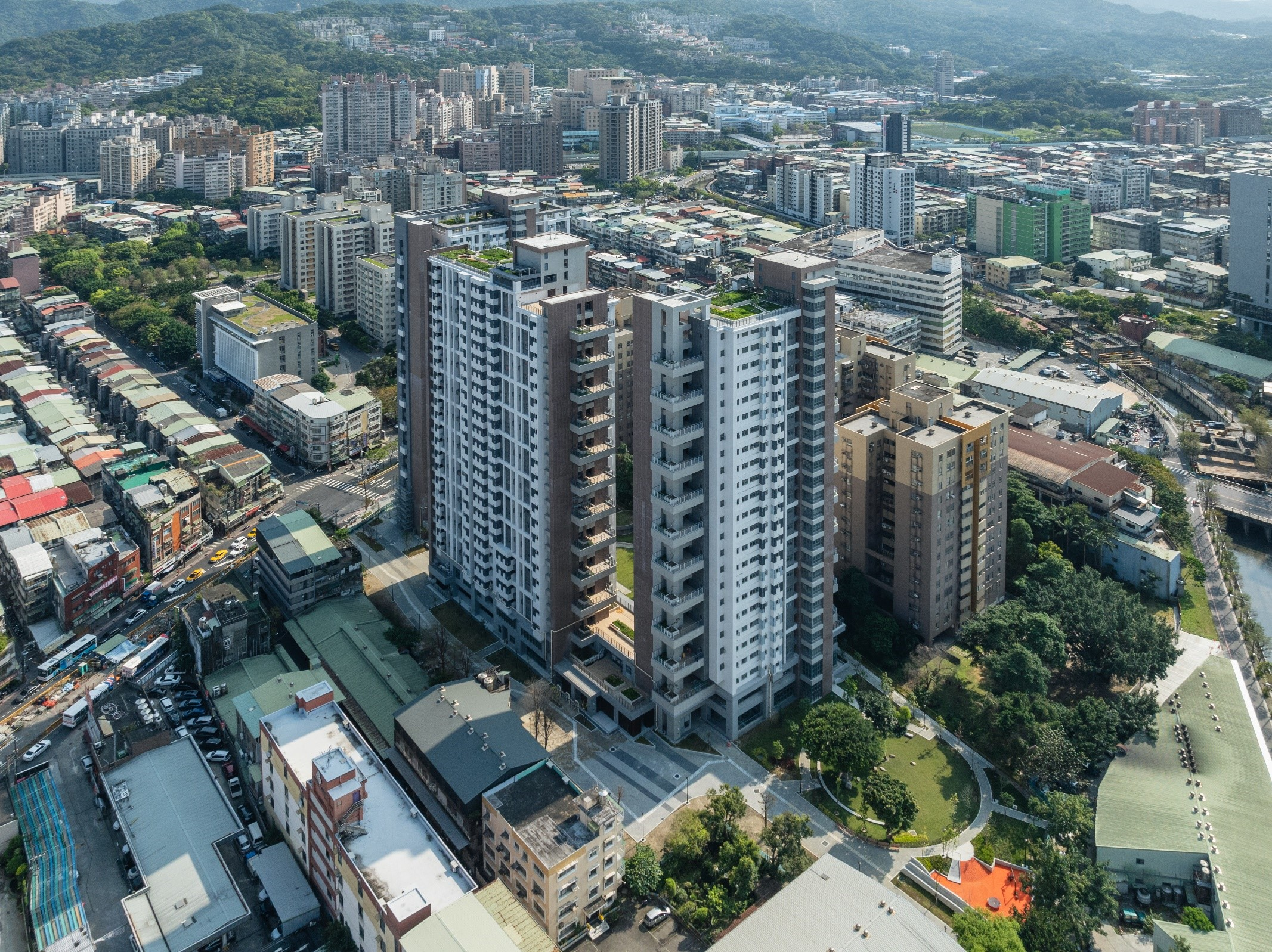
Zhonghe Anbang Social Housing located in Zhonghe District, New Taipei City that houses 630 housing units and was completed in 2023.

Public housing in Taiwan (臺灣公共住宅) has been a key component of the Taiwan government’s efforts to provide affordable housing since the post-World War II era. Public housing development in Taiwan initially aimed to address the needs of a growing population and the ageing condition of military-dependent housing. Over the decades, the focus has evolved in response to housing market changes, economic growth, and urbanization.

== History ==
=== Early developments (1940s–1980s) ===
Following the end of World War II and the Kuomintang's retreat to Taiwan, the nation experienced rapid population growth. The influx of military personnel and their families created an urgent demand for housing, which was addressed through the construction of military dependents' villages (眷村). These villages, often consisting of basic housing structures, were built to accommodate the families of soldiers but later became a part of Taiwan's unique housing history.

In the 1970s, Taiwan's economic growth led to increased urbanization, intensifying the demand for affordable urban housing. In response, the government launched a national public housing initiative in 1976, constructing approximately 390,000 units by 1985 to accommodate around 1.58 million residents. The project was administered by local government bodies, including the National Housing Bureau (國宅局), with a focus on providing housing to civil servants, rebuilding older military villages, and creating communities open for public purchase.

=== Shift in policy (1990s) ===
By the late 1990s, Taiwan's housing market had changed. The private sector began supplying an excess of housing, making public housing less essential for the general population. At this point, the government largely halted new public housing construction, except for projects focused on rebuilding military-dependent villages. The shift was partly due to concerns about potential collusion between government officials and developers, as well as the desire to avoid competing with private housing developers.

=== Recent initiatives (2010s–present) ===
In the 2010s, skyrocketing urban property prices, driven in part by real estate speculation, prompted the government to revisit public housing. In response, the government introduced new models, including Social Housing (社會住宅) and Affordable Housing (合宜住宅), both designed to provide affordable rental or purchase options for low- to middle-income households. These projects were often developed through public-private partnerships, allowing private developers to participate in construction while the government retained control over rental and sales prices.

==== Social housing programs ====
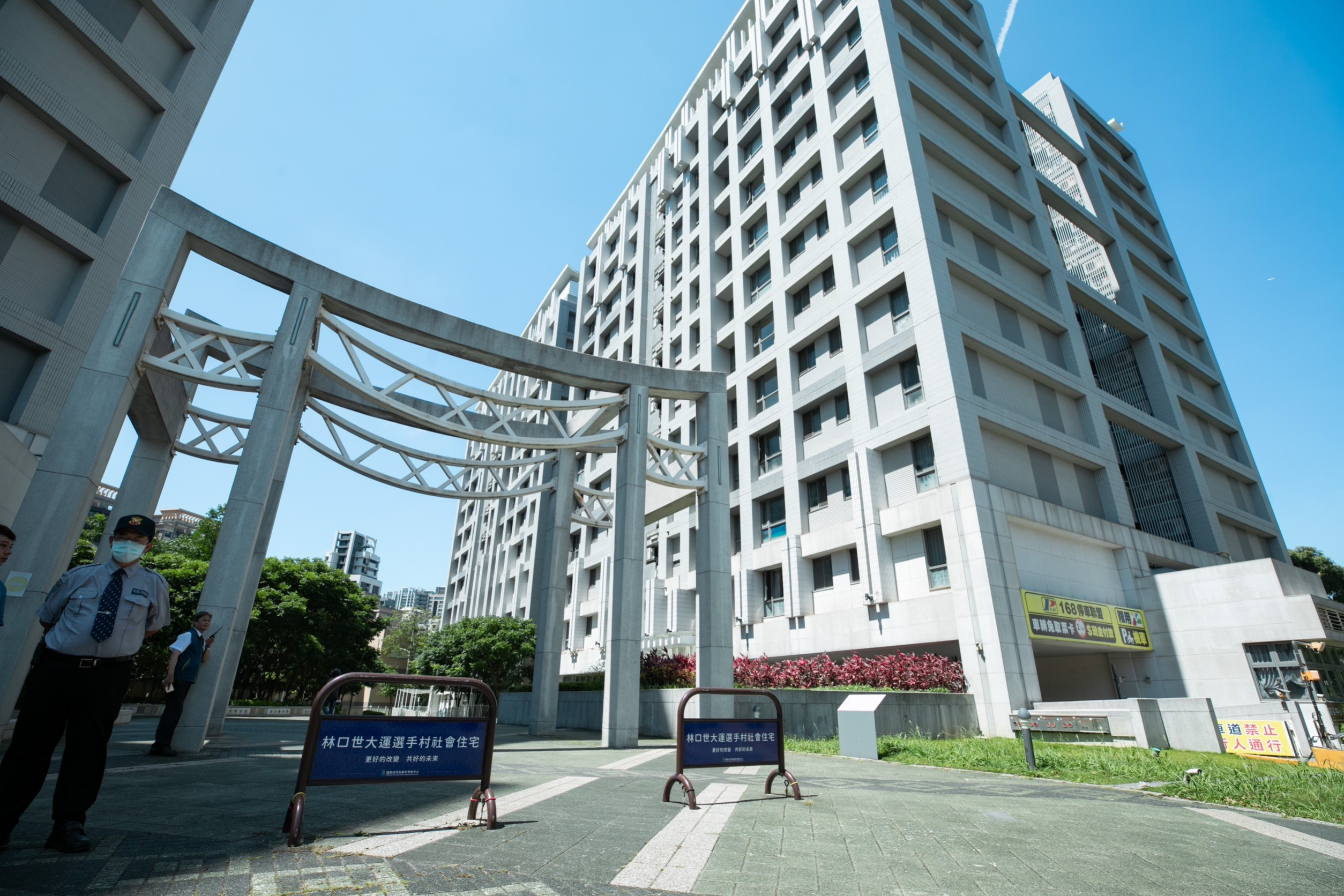
Linkou World Universiade Athlete Village Social Housing located in Linkou District, New Taipei that was completed in 2017.

Taiwan's social housing program, launched in 2014, aimed to offer long-term rental options for low-income families, young professionals, and other vulnerable populations. Social housing units are primarily rental units overseen by local governments, with Taipei and New Taipei City as major participants. The units are often rented at below-market rates, with eligibility requirements focusing on income and family structure. Taiwan's public housing is generally categorized into three types:

==== Affordable housing and controversies ====
The affordable housing program, or "合宜住宅" (also called "Suitability Housing"), was created to provide purchase options for first-time homebuyers and young families. These units are often located in suburban or less developed urban areas. However, some projects faced criticism and accusations of corruption, with concerns about collusion between officials and developers in the selection and construction processes.

== Types of public housing ==
Public housing in Taiwan is generally classified into three main types:

- Rebuilt military-dependent villages: These projects replace aging military-dependent housing communities. Many of these new housing areas retain the historical naming convention of "New Village" (新村).
- Housing for civil servants and their families: These units are intended for government employees and their families, often providing secure housing at lower-than-market rates.
- Public housing open to private Purchase: Although less common, certain public housing units are available for purchase by the general public. These communities were initially more widespread but have become rarer since the 1990s.

== Challenges and criticisms ==
Public housing in Taiwan has faced various challenges. The initial public housing efforts in the 1970s and 1980s were criticized for inadequate facilities and low-quality construction. Moreover, as Taiwan's economy developed, many people opted to purchase private housing, which led to a reduced demand for public housing.

In recent years, criticism has focused on issues of transparency and corruption. The affordable housing programs, in particular, faced scrutiny due to alleged ties between developers and government officials, resulting in public mistrust and calls for stronger regulations in housing policies.

== See also ==
- Public housing in Hong Kong
- Public housing in Singapore
- Military dependents' village
