= One Stone and Two Birds =

- Film poster
- Traditional Chinese: 一石二鳥
- Simplified Chinese: 一石二鳥
- Hanyu Pinyin: Yi Shi Er Niao
- Directed by: Kevin Chu
- Written by: Kuo Cheng; Lin Man-hsu
- Produced by: Kevin Chu; Pi Chien-Hsin
- Starring: Ruby Lin; Eric Tsang; Ng Man Tat
- Cinematography: Ng Man-Ching
- Distributed by: China Film Group
- Release dates: January 16, 2005 (China); January 19, 2005 (Taiwan)
- Running time: 110 minutes
- Country: Taiwan
- Language: Mandarin

One Stone and Two Birds (Pinyin: Yi Shi Er Niao) is a 2005 Taiwanese film directed by Kevin Chu.

== Plot ==
During the reign of Jiajing Emperor of the Ming dynasty, the evil court official Yan Song relies on the emperor favoritism towards him, becoming overbearing and domineering. An honest official Zhang Yinglong impeaches Yan Song with a "Ten Cimes Five Deceits" against him. But instead he gets flogged 30 times, and banished to a far off frontier Guizhou.

Zhang Yinglong's remonstration won the hearts of the common people, on the day of his banishment thousands of people turned out to see him off. At the sight of this, Yan Song knows that if he does not kill off Zhang Yinglong, he will be unable to deter other court officials. Thereupon, he arranges for assassins to kill Zhang Yinglong during the journey.

In Guizhou, between the high mountain ridge lies a small relay station. Because this place is far off and also not deemed an important area by the government, therefore the relay station has become run-down. The relay station is managed by two young people, Shi Yipao and Bu Deliao, and also Zeng Wuliao. Shi Yipao seems like a person who feels that he never gets enough sleep, and has a look of bewilderment on him every day. Bu Deliao and Zeng Wuliao are both are diligent, but they are kind of stupid looking. These three people have already spent six useless years in this boring place.

== Cast ==
- Ruby Lin as 馨馨 (Xin Xin)
- Eric Tsang as 老李 (Lao Li)
- Ng Man Tat as 曾武了 (Zeng Wu Le)
- Jacky Wu as 石仪咆 (Dan Yi Pao)
- Xe Cun as 得辽 (De Liao)
- Gao Hu as 柳玉树 (Liu Yu Shu)
- Wang Gang as Gui Jian Chou
- Chen Rong as 萧贯虹 (Xiao Guan Hong)
