= Military dependents' village =

Communities in Taiwan

- Chinese: 眷村
Transcriptions
Standard Mandarin
- Hanyu Pinyin: Juàncūn
Southern Min
- Hokkien POJ: Kòan-chhun; Kòan-chhoan

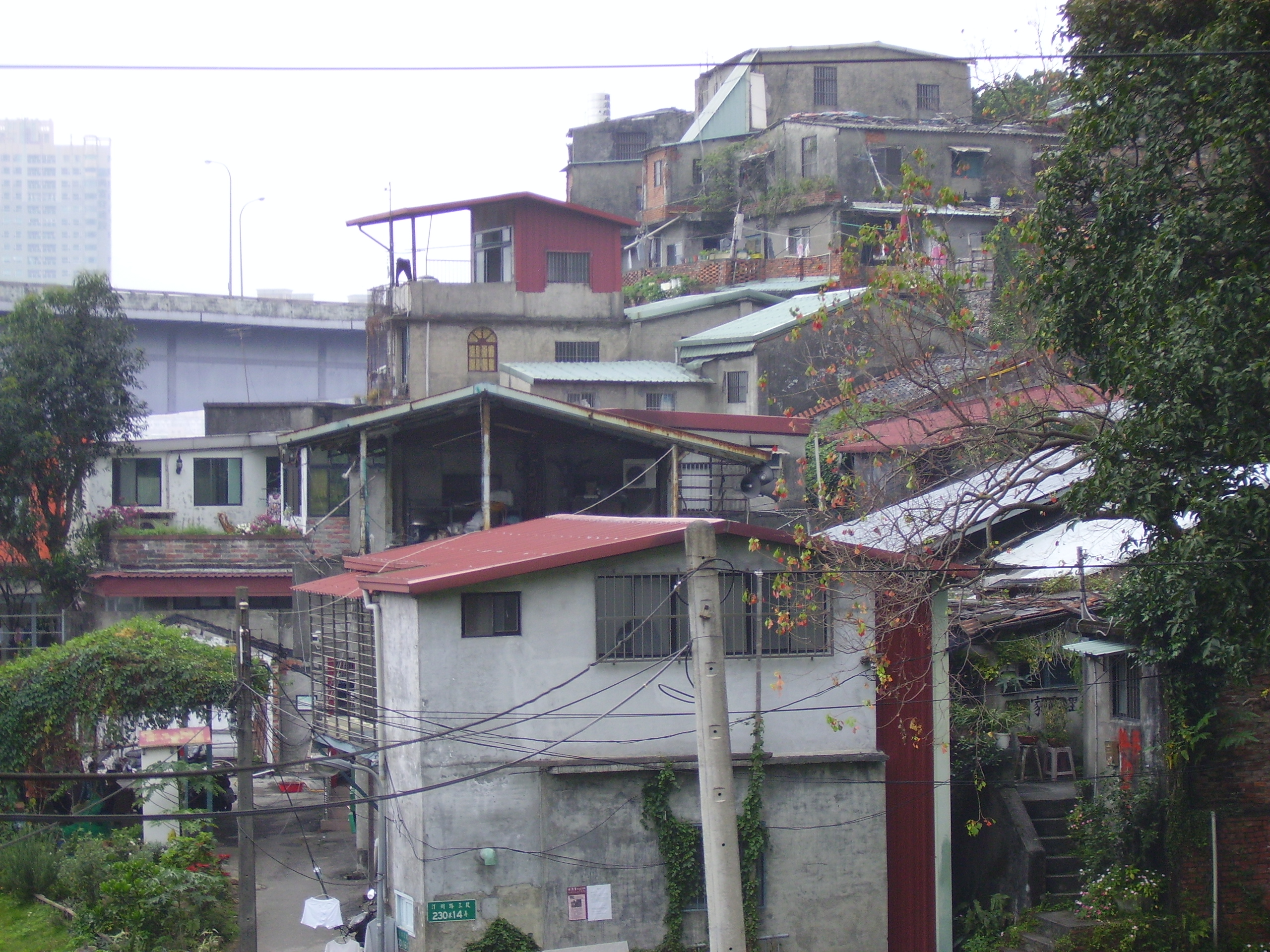
Typical jumbled appearance of a military dependents' village

Military dependents' villages (Chinese: 眷村) are communities in Taiwan built in the late 1940s and the 1950s whose original purpose was to serve as provisional housing for soldiers, sailors, airmen and marines of the Republic of China Armed Forces, along with their dependents from mainland China after the Government of the Republic of China (ROC) and the Kuomintang (KMT) retreated to Taiwan in 1949. They ended up becoming permanent settlements, forming distinct cultures as enclaves of mainlanders in Taiwanese cities. Over the years, many military dependents' villages have suffered from problems such as housing dereliction, abandonment, urban decay, and becoming slums.

The houses in these villages were often haphazardly and poorly constructed, having been built hastily and with limited funding. The residents had no private land ownership rights for the houses they lived in, as the land was government property.

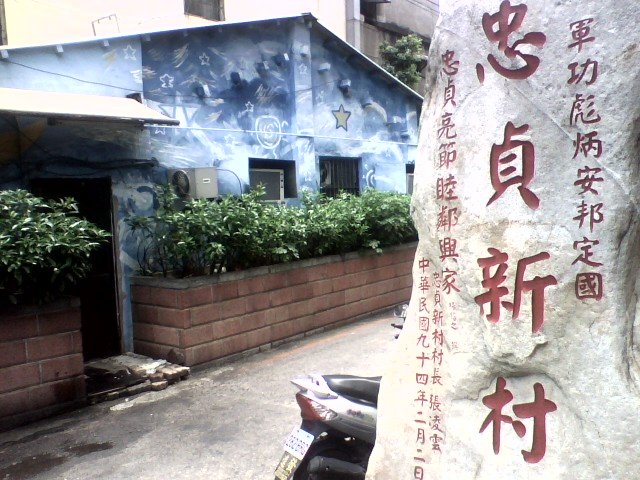
Entry to "Zhongzhen New Residential Quarter" in Hsinchu city, with a new memorial stone.

Following the passage of the Act for Rebuilding Old Quarters for Military Dependents in 1996, the government began an aggressive program of demolishing these villages and replacing them with highrises, giving the residents rights to live in the new apartments. As of 2019, there are less than 30 left out of an original number of 879, and some have been preserved as historic sites.

In a broad sense, the word can also mean the quarters for U.S. Military Advisory Group officers and their dependents in Taiwan.

== Architecture ==
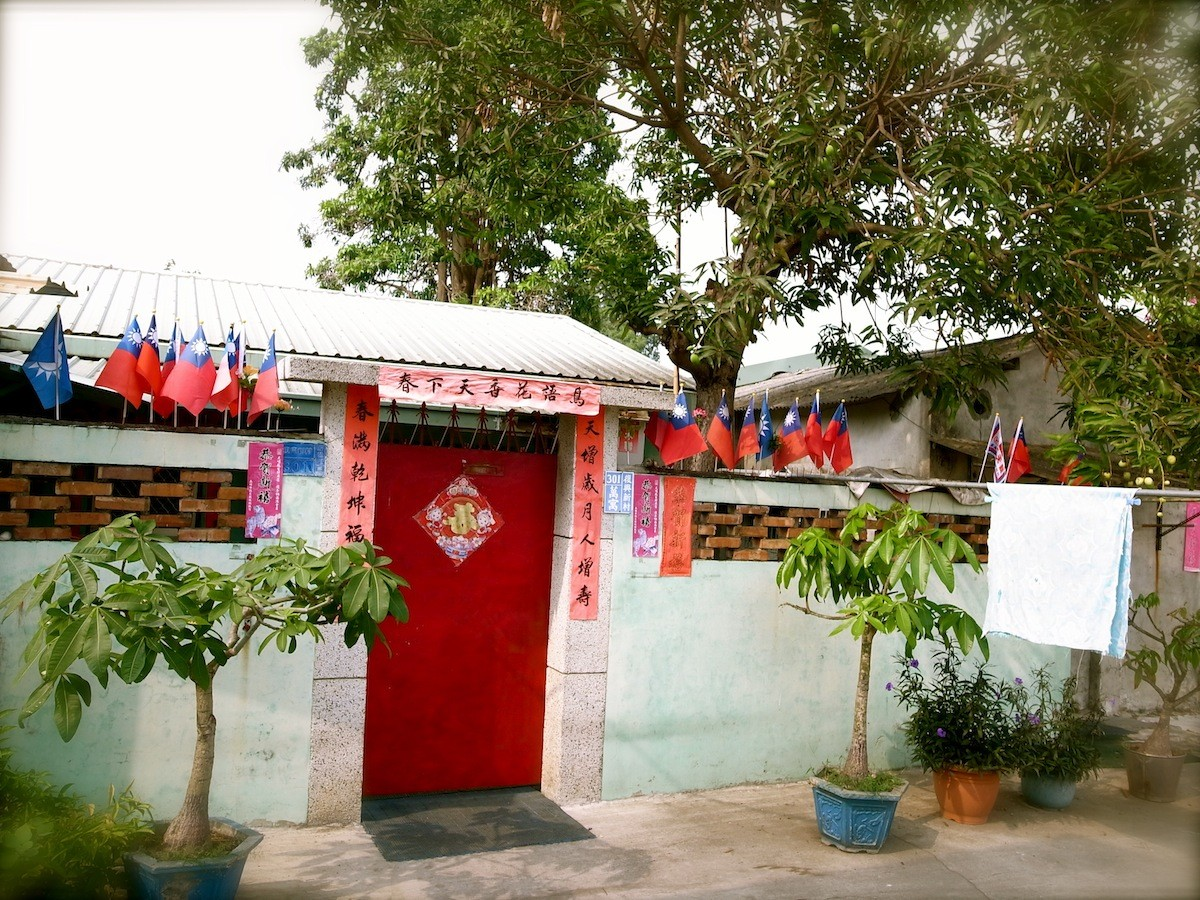
Military Dependents' Village house

In the 1950s, most Dependents' Villages, except the legacy from the Japanese colonization, were built with minimal building standards on public land. The very common properties were built with straw-laid roof and mud-consolidated bamboo wall. It was only after the 1960s that the military reconstructed properties with bricks; and at the same time incorporated private toilets, bathrooms, kitchens, main pillars, roof tiles and electrical circuits into the properties. Till this, the properties of the Dependents Village had finally reached the same standards aligning with the rest of the architectures in Taiwan. By the end of the 1970s, Taiwan's property market was heated up with tremendous amount of newly built and renovated properties. However, due to housing ownership problems, houses in the Dependents Villages could not be rebuilt and replaced. Most of them suffered from outdated facilities and crowdedness. Each house had only 6–10 ping (1 ping ≈ 3.3 square metres) excluded the attached garden. Hence brick construction or reinforced brick-built, low level juàncūn properties had been comparatively derelict, especially within inner urban area.

Generally speaking, juàncūn from ten to hundreds of units tend to segregate themselves from the rest of the society. Although it tightened the relationship within the village, it had unavoidably prevented mingling and communications between the tenants and the rest of the communities outside.

Dependents' Villages is a unique cultural landscape that may soon pass into oblivion, as old soldiers pass away and urban renewal and redevelopment takes place. Also, out of patriotism and anti-Communism, residents of the military dependents' village, sharing the same professionalism, could usually build their own sense of community through frequent social networking.

In the early period, considering the sensitivity of soldiers' identity, the surrounding areas of military camps were heavily guarded, including the dependents' village; for the sake of clarification, relatives of soldiers had to present their resident permit in order to have access. Because the salary of soldiers was low at that time, the government provided educational assistance, medical treatment, and daily necessities like rice, flour, salad, and so forth, to supplement their living, which could be received only by showing a certain certificate as evidence. Mahjong is the most popular leisure activity. As the residents of the dependents' village all came from different provinces, along with them, they brought different tastes and regional wheaten foods, which contributed to the elaboration of Taiwanese wheaten food culture. Part of the slang used in military dependents' village later got integrated into the vocabularies of Taiwanese language.

Initially, none of the military families would have expected a permanent stalemate across the Taiwan straits. They either hoped to regroup, rearm, and then retake the mainland with US assistance, or feared that Communist armies would press on and take Taiwan too. In either case, the immediate impulse was to consider Taiwan as a temporary refuge for the medium-term.

== Urban debates ==
Juàncūn is a burdened landscape inherited from the martial law era (1949–1987) in Taiwan. It has been seen as an unfair welfare provision that was predominately available to the Kuomintang (KMT) military and their families. The impact to the society in terms of social segregation and imbalance resource allocation has turn out to be more revolted than expected.

Juàncūn has now been the focus of dynamic architectural, political and cultural debate shaped by tensions between different collective memories as well as conflicting interests and visions of what the new urban landscape of 'new' Taiwan should be. G. Delanty and P. R. Jones's discourse (2002) about continuous debates and struggles as to which memories and symbols are to be preserved or destroyed from the urban landscape of the city can be clearly realized in the context of juàncūn and its preservation.

== Popular culture ==
Due to a mix of the unique cultural and historical background of these villages, many creative works either feature life in the dependents' villages or are set in them as a background. Some notable examples are included as follows.

=== Film ===
- Papa, Can You Hear Me Sing (搭錯車), 1983.
- A Brighter Summer Day (牯嶺街少年殺人事件), directed by Edward Yang, 1991.
- Darkness and Light (黑暗之光), directed by Chang Tso-chi, 1999.
- The Best of Times (美麗時光), directed by Chang Tso-chi, 2002.
- War Game 229 (燃燒吧！歐吉桑), 2011.
- Four Hands (麵引子), 2011.

=== Television series ===
- Story of Our Time (光陰的故事 (電視劇)), 2008.
- A Touch of Green (一把青 (電視劇)), 2015.

== Notable people from military dependents' villages ==
=== Art ===
- Huang Yung-Fu

=== Film ===
- Ang Lee
- Hou Hsiao-hsien
- Doze Niu
- Edward Yang
- Brigitte Lin
- Sylvia Chang
- Joey Wong

=== Music ===
- Teresa Teng
- Chang Yu-sheng
- Pan An-bang
- Hou Dejian
- Richie Jen
- Tsai Chin
- Annie Yi

=== Television ===
- Blackie Chen
- Ethan Juan
- Frankie Kao

=== Literature ===
- Lung Ying-tai
- Chu T’ien-hsin
- Chu T’ien-wen
- Yuan Chiung-chiung
- Zhang Dachun

=== Politics ===
- James Soong
- Jason Hu
- Chiang Hsiao-yen
- Winston Chang
- Eric Chu
- Hau Lung-pin
- Chang Ya-chung

=== Organized crime ===
- Chen Chi-li
- Tung Kuei-sen

== See also ==
- Hsinchu Museum of Military Dependents Village
- Public housing in Taiwan
- Red Envelope Club
- Tiu Keng Leng
- Treasure Hill
