= Pan An-bang =

- Born: 10 September 1954; Magong, Penghu, Taiwan
- Died: 3 February 2013 (aged 58); Guishan, Taoyuan City, Taiwan
- Occupations: Singer, tv host, actor
- Years active: 1977–1993, 2000–2013

Chinese name
- Traditional Chinese: 潘安邦
- Simplified Chinese: 潘安邦
Transcriptions
Southern Min
- Hokkien POJ: Phoaⁿ An-pang
- Musical career
- Origin: Taiwan
- Genres: Mandopop, folk

Pan An-bang (Chinese: 潘安邦; pinyin: Pān Ānbāng; Pe̍h-ōe-jī: Phoaⁿ An-pang; 10 September 1954 – 3 February 2013), was a Taiwanese pop and folk singer, television presenter and actor. He was famous for the song "Grandma's Penghu Bay" (外婆的澎湖灣), which is one of the classic Taiwanese campus folk songs in the late 1970s. He was also one of the first pop singers from Taiwan to perform in mainland China in the 1980s. After the successful nationwide television performance on CCTV New Year's Gala in 1989, he became well-known on both sides of the Strait. He died from kidney cancer in 2013.

== Life and career ==
=== Early life ===
Pan An-bang was born in a military dependents' village in Magong, Penghu in 1954. He was the first of four children in the family. His father came from mainland China to Penghu as a soldier of the Republic of China Armed Forces in the 1940s. During his childhood, he often helped his grandmother to cultivate mung bean sprouts and sell them at the market.

=== Music career ===
==== Taiwan and Southeast Asia – 1977 to 1986 ====
After he graduated from high school, he left Penghu and went to Taipei for university examination. In 1976, he was scouted by a television staff and offered a job as contract singer of Chinese Television System. In 1979, he helped Ye Jia-xiu, a folk song singer-songwriter, to promote songs on television program. Ye then wrote the song "Grandma's Penghu Bay", which later became Pan's signature song, for him.

After the success of the debut album, the albums released in the following years, including "The Voices of Youth" (年輕人的心聲) and "Errant Love" (聚散兩依依), made him popular in Taiwan and also in Singapore and Malaysia. "Father's Straw Sandal" (爸爸的草鞋), which was one track from the album "Errant Love", was banned by the government of Republic of China. The song was also written by Ye and inspired by Pan's father's real life as a soldier from mainland China. The song was more popular in Southeast Asia than in Taiwan and even spread to mainland China.

In 1982, Pan was invited to perform in University of California, Los Angeles. He fell in love with a student of UCLA, who was a Taiwanese American. He married her in 1986 and then he also moved to the United States, where he started in clothing industry.

==== Mainland China – 1989 to 1993 ====
Not long after the ban on family visits across the Strait was lifted in 1987, Pan was invited to perform on CCTV New Year's Gala in 1989. Despite Pan's father's job at the Office of President of the Republic of China, his father encouraged him. He performed three songs, including "Follow Your Feeling" (跟著感覺走), "Grandma's Penghu Bay", and "Sun and Moon", on stage. He became very popular in mainland China after the nationwide broadcast of the show. However, later in the year, Pan had been forbidden to perform on stage for about one year since 1989 Tiananmen Square protests. He reduced music activity in Asia and lived with his family in the United States in the 1990s.

==== Comeback – 2001 to 2013 ====
In 2001, Pan had an aortic dissection attack in Malaysia. After that, he stayed in Taiwan for 2 years for treatment, which made him decide to make a stage comeback. In 2004, Pan released a new album, "Good Times" (美好時光). In 2007, he had another aortic dissection attack in Singapore, and survived emergency surgery. Despite suffering critical illness, he returned to the stage quickly. He performed at a China Central Television concert in mainland China in 2007, and also performed at a National Day of the Republic of China evening gala in Penghu in 2010.

In 2008, he started hosting the talk show "Heartlight in the Human World" (人間心燈) on Beautiful Life Television, a television station established by Fo Guang Shan, and continued hosting the program until 2012.

=== Death ===
In 2011, he was diagnosed with kidney cancer. In 2013, he died of sepsis related to chemotherapy at the age of 58.

== Grandma's Penghu Bay ==
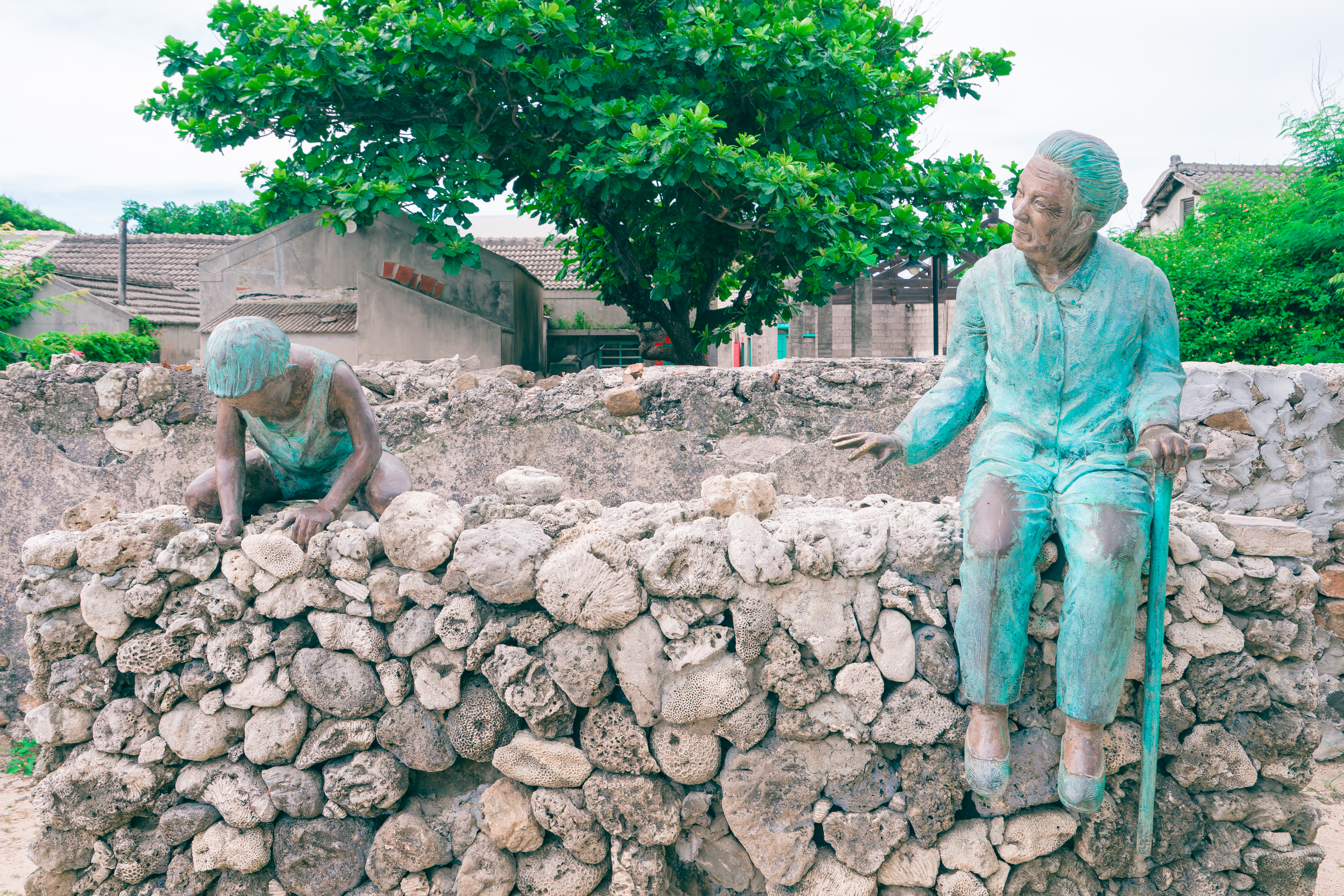
Pan An-Bang Museum

“Grandma's Penghu Bay" is a track from Pan's debut album released in 1979. The song was written by Ye Jia-xiu and directly inspired by Pan's childhood life with his grandmother in Penghu, which is a group of islands in the Taiwan Strait. Since the song was widely spread, tourists have come to Penghu looking for "sunshine, beach, waves, cactuses, and the old skipper" depicted in the song. After Pan's death in 2013, the house where Pan spent his childhood was renamed "Pan An-Bang Museum" to pay tribute to Pan.

== Discography ==
- Grandma's Penghu Bay (1979)
- The Voices of Youth (1980)
- Errant Love (聚散两依依) (1981)
- Good Times (2004)

== Filmography ==
- Windflower in the Storm (花非花) (1978)
- The Clouds Know Your Name (1981)
- Pledge in Quick Sand (1984)
- Young Spirit of a Taiwanese Opera Singer (青春歌仔) (TV, 2009) as Shen Ching-wei
- Comedy Makes You Cry （拍卖春天) (2009) as Zhao Gang
