= 20th Golden Horse Awards =

Award ceremony for Chinese-language films of 1982 and 1983

- Date: November 16, 1983
- Site: Kaohsiung Cultural Center, Kaohsiung, Taiwan
- Hosted by: Sun Yueh and Tien Niu
- Organized by: Taipei Golden Horse Film Festival Executive Committee

Highlights
- Best Feature Film: Growing Up
- Best Director: Chen Kun-hou; Growing Up
- Best Actor: Sun Yueh; Papa, Can You Hear Me Sing
- Best Actress: Lu Hsiao-fen; A Flower in the Raining Night
- Most awards: Papa, Can You Hear Me Sing (4)
- Most nominations: Papa, Can You Hear Me Sing (11)

Television in Taiwan
- Channel: TTV

The 20th Golden Horse Awards (Chinese: 第20屆金馬獎) took place on November 16, 1983 at the Kaohsiung Cultural Center in Kaohsiung, Taiwan.

== Winners and nominees ==
Winners are listed first and highlighted in boldface.

**Best Feature Film**: **Growing Up**; The Wheel of Life; Hong Kong, Hong Kong; Papa, Can You Hear Me Sing; A Flower in the Raining Night; That Day, on the Beach	**Best Documentary Film**: **夏爾降坡公路**; 東方藝術殿堂; 陽光畫家吳炫三; 燃燒吧！王船; 營長牧場
**Best Animation**: **Bremen 4: Angels in Hell**; 牛伯伯與小妹大破鑽石城	**Best Director**: **Chen Kun-hou — Growing Up**; Choi Kai-kwong — Hong Kong, Hong Kong; Edward Yang — That Day, on the Beach
**Best Leading Actor**: **Sun Yueh — Papa, Can You Hear Me Sing**; Chen Jen-lei — Traveler; Alex Man — Hong Kong, Hong Kong	**Best Leading Actress**: **Lu Hsiao-fen — A Flower in the Raining Night**; Jang Chuen-fang — Growing Up; Cherie Chung — Hong Kong, Hong Kong
**Best Supporting Actor**: **Ku Feng — 待罪的女孩**; Chen Bor-jeng — The Sandwich Man; Doze Niu — Growing Up	**Best Supporting Actress**: **Ying Ying — A Flower in the Raining Night**; Li Tai-ling — Send in the Clowns; Chiang Hsia — Papa, Can You Hear Me Sing
**Best Child Star**: **Shi An-ni — Magic**; Liu Hsiao-hua — A Little Boy's Desire; Yen Cheng-kuo — The Sandwich Man
