= Wang Ben-hu =

Taiwanese writer and television presenter

Wang Jui-cheng (Chinese: 王瑞振; pinyin: Wáng Ruìzhèn; 6 December 1953 – 16 February 2017), known by his pen name Wang Ben-hu (汪笨湖) was a Taiwanese writer and television presenter.

== Life ==
Born in Tainan County, Wang began his writing career in the 1980s, during the Taiwanese literature movement. He worked closely with director Ho Ping, and eventually five of Wang's short stories became films. Ho's first film, The Digger was the work of Wang, as was his second, The Suona Player, for which Ho was awarded a Golden Horse in 1988. Wang's Autumn Tempest, That Vital Organ and The Daughter-in-Law were directed by Huang Yu-shan, Chang Chi-chao, and Steve Wang, respectively.

Wang was noted for his support of the Taiwan independence movement and hosted his best known television program Voice of Taiwan in Taiwanese Hokkien. During the 2004 legislative elections, it was speculated that Wang would run as a Taiwan Solidarity Union candidate, but such a campaign never materialized. That year, Wang repeatedly argued with Democratic Progressive Party legislator Shen Fu-hsiung, who was seen as a likely candidate for the Taipei City mayoralty in 2006, over Shen's criticisms of Chen Shui-bian. Wang began hosting a new program, Taiwan Advancement, in August 2004, which premiered at 8 pm on Chinese Television System, a prime time slot usually reserved for Taiwanese dramas. However, Wang quit due to the severity of disputes between himself and Shen, only to return to the show shortly thereafter. In 2006, opposition to Chen grew, largely led by former DPP chair Shih Ming-teh. Still, Wang remained allied with Chen, attending several rallies to show his support. Upon stepping down from the presidency in 2008, Chen was charged with corruption.

Voice of Taiwan, which had aired on Much TV since 2002, ended in 2005. Wang then became cofounding chairman and host for YAM TV, a Hokkien station. In December 2012, YAM TV laid off over half of its workforce, an action for which it was fined the next month. Wang died at the age of 63 in 2017, due to complications of bone marrow and intestinal cancer, at National Cheng Kung University Hospital in Tainan.
