= Jing-shen Tao =

American history professor (born 1933)

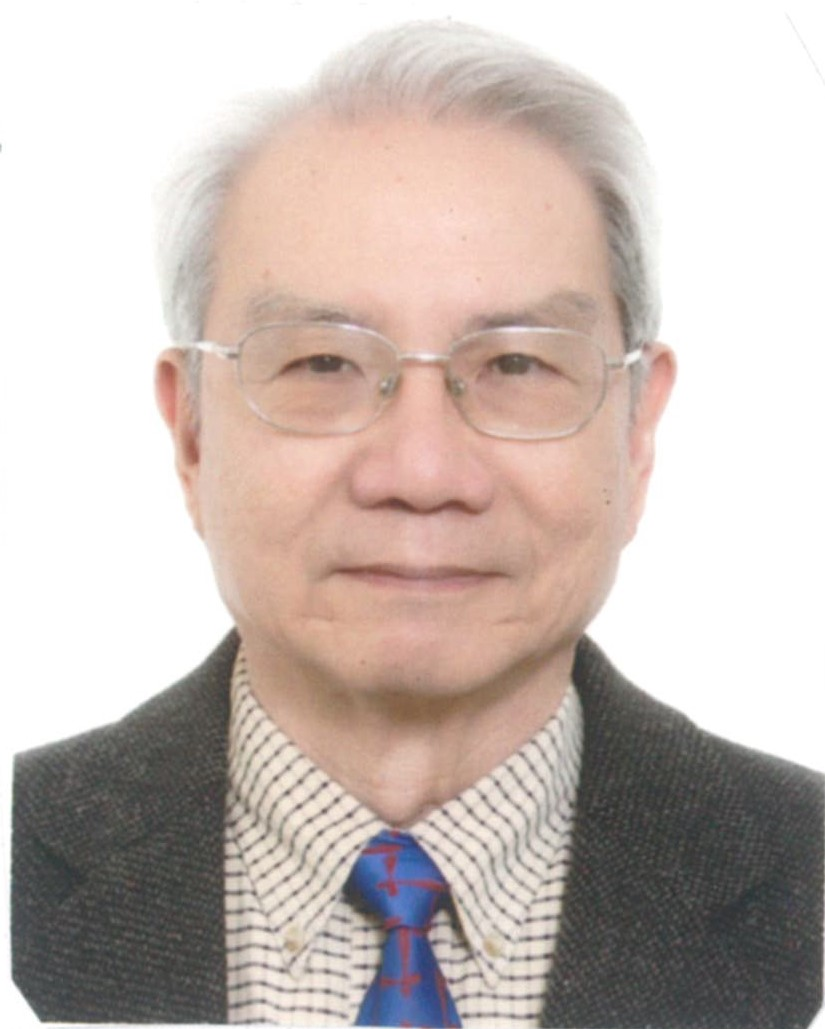
- Born: 1933 (age 92–93); China
- Education: National Taiwan University (BA, MA); Indiana University (PhD)
- Spouse: Chia-lin Pao Tao (鮑家麟)
- Scientific career
- Fields: Chinese history
- Workplaces: Academia Sinica; Soochow University; University of Arizona; Chinese University of Hong Kong
- Thesis: The Jurched in Twelfth-century China: A Study of Sinification (1967)
- Doctoral advisor: Têng Ssu-yü

Chinese name
- Traditional Chinese: 陶晉生
- Simplified Chinese: 陶晋生
Transcriptions
Standard Mandarin
- Hanyu Pinyin: Táo Jìnshēng
Southern Min
- Hokkien POJ: Tô Chìn-seng
- Tâi-lô: Tô Tsìn-sing

Jing-shen Tao (Chinese: 陶晉生; Pe̍h-ōe-jī: Tô Chìn-seng; born 1933) is a Taiwanese-American professor emeritus of Chinese history at University of Arizona and Correspondence Research Fellow at Academia Sinica who specializes in medieval Chinese/Inner Asian history, particularly the Song dynasty, Liao dynasty, and Jin dynasty (1115–1234).

His father T'ao Hsi-sheng was a major scholar-politician during Republic of China (1912–49). Jing-shen Tao was born in mainland China and moved to Taiwan in 1949. Taiwanese author Kuo Cheng is his nephew.

== Education ==
He received a Ph.D. from Indiana University.

== Selected bibliography ==
- The Jurchen in Twelfth-Century China: A Study of Sinicization (Seattle: University of Washington Press, 1976)
- Two Sons of Heaven: Studies of Sung-Liao Relations (Tucson: University of Arizona Press, 1988).
- Excursions in Chinese Culture: Festschrift in Honor of William R. Schultz, co-authored with Marie Chan and Chia-lin Pao Tao (Hong Kong: The Chinese University Press, 2002).
