= Naughty Boys & Soldiers =

- Film poster
- Chinese: 狗蛋。大兵
- Hanyu Pinyin: Gǒudàn Dàbīng
- Directed by: Kevin Chu
- Written by: Kuo Cheng
- Produced by: Lo Tiao-hui
- Starring: Nicky Wu; Steven Hao; Jacky Wu; Yvonne Yung
- Cinematography: Chen Jung-shu
- Edited by: Chen Po-wen
- Music by: Fu Li
- Production company: Yen Ping Films Production
- Release date: 28 December 1996 (Taiwan)
- Country: Taiwan
- Languages: Mandarin; Taiwanese Hokkien; some English

Naughty Boys & Soldiers is a 1996 Taiwanese comedy film directed by Kevin Chu and written by Kuo Cheng, set in a 1970s coastal town with a primary school and a military base. While most of the comedy is slapstick zaniness, the film also pokes fun at the many absurdities in Taiwan's White Terror period, such as schools encouraging children to idolize Chiang Kai-shek and regurgitate his anti-Communist rhetoric.

== Cast ==
- Nicky Wu as Captain Chen
- Yvonne Yung as teacher
- Jacky Wu as Wu Tsung-hsien
- Steven Hao as Liao Kou-tan

== Theme song ==
- "Hudie Fei Ya" (蝴蝶飛呀; "Fly, Butterfly") performed by Xiao Hu Dui
