= Tuo Tsung-hua =

Taiwanese actor

- 庹宗華
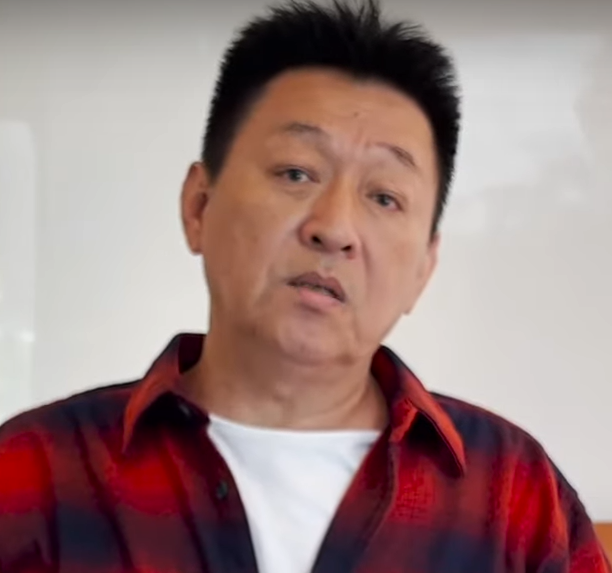
- Tuo in October 2023
- Born: 10 October 1962 (age 64)
- Occupation: Actor

Tuo Tsung-hua (Chinese: 庹宗華; pinyin: Tuǒ Zōnghuá; Pe̍h-ōe-jī: Tô Chong-hôa; born 10 October 1962) is a Taiwanese actor. He won the 2005 Golden Bell Award for Best Actor.

== Flight incident ==
On 1 February 2019, during a China Airlines flight from Taipei to Singapore, Tuo Tsung-hua became intoxicated and began yelling at fellow passengers, shouting obscenities at a man who confronted him, and allegedly molesting a flight attendant. He was arrested upon landing at Singapore's Changi Airport. Although his agent denied any wrongdoing, Tuo later posted a video apologizing for his actions.

== Selected filmography ==
- Osmanthus Alley (1987)
- A Home Too Far (1990)
- Zodiac Killers (1991)
- 18 (1993)
- The Day the Sun Turned Cold (1994)
- Siao Yu (1995)
- The Christ of Nanjing (1995)
- Wolves Cry Under the Moon (1997)
- July Rhapsody (2002)
- The Pawnshop No. 8 (2003)
- Island of Fire (2006)
- Lust, Caution (2007)
- Parking (2008)
- The Warrior and the Wolf (2009)
- Soul (2013)
- Bromance (2015)
- First of May (2015)
- Godspeed (2016)
- Plant Goddess (2018)
- Get the Hell Out (2020)
- 49 Days (2020)
- Copycat Killer (2023)
- Pigsy (2024)
- Weekend in Taipei (2024)
- The Taste of Pork Belly (2025)
