= Lu Hsiao-fen =

Taiwanese actress

- 陸小芬
- Born: 9 October 1956 (age 68); Jiufen, Ruifang District, Taipei County, Taiwan
- Occupation: Actress
- Years active: 1981–present

Lu Hsiao-fen (Chinese: 陸小芬) is a Taiwanese actress known for her roles in the woman's revenge subgenre within Taiwanese social-realist cinema (also called Taiwan Black Movies or Taiwan Pulp). In the later years of her career, she was critically acclaimed as an actress in adaptations of Taiwan nativist novels, most prominently A Flower in the Raining Night (Chinese: 看海的日子, 1983).

== Early life ==
Lu Hsiao-Fen was born in 1956 and her given name was Chang Shu-Fen (Chinese: 張淑芬). She was born and lived in Jiufen until she graduated from elementary school. After graduating from vocational school, she attended singing school and performed as a singer on television and at night clubs. She also participated in a singing contest held by Chinese Television System (Chinese: 華視) and Hai Shan Record (Chinese: 海山唱片) and won first place. In 1980, Lu Hsiao-Fen was cast by Wang Chu-Chin to star in On the Society File of Shanghai (Chinese: 上海社會檔案, 1981), which gave her overnight stardom.

== Career ==
Lu Hsiao-Fen's debut in film was On the Society File of Shanghai (Chinese: 上海社會檔案, 1981), directed by Wang Chu-Chin. The film was an adaptation from the Chinese Scar Literature (Chinese: 傷痕文學). In the film, Lu Hsiao-Fen portrays a rape victim of a high-ranking official and his son. In an interrogation scene, Lu Hsiao-Fen briefly opens her shirt, revealing her breasts for about five frames on the screen. Another shocking scene in the film is when Lu Hsiao-Fen cuts across her chest with a knife. The film became sensational because of these visually stimulating scenes. After the success of On the Society File of Shanghai, Lu Hsiao-Fen became a signed actress of the Yung Sheng Film Company, starring in over 10 films with them.

Lu Hsiao-Fen’s performance in On the Society File of Shanghai also led to the production of similar films, such as Woman Revenger (1981), Queen Bee (1981), and The Lady Avenger (1981). These films became a popular subgenre of Taiwan’s Social-Realist Films and were called Woman’s Revenge Films (Chinese: 女性復仇片) and later Taiwan Black Movies. The most famous female stars of the Woman's Revenge Films were Lu Hsiao-Fen, Lu Yi-Chan (Chinese: 陸一嬋), Lu Yi-Feng (Chinese: 陸儀鳳), and Yang Hui-Shan (Chinese: 楊惠姍), and they were called “Three Lu and One Yang” (三陸一楊).

In 1983, Lu Hsiao-Fen starred in A Flower in the Raining Night (Chinese: 看海的日子, 1983), an adaptation from the short story of Taiwanese Nativist writer Hwang Chun-Ming (Chinese: 黃春明). In the film, Lu Hsiao-Fen portrays a prostitute, Pai-Mei (白玫), who decides to change her destiny and celebrate life by returning to the farming life in the rural area and gives birth to a son. Lu Hsiao-Fen won Best Actress Award of the Golden Horse Award with her performance in A Flower in the Raining Night and transitioned from a sexy film star to a critically acclaimed actress. After the film, Lu Hsiao-Fen starred in many adaptations from Taiwanese Nativist literature, such as Oxcart Filled with Dowry (Chinese: 嫁妝一牛車, 1984), The First Stitch (Chinese: 在室男, 1984), and The Scalper (Chinese: 母牛一條,1986).

In 1988, Lu Hsiao-Fen starred in Osmanthus Alley (Chinese: 桂花巷, 1988), directed by Chen Kun-Hou (Chinese: 陳坤厚). The film is adapted from the novel of the same title by Hsiao Li-Hung (Chinese: 蕭麗紅), an important Taiwanese female writer in the 1970s. In 1989, she starred in Richard Chen Yao-Chi (Chinese: 陳耀圻)’s Spring Swallow (Chinese: 晚春情事, 1989). She won at the Best Actress Award in the Asia-Pacific Film Festival in her performances in both films.

In the 1990s, Lu Hsiao-Fen studied performance in the U.S. and gradually faded out from the silver screen. She still appeared in some Taiwanese-language TV dramas, such as Jin zhi yu ye (金枝玉葉, 2021). In 2003 and 2007, she published two books about practicing Yoga, Lu Hsiao-Fen’s Zen of Life (陸小芬生活禪, 2003) and Zen of Aroma and Happiness (芳香樂活禪, 2007).

In 2023, Lu Hsiao-Fen returned to film acting after 20 years as the lead in Day Off (Chinese: 本日公休, 2023), directed by Fu Tien-Yu (Chinese: 傅天余).

== Personal life ==
In 2005, Lu Hsiao-Fen married Chen Jun-Yuan (Chinese: 陳俊源), a former Taipei City council member. She is a devoted Buddhist and a practitioner of yoga and aromatherapy.

== Filmography ==
=== Film ===
- 1981 On the Society File of Shanghai (Chinese: 上海社會檔案)
- 1981 The Lady Avenger (Chinese: 瘋狂女煞星)
- 1982 The Pink Thief (Chinese: 女賊)
- 1982 The Sexy Lady Driver (Chinese: 糊塗女司機)
- 1982 Exposed to Danger (Chinese: 冷眼殺機)
- 1982 Kill For Love (Chinese: 癡情奇女子)
- 1982 The Anger (Chinese: 失節)
- 1982 Crazy Youth (Chinese: 瘋狂年輕人)
- 1983 Crisis (Chinese: 黑玫瑰)
- 1983 Temptation (Chinese: 誘惑)
- 1983 Women Warriors of Kinmen (Chinese: 金門女兵)
- 1983 A Flower in the Raining Night (Chinese: 看海的日子)
- 1984 Oxcart Filled with Dowry (Chinese: 嫁妝一牛車)
- 1984 The first Stitch (Chinese: 在室男)
- 1985 Wu Nu (Chinese: 舞女)
- 1985 The Pawned Wife (Chinese: 典妻)
- 1985 Love, Lone Flower (Chinese: 孤戀花)
- 1986 Rosa (Chinese: 神勇雙響炮續集)
- 1986 Drifters (Chinese:流浪少年路)
- 1986 The Scalper (Chinese: 母牛一條)
- 1986 Secondhand Goods (Chinese: 二手貨)
- 1986 Lao Hu Lai Liao (Chinese: 老虎來了)
- 1986 Echo of Sea (Chinese: 海潮的故事)
- 1988 Osmanthus Alley (Chinese: 桂花巷)
- 1989 The Digger- For Whom the Suona Blows (Chinese: 陰間響馬吹鼓吹)
- 1989 Spring Swallow (Chinese: 晚春情事)
- 1989 Boss Noballs (Chinese: 沒卵頭家)
- 1990 Song of the Exile (Chinese: 客途秋恨)
- 1990 A Woman and Seven Husbands (Chinese: 販母案考)
- 1993 18 (Chinese: 十八)
- 1999 Top Gear (Chinese: 小卒戰將)
- 2023 Day Off (Chinese: 本日公休)

=== Television Drama ===
- 1999 Fu gui zai tian (Chinese: 富貴在天), Formosa Television
- 2000 Da jiao a ma (Chinese: 大腳阿媽), Formosa Television
- 2001 Jin zhi yu ye (Chinese: 金枝玉葉), Formosa Television

== Awards and nominations ==
=== Golden Horse Awards ===
Year	Award	Category	Nominated work	Result	Ref.
1983	20th Golden Horse Awards	Best Leading Actress	A Flower in the Raining Night	Won	
1993	30th Golden Horse Awards	Best Leading Actress	18	Nominated	
2023	60th Golden Horse Awards	Best Leading Actress	Day Off	Nominated	

=== Asia-Pacific Film Festival ===
Year	Award	Category	Nominated work	Result	Ref.
1987	33th Asia-Pacific Film Festival	Best Actress	Osmanthus Alley	Won	
1988	34th Asia-Pacific Film Festival	Best Actress	Spring Swallow	Won	

=== Osaka Asian Film Festival ===
Year	Award	Category	Nominated work	Result	Ref.
2023	18th Osaka Asian Film Festival	Yakushi Pearl Award for Best Performance	Day Off	Won	

=== Taipei Film Festival ===
Year	Award	Category	Nominated work	Result	Ref.
2023	25th Taipei Film Festival	Best Actress	Day Off	Won	
