= Wu Hsing-kuo =

Taiwanese actor

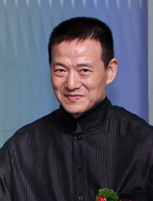
- Born: 12 April 1953 (age 72); Taiwan
- Education: Chinese Culture University
- Awards: Hong Kong Film Awards – Best New Performer; 1994 Temptation of a Monk

Chinese name
- Traditional Chinese: 吳興國
- Simplified Chinese: 吴兴国
Transcriptions
Southern Min
- Hokkien POJ: Ngô͘ Heng-kok

Wu Hsing-kuo (Chinese: 吳興國; Pe̍h-ōe-jī: Ngô͘ Heng-kok) is a Taiwanese film and stage actor, known for both his performance of complex movie roles as much as for his innovative adaptations of Western classics into traditional Peking Opera.

== Life and career ==
Wu was trained in classical Peking Opera since the age of 11 in Taiwan's state-run Fu-Hsing Chinese Opera School, specializing in wu sheng (male martial) roles. He was admitted with honors into the Theatre Department of Chinese Culture University in Taipei, trained under master Chou Cheng-jung (Zhou Zheng-rong) and became the leading dancer of Lin Hwai-min's Cloud Gate Dance Theater. However, his teacher Chou Cheng-jung (Zhou Zheng-rong) considered him as a pretentious student who didn't focus on study and finally abandoned him in 1989. After that, Chou Cheng-jung (died in 2000) never met him again. In addition, most traditional Chinese opera audiences do not recognize him as a qualified actor.

In 1986, he and a group of enthusiastic friends founded the Contemporary Legend Theatre in Taipei, seeking to revitalize traditional Chinese theatre by adapting Western classical plays to the style and techniques of Peking Opera. He was the leading actor and director of four Shakespeare adaptations, including the critically acclaimed Kingdom of Desire (慾望城國), an adaptation of Macbeth, and King Lear (李爾在此), in which Wu plays all the parts.

In 1992, Wu was awarded a Fulbright Scholarship to study in New York with Richard Schechner. That year, he also won the Hong Kong Film Award for best new actor.

Wu is currently artistic director of the Contemporary Legend Theatre, and continues to take on challenging roles in both the modern theatre and Chinese Opera. He crosses the fields of traditional opera, dance, modern theatre, cinema, and television.

== Filmography ==
=== Films ===
Year	English title	Original title	Role	Notes
1993	18		Weirdo	
1993	Temptation of a Monk	誘僧	Shi Yansheng	
1993	Green Snake	青蛇	Xu Xian	
1994	The Great Conqueror's Concubine	西楚霸王	Yu Ziqi	
1994	Rock N'Roll Cop	省港一號通緝犯	Wong Kun	
1994	Right Here Waiting...	等愛的女人	Dickson Koo	
1994	God of Gamblers Return	賭神2	Chao Siu-chi	
1994	What Price Survival	獨臂刀之情	Wang Ning	
1994	Red Rose White Rose	紅玫瑰白玫瑰		
1996	Shanghai Grand	新上海灘	Fung King-yiu	
1997	The Soong Sisters	宋家皇朝	Chiang Kai-shek	
2000	Comeuppance	天有眼		
2001	The Accidental Spy	特務迷城	Lee Sang-zen	
2009	Who Rules Over the Destiny of China	誰主沉浮	Chiang Kai-shek	
2011	Four Hands	麵引子	Sun Hou-cheng	
2012	Love on Gallery Bridge	爱在廊桥	Lin Changtian	
2025	Legends of the Condor Heroes: The Gallants	射雕英雄传：侠之大者	Reverend Yideng	
2025	Creation of the Gods II: Demon Force	封神第二部：战火西岐	Wen Zhong	

=== TV series ===
Year	English title	Original title	Role	Notes
1996	Love, Sword, Mountain & River	情劍山河	Zhao Kuangyin	
1996	The Story of the President	總統的故事	Lee Teng-hui	
1997	China at War	烽火中國		
1999	Holiday	假期	Chu Chen-hsiang	
1999	Dangerous Games	危险游戏	Guan Luochuan	
2000	Tiger's Tenderness	老虎的溫柔	Huang Ho-chun	
2001	Master Swordsman Lu Xiaofeng	陸小鳳之決戰前後	Ye Gucheng	
2003	Flaming Romance	天命因緣	Su Jifei	
2005	Lovelorn High Heels	失戀高跟鞋	Ma Ta-cheng	
2006	To Live to Love	长恨歌	Li Puzhi	

== Awards ==
- Awarded Best New Performer at the Hong Kong Film Awards in (1992).
- Nominated for Best Actor at the 13th Hong Kong Film Awards (1994) for his role in Temptation of a Monk
