= 18 (film) =

- Official poster
- Directed by: Ho Ping
- Written by: Kuo Cheng; Ho Ping
- Based on: "God's Dice" by Kuo Cheng
- Produced by: Li Shu-ping; Lu Mu-tsun
- Starring: Lu Hsiao-fen; Wu Hsing-kuo; Tou Chung-hua
- Cinematography: Ho Ping
- Edited by: Chen Po-wen; Chou Hsu-wei
- Music by: Jim Shum
- Production companies: Creative Communication; Taiwan Film Culture
- Release date: 14 September 1993 (Toronto International Film Festival)
- Running time: 104 minutes
- Country: Taiwan
- Languages: Mandarin; Taiwanese Hokkien

18 is a 1993 Taiwanese experimental film directed by Ho Ping, written by Ho Ping and Kuo Cheng, based on Kuo Cheng's 1991 short story "God's Dice" (上帝的骰子).

The title refers to a popular Taiwanese gambling game played with 4 dice in a rice bowl, with the highest combination (called "18") containing 2 sixes and 2 of any identical number not six (i.e. 1166, 2266, 3366, 4466, and 5566).

== Cast ==
- Wu Hsing-kuo as "Weirdo", probably a second-generation immigrant from mainland China who is a little confused about his identity.
- Lin Chi-lou as Weirdo's wife.
- Lin Chia-chen as Weirdo's young daughter who is too mature for her age.
- Lu Hsiao-fen as Mingzhu, a convenience store owner.
- Lu Hsiao-fen as Ah Kiu, a hotel owner.
- Tou Chung-hua as Ah Hai.
- Chen Hui-lou as Ah Kiu's old husband who came from mainland China around 1949.
- Sze Yu as Wu Sheng, an illegal immigrant from mainland China.

== Awards and nominations ==
Award	Category	Individual	Result
30th Golden Horse Awards	Best Leading Actress	Lu Hsiao-Fen	Nominated
30th Golden Horse Awards	Best Adapted Screenplay	Kuo Cheng, Ho Ping	Nominated
30th Golden Horse Awards	Best Cinematography	Ho Ping	Nominated
30th Golden Horse Awards	Best Makeup & Costume Design	Fu Chang-feng, Roger Cheng	Nominated
30th Golden Horse Awards	Best Sound Effects	Jim Shum	Nominated

The film won International Federation of Film Critics Prize during the 1993 Thessaloniki International Film Festival in Thessaloniki, Greece.
