= Temptation of a Monk =

1993 Hong Kong film by Clara Law

- Film poster
- Directed by: Clara Law
- Written by: Eddie Ling-Ching Fong; Pik Wah Lee
- Produced by: Kay Wong; Teddy Robin; Eddie Ling-Ching Fong; Pik Wah Lee
- Starring: Joan Chen; Wu Hsing-kuo; Fengyi Zhang
- Cinematography: Arthur Wong; Andrew Lesnie
- Edited by: Jill Bilcock
- Music by: Tats Lau; Wai Yee-Leung
- Release date: 8 September 1993
- Running time: 118 minutes
- Country: Hong Kong
- Languages: Mandarin; Cantonese

Temptation of a Monk (Chinese: 誘僧; Cantonese Yale: Yáuh Jāng; pinyin: Yòu Sēng) is a 1993 Hong Kong period drama film directed by Clara Law based on Pik Wah Lee's novel of the same name. The film stars Joan Chen and Wu Hsing-kuo in the lead roles. Its plot follows a monk named Jing-yi and his haunting past, and a lady assassin who was sent to kill him. The film was banned in China.

== Synopsis ==
Set in Tang dynasty China, General Shi Yan-sheng (Hsing-Kuo Wu) was tricked by his friend General Huo Da (Zhang Fengyi) into forsaking his lord Crown Prince Li, whose entire household was murdered in the Xuanwu Gate Incident. Dishonored, Shi swore revenge upon Huo for the treachery but was forced to flee and seek refuge as a Buddhist monk. His mother (Lisa Lu) had committed suicide, and his lover Princess Scarlet (Joan Chen) was later killed in an ambush when one of his surviving comrades betrayed them for bounty. Devastated and heartbroken, Shi wandered around the country and ended up in a ruined mountain monastery attended by only a lonely senile monk, changing his name to Jing-yi.

One day, a widow named Violet, who had striking resemblances with the deceased Scarlet, visited the monastery and decided to become a nun. Initially, Jing-yi was disturbed by Violet's presence but later fell for her seduction, unaware that she was actually an assassin sent by Huo. Violet almost succeeded in killing Jing-yi, but he was saved by the old monk.

Huo decided to come and kill Jing-yi personally, and had the monastery burned down. Jing-yi eventually fought and killed Huo in a duel inside the burning temple. Now earned redemption of his guilt, Jing-yi exiled himself into the wilderness.

== Cast ==
- Joan Chen as Princess Hong-e - Scarlet / Qing-shou - Violet
- Wu Hsing-kuo as General Shi Yan-sheng / Jing-yi
- Fengyi Zhang as General Huo Da
- Ming-yang Li as The Abbot
- Lisa Lu as Shi's Mother

== Reception ==
Temptation of a Monk was met with mixed to positive reviews. While everyone praised the production designs, costumes and cinematography, the writing and characterization was met with lukewarm response. New York Times said that "For all its beauty, the film has its lethargic moments, and the tangled political intrigue that drives the story is not easy to follow." Stephen Teo of Senses of Cinema said that: "Temptation may be in the title but redemption is the real theme of the picture, and it's a measure of Law's inability to expound on the process of redemption that the film finally falls apart." Meanwhile, some of the reviews called this film as a masterpiece and some other found the use of silence as a medium of communication as spellbinding. The first part of the film reminded critics of Akira Kurosawa's Kagemusha. Director Clara Law later stated that those portions represented dawn of the chaos the internal conflict, of the protagonist and those scenes should not be considered as part of sensationalism.

== Awards and nominations ==
=== Won ===
- Mili Award-Cinematographer of the Year for Andrew Lesnie by Australian Cinematographers Society (1995)
- Best New Performer Award by Hong Kong Film Awards (1994) for Hsing-Kuo Wu
- Best Original Score Award by Hong Film Awards (1994) for Tats Lau and Yee-Leung Wai
- Special Award for Ming-yang Li in Golden Horse Film Festival (1993)
- Golden Horse Award for Best Art Direction to Tim Yip, Zhanjia Yang and Wai-Ming Lee in Golden Horse Film Festival (1993)

=== Nominated ===
- Hsing-Kuo Wu for Best Leading Actor in Golden Horse Film Festival (1993)
- Eddie Ling-Ching Fong and Pik Wah Lee for Best Original Screenplay in Golden Horse Film Festival (1993)
- Arthur Wong for Best Cinematography in Golen Horse Film Festival (1993)
- Tim Yip and Wai-Ming Lee for Best Makeup & Costume Design in Golden Film Festival (1993)
- Siu-Hung Leung for Best Action Choreography in Golden Film Festival (1993)
- Best Picture in Hong Kong Film Awards (1994)
- Clara Law for Best Director in Hong Kong Film Awards (1994)
- Hsing-Kuo Wu for Best Actor in Hong Kong Film Awards (1994)
- Ming-yang Li for Best Supporting Actor in Hong Kong Film Awards (1994)
- Andrew Lesnie and Arthur Wong for Best Cinematography in Hong Kong Film Awards (1994)
- Tim Yip, Zhanjia Yang and Wai-Ming Lee for Best Art Direction in Hong Kong Film Awards (1994)
- Wai-Ming Lee for Best Costume & Make Up Design in Hong Kong Film Awards (1994)
- Golden Lion Award in Venice Film Festival (1993)

== Trivia ==
- Joan Chen shaved her head for the role of Violet.
