= Four Hands (film) =

- Traditional Chinese: 麵引子
- Simplified Chinese: 面引子
- Hanyu Pinyin: Miàn Yǐnzi
- Directed by: You-Ning Lee
- Written by: You-Ning Lee; Zhao Dongling
- Produced by: Wang Shou-Qan; Chiu Shun-Ching
- Starring: Wu Hsing-kuo; Yeh Chuan-Chen; Geng Le
- Cinematography: Han Yun-Chung
- Edited by: Ku Hsiao-Yun
- Music by: Vanros Kloud
- Production company: Mei Ah Entertainment Group Ltd.
- Release date: 14 October 2011
- Running time: 112 minutes
- Country: Taiwan
- Language: Mandarin

Four Hands is a Taiwanese drama directed by You-Ning Lee, starring Wu Hsing-kuo. The movie premiered on 12 October 2014 in Taiwan. The story depicts a veteran of the Republic of China Army from Shantung who settled in Taiwan, separated from his family due to the Chinese Civil War. The film deals with the affairs of a three-generation family across the Taiwan Strait. The Chinese title comes from the yeast used when making mantou.

== Plot ==
In 1949, while returning to his home in Shantung, Houcheng (Wu Hsing-kuo) was forcefully conscripted by the Republic of China Army under shackle, leaving behind his younger brother, his wife, and the whole family. Soon after, his wife gives birth to a boy Jiawang (Geng Le).

Fifty years later, Houcheng now lives in a military dependents' village in Taipei, having remarried a local Taiwanese woman and fathering a daughter (Yeh Chuan-Chen) and a grandson. He wakes up every morning to make mantou, per his family tradition since when he was in Mainland China. In his old age and after the death of his second wife, Houcheng returns to visit his hometown in Shandong, only to discover that his first wife had died. He was met with a hostile son who resented him for not having been present in his life. He returns to Taiwan without having resolved the conflict with his son.

Ten years later in Taiwan in 2009, Houcheng suffers a stroke. At the urging of his family, Jiawang goes to Taiwan, perhaps to see his father for the last time. While in his father's home in Taiwan, Jiawang discovers forty years worth of unsent letters (due to the ongoing Civil War) written to his mother, expressing his futile desire to return home. Jiawang realizes that, unlike what he thought, his father had never forgotten about them. With the new discovery, the misunderstanding was resolved. The film ends with Houcheng passing away peacefully in his sick bed, imagining his return to his hometown of 1949, reuniting with his first wife.

== Cast ==
- Wu Hsing-kuo as Sun Houcheng, the protagonist.
- Yeh Chuan-Chen as Jiayi, Houcheng's daughter with his second wife.
- Geng Le as Jiawang Sun, Houcheng's son with his first wife.
- Jenny Zhao as Zuning, Houcheng's first wife, and Suisui, Jiawang's daughter.
- Chang Yan-Ming as Kainan, Chia-yi's son.
