= Wolves Cry Under the Moon =

- Film poster
- Traditional Chinese: 國道封閉
- Simplified Chinese: 国道封闭
- Literal meaning: Highway Closing
- Hanyu Pinyin: Guódào Fēngbì
- Directed by: Ho Ping
- Screenplay by: Kuo Cheng; Ho Ping
- Story by: Kuo Cheng
- Produced by: Lee Yao-ting
- Starring: Annie Yi; Chang Shih; Tou Chung-hua; Ku Pao-ming
- Cinematography: Han Yun-chung
- Edited by: Chen Po-wen
- Music by: Jerry Huang
- Release date: September 9, 1997 (Toronto International Film Festival)
- Running time: 121 minutes
- Country: Taiwan
- Languages: Mandarin; some Taiwanese Hokkien

Wolves Cry Under the Moon is a 1997 Taiwanese road movie directed by Ho Ping, written by Kuo Cheng and Ho Ping. The story is based on 4 short stories by Kuo Cheng.

== Plot ==
The overall story is based on Kuo Cheng's 1993 short story "Highway Closing" (國道封閉, also the film's Chinese title).

=== Sub-plot 1: "The Journey of the Wolf" ===
Based on Kuo Cheng's 1991 short story "The Journey of the Wolf" (狼行千里), which has been translated into English by Susan Wilf.

- Tou Chung-hua
- Ku Pao-ming

=== Sub-plot 2: "Driving on the Road" ===
Based on Kuo Cheng's 1988 short story "Driving on the Road" (開車上路).

- Chang Shih
- Yue Hong

=== Sub-plot 3: "The Heart Thief" ===
Based on Kuo Cheng's 1997 short story "The Heart Thief" (偷心賊).

- Annie Yi
- Jerry Huang (voice)
