= Chang Shih (actor) =

Taiwanese actor

Chang Shih (Chinese: 張世; Pe̍h-ōe-jī: Tiuⁿ Sè; born 7 February 1966) is a Taiwanese actor. He won the Golden Horse Award for Best Supporting Actor in 1989.

== Filmography ==
=== Film ===
Year	English title	Original title	Role	Notes
1981	Happy Days in the Army	動員令		
1983	The Boys from Fengkuei	風櫃來的人	Ah Jung	
1983	Ah Fei	油菜麻籽		
1983	Growing Up	小畢的故事		
1984	The Express	生命快車		
1984	Bicycle and I	單車與我		
1985	Beautiful Men of the Tang Dynasty	唐朝綺麗男		
1985	Taipei Story	青梅竹馬		
1986	Dark Night	暗夜	Manager Chen	
1987	The Game They Call Sex	黃色故事		
1987	Listen to Me	我有話要說		
1987	Ah Zhe's Story	阿哲的故事		
1987	Sir, Tell Me Why?	老師，有問題	Brother Wai	
1987	Cold	那一年我們去看雪		
1988	Chopper and the Six Friends	菜刀與6個朋友	Chopper (young)	
1988	The Adventure of Kung Fu Kids	好小子5：萬能運動員	Li Buzheng	
1989	Gang of Three Forever	童黨萬歲		
1989	First Date	第一次約會	Jialuo	
1989	Banana Paradise	香蕉天堂	Li Desheng	
1989	Let's Go	過河小卒	Qin Zhenguo	
1989	Fight to Survive	我在江湖		
1989	Lessons of the Playground	風雨操場	Zhu Lun	
1989	The Long Vacation	寒假有夠長	Crazy Dog	
1989	Runaway Blues	飆城	Ah Gang's follower	
1990	Playground Again	又見操場	Zheng Xibei	
1990	Dangerous Choices	國中女生	Gio (Xiao Jiu)	
1991	Five Girls and a Rope	五個女子與一根繩子	Sibao	
1991	Love in Venice	情定威尼斯	Ah Li	
1992	China	燒郎紅	Han Dong	
1992	Let Me Speak Up	三人故事		
1992	Hill of No Return	無言的山丘		
1992	Dust of Angels	少年吔，安啦！	killer	
1993	Top Cool	想飛～傲空神鷹		
1994	The Wooden Man's Bride	五魁	Wu Kui	
1994	The Great Conqueror's Concubine	西楚霸王	Qin Er Shi	
1996	Red Persimmon	紅柿子		
1996	Temptress Moon	風月	Li Niangjiu	
1996	Accidental Legend	飛天		
1997	Sexy Story	浮世繪：捉姦·通姦·強姦	Bar owner	Segment 1
1997	Rainy Dog	極道黑社会		
1997	Ghost School	校園有鬼		
1997	Wolves Cry Under the Moon	國道封閉	Lo	
1999	Bad Girl Trilogy	2002壞女孩	Man	Segment: "Queen of the Bench"
2000	A Storm in a Teacup	大惊小怪		
2002	The Rule of the Game	挖洞人	Ju (Chewy)	
2002	Brave 20	鹹豆漿		
2003	Everyone Is Pleased	皆大欢喜		TV film
2004	Manhole	我为谁狂	Liu Yi	
2011	Mirage	幻像		
2012	To My Dear Granny	親愛的奶奶	Ah Da's father	
2014	Live a Love	活路		also director
2015	Where the Wind Settles	風中家族	Sichuanese veteran	

=== TV series ===
- The Emperor in Han Dynasty (2005)
- The Lucky Stars (2005)
- The Myth (2010)
