= Papa, Can You Hear Me Sing =

- DVD cover
- Traditional Chinese: 搭錯車
- Simplified Chinese: 搭错车
- Hanyu Pinyin: Dā Cuò Chē
- Directed by: Yu Kanping
- Written by: Wu Nien-jen; Raymond Wong; Yeh Yun-chiao; Sung Hsiang-ju
- Produced by: Karl Maka; Raymond Wong; Dean Shek
- Cinematography: Hoh Yung-jing
- Edited by: Huang Chiu-kuei
- Music by: Chan Chi-Yuen; Lee Shou-chuan
- Production company: Cinema City Enterprises
- Distributed by: Golden Princess Amusement Company
- Release date: 30 July 1983
- Running time: 89 minutes
- Country: Taiwan
- Languages: Mandarin; Taiwanese Hokkien

Papa, Can You Hear Me Sing (Chinese: 搭錯車) is a 1983 Taiwanese musical film directed by Yu Kanping (虞戡平) starring Sun Yueh and Linda Liu (劉瑞琪). This film was released eight times in Taiwan and eleven times in Hong Kong and won four Golden Horse Awards. The theme song "Any Empty Wine Bottles for Sale" (Chinese: 酒矸倘賣無; Pe̍h-ōe-jī: Chiú-kan thang bōe--bô) performed by Su Rui is also famous.

Da Cuo Che (搭错车; 2005) is a popular 22 episodes TV series produced in mainland China rewriting the film plot starring Li Xuejian (李雪健) and Li Lin (李琳).

== Plot ==
A speech-impaired army veteran works as a bottle collector and lives in a shanty ghetto with a woman who depends on him to bring back a bottle of saki every evening. One morning, on a collection trip, he chances upon an abandoned baby girl in a basket with a note that says "Please give baby Mei a good home." He brings Mei home to raise as his own.

However, his companion is visibly upset with the presence of Mei and the attention he lavishes on her. The next evening, he decides to buy a can of powdered condensed milk for Mei at the expense of the saki. Upon reaching home, his companion bruises his eye. The next evening he brings home a bottle of saki but his companion had left him with baby Mei left with under the care of a neighbor.

The man dotes on her and the neighbors also protect and love her. Mei eventually grows up into a beautiful young woman. She meets a singer-songwriter and they traverse the bar scene as a singing couple. They are talent-spotted by a record producer-manager looking for new talent. However, the record producer only wants Mei, not her boyfriend.

Mei signs a contract with the producer as her manager. Her manager reinvents Mei's image by masking her native and Taiwanese Hokkien linguistic origins, portraying her as the daughter of a rich and respectable family that has since emigrated to the United States, with Mei deciding to stay behind to pursue her singing career. Mei's popularity explodes while her boyfriend languishes along with her father and friends. Her neighbors are upset that she has abandoned her father for fame and fortune. When she returns, her neighbors and dad show up at a publicity party her manager threw for her, where the manager denies her relationship with her father. Mei shuns her father and friends.

One evening, Mei attempts to visit her father without knowing that her ghetto was forcibly demolished by city authorities and where they relocated to. Coincidentally, his father's former companion arrives and ask her about the whereabouts of a friend she has missed for twenty years. However, Mei and her father's former girlfriend are unaware of their connection.

Her father grows depressed and reflects on his years raising Mei. He collapses from depression and hypertension while watching her concert on TV with his neighbours. He is brought to the hospital dying and his widowed neighbour, with whom he has grown intimate, rushes to the concert to get Mei's attention. Mei reaches the hospital too late and breaks down in tears. Afterwards, she decides to sing a song about her father entitled "Any empty bottles for sale?", which her father used to shout in his native Hokkien during his collecting runs.

== Social-political backdrop of the plot ==
The movie was released in 1983 amidst rejuvenated Taiwanese nationalist sentiment and the gradual liberalisation of Taiwanese media from the strangle hold of the mainland-Chinese dominated authoritarian government. During this period, there was renewed tensions between the local-born populace and migrants from mainland China. The inclusion of the local dialect, Taiwanese Hokkien, was considered especially poignant as it had been banned by the government since the 1960s. It also depicts, for the first time in Taiwanese cinema, the controversial process of rapid urbanization through demolition-and-relocation.

== Awards and nominations ==
List of Accolades
Award / Film Festival	Category	Recipient(s)	Result
20th Golden Horse Awards	Best Actor	Sun Yueh	Won
20th Golden Horse Awards	Best Original Film Score	Chen Chih-yuan Lee Shou-chuan	Won
20th Golden Horse Awards	Best Sound Recording	Kao Fu-kuo	Won
20th Golden Horse Awards	Best Original Film Song	Lee Shou-chuan	Won
3rd Hong Kong Film Awards	Best Original Film Score	Chen Chih-yuan Lee Shou-chuan	Won
3rd Hong Kong Film Awards	Best Original Film Song	Song: "Jau Gon Tong Maai Mo" ('Any Empty Wine Bottles to Sell?') Composer/Lyrics: Hau Tak-Kin; Sung by: So Noi	Won
