= Ho Ping =

Taiwanese film director

- 何平
- Born: 1958 (age 67–68); Hsinchu, Taiwan
- Education: Master's degree
- Alma mater: Tunghai University; Syracuse University
- Occupation: Film director

Ho Ping (Chinese: 何平; pinyin: Hé Píng; born 1958) is a Taiwanese film director.

Born in Hsinchu, Taiwan, he studied chemical engineering at Tunghai University before moving to the United States to earn an MFA from Syracuse University. Upon graduation, Ho returned to Taiwan in 1987 and released his directorial debut, The Digger (Yin jian xiang ma) (1988). The next year, he won the Special Jury Prize at the 25th Golden Horse Awards with The Suona Player (Chui gu chui, also known as For whom the Suona Blows). Both The Digger and The Suona Player were film adaptions of short stories written by Wang Ben-hu.

According to director Daw-Ming Lee, his films share a "bitter tone of absurdity" and he is influenced by Jean-Pierre Melville, Krzysztof Kieślowski, Shūji Terayama and Luis Buñuel.

Ho has won a number of awards throughout his career, including the International Federation of Film Critics Award, the Don Quixote Prize of the International Federation of Film Societies, and the Special Jury Prize at the Golden Horse Awards twice. He has also directed television shows and commercials, largely between 2002 and 2007. Between filming Sweet Revenge (2007) and Battle Up (2015), Ho taught full-time at National Taiwan University of Arts.

== Filmography ==
- The Digger (陰間響馬, Yin jian xiang ma) (1988) – segment of The Digger, The Suona Player (陰間響馬, 吹鼓吹), co-directed with Daw-Ming Lee
- Honor Thy Father (Gan'en de Suiyue) (1989) – a biopic of Sadaharu Oh's childhood, commissioned by the Central Motion Picture Corporation
- 18 (十八, Shi ba) (1993)
- Wolves Cry Under the Moon (Guo dao feng bi) (1997)
- Motel Erotica (Zhuo jian) (1998)
- The Rule of the Game (挖洞人, Wa dong ren) (2002)
- Princess in Wonder (Gong zhu che ye wei mian) (2003) – based on a novel by Chen Ying-Shuh, a comedy about a woman suffering from amnesia following an accident
- Sweet Revenge (Gei sun yan) (2007) – a commercial failure in both China and Hong Kong
- Battle Up (2015)
